= List of Tougeki winners =

The following is a list of players who have won the Tougeki fighting game tournament.

== 2003 ==
The King of Fighters 2002
Place	Player	Alias	Character(s)
1st	Yōhei Miyahara	Ōgosho (大御所)	Clark / Shermie / Billy Kane
2nd	Sung-Jin Kim (from Korea)	Bash (バッシュ)	Billy Kane / Vanessa / Benimaru
3rd	Yūki Ishigaki	Kyabetsu (キャベツ)	?
3rd	Ryōta Fukumoto	RF	?

Soulcalibur II
Place	Player	Entry name	Character(s)
1st	?	Dekachō (刑事長)	Mitsurugi
2nd	?	Althena Knight (アルテナナイト)	Nightmare
3rd	?	FetZ (from USA)	Cervantes
3rd	?	Sarusube (さるすべ)	Astaroth

Capcom vs. SNK 2
Place	Player	Entry name	Character(s)
1st	Hajime Taniguchi	Tokido (ときど)	A Groove - Sakura / M. Bison / Blanka
2nd	Daigo Umehara	Umehara (ウメハラ)	C Groove - Chun-Li / Guile / Sagat
3rd	Tetsuya Inoue	Inoue (井上)	K Groove - Sagat / Blanka / Cammy
3rd	?	Morikawa (モリカワ)	A Groove - Blanka / Hibiki / Bison

Super Street Fighter II Turbo 3 vs. 3 Teams
Place	Team name	Players	Entry name	Characters
1st	Otochun Gundan (オトチュン軍団)	Daigo Umehara	Umehara (ウメハラ)	Ryu
1st	Otochun Gundan (オトチュン軍団)	?	Otochun (オトチュン)	Chun-Li
1st	Otochun Gundan (オトチュン軍団)	?	Kurahashi (クラハシ)	Guile
2nd	Shinsengumi (新鮮組)	?	KKY	Dhalsim
2nd	Shinsengumi (新鮮組)	?	Akishima (秋縞)	Chun-Li
2nd	Shinsengumi (新鮮組)	?	Yoshimi (よしみ)	Ken
3rd	Dera Beppin (寺☆ベッピン)		Sawada (さわだ)	Cammy
3rd	Dera Beppin (寺☆ベッピン)	?	Kamille Binta (カミーユ ビンタ)	Ryu
3rd	Dera Beppin (寺☆ベッピン)	?	BAT	Dhalsim
3rd	Jiroken Shineitai (じろけん親衛隊)	?	Mute Guile (むてガイル)	Guile
3rd	Jiroken Shineitai (じろけん親衛隊)	?	Tontanki (東単騎)	T. Hawk
3rd	Jiroken Shineitai (じろけん親衛隊)	?	Nīa (にーあ)	E. Honda

Street Fighter III: 3rd Strike 3 vs. 3 Teams
Place	Team name	Players	Entry name	Characters
1st	Hikone Fight Club (ひこねファイトクラブ)	?	Kiyomatsu (清松)	Ken
1st	Hikone Fight Club (ひこねファイトクラブ)	?	Ueno (上野)	Yun
1st	Hikone Fight Club (ひこねファイトクラブ)	?	Izu (いづ)	Makoto
2nd	Beat Tribe (ビートライブ)	?	Spermaster J (スペルマスターJ)	Ken
2nd	Beat Tribe (ビートライブ)	?	Onanism (オナニズム)	Urien
2nd	Beat Tribe (ビートライブ)	?	Meta (メタ)	Chun-Li
3rd	Wakamatsu-gumi Unchinel Kumichō House (若松組ウンチネル組長ハウス)	?	Boss (ボス)	Yang
3rd	Wakamatsu-gumi Unchinel Kumichō House (若松組ウンチネル組長ハウス)	?	Danna (ダンナ)	Dudley
3rd	Wakamatsu-gumi Unchinel Kumichō House (若松組ウンチネル組長ハウス)	Kenji Obata	KO	Yun
3rd	ABC	?	Umekado (梅門)	Elena
3rd	ABC	?	Naga (なが)	Ken
3rd	ABC	?	Machiko (マチコ)	Urien

Guilty Gear XX 3 vs. 3 Teams
Place	Team name	Players	Entry name	Characters
1st	Babelfish-tan Haahaa (バベルフィッシュたんハァハァ)	?	kaqn	Millia
1st	Babelfish-tan Haahaa (バベルフィッシュたんハァハァ)	?	Hokushin (北辰)	Eddie
1st	Babelfish-tan Haahaa (バベルフィッシュたんハァハァ)	?	Yukinose (ゆきのせ)	Bridget
2nd	WA SHI MI	?	Himaru (火九)	Axl Low
2nd	WA SHI MI	?	Washimi (鷲見)	Sol
2nd	WA SHI MI	?	Mochida (持田)	Millia
3rd	Ore to Omae to Daigorou (俺とお前と大吾郎)	?	Shinya Arisaka (ありさかしんや)	Slayer
3rd	Ore to Omae to Daigorou (俺とお前と大吾郎)	Daigo Umehara	Umehara (ウメハラ)	Sol
3rd	Ore to Omae to Daigorou (俺とお前と大吾郎)	Kazutoshi Sekine	Pachi (パチ)	Faust
3rd	Chīchan ni Omakase (ちぃちゃんにおまかせ)	?	T.S	Dizzy
3rd	Chīchan ni Omakase (ちぃちゃんにおまかせ)	?	Gorotan (ごろたん)	Johnny
3rd	Chīchan ni Omakase (ちぃちゃんにおまかせ)	?	Niku Q (肉Q)	Eddie

Virtua Fighter 4: Evolution 3 vs. 3 Teams
Place	Team name	Players	Entry name	Characters
1st	Moralist (モラリスト)	?	Tsuchikumo (つちくも)	Pai
1st	Moralist (モラリスト)	?	The Guerilla (ザ・ゲリラ)	Aoi
1st	Moralist (モラリスト)	?	Game Center Arashi (ゲームセンター嵐)	Goh
2nd	Bucchake Fight Club (ぶっちゃけファイトクラブ)	?	Heruru (へるる)	Lei-Fei
2nd	Bucchake Fight Club (ぶっちゃけファイトクラブ)	?	Potemkin (ポチョムキン)	Pai
2nd	Bucchake Fight Club (ぶっちゃけファイトクラブ)	?	Rocky-ryū Oka Mask (ロッキー流・オカマスク)	Aoi
3rd	I love Misaki (I love みさき)	?	H.S.U	?
3rd	I love Misaki (I love みさき)	?	Dabi (ダビ)	?
3rd	I love Misaki (I love みさき)	?	Edo (エド)	?
3rd	Bōmei Kazoku (亡命華族)	?	Armadillo Otouto (アルマジロ弟)	?
3rd	Bōmei Kazoku (亡命華族)	?	Bonbibon (ボンビボン)	?
3rd	Bōmei Kazoku (亡命華族)	?	Taru (樽)	?

== 2004 ==
The King of Fighters 2003
Place	Player	Entry name	Character(s)
1st	?	Wars (ウォーズ)	Duo Lon/Goro Daimon/K'
2nd	?	Makirinrin no deshideshi (マキ麟リンの弟子デシ)	Gato/Duo Lon/Ralf Jones
3rd	?	Kyappu (キャップ)	
3rd	?	Shoki (書記)	Duo Lon/Iori Yagami#Iori/Goro Daimon

Vampire Savior (Darkstalkers 3)
Place	Player	Entry name	Character(s)
1st	Tatsuya Haitani	Haitani (ハイタニ)	Sasquatch
2nd	?	T2ya	Lord Raptor
3rd	Naoto Sako	Sako	Baby Bonnie Hood
3rd	?	Teruchika (てるちか)	Felicia

Virtua Fighter 4: Evolution 3 vs. 3 Teams
Place	Team name	Players	Entry name	Characters
1st	Daibutsu Punk (大仏パンク)	?	Chemuru (チェムル)	Wolf
1st	Daibutsu Punk (大仏パンク)	?	Inocchi (いのっち)	Akira
1st	Daibutsu Punk (大仏パンク)	?	Jin (ジン)	Kage
2nd	Imaji Sōsakutai (いまじ捜索隊)	?	Yōrōkage (養老影)	Kage
2nd	Imaji Sōsakutai (いまじ捜索隊)	?	Chō Minami Akira (超南アキラ)	Akira
2nd	Imaji Sōsakutai (いまじ捜索隊)	?	Hakushon Lau Maō (ハクションラウ魔王)	Lau
3rd	Munekyun BOY'S (胸キュンBOY's)	?	Fudō (不動)	Kage
3rd	Munekyun BOY'S (胸キュンBOY's)	?	Nesu (ネス)	Lei-Fei
3rd	Munekyun BOY'S (胸キュンBOY's)	?	Suguru (すぐる)	Lion
3rd	Yajū Shūgekidō (野獣蹴撃道)	?	Senpūjin (旋風人)	Lau
3rd	Yajū Shūgekidō (野獣蹴撃道)	?	Mukky Akira (ムッキー晶)	Akira
3rd	Yajū Shūgekidō (野獣蹴撃道)	?	Itoshun (イトシュン)	Brad

Capcom vs. SNK 2 3 vs. 3 Teams
Place	Team name	Players	Entry name	Characters
1st	Chūsotsu DQN Trio (中卒DQNトリオ)	Yōsuke Itō	Kindevu (金デヴ)	A Groove - Sakura / M. Bison(Vega JP) / Blanka
1st	Chūsotsu DQN Trio (中卒DQNトリオ)	?	Sawada (サワダ)	A Groove - Sakura / M. Bison(Vega JP) / Blanka
1st	Chūsotsu DQN Trio (中卒DQNトリオ)	Kenryō Hayashi; Hyeonhyeong Im	Mago (マゴ)	C Groove - Edmond Honda / Sagat / Blanka
2nd	Himitsukessha Haijin (秘密結社廃人)	?	Kichinī (きちにぃ～)	A Groove - Rock / Geese / Rolento
2nd	Himitsukessha Haijin (秘密結社廃人)	?	Ryō (リョウ)	A Groove -Blanka / Hibiki / M. Bison(Vega JP)
2nd	Himitsukessha Haijin (秘密結社廃人)	?	Shō (ショウ)	A Groove - Sakura / M. Bison(Vega JP) / Blanka
3rd	FINAL	Tetsuya Inoue	Inoue (井上)	K Groove - Sagat / Cammy / Blanka
3rd	FINAL	Shinya Ōnuki	Nuki (ヌキ)	N Groove - Akuma / Chun-Li / Sagat
3rd	FINAL	Hajime Taniguchi	Tokido (ときど)	N Groove - Vega / Sagat / Blanka
3rd	Sekaihastu! Nihonhatsu! (世界初！日本発！)	?	JOE	A Groove - Kyo / M. Bison(Vega JP) / Blanka
3rd	Sekaihastu! Nihonhatsu! (世界初！日本発！)	?	Togawa (トガワ)	N Groove - Iori / Ken / Sagat
3rd	Sekaihastu! Nihonhatsu! (世界初！日本発！)	?	Nitto (にっと)	K Groove - Sagat / Geese / Cammy

Street Fighter III: 3rd Strike 3 vs. 3 Teams
Place	Team name	Players	Entry name	Characters
1st	Zenchi Zennō (全知全能)	?	Raō (ラオウ)	Chun-Li
1st	Zenchi Zennō (全知全能)	?	Mesta (メスタ)	Yun
1st	Zenchi Zennō (全知全能)	?	Spermaster J (スペルマスターJ)	Ken
2nd	Shine shine dan. Naoki gumi (死ね死ね団。ナミキ組)	?	Shao (シャオ)	Ibuki
2nd	Shine shine dan. Naoki gumi (死ね死ね団。ナミキ組)	?	J	Makoto
2nd	Shine shine dan. Naoki gumi (死ね死ね団。ナミキ組)	?	イッセー (Issē)	Yun
3rd	Final Bomb (ファイナルボム)	Shinya Ōnuki	Nuki (ヌキ)	Chun-Li
3rd	Final Bomb (ファイナルボム)	?	Boss (ボス)	Yang
3rd	Final Bomb (ファイナルボム)	Kenji Obata	K.O	Yun
3rd	----. (----。)	?	Umezono / Hikone Fight Club (梅園/ひこねファイトクラブ)	Chun-Li
3rd	----. (----。)	?	Matsuda (松田)	Yun
3rd	----. (----。)	?	Washimi (鷲見)	Ken

Tekken 4
Place	Player	Entry name	Character(s)
1st	?	Takeyama (たけやま)	Jin Kazama
2nd	?	Tarechichiganryu （垂れ乳巌竜）	Xiaoyu
3rd	?	Kumari (クマリ)	Nina
3rd	?	sdz	Bryan

Samurai Shodown V
Place	Player	Entry name	Character(s)
1st	?	Uchiyama (ウチヤマ)	Suija
2nd	?	Doremifadeguchi (どれみふぁでぐち)	Charlotte
3rd	?	ATC	Rena
3rd	?	JEO	Kusaregedo

Guilty Gear XX #Reload 3 vs. 3 Teams
Place	Team name	Players	Entry name	Characters
1st	Trouble Maker Sharon ! (トラブルメーカーシャロン！)	?	Yukinose (ゆきのせ)	Bridget
1st	Trouble Maker Sharon ! (トラブルメーカーシャロン！)	?	Matsu (マツ)	Millia
1st	Trouble Maker Sharon ! (トラブルメーカーシャロン！)	?	Sharon (赭龍)	Baiken
2nd	Nemo no Ongaeshi (ネモの恩返し)	?	Kaqn	Jam
2nd	Nemo no Ongaeshi (ネモの恩返し)	Naoki Nemoto	Nemo (ネモ)	Faust
2nd	Nemo no Ongaeshi (ネモの恩返し)	?	Imo (イモ)	Zappa
3rd	Ichiman Kyūsen Happyakuen (壱満蜂戦急珀園)	?	Saku (サク)	Slayer
3rd	Ichiman Kyūsen Happyakuen (壱満蜂戦急珀園)	?	Attsun (あっつん)	I-No
3rd	Ichiman Kyūsen Happyakuen (壱満蜂戦急珀園)	?	MINT	Testament
3rd	ofc	Kazutoshi Sekine	Pachi (パチ)	Faust
3rd	ofc	?	H.H	Dizzy
3rd	ofc	?	Geneinin (幻影人)	Robo-Ky

== 2005 ==
The King of Fighters Neowave
Place	Player	Entry name	Character(s)
1st	Yūki Ishigaki	Kyabetsu (キャベツ)	Terry Bogard / Takuma / Saisyu
2nd	Hee-sam Woo	Wū (ウー)	Saisyu / Takuma / Robert
3rd	?	Kazuya (カズヤ)	King / Choi / Geese
3rd	?	Machuri (まちゅり)	Choi / Billy / Geese

Tekken 5
Place	Player	Entry name	Character(s)
1st	Park Hyun-kyu (Korea)	Nin	Steve Fox
2nd	?	Deboru (でぼる)	Bryan
3rd	Shimon Kawai	Tissue mon yokotobi (ティッシュもん横飛び)	Raven
3rd	?	Shamoken (しゃもケン)	Nina

Street Fighter III: 3rd Strike 2 vs. 2 Teams
Place	Team name	Players	Entry name	Characters
1st	UmeNuki (ウメヌキ)	Shinya Ōnuki	Nuki (ヌキ)	Chun-Li
1st	UmeNuki (ウメヌキ)	Daigo Umehara	Umehara (ウメハラ)	Ken
2nd	Sugusore (すぐそれ)	Kenji Obata	KO	Yun
2nd	Sugusore (すぐそれ)	Katsuhisa Ōta	Kokujin (こくじん)	Dudley
3rd	Futari ha Furikyura Max Heart (ふたりはフリキャラ Max Heart)	?	Kuroda (クロダ)	Q
3rd	Futari ha Furikyura Max Heart (ふたりはフリキャラ Max Heart)	?	Hayao (はやお)	Hugo
3rd	Goemon Ikka (ゴエモン一家)	?	Goemon@Yanushi (ゴエモン@家主)	Yan
3rd	Goemon Ikka (ゴエモン一家)	?	Deshiken@GOE (弟子犬@GOE)	Ken

Guilty Gear XX #Reload 3 vs. 3 Teams
Place	Team name	Players	Entry name	Characters
1st	Mayori Captor Ogawa (マヨリキャプター小川))	Toshikazu Sekine	Pachi (パチ)	Faust
1st	Mayori Captor Ogawa (マヨリキャプター小川))	Kenichi Ogawa	Ogawa (小川)	Eddie
1st	Mayori Captor Ogawa (マヨリキャプター小川))	?	kaqn	Jam
2nd	Y.K. Gyūdon Chain store "Shinya" (（有）牛丼チェーン店「信屋」)	?	Shinya Arisaka (ありさか しんや)	Robo-Ky
2nd	Y.K. Gyūdon Chain store "Shinya" (（有）牛丼チェーン店「信屋」)	?	Imo (イモ)	Zappa
2nd	Y.K. Gyūdon Chain store "Shinya" (（有）牛丼チェーン店「信屋」)	Naoki Nemoto	Nemo (ネモ)	Faust
3rd	Gamen wo mitara make dato omotteiru (がめんを見たら負けだと思っている)	Yōsuke Itō	Kindevu (金デヴ)	Eddie
3rd	Gamen wo mitara make dato omotteiru (がめんを見たら負けだと思っている)	Ryota Fukumoto	R.F	Faust
3rd	Gamen wo mitara make dato omotteiru (がめんを見たら負けだと思っている)	Tsutomu Kubota	kubo	Slayer
3rd	MELTY BLOOD#R	?	Shinso no himegimi Lena (真祖の姫君レナ)	Millia
3rd	MELTY BLOOD#R	?	Kurenaisekishu Kurusu (紅赤朱くるす)	Bridget
3rd	MELTY BLOOD#R	?	Maid san BIG (メイドさんBIG)	Dizzy

Capcom Fighting Jam 2 vs. 2 Teams
Place	Team name	Players	Entry name	Characters
1st	Hasha (覇者)	Hajime Taniguchi	Tokido (ときど)	Jedah / Urien
1st	Hasha (覇者)	Kenryō Hayashi; Hyeonhyeong Im	Mago (マゴ)	Karin / Anakaris
2nd	Mitei (未定)	Daigo Umehara	Umehara (ウメハラ)	Urien / Guile
2nd	Mitei (未定)	?	Dan (ダン)	Ryu / Karin
3rd	Gokigenyo Onesama (ごきげんよう お姉さま)	?	Y.F	Demitri / Karin
3rd	Gokigenyo Onesama (ごきげんよう お姉さま)	?	Ayanami Lilith (綾波リリス)	Anakaris / Jedah
3rd	Chiken Groove (チキングルーヴ)	?	agOFC	Kenji / Leo
3rd	Chiken Groove (チキングルーヴ)	?	HIRO！FC	Karin / Hauzer

== 2006 ==
The King of Fighters XI
Place	Player	Entry name	Character(s)
1st	?	Kaoru (カオル)	Eiji / Kula / Gato
2nd	Yuanzhang Xu (from Taiwan)	Kyo Genshō (許元章)	King / Ryo / Kula
3rd	Kenryō Hayashi; Hyeonhyeong Im	Mago (マゴ)	Oswald / Kula / Gato
3rd	?	Riki (りき)	Clark / Ralf / Gato

NeoGeo Battle Coliseum
Place	Player	Entry name	Character(s)
1st	?	KEE-ROC@SMK	Hotaru / Kim Kaphwan
2nd	?	F2-PON@SMK	Hotaru / Kim Kaphwan
3rd	?	R-HOWARD@SMK	Robert / Kim Kaphwan
3rd	?	Jasmine (ジャスミン)	Mizuchi / Kim Kaphwan

Fist of the North Star
Place	Player	Entry name	Character(s)
1st	?	Kurenai no Buta (紅の豚)	Toki
2nd	?	Tajikun (タジ君)	Juda
3rd	?	Kīsu (キース)	Heart
3rd	?	Hexamethylene (ヘキサメチレン)	Toki

Samurai Shodown VI 2 vs. 2 Teams
Place	Team name	Players	Entry name	Characters
1st	Meikyōshisui -Shoshinsha Kōryaku Site- (明鏡止水～初心者攻略サイト～)	?	Mishima (ミシマ)	Iroha
1st	Meikyōshisui -Shoshinsha Kōryaku Site- (明鏡止水～初心者攻略サイト～)	?	Doro (ドロ)	Gen-An
2nd	Takasago (高砂)	?	Fusemasuta (ふせますた)	Mina
2nd	Takasago (高砂)	?	Yū (ユウ)	Yunfei
3rd	Kurofune (黒船)	?	Reoth	Iroha
3rd	Kurofune (黒船)	Hajime Taniguchi	Tokido (ときど)	Mina
3rd	Kabekondato omouyone (壁コンだと思うよね)	?	Tororo (とろろ)	Rasetsumaru
3rd	Kabekondato omouyone (壁コンだと思うよね)	?	Shinomaru (しのまる)	Shizumaru

Melty Blood: Act Cadenza 2 vs. 2 Teams
Place	Team name	Players	Entry name	Characters
1st	TALES OF THE ILS	?	ILS	Red Arcueid
1st	TALES OF THE ILS	?	Niga (にが)	Sion
2nd	Hanabira Mankai Candies Ganbaru (花びら満開キャンディーズ頑張る)	?	Satoken (さとけん)	Akiha Vermillion
2nd	Hanabira Mankai Candies Ganbaru (花びら満開キャンディーズ頑張る)	Tsutomu Kubota	kubo	Sion
3rd	Mahōshōjo Lilical Frandore (魔法少女リリカルフランドール)	?	K Neko (K猫)	Red Arcueid
3rd	Mahōshōjo Lilical Frandore (魔法少女リリカルフランドール)	?	Furan Ningyo (腐乱人形)	Satsuki
3rd	[Kai + 1] ([カイ+1])	?	Kai (カイ)	Akiha Vermillion
3rd	[Kai + 1] ([カイ+1])	?	Shōnen (少年)	Wallachia

Tekken 5: Dark Resurrection 3 vs. 3 Teams
Place	Team name	Players	Entry name	Characters
1st	NO-Respect	?	Yū (ユウ)	Feng Wei
1st	NO-Respect	?	Shō (ショウ)	Devil Jin
1st	NO-Respect	?	Jirō (ジロー)	Steve Fox
2nd	Saitama POPY Daihyō (埼玉POPY代表)	?	Hamahā (ハマハー)	Lee Chaolan
2nd	Saitama POPY Daihyō (埼玉POPY代表)	?	Daipan (ダイパン)	King
2nd	Saitama POPY Daihyō (埼玉POPY代表)	?	Gekitetsu (激鉄)	Ganryu
3rd	Aoten no KEN (あお天のKEN)	?	KEN	Julia Chang
3rd	Aoten no KEN (あお天のKEN)	?	Sōten (蒼天)	Yoshimitsu
3rd	Aoten no KEN (あお天のKEN)	?	Aochī (青チー)	Hwoarang
3rd	Gyōza Nininmae (ギョーザ2人前)	?	Mentos Ryū (メンストリュウ)	Heihachi
3rd	Gyōza Nininmae (ギョーザ2人前)	?	Matador (マタドール)	Ganryu
3rd	Gyōza Nininmae (ギョーザ2人前)	?	Taizō (たいぞー)	Feng Wei

Guilty Gear XX Slash 3 vs. 3 Teams
Place	Team name	Players	Entry name	Characters
1st	[Yukinose Desu] (『ゆきのせです』)	?	Yukinose (ゆきのせ)	Testament
1st	[Yukinose Desu] (『ゆきのせです』)	?	KA2	Jam
1st	[Yukinose Desu] (『ゆきのせです』)	?	GNT	Millia
2nd	Tero dā!! (テロだー！！)	?	BLEED	Johnny
2nd	Tero dā!! (テロだー！！)	?	Domī (ドミー)	Anji Mito
2nd	Tero dā!! (テロだー！！)	?	Shūto (シュウト)	Axl Low
3rd	Doumitemo Chūnendesu. (どう見ても中年です。)	?	Shonen (少年)	Testament
3rd	Doumitemo Chūnendesu. (どう見ても中年です。)	?	Ruu (ルゥ)	Bridget
3rd	Doumitemo Chūnendesu. (どう見ても中年です。)	?	Aiki (愛樹)	Ky Kiske
3rd	[Mezurashiku Hayakukita] (【珍しく早くきた】)	?	Roi (ロイ)	Sol Badguy
3rd	[Mezurashiku Hayakukita] (【珍しく早くきた】)	?	Tau (タウ)	Ky Kiske
3rd	[Mezurashiku Hayakukita] (【珍しく早くきた】)	?	Isamu (勇)	Venom

Virtua Fighter 4: Final Tuned 3 vs. 3 Teams
Place	Team name	Players	Entry name	Characters
1st	Yariotta (やりおった）	?	K-2	Sarah
1st	Yariotta (やりおった）	?	Nadaru Gō (灘琉豪)	Akira
1st	Yariotta (やりおった）	?	Game Center Arashi (ゲームセンター嵐)	Jacky
2nd	Virtua☆Fusion	Eiji Komatsu	Chibita (ちび太)	Lion
2nd	Virtua☆Fusion	Masafumi Yoshioka	Ōsu Akira (大須 晶)	Akira
2nd	Virtua☆Fusion	Shinya Ōnuki	Nuki (ヌキ)	Aoi
3rd	Banana Man (バナナマン)	?	Izō (以蔵)	Lau
3rd	Banana Man (バナナマン)	?	Kyasubaru (きゃすばる)	Vanessa
3rd	Banana Man (バナナマン)	?	Pochi (ポチ)	Vanessa
3rd	The Minna Nakayoku (The みんなナカヨク)	?	Butsuzō (仏像)	Kage-Maru
3rd	The Minna Nakayoku (The みんなナカヨク)	?	Kuroneko (黒猫)	Lion
3rd	The Minna Nakayoku (The みんなナカヨク)	?	Akuma Pai (悪魔パイ)	Pai

Street Fighter III: 3rd Strike 3 vs. 3 Teams
Place	Team name	Players	Entry name	Characters
1st	Masters (マスターズ)	?	MOV	Chun-Li
1st	Masters (マスターズ)	?	Sparmaster J (スペルマスターJ)	Ken
1st	Masters (マスターズ)	?	DD Nitto (DDにっと)	Yun
2nd	Champion Road - Michi - (チャンピオンロード ～道～)	?	Shōwa (昭和)	Makoto
2nd	Champion Road - Michi - (チャンピオンロード ～道～)	?	Ishimatsu (石松)	Yun
2nd	Champion Road - Michi - (チャンピオンロード ～道～)	?	Hanagasa (花笠)	Akuma
3rd	Vigion	Shinya Ōnuki	Nuki (ヌキ)	Chun-Li
3rd	Vigion	Kenji Obata	K.O	Yun
3rd	Vigion	Katsuhisa Ōta	Kokujin (こくじん)	Dudley
3rd	Monkey House (モンキーハウス)	?	Deshiken KFG (弟子犬KFG)	Ken
3rd	Monkey House (モンキーハウス)	?	Ushi !? (牛！？)	Urien
3rd	Monkey House (モンキーハウス)	?	Goemon (ゴエモン)	Yang

== 2007 ==
Game	Team Name	Player(s)	Character(s)
Arcana Heart	-	Ao@Bokujou (青@牧場)	Lieselotte/Bhanri
Soulcalibur III: Arcade Edition	-	Sarusube	Astaroth
The King of Fighters '98	-	Xiaohai (China)	Iori Yagami/Orochi Chris/Daimon
Melty Blood: Act Cadenza Version B	Nobless Oblige (ノブレス オブ リージュ)	Yuu (ゆう) Denpa (電波)	Tohno Akiha Yumizuka Satsuki
Hyper Street Fighter II	クラヌキ	Nuki (ヌキ) Kurahashi (クラハシ)	ST Chun-Li CE Guile
Tekken 5: Dark Resurrection	Team Chanja for 2	MSRyu2 Taizo Matador	Heihachi Mishima Feng Wei Ganryu
Street Fighter III: 3rd Strike	Eternal Force Blizzard (エターナルフォースブリザード)	Umezono (梅園) Matsuda (松田) Shiro Itachi (シロイタチ)	Chun-Li Yun Makoto
Guilty Gear XX Λ Core	Oniganii (おにがにー)	Ogawa (小川) Niga (にが) Niku-Q	Eddie Slayer Testament
Virtua Fighter 5 Version B	Clarken	Chibita Yanaga Akape	Lion Pai Chan Goh Hinogami

== 2008 ==
Arcana Heart 2
Place	Player	Entry name	Character(s)
1st	?	Henboku (へんぼく)	Lilica / Partinias
2nd	?	TOMO	Catherine
3rd	?	Kuitan (くいたん)	Clarice
3rd	?	Nezukichi (ねずきち)	Angelia

Fist of the North Star
Place	Player	Entry name	Character(s)
1st	?	K.I	Rei
2nd	?	Kurenai no Buta (紅の豚)	Toki
3rd	?	KOK	Toki
3rd	?	Shirō (志郎)	Raoh

The King of Fighters '98 Ultimate Match
Place	Player	Entry name	Character(s)
1st	?	Makkī (マッキー)	Existra - Geese Howard / Iori Yagami / Krauser
2nd	? (from Taiwan)	Baozi (包子)	Existra - Yuri / Heavy D! / Krauser
3rd	?	Kēgo 3 (ケーゴ3)	Advance - Yashiro / Geese Howard / Krauser
3rd	?	Chawan (ちゃわん)	Existra - Brian Battler / Eiji Kisaragi / Krauser

Melty Blood: Act Cadenza Version B2 2 vs. 2 Teams
Place	Team name	Players	Entry name	Characters
1st	Butauma (豚馬)	?	Kō (コウ)	Akiha Vermillion
1st	Butauma (豚馬)	Tsutomu Kubota	kubo	Sion Eltnam Atlasia
2nd	Mel-Blo shinikitade (メルブラしにきたで)	?	Deguchi (でぐち)	Ciel
2nd	Mel-Blo shinikitade (メルブラしにきたで)	?	Mil Mil Milky (みるみるミルキー)	Miyako
3rd	Tachibana Mitsuko (立花満子)	?	Kanna (かんな)	Miyako
3rd	Tachibana Mitsuko (立花満子)	?	Nīya (新屋)	Ciel
3rd	Rei Tā (レイたー)	?	Rei (レイ)	Hisui&Kohaku
3rd	Rei Tā (レイたー)	?	Tā (たー)	Len

Super Street Fighter II X 2 vs. 2 Teams
Place	Team name	Players	Entry name	Characters
1st	Shitofutatabi (使徒再び)	?	Otochun (オトチュン)	X - Chun-Li
1st	Shitofutatabi (使徒再び)	?	ARG	X - Vega (Balrog JP)
2nd	Muteki Fujimi (無敵不死身)	?	Mute Guile (ムテガイル)	X - Guile
2nd	Muteki Fujimi (無敵不死身)	?	Shiki (志木)	X - Balrog (M. Bison JP)
3rd	Kansai DREAM (関西DREAM)	?	GOD Oshima (GOD大嶋)	X - Balrog (M. Bison JP)
3rd	Kansai DREAM (関西DREAM)	?	2 Daime kky (2代目kky)	X - Dhalsim
3rd	Kūchū Yūgi (空中遊戯)	?	Yū (ユウ)	X - M. Bison (Vega JP)
3rd	Kūchū Yūgi (空中遊戯)	?	Noguchi (ノグチ)	X - Vega (Barlog JP)

Guilty Gear XX Λ Core 3 vs. 3 Teams
Place	Team name	Players	Entry name	Characters
1st	Kimi to bokuno Kowareta Sekai (きみとぼくの壊れた世界)	?	N-O (N男)	Venom
1st	Kimi to bokuno Kowareta Sekai (きみとぼくの壊れた世界)	Ryo Nozaki	Dogura (どぐら)	Robo-Ky
1st	Kimi to bokuno Kowareta Sekai (きみとぼくの壊れた世界)	?	Efute (えふて)	May
2nd	En Kimo (エン☆キモ)	?	Muki (むき)	Anji
2nd	En Kimo (エン☆キモ)	?	Mocchī (もっちー)	Bridget
2nd	En Kimo (エン☆キモ)	?	En (エン)	Slayer
3rd	Sengoku Yokaiden Bibiken (戦国妖怪伝びび犬)	?	Kain (カヰン)	Potemkin
3rd	Sengoku Yokaiden Bibiken (戦国妖怪伝びび犬)	?	Maruken (マルケン)	Baiken
3rd	Sengoku Yokaiden Bibiken (戦国妖怪伝びび犬)	?	Nanashi (ななし)	Venom
3rd	Cho Oshidamura (超押田村)	Takahiro Kitano	Nakamura (中村)	Millia
3rd	Cho Oshidamura (超押田村)	Tsuyoshi Oshida	FAB	Potemkin
3rd	Cho Oshidamura (超押田村)	?	Shūto (シュウト)	Axl

Street Fighter III: 3rd Strike 3 vs. 3 Teams
Place	Team name	Players	Entry name	Characters
1st	Inoue JAPAN (井上JAPAN)	?	Kuroda (クロダ)	Akuma
1st	Inoue JAPAN (井上JAPAN)	Testuya Inoue	Inoue (井上)	Makoto
1st	Inoue JAPAN (井上JAPAN)	Joe Egami	MOV	Chun-Li
2nd	(裏切りの星)	?	Saru (猿)	Yun
2nd	(裏切りの星)	?	Chinta (ちんた)	Ken
2nd	(裏切りの星)	?	K	Chun-Li
3rd	Champion road -Michi- (チャンピオンロード～道～)	?	Boss (ボス)	Makoto
3rd	Champion road -Michi- (チャンピオンロード～道～)	?	Rikimaru (力丸)	Chun-Li
3rd	Champion road -Michi- (チャンピオンロード～道～)	?	Ochibi (おちび)	Yun
3rd	Ryuboku (流木)	?	Yuki Otoko (雪男)	Akuma
3rd	Ryuboku (流木)	?	Matsuda (松田)	Yun
3rd	Ryuboku (流木)	Nozomu Umezono	Umezono (梅園)	Chun-Li

Tekken 6: Bloodline Rebellion 3 vs. 3 Teams
Place	Team name	Players	Entry name	Characters
1st	∫∫Egrigori∫∫ (∫∫エグリゴリ∫∫)	?	yoo->sama (★yoo⇒sama★)	Anna
1st	∫∫Egrigori∫∫ (∫∫エグリゴリ∫∫)	?	Haa Guu (はぁ・ぐぅ)	Roger Jr.
1st	∫∫Egrigori∫∫ (∫∫エグリゴリ∫∫)	?	Pekosu (ペこス)	Bob
2nd	RevoLution	?	Deku (デク)	Kazuya
2nd	RevoLution	?	Yukun (ゆうくン♪)	Anna
2nd	RevoLution	?	Yuki (ゆき)	Julia
3rd	Amano (あまの)	?	Hamā (ハマー)	Paul
3rd	Amano (あまの)	?	Fukusu (ふクス)	Leo
3rd	Amano (あまの)	?	Bakushī (ばくし～)	Bryan
3rd	Nocchi (のっち)	?	Oliver (おりばー)	Julia
3rd	Nocchi (のっち)	?	Oujikusu (オウジクス)	Bruce
3rd	Nocchi (のっち)	?	Yamataso (やまたそ)	Marduk

Virtua Fighter 5R 3 vs. 3 Teams
Place	Team name	Players	Entry name	Characters
1st	Harasho (原商)	Hiromiki Kumada	Itabashi Zangief (板橋ザンギエフ)	Shun Di
1st	Harasho (原商)	Keita Ai	Fuudo (ふ〜ど)	Lion
1st	Harasho (原商)	?	JOE	Jacky
2nd	Shibutopia (渋とぴあ)	?	Pochi (ポチ)	Venessa
2nd	Shibutopia (渋とぴあ)	?	Manpuku (魔んぷく)	Lau
2nd	Shibutopia (渋とぴあ)	?	Yoroshiko (よろしこ)	Jeffry
3rd	Typhoon (タイフーン)	?	黒ボンジュール (Kuro Bonjour)	Lau
3rd	Typhoon (タイフーン)	?	珍･健一 (Chin Kenichi)	Shun Di
3rd	Typhoon (タイフーン)	?	やつき (Yatsuki)	Jacky
3rd	Heggie Burst (ヘギーバースト)	?	Auru (あうる)	Aoi
3rd	Heggie Burst (ヘギーバースト)	?	Babuyoshi (ばぶ吉)	Akira
3rd	Heggie Burst (ヘギーバースト)	?	Senningiri Kage (千人斬り☆カゲ)	Kage

== 2009 ==
BlazBlue: Calamity Trigger
Place	Player	Entry name	Character(s)
1st	?	Fumo (ふも)	Arakune
2nd	?	Kyaku (客)	Carl
3rd	?	Kakutō Bijin -Taokaka- (格闘美神〜タオカカ〜)	Nu-13
3rd	Chō Yamashita	Chou (超)	Nu-13

Fate/unlimited codes
Place	Player	Entry name	Character(s)
1st	?	138	Lancer
2nd	?	SPIKE	Gilgamesh
3rd	?	Tatsumi@Mikado Pro Shozoku (たつみP@ミカドプロ所属)	Rin
3rd	?	Chinmi (ちんみ)	Rider

Guilty Gear XX Λ Core 3 vs. 3 Teams
Place	Team name	Players	Entry name	Characters
1st	Shimekairo (閉回路)	?	Megurinne "Kōsoku Seiatsu" Woshige (巡輪廻「光速制圧」ヲシゲ)	Millia
1st	Shimekairo (閉回路)	?	Saegiru Hakusen "Mugen Seisei" N-O (遮る白線「無限生成」N男)	Venom
1st	Shimekairo (閉回路)	?	Wraumeikyu "Zankyō Shōnen" Shōnen (笑う迷宮「残響少年」少年)	Testament
2nd	Omaira Gafude Pikkorosu. (おまいらガー不でピッコロす。)	?	Satoū (さとぅ〜)	Johnny
2nd	Omaira Gafude Pikkorosu. (おまいらガー不でピッコロす。)	?	Mocchī (もっちー)	Bridget
2nd	Omaira Gafude Pikkorosu. (おまいらガー不でピッコロす。)	?	Chonari (ちょなり)	Zappa
3rd	Inoue Gundan Sohonzan (LOL) (イノウエ軍団総本山（笑）)	?	Akira (アキラ)	Potemkin
3rd	Inoue Gundan Sohonzan (LOL) (イノウエ軍団総本山（笑）)	Ryota Inoue	Kazunoko (イノウエ)	Order-Sol
3rd	Inoue Gundan Sohonzan (LOL) (イノウエ軍団総本山（笑）)	?	Kazuki (カズキ)	Dizzy
3rd	Shocker (ショッカー)	?	Kishitaka (キシタカ)	Sol
3rd	Shocker (ショッカー)	?	Hāken (ハーケン)	Potemkin
3rd	Shocker (ショッカー)	?	Koichi (コイチ)	I-No

Tatsunoko vs. Capcom: Cross Generation of Heroes
Place	Player	Entry name	Character(s)
1st	Tarō Ebina	Chargeman Ken (チャージマン健)	Ryu / Ken the Eagle
2nd	?	Ungaikyō (雲外鏡)	Yatterman-1 / Karas
3rd	?	Yawata no Kōtaishi (八幡の皇太子)	PTX-40A
3rd	?	OGTY	Casshan / Ryu

Sugoi! Arcana Heart 2 2 vs. 2 Teams
Place	Team name	Players	Entry name	Characters
1st	Uaaa! Takinobori! (ウァアア！滝登り！)	?	Kasumi LOVE (かすみLOVE)	Akane
1st	Uaaa! Takinobori! (ウァアア！滝登り！)	?	Kami Konoha 12P Color (神このは12Pカラー)	Konoha
2nd	Uaaaa! C Cred! (ウァアアア！Cクレド！)	?	Huttō Mei-Fang (沸騰メイファン)	Mei-Fang
2nd	Uaaaa! C Cred! (ウァアアア！Cクレド！)	?	Texture Elsa (テクスチャエルザ)	Elsa
3rd	Hannichi Kaketemo Tsukimasendeshita (半日かけても着きませんでした)	?	ACT	Maori
3rd	Hannichi Kaketemo Tsukimasendeshita (半日かけても着きませんでした)	?	Jamu (じゃむ)	Lilica
3rd	Yajū Ōkoku (野獣王国)	?	Kyoken (狂犬)	Zenia
3rd	Yajū Ōkoku (野獣王国)	?	Tanukichi (たぬきち)	Saki

Street Fighter III: 3rd Strike 3 vs. 3 Teams
Place	Team name	Players	Entry name	Characters
1st	Peach Power Boss (ピーチパワーボス)	?	Rikimaru (力丸)	Chun-Li
1st	Peach Power Boss (ピーチパワーボス)	?	Boss (ボス)	Yun
1st	Peach Power Boss (ピーチパワーボス)	?	Momochi (ももち)	Makoto
2nd	Kenji ni kakero! (ケンジにかけろ！)	Hajime Taniguchi	Tokido (ときど)	Chun-Li
2nd	Kenji ni kakero! (ケンジにかけろ！)	Kenji Obata	K.O	Yun
2nd	Kenji ni kakero! (ケンジにかけろ！)	?	Ochibi (おちび)	Yang
3rd	Gold Rush (ゴールドラッシュ)	?	Raitei Vanawo (電帝ヴァナヲ)	Ryu
3rd	Gold Rush (ゴールドラッシュ)	?	RX	Urien
3rd	Gold Rush (ゴールドラッシュ)	?	Kōshun (紅春)	Chun-Li
3rd	Inoue JAPAN (井上JAPAN)	?	Kuroda (クロダ)	Q
3rd	Inoue JAPAN (井上JAPAN)	?	MOV	Chun-Li
3rd	Inoue JAPAN (井上JAPAN)	?	Inoue (井上)	Inoue missed competition.

Street Fighter IV 2 vs. 2 Teams
Place	Team name	Players	Entry name	Characters
1st	KOF Zei (KOF勢)	Yōhei Miyahara	Gosho (ごしょ)	Rufus
1st	KOF Zei (KOF勢)	Yuki Ishigaki	Kyabetsu (キャベツ)	C.Viper
2nd	Chiken Groove (チキングルーヴ)	?	Iyo (伊予)	Dhalsim
2nd	Chiken Groove (チキングルーヴ)	Sanshirō Nagai	Shirō (志郎)	Abel
3rd	Namadashi (生だし)	?	Namameso (生めそ)	Honda
3rd	Namadashi (生だし)	?	Dashio (だしお)	C. Viper
3rd	2D Shinto (2D神道)	Kenryō Hayashi; Hyeonhyeong Im	Mago (マゴ)	Sagat
3rd	2D Shinto (2D神道)	Naoki Nemoto	Nemo (ネモ)	Chun-Li

Tekken 6: Bloodline Rebellion 3 vs. 3 Teams
Place	Team name	Players	Entry name	Characters
1st	Sankō Heights (サンコウハイツ)	?	RAUM	Wang
1st	Sankō Heights (サンコウハイツ)	?	Honda (ほんだ)	Lili
1st	Sankō Heights (サンコウハイツ)	?	Junchan (ジュンチャン)	Julia
2nd	Kansai wareware class (関西われわれクラス)	Shimon Kawai	Tissuemon Yokotobi (ティッシュもん横とび)	Marduk
2nd	Kansai wareware class (関西われわれクラス)	?	Buriburi maru (ぶりぶり丸)	Bryan
2nd	Kansai wareware class (関西われわれクラス)	?	Nisshin (にっしん)	Alisa
3rd	Binkan Club (敏感倶楽部)	?	Oujikusu (Amano sosai) (オウジクス（天野総裁）)	Bruce
3rd	Binkan Club (敏感倶楽部)	?	Binkan 1 gō (敏感1号)	Lars
3rd	Binkan Club (敏感倶楽部)	?	Binkan 2 gō (敏感2号)	Bryan
3rd	Kōsuke Produce (こうすけプロデュース)	?	Kōsuke (こうすけ)	Heihachi
3rd	Kōsuke Produce (こうすけプロデュース)	?	Man Kaiō (萬 海王)	King
3rd	Kōsuke Produce (こうすけプロデュース)	?	Chokoyan (チョコやん)	Bob

Virtua Fighter 5R 3 vs. 3 Teams
Place	Team name	Players	Entry name	Characters
1st	Stardust Crusaders (スターダストクルセイダース)	?	Yūtenji (祐天寺)	Lau
1st	Stardust Crusaders (スターダストクルセイダース)	?	Joseph (ジョセフ)	Akira
1st	Stardust Crusaders (スターダストクルセイダース)	?	Gorgeous Irene (ゴージャスアイリーン)	Eileen
2nd	Ibishaanaguma (居飛車穴熊)	?	YOU	Sarah
2nd	Ibishaanaguma (居飛車穴熊)	?	Chūtaro (ちゅーたろ)	Jean
2nd	Ibishaanaguma (居飛車穴熊)	?	Anaguma (穴熊)	Jacky
3rd	APPLE BASIC	Hiromiki Kumada	Itabashi Zangief (板橋ザンギエフ)	Shun Di
3rd	APPLE BASIC	?	Itoshun (イトシュン)	Brad
3rd	APPLE BASIC	Keita Ai	Fuudo (ふ〜ど)	Lion
3rd	Last Boss (ラスボス)	?	Chameleon (カメレオン)	Sarah
3rd	Last Boss (ラスボス)	?	Oniku (お肉)	Jeffry
3rd	Last Boss (ラスボス)	?	King Jō (きんぐじょ〜)	Lau

== 2010 ==
Sengoku Basara X
Place	Player	Entry name	Character(s)
1st	?	Wei=Kubin (ウェイ=クビン)	Mori Motonari
2nd	?	pizza Kazu (pizzaカズ)	Toyotomi Hideyoshi
3rd	?	Jaga (じゃが)	Sanada Yukimura
3rd	?	Nihaha (にはは)	Toyotomi Hideyoshi

The King of Fighters XIII
Place	Player	Entry name	Character(s)
1st	?	Oeppu (おえっぷ)	K' / Mature / Raiden
2nd	?	Gian (ジャイアン)	Mai / Iori / K'
3rd	Yūki Ishigaki	Kyabetsu (キャベツ)	Andy Bogard / K'/ Kula
3rd	Ho Kun Xian	Ho Kun Xian（from Singapore）	Elisabeth / K' / Takuma

The King of Fighters 2002 Unlimited Match
Place	Player	Entry name	Character(s)
1st	?	Oz	Hinako / K' / Nameless
2nd	?	M'	K' / Kula / Nameless
3rd	Yōhei Miyahara	Gosho (ごしょ)	Ryo / Ralf / Jhun
3rd	?	Score (スコア)	K' / Kasumi / King

Melty Blood Actress Again Current Code 2 vs. 2 Teams
Place	Team name	Players	Entry name	Characters
1st	Semete LasBoss rashiku (せめてラスボスらしく)	Goichi Kishida	GO1	Akiha
1st	Semete LasBoss rashiku (せめてラスボスらしく)	?	Ieda (いえだ)	Kohaku
2nd	Garu Shinja (がる信者)	?	Leo (レオ)	Red Arcueid
2nd	Garu Shinja (がる信者)	?	Hato (はと)	Akiha Vermillion
3rd	Inoshi ni makaseta!! (井野氏に任せた！！)	?	Machida no Mouken (町田の猛犬)	Kishima
3rd	Inoshi ni makaseta!! (井野氏に任せた！！)	?	Ikebukuro no hanzaisha (池袋の犯罪者)	Sion TATARI
3rd	Tales of Pants wrestling (テイルズオブパンツレスリング )	?	Tatsuya (たつや)	Ciel
3rd	Tales of Pants wrestling (テイルズオブパンツレスリング )	?	Ekusu (エクス)	Nrvnqsr

Blazblue: Continuum Shift 2 vs. 2 Teams
Place	Team name	Players	Entry name	Characters
1st	Chō Maōmura (超魔王村)	?	Tsujikawa (辻川)	Taokaka
1st	Chō Maōmura (超魔王村)	Chō Yamashita	Chou (超)	Litchi
2nd	Daimaō (大魔王)	?	Akunin (悪人)	Bang
2nd	Daimaō (大魔王)	?	Hiroshi (ひろし)	Jin
3rd	Aki Star (あき☆すた)	?	Goro@Aiseimei (ごろ@愛生命)	Lambda-11
3rd	Aki Star (あき☆すた)	?	Fumo (ふも)	Arakune
3rd	Darahima (どらひま)	?	Tenkaichi no Sukimono (天下一の傾奇者)	Bang
3rd	Darahima (どらひま)	?	Hima (ヒマ)	Arakune

Arcana Heart 3 2 vs. 2 Teams
Place	Team name	Players	Entry name	Characters
1st	Tanukichi Aitō 3 (たぬきち追悼3)	?	Kasumi Love (かすみLOVE)	Akane
1st	Tanukichi Aitō 3 (たぬきち追悼3)	?	Tono (殿このは)	Konoha
2nd	Hikago (ヒカゴ)	?	Kyōken (狂犬)	Zenia
2nd	Hikago (ヒカゴ)	?	Shirogoma (しろごま)	Angelia
3rd	Anaan (アンアアン)	?	Andū (あんどぅ～)	Catherine
3rd	Anaan (アンアアン)	?	Banbaban (バンババン)	Heart
3rd	Iwabuchi azechi (いわぶちあぜち)	?	Ōen (おーえん)	Kira
3rd	Iwabuchi azechi (いわぶちあぜち)	?	Buchi (ぶち)	Yoriko

Street Fighter IV 3 vs. 3 Teams
Place	Team name	Players	Entry name	Characters
1st	Okozukai \2000 (おこづかい2000円)	Yōsuke Ito	Kindevu (金デヴ)	Rufus
1st	Okozukai \2000 (おこづかい2000円)	Yūsuke Momochi	Momochi (ももち)	Akuma
1st	Okozukai \2000 (おこづかい2000円)	Ryōta Fukumoto	RF (あーるえふ)	Sagat
2nd	Takedake (武田家)	?	Chūashi Zesshō TKD (中足絶唱TKD)	El Fuerte
2nd	Takedake (武田家)	Masato Takahashi	Bonchan (ボンちゃん)	Sagat
2nd	Takedake (武田家)	Daigo Umehara	Umehara (ウメハラ)	Ryu
3rd	HEROES	Naoki Nemoto	Nemo (ネモ)	Chun-Li
3rd	HEROES	Kenryō Hayashi; Hyeonhyeong Im	Mago (マゴ)	Sagat
3rd	HEROES	Hajime Taniguchi	Tokido (ときど)	Akuma
3rd	Hokkaidō Saikyo (北海道最強)	?	Dashimaki Tamago (だしまき卵)	C. Viper
3rd	Hokkaidō Saikyo (北海道最強)	?	Nebari (粘)	Rufus
3rd	Hokkaidō Saikyo (北海道最強)	?	Denpa (電波)	Sagat

Tekken 6: Bloodline Rebellion 3 vs. 3 Teams
Place	Team name	Players	Entry name	Characters
1st	Kankō Main (観光メイン)	?	Smile X (スマイルX)	Marduk
1st	Kankō Main (観光メイン)	?	Nesu Chan (ねすちゃん)	Devil Jin
1st	Kankō Main (観光メイン)	?	Tatatatatatatatāku (たたたたたたたたーく)	Lars
2nd	Chiba Daihyō (千葉代表)	?	Daipan (ダイパン)	スティーブ
2nd	Chiba Daihyō (千葉代表)	?	Panda Mania (パンダマニア)	Panda
2nd	Chiba Daihyō (千葉代表)	?	Cendrillon Pekosu (サンドリヨンペこス)	Bob
3rd	why works	?	Reimen Seijin (冷麺星人) (from Korea)	Rodger Jr.
3rd	why works	?	addoong (from Korea)	Asuka
3rd	why works	?	narakhof (from Korea)	Marduk
3rd	Sapporo Muscats (札幌マスカッツ)	?	Sei King (セイキング)	King
3rd	Sapporo Muscats (札幌マスカッツ)	?	Ide (イデ)	Bob
3rd	Sapporo Muscats (札幌マスカッツ)	?	Agichi (あぎち)	Leo

Street Fighter III: 3rd Strike 3 vs. 3 Teams
Place	Team name	Players	Entry name	Characters
1st	Inoue JAPAN (井上JAPAN)	?	Kuroda (クロダ)	Ken
1st	Inoue JAPAN (井上JAPAN)	?	DD Nitto (DDにっと)	Yun
1st	Inoue JAPAN (井上JAPAN)	Joe Egami	MOV	Chun-Li
2nd	Kyojin gun (巨人軍)	Katsuhisa Ōta	Kokujin (こくじん)	Dudley
2nd	Kyojin gun (巨人軍)	Tatsuya Haitani	Haitani (ハイタニ)	Makoto
2nd	Kyojin gun (巨人軍)	Shinya Ōnuki	Nuki (ヌキ)	Chun-Li
3rd	KO Family (KOファミリー)	Kenji Obata	Kenzo (ケンゾー)	Yang
3rd	KO Family (KOファミリー)	?	Ochibi (おちび)	Yun
3rd	KO Family (KOファミリー)	Hajime Taniguchi	Tokido (ときど)	Chun-Li
3rd	Marvelous Heroes (マーベラスヒーローズ☆)	Tōru Hashimoto	Raō (ラオウ)	Chun-Li
3rd	Marvelous Heroes (マーベラスヒーローズ☆)	?	Mesta (メスター)	Yun
3rd	Marvelous Heroes (マーベラスヒーローズ☆)	?	Higa (ヒガ)	Ibuki

Guilty Gear XX Λ Core 3 vs. 3 Teams
Place	Team name	Players	Entry name	Characters
1st	Gin to Kin (銀と金)	?	Shōnen (少年)	Testament
1st	Gin to Kin (銀と金)	Ryōta Fukumoto	RF	Faust
1st	Gin to Kin (銀と金)	Kenichi Ogawa	Fiogaln (フィオガルン)	Eddie
2nd	Team Akatengu (チーム赤天狗)	Tsuyoshi Oshida	FAB	Potemkin
2nd	Team Akatengu (チーム赤天狗)	Ryota Inoue	Kazunoko (イノウエ)	Order-Sol
2nd	Team Akatengu (チーム赤天狗)	?	Masahiro (まさひろ)	Testament
3rd	Inageno Tsurugi (イナゲノツルギ)	?	Ina (イナ)	Millia
3rd	Inageno Tsurugi (イナゲノツルギ)	?	Nage (ナゲ)	Faust
3rd	Inageno Tsurugi (イナゲノツルギ)	?	Mitsurugi (ミツルギ)	Zappa
3rd	Mezurashiku Chikakukarakita (めずらしく近くからきた )	?	Isamu (勇)	Venom
3rd	Mezurashiku Chikakukarakita (めずらしく近くからきた )	?	Roi (ロイ)	Sol
3rd	Mezurashiku Chikakukarakita (めずらしく近くからきた )	?	LOX	Jam

Super Street Fighter II X 3 vs. 3 Teams
Place	Team name	Players	Entry name	Characters
1st	Best Partners (ベストパートナーズ)	?	MAO	Claw
1st	Best Partners (ベストパートナーズ)	?	Futachan (フタチャン)	Ryu
1st	Best Partners (ベストパートナーズ)	?	Itō (イトー)	Dee Jay
2nd	Italia (イタリア)	?	Abebin (あべびん)	Honda
2nd	Italia (イタリア)	?	Sasori (さそり)	Ryu
2nd	Italia (イタリア)	?	Ōnishi (オオニシ)	Balrog
3rd	Chō Muteki Fujimi (超無敵不死身)	?	Nuki (ヌキ)	Chun-Li
3rd	Chō Muteki Fujimi (超無敵不死身)	?	Mute Guile (むてガイル)	Guile
3rd	Chō Muteki Fujimi (超無敵不死身)	?	Shiki (志木)	Bison
3rd	Shin Soldier Team (真ソルジャーチーム)	?	Tsūjī (つ～じ～)	Bison
3rd	Shin Soldier Team (真ソルジャーチーム)	?	Inrō (いんろ～)	Chun-Li
3rd	Shin Soldier Team (真ソルジャーチーム)	?	Danjiri (だんじり)	Dhalsim

Virtua Fighter 5 Final Showdown 3 vs. 3 Teams
Place	Team name	Players	Entry name	Characters
1st	Jiyū Kaidō (自由街道)	?	Serori (セロリ)	Kage-Maru
1st	Jiyū Kaidō (自由街道)	?	Morimoto Leotard (森本レオタード)	Vanessa
1st	Jiyū Kaidō (自由街道)	?	Haragana de naoki (ひらがなであおき)	Jacky
2nd	Dai Shinsekai (大新世界)	?	Jaga (じゃが)	Goh
2nd	Dai Shinsekai (大新世界)	?	Kurobō (くろぼ～)	Lau
2nd	Dai Shinsekai (大新世界)	?	Yoroshiko (よろしこ)	Jeffry
3rd	Stardust Crusaders (スターダストクルセーダース)	?	Gorgeous Irene (ゴージャスアイリーン)	Eileen
3rd	Stardust Crusaders (スターダストクルセーダース)	?	Joseph (ジョセフ)	Akira
3rd	Stardust Crusaders (スターダストクルセーダース)	?	Yūtenji (祐天寺)	Lau
3rd	Romancing Saru (ロマンシング猿)	?	Baidā man (バイダーマン)	Kage-Maru
3rd	Romancing Saru (ロマンシング猿)	?	Itoshun (イトシュン)	Brad
3rd	Romancing Saru (ロマンシング猿)	Hiromiki Kumada	Itabashi Zangief (板橋ザンギエフ)	Shun

== 2011 ==
Super Street Fighter IV Arcade Edition 2 vs. 2 Teams
Place	Team name	Players	Entry name	Characters
1st	Ōnens (オーネンズ)	Ryōta Inoue	Kazunoko (かずのこ)	Yun
1st	Ōnens (オーネンズ)	?	Ojisan Boy (おじさん)	Yang
2nd	Star Mountain (スターマウンテン)	Naoki Nemoto	Nemo (ネモ)	Yang
2nd	Star Mountain (スターマウンテン)	Yūki Ishigaki	Kyabetsu (キャベツ)	C. Viper
3rd	Akabane Ichigun (アカバネ一軍)	Daigo Umehara	Umehara (ウメハラ)	Yun
3rd	Akabane Ichigun (アカバネ一軍)	?	Iyo (伊予)	Ibuki
3rd	Shin-Armageddon (真・アーマゲドン)	?	Michael Tan (マイケルたん)	Ken
3rd	Shin-Armageddon (真・アーマゲドン)	?	Hachigashira San (はちがしらさん)	Yun

Super Street Fighter II Turbo 3 vs. 3 Teams
Place	Team name	Players	Entry name	Characters
1st	TR Butai TEAM OSD (TR部隊 TEAM OSD)	?	Okafei (オカフェイ)	Fei Long
1st	TR Butai TEAM OSD (TR部隊 TEAM OSD)	?	Seki (セキ)	Dee Jay
1st	TR Butai TEAM OSD (TR部隊 TEAM OSD)	?	Shooting D (シューティングD)	Ryu
2nd	Saigo no shito(最後の使徒)	?	Otochun (オトチュン)	Chun-Li
2nd	Saigo no shito(最後の使徒)	?	ARG	Barlog
2nd	Saigo no shito(最後の使徒)	?	Gunze (グンゼ)	Zangief
3rd	Midorimushi (ミドリムシ)	?	KKY	Dhalsim
3rd	Midorimushi (ミドリムシ)	?	Kikai (機械)	Guile
3rd	Midorimushi (ミドリムシ)	?	M Tsun (Mつん)	Ken
3rd	KYY	?	Yūvega (ユウベガ)	M. Bison(Vega JP)
3rd	KYY	?	Yoshimura (ヨシムラ)	Dhalsim
3rd	KYY	?	Kēshin (ケーシン)	Chun-Li

BlazBlue: Continuum Shift II
Place	Player	Entry name	Character(s)
1st	?	Conan (コナン)	Tsubaki
2nd	?	Takahashi (タカハシ)	Noel
3rd	?	Juice dai Harainikita (ジュース代払いにきた)	Bang
3rd	?	R-2	Noel

Aquapazza: Aquaplus Dream Match
Place	Player	Entry name	Character(s)
1st	Goichi Kishida	GO1	Riannon / Yuki
2nd	?	Butter@KOF Zei (バター@KOF勢)	Konomi / Yuki
3rd	Kenichi Ogawa	Daikenja Ogamu (大賢者オガム)	Konomi
3rd	?	Warz (ウォーズ)	Konomi

== 2012 ==
Super Street Fighter IV Arcade Edition 2012 3 vs. 3 Teams
Place	Team name	Players	Entry name	Characters
1st	Kachitagari (勝ちたがり)	Keita Ai	Fuudo (ふ〜ど)	Fei Long
1st	Kachitagari (勝ちたがり)	Masato Takahashi	Bonchan (ボンちゃん)	Sagat
1st	Kachitagari (勝ちたがり)	Ryōta Inoue	Kazunoko (かずのこ)	Yun
2nd	Purupuru (ぷるぷる)	?	Kuroken (くろけん)	Dudley
2nd	Purupuru (ぷるぷる)	?	Y. (Y。)	Cammy
2nd	Purupuru (ぷるぷる)	?	Kawaguuchi (かわぐぅち)	Rose
3rd	Kodak gun with Uryo (コダック軍 with うりょ)	Ryō Takehara	Uryo (うりょ)	Sakura
3rd	Kodak gun with Uryo (コダック軍 with うりょ)	Yūsuke Momochi	Momochi (ももち)	Cody
3rd	Kodak gun with Uryo (コダック軍 with うりょ)	Tatsuya Haitani	Haitani (ハイタニ)	Makoto
3rd	TEAM TAIWAN	Yu-Lin "Bruce" Hsiang	GamerBee (from Taiwan)	Adon
3rd	TEAM TAIWAN	Arubi Kao	RB (from Taiwan)	Guy
3rd	TEAM TAIWAN	Hsien Chang	Hsien Chang (from Taiwan)	Yun

Virtua Fighter 5 Final Showdown 3 vs. 3 Teams
Place	Team name	Players	Entry name	Characters
1st	Newton (ニュートン)	?	Koiwai (こいわい)	Lion
1st	Newton (ニュートン)	?	Kaibutsu (かいぶつ)	Vanessa
1st	Newton (ニュートン)	?	Baribarikun (ばりばりくん)	Lei-Fei
2nd	Kibo no Hoshi (希望の星)	?	Hima Jean (暇ジャン)	Jean Kujo
2nd	Kibo no Hoshi (希望の星)	?	Shiwa (しわ）	Pai Chan
2nd	Kibo no Hoshi (希望の星)	?	Doreiku (どれいく)	Brad Burns
3rd	Sawayaka Sankumi (さわやか三組)	?	Chaba Sanako (千葉さな子)	Aoi Umenokoji
3rd	Sawayaka Sankumi (さわやか三組)	?	Puuta (ぷうた)	Jean Kujo
3rd	Sawayaka Sankumi (さわやか三組)	?	Chabozu (茶坊主)	Lei-Fei
3rd	Penki MAX (ペンキMAX)	?	Penkiyasan (ペンキ屋さん)	Lau Chan
3rd	Penki MAX (ペンキMAX)	?	Kumicho (組長)	Wolf Hawkfield
3rd	Penki MAX (ペンキMAX)	?	Yoko Kage (ヨゴ★カゲ)	Kage-Maru

Tekken Tag Tournament 2 2 vs. 2 Teams
Place	Team name	Players	Entry name	Characters
1st	specialist (JP)	Akihiro Abe	FRB AO	Alisa / Miguel
1st	specialist (JP)	?	LATHIN	Leo / Lars
2nd	najin smash	Hyun-Jin Kim	JDCR (from Korea)	Armor King
2nd	najin smash	?	ACE (from Korea)	Devil Jin / Kazuya
3rd	NoRespect	Kato Yuji	Yū (ユウ)	Leo / Feng
3rd	NoRespect	Daichi Nakayama	Nobi (ノビ)	Dragunov / Lars
3rd	Revolution	?	Yuki (ユキ)	JayCee / Armor King
3rd	Revolution	?	Ryō (りょう)	Devil Jin / Heihachi

Soul Calibur V
Place	Player	Entry name	Character(s)
1st	?	Crna ruka	Patroklos
2nd	Naoaki Yanagihara	Dekopon (デコポン)	Tira
3rd	?	Chanzono (ちゃんぞの)	Hilde
3rd	?	Chanoyu (茶の湯)	Astaroth

Ultimate Marvel vs. Capcom 3
Place	Player	Entry name	Character(s)
1st	Justin Wong	EG Justin Wong (from USA)	Wolverine / Storm / Akuma
2nd	Tsutomu Kubota	kubo	Vergil / X-23 / Dante
3rd	?	G.X	Nathan Spencer / Hulk / Doctor Doom
3rd	?	Frīda (ふり～だ)	Zero / Dante / Magneto

Street Fighter III: 3rd Strike 3 vs. 3 Teams
Place	Team name	Players	Entry name	Characters
1st	Kuroda no kanojo boshūchū (クロダの彼女募集中)	?	Kuroda (クロダ)	Oro
1st	Kuroda no kanojo boshūchū (クロダの彼女募集中)	?	Boss (ボス)	Yun
1st	Kuroda no kanojo boshūchū (クロダの彼女募集中)	Joe Egami	MOV	Chun-Li
2nd	Chō Genmitsu Gumi (超厳密組)	?	Genki (元気)	Alex
2nd	Chō Genmitsu Gumi (超厳密組)	?	Ike (アイク)	Dudley
2nd	Chō Genmitsu Gumi (超厳密組)	?	Pierrot (ピエロ)	Remy
3rd	Pizza Stream (ピザストリーム)	Shinya Ōnuki	Nuki (ヌキ)	Chun-Li
3rd	Pizza Stream (ピザストリーム)	?	Tokura (トクラ)	Yang
3rd	Pizza Stream (ピザストリーム)	Katsuhisa Ōta	Kokujin (こくじん)	Dudley
3rd	Big Bang (ビッグバン)	Kenji Obata	KO	Yang
3rd	Big Bang (ビッグバン)	?	Ochibi (おちび)	Yun
3rd	Big Bang (ビッグバン)	?	Rikimaru (力丸)	Chun Li

Persona 4 Arena
Place	Player	Entry name	Character(s)
1st	?	Shūto (シュウト)	Mitsuru
2nd	?	Haechan (蝿ちゃん)	Chie
3rd	?	Denpa@Ezoshinja (電波@エゾ信者)	Naoto
3rd	?	Shingo (シンゴ)	Akihiko

Aquapazza Version 2.0 2 vs. 2 Teams
Place	Team name	Players	Entry name	Characters
1st	QZ Tou@KOF Zei?! (QZ党@KOF勢？！)	?	OZ	Chizuru / Llyr
1st	QZ Tou@KOF Zei?! (QZ党@KOF勢？！)	?	Butter	Konomi / Mizuki
2nd	Kouyā Game (コウヤーゲーム)	?	Akiyama Kōya (秋山虎也)	Chizuru / Ma-ryan
2nd	Kouyā Game (コウヤーゲーム)	?	Kanzaki Naoto (神崎直人)	Touka / Satsuki
3rd	Moebuta no Atsumari@QZ Tou (萌え豚の集まり@QZ党)	?	Daigo Hei (ダイゴ兵)	Karula / Rina
3rd	Moebuta no Atsumari@QZ Tou (萌え豚の集まり@QZ党)	?	Saginomiya (鷺ノ宮)	Tamaki / Urtori
3rd	Team ha Amae (チームは甘え)	?	Itorin (いとりん)	Morgan / Rina

== Players with multiple championships ==
Total top 4's ꜛ	Player	Alias	Wins	1st places	2nd places	3rd places
9	Shinya Ōnuki	(Japan) Nuki (ヌキ)	2005 - Street Fighter III: 3rd Strike (2v2); 2007 - Hyper Street Fighter II (2v2)	2	2	5
7	Daigo Umehara	(Japan) Umehara (ウメハラ)	2003 - Super Street Fighter II Turbo (3v3); 2005 - Street Fighter III: 3rd Strike (2v2)	2	3	2
7	Hajime Taniguchi	(Japan) Tokido (ときど)	2003 - Capcom vs. SNK 2 (1v1); 2005 - Capcom Fighting Jam (2v2)	2	1	4
5	Joe Egami	(Japan) MOV	2006 - Street Fighter III: 3rd Strike (3v3); 2008 - Street Fighter III: 3rd Strike (3v3); 2010 - Street Fighter III: 3rd Strike (3v3); 2012 - Street Fighter III: 3rd Strike (3v3)	4		1
5		(Japan) Kuroda (クロダ)	2008 - Street Fighter III: 3rd Strike (3v3); 2010 - Street Fighter III: 3rd Strike (3v3); 2012 - Street Fighter III: 3rd Strike (3v3)	3		2
5		(Japan) Boss (ボス)	2009 - Street Fighter III: 3rd Strike (3v3); 2012 - Street Fighter III: 3rd Strike (3v3)	2		3
5	Yūki Ishigaki	(Japan) Kyabetsu (キャベツ)	2005 - The King of Fighters Neowave (1v1); 2009 - Street Fighter IV (2v2)	2	1	2
5	Kenryō Hayashi Hyeonhyeong Im	(Japan) Mago (マゴ)	2004 - Capcom vs. SNK 2 (3v3); 2005 - Capcom Fighting Jam (2v2)	2		3
4	Keita Ai	(Japan) Fuudo (ふ〜ど)	2005 - Virtua Fighter 4: Final Tuned (3v3); 2008 - Virtua Fighter 5R (3v3); 2012 - Super Street Fighter IV Arcade Edition 2012 (3v3)	3		1
4	Ryōta Inoue	(Japan) Kazunoko	2011 - Super Street Fighter IV Arcade Edition (2v2); 2012 - Super Street Fighter IV Arcade Edition 2012 (3v3)	2	1	1
4	Wraumeikyu Shōnen	(Japan) Shōnen (少年)	2009 - Guilty Gear XX Λ Core (3v3); 2010 - Guilty Gear XX Λ Core (3v3)	2		2
4	Ryōta Fukumoto	(Japan) RF (あーるえふ)	2010 - Street Fighter IV (3v3); 2010 - Guilty Gear XX Λ Core (3v3)	2		2
3		(Japan) Yukinose (ゆきのせ)	2003 - Guilty Gear XX (3v3); 2004 - Guilty Gear XX #Reload (3v3); 2006 - Guilty Gear XX Slash (3v3)	3		
3	Yōsuke Itō	(Japan) Kindevu (金デヴ)	2004 - Capcom vs. SNK 2 (3v3); 2010 - Street Fighter IV (3v3)	2		1
3	Yūsuke Momochi	(Japan) Momochi (ももち)	2009 - Street Fighter III: 3rd Strike (3v3); 2010 - Street Fighter IV (3v3)	2		1
3	Yōhei Miyahara	(Japan) Gosho (ごしょ)	2003 - The King of Fighters 2002 (1v1); 2009 - Street Fighter IV (2v2)	2		1
3		(Japan) Otochun (オトチュン)	2003 - Super Street Fighter II Turbo (3v3); 2008 - Super Street Fighter II X (2v2)	2	1	
3		(Japan) Spermaster J (スペルマスターJ)	2004 - Street Fighter III: 3rd Strike (3v3); 2006 - Street Fighter III: 3rd Strike (3v3)	2	1	
3		(Japan) kaqn	2003 - Guilty Gear XX (3v3); 2005 - Guilty Gear XX #Reload (3v3)	2	1	
2		(Japan) Oz	2010 - The King of Fighters 2002 Unlimited Match (1v1); 2012 - Aquapazza Version 2.0 (2v2)	2		
2	Goichi Kishida	(Japan) GO1	2010 - Melty Blood Actress Again Current Code (2v2); 2011 - Aquapazza: Aquaplus Dream Match (1v1)	2		
2		(Japan) Kasumi LOVE (かすみLOVE)	2009 - Sugoi! Arcana Heart 2 (2v2); 2010 - Arcana Heart 3 (2v2)	2		
2		(Japan) DD Nitto (DDにっと)	2006 - Street Fighter III: 3rd Strike (3v3); 2010 - Street Fighter III: 3rd Strike (3v3)	2		
2		(Japan) Kurahashi (クラハシ)	2003 - Super Street Fighter II Turbo (3v3); 2007 - Hyper Street Fighter II (2v2)	2		
2		(Japan) Niga (にが)	2006 - Melty Blood: Act Cadenza (2v2); 2007 - Guilty Gear XX Λ Core (3v3)	2		
2	Kenichi Ogawa	(Japan) Ogawa (小川)	2005 - Guilty Gear XX #Reload (3v3); 2007 - Guilty Gear XX Λ Core (3v3)	2		
2		(Japan) Game Center Arashi (ゲームセンター嵐)	2003 - Virtua Fighter 4: Evolution (3v3); 2006 - Virtua Fighter 4: Final Tuned (3v3)	2		
2		(Japan) Inocchi (いのっち)	2004 - Virtua Fighter 4: Evolution (3v3); 2005 - Virtua Fighter 4: Final Tuned (3v3)	2		
