= Arcana Heart (video game) =

2006 video game

- Developer: Yuki Enterprise (Note: Full! arcade patch by Examu, ported to PlayStation 2 by Ecole Software)
- Publishers: Arcade: JP: Atrativa Japan; JP: Examu (Full!); PlayStation 2: JP: AQ Interactive; NA: Atlus
- Producer: Yasuo Tanaka
- Designer: Tōru Sakurai
- Writer: Tōru Sakurai
- Composer: Motoharu Yoshihira
- Series: Arcana Heart
- Platforms: Arcade, PlayStation 2
- Release: Arcade: JP: December 22, 2006; JP: April 17, 2007 (Full!); PlayStation 2: JP: October 11, 2007; NA: April 10, 2008
- Genre: Fighting
- Modes: Single-player; Multiplayer
- Arcade system: Interpark NEXUS 3D hardware

Arcana Heart (Note: Japanese: アルカナハート, Hepburn: Arukana Hāto) is a 2006 fighting arcade game originally developed by Yuki Enterprise and published by Atrativa Japan. The first installment in the Arcana Heart series, the game features an original all-female cast of eleven young girls known as "Maidens", who possess the ability to communicate with beings from the Elemental world known as "Arcana", to avoid a catastrophic event taking place in Tokyo involving the reunification of both Earth and the Elemental world as one by the Ministry of Elemental Affairs. Its gameplay consists of one-on-one fights, with a main four-button configuration, featuring special and super techniques, as well as four playable modes.

Arcana Heart was created by members at Yuki Enterprise who previously worked on both Samurai Shodown V and Samurai Shodown V Special, with Tōru Sakurai serving as designer and scenario writer. In 2007, Examu released a single custom chip patch for arcades titled Arcana Heart Full!, which introduced a number of fixes and balances. It was later ported to PlayStation 2 by Ecole Software, featuring the ability of playing characters in "Original" or "Full" modes, reflecting their original and patched arcade versions.

Arcana Heart garnered positive reception from critics since its release on PlayStation 2; praise was given to the hand-drawn graphics, character roster, gameplay, and multiplayer but criticism was geared towards the high learning curve and complexity for newcomers, lack of additional content, and balancing issues in the single-player modes, with some feeling divided in regards to the sound design. It was followed by two sequels: Arcana Heart 2 (2008) and Arcana Heart 3 (2011).

== Gameplay ==
PlayStation 2 version screenshot showcasing a match between Heart Aino and Saki Tsuzura.

Arcana Heart is an airborne-based fighting game reminiscent of Asuka 120% Limited Burning Fest and Guilty Gear. The player fights against other opponents in one-on-one matches and the fighter who manages to deplete the health bar of the opponent wins the first round. The first to win two rounds becomes the winner of the match. Each round is timed; if both fighters still have health remaining when time expires, the fighter with more health wins the round. It uses a four-button layout, three of which are responsible for the attacks and the other one is for both homing attacks and Arcana-specific actions. It features three modes: Story, Arcade, Versus, and Training. In single-player mode, players can choose from eleven playable characters and fight against computer-controlled fighters. If all of the opponents are defeated, the player will be able to fight against Mildred Avallone. Special moves are performed by entering button commands while pressing the D-pad.

Notable features in Arcana Heart are the elemental Arcana spirits and homing mechanic; after selecting a character, players also choose an Arcana to compliment each character with extra special moves and augmentations from more than 100 combinations. Players can also perform a "Arcana Burst" once per round by pressing the three attack buttons to receive benefits during battle until its gauge bar is depleted. Once the Arcana Burst is activated, players can perform a super move called "Arcana Blaze". However, the benefits received from Arcana Burst and performance of the Arcana Blaze change depending on the chosen Arcana spirit. The homing mechanic automatically tracks the opponent with a single button and these actions are performed by using the homing gauge.

== Synopsis ==
Arcana Heart takes place in Tokyo and revolves around the Earth and the Elemental world, both of which previously existed as one but were separated for unknown causes and now exists in parallel boundaries, which are becoming more ambiguous. Mildred Avallone of Ministry of Elemental Affairs wishes to remove the barrier and merge the two worlds together but doing so could prove catastrophic. Eleven young girls known as "Maidens", who possess the ability to communicate with beings from the Elemental world known as "Arcana", attempt to stop the event.

=== Characters ===
Heart Aino (愛乃 はぁと, Aino Hāto)

Voiced by: Mikako Takahashi
Heart Aino is a normal high school student who shares a passion for animals, She is the main protagonist of the game. She also assists her mother in running the family-owned restaurant Cafe Aino, and hopes to one day make something that can be placed on Cafe Aino's menu. Her Arcana is Partinias, the Arcana of Love. An angel with two pairs of wings who can manipulate light, she is Heart's partner and friend.

Saki Tsuzura (廿楽 冴姫, Tsuzura Saki)

Voiced by: Yumi Shimura
Saki Tsuzura is Heart's childhood friend, who two years ago went to live in England due to her father's work. While there, she and her friend Fiona visited a mountain range, and were sucked into the Elemental World. While Fiona was unable to return, Saki was saved by her Arcana, Bhanri, the Arcana of Lightning. Bhanri resembles a woman trapped in a giant crystal and was once a queen revered as the Goddess of War.

Kamui Tokinomiya (朱鷺宮 神依, Tokinomiya Kamui)

Voiced by: Hiromi Hirata
Kamui Tokinomiya is also known as the Thousand Years Protector, who works with the Ministry of Elemental Affairs to protect the human world from crisis. She remains in a state of perpetual slumber until awakened by her Arcana Anutpada, the Arcana of Time. It is a mysterious clock-like mechanism that has lasted since ancient times and has the ability to manipulate time and space at will.

Konoha (このは)

Voiced by: Mayumi Yoshida
Konoha is from the Koinumaru clan of ninja warriors; members of her clan have the ears and a tail of a dog. Every time the Thousand Years Protector awakes, a member from the Koinumaru clan is selected to become the Millennium Guard and accompany her on her mission. Konoha's Arcana is Moriomoto, the Arcana of Nature, who has the ability to freely manipulate plants.

Maori Kasuga (春日 舞織, Kasuga Maori)

Voiced by: Maki Tsuchiya
Maori Kasuga comes from a family who has been performing blessings, exorcisms, purifications, and other rituals to assist in all matters related to the Elemental world for centuries. Maori lives with her older sister Tsuzune (春日 鼓音, Kasuga Tsuzune) and her younger sisters Koito (春日 小糸, Kasuga Koito) and Kouta (春日 小唄, Kasuga Kouta), whom she directs during the rituals. Her Arcana is Ohtsuchi, the Arcana of Earth, a giant clay figure that draws its power from the faith of mankind.

Mei-Fang (美凰, Meifan; Pinyin: Měihuáng)

Voiced by: Juri Takita
Mei-Fang is not actually a girl, but a product of China's technological advances: a humanoid robot created by Professor Mei Ling Hua, a colleague of Kira Daidohji. Mei-Fang was programmed with 4,000 years' worth of Chinese recipes and a wide array of martial arts knowledge. Her Arcana is Lang-Gong, the Arcana of Fire, a wolf that lived an extremely long life in Shangri-La and seeks further evolution.

Kira Daidohji (大道寺 きら, Daidōji Kira)

Voiced by: Hiromi Tsunakake
Kira Daidohji is a child prodigy who earned a doctorate in elemental science at a prestigious American university, but on her return to Japan, was forced to attend elementary school. This made her bitter and she became arrogant and condescending, deciding to embark on a quest for world domination. She was invited by the Rosenberg branch to monitor spirit disasters in Japan. She fights using a giant semi-solid blob which she controls through her Arcana, the leviathan Niptra, the Arcana of Water.

Lilica Felchenerow (リリカ・フェルフネロフ, Ririka Ferufunerofu)

Voiced by: Mayako Nigo
Lilica Felchenerow is the daughter of a human mother and a demon father. She enjoys skipping school and skating around town on the roller blades her father bought her, which she enhanced with ether-powered motors. Her Arcana is Tempestas, the Arcana of Wind, who was once gravely wounded but nursed back to health by Lilica.

Yoriko Yasuzumi (安栖 頼子, Yasuzumi Yoriko)

Voiced by: Yui Itsuki
Yoriko Yasuzumi is introverted, bookish, and fascinated with the occult. One night, with Lilica's help, she decided to try to summon a low-level demon servant for herself. As a prank, Lilica re-drew the magic circle, and Yoriko summoned Mike, the self-proclaimed "Demon King". A contract was formed between the two of them, and now she is unable to part with him. Her Arcana is Dieu Mort, the Arcana of Death. He was formerly a man sentenced to be executed known as the "God of Death".

Lieselotte Achenbach (リーゼロッテ・アッヒェンバッハ, Rīzerotte Ahhyenbahha)

Voiced by: Yōko Honda
Lieselotte Achenbach, the "Crimson-Eyed Criminal", became a cold-hearted assassin after losing her family. She travels the world alone, accompanied only by a leg-less ball-jointed puppet which carries the consciousness of Elfriede (エルフリーデ, Erufurīde), her older sister. Her Arcana is Gier, the Arcana of Shadow, a creature composed of purely negative emotions that Lieselotte summons with drops of her own blood.

Fiona Mayfield (フィオナ・メイフィールド, Fiona Meifīrudo)

Voiced by: Maria Yamamoto
Fiona Mayfield hails from a wealthy family in Britain. She became good friends with Saki (who came to Britain as an exchange student from Japan) until one fateful day when they were both sucked into the Elemental world. Saki managed to escape, but Fiona was trapped and now seeks to find a way back home, with the help of Mildred. Her Arcana is Oreichalkos, the Arcana of Metal, a reptilian beast believed to be the oldest Arcana in existence.

Mildred Avallone (ミルドレッド・アヴァロン, Mirudoreddo Avaron)

Voiced by: Yukiko Kikuchi
Mildred Avallone is the main antagonist and final boss of the game. Formerly the chief secretary of the Ministry of Elemental Affairs, her ambition is to merge the human and elemental worlds and attain god-like powers. She uses all of the characters' Arcanas.

== Development ==
Arcana Heart was created by members at Yuki Enterprise who previously worked on both Samurai Shodown V and Samurai Shodown V Special, with Tōru Sakurai acting as designer and scenario writer, while Yasuo Tanaka served as producer. The soundtrack was scored by composer Motoharu Yoshihira. Sakurai recounted the project's development process and history through various Japanese publications such as Dengeki Online.

== Release ==
Arcana Heart was first released in Japanese arcades by Atrativa Japan on December 22, 2006. Prior to its launch, it was first playtested on October of the same year and garnered positive reception from players. On April 17, 2007, Examu released a patch for the game titled Arcana Heart Full!. The patch fixed a variety of issues, toning down overly-powerful characters and "buffing up" weaker characters but controversy arose when the patch, which was physically housed on a single custom chip, was priced at ¥78,000 each whereas similar patches for similar games have been released for free. Arcana Heart Full! also made an appearance at Tougeki in 2007.

On October 11, 2007, Arcana Heart was released on PlayStation 2 in Japan by AQ Interactive, featuring the option of playing characters in their "Original" or "Full" modes, reflecting the original and patched versions of characters from the arcade original, while voice acting was also added to all story segments. A drama CD was included as a pre-order bonus with the Japanese PS2 conversion. Japanese peripheral manufacturer Hori produced a limited edition Arcana Heart-themed arcade sticks following the launch of the PS2 version in Japan.

In January 2008, Atlus licensed a North American release of the PS2 port. Atlus initially planned to launch the PS2 version of Arcana Heart in North America on April 8 but was not released until April 10, 2008. A notable difference between the Japanese and North American PS2 releases is that the game has only Japanese voiceovers and no English voiceovers. Examu removed the voices present in the Japanese PS2 version's story mode as well as pre-battle and victory screens, but kept the voices used in battle. AQ Interactive later re-released the PS2 conversion in Japan as a budget title October 16, 2008.

=== Other media ===
On March 21, 2007, a soundtrack album titled Arcana Heart Heartful Sound Collection was co-published exclusively in Japan by Sony Music Entertainment Japan and TEAM Entertainment, featuring arranged songs by Yoshihira. An artbook and a guidebook were published by Enterbrain between March 29 and October 30, 2007, as part of their Arcadia Extra line of books. Prior to the launch of the PlayStation 2 conversion, a fan disc titled Arcana Heart Fan Disc was sold by Cabinet on August 17, 2007, at Comiket 72. The package included a DVD containing three audio dramas and interviews, and a CD containing three character songs and instrumental songs. Two audio dramas episodes titled Arcana Heart Drama CD Heartful Situation were also co-published by Sony Music Entertainment Japan and TEAM Entertainment between October 24 and November 21, 2007. A manga adaptation based on the game was serialized on the March 2008 issue of Comp Ace magazine, written and illustrated by Saimaru Bamyūda. Two manga were also serialized by Kadokawa Group Publishing between July 24, 2008, and March 21, 2009.

== Reception ==
Reception

Aggregate score
Aggregator	Score
Metacritic	77/100

Review scores
Publication	Score
Destructoid	8.0/10
GamesRadar+	3.5/5
GameZone	8.0/10
IGN	8.3/10
X-Play	4/5
Play	7.0/10

Arcana Heart on PlayStation 2 received "generally favorable" reviews, according to review aggregator site Metacritic. Destructoid's Dale North noted that the Arcana mechanic made it a bit different from most fighting games. North praised the hand-drawn presentation and character animations but stated that its complex fighting system "is not recommended for the type of gamer it seemed to be marketed to." GameZone's Louis Bedigian commended the gameplay, unique character roster and animations, easy-to-grasp skill level, and multiplayer but criticized the sound design for being below-average. GamesRadar+'s Mikel Reparaz gave positive remarks to the intuitive combo system reminiscent of Marvel vs. Capcom, simplicity, and hand-drawn graphics but criticized the lack of difficulty balance in the Arcade and Story modes.

IGN's Ryan Clements compared Arcana Heart with Guilty Gear due to stylistic similarities. Clements commended the responsive gameplay mechanics and slick character animations but criticized its high learning curve and complexity for newcomers, lack of additional content, music, and presentation. X-Play's D.F. Smith commended the character designs, fighting system, smooth 2D visuals, and English translation but criticized the lack of voice acting during story cutscenes in the North American version, stating that "it's probably not going to supplant the big hits of the genre, but it makes a fun change of pace from Street Fighter, Guilty Gear, and back to Street Fighter again and again." Play's Eric L. Patterson remarked that the game reminded him of Asuka 120% Limited Burning Fest for the Sega Saturn.
