= Hiromi Hirata =

Japanese voice actress

- 平田 宏美
- Born: February 19, 1978 (age 48); Hiroshima Prefecture, Japan
- Occupation: Voice actress
- Notable credit(s): Makoto Kikuchi in The Idolmaster; Mao in Disgaea 3
- Children: 2

Hiromi Hirata (平田 宏美, Hirata Hiromi; born February 19, 1978) is a Japanese voice actress represented by I'm Enterprise. She is best known for her role as Makoto Kikuchi in The Idolmaster game series. She was featured as a guest of honor at Anime Expo 2004. In video games, she voices Mao in Disgaea 3, Kamui Tokinomiya in Arcana Heart, and Miyabi in the Senran Kagura series.

== Filmography ==
=== Anime ===
Year	Series	Role	Notes	Source
1999	Black Heaven	Operator		
2001	Hajime no Ippo	Female fan		
2001	Shingu: Secret of the Stellar Wars	Female student		
2003	R.O.D the TV	Maggie Mui		
2005	Kamichu!	Bitoban no kami		
2005	Zoids: Genesis	Ruuji Familon		
2006	Kiba	Despara, Zed (child)		
2006	The Good Witch of the West	Roux Liskin		
2006	Himawari!	Mysterious Ninja		
2007	Venus Versus Virus	Riku Mikumo		
2007	Keroro Gunso	Gyororo		
2008	The Idolmaster: Live For You!	Makoto Kikuchi	OVA	
2009	Tatakau Shisho: The Book of Bantorra	Alme Norton		
2010	Asobi ni iku yo!	Maki Itokazu		
2010	Shukufuku no Campanella	Mise Altoise Montecchia		
2011	The Idolmaster	Makoto Kikuchi	TV series	
2013–14	Puchimas! Petit Idolmaster	Makochi	web series and OVAs	
2020	Boruto: Naruto Next Generations	Yubina		

=== Video games ===
Year	Series	Role	Notes	Source
2005–present	The Idolmaster series	Makoto Kikuchi		
2005	Realize: Panorama Luminary	Satoko Takeuchi		
2006	Arcana Heart	Kamui Tokinomiya		
2008–09	Arcana Heart 2	Kamui Tokinomiya	Also Suggoi	
2008	Disgaea 3: Absence of Justice	Mao	Also Return	
2009	Disgaea Infinite	Mao		
2009	Arcana Heart 3	Kamui Tokinomiya		
2011	Tales of Xillia	Isla		
2012	Tales of Xillia 2	Isla		
2012	Mugen Souls	Ryuto		
2012	Tsujidou-san no Jun'ai Road			
2013	Senran Kagura Shinovi Versus	Miyabi		
2014	Senran Kagura Bon Appétit	Miyabi	Background song performance: "Zetsubo no Machiavelli-rhythm" (The Machiavelli-rhythm of Despair)	
	Dragon Ball Xenoverse	Time Patroller (Male 1)		
2015	Senran Kagura: Estival Versus	Miyabi		
2024	Goddess of Victory: Nikke	Phantom		

== Discography ==
=== Albums ===
List of albums, with selected chart positions
Release Date	Title	Catalogue Number (Japan)	Oricon	
Release Date	Title	Catalogue Number (Japan)	Peak position	Weeks charted
2007-08-01	The Idolmaster Master Artist 04 Makoto Kikuchi	COCX-34390	21	3
2010-12-01	The Idolmaster Master Artist 2 -First Season- 04 Makoto Kikuchi	COCX-36513	23	2
2015-04-22	The Idolmaster Master Artist 3 03 Makoto Kikuchi	COCX-39143	6	6
