= Shukufuku no Campanella =

Japanese visual novel and anime series

- Shukufuku no Campanella game cover

祝福のカンパネラ (Shukufuku no Kanpanera)
- Genre: Drama, Fantasy, Romance, Harem
- Video game
- Developer: Windmill Oasis
- Publisher: Windmill (Windows); Kadokawa Shoten (PSP)
- Genre: Eroge, Visual novel
- Platform: Windows, PlayStation Portable
- Released: January 30, 2009 (Windows); September 30, 2010 (PSP)
- Manga
- Written by: Windmill Oasis
- Illustrated by: Hyūra Konata
- Published by: Kadokawa Shoten
- Magazine: Comptiq
- Original run: November 2008 – present
- Volumes: 2
- Manga

Shukufuku no Campanella: Balzare! Tortilla Sisters!
- Written by: Windmill Oasis
- Illustrated by: Kanaeda Couno
- Published by: Media Factory
- Magazine: Monthly Comic Alive
- Original run: December 2009 – present
- Anime television series
- Directed by: Shinji Ushiro
- Written by: Koujirou Nakamura; Saharu Amiyama
- Music by: Elements Garden
- Studio: AIC
- Licensed by: NA: Funimation Entertainment (Streaming) Nozomi Entertainment (Home Video)
- Original network: Tokyo MX
- Original run: July 2, 2010 – September 17, 2010
- Episodes: 12 + 1 OVA

Shukufuku no Campanella (祝福のカンパネラ, Shukufuku no Kanpanera; lit. "Blessing of the Campanella") is a Japanese visual novel developed by Windmill. It was first released as an eroge for Microsoft Windows on January 30, 2009, and followed by an all-ages release scheduled for the PlayStation Portable. The gameplay in Shukufuku no Campanella follows a linear plot line, which takes place in the fictional city of Ert'Aria, and offers predetermined scenarios with courses of interaction.

Shukufuku no Campanella has received several transitions to other media. There has been two manga adaptations: the first is serialized in the comic magazine Comptiq, and the second is serialized in Monthly Comic Alive. An anime adaptation was also produced by AIC, and began its Japanese broadcast on July 2, 2010. Two manga anthologies, five light novels, and two Internet radio shows have also been produced.

== Plot ==
=== Story ===
Ert'Aria, a port city known as the "treasury of the world" is preparing for a harvest festival. Leicester Maycraft, the young item engineer of the Oasis clan, follows a shooting star of eru, a mystical energy, to where it lands. There he discovers a young girl who calls him her father and their adventures begin.

=== Characters ===
==== Main characters ====
Leicester Maycraft (レスター・メイクラフト, Resutā Meikurafuto)
Voiced by: Nobuhiko Okamoto (anime)
He is the Oasis clan's best (only?) item engineer and Minette's "papa". He is a competent swordsman as well. He is shown to have a calm and patient personality, as he takes the hijinx of the girls around him in stride.

Minette (ミネット, Minetto)
Voiced by: Mitsu Anzu (PC), Mai Kadowaki (PSP, anime)
She is an automata puppet who was awoken by an eru meteor and immediately considered Leicester to be her papa, due to him being the first man she saw. She appears to be about 10 years old and has an innocent and caring personality. It is revealed that she was created by Mise Altoise.

Carina Verritti (カリーナ・ベルリッティ, Karīna Berurittī)
Voiced by: Riina Ruri (PC), Kimiko Koyama (PSP, anime)
Carina is the daughter of the rulers of the city and Leicester's childhood friend. She has a crush on him and is extremely jealous when he interacts with other girls. Carina is a mage and she uses a paddle-like staff, Montecchia, which Leicester created for her, to fly around town as she has a delicate constitution. She lives in a mansion near the sea and is part of Clan Oasis.

Chelsea Arcot (チェルシー・アーコット, Cherusī Ākotto)
Voiced by: Natsuki Miyagawa (PC), Asami Imai (PSP, anime)
Chelsea is one of the Holy Knights and a friend of Shelley's. She has a horrible sense of direction and is able to lose herself even if her destination is right in front of her. She joins Clan Oasis and over the course of their adventures, she develops feelings for Leicester.

Agnes Boulange (アニエス・ブーランジュ, Aniesu Būranju)
Voiced by: Kotomi Haruyama (PC), Kaori Mizuhashi (PSP, anime)
Agnes is a traveling puppeteer whose many automata puppets perform circus acts for the public. Agnes also has a huge appetite and she loves desserts. She is Mise Altoise's daughter and apprentice and is traveling the world to find her. She, like Chelsea, develops feelings for Leicester.

Nina Lindberg (ニナ・リンドベルイ, Nina Rindoberui)
Voiced by: Fūri Samoto (PC), Michiru Yuimoto (PSP, anime)
Nina is Clan Oasis' maid. She never goes on any quests herself but instead relays requests to the other members and takes care of the household. She is rarely seen outside of their home.

Nick La'juck (ニック・ラジャック, Nikku Rajakku)
Voiced by: Akira Kota (PC), Keiji Fujiwara (PSP, anime)
The only other male member of Clan Oasis, he is a close friend of Leicester's and carries a heavy two handed axe as his weapon of choice.

Salsa Tortilla (サルサ・トルティア, Sarusa Torutia)
Voiced by: Mia Naruse (PC), Ari Yunohara (PSP, anime)
The elder twin of the Tortilla sisters, Salsa is usually left taking the fall or blame for Ritos' actions. The twins are the main source of comic relief throughout the series. Salsa has feelings for Leicester and often fantasizes about him.

Ritos Tortilla (リトス・トルティア, Ritosu Torutia)
Voiced by: Oto Agumi (PC), Mai Gotō (PSP, anime)
Ritos is the younger of the Tortilla twins. Though she acts clueless most of the time, Ritos has a scheming personality and often withholds important information about her plans from her sister, until the last second. This inevitably leaves her sister, Salsa, to take the blame, fall for traps, or take an attack from an enemy, while she escapes just in time. She is aware of Salsa's feelings for Leicester and when speaking with or about Leicester, she makes heavy use of innuendo which sets her sister off and which Leicester is able to ignore, much to her amazement.

==== Supporting characters ====
Shelley Maycraft (シェリー・メイクラフト, Sherī Meikurafuto)
Voiced by: Himeno Miyabi (PC), Naoko Takano (PSP, anime)
Leicester's mother who looks younger than she is and acts very affectionately toward him - so much so, that she has been mistaken for his older sister. She has a tendency to tease her son and the girls around him.

Nagan Maycraft (ナーガン・メイクラフト, Nāgan Meikurafuto)
Voiced by: Haikikku Hidari (PC), Hiroki Yasumoto (PSP, anime)
He is Leicester's father and a friend of the puppeteer, Mise Altoise, who created of Minette.

Fabious Verritti (ファビウス・ベルリッティ, Fabiusu Berurittī)
Voiced by: Yudana Ii (PC), Hiroya Ishimaru (PSP, anime)
He is Carina's father and Archduke of Ert' Aria. He has a fondness for young girls for which Carina constantly berates him.

Fiore Verritti (フィオーレ・ベルリッティ, Fiōre Berurittī)
Voiced by: Haruka Kawai (PC), Satomi Kōrogi (PSP, anime)
She is Carina's mother who has a calm and regal presence.

Garnet (ガーネット, Gānetto)
Voiced by: Saki Nakano (PC), Akiko Hasegawa (PSP, anime)
She is a dragon's avatar, whom Leicester and the others encounter when they are asked to investigate a shadow dragon. After dealing with the shadow dragon she remains friendly with Clan Oasis. Like Chelsea, she has a terrible sense of direction; when asked to guide Chelsea, the two were not seen until nightfall.

Tango (タンゴ, Tango)
Voiced by: Haruka Kawai (PC), Satomi Kōrogi (PSP, anime)
Tango is a talking cat puppet that Agnes created and which participates in her shows. In contrast to her other puppets, Tango often acts as a sympathetic ear for Agnes.

Golem (ゴーレム, Gōremu)
Voiced by: Haikikku Hidari (PC), Hiroki Yasumoto (PSP, anime)
A Rock machine that Salsa built. Is it later revealed that Ritos installed Leicester's cheer up attitude in Golem to cheer the girl sup. (This was revealed when Golem cheers up Chelsea.) It also blushes when around Leicester.

Montecchia (モンテッキア, Montekkia)
Voiced by: unknown (PC), Hiromi Hirata (PSP, anime)
Carina's magic staff.

Miriam Roland (ミリアム, Miriamu Rōrando)
Voiced by: Miru (PC), Oma Ichimura (PSP, anime)
She is Minette's friend whom she meets in episode 5. Miriam is polite and shy and she relies on Minette to bring her stories of the outside world because her fragile body does not allow her to travel. It revealed that she is related to Aberdeen. Still later, it is revealed that she is an automata like Minette, but created by Roland to house the spirit of his sister - a hidden art within the Roland clan thought to be lost.

Aberdeen Roland (アバディーン・ローランド, Abadīn Rōrando)
Voiced by: Noriyuki (PC), Noriaki Sugiyama (PSP, anime)
He is a boy with white hair and a former colleague of Agnes. He is after Minette's core in order to save the automata he created for his sister, Miriam.

Avril (アヴリル, Avuriru)
Voiced by: Shino Kujo (PC), Yūko Gotō (PSP, anime)
A female automata who serves under Aberdeen. She does whatever her "master" tells her and is very strong - able block Nick's axe with just her bare hand. She also is able to move in incredible speeds with no effort and is excellent in manipulating the Eru (Ale) energy stored inside her body.

Mise Altoise (ミゼ・アルトワーズ, Mize Arutowāzu)
Voiced by: Tsukasa Nishikibe (PC), Hiromi Hirata (PSP, anime)
Agnes's "maitresse" (mentor) and mother. She has been missing for several years and neither her daughter nor her friends know where she is.

== Music ==
The game opening uses the same name as the title, "Shukufuku no Campanella" (祝福のカンパネラ), a duet by Hiromi Satou & NANA.

The anime series' first opening theme for the anime is "Shiawase wa Yori Tsuki Takaku" (シアワセは月より高く) by Aki Misato used from episodes two to seven, and nine to eleven; it was also the ending theme for episode twelve. The single was released on July 23, 2010. The second opening theme is "Yume no Preparation" (夢のpreparation, lit. "A Dream's Preparation") by Anri Yunohara, Mai Gotō, and Hiroki Yasumoto. The first ending theme for the anime is "Mirai Kaikisen" (未来回帰線) by Miyuki Hashimoto, used from episodes one to eight; it was also used as the opening for episode twelve. The single was released on August 23, 2010. The second ending theme is "AMELIA" by Yuko Gotō, used from episodes nine to eleven.

== Anime ==
Right Stuf Inc. has licensed the series for a DVD release in North America in 2014 under its Lucky Penny label.

=== Episode list ===
No.	Title	Original release date
1	"Night of the Meteor Shower" "Ryūseigun no Yoru" (流星群の夜)	July 2, 2010
The city of Ert' Aria is busy with preparations for the festival of the shooting stars, a meteor shower that happens only once every seven years. Carina Verritti arrives early at the house of Clan Oasis, hoping to rouse Leicester Maycroft from his bed, but Leicester is already awake, and must find a way to console her. The two head out to the market where they see a performance by the magician puppeteer Agnes Boulange. Agnes calls Carina out of the crowd to volunteer as her assistant during the performance; afterwards, she joins them for lunch. At the restaurant, all three notice a striking young women marching with the Holy Knights who is later revealed to be Chelsea Arcot, an acquaintance of Leicester's mother, Shelly. Both Agnes and Chelsea agree to join Clan Oasis at the viewing party on the cathedral roof. En route to the cathedral, the party runs into Ritos and Salsa Tortilla, who publicly argue over which will be Leicester's bride, but decline to join the party, claiming to know of a better "higher" viewing spot. Carina and company finally make it to the roof, where they watch the falling meteors. One appears to be heading directly towards them and harmlessly strikes one of the spires. Leicester chases after it, but finds a girl (Minette) lying in bed, who awakens and calls him Papa.
2	"The World of Dragons" "Ryū no Sekai" (竜の世界)	July 9, 2010
The clan accepts a quest from Carina's father, Grand Duke Fabious. Fabious has detected a dangerously strong concentration of El, the magical substance that brought Minette to life, in his treasure chamber, and wants Oasis to remove it. In the treasure chamber, Chelsea senses the El behind a locked door said to lead to the realm of dragons. Carina uses her magic to unlock the door and the group passes through to a forest where they are immediately attacked by a crystal monster in the form of a dragon. No one, including Ritos and Salsa, who try to steal a march on the group, is able to defeat the monster until Minette, who came along despite Leicester's objections, captures its magic by means of the anima perla. A real dragon in the form of a girl who calls herself Garnet appears and gives Minette a glowing red and yellow sphere in thanks. The episode ends at the beach, where Leicester must think quickly to avoid offending any of the girls when asked to choose which has the prettiest swimsuit.
3	"The Staff of Bonds" "Kizuna no Tsue" (絆の杖)	July 16, 2010
Arriving at Oasis house, Carina is taken aback at the sight of Leicester and Agnes engaged in deep conversation. Leicester deflects her inquiry by changing the topic to light-absorbing rainbow flowers, and convinces the clan to undertake a quest in search of some. The group quickly becomes separated in the woods, with Leicester and Carina flying ahead on her staff. Ritos and Salsa intrude once again, but accomplish little. Before the rest of the group can catch up with them, Leicester and Carina battle and defeat a crystal monster hiding in the darkness of the rainbow flowers. Carina flies up to retrieve a crystal left in the tree branches and plummets towards earth when her staff suddenly runs out of power. Leicester attempts to break her fall, but the two become entangled in vines and must remain in an indecent position until rescued by the rest of the group. Back in town, Leicester reveals to Carina that he was consulting with Agnes over how to give Carina's staff the ability to talk, and was told that El must be bonded with strong emotional bonds. Carina and Leicester work through the night attempting to accomplish this, and eventually succeed in creating an outspoken talking staff.
4	"Within the Darkness" "Yami no Naka" (闇の中)	July 23, 2010
Agnes strikes out on her own, but after encountering an old favorite patron, returns to enlist the clan in a hunt for bath crystals. Ritos and Salsa hear of the quest, but misunderstanding, assume that the group is making a trip to an onsen. Leicester, Nick, and the girls enter an abandoned mine to search for bath crystals. They find quite a few, and after breaking for lunch, Agnes and Leicester scout on ahead, discovering a mysterious shrine built around a large crystal. Everyone enjoys bathing in the light of the crystal, but an earthquake sends them scurrying for the exits. A rockfall isolates Agnes and Leicester from the rest of the group, forcing them to find their own way out. The clan reunites outside the mine and celebrate their success by giving Ritos and Salsa some of their extra bath crystals. At home, Shelly pulls a prank on Leicester by sending the girls to the bath before he is finished. Agnes and Leicester end up hiding naked in a corner, hoping not to be discovered by the other girls.
5	"Day Off for Oasis" "Oasis no Kyūjitsu" (Oasisの休日)	July 30, 2010
Minette goes shopping, makes a friend, rescues a cat, and loses her skirt. Ritos and Salsa supervise from behind the scenes. Leicester comes to the rescue. Chelsea and Garnet get lost.
6	"Night of the Party" "Pātī no Yoru" (パーティーの夜)	August 6, 2010
Shadowed by Minette, Leicester admires Chelsea sparring after making a delivery. He invites her to a party hosted by Fabious in honor of the Holy Knights. The girls try on party dresses. Nick and Leicester replace the knights guarding artifacts in the cathedral, and the Tortilla sisters provide security for the party. A crystal monster attacks the party and is defeated by Leicester and Chelsea as the adults gossip upstairs. They are particularly concerned about the increasing concentrations of El and the corresponding rise in the number of crystal monsters. In the end, Chelsea drinks too much and has to be carried home and put to bed by Leicester.
7	"The Forest of Dolls" "Ningyō no Mori" (人形の森)	August 13, 2010
Oasis is hired to investigate the preponderance of El. Why do meteors continue to fall long after the shower was supposed to have ended? In search of answers, they travel to the workshop of Mise Altoise, the builder of Minette and Agnes's teacher. Despite signs of her recent presence, Altworth is nowhere to be found. After considerable sleuthing, Oasis finds a letter addressed to Agnes from Altworth that says she has gone in search of an artifact. They have no time to reflect on the meaning of this, as the group is immediately attacked by a mysterious duo trying to take Minette's core. Agnes recognizes Avril and her own older brother Aberdeen, but they vanish before she can call them to account. Ritos and Salsa make a cameo.
8	"The Eighth Episode! Everyone Gets Together!" "8 Wa Dayo! Zen'in Shūgō!" (8 話だよ！全員集合！)	August 20, 2010
Ritos and Salsa are hired to protect Minette while preparations are made for the Harvest Festival. Their "protection" includes convincing Minette to promote the Tortilla Company in a bikini. Ritos plays multiple tricks on Salsa throughout the episode, but her scheme to set up her sister with Leicester falls through when Salsa refuses to be separated from her twin.
9	"An Unusual Omen" "Ihen no Yochō" (異変の予兆)	August 27, 2010
Oasis continues to investigate. Miriam collapses while playing with Minette. Garnet, knowing her for an automaton who is no longer human, sends Agnes to help. Agnes says that Miriam will die if she cannot get a new core, and that the only suitable replacement is Minette's anima perla. Aberdeen storms the bedroom where his sister Miriam is resting, only to be confronted by Leicester and company.
10	"Minette's Choice" "Minetto no Sentaku" (ミネットの選択)	September 3, 2010
Aberdeen takes Miriam back, but not before she protests that Minette should not be sacrificed for her sake. As Miriam fades, Minette lives life to the fullest. That night, Minette runs away from home after bidding Leicester good night. Shelly catches up with her on the cathedral roof, and lets Minette cry in her arms but does not stop her. The episode ends as Leicester notices that Minette is gone and rushes out in search of her.
11	"Everyone's Feelings" "Sorezore no Omoi" (それぞれの思い)	September 10, 2010
Aberdeen brings Minette to Miriam's bedside and gets ready to transfer the core, but Carina magically locates them before he can finish. Carina battles Avril while Leicester fights Aberdeen. Avril and Aberdeen possess mighty battle artifacts and cannot be defeated, but Leicester and Carina are also strong. A particularly large flash draws Minette out from the house: when she sees Leicester and Aberdeen fighting, she interposes herself. Miriam follows and begs everyone to work together and find a way for both of them to live. Leicester and Aberdeen agree to do so, but Garnet suddenly appears calling everyone back to town. The unregulated flow of El is reaching a crisis point and everyone must work together to save the world.
12	"Blessing of the Campanella" "Shukufuku no Kanpanera" (祝福のカンパネラ)	September 17, 2010
Leicester and company go off to fix the unregulated El. Ritos and Salsa guard the home front, Avril and Aberdeen fight a rearguard action, Nick and Garnet keep the stairs clear, Carina, Chelsea and Agnes watch Leicester's back. Altworth releases the artifact, ending the creation of crystal monsters but exposing Leicester to its full flow. With Minette's help, the artifact is restored. Nina prepares for a party.
Specials	"Shukufuku no Campanella: Isshoni Bath Time"	September 22, 2010 to February 24, 2011
A series of 6 specials (each 2 minutes long) called "Isshoni Bath Time" were included with the Blu-ray release of the anime after the TV series concluded but before the OVA.
OVA	"Shukufuku no Campanella OVA"	March 30, 2011
A series of short skits featuring the characters in various states of undress.
