= Team Arcana =

Japanese video game developer

- Native name: チームアルカナ
- Type: Kabushiki gaisha Subsidiary
- Industry: Video games
- Predecessor: Examu
- Founded: February 16, 2019; 7 years ago
- Headquarters: Tokyo, Japan
- Key people: Koji Takaya; (Studio Manager); Motoharu Yoshihira; (Sound and Music Composer)
- Products: Arcana Heart series Daemon Bride series
- Number of employees: 35 (2023)

Team Arcana is a Japanese video game developer and a successor of Examu, which mostly produce fighting games for arcades and home consoles. It is known for developing the Arcana Heart series, the company's namesake, as well as Daemon Bride series. Team Arcana's existence as a re-branded successor of Examu had been dated back to Arcana Heart series' crossover inclusion in BlazBlue: Cross Tag Battle.

== History ==
On 11 February 2020, its predecessor, Examu suspended its business operations. Any ongoing development works and product supports have migrated to Team Arcana.

== Games ==
Game	Release date	System	Publisher(s)	JP	NA	EU
Million Arthur: Arcana Blood	November 29, 2018	PlayStation 4	Square Enix	Yes	No	No
Million Arthur: Arcana Blood	June 20, 2019	Microsoft Windows	Square Enix	Yes	Yes	Yes
Arcana Heart 3: Love Max Six Stars Xtend!!!!!	April 30, 2021	Microsoft Windows	Arc System Works	Yes	Yes	Yes
Arcana Heart 3: Love Max Six Stars Xtend!!!!!	December 15, 2023	Arcade	exA-Arcadia	Yes	Yes	Yes
Daemon Bride exAGAIN	2024	Arcade	exA-Arcadia	Yes	Yes	Yes
Aquapazza: Aquaplus Dream Match	2025	Microsoft Windows	DMM.com; Shiravune	Yes	Yes	Yes
Daemon Bride: Additional Gain	2025	Microsoft Windows	Team Arcana; Kizawaya	Yes	Yes	Yes
