= Apron of Magic =

2010 collectible card cooking video game

- European 3DS box art
- Developer: Examu
- Publisher: Examu (Note: iOS port published by VERVE.) (Note: 3DS port published by Examu in Japan, Rising Star Games and Bergsala in Europe, and by Bergsala-Lightweight in America and Australia.)
- Series: Hello Kitty; Jewelpet; Arcana Heart
- Platforms: Arcade iOS; Nintendo 3DS
- Release: Arcade: JP: July 26, 2010; AS: 2010; iOS: JP: June 13, 2012; Nintendo 3DS: JP: December 12, 2013; PAL: November 6, 2015; NA: January 28, 2016
- Genres: Digital collectible card game, cooking
- Mode: Single-player
- Arcade system: eX-BOARD

Apron of Magic (まほうのエプロン, Mahō no epuron) is an arcade collectible card cooking game developed and published by Examu. The game was created to commemorate the 50th anniversary of Sanrio and features various characters from the Sanrio Company, including ones from the anime series. The game was released in Japan on July 26, 2010, and has been through several revisions during its release period. Starting with the revision in 2012, the game is tied to both the Jewelpet and Arcana Heart franchises.

An iOS version was released on June 13, 2012, featuring six playable characters. Another port of the game titled Hello Kitty & Apron of Magic: Rhythm Cooking (ハローキティとまほうのエプロン リズムクッキング♪, Harōkiti to ma hō no epuron rizumukukkingu ♪) was also released on the Nintendo 3DS on December 12, 2013. The game was released in Europe on November 6, 2015, as Hello Kitty and the Apron of Magic Rhythm Cooking, and in North America on January 28, 2016, as Hello Kitty's Magic Apron.

== Gameplay ==
Apron of Magic involves using special collectible cards, which need to be scanned into the arcade machine. Gameplay is performed using the touchscreen. The cards must be scanned in the following order: the character card (Red), the ingredient card (Yellow), and finally the Magic Power card (Blue). However, there is a time limit, and players may scan as many cards as they can within it. The player then needs to follow some steps in the game to make sure the food has been prepared and cooked well in the process. Presentation and tasting were done in the end. If the player fails in one of those steps, the dish the player will cook will not end well.

== Characters ==
In commemoration of the 50th anniversary of the company, Sanrio included several characters, which gets expanded later on in each revision. More characters are also added in each revision, making it have the highest number of Sanrio characters that ever debuted in the game. Heart Aino and Saki Tsuzura, characters from EXAMU's fighting game Arcana Heart, also appear in the game as playable cameo characters.
