= Million Arthur =

Japanese video game franchise

ミリオン アーサー (Mirion Āsā)
- Created by: Square Enix
- Video game

Kaku-San-Sei Million Arthur
- Developer: Square Enix
- Publisher: Square Enix; Gamevil
- Platform: Android, iOS, PlayStation Vita
- Released: JP: April 9, 2012; WW: July 14, 2015
- Manga

Jaku-San-Sei Million Arthur
- Written by: Choboraunyopomi
- Published by: Square Enix
- Magazine: Gangan Comics
- Original run: 2012 – 2019
- Video game

Kai-Ri-Sei Million Arthur
- Developer: Square Enix
- Publisher: Square Enix
- Platform: Android, iOS, PlayStation Vita
- Released: JP: November 19, 2014
- Original net animation

Jaku-San-Sei Million Arthur
- Directed by: Mankyū
- Produced by: Hiroaki Iwano
- Music by: Yasuhiro Misawa
- Studio: Gathering
- Released: November 20, 2015 – November 14, 2019
- Runtime: 3 minutes
- Episodes: 90
- Video game

Kai-Ri-Sei Million Arthur VR
- Developer: Square Enix
- Publisher: Square Enix
- Platform: PlayStation VR
- Released: JP: May 25, 2017
- Video game

Million Arthur: Arcana Blood
- Developer: Team Arcana
- Publisher: Square Enix
- Music by: Yoko Shimomura
- Platform: Arcade; PlayStation 4; Windows
- Released: Arcade; JP: November 21, 2017; PlayStation 4; JP: November 29, 2018; Windows; WW: June 20, 2019
- Video game

Han-Gyaku-Sei Million Arthur
- Developer: Square Enix; NetEase; Nexon
- Publisher: JP: Square Enix; PRC: NetEase
- Platform: Android, iOS
- Released: PRC: March 30, 2018; JP: November 29, 2018
- Video game

Kou-Kyou-Sei Million Arthur
- Developer: Square Enix
- Publisher: Square Enix
- Platform: Android, iOS
- Released: JP: October 4, 2018
- Anime
- Million Arthur

Million Arthur (ミリオン アーサー, Mirion Āsā) is a Japanese media franchise created by Square Enix, consisting primarily of a series of video games. The first release was an online free-to-play card battle game titled Kaku-San-Sei Million Arthur (拡散性ミリオンアーサー, Kakusansei Mirion Āsā; lit. Diffusion Million Arthur), which was released for iOS and Android in 2012. A sequel game titled Kai-Ri-Sei Million Arthur (乖離性ミリオンアーサー, Kairisei Mirion Āsā) was released in Japan in November 2014.

An MMORPG titled Han-Gyaku-Sei Million Arthur (叛逆性ミリオンアーサー) was released in 2018. The TV anime adaptation of the game Operation Han-Gyaku-Sei Million Arthur premiered on October 25, 2018. The TV anime series is licensed in North America by Funimation.

== Franchise ==
=== Games ===
==== Series titles ====
The first game, an online free-to-play card battle game titled Kaku-San-Sei Million Arthur (拡散性ミリオンアーサー, Kakusansei Mirion Āsā) was released in 2012, written by Kazuma Kamachi. The title was ported to the Nintendo 3DS in October 2014 with a new interface to match the system's two screens. An English language version of the game was released for Southeast Asia entitled Magnificent Million Arthur. It was also ported to the PlayStation Vita with additional features including voice acting, gameplay changes and the ability of a player to edit their deck. Square Enix closed the game's Japanese servers in 2015. On July 14, 2015 it was released in Europe and North America by the South Korean publisher Gamevil. Servers for this release were closed on December 7 of that same year.

A sequel game titled Kai-Ri-Sei Million Arthur (乖離性ミリオンアーサー, Kairisei Mirion Āsā) was released in Japan in November 2014. The service ended on September 30, 2020.

A virtual reality game titled Kai-Ri-Sei Million Arthur VR (乖離性ミリオンアーサー VR, Kairisei Mirion Āsā VR) was shown at the Tokyo Game Show in September 2016. It was released in Japan on May 25, 2017, for the PC via Steam, requiring an HTC Vive headset to play. A PlayStation VR version was released in Japan on September 28, 2017. Released in English-speaking countries as Million Arthur VR: Character Command RPG, the PC version was released by Vive Studios in the United States and the Commonwealth nations (inc. the United Kingdom, Canada, Thailand, India, Australia and New Zealand) on October 12, 2017.

An arcade game called Million Arthur: Arcana Blood was developed by Arcana Heart's developer Team Arcana, originally owned by Examu and released in Japan on November 21, 2017. A PlayStation 4 port was released on November 29, 2018, and was originally planned only for release in Japan. The game was later ported to PC and released worldwide on June 20, 2019. The plot revolves around many Arthurs armed with Excaliber blades fighting to become the true king. The roster of fighters features thirteen characters including faeries, clones, and guest fighters from other titles such as King of Fighters XIV and Trials of Mana. During combat, players can have three supporting fighters at a time from a selection of thirty one.

An MMORPG titled Han-Gyaku-Sei Million Arthur (叛逆性ミリオンアーサー) was released in China for iOS and Android in March 2018 and released in Japan in November 2018. The MMO was terminated on September 30, 2019.

An action role-playing game titled Kou-Kyou-Sei Million Arthur (交響性ミリオンアーサー, Kōkyōsei Mirion Āsā) was released for iOS and Android in Japan during October 2018. Players create characters who explore 3D terrains, fight monsters, and perform special attacks with other characters within a players party. The mobile service shut down on May 12, 2020.

In 2021, Perfect World Games developed a licensed sequel codenamed "MA", it was officially unveiled as Kai-Ri-Sei Million Arthur: Ring in 2023.

==== Character crossovers ====
Million Arthur appeared in the 2015 role-playing game Megadimension Neptunia VII as a DLC character, but the character was removed from the Steam version of the game in January 2020. Thief (Tōzoku) Arthur appears as a guest DLC character in SNK Heroines: Tag Team Frenzy. Gestalt Odin featured six characters from the series as guest fighters. Characters from others games have also appeared in the Million Arthur series, such as Iori Yagami from The King of Fighters series, who is both under his Miss X disguise and also a DLC in Heroines, appears as a guest character in Arcana Blood.

=== Live-action television ===
A live-action television adaptation premiered on October 3, 2014.

=== Manga ===
A 4-panel manga adaptation by Choboraunyopomi, titled Jaku-San-Sei Million Arthur (弱酸性ミリオンアーサー), has been serialized within the Million Arthur games and via the Niconico Seiga website since 2012.

=== Anime ===
An ONA adaptation of the Jaku-San-Sei Million Arthur manga premiered on November 20, 2015.

An anime television series adaptation of the Han-Gyaku-Sei Million Arthur MMORPG by J.C.Staff premiered on October 25, 2018, on Tokyo MX and other channels. It was announced that the series will be split-cour, with the second season airing in April 2019. The series is directed by Yōhei Suzuki and written by Tsuyoshi Tamai. Yoshinari Saito provides the character designs. The series' music is composed by Go Shiina and produced by Lantis. Genco is producing the series. The opening theme song is "Highlight" by Ayaka Ōhashi, and the ending theme song is "KI-te MI-te HIT PARADE!" by Himika Akaneya, Rie Takahashi, Nao Tōyama, Yu Serizawa, Suzuko Mimori, and Rina Hidaka under their character names. The second opening theme song is "Open the Worlds" by ORESAMA, and the second ending theme song is "Pearly×Party" by the voice actress unit Pearly Fairy.

A short lived trading card game titled "Million Arthur TCG" was released in June 2016. There were a total of 4 starter decks (MAST-001 through MAST-004) and 1 Booster set.

=== Merchandise ===
Square Enix announced that in mid-2021 they would be offering NFT's of comics and stickers from the Million Arthur series.

== Common elements ==
The series is based around Arthurian legends and the blade Excalibur. Demons invade Britain, and while the countries eleven leaders quarrel, the protagonist Arthur draws the sword, becomes king of the dragons, and leads the countries defenses against the invaders. Other games take place in the fictional land of Camelot. Kou-Kyou-Sei Million Arthur takes place in Camelot's future, where evil has conquered the land and a girl named Merlin gathers new "Arthur's" to retake the kingdom.

== Development and history ==
The original game was written by Kazuma Kamachi, creator of A Certain Magical Index, and over fifty illustrators created 170 playing cards for the title.

== Reception ==
Western reviews were generally unfavorable for the original Million Arthur, with Touch Arcade praising the story and dialogue but criticizing the passive and boring gameplay. Gamezebo applauded the art direction and the games unique premise but also criticized the battle system and the Japanese-only voiceover.
