= Examu =

Japanese video game company

EXAMU Inc.
- Type: Kabushiki gaisha Subsidiary
- Industry: Video games
- Founded: March 2, 1999
- Defunct: Late February, 2020
- Fate: Rebranded as Team Arcana
- Successor: Team Arcana
- Headquarters: Tokyo, Japan
- Products: Fighting games
- Total assets: ¥160 million
- Number of employees: 30
- Website: examu.co.jp

Examu was a Japanese video game company founded in 2000 by ex-staff members from Yuki Enterprises. It mostly produced fighting games for arcades and home consoles and was the developer of the fighting game series Arcana Heart. Initially, they developed games for their own arcade system board called eX-Board, to release their games mostly on Taito's NESiCAxLive arcade delivery system. Support for eX-Board ceased in December, 2013. At the end of February 2020, Examu suspended their business operations. Any ongoing development works and product supports (most particularly ongoing supported fighting games (including licensed fighting games)) has since migrated to its rebranded successor since 2019, Team Arcana.

== Games ==
=== Arcade games ===
Game	Year	Hardware	Publisher(s)
Arcana Heart Full!	April 17, 2007	Nexus 3D	Examu
Arcana Heart 2	March 21, 2008	eX-Board	Examu
Suggoi! Arcana Heart 2: Tenkousei Akane to Nazuna	October 30, 2008	eX-Board	Examu
Daemon Bride	July 16, 2009	eX-Board	Examu
Arcana Heart 3	September 20, 2010	eX-Board	Examu
Aquapazza: Aquaplus Dream Match	July 22, 2011	NESiCAxLive	Aquaplus
Daemon Bride: Additional Gain	November 24, 2011	NESiCAxLive	Examu
Arcana Heart 3: Love Max!!!!!!	May 8, 2013	NESiCAxLive	Examu
Arcana Heart 3: Love Max Six Stars!!!!!!	December 4, 2014	NESiCAxLive	Examu
Nitroplus Blasterz: Heroines Infinite Duel	April 30, 2015	NESiCAxLive	Nitroplus
Million Arthur: Arcana Blood	November 21, 2017	NESiCAxLive2	Square Enix

=== Console games ===
Game	Release date	System	Publisher(s)	JP	NA	EU
Arcana Heart	October 11, 2007	PlayStation 2	AQ Interactive (JP)	Yes	Yes	No
Arcana Heart	April 10, 2008	PlayStation 2	Atlus (NA)	Yes	Yes	No
Arcana Heart 2	April 9, 2009	PlayStation 2	AQ Interactive	Yes	No	No
Arcana Heart 3	January 12, 2012	PlayStation 3 Xbox 360	Arc System Works (JP)	Yes	Yes	Yes
Arcana Heart 3	April 8, 2012	PlayStation 3 Xbox 360	Aksys Games (NA)^{a}	Yes	Yes	Yes
Arcana Heart 3	August 24, 2012	PlayStation 3 Xbox 360	PQube (EU)	Yes	Yes	Yes
Aquapazza: Aquaplus Dream Match	August 30, 2012	PlayStation 3	Aquaplus (JP)	Yes	Yes	No
Aquapazza: Aquaplus Dream Match	November 19, 2013	PlayStation 3	Atlus (NA)	Yes	Yes	No
Hello Kitty and the Apron of Magic	December 12, 2013	Nintendo 3DS	Examu (JP)	Yes	Yes	Yes
Hello Kitty and the Apron of Magic	June 11, 2015	Nintendo 3DS	Bergsala Lightweight (EU)^{b}	Yes	Yes	Yes
Hello Kitty and the Apron of Magic	January 26, 2016	Nintendo 3DS	Bergsala Lightweight (NA)^{b}	Yes	Yes	Yes
Arcana Heart 3: Love Max!!!!!	May 29, 2014	PlayStation 3 PlayStation Vita; Windows	Arc System Works (JP)	Yes	Yes	Yes
Arcana Heart 3: Love Max!!!!!	September 23, 2014	PlayStation 3 PlayStation Vita; Windows	Aksys Games (NA)	Yes	Yes	Yes
Arcana Heart 3: Love Max!!!!!	November 20, 2014	PlayStation 3 PlayStation Vita; Windows	NIS America (EU)	Yes	Yes	Yes
Nitroplus Blasterz: Heroines Infinite Duel	April 30, 2015	PlayStation 3 PlayStation 4 Windows	Marvelous Entertainment (JP)	Yes	Yes	Yes
Nitroplus Blasterz: Heroines Infinite Duel	February 2, 2016	PlayStation 3 PlayStation 4 Windows	XSEED Games (NA)^{a}	Yes	Yes	Yes
Nitroplus Blasterz: Heroines Infinite Duel	April 7, 2016	PlayStation 3 PlayStation 4 Windows	Marvelous Entertainment (EU)^{c}	Yes	Yes	Yes
Arcana Heart 3: Love Max Six Stars!!!!!	December 12, 2017	Microsoft Windows	Arc System Works	Yes	Yes	Yes
Million Arthur: Arcana Blood	November 29, 2018	PlayStation 4	Square Enix	Yes	No	No
Million Arthur: Arcana Blood	June 20, 2019	Microsoft Windows	Square Enix	Yes	Yes	Yes

Notes

^aPlayStation 3 version is digital-only.
^beShop release only.
^cPlayStation 4 version only.
