= Noriyuki =

- Gender: Male

Origin
- Origin: Japanese
- Meaning: Different meanings depending on the kanji used

Noriyuki (written: 紀之, 紀行, 敬之, 記之, 徳行, 憲幸, 範之 or 範幸) is a masculine Japanese given name. Notable people with the name include:

- Noriyuki Abe (阿部 記之; born 1961), Japanese anime director
- Noriyuki Asakura (朝倉 紀行; born 1954), Japanese musician
- Noriyuki Haga (芳賀 紀行; born 1975), Japanese motorcycle racer
- Noriyuki Higashiyama (東山 紀之; born 1966), Japanese singer and actor
- Hōmashō Noriyuki (豊真将 紀行; born 1981), Japanese sumo wrestler
- Noriyuki Iwadare (岩垂 徳行; born 1964), Japanese video game composer
- Noriyuki Kanzaki (神崎 範之; born 1982), Japanese figure skater
- Noriyuki Makihara (槇原 敬之; born 1969), Japanese singer-songwriter
- Noriyuki Sakemoto (酒本 憲幸; born 1984), Japanese footballer
- Noriyuki Sato (佐藤 範幸; born 1953), Japanese fencer
- Noriyuki Sugasawa (菅澤 紀行; born 1987), Japanese basketball player
- Noriyuki "Pat" Morita (1932–2005), American actor
