= Ryota Inoue =

Japanese footballer

Personal information
- Date of birth: April 26, 1990 (age 36)
- Place of birth: Tokyo, Japan
- Height: 1.81 m (5 ft 11 1/2 in)
- Position: Goalkeeper

Youth career
- Buddy SC
- –2008: FC Tokyo

College career
Years	Team	Apps	(Gls)
2009–2012	NIFS Kanoya		

Senior career*
Years	Team	Apps	(Gls)
2013–2019	Gainare Tottori	33	(0)
2020–2022	Kagura Shimane	63	(0)
- * Club domestic league appearances and goals

Ryota Inoue (井上 亮太, Inoue Ryōta; born April 26, 1990) is a Japanese former football player.

== Career ==
Ryota Inoue joined the J2 League club Gainare Tottori in 2013.
