= Arcana Heart 3 =

2009 video game

- European cover art
- Developer: Examu
- Publishers: JP: Examu (arcade) Arc System Works (console); NA: Aksys Games; EU: PQube
- Director: Kazuma Hayashi
- Producer: Koji Takaya
- Artist: Hirotaka Akaga
- Writer: Tohru Sakurai
- Composer: Motoharu Yoshihira
- Series: Arcana Heart
- Platforms: Arcade, PlayStation 3, Xbox 360
- Release: Arcade: JP: December 22, 2009; PlayStation 3, Xbox 360: JP: January 13, 2011; EU: August 19, 2011; PlayStation 3: NA: April 19, 2011
- Genre: Fighting
- Modes: Single-player, multiplayer
- Arcade system: eX-Board

Arcana Heart 3 (Note: Japanese: アルカナハート3, Hepburn: Arukana Hāto Surī) is a 2009 fighting game developed by Examu. It is the third game in the Arcana Heart series and a sequel to Arcana Heart 2. Players choose both a fighter and an Arcana, a spirit that modifies the fighter's abilities and supplies additional attacks.

Examu released the game in Japanese arcades on December 22, 2009. Arc System Works published PlayStation 3 and Xbox 360 versions in Japan in January 2011. Aksys Games released the PlayStation 3 version in North America through PlayStation Network on April 19, 2011, and PQube released both console versions in Europe on August 19.

The arcade revision Arcana Heart 3: Love Max!!!!! (Note: Japanese: アルカナハート3 LOVE MAX!!!!!, Hepburn: Arukana Hāto Surī Love Max!!!!!) followed in May 2013, adding balance changes and game modes. It was later ported to PlayStation 3, PlayStation Vita, and Microsoft Windows. A second revision, Arcana Heart 3: Love Max Six Stars!!!!!! (Note: Japanese: アルカナハート3 LOVE MAX SIX STARS!!!!!!, Hepburn: Arukana Hāto Surī Love Max Six Stars!!!!!!), debuted in arcades in December 2014 and on Windows in December 2017.

The Windows update Arcana Heart 3: Love Max Six Stars!!!!!! Xtend (Note: Japanese: アルカナハート3 LOVE MAX SIX STARS!!!!!! XTEND, Hepburn: Arukana Hāto Surī Love Max Six Stars!!!!!! Xtend) was released in April 2021. An enhanced arcade version, shortened to Arcana Heart 3 Xtend, was released worldwide for exA-Arcadia hardware in December 2023.

== Gameplay ==
Arcade version screenshot showcasing a match between Eko and Maori Kasuga.

Arcana Heart 3 is a two-dimensional fighting game. After choosing a fighter, the player selects an Arcana, a spirit associated with a tarot archetype. Each Arcana changes the fighter's attributes and grants a distinct set of special moves, allowing different combinations of characters and abilities.

Combat uses three attack buttons, an Arcana button, and a homing button. The homing mechanic lets fighters rapidly pursue opponents and cancel attacks into aerial movement. Arcana and Force gauges govern defensive techniques, powerful attacks, and Extend Force, a temporary enhanced state. A simplified control option assigns major functions to individual buttons. The console versions add a fully voiced story mode, training and score-attack modes, and online multiplayer.

== Synopsis ==
Arcana Heart 3 is set in a fantastical version of Japan two months after the "Great Kanto Incident" depicted in Arcana Heart 2. Although reconstruction has begun, the disaster has weakened the international organizations that monitor elemental phenomena and protect the country.

When dimensional distortions begin appearing across Japan, the Drexler Institute—an organization that creates artificial Arcana—emerges from hiding. Drexler intends to use its influence over Japan's elemental authorities to sink the country within six days. The playable "Maidens", young women able to communicate with Arcana, investigate the distortions and attempt to prevent the plan.

== Characters ==
The original release has 23 playable characters: 20 returning from the first two games and three newcomers—Weiß (ヴァイス, Vaisu), Eko (えこ, Eko), and Scharlachrot (シャルラッハロート, Sharurahharōto). Each newcomer is paired with a new Arcana. Ragnarok, a giant artificial Arcana created by the Drexler Institute, serves as the final boss.

Love Max Six Stars!!!!!! adds Minori Amanohara (天之原みのり, Amanohara Minori), bringing the playable roster to 24. The Kickstarter campaign for the Windows version funded two further characters, Pistrix (ピストリクス, Pisutorikusu) and Dark Heart (ダークハート, Dāku Hāto), who were added in Xtend. The 2023 arcade edition contains 26 playable characters and 25 selectable Arcana.

== Release ==
Arcana Heart 3 Love Max!!!!!

Arcana Heart 3 Love Max!!!!!
- Developer: Examu
- Publishers: JP: Arc System Works; NA: Aksys Games; EU: NIS America; WW: Arc System Works (Windows)
- Platforms: Arcade, PlayStation 3, PlayStation Vita, Microsoft Windows
- Release: Arcade: JP: May 8, 2013; PlayStation 3, PlayStation Vita: JP: May 29, 2014; NA: September 23, 2014; EU: November 20, 2014; Microsoft Windows: WW: September 29, 2015
- Mode: Multiplayer; single-player
- Arcade system: Taito Type X2

Love Max!!!!! rebalanced the game and brought the survival and training modes from the console versions to arcades. It was released in Japanese arcades on May 8, 2013. Arc System Works released PlayStation 3 and PlayStation Vita ports in Japan on May 29, 2014. Aksys Games released the ports in North America that September, followed by NIS America in Europe in November. The Windows version was released worldwide on September 29, 2015.

Arcana Heart 3 Love Max Six Stars!!!!!!

Love Max Six Stars!!!!!! was released in Japanese arcades on December 4, 2014. It includes further balance changes and adds Minori Amanohara as a playable character. Following a successful Kickstarter campaign, the Windows version was released worldwide on December 12, 2017.

Arcana Heart 3 Love Max Six Stars !!!!!! Xtend

Love Max Six Stars!!!!!! Xtend was released as a Windows update on April 29, 2021. It incorporates additional balance changes and adds Pistrix and Dark Heart, characters funded through the earlier Kickstarter campaign.

ExA-Arcadia developed and published an enhanced arcade edition titled Arcana Heart 3 Xtend. Released worldwide on December 15, 2023, it features revised graphics, two-frame input latency, new story material, and support for English and Japanese.

== Reception ==
Reception

Aggregate score
Aggregator	Score
Metacritic	73/100

Review score
Publication	Score
GameSpot	7/10

Famitsu scored both Japanese console versions 27 out of 40. GameSpot's Heidi Kemps gave the game 7 out of 10. She praised the homing system, the range of character-and-Arcana combinations, and the online play, while criticizing its limited single-player appeal and aspects of its presentation.

By March 2011, more than 50,000 copies of the console versions had been shipped.

Love Max!!!!! received a Famitsu score of 28 out of 40 on both PlayStation 3 and Vita. Marcus Estrada of Hardcore Gamer gave the Vita version 4 out of 5, commending the depth of its combat systems and the amount of content.
