= Arcana Heart =

Arcade fighting video game series

- Genre: Fighting game
- Developers: Examu (until late-February 2020); Team Arcana
- Publishers: Examu, Atlus, Andamiro, AQ Interactive, Arc System Works, Aksys Games, Atlus, NIS America
- Platforms: Arcade, PlayStation 2, PlayStation Portable, PlayStation 3, PlayStation Vita, Xbox 360, Microsoft Windows
- First release: Arcana Heart; August 22, 2007
- Latest release: Arcana Heart 3: Love Max Six Stars Xtend!!!!! December 15, 2023

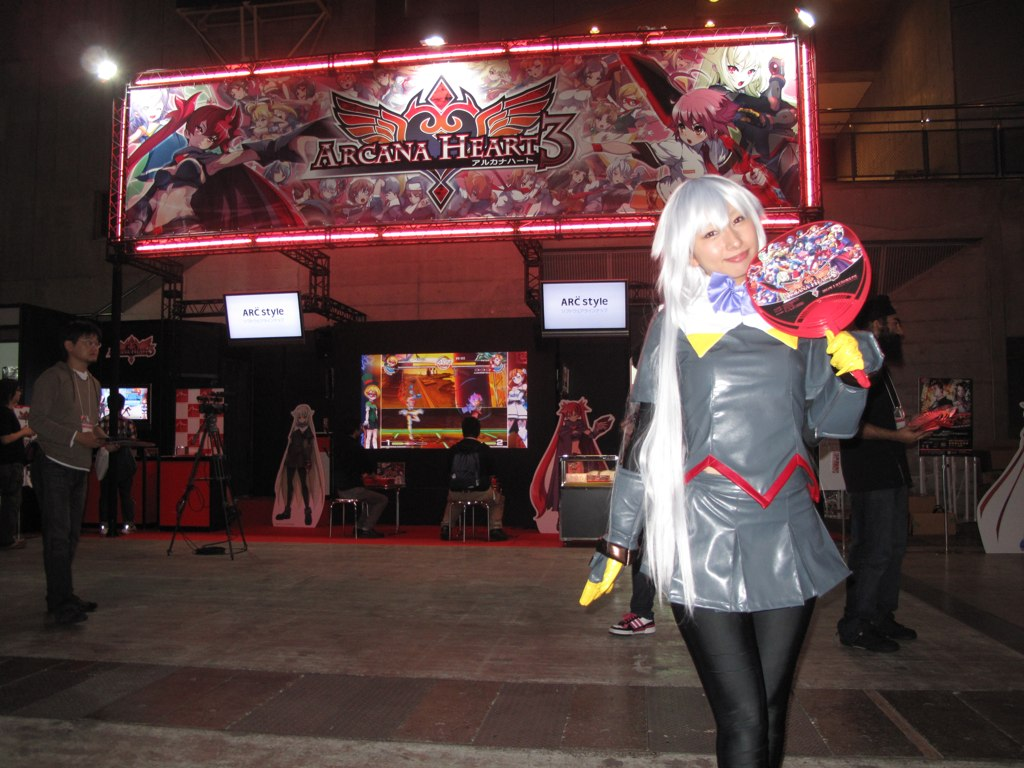
Promotion at the TGS 2010

Arcana Heart (アルカナハート, Arukana Hāto) is a 2D arcade fighting game series developed by Team Arcana (originally co-owned with its former parent company Examu). The first edition was released to arcades (mostly in Japan, but a few in other countries) in late 2007. The games feature an original all-female cast, and after choosing a character, the player chooses an "elemental alignment", or Arcana, which determines the character's special moves.

== Games ==
=== Arcana Heart 2 ===
Arcana Heart 2
- Developer: Examu
- Publishers: JP: Examu; NA: Andamiro
- Designer: Toru Sakurai (Sakuraitooru)
- Series: Arcana Heart
- Platform: Arcade
- Release: JP: March 21, 2008; JP: April 28, 2008 (Ver. 2.1); NA: October 2008
- Genre: Fighting game
- Mode: Up to 2 players simultaneously
- Arcade system: eX-Board

Arcana Heart 2 is the sequel to Arcana Heart. It was the first game in the series to be developed and published by Examu after the rights of the franchise had been transferred to the company from Yuki Enterprise. It was also the first game for Examu's proprietary eX-Board, an arcade board based on Windows XP Embedded that would become the standard platform for the rest of the series and other arcade games published by Examu. The game was unveiled at the AOU2008 Amusement Expo. Andamiro demonstrated the original version of Arcana Heart 2 in the US at the 2008 Amusement Expo conference from September 10 to September 12, 2008. The game was running in a Japanese "candy" cabinet but with English gameplay and artwork. It was released in the US in October 2008 as a conversion kit to change other arcade games into an Arcana Heart 2 arcade game.

The game features 6 new fighters, each with their own unique Arcana. New techniques were also included, such as the Arcana Blast, allowing the player to become temporarily invulnerable; Arcana Homing, a feature allowing the player to simultaneously close the distance between them and the opponent while homing in on them; and the Critical Heart, a devastating special attack unique to each character.

==== Suggoi! Arcana Heart 2 ====
Suggoi! Arcana Heart 2
- Developers: Arcade; Examu; PlayStation 2 Ecole Software
- Publishers: Arcade: JP: AMI Co., Ltd.; PlayStation 2: JP: AQ Interactive
- Designer: Toru Sakurai (Sakuraitooru)
- Series: Arcana Heart
- Platforms: Arcade, PlayStation 2
- Release: Arcade: JP: October 30, 2008; JP: February 27, 2009 (Ver. 2.6); PlayStation 2: JP: April 9, 2009
- Genre: Fighting game
- Mode: Up to 2 players simultaneously
- Arcade system: eX-Board

On October 30, 2008, Examu released a major update to Arcana Heart 2 called Suggoi! Arcana Heart 2. This version further balanced the game and fixed some bugs. It also featured some design changes, such as new character illustrations and a red redesign for Kaya Hirotaka. New additions included an additional stage; three new characters: Akane Inuwaka, Nazuna Inuwaka, and Parace L'Sia; their respective Arcana: Fenex (Sound), Kayatsuhime (Flower), Parace L'sia (Life); new color palettes for each character, available by pressing the Start button on the character select screen; and an additional training mode. Suggoi! Arcana Heart 2 was further updated to version 2.6 on February 27, 2009.

AQ Interactive handled the PlayStation 2 port of Suggoi! Arcana Heart 2, which was released only in Japan on April 9, 2009. It was planned for a worldwide release but was cancelled due to low sales of the first one, as well as poor performance and slowdown in gameplay, making the port weaker than the arcade perfect port of the first one.

=== Arcana Heart: Card of Glory ===
A spin-off of the series for mobile phones, Arcana Heart: Card of Glory, was jointly developed between Examu and Cave Co., Ltd. It is only available for NTT docomo phones through its i-mode service.

== Media ==
=== Manga ===
A manga adaptation based on the video game was serialized on the January 2008 issue of Comp Ace magazine. It was written and illustrated by Yuyuko Takemiya and was published on August 26, 2008.

=== Audio drama ===
The "Arcana Heart Fan Disc" was sold on October 24, 2007, at Comiket 72. The package included a DVD containing three audio dramas and interviews, and a CD containing three character songs and instrumental songs. A drama CD was included with the limited release of the Japanese PS2 game.

Arcana Heart Drama CD Heartful Situation was published by TEAM Entertainment. Episodes were released on July 23, 2008, and February 24, 2010.

=== Soundtracks ===
Arcana Heart Heartful Sound Collection was released on September 26, 2007, Arcana Heart 2 Heartful Sound Collection was released on April 9, 2008, Arcana Heart 2 Suggoi! Remix was released on February 5, 2009, and Arcana Heart 3 Heartful Sound Collection was released on January 13, 2010.

Each soundtrack has been primarily composed by Motoharu Yoshihira. Arcana Heart 2 Suggoi! Remix featured arrangements from a variety of composers, including Nobuyoshi Sano, Atsushi Ohara, Ayako Saso, Shinji Hosoe, Raito, and Takayuki Aihara. The soundtracks for the series have been published by TEAM Entertainment and distributed by Sony Music Entertainment Japan, with the exception of Arcana Heart 2 Suggoi! Remix, which was published by SuperSweep.

=== Arcade sticks ===
Japanese peripheral manufacturer Hori produced two limited edition arcade sticks for the series following the PlayStation 2 releases of Arcana Heart and Suggoi! Arcana Heart 2. The Arcana Heart arcade stick was released on December 20, 2007, and the Suggoi! Arcana Heart 2 arcade stick was released on April 9, 2009. A promotional campaign following the release of the Suggoi! Arcana Heart 2 arcade stick featured other goods such as postcards and beverage coasters.

== Characters ==
=== Introduced in Arcana Heart 2 ===
Petra Johanna Lagerkvist (ペトラ・ヨハンナ・ラーゲルクヴィスト)

Voiced by: Marina Inoue
Petra Johanna Lagerkvist (ペトラ・ヨハンナ・ラーゲルクヴィスト, Petora Yohanna Rāgerukuvisuto) is the series' secondary protagonist, introduced as the main protagonist of Arcana Heart 2. She comes from a long line of holy maidens from the Lagerkvist family and is the most powerful yet. Like her predecessors, she works for Sweden's Spirit Sector and is the youngest member to be selected to join their group. Her Arcana is Zillael, the Arcana of Holy, a highly revered winged unicorn.

Zenia Valov (ゼニア・ヴァロフ)

Voiced by: Kaori Shimizu
Zenia Valov (ゼニア・ヴァロフ, Zenia Varofu) is taciturn and quiet. An orphan in Moscow, she joined a team of Spirit Investigators and received training at a young age. When the organization was cutting back on personnel, she took the opportunity to leave and traveled the world as a Freelance Spirit Specialist. At first, Zenia has no memory of her previous life, but in Arcana Heart 3 she learns that her real name is Elfriede Achenbach (エルフリーデ・アッヒェンバッハ, Erufurīde Ahhyenbahha), and she is Lieselotte's older sister. Her Arcana is Almacia, the Arcana of Ice, a globetrotting penguin which became a higher being after years of experiences.

Elsa La Conti (エルザ・ラ・コンティ)

Voiced by: Kaya Miyake
Elsa La Conti (エルザ・ラ・コンティ, Eruza Ra Konti) enlisted in the Western Europe Spirit Sector after losing her entire family to demons. Elsa is usually mild-mannered and straightforward, but sometimes she's also airheaded and too strict on herself. Her Arcana is Koshmar, the Arcana of Punishment, who saved her life when she was mortally injured in a fight with Clarice.

Clarice Di Lanza (クラリーチェ・ディ・ランツァ)

Voiced by: Sayaka Ohara
Clarice Di Lanza' (クラリーチェ・ディ・ランツァ, Kurarīche Di Rantsa) used to be a noble from the Demon Realm, but she abandoned such a lavish life style and decided to live in the human world due to the influence of Lilica's father, Felchenerow. She always has a composed personality and a smile on her face. When the Western Europe Spirit Sector sent Elsa to fight her to the death, Clarice saved her life by imbuing the power of the Arcana "Punishment" into Elsa. Clarice took for herself the power of the opposing Arcana of Sin, Sorwat.

Catherine Kyohbashi (キャサリン京橋)

Voiced by: Ai Matayoshi
Catherine Kyohbashi (キャサリン京橋, Kyasarin Kyōbashi) is a blond-haired, blue-eyed American of Japanese descent, from the Osaka region. She has a bright and friendly personality, as well as an intellect that rivals Kira's; she enrolled in MIT's College of Spirit Research at the age of ten. Her Arcana is Medein, the Arcana of Magnetism, appears as a giant turtle and helps Catherine with her spirit research.

Dorothy Albright (ドロシー・オルブライト)

Voiced by: Yu Kobayashi
Dorothy Albright (ドロシー・オルブライト, Doroshī Oruburaito) appears to be a young boy at first glance. As "Dorothy the Wizard", she performs with her parents on the stages of Las Vegas. She has a strong sense of justice and, like her mother, helps the American Spirit Department whenever she can. Her Arcana is Heliogabalus, the Arcana of Mirror, which resembles a giant swarm of ladybugs, spiraling like a kaleidoscope.

Angelia Avallone (アンジェリア・アヴァロン)

Voiced by: Eri Sendai
Angelia Avallone (アンジェリア・アヴァロン, Anjeria Avaron) is the main antagonist and final boss of Arcana Heart 2. She is cheerful and openhearted, but egotistical. Seven years ago, she willingly traveled to the Arcana World from the physical world and, since then, has stopped aging. Her Arcana is Mildred, the Arcana of Halo ("Light" in the English version of Arcana Heart 3), who is her twin sister caught in a dimensional split between her world and the spirit world and received new powers as a result. Mildred was the main antagonist and final boss of the first Arcana Heart game, but now serves as Angelia's guardian following her defeat.

=== Introduced in Suggoi! Arcana Heart 2 ===
Akane Inuwaka (犬若 あかね)

Voiced by: Mayumi Shindou
Akane Inuwaka (犬若 あかね, Inuwaka Akane) is the titular character and main protagonist of the second game's update Suggoi! Arcana Heart 2. She is the older sister of Nazuna and part of the Inuwaka clan, a family of shinobi that aid the Thousand Year Protector. She is overprotective of her younger sister but doesn't let it show and always appears calm and composed. She is a strategic genius who always tries to do what she considers "cool". Her Arcana is Phenex, the Arcana of Sound, who was charmed by her singing voice and now lends its power to her.

Nazuna Inuwaka (犬若 なずな)

Voiced by: Mai Hashiomoto
Nazuna Inuwaka (犬若 なずな, Inuwaka Nazuna) is the younger sister of Akane and part of the clan that rivals Konoha's. Nazuna seeks to find her own destiny outside of the Inuwaka clan and is always attempting to prove herself. She fights using her three sacred weapons Tsumiko (cane), Fusumi (crow) and Hayata (wolf). Her Arcana is Kayatsuhime, the Arcana of Flower, she is protector the Inuwaka clan who governs over growth, prosperity, and harvest.

Parace L'sia (パラセ・ルシア)

Voiced by: Ryoko Ono
Parace L'sia (パラセ・ルシア, Parase Rushia) is the main antagonist and final boss of Arcana Heart 2: Suggoi!, and serves the same role in the score attack mode in Arcana Heart 3. While a human, she lived in Switzerland during the Renaissance and worked as an alchemist, but after death her soul was sent to the Arcana world, where she became Paracelsia, the Arcana of Life. She refers to herself as the "Millennium Keeper", and has a long-standing rivalry with Kamui Tokinomiya. In an attempt to control life and distort dimensions, she has visited the physical world several times to collect and refine magical stones, causing many incidents. Later in Arcana Heart 3 she becomes the Arcana of Pistrix No. 29.

== See also ==
- Arcana Heart
- Arcana Heart 3
