= List of cancelled NES games =

The Family Computer, nicknamed the Famicom for short, is a 1983 video game console produced by Nintendo. The system would be redesigned and brought to Western markets as the Nintendo Entertainment System (NES) in 1985. Both systems proved very successful and had several games released for them, until being succeeded by the Super Famicom and Super NES in 1990. This list documents games that were confirmed to be announced or in development for the Famicom or NES at some point but did not end up being released for them.

== Games ==
There are currently 45 games on this list. (Note: This number is always up to date by this script.)

List of cancelled NES games
Title(s)	Notes/Reasons	Developer	Publisher
007: Licence to Kill	A video game adaptation of the James Bond film Licence to Kill was released by Domark in 1989 for multiple platforms. A port of the game for NES was being developed by Tengen and scheduled to release in June 1990, but was cancelled due to the publisher believing too much time had passed since the release of the film it was meant to promote.	Tengen	Tengen
Ace Harding: Lost in Las Vegas	An NES port of Deja Vu II: Lost in Las Vegas (1988) was announced in 1991, with screenshots appearing in the February 1993 issue of Nintendo Power. However, the game was never released, presumably due to the NES having already been succeeded by the SNES at that point.		Kemco
The Addams Family 2	A video game adaptation of Addams Family Values was announced for release in 1993 alongside the film, but never materialized.	Ocean Software	Ocean Software
The Adventures of Dewey the Dolphin	A video game starring an anthropomorphic dolphin character was briefly mentioned in issue 13 of Electronic Gaming Monthly, but failed to materialize.	Ocean Software	Ocean Software
The Adventures of Dr. Franken	Ports of Dr. Franken (1992) were developed for NES, Game Boy, and SNES, but the NES version was never released.	Elite Systems	
Animal Exchange	Originally conceived for NES, production later shifted to the SNES, where it released under the new title Claymates (1993).	Visual Concepts	Interplay Entertainment
Battle Choice	A humorous take on Shogi that featured real time combat when pieces came into contact with one another, the game was cancelled without ever being announced. A prototype of the game surfaced in an online auction in 2022.	Konami	Konami
BC Games	A sports game in which cavemen compete in Olympics-style competitions, such as dinosaur racing, was prototyped for the NES, but the project was never greenlit.	Rare	Unknown
Bio Force Ape	A sidescrolling platformer in which the player controls a mutant ape was announced in 1991, with early previews noting the high speed of the gameplay compared to other NES games. The game was never released, though a prototype of the game surfaced online in 2010.	SETA Corporation	SETA Corporation
Black Tiger	A port of the arcade game Black Tiger (1987) was announced but never released.	Capcom	Capcom
Block Out	A port of the arcade game Blockout (1989) was in development for NES, but never materialized.	Technōs Japan	American Technōs
The California Raisins: The Grape Escape	A video game based on the California Raisins was planned for release in 1990, but was cancelled due to the characters' dwindling popularity.	Radiance	Capcom
Cheetahmen II	A sequel to The Cheetahmen, one of the games featured in the unlicensed compilation Action 52 (1991), was set for release as part of plans to expand the property into a multimedia franchise. While the game was never officially released, several cartridges were found in a warehouse in 1996 and became collector's items on the secondary market.	Active Enterprises	Active Enterprises
Chip's Challenge	An NES port of Chip's Challenge (1989) was demonstrated at the 1991 Summer Consumer Electronics Show, set to be released later that year, but failed to materialize.	Bullet-Proof Software	Epyx
Days of Thunder	A video game based on the film Days of Thunder was developed by programmer Chris Oberth. For unknown reasons, the project was cancelled and Beam Software released their own Days of Thunder game for NES in 1990. Following Oberth's death in 2012, the Video Game History Foundation obtained several development materials from his estate in 2020, including the source code for Days of Thunder spread across several floppy disks, and used them to reconstruct Oberth's original version of the game.		Mindscape
Dennis the Menace	A video game adaptation of the 1993 film of the same name was announced for release on NES, Amiga, Game Boy, and SNES. However, the NES version was never released.	Ocean Software	Ocean Software
Dino-Hockey	A hockey game featuring dinosaurs was said to be planned for a 1991 release, but failed to materialize. An early prototype later surfaced online.		
Drac's Night Out	A 2D platformer starring Count Dracula and prominently featuring Reebok Pump shoes as part of a sponsorship deal, the game was never officially released, though a prototype later surfaced online.	Microsmiths	Parker Brothers
The Fairyland Story	A port of the arcade game The Fairyland Story (1985) was planned for release in 1986, but failed to materialize. A prototype was later discovered and released online in 2022.	Taito	Taito
Final Fantasy IV	Though initially planned for release on Famicom, no actual work was done before the decision was made to shift development to the Super Famicom.	Squaresoft	Squaresoft
Glug!	In 1986, Rare programmer Paul Proctor developed Glug, a shooting game in which players controlled a slime on a cylinder that would rotate when the player moved, causing enemy positions to shift. While approximately 60–70% complete, the project was ultimately abandoned.	Rare	
Golden Empire: The Legend of Scheherazade	A sequel to The Magic of Scheherazade (1987) was mentioned by GamePro in the magazine's September 1990 issue for its coverage of the Summer CES, and by Nintendo Power in its November/December 1990 issue. At the Winter Consumer Electronics Show in January 1992, GamePro reported that an SNES game titled Golden Empire was officially announced by Culture Brain as a follow-up to The Magic of Scheherazade. The magazine made further mention of the game in their coverage of the following year's Winter CES, now titled Golden Empire: The Legend of Scheherazade. As late as 1996, the Japanese publication Family Computer Magazine listed the game for Super Famicom as Scheherazade Densetsu - The Prelude, with an unknown release date. Ultimately, the game never materialized.	Culture Brain	Culture Brain
Hellraiser	A video game adaptation of the 1987 film Hellraiser entered into development, but was never released.	Color Dreams	Color Dreams
Hit the Ice	Taito intended to port the arcade game Hit the Ice (1990) to the NES with additional features, including a single-player campaign with RPG elements, but decided to cancel the port due to it being very late in the console's life cycle. A complete prototype was later discovered as part of the 2020 Nintendo data leak.		Taito
John Madden Football	Ports of John Madden Football '93 (1992) for Game Boy and NES were scheduled for release by the end of 1993, to be published by Ubi Soft. However, both versions were ultimately cancelled.	NMS Software	Ubi Soft
Minnesota State Lottery	In the early 1990s, the Minnesota State Lottery partnered with a technology company to develop a lottery cartridge for a modem-equipped NES, hoping it would lead to increased ticket sales. However, the organization received substantial opposition by advocates worried that use of an in-home video game console would encourage youth gambling, leading the project to be cancelled.	Control Data	Control Data
Pitstop II	A port of the 1984 racing game was scheduled for a 1986 release, but never materialized.	Pony Canyon	
Police Academy	An NES game based on the Police Academy film series was set for a 1990 release, but the game experienced multiple delays and at one point restarted development before eventually being cancelled.	Tengen	Tengen
Pyross	A NES port of the arcade game Wardner (1987) was planned for release in North America under the name Pyross. Though demonstrated at the Summer Consumer Electronics Show in 1990, the port was never released.	Sammy Corporation	Sammy Corporation
SimCity	A port of SimCity for NES, developed concurrently with the game's 1991 SNES port and including many of the same features, was demonstrated at the 1991 Consumer Electronics Show, but was never released. A prototype of the NES version was discovered in 2018 and released online by the Video Game History Foundation.	Maxis	Nintendo
Space Ace	A version of Space Ace (1984) was developed for NES, redesigned as a side-scrolling platformer instead of a FMV game, similar to the 1990 NES port of Dragon's Lair. However, the game was never released.		
Splatter World	An RPG spinoff of the Splatterhouse series was planned for release in March 1993, with promotional materials sent to Japanese retailers in late 1992, but was never released, speculated to be the result of the Famicom's declining userbase. In 2025, a nearly complete prototype was discovered and released online.	Namco	Namco
Street Fighter	A port of Street Fighter (1989) for NES entered development, but was never released. Only one screenshot from the port is known to exist, which was rediscovered during development of the Street Fighter 30th Anniversary Collection.	Pacific Dataworks International	Capcom
Street Fighter II: The World Warrior	In response to a reader question about an unlicensed NES port of Street Fighter II (1991), Electronic Gaming Monthly stated that they had heard from a Capcom representative at the Consumer Electronics Show that an official NES port would be released later in 1993. However, no such port was ever released.	Capcom	Capcom
Sunman	In the early 1990s, Sunsoft began developing a video game based on DC Comics' Superman. However, the company later lost the license, prompting them to change the protagonist into an original character, "Sunman", to salvage the work that had already been done. Ultimately, the game went unreleased, though a complete prototype of the Sunman version and an earlier prototype of the Superman version both surfaced online years later.	EIM	Sunsoft
Super Password	In 1988, GameTek adapted the game show Super Password into a video game for MS-DOS, Apple II, and Commodore 64. While an NES version of the game was announced in 1990, the port never released.	GameTek	GameTek
Super Sushi Pinball	A localization of Super Pinball (1988), which replaced the game's original Mahjong theming with new graphics and cutscenes related to sushi, was demonstrated at the 1989 Consumer Electronics Show and planned for a 1990 release, but failed to materialize. A finished prototype of the game was later discovered and released online by the Video Game History Foundation.	Soft Machine	CSG Imagesoft
Thomas the Tank Engine & Friends: Adventure Series	A video game adaptation of the Thomas the Tank Engine & Friends television series was announced for release on NES, SNES, and Sega Genesis. While the 16-bit versions released in 1993, the NES version was delayed to the following year before ultimately being cancelled.	Software Creations	THQ
Time Diver: Eon Man	The action game Time Diver: Eon Man had been completed and received a walkthrough and review in Nintendo Power, but went unreleased for unknown reasons.	A.I.	Taito
Titan Warriors	Capcom intended to release a sequel to their very first arcade game, Vulgus (1984), but the game was cancelled during development. A prototype of the game later surfaced in 2024.	Capcom	Capcom
Ultimate Journey	An action game starring a Native American warrior capable of transforming into different animals was near enough to completion that it received a review in Electronic Gaming Monthly, but was cancelled for unknown reasons.	Bandai	Bandai
UWC	A wrestling game based on the Universal Wrestling Company license was in development, but was cancelled before ever being announced. A private collector later obtained a prototype of the game and released it online.	Thinking Rabbit	SETA Corporation
The Wizard of Oz	A video game adaptation of The Wizard of Oz was announced for NES and SNES, but only the latter version was released.	SETA Corporation	SETA Corporation
Xcavator	Originally programmed by Chris Oberth in 1991, the game failed to find a publisher. The game's source code was later found in Oberth's archives, which were donated by his estate to the Video Game History Foundation. Incredible Technologies subsequently donated the game's IP rights to the nonprofit, who worked to reassemble the source code and finish the game with assistance from Mega Cat Studios. Cartridges of the finished game, under the name Xcavator 2025, were released through iam8bit in 2026, with all proceeds going to funding the Video Game History Foundation.	Incredible Technologies	
Xybots	A port of the arcade game Xybots (1987) was advertised in magazines for an April 1990 release, but failed to materialize.	Tengen	Tengen
