= The Magic of Scheherazade =

1987 video game

- North American cover art
- Developer: Culture Brain
- Publisher: Culture Brain
- Producer: Akademiya Yumenosuke
- Composers: Akinori Sawa; Shunichi Mikame
- Platform: Nintendo Entertainment System
- Release: JP: September 3, 1987; NA: January 1990
- Genres: Action-adventure, role-playing
- Mode: Single-player

The Magic of Scheherazade (Note: Known as Arabian Dream Scheherazade (アラビアンドリーム シェラザード, Arabian Dorimu Sherazado) in Japan.) is an action-adventure/role-playing video game (RPG) developed and released by Culture Brain for the Nintendo Entertainment System (NES). The game was released in 1987 in Japan and 1990 in North America. The plot is based on Middle Eastern folktales from One Thousand and One Nights. It involves an amnesic hero traveling through time in an attempt to rescue the princess Scheherazade from the evil wizard Sabaron, who has summoned a horde of demons to bring chaos to the once peaceful land of Arabia. The Magic of Scheherazade is divided into chapters and incorporates elements of both action-adventure and RPG gameplay styles. In each chapter, the player character can freely explore an overworld in a top-down perspective. The player engages hostile enemies with various weapons and spells through both real-time solo action on the overhead map and random, turn-based battles fought alongside befriended allies.

Once the commercial viability of the NES was proven in North America by the late 1980s, Japanese developer Culture Brain opened a company branch in the United States and chose to publish an English-language version of The Magic of Scheherazade after making several changes to the graphics and musical score. It has received mostly average review scores, but generally positive commentary from critics for its visuals, gameplay, and difficulty balance. The game has been noted for its fusion of the adventure and RPG genres, though journalists have referred to its gameplay mechanics as lower-quality versions of what was seen in both The Legend of Zelda and the Dragon Quest series.

== Gameplay ==
The player battles enemies in the overworld. The character class, experience level, and other statistics are displayed at the bottom.

The Magic of Scheherazade combines gameplay elements from action-adventure games and RPGs. In the game, the player must travel through a series of worlds and defeat the evil wizard Sabaron, rescue Scheherazade, and bring peace back to Arabia. The game consists of five chapters; the first four chapters involve the player's journey through four worlds in which they must find the palace and defeat the demon that resides there. The fifth chapter involves the final battle with Sabaron. Players may start a new game or resume the game with a password. If a new game is started, the player must choose between three classes – Fighter, Magician, or Saint. Each class differs in weapon usage and certain abilities. For instance, a Fighter can use strong swords, but is limited with the rod, a Magician is adept at using powerful rods, but is restricted to a weak dagger instead of swords, and a Saint can exclusively utilize items like boots that prevent damage on hazardous floors. Weapons, spells, items, and actions like speaking or jumping can be mapped to the gamepad's "A" or "B" buttons on a select subscreen. A status bar displays the player character's selected actions, character class, attributes, coins, and some expendable supplies.

Most of the gameplay takes place on an overhead map where the player can freely move between separate screens. The overworld comprises numerous landscapes and locales including forests, deserts, towns, underwater areas, dimly-lit dungeons, and palace labyrinths. The player will also find "Time Gates" that allow for time travel between the past, present, and future; they transport the player to the same location, but in a different time and environment. In the towns, the player can interact with NPCs to gather information, initiate quests, find new party members, purchase supplies at shops, replenish party members' hit points (HP) and magic points (MP) at hotels, gamble money at casinos, and change character class or save their progress via passwords at mosques.

In the overworld, enemies will often randomly appear and are fought in real time. The player can use a sword for close-range attacks, a rod for firing long-range projectiles, and magic spells. Slaying enemies earns the player experience points that go towards increasing overall experience levels. Reaching higher levels improves the player's maximum attributes (HP and MP) and can sometimes enhance weapon strength or yield new spells. When transitioning between screens on the overhead map, the player will sometimes encounter turn-based battles with groups of enemies. The start of each battle gives the player the option to fight, escape, or attempt to bribe enemies into leaving. Fighting alone or with up to two allies, the player takes turns trading blows with enemy units by picking commands such as striking or casting magic. Formations (learned for a fee at "Magic Universities" in certain towns) can also be created, which can grant the party added defense or enable them to cast powerful group spells; certain formations work particularly well against specific "squads" or "regiments". Finally, mercenary troopers, which can be hired in towns, can be used to aid the party in attacks.

== Plot ==
The fantasy setting of The Magic of Scheherazade borrows from Middle Eastern folk tales in One Thousand and One Nights. Many years prior to the opening of the game, the land of Arabia was taken over by the malevolent demon Goragora and his army of minions. A magician named Isfa, harnessing the power of the blue star Airosche, vanquished the demons and sealed them underground. Peace briefly returned until the evil wizard Sabaron freed Goragora and the demons from their captivity and imprisoned the Arabian princess Scheherazade and her family.

The player character takes on the role of Isfa's unnamed descendant, who unsuccessfully attempts to save his lover Scheherazade from Sabaron. As a result, the player's memories are erased, his magical powers are sealed, and he is thrust into a different time period. He is quickly greeted by the catlike spirit Coronya, who possesses the ability to open a passage to travel through time. With this, the amnesic hero traverses through five worlds in order to regain his memories, learn new magic, recruit several allies, and defeat the demon overlords. Once Scheherazade's three sisters and father are rescued, the protagonist confronts Sabaron, who realizes releasing Goragora was a mistake. The hero then goes to the Dark World and destroys Goragora, returning tranquility to Arabia once again. After being thanked by Scheherazade and her family, the hero promises to return someday as he and his party depart on a magic carpet toward their next adventure.

== Development and release ==
The Magic of Scheherazade was developed for the Nintendo Entertainment System (Famicom in Japan) by Culture Brain. A person working under the pseudonym "Akademiya Yumenosuke" was the game's producer, according to a Weekly Famitsu interview. Akinori Sawa and Shunichi Mikame worked as its composers. Sawa worked primarily on Culture Brain's Hiryū no Ken series. Mikame had previously composed the scores for both Kung Fu Heroes and Flying Dragon: The Secret Scroll. His musical equipment consisted of two polyphonic synthesizers, a frequency modulation synthesizer, and a hardware sequencer. Compositions were recorded to audio cassette and then simplified to the Famicom's programmable sound generator, once approved by the producer. Only three of the six songs Mikame composed were used in game, and he left the company before its Japanese release.

The Magic of Scheherazade was released in Japan on September 3, 1987. Tokuma Shoten published an official strategy guide for The Magic of Scheherazade in Japan in November. A short manga based on the game titled Magical Book (Note: Magical Book (マジカルブック, Majikarubukku)) was published in Japan and features all the game's party members. Culture Brain's North American division chose to release the game as it fit the company's business model for international releases. Culture Brain USA announced the game in mid-1988 with a tentative release set for January 1989. It was delayed, but was showcased that month at the Winter Consumer Electronics Show (CES) with other Culture Brain USA games for the NES, including Kung Fu Heroes and Flying Dragon: The Secret Scroll; it was showcased once again at 1990's Winter CES, this time alongside Baseball Simulator 1.000. The game was released in North America on January 1990. Culture Brain made many changes for the English-language localization, including the alternation of character and monster sprites, changes of the facial features in the characters to look more undistinguished, simplification of the overworld map, the usage of character text during gameplay, and the inclusion of new music. The game's official soundtrack was released in Japan by Cassetron on October 25, 2023 and includes music from the overseas version.

== Reception ==
Reception

Review scores
Publication	Score
Electronic Gaming Monthly	22 / 40
Famitsu	27 / 40
Nintendo Power	3.375 / 5
Family Computer Magazine	19.56 / 30
VideoGames & Computer Entertainment	6 / 10

Award
Publication	Award
Game Players	"Best Graphics" (1989)

The Magic of Scheherazade received mixed reviews at release. Opinions of the graphics and musical score have been mostly positive. Both William R. Trotter of Game Players and Rusel DeMaria of VideoGames & Computer Entertainment commended the game's visuals, but DeMaria simply characterized the music and sound as "fine". Trotter was specifically impressed with the magic spell effects, characters sprites, and environments. Game Players awarded the game "Best Graphics" for console titles first previewed in the US in 1989. Contrarily, reviewers from a 1990 EGM panel discounted the game's presentation as either average or not up to the standards of the game's contemporaries.

The gameplay and challenge were also high points for many reviewers. Trotter applauded the amount of content and compared the time-consuming yet intuitive learning curve for the game's mechanics to the Ultima series. He said: "Everything is clearly organized, so what at first seems unwieldy soon becomes natural and logical". DeMaria found the game easy yet satisfying, summarizing that it might offer enjoyment for new and intermediate players while experienced players could still find "enough plot twists and interesting challenges to make the game fun to play". GamePro likewise recommended the game to beginner, intermediate, and advanced players. EGM found the game as an overall mediocre diversion to other RPGs of its time, but similarly acknowledged the gameplay as being "nicely handled" and "easy to catch on to". One of the magazine's writers, Ed Semrad, appreciated its challenge level and referred to it as the next "decent quest game" following Zelda II: The Adventure of Link.

Critics have addressed the game's similarities to other action-adventure titles and turn-based RPGs, as well as its blending of the two genres. Several compared the game's top-down adventure aesthetic and interface to The Legend of Zelda. DeMaria recognized the two games' resemblance, but noted The Magic of Scheherazade as being much more linear. Hardcore Gaming 101's Michael Ayala contrasted the time travel aspect with A Link to the Past and its turn-based battles with those of Dragon Quest. He admitted that both features felt unpolished in The Magic of Scheherazade, but proclaimed the soundtrack as "excellent" aside from one "incredibly grating" theme heard in rare instances during battle. Destructoid contributor Colette Bennett praised the music and found the Middle East-inspired setting unique amid medieval-themed RPGs of its release period. Andrew Vestal of GameSpot comically described the game as a result of two development groups feuding over whether to create a turn-based RPG or an action RPG. He credited the game as being one of the first RPGs to introduce team attacks, in which two party members could join forces to perform extra-powerful magic. Video game journalist and Retronauts writer Jeremy Parish described the game in 2017 as "innovative and memorable", even declaring it to be Culture Brain's "crown jewel" when mentioning its conspicuous absence from Nintendo's Virtual Console service.

== Legacy ==
A sequel to The Magic of Scheherazade was first listed by Nintendo for a future 1990 release for the NES in that year's official buyers guide for World of Nintendo retail boutiques. The sequel was further noted by GamePro in the magazine's September 1990 issue for its coverage of the Summer CES. Nintendo Power also mentioned it in its November/December 1990 issue. At the Winter CES in January 1992, GamePro reported that an SNES game titled Golden Empire was officially announced by Culture Brain as a follow-up to The Magic of Scheherazade. One year later, GamePro published a similar tidbit from an article about the 1993 Winter CES, where the game was then titled Golden Empire: The Legend of Scheherazade. Gaming retail chain Chips & Bits continuously advertised Golden Empire under its SNES role-playing section in US magazine catalogs throughout the early to mid-1990s. As late as 1996, the Japanese publication Family Computer Magazine listed the game as Scheherazade Densetsu - The Prelude (Note: Legend of Scheherazade - The Prelude (シェラザード伝説 ザ プレリュード, Sherazado Densetsu - Za Pureryudo)) with an unknown release date for the Super Famicom.

The Super Nintendo Entertainment System game Super Ninja Boy includes a town called Celestern, named after one of the worlds in The Magic of Scheherazade, and contains its musical theme from that game and cameos from characters like Princess Scheherazade and Coronya.
