= Flying dragon (disambiguation) =

Flying dragons is the common name of gliding lizards in the genus Draco, particularly the species Draco volans.

It may also refer to:

== Entertainment ==
- Flying Dragon series of video games created by Culture Brain known as Hiryu no Ken in Japan
  - Flying Dragon: The Secret Scroll, the first game in the series
- Flying Dragon (Calder), an Alexander Calder sculpture at the Art Institute of Chicago
- "The Flying Dragon", 1966 season 2 episode from Mystery and Imagination

== Biology ==
- A cultivar of Trifoliate orange
- Draco (lizard) a genus of lizards
- Xianglong, a gliding lizard of the Cretaceous period

== Geography ==
- Thang Long, the old name of Hanoi, Vietnam

== Other uses ==
- Flying Dragons (gang), a Chinese-American organized crime group
- A trademark of Yomeishu that is said to be the first trademark in Japan in 1603. The trademark was given by the shōgun Ieyasu Tokugawa.
- SAC-46 Flying Dragon, handgun, USA

== See also ==
- Hiryu (disambiguation)
- Magic dragon
