= Combo (video games) =

Swift sequence of moves

In video games, a combo (short for combination) is a set of actions performed in sequence, usually with strict timing limitations, that yield a significant benefit or advantage. The term originates from fighting games where it is based upon the concept of a striking combination. It has been since applied more generally to a wide variety of genres, such as puzzle games, shoot 'em ups, and sports games. Combos are commonly used as an essential gameplay element, but can also serve as a high score or attack power modifier, or simply as a way to exhibit an exuberant playing style.

In fighting games, combo specifically indicates a timed sequence of moves that produce a cohesive series of hits, each of which leaves the opponent unable to block.

== History ==
John Szczepaniak of Hardcore Gaming 101 considers Data East's DECO Cassette System arcade title Flash Boy (1981), a scrolling action game based on the manga and anime series Astro Boy, to have a type of combo mechanic. When the player punches an enemy and it explodes, debris can destroy other enemies.

=== Fighting games ===
The earliest known fighting game that used a combo system was Culture Brain's Shanghai Kid in 1985. When the spiked speech balloon that reads "RUSH!" pops up during battle, the player has a chance to rhythmically perform a series of attacks called "rush-attacking". It resembles the "custom combo" attacks in Street Fighter Alpha 2 (1996).

The combo notion was reintroduced to fighting games and popularized with Street Fighter II (1991) by Capcom, when skilled players learned that they could combine several attacks which left no time for the computer player to recover if they timed them correctly. Combos were a design accident; lead producer Noritaka Funamizu noticed that extra strikes were possible during a bug check on the car-smashing bonus stage. He thought that the timing required was too difficult to make it a useful game feature, but left it in as a hidden one. Combos have since become a design priority in almost all fighting games, and range from the simplistic to the highly intricate. The first game to count the hits of each combo, and reward the player for performing them, was Super Street Fighter II (1993).

=== Beat 'em up games ===
The use of combo attacks in beat 'em up games originated from Technōs Japan's arcade games, Renegade in 1986 and Double Dragon in 1987. In contrast to earlier games that let players knock out enemies with a single blow, the opponents in Renegade and Double Dragon could take more punishment, requiring a succession of punches. The first hit would temporarily immobilize the enemy, making him unable to defend himself against successive punches. Combo attacks would later become more dynamic in Capcom's Final Fight, released in 1989.

=== Rhythm games ===
In rhythm games, combo measures how many consecutive notes have received at least the second-worst judgment (i.e. other than the worst judgment). Never receiving the worst judgment in the entire song is called a full combo or a no miss.

Receiving the best judgment for all notes in the song is called a full perfect combo or an all perfect. Some rhythm games have an internal judgment that is tighter than the best judgment, e.g. Critical Perfect in Maimai or S-Critical in Sound Voltex. Receiving an internal judgment for all notes in a song is called a 理論値.

== Other uses ==
Many other types of video games include a combo system involving chains of tricks or other maneuvers, usually in order to build up bonus points to obtain a high score. Examples include the Tony Hawk's Pro Skater series, the Crazy Taxi series, and Pizza Tower. The first game with score combos was Data East's 1981 DECO Cassette System arcade game Flash Boy.

Combos are a main feature in many puzzle games, such as Columns, Snood and Magical Drop. They are primarily used as a scoring device, but in the modes of play that are level-based, are used to more quickly gain levels. Shoot 'em ups have increasingly incorporated combo systems, such as in Ikaruga, as have hack-and-slash games, such as Dynasty Warriors.

== See also ==
- Konami Code
- Fighting game terms at Wiktionary
