= Gamemaster (disambiguation) =

A gamemaster is a person who acts as an organizer for a multiplayer role-playing game.

Gamemaster or Game Master may also refer to:

- Action Gamemaster, character from The Cheetahmen
  - Action Gamemaster, vaporware handheld clone console named after the above
- Gamemaster (board game series), board war game
- Game Masters (exhibition), exhibition at ACMI
- Captain N: The Game Master, joint-venture between American-Canadian animated television series
- Game Master (console), handheld game console
- Konami Game Master, a game enhancer for the MSX home computer designed for Konami titles.
- Game Master Network, a YouTube detective series and franchise

== See also ==
- Gamesmaster (disambiguation)
