= Streemerz =

2010 video game

- Developer: Arthur Lee
- Publisher: Arthur Lee
- Platforms: Flash, NES
- Release: 2010
- Genre: Platformer
- Mode: Single-player

Streemerz is a retro-style fan remake of the platformer video game of the same name, originally released as part of the notorious Action 52 compilation for NES. It was developed by Arthur Lee, a.k.a. Mr. Podunkian, for the "Action 52 Owns" game jam he organized, released in 2010 for both NES and Flash. The main character, Streemerz operative Superb Joe (a parody of Super Joe) has placed an explosive device in the core of the flying fortress of the evil Master Y., and must escape to the top of the fortress solely using his grappling hook and the ability to walk back and forth. If he touches any of the glowing orbs in the level (dubbed "Master Y.'s balls"), the protagonist will perish. Additional threats include pie-throwing clown guards. The game was critically well-received for both its comedic story, which is purposely written in Engrish as a reference to poor NES localizations, and gameplay, and seen as a tremendous improvement compared to the source material.

== Development ==
Streemerz was created for the "Action 52 Owns" game jam, in which indie developers attempted to make better versions of individual Action 52 games as part of a new compilation. The original Streemerz was a party-themed platformer with "pie-throwing clowns, burning candles and bouncing balls". While some of these elements (which Lee called "disastrous") were retained for the remake, the setting was drastically changed to a more science-fiction-based one.

== Reception ==
Streemerz was positively rated by Jason Kelk of Retro Gamer, who described it as "looking and sounding significantly better than the title that inspired it", as well as "extremely challenging" on the default difficulty, though he praised the inclusion of an easy mode. The game was included in 250 Indie Games You Must Play by Mike Rose, who described the game as "pretty tough later on", but noted that it had copious amounts of checkpoints. Tom Senior of PC Gamer featured the game, saying that "the mechanics are simple, but moving through each screen takes plenty of skill, and a lot of repeatedly dying". He noted that "the satisfaction gained from acrobatically defeating a seemingly impossible room makes up for the insta-death frustrations", also enjoying the game's "ridiculous sense of humor". Quintin Smith of Rock Paper Shotgun called the game "neat", with "incredible" dialog, recommending players try it. The game was mentioned again on Rock Paper Shotgun by Porpentine, who praised the game's modes and intentionally shoddy dialog. James Murff of Big Download described Streemerz as "extremely punishing and quite fulfilling".

== See also ==
- Action 52
- Bionic Commando – NES game with similar gameplay
- Merry Gear Solid 2 – also developed by Arthur Lee
