= Flying Warriors =

1991 video game

- Developer: Culture Brain
- Publisher: Culture Brain
- Series: Hiryū no Ken
- Platform: Nintendo Entertainment System
- Release: NA: February 1991
- Genre: Action
- Mode: Single-player

Flying Warriors is a 1991 action video game in the Hiryū no Ken series. It was developed and published by Culture Brain for the NES.

== Gameplay ==
The game features combat in a variety of formats, such as kicking and using fireballs to repel monsters in scrolling stages, a system during one-on-one duels against Tusk Soldiers or a pair of martial arts tournaments where the player must attack a mark that appears on their opponent's body, or defend the area when it appears on them (this system is similar to Culture Brain's original Flying Dragon for the NES), and RPG-style command battles against monster bosses. When confronted by a Tusk Soldier or other otherworldly villain, Rick can change into a costumed superhero form or switch with one of his teammates. The player must switch to Flying Warrior form to use the characters' magic powers and defend themselves from the Tusk Soldiers' magic spells.

== Plot ==
A long time ago, Demonyx of the Dark Dimension attempted to invade the Light Dimension. After a long battle, the hero of the Light Dimension, Dragonlord, sealed Demonyx up by the power of the Mandara Talisman, at which time Demonyx prophesied that he would be back upon the appearance of the Red Evil Star.

Years later, an ominous red star appeared in the sky. Just then, five shooting lights came down toward the ground.

Rick Stalker was brought up by Kung Fu master Gen Lao-Tsu, and is alone in the mountains as usual brushing up on his Kung Fu skills when he comes upon a weeping angel missing her robe. He explores the mountain's caves and ends up encountering a gargoyle who is really a Tusk Soldier in disguise guarding the robe, which is embedded in a rock. Upon the return of her robe, the angel shows Rick a secret passage down the ravine, where he finds a mysterious orb.

Rick goes back to tell Gen the whole story. Gen apprises him that this orb is the Orb of Courage, and that Rick should cross the ocean to Gen's motherland China, where his fate is waiting for him.

Rick goes to China and enters the Shorin temple, the head temple of Kung-Fu, where he spars with Fusetsu, Ensetsu, and Rakan in three separate chambers. When Ensetsu is defeated by Rick, he gives him the Mirror of Mercury, stating that Rick may be the fighter for whom they have been waiting. In the final chamber, Rakan tells Rick that the Orb of Courage is part of the Mandara Talisman, which was used to seal up Demonyx a long time ago, and that Rick will have to locate all the broken pieces of the Talisman to seal him up again. While sparring with Rick, Rakan teaches him how to awaken his true power and transform into a Flying Warrior capable of utilizing sacred mirrors to block mystic spells and arcane swords to cast them. Upon defeating Rakan, Rick obtains the Sword of Vijaya.

The line to GTG's biological weapon research laboratory in Peru was disconnected when the office was covered with a mysterious black fog, which Rakan believes must have something to do with the Dark Dimension. Rakan exhorts Rick to enter the tournament in Hong Kong that the president of GTG has decided to hold with the intent of deciding on the investigation party.

Wandering around in Hong Kong, Rick learns that there is a phantom blocking the entrance to the coliseum who can only be banished with the help of a bracelet that can be bought at Shunran's store for coin that can be obtained by fighting Jiangshi and fire-raining ghouls. After Rick pays Shunran, she admits to not having it and instead tells him the password that will convince a certain dragon statue to grant it to an honest man. Rick ventures beyond the waterfall in search of the stone dragon, and finds it in a cave inhabited by a gargoyle who is really a Tusk Soldier in disguise guarding the Sword of Kirik. The dragon grants Rick the bracelet, and tells him that he will obtain the Orb of Wisdom from the phantom when he defeats him. Rick goes back and ventures through another cave guarded by a gargoyle who turns is really a Tusk Soldier in disguise and finds and defeats the phantom, gets the Orb, and enters the tournament. He fights Litron the martial artist, Thornram the kickboxer, Shiro the karate fighter, The Mad Ape the wrestler, and Slugger Sam the boxer. Shiro and Slugger Sam are in fact Tusk soldiers, each guarding a dragma. Rick, Mary Lynn, and Hayato Go are declared the winners of the tournament, and thus the members of the investigation party.

Once the triad is in airspace over Peru, one of Rick's orbs begins to flash, informing him that his traveling companions are Flying Warriors too. He places the Sword of Vijaya on their foreheads, then the three transform and jump out the plane. They fight their way to the jungle village, where they stumble upon the sole survivor of the first investigation party, Greg Cummings, who tells them that the demon Narga has been revived in the ruins at the entrance to the laboratory and joins their party, turning out to be a flying warrior himself. Pepe, who lives in a hut, tells them that they need to find a stone tablet in the ruins and place it in the statue of Narga so that the entrance to the laboratory can open behind the waterfall. The other villagers inform them that Narga cannot be defeated without the Sword of Kan and the Mirror of Venus, and that Maradora, a thief, is trapped in the ruins.

The party fights through more jungle, where they pass a bird who claims to be perched on the Tree of Spirits. Within the ruins, the party finds a talking jar upstairs that turns out to be Maradora, upon whom the spirits cast a spell for stealing their treasures. After bringing him back to the Tree, Rick reminds him of the spell that he needs to cast to turn back into a human. In this way, Rick obtains the Sword of Kan.

The party finds the stone tablet deep within the ruins and brings it to the statue of Narga upstairs, which slides over, revealing the Mirror of Venus. They go back to the waterfall, and fight Narga himself at the entrance to the laboratory. Only Rick's Fire Tornado, which the Sword of Kan affords him, is capable of bringing Narga back from hiding in the Dark Field. Defeating Narga, they go on into the laboratory, where they encounter several Tusk Soldiers and the dead body of the director of GTG. Dargon appears and forces Rick to participate in a second martial arts tournament, with more Tusk Soldiers participating, and Dargon himself defending the title.

After the tournament, the Moonlight Warriors invite the Flying Warriors to battle them in the Dark Dimension, where they have revived Demonyx. At Peking Restaurant in New York's Chinatown, the Flying Warriors meet the Shadow Cult, who are determined to access and root out the Moonlight Warriors, and pick up its young leader, Jimmy Cutler Jr., who turns out to be the fifth Flying Warrior. Jimmy informs the rest of the party that they will need to go deep within a decaying subway station in order to find the portal to the Dark Dimension.

They find the relief key deep within the abandoned subway, and use it to open up the portal to the dark dimension. They fight the Moonlight Warriors, Selenos, Lunatos, Seiros, and Zakros, for deeper access. Because they have through fighting obtained the orbs of Courage, Wisdom, Justice, and Love, as well as the five dragma of the Mandara Talisman, along the way, they are able to fight Demonyx; Jimmy Cutler Jr.'s Meteor Shower is able to force Demonyx to reveal himself; the five Flying Warriors combine to become Dragonlord, and seal Demonyx away until next time; then they head to New York.
