= Little Ninja Brothers =

1989 video game

- North American box art
- Developer(s): Culture Brain
- Publisher(s): Culture Brain
- Composer(s): Akinori Sawa
- Series: Super Chinese
- Platform(s): NES
- Release: JP: May 26, 1989; NA: February 1991; EU: 1991
- Genre(s): Action RPG
- Mode(s): Single-player

Little Ninja Brothers, known in Japan as Super Chinese 2 (スーパーチャイニーズ2), is a 1989 video game developed and published by Culture Brain for the Nintendo Entertainment System in 1989 in Japan and 1991 for the rest of the world. It is the second game in the Super Chinese series.

Little Ninja Brothers is the first game in the Super Chinese series to feature role-playing video game elements, an addition to the series that would continue into the other games. The plot follows two young brothers, Jack and Ryu, attempting to find out the mysterious reason for the invasion of Chinaland.

It was the second game in the series, preceded by Kung-Fu Heroes, and followed up by a sequel Super Ninja Boy, released on the Super NES. There were also two Ninja Boy spin-off games released for the Game Boy in both regions. A manga adaptation of the game was serialized in early issues of video game magazine GamePro. The game was included in a 2004 Game Boy Advance collection titled Super Chinese I+II Advance.

== Release and reception ==
Little Ninja Brothers was released on May 26, 1989 in Japan.

In Biweekly Famicom Tsūshin, the four critics gave the game a five, six, six and four rating each out of a possible ten.
