= Self-deprecation =

Act of devaluing one's self-worth

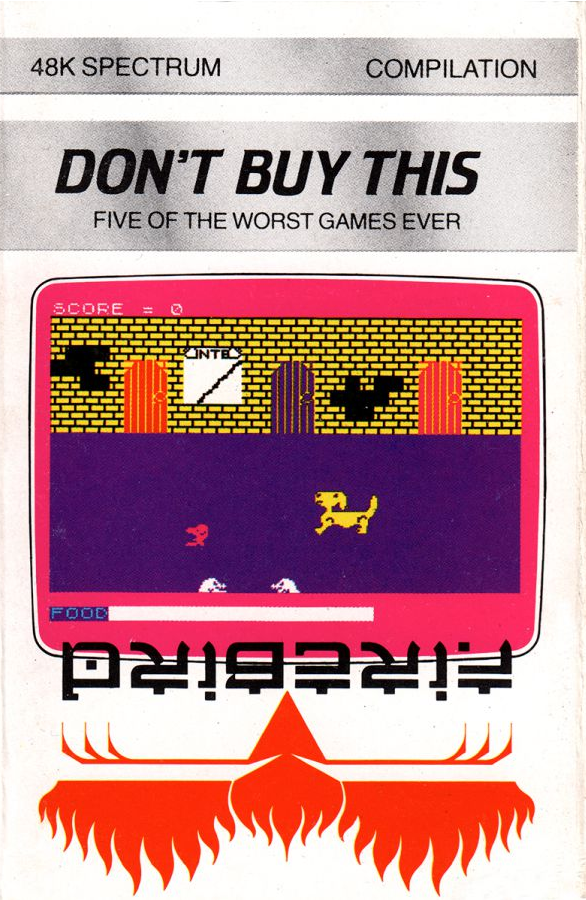
Don't Buy This is a video game, released in Britain where self-deprecation is considered virtuous, that openly markets itself as containing "the worst games ever".

Self-deprecation (originally spelled self-depreciation) is the act of reprimanding oneself by belittling, undervaluing, disparaging oneself, or being excessively modest. It can be used as a way to make complaints, express modesty, invoke optimal reactions or add humour. It may also be used as a way for individuals to appear more likeable and agreeable.

== Purposes ==
=== Self-defence ===
Self-deprecation was recommended by philosophers of Stoicism as a response to insults. Instead of getting defensive, people should join in by insulting themselves even more. Stoics said this will remove the sting from the insult. It will also disappoint the interlocutor because the person failed to show upset in response to words that were supposed to hurt them, thereby reducing the chance that they will try to upset the person in the same way again. People prefer self-criticism over being criticised by others.

However, researchers believe it can have an overall negative effect on users, resulting in them feeling unworthy of praise and undermining their own authority.

=== Likeability ===
Engaging in self-deprecation allows individuals to appear more likeable by showing off their flaws and deflecting praise. People tend to have more negative impressions of individuals who seem boastful and who talk positively about themselves. They are often perceived as arrogant, but this doesn't occur when one describes themselves in a negative way. A person might self-deprecate after achieving something in fear of their accomplishment threatening the self-concept of others. People with higher statuses (e.g. being wealthy, having many accomplishments, being physically attractive) are perceived more positively if they self-deprecate by highlighting their own personal flaws and downplay their successes.

=== Politeness ===
In traditional British English culture, self-deprecation is considered to be an element of modesty. Modesty is considered a virtue, often contrasted to the North American demonstration of self-confidence, often taken for boasting. This is characteristic such as in the United Kingdom, Ireland, Australia and New Zealand, where "blowing one's own trumpet" is frowned upon. In stereotypical English behaviour, belittling oneself means appearing polite by putting someone else first.

=== Humour and comedy ===
Self-deprecating humour can be interpreted differently across cultures. In Britain, self-deprecating jokes are considered a defining feature of British humour, with Comic Relief finding that around 72% of Britons consider making jokes at one's own expense "part of being British". Self-deprecating humour is common throughout the Commonwealth, such as Australia and New Zealand, as well as other countries formerly part of the British Empire, owing to the influence of British culture.

In contrast, self-deprecating humour may be viewed negatively in some Asian countries, such as Japan, where diminishing oneself could be associated with loss of status or "face". However, a 2023 study in the Journal of Pragmatics found that Japanese university students employed self-deprecating humour in initial interactions with peers, noting that the students would "humorously disparage themselves". The social setting, relationship to one's conversational partners, and other contextual factors may influence how appropriate self-deprecating humour is considered in Japan.

Although self-deprecating humour is not considered characteristic of American culture, often contrasted with Britain or Australia, it features heavily in the comedy of many North American comedians such as Rodney Dangerfield, Woody Allen, Nathan Fielder, Don Knotts, and Joan Rivers.

== In social media ==
Since the rise of social media, self-deprecating humour has become increasingly popular on certain social media platforms such as Instagram, X and TikTok, especially among Gen Z and millenials. Self-deprecating jokes frequently mention feeling dead inside, having a mental illness, or blaming oneself for anything bad that happens in life. These posts tend to be more popular because it allows users to not feel alone in not being able to live a perfect life. According to the American Psychological Association, 91% of Gen Z between ages 18–21 in the last month have experienced at least one physical or emotional symptom due to stress. This statistic is the highest rate ever recorded, demonstrating the increase of mental health issues that Gen Z experiences. In return, users turn to self-deprecating memes on social media to cope.

Social media can be public yet personal and has norms most users follow to avoid being criticised. These types of self-deprecating jokes can let people feel free from the pressure of needing to appear perfect. It lets users display their less-desirable traits or habits while preventing feelings of embarrassment.

Boasting on social media, as in real life, is often perceived negatively and is another reason why users gravitate towards self-deprecation to appear more likeable. People also tend to like a person more if positive information about them is presented by a third party rather than from themselves, even if it is the same information. The use of self-deprecating hashtags similarly allows individuals to be perceived as less arrogant and more humorous.

== See also ==
- Guilty pleasure
- Ingratiation
- Peer pressure
- Self-criticism
- Self-hatred
- Social awkwardness
- Toxic positivity
