= Flying Dragon =

1997 video game

- North American Nintendo 64 cover art
- Developer: Culture Brain
- Publishers: JP: Culture Brain; NA: Natsume Inc.
- Producer: Yukio Tanaka
- Designers: Tsukasa Shiina; Hitomi Kawahara; Keiko Mashiba
- Programmers: Akira Tachibana; Seiji Masuda
- Artists: Takumi Hidaka; Ko Kurosawa
- Composer: Akinori Sawa
- Platform: Nintendo 64
- Release: JP: December 18, 1997; NA: October 14, 1998; EU: July 25, 1999
- Genres: Fighting, role-playing
- Modes: Single-player, multiplayer

Flying Dragon, known in Japan as Hiryū no Ken Twin (飛龍の拳ツイン, Hiryū no Ken Tsuin; "Fist of the Flying Dragon Twin"), is a fighting game with role-playing elements that was developed by Culture Brain and released for the Nintendo 64 in 1998. Part of the Hiryū no Ken series, it was published in Japan by Culture Brain, and by Natsume Inc. in North America and Europe.

The game's SD mode features a character progression system, in which characters advance in levels as they become more experienced, and players collect credits and treasure items to equip characters with. It had a sequel a year later, titled S.D. Hiryu no Ken Densetsu.

Flying Dragon is also the name of a NES game released by Culture Brain in 1989, which is part of the same series.

== Characters ==
The game consists of two different fighting modes, though the two share many common characters.

=== SD version ===
- Ryuhi is a hot-blooded fighter, a leader of warriors and an expert with Kung Fu. Ryuhi's home country is China and his fighting style is Kung Fu. Ryuhi is well known for being the main protagonist of the Hiryu No Ken series, due to the fact that the main storyline of Hiryu No Ken is often focused around him and that he also serves as the leader of the "Dragon Warriors".
- Hayato – this calm, quiet, gifted warrior is familiar with all types of fighting styles. Hayato's home country is Japan and his fighting style is Kobujutsu. Hayato is best known for being Ryuhi's friendly rival and a member of the "Dragon Warriors".
- Shouryu is a supernatural ghost hunter and uses ESP. He is currently training in Mexico. Shouryu's home country is México and his fighting style is a mix of Martial Arts and Lucha Libre. Shouryu is best known for being a member of the "Dragon Warriors". It is hinted by their pre-battle quotes that Shouryu and Suzaku know each other from the past.
- Suzaku – a mysterious evil man, set on revenge, plans on conquering the world. His home country is the Underworld and his fighting style is Kung Fu. Suzaku is well known for being the right-hand man of Ryumaou, the series' main antagonist.
- Wiler – a warrior who is strong and reliable. He uses Martial Arts learned in the US Army. His home country is the United States and his fighting style is a mix of Martial Arts and Amateur Wrestling. Wiler is also known for being a member of the "Dragon Warriors"
- Yuka – a master with "Aiki-Jyujyutsu" with telekinesis, she can throw any opponent. Yuka's home country is Japan and her fighting style is Jyujyutsu.
- Robo no Hana – the Yokozuna of Robot Sumo, who dreams of becoming the best hero in the universe. He has no home country and his fighting style is Robot Sumo. Robot Sumo is held on the distant planet of Dousokui, which probably means that Robo no Hana is an alien visiting Earth. Robo no Hana had originated from the Super Chinese series, in which he appears in Super Chinese Fighter for the Super Famicom.
- Powers – the top wrestler of the NCW, he plans on being the strongest in the world. His home country is the United States and his fighting style is Pro Wrestling. His physical appearance makes him resemble the former professional wrestler The Ultimate Warrior.
- Bokuchin (unlockable character) – possibly the most mysterious character of the bunch. His physical appearance makes him look like a doll brought to life. He has no known fighting style, home country, or even his own stage. He also has the most limited moveset of all the characters. Like Robo no Hana, Bokuchin had originated from the Super Chinese series, first appearing in Super Chinese 3 for the Famicom.
- Ryumaou (unlockable character) – he is usually the main boss of both the SD and the Virtual modes. He rules the Underworld as the Devil King and is one of the fiercest and dangerous characters in the game. The playable Ryumaou is a clone created by Shin Ryumaou, who is the final boss.
- Shin Ryumaou (boss; non-playable)

=== Virtual version ===
- Ryuhi
- Hayato
- Shouryu
- Red Falcon – this cruel warrior wins by only attacking weak points, like a falcon. Red Falcon's home country is unknown and his fighting style is Kenpo. Red Falcon may actually be Suzaku under a different alias, due to both having similar outfits, similar movesets, the same hair color and even the same scar in their faces. Suzaku is also the name of one of the 4 mystic beasts in Chinese mythology. Suzaku is the vermillion bird, or "Red Falcon".
- Min Min – an elegant female warrior who is successor to her father's "Kochouken". Min Min's home country is China and her fighting style is Kung Fu. Min Min is also a member of the "Dragon Warriors".
- Kate – an elite international police officer who is the all U.S.A. Kickboxing champion. Kate's home country is Sweden and her fighting style is Kick Boxing.
- Raima is the cyborg ninja who acts in secret to destroy the organization of the darkness. Raima's home country is Japan and his fighting style is Ninjutsu.
- Gengai – the head of Shourinji and Ryuhi's sensei, he is the ultimate Kung Fu master. Gengai's home country is China and his fighting style is Kung Fu.
- Ryumaou (unlockable character)
- Shin Ryumaou (boss; non-playable)

== S.D. Hiryu no Ken Densetsu ==
S.D. Hiryu no Ken Densetsu
- Developer: Culture Brain
- Publisher: Culture Brain
- Platform: Nintendo 64
- Release: JP: January 29, 1999
- Genres: Fighting, role-playing video game
- Modes: Single-player, multiplayer

An updated version of the game, entitled SD Hiryū no Ken Densetsu (SD飛龍の拳伝説, "SD Legend of the Fist of the Flying Dragon"), was released in Japan only, adding more characters (such as Jack, Ryu, and Gofire from the Super Chinese series), items and a new gameplay mode. It also removed the more realistic "Virtual Mode", favoring the super deformed "Quest Mode".

Playable characters are Ryuhi, Hayato, Min Min, Wiler, Shouryu, Yuka, Suzaku, Powers, Robo No Hana, Bokuchin (unlockable), Jack, Ryu, Raima, E. Quaker, Ellie, Gofire, Ryumaou (unlockable).
