= Super Chinese Fighter =

1995 video game

- Box art
- Developer: Culture Brain
- Publisher: Culture Brain
- Series: Super Chinese
- Platform: Super Famicom
- Release: JP: January 3, 1995
- Genre: Fighting
- Modes: Single-player, multiplayer

Super Chinese Fighter (Note: Japanese: スーパーチャイニーズファイター, Hepburn: Sūpāchainīzufaitā) is a 1995 fighting game. It was developed and published by Culture Brain for the Super Famicom exclusively in Japan. It is part of the Super Chinese series, but is not in the main series of the games. Fighter allows players to fight in fighting game battles using characters from the Super Chinese games, including Jack and Ryu.

This game is the first Super Chinese Fighter game. Two others, Super Chinese Fighter GB and Super Chinese Fighter EX, were released after this game, although none of these games were released in North America.

== Characters ==
- Jack
- Ryu
- Lin Lin
- Poi
- Donchyu
- Robo No Hana
- Astro Joe
- Genziro
- Kamanchyi
- Gofire
- Syuba
- Bokuchin
- Kyon2see

== Release and reception ==
Reception

Review score
Publication	Score
Famitsu	6/10, 6/10, 5/10, 6/10 (Note: Each of the four reviewers in Famitsu scored the game on a ten point scale)

Super Chinese Fighter was released in Japan for the Super Famicom on January 3, 1995.

== Trivia ==
Jack, Ryu, Robo No Hana, Gofire, and Bokuchin would go on to cross over in the Hiryu No Ken series, in which Robo No Hana and Bokuchin would appear in Flying Dragon (SD Hiryu No Ken Twin) for the Nintendo 64 while Jack, Ryu, and Gofire would later appear with the two in the game's Japan-only sequel SD Hiryu No Ken Densetsu.

== See also ==
- 1995 in video games
- List of Super Nintendo Entertainment System games
