= Hiryū no Ken =

- Genre: Fighting
- Developer: Culture Brain
- Publishers: JPN; Taito; Taiyo System; Culture Brain; NA; Data East USA; Memetron; Kitcorp; Culture Brain; Natsume Inc.
- Platforms: Arcade, Family Computer, Super Famicom, Game Boy, PlayStation, Nintendo 64, Game Boy Color, Game Boy Advance
- First release: Hokuha Syourin Hiryū no Ken; 1985
- Latest release: Hiryū no Ken Retsuden GB; December 22, 2000
- Spin-offs: SD Hiryū no Ken series

Hiryū no Ken (飛龍の拳, lit. "Fist of the Flying Dragon") is a series of fighting video games dating back to 1985. They have been developed by Culture Brain and released for the arcades, NES, Super NES, Game Boy, Game Boy Color, PlayStation and Nintendo 64 platforms.

== Games ==
The following is a list of games released in the series.

Game	Details
Shanghai Kid Original release date(s): JP: June 1985; NA: November 1985	Release years by system: 1985 - Arcade
Shanghai Kid Original release date(s): JP: June 1985; NA: November 1985	Notes: Released in Japan as Hokuha Syourin Hiryū no Ken (lit. "North Faction Shaolin - Fist of the Flying Dragon").; First game in the Hiryū no Ken series.; First and only Hiryū no Ken arcade game.
Flying Dragon: The Secret Scroll Original release date(s): JP: February 14, 1987; NA: August 1989	Release years by system: 1987 - NES
Flying Dragon: The Secret Scroll Original release date(s): JP: February 14, 1987; NA: August 1989	Notes: Released in Japan as Hiryū no Ken: Ougi no Sho (lit. "Fist of the Flying Dragon: The Book of Mystery").; The first Hiryū no Ken NES game.; The first Hiryū no Ken title with side-scrolling action and RPG elements.
Hiryū no Ken II: Dragon no Tsubasa Original release date(s): JP: July 29, 1988	Release years by system: 1988 - Family Computer
Hiryū no Ken II: Dragon no Tsubasa Original release date(s): JP: July 29, 1988	Notes: Released in Japan as Hiryū no Ken II: Dragon no Tsubasa (lit. "Fist of the Flying Dragon 2: Dragon's Wings").; The first title to be released only in Japan.; Some exact parts of this were combined with its successor Hiryu no Ken III: 5 Nin no Ryū Senshi to create Flying Warriors for North American release.
Hiryu no Ken III: 5 Nin no Ryū Senshi Original release date(s): JP: July 6, 1990	Release years by system: 1990 - NES
Hiryu no Ken III: 5 Nin no Ryū Senshi Original release date(s): JP: July 6, 1990	Notes: Released in Japan as Hiryu no Ken III: 5 Nin no Ryū Senshi (lit. "Fist of the Flying Dragon: 5 Dragon Warriors").; Some exact parts of this were combined with its predecessor Hiryū no Ken II: Dragon no Tsubasa to create Flying Warriors for North American release.
Fighting Simulator: 2-in-1: Flying Warriors Original release date(s): JP: December 22, 1990; NA: April 1992; EU: 1992	Release years by system: 1990 – Game Boy
Fighting Simulator: 2-in-1: Flying Warriors Original release date(s): JP: December 22, 1990; NA: April 1992; EU: 1992	Notes: Released in Japan as Hiryū no Ken Gaiden (lit. "Fist of the Flying Dragon Gaiden").; The first Hiryū no Ken title to appear on a Nintendo handheld.; The first Hiryū no Ken Game Boy game.; The first gaiden title in the series.; North American version is a successor of Flying Warriors.
Hiryū no Ken Special: Fighting Wars Original release date(s): JP: June 21, 1991	Release years by system: 1991 - Family Computer
Hiryū no Ken Special: Fighting Wars Original release date(s): JP: June 21, 1991	Notes: Released in Japan as Hiryū no Ken Special: Fighting Wars (lit. "Fist of the Flying Dragon Special: Fighting Wars").; The first title in the "Special" series.; The game was planned to be released in North America under the title Fighting Simulator: World Champ, but was canceled.
Ultimate Fighter Original release date(s): JP: July 31, 1992; NA: June 1994	Release years by system: 1992 – Super Famicom
Ultimate Fighter Original release date(s): JP: July 31, 1992; NA: June 1994	Notes: Released in Japan as Hiryū no Ken S: Golden Fighter (lit. "Fist of the Flying Dragon S: Golden Fighter"). The S is short for "Special".; The first Hiryū no Ken Super NES game.; North American version is a successor of Flying Warriors.
Hiryū no Ken S: Hyper Version Original release date(s): JP: December 11, 1992	Release years by system: 1992 – Super Famicom
Hiryū no Ken S: Hyper Version Original release date(s): JP: December 11, 1992	Notes: Released in Japan as Hiryū no Ken S: Hyper Version (lit. "Fist of the Flying Dragon S: Hyper Version"). The S is short for "Special".; Revision of Ultimate Fighter.
SD Hiryū no Ken Original release date(s): JP: June 17, 1994; NA: Cancelled	Release years by system: 1994 – Super Famicom
SD Hiryū no Ken Original release date(s): JP: June 17, 1994; NA: Cancelled	Notes: The first SD title in the series.
SD Hiryū no Ken Gaiden Original release date(s): JP: April 14, 1995	Release years by system: 1995 – Game Boy
SD Hiryū no Ken Gaiden Original release date(s): JP: April 14, 1995	Notes: Released only in Japan as SD Hiryū no Ken Gaiden (lit. "SD Fist of the Flying Dragon Gaiden").
SD Hiryū no Ken Gaiden 2 Original release date(s): JP: September 27, 1996	Release years by system: 1996 – Game Boy
SD Hiryū no Ken Gaiden 2 Original release date(s): JP: September 27, 1996	Notes: Released only in Japan as SD Hiryū no Ken Gaiden 2 (lit. "SD Fists of the Flying Dragon Gaiden 2").
Virtual Hiryū no Ken Original release date(s): JP: July 17, 1997	Release years by system: 1997 – PlayStation
Virtual Hiryū no Ken Original release date(s): JP: July 17, 1997	Notes: Released only in Japan as Virtual Hiryū no Ken (lit. "Virtual Fist of the Flying Dragon").; The first title to be rendered in 3D graphics.; The first and only Hiryū no Ken PlayStation game.
Flying Dragon Original release date(s): JP: December 18, 1997; NA: July 31, 1998; EU: July 25, 1999	Release years by system: 1997 – Nintendo 64
Flying Dragon Original release date(s): JP: December 18, 1997; NA: July 31, 1998; EU: July 25, 1999	Notes: Released in Japan as Hiryū no Ken Twin (lit. "Twin Fists of the Flying Dragon").; The first SD title to be rendered in 3D graphics.; The first Hiryū no Ken Nintendo 64 game.
SD Hiryū no Ken Densetsu Original release date(s): JP: January 29, 1999	Release years by system: 1999 – Nintendo 64
SD Hiryū no Ken Densetsu Original release date(s): JP: January 29, 1999	Notes: Released only in Japan as SD Hiryū no Ken Densetsu (lit. "SD Legend of the Fist of the Flying Dragon").; Featuring characters from Culture Brain's Super Chinese video game franchise.
SD Hiryū no Ken EX Original release date(s): JP: April 30, 1999	Release years by system: 1999 – Game Boy Color
SD Hiryū no Ken EX Original release date(s): JP: April 30, 1999	Notes: Released only in Japan as SD Hiryū no Ken EX (lit. "SD Fist of the Flying Dragon EX").; The first Hiryū no Ken Game Boy Color game.
Hiryū no Ken Retsuden GB Original release date(s): JP: December 22, 2000	Release years by system: 2000 – Game Boy Color
Hiryū no Ken Retsuden GB Original release date(s): JP: December 22, 2000	Notes: Released only in Japan as Hiryū no Ken Retsuden GB.; Side-scrolling platforming game with fighting elements.

=== Other/cancelled games ===
Game	Details
Flying Warriors Original release date(s): NA: February 1991	Release years by system: 1991– NES
Flying Warriors Original release date(s): NA: February 1991	Notes: Released only in North America as Flying Warriors.; A mixture of Hiryū no Ken II: Dragon no Tsubasa and Hiryu no Ken III: 5 Nin no Ryuu Senshi.
Hiryū no Ken Collection Original release date(s): WW: April 18, 2026	Release years by system: 2026- Steam
Hiryū no Ken Collection Original release date(s): WW: April 18, 2026	Notes: A compilation containing the first four Family Computer Hiryū no Ken titles plus their two English NES counterparts Flying Dragon: The Secret Scroll and Flying Warriors.
Hiryū no Ken I+II PLUS Original release date(s): Cancelled	Release years by system: Cancelled
Hiryū no Ken I+II PLUS Original release date(s): Cancelled	Notes: A two-game compilation that includes the first two Family Computer Hiryū no Ken titles was originally planned for release on the Game Boy Advance, but the project was discontinued.
Virtual Hiryū no Ken Dash Original release date(s): Cancelled	Release years by system: Cancelled
Virtual Hiryū no Ken Dash Original release date(s): Cancelled	Notes: A revision of Virtual Hiryū no Ken that was originally planned for release on the PlayStation, but the project was discontinued.
