= Hiryu =

Hiryū (Japanese: 飛龍), meaning "Flying Dragon" may refer to:

- Japanese aircraft carrier Hiryū
- Mitsubishi Ki-67 Hiryū, Japanese Army bomber
- Strider Hiryu, a ninja-like video game character
- Flying Dragon, a video game series known as Hiryu no Ken in Japan
- Trademark of Yomeishu that is the most traditional Japanese medical liquor. The trademark was given by the shōgun Ieyasu Tokugawa.

== See also ==
- Flying Dragon (disambiguation)
