= Hamster (disambiguation) =

A hamster is a rodent.

Hamster may also refer to:

== Species of hamsters ==
- Golden hamster, a rodent native to Syria and Anatolia
- European hamster, a rodent native to Eurasia
- Chinese hamster, a rodent native to China and Mongolia
- Mongolian hamster, a rodent native to Mongolia and China
- Romanian hamster, a rodent native to Bulgaria and Romania
- Dwarf hamster (disambiguation), a small rodent, one of several species

== Entertainment ==
- The Hamsters, a British band
- The Hamster, a name used by Richard Hammond (born 1969), an English television presenter
- Hamster Corporation, a video game publisher
- Hamster Theatre, an American musical group
- Bounty Hamster, a British science fiction cartoon series
- The Hamster Wheel, an Australian television series
- Hamster Monogatari 64, a Nintendo game
- Hamsterz Life, a Nintendo game
- xHamster, stylized as XHAMSTER, a pornographic video sharing and streaming website, based in Limassol, Cyprus.

== Other ==
- Hamster wheel, a rotating exercise machine
- The Hamster Dance, an alternative name for Hampster Dance, an internet meme
