= Super Chinese World 2 =

1993 video game

- Cover art
- Developer: Culture Brain
- Publisher: Culture Brain
- Designer: Yukio Tanaka
- Programmers: Yuzuru Nanbara; Ryu Hayakawa
- Composer: Akinori Sawa
- Series: Super Chinese
- Platform: Super Famicom
- Release: JP: October 29, 1993
- Genre: Action RPG
- Modes: Single-player, multiplayer

Super Chinese World 2: Uchū Ichi Butō Taikai (スーパーチャイニーズワールド２ 宇宙一武闘大会) is a Japanese-only action RPG developed by Culture Brain. It is the second SNES Super Chinese game, being a sequel to Super Ninja Boy, which was released in North America.

Contrary to its predecessor, it doesn't feature any traditional turn-based battles, but a couple of platforming sections still remain. Jack and Ryu are now travelling between different planets to defeat some alien invaders, who kidnapped the world leaders. The battle system was also greatly improved. Jack and Ryu now have a lot of new attacks and even a few different skills (although they still share levels and items), they can turn into giant ninjas in order to cast the most advanced spells and it is possible to use weapons or spells without going to the menu. A fighting mode has also been added, allowing to play with many other characters than the heroes.

== Release and reception ==
Reception

Review score
Publication	Score
Famitsu	6/10, 6/10, 6/10, 4/10

Super Chinese World 2: Uchū Ichi Butō Taikai was released in Japan on October 29, 1993 for the Super Famicom.

Two reviewers in Famicom Tsūshin said that the action-oriented elements of the game were better than the role-playing game parts. One reviewer said fans of the previous games would enjoy this one, while another said the game was so similar to the other games and just incorporated whatever was currently popular into the game and still had all the rough production qualities of the previous Super Chinese games. A review in Hippon Super! echoed this saying its the same game as always only with fighting game mechanics added due to the boom in popularity of the genre. They found the fight game mode to be poor.
