= Super Chinese World 3 =

1995 video game

- Cover art
- Developer: Culture Brain
- Publisher: Culture Brain
- Designer: Yukio Tanaka
- Programmer: Ryu Hayakawa
- Artist: Masayuki Numahide
- Composer: Akinori Sawa
- Series: Super Chinese
- Platform: Super Famicom
- Release: JP: December 22, 1995
- Genre: Role-playing game
- Modes: Single-player, multiplayer

Super Chinese World 3 (Note: Japanese: スーパーチャイニーズワールド３ ~超次元大作戦~, Hepburn: Sūpāchainīzuwārudo 3 ~ chō jigen dai sakusen ~; lit. Super Chinese World 3: Super Dimensional Operation) is a role-playing game from Culture Brain for the Super Famicom. In this game, the player lets you choose between two forms of gameplay, with one more traditional menu-based selection for RPG battles, and the other being more action-oriented.

The game was released on December 22, 1995. In Famicom Tsūshin, it was critiqued for having poor gameplay in either format of RPG and low-quality graphics.

== Gameplay ==
Super Chinese World 3 lets players choose between two styles of role-playing game (RPG). The first is a style based on menu selections to perform attacks, the other is more action RPG-oriented.

== Release and reception ==
Reception

Review score
| Publication | Score |
|---|---|
| Famitsu | 5/10, 3/10, 5/10, 4/10 |

Super Chinese World 3 was released in Japan for the Super Famicom on December 22, 1995.

In the Japanese video game magazine Famicom Tsūshin, the four reviewers complimented the idea of being able to switch between a menu-based RPG-system and an action-oriented RPG, with a number of the reviewers saying both gameplay elements felt under-developed. The reviews found the graphics to be poor quality, with one reviewer specifically highlighting the map screens as poor quality while another said the graphics resembled a Famicom game. Other comments involved the menu-interface being poor, that the game was still using password systems, with one reviewer concluding that it was shocking that this game came out in 1995.
