= Super Chinese Fighter GB =

1996 video game

- Cover art
- Developer(s): Culture Brain
- Publisher(s): Culture Brain
- Series: Super Chinese
- Platform(s): Game Boy
- Release: JP: December 28, 1996
- Genre(s): 2D fighting
- Mode(s): Single-player, multiplayer

Super Chinese Fighter GB (スーパーチャイニーズ Fighter GB) is a 2D fighting video game for the Game Boy released by Culture Brain in 1996. It is part of the Super Chinese series.

Like Super Chinese Fighter for the SNES, Fighter GB allows players to participate in fighting game battles using characters from the Super Chinese games, including Jack and Ryu. The game has 12 different fighters. Players can use "super techniques" for their special attacks and block them using their "super defense". This game has a high level of animation and combat moves for a Game Boy game and it is possible to deliver combos that do more than 10 hits of damage.
