= Super Baseball Simulator 1.000 =

1991 video game

- North American cover art
- Developer: Culture Brain
- Publisher: Culture Brain
- Platform: Super NES
- Release: JP: July 12, 1991; NA: December 1991
- Genre: Sports (baseball)
- Modes: Single-player, multiplayer

Super Baseball Simulator 1.000 is a 1991 sports video game by Culture Brain for the Super NES that is the sequel to the NES game Baseball Simulator 1.000. This game is called Super Ultra Baseball (スーパーウルトラベースボール) in Japan.

In the game, there are three baseball leagues: Atlantic, Northern, and Ultra. Each league has six teams. In the Ultra League, pitchers and batters have special power-ups that boost their abilities which gives the game a surrealistic feel that is rare in the sports genre. Players can even create their own baseball teams and assign special moves to the players that they name themselves. The game can be played in exhibition mode and season mode.

In May 2021, Super Baseball Simulator 1.000 was added to the Nintendo Classics service.

== Baseball Simulator series ==
These baseball titles included some form of "Super League" where pitchers and batters would have special abilities.

- Baseball Simulator 1.000 (1989, NES), also known as Choujin Ultra Baseball.
- Super Baseball Simulator 1.000 (1991, Super NES), also known as Super Ultra Baseball.
- Ultra Baseball Jitsumeiban (1992, SNES), NPB licensed.
- Super Ultra Baseball 2 (1994, SNES)
- Ultra Baseball Jitsumeiban 2 (1994, SNES), NPB licensed.
- Ultra Baseball Jitsumeiban 3 (1995, SNES), NPB licensed.

== Reviews ==
Famitsu gave the game a score of 25/40.
