= Gamesmaster =

Gamesmaster may refer to:

- GamesMaster, a British television show that ran from 1992 to 1998, dedicated to video games, revived in 2021
- "The Gamesmaster", an episode of season one of G.I.Joe : A Real American Hero
- GamesMaster (magazine), a spinoff of the above television show
- Gamesmaster (comics), a character in the Marvel Universe
- GamesMaster International, a magazine dedicated to roleplaying games
- "The Gamesmaster", stage name for American professional wrestler Kevin Sullivan (born 1949)

== See also ==
- Gamemaster (disambiguation)
