= Cassette 50 =

- Acorn Electron cover
- Developer: Various
- Publisher: Cascade Games
- Platforms: Acorn Electron, Amstrad CPC, Apple II, Atari 8-bit, BBC Micro, Commodore 64, Dragon 32, Oric-1, Oric Atmos, VIC-20, ZX81, ZX Spectrum
- Release: 1983
- Genre: Various
- Mode: Single-player

Cassette 50 (released in Spain as Galaxy 50 - 50 Excitantes Juegos) is a compilation of games published by Cascade Games in 1983 for multiple 8-bit home computers. It was promoted based on the quantity of games included, all of which were programmed in BASIC and were of poor quality. According to the instructions, "the games will provide many hours of entertainment for all the family at a fraction of the cost of other computer games". The compilation was heavily advertised in home computer magazines. Buyers received a Timex digital calculator watch with each purchase.

In an interview, Matthew Lewis, the author of Galaxy Defence, said he wrote the game when he was 14 and submitted it in response to a small, anonymous ad in a local newspaper. He was paid £10 for his game, but he had to give up all rights to it. Galaxy Defence took 12 hours to code and the graphics were done by his father, Ernest Lewis.

== Content ==
The games featured differed depending on the platform, all of which were written in BASIC. Some like Star Trek and Maze Eater appeared on all versions. Others like Lunar Lander were ports or clones of very early or popular games, while others were sourced from independent developers. Some games that had the same title were entirely different depending on which version. Some games also had playability issues.

=== Acorn Electron / Commodore 64 / Dragon 32 / Oric-1 / Oric Atmos / ZX81 ===
- Attacker
- Barrel Jump
- Black Hole
- Boggles
- Cannonball Battle
- Derby Dash
- Do Your Sums
- Dynamite
- Exchange
- Force Field
- Galactic Attack
- Galactic Dog Fight
- Ghosts
- Hangman
- High Rise
- Inferno
- Intruder
- Ivasive Action
- Jet Flight
- Jet Mobile
- Lunar Landing
- Maze Eater
- Motorway
- Nim
- Noughts and Crosses
- Old Bones
- Orbitter
- Overtake
- Parachute
- Phaser
- Planets
- Plasma Bolt
- Pontoon
- Psion Attack
- Radar Landing
- Rats
- Rocket Launch
- Sitting Target
- Ski Jump
- Smash the Windows
- Space Mission
- Space Search
- Space Ship
- Star Trek
- Submarines
- Tanker
- The Force
- Thin Ice
- Tunnel Escape
- Universe

The games Exchange and The Force, although listed on the inlay, are missing from the Acorn Electron version, meaning only 48 games actually appeared on the cassette. There was a second release of the Dragon 32 version which had different versions of some of the games. Tunnel Escape on the C64 version is credited as such in the game's inlay but is credited as "Escape or Bust" in the actual game.

=== Amstrad CPC ===
- 3-D Maze
- Attacker
- Backgammon
- Colony-9
- Craps
- Creepy Crawley
- Cylons
- Day at the Races
- Dragona Maze
- Draughts
- Dungeon Adventure
- Dynamite
- Evasive Action
- Exchange
- Fantasy Land
- Fighter Command
- Fireman Rescue
- Ghosts
- Handicap Golf
- Hangman
- High Rise
- Hopping Herbert
- Inferno
- Intruder
- Jet Flight
- Lunar Lander
- Maze Eater
- Motorway
- Nemesis IV
- Noughts & Crosses
- Planets
- Play Your Cards Right
- Pontoon Bet
- Rally 3000
- Rats
- Rush Hour Attack
- Royal Rescue
- Sitting Target
- Solit
- Space Base
- Space Mission
- Space Pod Rescue
- Space Ship
- Star Trek
- The Kings Orb
- Three Card Brag
- Timebomb
- Trucking
- Whirly
- Yamzee

=== Atari 8-bit ===
- Attacker
- Baby Chase!
- Barrel Jump!
- Black Hole
- Boggles
- Cannon Ball Battle
- Derby Dash
- Defend the Fortress
- Do Your Sums
- Dynamite
- Exchange
- Galactic Attack
- Ghosts
- Hangman
- High Rise
- Inferno!
- Intruder!
- Ivasive Action
- Jet Fighter
- Jetmobile
- Lunar Landing
- Maze Eater
- Motorway
- Nim
- Noughts and Crosses
- Old Bones
- Orbitter
- Overtake
- Parachute
- Phaser
- Planets
- Plasma Bolt
- Pontoon
- Zion Attack
- Rabbit Raid
- Radar Lander
- Rats
- Rocket Launch
- Sea Alert
- Sitting Target
- Ski Jump
- Smash the Windows
- Space Mission
- Space Search
- Space Ship
- Star Trek
- Tanker
- The Force
- Tunnel Escape
- Universe

=== BBC Micro ===
- Attacker
- Barrel Jump
- Black Hole
- Boggles
- Cannon Ball
- Derby Dash
- Dice Thrower
- Dynamite
- Exchange
- Force Field
- Galactic Attack
- Galactic Dogfight
- Ghosts
- Hangman
- High Rise
- Inferno
- Intruder
- Ivasive Action
- Jet Flight
- Jet Mobile
- Lunar Landing
- Maze Eater
- Motorway
- Nim
- Noughts and Crosses
- Old Bones
- Orbitter
- Overtake
- Parachute
- Phaser
- Planets
- Plasma Bolt
- Pontoon
- Psion Attack
- Radar Landing
- Rats
- Rocket Launch
- Sitting Target
- Ski Jump
- Smash the Windows
- Space Mission
- Space Search
- Space Ship
- Star Trek
- Submarines
- Tanker
- The Force
- Thin Ice
- Tunnel Escape
- Universe

The game Dice Thrower is mistakenly displayed in the inlay as "Do Your Sums" .

=== VIC-20 ===
- Balloon Dodger
- Bank Raid
- Bomber
- Cupid's Arrow
- Derby Dash
- Do Your Sums
- Dustman Dan
- Exchange
- Flesh Eaters
- Force Field
- Galactic Dogfight
- Golf
- Grid Racer
- Hangman
- Houses
- Intruder
- Jet Flight
- Jet Mobile
- Knight Out
- Krazy
- Lite Bikes
- Lunar Lander
- Maze Eater
- Meteoroids
- Minotaur's Treasure
- Mole Hole
- Motorway
- Nim
- Noughts & Crosses
- One Armed Bandit
- Orbitter
- PanAttack
- Planetoids
- Plasma Bolt
- Pontoon
- Radar Landing
- Sentinel-1
- Ski Run
- Skull Castle
- Soccer
- Space Search
- Spaceship
- Star Falls
- Star Trek
- Submarines
- Super Hi-Low
- Super Vaders
- Thin Ice
- Three Card Brag
- Turtle Bridge

=== ZX Spectrum ===
- Alien #27
- Alien Attack #10
- Attacker #49
- Barrel Jump #48
- Basketball #3
- Blitz #42
- Boggles #9
- Bowls #33
- Breakout #5
- Cargo #28
- Cars #22
- Cavern #25
- Crusher #6
- Cypher #46
- Dragon's Gold #36
- Field #35
- Fishing Mission #43
- Frogger #4
- Galaxy Defence #45
- Inferno #38
- Jet Mobile #47
- Labyrinth #15
- Laser #26
- Lunar Lander #11
- Martian Knock Out #8
- Mazer Eater #12
- Microtrap #13
- Motorway #14
- Munch #32
- Muncher #1
- Mystical Diamonds #44
- Nim #39
- Orbit #31
- Pinball #24
- Race Track #17
- Raiders #34
- Sketch Pad #41
- Ski Jump #2
- Ski Run #18
- Skittles #16
- Solar Ship #20
- Space Mission #50
- Space Search #37
- Star Trek #7
- Stomper #23
- Tanks #19
- Ten Pins #21
- The Race #29
- The Skull #30
- Voyager #40

The number with the '#' symbol represents the order in which the games appear on the tape.

Star Trek is shown in the cassette booklet as Startrek and Jet Mobile as Jetmobile.

== Reception ==
The games, almost without exception written in BASIC, were deemed to be of poor quality. They have been described as "so bad it caused physical discomfort", "beyond awful", and "a piece of crap collection". The poor quality of the games inspired the annual Crap Games Competitions (for example the comp.sys.sinclair Crap Games Competition and the C64 Crap Game Compo) and a now-defunct site reviewing bad games.

== See also ==
- List of video games notable for negative reception
- Don't Buy This
- Action 52
- Caltron 6 in 1
