= Ninja Boy =

1990 video game

- Developer: Culture Brain
- Series: Super Chinese
- Platform: Game Boy
- Release: JP: April 20, 1990; NA: November 1990
- Genre: Action
- Mode: Single-player

Ninja Boy (Note: Japanese: スーパーチャイニーズランド, Hepburn: Sūpāchainīzurando; lit. 'Super Chinese Land') is a 1990 action video game that was developed and published by Culture Brain for the Game Boy.

The game is set in Kung-Fu World where the Yoma Clan have captured a princess. The player controls the ninja Jack, who seeks out across the various lands to rescue her.

== Gameplay ==
Ninja Boy is a single-player action game with an overhead point-of-view. The player can control their character of Ryu in all directions. The game is set across eight worlds with unique themes such as forests, volcanoes, caves and fortresses. After the player has beaten a certain number of enemies, you can move on to the next stage.

Jack can punch, kick various enemies as well as collect power-ups and additional weapons to battle the enemies. Each area is divided into three stages. The number of enemies increase as the player progresses through the game.

== Development and release ==
Ninja Boy was developed by Culture Brain. The game features similar gameplay to Culture Brain's earlier game Chinese Hero (1986) for the Nintendo Entertainment System (NES).

Ninja Boy was released for the Game Boy in Japan on April 20, 1990. It was released in the United States by Culture Brain USA in November 1990. Along with Ninja Boy 2 (1991) and Super Chinese Land 3 (1995), it was released in a video game compilation Sūpāchainīzurando 1 ･ 2 ･ 3 (Note: スーパーチャイニーズランド1･2･3; lit. 'Super Chinese Land 1・2・3') for the console on September 13, 1996 in Japan.

== Reception ==
Reception

Review score
Publication	Score
Famicom Hisshoubon	2.5/5

The two reviewers in Famicom Hisshoubon compared the game to the Famicom version of Chinese Hero (1986). While one reviewer said the original game was still popular in the area and that it featured cute characters, they found the controls clunky in this version. The other reviewer said that it was even more simple than the NES counterpart and questioned whether it had any advantages on being on the Game Boy.

== See also ==
- List of Game Boy games
