= Super Chinese Land 3 =

1995 video game

- Series: Super Chinese
- Platform: Game Boy
- Release: JP: January 13, 1995
- Genres: Role-playing, action
- Modes: Single-player, multiplayer

Super Chinese Land 3 (Note: Japanese: スーパーチャイニーズランド３, Hepburn: Sūpāchainīzurando San) is a 1995 video game for the Game Boy. It is the third game in the Game Boy series, which was a spin-off of the Super Chinese series which began in 1984.

In the game, the two ninjas must stop monsters that escaped when a magical seal was opened. As in the previous games, it is a role-playing video game that becomes an action game when the players enter battles. The game received poor reviews in Famicom Tsūshin who cited poor quality gameplay and controls during the fight scenes as well as low quality graphics.

== Background and development ==
In 1984, the Tokyo-based studio Culture Brain started a series on the Family Computer (Famicom) called Super Chinese. This led to a spin-off series on the Game Boy called Super Chinese Land. In the Western world, the first game in this series is called Ninja Boy (1990) which was followed by Ninja Boy 2 (1993). Super Chinese Land 3 was the next game in the series.

The game was referred to as Super Chinese Land 3 in Electronic Gaming Monthly.

== Plot and gameplay ==
In the game, the two ninjas Jack and Ryu are accompanying Crown Prince Bokuchin to a festival in town. During the festival, the prince opens a magical seal that kept vile monstrosities at bey. The two ninjas must stop the escaped monsters and return them to their before further problems happen.

As in the previous games, it is a role-playing game that turns into a real-time action game when enemies are encountered.

== Release and reception ==
Reception

Review score
| Publication | Score |
|---|---|
| Famitsu | 5/10, 4/10, 5/10, 3/10 (Note: Each of the four reviewers in Famicom Tsūshin scored the game on a ten point scale) |

Super Chinese Land 3 was released in Japan on January 13, 1995 for the Game Boy. All three of the Game Boy titles in the series were released in a video game compilation Sūpāchainīzurando 1 ･ 2 ･ 3 (Note: スーパーチャイニーズランド1･2･3; lit. 'Super Chinese Land 1・2・3') for the console on September 13, 1996 in Japan.

Three of the four reviewers in Famicom Tsūshin found the action element of the game to be poor, citing unresponsive controls, and poor gameplay mechanics that just led to button mashing. One reviewer found the graphics to be poor and said while the game's story was aimed at a younger audiences, adults would find it somewhat amusing.
