= Ferret Monogatari: Watashi no Okini Iri =

2000 Game Boy Color game about ferrets

- Developer: Culture Brain
- Platform: Game Boy Color
- Release: JP: 31 March 2000
- Genres: Simulation, digital pet
- Mode: Single-player

Ferret Monogatari: Watashi no Okini Iri (Ferret Story: My Dear Ferret) is a Japan-only digital pet video game for Game Boy Color created by Culture Brain. Ferret Monogatari is a simulation style game in which the players take care of a ferret.

At the start the players choose one of three different coloured ferrets. The colours are randomly chosen.

The ferret is kept in the cage much of the time. The players have to keep its water and food topped up, and clean its litter box. They can take own ferret out for walks or to play with. They can even play minigames. One is a race, one is putting together a picture and the other is dancing.

Despite the popularity of ferrets in other countries, especially America, this game was never released outside Japan. This may have been due to lack of popularity in Japan.
