= Ninja Boy 2 =

1991 video game

- Box art
- Developer: Culture Brain
- Publisher: Culture Brain
- Series: Super Chinese
- Platform: Game Boy
- Release: JP: November 29, 1991; US: April 1993
- Genre: Action RPG
- Modes: Single-player, multiplayer

Ninja Boy 2 (Note: Japanese: スーパーチャイニーズランド2 宇宙大冒険, Hepburn: Sūpāchainīzurando 2 Uchū Dai-Bōken; lit. 'Super Chinese Land 2: Great Space Adventure') is an action role-playing game for the Game Boy released in 1991. In the game, the ninja Jack and Ryu find that aliens from outerspace have kidnapped all the dignitaries, which lead two the two take them on by creating a spaceship to chase after them.

Ninja Boy 2 was developed and published by Culture Brain. Unlike the previous Ninja Boy (1990) video game, Ninja Boy 2 is an action role-playing video game with battles being done in a beat 'em up style.

The game as first released in Japan on November 29, 1991, and released in the United States in April 1993. The game received poor reviews in Famitsu and GB Action who found its graphics weak.

== Summary ==
An intergalactic conference has been called. Alien invaders came in and kidnapped all the dignitaries; declaring themselves to be the rulers of the entire galaxy in the process. Several alien leaders became lieutenants in order to make the claim look legitimate. Ninja warriors Jack and Ryu must help the people of Futureland defeat the alien overlords by creating a spaceship from scratch. Despite their intentions, Ryu and Jack must land at all the planets in order to repair the spaceship.

== Gameplay ==
Unlike the previous Ninja Boy (1990) video game for the Game Boy, Ninja Boy 2 is an action role-playing video game. It features role-playing elements gameplay like an overworld map and battles that are random encounters. Players can explore towns to shop for equipment and rest at an inn to heal.

The battles are done in a beat 'em up style instead of an RPG format. Each of the playable characters can perform punches and kicks as well as stronger attacks such as the Miracle Kick. Items can be found in this battles such as weaponry including T-stars and swords.

== Development and release ==
Ninja Boy 2 was developed and published by Culture Brain.

Ninja Boy 2 was released in Japan for the Game Boy on November 29, 1991. It was released in the United States in April 1993. Along with Ninja Boy (1990) and Super Chinese Land 3 (1995), it was released in a video game compilation Sūpāchainīzurando 1 ･ 2 ･ 3 (Note: スーパーチャイニーズランド1･2･3; lit. 'Super Chinese Land 1・2・3') for the console on September 13, 1996, in Japan.

== Reception ==
Reception

Review scores
Publication	Score
Famitsu	5/10, 4/10, 4/10, 4/10
GB Action	55%

Ninja Boy 2 was reviewed by four critics in Famitsu. Two reviewers found the narrative poor, noting a forced storyline and poor dialogue. Hirokazu Hamamura commented in the magazine that the puzzle solving elements were much more simplistic than other RPGs of the era.

Reviews in Famitsu and English video game magazines GB Action and GamePro commented on the graphics. Reviewers found the graphics hard to see, especially on the mini-map. The GB Action reviewer found the game ultimately to be "sad and boring" with poor quality graphics. While GamePro found the game to have above-average visuals and sounds, they did find the map scenes hard to see but easy to travel in.

== See also ==
- List of Game Boy games
