= Virtual Hiryū no Ken =

1997 video game

- Publisher(s): Culture Brain
- Series: Hiryū no Ken
- Platform(s): PlayStation
- Release: JP: July 17, 1997
- Genre(s): Fighting action
- Mode(s): Single-player, multiplayer

Virtual Hiryū No Ken is a fighting video game released for the Sony PlayStation, which was published by Culture Brain. The game was followed by Hiryū no Ken Twin (Flying Dragon, Version 1.5) for Nintendo 64.
