= Super Chinese Fighter EX =

1999 video game

- Cover art of Super Chinese Fighter EX
- Developer: Culture Brain
- Publisher: Culture Brain
- Series: Super Chinese
- Platform: Game Boy Color
- Release: JP: December 24, 1999
- Genre: Fighting
- Modes: Single-player, multiplayer

Super Chinese Fighter EX (スーパーチャイニーズファイターEX) is a fighting video game for the Game Boy Color released by Culture Brain in 1999. It is part of the Super Chinese series and is the final Fighter game in the series.

Unlike most of the Super Chinese games, Fighter EX is not an action game or role-playing video game. This game includes many characters of the Super Chinese series, like the main characters Jack and Ryu.
