= Super Chinese 3 =

1991 video game

- Official cover art of Super Chinese 3
- Developer: Culture Brain
- Publisher: Culture Brain
- Producer: Yukio Tanaka
- Programmers: Akira Tachibana; Yuzuru Nanbara; Kazuya Kitajou
- Artists: Takumi Hidaka; Tsukasa Shiina; Hitomi Kawahara; Keiko Mashiba
- Composer: Akinori Sawa
- Series: Super Chinese
- Platform: Family Computer
- Release: JP: March 1, 1991
- Genre: Action RPG
- Mode: Single-player

Super Chinese 3 is an action RPG video game released in 1991 for the Family Computer. It is the last of the Famicom Super Chinese games and was not released outside Japan.

== Gameplay ==
Similar to Little Ninja Brothers before it, Super Chinese 3 incorporates role-playing video game elements into the gameplay.

== Release and reception ==
Reception

Review score
Publication	Score
Famitsu	6/10, 6/10, 7/10, 5/10

Super Chinese 3 was released for the Family Computer on March 1, 1991.
