= Ultimate Fighter =

1992 video game

- North American cover art
- Developer(s): Culture Brain
- Publisher(s): Culture Brain
- Designer(s): Yukio Tanaka
- Programmer(s): Seiji Masuda; Yuzuru Nanbara
- Composer(s): Akinori Sawa
- Series: Hiryū no Ken
- Platform(s): Super NES
- Release: JP: July 31, 1992; NA: June 1994
- Genre(s): 2D fighting action
- Mode(s): Single-player, multiplayer

Ultimate Fighter, known in Japan as Hiryū no Ken S: Golden Fighter (飛龍の拳スペシャル ゴールデンファイター), is a 1992 fighting video game developed and published by Culture Brain for the Super NES.

An updated version of it titled Hiryū no Ken S: Hyper Version (飛龍の拳スペシャル ゴールデンファイター ハイパーバージョン) was later released exclusively in Japan for the same platform on December 11, 1992, which adds a choice of turbo speed levels to increase the speed of the combat.

== Gameplay ==
In the story mode, the main storyline involves a demon named Dargon who has been revived with the sole intent to destroy the Flying Warriors, who are a team of superheroes. Dargon sent in his Tusk Soldiers to raid Shorinji and they ended up stealing the secret scroll of Hiryu-no-ken in addition to a sacred sword. They also offer a challenge to anyone who wants to reclaim these artifacts, that they would have to show up at the World Tournament. It is now up to Rick to enter this fighting tournament and win back these priceless artifacts. During story mode, players control Rick in a side scrolling beat 'em up. One-on-one boss battles will occur on an occasional basis. Players will also be able to find healing items called miracle water which will restore depleted health.

In the VS. tournament mode, up to eight players can fight either each other or against computer opponents in one-on-one battles to win a tournament. Players can choose to play as one of twelve fighters, each with their own special technique.

In the battle mode, players get to fight a one on one battle against a computer-controlled boss opponent of their choice. The animation mode plays out similar to the story mode, except when it comes to the boss battles. Boss battles in this mode turn into turn based events similar to the Final Fantasy series. Players can select from different attack and defensive moves, or can even have the computer fight their battle automatically. Eight unique difficulty levels for more experienced gamers.
