= Merry Gear Solid 2 =

2010 video game

- Developer: Arthur Lee
- Publisher: Arthur Lee
- Engine: Multimedia Fusion 2
- Platform: Windows
- Release: December 13, 2010
- Genre: Stealth game
- Mode: Single-player

Merry Gear Solid 2: Ghosts of Christmas Past is an indie stealth video game and Christmas-themed parody of the Metal Gear series. It is the sequel to Merry Gear Solid: Secret Santa, was developed by Arthur Lee, a.k.a. Mr. Podunkian, and released as freeware on December 13, 2010 for Windows. The protagonist, "Cold Snake", is sent on a mission to retrieve the missing or dead Santa's hat from an extremist group known as the Ghosts of Christmas Past. To do so, he must sneak past "PNCs", or "Pretty Naughty Children". The game was positively received by critics, who called it a well-made and fun freeware game.

== Gameplay ==
The protagonist, Cold Snake, must infiltrate the Outer Savin' shopping mall and retrieve Santa's Hat. He has various gadgets and tools he can use to sneak past or distract PNCs, such as Santa and reindeer costumes, and the ability to knock on walls.

== Development ==
The original Merry Gear Solid was only a few minutes long, developed for a contest held by The Daily Click, and released in 2006. A cut idea from the first game was the "Believability Index", based on Metal Gear Solid 3: Snake Eater, in which wearing more ridiculous outfits made adults less likely to see you, in a manner similar to the Invisible Gorilla Test. However, adults were cut from the game due to time constraints. The sequel was developed in Multimedia Fusion 2, was released in 2010, when Lee was 22 years old, and is far longer, taking more than an hour to complete. At the time, Lee had already graduated from university and was a freelancer. Lee decided to make a sequel, as he believed there was fan demand for one. The game was largely designed and developed by Lee, while Duncan Roberts, who had offered to voice the first game, also recorded the second game's voice acting. Lee also recruited numerous other enthusiastic amateur voice actors for the game, believing it was too obvious that all characters were voiced by the same person. Lee cut many more complex ideas, such as a prequel or controlling an elf similar to Raiden, in favor of a simpler plot about Christmas without Santa Claus. Lee described making the game as extremely time-consuming, saying it would likely be his last in the series.

Some un-implemented ideas for Merry Gear Solid 2 include a working SOCOM pistol that Snake was simply unable to use on enemy children due to his conscience, and an additional boss fight. The game contains some references to the failed Something Awful project The Zybourne Clock, though the relevant dialog was cut.

== Reception ==
PC Zone described Merry Gear Solid 2 as a "light-hearted take" on Metal Gear, and stated that non-fans would be "oblivious" to the many references in the game, but that "people who love their stealth long-winded and Japanese will be rolling in their own joy-summoned filth" after playing just a few minutes of the game. The publication remarked that it was impossible to kill the enemy children as it would be in an actual Metal Gear game. Joystick called the game made with care, saying that Metal Gear fans would be thrilled at references such the stealth, sound and endless codec dialog with Otacon. However, the publication was saddened that the game was only available in English. Making the game their "Free Game of the Day" pick, IGN said that its predecessor was "fantastically quirky, funny, and well-designed", and praised the sequel as not leaning entirely on its humor, also having engaging gameplay that is "polished" and "very fun". Softonic generally praised the game for its numerous references and humor, although they criticized its high amount of backtracking. Gameland described the game as "a great success" in translating the Metal Gear series to a holiday theme.

== See also ==
- UnMetal
