= Shanghai Kid =

1985 video game

- North American arcade flyer
- Developer: Nihon Game
- Publishers: JP: Taito; NA: Memetron
- Platform: Arcade
- Release: JP: June 1985; NA: November 1985
- Genre: Fighting
- Modes: Single-player, multiplayer

Shanghai Kid, sometimes titled The Shanghai Kid and known in Japan as Hokuha Syourin Hiryū no Ken (北派少林 飛龍の拳, lit. "North Faction Shaolin - Fist of the Flying Dragon"), is a 1985 fighting game developed by Nihon Game and published by Taito for arcades. It was released in North America by Memetron under license from Data East. It is the first game in the Hiryū no Ken series.

== Gameplay ==
Shanghai Kid uses an 8-way joystick and two buttons (one for punching and one for kicking).

Set in a tournament competition, players can perform power-punches, kicks, and slams, with martial arts, wrestling and kickboxing represented in the game. The game also makes use of voice sound effects.

It contributes to the fighting game genre by introducing the combo system and the ability to perform special moves. When the spiked speech balloon that reads "RUSH!" pops up during battle, the player has a chance to rhythmically perform a series of combos called "rush-attacking". It resembles combo attacks in later fighting games, such as SNK's the Art of Fighting and The King of Fighters series and the "custom combo" attacks in Street Fighter Alpha 2 (1996). The special moves feature, unlike the basic moves one, allows players to perform moves that are more advanced than the basic ones, and by using two buttons simultaneously instead of one.

== Reception ==
In Japan, Game Machine listed Hiryū no Ken on their August 15, 1985 issue as being the third most successful table arcade unit of the month. In North America, Shanghai Kid was the sixth top-grossing software kit on the RePlay arcade charts in November 1985.
