= Baseball Simulator 1.000 =

1989 video game

- North American cover art
- Developer: Culture Brain
- Publisher: Culture Brain
- Platform: Nintendo Entertainment System
- Release: JP: October 27, 1989; NA: March 1990
- Genre: Baseball
- Modes: Single-player, multiplayer

Baseball Simulator 1.000 (超人ウルトラベースボール; "Choujin Ultra Baseball") is a baseball sports video game released on the NES. It was released in 1989 in Japan and in 1990 in North America.

== Gameplay ==
In the game, there are four leagues available. The first two contain only normal teams, the third contains only ultra teams, and the fourth allows a player to create their own league from any mixture of normal and ultra teams. A player can either control a normal baseball team or an ultra baseball team with super hitting and pitching plays to boost their chances of winning.

Each Ultra play uses a certain number of points. Ultra points are used for special hitting powers and there are also defensive super abilities. These points are limited and when they are all used up no more ultra plays can be performed. There are also some Ultra Upgrades, for outfielders and batters. These cost more points to assign, but become intrinsic effects, and do not cost points to use.

Within Baseball Simulator 1.000, there is an exhibition mode, a regular season mode, and a team edit mode that allows the player to make his own players to form a customized baseball team.

A magic number appears during the regular season, telling the leading team how many victories they have to make until they are assured the pennant.

A season can be 5, 30, 60, 120, or 165 games. Out of the 18 possible teams, only six teams can be used in a division/league during the season, but there are no playoffs for the top two teams. Whoever wins the division is the champion.

=== Baseball Simulator series ===
These baseball titles included some form of "Super League" where pitchers and batters would have special abilities.

- Baseball Simulator 1.000 (1989, NES), also known as Choujin Ultra Baseball.
- Super Baseball Simulator 1.000 (1991, Super NES), also known as Super Ultra Baseball.
- Ultra Baseball Jitsumeiban (1992, SNES), NPB licensed.
- Super Ultra Baseball 2 (1994, SNES)
- Ultra Baseball Jitsumeiban 2 (1994, SNES), NPB licensed.
- Ultra Baseball Jitsumeiban 3 (1995, SNES), NPB licensed.

=== Other ===
- Choujin Ultra Baseball Action Card Battle (2014, 3DS), card-based game.

== Reception ==
Reception

Review score
| Publication | Score |
|---|---|
| Electronic Gaming Monthly | 7/10, 6/10, 7/10, 7/10 |

Electronic Gaming Monthly awarded it "Best Sports-Themed Video Game" in their 1989 awards issue, giving it "top honors ... [for] taking liberty with the sport itself". 1up.com listed it as one of the "hidden gems" of the NES, calling it one of the best baseball games for the system.
