= Don't Buy This =

1985 video game for Spectrum

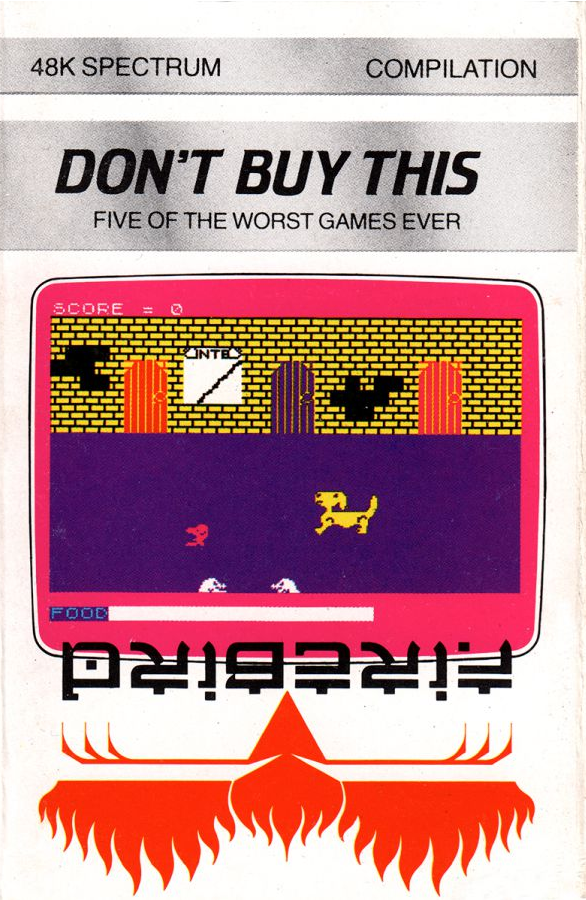
- Cover art of Don't Buy This, depicting a screenshot from Fido 2: Puppy Power
- Developer: Various
- Publisher: Firebird
- Platform: ZX Spectrum
- Release: 1 April 1985
- Genre: Various
- Mode: Single-player

Don't Buy This (also known as Don't Buy This: Five of the Worst Games Ever) is a compilation of video games for the ZX Spectrum released on 1 April 1985. As described on the box, it contains five of the poorest games submitted to publisher Firebird. Instead of rejecting the submissions, they decided to mock the original developers by releasing them together and publicly brand it as "unoriginal" and "awful". Firebird even disowned all their copyright to the game and encouraged buyers to redistribute it at will.

Reviews for the game were universally negative, with critics questioning how to critique the game due to its publicity being based on it being a collection of bad games. Despite the negative reception, the game was a commercial success.

== Games ==
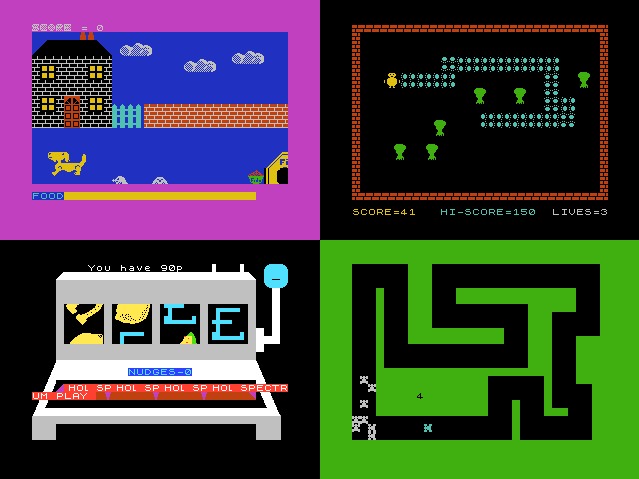
Clockwise: Fido 1, Weasel Willy, Race Ace, and Fruit Machine.

- Fido 1: The player controls a dog named Fido to defeat moles and birds to protect an area for several levels. Fido also needs to keep eating in order to stay alive. In the later levels, enemies such as a low flying canary and a cat which throws projectiles at you are added, but their attacks are very easy to avoid.
- Fido 2: Puppy Power: Features similar gameplay as the original Fido, but Fido can now move up and down instead of just left and right. In addition to Fido being able to defeat enemies with its tail, used as an attack in the previous game, Fido can now shoot laser beams from its eyes in order to destroy other enemies and gain health.
- Fruit Machine: The player controls an animated, low-resolution slot machine with reels that spin rather slowly. The instructions sarcastically describe the game as a "mysterious, original new game [that] requires skill, timing, nerve and absolute concentration". It also suggests that you should play the game in the middle of the night while also sleeping. A medley of short tunes plays when the player wins.
- Race Ace: A racing game where the player controls a light blue race car that can only turn 90 and 180-degree angles. The game is impossible to win, regardless of the speed setting of the player's car because the computer-controlled cars advance more quickly every time the player turns. The controls have the tendency to freeze if another car invades your space. On one screen, the game is erroneously titled "Ace Racer". There is evidence to suggest that Race Ace was first published as its own cassette in 1983, having been developed by Tony Rainbird, who co-created the Firebird label, as opposed to being a submitted indie game.
- Weasel Willy: A game where a purported weasel, which in actuality has the appearance of a humanoid figure in-game, has to avoid trees that are completely green and its own large, uniform footprints. The trees spawn in random locations whenever a level starts, so the weasel may be blocked by trees, preventing the player from being able to play the level. The weasel may even start a level with a tree occupying the same space as it does, causing immediate loss of the level.

== Release ==
The package contains a selection of the worst Spectrum games ever published in the world!

— James Leavey, Firebird's marketing manager on Don't Buy This.

Don't Buy This was published by Telecomsoft under the Firebird label. Firebird disowned the game upon release, with Firebird's marketing manager James Leavey claiming that the game "wasn't released — it just escaped!" The publisher also encouraged copying the game, offering a chance to win a sticker or badge for people who wrote to the company about the game. It was released on 1 April 1985 under Firebird's Silver Range for £2.50. A sequel was in consideration, with the working titles of either Don't Buy This 2, Don't Buy This Again, or Don't Buy This Either.

== Reception ==
Reception

Review scores
Publication	Score
Crash	(39.333333)% (Note: The review gives the score in brackets, leaving the reader to decide whether they should be interpreted as accounting brackets, i.e. a negative score.)
Sinclair User	2/5
Sinclair Programs	9%
Your Spectrum	4/15

Your Spectrum wrote: "The games aren't that bad as do-it-yourself games but, they won't provide that much fun." Sinclair User said it contained "five of the most uninspired games ever to disgrace the Spectrum."

A reviewer for Computer and Video Games noted that the game was difficult to give a score due to it being publicised as being a collection of bad games, but declared it to be "good for a laugh".

John Szczepaniak from Hardcore Gaming 101 featured the game as part of their "Your Weekly Kusoge" column. Szczepaniak, while describing the games as "uninspired, dull and lazy", he did not consider them to be the worst games on the ZX Spectrum. Despite the negative criticism towards the game, Retro Gamer in 2005 reported that it was a commercial success.

== See also ==
- Cassette 50 - Another compilation game for the ZX Spectrum, consisting of unintentionally low quality titles
- Action 52 - A compilation of 52 games, all of them containing major glitches
- List of video games notable for negative reception
