= SAC-46 (handgun) =

SAC-46, "Flying Dragon"
- Type: Single-shot pistol
- Place of origin: United States of America

Service history
- Used by: Office of Strategic Services

Production history
- Designed: 1943 - 1945
- Manufacturer: Long Engineering and Research Company
- Unit cost: 253 USD in 1945 (~ 4693 USD in 2026)
- Produced: 1945
- No. built: 15

Specifications
- Length: 35.5 in (900 mm) with barrel extender
- Barrel length: ~ 16.125 in (409.6 mm), ~ 32.0 in (810 mm) with barrel extender
- Height: 7.0 in (180 mm)
- Cartridge: special plastic dart with metal tip (~ 1,000 produced)
- Caliber: ~ 0.500 in (12.7 mm)
- Rate of fire: 2 rounds/min
- Effective firing range: 100 ft (30 m)
- Sights: 50 ft / 100 ft & 150 ft iron patridge flip sight

The SAC-46 (aka: Flying Dragon and "Gun, Dart, Carbon Dioxide Propelled") is an American clandestine handgun from 1945 which was developed for the Office of Strategic Services (OSS), a predecessor to the Central Intelligence Agency (CIA).

== Design ==
For their clandestine overseas activities during World War II the OSS was interested in weapons that could neutralize opponents securely at a distance without being aurally or visually detectable at a distance, e.g. sound suppressed and flash suppressed firearms or crossbows. One of their ideas in 1943 was the SAC-46 pistol, which was intended to fire a special designed poisoned dart propelled by a commercial type CO_{2}-cartridge like an air gun. The ammunition for the gun is a dart made of transparent red plastic with a metal tip and a rubber gasket at the base of the tip. The dart has four fins at the tail, is about 5.75 inches (146 mm) long with a diameter of about 0.5 inches (13 mm). The gun can be broken down into three pieces: the main body and two 16-inch (410 mm) barrel parts. One of the barrel parts has the simple front sight mounted on to it. Fully assembled the gun is about 35.5 inches (900 mm) long. It is possible to attach only one of the barrel parts to the gun to reduce the overall length at the cost of reduced accuracy. For quickly fitting the barrel parts on to each other and to the body of the gun simple bayonet mounts are used.

Due to its specialized applications and large size the gun is normally transported disassembled and is assembled and loaded just prior to the shooting. To load the gun the operator first has to insert a fresh CO_{2}-cartridge in to its tubular compartment right under the barrel. Then he inserts the dart from the front into the short barrel part of the main body of the gun. The dart is now partly sticking out of the gun. Then he mounts one or both barrel parts on to the body of the gun. The gun is now ready to fire. To fire the gun the operator has to disengage the safety and pull the trigger. The CO_{2} from the cartridge shoots into the barrel behind the dart. The rubber gasket on the front part of the dart seals the gap between the dart and the inner side of the barrel so the pressure of the CO_{2} builds up in the barrel behind the dart and finally propels the dart out of the front of the barrel in the aimed direction of the gun. The shots of the SAC-46 were reported at a volume of 69 decibels (dB) compared to 140 dB or more for a normal gunshot. To reload the gun the operator has to unmount the barrel, replace the CO_{2}-cartridge, insert a new dart into the short barrel and mount the long barrel again on to the body of the gun. The gun sight of the SAC-46 is a simple iron sight with a fixed front sight and a flip sight on the back of the gun. The flip sight has markings for 50, 100 and 150 feet for either the long (marked R for rifle) or short (marked P for pistol) barreled configuration of the gun.

== History ==
The start of the development of the SAC-46 was first documented in 1943 and the basic development of a weapon of this kind went on with low priority. In February 1945 operational examples of the SAC-46 were requested for an actual OSS mission and a first batch of six guns was manufactured in April 1945 by the Long Engineering and Research Company. The guns were tested immediately and some modifications of the first batch were requested and applied together with an order of a second batch of nine guns bringing the total number of guns manufactured up to 15 in June 1945. In July 1945 a comparative testing of the SAC-46 against other OSS weapons with similar applications followed. Only a crossbow, the Wilhelm Tell, was more quiet than the 69 dB of the SAC-46, but the SAC-46 was the least accurate and powerful of the tested weapons. Until the end of World War II no use of the SAC-46 in an actual mission was documented and at this point the OSS still had 12 of the guns and 1,011 darts in its inventory. As a further development of the SAC-46 it was proposed to combine the CO_{2}-cartridge and the poisoned dart into a single missile-like projectile. Of this variant only one prototype was manufactured and tested without leading to adoption into service. A surviving example of the SAC-46 is on display in the John F. Kennedy Special Warfare Museum in Fort Bragg.
