= Action 52 =

1991 multicart video game compilation

- NES cover art
- Developers: Active Enterprises (NES); FarSight Technologies (Genesis)
- Publisher: Active Enterprises
- Directors: Vince Perri; Jay Obernolte (Genesis)
- Producers: Vince Perri; Raul Gomila; Jay Obernolte (Genesis)
- Designer: Mario González (NES)
- Programmers: Albert Hernández; Cronos Engineering, Inc.
- Artist: Javier Pérez
- Writer: Mario González (NES)
- Composers: NES: Mario González; Javier Pérez; Ed Bogas (uncredited); Genesis: Nu Romantic Productions (Mark Steven Miller and Jason Scher)
- Series: The Cheetahmen
- Platforms: Nintendo Entertainment System; Sega Genesis
- Release: NES: NA: May 1992; Sega Genesis: NA: 1993
- Genre: Various
- Modes: Single-player; Multiplayer

Action 52 is an unlicensed multicart video game compilation developed by Active Enterprises for the Nintendo Entertainment System in 1992 and by FarSight Technologies for the Sega Genesis in 1993. It consists of 52 games in a variety of genres, mostly scrolling shooters and platformers. The games include The Cheetahmen, which was part of Active's failed attempt to create a franchise similar to the Teenage Mutant Ninja Turtles. It initially retailed for the comparatively high price of US$199 (equivalent to $470 in 2025).

The NES version of Action 52 sold poorly and became infamous among gamers for the poor quality and functionality of its games; it is often considered to be one of the worst video games of all time. The Genesis version, although considered an improvement, was also negatively received. Many video game collectors value Action 52 for its notoriety and rarity.

== Gameplay ==
=== NES ===
In-game screenshot of Haunted Halls of Wentworth from the NES version (1991) of Action 52

The NES version of Action 52 includes games that cover a variety of genres, the most common types being vertical shooters set in outer space, and platformers. The games have major programming flaws, and some of them freeze or crash, while others include incomplete or endless levels, confusing design, and unresponsive controls. The featured game of this version is The Cheetahmen, being the 52nd and last game, where characters from the previous 51 games appear as enemies.

Each game is given a brief description in the manual for Action 52. Some of the descriptions cover games from the early development of Action 52 that were very different from the games of corresponding titles; for example, Jigsaw is described as a game involving a jigsaw puzzle, but the game titled as such on the final product is a platformer involving a construction worker avoiding construction tools.

Active Enterprises advertised a contest involving Ooze, the fifth game of the NES version. Players who could complete Level 6 of the game could enter a draw for $104,000 ($52,000 cash and a scholarship with the same value). Ooze was reported to consistently crash on Level 2; therefore, it was impossible to qualify for the contest without using an emulator. After the contest had been cancelled, a Revision B of Action 52 was released which fixed this crashing problem, among some others.

The opening sequence of the NES version uses a Yeah! Woo! drum break, famously used in Rob Base and DJ E-Z Rock's song "It Takes Two."

=== Sega Genesis ===
In-game screenshot of Spidey from the Genesis version (1993) of Action 52

Few of the games from the NES version of Action 52 appear in the Sega Genesis version; although many of the titles have been retained, the games themselves have been rebuilt from scratch for the most part. For example, Haunted Hills appears in both versions, but the player character's gender is different (female in the NES version and male in the Genesis version), as is the setting, which is inside a haunted house in the NES version, and outside of one in the Genesis version. In the Genesis version of The Cheetahmen, the titular characters rescue cheetah cubs from Dr. Morbis and his minions.

Many, though not all, of the numerous technical issues with the NES version have been fixed in the Genesis version, which also takes advantage of the Genesis's superior hardware. Each game is color-coded on the main menu screen; "Beginner" games are green, "Intermediate" games are purple, "Expert" games are yellow, "Challenge" games are white, and multiplayer games are blue. The 52nd game, also titled Challenge, consists of a random sequence of the highest levels of the other single-player games. Also included in the Genesis version are the Randomizer, which selects a game at random, and a music demo mode.

== Development ==
Joe Martinez, artist of the Cheetahmen comic (left), and Action 52 creator Vince Perri (right), pictured with the Sega Genesis version of Cheetahmen

The creator of Action 52 was Vince Perri, a businessman from Miami, Florida, and the owner and founder of Active Enterprises. According to Perri, "I happened to see my son playing an illegal product made in Taiwan that had 40 games on it. The whole neighborhood went crazy over it ... I figured I'd do it legally. It's obvious when you see something like that, you know there's something there". Perri met Mario González at a recording studio in Miami, where González was working as a sound engineer. González overheard Perri talking to the studio's owner about his idea for a multicart with 52 original games. González informed Perri that he and his friends, Javier Pérez and Albert Hernández, were into making games; the trio created a Tetris clone called Megatris as proof of their abilities. Perri was impressed with the game and, alongside Raúl Gomila, hired them as well as an unknown fourth developer to create the game, with Hernández acting as the main programmer, González and Pérez composing the music, and González, Pérez, and the fourth developer working on the graphics.

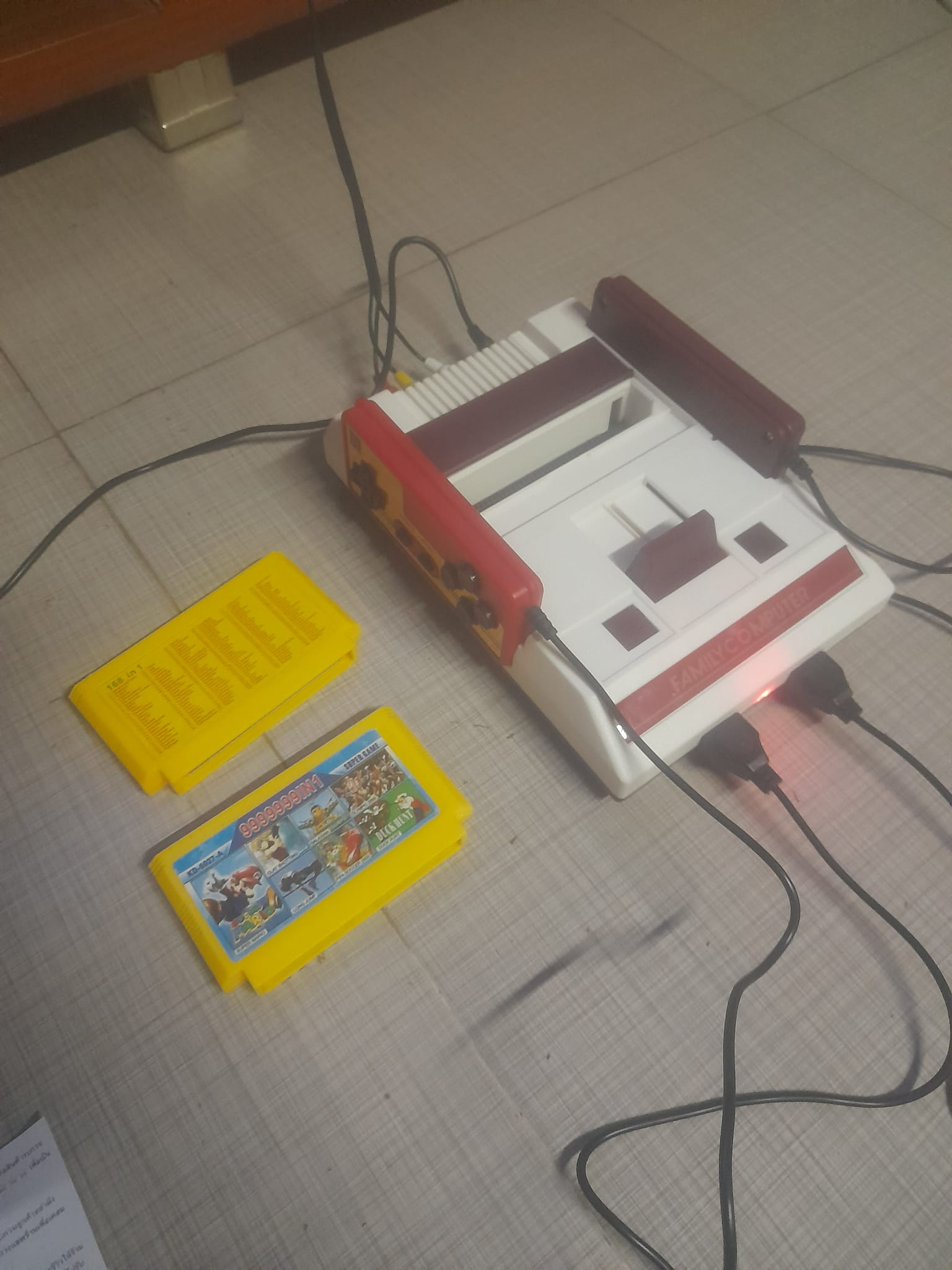
A pirate multicart(Left) with a famiclone(Right). Multicarts from Asia, such as the one pictured above, inspired Vince to develop Action 52.

The four were flown to Salt Lake City, Utah, where they were trained for a week on using an NES development kit by Sculptured Software. The developers, who used an Atari ST, were given three months to complete Action 52, leaving little time for playtesting and fixing bugs. González believes that Perri was well-intentioned in his ideas, but made serious errors due to his lack of knowledge of the gaming industry. González composed most of the game's original music, most notably the Cheetahmen theme; however, some themes, such as Streemerz and Time Warp Tickers, were taken from sample music composed by Ed Bogas for The Music Studio, published by Activision for the Atari ST. González also confirms that, in addition to many unused tiles, Action 52 has eight extra game templates, because the distributor configured the cartridges to contain 60 games by default.

One game from Action 52 was reflective of its era: Storm Over the Desert has players drive an American M1 Abrams tank in a crude top-down depiction of the Gulf War, in similar vein to the Bungie-developed Operation: Desert Storm, which was released a year earlier. Gigantic caricatures of Saddam Hussein spawn randomly on the map, which the player can either shoot or run over with their tank.

In 1993, Perri showcased Action 52 at the International Winter Consumer Electronics Show. He claimed to have raised $5 million for the multicart from private backers in Europe and Saudi Arabia. Technical work was contracted out to Cronos Engineering, Inc., a Boca Raton company who had previously done work for IBM. González created The Cheetahmen, intended by Perri to launch a multimedia franchise and merchandise line that would compete with Teenage Mutant Ninja Turtles. A Cheetahmen promotional comic, illustrated by Joe Martinez, was included in the Action 52 package. However, other planned merchandise was eventually cancelled, such as a Cheetahmen animated television series, full comic book series, T-shirts, and action figures.

The Sega Genesis version of Action 52 was developed by FarSight Technologies, under the direction of Jay Obernolte, using a Macintosh LC. FarSight's experienced programmers, along with the returning Pérez and Hernández (González did not participate, as he was spending more time with his girlfriend, whom he would eventually marry), developed this version in a one-year timeframe. This version was also playtested, and thus had far fewer glitches than the NES version. Mark Steven Miller and Jason Scher of Nu Romantic Productions composed the music for the Genesis version. Active Enterprises also planned to have FarSight develop an SNES version of Action 52 and a sports-themed multicart titled Sports 5, but Active left the gaming industry shortly after.

== Reception ==
Reception

Review score
Publication	Score
AllGame	1/5 (NES)

Critical reception to Action 52 has been largely negative. AllGame editor Skyler Miller described the game as an "unlicensed but legal multicart" containing "NES games of extremely poor quality." Destructoid gave a highly critical review, noting that "there's nothing worth playing in the lot." A Rock Paper Shotgun retrospective review in 2019 delivered the similar criticism, stating that all the games in the collection were "creatively bankrupt rush jobs" and that the best games in the collection could be described as "minigames which functioned."

In 2010, indie game developer Arthur Lee organized a game jam known as "Action 52 Owns" to unofficially remake as many games in the compilation as possible. 23 out of the 52 games were remade at the jam's conclusion, with one of the most notable of which being Lee's own adaptation of Streemerz.

== Legacy ==
The 2024 game UFO 50 had a similar idea behind it, being a compilation of 50 retro-style games. The development team included the creators of Spelunky and Downwell.

== See also ==
- List of commercial failures in video games
- List of video games notable for negative reception
- Asset flip
- Caltron 6 in 1
- Cassette 50
- Don't Buy This
