= Hamster Monogatari 64 =

2001 life simulation video game

- Developer: Culture Brain
- Publisher: Culture Brain
- Platform: Nintendo 64
- Release: JP: April 6, 2001
- Genre: Life simulation game
- Mode: Single-player

Hamster Monogatari 64 (ハムスター物語64, "Hamster Story 64") is a 2001 pet simulation video game developed and published by Culture Brain for the Nintendo 64 in Japan. It is a part of the Hamster Monogatari series.

== Gameplay ==
Hamster Monogatari 64 is a pet simulation video game where the player raises and takes care of a hamster. The player can give the hamster attention, and depending on the level of care, the hamster's personality will develop, becoming either lovable or aggressive. As the hamster matures, it gains new abilities for participating in hamster competitions. Players can raise up to four hamsters, which they can care for in a variety of ways.
