= Time Diver: Eon Man =

- Title screen
- Developer: A.I.
- Publisher: Taito
- Composer: Tsukasa Masuko
- Platform: NES
- Release: NA: Canceled (scheduled for 1993)
- Genre: Action game
- Mode: Single-player

Time Diver: Eon Man is a Nintendo Entertainment System video game developed by A.I. for Taito. Despite being completed in 1993, it was never commercially released. The game is completely finished, receiving a four-page strategy guide and review in issue 45 (February 1993) of Nintendo Power. Despite this, the game eventually disappeared from the Pak Watch section and was subsequently unproduced. Time Diver: Eon Man started life as a sequel to Wrath of the Black Manta, according to an interview the Game Developer Research Institute conducted with the game's planner.

== Story ==
Earth, 60 years into the future. The world is virtually crime free thanks to the Clear System invented by Kane Nelson, scientist extraordinaire. That is, until a secret organization called Romedrux decides to challenge the system by unleashing a plague of crime. In order for them to succeed, they'll need to prevent the Clear System from ever being invented, and that means eliminating Kane or his ancestors. Los Angeles, 1993. Dan Nelson thought he was an ordinary student living in LA until the day he found himself under attack by Romedrux warriors. During the attack, Dan learns about his future son, Kane, and vows to protect his family past, present, and future. It's a race through time in this new sci-fi thriller from Taito!

== Levels ==
Time Diver: Eon Man had five levels set at various points in time. These include: the opening Peaceful (1993), Wild West (1882), Devastated (2052), Devastated (1993), and a Peaceful Utopia version of 2052. For the time, an unusual feature was a randomized stages order, with the exception of Level 1; allowing for some variation when playing through the game multiple times.

== Power-ups ==
Level 1: Peaceful 1993

=== Weapons ===
- Laser: Default weapon you start the game with, useful against bosses.
- Digger: Allows you to dig through the ground in some areas and kills enemies that touch you.
- Earthquake: Kills all enemies on screen except bosses.
- Stop Watch: Temporarily stops time for enemies.
- Flash: Kill all of the enemies on screen except for the bosses, which take damage.

=== Items ===
- HP Restore: Dropped by some defeated enemies, restores health points.
- Weapon Restore: Dropped by some defeated enemies, restores weapons points.
- 1Up: Dropped by some defeated enemies, gives player an extra life.

== Unofficial releases ==
A bootleg of the game was released into the Asian game market as Time Diver: Avenger. It was published by Nitra, short name of Nitra Semiconductor Company (九統半導體股份有限公司). The ROM was hacked to say "Avenger" instead of "Eon Man", the copyright was changed to 1994 and the Taito logo changed to Nitra.

The unmodified ROM was uploaded to the web by Lost Levels in 2007.

Bootleg carts containing a hacked version of the ROM were sold by coinheaven on NintendoAge in 2010.
