= Super Chinese =

- Arcade flyer of Chinese Hero, the first game in the series
- Genres: Role-playing, beat 'em up, fighting
- Developers: Culture Brain; Taiyo System
- Publishers: Namco; Culture Brain

Super Chinese (スーパーチャイニーズ, Sūpā Chainīzu) is a series of action role-playing games for the arcade and various Nintendo systems. The plot of several of the games follow two young boys, Jack and Ryu, as they adventure through their home, Chinaland.

Each of the games in the series were developed by Culture Brain, the earlier games developed by Nihon Game, a name the company used before Culture Brain. The games that were released in North America were retitled, such as Super Chinese, which became Kung Fu Heroes. Many of the games were not released outside Japan.

== Overview ==
=== Common elements ===
In most of the Super Chinese games, Jack and Ryu are the protagonists. They often are fighting to save their homeland, Chinaland.

=== Gameplay ===
The earliest Super Chinese games included action game elements, such as Kung Fu Heroes and Super Chinese Land. The later games in the series, such as Super Ninja Boy also integrated role-playing video game elements into the gameplay. The playable characters gain experience points from action RPG, random encounter battles and increase in levels, becoming more powerful.

== Video games ==
Release timeline
1984	Kung Fu Heroes
1985
1986
1987
1988
1989	Little Ninja Brothers
1990	Ninja Boy
1991	Super Chinese 3
1991	Ninja Boy 2
1991	Super Ninja Boy
1992
1993	Super Chinese World 2
1994
1995	Super Chinese Land 3
1995	Super Chinese Fighter
1995	Super Chinese World 3
1996	Super Chinese Fighter GB
1997
1998
1999	Super Chinese Fighter EX
2000
2001
2002
2003
2004	Twin Series Vol.3: Konchuu Monster + Super Chinese Labyrinth

The Super Chinese series is made up of several video games spanning many of Nintendo's earlier systems. Super Chinese, Super Chinese Land, and Super Chinese World are the three main groups in the series. Chinese Hero was the first video game in the series. Even though Culture Brain (then known as Nihon Game) wasn't mentioned in any part of the game while its publisher Taito was, Chinese Hero was developed by Culture Brain without credit. The Fighter video games are fighting games that allow players to fight with characters from the series, such as Ryu and Jack.

In North America, the series is mostly known as the Ninja Boy series. Ninja Boy, Ninja Boy II, and Super Ninja Boy were all released in North America, as well as Kung Fu Heroes. While the two protagonists are Kung fu practitioners in the original version fitting the Chinese setting, their designs were slightly altered to make them into ninja for the North American market.

Japanese title	Western title	Regions	Release	Platform(s)	Genre
Chinese Hero; Super Chinese	Kung-Fu Heroes	JP, NA	1984	Arcade, Nintendo Entertainment System	Action
Super Chinese 2	Little Ninja Brothers	JP, NA	1989	Nintendo Entertainment System	Role-playing
Super Chinese 3	-	JP	1991	Nintendo Entertainment System	Role-playing
Super Chinese Land	Ninja Boy	JP, NA	1990	Game Boy	Action
Super Chinese Land 2	Ninja Boy 2	JP, NA	1991	Game Boy	Role-playing
Super Chinese Land 3	-	JP	1995	Game Boy	Role-playing
Super Chinese World	Super Ninja Boy	JP, NA	1991	Super Nintendo Entertainment System	Role-playing
Super Chinese World 2	-	JP	1993	Super Nintendo Entertainment System	Role-playing
Super Chinese World 3	-	JP	1995	Super Nintendo Entertainment System	Role-playing
Super Chinese Fighter	-	JP	1995	Super Nintendo Entertainment System	Fighting
Super Chinese Fighter GB	-	JP	1996	Game Boy	Fighting
Super Chinese Fighter EX	-	JP	1999	Game Boy Color	Fighting

Other releases and remakes:

Kung Fu Heroes

- Super Chinese Land 1-2-3 Dash (09/13/1996)
- Super Chinese I+II Advance (06/24/2004)
- Twin Series Vol.3: Konchuu Monster + Super Chinese Labyrinth (12/10/2004)

Super Chinese Land 1-2-3 Dash and Super Chinese I+II Advance are compilations of earlier video games in the series. I+II Advance were also included in a puzzle game titled Super Chinese Labyrinth.
