= Super Ninja Boy =

1991 video game

- North American cover art
- Developer: Culture Brain
- Publisher: Culture Brain
- Director: Yukio Tanaka
- Composer: Akinori Sawa
- Series: Super Chinese
- Platform: Super Famicom/SNES
- Release: Super Famicom/SNES: JP: December 28, 1991; NA: 1992
- Genre: Action RPG
- Modes: Single-player, multiplayer

Super Ninja Boy ^{JPN} is an action role-playing game released by Culture Brain for the Super Famicom in Japan in 1991, and the Super NES in North America in 1993. It features random encounters with side-scrolling battles, although some boss battles are fought with a traditional menu-based system. There are also a few platforming sections.

In single-player mode, the main character is Jack. The game can be switched between single player and multiplayer at will, with the second player controlling Ryu. Jack and Ryu share statistics, so one character never overpowers the other.

Super Ninja Boy features a password system to record progress.

It is a sequel to Culture Brain's previous title, Little Ninja Brothers for the NES and contains a few cameos from other Culture Brain's games.

== Gameplay ==
Super Ninja Boy combines classic role-playing video game elements with action game elements. The player controls the main character Jack (or two players can control both Jack and Ryu) and randomly encounters enemies on the world map and in dungeons. In side-scrolling battles, the player can jump, punch, throw enemies, use items like shurikens or techniques such as the super jump or fireball. Battles take place in a beat'em up style and end after a specific number of enemies are killed (no matter how many are still remaining on screen). Boss battles are fought in a turn-based RPG style, using the same items and skills as normally.

There are also some 2D platform areas, which play the same as the normal battles without depth (the player can only go right or left).

== Release and reception ==
Reception

Review scores
| Publication | Score |
|---|---|
| Famitsu | 6/10, 5/10, 5/10, 4/10 |
| VideoGames & Computer Entertainment | 7/10 |
| Super Control | 11% |

Super Ninja Boy was released in Japan for the Super Famicom on December 28, 1991. Culture Brain presented Super Ninja Boy at the 1993 Winter Consumer Electronics Show (CES) in Las Vegas It received an English-language release by 1992. It was shown again at the 1993 Summer CES held from June 3-6 in Chicago. Reviewers from Super Play commented on the game at the display show saying it did not look great. It was re-released only in Japan on the Wii U Virtual Console on October 1, 2014, followed by the Nintendo Classics service worldwide on January 24, 2025.

In the Japanese magazine Famicom Tsūshin the reviewers found that the game did not really do much to separate itself from previous games in the Super Chinese series. One reviewer said the game was rough overall while another said the controls were poor and sluggish and there was not enough variety in the battle scenes. In VideoGames & Computer Entertainment, Clayton Walnum said it was a "reasonably good action/role-playing game" that benefitted from the unique action fighting scenes making them "a little more tolerable, since it's not anywhere near as meticulous as the turn-oriented variety." Walnum said the games weakness was the poor translation with phrases like "I got excited at him" being too low quality for an expensive product. In the editor's corner of the magazine, other commentators briefly said the game overused the Mode 7 effects with two other reviewers saying the game combat brought the quality down and that it was a poorly programmed game respectively. Super Control said that "everything about Super Ninja Boy is substandard" and that it was "easily one of the most uncomfortable games I've had the displeasure of playing in a long while." and found the game derivative of The Legend of the Mystical Ninja.

== Notes ==
Known in Japan as Super Chinese World (スーパーチャイニーズワールド, Suupaa Chainiizu Waarudo).
