= The Cheetahmen =

- Sega Genesis title screen
- Developer: Active Enterprises
- Publisher: Active Enterprises
- Platforms: Sega Genesis, Nintendo Entertainment System

The Cheetahmen is a video game series created by Active Enterprises starring three anthropomorphic cheetahs. It was introduced in 1991, as part of the Action 52 multi-game cartridge for the NES. It is notable for its main theme, as it was later used as the overworld music in the parody freeware game Syobon Action (also known as "Cat Mario"), as well as its extremely low quality, often being cited as one of the worst video games of all time. The Cheetahmen also appear in an unpublished sequel for the NES, Cheetahmen II, and a Sega Genesis title that was again called The Cheetahmen. Cheetahmen III was in development in 1994 for a prototype handheld console by Active Enterprises but is now considered vaporware.

It was likely made to be a franchise similar to ones such as Kevin Eastman and Peter Laird's Teenage Mutant Ninja Turtles, with which it shares elements: for example, the protagonists being mutated animals named after famous gods in Greek mythology is similar to how the latter has mutated turtles named after Italian Renaissance artists.

== Plot ==
=== Cheetahmen ===
Opening cutscene

A boy called the "Action Gamemaster" is depicted in the first Cheetahmen game's intro sequence, which serves as a framing device. The boy is shown playing a video game when he is abruptly pulled into his television by a robotic arm and meets the Cheetahmen. He is never referred to again during the game or in subsequent Cheetahmen titles, although the manual implies that he transforms into the characters, one after another.

A backstory is provided in a comic book that was included with the Action 52 NES cartridge. A mad scientist named Dr. Morbis kills a mother cheetah while on a safari in Africa and takes her three cubs to his laboratory. Subjected to genetic experimentation, the cubs transform into human-cheetah hybrids who eventually turn on Dr. Morbis after gaining awareness of his true nature and future plans. Dr. Morbis responds by creating an army of various human-animal hybrids (known as "Sub-Humans") to counter the threat posed by the self-aware Cheetahmen. Dr. Morbis does not appear during gameplay, though other villains from the comic book do appear. The Genesis game provides a slightly different premise where the Cheetamen must rescue cheetah cubs from Dr. Morbis.

=== Cheetahmen II ===
Unlike the first game, Dr. Morbis appears in gameplay, and creates the Ape-Man in the beginning of the game to face the Cheetahmen. Dr. Morbis also serves as the boss for the Apollo section, where he runs to the right repeatedly, until he is defeated. The final boss is the Ape-Man, who Hercules fights, but after the Ape-Man is defeated, the game softlocks. For the Aries levels, both of them are levels 2 and 3 from the first game, where the boss is Cygore, and similar to Dr. Morbis, he only runs, though back and forth, and like the Ape-Man, after he is defeated, the game softlocks.

== Characters ==
The playable characters included a trio of the titular Cheetahmen:

- Apollo – Named after Apollo, an ancient Greek god. As his name may suggest, this character is an archer and a scholar versed in many academic fields. He uses a crossbow in combat. As the leader of the Cheetahmen, he was the first to question Dr. Morbis' intentions.
- Hercules - Named after Hercules, the Roman equivalent of the ancient Greek demigod Heracles. This character fights with his bare hands.
- Aries - Named after Ares, the ancient Greek god of war. This character acquired the expertise for fighting with dual wooden clubs by watching movies about martial arts shown to him by Dr. Morbis.

The enemies included:

- Dr. Morbis – a malevolent scientific expert in the field of genetic engineering. His ultimate goals are never made clear.
- Cygore – a cyborg with a robotic arm. In marketing materials, he was depicted with a number of weapon-based attachments that were never used in the games, including a hammer and buzzsaw.
- Sub-Humans – Animals with human qualities, that were experiments created by Dr. Morbis.
  - White Rhino – an anthropomorphic rhinoceros, one of the "Sub-Humans" created by Dr. Morbis.
  - Scavenger – an anthropomorphic vulture, one of the "Sub-Humans" created by Dr. Morbis.
  - Hyena – an anthropomorphic hyena, one of the "Sub-Humans" created by Dr. Morbis.
  - Ape-Man – a chimpanzee-human hybrid, allegedly the most powerful of Dr. Morbis' "Sub-Humans".

== Video games ==
=== Cheetahmen ===
The initial game of this franchise was included on the Action 52 multi-game cartridge for the NES. It was inconsistently titled "Cheetah Men", "Cheetahmen", "Cheetamen", and "The Cheetahmen" within the game selection screen, title screen, and marketing materials. Gameplay consists of six levels, two for each of the three Cheetahmen. The second level includes a boss battle. Most of in-game enemies are characters from the other games of the Action 52 cartridge, including Satan Hosain, a parody of former president of Iraq Saddam Hussein.

=== Cheetahmen II ===
There were plans for a sequel, Cheetahmen II, but it was not completed (6 of 10 proposed levels were made) and was never officially released. In 1996, however, 1,500 copies of the game were found in a warehouse in Florida and eventually put on sale on the secondary market. All copies of the game were reused Action 52 cartridges, some with a small gold sticker reading "Cheetamen II". This cartridge is now very rare and hard to find.

In Cheetahmen II, the player again assumes the role of one of the three Cheetahmen (Aries, Apollo and Hercules); after defeating a boss at the end of the second level, they switch to the next Cheetahman for the following two levels, as in the Action 52 version. Due to a bug, it is impossible to get to the levels in which one plays Cheetahman Aries without altering the ROM image or experiencing a glitch that very rarely starts the game on these two levels.

A patch fixing all the game-breaking bugs was made freely available by romhacking.net member PacoChan in July 2011. Subsequently, a "fixed" version of the game titled Cheetahmen II: The Lost Levels was developed by Greg Pabich. The new version of the game was released on an actual NES cartridge and was intended to fix the fourth level end glitch found in the original game. To fund the game, Pabich started a Kickstarter program in which donors would be given rewards depending on the amount of money pledged. The program started on August 6, 2012, and lasted until September 6. As a promotional tie-in with the project, a video was shot starring James Rolfe (who initially gave the unreleased game a negative review on his Angry Video Game Nerd series), Patrick Contri (better known as Pat the NES Punk), The Game Chasers, and Pabich himself advertising the game. The Kickstarter was met with controversies regarding deceit or fraudulence on behalf of Pabich.

=== Cheetahmen III ===
A third game in the series, Cheetahmen III, was in development exclusively for the Action Gamemaster, a handheld multi-cartridge and CD-ROM clone console also being developed by Active Enterprises named after the intro character of the same name announced at the 1994's Consumer Electronics Show. The system was to have been in the sense of Nintendo's Game Boy and the Atari Lynx, but with much greater aspirations. It would have featured compatibility with the NES, Sega Genesis and SNES cartridge games, as well as CD-ROM games, via separate modules that would be interchangeable with the system and were to retail individually despite concerns of the system being too large and cumbersome to handle. Features would have included a 3.2" color LCD screen, CD player, TV tuner, built-in battery charger, and a cigarette-lighter adapter for cars.

Both the game and console are now considered vaporware as there has been no official word on their cancellation, likely due to Active closing their doors to the gaming market entirely that same year. There is no additional data for Cheetahmen III in terms of what kind of game it would've been.
