= Flying Dragon: The Secret Scroll =

1989 video game

- North American cover art
- Developer: Culture Brain
- Publisher: Culture Brain
- Platforms: Nintendo Entertainment System, Wii U Virtual Console
- Release: NES/Famicom: JP: February 14, 1987; NA: August 1989; Wii U Virtual Console: JP: September 10, 2014; PAL: March 5, 2015
- Genres: Fighting, role-playing video game
- Modes: Single-player, multiplayer

Flying Dragon: The Secret Scroll (飛龍の拳 奥義の書, Hiryū no Ken: Ōgi no Sho; lit. "Fist of the Flying Dragon: Mystery Book") is a 1987 side-scrolling platform video game, which includes some role-playing elements, developed by Culture Brain for the NES. It is the second title in the Hiryū no Ken series.

== Storyline ==
In a mysterious region of China, Ryuhi, was born and raised in high mountain tops. There he received instruction from his wise teacher, Juan. At a young age he became a master of Kempo.

One day, his teacher Juan was attacked and robbed of the Secret Scrolls of Hiryu-no-Ken, of which he was the author. Ryuhi possessed the 6th volume of the Secret Scrolls, the Shingan No Sho, or Book of the Mind's Eye which Juan had managed to save. Ryuhi begins his journey to Shorinji as a last request from a dying Juan. Gengai, the bishop of Shorinji welcomed the little Ryuhi, and begins to train him in Shorinji Kempo.

Six years later, they received a letter of challenge from the Tusk Soldiers, a mysterious organization of enemies of the Shorinji. Ryuhi is determined to take part in the upcoming "World Tournament of Contact Sports" as a representative of Shorinji. His motive is to prevent the Tusk Soldiers from becoming champions of Contact Sports at the tournament. After learning from Gengai that it was the Tusk Soldiers who attacked his teacher and robbed him of the Secret Scrolls, he leaves for the World Tournament.

== Gameplay ==
There are two different types of gameplay. Journey levels are side-scrolling levels where Ryuhi must defeat five bosses and find certain items valuable to the mission. The tournament levels are where the player gets to fight one-on-one against enemies in the same way as the first game in the series released in 1985, Shanghai Kid.

The player must go through the game twice to get the true ending. All six scrolls must be collected the first time through to get the first ending. The second time through the player needs to collect all six scrolls again, along with four crystal balls, who can only be found in the second quest. The players can miss one of these items and finish the game, but the true ending will not be received.

== Reception ==
Upon release, Famitsu rated the game 28 out of 40.
