= Chinese Hero (video game) =

1984 video game

- NES version, renamed Kung-Fu Heroes
- Developer: Nihon Game
- Publishers: JP: Taiyo System (arcade); JP: Taito (arcade); NA: Kitkorp (arcade); JP: Namco (Famicom); NA: Culture Brain (NES)
- Series: Super Chinese
- Platforms: Arcade, Famicom/NES
- Release: Arcade: JP: October 1984; NA: 1984; Famicom/NES: JP: June 20, 1986; NA: March 1989
- Genre: Beat 'em up
- Modes: Single-player, multiplayer

Chinese Hero (Note: Japanese: チャイニーズヒーロー, Hepburn: Chainīzu Hīrō), also known in Japan as Super Chinese (Note: Japanese: スーパーチャイニーズ, Hepburn: Sūpā Chainīzu), is a 1984 beat 'em up video game developed by Nihon Game and published by Taiyo System and Taito for arcades. Chinese Hero is the first game in the Super Chinese series. It was ported to the Nintendo Entertainment System as Kung-Fu Heroes in Japan by Nihon Game in 1986 and was published in North America in 1989 using the Culture Brain name. The game was included in a 2004 Game Boy Advance collection titled Super Chinese I+II Advance. It was released for the Nintendo Classics service in August 2019.

== Plot ==
Monsters have taken Princess Min-Min captive and have stolen the 10 treasures of the nameless land the game takes place in, leaving everything in sorrow. Kung-fu Masters Jacky and Lee return from training and must set out to rescue the princess and find the treasures.

== Gameplay ==
Screenshot of Chinese Hero (arcade)

The player controls one of the characters, Jacky or Lee, and each level pits the player against countless enemy warriors. The goal is for the player to defeat enough enemies so that the door at the top of the room opens allowing the player to exit the room and proceed to the next. Enemies' attacks and weapons vary throughout the game. There are quite a number of BONUS levels that players can enter.

== Reception ==
In Japan, Game Machine listed Chinese Hero on their October 15, 1984 issue as being the most-successful table arcade unit of the month.
