= Culture Brain =

Japanese video game developer and publisher

Culture Brain Excel
- Native name: 株式会社カルチャーブレーン
- Romanized name: Kabushiki Gaisha Karuchā Burēn
- Industry: Video games
- Founded: October 5, 1980; 45 years ago
- Headquarters: Katsushika, Tokyo, Japan
- Total equity: ¥192 million (2007)
- Website: Official website

Culture Brain Inc. (株式会社カルチャーブレーン, Kabushiki-gaisha Karuchā Burēn) is a Japanese video game developer and publisher founded on October 5, 1980. In 2016, it was renamed Culture Brain Excel.

== History ==
Culture Brain was founded in 1980 as Nihon Game Corporation. In 1981, a subsidiary to handle the sales operations of the company was established. Its first video games were arcades games, with titles such as Shanghai Kid and Chinese Hero that were manufactured under "Taiyo System" trademark.

1984 saw the release of Chinese Hero, a beat-em-up and the first entry in the Super Chinese series for the Famicom, retitled as Kung-Fu Heroes.

In 1987, it transitioned from arcade to console video games and renamed itself "Culture Brain". The company has also alternatively used the brand "Micro Academy" in the mid-1980s.

In North America, Culture Brain is mostly known for its six video games for the Nintendo Entertainment System and its three for the Super NES. Three of those NES games, Baseball Simulator 1.000, The Magic of Scheherazade and Flying Dragon 2, were strongly redesigned from their Japanese source to better appeal to North American consumers. Several spinoffs were also released on the Game Boy, Ninja Boy and Ninja Boy 2.

Culture Brain was distinct for its innovative gameplay by incorporating multiple genres in its games. Somewhat ahead of their time, the genre-bending in titles such as Scheherazade foreshadowed development of the Metroidvania genre, for example, even when games' designs were flawed. Titles such as Little Ninja Brothers built on this and were experimental, and used humor. These games combined genres, including Super Ninja Boy, the SNES entry of the Super Chinese series, which feature RPG elements alongside beat-em-up mechanics.

Like other Japanese video game companies, Culture Brain ceased its operations in the United States in the 1990s. Ever since the demise of Culture Brain USA, video games developed by the parent company have rarely made it in America. One exception is the Nintendo 64 title Flying Dragon, which was published by Natsume Inc. in the United States.

=== Culture Brain Excel era ===
In 2016, the company was renamed Culture Brain Excel and the website's URL was changed to the new name. The longtime Culture Brain logo was instantly dropped with the intent of launching a new logo in the following year.

In September 2021, Culture Brain Excel was renamed as Nihon Game once again, returning to its original name from 1980.

== Subsidiary ==
Culture Brain also ran until 2003 a professional school, the Culture Brain Art Institute.

== Games ==
=== Baseball Simulator series ===
These baseball titles included some form of "Super League" where pitchers and batters would have special abilities.

- Baseball Simulator 1.000 (1989, NES), also known as Choujin Ultra Baseball
- Super Baseball Simulator 1.000 (1991, Super NES), also known as Super Ultra Baseball
- Ultra Baseball Jitsumeiban (1992, SNES), NPB licensed.
- Super Ultra Baseball 2 (1994, SNES)
- Ultra Baseball Jitsumeiban 2 (1994, SNES), NPB licensed.
- Ultra Baseball Jitsumeiban 3 (1995, SNES), NPB licensed.
- Pro Yakyū Star (1997, SNES), NPB licensed.

=== Hiryū no Ken series ===
- Shanghai Kid (known in Japan as Hokuha Syourin Hiryu no Ken (Arcade)
- Hiryu no Ken Special: Fighting Wars (NES - Japan only)
- Flying Dragon: The Secret Scroll (NES)
- Flying Warriors (NES)
- Fighting Simulator 2-in-1: Flying Warriors (Game Boy)
- Ultimate Fighter (Super NES)
- SD Hiryu no Ken Gaiden (Game Boy)
- Flying Dragon (Nintendo 64)
- SD Hiryu no Ken Densetsu (Nintendo 64 - Japan only)
- Hiryu no Ken Retsuden GB (Game Boy Color)
- Virtual Hiryu No Ken (Sony PlayStation)

=== Super Chinese series ===
In this list are series which were originally released as "Chinese Hero", but became better known as Super Chinese, but with the exception of "Kung-Fu Heroes", these titles were released in North America as the "Ninja Brothers" series.

- Chinese Hero (Arcade)
- Kung Fu Heroes (NES)
- Little Ninja Brothers (NES)
- Ninja Boy (Game Boy)
- Super Chinese 3 (NES)
- Super Ninja Boy (Super NES)
- Ninja Boy 2 (Game Boy)
- Super Chinese World 2 (Super NES)
- Super Chinese Fighter (Super NES)
- Super Chinese Land 3 (Game Boy)
- Super Chinese World 3 (Super NES)
- Super Chinese Land 1-2-3 Dash (Game Boy)
- Super Chinese Fighter GB (Game Boy)
- Super Chinese I+II Advance (Game Boy Advance)
- Twin Series Vol. 3: Konchuu Monster/Super Chinese Labyrinth (Game Boy Advance)

=== Oshare Princess series ===
A Japan-only series of games for the GBA (with two DS versions) about fashion and dressing up. The games feature a wide range of clothes, shoes, accessories and makeup to be used in different combinations. There are 5 GBA games and 2 DS games.

=== Ferret/Hamster Monogatari series ===
A Japan-only series of games formally about care-taking ferrets, and later about care-taking hamsters. The illustrations of the Hamster Monogatari ones were heavily inspired by Ritsuko Kawai's children's storybook series, Hamtaro.

- Ferret Monogatari: Watashi no Okini Iri (Game Boy Color)
- Hamster Monogatari (Sony PlayStation)
- Hamster Monogatari 64 (Nintendo 64)
- Hamster Monogatari 2 GBA (Game Boy Advance)
- Hamster Monogatari GB + Magi Ham Mahou no Shoujo (Game Boy Color)
- Hamster Monogatari 3 GBA (Game Boy Advance)
- Hamster Monogatari Collection (Game Boy Advance)
- Hamster Monogatari 3EX, 4, Special (Game Boy Advance)

=== Konchuu Monster series ===
A Japan-only series of games about catching, training and battling insects. First released with Super Chinese Labyrinth both in Volume 3 of Culture Brain's Twin Series, a series of two-in-one Game Boy Advance games.

- Twin Series Vol. 3: Konchuu Monster/Super Chinese Labyrinth (Game Boy Advance)
- Konchuu Monster: Battle Master (Game Boy Advance)
- Konchuu Monster: Battle Stadium (Game Boy Advance)
- Konchuu no Mori no Daibouken (Game Boy Advance)

=== Other ===
- The Magic of Scheherazade (NES)
- First Queen (Super NES)
- Osu!! Karate Bu (Super NES)
- Computer Nouryoku Kaiseki: Ultra Baken (Super NES)
- Sweet Cookie Pie (Game Boy Advance)
