= List of fighting games =

This is a comprehensive index of commercial fighting games, sorted by name. Information regarding release year, release platform, graphics, movement, subgenres, multiplayer types, developers, and publishers is provided where available. The table can be sorted by clicking on the small boxes next to the column headings.

Fighting games are characterized by close combat between two fighters or groups of fighters of comparable strength, often broken into rounds or stocks. If multiple players are involved, players generally fight against each other.

== Legend ==
Video game platforms
3DS	Nintendo 3DS, 3DS Virtual Console, iQue 3DS	DROID	Android	GCN	GameCube
iOS	iOS, iPhone, iPod, iPadOS, iPad, visionOS, Apple Vision Pro	LIN	Linux, SteamOS	N64	Nintendo 64, iQue Player
NS	Nintendo Switch	NS2	Nintendo Switch 2	OSX	macOS
PS3	PlayStation 3	PS4	PlayStation 4	PS5	PlayStation 5
Wii	Wii, WiiWare, Wii Virtual Console	WiiU	Wii U, WiiU Virtual Console	WIN	Windows, all versions Windows 95 and up
XB360	Xbox 360, Xbox 360 Live Arcade	XBO	Xbox One		

== List ==
Year	Title	Platform	Graphics	Movement	Multiplayer Type	Fighter Subgenre	Theme	Developer	Publisher	Ref.
	.hack//Versus		3D	3D				CyberConnect2		
	2XKO		2D	3D	Tag team			Riot Games		
	Aazohm Krypht		2D	2D				Logitron		
	Acceleration of Suguri						Flyting	Orange Juice, Rockin' Android		
	Aggressors of Dark Kombat		2D	2D				ADK		
	Akatsuki Blitzkampf		2D	2D	4-way		Anime	Subtle Style		
	Akatsuki Blitzkampf Ausf. Achse		2D	2D			Anime	Subtle Style		
	Akatsuki Shisei Ichigō		2D	2D			Anime	Subtle Style		
	All Star Fighters		2D	3D				Essential Games		
	Antinomy of Common Flowers (Touhou Project 15.5)		2D	2D				Twilight Frontier, Team Shanghai Alice		
	Antistatic		2D	3D		Platform fighter		Blue Hexagons		
	Aquapazza: Aquaplus Dream Match		2D	2D			Anime, Crossover	Examu		
	Arcana Heart		2D	2D			Anime	Examu, Team Arcana		
	Arcana Heart 2		2D	2D			Anime	Examu, Team Arcana		
	Arcana Heart 3		2D	2D			Anime	Examu, Team Arcana		
	Arcana Heart 3 Love Max: Six Stars!!!!!!		2D	2D			Anime	Examu, Team Arcana		
	Arcana Heart 3 Love Max: Six Stars!!!!!! XTEND		2D	2D			Anime	Examu, Team Arcana		
	Arcana Heart 3: Love MAX!!!!!		2D	2D			Anime	Examu, Team Arcana		
	Arcana Heart Full!		2D	2D			Anime	Examu, Team Arcana		
	Armajet		2D	3D		Platform fighter		Super Bit Machine		
	Armor Mayhem		2D	2D		Platform fighter		Louissi		
	Armored Warriors						Mecha	Capcom		
	ARMS		3D	3D	4-way	Platform fighter, Arena fighter, Sports (boxing)		Nintendo		
	Art of Fighting		2D	2D				SNK		
	Art of Fighting 2		2D	2D				SNK		
	Art of Fighting 3: The Path of the Warrior		2D	2D				SNK		
	Astra Superstars		2D	2D			Flyting	Sunsoft		
	Asuka 120% Burning Festival		2D	2D			Anime	Fill-in-Cafe		
	Asuka 120% Excellent Burning Festival		2D	2D			Anime	Fill-in-Cafe, FamilySoft		
	Asuka 120% Final Burning Festival		2D	2D			Anime	FamilySoft, SUCCESS		
	Asuka 120% Limited Burning Festival		2D	2D			Anime	Kodansha		
	Asuka 120% Maxima Burning Festival		2D	2D			Anime	Fill-in-Cafe		
	Asuka 120% Return Burning Festival		2D	2D			Anime	FamilySoft		
	Asuka 120% Special Burning Festival		2D	2D			Anime	FamilySoft		
	Asura Blade: Sword of Dynasty		2D	2D				Fuuki		
	Asura Buster: Eternal Warriors		2D	2D				Fuuki		
	Avengers in Galactic Storm		2D					Data East		
	Axel City		2D	2D			Anime	Project Atsuki		
	Axel City 2		2D	2D			Anime	Project Atsuki		
	Ballz		3D	3D				Accolade		
	Bangkok Knights		2D	2D				System 3		
	Barbarian		2D	2D				Palace Software		
	Barbarian		3D	3D		Platform fighter		Saffire		
	Barbarian II: The Dungeon of Drax / Axe of Rage		2D	2D				Palace Software		
	Barbarian: The Ultimate Warrior / Death Sword		2D	2D				Palace Software		
	Battle Arena Nitoshinden						Chibi	Tamsoft		
	Battle Arena Toshinden		2D	2D				Betop		
	Battle Beast		2D	2D				7th Level		
	Battle Blaze		2D	2D				Sammy		
	Battle Fantasia		2D	3D				Arc System Works		
	Battle K-Road		2D	2D				Psikyo		
	Battle Master: Kyuukyoku no Senshitachi		2D	2D				System Vision		
	Battle Monsters		2D	2D				Naxat Soft		
	Battle Raper						Eroge	Illusion		
	Battle Raper 2						Eroge	Illusion		
	Battle Stadium D.O.N.		2D	3D	4-way	Platform fighter	Anime, Crossover	Namco Bandai Games, Eighting, Q Entertainment		
	Battle Tryst		3D	3D				Konami		
	Battle Tycoon: Flash Hiders SFX		2D	2D				Right Stuff		
	BattleCry		2D	2D				Home Data		
	Best of Best		2D	2D				SunA		
	Panza Kick Boxing / Best of the Best: Championship Karate		2D	2D				Loriciels		
	Bible Fight		2D	2D				This is Pop		
	Big Bang Beat		2D	2D			Anime	NRF Software, Alicesoft		
	Bikini Karate Babes		2D	2D				Creative Edge Studios		
	Bio F.R.E.A.K.S.		3D	3D				Saffire		
	Bishōjo Senshi Sailor Moon S: Jōgai Rantō!? Shuyaku Sōdatsusen		2D	2D			Anime	Arc System Works, Angel		
	Black Belt		2D	2D				Earthware Computer Services		
	Black Hole Assault		2D	2D				Micronet		
	Blade Arcus from Shining		2D		Tag team			Sega		
	Blade Strangers		2D	3D			Crossover	Studio Saizensen, Nicalis		
	Blades of Crossed Hearts		2D	2D				Owen CMYK		
	Blandia		2D	2D				Allumer		
	BlayzBloo: Super Melee Brawlers Battle Royale		2D	2D				Arc System Works		
	BlazBlue: Calamity Trigger		2D	2D			Anime	Arc System Works		
	BlazBlue: Calamity Trigger Portable		2D	2D			Anime	Arc System Works		
	BlazBlue: Central Fiction		2D	2D			Anime	Arc System Works		
	BlazBlue: Chrono Phantasma		2D	2D			Anime	Arc System Works		
	BlazBlue: Chrono Phantasma Extend		2D	2D			Anime	Arc System Works		
	BlazBlue: Clone Phantasma		2D	3D			Anime	Arc System Works		
	BlazBlue: Continuum Shift		2D	2D			Anime	Arc System Works		
	BlazBlue: Continuum Shift Extend		2D	2D			Anime	Arc System Works		
	BlazBlue: Continuum Shift II		2D	2D			Anime	Arc System Works		
	BlazBlue: Cross Tag Battle		2D	2D	Tag team		Anime, Crossover	Arc System Works		
	Bleach: Dark Souls		2D	2D	4-way		Anime	Treasure		
	Bleach: The Blade of Fate		2D	2D	4-way		Anime	Treasure		
	Blood Warrior / Ooedo Fight		2D	2D				Kaneko		
	BloodStorm		2D	2D				Incredible Technologies		
	Blue Breaker Burst: Egao no Asuni		3D	3D				HuneX		
	Blue Breaker Burst: Hohoemi o Anata to		3D	3D				HuneX		
	Blue Mischief		2D	2D		Platform fighter		Team WING		
	Body Blows		2D	2D				Team17		
	Body Blows Galactic		2D	2D				Team17		
	Bounces		2D	2D				Denton Designs		
	Bounty Battle						Crossover	Dark Screen Games		
	Brawlhalla		2D	2D		Platform fighter	Crossover	Blue Mammoth Games		
	Brawlout		2D	3D		Platform fighter	Crossover	Angry Mob Games		
	Breakers		2D	3D				Visco		
	Breakers/Breakers Revenge		2D	2D				Visco		
	Uchi Mata / Brian Jack's Uchi Mata		2D	2D				Martech		
	Brutal Unleashed: Above the Claw		2D	2D				GameTek		
	Brutal: Paws of Fury		2D	2D				GameTek		
	Budokan: The Martial Spirit		2D	2D				Electronic Arts		
	Bundesfighter II Turbo		2D	2D				funk		
	Buriki One		3D	3D		Sports (MMA)		SNK		
	Burning Rival		2D	2D				Sega		
	Bushido Blade		3D	3D				Square-Enix, Lightweight		
	Bushido Blade 2		3D	3D				Square-Enix, Lightweight		
	Bust a Groove							Metro		
	Bust a Groove 2							Metro		
	Canimals Fighters		2D	3D				Voozclub Co. Ltd, Playplus		
	Capcom Fighting All-Stars		3D	3D				Capcom		
	Capcom Fighting Evolution		2D	2D			Crossover	Capcom		
	Capcom vs. SNK 2: Mark of the Millennium 2001						Crossover	Capcom / SNK		
	Capcom vs. SNK: Millennium Fight 2000						Crossover	Capcom / SNK		
	Capital Punishment		2D	2D				ClickBOOM		
	Capoeira Fighter		2D	2D				Spiritonin		
	Capoeira Fighter 2		2D	2D				Spiritonin		
	Capoeira Fighter 3		2D	2D				Spiritonin		
	Cardinal Syn		3D	3D				Kronos		
	Cartoon Network: Punch Time Explosion / Cartoon Network: Punch Time Explosion XL		2D	3D	4-way	Platform fighter	Crossover	Crave, Papaya Studio		
	Castlevania Judgment		3D	3D		Arena fighter		Konami, Eighting		
	Catfight		2D	2D				Atlantean Interactive Games		
	Celebrity Deathmatch		3D	3D				Big Ape		
	Chaos Breaker / Dark Awake		2D	2D				Eolith, Taito		
	Chaos Code		2D	2D			Anime	FK Digital pty ltd.		
	Chaos Code -Nemesis Experiment-		2D	2D			Anime	FK Digital pty ltd.		
	Chaos Code: (New) Sign of Catastrophe / Exact Xeno Attack		2D	2D			Anime	FK Digital pty ltd.		
	Chinese Hero		2D	2D				Taiyo System		
	Cho Aniki: Bakuretsu Ranto Hen		2D	2D				NCS		
	Chop Suey		2D	2D				English Software		
	Choy Lee Fut: Kung-Fu Warrior		2D	2D				Positive		
	ClayFighter		2D	2D				Interplay		
	ClayFighter 2 / ClayFighter 2: Judgement Clay / C2: Judgement Clay		2D	2D				Interplay		
	ClayFighter 63⅓		2D	2D				Interplay		
	ClayFighter: Sculptor's Cut		2D	2D				Interplay		
	ClayFighter: Tournament Edition		2D	2D				Interplay		
	Cosmic Carnage		2D	2D				Sega		
	Crimson Alive: Burst Again		2D	2D				Keropyon		
	Crimson Alive: Extreme Encounter		2D	2D				Keropyon		
	Crimson Alive: Genesis of The Heretic		2D	2D				Keropyon		
	Critical Blow		2D	3D				Racdym		
	Criticom		3D	3D				Kronos		
	Cross Theater		2D	2D				ABC Maru		
	Custom Beat Battle: Draglade		2D	2D		RPG, Music		Dimps		
	Cyber Troopers Virtual-On Oratorio Tangram		3D	3D		Arena fighter		Sega AM3		
	Cyberbots: Full Metal Madness		2D	2D			Mecha	Capcom		
	D-Xhird		3D	3D				Nextech		
	Daemon Bride		2D	2D			Anime	Examu		
	Daemon Bride: Additional Gain		2D	2D			Anime	Examu		
	Dangerous Streets		2D	2D				Micromania		
	Dark Edge		3D	3D				Sega		
	Dark Rift		3D	3D				Kronos		
	Darkstalkers 3		2D	2D				Capcom		
	Darkstalkers: The Night Warriors		2D	2D				Capcom		
	Dead or Alive		3D	3D				Team Ninja, Tecmo, Koei Tecmo		
	Dead or Alive 2		3D	3D	Tag team			Team Ninja, Tecmo, Koei Tecmo		
	Dead or Alive 3		3D	3D	Tag team			Team Ninja, Tecmo, Koei Tecmo		
	Dead or Alive 4		3D	3D	Tag team		Crossover	Team Ninja, Tecmo, Koei Tecmo		
	Dead or Alive 5		3D	3D	Tag team		Crossover	Team Ninja, Tecmo, Koei Tecmo		
	Dead or Alive 5 Last Round		3D	3D	Tag team			Team Ninja, Tecmo, Koei Tecmo		
	Dead or Alive 5 Plus		3D	3D				Team Ninja, Tecmo, Koei Tecmo		
	Dead or Alive 5 Ultimate		3D	3D	Tag team			Team Ninja, Tecmo, Koei Tecmo		
	Dead or Alive 6		3D	3D			Crossover	Team Ninja, Tecmo, Koei Tecmo		
	Dead or Alive Online		3D	3D	Tag team			Team Ninja, Tecmo, Koei Tecmo		
	Dead or Alive Ultimate		3D	3D	Tag team			Team Ninja, Tecmo, Koei Tecmo		
	Dead or Alive: Dimensions		3D	3D	Tag team		Crossover	Team Ninja, Tecmo, Koei Tecmo		
	Deadliest Warrior: The Game		3D	3D				Pipeworks Software		
	Deadly Arts		3D	3D				Konami		
	Demon Slayer the Hinokami Chronicles		3D	3D			Anime	CyberConnect2		
	Demon Slayer the Hinokami Chronicles 2		3D	3D			Anime	CyberConnect2		
	Demon Slayer: Kimetsu no Yaiba – The Hinokami Chronicles		3D	3D		Arena fighter	Anime	CyberConnect2		
	Dengeki Bunko: Fighting Climax		2D	2D			Anime, Crossover	Sega, French-Bread, Ecole Software		
	Destrega		3D	3D	4-way	Arena fighter		Koei		
	Digimon All-Star Rumble		3D	3D	4-way	Arena fighter		Bandai Namco		
	Digimon Rumble Arena		2D	3D		Platform fighter		Namco Bandai Games		
	Digimon Rumble Arena 2		2D	3D	4-way	Platform fighter		Namco Bandai Games		
	Dino Rex		2D	2D				Taito		
	Dissidia 012 Final Fantasy		3D	3D		Arena fighter, RPG		Square Enix		
	Dissidia Final Fantasy NT		3D	3D		Arena fighter, RPG		Team Ninja		
	Dissidia: Final Fantasy		3D	3D		Arena fighter, RPG		Square Enix		
	Divekick		2D	2D				Iron Galaxy		
	DNF Duel		2D	3D		RPG	Anime	Neople, Arc System Works, Eighting		
	Doomsday Warrior Taiketsu!! Brass Numbers(Japanese name)		2D	2D				Renovation Productions Inc.		
	Double Dragon: The Movie		2D	2D				Technos		
	Dr. Doom's Revenge		2D	2D				Empire Interactive		
	Draglade					RPG, Music		Dimps		
	Dragon Ball FighterZ		2D	3D	Tag team		Anime	Arc System Works		
	Dragon Ball GT: Final Bout		3D	3D			Anime	TOSE, Bandai		
	Dragon Ball Kai: Ultimate Butoden		2D	2D			Anime	Bandai Namco, Game Republic		
	Dragon Ball Xenoverse		3D	3D		Arena fighter, RPG	Anime	Bandai Namco		
	Dragon Ball Xenoverse 2		3D	3D		Arena fighter, RPG	Anime	Bandai Namco		
	Dragon Ball Z (Arcade)		2D	2D				Banpresto		
	Dragon Ball Z: Burst Limit		3D	3D			Anime	Dimps		
	Dragon Ball Z: Extreme Butōden		2D	2D			Anime	Bandai Namco, Arc System Works		
	Dragon Ball Z: Infinite World		3D	3D			Anime	Dimps		
	Dragon Ball Z: Shin Butōden		2D	2D			Anime	TOSE, Bandai		
	Dragon Ball Z: Super Butōden		2D	2D			Anime	TOSE, Bandai		
	Dragon Ball Z: Super Butōden 2		2D	2D			Anime	TOSE, Bandai		
	Dragon Ball Z: Super Butōden 3		2D	2D			Anime	TOSE, Bandai		
	Dragon Ball: Raging Blast		3D	3D		Arena fighter	Anime	Spike		
	Dragon Ball: Raging Blast 2		3D	3D		Arena fighter	Anime	Spike		
	Dragon Blast		2D	3D				Dragon Tea		
	Dragon Master		2D	2D				Unico		
	Dragon: The Bruce Lee Story		2D	2D				Virgin		
	Dragoon Might		2D	2D				Konami		
	Dream Mix TV World Fighters		2D	3D	4-way	Platform fighter	Anime, Crossover	Hudson Soft, Bitstep		
	Dual Blades		2D	2D				Vivid Image		
	Dual Heroes		3D	3D				Hudson Soft		
	Duel 2000		2D	2D				Coktel Vision		
	Dynamite Bomb!!		2D	2D			Anime	Light Green 8		
	Dynasty Warriors		3D	3D				Koei		
	Ehrgeiz		3D	3D				DreamFactory		
	EN-Eins Perfektewelt		2D	2D			Anime	Subtle Style		
	EN-Eins Perfektewelt Anastasis		2D	2D			Anime	Subtle Style		
	Eternal Champions		2D	2D				Sega		
	Eternal Champions: Challenge from the Dark Side		2D	2D				Sega		
	Eternal Fighter Zero		2D	2D			Anime	Tasogare Frontier		
	Evil Zone		3D	3D				Yuke's		
	Expect No Mercy		2D	2D				Microforum International		
	Exteel						Chibi (Note: Only when "SD Mode" is selected)	NCsoft		
	The Eye of Typhoon / Kyoku Cho Gou Ken		2D	2D	Tag team			Viccom		
	The Fallen Angels / Daraku Tenshi		2D	2D				Psikyo		
	Fantasy Strike		2D	3D				Sirlin Games		
	Fatal Fury 2		2D	2D				SNK		
	Fatal Fury 3: Road to the Final Victory		2D	2D				SNK		
	Fatal Fury Special		2D	2D				SNK		
	Fatal Fury: 1st Contact		2D	2D				SNK		
	Fatal Fury: City of the Wolves		2D	3D			Crossover	SNK		
	Fatal Fury: First Contact						Chibi	SNK		
	Fatal Fury: King of Fighters		2D	2D				SNK		
	Fate/tiger colosseum		3D	3D			Chibi	Capcom, Cavia, Type-Moon		
	Fate/unlimited codes		3D	3D			Anime	Capcom, Cavia, Eighting, Type-Moon		
	Fight Club		3D	3D				Vivendi Universal Games		
	Fight Fever / Wang Jung Wang		2D	2D				Viccom		
	Fight for Life		3D	3D				Atari		
	Fight of Gods		2D	3D			Crossover	Digital Crafter		
	The Fight: Lights Out		3D	3D				SCE		
	Fighter Within		2D	3D				Ubisoft		
	Fighter's History		2D	2D				Data East		
	Fighter's History Dynamite		2D	2D				Data East		
	Fighter's History: Mizoguchi Kiki Ippatsu!!		2D	2D				Data East		
	Fighter's Impact		3D	3D				Taito		
	Fighter's Impact A		3D	3D				Taito		
	Fighters Megamix		3D	3D			Crossover	Sega, Tiger Electronics		
	Fighters Uncaged		2D	3D		Arena fighter		Ubisoft		
	Fightin' Spirit		2D	2D				Lightshock Software		
	Fighting Bujutsu		3D	3D				Konami		
	Fighting Bujutsu 2nd!		3D	3D				Konami		
	Fighting EX Layer / Fighting EX Layer: Another Dash		2D	3D			Crossover	Arika		
	Fighting Layer		3D	3D				Arika		
	Fighting Masters		2D	2D				Treco		
	Fighting Road		2D	2D				Toei Animation		
	Fighting Vipers		3D	3D				Sega-AM2		
	Fighting Vipers 2		3D	3D				Sega-AM2		
	Final Fight Revenge		3D	3D				Capcom		
	FIST		3D	3D				Genki		
	Fist Fighter		2D	2D				Zeppelin		
	Fist II: The Legend Continues / Fist: The Legend Continues / Exploding Fist II: The Legend Continues		2D	2D				Beam Software		
	Fist of the North Star		2D	2D				Arc System Works		
	Fist of the North Star: 10 Big Brawls for the King of the Universe		2D	2D			Anime	Shouei System		
	Fist of the North Star: The Twin Blue Stars of Judgment		2D	2D			Anime	Arc System Works		
	Fist+ / Exploding Fist +		2D	2D				Beam Software		
	Flash Hiders		2D	2D				Right Stuff		
	Flying Dragon		3D	3D		RPG	Chibi	Culture Brain		
	FOOTSIES		2D	2D				HiFight		
	FOOTSIES: Rollback Edition		2D	2D				HiFight		
	Fraymakers		2D	2D		Platform fighter		Team Fray, McLeodGaming		
	Fullmetal Alchemist: Dream Carnival		2D	3D				Bandai, Eighting		
	Fuuka Taisen		2D	2D				Rei no Mono		
	FX Fighter		3D	3D				Argonaut Games		
	FX Fighter Turbo		3D	3D				Argonaut Games		
	G.A.S.P!! Fighters' NEXTream		3D	3D				Konami Computer Entertainment Osaka		
	Galactic Warriors		2D	2D				Konami		
	Galaxy Fight: Universal Warriors		2D	2D				Sunsoft		
	Ganryu		2D	3D				Visco		
	Garou: Mark of the Wolves		2D	2D				SNK		
	Genei Tougi: Shadow Struggle		3D	3D				Racdym		
	GigaBash		3D	3D		Arena fighter		Passion Republic Games		
	Girl Fight		3D	3D				Kung Fu Factory		
	Gladiator		2D	2D				Domark		
	Glove on Fight		2D	2D			Chibi, Anime	French-Bread		
	God of Rock							Modus Studios Brazil, Modus Games		
	Gogetsuji Legends / Power Instinct Legends		2D	2D	Tag team			Atlus		
	Gōketsuji Ichizoku Matsuri Senzo Kuyou		2D	2D				Atlus		
	Golden Axe: The Duel		2D	2D				Sega		
	Gotcha Force		3D	3D		Arena fighter		Capcom		
	Granblue Fantasy Versus		2D	3D		RPG	Anime	Arc System Works		
	Granblue Fantasy Versus: Rising					RPG		Arc System Works		
	The Grim Adventures of Billy & Mandy		3D	3D	4-way	Platform fighter, Arena fighter		Midway		
	Groove Adventure Rave: Fighting Live		3D	3D	4-way	Platform fighter, Arena fighter	Anime	Konami		
	Groove on Fight		2D	2D	Tag team			Atlus		
	Guilty Gear Dust Strikers		2D	2D		Platform fighter	Anime	Arc System Works		
	Guilty Gear Isuka		2D	2D			Anime	Sammy		
	Guilty Gear Petit						Chibi	Arc System Works		
	Guilty Gear Petit 2						Chibi	Arc System Works		
	Guilty Gear Strive		2D	3D			Anime, Crossover	Arc System Works		
	Guilty Gear X		2D	2D			Anime	Arc System Works		
	Guilty Gear X2		2D	2D			Anime	Arc System Works		
	Guilty Gear Xrd		2D	3D			Anime	Arc System Works		
	Guilty Gear: Dust Strikers		2D	2D	4-way			Arc System Works		
	Guilty Gear: The Missing Link		2D	2D			Anime	Arc System Works		
	Hana no Keiji: Kumo no Kanata ni		2D	2D				Yojigen		
	Head to Head Karate		2D	2D				Softdisk Publishing		
	Heaven's Gate		3D	3D				Racdym		
	Hellish Quart		3D	3D				Kubold		
	Hercules: Slayer of the Damned		2D	2D				Gremlin Graphics		
	Highlander		2D	2D				Ocean		
	Hinokakera		3D	3D			Anime	Reddish Region		
	Hitman Reborn! DS: Flame Rumble		2D	2D				Tomy		
	Holosseum		2D	2D				Sega		
	Hopeless Masquerade (Touhou Project 13.5)		2D	2D				Twilight Frontier, Team Shanghai Alice		
	Human Killing Machine / HKM		2D	2D				Tiertex		
	Hunter x Hunter Nen Impact		2D	3D			Anime	Bushiroad, Eighting		
	Hyper Street Fighter II: The Anniversary Edition		2D	2D				Capcom		
	Icons: Combat Arena		2D	3D		Platform fighter		Wavedash Games		
	Immaterial and Missing Power		2D	2D				Twilight Frontier, Team Shanghai Alice		
	Injustice 2		2D	3D			Crossover	Warner Bros. Interactive Entertainment, NetherRealm Studios		
	Injustice: Gods Among Us		2D	3D			Crossover	Warner Bros. Interactive Entertainment, NetherRealm Studios		
	Insane Paine		2D	2D				Blast Process Games		
	International Karate / World Karate Championship		2D	2D				System 3		
	IK+ / International Karate + / Chop N' Drop		2D	2D				System 3		
	InuYasha: A Feudal Fairy Tale		2D	2D				Bandai		
	Invincible VS		2D	3D	Tag team			Quarter Up, Skybound Games		
	Iron and Blood		3D	3D				Take-Two Interactive		
	Istanbul Beyleri		2D	2D				AKEMRE		
	Istanbul Beyleri 2		2D	2D				AKEMRE		
	J-Stars Victory VS		3D	3D		Arena fighter	Anime, Crossover	Spike Chunsoft, Bandai Namco		
	JoJo's Bizarre Adventure		2D	2D			Anime	Capcom		
	JoJo's Bizarre Adventure: All Star Battle		3D	3D			Anime, Crossover	CyberConnect2, Bandai Namco		
	JoJo's Bizarre Adventure: All Star Battle R		3D	3D	Tag Team		Anime	CyberConnect2, Bandai Namco		
	JoJo's Bizarre Adventure: Eyes of Heaven		3D	3D	4-way	Platform fighter, Arena fighter	Anime	CyberConnect2, Bandai Namco		
	JoJo's Bizarre Adventure: Heritage for The Future		2D	2D			Anime	Capcom		
	Joy Mech Fight		2D	2D			Mecha	Nintendo		
	Jujutsu Kaisen: Cursed Clash		3D	3D	Tag team	Arena fighter	Anime	Byking, Gemdrops, Bandai Namco		
	Jump Force		3D	3D	Tag team	Arena fighter	Anime, Crossover	Spike Chunsoft, Bandai Namco		
	Jump Super Stars		2D	2D	4-way	Platform fighter	Anime, Crossover	Ganbarion		
	Jump Ultimate Stars		2D	2D	4-way	Platform fighter	Anime, Crossover	Ganbarion		
	Justice League Task Force		2D	2D				Blizzard Entertainment		
	Kabuki Klash: Far East Of Eden		2D	2D				Hudson Soft		
	Kabuki Warriors		3D	3D				Genki, Lightweight		
	Kaiser Knuckle / Global Champion / Dan-Ku-Ga		2D	2D				Taito		
	Kakuto Chojin: Back Alley Brutal		3D	3D				Dream Publishing		
	Kamen Rider: Dragon Knight		3D	3D		Arena fighter		Eighting		
	Kanon and AIR Smash		2D	2D		Platform fighter		micro dream studio++		
	Karate		2D	2D				Ultravision		
	Karate Champ		2D	2D				Technos Japan Corporation		
	Karate Combat		2D	2D				Superior Software		
	Karate Master Knock Down Blow		2D	2D				Crian Soft		
	Karateka		2D	2D				Jordan Mechner		
	Kart Fighter		2D	2D				Cracked game featuring Mario		
	Kasumi Ninja		2D	2D				Hand Made Software		
	Kengo		3D	3D				Genki		
	Kensei: Sacred Fist		3D	3D				Konami		
	Keriotosse!		3D	3D		Platform fighter		Taya		
	Kick Box Vigilante		2D	2D				Zeppelin		
	Kidou Butoden G-Gundam		2D	2D			Anime	Sunrise, Bandai		
	Kill la Kill the Game: IF		3D	3D		Arena fighter	Anime	A+ Games, Arc System Works		
	Killer Instinct		2D	2D				Rare		
	Killer Instinct (2013)		2D	3D				Double Helix Games, Iron Galaxy Studios		
	Killer Instinct 2		2D	2D				Rare		
	Killer Instinct Gold		2D	2D				Rare		
	The Killing Blade		2D	2D	Tag team			IGS		
	Killing Zone		3D	3D				Naxat Soft		
	Xuan Dou Zhi Wang / King of Combat		2D	2D				Jade Studio and Tencent Games		
	The King of Fighters '94 / The King of Fighters '94 Re-Bout		2D	2D			Crossover	SNK, Eolith, BrezzaSoft, Noise Factory		
	The King of Fighters '95		2D	2D			Crossover	SNK, Eolith, BrezzaSoft, Noise Factory		
	The King of Fighters '96		2D	2D			Crossover	SNK, Eolith, BrezzaSoft, Noise Factory		
	The King of Fighters '97		2D	2D			Crossover	SNK, Eolith, BrezzaSoft, Noise Factory		
	The King of Fighters '98		2D	2D			Crossover	SNK, Eolith, BrezzaSoft, Noise Factory		
	The King of Fighters '99		2D	2D			Crossover	SNK, Eolith, BrezzaSoft, Noise Factory		
	The King of Fighters 2000		2D	2D			Crossover	SNK, Eolith, BrezzaSoft, Noise Factory		
	The King of Fighters 2001		2D	2D			Crossover	SNK, Eolith, BrezzaSoft, Noise Factory		
	The King of Fighters 2002		2D	2D			Crossover	SNK, Eolith, BrezzaSoft, Noise Factory		
	The King of Fighters 2003		2D	2D	Tag team		Crossover	SNK, Eolith, BrezzaSoft, Noise Factory		
	The King of Fighters All Star					RPG		Netmarble , SNK		
	The King of Fighters Neowave		2D	2D			Crossover	SNK, Eolith, BrezzaSoft, Noise Factory		
	King of Fighters R-1						Chibi, Crossover	SNK, Eolith, BrezzaSoft, Noise Factory		
	King of Fighters R-2						Chibi, Crossover	SNK, Eolith, BrezzaSoft, Noise Factory		
	The King of Fighters XI		2D	2D	Tag team		Crossover	SNK, Eolith, BrezzaSoft, Noise Factory		
	The King of Fighters XII		2D	2D			Crossover	SNK, Eolith, BrezzaSoft, Noise Factory		
	The King of Fighters XIII		2D	2D			Crossover	SNK, Eolith, BrezzaSoft, Noise Factory		
	The King of Fighters XIV		2D	3D			Crossover	SNK, Eolith, BrezzaSoft, Noise Factory		
	The King of Fighters XV		2D	3D			Crossover	SNK, Eolith, BrezzaSoft, Noise Factory		
	The King of Fighters: Maximum Impact						Crossover	SNK, Eolith, BrezzaSoft, Noise Factory		
	The King of Fighters: Maximum Impact 2 / The King of Fighters: Maximum Impact Regulation-A						Crossover	SNK, Eolith, BrezzaSoft, Noise Factory		
	Kirby Fighters 2		2D	3D	4-way	Platform fighter		Nintendo, HAL Laboratory, Vanpool		
	Kizuna Encounter		2D	2D				SNK		
	Kizuna Encounter: Super Tag Battle		2D	2D	Tag team			SNK		
	Knight Games		2D	2D				English Software		
	Knuckle Heads		2D	2D				Namco		
	Konjiki no Gash Bell Yuujou no Zakeru 2		2D	2D				Banpresto		
	Konjiki no Gash Bell Yuujou no Zakeru Dream Tag Tournament		2D	2D	Tag team			Banpresto		
	Konjiki no Gash Bell!! Go! Go! Mamono Fight!!		2D	3D	4-way	Platform fighter		Eighting, 8ing		
	Kung Fu Chaos		3D	3D		Platform fighter, Arena fighter		Just Add Monsters, Microsoft Game Studios		
	Kung Fu Panda: Showdown of Legendary Legends		2D	3D		Platform fighter		Vicious Cycle Software		
	The Kung-Fu Master Jackie Chan / Jackie Chan in Fists of Fire: Jackie Chan Densetsu		2D	2D				Kaneko		
	The Way of the Exploding Fist / Kung-Fu: The Way of the Exploding Fist		2D	2D				Beam Software		
	The Last Blade		2D	2D				SNK		
	The Last Blade 2		2D	2D				SNK		
	Last Bronx		3D	3D				Sega AM3		
	Last Fight		2D	2D				Andromeda Software		
	Legaia 2: Duel Saga					RPG				
	Legend of Legaia					RPG				
	Legend of the Dragon		3D	3D				The Game Factory		
	Hokuto no Ken: Raoh Gaiden – Ten no Haoh		3D	3D			Anime	Interchannel, Arc System Works		
	Lethal League		2D	2D	4-way	Platform fighter, Sports		Team Reptile		
	Lethal League Blaze		2D	3D	4-way	Platform fighter, Sports		Team Reptile		
	Lightning Legend: Daigo no Daibouken		3D	3D				Konami Computer Entertainment Tokyo		
	Loons: The Fight for Fame		3D	3D		Arena fighter		warthog games		
	M.U.G.E.N		2D	2D				Elecbyte		
	Mace: The Dark Age		3D	3D				Midway		
	Magical Battle Arena		3D	3D				Fly-System, AreaZERO		
	Makeruna! Makendō 2: Kimero Youkai Souri		2D	2D				Success, Fill-in-Cafe		
	Mär Heaven: Arm Fight Dream		3D	3D			Anime	Alpha Unit		
	Maribato!		2D	2D				DK Soft		
	Martial Arts: Capoeira		3D	3D				Twelve Interactive		
	Martial Champion		2D	2D				Konami		
	Martial Masters		2D	2D				IGS		
	Marvel Avengers: Battle for Earth		3D	3D	Tag team	Arena fighter, RPG	Crossover	Ubisoft		
	Marvel Nemesis: Rise of the Imperfects		3D	3D		Arena fighter	Crossover	Nihilistic Software, EA Canada, Team Fusion		
	Marvel Super Hero Squad						Chibi	THQ		
	Marvel Super Heroes		2D	2D				Capcom		
	Marvel Super Heroes vs. Street Fighter		2D	2D			Crossover	Capcom		
	Marvel Tokon: Fighting Souls		2D	3D	Tag team		Crossover	Arc System Works, Sony Interactive		
	Marvel vs. Capcom 2: New Age of Heroes		2D	2D			Crossover	Capcom		
	Marvel vs. Capcom 3: Fate of Two Worlds		2D	3D	Tag team		Crossover	Capcom		
	Marvel vs. Capcom: Clash of Super Heroes		2D	2D			Crossover	Capcom		
	Marvel vs. Capcom: Infinite		2D	3D	Tag team		Crossover	Capcom		
	Mashbox		2D	3D			Crossover	Microsoft Studios		
	Master Axe: The Genesis of MysterX		2D	2D				Axe to Grind		
	Master Ninja: Shadow Warrior of Death		2D	2D				Paragon Software		
	Masters of Combat		2D	2D				SIMS Co., Ltd.		
	Matrimelee		2D	2D				Atlus		
	Matsumura Kunihiro Den: Saikyō no Rekishi o Nurikaero!		2D	2D				Shouei		
	Melty Blood		2D	2D			Anime	Type-Moon, French-Bread		
	Melty Blood: Type Lumina		2D	2D			Anime	Type-Moon, French-Bread, Ecole Software, Lasengle		
	Metal & Lace: Battle of the Robo Babes		2D	2D				Forest		
	Mighty Fight Federation		3D	3D		Arena fighter		Komi Games Inc		
	Mighty Morphin Power Rangers (Sega Game Gear)		2D	2D				Sega		
	Mighty Morphin Power Rangers (Sega Genesis)		2D	2D				Sega		
	Mighty Morphin Power Rangers: The Fighting Edition		2D	2D			Mecha	Bandai		
	Mighty Morphin Power Rangers: The Movie (Sega Game Gear)		2D	2D				Sega		
	Mighty Warriors		2D	2D				Electronic Devices, Electtronica Video-Games SRL		
	Million Arthur: Arcana Blood		2D	2D				Examu, Team Arcana		
	Million Knights Vermilion		2D	2D				NRF Software		
	Mobile Suit Gundam (1993)		2D	2D			Anime	Sunrise, Banpresto		
	Mobile Suit Gundam: EX Revue		2D	2D			Anime	Sunrise, Banpresto		
	Monster		2D	2D				8105 Graphics		
	Moorhen Battle Arena		2D	2D				Mobile Scope		
	Mortal Kombat		2D	2D				Midway		
	Mortal Kombat		2D	3D	Tag team		Crossover	Warner Bros. Interactive Entertainment, NetherRealm Studios		
	Mortal Kombat 1		2D	3D			Crossover	Warner Bros. Interactive Entertainment, NetherRealm Studios		
	Mortal Kombat 11		2D	3D			Crossover	Warner Bros. Interactive Entertainment, NetherRealm Studios		
	Mortal Kombat 3		2D	2D				Midway		
	Mortal Kombat 4		3D	3D				Midway, Warner Bros. Interactive Entertainment, NetherRealm Studios		
	Mortal Kombat II		2D	2D				Midway		
	Mortal Kombat Trilogy		2D	2D				Midway		
	Mortal Kombat vs. DC Universe		3D	3D			Crossover	Midway, Warner Bros. Interactive Entertainment, NetherRealm Studios		
	Mortal Kombat X		2D	3D			Crossover	Warner Bros. Interactive Entertainment, NetherRealm Studios		
	Mortal Kombat: Armageddon		3D	3D				Midway, Warner Bros. Interactive Entertainment, NetherRealm Studios		
	Mortal Kombat: Deadly Alliance		3D	3D				Midway, Warner Bros. Interactive Entertainment, NetherRealm Studios		
	Mortal Kombat: Deception		3D	3D				Midway, Warner Bros. Interactive Entertainment, NetherRealm Studios		
	Moshi Fighters		2D	3D				Mind Candy, Activision, Sumo Digital		
	MultiVersus		2D	3D	4-way	Platform fighter	Crossover	Warner Bros. Interactive Entertainment, Player First Games		
	My Hero One's Justice		3D	3D		Arena fighter		Byking		
	Mythic Blades		2D	3D				Vermillion Entertainment		
	Naruto Shippuden: Clash of Ninja for Wii U		3D	3D			Anime	Eighting, Takara Tomy		
	Naruto Shippuden: Clash of Ninja Revolution 3		3D	3D	Tag team, 4-way		Anime	Eighting, D3 Publisher, Tomy		
	Naruto Shippūden: Gekitō Ninja Taisen! EX		3D	3D	4-way		Anime	Eighting, Tomy		
	Naruto Shippūden: Gekitō Ninja Taisen! EX 2		3D	3D	4-way		Anime	Eighting, Tomy		
	Naruto Shippūden: Gekitō Ninja Taisen! EX 3		3D	3D	4-way		Anime	Eighting, Tomy		
	Naruto Shippūden: Gekitō Ninja Taisen! Special		3D	3D	Tag team, 4-way		Anime	Eighting, Tomy		
	Naruto Shippūden: Ninjutsu Zenkai! Cha-Crash!!		2D	2D	4-way					
	Naruto Shippuden: Ultimate Ninja Storm 2		3D	3D		Arena fighter	Anime	CyberConnect2, Bandai Namco		
	Naruto Shippuden: Ultimate Ninja Storm 3		3D	3D		Arena fighter	Anime	CyberConnect2, Bandai Namco		
	Naruto Shippuden: Ultimate Ninja Storm 4		3D	3D		Arena fighter		CyberConnect2, Bandai Namco		
	Naruto Shippuden: Ultimate Ninja Storm Generations		3D	3D		Arena fighter	Anime	CyberConnect2, Bandai Namco		
	Naruto Shippuden: Ultimate Ninja Storm Revolution		3D	3D		Arena fighter	Anime	CyberConnect2, Bandai Namco		
	Naruto x Boruto: Ultimate Ninja Storm Connections		3D	3D		Arena fighter		CyberConnect2, Bandai Namco		
	Naruto: Clash of Ninja 2		3D	3D	4-way		Anime	Eighting, Tomy		
	Naruto: Clash of Ninja Revolution		3D	3D	4-way		Anime	Eighting, Tomy		
	Naruto: Clash of Ninja Revolution 2		3D	3D	Tag team, 4-way		Anime	Eighting, D3 Publisher, Tomy		
	Naruto: Gekitou Ninja Taisen 3		3D	3D	Tag team, 4-way		Anime	Eighting, Tomy		
	Naruto: Gekitou Ninja Taisen 4		3D	3D	Tag team, 4-way		Anime	Eighting, Tomy		
	Naruto: Ultimate Ninja Storm		3D	3D		Arena fighter	Anime	CyberConnect2, Bandai Namco		
	Neo Geo Battle Coliseum		2D	2D	Tag team		Crossover	SNK		
	New Mobile Report Gundam Wing: Endless Duel							Natsume		
	Neon Genesis Evangelion: Battle Orchestra		2D	3D	4-way	Platform fighter	Mecha	Headlock		
	New Mobile Report Gundam Wing: Endless Duel		2D	2D				Natsume		
	Nickelodeon All-Star Brawl		2D	3D	4-way	Platform fighter	Crossover	GameMill Entertainment, Ludosity, Fair Play Labs		
	Nickelodeon All-Star Brawl 2		2D	3D	4-way	Platform fighter	Crossover	GameMill Entertainment, Ludosity, Fair Play Labs		
	Night Warriors: Darkstalkers' Revenge		2D	2D				Capcom		
	Ninja / Ninja Mission		2D	2D				Entertainment USA, Mastertronic		
	Ninja Hamster		2D	2D				CRL		
	Ninja Master's		2D	2D				ADK		
	Ninja Master's -Haoh-Ninpo-Cho-		2D	2D				Alpha Denshi		
	Nitroplus Blasterz: Heroines Infinite Duel		2D	2D			Anime, Crossover	Nitroplus, Examu, Team Arcana		
	No Exit		2D	2D				Titus, Tomahawk		
	Ōgon Musōkyoku		2D	2D				07th Expansion		
	Omen of Sorrow		2D	3D				AOne Games		
	One Must Fall: 2097		2D	2D			Mecha	Epic Games		
	One Must Fall: Battlegrounds		3D	3D				Diversions Entertainment		
	One Piece: Burning Blood		3D	3D	Tag team		Anime	Bandai Namco		
	One Piece: Gear Spirit		2D	3D	4-way	Platform fighter	Anime	Bandai		
	One Piece: Grand Adventure		3D	3D			Anime	Bandai Namco		
	One Piece: Grand Battle		3D	3D			Anime	Bandai		
	One Piece: Grand Battle!		2D	3D			Anime	Bandai		
	One-Punch Man: A Hero Nobody Knows		3D	3D	Tag team	Arena fighter	Anime	Spike Chunsoft, Bandai Namco		
	Onimusha Blade Warriors		2D	3D		Platform fighter		Capcom		
	Osu!! Karate Bu		2D	2D				Culture Brain		
	The Outfoxies		2D	2D		Platform fighter		Namco		
	Suiko Enbu-Fuun Saiki		2D	2D				Data East		
	Outlaws of the Lost Dynasty / Suiko Enbu/Dark Legend		2D	2D				Data East		
	Override 2: Super Mech League		3D	3D		Arena fighter		Modus Studios Brazil		
	Paperbound		2D	2D		Platform fighter		Dissident Logic		
	Persona 4 Arena		2D	2D		RPG	Anime	Arc System Works, Atlus		
	Persona 4 Arena Ultimax		2D	2D		RPG	Anime	Arc System Works, Atlus		
	Phantom Breaker		2D	2D			Anime, Crossover	Mages		
	Phantom Breaker: Extra		2D	2D			Anime, Crossover	Mages		
	Phantom Breaker: Omnia		2D	2D			Anime, Crossover	Mages		
	Photo Dojo		2D	2D				Nintendo		
	Pit-Fighter: The Ultimate Competition		2D	2D				Atari Games		
	Plasma Sword: Nightmare of Bilstein		3D	3D				Capcom		
	PlayStation All-Stars Battle Royale		2D	3D	4-way	Platform fighter	Crossover	SuperBot Entertainment, Sony Computer Entertainment		
	Pocket Kanon & Air		3D	3D		Platform fighter		Studio SiestA		
	Pokkén Tournament		3D	3D		Arena fighter, RPG	Anime	Bandai Namco, Nintendo		
	Power Instinct		2D	2D				Atlus		
	Power Instinct 2		2D	2D				Atlus		
	Power Moves		2D	2D				Kaneko		
	Power Quest		2D	2D				Japan System Supply, Sunsoft		
	Power Rangers: Battle for the Grid		2D	3D	Tag team			Animoca Brands		
	Power Stone		3D	3D		Platform fighter, Arena fighter		Capcom		
	Power Stone 2		3D	3D	4-way	Platform fighter, Arena fighter		Capcom		
	Poy Poy		3D	3D		Platform fighter		Konami		
	Poy Poy 2		3D	3D		Platform fighter		Konami		
	Pray For Death		2D	2D				Virgin Interactive		
	Project Cerberus		2D	2D				Hobibox, Milestone		
	Project Justice		3D	3D				Capcom		
	Psychic Force		3D	3D			Anime, Flyting	Taito		
	Psychic Force 2012		3D	3D			Anime, Flyting	Taito		
	Punch Planet		2D	3D				Sector-K Games		
	Queen of Heart		2D	2D				Watanabe Seisakujo		
	RABBIT		2D	2D				Aorn, Electronic Arts		
	Rage of the Dragons		2D	2D	Tag team			Evoga, Noise Factory		
	Raging Fighter		2D	2D				Konami		
	Ragnagard/Shin-Oh-Ken		2D	2D				Saurus, System Vision		
	Rakugaki Showtime		3D	3D		Platform fighter		Treasure		
	Rakugakids		2D	3D				Konami		
	Ranma ½: Battle Renaissance		2D	2D				Rumic Soft		
	Ranma ½: Chōnai Gekitōhen		2D	2D				NCS		
	Ranma ½: Chougi Rambuhen		2D	2D				Rumic Soft		
	Ranma ½: Datou, Ganso Musabetsu Kakutou-ryuu!		2D	2D				NCS		
	Real Bout Fatal Fury		2D	2D				SNK		
	Real Bout Fatal Fury 2: The Newcomers		2D	2D				SNK		
	Real Bout Fatal Fury Special		2D	2D				SNK		
	Real Bout Garou Densetsu Special: Dominated Mind		2D	2D				SNK		
	Real Steel					Sports (boxing)	Mecha	Yuke's		
	Red Earth / Warzard		2D	2D		RPG		Capcom		
	Revengers of Vengeance		2D	2D		RPG		Micronet co., Ltd., Extreme Entertainment Group		
	Rise 2: Resurrection		2D				Mecha	Mirage Media, Acclaim Entertainment		
	Rise of the Robots						Mecha	Mirage Media, Time Warner Interactive		
	Rising Thunder		2D	3D			Mecha	Radiant Entertainment		
	Rival Schools: United By Fate		3D	3D				Capcom		
	Rivals of Aether		2D	2D		Platform fighter		Dan Fornace		
	Robo Pit		3D	3D				Kokopeli		
	Robopit						Mecha	Kokopeli Digital Studios, Altron		
	Rock, Paper, Scissors: Extreme Deathmatch		2D	2D				This is Pop		
	Roof Rage		2D	2D		Platform fighter		Early Melon		
	Rumble Arena		2D	3D		Platform fighter		Rekall Games		
	The Rumble Fish		2D	2D				Dimps		
	The Rumble Fish 2		2D	2D				Dimps		
	Rushdown Revolt		2D	3D		Platform fighter		Vortex Games		
	Sai Combat		2D	2D				Mirrorsoft		
	Saint Seiya: Brave Soldiers		3D	3D		Arena fighter		Dimps		
	Saint Seiya: Soldiers' Soul		3D	3D		Arena fighter	Anime	Dimps		
	Samurai Deeper Kyo		2D	2D			Anime	Bandai		
	Samurai Shodown		2D	2D				SNK		
	Samurai Shodown (2019)		2D	3D			Crossover	SNK		
	Samurai Shodown 64		3D	3D				SNK		
	Samurai Shodown 64: Warriors Rage		3D	3D				SNK		
	Samurai Shodown II		2D	2D				SNK		
	Samurai Shodown III: Blades of Blood		2D	2D				SNK		
	Samurai Shodown IV: Amakusa's Revenge		2D	2D				SNK		
	Samurai Shodown Sen/Edge of Destiny		3D	3D				SNK		
	Samurai Shodown V		2D	2D				SNK		
	Samurai Shodown V Perfect		2D	2D				SNK		
	Samurai Shodown V Special		2D	2D				SNK		
	Samurai Shodown VI		2D	2D				SNK		
	Samurai Shodown: Warriors Rage		3D	3D				SNK		
	Samurai Shodown!		2D	2D				SNK		
	Samurai Shodown! 2		2D	2D				SNK		
	Samurai Trilogy		2D	2D				Gremlin Graphics		
	Sango Fighter		2D	2D				Panda Entertainment		
	Sango Fighter 2		2D	2D				Panda Entertainment		
	Sarayin Esrari							Akemre		
	Savage Reign		2D	2D				SNK		
	Savage Warriors		2D	2D				Mindscape		
	Scarlet Weather Rhapsody (Touhou Project 10.5)		2D	2D				Twilight Frontier, Team Shanghai Alice		
	Schmeiser Robo		2D	2D				Hot B Co. Ltd.		
	SD Hiryū no Ken						Chibi	Culture Brain		
	SD Hiryū no Ken Densetsu						Chibi	Culture Brain		
	SD Hiryū no Ken EX						Chibi	Culture Brain		
	SD Hiryū no Ken Gaiden						Chibi	Culture Brain		
	SD Hiryū no Ken SD Hiryū no Ken Gaiden 2						Chibi	Culture Brain		
	Seifuku Densetsu Pretty Fighter		2D	2D				Genki, Sol		
	Sengoku Basara X		2D	2D				Capcom, Arc System Works		
	Shadow Fight		2D	2D				Nekki		
	Shadow Fight 3		2D	3D				Banzai.Games		
	Shadow Fight Arena		2D	3D				Banzai.Games		
	Shadow Fighter		2D	2D				Gremlin Graphics		
	Shadow: War of Succession		2D	2D				Tribeca Digital Studios		
	Shaman King: Funbari Spirits		2D	3D				Dimps		
	Shaman King: Spirit of Shamans		2D	2D				Dimps		
	Shanghai Karate		2D	2D				Players		
	Shaolin		3D	3D		RPG		THQ		
	Shaq-Fu		2D	2D				Delphine		
	Shijō Saikyō no Deshi Kenichi: Gekitō! Ragnarok Hachikengō		3D	3D		Arena fighter	Anime	Capcom		
	Shin Goketsuji Ichizoku: Bonnou no Kaihou		2D	2D			Crossover	Atlus		
	Shin Kidō Senki Gundam Wing: Endless Duel		2D	2D			Anime, Mecha	Natsume Atari, Bandai		
	Shin Koihime Musō: Otome Taisen Sangokushi Engi		2D	2D				BaseSon		
	Shogun Warriors / Fujiyama Buster		2D	2D				Kaneko		
	Shovel Knight Showdown		2D	2D		Platform fighter		Yacht Club Games		
	Shrek SuperSlam		3D	3D	4-way	Platform fighter, Arena fighter		Activision		
	Shrek: Fairy Tale Freakdown		2D	2D		Platform fighter		Prolific		
	Skullgirls		2D	2D	Tag team		Anime	Reverge Labs, Lab Zero Games, Hidden Variable Studios, Future Club		
	Slap City		2D	3D		Platform fighter		Ludosity		
	Slap Happy Rhythm Busters		2D	3D				Polygon Magic		
	SnapDragon / Karate Chop		2D	2D				Bubble Bus		
	SNK Gals' Fighters		2D	2D			Chibi, Crossover	SNK, Yumekobo		
	SNK Heroines: Tag Team Frenzy		2D	3D	Tag team		Crossover	SNK, Abstraction Games		
	SNK vs. Capcom: SVC Chaos						Crossover	Capcom / SNK		
	SNK vs. Capcom: The Match of the Millennium		2D	2D	Tag team		Chibi, Crossover	Capcom, SNK		
	Sokko Seitokai: Sonic Council		2D	2D				Banpresto		
	Solitary Fighter / Violence Fight II		2D	2D				Taito		
	Sonic Battle		3D	3D	4-way	Platform fighter, Arena fighter		Sega, Sonic Team		
	Sonic The Fighters		3D	3D				Sega-AM2		
	Soul Eater: Battle Resonance		2D	3D			Anime	Bandai, Bandai Namco		
	Soul Edge		3D	3D				Namco, Bandai Namco		
	Soulcalibur		3D	3D				Namco, Bandai Namco		
	Soulcalibur II		3D	3D			Crossover	Namco, Bandai Namco, Project Soul		
	Soulcalibur III		3D	3D				Namco, Bandai Namco		
	Soulcalibur IV / Soulcalibur II HD Online		3D	3D			Crossover	Namco, Bandai Namco, Project Soul		
	Soulcalibur Legends						Crossover	Namco, Bandai Namco, Project Soul		
	Soulcalibur V		3D	3D			Crossover	Namco, Bandai Namco, Project Soul		
	Soulcalibur VI		3D	3D			Crossover	Namco, Bandai Namco, Project Soul		
	Soulcalibur: Broken Destiny		3D	3D			Crossover	Namco, Bandai Namco, Project Soul		
	Soulcalibur: Lost Swords		3D	3D				Namco, Bandai Namco		
	Spawn: In the Demon's Hand		3D	3D	4-way	Arena fighter		Capcom		
	Spectral vs. Generation		2D	2D				Idea Factory, IGS		
	Spitting Image		2D	2D				Domark		
	Squirrel Kombat		2D	2D		Platform fighter		Monkey Farm Software		
	Stake: Fortune Fighters		3D	3D		Platform fighter		Gameness		
	Star Gladiator		3D	3D				Capcom		
	Star Wars: Masters of Teras Kasi		3D	3D				LucasArts		
	Star Wars: The Clone Wars - Lightsaber Duels		3D	3D		Arena fighter		LucasArts, Lucasfilm Games		
	Street Combat		2D	2D				NCS		
	Street Fighter		2D	2D				Capcom		
	Street Fighter 6		2D	3D			Crossover	Capcom		
	Street Fighter Alpha 2		2D	2D				Capcom		
	Street Fighter Alpha 2 Gold		2D	2D				Capcom		
	Street Fighter Alpha 3		2D	2D				Capcom		
	Street Fighter Alpha Anthology		2D	2D				Capcom		
	Street Fighter Alpha: Warriors' Dreams		2D	2D				Capcom		
	Street Fighter EX		3D	3D				Arika, Capcom		
	Street Fighter EX Plus		3D	3D				Arika, Capcom		
	Street Fighter EX Plus α		3D	3D				Arika, Capcom		
	Street Fighter EX2		3D	3D				Arika, Capcom		
	Street Fighter EX2 Plus		3D	3D				Arika, Capcom		
	Street Fighter EX3		3D	3D	Tag team			Arika, Capcom		
	Street Fighter II: Champion Edition		2D	2D				Capcom		
	Street Fighter II: Hyper Fighting		2D	2D				Capcom		
	Street Fighter II: The World Warrior		2D	2D				Capcom		
	Street Fighter III		2D	2D				Capcom		
	Street Fighter III: 2nd Impact		2D	2D				Capcom		
	Street Fighter III: 3rd Strike		2D	2D				Capcom		
	Street Fighter IV (2008)		2D	3D				Capcom		
	Street Fighter V		2D	3D			Crossover	Capcom		
	Street Fighter V: Arcade Edition		2D	3D				Capcom		
	Street Fighter V: Champion Edition		2D	3D				Capcom		
	Street Fighter X Tekken		2D	3D	Tag team, 4-way		Crossover	Capcom		
	Street Fighter Zero 2 Alpha		2D	2D				Capcom		
	Street Fighter: The Movie		2D	2D				IT, Capcom		
	Street Smart		2D	2D				SNK		
	Strip Fighter 3 Naked Street King						Eroge	Studio S		
	Strip Fighter 5						Eroge	Studio S		
	Strip Fighter 5 Abnormal Edition						Eroge	Studio S		
	Strip Fighter 5 Chimpocon Edition						Eroge	Studio S		
	Strip Fighter II						Eroge	Games Express		
	Strip Fighter IV						Eroge	Studio S		
	Strip Fighter IV Rainbow						Eroge	Studio S		
	Suggoi! Arcana Heart 2		2D	2D			Anime	Examu		
	Sugoi Hebereke		2D	2D		Platform fighter		Sunsoft		
	Sumo Wrestlers		2D	2D				HES		
	Sunday vs Magazine: Shūketsu! Chōjō Daikessen		2D	3D			Anime, Crossover	Konami		
	Super Black Belt Karate		2D	2D				Computer Applications		
	Super Chinese Fighter		2D	2D				Culture Brain		
	Super Chinese Fighter EX		2D	2D				Culture Brain		
	Super Chinese Fighter GB		2D	2D				Culture Brain		
	Super Cosplay War Ultra		2D	2D				Team FK		
	Super Dragon Ball Z		3D	3D		Arena fighter	Anime	Namco Bandai Games, Bandai		
	Super Drink Bros.		3D	3D		Arena fighter		nekogameteacher		
	Super Fighter		2D	2D				C&E		
	Super Gem Fighter Mini Mix / Pocket Fighter		2D	2D			Chibi, Crossover	Capcom		
	Super Robot Spirits						Mecha	Banpresto		
	Super Smash Bros.	N64	2D	3D	4-way	Platform fighter	Crossover	HAL Laboratory	Nintendo	
	Super Smash Bros. Brawl	Wii	2D	3D	4-way	Platform fighter	Crossover	HAL Laboratory	Nintendo	
	Super Smash Bros. for Nintendo 3DS and Wii U	3DS, WiiU	2D	3D	4-way, 8-way	Platform fighter	Crossover	Sora, Bandai Namco Studios	Nintendo	
	Super Smash Bros. Melee	GCN	2D	3D	4-way	Platform fighter	Crossover	HAL Laboratory	Nintendo	
	Super Smash Bros. Ultimate	NS	2D	3D	4-way, 8-way	Platform fighter	Crossover	Sora, Bandai Namco Studios	Nintendo	
	Super Street Fighter II Turbo		2D	2D				Capcom		
	Super Street Fighter II Turbo HD Remix		2D	2D				Capcom		
	Super Street Fighter II: The New Challengers		2D	2D				Capcom		
	Super Street Fighter IV (2010)		2D	3D				Capcom		
	Super Street Fighter IV: 3D Edition		2D	3D				Capcom		
	Super Street Fighter IV: Arcade Edition		2D	3D				Capcom		
	Super Strip Fighter IV						Eroge	Studio S		
	Superior Soldiers / Perfect Soldiers		2D	2D				Irem		
	Survival Arts		2D	2D				Sammy		
	Suzumiya Haruhi no Chourantou		3D	3D		Platform fighter		Souvenir Circ.		
	Suzumiya Haruhi no Gekitou		3D	3D		Platform fighter		Souvenir Circ.		
	Swashbuckler		2D	2D				Paul Stephenson		
	Sword Slayer / Spartacus the Swordslayer		2D	2D				Players		
	Taekwon-Do		2D	2D				Human Entertainment		
	Tales of VS.		2D	3D		Platform fighter		Matrix Software		
	Tamagotchi Battle		2D	3D				Bandai Namco Games, Bandai		
	Tao Feng: Fist of the Lotus		3D	3D				Studio Gigante		
	Tao Taido		2D	2D				Video System		
	Tatsunoko Fight		2D	2D			Anime, Crossover	Takara		
	Tatsunoko vs. Capcom		2D	3D	Tag team		Anime, Crossover	Capcom, Eighting		
	Tatsunoko vs. Capcom: Cross Generation of Heroes		2D	3D			Anime, Crossover	Capcom		
	Tatsunoko vs. Capcom: Ultimate All-Stars		2D	3D			Anime, Crossover	Capcom		
	Tattoo Assassins		2D	2D				Data East		
	Tech Romancer		3D	3D			Mecha	Capcom		
	Teenage Mutant Ninja Turtles: Mutant Melee		3D	3D	4-way	Platform fighter		Konami		
	Teenage Mutant Ninja Turtles: Smash-Up		2D	3D	4-way	Platform fighter	Crossover	Ubisoft, Game Arts		
	Teenage Mutant Ninja Turtles: Tournament Fighters		2D	2D				Konami		
	Tekken		3D	3D				Namco		
	Tekken 2		3D	3D				Namco		
	Tekken 3		3D	3D			Crossover	Namco, Bandai Namco Studios		
	Tekken 3D: Prime Edition		3D	3D				Namco		
	Tekken 4		3D	3D				Namco		
	Tekken 5		3D	3D				Namco		
	Tekken 5: Dark Resurrection		3D	3D				Namco		
	Tekken 6		3D	3D				Namco		
	Tekken 6: Bloodline Rebellion		3D	3D				Namco		
	Tekken 7		3D	3D			Crossover	Namco, Bandai Namco Studios		
	Tekken 7: Fated Retribution		3D	3D				Namco		
	Tekken 8		3D	3D			Crossover	Namco, Bandai Namco Studios		
	Tekken Advance		3D	3D				Namco		
	Tekken Revolution		3D	3D				Namco		
	Tekken Tag Tournament		3D	3D	Tag team			Namco		
	Tekken Tag Tournament 2		3D	3D	Tag team			Namco		
	Teleroboxer					Sports (boxing)	Mecha	Nintendo R&D3		
	Tenkaichi Bushi Keru Nagūru					RPG		Nekki		
	Tenth Degree		3D	3D				Atari		
	Thai Boxing		2D	2D				Anco Software		
	Thea Realm Fighters		2D	2D				High Voltage Software		
	Theatre Of Pain		3D	3D				Mirage Media		
	Them's Fightin' Herds		2D	2D				Mane6		
	Thrill Kill		3D	3D	4-way			Paradox Development, Virgin Interactive		
	Time Killers		2D	2D				Incredible Technologies, Strata		
	Time Warriors		3D	3D				Silmarils		
	Timeslaughter		2D	2D				Bloodlust Software		
	Tobal 2					RPG				
	Tobal No.1					RPG				
	Tōkidenshō Angel Eyes		2D	2D			Anime	Tecmo		
	Tom and Jerry: War of the Whiskers		3D	3D		Platform fighter		VIS Entertainment		
	Tongue of the Fatman / Mondu's Fight Palace / Slaughter Sport / Fatman		2D	2D				Activision		
	Tough Guy		2D	2D				Panda Entertainment		
	Touhou Hisōtensoku (Touhou Project 12.3)		2D	2D				Twilight Frontier, Team Shanghai Alice		
	Tournament of Legends		3D	3D		Arena fighter		High Voltage Software		
	Toy Fighter		3D	3D				Anchor Inc		
	Transformers: Beast Wars Transmetals		3D	3D				Takara		
	Tuff E Nuff / Dead Dance		2D	2D				Jaleco		
	Twinkle Queen		2D	2D	4-way		Crossover	Milestone		
	Ultimate Body Blows		2D	2D				Team17		
	Ultimate Marvel vs. Capcom 3		2D	3D	Tag team		Crossover	Capcom		
	Ultimate Mortal Kombat 3		2D	2D				Midway		
	Ultra Street Fighter II: The Final Challengers		2D	2D				Capcom		
	Ultra Street Fighter IV		2D	3D				Capcom		
	Ultra Strip Fighter IV Omeco Edition						Eroge	Studio S		
	Ultra Vortek		2D	2D				Atari		
	Ultraman Powered		2D	3D				Bandai		
	Umineko: Golden Fantasia		2D	2D	Tag team		Anime	07th Expansion		
	Under Night In-Birth		2D	2D			Anime, Crossover	Type-Moon, French-Bread, Ecole Software		
	Under Night In-Birth II		2D	2D			Anime	Type-Moon, French-Bread, Ecole Software		
	Under Night In-Birth II [Sys:Celes]		2D	2D			Anime, Crossover	Type-Moon, French-Bread , Ecole Software		
	Untouchable		2D	2D				Creative Edge Studios		
	Urban Champion		2D	2D				Nintendo		
	Urban Legend in Limbo (Touhou Project 14.5)		2D	2D				Twilight Frontier, Team Shanghai Alice		
	Urban Reign		3D	3D		Arena fighter		Namco		
	Vampire Hunter 2: Darkstalkers' Revenge		2D	2D				Capcom		
	Vampire Savior 2: The Lord of Vampire		2D	2D				Capcom		
	Vanguard Princess		2D	2D			Anime	Sugeno		
	Vanguard Princess Prime		2D	2D				Sugeno		
	Variable Geo						Eroge	TGL, Giga		
	Viewtiful Joe: Red Hot Rumble		2D	3D	4-way	Platform fighter		Capcom		
	Violence Fight		2D	2D				Taito		
	Virtua Fighter		3D	3D				Sega-AM2, Ryu Ga Gotoku Studio		
	Virtua Fighter 2							Sega-AM2, Ryu Ga Gotoku Studio		
	Virtua Fighter 3		3D	3D				Sega-AM2, Ryu Ga Gotoku Studio		
	Virtua Fighter 4		3D	3D				Sega-AM2, Ryu Ga Gotoku Studio		
	Virtua Fighter 5		3D	3D				Sega-AM2, Ryu Ga Gotoku Studio		
	Virtua Fighter Animation		2D	2D				Aspect		
	Virtua Fighter Kids						Chibi	Sega-AM2		
	Virtua Quest					RPG				
	Virtual On: Cyber Troopers		3D	3D		Arena fighter		Sega AM3		
	Voltage Fighter Gowcaizer		2D	2D				Technos		
	VR Troopers		2D	2D				Syrox Developments		
	Vs.		3D	3D				THQ		
	Waku Waku 7		2D	2D				Sunsoft		
	War Gods		3D	3D				Midway		
	War of the Monsters		3D	3D		Arena fighter	Kaiju	Incognito Entertainment, Sony		
	Warpath: Jurassic Park		3D	3D				Black Ops Entertainment, DreamWorks Interactive		
	Warriors of Elysia		2D	2D				Creative Edge Studios		
	WarTech: Senko No Ronde						Mecha, Flyting	G.rev		
	Way of the Tiger		2D	2D				Gremlin Graphics		
	Way of the Warrior		2D	2D				Naughty Dog		
	Weaponlord		2D	2D				Visual Concepts, Namco		
	Windy X Windam		2D	2D				Success, Ninja Studio		
	Wu-Tang: Shaolin Style		3D	3D	4-way			Paradox Development, Activision		
	X-Men vs. Street Fighter		2D	2D			Crossover	Capcom		
	X-Men: Children of the Atom		2D	2D				Capcom		
	X-Men: Mutant Academy		3D	3D				Paradox Development, Activision		
	X-Men: Mutant Academy 2		3D	3D				Paradox Development, Activision		
	X-Men: Next Dimension		3D	3D				Paradox Development, Activision		
	X: Unmei no Sentaku		3D	3D				Bandai		
	Xena: Warrior Princess: The Talisman of Fate		3D	3D				Saffire		
	Yatagarasu Attack on Cataclysm		2D	2D			Anime	Yatagarasu Dev Team		
	Yatagarasu Enter the Eastward		2D	2D			Anime	Yatagarasu Dev Team		
	Yie Ar Kung-Fu		2D	2D				Konami, Imagine		
	Yie Ar Kung-Fu II: The Emperor Yie-Gah		2D	2D				Imagine, Konami		
	Your Only Move is Hustle		2D	2D			Anime	Ivy Sly, Yatagarasu Dev Team		
	Ys vs. Trails in the Sky		3D	3D		Arena fighter		Nihon Falcom		
	Yu Yu Hakusho Final		2D	2D				Namcot		
	Yu Yu Hakusho Makyō Tōitsusen		2D	2D	4-way			Treasure		
	Yu Yu Hakusho: Dark Tournament		3D	3D		Arena fighter	Anime	Digital Fiction		
	Zatch Bell! Electric Arena / Konjiki no Gash Bell! Yuujou no Zakeru		2D	2D				Banpresto		
	Zatch Bell! Mamodo Battles / Konjiki no Gash Bell! Yuujou no Tag Battle 2		3D	3D		Arena fighter	Anime	Eighting		
	Zatch Bell! Mamodo Fury / Konjiki no Gash Bell! Gekitou! Saikyou no Mamonotachi		3D	3D		Arena fighter	Anime	Mechanic Arms		
	Zeno Clash		3D	3D				ACE Team		
	Zero Divide		3D	3D				ZOOM Inc.		
	Zero Divide 2: The Secret Wish		3D	3D				ZOOM Inc.		
	Zero Divide: The Final Conflict		3D	3D				ZOOM Inc.		

== See also ==
- List of beat 'em ups
- List of crossovers in video games
- Lists of sports video games
  - List of boxing video games
  - List of professional wrestling video games
  - List of sumo video games
  - List of wrestling video games
- Wiktionary – Appendix:Fighting game terms
