= Kensei: Sacred Fist =

1998 video game

- North American cover art
- Developer: Konami Computer Entertainment Tokyo
- Publisher: Konami
- Director: Hirotaka Ishikawa
- Producer: Gozo Kitao
- Composers: Suzuki Kyoban; Norikazu Miura; Akira Yamaoka
- Platform: PlayStation
- Release: JP: November 19, 1998; NA: December 11, 1998; PAL: November 30, 1998
- Genre: Fighting
- Modes: Single-player, multiplayer

Kensei: Sacred Fist, known in Japan as Bugi (武戯 -BUGI-), is a 1998 fighting game developed by Konami Computer Entertainment Tokyo and published by Konami exclusively for the PlayStation. The game is Konami's fourth 3D fighting game following Lightning Legend, Fighting Bujutsu, and Battle Tryst.

== Gameplay ==
Gameplay screenshot

Kensei uses a button distribution style, separating them into punch, kick, throw and guard. The system provides the player with a large array of moves and combos, and multi-step throws are available, though both normal and multi-throws can be countered by pressing a button that flashes on the screen. Game speed is rather slow (one of the reasons for it not to become an arcade game), and relies more on timing, strategy and accurate knowledge of attack ranges to land successful combo strings and juggles. Button-mashing is often a bad tactical choice, since the characters remain vulnerable for long times after performing an unsuccessful combo. Jumping is realistic, albeit for some extra height. Sidestepping is allowed but is a much slower move, aside from some characters who integrate special sidesteps in their movesets.

The guard button acts rather as a "dodge" button, as the characters' animation shows them avoiding the attacks rather than taking them on their guard. Characters may assume rapidly a counter-offensive position or be "bounced back" to dodge, and the recovery time relies on the player's ability to press the guard button with sufficient time. Low attacks must be guarded by pressing Down + Guard Button, while pressing Up + Guard Button may allow the character to sidestep at the end of a combo.

The Arcade game structure of Kensei comprises 10 stages, with the first eight being made up of random opponents. The specific playing character will encounter a sub-boss in the ninth stage while the tenth one will have them facing off against the crime lord Leimeng and the eleventh (and final) one will have the playing character battle against Leimeng's bodyguard Kaiya. Along with the classical Survival, Training, and Time Attack modes, a special mini-game can be activated once all characters have been unlocked: it is a "racing" mode where the player controls a character and makes it run through a circuit, using button mashing to gain speed.

== Playable characters ==
The game features 9 initial playable fighters from around the world with their own varied fighting styles and 14 hidden characters that can be unlocked through the completion of the game. Most of the unlockables share a moveset with one of the main characters, with slight modifications regarding the attacking range and combo length.

The following is a list of the 9 main characters, with their unlockable counterparts:

- Yugo Sangunji (Karate, Japan): Yugo was forced into fighting his brother Akira as a result of their parents' disagreement over training methodologies. He finds himself leaving home and embarking on a journey in a bid to test his own strength, but Yugo is unaware that his father was murdered by his past rival, who is now a boss of underworld organization. His surname is spelled 三軍司 ("Sanguuji") in Japanese version. Voiced by Masaaki Ōkura.
- Akira Sangunji (Karate, Japan): The older brother and sub-boss to Yugo Sangunji.
- Hong Yuli (Drunken Fist, China): Yuli became curious about the true art of Drunken Fist Fighting while training under a Drunken Kung-Fu master called Su Qingtao. She is determined to prove herself as a first-class Drunken Kung-Fu artist, and avenge her parents' death at the hands of the crime boss. Voiced by Kumiko Watanabe.
- Su Qingtao (Drunken Fist, China): A master of Drunken Fist and sub-boss to Hong Yuli.
- Douglas Anderson (Jeet Kune Do/Koppo, USA): Douglas has spent years trying to hunt down a global crime syndicate. After a major breakthrough in the case, his partner Jim was gunned down in cold blood and is looking for a payback.
- Yoko Cindy Matsudaira (Koppo, USA): Sub-boss to Douglas Anderson and Leimeng's secretary. Voiced by Kimberly Forsythe.
- Allen (Muay Thai, raised in Asia): Parentless since infancy, and raised in an orphanage and by his abusive foster father, Allen's Muay Thai expertise was acquired to defend himself against a dangerous and pitiless world. He fights only for survival, one day at a time.
- Steve Laettner (Kickboxing, USA): The sub-boss to Allen.
- Ann Griffith (Amateur wrestling, Great Britain): Ann loves amateur wrestling and plans to expand public interest in it by staging a street fight event, ever since being saved by Arthur Stewart from a couple of street bikers. Voiced by Sarah Selleri.
- Arthur Stewart (Amateur wrestling, Great Britain): Sub-boss to Ann Griffith.
- Heinz Streit (Pit fighting, Germany): Heinz was born into a family of known aristocratic ancestry but quickly grew tired of his wealthy and pampered life, and currently spends his days picking and joining fights. He enjoys the status of being the black sheep of the family.
- Natsuki Kornelia (Pit fighting, Germany): The sub-boss to Heinz Streit.
- Hyoma Tsukikage (Ninjutsu, Japan): Left as an infant at Oomiwa Temple, along with his older sister Kazane, by their parents who subsequently disappeared, Hyoma has been training at the temple since that day, but one day, he comes across a clue to this parent's possible whereabouts and decides to search for them.
- Sessue Kanoh (Ninjutsu, Japan): The sub-boss to Hyoma, he is voiced by Koji Ishii.
- David Human (Professional wrestling, USA): A popular pro wrestler, David hears rumors that his friend and rival Mark has joined forces with a global underground organization, and decides to find out the truth.
- Mark Galeon (Professional wrestling, USA): The sub-boss to David Human. Voiced by Eric Kelso.
- Saya Tsubaki (Kenpo, Japan): Saya has a father who walked out five years ago, following her mother's death at the same time of her birth, and a family who avoids answering her questions about him. Tired of the evasions, with her father's sudden attack on her grandfather Genya as a last straw, she decides to search for him herself, despite her grandfather attempts to stop her and the attack was meant to lure her to him. Voiced by Yuriko Fuchizaki.
- Genya Tsubaki (Kenpo, Japan): The father of Kaiya Tsubaki and the grandfather to Saya. The sub-boss to Saya.

Other unlockable characters are:

- Zhou Leimeng ("Original Style", Hong Kong): The first boss of the game, Zhou is a Hong Kong Chinese man dressed in a business suit who controls an evil crime corporation. He is far shorter than the other characters in the game, therefore moves that target at his head's height usually fail against him.
- Kaiya Tsubaki (Kenpo, Japan): The second and final boss of the game. The father of Saya and son of Genya, the manual explains he is Zhou's bodyguard.
- Jelly Thomas/Billy Thomas ("Original Style", USA): Two American brothers who wear animal masks over their heads: Jelly (presumably "Jerry") wears a parrot mask while Billy wears a penguin mask. The two of them share the same character slot, much like Kuma/Panda in the Tekken series.
- Kazane Tsukikage (Ninjutsu, Japan): Kazane is the older sister of Hyoma. Her name was mistranslated as "Fuune" in the American manual, and entirely changed to "Kimiko" in the European manual. Voiced by Saeko Shimazu.

== Reception ==
Reception

Review scores
Publication	Score
GamePro	3.625/5
GameSpot	4.7/10
IGN	5.5/10
Official U.S. PlayStation Magazine	1.5/5

Kensei was largely not well received by critics. IGN and GameSpot were both quite critical to the game mechanics, with James Mielke calling the game a "bland" footnote in the history of the fighting game genre.
