= The Eye of Typhoon =

1996 fighting video game

- Cover of the 3DO version
- Developer(s): Viccom
- Publisher(s): Viccom (MS-DOS); LG (3DO)
- Platform(s): 3DO, MS-DOS, Neo Geo
- Release: 1996
- Genre(s): 2D Versus fighting
- Mode(s): Up to 2 players simultaneously

The Eye of Typhoon 極超豪拳, sometimes known in Korea as극초호권 (Kyoku Cho Gou Ken), is a 1996 2D fighting video game developed by Viccom. It is the second game Viccom created after Fight Fever, and was shown at the AOU Show in February 1996 as a Neo Geo title, but it was never released; however, during the same year, it was released for the 3DO and MS-DOS operating PCs exclusively in South Korea.

== Gameplay ==
3DO Interactive Multiplayer version screenshot showcasing a match between Sauri and Roy.

Like Fight Fever, The Eye of Typhoon plays similarly to other 2D versus fighting games. There are 12 playable fighters to choose from and two boss characters. The object of the game is to win two matches out of three. Each character has a set of moves in addition to two basic punches and kicks. Players also have the ability to taunt others, but unlike games such as SNK's Art of Fighting series, this has no effect and would actually leave the player open to attacks.

In single player mode, after selecting a character, the player must also select an opponent. The opponent order cycles randomly according to the character select screen. After the first twelve are defeated, the player must defeat two bosses, Powell and Mahesvara. Unlike Fight Fever, there is a 2-on-2 team mode, where players can choose two characters whether in certain order or randomly. The camera also zooms in and out depending on how far apart the characters are, like in the Art of Fighting series.

== Plot ==
The following plot summary comes from the title opening:

There was a mysterious fighting art called Kuk-Cho-Ho-Kwon which had been inherited since the Myoung Dynasty. However, it has disappeared and there is nothing left but a legend. Many years have passed and Asian nations such as China and Korea are in the state of chaos. Upon hearing about the mystery of Kuk-Cho-Ho-Kwon, the strong Western powers are desperately trying to recover it. Because of this, many innocent fighters have been destroyed and the secret book of Kuk-Cho-Ho-Kwon is beginning to reveal its real images...

Will Kuk-Cho-Ho-Kwon be resurrected? By whom...?

== Fighters ==
=== Playable ===
- Hoya, the main hero of the game, a fighter from Korea.
- Roy, a rugged American adventurer.
- Sauri, a Japanese kunoichi.
- Chohong, a female Chinese warrior who believes in Hoya.
- Wangchang, a Chinese glutton who is known for playing mahjong.
- Mui, a mysterious jungle warrior from Thailand.
- Harry Nelson, a noble English gentleman who fights using his whip.
- Tlaloc, an Aztec warrior from Mexico.
- Dalma Daesa, a small, elderly Korean man who carries a mystical wooden stick.
- Musasi Taro, a Japanese ninja.
- Natasha, an enormous Russian woman.
- Jarkill Marsciano, a masked Italian dancer that doubles as a fighter.

=== Bosses ===
- Major Powell, the sub-boss, a military fighter from England.
- Mahesvara, the final opponent of the game. a Demon from India, This boss has two separate forms, a female one for the first round and a male one for the second.

== Version differences ==
The 3DO version has a 3D-animated intro with logos and jingles of LG and Viccom, the characters are smaller compared to other fighting games at the time, the screen slightly zooms in when the announcer shouts "Fight!", and the select screen resembles the canceled Neo-Geo version's more than the DOS version's. The DOS version has fewer animations in each stage than the ones in the 3DO version, the characters sizes are normal like in other fighting games at the time, the select screen lacks moving objects other than cursors and timer, the loading screen is different, the AI of the characters are weaker than the ones in the 3DO version, and the background music played during fights restarts every round.

== See also ==
- List of fighting games
