= Mayumi Shintani =

Japanese actress and voice actress

- 新谷 真弓
- Born: November 6, 1975 (age 50); Hiroshima Prefecture, Japan
- Occupations: Actress; voice actress
- Years active: 1990–present
- Agent: Nylon100
- Height: 156 cm (5 ft 1 in)
- Website: shintanya.com

Mayumi Shintani (新谷 真弓, Shintani Mayumi; born November 6, 1975) is a Japanese actress and voice actress affiliated with Nylon100.

== Filmography ==
=== Anime ===
List of voice performances in anime
Year	Title	Role	Notes	Source
1998	His and Her Circumstances	Tsubasa Shibahime	Debut role	
1999	Dai-Guard	Domeki Rika		
2000	FLCL	Haruko Haruhara		
2000	Medarot Damashii	Honey		
2000	Brigadoon: Marin & Melan	Lolo		
2001	Earth Maiden Arjuna	Cindy Klein		
2002	Petite Princess Yucie	The scales		
2003	Guardian Hearts	Daisy	OVA series	
2013	Kill la Kill	Nonon Jakuzure		
2014	Black Butler: Book of Circus	Wendy		
2015	Durarara!! × 2 approval	Old woman		
2015	Go! Princess PreCure	Miss Shamour		
2016	Space Patrol Luluco	Midori		
2016	Natsume's Book of Friends	Hidaka		
2018	SSSS.Gridman	Orie Takarada		
2021	Battle Game in 5 Seconds	Mion		
2025	Bullet/Bullet	Brunch	ONA series	
2026	Jujutsu Kaisen	Takeru		
2026	Jaadugar: A Witch in Mongolia	Kirgistani		

=== Film ===
List of voice performances in feature films
Year	Title	Role	Notes	Source
2016	In This Corner of the World	San Hojo		
2019	Promare	Lucia Fex		
2023	Gridman Universe	Rikka's mother		
2026	The Ribbon Hero	Zirco		

=== Video games ===
List of voice performances in video games
Year	Title	Role	Notes	Source
2001	Jade Cocoon 2	Nico	PS1/PS2	
2002	The King of Fighters 2002	Ángel	Also Unlimited Match	
2006	Blood+: One Night Kiss	Fukuoka Tsubasa	PS1/PS2	
2015	Bravely Second: End Layer	Aimee Matchlock	3DS	
2019	Kill la Kill: IF	Nonon Jakuzure		
2021	Cookie Run: Kingdom	Alchemist Cookie		
2021	Guilty Gear: Strive	Giovanna	PS4/PS5/PC	
2025	Genshin Impact	Barbeloth	Android/iOS/PS4/PS5/Xbox Series X&S/PC	

=== Dubbing ===
==== Live-action ====
- Chappie, Yolandi (Yolandi Visser)
- Cinderella, Drisella (Sophie McShera)
- Dark Places, Patty Day (Christina Hendricks)
- Fantastic Beasts: The Secrets of Dumbledore, Bunty Broadacre (Victoria Yeates)
- Meet the Blacks, Allie (Bresha Webb)
- Mother's Day, Dana Barton (Jennifer Garner)
- Tom & Jerry, Dorothy (Patsy Ferran)
- A Walk in the Woods, Mary Ellen (Kristen Schaal)
- Wonka, Gwennie (Ellie White)

==== Animation ====
- Onward, Grecklin
- Robinson Crusoe, May
- Avatar: The Last Airbender, Azula

=== Live action ===
List of acting performances
Year	Title	Role	Notes	Source
2004	Cutie Honey	Scarlet Claw		
2006	Sinking of Japan			
2022	Anime Supremacy!			
