= Ángel (The King of Fighters) =

Video game character

- The King of Fighters character
- Ángel as drawn by Eisuke Ogura for The King of Fighters XIV
- First game: The King of Fighters 2001
- Created by: Angel Torres
- Designed by: Styleos
- Voiced by: Mina Tominaga (KOF 2001), Mayumi Shintani (KOF 2002), Miki Ogura (KOF XIV onwards)

In-universe information
- Fighting style: Muay Thai; Professional wrestling
- Origin: Veracruz, Mexico
- Nationality: Mexican

Ángel (Japanese: アンヘル, Hepburn: Anheru) is a character from The King of Fighters (KOF) series by SNK. She is portrayed as a ditzy yet deadly Mexican female fighter who is introduced as an agent from the organization NESTS hosting the title tournament from the video game The King of Fighters 2001. She also appears in the following games: The King of Fighters 2002, The King of Fighters XIV, and The King of Fighters XV with other team members as she starts a new life free from NESTS. She also appears in the PlayStation 2 version of The King of Fighters Neowave.

Concepts for Ángel's creation originated during the development of The King of Fighters 2001, for which the SNK development team interacted with developers from Evoga who wanted the game to feature a new Mexican representative. Though SNK never confirmed this origin, it remained a mystery among several journalists for video games who analyzed how Ángel's character seems to appeal primarily to Latin American fans of the series, especially since Mexico is one of the countries with the highest amount of fans. She is voiced by Mina Tominaga in her introduction, Mayumi Shintani in KOF 2002 and Miki Ogura in KOF XIV onwards.

Critics provided multiple opinions about the handling of her design and movesets in regards to how Ángel differs from common wrestler archetypes in gaming while still carrying realistic moves.

== Conception and design ==
Despite the episode being created by Eolith, the Mexican company Evoga had a major influence in the game due to the franchise's popularity within Latin America. This pushed the development team to design a setting with Mexican undertones and also to add an entire character, Ángel, a NESTS agent from Mexico. The team played The King of Fighters '98 alongside the developers to see if they could include a character within the game. A member from Evoga won, resulting in the team requesting to add Ángel in the game. The design was made by Toshiyuki Kotani, also known as "styleos".

Standing 168 centimetres (5 ft 6 in) tall and with measurements of 92-60-89 cm (36-24-35 in), the SNK staff made Ángel's design with "overwhelming passion". She was specifically created to be both a strong and appealing fighter, she also was able to use the special move Unchained Circle, which is "one tough customer to deal with". When deciding the voice actress for the character, the famous Mina Tominaga was chosen which pleased the designer in charge. The artist in charge of The King of Fighters 2001, Nona, said that he had to revise Angel's design to make her eyes smaller and thus, properly balancing them with the rest of the cast. For The King of Fighters 2002 and its remake, Unlimited Match, Tominaga was replaced with Mayumi Shintani.

For The King of Fighters XIV, Ángel retained her original NESTS outfit but the SNK staff found her Unchained fighting style more challenging to do. When creating the AI data for CPU battles, it took about three times as long to create the AI for Unchained compared to other characters. Ángel's movements when the difficulty setting is set to "5" level are tricky, so if the players know how to move Ángel, they are recommended to refer to the movements in CPU battles. An alternate design was given for The King of Fighters XIV. The character's gameplay was altered for The King of Fighters XV to have her Unchained Circle more useful in general. Tominaga was replaced by Miki Ogura in the following games. Although Ángel does not appear in SNK Heroines: Tag Team Frenzy, artist Eisuke Ogura said that having Kula Diamond wear Ángel's outfit brought up the fact that Kula hates Ángel, so the game's villain, Kukri, gave her that appearance to humiliate her.

== Appearances ==
Introduced in The King of Fighters 2001, Ángel is an agent from the terrorist organization NESTS, representing the group with K9999, Kula Diamond and Diana in "The King of Fighters" tournament. When their superior Zero dies in the aftermath, Ángel and K9999 turn against Kula and Roxy in a rebellion. Depending on team chosen, the fight is interrupted by the rebellious NESTS experiment K' or left ambiguous. Should NESTS team instead be the ones rebelling against their creator, Ángel and K9999 leave the group after their superior's deaths, while Kula and Diana join forces with K'. Ángel returns in The King of Fighters 2002 though the game does not have a narrative. Nevertheless, the character can be fought as a boss.

Ángel makes her return as part of Team Mexico with Ramon and King of Dinosaurs in The King of Fighters XIV which is further explored in the manga The King of Fighters: A New Beginning. Ángel's career as a wrestler makes her one of Mexico's most popular fighters but still shows signs of enhancements caused by NESTS' founder Igniz who is trying to revive the organization. During's Antonov fighting tournament, Ángel fights the mercenary Leona Heidern from the Ikari Warriors Team and loses. However, she later aids Kyo Kusanagi's group into facing the undead army born from the supernatural creature Verse who interrupts the competition. In the latest game from the franchise, The King of Fighters XV, Ángel and K9999, now renamed Krohnen McDougall, kidnap Kula Diamond in an attempt to obtain money from her caretakers. They recruit them in their team for the new competition and eventually obtain the money. In their endings, Ángel and Krohnen release Kula instead and decide to travel across the world together.

Outside the main KOF series, Ángel also appears as an exclusive PlayStation 2 character from the spin-off game The King of Fighters Neowave. She is also present in the mobile game The King of Fighters All Star.

== Critical reception ==
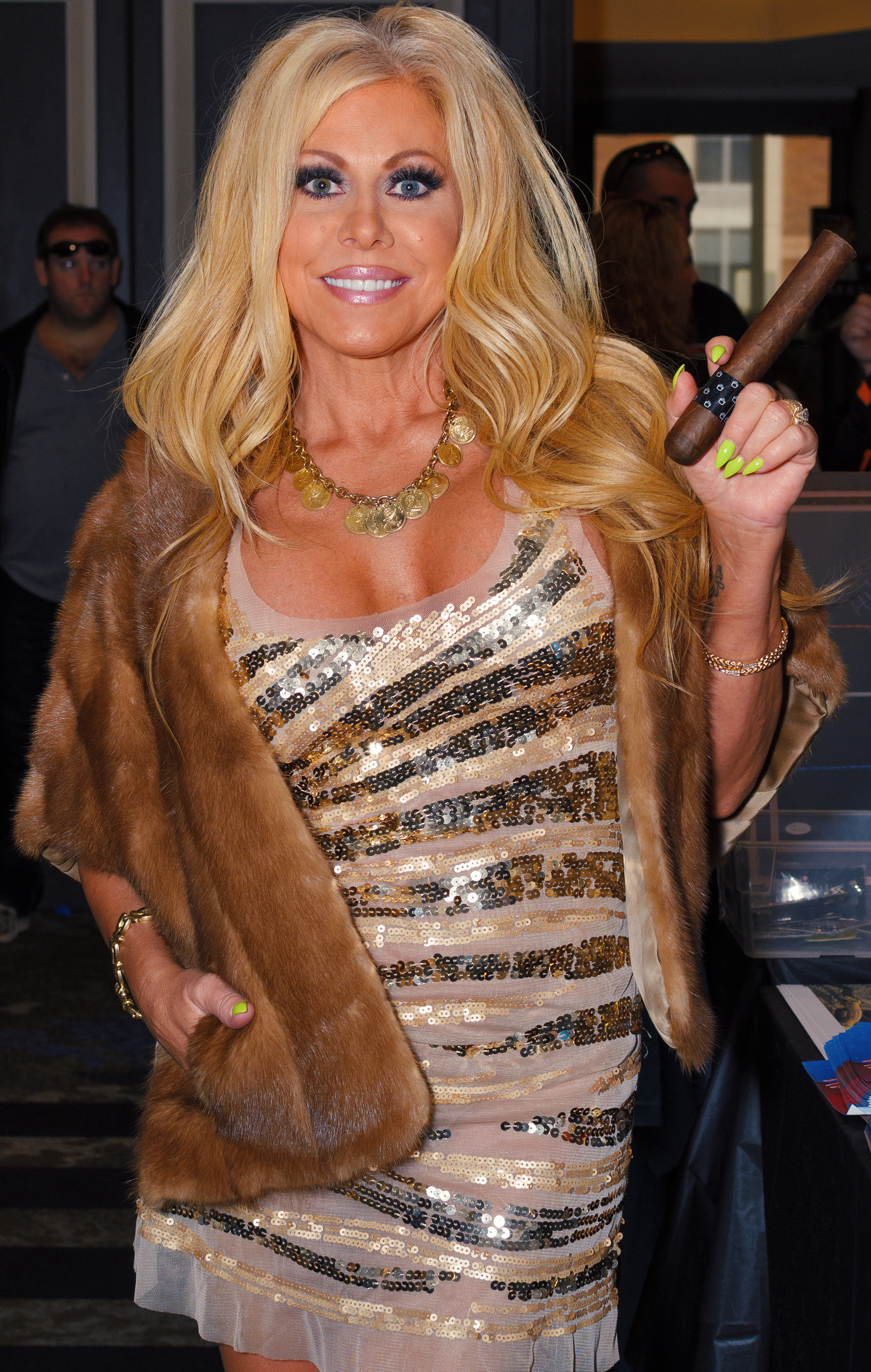
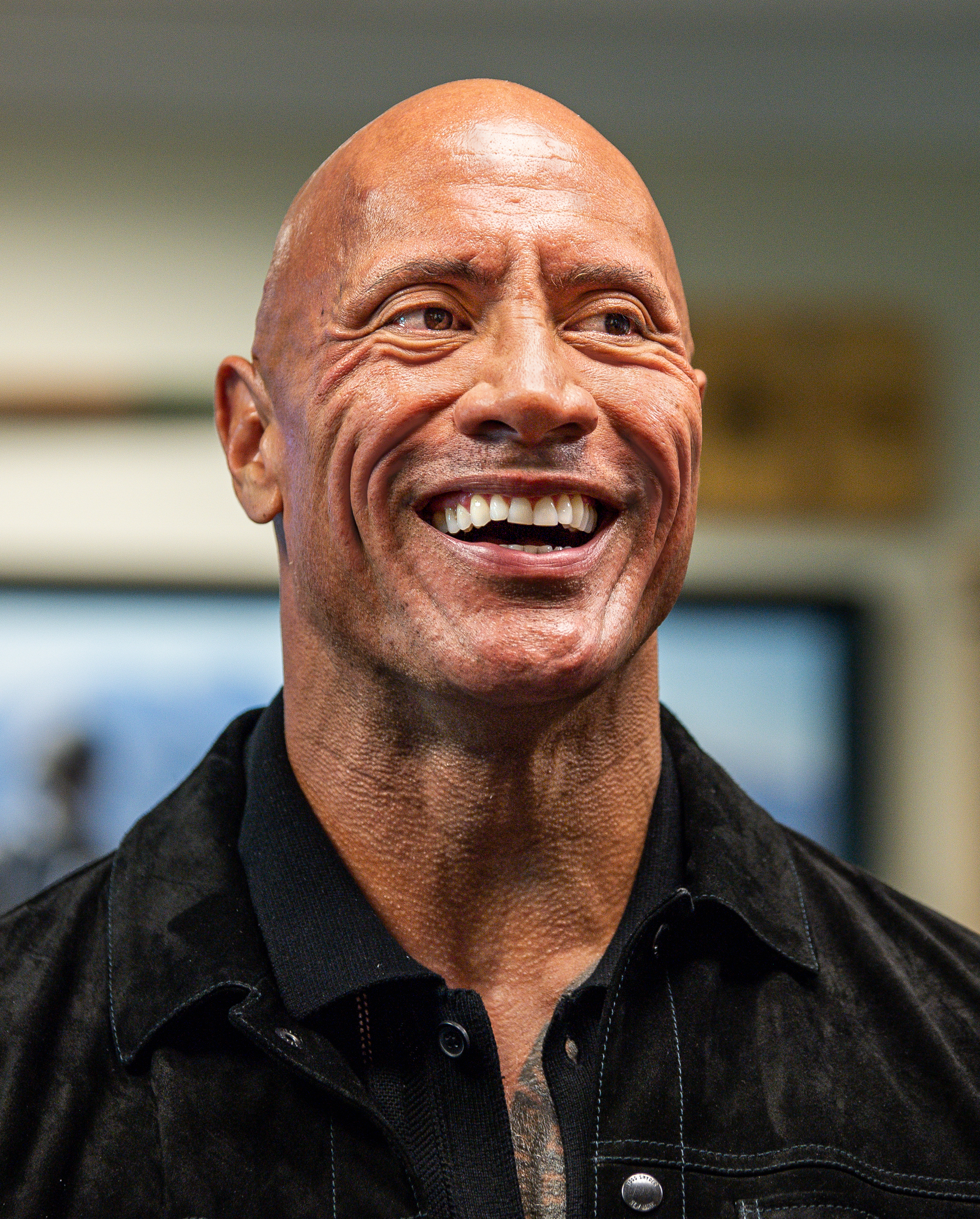
Besides being popular for representing Mexico, Ángel's design and moves have been compared to real wrestlers, most notably Terri Runnels (left) and Dwayne Johnson (right).

In "Ocio valioso y The King of Fighters en México". Mario López Ledezma commented that Ángel's creation seems inspired by the popularity of The King of Fighters in Mexico. It is a myth that Ángel was introduced thanks to a Mexican developer called Angel Torres, who interacted with the SNK developers in charge of Rage of the Dragons in Osaka, Japan. Although there are no legitimate proofs behind this, the writer added that it helps to prove how significant the relationship between Mexico and The King of Fighters became and how it influenced game designers.

In a retrospective of the franchise, Kotaku noted that in the 2000s SNK started adding Mexican fighters in their games with the three most notable being Ramon, Angel and Tizoc. Similar to Ledezma's analysis, Kotaku finds the addition of Angel highly notable based on rumors about SNK creating it after losing a match with another game developer. Whether this is true or not, Kotaku claimed that while SNK was informed about it, they never confirmed it.

According to Jean-Karlo Lemus from Anime News Network, Angel stands out as a fan favorite that was notable when her trailer for The King of Fighters XV was uploaded. It inspired multiple fanarts on Twitter and the popularity traces back to her origins as a Mexican fighter with iconic techniques based on Dwayne Johnson. Lemus said that Angel is SNK's answer to the franchise's high popularity in Mexico, bringing back the urban legend of EVOGA's president who was responsible for creating her when interacting with the game developers.

According to Screen Rant, Ángel's design and moveset appear to be inspired by Terri Runnels besides Dwayne Johnson. However, they noticed her return was surprising as SNK stopped including her after The King of Fighters 2002 and The King of Fighters XIV was her major return. Screen Rant further called her Unchain Circle's gameplay mechanics to be hard to perform due to the multiple combinations they tend to be given. Multiple fighters share the mechanics under the nickname of "Rekka" and is hard to master. TheGamer noted that while Ángel is fun to play as, her gameplay can be demanding too which might lead to a rewarding feeling if properly used. In February 2024, Kotobukiya produced a bishojo figurine of Ángel.

Atomix said the Mexican representative character Ángel left a major impression in The King of Fighters not only for her design but also for her special moves based on pro wrestling. Commenting also on the Mexican representants in gaming, Jose Del Carmen Medina Rios noted Ángel broke the stereotypes of wrestlers who always wore masks to conceal their identity while her body like King from Tekken or Tizoc from Fatal Fury is not as physically developed as other fighters with her gender also outstanding.

In his examination of Digital Narratives and Linguistic Articulations of Mexican Identities in Emergent Media: Race, Lucha Libre Masks and Mock Spanish, Professor Daniel Calleros Villarreal discussed the manner in which Ángel is portrayed when compared to other wrestlers from fighting games. Ángel stands out thanks to sex appeal which seems obvious due to her skimpy clothing made by SNK designers. The character's file, however, manages to expand more on the fighter's personality giving her a broad sense of interest in life similar to fellow fighter Ramon. The KOF characters are noted to appeal to Latin American audiences based on notes from the developers.
