= Poy Poy 2 =

1998 video game

- European cover art
- Developer: Konami
- Publisher: Konami
- Director: Masashi Ugajin
- Producer: Masaki Yoneoka
- Programmers: Takanori Murayama; Masayoshi Sato
- Artist: Masashi Ugajin
- Composer: Akira Yamaoka
- Platform: PlayStation
- Release: July 9, 1998
- Genre: Fighting
- Modes: Single-player, multiplayer

Poy Poy 2 is a 1998 fighting game developed and published by Konami for the PlayStation. The game is the sequel to Poy Poy (1997).

== Gameplay ==
The gameplay is the same as in Poy Poy, though it features more powers and moves, as well as different characters and arenas. The characters use gloves, each with unique powers to aid gameplay. There are three game modes:

"PoyPoy Cup" is a single player campaign, where the player chooses a character and progresses through tournament stages, earning gold. They can use their winnings to purchase or upgrade gloves, as well as purchase 'drinks' which give the player a temporary upgrade for an event. Upon completing the championship multiple times, the player is given the opportunity to face the boss characters. Upgrading gloves requires the player to use that glove's particular ability a set number of times. Occasionally a dark figure will appear, offering to sell a special glove to the player.

"Party Play" is used for both Single and Multiplayer, where the up to four players (Using AI players to replace any missing slots) can set up a quick battle on whatever stage they choose.

"Team Battle" can only be played with one or two players. The player(s) are made into a two-person team (Using a replacement AI character if only one person is playing) and compete with other AI teams to score as many points as possible. They play seven matches, and when they are finished, a cash bonus is added to the "PoyPoy Cup" gold count.

The players are given points for direct hits (1 point each), collecting 'lucky' gold hearts (2 points each), and their finishing position based either on when they died, or their current health. First place gets 12 points, Second place gets 6, Third place gets 4 and Fourth place gets 2.
