= Robo Pit =

1996 video game

- North American PlayStation cover art
- Developer: Altron
- Publisher: Kokopeli Digital Studios: JP: Altron
- Programmer: Kozo Nishio
- Composer: Minako Adachi
- Platforms: PlayStation, Sega Saturn
- Release: PlayStation: JP: January 13, 1996; NA: July 10, 1996; PAL: October 10, 1996; Sega Saturn: JP: February 16, 1996; NA: September 24, 1996; PAL: November 1996
- Genre: Fighting
- Modes: Single-player, multiplayer

Robo Pit (ロボピット) is a 1996 fighting game for PlayStation and Sega Saturn by Japanese video game company Altron. It is a 3D arena fighter involving robots whereby players build a robot and compete against other robots to the top. It was originally released on January 13, 1996, and was published internationally by Kokopeli Digital Studios.

== Gameplay ==
Gameplay screenshot

The object of Robo Pit is to build a robot and then fight to the top in arenas that are square in shape. There are many different types of arenas, some with bosses, and the time of day can vary.

There are various types of weapons which include axe, lips, sword, missile and claws. The robots different body parts have different stats that affect its performance. Although all body parts are available from the start, the only way to unlock more weapons is to fight more robot enemies.

== Reception ==
Reception

Review scores
Publication	Score
AllGame	1.5/5 (SS)
Electronic Gaming Monthly	6.375/10 (SS)
GameFan	83/100 (PS)
IGN	6.5/10 (PS)
Next Generation	3/5 (PS, SS)
PlayStation Official Magazine – UK	4/10 (PS)

Robo Pit received mixed reviews. Critics generally reviled the one-player mode as mind-numbingly long and easy, but were much more pleased with the two-player mode, though some criticized the lack of support for the PlayStation Link Cable. They particularly praised the ability to create one's own robot and save it to memory card, the winner's claiming of one of their opponent's arms as a prize, and the generally fun quality of the gameplay. Most found the graphics generally lacking in detail, but liked the cute and varied robot designs. The controls were also praised as being accurate and easy to learn.

Reviews for the Saturn port made similar comments, though this time they tended to criticize rather than complement the cuteness of the robots. A review in Next Generation said the Saturn and PlayStation versions are "nearly identical".

== Sequel ==
A sequel, Robo Pit 2, was released in Japan on PlayStation in 1997, and later in Europe and North America in 2003.
