= Battle Tryst =

1998 arcade video game

- Japanese arcade flyer of Battle Tryst.
- Developer: Konami
- Publisher: Konami
- Director: Shujiro Hamakawa
- Producer: Fumiaki Tanaka
- Designers: Shujiro Hamakawa (character designer); Mamoru Oshii (animator)
- Programmers: Yasuyuki Nakane; Masanori Taniguchi; Tadashi Kitagawa
- Composer: Hiroshi Tanabe
- Platform: Arcade
- Release: February 1998
- Genre: Fighting
- Mode: Up to 2 players simultaneously
- Arcade system: Konami M2 Hardware

Battle Tryst (バトルトライスト) is a 1998 3D fighting arcade game developed and published by Konami. It is Konami's second attempt in the 3D arcade fighting game market after their 1997 3D arcade fighting game Fighting Bujutsu. It is powered by the Konami M2 Hardware, which is Konami's version of the Panasonic M2. Like Fighting Bujutsu, Battle Tryst was never ported to any home console after its arcade release.

Battle Tryst uses a three-button 8-way joystick layout that is similar to the one in Sega's Virtua Fighter series, as well as the time release being adopted from Namco's Tekken series.

The opening and character endings use real Japanese animation. Film director Mamoru Oshii took charge of the storyboard of the animations, while Shujiro Hamakawa designed the characters. Simon and Richter Belmont from the Castlevania series were planned to appear in Battle Tryst, as well as Madoka from the TwinBee series, but all three were canceled.

The game was exhibited at the February 1998 AOU Show.

== Fighters ==
Kika Gryphon (キカ・グリフォン)
Takeru Yamato (ヤマト・タケル)
Bites Macintosh (バイツ・マッキントシュ)
Zankoku (ザンコク)
Zhai Zhai (ツァイ・ツァイ)
Gary Williams (ゲーリー・ウィリアムス)
Nadjeed Shiee (ナジード・シー)

Hidden fighters

Kitajima (キタジマ)
Alex (アレックス)
Elein Shiee (エレイン・シー) (Elaine Shea) - the "Fairy" character from Konami's Gaiapolis arcade game.
Pastel (パステル) - pilot of WinBee from Konami's TwinBee series.
