= Poy Poy =

1997 video game

- North American box art
- Developer: Konami
- Publisher: Konami
- Director: Kenji Miura
- Producer: Yutaka Haruki
- Programmer: Kenji Miura
- Artist: Masashi Ugajin
- Writer: Masashi Ugajin
- Composer: Takayuki Fujii
- Platform: PlayStation
- Release: JP: June 12, 1997; NA: October 6, 1997; EU: April 1998
- Genre: Party
- Modes: Single-player, multiplayer

Poy Poy (Note: Japanese: ポイッターズ・ポイント, Hepburn: Poittāzu Pointo; lit. "Poitters' Point") is a 1997 party video game developed and published by Konami for the PlayStation. It was also released on the Japanese PlayStation Network in 2007. A sequel, Poy Poy 2, was released in 1998.

== Gameplay ==
Poy Poy is a multiplayer action game in which four players battle each other using various props, such as rocks, logs, and blocks of ice in one of six environments. Combat consists of picking up the various props, and throwing them at opponents. One can also pick up and throw the opponent's character directly. Each character has different strengths and weaknesses in terms of strength (ability to pick up heavier props and do so more quickly) and speed (agility moving about the play field). Players can also use special gloves that use "psychopower" to unleash different abilities. Each character has a glove with which they have a 100% synchronisation rate (they have the most aptitude for). In several environments, there are hazards that must be avoided by players, but some players with the proper abilities can use these environmental hazards against their opponents. Up to four players can participate at a time (provided the players have a multitap peripheral which is compatible with the PlayStation). Computer-controlled players fill any spaces not occupied by human players.

In exhibition mode, players engage in three rounds of combat. Poy Poy Cup is the single-player mode in which three computer-controlled competitors try to defeat the player in each environment. Each victory gives the player prize money to be spent on upgraded equipment.

== Reception ==
Reception

Aggregate score
Aggregator	Score
GameRankings	74%

Review scores
Publication	Score
AllGame	3/5
Edge	7/10
Electronic Gaming Monthly	8.25/10
Famitsu	24/40
Game Informer	7/10
GameFan	258/300
GamePro	4.5/5
GameSpot	5.3/10
IGN	8/10
Next Generation	4/5
PlayStation Official Magazine – UK	7/10
Official U.S. PlayStation Magazine	3/5

Poy Poy received above-average reviews according to the review aggregation website GameRankings. In Japan, however, Famitsu gave it a score of 24 out of 40.

Next Generation's early review called it "the best multiplayer game for the PlayStation, hands down", elaborating that, "There isn't too much strategy, per se, but with a long, impressive list of special powers each competitor can choose from before the match, and a few special items to grab for during a match (or avoid, since there are some dangerous doodads mixed in with the good ones), the amount of entropy generated is enough to please even the most die-hard of chaos theorists." Art Angel of GamePro's early review called it "a Bomberman-esque arcade/strategy game that rocks the house with great graphics, fun multiplayer action, and an unusual array of characters." Other reviewers, including GameFan and Game Informer, gave the Japanese version early reviews as well, months before the game was released Stateside.

Electronic Gaming Monthly's Shawn Smith described it in an early review as "A swingin' multiplayer title that's easy to control, looks good and has long-lasting, one-player features to boot." He and the other three members of the EGM review team concurred that the game has enough variations and secrets to make it highly replayable even in one-player mode, though they still felt the multiplayer was the game's chief draw. IGN's early review said that the game was "so addictive that once you start playing, you won't put your controller down." Joe Fielder, who reviewed Poy Poy for GameSpot several months after it had been covered by other gaming publications, was a dissenting voice against the game. While he remarked that Poy Poy has much more strategy and depth than similar games, he felt that it simply lacked the addictive quality needed to make it a success.

== Sequel ==
The game was followed by Poy Poy 2, also released on PlayStation which featured similar gameplay to that of Poy Poy.
