= The King of Fighters 2001 =

2001 video game

- Arcade flyer featuring K'
- Developers: Eolith; BrezzaSoft; Playmore (DC, PS2)
- Publishers: SNK: Sun Amusement (MVS & AES) Playmore (DC) PlayStation 2; JP: SNK Playmore; KOR: MEGA
- Director: Lee Sen Ho
- Producer: Chil Suk Choi
- Designer: H. Iga
- Programmer: S. Fujinuki
- Artists: Hiroaki Hashimoto; Nona
- Writer: Teampow
- Composers: Kikuko Hataya; Masahiko Hataya
- Series: The King of Fighters
- Platform: Arcade: Dreamcast, Microsoft Windows, Neo Geo AES, PlayStation 2
- Release: November 15, 2001: Arcade; WW: November 15, 2001 Neo Geo AES; WW: March 14, 2002 Dreamcast; JP: December 26, 2002 PlayStation 2; JP: October 23, 2003; KOR: January 15, 2004 Windows; KOR: October 27, 2003 PlayStation Network; TW: July 15, 2015
- Genre: Fighting
- Modes: Single-player, multiplayer
- Arcade system: Neo Geo MVS

The King of Fighters 2001 (Note: Japanese: ザ・キング・オブ・ファイターズ 2001, Hepburn: Za Kingu Obu Faitāzu 2001), also shortened as KOF 2001, is a 2001 fighting game developed by Eolith and BrezzaSoft and published by SNK for the Neo Geo arcade and home platforms. The eighth installment in The King of Fighters series, it was the first to be released following the closure of the original SNK and the last with its involvement. The King of Fighters 2001 uses the NESTS arc system of teams but introduces the freedom to designate the three of the four members as either fighters or assistants in order to create different types of combos.

Plot-wise, the game is the third and final part of the "NESTS Chronicles" story arc, as the NESTS organization hosts its own King of Fighters tournament with its agents aiming to bring a revolution to the world. The influence from the influx of Korean capital can be seen in the character roster. In 2002, the game was ported to the Dreamcast in Japan only and later to the PlayStation 2; a stand-alone PlayStation 2 version was published in North America and in Europe in a two-in-one bundle with the preceding game in the series, The King of Fighters 2000. Later ports of the game were released on the Nintendo Switch, PlayStation 4, and Xbox One consoles. Two novelizations were written by Akihiko Ureshino.

Critical response to the video game was mixed, with praise focused on the handling of the Striker system and the diverse yet balanced roster. However, the audiovisual presentation was the subject of more negative reception than its predecessors. Eolith also produced the subsequent game, The King of Fighters 2002, without a new story as a result of the NESTS arc ending and removed the Striker System due to negative feedback.

== Gameplay ==
An example of a fight.

The King of Fighters 2001 is a 2D fighting game that relies on teams composed of four characters used to defeat the other teams by using combat combos and special moves. Like in the previous game, the battles are between teams of four. Introduced in this game is a "Wire Damage" feature, which has two forms: Critical Wire for offense and Counter Wire for defense. The Wire Damage attack knocks the opponent to the other side of the screen, bouncing them back towards the user, which makes them vulnerable to further attacks and combos. Super Attack moves can generate major fast effects when Wire Damage is executed.

Instead of a strict "three fighters and one striker" format, this installment introduces the Tactical Order System, which allows the player to designate characters as combatants or strikers. Before each match, the player forms a team composed of any combination of one to four fighters and zero to three strikers. The number of strikers on a team affects the length and number of stocks of the player's Power Gauge. Teams with no strikers will have a longer Power Gauge to fill and can carry only one stock, while a team with only one fighter and three strikers will fill their Power Gauge quicker and carry up to four stocks. One stock is needed to summon a striker, perform a guard or super cancel, a blow-away attack, or a Super Special Move. MAX-level Super Special Moves requires two stocks to perform. Players can now cancel an attack into a Striker Summon with the use of a Cancel Striker, while some characters now have Wire Whip techniques, which will send an opponent flying into the air and arrive at the other side of the fighting area.

== Plot and characters ==
At the end of The King of Fighters 2000, South Town was decimated by the now-destroyed Zero Cannon created by the NESTS cartel. A year later, another The King of Fighters tournament is being held, this time hosted by the cartel. Following the tournament, NESTS commands agent Zero to destroy the tournament winners. He traps the winning team in a spaceship that was disguised as a blimp and faces them alongside his followers: Ron, Krizalid and Glaugan. When he is defeated, Zero urges the team to escape the collapsing ship and dies. The NESTS team with Ángel and K9999 attacking Kula Diamond and Foxy, but depending on the characters used, the rebellious K' interrupts them. The son of the NESTS' CEO, Igniz, seeks to become the new leader of NESTS, seizing the opportunity to do so near the end of the 2001 tournament. Upon successfully murdering his father and becoming the new leader, Igniz decides to test his newly acquired power against the finalists in the hopes of crushing them and becoming a new god. His ambition is short-lived, however, as he is defeated and dies in a self-destruction attack. Following Igniz's death, the remaining agents make peace with each other and start new lives without the cartel.

The King of Fighters 2001 includes 10 teams of four fighters, a sub-boss, and a final boss, totaling 42 combatants. New characters to the franchise are NESTS Team members K9999 and Ángel as well as May Lee Jinju from the Korea Justice Team and the two boss characters Zero and Igniz.

Hero Team

- K'
- Maxima
- Whip
- Lin

Japan Team

- Kyo Kusanagi
- Benimaru Nikaido
- Goro Daimon
- Shingo Yabuki

Iori Team

- Iori Yagami
- Vanessa
- Seth
- Ramón

Ikari Warriors Team

- Leona Heidern
- Ralf Jones
- Clark Still
- Heidern

Fatal Fury Team

- Terry Bogard
- Andy Bogard
- Joe Higashi
- Blue Mary

Art of Fighting Team

- Ryo Sakazaki
- Robert Garcia
- Yuri Sakazaki
- Takuma Sakazaki

Women Fighters Team

- King
- Mai Shiranui
- Hinako Shijo
- Li Xiangfei

NESTS Team

- Kula Diamond
- Foxy
- K9999
- Ángel

Psycho Soldier Team

- Athena Asamiya
- Sie Kensou
- Chin Gentsai
- Bao

Korea Justice Team

- Kim Kaphwan
- Chang Koehan
- Choi Bounge
- May Lee Jinju

Sub-Boss

- Zero

Final Boss

- Igniz

== Development ==
Immediately following the bankruptcy of SNK, development of a new The King of Fighters was first revealed in October 2001. South Korean studio Eolith took over development of the franchise, which it obtained from the bankruptcy proceedings. Eolith explained there would some changes but the game would be released first on the Neo Geo MVS arcade system, with Sun Amusement being assigned to distribute it instead. Eolith was also a financial sponsor along with Mega Enterprise while Playmore also published it. Due to the franchise's popularity in Korea, Eolith took interest in developing The King of Fighters and wanted to please the fans of the series worldwide. BrezzaSoft helped Eolith in the making of the game. Fearing disappointment from returning fans, Eolith decided to maintain most of the common parts from The King of Fighters while adding new elements. One of the biggest changes is the optional use of the Striker mechanic, where players can use between one and three characters assisting the playable one. The team aimed to refine the original gameplay system from previous KOF games. During development, Eolith conducted a team popularity poll of the characters on its Korean website; however, the results had no bearing on the cast selection. Because both Kyo Kusanagi and Iori Yagami are popular characters in Japan and Korea, the developers made sure to include them. But the developers omitted Kim Kaphwan, a character of Korean ancestry, despite speculation on his inclusion. The game was originally envisioned as a "Dream Match" game like The King of Fighters '98 but ultimately became the third canonical entry in the NESTS Chronicles story line.

Mexican company Evoga had a major influence on the game due to the franchise's popularity within Latin America. As a result, the development team designed a setting with Mexican undertones and also created the new character Ángel. Due to the transfer of Shinkiro, who had been in charge of character illustrations, Nona was appointed as his successor. References to works from Evoga can be seen in the scenarios from the game. While working on it, the team played The King of Fighters '98 alongside the developers to see if they could include a character within the game. A member from Evoga won, resulting in the team requesting to add Ángel to the game. Designer Yamazaki previously wanted Rock Howard to appear in Capcom vs. SNK, but the Garou: Mark of the Wolves team refused, saying he should develop first in the Fatal Fury games. So among SNK, they said they were not having him again and instead depicted him as a child who follows Terry. However, Yamazaki found it more frustrating that a playable Rock ended up appearing in Capcom vs. SNK 2.

In designing new characters, Eolith wanted an Athena Asamiya-like Korean fighter, leading to the creation of May Lee. In preparing the boss characters, the original team was dissatisfied with Zero's portrayal in The King of Fighters 2000, which led to the inclusion of the real Zero, retconning the former boss as a clone. Glaugan was originally intended for the prequel but was instead used as an assist character. SNK faced struggles with making Zero, as they wanted to create a boss that surpassed Krizalid from The King of Fighters '99. The final boss, Igniz, was conceptualized as a sexually appealing character in order to generate a contrast with other members of the cast. Nevertheless, the development team stated they felt Igniz fit well in the game.

== Release and related media ==
The arcade version was released in November 15, 2001. The Neo Geo ROM cartridge was published on March 14, 2002, which was followed by ports to the Dreamcast on December 26, 2002, and the PlayStation 2 on October 23, 2003. A Dreamcast collection was released on January 22, 2004. Tonko produced several new illustrations for the console ports. In North America, the game was not available until 2003. The PlayStation 2 version was released alongside The King of Fighters 2000 as one of the first games published by SNK Playmore USA. Both the original Neo Geo version and the Dreamcast version were included in The King of Fighters NESTS Hen compilation released for the PlayStation 2 in Japan. Hamster Corporation re-released the game as part of their ACA Neo Geo series for the PlayStation 4, Xbox One, Nintendo Switch, Windows, Android and iOS.

Akihiko Ureshino also wrote two light novels based on the game: The God Themselves and More Than Humans. Hiroaki Hashimoto handled the artwork, and Kadokawa Shoten published both volumes on February 20, 2002. Ureshino said K' and Maxima's relationship was explored across the NESTS arc, starting off distant and becoming friends in 2001, eventually starting a family-like group with Whip and Kula in the ending. K9999 was more of a pushover than a rival to K' in contrast to the writing of the previous leads, Kyo and Iori, who stand as equals while acknowledging each other as close allies. The novelizations of KOF 2001 were written with this in mind.

== Reception ==
Reception

Review scores
Publication	Score
GameSpot	8.7/10
Insert Credit	8.9/10
Obsolete Tears	5/6
Retro Replay	7.4/10

Award
Publication	Award
Monthly Arcadia	Best Annual Income Award

=== Sales ===
In Japan, Game Machine listed The King of Fighters 2001 in their December 15, 2001, issue as the second most successful arcade game of the month. Famitsu reported that the AES version sold over 6,126 copies in its first week on the market. The PS2 port of the game sold 39,022 units in Japan.

=== Critical response ===
The gameplay appealed to game critics, with IGN's Jeremy Dunham saying The King of Fighters 2001 was a major improvement on the last iteration thanks to the new versatility with Strikers and how they would handle the playable character's energy bars to perform more Desperation Moves. Kurt Kulata of Hardcore Gaming 101 felt the console ports tried fixing the arcade version's issues and compared the new handling of Strikers to Capcom vs SNK due to the freedom the player has to make characters stronger. Additionally, he noted that the two bosses were surprisingly difficult. Despite acknowledging the issues with SNK not properly developing the game, MeriStation staff enjoyed the variety of the cast. They commended the return of classic characters like Kyo Kusanagi and Iori Yagami as team members following two games alone, among other Fatal Fury and Art of Fighting guests, while also praising the final boss, Igniz, for being nearly as difficult to defeat as Goenitz from The King of Fighters '96. Atomix's reviewer praised the gameplay balances the developers brought to the cast by revising the Striker System, finding it comparable to Marvel vs Capcom 2 while also improving the Armor Mode. Writing for GameSpot, Andrew Seyoon Park echoed similar comments about the balance with the cast and the Striker system in the NeoGeo port. However, he criticized the high difficulty of the boss Igniz. Chris Moyse of Destructoid criticized The King of Fighters 2001's gameplay changes that came about from SNK's bankruptcy. He praised the new cast, such as May Lee and Foxy, but panned the storyline of the NESTS arc for bringing several clone characters into the story.

The game's presentation was the subject of negative response. Kulata criticized the character illustrations and the poor background themes. Dunham praised the visuals for giving stages 3D backgrounds but criticized the handling of character sprites. Atomix staff felt the artwork was worse than previous installments as a result of longtime artist Shinkiro departure from SNK and subsequent replacement by Nona and Styleos. In a 1UP.com retrospective article, Matt Loene claimed the game failed to obtain fans upon release, in part due to the character illustrations.

Outside critical response, The King of Fighters 2001 was awarded "Best Annual Income Award" in the 3rd Arcadia Awards from the Monthly Arcadia. The game was followed by The King of Fighters 2002, which does not have an original storyline. Early in development, The King of Fighters 2002 was meant to remove the Striker System from the NESTS trilogy due to negative feedback. Development was also done by Brezza Soft. K9999 became absent due to apparent copyright violation as most of his design and powers are borrowed from the character Tetsuo from the 1988 film Akira. Tetsuo’s voice actor, Nozomu Sasaki, was also hired to voice K9999 in the game.
