= Draglade =

2007 video game

- Developer: Dimps
- Publishers: JP: Banpresto; NA: Atlus; EU: 505 Games
- Platform: Nintendo DS
- Release: 2007
- Genres: Fighting, Music, RPG
- Mode: Single player

Draglade (カスタムビートバトル ドラグレイド, Kasutamu Bīto Batoru Doragureido; Custom Beat Battle Draglade) is a fighting video game with music video game and role-playing game elements for the Nintendo DS developed by Dimps and published in Japan by Banpresto and Bandai Namco Games. It was then later published in the US by Atlus.

The fighting system is different from other fighting games in that there are not a lot of directional inputs needed for moves. Instead, special moves are set by collecting "Bullets" and then activating them with the DS's touch screen.

== Characters and premise ==
Draglade is set in a post-modern world powered by "Matter", this energy can be absorbed by technology known as a G-Con, which can be transformed into a weapon called a Glade. Individuals fight using these Glades in a popular sport names Grapping. Four of these characters with their own stories are playable. They are Daichu, Guy, Hibito and Kyle.

=== Character plots ===
==== Daichi ====
This follows the story of Daichi, who is from a village where the residents are able to communicate with animals. Daichi is chosen for a mission to help these animals, and decides to train as a Grapper in the hopes of becoming a Master Grapper. Daichi progresses through the various cities, and eventually encounters the Mad Company. Daichi battles the Mad Company and their leader, President D, who is ultimately consumed by darkness and defeated.

==== Guy ====
A former member of the Black Fang gang, Guy begins Grapping using legitimate means to seek redemption for past mistakes. The story follows Guy taking Grap exams and being emotionally manipulated by somebody called Gyamon into going back to his old ways. Guy meets Shelly, who dislikes Black Fang due to what they did to her brother. Guy teams up with the other characters to take down the Mad Company and earns Shelly's respect in the process.

==== Hibito ====
This story follows young boy Hibito who was previously rescued by a Master Grapper. Hibito pursues of dream of Grapping against his grandfather's advice. The game follows his journey and his first confrontation with the Mad Company, who kidnap his family. Teaming up with the other characters, Hibito helps rescue those who have kidnapped from the Mad Company and becomes a Master Grapper.

==== Kyle ====
Kyle seeks the cash prize awarded to Master Grappers to help his father out of debt. Journeying by water, Kyle participates in battles along the coast. After encountering the DoraDora Dan gang, Kyle faces the Mad Company with the other characters, wins the tournament and pays off his father's debt, earning his title of Master Grapper.

== Reception ==
Reception

Aggregate score
Aggregator	Score
Metacritic	71/100

Review scores
Publication	Score
IGN	7/10
Nintendo World Report	8.5/10

Draglade scored 71/100 on the website aggregator Metacritic from a total of 23 reviews.

IGN criticized the simplicity of the game's story, describing the UI as being present "in a dozen other games" like Draglade, though gave appreciation to the music-oriented combat style and multiplayer options, scoring the title 7 out of 10. Nintendo World Report writer Steven Rodriguez praised Draglade's combat system and customisation options, but disliked that the game had to be replayed multiple times for hidden characters to unlock, specifying repetitiveness. Rodriguez scored Draglade 8.5 out of 10. Cyril Lachel writing for DefunctGames compared Draglade with the rhythm mechanics of Beatmania and the grap battles to Flame of Recca. Lachel lambasted the lengthy plot, describing it as "boring", but praised its ability to remain engaging, grading the game B minus.

== Sequel ==
A sequel was released in Japan and the United States called Custom Beat Battle: Draglade 2 on 10 July 2008.
