= Neolith (company) =

South Korean video game company

Neolith Co., Ltd. 네오리스
- Type: Private
- Industry: Video games
- Founded: April 30, 1996 (as Eolith), May 16, 2008 (as Neolith)
- Defunct: 2005 (defunct as Eolith)
- Fate: Acquired by NetBrain
- Headquarters: Gangnam-gu, Seoul, South Korea
- Key people: Jeon Juyoung (CEO: April 1996–March 2004); Choe Jeongho (CEO: March 2004–March 2005)Choe Sangdeok: CEO (March 2005-2006)Choe Hyeonjeong(CEO 2008- )
- Products: Arcade games, and Mobile games
- Owner: independent company (1996-2001) independent company, SNK, Taito, CCR and GV Inc (2001-2005) independent company, NetBrain (2008-)

Neolith Co., Ltd. (Korean: 네오리스), formerly known as Eolith Co., Ltd. (이오리스) is a South Korean-based video game company, best known for co-developing The King of Fighters 2001 with BrezzaSoft and The King of Fighters 2002: Challenge to Ultimate Battle with Playmore, as well as their Hidden Catch series.

== History ==
The company was founded as Eolith on April 30, 1996. They developed The King of Fighters 2001 and The King of Fighters 2002 after SNK was bankrupted. Their last title released as Eolith was Chaos Breaker, for the arcade system Taito Type X. Although the company was founded as an independent company, Kum Gang initially published their early arcade games. In 2000, they started a small chain of arcades called G-Park. On June 7, 2000, they registered at KOSDAQ as the first Korean arcade game maker. Besides video games, their redemption games El Dorado won the Ministry of Culture and Tourism Game of the Month June 2001 award, and Mugunghwa Kkot-i Pieosseumnida (English: The roses of Sharon have blossomed, known as Hide and Seek outside of Korea) won the Game of the Month November 2001 and Arcade Game of the Year 2001 awards.

In 2000, the company M-Dream was founded by a former Eolith employee. M-Dream specialized in developing mobile games. They also developed several online games, and localized and published a number of PS2 and PC games. In November 2002, the subsidiary M-Dream China was formed. In 2003, Eolith merged with M-Dream, and Choe Jeongho became the new CEO. On June 3, 2005, Eolith was bought out by Netbrain, who was later integrated into the pharma company Neurotech and thoroughly restructured. Neurotech was renamed to Neurotech Pharma on November 8, 2006, and that same day, Eolith shut down. M-Dream became a separate company again, and continued to publish mobile games until 2007 when they were also shut down. Although M-Dream was shut down, M-Dream China was still active, but their website disappeared in 2018.

On May 16, 2008, the company was rebranded as Neolith and it was formed from the remnants of Eolith. Neolith received government support of 160,000,000 won but never showed much as a result.

== List of games ==
=== As Eolith/M-Dream ===
==== Classic series ====
- Screaming Hunter (1996)
- Grand Prix Derby (1997)
- Ksana (1997)
- Hidden Catch [known as Find the Wrong Picture '98 in Korea] (1998)
- Iron Fortress (1998)
- Linky Pipe (1998)
- Puzzle King: Dance & Puzzle (1998)
- Raccoon World (1998)
- Candy Candy (1999)
- Hidden Catch 2 [known as Find the Wrong Picture 2 in Korea] (1999)
- Hidden Catch 2000 [known as Find the Wrong Picture 2000 in Korea] (1999)
- KlonDike+ (1999)
- Land Breaker (1999)
- Music Station (1999)
- New Hidden Catch [known as New Find the Wrong Picture '98 in Korea] (1999)
- Penfan Girls: Step1. Mild Mind [known as Ribbon: Step1. Mild Mind in Japan] (1999)
- Hidden Catch 3 [known as Find the Wrong Picture 3 in Korea] (2000)
- Steal See (2000; developed by Moov Generation)
- Fortress 2 Blue Arcade (2001)
- Hidden Catch 3 Plus [known as Find the Wrong Picture 3 Plus in Korea] (2001)
- The King of Fighters 2001 (2001; published by SNK) - co-developed with BrezzaSoft
- Crazy War (2002)
- The King of Fighters 2002 (2002; published by Playmore) - co-developed with Playmore
- BnB Arcade (2003; developed by Nexon)
- Burning Striker (2003)
- Hidden Catch Movie: Wonderful Days [known as Find the Wrong Picture Movie: Wonderful Days in Korea] (2003)
- Chaos Breaker [known as Dark Awake: The King Has No Name on PlayStation 3] (2004; co-developed with Taito)
- Snow Fighter (2004; developed by Cenozoic Entertainment)
- X-Monster (2004, cancelled)

==== Redemption series ====
- Dance Machine 18 [also known as DM 18] (2000)
- Mugunghwa Kkot-i Pieosseumnida [English: The Roses of Sharon Have Blossomed, known as Hide and Seek outside of Korea] (2001)
- Dream Shoot (2002)
- El Dorado (2002, distributed by Skee-Ball in the USA)
- Rolling Blues (2002)
- Shooting Master (2002)
- Alice in Cardland (2003)

==== For mobile phones ====
- 2003 Ponpoko
- Bubble Bobble
- Bubble Bobble 2
- Bunny Girl Matgo
- Chain Shot
- Deep Labyrinth
- Donggeupsaeng: Part 1
- Donggeupsaeng: Part 2
- Donggeupsaeng: Part 3
- Double Dragon
- First Groove
- Fishing Master
- Galaga
- Gateun Geurim Chatgi
- Guardian Storm (unrelated to the 1998 arcade game by Afega)
- Heroes: Pride of Hero
- Hwanggeum-ui Daeryuk
- Ikkeul Mikkeul Kung
- Janggi Alkkagi
- Jeoncharo Go! 3D
- Junggi Gapbobyeong X
- The King of Fighters: Part 1
- The King of Fighters: Part 2
- Linkle Harmony
- Meoseum Mandeulgi
- Moon Patrol
- Mr. Driller
- Myeongpum Matgo
- Narsillion
- New Rally-X
- Pac-Man
- Pang Panic
- Pinball Dragoon
- Puzzle Bobble
- Puzznic
- Rally-X
- Ring King
- Safari Hunter
- Samurai Shodown: Part 1
- Shooting Soccer 2002
- Street Fighter III
- Tajja Go Stop
- Tajja Poker
- Teullin Geurim Chatgi
- Touch Me
- Worms
- Yageun Saweon Pak Daeri

=== As Neolith ===
- CupSong Master (2008)
- PangPang Mini (2009)
- Chuck E's Ball Blast (2009, Chuck E. Cheese's version of PangPang Mini)
- Hidden Catch 5 [known as Find the Wrong Pictures 5 in Korea] (2010)
- Treasure Quest (2011, licensed from ICE)
