= Fight Fever =

1994 video game

- Developer: Viccom (Note: Additional assistance by SNK)
- Publishers: KOR: Viccom; WW: SNK
- Platform: Arcade
- Release: JP: 28 June 1994; WW: July 1994; KOR: September 1994
- Genre: Fighting
- Modes: Single-player, multiplayer
- Arcade system: Neo Geo MVS

Fight Fever (Note: Japanese: ファイト・フィーバー, Hepburn: Faito Fībā; also known as Wang Jung Wang (왕중왕, lit. "The King of Kings") in South Korea) is a 1994 fighting game for the Neo Geo MVS arcade system. It is the first South Korean-developed Neo Geo title ever officially released, as well as the first game developed and released by the Korean publisher of SNK games, Viccom (빅콤). A release for Neo Geo CD was also showcased but did not occur.

== Gameplay ==
Gameplay screenshot showcasing a match between Kim Hoon and Han Baedal in South Korea.

The game plays similarly to other 2D versus fighting games, especially both SNK's Fatal Fury 2 and Art of Fighting. In fact, it shapes itself after Fatal Fury 2 while it uses Art of Fighting's game engine. There are 8 characters to select from and two boss characters (the first boss character is only playable in two player mode). The object of the game is to win two matches out of three. Each character has a set of moves in addition to two basic punches and kicks. Each character also has a super move called a "Danger Move", which are similar to the Desperation Moves from Fatal Fury 2. Players also have the ability to taunt others, but unlike games such as Art of Fighting, this has no effect and would actually leave the player open to attacks.

There are two bonus games that reward the player with points dependent on how successful the player is. The first game is a brick-breaking game that requires rapid pressing of the A button. The second bonus game requires the player to break boards held up by trainers popping out of the left and right sides. Both bonus games were also in Capcom's 1987 arcade game, Street Fighter, as well as one of them also in Midway's 1992 arcade game, Mortal Kombat and the ones in Art of Fighting.

== Fighters ==
- (South Korea) Han Baedal – The protagonist of the game. A taekwondo expert who appears to be a cross between Ryu and Ryo Sakazaki.
- (Japan) Miyuki – A dancer and only female character in the game.
- (Germany) Rophen Heimer – A German bartender and martial artist.
- (United States) Magic Dunker – A basketball player who is most likely named after Magic Johnson.
- (Brazil) Golrio – A fat indigenous Brazilian warrior with the ability to throw fireballs and spin around quickly against his opponents.
- (United States) Nick Commando – A large masked soldier who can throw grenades and charge at the foe.
- (China) Chintao – A Chinese Shaolin monk.
- (Mexico) Kim Hoon – A palette-edit, semi-clone and rival of Han Baedal.
- (South Korea) Master Taekuk – An old taekwondo master who can stretch out his arms and slam the opponent.
- (Japan) Karate Kenji – The final boss of the game. He was voiced by Masaki Usui, who also voiced Ryo Sakazaki from the Art of Fighting series and Haohmaru from the Samurai Shodown series.

== Development ==
Viccom was founded and headquartered in Daejeon, South Korea in 1991 by president Kim Jaehoon (김재훈) and led by chairman Kim Kap-hwan (김갑환). While the Neo-Geo and its library became successful worldwide, SNK and Viccom became partners and published Neo-Geo titles to South Korea. At the same time, Kim Kap-hwan requested some development tools and staff from SNK to create and release Wang Jung Wang in South Korea and retitle it as Fight Fever for other regions.
