= The King of Fighters 2002 =

2002 video game

The King of Fighters 2002: Challenge to Ultimate Battle
- Developers: Eolith; SNK Playmore (PS2/Xbox); DotEmu (PC)
- Publisher: Playmore: Sun Amusement (AES) Ignition Entertainment (PS2/Xbox) SNK (PC) HAMSTER Corporation (PS4/Switch/Xbox One)
- Director: Lee Seon Ho
- Producer: Chil Suk Choi
- Designer: Ruyun
- Programmers: M. Yusuke; S. Fujinuki; T. Hayashi
- Artists: Chikara Yamasaki; Hiroaki Hashimoto; Masae M.
- Composers: Masahiko Hataya; Yasuo Yamate
- Series: The King of Fighters
- Platform: Arcade: Dreamcast, Microsoft Windows, Neo Geo AES, PlayStation 2, Xbox
- Release: October 10, 2002: Arcade; WW: October 10, 2002 Neo Geo AES; WW: 19 December 2002 Dreamcast; JP: June 19, 2003 PlayStation 2; JP: March 25, 2004; NA: February 8, 2005; EU: October 7, 2005 Xbox; JP: March 24, 2005; EU: November 2005
- Genre: Fighting
- Modes: Single-player, multiplayer
- Arcade system: Neo Geo MVS

The King of Fighters 2002: Challenge to Ultimate Battle (Note: Japanese: ザ・キング・オブ・ファイターズ 2002 チャレンジ トゥ アルティメットバトル, Hepburn: Za Kingu Obu Faitāzu 2002: Charenji tu Arutimetto Batoru), also shortened as KOF 2002, is a 2002 fighting game developed by Eolith and published by Playmore for the Neo Geo. It is the ninth installment in The King of Fighters series, the second to be produced by Eolith and the first to not have any involvement from the original SNK. Similar to The King of Fighters '98, it brings together characters from various SNK franchises and has a diverse roster of fighters. The game maintains the original series' roster of three characters per team that face each other until reaching the victory of one team.

Due to negative feedback regarding the Striker System from the previous NESTS video games, Eolith removed it in favor of the original one. Among multiple characters, a clone of the protagonist Kyo Kusanagi was created under the name of Kusanagi, featuring his classic outfit and moves to appeal to veteran gamers. In 2003, the game was ported to the Dreamcast in Japan, followed by global ports to the PlayStation 2 in 2004 and Xbox in 2005, both of which were released in North America in a two-in-one bundle with the following game in the series, The King of Fighters 2003.

The game was praised for bringing back the features that made The King of Fighters '98 appealing, involving the classic roster and the original system. However, there was also negative feedback regarding the lack of new features. A sequel titled The King of Fighters 2003 was released by SNK the next year. In 2009, SNK Playmore produced a remake titled The King of Fighters 2002 Unlimited Match for the PlayStation 2, released in Japan, and worldwide on Xbox Live Arcade in 2010.

== Gameplay ==
Example of Kyo Kusanagi (left) in MAX mode, using his stronger moves to attack Whip (right)

The King of Fighters 2002 is a 2d fighting game that uses the 3-on-3 battle format where players control there characters in contrast to previous installments which offered assistants.

The game also revamps the Power Gauge system into a format similar to the one used in The King of Fighters '97. Like the previous games in the series, the Power Gauge is filled as the player attacks the opponent or performs Special Moves during a battle. The number of Power Gauges the player can stock up is increased by one with each member of the team. For example, the first member of the team can stock up to three Power Gauges, while the third member can stock up to five. A single Power Gauge stock can be used to perform either a Counterattack and Evasion technique while guarding an opponent's attack, use a Super Special Move, or initiate the MAX Activation state. The same case also applies to the 1-on-1 format, where the number of Power Gauges the player can stock up is also increased by one with each round lost. For example, in the first round, the player can stock up to three Power Gauges, while losing two rounds allows the player to stock up to five.

During MAX Activation, the player's offensive and defensive strength is increased for a short period, and they can cancel any attack into another. In this state, a Super Special Move can be used without consuming a Power Gauge stock. There are also MAX Super Special Moves, which are Super moves that can only be performed during MAX Activation with one Power Gauge stock, and MAX2 moves that require two stocks while low on health.

The King of Fighters supported online multiplayer on the original Xbox via Xbox Live. Online support for original Xbox games was terminated in 2010. The game is supported online on Insignia, a revival server restoring online multiplayer for original Xbox games.

== Characters ==
Just like The King of Fighters '98, the game has no storyline. In addition to the recurring teams from the series, including the original Japan Team, the game also features a sequence of teams representing each of the previous games in the series from The King of Fighters '96 to The King of Fighters 2001. Omega Rugal returns as the final boss as well. However, not all the characters from the previous games are featured, and series regulars such as King and Shingo Yabuki are absent from the Neo Geo version for the first time since their first appearances. The console versions of the game, nevertheless, feature King and Shingo; the PS2 and Xbox versions have Geese Howard, Goenitz, and Orochi Iori included.

Japan Team

- Kyo Kusanagi
- Benimaru Nikaido
- Goro Daimon

Fatal Fury Team

- Terry Bogard
- Andy Bogard
- Joe Higashi

Art of Fighting Team

- Ryo Sakazaki
- Robert Garcia
- Takuma Sakazaki

Ikari Team

- Leona Heidern
- Ralf Jones
- Clark Still

Psycho Soldier Team

- Athena Asamiya
- Sie Kensou
- Chin Gentsai

Women Fighters Team

- Mai Shiranui
- Yuri Sakazaki
- May Lee

Korea Team

- Kim Kaphwan
- Chang Koehan
- Choi Bounge

Yagami Team

- Iori Yagami
- Mature
- Vice

97 Special Team

- Ryuji Yamazaki
- Blue Mary
- Billy Kane

Orochi Team / Awakened Orochi Team

- Yashiro Nanakase / Orochi Yashiro
- Shermie / Orochi Shermie
- Chris / Orochi Chris

K' Team

- K′
- Maxima
- Whip

Agent Team

- Vanessa
- Seth
- Ramón

NESTS Team

- Kula Diamond
- K9999
- Ángel

Single entry

- Geese Howard (Note: Exclusive to PS2 and Xbox versions)
- Goenitz
- Orochi Iori
- King (Note: Exclusive to console versions)
- Kusanagi
- Omega Rugal (Note: Boss character)
- Shingo Yabuki

== Development and release ==
Early in development of The King of Fighters 2002 was meant to remove the Striker System from the previous trilogy of the series due to negative feedback. Development was also done by Brezza Soft. There were not major plans for the story as if it could be another NESTS game despite The King of Fighters 2001 ending it. Due to the culmination of the NESTS story arc from previous installments, Eolith decided to mix elements from such as arc with the first Orochi story arc, resulting in a cast that reunites characters from both narratives. There was a proper focus in bringing back Rugal Bernstein who starred as the final boss from previous installment but with new updated moves. The enemy AI was toned down when compared to previous games.

Nona was in charge of the illustrations, leading to mysteries about the main characters of this installment. Since The King of Fighters 2001 was aimed towards a Korean audience, SNK noted there are about 4 million KOF fans in the country. There have been many posts about it on various websites. The Tactical Order System in particular seemed to be popular with players. The team expressed complications with pleasing both Koreans and Japanese with rise of popularity of the franchise. The series' protagonist Kyo Kusanagi remained popular within fans after the NESTS arc which resulted in the team's decision to create a clone of him, Kusanagi, wearing his high school uniform which the original Kyo dropped in The King of Fighters '99. While the game gives Kusanagi no narrative like the other characters, Kusanagi would be given a backstory in The King of Fighters 2003.

The game's original arcade was released on October 10, 2002 in the MVS Circuit Board and was ported to multiple console versions including the Neo Geo on December 19 from the same year, the Sega Dreamcast on June 19, 2003, Sony's PlayStation 2 on March 25, 2004 and the Xbox on March 24, 2005. In North America, the game was released alongside The King of Fighters 2003 for the PlayStation 2 and Xbox on September 8, 2006. It was emulated for the Nintendo Switch in July 2025 as part of a series of games.

== Reception ==
Reception

Review scores
Publication	Score
MeriStation	5/10
Maniac	5/5
Defunct Games	B-
TouchArcade	3.5/5

=== Critical response ===
The original The King of Fighters 2002 was regarded by Hardcore Gaming 101 as the high point of the franchise for its cast and balanced gameplay. They also noticed the developers were able to improved the visuals and feel similar to The King of Fighters '98 for removing the Striker System and going back to the original character rooster. The amount of characters alongside its revamped fighting engine appealed to GameSpot to the point of declaring as one of the best in 2D fighters. Man!ac gave it a perfect score, praising the Korean developers at Eolith for making a game as appealing as SNK's own "dream match" game, The King of Fighters '98, thanks to the variety the cast has as well as removing the Striker System from the NESTS games, claiming it was poorly executed. The writer also praised the distinct visuals of each stage and how the gameplay was polished. IGN was glad with how the game mixed old characters and new characters to create a more unique cast. Despite lamenting the removal of Strikers, IGN praised the new gameplay mechanics as well as notable visual improvement.

MeriStation was more critical to the removal of its Striker system as it recycled the old style alongside the boss Rugal Bernstein without offering the players anything to stand out within the franchise. GameRevolution said that game also feels another take on The King of Fighters '98 due to its gathering of classic characters but lamented it suffered from poor graphics that feel dated. DefuncGames said while the game maintains the series' appeal thanks to its large cast, it did not do much differ from the previous yearly releases, making the experience repetitive. In retrospect, TouchArcade considered it a throwback to better KOF games as Eolith removed the Striker feature from the NESTS games and went back to the classic formula from the Orochi games which appealed more to the audience. The reviewer compared it to SNK's Samurai Shodown IV as both are appealing installments as long as touch controls to fully enjoy the game but lamented how SNK did not implement online play in the port yet.

=== Legacy ===
Heavily popular in Latin America, bootlegged Rom hacks that altered the content became common in such region though such hacks annoyed players according to Kotaku.

An official remake of KOF 2002, The King of Fighters 2002: Unlimited Match was released on February 26, 2009 for the PlayStation 2 in Japan. SNK wanted to remake The King of Fighters 2002 similar to how they previously did with The King of Fighters '98. In contrast to the King of Fighters '98 remake which tried emulating the original's feel, Unlimited Match had most of the visual content remade including character select screen and menus. Due to apparent copyright violations with K9999, a new character called Nameless was designed to take his place in the remake.

A sequel titled The King of Fighters 2003 was released by SNK. Unlike The King of Fighters 2002, KOF 2003 was given a new characters and a tagging gameplay, allowing the player to use the three characters in real time.
