= Fighting Bujutsu =

1997 video game

- North American arcade flyer
- Developer: Konami
- Publisher: Konami
- Director: Kazuya Takahashi
- Producer: Hiroyasu Machiguchi
- Composers: Mutsuhiko Izumi; Naoki Maeda
- Platform: Arcade
- Release: August 1997
- Genre: Fighting
- Modes: Single player, multiplayer
- Arcade system: Konami Cobra

Fighting Bujutsu, known in Japan as Fighting Wu-Shu (FIGHTING武術 (ファイティングうーしゅ), lit. "Martial Fighting"), is a 1997 3D fighting arcade game developed and published by Konami, released on their Konami Cobra arcade board. It is Konami's second attempt in the 3D fighting game market, after their Lightning Legend: Daigo no Daibouken in 1996, and was released only in arcades.

== Gameplay ==
Much like Sega's Virtua Fighter 2, Fighting Bujutsu utilizes a control scheme consisting of a control stick and three buttons: Punch, Kick, and Guard. A Beginner Mode maps combo techniques to individual buttons.

== Development and release ==
Fighting Bujutsu was unveiled as one of the first games powered by the Konami Cobra System Hardware (the other being Racing Jam) in a 10-minute videotape shown at the 1997 ASI arcade show. At this point it had no working title, and was referred to only by the codename "PF 573". It was shown again at that year's JAMMA show, by which time it was named Fighting Wu-Shu. According to Next Generation, there was "some question of how (or if) to present [Fighting Wu-Shu] to the U.S. market." The game made its U.S. debut, now under the title Fighting Bujutsu, at the AMOA Expo in Atlanta in October 1997. It first appeared in the UK at the January 1998 Amusement Trades Exhibition International in London.

On January 21, 1998, an official soundtrack of Fighting Bujutsu's background music was published by Konami and distributed by King Records exclusively in Japan as Fighting Wu-Shu Original Game Soundtrack (FIGHTING武術 オリジナル・ゲーム・サントラ).

== Reception ==
In Japan, Game Machine listed Fighting Bujutsu on their November 15, 1997 issue as being the eighth most-successful dedicated arcade game of the month.
