= List of arcade video games: B =

This is a list of arcade video games organized alphabetically by name. It does not include PC or console games unless they were also released in video arcades. See Lists of video games for related lists.

| Title | Alternate Title(s) | Year | Manufacturer | Genre(s) | Max. Players | PCB Model |
|---|---|---|---|---|---|---|
| B-Wings | — | 1984 | Data East | Shoot 'em up | 2 | |
| B.C. Story | — | 1997 | SemiCom | Sports | 2 | |
| B. Rap Boys | — | 1992 | Kaneko | Beat 'em up | 3 | |
| B. Rap Boys Special | — | 1992 | Kaneko | Beat 'em up | 3 | |
| B.O.T.S.S: Battle of the Solar System | — | 1991 | Jaleco | | 1 | |
| Baby Boom Challenge | — | 1986 | Merit Industries | Educational video game | | |
| Back Fire | — | 1988 | Tecmo | Scrolling shooter | 2 | |
| Back Street Soccer | — | 1996 | SunA Electronics | Sports | | |
| Backfire! | — | 1995 | Data East | Racing | 2 | |
| Bad Dudes Vs. DragonNinja | Dragonninja ^{JP} | 1988 | Data East | Beat 'em up | 2 | |
| Badlands (Atari) | — | 1989 | Atari Games | Racing | 2 | |
| Badlands (Konami) | — | 1984 | Konami | Action game | 1 | |
| Bagman | Le Bagnard | 1982 | Valadon Automation | Platformer | 2 | |
| Baka Tono-sama Mahjong Manyuki | — | 1991 | Monolith Corp. | Mahjong video game | 1 | NeoGeo |
| Baku Baku Animal: Sekai Shiikugakari Senshu-ken | — | 1995 | Sega | | | |
| Bakuretsu Quiz Ma-Q Dai Bōken | — | 1992 | Namco | | | |
| Bal Cube | — | 1996 | Metro | Puzzle | | |
| Balance Try | — | 1996 | Namco | Rhythm | | |
| Balloon Bomber | T.T Balloon Bomber | 1980 | Taito | | | |
| Balloon Brothers | — | 1992 | East Technology | | | |
| Bally Midway's Jump Shot | — | 1985 | Bally/Midway | Sport | 2 | |
| Baluba-Louk No Densetsu | — | 1986 | Able | | | |
| Bang Bang Ball | — | 1996 | Banpresto | | | |
| Bang Bead | — | 2001 | Visco | Breakout | 2 | NeoGeo |
| Bang! | Gun Gabacho ^{JP} | 1998 | Gaelco | | | |
| Bank Panic | — | 1984 | Sega | | | |
| Baraduke | Alien Sector | 1985 | Namco | Scrolling shooter | 2 | |
| Baraduke II | Bakutotsu Kijūtei | 1988 | Namco | Scrolling shooter | 2 | Namco System 1 |
| Barricade | Brickyard | 1976 | RamTeK | | | |
| Barricade II | — | 1977 | Taito | | | |
| Barrier | — | 1979 | Vectorbeam | Maze | 2 | |
| Baryon: Future Assault | — | 1997 | SemiCom | Scrolling shooter | 2 | |
| Baseball | — | 1974 | Seeburg Corp | Sports | | |
| Baseball Stars 2 | — | 1992 | SNK | Sports | | NeoGeo |
| Baseball Stars Professional | — | 1990 | SNK | Sports | | NeoGeo |
| Baseball The Season II | — | 1987 | Leland | Sports | 2 | |
| Batman | — | 1991 | Atari | Beat 'em up | 1 | |
| Batman | — | 2014 | Raw Thrills | Light gun shooter | 1 | |
| Batman Forever: The Arcade Game | — | 1996 | Acclaim | Beat 'em up | | |
| Batsugun | — | 1993 | Toaplan | Scrolling shooter | 2 | |
| Batsugun Special Version | — | 1993 | Toaplan | Scrolling shooter | 2 | |
| Battlantis | — | 1987 | Konami | Fixed shooter | 2 | |
| Battle Arena Toshinden 2 | — | 1995 | Takara | Fighting | 2 | ZN-1 |
| Battle Bakraid | — | 1999 | Raizing | Scrolling shooter | 2 | |
| Battle Balls | Senkyu | 1995 | Seibu Kaihatsu | Puzzle | 2 | |
| Battle Chopper | Mr. Heli no Daibouken | 1987 | Irem | Scrolling shooter | 2 | |
| Battle Circuit | — | 1997 | Capcom | Beat 'em up | 2 | CPS2 |
| Battle Cross | — | 1982 | Omori Electric | | | |
| Battle Cruiser M-12 | — | 1983 | Sigma Enterprises Inc. | | | |
| Battle Flip Shot | — | 1998 | Visco | | | NeoGeo |
| Battle Garegga | — | 1996 | 8ing/Raizing | Scrolling shooter | 2 | |
| Battle Gear | — | 1999 | Taito | Racing | 2 | |
| Battle Gear 2 | — | 2000 | Taito | Racing | 2 | |
| Battle Gear 3 | — | 2002 | Taito | Racing | 2 | |
| Battle K-Road | — | 1994 | Psikyo | Fighting | 2 | |
| Battle Lane Vol. 5 | — | 1986 | Technōs Japan | | | |
| Battle of Atlantis | — | 1981 | Comsoft | | | |
| The Battle of Yu Yu Hakusho: Shitou! Ankoku Bujutsukai! | — | 2006 | Banpresto | Fighting | 2 | |
| Battle Shark | — | 1989 | Taito | Shooting gallery | | |
| Battle Tryst | Battle Vision | 1998 | Konami | Fighting | 2 | Konami M2 |
| The Battle-Road | — | 1984 | Irem | | | |
| BattleCry | — | 1991 | Home Data | | | |
| BattleFront | — | 2005 | TJF | | | |
| Battletoads | Super Battletoads | 1994 | Rare | Beat 'em up | 3 | |
| Battlezone | — | 1980 | Atari | Simulation game | 1 | |
| Bay Route | — | 1989 | Sega | Run and gun | 2 | |
| Bazooka | Cross Fire | 1977 | Taito | | | |
| Beach Festival World Championship 1997 | — | 1997 | Comad | | | |
| Beach Head 2000 | — | 2000 | Global VR | | | |
| Beach Head 2002 | — | 2002 | Global VR | | | |
| Beach Head 2003: Desert War | — | 2003 | Global VR | | | |
| Beach Spikers | — | 2001 | Sega | | | |
| Beam Invader | — | 1979 | Tekunon Kougyou | | | |
| Beast Busters | — | 1989 | SNK | | | |
| Beast Busters: Second Nightmare | — | 1998 | SNK | | | Hyper NeoGeo 64 |
| Beat Player 2000 | — | 2000 | Comad | | | |
| Beat the Champ | — | 1996 | Konami | | | |
| Beatmania | — | 1997 | Konami | Music video game | 2 | |
| Beatmania 2nd Mix | — | 1998 | Konami | Music video game | 2 | |
| Beatmania 3rd Mix | — | 1998 | Konami | Music video game | 2 | |
| beatmania 4thMix: the beat goes on | — | 1999 | Konami | Music video game | 2 | |
| beatmania 5thMix: Time to get down | — | 1999 | Konami | Music video game | 2 | |
| beatmania 6thMix: The UK Underground Music | — | 2001 | Konami | Music video game | 2 | |
| beatmania 7thMix: keepin' Evolution | — | 2002 | Konami | Music video game | 2 | |
| beatmania ClubMix | — | 2000 | Konami | Music video game | 2 | |
| beatmania complete MIX | hiphopmania Complete MIX | 1999 | Konami | Music video game | 2 | |
| beatmania complete MIX 2 | hiphopmania Complete MIX 2 | 2000 | Konami | Music video game | 2 | |
| beatmania CORE REMIX | — | 2000 | Konami | Music video game | 2 | |
| beatmania featuring Dreams Come True | — | 2000 | Konami | Music video game | 2 | |
| beatmania IIDX | — | 1999 | Konami | Music video game | 2 | |
| beatmania IIDX 2nd style | — | 1999 | Konami | Music video game | 2 | |
| beatmania IIDX 3rd style | — | 2000 | Konami | Music video game | 2 | |
| beatmania IIDX 4th style | — | 2000 | Konami | Music video game | 2 | |
| beatmania IIDX 5th style | — | 2001 | Konami | Music video game | 2 | |
| beatmania IIDX 6th style | — | 2001 | Konami | Music video game | 2 | |
| beatmania IIDX 7th style | — | 2002 | Konami | Music video game | 2 | |
| beatmania IIDX 8th style | — | 2002 | Konami | Music video game | 2 | |
| beatmania IIDX substream | — | 1999 | Konami | Music video game | 2 | |
| beatmania III | — | 2000 | Konami | Music video game | 2 | |
| beatmania III APPEND 6thMIX | — | 2001 | Konami | Music video game | 2 | |
| beatmania III APPEND 7thMIX | — | 2002 | Konami | Music video game | 2 | |
| beatmania III APPEND CORE REMIX | — | 2001 | Konami | Music video game | 2 | |
| beatmania III: THE FINAL | — | 2003 | Konami | Music video game | 2 | |
| beatmania THE FINAL | — | 2002 | Konami | Music video game | 2 | |
| Beatstage 4th MIX: The Beat Goes On | — | 1999 | Konami | Music video game | 2 | |
| Beauty Block | — | 1991 | AMT | | 1 | |
| Bee Storm: DoDonPachi II | — | 2001 | IGS | | | |
| Beeline | — | 1991 | Bell-Fruit | | 1 | |
| Beezer | — | 1982 | Tong | | 2 | |
| Bega's Battle | — | 1983 | Data East | | | |
| Behind Enemy Lines | — | 1998 | Sega; EPL Productions | | | |
| Bells & Whistles | Detana!! TwinBee ^{JP} | 1991 | Konami | Vertical shooter | 2 | |
| Ben Bero Beh | — | 1984 | Taito | | | |
| Ben Hur | — | 2000 | Multimedia Content | | | |
| The Berenstain Bears in Big Paw's Cave | — | 1983 | Enter-Tech | | | |
| The Berlin Wall | — | 1991 | Kaneko | | | |
| Bermuda Triangle | — | 1987 | SNK | | | |
| Berzerk | — | 1980 | Stern Electronics | Shooter game | 2 | |
| Best Bout Boxing | — | 1994 | Jaleco | Fighting | 2 | |
| Best of Best | — | 1994 | SunA Electronics | Fighting | 2 | |
| Bestri | — | 1998 | F2 System | | | |
| Big Apple Games | — | 1986 | Merit | | | |
| Big Buck Hunter | — | 2000 | Play Mechanix, Inc. Raw Thrills | | | |
| Big Buck Hunter 2006: Call of the Wild | — | 2006 | Incredible Technologies | | | |
| Big Buck Hunter II: Sportsman's Paradise | — | 2002 | Incredible Technologies | | | |
| Big Buck Hunter: Shooter's Challenge | — | 2002 | Incredible Technologies | | | |
| Big Bucks Trivia | — | 1986 | Dynasoft | | | |
| Big Casino | — | 1984 | Status Games | | | |
| Big Event Golf | — | 1986 | Taito | | | |
| Big Fight: Big Trouble in the Atlantic Ocean | — | 1992 | Tatsumi | | | |
| The Big Joke | — | 1988 | Greyhound Electronics | | | |
| Big Karnak | — | 1991 | Gaelco | Platformer | 2 | |
| Big Run | — | 1989 | Jaleco | Racing | | |
| Big Striker | — | 1992 | Jaleco | Sports | | |
| Big Twin | — | 1995 | Playmark | | | |
| Bigfoot Bonkers | — | 1976 | Meadows Games | | | |
| Bijokko Gakuen | — | 1988 | Nichibutsu | | | |
| Bijokko Yume Monogatari | — | 1987 | Nichibutsu | | | |
| Bikkuri Card | — | 1987 | | | | |
| Bikkuri Pro Wrestling | — | 1988 | Nichibutsu | | | |
| Billard List | — | 1995 | DGRM | | | |
| Billiard | — | 1988 | Terminal | | | |
| Bingo (Cal Omega) | — | 1982 | Cal Omega | | | |
| Bingo (GAT) | — | 1983 | GAT | | | |
| Bingo (Wing) | — | 1993 | Wing | | | |
| Bingo Mania | — | 1993 | HP Automaten | | | |
| Bingo Roll: Bellstar | — | 2002 | | | | |
| Bio F.R.E.A.K.S. | — | 1998 | Saffire | Fighting | 2 | |
| Biomechanical Toy | — | 1995 | Gaelco | | | |
| Bionic Commando | Top Secret ^{JP} | 1987 | Capcom | Platformer | 2 | |
| Bio-Attack | — | 1983 | Taito | Scrolling shooter | 2 | |
| Bio-ship Paladin | — | 1991 | UPL | Scrolling shooter | 2 | |
| BiPlane | — | 1976 | Fun Games, Inc. | | | |
| BiPlane 4 | — | 1976 | Fun Games, Inc. | | | |
| Birdie King | — | 1982 | Taito | Sports | 2 | |
| Birdie King 2 | — | 1983 | Taito | Sports | 2 | |
| Birdie King 3 | — | 1984 | Taito | Sports | 2 | |
| Birdie Try | — | 1988 | Data East | Sports | | |
| Birdiy | — | 1983 | Mama Top Corporation | Platformer | 2 | |
| Bishi Bashi Championship Mini Game Senshuken | — | 1996 | Konami | | | |
| Bishou Jan | — | 1999 | Subsino | | | |
| Bishoujo Janshi Pretty Sailor 18-Kin | — | 1994 | Sphinx | Mahjong video game | 2 | |
| Bishoujo Janshi Pretty Sailor 2: H na Sasayaki | — | 1994 | Sphinx | Mahjong video game | 2 | |
| Black Heart | — | 1991 | UPL | Scrolling shooter | 2 | |
| Black Hole (Tokyo Denshi Sekkei) | — | 1981 | Tokyo Denshi Sekkei | | | |
| Black Jack (Status Games) | — | 1985 | Status Games | Card video game | | |
| Black Panther | — | 1987 | Konami | Action | 2 | |
| Black Tiger ^{US} | Black Dragon ^{JP} | 1987 | Capcom | Platformer | 2 | |
| Black Touch | — | 1993 | Seo Gang | Mahjong video game | 2 | |
| Black Touch '96 | — | 1996 | DGRM | Mahjong video game | 2 | |
| Black Widow | — | 1982 | Atari | Multi-directional shooter | 2 | |
| Blade Master | Cross Blades | 1991 | Irem | Hack And Slash | 2 | |
| Blade Strangers | — | 2018 | Nicalis | Fighting | 2 | |
| Blades of Steel | — | 1987 | Konami | Sports | 2 | |
| Blandia | — | 1992 | Taito | Fighting | 2 | |
| Blast Off | — | 1989 | Namco | Scrolling shooter | 2 | Namco System 1 |
| Blastaball | — | 1988 | Arcadia Systems | Action | 2 | Arcadia |
| Blasted | — | 1988 | Bally Midway | | 2 | |
| Blaster | — | 1983 | Williams | Shooter | 2 | |
| Blasteroids | — | 1987 | Atari Games | Multi-directional shooter | 2 | |
| Blasto | — | 1978 | Gremlin Industries | | | |
| BlaZeon | — | 1992 | Atlus | Scrolling shooter | 2 | |
| Blazer | — | 1987 | Namco | Isometric shooter | 2 | Namco System 1 |
| Blazing Lazers | — | 1989 | Hudson Soft | Scrolling shooter | 2 | |
| Blazing Star | — | 1998 | SNK | Scrolling shooter | 2 | |
| Blazing Tornado | — | 1994 | Human Entertainment | | | |
| Block Block | — | 1991 | Capcom | Breakout | | |
| Block Carnival | — | 1992 | Visco | Breakout | | |
| Block Fever | — | 1978 | Nintendo | Breakout | | |
| Block Gal | — | 1987 | Sega/ Vic Tokai | | | |
| Block Hole | Quarth ^{JP} | 1989 | Konami | Puzzle | 2 | |
| The Block Kuzushi | — | 2000 | D3 Publisher | | | |
| Block People | Brick People | 2009 | Sega | | | |
| Block Pong-Pong | — | 2004 | Sammy | | | |
| BlockBuster (ECI) | Mr. Jong | 1983 | ECI | | | |
| Blockade | — | 1976 | Gremlin Industries | Maze | 2 | |
| Blocken | — | 1994 | KID / Visco | | | |
| Blockout (Technos) | — | 1989 | Technos | Puzzle | 2 | |
| Blockout (Game Revival) | — | 2002 | Game Revival | Puzzle | 2 | |
| Blomby Car | — | 1994 | ABM & Gecas | | | |
| Blood Bros. | — | 1990 | TAD Corporation | | | |
| BloodStorm | — | 1994 | Incredible Technologies / Strata (publisher) | Fighting | 2 | |
| Bloody Roar | Beastorizer ^{JP} Bloody Roar: Hyper Beast Duel ^{EU} | 1997 | 8ing/Raizing | Fighting | 2 | ZN-1 |
| Bloody Roar 2 | Bloody Roar II: The New Breed ^{US}Bloody Roar 2: Bringer of the New Age ^{EU/JP} | 1999 | 8ing/Raizing | Fighting | 2 | ZN-1 |
| Bloody Roar 3 | — | 2000 | 8ing/Raizing | Fighting | 2 | |
| Bloody Wolf | Battle Rangers ^{EU} Narazumo Sentou Butai: Bloody Wolf ^{JP} | 1988 | Data East | Run and gun | | |
| Bloxeed | — | 1989 | Sega | Puzzle | 2 | |
| Blue Hawk | — | 1993 | Dooyong | Scrolling shooter | 2 | |
| Blue Print | — | 1982 | Zilec | | 2 | |
| Blue Shark | — | 1978 | Taito | Shooting gallery | | |
| Blue's Journey | Raguy ^{JP} | 1991 | Alpha Denshi | Platform game | 1 | NeoGeo |
| BMC Bowling | — | 1994 | BMC | | | |
| BMX Stunts | — | 1985 | Jetsoft | | | |
| BnB Arcade | — | 2003 | Eolith | | | |
| The Boat | — | 1987 | Hit Gun | | | |
| Body Slam | Dump Matsumoto | 1986 | Sega | | | |
| Bogey Manor | — | 1985 | Technōs Japan | | | |
| Boggy '84 | — | 1983 | Kaneko Company | | | |
| Bomb Bee | — | 1979 | Namco | Breakout / Video pinball | 2 | |
| Bomb Jack | — | 1984 | Tecmo | Action | 2 | |
| Bomb Jack Twin | — | 1993 | NMK | Action | 2 | |
| Bomb Kick | — | 1998 | Yun Sung | | | |
| Bombergirl | — | 2018 | Konami | MOBA | 4 (8 online) | |
| Bomberman (Hudson Soft) | Dynablaster ^{EU} Atomic Punk ^{US} | 1991 | Hudson Soft | Maze/Strategy | 1 | |
| Bomber Man World | New Dynablaster - Global Quest ^{EU} Atomic Punk 2/New Atomic Punk - Global Quest | 1992 | Irem | Maze/Strategy | 1-4 | |
| Bomberman: Panic Bomber | — | 1994 | Hudson Soft | Puzzle | | NeoGeo |
| Bonanza | — | 1993 | New Image Technologies | | | |
| Bonanza Bros. | — | 1990 | Sega | | 2 | |
| Bongo | — | 1983 | Jetsoft | | | |
| Bonk's Adventure | Kyukyoku!! PC Genjin^{JP} | 1994 | Kaneko | Platformer | 2 | |
| Bonze Adventure | Jigoku Meguri | 1988 | Taito | Action | 1 | |
| Boogie Wings | The Great Ragtime Show | 1992 | Data East | Scrolling shooter | 2 | |
| Boomer Rang'r | Genesis | 1983 | Data East | Action-Adventure | 2 | |
| Boong-Ga Boong-Ga | — | 2001 | TaffSystem | Action | 1 | |
| Boot Hill | — | 1977 | Midway | Shooter | 2 | |
| Border Down | — | 2003 | Taito | Scrolling shooter | 1 | |
| Borderline | — | 1981 | Sega | | | |
| Borench | — | 1990 | Sega | | | |
| Born to Fight | — | 1989 | Electronic Devices | | | |
| Botanic | — | 1984 | Valadon Automation | | | |
| Bottom of the Ninth | Main Stadium | 1989 | Konami | | | |
| Boulder Dash (Data East) (1984) | — | 1984 | Data East | | | DECO |
| Boulder Dash (Data East) (1990) | — | 1990 | Data East | | | |
| Boulder Dash (Exidy) | — | 1984 | Exidy | | | Exidy Max-A-Flex |
| Bouncing Balls | — | 1991 | Comad | | | |
| The Bounty | — | 1982 | Orca | | | |
| Bounty Hunter | — | 2002 | GCTech | | | |
| Bowl-O-Rama | — | 1991 | P&P Marketing | | | |
| Bowmen | — | 1994 | Ten-Level | | | |
| Boxing Bugs | — | 1981 | Cinematronics | Multi-directional shooter | 2 | |
| Boxing Mania | — | 2001 | Konami | | | |
| Boxy Boy | Souko Ban Deluxe ^{JP} | 1990 | Namco | Puzzle | 2 | |
| Bradley Trainer | — | 1981 | Atari | | | |
| Brain | — | 1986 | | | | |
| Brave Blade | — | 2000 | 8ing/Raizing | | | ZN-1 |
| Brave FireFighters | — | 1999 | Sega | | | |
| Bravoman | Berabow Man | 1988 | Namco | Run and gun | 2 | Namco System 1 |
| Break Ball | — | 1994 | Bell-Fruit | Video Pinball | | |
| Breakers | — | 1996 | Visco | Fighting | 2 | NeoGeo |
| Breakers Revenge | — | 1998 | Visco | Fighting | 2 | NeoGeo |
| Breakout | — | 1976 | Atari | Breakout | 2 | |
| BreakThru | Kyohkoh-Toppa ^{JP} | 1986 | Data East | | | |
| Brick Zone | — | 1992 | SunA Electronics | | | |
| Bristles | — | 1983 | Exidy / First Star Software | | | |
| BriXian | — | 1993 | Cheil Computer System | Puzzle | | |
| Brute Force | — | 1991 | Leland | | | |
| Bubble 2000 | Hot Bubble | 1998 | Tuning | | | |
| Bubble Bobble | — | 1986 | Taito | Platformer | 2 | |
| Bubble Memories | — | 1995 | Taito | Platformer | 2 | |
| Bubble Symphony | Bubble Bobble II^{JP} | 1994 | Taito | Platformer | 2 | |
| Bubbles | — | 1982 | Williams | Action | 2 | |
| Buccaneers | — | 1989 | Duintronic | Action | 2 | |
| Buck Rogers: Planet of Zoom | Zoom 909 | 1982 | Sega | Shooter | 1 | |
| Bucky O'Hare | — | 1992 | Konami | Beat 'em up | 4 | |
| Bug Busters | — | 2001 | Mizi | Shooting gallery | 2 | |
| Buggy Boy | Speed Buggy | 1985 | Tatsumi | Racing | 2 | |
| Buggy Challenge | — | 1984 | Taito | Driving | 1 | |
| Bull Fight | The Tougyuu | 1984 | Sega | | 2 | |
| Bull Fighter | — | 1984 | Alpha Denshi | Sports | 2 | |
| Bullet | — | 1987 | Sega | Multi-directional shooter | 1 | |
| Bullet Mark | — | 1975 | Sega | | | |
| Bulls Eye Darts | — | 1985 | Magic Electronics | Sports | 1 | |
| Bump 'n' Jump | Burnin' Rubber ^{JP} | 1982 | Data East | Racing | 2 | |
| BurgerTime | Hamburger | 1982 | Data East | Action | 2 | |
| Burglar X | — | 1997 | Unico Electronics | Maze | 2 | |
| Buriki One: World Grapple Tournament '99 in Tokyo | — | 1999 | SNK | Fighting | 2 | Hyper NeoGeo 64 |
| The Burning Cavern | — | 1987 | EFO SA | | | |
| Burning Fight | — | 1991 | SNK | Beat 'em up | 2 | NeoGeo |
| Burning Force | — | 1989 | Namco | Rail shooter | 2 | |
| Burning Rival | — | 1993 | Sega | Fighting | 2 | Sega System 32 |
| Burning Striker | — | 2003 | Eolith | Sports | 2 | |
| Bust-A-Groove 2 - Dance Tengoku Mix | — | 1999 | Metro | Music video game | 2 | |
| Buster Bros. ^{US} | Pang ^{World} Pomping World ^{JP} | 1989 | Capcom | Puzzle | 2 | |
| Butasan | — | 1987 | Jaleco | Sports | 2 | |
