= Blood Warrior =

1994 video game

- European arcade flyer of Blood Warrior
- Developer: Atop
- Publisher: Kaneko
- Composer: Tatsuya Watanabe
- Platform: Arcade
- Release: July 1994
- Genre: Fighting
- Modes: Single-player, multiplayer
- Arcade system: Kaneko AX System

Blood Warrior, known in Japan as Ooedo Fight (大江戸ファイト, Ooedo Faito), is a 1994 fighting video game developed by Atop and published by Kaneko for arcades. It is the successor to the 1992 fighting arcade game, Shogun Warriors, also developed by Atop and published by Kaneko. Unlike Shogun Warriors, Blood Warrior uses digitized images of real actors within the game instead of traditionally drawn sprites, and its addition of blood and gore draws similarities to Midway's Mortal Kombat franchise.

== Characters ==
There are nine playable characters. Like its predecessor, the Japanese version contains original voice samples, while the North American and Worldwide versions were dubbed in English for some characters.

Screenshot of Blood Warrior

- Kinshirō (金四郎) - based on Samurai from Shogun Warriors.
- Arashi (嵐 ("storm")) - based on Ninja from Shogun Warriors.
- Ikkyu (一休) - a ksitigarbha.
- Kasumi (霞 ("haze")) - a kunoichi.
- Sanpei (三平) - a kappa.
- Syogethu (秀月), also known as Shigerutsuki - resembles Shogun from Shogun Warriors, but his actual occupation is a samurai.
- Shishimaru (獅子丸) - based on Kabuki from Shogun Warriors.
- Benkei (弁慶) - based on Saitō Musashibō Benkei, but has a different look compared to himself in Shogun Warriors.
- Goemon (五右衛門) - based on Ishikawa Goemon.

== Reception ==
In Japan, Game Machine listed Blood Warrior on their September 1, 1994 issue as being the seventeenth most-successful table arcade unit of the month.

== See also ==
- The Kung-Fu Master Jackie Chan - another Mortal Kombat-inspired fighting arcade game released by Kaneko.
