= Kangzhou =

Kangzhou (Chinese: 康州) may refer to:

- Kangzhou (Northern Zhou), the namesake of what is today Kang County, Gansu
- Kangzhou (Tang dynasty), a Tang dynasty administrative division of Lingnan, located in what is today Guangdong province

== See also ==
- Ganzhou, a city in Jiangxi province
- Kanchou (disambiguation)
- Kangchu system
