= Shogun Warriors =

Shogun Warriors may refer to:

- Shogun Warriors (toys), a line of toy robots
- Shogun Warriors (comics), a Marvel Comics series based on the toys
- Shogun Warriors (video game), a fighting game by Kaneko, prequel to Blood Warrior
