= Battle Cross =

Battle Cross may refer to:

- Battle Cross (1982 video game), an arcade game
- Battle Cross (1994 video game), a video game for the Super Famicom system
- Battle Cross, Boroughbridge, a monument in North Yorkshire in England
- The Fallen Soldier Battle Cross, an award given for military service
- Battlecross, an American heavy metal music group
