= Power Move =

A power move is a type of breakdancing move.

Power Move may refer to:

- Power Move (album), a 2009 album by Screaming Females
- Power Move Pro Wrestling, a 1995 video game
- Power Moves, a 1992 video game
- Power Moves: The Table, a 1998 album by SPM
