= Ganzhou (disambiguation) =

Ganzhou or Kanchow is a city in Jiangxi, China.

Ganzhou or Kanchow may also refer to:

- Ganzhou, Zhangye, Gansu, China
  - Zhangye, a prefecture-level city
- Ganzhou Uyghur Kingdom

== See also ==
- Kanchō, a prank
