= Air Buster =

1990 video game

- Japanese arcade flyer
- Developer: Kaneko
- Publishers: JP: Namco; NA: Sharp Image Electronics
- Designer: Satoshi Igarashi
- Platforms: Arcade, TurboGrafx-16, Sega Genesis
- Release: Arcade: JP: January 1990; NA: April 1990; TurboGrafx-16: JP: November 2, 1990; NA: January 1991; Genesis: JP: January 31, 1991; NA: February 1991
- Genre: Scrolling shooter
- Modes: Single-player, multiplayer

Air Buster (Note: Japanese: エアバスター, Hepburn: Ea Basutā) is a 1990 horizontally scrolling shooter arcade video game developed by Kaneko. It was published by Namco in Japan and Sharp Image Electronics in North America (licensed from Namco). Two players control the "Blaster Fighter" star ships in their efforts to destroy a mysterious mechanical fortress orbiting Earth, with plans to take control of the planet. The Blaster Fighters can equip one of seven available weapons, which will change the ship's firepower and abilities, such as diagonal shots, homing missiles and small drones that follow the player's ship.

Air Buster received a favorable reception for its visuals, sound effects and gameplay, although complaints were directed at the difficulty, which was deemed "too easy" by numerous publications. Ports of the game were released for both the TurboGrafx-16 and Sega Genesis, the former being renamed to Aero Blasters for international releases. The Sega Genesis release was ported over to the "Project EGG" digital storefront in 2014, which remained exclusive to Japan. A version for the X68000 was in development but never released.

== Gameplay ==
The player fighting an enemy in the game's first stage.

Air Buster is a horizontally scrolling shooter game. Players choose between one of the two Blaster fighters through six scrolling stages. The Blaster fighters can equip one of seven weapons. The weapons include the Striker weapon which adds additional firepower through vertically aligned Options, the Reverse shot which fires two diagonal shots from the rear of the ship, the Six Way Shot which fires semi-automatic shots in six directions and the Homing Shot which tracks enemies all around the screen.

The other three weapons are Missile-based which vary from Red straight-firing Rockets and Green Homing Missiles. There is also the Border item which surrounds the front of the ship, keeping it from crashing into foreground objects. The only other Items include Power-Ups which increase the ship's standard shot power and Bonus Points that appear in the sign of Dollar signs.

== Development and release ==
The Mega Drive/Genesis port runs fullscreen, features more detailed graphics, keeps most of the Arcade version's parallax effects and has better sound effects. The PC Engine/TurboGrafx-16 port features a slightly expanded ending and has a unique track on stage 2.

== Reception ==
Reception

Review scores
| Publication | Score |
|---|---|
| Beep! MegaDrive | 29/40 |
| Electronic Gaming Monthly | 7/10, 9/10, 9/10, 9/10 |
| Mean Machines Sega | 80% |
| Sinclair User | 6/10 |
| Tilt | 18/20 |
| Mega | 85% |

In Japan, Game Machine listed Air Buster as the third most popular arcade game of February 1990.

MegaTech magazine gave the game 78%, commenting on the "excellent graphics, sound and playability", but criticizing the low challenge factor. Mega placed the game at #13 in their Top Mega Drive Games of All Time. Mean Machines gave the game 80%, but said that it could not compete with Hellfire.
