= Heavy Unit =

1988 video game

- Developer: Kaneko
- Publisher: Taito
- Platforms: Arcade, PC Engine, Genesis
- Release: JP: 1988; NA: 1988
- Genre: Scrolling shooter
- Modes: Single-player, multiplayer

Heavy Unit (ヘビーユニット, Hebii Yunitto) is a horizontally scrolling shooter arcade video game developed by Kaneko and published by Taito in 1988. A version for the PC Engine was released on December 22, 1989. There was also a Mega Drive conversion by Toho entitled "Heavy Unit: Mega Drive Special" released on December 26, 1990. The player takes control of a star ship that can transform into a mecha by obtaining a specific type of power up.

== Plot ==
Set in 2013, humankind's first artificial star and planet, "Le Tau", is under attack from genetically modified alien monsters. The player must navigate a "Heavy Unit", a heavily armed, transforming mecha, in order to defeat the onslaught and protect the human colony.

== Gameplay ==
The player's ship had two forms: a space-ship and a giant robot. Players started controlling the Heavy Unit in its space-ship form as default. As they progressed, they could change the ship into its robot form, thus changing its firing mode and mobility. A checkpoint was active however and the Heavy Unit only had one hit. Power ups are dropped by a specific enemy ship which appears in fixed points during the levels. Every level of the game contains a mid-boss and a final boss. Both the ship and the robot modes use two fire buttons, one for the primary (frontal) fire and one for auxiliary fire. The ship mode uses a frontal laser gun which becomes a spread gun with the power ups, plus missiles which drop like bombs as auxiliary fire. The robot mode has a frontal laser gun which increases in power with the power ups plus homing missiles as auxiliary fire. Hidden bonuses (usually 1UPs) can be revealed by shooting certain parts of the scenario or by continuously hitting certain indestructible enemies. There is at least one hidden bonus in every level of the game.

=== Items ===
S - Speed Up: This increased player speed with no limit to how many they could collect.

P - Power Booster: This would increase the player's firepower and could be collected three times before being fully powered up.

B - Shield Unit: This granted the player a shield that could take three hits before dissipating.

T - Transformer: This allowed the ship to transform into its robot form. Collecting it again would change the robot back to a ship.

E - Extend Player: This granted the player an extra life.

== Reception ==
In Japan, Game Machine listed Heavy Unit on their January 1, 1989 issue as being the fifth most-successful table arcade unit of the month.
