= Pantsing =

Act of pulling down a person's trousers

Pantsing (Note: Also known as depantsing, debagging, dacking, flagging, sharking, and scanting.) is the act of pulling down a person's trousers and sometimes underpants, typically as a practical joke or a form of bullying.

Pantsing is a more common prank and occurs mainly in schools. Some U.S. colleges before World War II were the scenes of large-scale "depantsing" scraps between freshman and sophomore males, often involving more than 2,000 participants. It is also an initiation rite in fraternities and seminaries. It was cited in 1971 by Gail Sheehy as a form of assault against grade school girls, which did not commonly get reported, although it might include improper touching and indecent exposure by the perpetrators. In contrast to Sheehy's claim, the U.S. National Library of Medicine analyzed the involvement of boys and girls in pantsing in 2013 and found that boys of various age ranges are the victims of pantsing significantly more often than girls. The United States legal system has prosecuted it as a form of sexual harassment of children, and the NLM found that disciplinary actions taken are typically much harsher when girls are the victims.

== Alternative names ==
In Britain, especially historically at Oxford and Cambridge Universities in England, the term is known as debagging (derived from Oxford bags, a loose-fitting baggy form of trousers). In Northern England, the dialect renders the word "dekekking" or "dekecking" where "keks" is a local word for underwear.

A corresponding term in Australia (aside from pantsing) is dakking, dacking, or daxing, which originated from DAKS Simpson, a clothing brand that became a generic term for pants and underwear. The term double-dacking is used when both the pants and underwear are pulled down. In Scotland the process is often known as breeking or breekexxing from the word breeks meaning 'trousers'. In New Zealand, the act is known as giving someone a down-trou (though this can have a more specific meaning, relating to loser-shaming in pool playing and other competitive games); in Ireland, it is jocking, zoonking or ka-blinking; in the north and south-west of England kegging (or quegging).

An alternative term is sharking, which usually implies a sexual assault on a stranger rather than a prank or bullying between peers, and is sometimes applied more broadly to the pulling down of blouses and other top clothing.

Another prank, in which the victim's underpants are yanked upward rather than downward, is called a wedgie.

== Bullying ==
Pantsing can be used as a form of bullying and is technically the crime of simple assault. The practice has been viewed as a form of ritual emasculation. In 2007, British Secretary of State for Education and Skills Alan Johnson, in a speech to the National Association of Schoolmasters Union of Women Teachers, criticized such bullying and criticized YouTube for hosting a movie (since removed) of a teacher being pantsed, saying that such bullying "is causing some [teachers] to consider leaving the profession because of the defamation and humiliation they are forced to suffer" and that "Without the online approval which appeals to the innate insecurities of the bully, such sinister activities would have much less attraction."

Juanita Ross Epp is highly critical of teachers who regard pupils pantsing one another as normal behavior, saying that pantsing makes pupils feel intimidated and uncomfortable and that "normal is not the same as right".

== See also ==
- Kanchō
