= EZ2DJ =

1999 video game

EZ2DJ / EZ2AC / EZ2ON
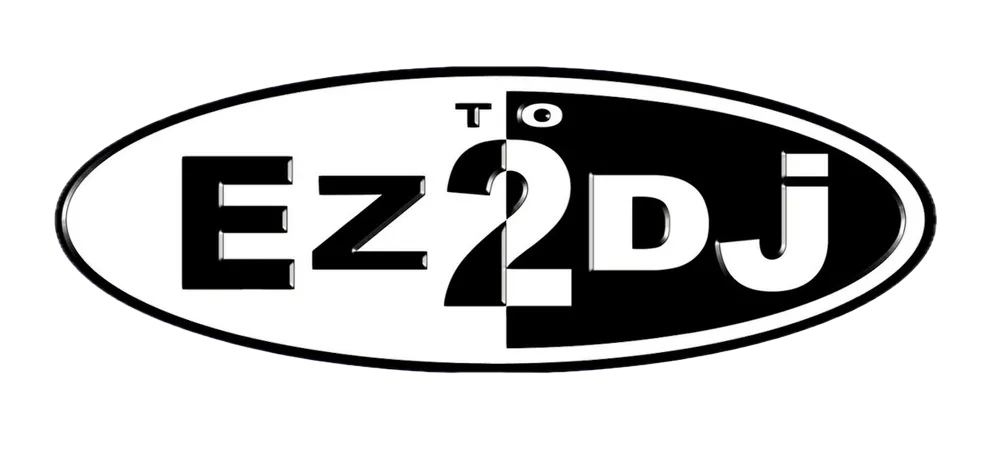
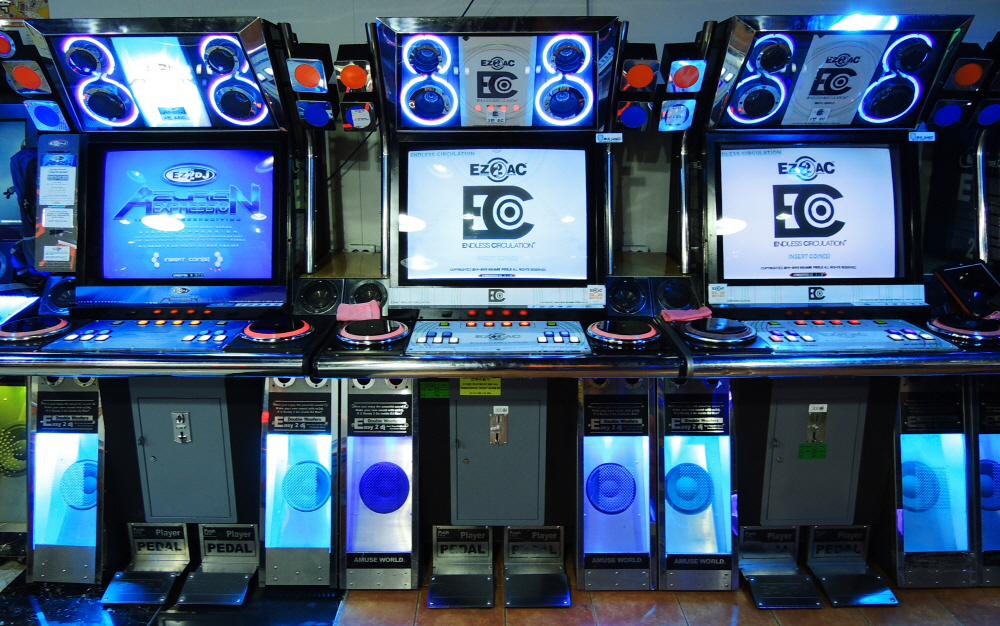
- EZ2AC cabinets
- Developers: Amuse World; Square Pixels
- Publishers: Amuse World; Square Pixels
- Designer: PonGlow
- Platform: Arcade
- Release: SK: 20 April 1999
- Genre: Music
- Modes: Single-player, multiplayer

EZ2DJ (known officially as EZ2AC after 2013, now known as EZ2ON) is a partially-discontinued series of Arcade DJ simulation music video games created by the South Korean company Amuse World. The game is commonly viewed as a Korean-developed counterpart to Konami's Beatmania series, similar to the way Pump It Up emerged as a domestic alternative to Dance Dance Revolution. The game is known for its extreme difficulty, which increased progressively across releases and became a defining characteristic of the series, featuring dense and highly technical note charts, fast tempos, unconventional rhythm patterns, strict timing windows, and a control layout that demands advanced hand coordination, often requiring extensive memorization and many hours of practice even for experienced rhythm-game players.

== History ==
The first edition of EZ2DJ was introduced in 1999 and the last version, EZ2DJ Azure Expression ~Integral Composition~, was released in June 2012. Afterwards, following the lawsuit by Konami, the rights for franchise were given to Square Pixels, and development continued under the title of EZ2AC (AC meaning Arcade), with latest version being EZ2AC Final EX, which was released in August 2020.

The series emerged as a primary competitor to Konami's beatmania, distinguishing itself as a high-difficulty alternative that refined the classic five-key layout. As Konami shifted its focus toward the seven-key beatmania IIDX, a transition some players criticized as overcomplicating hardware controls at the expense of track complexity, portions of the hardcore five-key beatmania community migrated to EZ2DJ. The franchise also found success in international markets where Konami's distribution was limited, establishing a presence in the Middle East in the UAE and Iraq (before 2003) and in other East Asian countries such as China, the Philippines, and Vietnam.

In China, the game developed a long-standing cult following, eventually leading to the opening of specialized venues such as the EZ2DJ Club in Shenyang. These facilities serve as community hubs dedicated to the preservation of legacy hardware and high-level competitive play. In Hong Kong it has been recorded that EZ2DJ players from the city have visited South Korea just to play different versions of the game.

== Hardware and gameplay mechanics ==
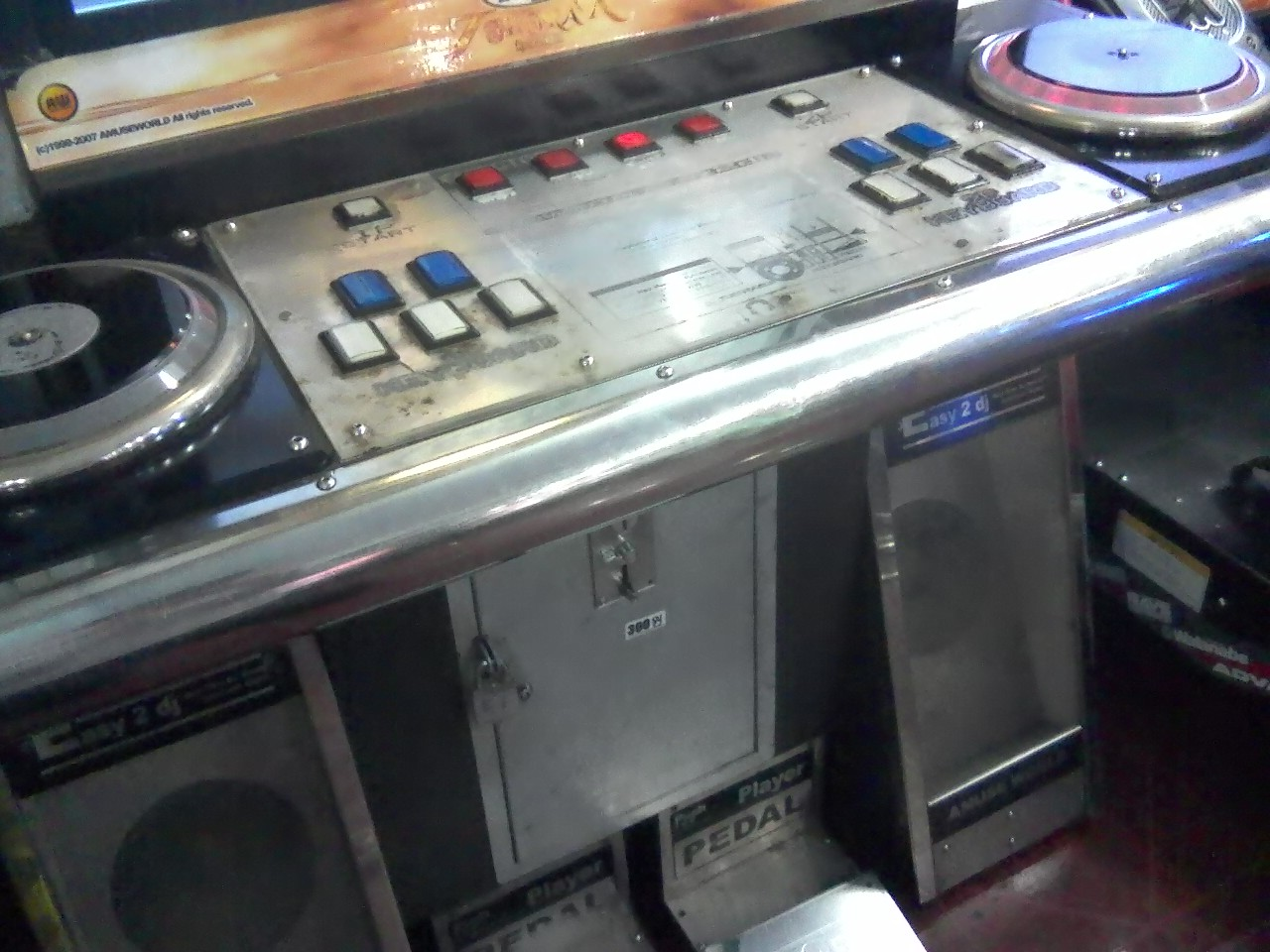
The control panel on a EZ2DJ arcade cabinet

The EZ2DJ series is defined by its specialized hardware interface, designed to replicate the tactile experience of a professional DJ booth through a multi-sensory control scheme. The standard arcade cabinet features a five-key keyboard (arranged in a 2-up, 3-down zigzag pattern suggestive of a piano keyboard), a weighted turntable for rhythmic scratching, and a foot pedal. While the keyboard and turntable manage melodic and percussive "scratch" notes, the foot pedal, a distinctive feature for the genre at the time, requires players to register notes by stepping in time with heavy bass kicks. This setup mirrors a live performer managing multiple pieces of equipment, such as dual decks and mixers, simultaneously.

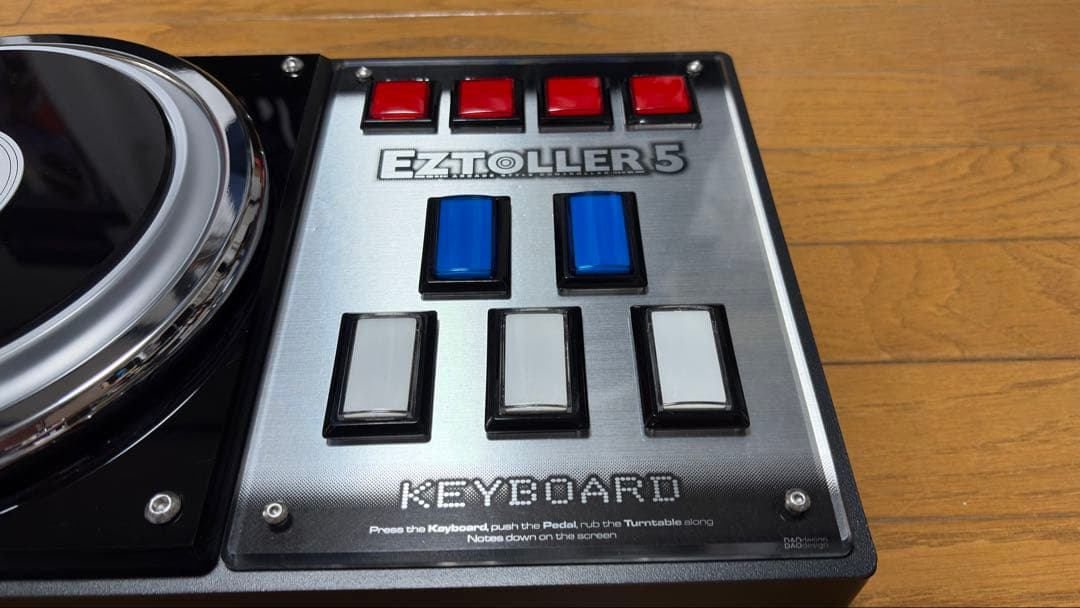
The 5 keys, 2 blue and 3 white serve as the primary input for the game, as the turntable can be switched off in later entries.

EZ2DJ's cabinet features four red effector buttons, located at the top of the controller area. Depending on the game mode, effector buttons are treated as a gameplay buttons, especially in the "Radio Mix" game mode, where each player needs to control two effector buttons. The physical placement of these buttons, arranged in a row at the center of the console panel directly beneath the screen, creates a significant distance from the primary keyboard. This layout increases the physical demand on the player, as they must reach away from the main controls while simultaneously managing the foot pedals. The most complex application of these inputs is found in "Space Mix," which utilizes all four effector buttons in conjunction with all keys and turntables, establishing it as the most difficult mode in the series.

== Audio system ==
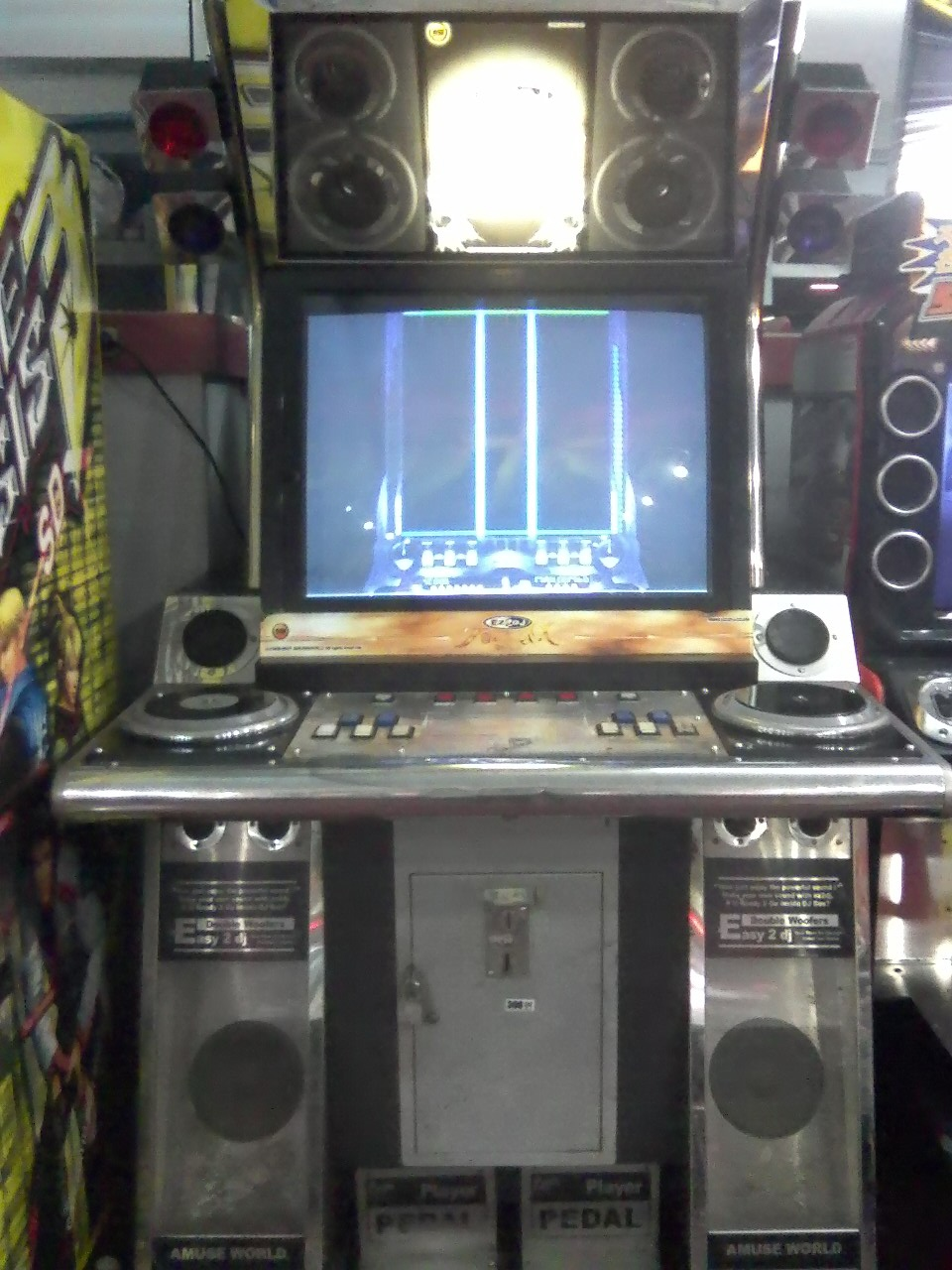
An EZ2DJ 7th TRAX cabinet, showcasing the speaker system

EZ2DJ's cabinet features a total of 10 speakers. There are four mid-range speakers stacked vertically on either side of the screen, and two subwoofers located on the front of the machine. The cabinet also features a pair of headphone jacks, giving players the options to use their own headphones. Using headphones does not disable the external speakers.

== Home play ==
During the 2000s, the EZ2DJ home scene developed through unofficial channels due to the hardware's PC-based architecture. Because the arcade cabinets utilized standard components like the AMD K6-2 and Intel Celeron, players were able to run cracked arcade data on personal computers. While beatmania home play saw a rise in home play through the BMS (Beatoraja/Lunatic Rave 2) format, EZ2DJ lacked a similar open-source simulator ecosystem or official home ports. Consequently, many players adapted other 5-key and turntable controllers for practice, though these required significant modification to match the increased difficulty.

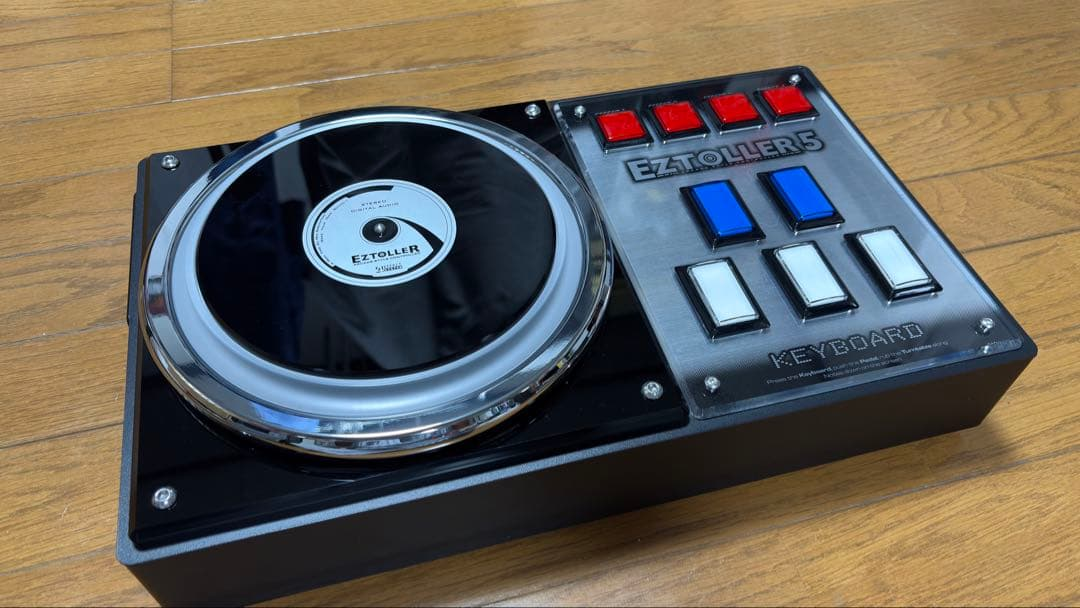
The EZToller5, a modern EZ2DJ home controller made by Chinese company DJ Dao

In the absence of official consumer hardware, a third-party market emerged to provide controllers for the EZ2DJ home community. These devices were developed to replicate the specific mechanical feedback and physical dimensions of the arcade cabinet, which features a five-button layout, four effector buttons, and a weighted turntable. High-end replicas, such as the full-size EZ2DJ Arcade Replica Controller, are built to 1:1 arcade specifications and often include dual turntables to support the game's "Space Mix" (14-key) mode. Additionally, manufacturers like DJ DAO produced smaller-scale alternatives such as the EZTOLLER 5, which utilizes arcade-grade microswitches and Sanwa-style buttons in a compact form factor. These controllers transitioned from being tools for unofficial practice to supported hardware for the franchise's eventual official PC release.

The long-standing unofficial home scene is frequently cited as a factor in the series' transition to a native PC platform. EZ2ON REBOOT : R, developed by SQUARE PIXELS and Neonovice, was released in early access on March 17, 2021, followed by a full release on April 14, 2022. The title functions as a digital archive for the franchise, containing over 250 songs with remastered audio and 16:9 high-definition background videos. Technical features such as NVIDIA Reflex and ASIO support were integrated to reduce input latency, catering to the precision requirements of the existing player base. The game has since expanded through collaborations with other rhythm game franchises, including DJMAX, O2Jam, and Groove Coaster.

== Lawsuit and ruling ==
On July 10, 2007, Konami won a patent infringement suit against AmuseWorld. Konami had originally filed a lawsuit against AmuseWorld in 2001 over the same issue which they settled out of court. It is believed that this settlement was due to the continued release of the title. Following the second trial, a Korean judge's ruling ordered AmuseWorld to pay Konami damages and stop production of the product completely. AmuseWorld paid 11.7 Billion won in satisfaction to Konami.
