= Beatmania III =

2000 video game

beatmania III
- Developer: Konami
- Publisher: Konami (Japan)
- Platform: Arcade(Konami Firebeat)
- Release: JP: March 8, 2000
- Genre: D.J.
- Mode: Up to 2 players simultaneously

beatmania III is a rhythm video game created by Konami. Gameplay is essentially the same as in the beatmania series, with a few enhancements to the hardware.

The beatmania III series was relatively short-lived, spanning only 2 years. It had five releases, the last one being Beatmania III The Final in 2002. In 2016, TCA Regional News reported that the Beatmania III is a rare find, with only five machines available throughout the United States.

== Hardware ==
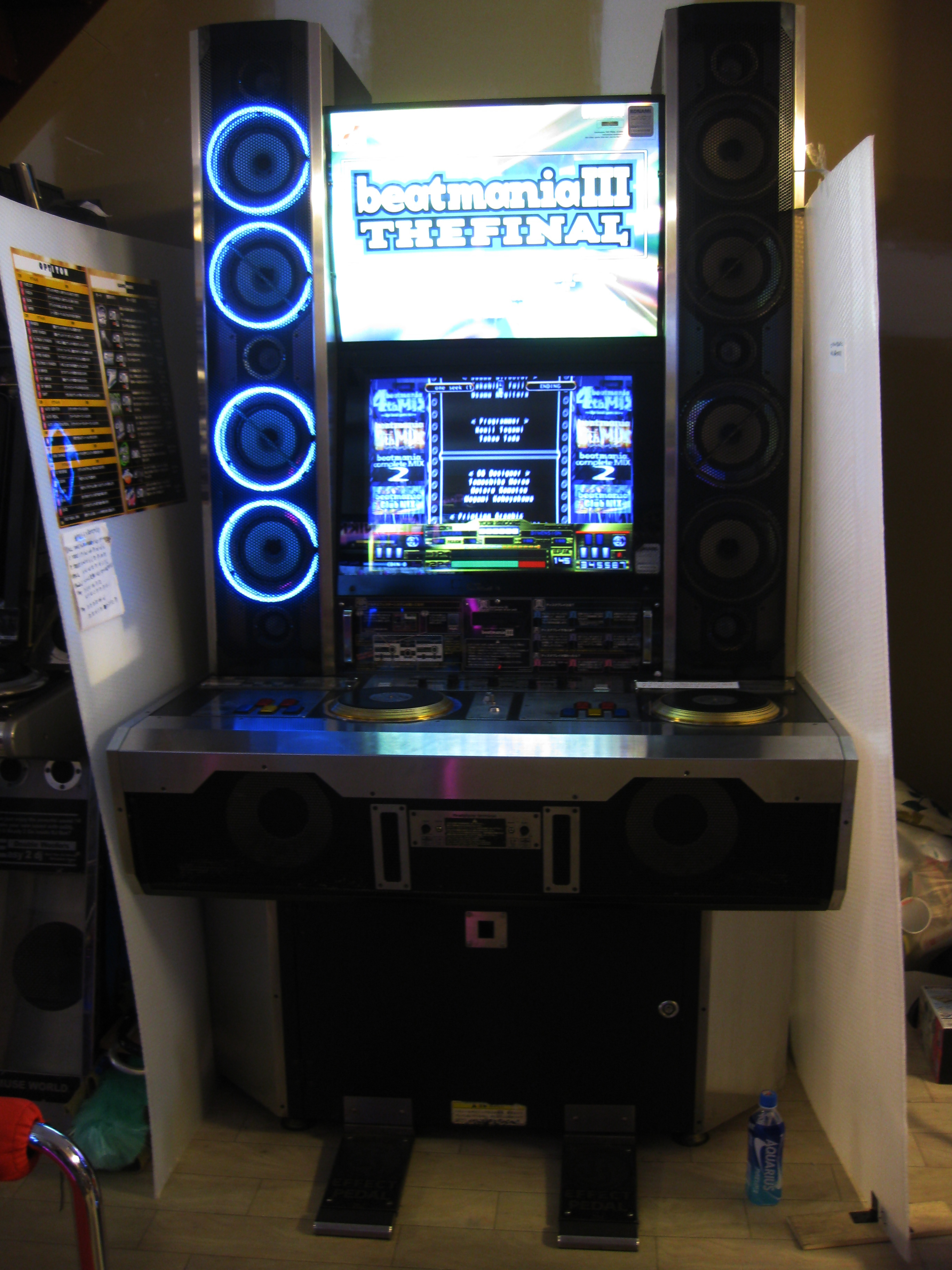
Beatmania III the Final

=== Audio system ===
beatmania III cabinets feature a total of 10 speakers. There are four mid-range speakers stacked vertically on either side of the screen, and two subwoofers located on the front of the machine. The cabinet also features a pair of headphone jacks, so that both players may use their own headphones to enjoy the game's audio. Using headphones does not disable the external speakers.

=== Effector system ===
Whereas the original Beatmania features simply an "Effector" button, beatmania III has an extensive panel for using a number of different effectors. Available effectors vary widely, including Echo, Low Pass, High Pass, Flanger, Phaser, Volume Bass, Lo-Fi, and several others. The chosen effector can be applied to just the background track, just the sounds created by the player, or both, and the intensity of the effect can be adjusted with two parameter knobs. Enabling the effector is achieved by simply pressing the foot pedal.

=== Foot pedal ===
While the original 5-keys-and-turntable layout remains unchanged, beatmania III adds a foot pedal for each player. In normal play, this enables or disables different sound-altering effectors. Some songs have a "foot" version that adds a seventh column with green note bars that is played by using the foot pedal. The game also allows players to set the foot pedal so that it functions as any one of the game's 5 keys.

=== Floppy drive ===
beatmania III has a feature unique to the Bemani series: a 3.5-inch floppy disk drive. By inserting any blank Windows-formatted disk before starting, the player can have the game create files on the disk used to record personal best scores. After playing, the disk is then removed from the drive for later repeated use in beatmania III, or for looking at scores using one's personal computer. The floppy disk was also required to unlock secret songs or game modes on some versions of the game.

== Releases ==
The beatmania III series was only released as an arcade game. No console releases were ever produced even though both Japanese and North American IIDX controllers have input ports for a bass pedal. Each release added songs from the Beatmania games their titles refer to, including most previous arcade releases.

=== Version releases ===
- Beatmania III 1st (March 8, 2000)
- Beatmania III Append Core Remix (December 28, 2000)
- Beatmania III Append 6th Mix (July 13, 2001)
- Beatmania III Append 7th Mix (January 31, 2002)
- Beatmania III The Final (August 26, 2002)

Main series release timeline
2000	Beatmania III 1st
2000	Beatmania III Append Core Remix
2001	Beatmania III Append 6th Mix
2002	Beatmania III Append 7th Mix
2002	Beatmania III The Final
