= Boong-Ga Boong-Ga =

2001 arcade game by Taff System

- A promotional poster for Boong-Ga Boong-Ga
- Developer: Taff System
- Publisher: TaffSystem
- Platform: Arcade
- Release: KR: 2001; JP: 2001
- Genre: Action
- Mode: Single-player

Boong-Ga Boong-Ga (Korean: 붕가 붕가, Japanese: 開ウン！ケダモノ占い), sometimes advertised in English as Spank 'em, is an arcade game developed by a South Korean company, Taff System. It is the first arcade game to simulate kanchō—a popular prank in Japan and Korea where the victim is poked with two fingers in the anus unbeknownst to the victim.

The game received infamy on the internet (where it was often misattributed as Japanese) in 2001 for a badly translated advertising flyer that promoted the game's peculiar spanking and kancho oriented gameplay. Boong-Ga Boong-Ga was reportedly designed for the Japanese market, and according to advertising material, was well received at the 2000 Tokyo Game Show.

While an initial contract was made for distribution of 200 units in Japan, only 5 units were ever actually distributed in the country.

== Overview ==
The object of Boong-Ga Boong-Ga is to score points by spanking or performing kancho on a model of a human posterior embedded in the game's cabinet. A plastic finger is attached to the machine for players to perform the latter.

The game features eight characters players can punish: "Ex girlfriend", "Ex-boyfriend", "gangster", "Mother in law", "Gold-digger", “Prostitute", "Child molester", and "Con-artist". During gameplay, the facial expression of the chosen character is displayed on a monitor.

The game also dispenses cards that rate players on their "sexual behavior", and for players who perform exceptionally well the machine will dispense a small plastic trophy in the shape of a pile of feces.

== See also ==
- Kusoge
