= Shogun Warriors (video game) =

1992 video game

- USA arcade flyer of Shogun Warriors. Despite the name change, the Japanese title Fujisan Buster can still be seen on the arcade flyer.
- Developers: Kaneko; Atop
- Publishers: Sammy (JPN); Kaneko (NA and EUR)
- Composers: Tatsuya Watanabe; Yasushi Wada; Phil Nicholas; Andrew Miller; Neal Shelton; Aaron Briggs; Dane Jefferies
- Platform: Arcade
- Release: September 22, 1992 (JP); October 1992 (US)
- Genre: 2D versus fighting
- Mode: Up to 2 players simultaneously

Shogun Warriors, known in Japan as Fujisan Buster (富士山バスター, lit. "Mount Fuji Buster"), is a 1992 fighting arcade game developed by Atop and released in North America and Europe by Kaneko, published in Japan by Sammy Corporation. It was the first modern-fighting game based on ancient Japanese mythology (later popularized by SNK's Samurai Shodown and The Last Blade series), and was created during the fighting game trend of the 1990s that began with Capcom's Street Fighter II. Shogun Warriors was followed by a 1994 sequel titled Blood Warrior.

== Gameplay ==
Shogun Warriors plays similarly to some other 2D versus fighting games during its release, which the player's character fights against his or her opponent in best two-out-of-three matches in a single player tournament mode with the computer or against another human player. It is controlled with an 8-way joystick and 4 buttons that perform weak and strong versions of punches and kicks. In one player mode, after selecting a character, the arcade randomly selects an opponent. The opponent order goes randomly and always leaves the last four bosses in a certain order. Some characters stabbed by ones armed with katanas or other sharp weapons can cause blood to spurt out, which became popularized a few months later by Midway's Mortal Kombat. The main unique feature of Shogun Warriors is its "grabbing system". When the player is grabbed by the opponent, the grabber must move the joystick left and right to make it more difficult for his opponent to escape, while the one being grabbed must rapidly press any or all buttons to make it easier to escape.

== Characters ==
There are twelve characters, each with their own fighting style and special techniques based on the ones in Japanese culture. Besides the well-known "Winners Don't Use Drugs" screen being added to the North American version, another regional difference is that the Japanese version Fujiyama Buster contains original voice samples, while the North American and worldwide versions were dubbed in English for some characters.

- Samurai (侍) - his appearance, quotes and actions are based on Tōyama no Kin-san, but also have the Shimazu clan's "cross in circle" wind crest on his uniform. His Japanese voice samples were replaced with sound effects in the English versions.
- Kappa (かっぱ) - he has the ability to extend his limbs for performing long-range basic moves. He is also the only non-human character in the game.
- Sabu (さぶ) - based on ancient Japanese firemen. His Japanese voice samples were later dubbed with completely different English words in the English versions.
- Ninja (忍者) - although his true face is revealed in his motif, he wears a mask when fighting.
- Kabuki (歌舞伎) - while his look fully matches his occupation when fighting, his motif shows that he has fangs like a demon.
- Sumo (相撲) - his chonmage is untied and he wears an ornamental apron labeled as "gold" (金).
- Geisya (芸者) - the only female character in the game. One of her moves is a fast-paced, one-leg spinning move.
- Shogun (将軍) - although he has armor, and his motif proves that he is actually a robot, he can still bleed when attacked by blades.

=== Bosses ===
- Oni (鬼, lit. "Demon") - the first sub-boss of the game, he has fire-based attacks.
- Tengu (天狗, lit. "heavenly dogs") - the second sub-boss of the game. Like Oni, Tengu's quotes are in English in all versions.
- Benkei (弁慶) - the third and final sub-boss of the game, he is a sōhei who has Saitō Musashibō Benkei as his motif.
- Goemon (五右衛門) - the final boss in the game, his appearance, victory taunts, and motif are based on Ishikawa Goemon.

== Reception ==
In Japan, Game Machine listed Shogun Warriors on their November 1, 1992 issue as being the fifteenth most-successful table arcade unit of the month.
