= The Kung-Fu Master Jackie Chan =

1995 video game

- Arcade flyer
- Developer: Kaneko
- Publisher: Kaneko
- Director: Masahiro Kawakami
- Producer: Jackie Chan
- Composers: Tatsuya Watanabe; Kaoru Yasuda
- Platform: Arcade
- Release: 1995
- Genre: Fighting game
- Modes: Single-player, multiplayer
- Arcade system: Kaneko AX System

The Kung-Fu Master Jackie Chan (カンフーマスター ジャッキー・チェン) is a 1995 fighting arcade game developed and published by Kaneko. It features the Hong Kong celebrity, Jackie Chan, who was also the producer of it, while it also features other actors from some of his films.

During the same year, the game was later updated and retitled as Jackie Chan in Fists of Fire: Jackie Chan Densetsu (ジャッキー・チェン FISTS OF FIRE 成龍伝説, lit. "Jackie Chan in Fists of Fire: Legend of Jackie Chan").

== Gameplay ==
The controls of the game are similar to that of SNK's earlier installments in their Fatal Fury series (particularly Fatal Fury 2, Special and 3), as well as The King of Fighters franchise. The special actions are also similar to other fighting games from the same era. The presentation and death moves were most likely influenced by that of the success of Midway's Mortal Kombat franchise, though not the first in the genre.

The player's character fights against his or her opponent in a standard one-on-one best two-of-three format like most fighting games, but a match can last up to five rounds if there is no clear-cut winner in previous rounds (the game will end if both fighters lose the fifth round and no bonus points will be awarded if one wins the fifth round). Players have a character roster of six characters to choose from at the start, each with their own fighting style and special techniques. In one-player mode, after selecting a character, the arcade randomly selects an opponent. After two opponents are knocked out, one out of three versions of Jackie Chan becomes the next opponent. Unlike the Mortal Kombat series, some powerful finishing moves lack blood and gore, and some do not destroy the opponents. The fast-paced action and zooming view are similar to that of numerous Neo Geo fighting games.

=== Jackie Chan in Fists of Fire: Jackie Chan Densetsu ===
Jackie Chan in Fists of Fire: Jackie Chan Densetsu is an updated version of The Kung-Fu Master Jackie Chan that was also released the same year exclusively for the arcades, and was the very last fighting game Kaneko released before their bankruptcy in 2006. It adds a desperation move system, an improved combo system with a special combo counter above the life bars that records the highest number of combos during a match, and an "escaping" feature where players can struggle out of combos or stand up as fast as possible by rapidly moving the control stick and tapping the buttons simultaneously. Fists of Fire also makes all three versions of Jackie Chan into playable characters expanding the roster up to nine playable characters, and makes adjustments to the character balance by strengthening and weakening the statistics of certain playable characters from the first game, while adding and removing a few moves to some of them. The palettes of Lau, Yeung and Thorston were heavily modified as well. The opening intro is a modified version of the first game's intro, but the rest of the game's graphics are not that different.

== Characters ==
There are six playable fighters to choose from in The Kung-Fu Master Jackie Chan, and nine in Jackie Chan in Fists of Fire.

- Lau (ロウ) (actor: Vincent Lau Tak) - known for his appearance in the Sammo Hung film How to Meet the Lucky Stars (as Leung). In this game, he uses karate. He was later altered in the Fists of Fire update as Dark Lau.
- Yeung (ヤン) (actor: Yeung Ching-Ching) - known for her appearance in many Shaw Brothers films including Clan of the White Lotus (as herself), The Eight Diagram Pole Fighter (as Yang No. 9) and Treasure Hunters (as Jue Gow). In this game, she uses bōjutsu. She was later altered in the Fists of Fire update as Shadow Yeung.
- Sam (サム) (actor: Sam Wong / Ming-Sing Wong) - known for being one of the former leaders of the well-known Jackie Chan Stunt Team. In this game, he uses kung-fu. He was later altered in the Fists of Fire update as Black Sam.
- Thorsten (トステン) (actor: Thorston Nickel) - known for his appearance in Thunderbolt (as Cougar). In this game, he uses traditional martial arts. He was later altered in the Fists of Fire update as Demon Thorsten.
- Kim-Maree (キム マリー) (actor: Kim-Maree Penn) - known for her appearance in Police Story 3: Supercop as Blonde Gunwoman (uncredited). In this game, she uses professional wrestling. She was later altered in the Fists of Fire update as Dirty Maree.
- Mysterious Lion (ミステリアス ライオン) (actor: Sam Wong / Ming-Sing Wong) - the only original character in the game. In this game, he uses magic. He was later altered in the Fists of Fire update as Evil Lion.

=== Bosses ===
After two opponents have been knocked out, players face Jackie Chan as he uses three different fighting styles in order of appearance. He is unplayable in the original version, but playable in the Fists of Fire update. Known to be protective of his image, the three variations of Chan cannot be defeated with a finishing move, nor can they finish their opponents, and give the player a thumbs up if they lose a round.

- Five Animal Fist (五形拳) (Yellow) - this version of him appears as the first boss. The fighting style he uses in the game was used in one of his earliest films, Spiritual Kung Fu.
- Zui Quan (酔拳, lit. "drunken fist") (Violet) - this version of him appears as the second boss, and is based on his appearance in Drunken Master and its sequel, Drunken Master II.
- Baguazhang (八卦掌, lit. "eight trigram palm") (White) - this version of him appears as the third and final boss. He is dressed in his ceremonial suit from Project A.

== Development ==
While Jackie Chan started the production of his then-newest film Thunderbolt in late 1994, Golden Harvest decided to film in Japan for its several racing and fight scenes. As the film crew traveled to Japan they began a search for sponsors to fund the film, and as they were searching, the video game developer Kaneko was found. While Kaneko agreed to sponsor the film, they penned a mutual deal to create a Jackie Chan-based fighting game. The deal was negotiated by Chan's longtime friend and accomplice Frankie Chan, who also co-produced the game. Due to the timing and relationship between filming Thunderbolt in Japan and signing the fighting game deal, Kaneko brought Jackie Chan and some of his actors and stuntmen of Thunderbolt such as Sam Wong and Thorsten Nickel to the offices in Tokyo in order to start the motion capture work in order to convert them into playable characters. Most of the capturing work took place in Hong Kong during Thunderbolt's production period there. Kaneko's company logo is prominently displayed throughout Thunderbolt.

In an interview with journalist Audun Sorlie, actor Thorsten Nickel shed light on the production and launch of the game, which was given a press conference in Sendai where Nickel and Chan were on-hand to give interviews to speak about the experiences of working with motion capture, and to perform a short fight scene demonstration which they hastily choreographed the day prior. During the conference they also revealed details about the then-upcoming Thunderbolt film.

== Reception ==
In Japan, Game Machine listed The Kung-Fu Master Jackie Chan on their July 15, 1995 issue as being the fourteenth most-successful arcade game of the month.

Computer and Video Games criticized the graphics in Fists of Fire calling them "unclean" and "grain-laden" and that the game seemed like a "waste of a good license".
