= Kanchō =

East Asian prank involving poking targets in the rear

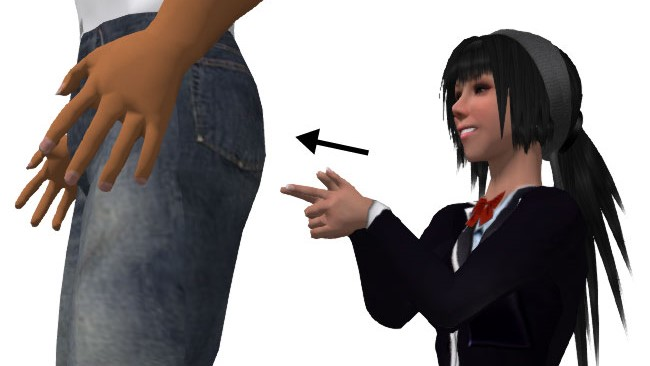
Illustration of how kanchō is performed

Kanchō (カンチョー; pronounced [kaɲtɕoː]) is a prank performed by clasping the hands together in the shape of a finger gun and poking the anus of an unsuspecting person, often while exclaiming "Kan-cho!" It is a common prank in East Asian countries such as Japan. In Korea, it is called ttongchim (똥침; 똥針, pronounced [t͈oŋ.tɕʰim]), and in China, qiānnián shā (千年殺, "thousand-year kill" or "immortal kill") (Note: From an exclaiming in Japanese manga series Naruto: 千年殺し！ Sennen'goroshi!.). The word "kanchō" is a slang adoption of the Japanese word for enema (浣腸, kanchō). In accordance with widespread practice, the word is generally written in katakana when used in its slang sense and in kanji when used for enemas in the medical sense.

In English-speaking countries, the term "goosing" generally refers to a comparatively mild poke, prod, or pinch on or between the buttocks with the tips of the fingers and thumb, in imitation of a harmless bite on the butt from a goose. This does not typically involve direct contact with or penetration of the anus. However, the kanchō prank may also be informally known as "goosing" in some contexts.

Unlike traditional goosing, kanchō involves directly targeting the anus, which means that performing it without consent in jurisdictions such as the United States could constitute assault, battery, or sexual assault/battery, depending on factors such as the victim's age, the circumstances, intent, and local laws. This may lead to criminal charges, fines, school discipline, or other consequences.

== Popular culture ==
Kanchō is present in the form of the "One Thousand Years of Death" technique in the Shōnen Jump series Naruto, along with its anime adaptation of the same name.

== See also ==
- Boong-Ga Boong-Ga – video game which allows the player to engage in simulated kanchō
- Pantsing
