= Borench =

1990 puzzle video game

- Arcade flyer
- Developer: Sega
- Publisher: Sega
- Platform: Arcade
- Release: 1990
- Genre: Puzzle
- Modes: Single-player, multiplayer
- Arcade system: Sega System C-2

Borench (ボレンチ, Borenchi) is a 1990 arcade puzzle video game developed and published by Sega.

== Gameplay ==
Borench is played in an isometric perspective, and the player's goal is to roll a ball downwards towards a goal, as the screen scrolls up. If the ball reaches the top of the screen, the game ends.

== Reception ==
British gaming magazine The One reviewed Borench in 1991, calling it a "mild diversion between the regular bouts of alien genocide", and further stating that there are "No adrenaline surges here, but it's worth a few goes if you fancy a [change of pace]."

Amstrad Computer User also reviewed Borench in 1991, similarly stating that "You'll get no adrenaline surges from playing this baby, but it's quirky enough that you might find yourself having just that one more go or three, inbetween games of Alien Genocide."

Japanese gaming magazine Megadrive Fan reviewed Borench in 1990, calling it an "action puzzle game" and stating that it requires "calm and quick judgement" in its gameplay. Megadrive Fan further states that "Using a number of techniques can make a difference to your score. However, if you aim for a high score, the risk of mistakes is usually high" and that Borench's controls "require getting used to". Megadrive Fan compares Borench's "simple and abstract" graphics to Tetris and Columns, and its gameplay to Marble Madness. Megadrive Fan praised Borench's "simple" gameplay, expressing that it is easy to learn, and noted that it rewards differing styles of gameplay with points, stating that Borench's "difficulty varies depending on the playstyle of the player." Megadrive Fan criticises Borench's two-player mode, calling it "unnecessary."
