= Power Athlete =

1992 video game

- Packaging of the Japanese Mega Drive version, titled Power Athlete
- Developer: System Vision
- Publisher: Kaneko
- Composer: Hideki Suzuki
- Platforms: Super NES, Genesis/Mega Drive
- Release: Super NES: JP: November 27, 1992; NA: January 1993; EU: October 1993; Genesis/Mega Drive: JP: December 11, 1992; NA: January 1993
- Genre: Fighting
- Modes: Single-player, multiplayer

Power Athlete (パワーアスリート), known outside Japan for the Sega Genesis as Deadly Moves and for the Super Nintendo Entertainment System as Power Moves, is a 1992 fighting video game developed by System Vision and published by Kaneko.

== Gameplay ==
The gameplay is that of a traditional head-to-head fighting game. But unlike most games of its type, the single-player mode is limited to one character, Joe, who is the protagonist of the game. One of the game's most distinctive aspects is an RPG-like system which enables the player to boost Joe's various attributes, such as strength, speed and endurance. Another gimmick is the use of a two-plane fighting area (similar to that of SNK's Fatal Fury: King of Fighters).

== Characters ==
- (United States) Joe - An American kenpo fighter. The single-player mode follows Joe's journey to become the champion of champions.
- (United States) Warren - A Hawaiian fighter. Warren uses his large size and powerful strikes to compensate for his cowardice.
- (Thailand) Reayon - A Thai martial artist born in China and the only female fighter. Reayon has mastered the flexible-fist method of the northern Chinese fighting style.
- (Russia) Vagnad - A huge Russian wrestler with onyx skin. Vagnad learned to fight while held in a concentration camp.
- (Spain) Nick - A Spanish matador. Nick prefers to use knives when fighting, and is a member of the secret organization "Junk".
- (Japan) Buoh - A Japanese kabuki performer. Buoh is a master of ninjutsu, kung fu, karate, aikido, and kobudō.
- (China) Gaoluon - A Chinese martial artist. Gaoluon has mastered the hard-fist method of the northern Chinese fighting style.
- Baraki - The head of Kenya's Opa Opa Tribe. He is also a member of the secret organization "Junk".
- (United States) Ranker - The American Champion of Champions. Ranker serves as the game's final boss and is only playable via hidden passwords.

== Version differences ==
- Despite the difference in name for the Genesis and Super NES versions, there was no actual difference in gameplay, content or characters. However, it is widely believed that the game's box cover and title were renamed only to keep up with Nintendo's stringent no-violence policy, as the Genesis version features a closeup of a character being punched in the face, with a torrent of blood erupting from the impact. The Super NES version's packaging featured the same image, with the blood re-colored to look like sweat.
- Although the Genesis/Mega Drive version known as Deadly Moves featured a blood-spattered cover, there was no blood nor death moves of any kind in the game.
- The US magazine ad for the game, while detailing its features, did not feature any actual screenshots from the game, but crudely drawn ones that did not resemble the game at all.
