= The Berlin Wall (video game) =

1991 arcade game based on the Berlin Wall

- Arcade flyer (NA)
- Developers: Kaneko; Inter State (Game Gear)
- Publisher: Kaneko
- Platforms: Arcade, Game Gear
- Release: Arcade: 1991; Game Gear: JP: November 29, 1991; NA: Canceled
- Genre: Platform
- Modes: Single-player, multiplayer

The Berlin Wall (released as Berlin no Kabe (ベルリンの壁) in Japan) is a 1–2 player platform game released in arcades by Kaneko in 1991, one year after the official demolition of the actual Berlin Wall began. It is similar to Space Panic. A Game Gear version was released exclusively in Japan; the North American release was cancelled.

The player controls a boy who must use his hammer to break the blocks that form part of the platform levels comprising each stage. These holes act as falling traps for the many patrolling multi-coloured monsters, and once one has fallen into a hole, the player may then use the hammer on the monster to make it fall through the hole and down to the platform below, causing it to transform into fruit or power-ups, which can then be collected and used.

Part of the money earned from sales of the arcade version went towards a relief fund for disaster victims through the Japanese Red Cross Society.
