= Beatmania =

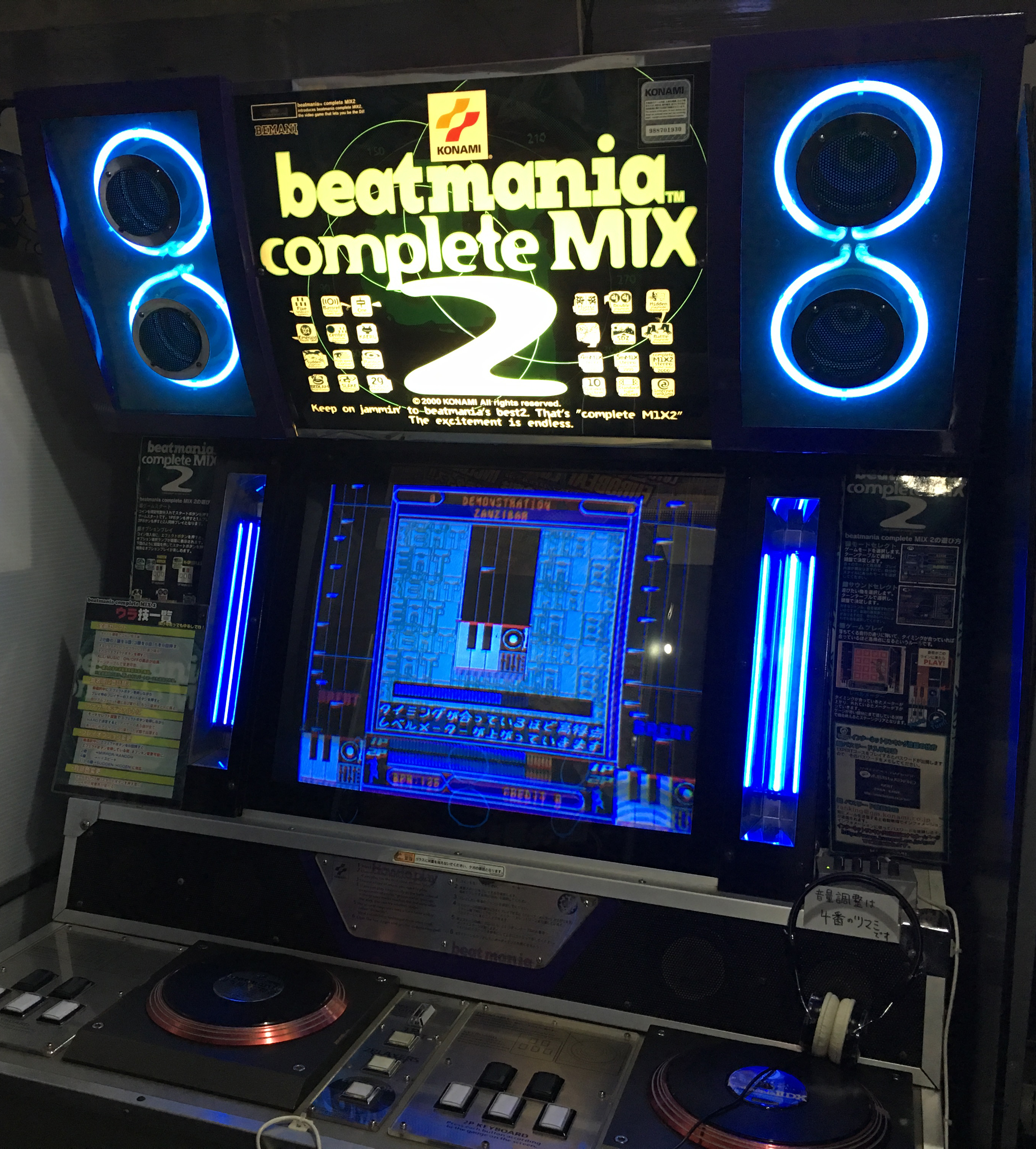
- A Japanese cabinet of beatmania completeMIX 2, released in 2000
- Genre: Music video game
- Developer: Konami G.M.D.
- Publisher: Konami
- Creator: Yuichiro Sagawa
- First release: Beatmania; December 10th, 1997
- Latest release: Beatmania: The Final; July 26, 2002
- Spin-offs: Beatmania IIDX, Beatmania III, other Konami music games

Beatmania (ビートマニア) (styled as beatmania), initially localized as Beatstage or Hiphopmania, is a discontinued series of Arcade DJ simulation music video games developed and distributed by Japanese game developer Konami and first released in December 1997, With every Beatmania game having its own slogan (eg. beatmania IIDX 18 Resort Anthem: Blaze through the resort party!). It contributed largely to the boom of music games in 1998, and the series expanded not only with arcade sequels, but also moved to home consoles and other portable devices, achieving a million unit sales. The Bemani line of music games from Konami is named after the series, was first adopted in the arcade release of Beatmania 3rdMix and kept ever since. The series came to an end with the last game being Beatmania The Final, released in 2002.

In the international market, the series competed with the South Korean-developed EZ2DJ, another 5-key DJ simulation game, which Konami sued for copyright infringement relating to its gameplay similarity to Beatmania.

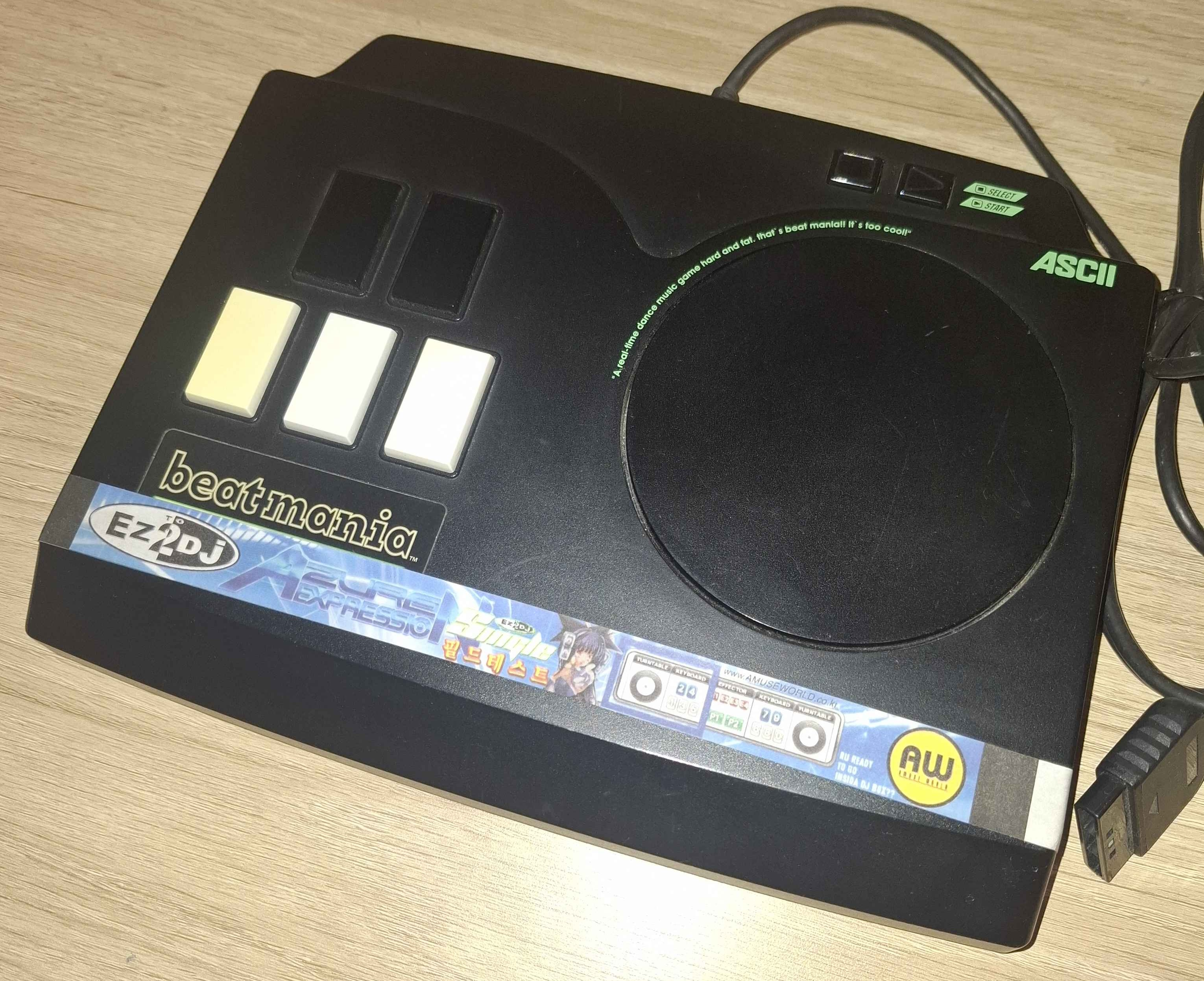
Controller for the PS1 releases of Beatmania, released by ASCII Corporation in 1998

In 1998, ASCII Corporation, the former distributor of Microsoft in Japan, signed an exclusive agreement with Konami to produce third-party controllers for the PlayStation releases of Beatmania. The controllers, known as the ASC-0515BM were often bundled alongside the game. With Konami's official controller for the game, the DJ Station Pro positioned as a more premium option.

Beatmania gave birth to several spinoffs, such as the Beatmania IIDX series (a more advanced version featuring 7 keys and higher difficulty levels, and to this day still receiving new version updates) and the other being Beatmania III, a remake of the 5-key series which featured a more modern hardware platform, a pedal for optional effects and a 3.5" floppy disk drive to save play records.

While the series was never ported to home computers, there have been unlicensed hard-drive copies which made it playable on a computer's keyboard, or even with a modded PlayStation controller. Its popularity led to non-official simulators, with one of the most popular being BM98.

Beatmania and its variants have a following in Japan and all around the world. The password-based Internet Ranking service allowed competition wherever a machine is available. Today in the United States, many of the original Beatmania cabinets are in the hands of arcade collectors and Bemani enthusiasts, and consequently, are a rare sight at many arcades.

== Basic rules ==
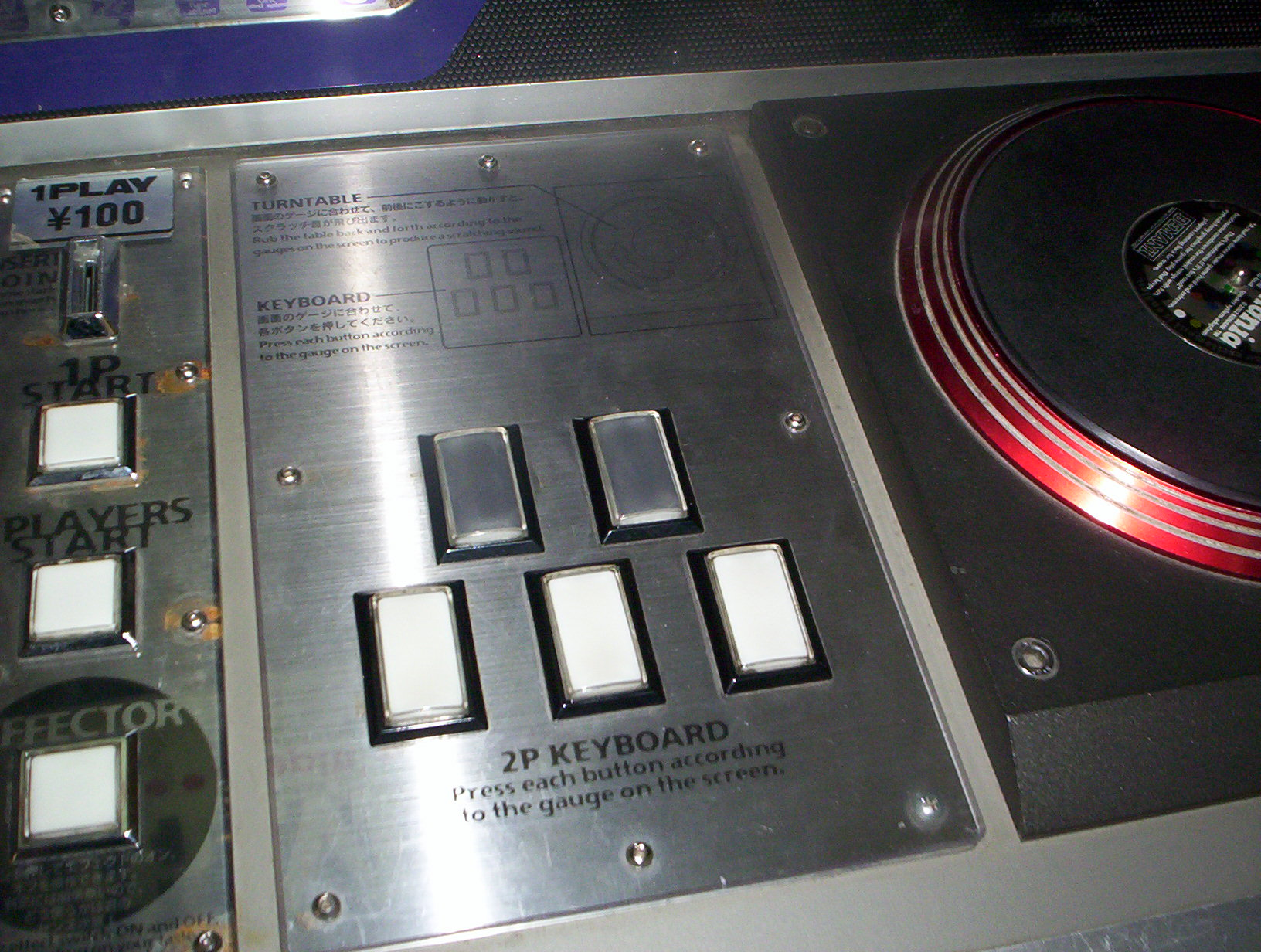
Keyboard and turntable controls for beatmania.

The player is a club DJ who must manipulate the controls according to the instructions on the screen to win the praise of the audience. Each game consists of a set number of songs of various difficulties, and each song must attain a certain degree of satisfaction from the audience to progress to the next.

The game controls consist of five plastic vertical rectangular keys that are arranged in a zigzag pattern like the letter "M" or in vibraphone type arrangement. They resemble the layout of the keys of a piano (e.g., C, C#, D, D#, and E) and are color-coded in the same fashion, with the lower row white and the top row black. A turntable is to the right of the five keys, and is turned, or "scratched".

Each key has a corresponding vertical bar onscreen, as does the turntable. The bars indicate the path that rectangular icons cascade down towards a horizontal line near the bottom of the screen. The player must hit the corresponding key or rotate the turntable when the icon matches the line, which will trigger a preset sound sample and recompose the song properly. Players are judged for each key press for the accuracy of the timing on a scale of p-great (from "perfect great"; also called "flashing great"), great, good, bad, and poor. Hitting keys/scratching when corresponding notes are absent will deplete a bar, indicating satisfaction by the audience. The passing range is shown on the bar as a red region on the right, and green for the failing range on the left. The game may end prematurely if the bar is completely depleted, but this depends on individual machine settings.

The unit of score in the game is "money". A final grade (usually between A – H) is given at the end of the game to indicate the player's performance. This grade is not directly based on the "money score" but is instead based on the player's overall accuracy.

== Game modes ==
Various game modes are available, with different rule alterations that provide suitable challenges for players of various degrees of skill.

Practice
Featured in Beatmania 2ndMix and Beatmania, inexperienced players can go through a training stage with DJ Konami, a voice-over that walks the player through the basics of the game. After the training stage players can select songs normally and regardless of their performance won't end a game prematurely. The voice over was not featured in any other Beatmania series game, although a similarly formatted Tutorial mode was recently added to the Beatmania IIDX games. Prior to practice mode players could choose to play a practice stage during normal games.

Normal
The regular mode. Players select songs and play normally. A pool of songs is available for every stage, with the next stage pool being more difficult than the last. Clearing is required to get to the next stage.

Free
Introduced in 6thMIX, Free mode is another practice mode that follows all the rules of the Normal mode, with passing and failing scores, but allows the player to play all the predefined number of songs regardless of each song's difficulty.

Expert
A mode for skilled players with courses that predefines the songs to be played. The rules for this mode have been modified throughout different versions of the game.
- Beatmania
  Players must play through all the songs in a set order, with the audience bar dropping in greater degrees and increasing less. All the other rules follow the normal mode. Continues are allowed.
- 2ndMIX
  Different themed course are given, each running five songs long. The scoring rules follow that of the previous beatmania.
- 3rdMIX
  In addition to the courses format of 2ndMIX, the audience bar is now full from the beginning, and any decrease will carry onto the next stage, where good performance does not recover the bar. The audience bar is characteristically colored in red, and no continues are allowed upon game over.
- completeMIX and after
  With the introduction of the Internet Ranking service, scores are now counted as 2 points for "Just Great" and 1 point for "Great", which makes the overall EX Score. Upon completion of the course, a password is given to the player to submit to the official website for worldwide ranking. All of the Internet Ranking services have ended and are no longer available.
- featuring "Dreams Come True"
  The Dreams Come True edition uses the same rules as CompleteMIX, but also features a minigame in between songs where a player can rapidly scratch to restore life.

Expert+
First offered in 6thMIX, this mode is designed for the most skilled of players. A single course is provided, featuring ten of the most difficult songs in a particular version. The audience bar functions similarly to that of Expert mode, but falling to zero doesn't result in an immediate game over. Rather, "Danger" is displayed on the screen, and it will take several subsequent misses to end the game. The bar is restored after each song, though the bar will be increased to just barely over "Danger", should it have been in effect at the end of the song.

Easy
Available since 3rdMIX, the Easy mode offers simplified playing sequences for songs. The selection of Easy and Hard modes were discarded altogether from 6thMIX and after, with difficulty selection becoming options within the integrated Normal mode.

== Cabinet design ==
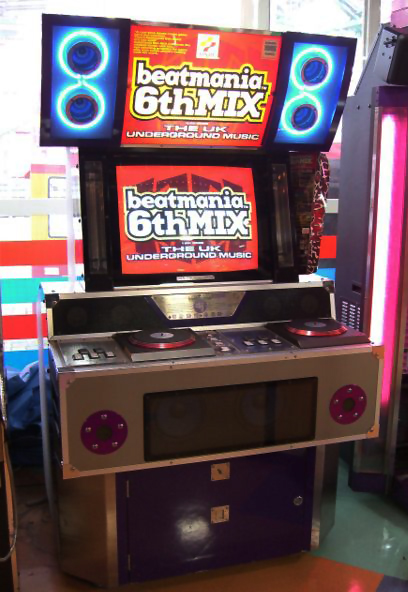
A Beatmania 6th MIX arcade cabinet

Two major styles of the Beatmania cabinet were originally created, the standard cabinet, and the mini-style cabinet. The standard cabinet was taller and wider than the mini-style and included a 29" screen, versus the 20" screen on the mini cabinet. The 1P/2P/Effect buttons were placed on the vertical face of the cabinet on the mini, while placed between the keys, ahead of the coin drop on standard cabinets. The mini-cabinet contained 6 speakers, 4 normal mid/high range, and 2 larger subs. The standard cabinet contained 10 speakers, including the 2 subs. Functionally the game boards, HDD, and ROM chips were the same between cabinets. Finally, the mini cabinet had a smaller spacing between the turntable and the keys, and the turntable was approximately half the diameter of the standard version. Today the mini-cabinet is much more difficult to find, especially in the United States.

== Main artists ==
Beatmania offers many musical genres from different disciplines of electronic music. Below are some of the artists who made frequent appearances in the series.

- dj nagureo/reo nagumo/tiger YAMATO and other aliases
- Mikio Endo
- Hiroshi Watanabe
- Hiroyuki Togo and other aliases
- Naoki Maeda and other aliases
- DJ TAKAWO
- RAM
- TAQ
- BEMANI Sound Team "L.E.D, dj TAKA and TOMOSUKE"

== Releases ==
The Beatmania series has been released on multiple platforms in addition to its arcade releases. The majority of the games are featured on the PlayStation, but other console ports have also been featured on the Game Boy Color, and the WonderSwan.

Several key mixes were never ported to home or portable consoles, including Beatmania 7thMix and Beatmania The Final. There are many console-exclusive songs that were also never introduced in the Arcade releases—those include "GOTTAMIX" and "THE SOUND OF TOKYO!" respectively. Many songs were also released on one mix at the arcades but released in another style for the consumer versions. The best example of this was Gottamix 2, which contained consumer-exclusive songs in addition to the "Complete Mix 2 Anothers" that was released months earlier as an arcade exclusive.

Arcade releases
The main platform for the series, most other releases were based on certain titles from the arcade series or featured a selection of songs across several of them.
The following are arranged in the order of their release.

- Beatmania (December 31, 1997)
- Beatmania 2ndMix (March 18, 1998)
- Beatmania 3rdMix (September 28, 1998)
- Beatmania completeMix (January 19, 1999)
- Beatmania 4thMix -the beat goes on- (April 26, 1999)
- Beatmania 5thMix -Time to get down- (September 22, 1999)
- Beatmania completeMix 2 (January 27, 2000)
- Beatmania Club Mix (March 28, 2000)
- Beatmania featuring Dreams Come True (May 31, 2000)
- Beatmania Core Remix (November 28, 2000)
- Beatmania 6thMix -The UK Underground Musics- (July 11, 2001)
- Beatmania 7thMix -Keepin' Evolution- (January 31, 2002)
- Beatmania The Final (July 26, 2002)

Korean arcade releases

Korean local releases (licensed by Uniana Co., Ltd. (formerly Unico Electronics)) removed Japanese vocal songs due to Korean law at that time.

- Beatstage (1998): Logo is a variation of Beatmania, but is actually 2ndMix. "tokai" is not available in this version.
- Beatstage 3rdMix (1999): "Believe again (Hyper Mega Mix)" and "Luv to me (Third-Mix)" are the English versions from Complete Mix. "Believe Again (80's J-Pop)" and "Find Out (Soul)" are not available in this version.
- Beatstage completeMix (1999): "tokai", "Find Out", "Believe Again 'Hyper Mega Mix' (Japanese Version)", "Believe Again (80's J-Pop)" and "Luv to me (Japanese Version)" are not available in this version.
- Beatstage 4thMix -the beat goes on- (1999): No removed songs in this version.
- Beatstage 5thMix -Time to get down- (2000): The Gauge method is different from Beatmania 5thMix. It is similar to the HARD gauge in the beatmania IIDX series. Added Hi-speed 2/3 (from completeMix2), both "TOTAL RECALL" and "KAKATTEKONKAI" are not available in this version.

North American arcade releases
Konami released three Beatmania games in North America under the name HipHopMania.

- HipHopMania (1997): Includes all songs from the Japanese version.
- HipHopMania complete Mix (1999): Includes all songs from the Japanese version.
- HipHopMania complete Mix 2 (2000): Includes almost all songs from the Japanese version (Removed 10 songs).

Console releases

PlayStation:
The PlayStation releases were only available in Japan apart from one which was created especially for the European market. The first game acted as a key disc, which is required to play the subsequent releases through disc-changing, dubbed as append discs. Special hidden songs could be accessed for certain append discs if the discs were changed through a specific order.

- Beatmania (October 1, 1998): The console release of the arcade 2ndMix. Acts as a key disc.
- Beatmania Append Yebisu Mix: Append disc included with the release of Beatmania containing all-new songs. Features the debut of the popular Bemani artist Sanae Shintani.
- Beatmania Append 3rdMix (December 23, 1998): The first stand-alone append disc to be sold. Features various, but not all, new songs from the arcade 3rdMix in addition to original console tracks. The Expert Mode from the arcade version was notably excluded.
- Beatmania Append 3rdMix Mini: Append disc included with the 3rdMix soundtrack. Features 5 new songs from the arcade 3rdMix.
- Beatmania Append GottaMix (May 29, 1999): The second stand-alone append disc release. Features 19 songs made by KCEJ unique to the PlayStation console and three songs from 4thMix that served as a preview.
- Beatmania Append 4thMix (September 9, 1999): Append disc and complete port of the arcade 4thMix. All-new songs from the arcade 4thMix were included in addition to new console tracks. The Bonus Edit mode can be accessed if the discs are swapped in the order of 3rdMix, then GottaMix, then 4thMix. The Bonus Edit mode adds songs from 3rdMix that were excluded from the previous console port.
- Beatmania Append 5thMIX (March 2, 2000): Append disc port of the arcade 5thMix. All-new songs from the arcade were included, with several console-exclusive songs available in Bonus Edit mode.
- Beatmania featuring Dreams Come True (July 21, 2000): Key disc release of the arcade version of the same name. Features music of the J-Pop duo Dreams Come True. The difficulty is notably lower than most other previous games.
- Beatmania Best Hits (July 27, 2000): First console release to drop the append disc format. It could act as a key disc and access the append releases. Includes songs from the first Beatmania up to 5thMix and GottaMix, chosen through fan votes on the internet.
- Beatmania Append GOTTAMIX 2 ~Going Global~ (September 7, 2000): The official follow-up release to GottaMix, again, featuring all-new songs exclusive to the console. The tracks were themed around music from around the world. The "Another" charts from completeMIX 2 marked as remixes were available in Bonus Edit mode.
- Beatmania Append ClubMix (December 21, 2000): Append disc and complete port of the arcade ClubMIX. Only one new secret console-exclusive track was added. The Bonus Edit mode included tracks from the arcade completeMIX2 with rearranged button sequences.
- Beatmania THE SOUND OF TOKYO! (March 29, 2001): PlayStation-exclusive key disc release. Produced by shibuya-kei artist Yasuharu Konishi, the difficulty of songs was indicated by the number of passengers on a plane. The songs cover a wide spectrum of skill levels that suit from beginners to experts.
- Beatmania 6thMix + Core Remix (January 31, 2002): Key disc release and the only coupled release. As the name implies, new songs from 6thMix and Core Remix are included. Both the Left Hand Scratch Mode and the Original Expert Course Mode were carried over from the console beatmania IIDX series.
- Beatmania (Europe) (June 2000): The European version of Beatmania included licensed songs from Moloko, Skank, Les Rhythmes Digitales, and more. Also included are classic beatmania tracks from various mixes. The European licenses are also featured in GottaMix 2.

Game Boy Color
Three games were released for the Game Boy color exclusively in Japan. The first two were backwards compatible with the classic Game Boy.

- Beatmania GB (March 11, 1999): Features 10 songs selected from 2ndMix, 3rdMix and Yebisu Mix. Another 10 original songs complete the music list. The game was developed by Konami Computer Entertainment Kobe.
- Beatmania GB 2 GatchaMix (November 25, 1999): Features 5 songs selected from GottaMix. Songs from famous artists such as the Yellow Magic Orchestra, Morning Musume, SMAP, Hikaru Utada in addition to animations songs like Mobile Suit Gundam Starship Girl Yamamoto Yohko make up 20 tracks. Hideo Kojima is listed as one of the producers and the title was developed by Konami Computer Entertainment Japan.
- Beatmania GB GatchaMix2 (September 28, 2000): A Game Boy Color-exclusive game, it follows the format of the previous GatchaMix with console tracks from the PlayStation and other popular licensed songs from real-life artists. This release also had 25 tracks in total. GatchaMix2 was previously going named to be Beatmania GB Net Jam, with the tracks available for download through the Mobile System GB service in Japan.

Wonderswan

- Beatmania for Wonderswan (April 28, 1999): The only Beatmania title for the Wonderswan, and also the only title released on the system from Konami. It featured 11 songs from the arcade 3rdMix. Because of the better sound processing capabilities for the system, the tracks closely resembled their arcade counterparts. It made use of the vertical orientation on the system to better mimic the arcade screen format. A snap-on mini turntable was bundled with the game. Also worth noting is that on some advertisement material, the game was referred to as vol.1 of a series, hinting that Konami had positive expectations in its sales and planned subsequent releases. It was sold around the same period as Beatmania GB.

Bemani Pocket
The Bemani Pocket line were portable gaming devices with a monochrome LCD screen, each featuring a :number of songs in a specific theme. As with most other Bemani releases, they were sold only in Japan.

- Beatmania Pocket: The only version to feature a body that mimicked the arcade cabinet.
- Beatmania Pocket2: The first release to feature a smoother design that was used with all subsequent releases.
- Beatmania Pocket -SummerMix-
- Beatmania Pocket -AnimeSong Mix1-: A selection of songs from titles by Go Nagai. The body had the color scheme of Mazinger Z.
- Beatmania Pocket -Tokimeki Memorial Edition-: Songs from the dating sim Tokimeki Memorial.
- Beatmania Pocket Skeleton: A special release of SummerMIX with a clear body given away as a prize. 5000 units were given away.
- Beatmania Pocket -AnimeSong Mix2- Features songs from titles by Shotaro Ishinomori.
- Beatmania Pocket 2000: The internal hardware was updated to improve sound quality, and was kept for all subsequent releases.
- Beatmania Pocket -Enjoy Georgia Signature-: A special edition for the Georgia Signature novelty goods stores of Japan. It was included inside a gift package for their Millennium Campaign.
- Beatmania Pocket -Hello Kitty Edition-: Hello Kitty's face is molded on the scratch disc part.
- Beatmania Pocket -AnimeSong Mix3-: A selection of songs from titles by Leiji Matsumoto.
- Beatmania Pocket -Tigers version: A special edition for the Hanshin Tigers baseball team of Japan featuring cheer songs for the team.
- Beatmania Pocket -Kawaii! version-: A collaborated release with the teenage girls' magazine Kawaii!.
- Beatmania Pocket -Tokimeki Memorial 2 edition: Songs from the dating sim Tokimeki Memorial 2.
- Beatmania Pocket -Love Stories-: A selection of love songs from various artists.
- Beatmania Pocket -KonaMix-: Various songs from classic Konami games.
- Beatmania Pocket -Best Hits 2000–: Popular songs from various artists from the year 2000.
- Beatmania Pocket -Tigers Version2: A special edition for the Hanshin Tigers baseball team of Japan featuring cheer songs for the team. New songs were not added, but a new play mode was.

== Reception ==
In Japan, Game Machine listed Beatmania on their March 1, 1998 issue as being the most-successful dedicated arcade game of the month. By May 1999, Beatmania had sold 6,700 arcade units, for which it received the Guinness World Record for Most Popular DJ-Simulation Arcade Game. By 2000, the game had sold 25,000 arcade machines.

The PlayStation version of Beatmania sold 1.09 million units in Japan by 2004, and eventually a total of 1.1 million units in Japan.
