= Kaneko =

Japanese video game publisher

Kaneko Co. Ltd.
- Type: Private
- Industry: Video games
- Founded: 1980
- Defunct: ca. 2007
- Fate: Defunct
- Headquarters: Tokyo, Japan

Kaneko Seisakusho (金子製作所), stylized as KANE<O, also referred to as Kaneko Co. Ltd. (カネコ株式会社), was a Japanese video game publisher founded in Suginami, Tokyo, Japan, by Hiroshi Kaneko. It published a number of games both under its brand and other companies, such as Air Buster, Nexzr, Shogun Warriors, DJ Boy, Guts'n, and the Gals Panic series.

The last game released by the company was Gals Panic S3 for the arcade in 2002.

== History ==
The company began business as developer, manufacturer, vendor, trader of electronic machines, and manufacturing medical equipment.

In 1982, it began its video game business as a developer of Taito Corporation's video games.

In 1990, Kaneko began to make its own video game under the KANEKO brand.

In Summer 1994, Kaneko closed its US branch and cancelled game projects such as Fido Dido and Socks the Cat Rocks the Hill.

In April 2000, Kaneko went through financial restructuring, and exited video game business except for maintenance department. The company was moved to Shibuya, Tokyo.

On July 25, 2001, Kaneko filed a lawsuit against Hitachi Software Engineering over the Super Kaneko NOVA System arcade board, and demanded 1.52 billion yen for damages.

On August 12, 2004, Kaneko filed for bankruptcy. However, the company's founder, Hiroshi Kaneko, vowed to continue.

In 2006, a civil lawsuit threatened to officially close the company. As of September 2007 the fate of the company is unknown, though assumed no longer existent.

== List of games ==
=== Arcade ===
- Air Buster (1990)
- B.Rap Boys (1992)
- Blood Warrior (1994)
- Boggy '84 (1983)
- Bonk's Adventure (1994, arcade version PC Genjin in Japan and B.C. Kid in Europe)
- Cyvern: The Dragon Weapons (1998)
- DJ Boy (1989, licensed by Sammy in US, Sega in Japan)
- Dr. Toppel's Adventure (1987, co-developed by Taito)
- Explosive Breaker (1992, Bakuretsu Breaker in Japan)
- Fighting Roller (1983, licensed by Williams as Roller Aces in the US)
- Fly Boy (1982, licensed by Atari, Inc. as Fast Freddie in the US)
- Gals Panic (1990 - Overseas, including US; published by Taito in Japan, licensed by Inter Trading in Korea)
- Gals Panic II (1993)
- Gals Panic 3 (1995)
- Gals Panic 4 (1996)
- Gals Panic S Extra Edition (1997)
- Gals Panic S2 (1999, a.k.a. Gals Panic SU in Korea)
- Gals Panic S3 (2002, Japan-exclusive)
- Go Go Mr. Yamaguchi (1985, licensed by Taito)
- Great 1000 Miles Rally (1994)
- Great 1000 Miles Rally 2 (1995)
- Guts'n (2000, developed by Kouyousha)
- Heavy Unit (1988, published by Taito)
- Jan Jan Paradise (1996, developed by Electro Design)
- Jan Jan Paradise 2 (1997, developed by Electro Design)
- Jump Coaster (1983)
- Lady Master Of Kung Fu (1985, published by Taito)
- Kabuki Z (1988, published by Taito)
- Kageki (1988, distributed by Romstar in the US)
- Prebillian (1986, co-developed by Taito)
- Samurai Nipponichi (1985, published and distributed by Magic Electronics as Samurai in the US)
- Red Clash (1981, distributed by Tecmo)
- Tel Jan (developed by Electro Design)
- The Berlin Wall (1991)
- The Kung-Fu Master Jackie Chan (1995)
- Magical Crystals
- Panic Street
- Sen-Know (線脳) (1998, developed by Kouyousha)
- Sengeki Striker (1997, co-developed by Warashi)
- Shogun Warriors (1992)
- Super Qix (distributed by Romstar in the US, co-developed by Taito)
- VS Block Breaker (Saru Kani Hamu Zou in Japan)
- Vs. Gong Fight / Ring Fighter (1984)
- Vs. Hot Smash (1987, co-developed by Taito)
- VS Mahjong Otomeryouran (developed by Electro Design)

=== Game Boy ===
- Peetan / Pitan (ピータン) (Game Boy version of the MSX game by Nippon Columbia)

=== MSX ===
- Boggy '84 (1984) (developed by Nippon Columbia)
- Jump Coaster (1984) (developed by Nippon Columbia)

=== NEC PC-9801 ===
- GalPani (1995) (developed by Creo I)
- GalPani II (1996) (developed by Mycom)

=== PC Engine/TurboGrafx-16 ===
- Air Buster (1990, developed by Inter State, published by Hudson Soft as Aero Blasters)
- Heavy Unit (1989, developed by Inter State, published by Taito)
- Nexzr (1992, developed by Inter State and published by Naxat-Soft, followed up by an expanded re-release in 1993 as Summer Carnival '93: Nexzr Special)
- Star Parodier (1992, developed by Inter State, published by Hudson Soft)
- Super Star Soldier (1990, developed by Inter State, published by Hudson Soft)

=== PlayStation ===
- Hiza no Ue no Partner: Kitty on Your Lap (1998)
- Silhouette Stories (1996)
- Zen-Nihon GT Senshuken Kai (1996)
- Zen-Nihon GT Senshuken Max-Rev (1997)

=== Sega Game Gear ===
- Berlin No Kabe (1991) (developed by Inter-State)

=== Sega Genesis ===
- Air Buster (1991, a.k.a. Aero Blasters in Japan, developed by Inter State)
- Chester Cheetah: Too Cool to Fool (1993, developed by System Vision)
- Chester Cheetah: Wild Wild Quest (1993, developed by Kaneko USA)
- Deadly Athlete (known outside Japan as Power Moves for the Super NES and Deadly Moves for the Sega Genesis)
- DJ Boy (1990, developed by Inter State)
- Heavy Unit: MD Special (1991, developed by Funari and published by Toho)
- Kageki: Fists Of Steel (1991, developed by Sage's Creation)
- Wani Wani World (1992, developed by Inter State)

=== Sega Saturn ===
- Gals Panic SS (1996)

=== Sharp X68000 ===
- Hishouzame / Flying Shark (1991)
- Kyukyoku Tiger / Twin Cobra (1993)

=== Super Nintendo Entertainment System ===
- Chester Cheetah: Too Cool to Fool (1992, developed by System Vision)
- Chester Cheetah: Wild Wild Quest (1994, developed by Kaneko USA)
- Power Athlete (known outside Japan as Power Moves for the Super NES and Deadly Moves for the Sega Genesis)
- Zen-Nihon GT Senshuken: Hyper Battle Game (1995) (co-developed by C.P. Brain and published by Banpresto)

== Unreleased games ==
- Air Buster (1994) (Sharp X68000)
- Asuka 120% Burning Fest. Limited (1998) (Arcade) (developed by Fill-In-Cafe)
- Battle Smash (1992) (Sega Genesis)
- Bonk's Adventure AC Version (PC Engine)
- DOX-Q (1990) (Arcade)
- Fido Dido (1994) (Super NES/Sega Genesis) (developed by Tweeny Weeny Games)
- Gals Panic 3D (1997) (Arcade)
- Gals Panic II (1994) (Super NES)
- Jump Kun (1983) (Arcade)
- Miru Kiku Asobu Fido Dido JiuQ BOX (1996) (Super NES/SEGA Saturn)
- Pack'n Bang Bang (1994) (Arcade)
- Poco Secret Flower (2000) (Arcade) (developed by CAVE)
- Rainbow Chips (1991) (Game Boy) (developed by Inter-State)
- Same! Same! Same! / Fire Shark in overseas (1994) (Sharp X68000)
- Socks the Cat Rocks the Hill (1993) (Super NES/Sega Genesis) (developed by Realtime Associates)
- Speed Dive (1997) (Arcade)
- Super Gals Panic (1994?) (Sega CD)
- Tatsujin / Truxton (1994) (Sharp X68000)
- Tenkū Retsuden Musashi (1992) (Sega Genesis) (unreleased port of Kabuki Z)
- The Berlin Wall (1991) (Sega Genesis, rumored that it got reskinned to Wani Wani World)
- The Soda Kids (1994)
- Yuta Buta Man-P (1999) (Arcade) (developed by CAVE)
