= DJ Boy =

1989 video game

- Box art for the Sega Genesis version
- Developer: Kaneko
- Publishers: JP: Kaneko; NA: Sammy
- Platforms: Arcade, Genesis
- Release: 1989
- Genre: Beat 'em up
- Modes: Single-player, multiplayer

DJ Boy (DJボーイ) is a 1989 beat 'em up arcade video game developed and published in Japan by Kaneko and in North America by Sammy. DJ Boy, also known as DJ Kid, was partially based on the hip hop culture of the U.S. cities. Many of the characters ride around on roller skates rather than walking or running.

== Plot ==
The premise of the home console game: A young man named Donald J. Boy (DJ Boy) is a roller fighter taking part of an ultimate fight-race known as "Rollergame", taking place in Cigaretch City, located on the outskirts of New York City. Many people were excited to see DJ Boy, but a roller fighter gang known as the Dark Knights want him out of the competition. Their leader, Heavy-Met Tony, calls his gang to kidnap his girlfriend Maria, who also comes into town and defeat DJ Boy. DJ Boy must rescue Maria, defeat the Dark Knights, and win the Rollergame competition in one adventure. The arcade plot tells a different story. Two rollerskaters named Bob & Tom (the two playable characters) were breakdancing to the beat of their boombox, until it got stolen from rollerskater thieves (possibly the Dark Knights), in which they must find and defeat them in order to retrieve what is rightfully theirs.

== Gameplay ==
DJ Boy skates across various stages and utilizes hand-to-hand combat moves in order to defeat opponents, culminating with a battle with a boss at the end of each level. Along the path, the player also encounters prizes, which then can be used later to purchase Power-ups from a store located at the end of each level (in the home version, the arcade simply tallied these as points). In the console versions of the game, as another game, River City Ransom, the "prizes" consist of coins that are dropped by defeated enemies, or food items like burgers that restore health.

== Reception ==
Reception

Review scores
Publication	Score
MegaTech	78% (Mega Drive)
Sega Power	30% (Mega Drive)
Console XS	59% (Mega Drive)

In Japan, Game Machine listed DJ Boy on their October 15, 1989 issue as being the seventh most-successful table arcade unit of the month. In North America, it was the top-grossing software conversion kit on the RePlay arcade charts in May 1990. Entertainment Weekly compared the US release to the Japanese version, and wrote that "D.J. Boy still does battle with an enormous black woman, only here she's a few shades lighter and no longer has a fondness for flatulence. Kaneko USA: '[The Japanese programmers] were looking for input, and obviously they got it from the wrong people.'"

The Mega Drive version received mixed reviews. MegaTech magazine gave a 78% review score, praising the game being fun to play although giving criticism that the game being too easy. Sega Power magazine gave the game an overall 30% score, criticizing the boring gameplay, the levels being too easy, the dull graphics, terrible sound and concluding "A nob beat-em-up with added nobby bits. The levels are dull, the moves limited and the end-of-level bosses too tough to beat. DJ Boy is unfriendly, unfunny and unfair." Mega placed the Mega Drive version at #4 in their list of the 10 Worst Mega Drive Games of All Time. Console XS magazine gave the game a 59% score, initially praising the game's originality but also criticizing the game being easy and too simple concluding "With little variation you wouldn't be playing this for long."

== Legacy ==
In 1992, a sequel, B.Rap Boys (Bラップボーイズ), was produced containing similar designs and content. The game features three player simultaneous action using characters that are different from one another (rather than palette swaps), and the optional use of weapons and vehicles, as well as a more robust fighting system.

The game's soundtrack is notable for having extensively sampled studio recordings "Famous Last Words" and "Average Day" from the rare 1991 Japanese CD single Famous Last Words (published by Midi Inc.) by former Japanese hip-hop group 3 Stories High. The group (from 1991 to 92) consisted of members, mostly from the West Coast street dance, poppin', and hip-hop scene, Timothy Earl Solomon (credited as D.O.G. and better known as Popin' Pete), alongside the late Stephan Mark Nicholas (credited as Peter Gun and better known as Skeeter Rabbit), Doc Clarke (credited as Doc), and the late DJ Koji ("Wild Cherry"). Because they didn't achieve mainstream commercial success as a group their inclusion in B. Rap Boys became their only cult-classic legacy, though each member did achieve their measure of success outside of it, both before and after. Additional sampled music includes the singles "God Bless You" by music production and songwriting duo Mark Sandell and Neal Watson and "Jail House Rap" by the Fat Boys and Kurtis Blow. Because of this, the game itself is also recognized as being among the earliest arcade games to feature a licensed soundtrack.

In Japan, Game Machine listed B.Rap Boys on their August 1, 1992 issue as being the thirteenth most-successful table arcade unit of the month.
