= Battle Cross (1982 video game) =

1982 video game

- Developer: Omori Electric
- Publishers: Omori Electric; Sony
- Platforms: Arcade, MSX
- Release: 1982: Arcade; 1984: MSX
- Genre: Shooter
- Modes: Single-player, multiplayer

Battle Cross is a shoot 'em up released in arcades by Omori Electric (also known as Omori Electronic) in 1982. The player controls a fighter spacecraft by moving around the screen and shooting enemies. In 1984 Sony published a version for the Sony Hit-Bit 75 MSX computer.
