= List of video game musicians =

The following is a list of computer and video game musicians, those who have worked in the video game industry to produce video game soundtracks or otherwise contribute musically. A broader list of major figures in the video game industry is also available.

For a full article, see video game music. The list is sorted in alphabetical order by last name.

== A ==
- Rod Abernethy – The Hobbit, Star Trek: Legacy, King Arthur, Rise of the Kasai, Blazing Angels, Marvel Universe, The Gauntlet, The Sims Bustin' Out
- Masamichi Amano – Quest 64
- Yoshino Aoki – Breath of Fire III, Breath of Fire IV, Mega Man Battle Network series, Mega Man Star Force series
- Hirokazu Ando - Kirby series, Super Smash Bros., Super Smash Bros. Melee
- Noriyuki Asakura – Tenchu: Stealth Assassins, Tenchu 2: Birth of the Stealth Assassins, Tenchu: Wrath of Heaven, Way of the Samurai, Way of the Samurai 2, Kamiwaza

== B ==
- Michael Bacon – VS, Duke Nukem: Land of the Babes, EverQuest II: The Shadow Odyssey
- Angelo Badalamenti – Indigo Prophecy
- Kelly Bailey – Half-Life, Half-Life 2, Half-Life 2: Episode One, Half-Life 2: Episode Two, Portal
- Clint Bajakian – Star Wars Jedi Knight II: Jedi Outcast, Star Wars Jedi Knight: Jedi Academy, Star Wars: Knights of the Old Republic
- Lorne Balfe – Call of Duty: Modern Warfare 2, Skylanders: Spyro's Adventure, Assassin's Creed: Revelations, Skylanders: Giants, Assassin's Creed III, Beyond: Two Souls
- Danny Baranowsky – Super Meat Boy, Canabalt, Crypt of the Necrodancer and The Binding of Isaac
- Stephen Barton – Apex Legends, Call of Duty 4: Modern Warfare, Titanfall series, Star Wars Jedi: Fallen Order, Star Wars Jedi: Survivor, Watch Dogs: Legion
- Joe Basquez – Ultima Online
- Jean Baudlot – Bio Challenge, Bad Dudes, Future Wars, Castle Warrior, Beach Volley, Snow Brothers, Operation Stealth, Ivanhoe, Cruise for a Corpse, Flashback: The Quest for Identity
- Stephen Baysted – Project Cars series, Fast and Furious Crossroads, Need for Speed: Shift 2 Unleashed
- Robin Beanland – Killer Instinct series, Conker's Bad Fur Day, Sea of Thieves
- David Bergeaud – Ratchet and Clank series, Resistance: Fall of Man
- Daniel Bernstein – Blood, Claw
- Teddy Blass – Chain Shooter, Fortune's Prime
- Alexander Brandon – Unreal, Unreal Tournament, Deus Ex, Gauntlet: Seven Sorrows, Alpha Protocol, Unreal 2, Deus Ex: Invisible War, Battlestar Galactica, Bejeweled 3 (with Peter Hajba)
- Allister Brimble – Backyard Sports series, Medal of Honor: Infiltrator, Mortal Kombat, Mortal Kombat II, RollerCoaster Tycoon, RollerCoaster Tycoon 2, Star Wars: Episode II – Attack of the Clones, Star Wars: Flight of the Falcon, Star Wars Episode I: Jedi Power Battles, X-COM: Terror from the Deep
- Jeff Broadbent – Assassin's Creed Identity, Call of Duty: Mobile, Grid, PlanetSide Arena, PlanetSide 2, Resident Evil 3, Resident Evil: Resistance, Transformers: Dark of the Moon
- Russell Brower – World of Warcraft: The Burning Crusade, World of Warcraft: Wrath of the Lich King, World of Warcraft: Cataclysm, Diablo III, Starcraft 2
- Bill Brown – Command and Conquer: Generals, Command & Conquer: Generals Zero Hour, Return to Castle Wolfenstein, Tom Clancy's Ghost Recon, Tom Clancy's Ghost Recon: Island Thunder, Tom Clancy's Ghost Recon: Jungle Storm, Tom Clancy's Rainbow Six, Tom Clancy's Rainbow Six: Rogue Spear, Tom Clancy's Rainbow Six: Black Thorn, Tom Clancy's Rainbow Six 3: Raven Shield, Tom Clancy's Rainbow Six: Lockdown, Wolfenstein: Enemy Territory
- David Buckley — Shrek Forever After (video game), additional music for Metal Gear Solid 4: Guns of the Patriots, Batman: Arkham Knight and Batman: Arkham VR with Nick Arundel

== C ==
- Sean Callery – James Bond 007: Everything or Nothing, 24: The Game
- Pedro Macedo Camacho – Star Citizen, Wolfenstein II: The New Colossus, Audiosurf (Independent Games Festival 2008 Excellence in Audio Award Winner), Fury (Auran, Gamecock, Codemasters), A Vampyre Story (Autumn Moon Entertainment)
- Marc Canham — Stuntman (video game), Taz: Wanted, Driver 3, Act of War: Direct Action, 24: The Game, Reservoir Dogs (video game), Driver: Parallel Lines, Driver 76, Far Cry 2, Killzone 2, Split/Second, Chime, Driver: San Francisco, The Secret World, Infamous First Light, Infamous Second Son
- Stuart Chatwood – Road Rash 3D, NHL 2002, Prince of Persia: The Sands of Time, Prince of Persia: Warrior Within, Prince of Persia: The Two Thrones, Battles of Prince of Persia, Prince of Persia: Revelations, Prince of Persia: Rival Swords
- Jun Chikuma – Faxanadu, Adventure Island, Bomberman series
- Jamie Christopherson – Lineage II: The Chaotic Chronicle, Lost Planet, Lord of the Rings: The Battle For Middle-Earth, Metal Gear Rising: Revengeance
- Elia Cmíral – The Last Express
- Combichrist – DmC: Devil May Cry
- Gareth Coker – Ori and the Blind Forest, Ori and the Will of the Wisps, Ark: Survival Evolved, Immortals Fenyx Rising, Halo Infinite
- Peter Connelly – Three games from the Tomb Raider series
- Stewart Copeland – Urban Strike, Spyro the Dragon series (Spyro the Dragon to Spyro: Enter the Dragonfly), Alone in the Dark: The New Nightmare
- Normand Corbeil – Fahrenheit, Heavy Rain, Beyond: Two Souls
- Jonathan Coulton – Portal, Portal 2, Left 4 Dead 2
- Jessica Curry - Dear Esther, Everybody's Gone to the Rapturee

== D ==
- Ben Daglish
- Joris de Man – Killzone series, Horizon Zero Dawn
- Charles Deenen – M.C. Kids, The Lost Vikings (with Allister Brimble), Descent II (mixing)
- Rom Di Prisco – Fortnite, Xtreme Sports Arcade, Rebel Moon Rising, Need for Speed II, Need for Speed III: Hot Pursuit, World Cup 98, Sled Storm, Carnivores 2, Need for Speed: High Stakes, NHL 2000, FIFA 2000, 007 Racing, Need for Speed: Porsche Unleashed, Rune, Blair Witch Volume 2: The Legend of Coffin Rock, Rune: Viking Warlord, NHL 2001, Rune: Halls of Valhalla, SSX Tricky, Need for Speed: Hot Pursuit 2, NHL 2002, SpyHunter 2, Dead Man's Hand, Full Auto, Full Auto 2: Battlelines, Unreal Tournament 3, SSX, Guacamelee! and Guacamelee! 2
- Sascha Dikiciyan – Quake II, The Long Dark, Mass Effect 3, Quake 3 Arena, James Bond Tomorrow never dies
- Ramin Djawadi – Game of Thrones: A Telltale Games Series, Gears of War 4, Gears 5, Medal of Honor, Medal of Honor: Warfighter
- James Dooley – Epic Mickey
- Christopher Drake – Batman: Arkham Origins, Injustice: Gods Among Us, Injustice 2
- Howard Drossin – Comix Zone, Sonic Spinball
- Dynamedion - Hitman: Absolution, Halo Legends, Call of Duty 4, Mortal Kombat X

== E ==
- Randy Edelman
- Greg Edmonson – Uncharted series
- Takahito Eguchi – The Bouncer, Final Fantasy X-2
- Jared Emerson-Johnson – Sam & Max series, Wallace and Gromit's Grand Adventures, Back to the Future: The Game, Jurassic Park: The Game, The Walking Dead (video game)
- Eminence Symphony Orchestra – Odin Sphere, Deltora Quest: The Seven Jewels, Valkyria Chronicles, Diablo III, Soulcalibur IV
- Jon Everist - BattleTech (video game), Overwatch 2, Shadowrun: Hong Kong, The Solitaire Conspiracy

== F ==
- Eveline Fischer (now Eveline Novakovic) – Donkey Kong Country (with Robin Beanland and David Wise), Donkey Kong Country 3: Dixie Kong's Double Trouble! (with David Wise)
- The Flight – Alien: Isolation, Horizon: Zero Dawn
- Tim Follin – Ghouls and Ghosts (Amiga and C64 versions), Ecco the Dolphin: Defender of the Future (Dreamcast), and various assorted tracks for 8- and 16-bit videogames.
- Troels Brun Folmann – Tomb Raider: Legend and Tomb Raider: Anniversary
- Dan Forden – Mortal Kombat series
- Toby Fox – Undertale, Hiveswap, Deltarune, Super Smash Bros. Ultimate, Little Town Hero, Pokémon Sword and Shield
- Hiroshi Fujioka – Growlanser II, Growlanser III, Langrisser III
- Yasuhiko Fukuda – sometimes credited as Hirohiko Fukuda, known for Emerald Dragon (SNES)
- Kenichiro Fukui - Einhänder
- Brad Fuller (composer) – Tengen Tetris, Marble Madness, Gauntlet II, S.T.U.N. Runner, RoadBlasters, Xybots, Blasteroids, Klax (video game), Steel Talons, Off the Wall (video game), Toobin', Rampart (video game), APB (1987 video game), 720°, Peter Pack Rat, T-Mek, Rolling Thunder (video game), Vindicators, Space Lords, Firefox (video game), Road Runner (video game), Explore Technologies
- Takeshi Furukawa – The Last Guardian

== G ==
- Martin Galway – Commodore 64 sound programmer and composer for Ocean Software and Imagine Software (after Ocean bought the company).
- Genki Rockets – Lumines II, Child of Eden
- Raphaël Gesqua – Flashback: The Quest For Identity, Mr. Nutz, Moto Racer
- Michael Giacchino – Medal of Honor series (1999–2003, 2007), Call of Duty series (2003-2004), Secret Weapons Over Normandy, BLACK
- Mick Gordon – Need for Speed: Shift, Shift 2 Unleashed, Killer Instinct, Wolfenstein: The New Order, Doom, Doom Eternal
- Simon Gosling – Croc 2
- Jason Graves – Command and Conquer 4, Dead Space series, City of Heroes, Silent Hunter series, Tomb Raider (2013 video game), Until Dawn
- Fred Gray – Shadowfire, Mutants, Madballs, Enigma Force, Black Lamp, Eco, Stargoose, Victory Road
- Gustaf Grefberg – Enclave (video game), The Chronicles of Riddick: Escape from Butcher Bay
- Harry Gregson-Williams – Metal Gear Solid 2: Sons of Liberty, Metal Gear Solid 3: Snake Eater, Metal Gear Solid 4: Guns of the Patriots
- Mark Griskey – Harry Potter and the Goblet of Fire, Star Wars: Knights of the Old Republic 2: The Sith Lords, Star Wars Episode 3: Revenge of the Sith, Rayman Raving Rabbids, Rayman Raving Rabbids 2

== H ==
- Gordy Haab – Star Wars: The Old Republic, Star Wars Battlefront series, Halo Wars 2
- Peter Hajba – Bejeweled series
- Masashi Hamauzu – SaGa Frontier 2, Tobal No. 1, Final Fantasy X, Final Fantasy XIII trilogy, Final Fantasy VII Remake
- Kentarō Haneda – Wizardry 1, 2, and 3; Wizardry V: Heart of the Maelstrom
- James Hannigan – Command and Conquer: Red Alert 3, Command & Conquer 4: Tiberian Twilight, F1 Manager, FIFA Soccer Manager, Grand Prix 4, Harry Potter & the Deathly Hallows – Part 1, Harry Potter & the Order of the Phoenix, Harry Potter & the Deathly Hallows – Part 2, Harry Potter & the Half-Blood Prince, The Lord of the Rings: Aragorn's Quest, Sim Coaster, Sim Theme Park, Warhammer: Dark Omen
- Jon Hare – Cannon Fodder series, Sensible Soccer series, Sensible Golf
- Kurt Harland – Soul Reaver
- Aki Hata (occasionally credited as AKI) – Rocket Knight Adventures (with Masanori Ohuchi, Masanori Adachi, Hiroshi Kobayashi and Michiru Yamane), Dynamite Headdy (with Norio Hanzawa and Nazo² Suzuki)
- Kärtsy Hatakka – Max Payne, Max Payne 2
- Christophe Héral – Beyond Good & Evil, Rayman Origins, Rayman Legends
- Norihiko Hibino – Metal Gear: Ghost Babel, Zone of the Enders, Metal Gear Solid 2: Sons of Liberty, Boktai, Metal Gear Solid 3: Snake Eater
- Miki Higashino – Genso Suikoden II, Genso Suikogaiden series
- Susumu Hirasawa – Sword of the Berserk: Guts' Rage, BERSERK ~Hawk of the Millennium Empire Arc - Chapter of the Holy Demon War~
- Joe Hisaishi – Ni no Kuni series
- Silas Hite – Skate 3, The Simpsons, The Sims 2, The Sims 2: University, The Sims 2: Open For Business, The Sims 2: Pets, The Sims 2: Castaway, The Sims 2: Bon Voyage, My Sims, My Sims: Agents, MySims Kingdom, MySims Racing, Boom Blox, Boom Blox: Bash Party, Academy of Champions, Mean Girls, Legally Blonde, Wordsworth, Frogger: Ancient Shadow (with Mutato Muzika)
- Michael Hoenig – Baldur's Gate, Baldur's Gate II: Shadows of Amn
- Alec Holowka – Aquaria
- Shinji Hosoe – Ridge Racer series, Street Fighter EX series
- Niamh Houston - Super Hexagon, Dicey Dungeons
- Rob Hubbard – Many Atari 8-bit and C64 games including International Karate and Jet Set Willy
- Chris Huelsbeck – Apidya, Great Giana Sisters, Turrican series
- Michael Hunter – Grand Theft Auto: San Andreas, Grand Theft Auto IV
- Andrew Hulshult - Dusk, Quake Champions, Doom Eternal: The Ancient Gods Part 1

== I ==
- Go Ichinose – Pokémon series, Drill Dozer, Pocket Card Jockey
- Arata Iiyoshi - Kamaitachi no Yoru ×3 (with Kojiro Nakashima), Pokémon Mystery Dungeon series, Ninjala, Bemani series
- Laura Intravia - Arkhangel: The House of the Seven Stars
- Mark Isham
- Jun Ishikawa – Kirby series
- Takeharu Ishimoto – Crisis Core: Final Fantasy VII, The World Ends with You, Kingdom Hearts series, Neo: The World Ends With You
- Daisuke Ishiwatari – Guilty Gear series
- Kenji Ito – SaGa series, Seiken Densetsu 1, Tobal No. 1, Shin Megami Tensei: Devil Survivor 2
- Noriyuki Iwadare – Langrisser series, Lunar series, Grandia series, Growlancer, Ace Attorney series, Radiata Stories
- Masaharu Iwata – Final Fantasy Tactics (with Hitoshi Sakimoto), Stella Deus: The Gate of Eternity (with Hitoshi Sakimoto), Tactics Ogre: Let Us Cling Together (with Hitoshi Sakimoto)
- Hiroyuki Iwatsuki – Mitsume ga Tōru (NES), Wild Guns (with Haruo Ohashi), Mighty Morphin Power Rangers: The Fighting Edition (with Haruo Ohashi), Mighty Morphin Power Rangers: The Movie (SNES, with Haruo Ohashi), Mighty Morphin Power Rangers (SNES, with Kinuyo Yamashita and Iku Mizutani)
- Takahiro Izutani – Metal Gear Solid: Portable Ops, Yakuza 2, Metal Gear Solid 4: Guns of the Patriots, Ninja Blade

== J ==
- Henry Jackman – Just Cause 3, Uncharted 4: A Thief's End
- Woody Jackson – Red Dead Redemption, L.A. Noire, Max Payne 3, Grand Theft Auto V, Red Dead Redemption 2
- Steve Jablonsky – The Sims 3, Prince of Persia: The Forgotten Sands, Command & Conquer, Transformers, Gears of War series
- Lee Jackson – Rise of the Triad, Duke Nukem 3D, Shadow Warrior, Stargunner
- Richard Jacques – Sonic R, Metropolis Street Racer, Headhunter, Sonic Chronicles: The Dark Brotherhood
- JAM Project – Super Robot Wars series
- Richard Joseph – Sensible Software, Bitmap Brothers, many others from 1986 to 2006

== K ==
- Akari Kaida – Breath of Fire III, Mega Man & Bass, Mega Man Battle Network, Ōkami
- Yuki Kajiura – Xenosaga Episode II: Jenseits von Gut und Böse, Xenosaga Episode III: Also sprach Zarathustra
- Yoko Kanno – Genghis Khan, Nobunaga's Ambition series, Uncharted Waters series, Macross Ace Frontier, Macross Ultimate Frontier, Macross Triangle Frontier
- Jake Kaufman – Shantae series, M&M's Minis Madness, Legend of Kay, TMNT (Nintendo DS), Contra 4
- Hiroshi Kawaguchi – Space Harrier, Out Run, Fantasy Zone, After Burner, Power Drift, Sword of Vermillion
- Kenji Kawai – Sansara Naga (series), Deep Fear, Folklore
- Tamayo Kawamoto – Commando, Legendary Wings, Ghouls 'n Ghosts, RayForce
- Motohiro Kawashima - Batman Returns (Sega 8-bit versions), Streets of Rage series
- Hiroki Kikuta – Secret of Mana, Seiken Densetsu 3, Soukaigi, Koudelka
- Grant Kirkhope – Banjo-Kazooie, Donkey Kong 64, Banjo-Tooie, GoldenEye 007, Perfect Dark, Blast Corps
- Frank Klepacki – All of Westwood Studios' games while the developer was independent, including the popular Command & Conquer series.
- Chris Kline – Bionic Commando (2009), Pinball Hall of Fame: The Gottlieb Collection, Pinball Hall of Fame: The Williams Collection
- Mark Knight - Duke Nukem: Total Meltdown, Dungeon Keeper 2, F1 2015/2016, Populous: The Beginning
- Geoff Knorr - Civilization IV, Civilization V, Elemental: Fallen Enchantress, Civilization: Beyond Earth, Civilization VI
- Saori Kobayashi – Panzer Dragoon series, Shadowgate 64: Trials of the Four Towers
- Konami Kukeiha Club (KONAMI's sound team)
- Koji Kondo – Super Mario series, The Legend of Zelda series, Star Fox 64, Yume Kojo: Doki Doki Panic, Shin Onigashima, The Mysterious Murasame Castle
- Darren Korb – Bastion, Hades, Transistor
- Yuzo Koshiro – Ys I, Ys II, The Revenge of Shinobi, Sonic the Hedgehog, ActRaiser, Streets of Rage series, Super Adventure Island, Castlevania: Portrait of Ruin, Etrian Odyssey series, 7th Dragon series
- Taro Kudo – Axelay, Super Castlevania IV (with Masanori Adachi)
- Kukeiha Club – see KONAMI KuKeiHa CLUB
- Jesper Kyd – Assassin's Creed series (Ezio story), Borderlands series, Hitman series. Darksiders II, Warhammer: End Times – Vermintide, Warhammer: Vermintide 2, Warhammer 40,000: Darktide.

== L ==
- Michael Land – Monkey Island series, Star Wars games, The Dig
- Christopher Larkin - Hollow Knight series
- Tim Larkin – realMyst, Uru: Ages Beyond Myst, Pariah (video game), Myst V: End of Ages
- Jean-Marc Lederman – Atlantis, Atlantis Sky Patrol, Fairies, Mystic Inn, Titanic Hidden Expedition, Snow Racer 1998, Solar Crusade, Turbogems, Fever Frenzy, SocioTown, Force of Arms
- Barry Leitch – Gauntlet Dark Legacy, Rush 2, Rush 2049, Spider, Privateer Righteous Fire, TFX, Lotus 2, Utopia, Top Gear, Pixter, Supercars 2
- Christopher Lennertz – Medal of Honor series (2003–2005), James Bond 007: From Russia with Love, The Sims 3: Pets, Mass Effect 3, Scalebound
- Paul Leonard-Morgan – Battlefield Hardline, Warhammer 40,000: Dawn of War III, Cyberpunk 2077
- Daniel Licht – Silent Hill: Downpour, Dishonored series
- Russell Lieblich – Early Intellivision games
- Ian Livingstone - F1 racing series, Battlefield 1943, Grid 2, Grid Legends, MotoGP 18 & 19, Napoleon: Total War, Total War: Warhammer, Total War: Warhammer III, Warhammer 40,000: Fire Warrior
- Richard Ludlow - Hexany Audio
- Rob Lord – Aladdin
- Alph Lyla (CAPCOM's sound team)

== M ==
- Naoki Maeda – Bemani series
- Jun Maeda – Moon, Kanon, Air, Clannad, Tomoyo After: It's a Wonderful Life, Little Busters!, Rewrite
- Josh Mancell – Crash Bandicoot (first four games), Interstate '82 (with Mark Mothersbaugh), Jak and Daxter Trilogy, The Condemned, The Megalex, Johnny Mnemonic
- Mark Mancina
- Christopher Mann – Independence War Deluxe Edition and Independence War 2: Edge of Chaos
- Kevin Manthei – Kung Fu Panda, Marvel Universe Online, Upshift Strikeracer, Xiaolin Showdown, Ultimate Spider-Man, Kill Switch, Twisted Metal Black, Civilization II
- Jerry Martin – SimCity 4: Rush Hour
- Junichi Masuda – Pokémon series, Mendel Palace, Pulseman, Mario & Wario
- Noriko Matsueda – Bahamut Lagoon, Chrono Trigger, Tobal No. 1, The Bouncer, Final Fantasy X-2
- Hayato Matsuo – Shiren the Wanderer series, Ogre Battle series, Front Mission 3, Final Fantasy XII
- Michael McCann – Splinter Cell: Double Agent, Deus Ex: Human Revolution, Deus Ex: Mankind Divided, XCOM: Enemy Unknown, XCOM 2
- Peter McConnell – Grim Fandango, Psychonauts
- Bear McCreary - God of War, SOCOM 4: U.S. Navy SEALs, Dark Void
- Nathan McCree – Tomb Raider, Tomb Raider 2 and Tomb Raider 3
- Shoji Meguro – Shin Megami Tensei III: Nocturne, Devil Summoner series, Persona series, Catherine, Metaphor: ReFantazio
- Robyn Miller – Myst, Riven, Obduction (video game)
- Toru Minegishi – The Legend of Zelda series, Super Mario 3D World, Splatoon series
- Yasunori Mitsuda – Chrono Trigger, Mario Party, Xenogears, Xenosaga, Chrono Cross, Front Mission: Gun Hazard (with Nobuo Uematsu, Junya Nakano, and Masashi Hamauzu), Radical Dreamers, Legaia 2: Duel Saga, Shadow Hearts
- Takenobu Mitsuyoshi - Daytona USA, Virtua Fighter series
- Yuu Miyake – Tekken series, Katamari Damacy
- Hiroshi Miyazaki (sometimes referred to as Miyashiro Sugito or MIYA) – Captain Tsubasa 5: Hasha no Shogo Campione, Tecmo Super Bowl (SFC), Ninja Gaiden III: The Ancient Ship of Doom, Ninja Gaiden Trilogy, Kagero: Deception II, Deception III: Dark Delusion, Monster Rancher Hop-A-Bout
- Naoshi Mizuta – Rockman & Forte, Parasite Eve 2, Final Fantasy XI
- Jonathan Morali - Life Is Strange series
- Mike Morasky – Portal, Portal 2, Team Fortress 2, Left 4 Dead, Left 4 Dead 2, Counter-Strike: Global Offensive, Half-Life: Alyx
- Mark Morgan – Fallout, Fallout 2, Planescape: Torment, Descent II, Wasteland series
- Akihiko Mori – Wonder Project J series
- Trevor Morris – Army of Two, Dragon Age: Inquisition, Marvel: Ultimate Alliance 2, Need for Speed Carbon
- Mark Mothersbaugh – Crash Bandicoot (as a music producer), The Sims 2, Sewer Shark
- Atsuhiro Motoyama – Umihara Kawase, Ace Striker, Battle Bakraid, Bloody Roar (video game), Sorcer Striker, Dimahoo, Tekken Advance, Kuru Kuru Kururin, Kururin Paradise, Fire Pro Wrestling Returns, Style Savvy
- Rika Muranaka – Castlevania: Symphony of the Night, Silent Hill, Metal Gear Solid series (all ending themes)
- Mutato Muzika – see Mark Mothersbaugh

== N ==
- Ryo Nagamatsu – Mario Kart series, Wii Sports Resort, Super Mario Galaxy 2, Nintendo Land, The Legend of Zelda series, Splatoon series
- Hideki Naganuma – Jet Set Radio, Jet Set Radio Future, Ollie King, Sonic Rush
- Masato Nakamura – Sonic the Hedgehog, Sonic the Hedgehog 2
- Takayuki Nakamura – Virtua Fighter, Tobal 2, Ehrgeiz
- Junya Nakano – Front Mission: Gun Hazard, Dewprism (Threads of Fate in the U.S.), Tobal No. 1, Final Fantasy X
- Akito Nakatsuka – Zelda II: The Adventure of Link, Ice Climber
- Manabu Namiki – Battle Garegga, Armed Police Batrider, DoDonPachi Dai Ou Jou, Ketsui: Kizuna Jigoku Tachi, Espgaluda, Mushihimesama, Deathsmiles, Konami ReBirth series
- Michiko Naruke – Wild Arms series
- Tomohito Nishiura – Dark Cloud, Dark Cloud 2, Rogue Galaxy, Professor Layton series
- Graeme Norgate – TimeSplitters, TimeSplitters 2, TimeSplitters: Future Perfect

== O ==
- Martin O'Donnell – Halo series, Myth series Destiny, Oni
- Hisayoshi Ogura – Zuntata sound team, Darius, Darius II (also called Sagaia), Darius Gaiden, G Darius, The Ninja Warriors, Rainbow Islands (Master System version, with Tadashi Kimijima)
- Kow Otani –Shadow of the Colossus
- Tomoya Ohtani – Sonic the Hedgehog series, Billy Hatcher and the Giant Egg, Rhythm Thief & the Emperor's Treasure
- Keiichi Okabe – Drakengard 3, Nier series, Tekken series
- Shinji Orito – Dōsei, Moon, One: Kagayaku Kisetsu e, Kanon, Air, Clannad, Tomoyo After: It's a Wonderful Life, Little Busters!, Rewrite
- Michiru Ōshima – Genghis Khan II: Clan of the Grey Wolf, ICO
- Kenichi Ōkuma – Ring ni Kakero
- Atli Örvarsson – EVE: Dust 514, Free Realms, Teenage Mutant Ninja Turtles: Mutants Unleashed

== P ==
- John Paesano – Mass Effect: Andromeda, Detroit: Become Human, Spider-Man
- Winifred Phillips – Assassin's Creed Liberation, LittleBigPlanet 3, God of War, Homefront: The Revolution, Total War Battles: Kingdom, LittleBigPlanet 2, Speed Racer, LittleBigPlanet Vita, The Da Vinci Code, LittleBigPlanet Karting, Call of Champions, Shrek the Third, LittleBigPlanet 2: Toy Story (DLC), SimAnimals, LittleBigPlanet 2: Cross Controller, Charlie and the Chocolate Factory, Legend of the Guardians: The Owls of Ga'Hoole, The Maw, Fighter Within, Spore Hero
- Stéphane Picq – MegaRace, Qin, KULT: The Temple of Flying Saucers, Dune, Extase, Jumping Jackson, Purple Saturn Day, Full Metal Planete, Lost Eden, KGB (computer game), Commander Blood
- Kirill Pokrovsky – Divinity series
- Robert "Bobby" Prince – Doom, Doom II, The Ultimate Doom, Wolfenstein 3D, Spear of Destiny, Commander Keen in Goodbye Galaxy!, Commander Keen in Aliens Ate My Babysitter, Duke Nukem 3D, Rise of the Triad, Axis and Allies, DemonStar, Abuse, Word Rescue, Pickle Wars, Math Rescue, Xenophage: Alien Bloodsport, Catacomb 3D
- Marcin Przybyłowicz – The Witcher series, Cyberpunk 2077
- Ari Pulkkinen – Angry Birds, Angry Birds Seasons, Trine (video game), Trine 2, Dead Nation, Outland (video game), Super Stardust HD, Shadowgrounds, Shadowgrounds Survivor

== R ==
- Lena Raine – Celeste, Minecraft, Chicory: A Colorful Tale, Deltarune
- Simon Ravn – Viking: Battle for Asgard, Empire: Total War, Napoleon: Total War
- Mike Reagan – God of War, God of War II, God of War III, God of War: Ghost of Sparta, Darkwatch, Darksiders, Life Is Strange: Farewell, Conan, Devil's Third, Trials Evolution, Twisted Metal: Black
- Trent Reznor – Quake
- Kevin Riepl – Unreal Tournament 2003, Unreal Tournament 2004, Unreal Championship 2: The Liandri Conflict, The Bible Game, Gears of War, Unreal Tournament 3, Huxley, Hunted: The Demon's Forge, Aliens: Colonial Marines
- Stephen Rippy – Age of Empires series, Halo Wars
- Paul Romero – Heroes of Might and Magic series, EverQuest
- Daniel Rosenfeld – Minecraft
- Lior Rosner – Syphon Filter: Dark Mirror
- Mark Rutherford – Rogue Warrior (video game) (2009) – Bethesda Softworks, Aliens vs. Predator (2010) – Sega, NeverDead – Konami, Sniper Elite V2 – Rebellion Developments and 505 Games.

== S ==
- Toshihiko Sahashi – Blue Stinger
- Shogo Sakai – Glory of Heracles series, Kirby series, Super Smash Bros. series, Mother 3
- Sakari – Independent game musicians from around the world.
- Hitoshi Sakimoto – Super Hockey '94, Radiant Silvergun, Final Fantasy Tactics, Final Fantasy Tactics Advance, Final Fantasy XII, Breath of Fire V: Dragon Quarter, Tactics Ogre: Let Us Cling Together (with Masaharu Iwata)
- Motoi Sakuraba – Tales Series (with Shinji Tamura), Tenshi no Uta: Shiroki Tsubasa no Inori, Star Ocean series, Golden Sun series, Hiouden Series, Valkyrie Profile, Mario Tennis and Mario Golf series, Baten Kaitos series, Mario Sports Superstars
- Tom Salta – Deathloop, Halo: Spartan Assault, Halo: Spartan Strike, Need For Speed Underground 2, PUBG: Battlegrounds, Tom Clancy's Ghost Recon: Future Soldier, Tom Clancy's Ghost Recon Advanced Warfighter, Tom Clancy's Ghost Recon Advanced Warfighter 2, Tom Clancy's H.A.W.X 2, Wolfenstein: Youngblood
- Michael Salvatori – Halo series, Destiny series
- George 'The Fat Man' Sanger – Wing Commander, The 7th Guest, Master of Orion
- Nobuyoshi Sano – Drakengard, Ghost in the Shell: Stand Alone Complex (PS2), Ridge Racer series, Tekken series
- Gustavo Santaolalla – The Last of Us series
- Ryuji Sasai – Final Fantasy Mystic Quest, Bushido Blade 2, Final Fantasy Legend III (with Chihiro Fujioka), Rudora no Hihou (Rudra's Secret Treasure), Tobal No.1 (with Yasunori Mitsuda, Masashi Hamauzu, Kenji Ito, Yasuhiro Kawakami, Junya Nakano, Yoko Shimomura & Noriko Matsueda), Xak (with Tadahiro Nitta)
- Tenpei Sato – Marl Kingdom series, Disgaea: Hour of Darkness, Phantom Brave
- Kan Sawada
- Hiroyuki Sawano – Xenoblade Chronicles X
- Kazuo Sawa – Nekketsu Kouha: Kunio-Kun, River City Ransom, Super Dodge Ball
- Sarah Schachner - Assassin's Creed Origins, Assassin's Creed Valhalla, Call of Duty: Infinite Warfare, Call of Duty: Modern Warfare
- Rik Schaffer – The Elder Scrolls Online, Neverwinter Nights 2: Mask of the Betrayer, Vampire: The Masquerade – Bloodlines, Vampire: The Masquerade – Bloodlines 2
- Brian L. Schmidt – NARC (video game), John Madden Football and many others.
- Garry Schyman – Voyeur, Destroy All Humans!, BioShock, Middle-earth: Shadow of Mordor
- Andrew Sega – Unreal, Unreal Tournament, Freelancer, Crusader series
- Mark Seibert – Quest for Glory series, King's Quest series
- Kazuyuki Sekiguchi - Momotaro Dentetsu series
- Tsuyoshi Sekito – All-Star Pro Wrestling series, Brave Fencer Musashi, Final Fantasy II (WonderSwan Color and Final Fantasy Origins versions), Chrono Trigger (PlayStation version), Romancing SaGa: Minstrel's Song, Final Fantasy VII Advent Children, Teenage Mutant Ninja Turtles III: The Manhattan Project
- Jun Senoue – Sonic the Hedgehog series
- Alex Seropian – Marathon
- Russell Shaw – Dungeon Keeper, Syndicate, Fable and Fable 2
- Laura Shigihara – To The Moon, Finding Paradise, Plants vs. Zombies, Rakuen, Quintessence: The Blighted Venom and High School Story
- Go Shiina – Tales, Mr. Driller, The Idolmaster, God Eater series
- Yoko Shimomura – Street Fighter II, Front Mission series, Live-A-Live, Super Mario RPG, Parasite Eve, Legend of Mana, Mario & Luigi series, Kingdom Hearts series, Final Fantasy XV
- Hidenori Shoji - Yakuza / Like a Dragon series, Super Monkey Ball, Super Monkey Ball 2, F-Zero GX, Binary Domain
- Mark Snow – Syphon Filter: The Omega Strain, Syphon Filter: Dark Mirror
- Masayoshi Soken – Mario Hoops 3-on-3, Mario Sports Mix, Final Fantasy XIV, Final Fantasy XVI
- Maribeth Solomon - Sunless Sea, Sunless Skies
- Jeremy Soule – Guild Wars, Harry Potter, The Elder Scrolls, Total Annihilation, series. Secret of Evermore, Neverwinter Nights, Dungeon Siege, Star Wars: Knights of the Old Republic, Prey (2006)
- Christopher Stevens – Syphon Filter 3
- Martin Stig Andersen – Limbo, Inside, Wolfenstein II: The New Colossus
- Mikolai Stroinski – The Vanishing of Ethan Carter, The Witcher 3: Wild Hunt, Sniper Ghost Warrior 3, Gwent: The Witcher Card Game, Thronebreaker: The Witcher Tales, Sniper Ghost Warrior Contracts, Metamorphosis, Chernobylite, Age of Empires 4, Diablo Immortal
- Koichi Sugiyama – Dragon Quest series, E.V.O.: Search for Eden, Shiren the Wanderer series, Hanjuku Hero: Aa, Sekaiyo Hanjukunare...!, Tetris 2 + Bombliss
- Keiichi Suzuki – Mother, EarthBound

== T ==
- Bobby Tahouri – Rise of the Tomb Raider, Marvel's Avengers
- Masafumi Takada – killer7, God Hand, No More Heroes, Earth Defense Force, Danganronpa series
- Yukihide Takekawa – Soul Blazer
- Motoaki Takenouchi – Landstalker, Shining series
- Tommy Tallarico – Advent Rising, Earthworm Jim series (Earthworm Jim 2 on), Spot Goes To Hollywood, MDK, Maximo: Ghosts to Glory, Wild 9
- Hirokazu Tanaka – Balloon Fight, Metroid, Kid Icarus, Mother, EarthBound, Super Mario Land, Dr. Mario, Tetris
- Kohei Tanaka – Paladin's Quest, Lennus II, Xardion, Alundra, Sakura Wars series, Gravity Rush series
- Kumi Tanioka – Final Fantasy XI, Final Fantasy Crystal Chronicles, Code Age Commanders
- Mikko Tarmia – Amnesia: The Dark Descent, The Penumbra Series, Overgrowth
- Tsukasa Tawada – Ihatovo Monogatari, Thoroughbred Breeder (series), Pokémon series, Harvest Moon series
- Jeroen Tel – Cybernoid, Cybernoid II, Eliminator, Turbo Outrun
- Soichi Terada – Ape Escape series (except Ape Escape 2)
- Chance Thomas – Lord of the Rings Online, Left Behind: Eternal Forces, Marvel Ultimate Alliance, X-Men: The Official Game, The Lord of the Rings: War of the Ring, Unreal II: The Awakening
- Chris Tilton – Mercenaries: Playground of Destruction, Black, Assassin's Creed Unity
- Christopher Tin – Civilization IV, Civilization VI
- Magome Togoshi – Air, Clannad, Planetarian: The Reverie of a Little Planet, Tomoyo After: It's a Wonderful Life, Little Busters!
- Kazumi Totaka – Super Mario Land 2, Kaeru no Tame ni Kane wa Naru, Yoshi series, Animal Crossing series, Luigi's Mansion, Pikmin 2, Wii Sports
- Yuka Tsujiyoko – Fire Emblem series, Paper Mario, Paper Mario: The Thousand-Year Door
- Tsunku - Rhythm Heaven series
- Brian Tyler - Lego Universe, Call of Duty: Modern Warfare 3, Need for Speed: The Run, Far Cry 3, Army of Two: The Devil's Cartel, Assassin's Creed IV: Black Flag
- Jeff Tymoschuk – James Bond: Nightfire, DeathSpank series, Penny Arcade series, Sleeping Dogs

== U ==
- Matt Uelmen – Diablo, Diablo II, StarCraft, World of Warcraft
- Tatsuya Uemura – Performan, Tiger-Heli, Flying Shark, Twin Cobra, Hellfire, Zero Wing, Out Zone, Dogyuun
- Nobuo Uematsu – Final Fantasy series, Hanjuku Hero series, Makaitoushi SaGa, SaGa 2: Hihou Densetsu, Chrono Trigger, Front Mission: Gun Hazard, Blue Dragon, Lost Odyssey, Super Smash Bros. Brawl (Main Theme), The Last Story, Terra Battle, Fantasian
- Ryu Umemoto – Yu-no, EVE Burst Error, Akai Katana

== V ==
- Jan Valta – Kingdom Come: Deliverance, Kingdom Come: Deliverance II series
- Michiel van den Bos – Unreal, Age of Wonders, Unreal Tournament, Deus Ex, Overlord
- Jeff van Dyck – Audio Director of The Creative Assembly (Total War franchise), Electronic Arts sports games (e.g. Need for Speed)
- Cris Velasco – Hellgate: London, God of War, Mass Effect 3, ZombiU
- Neil D. Voss – Tetrisphere, The New Tetris, Racing Gears Advance and others.
- Rich Vreeland – Puzzle Agent, Drawn to Life: The Next Chapter, Fez, Runner 2, Hyper Light Drifter
- Chris Vrenna – American McGee's Alice, Doom 3, Quake 4

== W ==
- Jph Wacheski
- Hajime Wakai – Star Fox 64, Pikmin series, The Legend of Zelda series, Nintendogs
- Jack Wall – Splinter Cell: Pandora Tomorrow, Myst III: Exile, Myst IV: Revelation, Jade Empire, Mass Effect series
- Guy Whitmore – Blood, Claw, Die Hard: Nakatomi Plaza, Shivers, No One Lives Forever
- David Whittaker – many Atari 8-bit, C64, and Amiga games, including Amaurote, BMX Simulator, Colony, Grand Prix Simulator, Panther, Speedball, Shadow of the Beast and Obliterator
- Austin Wintory - Journey, flOw, Monaco: What's Yours is Mine, Tooth and Tail, Assassin's Creed Syndicate, Abzu
- David Wise – All NES games by Rare, Donkey Kong Country series, Diddy Kong Racing, Jet Force Gemini, Star Fox Adventures, Wizards and Warriors series
- Jezz Woodroffe - Composed music to the two Horror Soft titles Elvira II: The Jaws of Cerberus with Philip Nixon, and Waxworks.
- Tim Wright – Welsh composer who goes by the name CoLD SToRAGE, known for his work on Shadow of the Beast II, Shadow of the Beast III, Agony, Lemmings, Wipeout and Colony Wars

== Y ==
- Ippo Yamada - Mega Man series, Azure Striker Gunvolt series, Gal Gun series
- Kenji Yamamoto – Dragon Ball Z: Super Butōden 1, 2, & 3 (#1: with Kumagorou; #2: with Switch-E, Kumatarou; #3: with Amayang, Chatrasch, Switch-E), Dragon Ball Z: Super Goku Den 1 & 2, Dragon Ball Z: Ultimate Battle 22, Dragon Ball Z: The Legend, Dragon Ball: Final Bout, Dragon Ball Z: Budokai 1, 2, & 3, Dragon Ball Z: Shin Budokai 1 & 2, Dragon Ball Z: Harukanaru Goku Densetsu, Dragon Ball Z: Burst Limit, Dragon Ball Z: Infinite World.
- Kenji Yamamoto – Metroid series, Famicom Wars, Famicom Detective Club: The Girl Who Stands Behind, Donkey Kong Country Returns
- Michiru Yamane – Twinbee (NES), Castlevania series, Gungage, Suikoden III, Suikoden IV, Bloodstained: Ritual of the Night
- Akira Yamaoka – Silent Hill series, Contra: Shattered Soldier
- Kinuyo Yamashita – Castlevania, Esper Dream, Arumana no Kiseki, Stinger, Maze of Galious, Mega Man X3, Medabot, Bass Masters Classic, Power Rangers: Lightspeed Rescue, WWF WrestleMania 2000, Buffy the Vampire Slayer, Croc 2, Monsters, Inc., WWF Road to WrestleMania, Power Rangers: Dino Thunder, Keitai Denjū Telefang
- Mahito Yokota – Donkey Kong Jungle Beat, Super Mario series, The Legend of Zelda: Skyward Sword, Captain Toad: Treasure Tracker
- Kenneth Young – Media Molecule, London Studio : LittleBigPlanet series, Tearaway series, Astro Bot series
- Yes - Homeworld

== Z ==
- Hans Zimmer – Ashfall, Call of Duty: Modern Warfare 2, Crysis 2, Dragon Age: The Veilguard, FIFA 19
- ZUN – Touhou
- Zuntata (Taito's sound team)
- Inon Zur – Dragon Age, EverQuest, Fallout, Prince of Persia, Star Trek, Syberia series. Crysis, Crysis Warhead, The Elder Scrolls: Blades, The Elder Scrolls Online, Icewind Dale II, Lineage II, Lord of the Rings: War in the North, Neverwinter Nights, Starfield

== See also ==
- OverClocked ReMix
