= Space Storm =

2009 video game

- Developer: Dava Consulting LLC.
- Publisher: Dava Consulting LLC.
- Platforms: Apple iOS, Android
- Release: October 10, 2009
- Genre: Shoot 'em up
- Mode: Single-player

Space Storm – a side-scrolling shooting video game of the Shot ‘em up genre developed by the American studio DAVA Consulting LLC for the iPhone platform in 2008. Since its release for Apple's iPhone, iPad and iPod Touch devices, over a million of copies of the game have been purchased.

== Game Play ==
A player runs a space ship loaded with different weapons. The ship can fly both vertically and horizontally within the borders of the game screen. At the beginning of each level the space is empty but during the flight certain enemy ships and obstacles appear on the screen. Enemies can fly freely on the screen making tricks and special moves. The purpose of the game is to kill as many enemy objects as possible, including asteroids. After a certain number of enemy objects is destroyed a player gets different bonuses, i.e. healing packs, weapons upgrades, double-power packs, etc. When the enemies are eliminated on the level, a player jumps to the next level. After completing every three levels you'll meet a super-boss on your way – an enemy super space ship with tricky weapons and fight behavior. The game offers many guns from common machine gun to plasma gun and ion shell. Homing missiles find targets themselves and help annihilate super tricky enemies.

== Controls ==
The game provides with joystick control of a space ship, without blocking too much of the screen. The virtual joystick is made in the form of a Virtual Analog Stick located in the lower left part of the screen and doesn't disturb a player when flying around. Virtual Fire button is located in the lower right corner of the screen. All of the control options suffer from the lack of tactile feedback of having a real control stick or pad under the player's thumb. But they don't all force the player's thumb to cover the same amount of screen space.

== Similar Games ==
- 1942 by Capcom
- Star Soldier by Hudson Soft
- Raptor: Call of the Shadows by Cygnus Studios (later Mountain King Studios)
- Tyrian by Eclipse Productions (later World Tree Games)
