= Racing Gears Advance =

2004 video game

- European box art
- Developer: Orbital Media
- Publishers: NA: Orbital Media; EU: Zoo Digital Publishing
- Composer: Neil Voss
- Platform: Game Boy Advance
- Release: PAL: December 17, 2004; NA: February 8, 2005
- Genre: Racing video game
- Modes: Single-player, multiplayer

Racing Gears Advance is a combat racing game for the Game Boy Advance system released in 2004 and includes licensed vehicles from GM, Dodge, Mitsubishi and Lotus Cars.

The soundtrack is notable for having been composed by Neil Voss, known for his prior work on Tetrisphere and The New Tetris.

All circuit cups (there are five total) take the name of letters from the Greek alphabet (Alpha, Gamma, Delta, Epsilon, Omega), with each cup having five tracks (25 tracks total).

Characters such as Spacewave, Jack Speed, Throttle, etc., drive the following cars:

- Cadillac Cien
- Chevrolet Corvette
- Chevrolet SSR
- Dodge Viper
- Dodge M80
- Dodge Super 8 Hemi
- Hummer H2
- Lotus Esprit
- Lotus Exige
- Lotus Elise
- Lotus 340R
- Mitsubishi RPM 7000

Due to its success, a sequel was announced for Nintendo DS under the working title Racing Gears DS, but was later cancelled.

== Reception ==
Racing Gears Advance received positive reviews from critics. On Metacritic, the game holds a score of 83/100 based on 17 reviews.

Alex Navarro of GameSpot gave the game 8.5/10 while praising its controls, vehicle upgrades, and multiplayer. Craig Harris of IGN was similarly positive towards the game, giving it 8.9/10 and praising almost everything about the game except for its inability to save records for the player's best lap and race times.
