= Richard Ludlow =

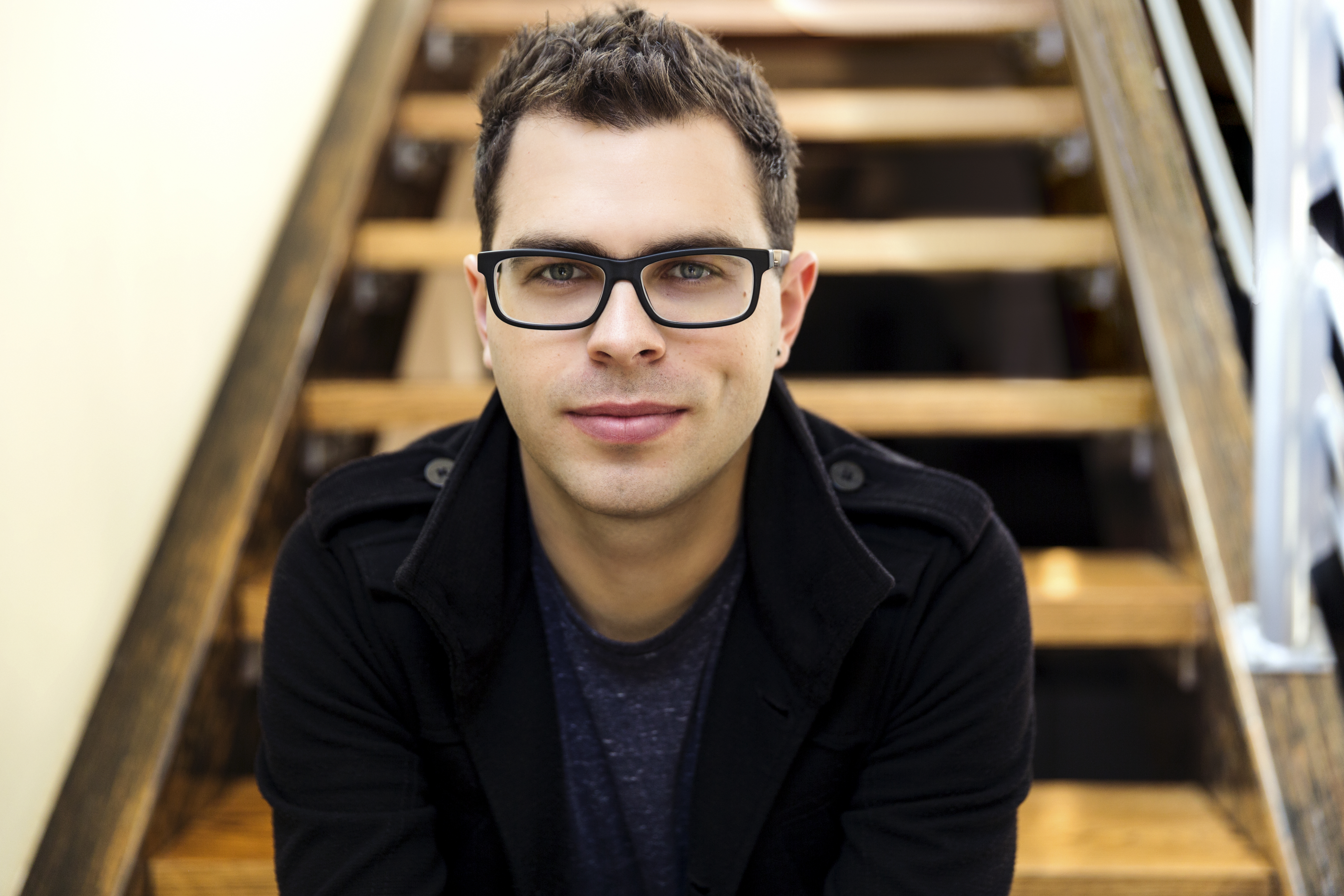

Background information
- Genres: Video games
- Occupations: Audio Director, Sound Designer, Music Producer, Voice Director
- Instruments: Violin, viola
- Years active: 2012–present

Richard Ludlow is an American video game audio director, sound designer, music producer, and voice director, best known for his work on Disney Infinity, King's Quest, Ring of Elysium and Arena of Valor. He is the founder and co-owner of Hexany Audio. Ludlow was named on the Forbes 30 Under 30 list of 2019 under the Games category.

Ludlow attended Fountain Valley High School in Fountain Valley, California. He studied electronic production and design (EPD) at Berklee College of Music In 2012, Ludlow founded Hexany Audio with three friends at Berklee.

== Career ==
Ludlow is the co-owner and audio director at Hexany Audio, which has audio credits for PlayerUnknown’s Battlegrounds, H1Z1, Arena of Valor, King’s Quest 2015, Ring of Elysium, Into the Stars, Blade Runner: Revelations (VR)., audio producer on film and television projects, including The Cold Light of Day, The Raven, and projects for Fortune 500 brands such as Disney, Coca-Cola, Activision, and Nike.

Ludlow has presented talks on audio for video games at GDC, GDC Europe, GDC Next, GameSoundCon, PAX East, PAX Dev, IndieCade, Gamescom, Casual Connect, the External Development Summit, the Midwest Game Developers Summit, Sigma Play, the Silicon Valley Virtual Reality Expo, MIT, WonderCon, and Berklee College of Music.

Ludlow was nominated for a Hollywood Music in Media Award for Original Score in a Video Game for his work on Moonlight Blade: Moonlight Over the Sea.

== Filmography ==
=== Video games ===
Year	Title	Position	Notes	Source
2012	Family Guy: Back to the Multiverse	Audio Designer		
2013	Disney Infinity	Audio Implementer		
2015	King's Quest	Sound Lead		
2015	Assassin's Creed Syndicate	Audio Producer	Trailer spot	
2016	Into the Stars	Audio Director		
2017	Moonlight Blade: Moonlight Over the Sea	Music Producer	Nominated: Hollywood Music in Media Award for Original Score in a Video Game	
2017	Saint Seiya	Audio Producer		
2017	Ring of Elysium	Voice Producer		
2018	Firewall: Zero Hour	Technical Audio Support		
2018	Rules of Survival	Audio Producer		
2018	Arena of Valor	Audio Producer	Won: Game Audio Network Guild Award for Best Music in a Casual/Social Game: Strike of Kings / Realm of Valor / (aka Arena of Valor)	
2018	H1Z1	Additional Sound Producer		
2018	Gordon Ramsey Alexa Skill	Voice Director		
2018	Playerunknown's Battlegrounds (PUBG) Mobile	Sound Producer		
2018	Just Shapes & Beats	Sound Producer		
2018	Overwatch Contenders Tournament	Music Producer		

=== Film ===
Year	Title	Position	Notes	Source
2012	The Raven	Music Copyist		
2012	The Cold Light of Day	Music Copyist		
2016	Beep: A Documentary History of Game Sound	Himself	Documentary	
