= XDS =

XDS could refer to:

- Cross Enterprise Document Sharing, a system for sharing clinical documents between healthcare institutions
- Direct Save Protocol, a feature of the X Window System graphical user interface for Unix-like computer operating systems
- Envoy discovery services, see Cloud Native Computing Foundation § Envoy
- Extended Data Services, a US standard for TV metadata transmission
- External Development Summit, an event for the video game industry
- Ottawa station, train station in Ottawa, Ontario, Canada with IATA code XDS used by Air France–KLM's connecting bus service
- Springfield Armory XD-S, a pistol sold in the United States designed for concealed carry
- X-ray diffuse scattering, a materials analysis technique
- X-Digital Systems satellite subcarrier audio format
- Xerox Data Systems, the name for Scientific Data Systems after it was purchased by Xerox Corporation
