= Xenophage =

Xenophage may refer to:

- An organism involved in xenophagy, changes in established patterns of biological consumption, by individuals or groups
- Xenophage: Alien Bloodsport, a fighting game written for DOS
- Xenophage (comics), a sentient alien monster and an enemy of Venom in the Marvel Universe
- "Xenophage", an exotic machine gun from the video game Destiny 2
