= Wrack (video game) =

2014 video game

- Developer: Final Boss Entertainment
- Publisher: Final Boss Entertainment
- Director: Brad Carney
- Designers: Brad Carney; Remco Ernst; Jack Love; Albert Ivanov; Hani J Jun Choi; Denis Lonin; Maxime Lebled; Brett Harrell; Peter Gromov
- Programmer: Brad Carney
- Artists: Remco Ernst; Jack Love
- Writer: Brad Carney
- Composer: Bobby Prince
- Engine: WrackEd
- Platform: Windows
- Release: Windows: WW: September 30, 2014
- Genre: First-person shooter
- Mode: Single-player

Wrack is a single-player, cel shaded first-person shooter video game developed and published by Final Boss Entertainment for Microsoft Windows. The full release of the game was on September 30, 2014. The game was mostly inspired by games such as Doom and Mega Man.

== Gameplay ==
Wrack is a single-player, cel shaded first person shooter where the player takes control of the protagonist named Kain from a first-person perspective. The player has to fight through many levels of aliens and cyborgs in a science fiction scenario. The game is structured in chapters, where the player has to activate switches to proceed to the next room and every chapter includes one boss battle. The design is mostly comparable with Doom, where in every level are health, armor, ammo, secrets and new weapons to find. The protagonist can carry every weapon and doesn't have to reload. The game also includes a kill chain system where by how many enemies you kill in a short time can enable your weapons perform a special attack. After taking damage, health and armor can be regained by finding health packs and armor throughout the level. The enemies in the game vary in their attacks: some shoot projectiles, other use melee attacks or kamikaze. Next to the first person shooter parts the game also has some small platforming and puzzle parts. The game employs a save system that gives you lives. In the beginning you will get three lives and through the levels the protagonist can earn extra lives by earning points or picking up an extra life pickup. Throughout the game offer checkpoints. After you lose lives the protagonist has to start the level all over again from the beginning of the level.

== Plot ==
In the year 2052 the world has found a way to make infinite resources. Thanks to this the world has demilitarized because they don't need armies to protect themselves from wars. Kain, a wracketeer, is sure something bad is going to happen thanks to this. Kain is right, because shortly after the world gets attacked by the Arcturans. Aliens, who want to conquer the world. It is Kain's mission to stop the Arcturans conquering the world.

== Development ==
Brad Carney started development of the game in 2008 on his own WrackEd game engine. The game was initially called Project Vega, then The Last Bastion, before finally being titled Wrack. The title of The Last Bastion was changed to Wrack to avoid confusion with the similarly titled indie game Bastion. Carney wanted to avoid potential copyright claim issues and also believed Wrack was an easier name to remember. His reasoning toward developing the game was his belief that the presence of Doom-like shooters were missing during that time from the gaming market. Carney later stopped the project and worked at other game development studios. When he resumed work on Wrack, he had to get it through Steam Greenlight. The game was eventually greenlit and went on to Steam as an Early Access title. As he continued to work on Wrack, he hired other artists and developers to help him. He asked Bobby Prince, who composed for Doom and Duke Nukem 3D, to provide the game's score and sound design in what would be his final work as a game composer before his death in 2026. On September 30, 2014 the game moved out of the Early Access phase.

== Reception ==
Metacritic, a review aggregator, rated it 68/100 based on four reviews.
