= Karen Crowther =

American computer game designer and programmer

Karen Chun (previously Karen Crowther) is an American computer game designer and programmer. The president of Redwood Games, she has created educational games including Math Rescue, Word Rescue, as well as the game Pickle Wars.

== Education and early career ==
Chun graduated from the University of California, Davis with a degree in engineering. She worked in the solar energy field and as a mechanical engineer before becoming a programmer. She began programming games for her children, then moved her focus to making educational and non-violent games for kids.

== Games and shareware career ==
Her first widely-sold game was Talking ABC's, which was distributed by Apogee Software. She created the educational computer games Math Rescue and Word Rescue, published under Apogee, as well as the shareware platformer Pickle Wars, published by MVP Software.

In 1994, she was a spokesperson for various shareware game groups when the United States Congress was developing a rating system for video games. She represented the Association of Shareware Professionals, the Educational Software Cooperative, Shareware Trade Association and Resources, and the Association of Shareware Authors and Distributors during talks about the rating system, which included discussions with the Software Publishers Association.

In the 1990s, she was part of the steering committee that founded the International Game Developers Network.

Her company, Redwood Games, was created around 1990. Named after the Redwood Trees of Mendocino, California, the company is now located on Maui.
