= Kenichi Ōkuma =

Japanese musician (1966–2022)

- Born: 7 March 1966; Koshigaya, Saitama, Japan
- Died: 22 July 2022 (aged 56)
- Occupations: Composer, musician
- Years active: 1991–2022

Kenichi Ōkuma (Japanese: 大熊謙一, Hepburn: Ōkuma Kenichi, 7 March 1966 – 22 July 2022), also known as Kenichi Okuma, Kenichi Ohkuma, Kenichi Ookuma, or Ken-ichi Ookuma, was a Japanese video game music composer, sound designer and musician. On July 22nd 2022, he died of esophageal cancer.

== Video games ==
- Sengoku no Hasha: Tenka Fubu he no Michi (1995) Super Famicom
- Poi Poi Ninja World (1996) Super Famicom
- Ring ni Kakero (1998) Super Famicom
- Mystic Ark: Maboroshi Gekijou (1998) PlayStation (with Makoto Asai, Yuichiro Honda, Masaki Takimoto)
- Langrisser V: The End of Legend (1998)
- Super Smash Bros. Brawl (2008) Wii – Composer of "Flat Zone 2", "Pokémon Gym/Evolution" and "Gyromite"
- Super Smash Bros. for Nintendo 3DS and Wii U (2014) 3DS and Wii U – "Flat Zone 2", "Pokémon Gym/Evolution" and "Gyromite", reused from Brawl.
- Super Smash Bros. Ultimate (2018) Switch – "Flat Zone 2", "Pokémon Gym/Evolution" and "Gyromite", reused from Brawl.

== See also ==
- List of video game musicians
