= Pickle Wars =

- Developer: Redwood Games
- Publisher: MVP Software
- Release: 1993
- Genre: Platformer

Pickle Wars is an MS-DOS platform game created in 1993 by Karen Crowther through Redwood Games and published by MVP Software. A planet gets invaded by pickles. The player (alternating between playing a man and a woman) goes on a journey to find hidden weapons. The player needs to collect all the SaladShooters in the level to pass through the exit door. The player can then shoot salad at the aliens, and the aliens will faint. Junk food and pickles are collectible for points, and carrots are for health. The game features music by Bobby Prince.

There are three episodes. The first, "Invasion of the Pickle People", was released as shareware. The other two episodes were purchasable.

== Plot ==
=== Episode I: Invasion of the Pickle People ===
The peaceful planet of Arcadia, inhabited by humans, is attacked by pickles who want to take over the planet. Arcadia has no weapons because there has not been any need for centuries. It becomes Dave's quest to go and find a hidden "Depository" of weapons. He finds an old crazy man named Lord Geric who knows of a doomsday device. A character named Linda also comes to find hidden weapons, and becomes playable for the second half of the episode. Dave and Linda eventually find all of the secret weapons. The pickles decide to interrogate one of the humans, and grab Linda in a jar before she reveals the information she has found to Dave.

=== Episode II: Escape from the Pickle Planet ===
Linda's escape from the Pickle Planet.

=== Episode III: The Search for the Doomsday Machine ===
The pickles get a hold of the doomsday machine and arm it. Dave and Linda must do their best to save Arcadia.

== Legacy ==
As MVPSoft ended the sale of the game around 2009, they offer the registered game version as freeware download.
