= Sidewinder (Mastertronic video game) =

1988 video game

- Developer(s): Arcadia Systems
- Publisher(s): Mastertronic
- Platform(s): Amiga, Atari ST, IBM PC
- Release: WW: 1988
- Genre(s): Scrolling shooter
- Mode(s): Single-player

Sidewinder is a vertically scrolling shooter developed by Arcadia Systems and published by Mastertronic in 1988.

== Reception ==
Computer Gaming World's Chuck Miller reported in June 1994 that Raptor: Call of the Shadows was the first action game to be as addictive for him as Sidewinder on the Amiga in 1988.
