= DemonStar =

1998 video game

- Developer: Mountain King Studios
- Publisher: Mountain King Studios
- Composer: Robert C. Prince III
- Platform: Windows
- Release: January 28, 1998
- Genre: Scrolling shooter
- Modes: Single-player, multiplayer

DemonStar is a video game developed by Mountain King Studios and published in 1998. Considered an unofficial sequel to the studio's earlier Raptor: Call of the Shadows, it is a top-down vertically scrolling shooter set in outer space.

== Plot ==
An original DemonStar screenshot, 2-player mission

The player is a test pilot of a prototype starfighter, the RaptorX, launched by the Terran fleet. A space crime organization, known as the Alien Shogunate Xidus Armada, delivered a surprise attack to the Terran Fleet, destroying most of the Raptor fighters in the process. The few prototypes that were away being tested have survived. The player is tasked to battle through the Xidus Armada, destroy their ultimate weapon, codenamed the DemonStar, and conquer the Armada fleet.

== Gameplay ==
DemonStar is a shoot 'em up that features three weapons with levels of increasing power: proton lasers, ion cannons and plasma cannons, that can be side- or rear-mounted. The game features eighteen levels, a two-player local co-operative game mode, and a unlockable level editor.

== Development and release ==
Mountain King Studios was formed by lead developer Scott Host following his departure from Apogee Software to independently develop and self-publish titles. Development of DemonStar was completed by Scott Host and Kevin Blackman.

DemonStar was re-released in 2003 as DemonStar: Secret Missions. Released in two parts, Secret Missions used an enhanced version of the original engine and new music. Each Secret Missions title contains eight new levels.

As a shareware title, DemonStar was packaged among other software, such as the Space Arcade Collection by Greenstreet Software, and Arcade Classics.

== Reception ==
Reception

Review scores
Publication	Score
GameSpot	4.7
PC Zone	61% 82% (Secret Missions)
Gaming Entertainment Monthly	55%

DemonStar received mixed reviews upon release, with reviewers divided on the merits of the simplicity of its gameplay. Positive assessments of the game focused on the addictiveness and intensity of its arcade-style gameplay. In reviewing the Secret Missions version, Stuart Campbell noted the game was a "tough, well-balanced, no-nonsense "shmup" that you can devote the odd blissful, brainless half-hour to."

Many reviewers compared the game to its predecessor, Raptor, and the 1990 arcade video game Raiden. Stuart Campbell of PC Zone stated the game "follows the Raiden design template to a degree that verges on stalking." Gaming Entertainment Monthly assessed that their disappointment with DemonStar was due to high expectations "based on what Raptor offered in the past". Common critiques included the lack of a save feature or a points system to upgrade the player's ship, as had been the case in Raptor.

Negative reviews of DemonStar focused upon the low resolution for a game released in 1998. Richie Shoemaker of PC Zone stated "the viewing window is so tiny...you shouldn't have to switch resolution to enjoy a game". GameSpot acknowledged that the game was an improvement of the resolution of Raptor by running in SVGA, but stated "there's a major trade-off: DemonStar always runs in a window, even (in) the so-called "full screen" mode, which simply crops out your desktop background with metallic textures".

== Remastered version ==
In 2023, a remastered version of the original DemonStar was released. Containing the same levels as the original, its audiovisual presentation was completely revised. The remastered DemonStar features new high resolution graphics, a frame rate of up to 120 fps, a Tate mode for vertical monitors and a new soundtrack composed by the Danish sound artist Pfeffermouse. An optional "Legacy Mode" resembles the graphics of the 1998 DemonStar and features the original soundtrack by Bobby Prince.
