= Word Rescue =

1992 video game

- Developer: Redwood Games
- Publisher: Apogee Software
- Programmer: Karen Crowther
- Artist: Bud Pembroke
- Composer: Voyetra Technologies
- Platforms: MS-DOS; Re-release; Mac, Windows
- Release: March 18, 1992
- Genres: Educational, platform
- Mode: Single-player

Word Rescue is an educational platform game for MS-DOS written by Karen Crowther of Redwood Games and published by Apogee Software in March 1992. It was re-released in 2015 through Steam with support for Windows and Mac. The game also allows the player interact with a pair of Stereoscopic Vision Glasses.

Like most Apogee games, Word Rescue is divided into three episodes, with only the first episode playable in the shareware version.

1. Visit Gruzzleville and the Castle
2. Explore GruzzleBad Caverns
3. See the spooky Haunted House

Apogee still sells the registered version of this game.

A companion game with similar gameplay, Math Rescue, was released in October 1992. A sequel, Word Rescue Plus, was released in 1993.

== Plot ==
The story centers on creatures called "The Gruzzles". Because the Gruzzles cannot read, they steal words out of books, preventing others from reading as well. Playing as a boy or girl, the player must help Benny Bookworm take back all the stolen words and match them with their meanings so he may put them back in the books.

== Gameplay ==
The player moves around the screen in a platform shooter style environment. The player tries to match words with their corresponding pictures, which are located randomly in the level. In addition, the player must avoid both Gruzzles and dangers. Touching them will result in having to start the level over. Once all seven words are matched, Benny Bookworm magically turns the player's collected words into a key, which is used to open the door that takes the player to the next level.

If the player matches a word with the wrong picture, a "Gruzzle" appears. To deal with a Gruzzle the player must press the Space bar to order Benny the Bookworm to pour slime on it. The player only has a limited supply of slime but slime can be replenished by collecting slime buckets or completing the mystery word.

One word from the level is randomly chosen at the beginning of each level to be the mystery word, and the letters of that word are placed in a random order around the level, although the letters are in the same places every time. If the player completes the word by collecting the letters of that word in order, bonus points and full slime are awarded. Bonus points can also be earned by collecting books, sliming Gruzzles and matching words with their pictures.

Depending on the difficulty level, there are also a set number of Gruzzles on each level. The Easy difficulty is easy for young players, as there is only one predetermined Gruzzle in the level. The Hard difficulty, however, often has as many or more Gruzzles as there are words to find and 20 books must be collected to reveal the mystery word.

== Reception ==
Computer Gaming World called Word Rescue and Math Rescue "excellent choices for younger children ... though us older 'kids' will still find them entertaining. They are difficult to keep playing".
