= KGB (video game) =

1992 video game

KGB Conspiracy
- European cover art
- Developer: Cryo Interactive
- Publisher: Virgin Games
- Director: Yves Lamoureux
- Producer: Jean-Martial Lefranc
- Designer: Johan Robson
- Programmer: Yves Lamoureux
- Artists: Michel Rho; Didier Bouchon; Sohor Ty
- Writer: Johan Robson
- Composer: Stéphane Picq
- Platforms: MS-DOS, Amiga
- Release: 1992
- Genre: Adventure
- Mode: Single-player

KGB is a video game released for the Amiga and IBM PC compatibles in 1992. Set in the decadent final days of the Soviet Union, KGB is considered to be quite difficult, even for experienced gamers, since it relies on a real time clock and correct/wrong answers which can end the game immediately or after an event needed to be triggered; also, players may make errors which they will notice only hours later in-game. The game engine, graphics and interface have plenty of similarities with Cryo's Dune.

KGB was also released on CD under the title Conspiracy, which included clips of Rukov's father played by Donald Sutherland giving advice. In the CD version, all references to "KGB" within the game and manual were changed to "Conspiracy".

== Plot ==
The game is set in the summer of 1991. The protagonist, Captain Maksim Mikahilovich Rukov, recently transferred to the Department P from the GRU after three years' duty, is ordered to investigate possible corruption inside the KGB after a former agent turned private eye was found murdered. Rukov finds himself investigating a party hardliner anti-perestroika plot that threatens the life of General Secretary Mikhail Gorbachev.

=== Main characters ===
- Captain Maksim Mikhailovich Rukov was born on 12 January 1966 in Sverdlovsk. His parents, Mikhail Stepanovich Rukov and Svetlava Shailova, were killed on 23 May 1983 during an Afghan terrorist attack in Dushanbe (in the Tajik SSR) where his father was on active duty. Rukov learned English, Arabic and Spanish and joined the Spetsnaz as a paratrooper in 1988. The game begins as he makes his first steps in Department P.
- Uncle Vanya is the brother of Rukov's father. He was also injured in the attack and uses a wheelchair, but is still able to take care of his nephew. He seems very suspicious of Maks's new employers. (The name "Uncle Vanya" is a nod to the play of the same name by Anton Chekhov)
- Major Vovlov is Rukov's direct superior at Department P. He is bad-tempered and authoritarian.
- Colonel Viktor Galushkin works at Department P. He personally knew Rukov's father and went after his assassins.
- Major Radomir Savinkov, also a Department P member, is Rukov's controller in Leningrad. He is highly intelligent.
- Colonel Vladimir Kusnetsov is the head of KGB's Department 7 in Leningrad. He is very hostile to Department P.
- Captain Piotr Chapkin works at Department 7 with his father-in-law, Colonel Kusnetsov.
- Major Grigori Agabekov is second in command at Department 7. He served in Afghanistan. He has a clean record and good reputation.
- Nathaniel Greenberg and Carla Wallace are American CIA agents who happen to be working on the same case as Rukov.

== Reception ==
Reception

Review scores
Publication	Score	
Publication	Amiga	DOS
Adventure Gamers		1.5/5
Amiga Computing	87%	
Amiga Format	91%	
Amiga Power	90%	
Computer and Video Games		73%

Computer Gaming World said in February 1993 that KGB "was very much in the John le Carré mold, with lots of hidden intrigue, deep subterfuge and criss-crossing plot lines. One almost expects George Smiley to turn up". The magazine praised the game's graphics and "unusual feel", and concluded that it was "an engrossing and atmospheric product with more depth and attention to detail than offered by most of the latest graphic adventures". In April 1994 the magazine said of the CD remake, Conspiracy, that although Donald Sutherland's acting was "first-rate" the addition of his scenes to the original game was "a bit strained", concluding that "The novelty of seeing a Big Screen actor in an adventure game is about the only thing going for it".
