= Stargunner =

1996 video game

- Developer: WizardWorks
- Publisher: Apogee Software
- Platforms: MS-DOS, Windows
- Release: November 19, 1996
- Genre: Scrolling shooter
- Mode: Single-player

Stargunner is a horizontally scrolling shooter video game published by Apogee Software in 1996 for MS-DOS and Microsoft Windows. Stargunner was released as freeware on June 22, 2005.

== Gameplay ==
The player controls a flying craft from a side-view perspective. Enemies can approach from in front, from behind, from below or from above. They can be either lone flyers or formation ships.

Many elements are similar to the 1994 Raptor: Call of the Shadows.

== Plot ==
The game has two separate storylines; those being the one described in the official manual included with the CD-ROM copy and the one on the 3D Realms/Apogee website and portrayed in the game itself.

The manual tells of the Barakians who entered Amdaran space in huge carrier ships with the notion of allying with the Amdarans. The peaceful people of Amdara helped the Barakians colonize a nearby planet after which the people of Barak revealed themselves to be a race out for blood and conquest. The Amdarans find themselves in a losing battle, their final hope are the titular Stargunners who are tasked with assaulting key Barak locations and fleets with the hope of crippling the enemy and turning the tide of the war.

The in-game story is about the Zilians planning an assault on the people of Yitima. The Yitimans plan to preemptively strike at key Zilian strongholds before their forces can be mobilized.

== Development ==
According to David Pevreal, Apogee had intended to develop an Amiga version of the game first and then port it to IBM PC compatibles, but those plans were scrapped and only the latter version was released.

The game was programmed in C++. The artwork was done on an Amiga using Deluxe Paint.

Music for the game was composed by Lee Jackson, using FastTracker 2. Coincidentally, Stargunner was released on the anniversary of Jackson's birthday.
