= Neil Voss =

American Video Game composer

Neil Voss (born October 7, 1974) is an American video game composer. His first recognized work was on Tetrisphere for Nintendo 64 in 1997, an acclaimed effort that earned him a "Best Soundtrack" award from Nintendo Power for that year. Later he composed tracks for The New Tetris in 1999, also for Nintendo 64. Voss later moved to working on the Game Boy Advance, producing soundtracks for Racing Gears Advance in collaboration with Orbital Media Inc. Many of his compositions for the Commodore 64 are available in The High Voltage SID Collection.

== Background ==
At the early age of 12, Neil Voss began playing with electronic music on his Commodore 64 and this hobby soon became a big part of his life. He later became an underground electronic music developer, but saw his fellow composers signing to game developers, and so he joined H2O, a third-party developer for Atari's Jaguar. His first project was Phear, but after Jaguar failed, it was moved to Nintendo and expanded into Tetrisphere. As audio director, Voss produced, composed, and engineered the whole soundtrack for Tetrisphere, which some say made the game a hit. Voss went on to create more hit techno music in the N64 puzzle game, The New Tetris. This soundtrack became an instant favorite.

Later, in 2005, Voss worked on Racing Gears Advance for Game Boy Advance. which won for "Best Use of Sound" by IGN.
