= Kult: The Temple of Flying Saucers =

1989 video game

- Developer(s): Exxos, ERE informatique
- Publisher(s): EU: Infogrames; NA: Data East
- Director(s): Johan Robson (as Arbeit von Spacekraft)
- Designer(s): Johan Robson
- Programmer(s): Patrick Dublanchet
- Artist(s): Michel Rho
- Writer(s): Johan Robson
- Composer(s): Stéphane Picq
- Platform(s): Amiga, Atari ST, MS-DOS
- Release: 1989
- Genre(s): Adventure
- Mode(s): Single-player

Title screen (Amiga)

A dialog of choices (Amiga)

Kult: The Temple of Flying Saucers is a graphic adventure published in 1989 by Exxos. The US version was released as Chamber of the Sci-Mutant Priestess.

== Plot ==
The game is set in a post-apocalyptic environment. Society consists of three races: Tuner; who possess psy-powers and Protozorqs; who are physical mutants, and 'Normals', people without mutations.

Raven, a Tuner, is caught prisoner in the temple of the Protozorqs, and must find his girlfriend, who was also kidnapped, to finally proceed to escape with her. Raven is aware that his quest won't be simple since the Protozorqs, armed with "zapsticks", will gladly kill him if he does anything they dislike.

== Ports ==
The Amiga and Atari ST version use digitized sound effects.

The MS-DOS version supports 16-color EGA or Tandy-compatible graphics, 4-color CGA graphics, and 2-color Hercules graphics. Three-voice music is supported on the Tandy.

== Reception ==
Computer Gaming World called the game "an imaginative adventure game" with unusually good graphics and audio. It recommended the game to fans of adventures with puzzles, with the story's short length and abrupt ending the main faults.
