= Into the Stars =

2016 video game

- Developer: Fugitive Games
- Publisher: Iceberg Interactive
- Composers: Jack Wall; Jim Lordeman
- Engine: Unreal Engine 4
- Platform: Microsoft Windows
- Release: WW: March 4, 2016
- Genre: Space combat simulator
- Mode: Single-player

Into the Stars is a space simulator video game developed by Fugitive Games, a development team made up of former EA DICE and Spark Unlimited developers, and published by Iceberg Interactive. Following a successful Kickstarter crowdfunding campaign, the game was greenlit and went into the Steam Early Access program.

The goal of the Into the Stars is to reach the planet of Titus Nova, with one large "capital" spaceship and a limited amount of supplies. In order to achieve this the player must visit other planets to gather resources, negotiate with alien species, and attempt to escape the pursuit of an enemy threat known as the Skorn.

Fugitive Games cited The Oregon Trail and FTL: Faster Than Light among their inspirations for the game.

== Reception ==
On Metacritic, Into the Stars received "mixed or average reviews". Don Saas of GameSpot rated it 6/10 stars. Saas praised the game's graphics, resource management, and the detailed character backgrounds, but he said that the unchanging map limits replayability. He also found the game's difficulty inconsistent and too dependent on punishing random events.
