= Commander Blood =

1994 video game

- Cover art
- Developer: Cryo
- Publisher: Mindscape
- Platform: MS-DOS
- Release: NA: 1994
- Genre: Adventure
- Mode: Single-player

Commander Blood is a science fiction adventure game that was developed by Cryo, a French company that also created Captain Blood (released in 1988). Designed to run on MS-DOS, Commander Blood was released in 1994. The Big Bug Bang, the sequel to Commander Blood, was released in 1996, and was available in French only.

== Plot ==
Bob Morlock, a biomechanical mastermind, is the founder of a massive company called Kanary. Thanks to scientific advances, Morlock is the oldest being in existence. Knowing his time in this universe is nearing an end, he would like to see the Big Bang and the beginning of the universe. Kanary's Clone Consortium branch builds Commander Blood in order to help Morlock achieve his goal. Commander Blood is placed on a high-tech ship, the Ark, and aided by Honk, Blood's onboard computer personality; the ORXX, Blood's biomechanical 'clone'; Olga, Blood's onboard translator; a radio, television set; and other technology.

== Gameplay ==
Communication with the game's characters is carried on clicking on a series of words that serve as topics. Captain Blood utilized UPCOM (an icon-based communication system), while Commander Blood makes use of a multiple-choice conversation system, in which players click through word-choices in order to learn more information. Players traverse both time and space as they enter black holes in the search for the Big Bang.

== Development ==
=== Graphics ===
The game focuses on Commander Blood's interactions with the denizens of the worlds players travel to in search for the Big Bang. Thus, the game makes use of complex FMV sequences that depict orbiting planetary systems, expressive characters, and an onboard television with different channels to watch. The animations of the non-CGI characters were created by performing live action puppeteering in front of a chroma key screen.

=== Sound ===
The game makes use of original scores by the French composers Stephane Picq and Philippe Egret, and the various planetary inhabitants each make distinctive sounds during the game.

== Release ==
A port for the Atari Jaguar CD was announced to be in development by Cryo on the July 1995 issue of online magazine Atari Explorer Online, and although internal documents from Atari Corporation still listed the port as in development, this version was ultimately cancelled in March 1996 after several delays. After the system was declared as an open platform by Hasbro Interactive, it allowed independent publisher and developers to release unfinished titles from the system's past life cycle and a non-playable demo of the Jaguar CD version was released by B&C Computervisions in 2002 as a result.
