= Extase =

1990 video game

- Cover art of Extase
- Developer(s): Cryo
- Publisher(s): Virgin Mastertronic
- Designer(s): Patrick Dublanchet
- Artist(s): Michel Rho
- Composer(s): Philippe Eidel; Arnaud Devos
- Platform(s): Amiga, Atari ST, MS-DOS
- Release: EU: 1990
- Genre(s): Action strategy
- Mode(s): Single-player

Extase is a computer game developed by Cryo and published by Virgin Mastertronic.

== Summary ==
Extase features some puzzles involving a sleeping female android that the player needed to wake up by cleaning its circuit. Each level represented a different level of emotion until the final extase (ecstasy). The gameplay mechanic is based on the "Brain Bowler" minigame in Purple Saturn Day, an 'alien sports' compilation created by the Cryo team under the name ERE and published by Epyx.

The music was designed by Stéphane Picq, and was co-credited to Philippe Eidel, and The Bulgarian Voices. It punctuated each action of the player or each event, becoming gradually richer until the level was finally completed.

== Critical reception ==
Ace Magazine wrote that the game was highly original, though noted it is one players would either love or hate. Amiga Format described the game as a "musical masterpiece" and "graphic extravaganza".

== Legacy ==
The sleeping female android later became the mascot for Cryo Interactive, and appeared in their many logos.
