= Dune (video game) =

1992 video game

- Developer: Cryo Interactive
- Publisher: Virgin Games
- Director: Rémi Herbulot
- Producers: Stephen Clarke-Willson; David A. Luehmann; David Bishop
- Programmers: Rémi Herbulot; Patrick Dublanchet
- Artists: Jean-Jacques Chaubin; Didier Bouchon; Sohor Ty
- Composers: Stéphane Picq, Philippe Ulrich
- Platforms: MS-DOS, Amiga, Sega CD
- Release: 1992 (DOS, Amiga); 1993 (Sega CD)
- Genres: Adventure, strategy
- Mode: Single-player

Dune is a 1992 adventure strategy game based on the 1965 science-fiction novel of the same name by Frank Herbert. It was developed by Cryo Interactive and published by Virgin Interactive.

Dune blends adventure with economic and military strategy. Loosely following the story of the novel, the game casts the player as Paul Atreides, with the ultimate goal of driving the House Harkonnen from the planet Arrakis, while managing spice extraction, military, and, later, ecology through the native Fremen tribes. As the player progresses, his troops are equipped with weapons from "crysknives" to atomics, tap into Paul's latent psychic powers, and get acquainted with such characters from the novel as Chani and Liet-Kynes.

Released for the Amiga and IBM PC compatibles, it was one of the first floppy games to be converted to CD format, which included footage of the David Lynch film, voice-acting for all speaking roles, and improved 3D-rendered traveling and location screens. This version, a mix of the Amiga graphics and the extras of the PC-CD version, was also released on the Sega CD / Mega CD console. The audio track, created by Stéphane Picq and Philip Ulrich, was released by Cryo (formerly Exxos) on the album Dune: Spice Opera.

It was followed the same year by Dune II, which ultimately set the standard for the genre of real-time strategy video games.

== Gameplay ==
PC screenshot (floppy version)

Dune combines elements of real-time strategy and adventure games. The player assumes the role of Paul Atreides, son of Duke Leto Atreides and Lady Jessica, as House Atreides takes control of the desert planet Arrakis at the Emperor Shaddam IV's request. The family's goal is to mine the valuable spice melange while forging alliances with the native Fremen to resist the rival House Harkonnen.

The game is presented entirely through Paul's perspective, blending strategic resource management with narrative-driven exploration. Conversations with characters advance the story and provide information on spice production, military strength, or Harkonnen activity. Some dialogues include limited choices that can influence the outcome of certain interactions.

=== Game Structure ===
Dune features two interwoven layers:

- Adventure layer – A first-person interface used to explore locations such as the palace at Arrakeen, Fremen sietches, and open desert. Travel between sietches is conducted by Ornithopter, with points of interest spotted en route and added to the world map.
- Strategy layer – A top-down planetary map where Paul can direct spice-mining operations, manage Fremen tribes, and later train military forces. Time in the game passes continuously and affects both layers equally.

The game begins with Paul exploring the Arrakeen palace and meeting allies such as Duncan Idaho and Gurney Halleck. Early tasks include visiting Fremen tribes to recruit them for spice harvesting. Once a tribe agrees to join House Atreides, it can be assigned mining duties, collect equipment, or prospect for new spice fields. Spice collected is automatically stored at Arrakeen.

=== Resource and Military Management ===
Balancing spice production and military readiness is critical. The Emperor regularly demands spice shipments, which must be approved at the palace within a set time limit. Failure to meet these demands results in an Atreides defeat. Duncan Idaho can send smaller or larger shipments to manipulate the frequency of these requests. Spice also acts as currency to purchase mining and military equipment from Smugglers.

Harkonnen raids become more frequent as the game progresses, eventually leading to the capture of Fremen tribes and Duke Leto's scripted death. This event shifts the game toward military conquest. Paul must then recruit and train Fremen warriors, equip them with weapons, and attack Harkonnen fortresses. Gurney can be stationed at sietches to boost troop morale and combat skill. Battles are influenced by troop numbers, equipment quality, morale, and Paul's presence on the battlefield.

=== Alternative Strategy: Terraforming ===
An alternate path to victory involves terraforming Arrakis with the aid of Liet-Kynes and the Fremen. Ecology teams plant vegetation and build wind traps to store water, which boosts morale but eliminates spice in affected areas. As vegetation spreads, the Harkonnen may abandon fortresses without combat. While slower and economically risky, terraforming can complement military efforts.

=== Progression and Abilities ===
As the story advances, Paul develops telepathic abilities, enabling him to sense palace messages, issue remote commands to Fremen tribes, and eventually control all forces across the planet. He also learns to ride sandworms, offering faster and safer travel than Ornithopters.

The game's narrative evolves dynamically alongside these mechanics. Early exploration transitions into large-scale strategy as Paul gains the trust of the Fremen and becomes their leader. The ultimate objective is to capture or neutralize all Harkonnen strongholds, culminating in a final assault on their palace near Arrakeen.

Gurney and a Fremen inside a sietch (Sega Mega-CD)

=== Time and Victory Conditions ===
The passage of time is crucial; spice fields deplete, morale fluctuates, and delays in shipments invite imperial retaliation. Victory requires careful balance between mining, diplomacy, and military campaigns. A final push with a massive Fremen army against the Harkonnen palace concludes the game.

== Development ==
=== Groundwork ===
Martin Alper, the founder of Mastertronic (later renamed Virgin Interactive), was fascinated by the novel Dune and had been trying to buy the interactive adaptation rights since 1988. He conducted a study to measure the viability of such an adaptation, estimating that there were between 3 and 4 million fans of the novel in the United States. He found that Dino De Laurentiis, the producer of David Lynch's film Dune, held the adaptation rights. Following the release of the film, the production company had gone bankrupt. After the death of Frank Herbert, there were several legal trials to determine who then owned the rights. Martin Alper was finally able to buy the rights from Universal Pictures in the spring of 1990.

The first links between the future French company Cryo Interactive, born out of the ashes of ERE Informatique and Virgin Interactive were forged when Philippe Ulrich met Jean-Martial Lefranc, recently appointed director of Virgin Loisirs by Patrick Zelnik. Lefranc was an admirer of Ulrich's team, especially for its recent release of Captain Blood, for which Ulrich was scenario designer. On 20 July 1990, he organized a meeting between Frank Herman, head of the group in London and Ulrich's team. Herman promised them a meeting with Martin Alper, president of Virgin Games USA.

Rémi Herbulot met with Martin Alper in Los Angeles to pitch three video games, all with strong science fiction elements. In response, Alper proposed to Herbulot the idea of adapting the Dune novel to a video game format, as he held those rights. The rights agreement between the groups was finalized in August 1990, during a dinner at Fouquet's, in the presence of Philippe Ulrich and Frank Herman.

=== Pre-production ===
A team of developers, mostly Frank Herbert fans, began to work on the project. The team worked for 6 months on paper and organized weekly meetings. Ulrich met the game's producer, David Bishop, of whom he had heard conflicting reports in the past. Bishop expressed his desire to design the game himself. In the first few months of development, the documents that the developers sent to the United States did not convince Virgin. Communication was relayed through Bishop in London, who did not defend the project. The Americans at Virgin Games criticized the game for its "French aesthetic" and too-prominent user interface. They also were not convinced that the proposed mixture of adventure and strategy gameplay elements would succeed.

To give the development team a more defined framework, Philippe Ulrich created a new label within Virgin Interactive: Cryo Entertainment.

=== Trouble ===
On 19 September 1990, after a change in management, Virgin threatened to cancel the production. No contract had yet been signed; the developers feared all their work would be lost.

Frank Herman managed to salvage the project, but the American backers, including Martin Alper, pulled out. Alper entrusted the electronic adaptation rights of Dune to an American studio, Westwood Studios, at a meeting in Las Vegas.

The developers, working on the game practically in secret, ended up with a design document more than 100 pages long.

The game was inspired by the novel by Frank Herbert, but also by David Lynch's film. Feyd-Rautha, for example, retained the likeness of Sting, and Paul Atreides retained the likeness of Kyle MacLachlan. Most of the other characters also retained the likeness of their film actors. Also adapted from the film is the "weirding module", a weapon that does not exist in the novel. The graphics were created for VGA 256 color mode. In early 1991, the Gulf War seemed to echo the themes of Dune and Ulrich was inspired to integrate images recalling the night bombing of Baghdad into the game.

In April 1991, Sega bought Virgin's European operations and Cryo lost Jean-Martial Lefranc, its intermediary with the publisher's general management. Their new manager, Christian Brecheteau, discovered that Virgin Entertainment had financed Cryo in secret, but fortunately expressed interest in the project. An audit of the accounts of Sega France, which absorbed Virgin Loisirs, was carried out. Management now realized that the development of Dune in France was still being funded, while Sega had not obtained the Dune license.

Members of the Cryo team rushed to London to meet with Martin Alper to present their work samples and hopefully save the project. Alper and Bishop were excited by the early prototypes and they reversed their cancellation decision, despite still having another Dune project under development. They gave Cryo five weeks to present a prototype able to satisfy the American public.

The plot was modified from the novel and the developers chose to start the game with the arrival of Paul on Arrakis. A few weeks later, they sent a prototype to the United States. Alper was impressed not only by the game but also by the soundtrack, which he wanted to release on CD. In September 1991, he signed the game Dune and a second game, KGB, which Ulrich had proposed to him at the European Computer Trade Show in London in 1990. In October, the game was in pre-beta, with a demo version planned. On 27 September, Virgin Games USA signed an agreement with Sega for an adaptation of Dune for Mega-CD.

=== Aftermath ===
In January 1992, after this comeback, Ulrich, Herbulot and Lefranc spun off Cryo Interactive as an independent company. Cryo's Dune arrived in stores before Westwood's game, which was eventually renamed Dune II. The development of Dune cost 3 million francs, of which 800,000 was used by Cryo. With the signing of the distribution contract, Cryo was granted a budget of 600,000 francs.

Cryo planned a number of ports, to Atari ST, Amiga, CD32, Super NES and possibly the NES and Master System. Most never saw the light of day, although the game was successfully ported to the Amiga and Sega CD. Philippe Ulrich also planned a sequel to the game, which this time would place the player on the side of the Harkonnens.

Dune was one of the first floppy disk games to be ported to the new CD format. This was thanks to Ulrich's willingness to exploit this new medium, despite initial opposition from David Bishop. The Sega Mega-CD version had graphics close to the Amiga version's, but offered the extras of the DOS CD-ROM version: snippets from Lynch's film, voice acting and new travelling animations.

A July–August 1993 report in French magazine Mega Force documented the production of the Mega-CD conversion. Rémi Herbulot oversaw the project and programming, while Patrick Dublanchet was responsible for adapting the game to Sega's hardware. Herbulot's wife Danielle contributed to the French dialogue and the synchronisation of spoken lines with the characters' on-screen movements. The magazine also identified Jean-Jacques Chaubin as a graphics artist, Didier Bouchon as an exterior designer and Stéphane Picq as the composer.

Mega placed the game at No. 10 in their Top Mega CD Games of All Time.

== Audio ==
Sound track

Dune: Spice Opera was released by Virgin Records in 1992. The tracks were composed by Stéphane Picq and Philippe Ulrich. Virgin Records was later sold to EMI, which then became the new holders of the copyright. Picq wished to have the rights in order to re-release the album, though they were not granted.

In 2023, Stéphane Picq announced a remaster and re-release of the game's original soundtrack, in digital lossless .FLAC format, to be titled Dune Spice Opera 2024.

Track list
No.	Title	Length
1.	"Spice Opera"	4:47
2.	"Emotion Control"	4:19
3.	"Ecolove"	5:01
4.	"Water"	3:05
5.	"Revelation"	6:00
6.	"Free Men"	6:37
7.	"Wake Up"	5:15
8.	"Dune Theme"	5:07
9.	"Chani's Eyes"	5:03
10.	"Sign of the Worm"	3:15
11.	"Too"	4:35
12.	"Dune Variation"	6:20
13.	"Cryogenia"	4:46
Total length:		64:10

== Reception ==
Dune was commercially successful, with sales of 20,000 units in its first week alone. By 1997, it had sold 300,000 units. Cryo Interactive's Philippe Ulrich later noted that the company had "bet a lot on the explosion of the PC and the CD-ROM" with Dune, and that the game's hit status was heavily responsible for Cryo's quick growth.

Maxwell Eden for Computer Gaming World wrote in September 1992 that the developer "had succeeded in distilling the book's complex plot into a game that involves the player in the outcome". It praised the graphics and animation, and concluded that the game was "a light and interesting challenge" easy enough for most players to finish. In April 1994 the magazine said of the CD version that "many of the actors come off better on the PC screen than they fared in the real cinema, and the addition of digitized speech spices up many of the dull parts of the game". QuestBusters wrote: "I really enjoyed this game, a high quality product with many surprisingly entertaining aspects". Because of the strategic aspects it recommended the game to those who enjoyed both strategy games and graphic adventures. Electronic Gaming Monthly gave the Sega CD version an 8 out of 10, describing it as "involving", and praising the digitized graphics and flight sequences.

Jim Trunzo reviewed Dune in White Wolf #34 (Jan./Feb., 1993), rating it a 3 out of 5 and stated that "Dune, from Virgin Games, should please fans of Frank Herbert's classic; the game brings the book's characters and places to life. However, for those who believe that 'the game's the thing,' you might end up feeling like someone who's had the appetizer and is left waiting for the main course."

== Later games ==
In 1992 software company Westwood Studios produced a sequel to Dune also for Virgin Interactive, Dune II: The Building of a Dynasty. Westwood later produced two more games, a remake, Dune 2000 in 1998 and its sequel Emperor: Battle for Dune in 2001. Cryo returned to the Dune universe in 2001 with Frank Herbert's Dune, the financial failure of which bankrupted Cryo Interactive, causing the nearly finished Dune Generations to never be released.
