= Raptor: Call of the Shadows =

1994 video game

- Developer: Cygnus Studios
- Publisher: Apogee Software
- Designer: Jim Molinets
- Programmers: Scott Host; Paul Radek
- Artists: Rich Fleider; Tim Neveu
- Composer: Matt Murphy
- Platforms: MS-DOS, Windows, Linux, iOS, Mac OS
- Release: April 1, 1994 (MS-DOS); January 29, 2011 (Mac)
- Genre: Scrolling shooter
- Mode: Single-player

Raptor: Call of the Shadows is a vertically scrolling shooter developed by Cygnus Studios and published by Apogee Software. Its working title was "Mercenary 2029". It was released on April 1, 1994 for MS-DOS compatible systems. The first episode of the game, "Bravo Sector", was distributed as shareware, while the other two episodes were sold commercially.

== Plot ==
The game sees a mercenary flying the advanced Raptor, along with being sent on interplanetary missions to destroy the top competitors of MegaCorps.

== Episodes ==
Wave 4 of Bravo Sector

The game is divided into three "sectors": Bravo Sector, Tango Sector, and Outer Regions, all of which have sub-missions called "waves", making for a total of 27 levels (9 per sector). The full version of Raptor allows players to start out in any of the three campaigns, though playing them in order helps the player to more easily accumulate money for weapon and shield upgrades.

Once a player beats a sector, they can replay it with all the money and weapons that they have accumulated. The difficulty is increased when the player does this however, e.g. if the player beats the sector on Rookie and replays it, the difficulty will be set to Veteran.

The Bravo Sector is the most "generic" episode, with few features distinguishing each level. Starting at the coast and then moving inland, most of the targets are military bases and installations, and much of the terrain is barren land, with the occasional forests and rivers. Large oil silos feature prominently in the early waves, and a refinery (tank farm) is found in the second-last wave. In the final wave, the player flies offshore to destroy the Lithos Petroleum rig, but there is no background on why Lithos is the enemy, other than being suggested as a competitor of MegaCorps.

The Tango Sector is more distinctive, with each level following a different theme. These include a large water/chemical plant, farmland, jungle, city, and airbase. At the end, in the jungle after destroying an ancient temple, the player has to defeat a huge aircraft which splits into three modules.

In Outer Regions, the player travels from different planets; they consist of a lunar body (moon), a red planet similar to Mars, an ice world, a volcanic world, and finally a space station.

Tango Sector and Outer Regions each have a special "night wave" with its own theme music. The night level in the Tango Sector is a well-illuminated city in Wave Eight, while the Outer Regions' is the "dark side" of the lunar body in Wave Three.

== Gameplay ==
=== Enemies and credits ===
Enemies are destroyed purely for money. Most enemies move in pre-determined paths. Some enemies will try to crash into the player. Turrets also aim to hit the player. There are no obstacles to avoid (except the enemy ships themselves). While flying enemies are the most numerous, many ground targets (buildings, ships, vehicles, turrets) can be destroyed as well.

Bosses appear at the end of each wave or even halfway through the later, more difficult waves. In the Outer Regions, most but not all of the bosses at the end of a wave are ground bases where the player has to take out their various component weapons.

For each target destroyed the player earns credits. The amount of credits earned per enemy destroyed is usually proportional to how tough or dangerous it is, with some of them dropping additional credit bonuses.

The Raptor jet is particularly durable compared to player-controlled craft of other scrolling shooters, which can be destroyed with a few hits, but there are no "lives" and the game is over when the player dies, although the player can reload a recently saved game.

The player can decide to end a level prematurely, in which case they will lose all the money acquired since starting the level. Damage sustained will remain though, as will collected weapons - as such, one technique to rapidly collect money is to start a level that has an expensive, collectible weapon at the start, collect the weapon, quit and start over. After a couple dozen iterations or so, selling the gathered weapons will provide enough cash to buy most "equipped" weapons, at least the basic auto-tracking turret, and a couple of phase shields - enough to handle most levels as a Rookie.

=== Weapons and shields ===
The player (there are four playable characters) starts out with only the default machine guns, and will eventually be able to buy or collect more weapons using a credit and purchase system menu before starting or after finishing a wave.

There are two major categories of weapons: the first type is always active (all carried weapons of this type will always fire simultaneously whenever the player shoots), and the second type is selectable. During gameplay, when firing, only the currently selected selectable weapon will fire, though the currently selected weapon can be dynamically switched to deal with the appropriate situation. Some selectable weapons can only hit airborne targets, others only ground targets, while a few can hit both.

Some of the more original weapons in Raptor, compared to other shoot 'em ups, are the two types of selectable auto-tracking turrets. Other notable weapons are three selectable cannons with expensive prices, that fire continuous instant beams capable of penetrating and destroying multiple targets in one shot.

In its own category is the megabomb, a one-time use weapon which destroys everything on the screen including enemy projectiles, except for the toughest enemies (such as bosses) in which case it will damage them. It can either be picked up or purchased; a maximum of 5 megabombs can be carried at any given time.

The Raptor jet is protected by 100 points of regular shielding, which regenerate extremely slowly, when the player is not firing (except in the Elite difficulty, where it does not regenerate). There is also another kind of shield, called the phase shield, that adds another 100 points of shielding. Unlike regular shielding, phase shields do not recharge (unless the player collects a regular shield power up). Up to 5 layers of Phase Shields can be purchased in the shop, but it is possible to go beyond 5 layers if Phase Shield powerups are picked up in-battle. When the regular shielding goes lower than 10 points, the ship starts taking "physical" damage: each enemy weapon impact will cause an equipped weapon to be destroyed, starting with the currently equipped selectable weapon.

Last but not least, the player can purchase a single utility, the Ion Scanner to measure the energy and damage meter of any boss confronted.

The craft's firepower cannot be upgraded gradually, the best the player can do is pick up or buy cheaper weapons and hope to save up for the expensive ones. Since selling a weapon will only earn back half of its credits, this means that many players try to hold out until they can afford the most expensive weapons, instead of buying medium weapons as a stopgap.

== Ports ==
In 1999, Mountain King Studios re-released Raptor as a native Windows program. The original Windows version of Raptor features slightly improved graphics and audio, force feedback controller support, plus minor changes. The game itself remains the same between both versions, and many of the glitches and secrets are retained. When using the keyboard in the Windows version, the player ship's mobility is restricted to half of its normal speed, which makes gameplay much more difficult. If the player chooses to use the mouse to control their ship, it cannot be moved to the extreme right side of the screen.

A version of the game, ported by DotEmu, is compatible with Windows XP, Vista, 7, 32 and 64 bit. A new version was released in January 2015 on Steam. It is based on the previous 2010 Edition, with the addition of achievements and cloud saving. Original creator Scott Host, after regaining control of the game, released more updates with improvements and bugfixes for this version on November 2026.

Raptor was released for iOS in December 2010 by BlitWise Productions. A Mac version was published through the Mac App Store in January 2011 by DotEmu and is no longer available.

There was also at one point a Linux version offered for sale.

== Reception ==
Computer Gaming World's Chuck Miller in December 1993 described Raptor as "Apogee's most professional and competent release" since Wolfenstein 3D, with "exceptional" VGA graphics, concluding that "action aficionados will find it a holiday treasure". He again praised the game in June 1994, reporting "I have not been as hooked on an action title since Sidewinder" in 1988 and concluding that it was "the best shareware title to arrive since" Doom. Scott Miller estimates that the game eventually sold between 80,000 or 90,000 copies.

The game was reviewed in 1994 in Dragon #208 by Sandy Petersen in the "Eye of the Monitor" column. Petersen gave the game 4 out of 5 stars.

James V. Trunzo reviewed Raptor: Call of the Shadows in White Wolf Inphobia #50 (Dec., 1994), rating it a 4 out of 5 for arcade players and 3 for all others, and stated that "Raptor is very complete for a game of its type. It contains a liberal Save feature, context-sensitive Help and a variety of graphic types aside from the main gaming battlefield. While I love action/arcade games like Blake Stone, Wolfenstein 3D, Spear of Destiny and Doom, I'm not partial to games such as Raptor that are 95% arcade oriented."

Gametrailers.com and ScrewAttack have labeled it as one of their "Top Ten 2-D Shooters".

== Legacy ==
Original Raptor creator Scott Host is planning on releasing a new REMIXED Version. It will initially be available on Nintendo Switch, PC, Mac, Xbox, PlayStation, Android, Apple TV and iOS. Kraptor and RafKill are free software clones of the game. The open source Chromium B.S.U. was also inspired by frustrations with the Linux version of Raptor, while AstroMenace was inspired by the game's successor DemonStar.

In October 2023, Host gave developer "skynettx" permission to release the source code of the DOS version of Raptor under the GNU General Public License, but the game assets remain under a proprietary license.

== See also ==
- Tyrian
- Stargunner
- Demonstar
