= Hexany Audio =

Audio post-production studio

- Industry: Sound design, music production
- Founded: 2012
- Headquarters: Los Angeles, California
- Area served: North America
- Owner: Richard Ludlow; Matthew Carl Earl
- Number of employees: 20-25
- Website: hexanyaudio.com

Hexany Audio is an audio post-production studio based in the Greater Los Angeles area. It provides custom sound, original music, voice over, audio programming, and sound branding for video games, virtual reality (VR) and interactive media.

== History ==
Hexany Audio was founded in Boston in 2012 by Berklee College of Music graduates Richard Ludlow, Juan Sebastian Cortés Arango, Richard Gould, and Andy Forsberg. The company was initially developed while the founders were still students at Berklee. The company is known for sound design and music production for notable video games including John Wick: Chronicles, Star Wars: Millennium Falcon – Smugglers Run, League of Legends and Just Shapes & Beats.

== Projects ==
Notable projects of Hexany Audio include John Wick: Chronicles, Star Wars: Millennium Falcon – Smugglers Run, League of Legends, Just Shapes & Beats, Blade Runner: Revelations, Splitgate: Arena Warfare, VR Studios Men in Black: Galactic Getaway, Tencent's Arena of Valor and VRstudios' Star Trek: Dark Remnant. In October 2018, the company released the soundtracks of Chance6 Studios’ horror video game COLINA: Legacy, which were composed by Matthew Carl Earl and Jason Walsh.

== Awards and recognition ==
In 2017, Hexany Audio won the Game Audio Network Guild Awards under the category Best Music in a Casual/Social Game for their work on Strike of Kings / Realm of Valor. In 2018, the company received the Hollywood Music in Media Awards under the category Best Original Song/Score for a Mobile Video Game for their work on Arena of Valor and in 2021, it received the same award under the category Best Song/Score for a Mobile Video Game for their work on Call of Duty: Mobile.

In 2019, their work for the Star Wars: Millennium Falcon - Smuggler's Run attraction was nominated for a MPSE Golden Reel Award under the category Outstanding Achievement in Sound Design.

In 2020, Hexany Audio was featured in the Global Game Music Market report, a report that provides a detailed analysis of global game music market size and competitive landscape.
