= Math Rescue =

1992 video game

- Episode 1 Gameplay
- Developer: Redwood Games
- Publisher: Apogee Software
- Designer: Karen Crowther
- Programmer: Karen Crowther
- Artists: Dale Homburg; Jimmie Homburg
- Writer: Maya Watson
- Platforms: MS-DOS, Windows, Mac OS
- Release: October 1992
- Genres: Platform game, educational
- Mode: Single-player

Math Rescue is a 1992 educational platform game created by Karen Crowther of Redwood Games and published by Apogee Software. Its early pre-release title was "Number Rescue". Released in October 1992 for the MS-DOS platform, it is a loose successor to the earlier game Word Rescue, whose game engine was used to power the new game with minor changes. Math Rescue was initially released as shareware but later achieved a retail release. It was followed by Math Rescue Plus. There were plans to have a sequel to the game called "Gruzzle Puzzles" but it was never started.

The registered version of Math Rescue remains available for purchase. It was also released on Steam in 2015 with support for Windows and Mac OS. The game can also allow the player interact with a pair of Stereoscopic Vision Glasses.

== Gameplay ==
Math Rescue revolves around solving math problems. Boxes float in the air. Touching a box transports the player inside it, where they solve a math problem to get points.

Math Rescue includes three episodes, called Visit Volcanoes and Ice Caves, Follow the Gruzzles into Space, and See Candy Land. Only the first episode is distributed as shareware, while the others are available commercially. Each episode contains 15 levels. The game also has a learning mode to permanently enable word problems in the game.

== Plot ==
The world's numbers are stolen by the Gruzzles, which causes problems. The player character spots a Gruzzle removing numbers from the front of a house. Benny the Butterfly comes to the player character's aid and they begin a quest to stop the Gruzzles and retrieve the stolen numbers. It turns out that an alien race called the Glixerians from the planet Glixer II have sent their pets, the Gruzzles to steal Earth's numbers so that the humans will become the new Glixerians' pets. It is revealed that Benny was once a Gruzzle who took refuge on Earth. Benny recognises a Gruzzle named Zorja as his cousin and convinces her that the Gruzzles can be free on Earth away from the Glixerians. The Gruzzles return the stolen numbers and provide gardeners with built-in slug control, while the Glixerians hatch some other plot against Earth.

== Reception ==
Computer Gaming World called Math Rescue and Word Rescue "excellent choices for younger children ... though us older 'kids' will still find them entertaining. They are difficult to quit playing". The game was also given the award as "Best Education Software" in 1993.
