= Stéphane Picq =

French video game music composer (1965–2025)

Stéphane Picq (16 August 1965 – 3 February 2025) was a French composer of video game music, primarily for ERE Informatique/Exxos and Cryo Interactive.

== History ==
Picq first began composing in 1987. He retired from the industry in 1998 and moved to Madagascar. In February 2006, he announced that he was building a new studio in Madagascar and might release a compilation of old songs.

On 13 November 2015, ZOOM Platform and the Jordan Freeman Group revealed that Picq, original musical composer for MegaRace 1, had joined the MegaRace Reboot Team and would be composing the soundtrack with other team members, including Jordan Freeman and Max Petrosky, along with some special guests. The news had actually broken on the previous day, 12 November 2015, via the MegaRace Reboot's official Facebook page.

On 22 August 2016, ZOOM Platform and the Jordan Freeman Group released Picq's complete MegaRace 1 soundtrack re-mastered in stereo for the first time ever on various digital download services including Amazon MP3, CDBaby, Google Play, and iTunes.

In an interview in July 2020, he looked back on his career and in particular on the reasons that led him to leave the video game industry. The composer explained that the lack of artistic freedom made him tired.

In 2023, Picq announced on Eklecty-City the reissue of Dune: Spice Opera, the original soundtrack to the video game Dune, released in 1992.

Picq died from cancer in February 2025, at the age of 59.

== Musical style ==
Picq claimed to own dozens of instruments from all over the world and the ability to play all of them. His musical style incorporated "organic sonority", as he features many "organic sounds" such as breaths, water, sighs. The most representative examples are found in Dune: Spice Opera, but this technique is also used on other Cryo soundtracks (for example, "Thaa's Secret" in Lost Eden).

== Selected works ==
- Extase
- KULT: The Temple of Flying Saucers
- KGB
- Dune: Spice Opera (the soundtrack to the game Dune)
- MegaRace
- Commander Blood
- Dragon Lore
- Lost Eden
- Atlantis: The Lost Tales
- Riverworld
