= Mountain King Studios =

Mountain King Studios (formerly known as Cygnus Studios) is a computer game company located in Chicago, Illinois. It was founded by game programmer/game designer Scott Host. In addition to the development of Raptor: Call of the Shadows, Cygnus also collaborated with Apogee Software on a number of their games. Some members of the company split to form Rogue Entertainment, while the company itself was renamed "Mountain King Studios".

== History ==
The company started with their former name "Cygnus Studios". After completing their first ever game Galactix, Scott Miller of Apogee Software sent a letter to the leading developer, Scott Host. In response Host contacted him and made an agreement to work with Apogee. After some work on the short-lived RPG The Second Sword, Cygnus Studios and Apogee worked on a vertical-scrolling shooter called "Mercenary 2029" as its working title and then renamed Raptor: Call of the Shadows. Cygnus also helped Apogee with some of their other games under the name "Cygnus Multimedia Productions" including Duke Nukem II, Blake Stone: Aliens of Gold, Hocus Pocus and Realms of Chaos.

id Software was intrigued by the company's progress and convinced them to relocate to Texas by their office and work with them. Paul Radek, who worked on the audio for Raptor, provided id the DMX sound library for their game Doom. By December 1994, members of the company Jim Molinets, Rich Fleider and Tim Neveu went against Scott Host and left Cygnus to form their own company Rogue Entertainment. After this, Cygnus relocated back to their old place in Chicago and renamed themselves "Mountain King Studios".

By 2008, the president of Blitwise Productions, Michael P. Welch met up with Scott Host. Raptor: Call of the Shadows was Welch's favorite game on the PC and he proposed to Host to port it on the iPhone platform. Using the original source code, lead programmer Ben Moreno programmed the game on a Macintosh computer. The port took 1.5 years to make.

== Games ==
=== Released ===
Game	Details
Galactix Original release date: 1991	Release years by system: 1991 – PC (MS-DOS); 1999 – PC (Windows)
Galactix Original release date: 1991	Notes: Fixed shooter.; First Cygnus Studios title.; Self-published by Cygnus Studios.; Re-released for Windows.
Raptor: Call of the Shadows Original release date: April 1, 1994	Release years by system: 1994 – PC (MS-DOS, Linux); 1997 – PC (Windows); 2010 – iOS; 2011 – PC (Mac OS)
Raptor: Call of the Shadows Original release date: April 1, 1994	Notes: Vertical scrolling shooter.; Last Cygnus Studios title.; Working titles were "Mercenary: 2029" and "Raptor: This Ain't No Dinosaur Game!"; Published by Apogee Software.; Included in The Space Arcade Collection (2000) compilation.; Re-released for modern computers.
DemonStar Original release date: December 31, 1997	Release years by system: 1997 – PC (Windows)
DemonStar Original release date: December 31, 1997	Notes: Vertical scrolling shooter.; Self-published by Mountain King Studios.; Sequel to Galactix.; Included in The Space Arcade Collection (2000) compilation.; Spin-off titles DemonStar Secret Mission 1 and DemonStar Secret Mission 2 were released in 2002 and 2003 respectively.; Re-released as DemonStar Classic.
Swarm Assault Original release dates: October 14, 1999	Release years by system: 1999 – PC (Windows)
Swarm Assault Original release dates: October 14, 1999	Notes: Real-time strategy game.; Developed by Gate 5 Creations.; Re-released as Swarm Assault Deluxe.
Xarlor - Infinite Expanse Original release date: 2000	Release years by system: 2000 – PC (Windows)
Xarlor - Infinite Expanse Original release date: 2000	Notes: Action space shooter.; Published by Mountain King Studios.
Hypertron 2 Original release date: 2002	Release years by system: 2002 – PC (Windows)
Hypertron 2 Original release date: 2002	Notes: Third-person shooter.; Self-published by Mountain King Studios.
Juno Nemesis Original release date: 2002	Release years by system: 2003 – PC (Windows)
Juno Nemesis Original release date: 2002	Notes: Self-published by Mountain King Studios.; Re-released in 2003 as Juno Nemesis Remix.; Similar to Tempest 2000.
Swarm Rampage Original release dates: February 2002	Release years by system: 2002 – PC (Windows)
Swarm Rampage Original release dates: February 2002	Notes: Real-time strategy game.; US release published by Mountain King Studios.; Sequel to Swarm Assault.
Treasure Fall Original release date: 2004	Release years by system: 2004 – PC (Windows)
Treasure Fall Original release date: 2004	Notes: Puzzle video game.; Self-published by Mountain King Studios.

=== Cancelled ===
Before Raptor: Call of the Shadows was in development, Cygnus Studios had worked on a game titled The Second Sword for Apogee Software, which was to be a Role playing game and use the Shadowcaster engine, but the project was cancelled. Strife was briefly under development and was to be published by id Software; after a few months and during a dispute between some developers and Scott Host, it was cancelled. It was later finished by Rogue Entertainment and published by Velocity in 1996. After renaming themselves "Mountain King Studios", the company tried to develop a 3D RPG titled Mantra, but this was also cancelled in favor of the Demonstar game.
