= The New Tetris =

1999 video game

- North American box art
- Developers: H2O Entertainment; Blue Planet Software
- Publisher: Nintendo
- Programmer: David Pridie
- Artists: Christopher Bretz; Roland Longpre; Jon McBain; Jake Pokorney
- Composer: Neil Voss
- Series: Tetris
- Platform: Nintendo 64
- Release: NA: August 2, 1999; PAL: October 15, 1999
- Genre: Puzzle
- Modes: Single-player, multiplayer

The New Tetris is a 1999 puzzle video game developed by H2O Entertainment and Blue Planet Software and published by Nintendo for the Nintendo 64. An entry in the Tetris series, it showcases scenic fly-bys of structures, such as the Sphinx, the Pantheon, Saint Basil's Cathedral, a Mayan temple, and others, rendered in real-time. Achieving this level of quality was relatively challenging for the Nintendo 64 hardware. The New Tetris features a multiplayer mode with up to four players and an electronic dance music soundtrack by Neil Voss, who also composed the music for Tetrisphere.

== Game differences ==
There are several key differences in gameplay from the original Tetris. First, in addition to clearing lines, players can also form 4x4 large squares of four pieces to create "blocks." When a block is formed, it turns solid gold or silver, depending on its composition: a block built from all the same kind of piece becomes a golden block or "monosquare," while any other combination results in a silver block or "multisquare." Blocks can only be constructed from whole pieces; if any part of a piece has been cleared, it cannot be used to form a block. When a line containing pieces from a block is cleared, it earns additional points.

Second, to assist in planning block construction, the game displays three upcoming pieces and includes a "storage area" where a spare piece can be kept. If the piece in the storage area is more desirable than the currently falling piece, the player can press the L button to swap the currently falling piece with the stored piece. Another feature is that the rotation mechanics are much more flexible than in traditional Tetris games, allowing for several slight nudges, which players refer to as "wall kicks," before finding a position where the tetromino fits. Some of these adjustments move the pieces away from walls, even "over" other pieces. In fact, the game rewards players for executing these seemingly impossible "spin moves." If a line is cleared by performing a spin move, all the pieces above or below the spin move break apart into individual blocks and fall down, potentially clearing multiple lines and filling in empty spaces in the lower portion of the play area. Unfortunately, the spin move process causes golden and silver blocks to revert to ordinary pieces, meaning they no longer carry their multiplier when cleared.

Tetris Worlds includes the rules of The New Tetris under the name "Square Tetris," featuring even more flexible wall kick rules, although the criteria for what constitutes a spin move differs significantly.

The lead programmer on The New Tetris, David Pridie, placed a secret hidden rant within the code, which was discovered by hackers shortly after the game's release.

== Reception ==
Reception

Aggregate score
Aggregator	Score
GameRankings	82%

Review scores
Publication	Score
AllGame	4/5
Electronic Gaming Monthly	7.5/10
Game Informer	7/10
GameFan	80%
GamePro	(Dragon) 5/5 (Hendrix) 4.5/5
GameSpot	7.9/10
Hyper	89%
IGN	8.8/10
Nintendo Power	8.1/10
Official Nintendo Magazine	74%
Superjuegos	82/100
Gamers' Republic	B

The game received "favorable" reviews according to the review aggregation website GameRankings.
