= Lost Eden =

1995 video game

- Cover art of Lost Eden (CD-i version)
- Developer: Cryo
- Publisher: Virgin Interactive Entertainment
- Director: Rémi Herbulot
- Designers: Rémi Herbulot; Johan Robson; Philippe Ulrich
- Programmer: Patrick Dublanchet
- Writers: Johan Robson; Steve Jackson
- Composer: Stéphane Picq
- Platforms: MS-DOS, Macintosh, 3DO, CD-i
- Release: March 1995
- Genre: Adventure
- Mode: Single player

Lost Eden is an adventure game developed by Cryo and published by Virgin Interactive in March 1995 for MS-DOS, Macintosh, 3DO, and CD-i. It is set in a world where humans and dinosaurs coexist.

== Plot ==
Adam, prince of Mo, has grown up in an isolated world of humans. His mother and sister were killed less than a day's march from the Citadel of Mo by the forces of the Tyrann, led by Moorkus Rex. The king of Mo has lost all hope for the world since this tragedy.

Adam's great-grandfather is remembered as the Architect, who built gigantic fortresses across the land. The secret of their construction died with him. His grandfather is known as the Enslaver. He tore down all the citadels except the one at Mo. He drove the humans and dinosaurs apart, creating mutual distrust and, in places, sheer hatred.

Moorkus Rex, a strange, armor-plated reptile, leads the Tyrannosaurus armies, known as the Tyrann. One of the only remaining places of safety from the Tyrann is the Citadel of Mo.

== Reception ==
=== Computer versions ===
Reception

Review scores
Publication	Score
AllGame	4/5 (PC)
Next Generation	3/5
Computer Game Review	91/89/87
CD-i	89% (CDI)

Next Generation reviewed the PC version of the game, rating it three stars out of five, and stated that "Although it won't provide much of a challenge for experienced players, Lost Eden is a great title for anyone who loves a good story."

Next Generation reviewed the PC version of the game, rating it four stars out of five, and stated that "All in all, it's a solid adventure game with some very nice trimmings."

=== 3DO version ===
Reception

Review scores
Publication	Score
Electronic Gaming Monthly	7.625/10 (3DO)
Next Generation	4/5 (3DO)

The 3DO version received mostly positive reviews. Critics were unanimously pleased with the advanced pre-rendered graphics, full voice acting, sharp full motion video cutscenes, and most especially the unique and imaginative world these visuals and audio gave life to.

However, the other elements of the game divided critics. The four reviewers of Electronic Gaming Monthly and Scary Larry of GamePro were highly pleased with the simple, easy-to-learn interface, but a reviewer for Next Generation found that it loses appeal over time due to the obtrusively large cursor. While EGM's reviewers deemed the story compelling, Next Generation remarked that despite the unique milieu the plot falls into obvious cliches, and Scary Larry found the dialogues were overlong and often did nothing to enhance the story. And while Mark LeFebvre of EGM called Picq's soundtrack "truly impossible to deal with", most reviewers enjoyed it, variously calling it "relaxing", "strange and rather ethereal", and "a great earthy composition". Scary Larry gave the game a tentative recommendation, saying that the long dialogues somewhat tarnished the enjoyable puzzling, while Next Generation was more enthusiastic, concluding, "Overall, Lost Eden is well-constructed and different enough ... to warrant more than a look."
