= External Development Summit =

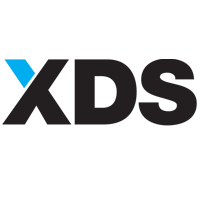
External Development Summit (XDS) logo.

The External Development Summit (XDS) is a three-day event for the video game industry with its first edition held in 2013, and hosted annually in Vancouver, BC, Canada. The summit was established in order to share video game development best practices in the areas of 2D and 3D graphics, Animation, Software Engineering, Audio, Quality Assurance and Localization. Members of the XDS Advisory Committee are responsible for the design and delivery of the event.

The event receives hundreds of attendees annually, representing 45 countries in addition to local Vancouver companies. Notable companies that have attended XDS include Microsoft Studios, Sony Interactive Entertainment, Electronic Arts, Activision, Ubisoft and Riot Games. XDS receives international delegations from countries such as Brazil, Costa Rica and the Philippines. The event traditionally consists of presentations, panel discussions, meeting system, business meetings, an expo and social events.

XDS hosted its 10th annual event in 2022, hosting 700+ international attendees. XDS 2022 featured a proprietary event platform, XDS Connect, which facilitated B2B meetings and a calendar function that helped attendees manage their week.

== Notable Components ==
=== Presentations and Panels ===
Presentations and panel discussions make up the educational component of the event. There is a formal submission process for all topics and speakers. The XDS Advisory Committee reviews all submissions and selects finalists for the event program. Past notable speakers have included Peter Moore and Andrea Reimer.

=== Expo ===
Service providers may participate in an expo to create awareness for their offerings. Expo booths are centrally located at the event, and are designed to express the creativity of each exhibiting company.

=== Charitable Donations ===
XDS provides an annual charitable donation to an organization that aligns with the goals and values of the event.

- 2016: XDS partnered with Simon Fraser University to provide a scholarship award to women entering the School of Interactive Arts and Technology.
- 2017: the award was provided to Canada Learning Code, supporting learning and development for school-age girls 8–13.
- 2018: a generous donation was made to Make-A-Wish® British Columbia & Yukon, a chapter part of the largest wish-granting organization in the world, making dreams and wishes come true for more than 450,000 children since 1980.
- 2020: XDS partnered with UK-based charity, SpecialEffect, which uses technology ranging from modified joypads to eye-control, to allow players with physical disabilities to play video games.
- 2021: a playground was built in Nyarutovu school Mukingo, Rwanda, through a partnership with The Power of Play, accessible to over 16,000 children in its expected lifespan.

=== Industry Reports ===
XDS publishes an annual report on the state of external development for the video game industry:

- 2016
- 2017
- 2018
- 2019
- 2020
- 2021
