= Xenophage: Alien Bloodsport =

1995 video game

- Cover art
- Developer: Argo Games
- Publisher: Apogee Software
- Composer: Robert Prince
- Platform: DOS
- Release: December 1995 (shareware); October 4, 1996
- Genre: Fighting game
- Mode: Single-player

Xenophage: Alien Bloodsport is a fighting game written for DOS, by Apogee Software. It was originally released as shareware in 1995. The game was best known for calling all its fatalities "Meat", with the announcer yelling "Meat" after every fatality was performed. The game was also known for featuring a parody of Barney the Dinosaur as a hidden playable character.

Xenophage was discontinued on November 6, 2003, and was re-released as freeware on April 24, 2006.

== Plot ==
Gameplay screenshot

An extraterrestrial organization known as the "Council" abducts several individuals, including two humans, from various planets due to the aggressive tendencies demonstrated by their species. Trapped inside a spaceship, they are ordered to engage in unarmed combat with each other inside holographic simulations of their homeworlds, for the amusement of the council. Should any of the combatants fail during combat, their homeworld will be destroyed.

== Reception ==
... revolutionary game design, it may indeed knock fighting fans into another universe of apocalyptic action.

— Strategy Plus Magazine
