= Bobby Prince =

American video game composer (1945–2026)

Background information
- Born: Robert Caskin Prince III; March 12, 1945; Madison, Indiana, United States
- Died: June 16, 2026 (aged 81)
- Genre: Video games
- Occupations: Video game composer; sound designer; lawyer
- Spouse: Constance Freeman (m. 2005)
- Website: bpmusic.com

Robert Caskin Prince III (March 12, 1945 – June 16, 2026) was an American video game composer and sound designer. He worked as an independent contractor for several video game companies, including 3D Realms, Apogee Entertainment, and id Software. His most notable works included sound for Wolfenstein 3D (1992), Doom, Duke Nukem II (both 1993), Doom II (1994), and Duke Nukem 3D (1996).

Prince received the Game Audio Network Guild's Lifetime Achievement Award in 2006, and his Doom work was inducted into the U.S. National Recording Registry in 2026.

== Early life and education ==
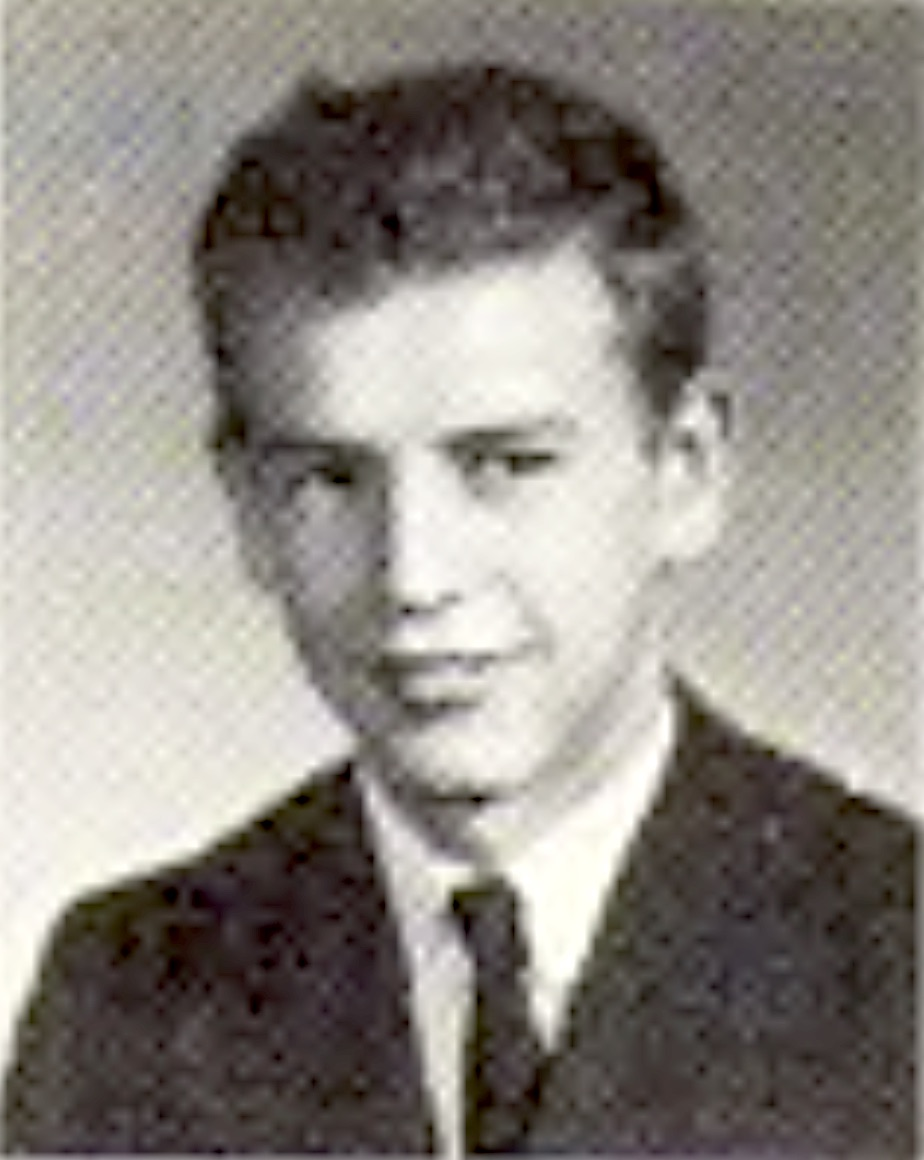
Prince's yearbook photo at the University of Georgia, 1965

Robert Caskin Prince III was born in Madison, Indiana, on March 12, 1945, the eldest son of Robert C. Prince Jr. and Dorothy Humber Prince. During childhood, his family moved multiple times before staying in Athens, Georgia, where he attended Athens High School, graduating in 1963. (Note: Years later, in 1997, Prince created a website for former students of Athens High School to reconnect.) He was a founding member of R&B band the Jesters, created with high school friends in 1964. Prince graduated from the University of Georgia with a bachelor of arts in psychology in 1966. After briefly attending Emory University, he served as a platoon leader for the United States Army in the Vietnam War from 1969 to 1970. He later returned to the University of Georgia, graduating with a master of education in counseling in 1972, and earned his Juris Doctor from the Woodrow Wilson College of Law and passed the bar in 1980. He subsequently practiced law for several years.

== Career ==
Prince was a composer who created the music and sound effects for multiple video games, mainly those created by id Software, Apogee Entertainment, and 3D Realms. Among his earliest works were parts of the Commander Keen series, after he had responded to a forum message by Apogee founder Scott Miller seeking music writers. Prince created a song, "Eat Your Vegetables", for id Software's Commander Keen in Keen Dreams (1991) but it was rejected as it would have made the game too large to fit on a single floppy disk; he later made music for its sequels, Commander Keen in Goodbye, Galaxy and Commander Keen in Aliens Ate My Babysitter (both 1991).

Prince's other early works included Wolfenstein 3D (1992), Duke Nukem II (1993), and Blake Stone: Aliens of Gold (1993); he also designed a level for Wolfenstein 3D, and worked on the soundtracks for Doom and Doom II, developed by id Software. His work on the games was inspired by heavy metal music. While creating the soundtrack, he took inspiration from multiple existing heavy metal bands, such as Alice in Chains, Pantera, and Metallica. He negotiated ancillary rights to his audio on the game, resulting in compensation when some sound effects were used in feature films. He also worked on Rise of the Triad (1995) and Duke Nukem 3D (1996).

Prince contributed to the magazine Computer Gaming World in 1994 and Game Developer in 1997. He presented at the Computer Game Developers Conference in March 1996, was one of the judges of the Front Line Awards for Game Developer in 1998, and contributed to the book Game Design: Secrets of the Sages in 1999. In 1997, he was one of several music professionals who met with the National Academy of Recording Arts and Sciences to discuss the feasibility of establishing a Grammy Award for video game music. In 2006, he received the Game Audio Network Guild's Lifetime Achievement Award, recognizing his pioneering contributions to game music. Prince's last work was creating the music for the 2014 video game Wrack. In May 2026, Prince's soundtrack to Doom was inducted into the U.S. National Recording Registry. In a press statement, the Library of Congress said that Prince's work on Doom went on to inspire future generations of video game composers.

== Personal life and death ==
Prince married Constance "Connie" Maurine Freeman on December 19, 2005, and they lived in Pigeon Forge, Tennessee. Prince had four children, including two sons, Robert IV and Andrew. He edited the book Healing Rhymes for Human Kind: A Heart Handbook Sent to the Sensitive Soul, written by his wife and published by AngelGlow Publishing in 2020.

Prince died on June 16, 2026, at the age of 81. Several people who worked alongside Prince on the Doom series paid tribute to him after his death was announced, including designer John Romero and composer Andrew Hulshult.

== Notable works ==
| Year | Title | Notes | Ref. |
|---|---|---|---|
| 1991 | Catacomb 3-D | | |
| 1991 | Commander Keen in Goodbye, Galaxy | | |
| 1991 | Commander Keen in Aliens Ate My Babysitter | | |
| 1991 | Rescue Rover 2 | | |
| 1992 | Wolfenstein 3D | | |
| 1992 | Cosmo's Cosmic Adventure | | |
| 1993 | Major Stryker | | |
| 1993 | Bio Menace | | |
| 1993 | Duke Nukem II | | |
| 1993 | Blake Stone: Aliens of Gold | | |
| 1993 | Doom | | |
| 1994 | Doom II | | |
| 1995 | Realms of Chaos | | |
| 1995 | Rise of the Triad | With Lee Jackson | |
| 1995 | Xenophage: Alien Bloodsport | | |
| 1996 | Duke Nukem 3D | With Lee Jackson | |
| 1997 | Balls of Steel | With Lee Jackson | |
| 2014 | Wrack | | |

== See also ==
- IMF (file format)
