= Tetrisphere =

1997 video game

- North American cover art
- Developer: H2O Entertainment
- Publisher: Nintendo
- Producer: Michael Tam
- Designer: Steve Shatford
- Programmer: Christopher Bailey
- Artists: Christopher Bretz; Roland Longpre
- Composer: Neil Voss
- Series: Tetris
- Platform: Nintendo 64
- Release: NA: August 11, 1997; PAL: February 1998
- Genre: Puzzle
- Modes: Single-player, multiplayer

Tetrisphere is a puzzle video game developed by H2O Entertainment and published by Nintendo for the Nintendo 64. It was released in North America on August 11, 1997, and in PAL regions in February 1998. The game, originally titled Phear, was initially intended for release on the Atari Jaguar in early 1995 but was reworked into a Tetris game for the N64 after Nintendo, a licensee for The Tetris Company, obtained the publishing rights.

Tetrisphere is a variant of Tetris in which various shapes are shifted across a wrapped three-dimensional grid resembling a sphere and subsequently destroyed. The game's objective varies depending on the mode but generally involves removing layers of shapes to reach the core of the playing field. Despite limited domestic advertising, Tetrisphere achieved moderately good sales and received mostly favorable critical reviews. Reviewers praised the game's originality and the musical score composed by Neil Voss.

== Gameplay ==
Gameplay screenshot of Rescue Mode, where the player must destroy layers of bricks to reach the sphere's core and free a trapped robot.

In most Tetris titles, a player's score is incremented by completing "lines", where a row of brick pieces without gaps is removed from the 2D playing field. This action both earns points and clears the completed row, creating space for additional pieces. However, in Tetrisphere, the objective is to remove bricks by causing three pieces of the same type to touch as a result of a "drop". A drop occurs when any brick falls, either directly from the player releasing the currently held brick or when the supporting brick below it is removed by any means.

When three bricks of the same type touch, this triggers a "combo". During a combo, the three bricks glow brightly and implode, removing themselves from the playing field. Any other same-shaped blocks that are in contact with this combo will also be removed in a chain reaction. For example, if a player has lines of nested "Z" pieces and then drops another "Z" directly on top of one of the nested "Z"s, the dropped piece will cause the piece below to implode, subsequently triggering the removal of all identical pieces touching that piece, and so forth.

The only exception is that the pieces involved (including the original three) must adhere to the rules dictating which pieces are considered "touching". For instance, any two matching pieces that are stacked must be exactly on top of each other to be removed. Laterally, each piece follows specific rules based on its shape. To illustrate, "O" pieces (a 2×2 square, colored blue) and "I" pieces (a 3×1 or 1×3 rectangle, colored green or yellow) must maintain full contact on one side with a complete side of another piece of the same shape, while all other pieces are considered "touching" if any part of them makes contact with another of the same shape.

To facilitate combos, pieces can be moved by "sliding". A piece can be moved by sliding when the player lines up the shadow of the current piece they're holding with a same-shaped piece on the sphere. A mismatched shadow and piece cannot be moved in this way. Pieces moved with sliding can pass through and destroy crystal pieces, but they cannot move through other pieces themselves.

After a combo is finished, some random pieces on the sphere will start to glow; the number of pieces this affects is proportional to the size of the combo. Pieces that glow in this way are called "power pieces". A power piece possesses unique qualities compared to a normal piece:

- First, if a combo is started with a power piece, the combo takes longer to finish. This allows the player to start additional combos while the first one is still ongoing. This increases the combo count and gives the player the opportunity to earn more points and magic.
- Second, a power piece can be slid "up" one layer on the sphere. This allows power pieces to be easily moved around the entire sphere and enables the player to set up gravity combos.
- Third, if a combo is started with a power piece, the player can then hold down the B button to slide the power piece just before it detonates, enabling them to start a new combo elsewhere on the sphere. This is called a "fuse combo".

The player can achieve higher scores by increasing the "combo multiplier". The combo multiplier indicates how much each combo is multiplied by when the combo is completed. The combo multiplier starts at 1x and has a maximum value of 20x. It can be increased in the following ways:

- Gravity combo: By sliding pieces below one above it, a piece can fall due to gravity. If the piece falls and there are at least two other adjacent pieces of the same type, a gravity combo will start automatically without the need to normally drop a piece. The combo multiplier can be increased by up to ten times in this manner.
- Fuse combo: By starting a combo with a power piece, the power piece can then be moved by sliding it over to start a new combo before it is removed. The combo multiplier can be increased by up to eleven times in this way.

In the "Vs." modes (both against the CPU and against another human player), the combo multiplier serves an additional purpose by increasing the effective rate at which garbage is sent to the opponent.

If a combo results in 20 or more pieces being removed, no power pieces will appear on the sphere. Instead, the player will be rewarded with an item of "magic". Magic is an item that the player may use at any time to remove large sections of the surface. If a player does not initially use their magic, any subsequent instance of obtaining magic will upgrade the magic they already possess to the next item. Each type of magic has its own pattern of removal, area of effect, and drawbacks. Magic items are ranked from the lowest level to the highest level as follows:

1. Firecracker: Removes one small section of pieces.
2. Dynamite: Removes multiple sections of pieces.
3. Magnet: Constantly removes pieces while it is active. The player can choose to move the cursor around during this time, allowing them to selectively remove certain sections of the sphere. The player can also keep the cursor stationary while the magnet is active to remove multiple layers of a small section of the sphere instead.
4. Atom: Removes the entire top layer of the sphere.
5. Bomb: Initially removes one section of pieces that is significantly larger in area than the firecracker. A second explosion then occurs, destroying additional pieces; its blast radius is similar to that of the firecracker.
6. Raygun: Similar to the magnet in its method of removing pieces, but it is much more efficient.

If a player possesses the Raygun and then achieves another magic reward, there is no further upgrade.

While the player is scrutinizing the playfield in search of potential combos, a blue timer known as the "speed meter" slowly counts down. When the speed meter reaches zero, a new yellow timer begins, and the player starts moving toward the sphere at an increasingly fast pace (returning to the default position for each piece dropped). This timer may also expire, resulting in a new and final red timer, which propels the player toward the playfield even faster than the yellow timer. There is no penalty if the final timer reaches zero; however, if the player gets too close to the playfield, the piece is automatically dropped. The speed meter is slightly refilled for every piece removed, and the rate at which it depletes increases in later levels.

A player starts the round with three lives (represented as hearts). A life is lost each time a player drops a piece without initiating a combo. Whenever a life is lost, any unused magic is forfeited, the combo multiplier resets to 1x, and the speed meter resets to a full blue timer. If three lives are lost, the round results in a game over.

There are several modes of play available in Tetrisphere. The main single-player mode is "Rescue", which challenges the player to free a robot from the core of a sphere. As levels increase, the number of layers, the size of the trapped robots, the rate of speed meter depletion, and the types of pieces present also increase. "Hide and Seek" shares the same objective and consists of a mix of different challenges, such as exposing a picture imprinted on the sphere's core. The "Puzzle" mode removes the drop timer, combo weapons, and the infinite and random nature of the pieces supplied to the player. Instead, players must remove all blocks from the surface of the globe, given a finite number of sliding moves and drops of selected pieces. The "Vs. CPU" and the two-player "Vs. Player" features a split-screen race to reveal a number of core squares. "Time-Trial" and "Practice" modes, as well as a training tutorial, are also available. Finally, a hidden "Lines" mode exists, where pieces cannot be dropped. Instead, blocks implode by themselves if three of the same type are aligned.

== Development ==
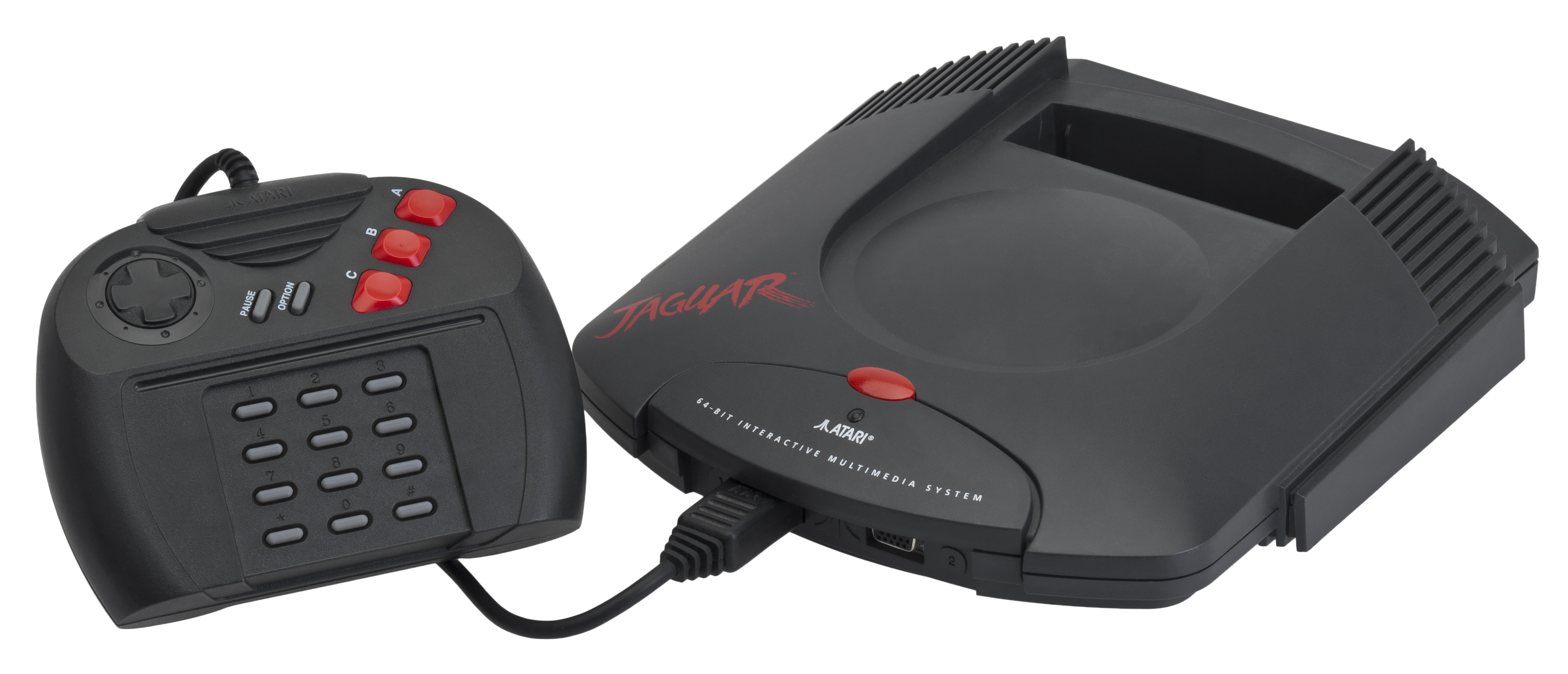
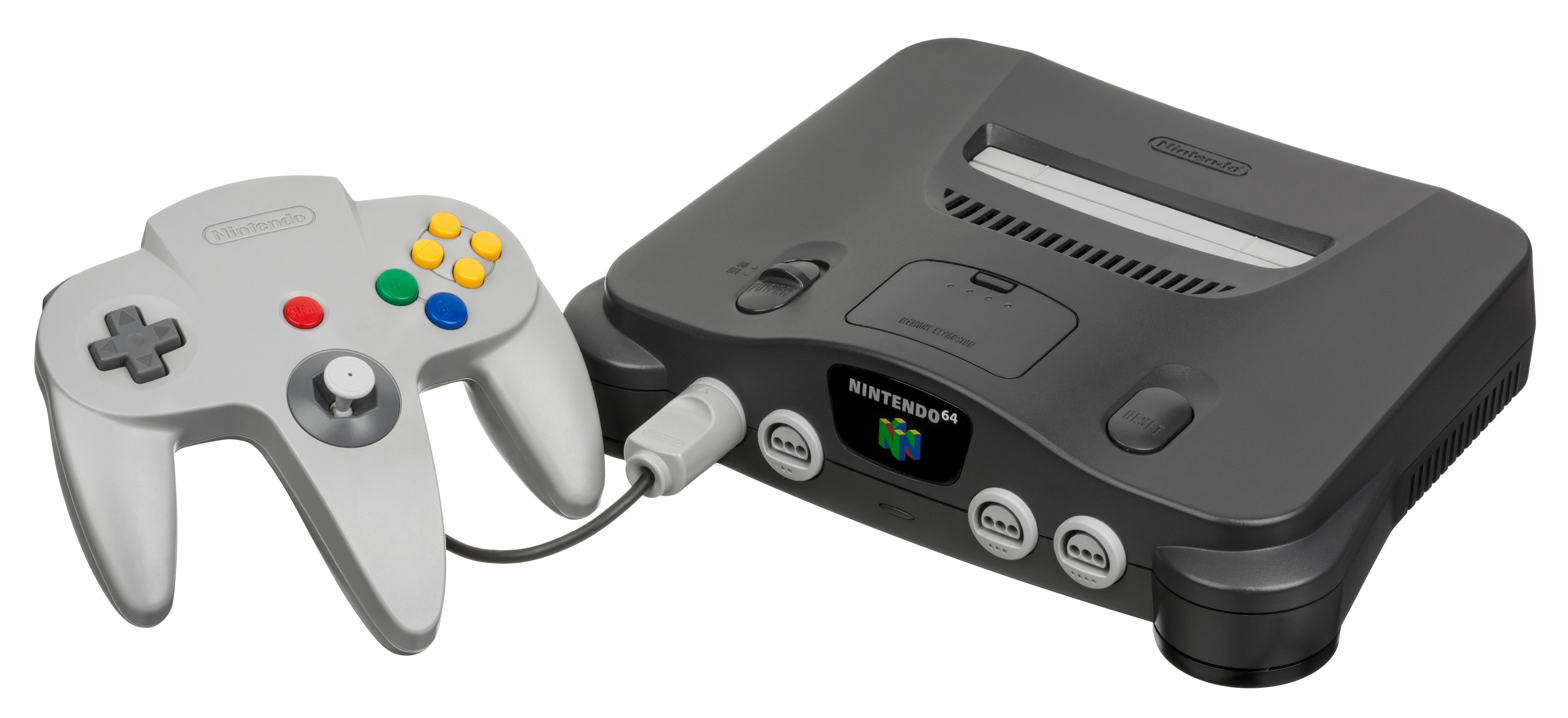
Tetrisphere started as a title intended for the Atari Jaguar under the name Phear. It was later moved to the Nintendo 64 after Nintendo reportedly secured the rights to the game upon seeing it demonstrated during Winter CES in 1995.

Tetrisphere was developed by H2O Entertainment, a game development company founded by Steve Shatford, Christopher Bailey, and Michael Tam, which was based in Calgary, Alberta, Canada. The project originally began as an Atari Jaguar game titled Phear and was showcased for play at Atari Corporation's booth during the 1995 Winter CES, featuring gameplay akin to the "Tower" challenges found in the "Hide and Seek" mode of Tetrisphere. However, it required players to create a hole of a specific size (e.g., 3×2) at the center of the sphere's core to advance to the next level. Nintendo reportedly acquired the rights to Phear after witnessing the game at WCES '95, and it was subsequently announced as a Nintendo 64 title at Nintendo Space World later that year. H2O, which had completed a reverse takeover with Canadian Entech Resources Inc., began working exclusively for Nintendo during the game's development.

Around the time the company went public, Nintendo announced that Tetrisphere would be released in October 1996, which initially boosted the company's stock. However, this announcement did not benefit the partners at H2O. "That was the first they had heard of the release date", stated Canadian Business magazine. The company endeavored to complete the game by October, but this proved to be unfeasible. The resulting delay had a significant negative impact on H2O's stock. "In terms of credibility and how investors perceived us, it really hurt us", remarked partner Michael Tam. Once the anticipated release date had passed, Nintendo allocated six employees—approximately half a department—to assist the development team.

Additionally, Nintendo imposed strict conditions on the developer. "We weren't able to disclose any information", H2O developer Michael Tam noted.

The game was developed on Silicon Graphics Indy, Indigo, and O2 workstations. The graphics were created using SoftImage on Indigo and O2 workstations. The game was written in the C programming language and compiled to target 'Ultra64' development boxes for testing and bug tracking.

Senior developers enhanced the engine so that only a portion of the sphere is visible at any given time, thereby reducing the rendering load on the N64 hardware. This improvement allowed for an increased framerate and enabled a two-player mode, which was not present in the initial version.

Stephen Shatford served as the Senior Game Designer, while Tetris creator Alexey Pajitnov contributed to the game's design during his tenure at Microsoft. The North American release of Tetrisphere was ultimately delayed until August 1997, when it became the first puzzle game available on the Nintendo 64.

The techno-style soundtrack for Tetrisphere was composed by Neil Voss using FastTracker 2 on a Pentium PC. He began the project as a freelancer while it was still in development for the Atari Jaguar and later signed on as an audio director when the game transitioned to the Nintendo 64. Voss served as the sole producer, composer, and sound engineer, although he received assistance from in-house programmer David Pridie and staff from Silicon Graphics. Initially inspired by a cyberpunk style, the team shifted to the techno genre to reflect the "uniqueness" of Tetrisphere as a puzzle game. Voss noted that the game features only stereophonic sound, explaining that "[...] for a game where the action is all around you, it could enhance gameplay and the immersive experience". He also managed to simulate surround sound.

The composer frequently utilized samples during production, particularly in the tracks "Extol", "Martist", and "Hallucid"; for instance, "Extol" features a chorus of Balinese singers sourced from a stock sample CD. The song titles were selected as they would be if released on an album. Voss explained, "'Azule Lux' was intended to mean 'blue light,' relating to one of the level backgrounds that impressed me visually. 'Snowy Mushrooms' references drug culture and also alludes to Nintendo's penchant for mushroom imagery. 'Phony' reflects my feeling that that track was too similar to Liam Howlett's work (of the Prodigy, hence my feeling of being phony). 'Extol' means to praise, which I felt was appropriate... Things like that."

== Reception ==
Reception

Aggregate score
Aggregator	Score
GameRankings	86%

Review scores
Publication	Score
AllGame	4/5
Computer and Video Games	4/5
Edge	6/10
Electronic Gaming Monthly	8.25/10
Game Informer	7.5/10
GameFan	82%
GameSpot	9.5/10
Hyper	86%
IGN	8/10
N64 Magazine	(US) 71% (UK) 69%
Next Generation	3/5
Nintendo Power	(Sept.) 7.8/10 (Aug.) 3.75/5
Entertainment Weekly	C+

Tetrisphere received "generally favorable" reviews according to the review aggregation website GameRankings, based on nine reviews. Critics widely praised its innovative design, numerous and engaging modes of play, and its funky soundtrack, which allows players to select their preferred tracks. Jer Horwitz wrote in GameSpot that Tetrisphere "is precisely the sort of game that the Nintendo 64 really needs, offering revolutionary gameplay, impressive long-term value, and a set of visual effects that go above and beyond what Sony's PlayStation can handle".

The graphics were also generally well-received. Horwitz, who experienced the game's demo as Phear at the Consumer Electronics Show, was particularly impressed with the significant improvements made over the original Jaguar version, noting the smooth spheres and dynamic 3D backgrounds.

Though they agreed that the game is innovative, critics had varying experiences with the gameplay. Next Generation and GamePro both stated that the gameplay's complexity and unprecedented mechanics make it challenging to learn, but ultimately more rewarding. GamePro noted that "it actually requires a completely new mental discipline—which is just what the aging Tetris franchise needs". GameSpot and Shawn Smith and Crispin Boyer of Electronic Gaming Monthly both argued that while mastering the game is a challenge, Tetrisphere is enjoyable even without fully understanding its strategic nuances. Smith and Boyer's co-reviewer Dan Hsu, however, asserted that mastering the game is impossible, as its 3D nature makes it impractical to get a complete view of the field within the time constraints, and tackling the puzzles blindly can be boring. IGN's Doug Perry simply commented that "Puzzler fanatics, however, may want to steer clear of this game for fear of permanent addiction".

Out of 42 titles, Tetrisphere ranked number 27 in terms of sales for Nintendo games in 1997. H2O Entertainment announced that the game had sold 430,000 copies worldwide as of March 31, 1998.

Nintendo Power ranked Tetrisphere at number 50 on its list of "100 Best Nintendo Games of All Time" in September 1997. The magazine also awarded it "Best Soundtrack" in its annual awards for that year. IGN considered the game's soundtrack to be the fourth best of any N64 game.
