= List of Atari arcade games =

Atari was an early pioneer in the video game industry. In fact, it virtually created the industry with its introduction of the arcade game Pong. The brand name "Atari" was used for many years and applied to several other entities that developed products ranging from arcade video games to home video game consoles to home computers to video games for personal computers.

Below is a list of arcade video games produced by Atari. These games were produced by Atari, Inc. from 1972 to 1984 starting with Pong, and Atari Games from 1984 to 1999. Atari no longer manufacturers arcade games. In fact, the entity that now owns the brand name, (French company, Infogrames), never has.

For a full list of games developed or published by Atari from 1972 to 1984, see List of Atari, Inc. games.

Legend
Vector display
Raster display
Unreleased

Name	Year	Max Players	Description
720°	1986	2, alternating	A skateboarding game with a unique joystick which moves in a circular fashion.
A.P.B.	1987	1	The player as "Officer Bob" drives around the city from an overhead view, catches criminals and issues fines.
Accelerator	1988	2, simultaneous	A futuristic racing game where players race on twisting tubes.
Akka Arrh	1982	2, alternating	An unreleased prototype space shooter in which the player must defend a spaceship from approaching enemies and prevent them from building a cannon.
Anti-Aircraft	1975	2, simultaneous	Each player controls an anti-aircraft gun and tries to shoot down more aircraft than their opponent.
Arcade Classics	1992	2, simultaneous	Player can select from enhanced versions of earlier Atari games, Super Centipede or Missile Command II, both of which allow for two-player simultaneous play.
Area 51	1995	2, simultaneous	The players attempt to kill the aliens and their mothership.
Area 51/Maximum Force Duo	1998	2, simultaneous	Players can choose to play either of the previous games, Area 51 or Maximum Force.
Area 51: Site 4	1998	2, simultaneous	An updated version of Atari's 1995 game with better graphics and smoother animation.
Asteroids	1979	2, alternating	The player must avoid floating asteroids and blast them to smithereens. Alien spacecraft must also be avoided or killed. One of Atari's biggest hits.
Asteroids Deluxe	1981	2, alternating	Sequel to Asteroids featuring harder gameplay, shields and automatic firing.
Atari Baseball	1979	2, simultaneous	A black and white video game of baseball where player compete against one another.
Atari Basketball	1979	2, simultaneous	A black and white basketball game where players can compete head-to-head.
Atari Football	1979	2 or 4, simultaneous	A black and white American football game where players are represented by X's and O's.
Atari Mini Golf	1978	1	An unreleased black and white mini-golf game.
Atari Soccer	1979	2 or 4, simultaneous	A black and white video game of soccer with players with X's and O's atop their heads.
Avalanche	1978	2, alternating	Players attempt to catch falling rocks via several paddles. Black and white, but uses a color overlay.
Badlands	1989	2, simultaneous	An auto racing game with guns set in a post-apocalyptic world.
Batman	1990	2, alternating	The player takes on the role of the Caped Crusader participating in scenes taken from the 1989 film of the same name. Scenes are varied and include a final confrontation with The Joker.
Battlezone	1980	1	A big hit for Atari, the player controls a tank from the point of view inside the tank. Novel controls, game cabinet and graphics made this a standout.
Beat Head	1993	2, simultaneous	A competitive rhythm game. Never released into full production.
Beavis and Butt-Head	1996	2, simultaneous	A prototype of a game based on the animated TV series; never released.
Black Widow	1982	2, alternating	The player is a spider at the middle of a web, trying to defend it from enemies.
Blasteroids	1987	2, simultaneous	Players blast asteroids and other targets and try to catch powerups to upgrade their weapons.
BMX Heat	1991	1	An unreleased motorcycle racing game.
Boxing	1977	2, simultaneous	An unreleased black and white prototype of a boxing game.
Bradley Trainer	1980	1	A special-purpose version of Battlezone for the U.S. military. Players do not control the tank as in the original game, only the tank turret.
Breakout	1976	2, alternating	Players break down a wall at the top of the screen with a ball and paddle.
California Speed	1998	1	A racing game with several different tracks set in California.
Cannonball	1976	2, alternating	An unreleased black and white game where the player tries to fire a human cannonball through an opening in a wall.
Canyon Bomber	1977	2, simultaneous	Players control blimps which fly over a canyon dropping bombs. Canyon "boulders" are worth different points. Black and white.
Centipede	1981	2, alternating	A big hit for Atari, the player controls the character at the bottom and shoots a segmented centipede as it advances down the screen through a field of mushrooms. Other enemies, such as spiders and fleas, also threaten the player.
Championship Sprint	1986	2, simultaneous	A racing game in which players attempt to beat each other around tracks while avoiding hazards.
Cloak & Dagger	1983	2, alternating	Agent X attempts to destroy Dr. Boom's underground bomb factory. Featured in a film of the same name.
Cloud 9	1983	2, alternating	The player shoots down clouds in the sky that threaten to flood his chamber at the bottom of the screen.
Cops	1994	1	A laserdisc game based on the TV series of the same name; players must shoot criminals or chase after them in their patrol car.
Cops N Robbers	1976	4, simultaneous	A black and white game; players can choose to be cops and shoot at and stop robbers or vice versa.
Crash 'N Score	1975	2, simultaneous	A black and white demolition derby game where the object is to hit randomly appearing numbered pylons.
Crystal Castles	1983	2, alternating	A moderate success, the player controls Bentley bear to collect crystals along paths in various caves with avoiding enemies. The player can find and use various powerups and secrets.
Cyberball	1988	4, simultaneous	Robotic football of the future. Robots can explode with the ball if it reaches critical temperature. Players can upgrade robots from funds from successful plays.
Cyberball 2072	1989	2, simultaneous	American football with robots.
Cyberstorm	1993	2, simultaneous	A futuristic one-on-one fighting game with robots.
Danger Express	1992	2, simultaneous	A two-player brawler which takes place on a train.
Destroyer	1977	1	A black and white game,;the player moves a destroyer along the top of the water and drops depths charges towards enemy subs.
Doctor Pong	1973	2, simultaneous	A black and white game; a free-to-play variant of Pong designed specifically for pediatricians' waiting rooms.
Dominos	1977	2, simultaneous	A black and white game; players try to make a competitor's domino trail run into theirs.
Drag Race	1977	2, simultaneous	A black and white game; players compete in a drag race.
Empire Strikes Back	1985	1	A sequel to the very successful Star Wars, this game features a color vector display and digitized voice samples as the player battles Imperial Walkers, TIE fighters and navigates asteroid fields.
Escape from the Planet of the Robot Monsters	1989	2, simultaneous	An alien race is holding hostages on a planet. The player must rescue them, destroying aliens in the process.
Fire Truck	1978	2, simultaneous	A black and white game; the player drives a fire truck through twisting city streets. In two-player mode, both players cooperatively drive the truck, one in front, one in back.
Firebeast	1983	2, alternating	An unreleased prototype also known as Dragon Master, this game was apparently inspired by Anne McCaffrey's Dragonriders of Pern series of books. Riding a flying dragon, the player must destroy silver threads before they reach the ground and start fires.
Firefox	1984	1	Based on the film of the same name, the player pilots and experimental craft as he attempts to blast enemies and gain enough fuel to finish the level.
Flyball	1976	2, simultaneous	A black and white baseball game.
Food Fight	1983	2, alternating	The player attempts to gathers piles of food and hurl them at angry chefs as he attempts to reach and eat an ice cream cone before it melts.
Freeze	1996	2, simultaneous	A puzzle game; the player must try to match three of the same colored fish in a row.
Gauntlet	1985	4, simultaneous	A huge hit for Atari, released during the Dungeons & Dragons craze, Gauntlet features four adventurers exploring a dungeon. "Health" continually runs out, requiring players to steadily pump credits into the game.
Gauntlet II	1986	4, simultaneous	A sequel to Gauntlet. Profitable, though not as big a hit as the original.
Gauntlet Dark Legacy	1999	4, simultaneous	An expansion of Gauntlet Legends featuring 5 new levels and 4 new characters
Gauntlet Legends	1998	4, simultaneous	A sequel to Gauntlet. Though it sportedsome innovative features, it garnered a lukewarm reception.
Goal IV	1975	4, simultaneous	A foosball-like game, with paddles instead of players.
Gotcha	1973	2, simultaneous	Two-player maze game where the players try to catch each other.
Gran Trak 10	1974	1	A black and white driving game where the player races around a track for points.
Gran Trak 20	1974	2, simultaneous	A black and white racing game. Players drive cars around a track for points.
Gravitar	1982	2, alternating	A difficult shoot-em up, where gravity factors into the gameplay.
Guardians of the 'Hood	1992	3, simultaneous	Players attempt to break up gangs that have taken over the character's neighborhood.
Guts and Glory	1989	2, simultaneous	An unreleased military-style shoot 'em up with multiple missions.
Hard Drivin'	1989	1	Players test drive a high-powered sports car on different stunt courses.
Hard Drivin's Airborne	1993	1	An unreleased sequel to Hard Drivin', in this racing game, the player controls a car that can transform into an airplane.
Hi-way	1975	2, alternating	A black and white driving game where players must avoid oncoming traffic.
Hot Rod Rebels	2000	1	An unreleased sequel to the San Francisco Rush series.
Hydra	1990	1	The player drives a hovercraft trying to deliver secret documents. He must avoid mines and other obstacles.
I, Robot	1983	2, alternating	The player controls a robot and destroys 3D shapes to progress to further levels.
Indiana Jones and the Temple of Doom	1985	2, alternating	An action game based on movie of the same name, this game puts the player in the role of the famed archeologist as he tries to rescue children and retrieve the Sankhara stones.
Indy 4	1976	4, simultaneous	A four-player racing game.
Indy 800	1975	8, simultaneous	An eight-player racing game.
Jet Fighter	1975	2, simultaneous	Players fly around the screen, behind clouds and open sky and fire missiles at each other.
Klax	1989	2, simultaneous	A tile-matching puzzle game where players must match falling blocks by color.
The Last Starfighter	1984	1	Unreleased prototype. The player shoots down enemy spaceships in 3D. Based on the film of the same name.
LeMans	1976	1	A black and white driving game. Players drive a car around a track using a steering wheel controller and other authentic driving apparatus.
Liberator	1982	2, alternating	The player controls four cannons facing a planet. Using a track ball and cannons, the player can shoot down incoming missiles and destroy planetary bases.
Lunar Lander	1979	1	Atari's first vector game. The player pilots a lunar landing module, trying to guide it to an appropriate landing site and set it down gently so it doesn't disintegrate on impact.
Mace: The Dark Age	1997	2, simultaneous	In this fighting game, players try to wrest control of the dark magic of the Mace of Tanis from the demon Asmodeus.
Major Havoc	1983	2, alternating	The player must defeat the enemy's defenses, dock with the enemy mothership and blow it up.
Marble Madness	1984	2, simultaneous	A hit for Atari. Using a trackball, players guide their marbles around a geometrically Escher-like landscape.
Marble Man: Marble Madness II	1991	3, simultaneous	An unreleased sequel to their hit Marble Madness. Up to three players control marbles around a fanciful landscape.
Maximum Force	1997	2, simultaneous	A shooting game; the players battle a terrorist organization.
Maze Invaders	1981	2, alternating	A shoot 'em up game in a maze with moving walls.
Metal Maniax	1994	4, simultaneous	A destruction derby game where points are awarded based on how much the player damages opponents' vehicles.
Millipede	1982	2, alternating	A sequel to Atari's hit Centipede, this game features harder gameplay and a larger variety of enemy bugs.
Missile Command	1980	2, alternating	Another huge hit for Atari. The player defends cities from incoming ballistic missiles with three anti-missile installations. Missile blasts take out incoming warheads.
Missile Command 2	1982	2, simultaneous	An unreleased sequel to Missile Command, this game introduced simultaneous multiplayer action to the game.
Monte Carlo	1980	1	Player drives a car through a twisting road viewed from above.
Moto Frenzy	1992	2, simultaneous	A motorcycle racing game where players can compete on a variety of different tracks.
Night Driver	1976	1	A black and white driving game where the player only see the reflectors to the side of the road.
Off the Wall	1991	2, simultaneous	Players try to break through a block formation using a paddle and ball to get to the next level.
Orbit	1978	2, simultaneous	A Star Trek-inspired game. Two players try to destroy each other's ships, which are shaped like ships from the Star Trek universe.
Outlaw	1976	1	A black and white game where the player tries to outdraw his computer opponent.
Paperboy	1984	1	The player controls a paperboy on a bicycle as he delivers newspapers on his route. Players must navigate around obstacles, deliver papers to correct houses and attempt to vandalize non-customers' homes. Notable for custom bicycle handlebar control and high resolution raster display.
Peter Pack Rat	1985	2, alternating	The player plays a rat and must collect a variety of objects while avoiding enemy animals.
Pin-Pong	1974	2, alternating	A black and white video game version of pinball.
Pit-Fighter	1990	3, simultaneous	A fighting game where players can choose to be a variety of different types of fighters.
Pong	1972	2, simultaneous	A simulated table tennis game where the player competes against an opponent for the highest number of points. First extremely successful video game, the game that launched the video game industry.
Pong Doubles	1973	4, simultaneous	A four-player version of Pong with up to four players playing simultaneously. Upright and cocktail versions were produced of this variant. It was released as Coupe Du Monde in France.
Pool Shark	1977	2, simultaneous	A black and white video game version of billiards.
Primal Rage	1994	2, simultaneous	The player controls a dinosaur or a giant ape and fights head-to-head against an opponent dinosaur.
Primal Rage II	1996	2, simultaneous	Exists only as a prototype. The player's monster can morph into its human representation.
Pursuit	1974	1	The player flies a biplane in World War I and tries to shoot down enemy aircraft.
Quadrapong	1974	4, simultaneous	Similar to Pong, in this four-player variant, players must protect their goal.
Quantum	1982	2, alternating	Player must capture particles with their probe's tail.
Quiz Show	1976	2, alternating	A multiple-choice question and answer game.
Qwak	1982	2, alternating	Unreleased prototype. The player shifts blocks with paths on them to create a safe path for a duck and her ducklings.
Qwak!	1974	1	Not to be confused with Qwak, this is a duck hunting game.
Race Drivin'	1990	1	A fairly standard racing game with a variety of types of tracks, such as stunt or autocross.
Rampart	1990	3, simultaneous	Players build up castles and then assault other players' towers or enemy boats. Players can reinforce their castles before another round of assault. Play continues in this fashion.
Rebound	1974	2, simultaneous	A black and white volleyball game. Players use paddle controllers to serve the ball over the net in the middle of the screen.
Red Baron	1981	1	A World War I flight/combat simulator. Players attack other planes and score higher points for long-range kills.
Relief Pitcher	1992	2, simultaneous	A baseball game with a number of advanced features; allows for detailed customization.
Return of the Jedi	1984	1	A sequel to Atari's two previous Star Wars games, this one breaks from the standard set by the previous two by featuring raster graphics. The player competes in three stages inspired by the film.
RoadBlasters	1987	1	In a futuristic setting, the player drives an advanced car and must attack enemy cars, collect fuel globes and catch power-ups. Atari provided a contest that players could win a special T-Shirt by completing all of the levels.
Road Burners	1999	8, simultaneous	A motorcycle racing game set in several famous cities around the world.
Road Riot 4WD	1991	1	An off-road driving and combat game. Players can choose from a variety of tracks.
Road Riot's Revenge Rally	1993	2, simultaneous	An offroad racing game where the player uses weapons to hinder opponent trucks.
Road Runner	1985	2, alternating	The player controls the eponymous character trying to collect birdseed and avoid Wile E. Coyote's traps. Based on the popular cartoons with the same characters.
Runaway	1982	2, alternating	The player pilots a speeding train trying to collect mailbags and avoid collisions with other trains.
S.T.U.N. Runner	1989	1	The player drives a futuristic motorcycle-like vehicle. Running time trials, he can hinder other players with his weapons, including the eponymous S.T.U.N. gun.
San Francisco Rush: Extreme Racing	1996	2, simultaneous	A racing game set in San Francisco, California.
San Francisco Rush: The Rock	1997	2, simultaneous	A sequel to San Francisco Rush with extra, harder tracks, including one set on the former prison island, Alcatraz.
San Francisco Rush 2049	1999	2, simultaneous	A sequel to San Francisco Rush, a futuristic racing game which takes place in the eponymous city.
Sebring	1979	1	An unreleased first-person racing game.
Shark Jaws	1975	2, alternating	The player is a diver trying to catch small fish while a great white shark tries to eat him.
Shuuz	1990	2, alternating	A video game of horseshoes with a distinct redneck theme.
Skull & Crossbones	1989	2, simultaneous	The players control pirates on a quest to kill the evil wizard, along the way battling and dispatching enemies.
Sky Diver	1978	2, simultaneous	The player tries to land a skydiver to a marked position on the ground, accounting for wind speed and timing the opening of the diver's chute.
Sky Raider	1978	1	The player pilots an aircraft and tries to destroy as many of a variety of enemies as possible in the allotted time.
Smokey Joe	1978	1	One-player version of Fire Truck where the player drives a fire engine through a crowded street to a fire and must avoid obstacles such as parked cars.
Solar War	1979	4, alternating	An unreleased space-themed video pinball game.
Space Duel	1982	2, simultaneous	A space combat game where players fight one another and shoot various geometric objects which float about.
Space Lords	1992	8, simultaneous	An ambitious space combat game with numerous options where the player has to complete several phases of the game.
Space Race	1973	2, simultaneous	Player attempts to guide a spaceship to the top of the screen, avoiding asteroids along the way.
Sparkz	1992	2, simultaneous	A puzzle game where players attempt to connect both sides of a pit using falling blocks.
Sprint 1	1978	1	A racing game with a variety of tracks with hazards.
Sprint 2	1976	2, simultaneous	The first game in Atari's Sprint line of racing games.
Sprint 4	1977	4, simultaneous	A racing game with a variety of tracks with hazards.
Sprint 8	1977	8, simultaneous	An 8-player variant of Atari's Sprint line of racing games.
Star Wars	1983	1	A big hit for Atari. The player pilots an X-wing fighter attacking the Death Star, a scene inspired by the hit movie Star Wars Episode IV: A New Hope. Use of digitized voice samples from the film and slick vector graphics helped this game attract a lot of attention.
Starship 1	1976	1	The player pilots a spaceship around planets and shoots enemy spacecraft.
Steel Talons	1991	2, simultaneous	Players pilot a virtual helicopter and compete head-to-head or cooperate to destroy ground targets. Features 3D polygonal graphics.
Steeplechase	1975	6, simultaneous	A horse racing game. Horses and riders are represented in simple rows on the game screen. Players must make horses jump over obstacles on the way to the finish line.
Street Drivin'	1990	1	An unreleased sequel to Hard Drivin' with a variety of types of tracks, such as stunt or autocross.
Stunt Cycle	1976	2, alternating	A black and white motorcycle racing game where players attempt to perform stunts.
Subs	1977	2, simultaneous	Player attempts to torpedo an unseen sub as many times as possible in allotted time.
Super Breakout	1978	2, alternating	The player moves a paddle back and forth to bounce a ball into a wall of bricks, breaking bricks with each hit. The goal is to destroy all the bricks.
Super Bug	1977	1	A black and white driving game where the player drives a small car through a twisting course.
Super Pong	1974	2, simultaneous	An enhanced version of Pong, with several new features. Harder than the original, and not very popular.
Super Sprint	1986	3, simultaneous	An enhanced remake of the original Sprint line of racing games, with enhanced color graphics, better controls and more immersive gameplay.
T-Mek	1994	4, simultaneous	A 3D vehicular combat game where players must defeat their opponents while piloting a MEK vehicle.
Tank	1974	2, simultaneous	An early tank combat game. Expanded version released for the Atari 2600 as Combat(1977).
Tank II	1975	2, simultaneous	The sequel to Tank.
Tank 8	1976	8, simultaneous	An 8-player version of Tank. Also the first Atari game to use a CPU.
Tempest	1981	2, alternating	Players control a crab-shaped ship and must destroy incoming enemies which slide down tunnels towards them. A very successful game for Atari, Tempest was one of the first games to feature color vector graphics.
Tenth Degree	1996	2, simultaneous	Unreleased one-on-one fighting game with the 3D characters modeled in an anime style. Similar to other one-on-one fighting games of the time, such as Tekken and SoulCalibur.
Tetris	1988	2, simultaneous	One of the most popular video games of all time in all media combined, Tetris is a puzzle game where players try to stack differently shaped blocks into solid rows.
ThunderJaws	1990	2, simultaneous	The player is an elite underwater special agent tasked to infiltrate Madam Q's headquarters and stop her nefarious plans.
Tomcat	1983	1	An unreleased and unfinished flight combat game where the player controls an F-14 Tomcat.
Toobin'	1988	2, simultaneous	A popular game for Atari. Up to two players paddle down a stream full of rapids and other obstacles, including targets to toss cans at. Atari provided a contest that players could win a special T-Shirt by collecting all of the letters in the game's name, including the apostrophe.
Touch Me	1974	4, simultaneous	A timing/pattern game similar to the popular electronic game Simon. Later converted into a handheld electronic game.
Tournament Cyberball 2072	1989	4, simultaneous	Players compete against each other or the computer in a football game played by robots. Winners receive money to upgrade their robots.
Tournament Table	1978	4, simultaneous	Features a number of selectable and graphically similar simple games (such as Pong and Soccer). For one to four players.
Triple Hunt	1977	1	A black and white hunting video game.
Ultra Tank	1978	2, simultaneous	The final game in the Tank series. Options allow the battlefield to be open or have barriers.
Vapor TRX	1998	2, simultaneous	A futuristic racing game where players pilot flying vehicles.
Vicious Circle	1996	2, simultaneous	Unreleased violent 3D fighting game.
Video Pinball	1978	4, alternating	A video game version of pinball. The playfield is a color cardboard cutout and the black-and-white video is reflected on top of it.
Vindicators	1988	2, simultaneous	A tank combat game where players fight the evil enemy, the Tangent Empire. Play is from a top-down perspective. Atari provided a contest that players could win a special T-Shirt by completing the contest level in 30 seconds.
Vindicators Part II	1988	2, simultaneous	A stripped-down version of the original Vindicators.
War: Final Assault	1999	4, simultaneous	A first-person shooter with players located in a maze.
Warlords	1980	4, simultaneous	Players defend their castles with shields and can capture and fling fireballs at opposing castles. Fireballs destroy portions of opposing castles when they strike.
Wayne Gretzky's 3D Hockey	1996	4, simultaneous	A joint venture with Midway Games, a hockey game featuring 3D graphics.
Wolf Pack	1978	1	An unreleased submarine hunting game with a unique periscope controller.
Xybots	1987	2, simultaneous	Players traverse a maze with an over-the-shoulder viewpoint of their characters. Players must destroy robots and other enemies along the way. Players have the option to buy upgrades between levels.
