= List of arcade video games: R =

This is a list of arcade video games organized alphabetically by name. It does not include PC or console games unless they were also released in video arcades. See Lists of video games for related lists.

Title	Alternate Title(s)	Year	Manufacturer	Genre(s)	Max. Players	PCB Model
R-Shark	—	1995	Dooyong	Scrolling shooter	2	
R-Type	—	1987	Irem	Scrolling shooter	2	
R-Type II	—	1989	Irem	Scrolling shooter	2	
R-Type Leo	—	1992	Irem	Scrolling shooter	2	
R.B.I. Baseball	—	1987	Atari Games	Sports	2	
R2D Tank	Red Tank	1980	Venture Line	Shooter	2	
R360: G-Loc Air Battle	—	1990	Sega		2	
Rabbit	—	1997	Aorn	Fighting	2	
Rabio Lepus	—	1987	V-System	Scrolling shooter	2	
Raccoon World	—	1998	Eolith		2	
Race Drivin'	—	1990	Atari Games	Driving	1	
Race Drivin' Panorama	—	1991	Atari Games	Driving	1	
Race On!	—	1998	Namco	Driving		
Racin' Force	—	1994	Konami	Driving		
Racing Beat	—	1991	Taito	Driving		
Racing Hero	—	1990	Sega	Driving		
Racing Jam	—	1997	Konami	Driving		
Racing Jam: Chapter 2	—	1998	Konami	Driving		
Racing Jam DX	—	1997	Konami	Driving		
Rack'em Up	The Hustler^{JP}	1987	Konami		2	
Rad Action	Ninja-Kid II^{JP} JT-104	1987	World Games			
Rad Mobile	—	1990	Sega AM2 / Sega	Racing	1	
Rad Rally	—	1991	Sega	Driving		
Radar Scope	—	1980	Nintendo	Fixed shooter	2	
Radar Zone	—	1982	Century Electronics			
Radiant Silvergun	—	1998	Treasure	Scrolling shooter	2	
Radical Radial	—	1982	Nichibutsu		2	
Radikal Bikers	—	1998	Gaelco	Racing		
Radirgy	—	2005	MileStone			NAOMI GD-ROM
Radirgy Noa	—	2009	MileStone			NAOMI cart.
Rafflesia	—	1986	Sega			
Rage of the Dragons	—	2002	SNK	Fighting	2	
Raiden	—	1990	Seibu Kaihatsu	Scrolling shooter	2	Raiden
Raiden II	—	1993	Seibu Kaihatsu	Scrolling shooter	2	Raiden2
Raiden II New	—	1996	Seibu Kaihatsu	Scrolling shooter	2	Raiden2
Raiden III	—	2005	Moss	Scrolling shooter	2	
Raiden IV	—	2007	Moss	Scrolling shooter	2	
Raiden DX	—	1994	Seibu Kaihatsu	Scrolling shooter	2	Raiden2
Raiden Fighters	—	1996	Seibu Kaihatsu	Scrolling shooter	2	Seibu SPI System
Raiden Fighters 2: 2000 Operation Hell Dive	—	2000	Seibu Kaihatsu	Scrolling shooter	2	
Raiden Fighters 2: Operation Hell Dive	—	1997	Seibu Kaihatsu	Scrolling shooter	2	Seibu SPI System
Raiden Fighters Jet	—	1998	Seibu Kaihatsu	Scrolling shooter	2	Seibu SPI System
Raiders	—	1983	Century Electronics			
Raiders5	—	1985	Taito	Maze	1	
Raiga: Strato Fighter	—	1991	Tecmo	Scrolling shooter	2	
Rail Chase	—	1991	Sega			
Rail Chase 2	—	1995	Sega			
Raimais	—	1988	Taito			
Rainbow Islands	—	1987	Taito	Platformer	2	
Rainbow Islands Extra Version	—	1988	Taito	Platformer	2	
Raizin Ping Pong	—	2002	Taito			
Rally Bike	Dash Yarou ^{JP}	1988	Taito	Racing	2	
Rally-X	—	1980	Namco	Driving	2	
Rambo	—	2008	Sega	Shooting gallery	2	
Rambo III	—	1989	Taito	Shooting gallery	2	
Rampage	—	1986	Bally Midway	Platform game	3	
Rampage World Tour	—	1997	Midway	Platform game	3	
Rampart	—	1990	Atari Games	Action	3	
Ranger Mission	—	2004	Sammy Corporation	Shooter	2	
Rapid Fire	—	1998	HanaHo Games			
Rapid River	—	1997	Namco			
Rastan Saga	—	1987	Taito	Platformer	2	
Rastan Saga II	Nastar; Nastar Warrior	1989	Taito	Platformer	2	
Rave Racer	—	1995	Namco			
RayCrisis	—	1998	Taito	Scrolling shooter		
RayForce	Layer Section; Galactic Attack; Gun Lock	1993	Taito	Scrolling shooter	2	
RayStorm	—	1996	Taito	Scrolling shooter	2	
Razzmatazz	—	1983	Sega			
RC De Go	Go By RC	1999	Taito			Taito G-Net
Reactor	—	1982	Gottlieb		2	
Reaktor	—	1987	Zilec			
Real Bout Fatal Fury	—	1995	SNK			
Real Bout Fatal Fury 2: The Newcomers	—	1998	SNK			
Real Bout Fatal Fury Special	—	1996	SNK			
Real Break: Billiard Academy	—	1998	Nakanihon			
The Real Broadway	—	1995	Merit			
The Real Ghostbusters	Meikyuu Hunter G	1987	Data East			
Real Mahjong Haihai	—	1985	Alba			
Real Mahjong Haihai Jinjiidou-hen	—	1986	Alba			
Real Mahjong Haihai Seichouhen	—	1986	Visco			
Real Puncher	—	1994	Taito			
Reality Tennis	—	1993	TCH			
Rebound	Spike	1974	Atari	Sports		
Rebus	—	1995	Microhard			
Recordbreaker	Go for the Gold^{JP}	1988	Taito			
Red Alert	WW III	1981	Irem	Fixed shooter	2	
Red Baron	—	1980	Atari	Shooter	1	
Red Clash	—	1985	Tehkan	Scrolling shooter		
Red Corsair	—	1984	Nakasawa			
Red Earth	Warzard ^{JP}	1996	Capcom	Fighting	2	CPS3
Red Hawk	Stagger I	1997	Afega			
Red Robin	—	1986	Elettronolo			
Redline Racer	—	1987	Tradewest			
Reel Fun	—	1986	Greyhound Electronics			
Regulus	—	1983	Sega	Scrolling shooter		
Relief Pitcher	—	1992	Atari Games	Sports	2	
Renegade	Nekketsu Koha Kunio-Kun ^{JP}	1986	Technōs Japan	Beat 'em up	2	
Repulse	—	1985	Sega			
Rescue		1982	Stern			
Rescue Raider	—	1987	Bally Midway			
Rettou Juundan Nekkyoku Janshi: Higashi Nippon Hen	—	1988	Video System			
The Return of Ishtar	—	1986	Namco	Action	2	Namco System 86
The Return of Lady Frog	—	1993	Microhard			
Return of the Invaders	—	1985	Taito	Fixed shooter	2	
Revelations	—	1994	Nova			
Return of the Jedi	—	1984	Atari	Rail shooter	1	
Revenger 84	—	1984	Magic Electronics			
Revolution X	—	1994	Midway	Rail shooter	3	
Rezon	—	1991	Taito	Scrolling shooter	2	
Rhythm Nation	—	200?	ICE			
Rhythm Tengoku	—	2007	Sega			
Ribbit!	—	1991	Sega			
Ridge Racer	—	1993	Namco	Racing	2	
Ridge Racer 2	—	1994	Namco	Racing	2	
Ridge Racer V	—	2000	Namco	Racing	2	
Riding Fight	—	1992	Taito			
Riding Hero	—	1990	SNK		2	NeoGeo
Rim Rockin' Basketball	—	1991	Strata			
Ring & Ball	—	199?	Microhard			
Ring King	King of Boxer	1985	Woodplace	Sports	2	
Ring of Destruction - Slammasters II	Super Muscle Bomber: The International Blowout	1994	Capcom	Fighting	2	CPS2
Ring Out 4x4	—	1999	Sega			NAOMI cart.
Ring Rage	—	1992	Taito			
Ring Riders	—	2003	Gaelco			
Riot	—	1992	NMK		2	
Riot City	—	1991	Sega			
Rip Cord	—	1979	Exidy			
Rip Off	—	1979	Cinematronics	Multidirectional shooter	2	
Risky Challenge	Gussun Oyoyo	1993	Irem		2	
Rival Schools: United By Fate	—	1997	Capcom	Fighting	2	ZN-2
River Patrol	Silver Land (bootleg)	1981	Orca	Action	2	
Riviera Hi-Score	—	1987	Merit			
Road Blaster	—	1985	Data East			
Road Burners	—	1999	Atari Games	Racing	2	
Road Fighter	—	1984	Konami	Driving	2	
Road Rage	—	1995	Konami	Racing	1	
Road Riot 4WD	—	1991	Atari Games	Racing	2	
Road Runner (Atari)	—	1985	Atari Games	Action	2	
Road Wars	—	1988	Arcadia Systems	Action	2	Arcadia
RoadBlasters	—	1987	Atari Games	Driving	1	
Robby Roto	The Adventures of Robby Roto! (full title)	1981	Bally/Midway	Maze	2	
Robo Army	—	1991	SNK		2	NeoGeo
Robo Wres 2001	—	1986	Sega			
RoboCop	—	1988	Data East			
RoboCop 2	—	1991	Data East			
Robot Bowl	—	1986	Sega			
Robotron: 2084	—	1982	Williams	Multi-directional shooter	2	
Rock 'n Rage	Koi no HotRock: John, Rick & She-na	1986	Konami		2	
Roc'n Rope	—	1983	Konami	Platformer	2	
Rock Climber	—	1981	Sega			
Rock Tris	—	199?	Yun Sung			
Rock'n 3	—	1999	Jaleco			
Rock'n 4	—	2000	Jaleco			
Rock'n Bark	—	1976	Sega			
Rock'n MegaSession	—	1999	Jaleco			
Rock'n Tread	—	1999	Jaleco			
Rock'n Tread 2	—	1999	Jaleco			
Rock-N-Roll Trivia Part 2	—	1986	Triumph Soft			
Rocket Convoy	—	1981	Radar, Ltd.		2	
Rockin' Bowl-O-Rama	—	2005	Namco			
Rockman EXE Battle Chip Stadium	—	2005	Capcom			
Rod Land	—	1990	Jaleco	Platformer	2	
Rodent Exterminator	—	2005	The Game Room		2	
Rohga: Armor Force	Wolf Fang: Kuuga 2001	1991	Data East	Scrolling shooter	2	
Roller Jammer	—	1984	Nichibutsu		2	
Rollergames	—	1991	Konami			
Rolling Crash	—	1979	Nichibutsu		2	
Rolling Crush	—	1999	Semicom			
Rolling eX.tre.me	—	1999	Gaelco			
Rolling Thunder	—	1986	Namco	Run and gun	2	Namco System 86
Rolling Thunder 2	—	1990	Namco	Run and gun	2	
Romar Triv	—	1986	Romar			
Rompers	—	1989	Namco	Maze	2	
Ron II Mah-Jongg	—	1981	Sanritsu			
Rotary Fighter	—	1979	Kansai Seiki Seisakusho			
Rough Racer	—	1990	Sega	Racing	2	
Rough Ranger	—	1988	SunA			
Rougien	—	1982	Sanritsu			
The Round Up	—	1984	Merit			
Round Trip RV	Road's Edge	1997	SNK	Racing	2	Hyper NeoGeo 64
Round Up 5: Super Delta Force	—	1989	Tatsumi			
Round-Up	Fitter^{JP} T.T. Fitter^{JP}	1981	Centuri			
Route 16	—	1981	Centuri			
Royal Card Part-Two	—	1982	Miki			
Royal King Jang Oh 2	—	1984	Dyna			
Royal Mahjong	—	1981	Nichibutsu			
Rug Rats	—	1983	Nichibutsu			
The Rumble Fish	—	2004	Sammy	Fighting	2	
The Rumble Fish 2	—	2005	Sammy	Fighting	2	
Rumba Lumber	—	1985	Taito			
Run and Gun	Slam Dunk: B-Ball Show Time	1993	Konami	Sports	4	
Run and Gun 2	Slam Dunk 2	1996	Konami	Sports	4	
Run Away	—	1979	Sun Electronics			
Run Deep	The Deep^{JP}	1988	Cream Company			
Rush & Crash	The Speed Rumbler	1986	Capcom	Racing		
Rush'n Attack	Green Beret ^{JP}	1985	Konami	Run and gun	2	
Rushing Heroes	—	1997	Konami			
Rygar	Argos no Senshi: Legendary Warrior ^{JP}	1986	Tecmo	Platformer	2	
Ryu Jin	—	1993	Taito			
Ryukyu	—	1990	Sega			
Ryuusei Janshi Kirara Star	—	1996	Jaleco			
