= Rezon =

Rezon may refer to:

- Rezon the Syrian, a biblical character and adversary of King Solomon
- Rezon (video game), a Japanese arcade game
