= Brad Fuller =

Brad Fuller may refer to:

- Brad Fuller (composer) (1953–2016), American video game composer
- Brad Fuller (producer) (born 1965), American film and television producer
- Brad Fuller (footballer) (born 1978), Australian rules footballer
- Brad Fuller (Neighbours), fictional character on Australian soap opera Neighbours
