= Cyberball =

1988 video game

- North American Genesis box art
- Developer: Atari Games (Note: Home computer versions developed by Domark; Genesis version developed by Sega; NES version developed by Tengen.)
- Publishers: Atari Games: Home computers; Domark; Genesis/Mega Drive; Sega; NES; Jaleco
- Designers: John Salwitz; Dave Ralston
- Programmers: John Salwitz; Paul Kwinn
- Artists: Dave Ralston; Mark West; Will Noble; Deborah Short
- Composers: Brad Fuller; Hal Canon; Don Diekneite; Byron Sheppard
- Platforms: Arcade, Atari ST, Amiga, Commodore 64, Amstrad CPC, ZX Spectrum, Genesis/Mega Drive, Atari Lynx, NES
- Release: September 1988: Arcade; NA: September 1988 Home computers; EU: January 1990 Genesis/Mega Drive; JP: July 28, 1990; NA: August 1990; EU: 1990 Lynx; NA: May 1991 NES; NA: January 1992
- Genre: Sports
- Modes: Single-player, multiplayer

Cyberball (サイバーボール, Saibābōru) is a 1988 sports video game developed and published by Atari Games for arcades. Set in the year 2022, the game is a 7-man variation of American football using robotic avatars of different speeds, sizes, and skill sets. Cyberball was ported to several home consoles and computers, including the Sega Genesis, Atari Lynx, and Nintendo Entertainment System.

The original Cyberball arcade game was released as a large cabinet with two monitors, each with two sets of controls for one or two players. Players on each side could play against computer opponents or head-to-head on opposing monitors for a maximum of four players. In 1989, Atari Games released a sequel to the original Cyberball in both the same large dual-monitor cabinet, titled Tournament Cyberball 2072, as well as a standalone two-player cabinet titled Cyberball 2072. The sequel included improved gameplay, which included refined player movements and more offensive plays and defensive formations, and changed its setting to 2072. Also shipped in 1989 were several conversion kits to modify existing cabinets to Tournament Cyberball 2072 or the two-player-only Cyberball 2072.

== Gameplay ==
Gameplay screenshot

The game replaces the standard downs system with an explosive ball that progresses from "cool" to "warm", "hot", and "critical" status as it is used. Players can only defuse the ball, resetting it from its current state back to "cool" by crossing the 50 yard line or by change of possession, whether through touchdown, interception, or fumble. A robot holding a critical ball while being tackled is destroyed along with the ball. The robots also possess finite durability. As offensive units are tackled, they wear down, finally issuing smoke and then flames after a number of hits. A flaming robot will explode when hit, thereby fumbling the ball. Players can use the money bonuses they earn while playing to upgrade their robots with faster and more durable units. Players select from run, pass, or option plays on offense, after which the computer presents four individual plays from which to choose. On defense, a player can select short, medium, or long defenses, and then select a specific defensive scheme.

The standard configuration allows single player, two player cooperative, two player head-to-head or four player head-to-head play. Playing with two teams of two people opened up a new dimension of gameplay. Computer-controlled avatars run offensive patterns in very specific ways before reaching their assigned passing spots. Human players, however, could exploit the fact that a number of offensive plays started with identical formations. By choosing one play, but moving their avatars in imitation of a similar but different play, the offensive team could disguise their intentions before suddenly breaking for their assigned pass locations. This offensive flexibility forced defending players to quickly recognize plays and move to break them up by rushing to what they guessed was the intended passing spot. Most often, the timely use of the defender's turbo, a short-term speed boost usable once per play, would determine whether the play resulted in a missed pass, an interception, a long gain, or a score. This ability to improvise in four player mode built the popularity of Cyberball, leading to many tournaments across the United States for a period of time.

== Arcade sequels ==
=== Native Atari cabinets ===
In 1989, Atari Games released the four-player Tournament Cyberball 2072, as well as the 2-player Cyberball 2072, which included the following changes from the original Cyberball:

- New "Game Breakers" mode
- Added Rookie mode
- Bugfixes, in particular the onside kick
- Added 100 additional plays
- Introduced the powerback and outside linebacker.

=== Conversion kits ===
Also released in 1989 were several conversion kits. These included:

- Kit to upgrade Cyberball cabinet to Tournament Cyberball 2072
- Kit to upgrade Nintendo Dual System cabinet to Tournament Cyberball 2072
- Kit to upgrade 2-player JAMMA cabinets to Cyberball 2072

Note, the conversion kit for the original Cyberball cabinet required a technician to modify the original game PCB by adding several jumper wires as well as a ROM daughter board. Other conversion kits included a full dedicated game PCB.

== Ports ==
Cyberball was released for the Nintendo Entertainment System in 1992 by Jaleco. Tengen intended to release it unlicensed, but Jaleco purchased rights to publish it first. Ports were also published for the Sega Genesis, Atari ST, Amiga, Commodore 64, Amstrad CPC, and ZX Spectrum.

=== Lynx Tournament Cyberball ===
Tournament Cyberball
- Atari Lynx box art
- Publisher: Atari Games
- Platforms: Arcade, Lynx
- Release: NA: 1989

A Tournament Cyberball 2072 port for the Atari Lynx was released by Atari Corporation in 1991.

== Reception ==
Reception

Review scores
| Publication | Score |
|---|---|
| AllGame | 3.5/5 (Arcade); 3/5 (NES) |
| Electronic Gaming Monthly | 6/10, 7/10, 6/10, 8/10 (Genesis) |
| Famitsu | 8/10, 6/10, 7/10, 6/10 |
| VideoGames & Computer Entertainment | 6/10 (NES) |
| Console XS | 76/100 (Genesis) |
| MegaTech | 80% (Genesis) |

Award
| Publication | Award |
|---|---|
| Computer and Video Games | C+VG Hit |

The NES version received less favorable reviews compared to the arcade version. GamePro noted poor controls, removed features such as player upgrades, and "archaic" graphics while lamenting the missed potential of the port overall. Chris Bieniek of VideoGames & Computer Entertainment highlighted the port as a definitive example of the limitations of the NES.

In a retrospective review, Brett Alan of Allgame praising the arcade version calling it "A highly influential futuristic sports game". He also praised the fast paced hard hitting gridiron action although gave criticized the gameplay being erratic concluding: "however, the game is undeniable fun for arcade-style sports enthusiasts." on the same website, Skyler Miller gave a negative review for the NES version writing: "The NES isn't able to handle the detailed graphics found in the arcade version of Cyberball, so this adaptation ironically ends up feeling more like a primitive version of football than a futuristic one." Megatech praised the Genesis version being a decent conversion from the arcade version and praised the graphics.
