= Cops (video game) =

1994 video game

- Arcade flyer
- Developer: Nova Productions
- Publisher: Atari Games
- Platform: Arcade
- Release: NA: October 1994
- Genre: Light-gun shooter
- Mode: Single-player

Cops is a 1994 light gun shooter video game developed by Nova Productions and published by Atari Games for arcades. It is based on the American TV program of the same name.

== Gameplay ==
Screenshot of live footage

Cops is a police simulation game that uses digitized footage filmed in Los Angeles. It offers two types of gameplay, where the player is a cop who must either shoot armed criminals while protecting the innocent or chase after escaping criminals in the patrol car.

== Development ==
Cops was developed by the UK company Nova Productions and released by Atari Games in 1994. Its design team included Rick Meyette, Joyce Flute, Ralph Perez, Paul Shepard, Stevie Landaverdie, Carole Cameron, and Mark Gruber. Speaking about the game, vice president of Atari Games marketing Mary Fujihara stated "It's a coin-operated TV show and they couldn't have picked a better series to base it on. In licensing decisions, we evaluate a product based on internal assessment of manufacturing and reliability. Even more important is how it tests. Cops was a stand-out in our testing." First previewed at the Amusement Trades Exhibition International (ATEI) in London in January 1994, Cops was originally set to be distributed by Sega in Europe and Asia according to Play Meter.

== Reception ==
Next Generation reviewed the game, rating it three stars out of five, and stated that "While it's definitely not the next level of arcade entertainment, Cops has enough going to make it worth a few extra games at its steeply-priced play." RePlay reported it was the third most-popular deluxe arcade game at the time.
