= Steel Talons =

1991 video game

- Developers: Atari Games; NuFX (Lynx); Polygames (Genesis); Panoramic (SNES)
- Publishers: Atari Games: Arcade; NA/EU: Atari Games; JP: Sega Ports Atari Corporation (Falcon/Lynx) Tengen (Genesis) Left Field Entertainment (SNES)
- Designers: Ed Logg; Ed Rotberg
- Programmer: Ed Rotberg
- Artists: Sam Comstock; Chuck Eyler; Nicholas Stern
- Composers: Brad Fuller; John Paul
- Platforms: Arcade, Atari Falcon, Lynx, Genesis, SNES
- Release: Arcade: NA: August 23, 1991; WW: November 1991
- Genre: Combat flight simulator
- Modes: Single-player, multiplayer
- Arcade system: Atari Hard Drivin'

Steel Talons is a combat flight simulator arcade video game released by Atari Games in 1991. The player pilots an "AT1196 Steel Talons combat helicopter. The 3D view is rendered with flat-shaded polygons using the TMS34010 combination CPU and programmable graphics processor. It was ported to the Genesis, Lynx, Atari Falcon, and Super Nintendo Entertainment System.

== Gameplay ==
Arcade screenshot

Steel Talons is an air combat arcade game. The player flies a helicopter equipped with a machine gun, rockets, and a limited number of air-to-surface guided missiles. It originated as a two-player cockpit arcade cabinet with both cooperative and competitive modes. In single-player mode or cooperative two-player mode, there are 19 missions. In competitive mode, players attempt to destroy each other's helicopter.

The arcade version has a joystick, analog collective lever on the left side that controls the altitude of the helicopter, and rudder pedals. The back of the seat has a speaker thumps when the player's helicopter is hit. It has a button called "real heli mode" which makes flying more difficult, but also allows more freedom of movement and can be an advantage during multiplayer games.

== Release ==
The game's date of publication is listed by the United States Copyright Office as August 23, 1991. In September 1991, Steel Talons was shown at the 1991 Amusement & Music Operators Association (AMOA) expo in Las Vegas. That November, the game was released internationally, by Sega in Japan and by Atari in Europe.

It was ported to the Genesis, Lynx, Atari Falcon, and the Super Nintendo Entertainment System. A Jaguar port was announced, but never released.

== Reception ==
In the United States, it topped the RePlay arcade charts for dedicated arcade cabinets in October 1991, and then the deluxe cabinet charts from November 1991 to February 1992, before topping it again in April 1992. In Japan, Game Machine listed Steel Talons in its March 15, 1992 issue as the third most-successful upright arcade unit of the month.

Upon its AMOA 1991 debut, The One magazine compared the arcade game favorably with Taito's 3D helicopter simulation Air Inferno (1990), stating that "Atari has gone even further, making it a lot easier to play, without compromising the complexity of the controls". They said that, despite "the complexity of the controls, the game is a classic". Sinclair User listed it among several games making the "best use of 3-D technology" at the show, and later gave it an 87% score upon its European release. Julian Rignall of Computer and Video Games gave it a 96% rating.

The Amusement & Music Operators Association (AMOA) nominated the game for the "Most Innovative New Technology" award in 1992.

GameFan reviewed the Genesis version, scoring it 172 out of 200.

== See also ==
- G-LOC: Air Battle
