= Guardians of the 'Hood =

1992 video game

- Arcade flyer
- Developer(s): Atari Games
- Publisher(s): Atari Games
- Designer(s): Gary Stark; Mark Stephen Pierce
- Composer(s): John Paul; Brad Fuller
- Platform(s): Arcade
- Release: WW: June 1992
- Genre(s): Beat 'em up
- Mode(s): Single-player, multiplayer

Guardians of the 'Hood is a 1992 side-scrolling beat 'em up developed and published by Atari Games for the arcades. The game features digitized sprites (similar to Pit-Fighter) and sprite scaling effects that gives a feeling of depth. It was originally sold in both dedicated cabinets and conversion kits.

== Gameplay ==
Guardians of the 'Hood can be played by up to three players simultaneously. Before the game begins, the player chooses between the four main characters or "guardians": Conner, Chief, Javier, and Tanya. Each has their own fighting style and attributes. Health meters are displayed for both player and enemy characters.

The player must advance through four areas (slums, subway, Chinatown and amusement park) to defeat gangs and the main boss. The game features a weapon system, where a player can collect a variety of objects along the way and throw or use them on the enemies. There is also a power move called "Magic", similar to those seen in the Street Fighter series, where the player throws a projectile at the enemy.

'Hood consists of nine stages or "waves". After completing the first one, the player returns to the gym to have a head-to-head match against a fellow guardian member. Winning two of three rounds grants the player a choice of freely proceeding to the next area or repeating the practice in the gym. From Wave 2 until Wave 7, each gang's territory is divided into three parts. The first two are belt-scroll beat 'em up sections, the latter being gang's headquarters, where at the end the player fight against their leader. Once the boss (and the gang) is defeated, he will be recruited to the guardians team as a selectable character (3 in total: Jay-Jay of The Dreads, Boris of The Shavers, and Kwan of The Dragons). During the third part, the player once again have to practice at the gym. The last two stages are located in the abandoned boardwalk headquarters, followed by a fight against Mr. Big (who is actually a female).

== Plot ==
The game is set in a fictional town in the United States named Center City, in April 1993. Three gangs: The Dreads, The Shavers, and The Dragons, led by Mr. Big, took over the neighborhood. A group of local gymgoers called "guardians" fight their way into the gangs territories in order to save the hood, regain control of the city, and discover the identity of Mr. Big.

== Reception ==
RePlay reported Guardians of the 'Hood to be the twelfth most popular arcade game of August 1992.

Hardcore Gaming 101 Kurt Kalata editor-in-chief noted that it improves on Pit-Fighter's formula, but manages "to be terrible in almost every way."
