= Peter Pack Rat =

1985 video game

- Developers: Atari Games (arcade); Software Creations
- Publishers: Atari Games (arcade); Silverbird Software
- Designer: Peter Thompson
- Programmer: Peter Thompson
- Artist: Debbie Hayes
- Composer: Brad Fuller
- Platforms: Arcade, ZX Spectrum, Commodore 64, Amstrad CPC
- Release: Arcade; July 1985; C64, CPC, ZX; 1989
- Genre: Platform
- Modes: Single-player, multiplayer
- Arcade system: Atari System 1

Peter Pack Rat is a 1985 platform game developed and released by Atari Games for the Atari System 1 arcade hardware. It was programmed by Peter Thompson, with graphics by Debbie Hayes and music by Brad Fuller. The game was only produced in small quantities, either as a standalone cabinet or as an upgrade kit to existing ones (Atari part no. 136028).

== Gameplay ==
Peter Pack Rat is a platform game where the player controls Peter, a pack rat, who must gather objects such as bottles, cans, or wrenches and take them back to the starting point to complete each level. The game features three unique stages that repeat in a fixed cycle: a junkyard, a sewer, and a large tree, with the layout, number of enemies, and amount of required objects changing each time. A group of enemies known as "The Gang" serve as the main obstacles, and include Riff Rat and the Rats of Flatbush, Clawd the cat, Scrapper the bulldog, Sticky the spider, Slugger the bat, Big Al the alligator, Diamond Jim the snake, and Nite Owl. Peter can pick up and throw additional items to stun enemies, also allowing him the ability to ride some of them about the stage. Points are awarded based on the amount of time remaining when all items are collected and the number of enemies stunned.

The game has four difficulty settings that can be selected before gameplay: Easy, Medium, Hard, and Good Luck, which change the starting level. Jeff Peters holds the official high score with 910,875 points achieved at the Camelot Arcade in Anaheim, California on March 20, 1986.

== Development ==
Peter Pack Rat was developed by the North American-based Atari Games, and it was designed and programmed by Peter Thompson with graphics and animations by Debbie Hayes (who previously worked as an animator on Watership Down, American Pop and Fire and Ice). Despite there being a 1984 copyright imprint in the game itself, an official copyright claim was not filed for the title until 1985, with the game's release being in July of that year. It was developed for the Atari System 1 upgradable arcade hardware, and it uses the same audio and coding processing subroutines as Marble Madness, also released for the platform. The game was field tested at Merlin's Castle arcade in San Jose, California for bug-checking and refinements before its widespread release.

Brad Fuller composed the music for the original arcade version, which used a main 6502A sound processor and secondary YM2151 processor for FM stereo. Music from the arcade release was included on the That's Atari Music -G.S.M. Atari Games 1- compilation album originally released in July 1991. While the first print of the album by Pony Canyon only included the three primary stage themes and a sound effect track, the second release in December 2003 by Scitron provided separate tracks for all of the game's individual jingles and short loops.

== Ports ==
Home versions for the ZX Spectrum, Commodore 64, Amstrad CPC were developed by Software Creations and released in early 1989 by Silverbird Software. An additional port for the Japanese PC Engine was also planned, even appearing in a May 1992 issue of PC Engine Fan magazine, but was eventually cancelled. Tim Follin of Software Creations provided theme arrangements for the Commodore 64 and ZX Spectrum versions.

== Reception ==
Reception

Review scores
Publication	Score
Amstrad Action	58% (CPC)
Crash	85% (ZX)
Sinclair User	83% (ZX)
ACE	695 / 1000 (C64/ZX/CPC)
Zzap!64	76% (C64)
