= California Speed (video game) =

1998 video game

- Arcade flyer
- Developer: Atari Games
- Publishers: Atari Games (arcade); Midway (N64)
- Producers: Mark Stephen Pierce; Steve Ritchie
- Programmer: Carl Ferreira
- Composers: Kevin Quinn, Dave Zabriske, Chris Granner, John Paul, Joe Lyford, Gunnar Madsen, Rich Carle, Todd Modjesky (Arcade); Barry Leitch, Pablo Buitrago (N64)
- Platforms: Arcade, Nintendo 64
- Release: Arcade; March 1998; Nintendo 64: NA: March 18, 1999
- Genre: Racing
- Modes: Single player, multiplayer
- Arcade system: Atari/Midway Seattle

California Speed is a racing video game developed and published by Atari Games. The game was first released in arcades in 1998 and was ported to the Nintendo 64 in 1999 by Midway. The Nintendo 64 version of the game contains support for the Controller Pak and the Rumble Pak.

== Gameplay ==
California Speed has players race against other players and multiple computer-controlled opponents on point-to-point races set in many cities and rural areas across the state of California. Players can race with several different cars, with automatic or manual transmissions. Courses include "civilian" traffic and other hazards that must be avoided, and provide opportunity to perform stunts such as flips and wheelies. The gameplay has been compared to that of the contemporaneous Cruis'n series co-produced by Nintendo and Midway's Chicago studios.

The arcade version allows up to four arcade cabinets to be linked together for four-player racing.

== Development ==
The game was exhibited at the January 1998 Amusement Trades Exhibition International in London and the February 1998 AOU Show in Tokyo.

=== Mojave Desert billboard ===
In April 2012, a post was made to the r/creepygaming subreddit about two billboards discovered in the "Mojave Desert" level of the Nintendo 64 version of the game which bore black text on a white background displaying a strange message reading

SoMETIMES...
God TAkES MOMMIES
ANd PuPPIES AWAY...
ANd SoMETIMES...
JuST SoMETIMES...

I do

The reason for the billboard message's inclusion was not known until February 2016, when the website PopOptiq published an article in which Morgan Godat, a textural artist for the game, explained that the game had been created under a serious time crunch, and the billboard used a placeholder texture that was inadvertently left in the final version.

== Reception ==
Reception

Aggregate score
Aggregator	Score	
Aggregator	Arcade	N64
GameRankings	N/A	44%

Review scores
Publication	Score	
Publication	Arcade	N64
AllGame	3.5/5	2.5/5
CNET Gamecenter	N/A	2/10
Consoles +	N/A	89%
Electronic Gaming Monthly	N/A	4.25/10 (Note: In Electronic Gaming Monthly's review of the Nintendo 64 version, two critics gave it each a score of 4.5/10, and the other two gave it 4/10.)
Game Informer	N/A	2.25/10
GameSpot	N/A	4.6/10
Hyper	N/A	75%
IGN	N/A	4.2/10
N64 Magazine	N/A	36%
Next Generation	3/5	N/A
Nintendo Power	N/A	6.6/10

The Nintendo 64 version received unfavorable reviews according to the review aggregation website GameRankings. Next Generation, however, said that the arcade version "is aimed directly at the middle of the gaming audience, and it plays that way too." GamePro, in a favorable review of the Nintendo 64 version, said, "Fans of California Speed's arcade counterpart will bask in its sharp N64 port, but serious racing fans may be disappointed by the game's lack of replay depth. Consider this a rental title—lease with an option to buy." (Note: GamePro gave the Nintendo 64 version three 4/5 scores for graphics, control, and fun factor, and 4.5/5 for sound.)
