= Blasteroids =

1988 video game

- North American arcade flyer
- Developer: Atari Games
- Publishers: Atari Games; Ports; Image Works
- Designer: Ed Rotberg
- Programmers: Ed Rotberg; Peter Lipson
- Artist: Sam Comstock
- Composer: Brad Fuller
- Series: Asteroids
- Platforms: Arcade, Amiga, Atari ST, Commodore 64, Amstrad CPC, MSX, MS-DOS, ZX Spectrum
- Release: Arcade: NA: February 1988; Amiga, Atari ST, C64: NA: December 1989; EU: 1989; CPC, MS-DOS, MSX, ZX Spectrum: EU: 1989
- Genre: Multidirectional shooter
- Modes: Single-player, multiplayer

Blasteroids is a 1988 multidirectional shooter video game developed and published by Atari Games for arcades. It is the third main entry in the Asteroids series, following 1981's Asteroids Deluxe. Unlike the previous games, Blasteroids uses raster graphics instead of vector graphics, and has power-ups and a boss.

Home computer versions were released by Image Works for the Amiga, Amstrad CPC, Atari ST, Commodore 64, MSX, MS-DOS, and ZX Spectrum. An emulated version of Blasteroids is an unlockable mini-game in Lego Dimensions.

== Gameplay ==
A player engages in battle

The gameplay is basically the same as the original. The player controls a spaceship viewed from "above" in a 2D representation of space, by rotating the ship, and using thrust to give the ship momentum. To slow down or completely stop moving, the player has to rotate the ship to face the direction it came from, and generate the right amount of thrust to nullify its momentum. The ship has a limited amount of fuel to generate thrust with. This fuel comes in the form of "Energy" that is also used for the ship's Shields which protect it against collisions and enemy fire. Once all Energy is gone, the player's ship is destroyed. The ship can shoot to destroy asteroids and enemy ships. The ship can also be transformed at will into 3 different versions: the Speeder with greatest speed, the Fighter with the most firepower, and the Warrior with extra armor.

Each of the Easy, Medium, Hard, and Expert difficulty settings has several galaxies, each with 9 or 16 sectors. Once a sector is completed by destroying all the asteroids, an exit portal appears to lead the player to the galactic map screen. Each sector consists of only the visible screen with wraparound.

The objective is to destroy all the asteroids which have a set speed at which they fly through the sector. Asteroids come in varying sizes, and when shot, larger asteroids break into multiple smaller ones. Only shooting the smallest ones will actually remove them from the sector. Asteroids also come in different types. Normal asteroids don't contain anything, but red asteroids can contain power-ups in the form of Power Crystals that are released by completely destroying asteroids. Crystals decay over time. Popcorn Asteroids require several hits, which expands their size, and eventually makes them stop spinning. They can't be destroyed, but stopping them is enough to finish each sector. Egg asteroids contain leeches which home in on the user's ship and suck out its energy. They can be shot and destroyed. Finally there are Seeker asteroids which home in on the player's ship after being shot.

Mukor is the alien boss, appearing after all sectors are cleared of asteroids. He will try to ram the player and will send miniature enemy ships to aid him. Mukor has tentacles which all must be shot multiple times to be destroyed. Once all tentacles are gone, Mukor is defeated and he will leave some special equipment. He will reappear in the next galaxy with a larger number of tentacles, making him harder to defeat. Mukor must be defeated in all galaxies to be fully conquered and for the player to win the game.

A second player can join the game at any time by pressing the Fire button, using 1 credit and turning Blasteroids into a multiplayer game. Both players can cooperate by covering each other, and by docking their ships into the Starlet. Docking is possible if one ship is a Speeder, and the other is a Warrior; flying over each other will turn the Speeder into a stationary Turret with more firepower, on top of the Warrior, which turns into a Spiaret, with less firepower but full control. The ships undock when either player transforms their ship into something else again. The first player to exit through the Exit Portal gets a large bonus and control of the Galactic Map.

== Reception ==
Reception

Award
Publication	Award
Computer and Video Games	C+VG Hit

In 1989, Computer and Video Games magazine gave Blasteroids the "C+VG Hit" award.
