= Escape from the Planet of the Robot Monsters =

1989 video game

- Arcade flyer
- Developer: Atari Games
- Publishers: Atari Games; Domark (ports)
- Designer: Mark Stephen Pierce
- Programmers: Bonnie Smithson; David Akers
- Artists: Mark Stephen Pierce; Mark West
- Composers: Brad Fuller; Byron Sheppard; Don Diekneite
- Platforms: Arcade, Amiga, Amstrad CPC, Atari ST, Commodore 64, MS-DOS, SAM Coupé, ZX Spectrum
- Release: 1989
- Genre: Multidirectional shooter
- Modes: Single-player, multiplayer

Escape from the Planet of the Robot Monsters is a multidirectional shooter released in arcades by Atari Games in 1989. The game is styled after campy science fiction B movies of the 1950s. It was ported to the Amiga, Amstrad CPC, Atari ST, Commodore 64, MS-DOS, SAM Coupé, and ZX Spectrum.

== Gameplay ==
SAM Coupé version

According to the introduction, Planet X is a synthetic industrial planetoid whose most notable feature is the research laboratory of the buxom and brainy Dr. Sarah Bellum. Evil aliens called Reptilons invade the planet, capture the good doctor, and force the rest of the humans to manufacture a robot army to take over the Earth.

Escape From The Planet Of The Robot Monsters is a one or two-player game in which the players must rescue Dr. Sarah Bellum from Planet X, where her research facility has been taken over by the evil Reptilons. The game is played from an isometric perspective where players control their avatars using Hall effect joysticks in the arcade version.

The player must shoot their way through a series of simple maze-like levels, releasing the human hostages along the way. Levers must be found and thrown to activate the escalators which allow access to new areas. Gems can be collected to increase the power of the player's ray gun, and food lockers may be broken into for a health boost. Bombs can be collected and used to damage or destroy all enemies within a certain distance of the player.

At the end of each level the play switches to an isometric auto-scrolling sequence in which the player controls his character in a small spaceship, and must steer left or right to navigate through a maze of obstacles. If the player reaches the end of this sequence they will progress to the next level. Defeating the boss at the end of the final level awards bonus points for every bomb and life is still in reserve and ends the game.

=== Controllers ===
Players control their avatars using Hall effect joysticks, a form of analog joysticks. This allows players to aim in 16 directions (22.5° apart) instead of the 45° directional control offered by traditional 8-way joysticks. There are 3 buttons; fire, duck and jump.

== Reception ==
Reception

Awards
Publication	Award
Crash	Crash Smash
Sinclair User	SU Classic
Your Sinclair	Megagame
