= Skull & Crossbones (video game) =

1989 video game

- Developers: Atari Games (arcade); Tengen (C64, NES)
- Publishers: Atari Games (arcade); Domark; Tengen (NES)
- Designer: Mike Hally
- Programmer: Bob Flanagan
- Artists: Sam Comstock; Bridget Erdmann; Deborah Short; Nick Stern; Susan G. McBride
- Composers: Hal Canon; Don Diekneite; Brad Fuller; Byron Sheppard
- Platforms: Arcade, Amiga, Amstrad CPC, Atari ST, Commodore 64, MS-DOS, NES, ZX Spectrum
- Release: NA: 1989
- Genre: Beat 'em up
- Modes: Single-player, multiplayer

Skull & Crossbones is a pirate-themed beat 'em up developed by Atari Games and released as an arcade video game in 1989. Developer Tengen ported the game to the Amiga, Amstrad CPC, Atari ST, Commodore 64, MS-DOS, Nintendo Entertainment System, and ZX Spectrum.

The game is playable in single and co-op modes, where the objective of both players is to rescue their kidnapped princess from the antagonist, a wizard. Player one controls One-Eye, and player two controls Red Dog. Gameplay consists of players fighting through waves of enemies and level bosses, such as Medusa and Ship Captains, collecting weapons and booty to become increasingly powerful. Collectable items are centred around the pirate theme, such as the cutlass or flintlock pistol.

Reception of Skulls & Crossbones was mixed to positive, with magazines like The One praising the pirate atmosphere and innovative twist on the beat 'em up genre.

== Gameplay ==
One-Eye (right), fighting a pirate captain using a cutlass

The game's player characters are One-Eye (player one) and Red Dog (player two), pirates on an adventure to find a wizard who kidnapped their princess. In order to rescue their princess, they must collect weapons and booty. The booty is traded for weapons at the end of each level. The weapons the player receives and the amount of each weapon is dependent on what types and how much of each kind of booty that was collected. Finding weapons and booty is absolutely necessary in this game, as the default punch attack is not very powerful and ultimately ineffective.

There are several different types of weapons and booty to collect in each level, though not all weapon types appear in every level. Of the three major weapon types that appear in most levels, the cutlass is the weakest and only has a slightly longer range than the punch. However, a cutlass is not wasted if it does not hit an enemy. The knife is the mid-level weapon and is similar to the knife weapon in Castlevania. The player throws this weapon in a straight line in front of them. The flintlock pistol is more powerful than both the cutlass and the knife, firing a musket ball straight in front of the player.

To complete each level, the player must defeat 15 enemies and a level boss. Skull & Crossbones has seven game levels. In some ports of the game, the first six levels may be played in any sequence: One-Eye's Ship, Spanish Castle, Pirate's Ship #1, Ninja Camp, Pirate's Ship #2, Beach Cave, and Pirate's Ship #3. Once these levels are complete, the players go to the final level, the Wizard's Lair.

In the arcade version, the players are given three opportunities to change the difficulty of the game, at the end of One-Eye's Ship level and after the first two Pirate's Ship levels, and have a chance to get an opportunity item in the Castle, Ninja Lair, and Beach Cave. However, the levels are forcibly played in the written sequence above. In two-player mode, there are a few specific changes to how the game plays. Apart from the Pirate's Ship levels, players must duel at the end of each level to see who gets an invulnerability item.

Each credit gives 50 health points to whichever player the credit was added for. Each level has a time limit that can be raised by obtaining hourglasses from killed enemies, but running out of time only results in slowly losing life and can be counteracted by buying additional credits.

Each of the two player pirates behaves the same and face either left or right, but can turn with the appropriate button. The sword button can be pressed to block and the joystick can be used in combination with the button to throw various attacks, thrusts and stabs. Red X's appear often denoting jumps and cranks, and white crosses can be dug up with the sword button to obtain various treasures. A parrot belonging to the pirate constantly flies with the players and recites roughly twelve different lines nonstop. The parrots only appear in the arcade version.

Each of the three pirate ship levels has a Pirate Captain boss at the end of the level and a woman referred to in the game as a wench, while the other three levels have an Executioner (a heavy hitter), Monk (a fast attacker), and Medusa (a turret) boss for their respective stages. The Medusa's attacks can be avoided altogether by facing away and using back-stabs; if the players have chosen the easiest difficulty, an onscreen hint advises them not to look at Medusa. In the Wizard's Lair, these bosses are encountered again in order and the player who grabbed the invulnerability item on their respective stages immediately regains the use of that item for a duration. The wizard boss at the end will appear on one side of the room and launch Wizard Balls that stun the player and when attacked will teleport to the other side and continue. After several hits, the player will behead him and will be given a chance to pick up some last wealth items before the game is proclaimed to be over soon afterwards.

== Reception ==
Reception

Review score
| Publication | Score |
|---|---|
| Electronic Gaming Monthly | 4/10, 4/10, 4/10, 4/10 (NES) |

The One gave the Amiga version of Skull & Crossbones an overall score of 77%, noting it as "a slight deviation from the usual beat 'em up fare, and it gives the genre a couple of unusual twists." The One praises Skull & Crossbones' graphics and music, stating the graphics "convey the action well enough and, together with a brace of catchy tunes, they help create the perfect pirate atmosphere" and express that the two-player mode adds "a lot more fun, since you've got the added element of fighting over who gets the extra energy and money." The One concludes that "[Skull & Crossbones] isn't the greatest or most polished beat 'em up in existence", but is 'good and entertaining'.
