= War Final Assault =

1999 video game

- War Final Assault arcade flyer
- Developers: Atari Games; Midway Games
- Publishers: Atari Games; Midway Games
- Designers: Bruce Rodgers; Roberto Rodriguez
- Composer: Michael Henry
- Platform: Arcade
- Release: NA: March 25, 1999; EU: October 1, 1999; UK: October 18, 1999 (Butlin's Minehead)
- Genre: First-person shooter / Third-person shooter
- Modes: Up to 4 players (one per cabinet), cooperative and head to head

War: Final Assault is a first-person shooter arcade game developed and manufactured by Atari Games and Midway Games. It was released on March 25, 1999 In North America, October 1, 1999 In Europe and on October 18, 1999 In Butlin's Minehead, United Kingdom. A Nintendo 64 version by Midway Games was planned, but its release was cancelled. There was also a PlayStation version in the works, which was also cancelled.

== Plot ==
A team of commandos have been dispatched to Siberia to take out the ruthless General Yuri Nienov, who has declared war on the free world. After penetrating the general's base, the commandos find that he is using alien technology to obliterate the Earth. Provided all the pentabolt keys are procured, the commandos are able to follow Yuri. The insane general refuses to surrender and after losing to the commandos transforms himself into an alien beast. However the commandos are able to destroy him and put a stop to his hideous war plans.

== Gameplay ==
There are two main modes to the game: Campaign and Head-to-Head. A single player is forced to play through the campaign, but if multiple people are playing the game they can either cooperatively play through that mode or alternatively play the free for all Head-to-Head. The campaign is made up of eight different levels each with a variety of enemies and ending in a unique boss fight. There are 4 maps in the Head-to-Head mode.

When starting up the game, the player is allowed to pick one of four characters (multiple players can pick the same avatar), each with its own strengths and weakness. Players are also able to track and record their game progress by entering a name and PIN. As the player kills more enemies and other players, their slowly rank up. While this has no impact on gameplay, it does allow players to pick from a variety of hidden characters as well.

The game has a single analog joystick with two buttons: a trigger button that fires the current weapon and a button on top of the joystick to "eject", or drop, the weapon the player is holding. The joystick was specifically molded for the War cabinet. Additionally, there are 6 other buttons: 4 for movement (forward, backward and strafing), one for Jump and one labeled View. The View button switched you between third-person and first-person modes.

The game features a large selection of weapons. Each player has a unique starting weapon and the player can also find various weapons lying around on the battlefield, from a short-range flame-thrower to a laser cannon with reflecting projectiles.

== Holidays Amusements Arcade list ==
- Butlins (1999–2003)
