= Gauntlet Dark Legacy =

1999 video game

- Arcade flyer
- Developer: Midway Games West (Note: Game Boy Advance version developed by Pocket Studios.)
- Publisher: Midway
- Composers: John Paul; Barry Leitch
- Series: Gauntlet
- Platforms: Arcade, PlayStation 2, GameCube, Xbox, Game Boy Advance
- Release: June 2000: Arcade; NA: June 2000 PlayStation 2; NA: May 2, 2001; PAL: June 15, 2001; JP: July 25, 2002 GameCube; NA: March 5, 2002; PAL: July 19, 2002 Xbox; NA: April 23, 2002; PAL: June 28, 2002 Game Boy Advance; NA: November 25, 2002
- Genres: Hack and slash, dungeon crawl
- Modes: Single-player, multiplayer
- Arcade system: Midway Vegas

Gauntlet Dark Legacy is a 2000 hack and slash video game developed by Midway Games West and published by Midway for arcades. It is the seventh title in the Gauntlet series, and an expansion of 1998's Gauntlet Legends. The game adds five new levels, and four new character classes: Dwarf, Knight, Jester, and Sorceress. It also adds a large number of secret characters, some of which can be unlocked in the game, while others are only accessible by entering specific cheat codes.

Elements from Dark Legacy were integrated into the Dreamcast port of Gauntlet Legends. A direct port to the PlayStation 2 was released in 2001, followed by versions for the Game Boy Advance, GameCube, and Xbox in 2002. A Game Boy Color port was considered but never released by Midway.

While the console versions of the game received mixed reviews, the Game Boy Advance version was generally negative.

== Gameplay ==
Gauntlet Dark Legacy, as an expansion to Gauntlet Legends, plays similarly, but with new levels, items, characters, and combat capabilities. The player has the option of performing a slow, strong attack, or a quick, weaker attack, as opposed to Legends, where there is only one type of attack. In Gauntlet Dark Legacy, the player can perform combos by using slow attacks and quick attacks in sequence while engaged in melee combat. Combos are much stronger than normal attacks, and are usually capable of taking out several enemies at once. As in Legends, each player has a turbo gauge that refills slowly and automatically. This turbo gauge allows the player to use turbo attacks, which do damage in a wide area or over a long distance, and can pierce through multiple enemies and walls. When the turbo gauge is empty, no turbo attacks can be used until it filled up again. Dark Legacy adds the ability for two players standing adjacent to each other to perform a combination turbo attack together, usually packing a lot of force (and draining half of the turbo gauge of the player that initiated the combination turbo).

The player can gather items from within levels or purchase them in the shop. Items are activated upon pickup on the arcade and PlayStation 2 versions, however, on the GameCube and Xbox versions, item pickups can be disabled using the item menu. Items provide benefits and disappear within a set time or set number of uses. Dark Legacy has more items than the original, though are generally more expensive. This places more emphasis on the decision of which items to buy.

In Dark Legacy, the player has the added abilities of blocking, charging, and strafing. Strafing allows the player to constantly face one direction and fire medium-speed attacks. Blocking causes the player's character to stand still in a defensive position for a brief moment. Any attacks made against the player are negated or do significantly less damage. When charging, players run forward with their weapons functioning like a lance while simultaneously blocking. Players can kill the enemies ahead of them while blocking their attacks. However, charging does consume a bit of the turbo gauge each time it is used.

The gameplay has roots in the original Gauntlet games. Most levels involve simply running along a designated path, destroying enemies before they can kill the player. Like in Gauntlet and Gauntlet II, enemies spawn from generators. Only when the generator is destroyed will the enemies stop spawning. Some generators will take multiple hits to destroy; as the generator is weakened, it will spawn less powerful enemies, until it is destroyed completely. There are some levels that have a maze-like aspect and are harder to navigate. Generally, levels have the path to the end easily in sight, with separate side paths that are harder to access. These side paths usually lead to important items, such as treasure, legendary weapons (which are used to weaken bosses), or runestones (which are required to progress through the game). Some levels will have a short movie before the level loads, serving to introduce the player to new types of enemies, or alerting the player that a legendary weapon is hidden somewhere in the level. Runestones are not hinted at in movies, though if a level that has a runestone is exited without the runestone being found, an evil laugh sound is played. Food still recovers health in Dark Legacy as it does in all other Gauntlet, with each type of food restoring a different amount of health. Treasure is rarer in Dark Legacy than in previous games in the series. As in Legends, treasure is used to purchase items in the shop. In earlier games in the series, treasure merely added to a player's score.

=== Characters ===
Each character has unmatched abilities in certain areas:

Area	Effect
Magic	Increases the range of and damage inflicted from magic potion use.
Strength	Inflicts more damage to enemies when attacking.
Speed	Allows the character to move & attack more quickly.
Armor	Gives the character more durability when hit.

In addition, each set of characters has a special power they can use when they use magic potions at a certain level of experience.

- Wizard/Jackal and Sorceress/Medusa have superior abilities in magic and with magic potions. Their magic potions cleanse poisoned fruit after level 25 and meat after level 50.
- Valkyrie/Falconess and Knight/Unicorn have superior abilities in armor and protection. Traps become disabled at level 25 or destroyed after level 50 when they use magic potions.
- Warrior/Minotaur and Dwarf/Ogre have superior abilities in strength. When they use magic potions nearby piles of junk transform into piles of silver at level 25 and gold at level 50.
- Archer/Tigress and Jester/Hyena have superior abilities in speed and reflexes. Walls hiding secret areas are revealed at level 25 or destroyed at level 50 when they use magic potions.

The wizard Sumner is also available to be played after being unlocked in one of the final levels of the game.

== Plot ==
In an ancient time, the evil mage Garm, using the power of the Runestones, released a great evil upon the land. This demon, Skorne, broke free of Garm's control, crushing him and imprisoning his soul in the underworld. Skorne then released his minions upon the land, and scattered the Runestones across the Eight Realms, so that they might never again be assembled and used against him.

No one has dared try ...

Until now.

— The game's introductory cinematic narrated by Mr. Lawrence

The manual included with the game elaborates on the story further, stating that Sumner is the good king of the eight realms and presides over them from his tower. The tower contained portals to all the realms for his easy access to them. It also stated that Garm, his younger brother, jealous of his power and status, searched for years for the 13 Runestones. Upon finding 12 after much toil of searching, he became impatient, and released Skorne then and there. Unfortunately, he was not able to control the demon without the 13th Runestone. Skorne summoned his minions and sent them through the portals in the tower to conquer the realms. Sumner, who was away at the time, returned to the tower, only to see the demon Skorne using it for his own evil gain. This infuriated Sumner, and he angrily engaged in battle with Skorne after sealing all the portals. Skorne was "no match" for Sumner's power, according to the manual, and he retreated into a deserted temple through Sumner's tower. Skorne shattered the enchanted stained glass window that was the only gateway to the temple, and gave one shard to each of his most powerful minions (the bosses of the game). He also scattered the 12 assembled Runestones across the various worlds. The temple from that point on is referred to as the Desecrated Temple.

The game is divided up into worlds, each containing a number of levels, all accessible from Sumner's tower.

The player's first objective is to beat all the levels, vanquishing the bosses of the eight originally available worlds. The player must collect crystals scattered about the levels to deactivate Sumner's protective shielding and gain access to new worlds and more levels. Upon defeating the bosses, the stained-glass window is slowly restored, and the light pouring from it reveals a special portal in the tower. This portal takes the player to the 9th world, the Desecrated Temple. The player must fight through a single level packed with enemies. Upon exiting, the player is automatically transported to Skorne's chamber. Here the player has to defeat the demon Skorne. After his defeat, he retreats into the Underworld. The player must then collect 12 Runestones from the previous 8 worlds. Once that is accomplished, their power reveals another special portal in the tower, leading the player into the 10th world, the Underworld. There, after beating a single level, the player is automatically transported to the battle with True Skorne. The player defeats True Skorne, banishing him from the eight realms forever. But the war is not over. Garm absorbs the fading remnants of Skorne's power, becoming a huge, immensely powerful statue of Skorne. He forms an army and unleashes an assault upon Sumner's tower. The player's final goal is to beat the 11th and final world, the Battlegrounds. After beating the third level of this world and collecting the 13th Runestone that is hidden within it, the fourth and final special portal is revealed in the tower. This portal takes the player to Garm's Citadel, where the final battle of the game takes place.

== Reception ==
Reception

Aggregate scores
Aggregator	Score
GameRankings	(PS2) 70.77% (GC) 61.43% (Xbox) 52.65% (GBA) 35.25%
Metacritic	(PS2) 73/100 (GC) 60/100 (Xbox) 54/100 (GBA) 37/100

Review scores
Publication	Score
AllGame	3.5/5 (Xbox) 3/5 (GBA) 1.5/5
Famitsu	31/40
Game Informer	(PS2) 7.75/10 (GC) 7.25/10 (GBA) 1.5/10
GamePro	(PS2) 4.5/5 (GC) 3/5
GameRevolution	C+
GameSpot	(PS2) 6.2/10; 5.1/10 (GBA) 4.3/10
GameSpy	(PS2) 85% (GC) 58% (GBA) 1/5
GameZone	(PS2) 8/10 (GC) 7.3/10 (Xbox) 7.2/10 (GBA) 5.2/10
IGN	(PS2) 6.7/10 (GC) 5/10 (Xbox) 4.9/10 (GBA) 3/10
Next Generation	3/5
Nintendo Power	(GC) 3.6/5 (GBA) 2.5/5
Nintendo World Report	(GC) 7/10
Official Xbox Magazine (US)	6.2/10

Daniel Erickson reviewed the PlayStation 2 version of the game for Next Generation, rating it three stars out of five: "It's not brain surgery, but it's good multi-player fun, and that's rare enough these days".

Gerald Villoria of GameSpot stated of the Xbox and GameCube versions that "the game's extremely dated appearance and poor performance keep it from competing with other popular four-player games" at the time.

Of all the console versions of the game, the PlayStation 2 version was the most well-received, with a score of 31 out of 40 from Famitsu, and an average score of 70.77% on GameRankings and 73 out of 100 from Metacritic. The GameCube and Xbox versions, which were both built off the PS2 version and released a year later, received less favorable score averages of 61.43% and 52.65% (GameRankings) and 60 and 54 out of 100 (Metacritic) on the same two sites. Even though these versions added new features to the game, such as the ability to save power-ups for later use, their number of glitches was reportedly greater. The GameCube version is especially notable in this aspect, as it suffered major slowdown in large or highly detailed areas, and did not show life bars for golems, gargoyles, and bosses (except in the PAL version).

The Game Boy Advance version's reception was very negative, with an average score of only 35.25% on GameRankings and 37 out of 100 from Metacritic. One of the worst aspects of this particular version, according to GameSpot, was the absence of multi-player, which is a vital part of the Gauntlet franchise.

== Tie-in media ==
In 2004, publisher iBooks (an imprint of Simon & Schuster) released a novel based upon the video game titled Gauntlet Dark Legacy - Book 1: Paths Of Evil by Richard C. White (ISBN 0-74349-305-2). The sequel Gauntlet Dark Legacy - Book 2: Paths Of Fear was written and was planned for a 2005 release, but due to the demise of both Byron Preiss Visual Productions and the licensor, this never came to pass. As of 2007, the license for these stories had reverted to Midway, and unless a new licensor commissions White to finish his tale, Book 1 will likely be the last of the Gauntlet series.
