= Off the Wall (1991 video game) =

1991 video game

- Arcade flyer
- Developer: Atari Games
- Publisher: Atari Games
- Designers: Kelly Turner; Norm Avellar
- Programmers: Kelly Turner; Norm Avellar
- Artists: Sam Comstock; Chuck Eyler
- Composer: John Paul
- Platform: Arcade
- Release: NA: October 1991
- Genre: Breakout
- Modes: Single-player, multiplayer

Off the Wall is a 1991 arcade video game developed and published by Atari Games. A remake of Breakout, it features numerous additional gameplay elements compared to the original, including ball-spin physics, and it supports up to three players simultaneously. The game features backgrounds based on modernist abstract art.

== Gameplay ==
The main objective of Off the Wall is to score as many points as possible by destroying small blocks in a square playfield. The player controls a paddle moving along one edge of the playfield, using an analog knob or a joystick (depending on the machine configuration).. A ball flies around the playfield and bounces off walls and the paddle. The player loses a life if the ball flies out of the playfield past their paddle (though in some cases, the game may give the ball back to the player if lost too quickly). The game ends when the player has lost all their lives.

One or more square "exits" are placed on the playfield, typically surrounded by colored blocks that the player must destroy by hitting them with the ball. Directing the ball into an exit causes all remaining blocks on the screen to self-destruct, awarding bonus points and advancing the game to the next level.

The game builds upon the Breakout genre by introducing numerous gameplay mechanics, including indestructible blocks, blocks that fly or parachute in to replace blocks that have been destroyed, power-ups, objects that change the ball's speed and trajectory, and guns that can shrink the player's paddle. Additionally, the player can put spin on the ball by hitting it while moving the paddle quickly, causing the ball to temporarily move in a curved trajectory.

In multiplayer games, players play in the same level simultaneously, each taking up a different edge of the playfield. Some levels may be skipped due to placement of exits. Periodically, a bonus round occurs where players compete directly against one another in an exact clone of Pong, where the winning player earns an extra life.

== Reception ==
RePlay reported Off the Wall to be the twelfth most-popular arcade game at the time.

== Legacy ==
Attempted home versions/ports of the game for the TurboGrafx-16 and the Game Gear were made, but this version was cancelled before these two made it to store shelves.
