= Mace: The Dark Age =

1997 video game

- Arcade flyer
- Developer: Atari Games (Note: Ported to Nintendo 64 by Midway Games)
- Publishers: Atari Games; Nintendo 64: NA: Midway Home Entertainment; EU: GT Interactive Software
- Producer: Robert V. Daly
- Designers: Loren Bryant; Roberto Rodriguez
- Programmer: Bruce Rogers
- Artist: Matt Harvey
- Composer: Richard Marriott
- Platforms: Arcade, Nintendo 64
- Release: Arcade: NA: March 1997; Nintendo 64: NA: September 30, 1997; EU: December 1997
- Genre: Fighting
- Modes: Single-player, multiplayer
- Arcade system: Atari/Midway Seattle

Mace: The Dark Age is a 1997 fighting video game developed and published by Atari Games for arcades, with a port for the Nintendo 64 later released by Midway. Like many fighting games of the time, its style is marked by extreme violence, with characters graphically slaying defeated opponents. Utilizing 3dfx Voodoo chips for the hardware, the game received attention for its cutting-edge graphics and turned Atari a profit in the arcades. Critical response to the gameplay was much less enthusiastic.

== Gameplay ==
Mace: The Dark Age's graphics were praised by many critics.

The game is similar to Bio F.R.E.A.K.S. and the Mortal Kombat series. As in Mortal Kombat, when a character wins both rounds, they can perform an execution move on the enemy.

Similar to its contemporary Dead or Alive, in lieu of ring-outs Mace: The Dark Age has arenas which are surrounded by dangerous terrain, causing damage to any character who goes out of bounds. An evade button allows characters to step backward or forward into the 3D environments.

== Plot ==
In the 12th century, a collection of nations called the Covenant of Seven send their best warriors to kill Asmodeus, a practitioner of the dark arts who wields the fabled Mace of Tanis. The Mace is imbued with necropotic energy, offering those who wield it a tantalizing promise of ever-lasting life and unbridled power. Leaders from the East Asia and Remaining European Free Nations sense that Asmodeus is plotting and send their own chosen hero warriors to eliminate him and his Covenant of The Seven before it is too late.

== Development ==
Mace: The Dark Age took roughly two years to develop. The developers created 30 characters, then narrowed them down to a lineup of 11 through focus groups of teenagers. The latest motion capture technology was used during the game's development. A member of the Atari team who happened to be in the Society for Creative Anachronism did all the motion capture acting.

The game was originally released on the arcade machines using the 3Dfx Voodoo graphics card, the same technology powering San Francisco Rush. The 3Dfx technology was cheaper to develop for than a proprietary system, and Atari used the savings to sell the game at a lower cost to arcade operators.

Besides the Nintendo 64 port, a PlayStation version of the game was also planned but never released.

== Reception ==
Reception

Aggregate score
Aggregator	Score
GameRankings	64% (N64)

Review scores
Publication	Score
Consoles +	85%
Computer and Video Games	3/5 (N64)
Edge	6/10
Electronic Gaming Monthly	6.5/10, 7.5/10, 6.5/10, 5.5/10
GameSpot	5.4/10 (N64)
IGN	7.1/10 (N64)
N64 Magazine	81% (N64)
Next Generation	3/5 (ARC); 2/5 (N64)

Although the arcade release of Mace: The Dark Age was a commercial success, the game garnered average critical reviews. Critics discussed the Nintendo 64 version in the context of the console's dismal fighting game library at the time, and claimed Mace was the best of them only by default; for example, Next Generation stated that "The best fighter to hit Nintendo 64, Mace: The Dark Age, would still get pounded into the ground by any PlayStation or Saturn fighter game." An exception was Jeff Gerstmann of GameSpot, who considered it inferior to Dark Rift, saying it "looks fantastic but still plays poorly." This was a common lament, as critics widely agreed that the game's graphics are excellent but the gameplay is mediocre due to issues such as uninteresting moves and rough controls. Kelly Rickards of Electronic Gaming Monthly elaborated, "The combos, while cool to look at (like everything else in this game), don't flow smoothly and only seem to work when much flail action is being performed. The whole feel of the control interface seemed to be locked in a yesteryear-zone, back when the 3-D fighting game pioneers were still perfecting their art."

In terms of visuals, Mace: The Dark Age was noted for stage interactions with elements such as water, and damaging areas such as lava. Next Generation reviewed the arcade version, stating that "Detail and depth on the order of a Virtua Fighter take years of development and practice, and Atari Games has a good start. Mace is a beautifully designed game with attractive characters and bodes well for Mace II." Electronic Gaming Monthly later commented that "If your local arcade had this machine in, then you probably took a close look at it at one point or another. ... It is clearly one of the most visually impressive fighting games around, boasting smooth animations and large, colorful characters."

Critics did praise the arena designs, particularly the interactive objects and danger zones, with GamePro, one of the few to give Mace a wholly positive review, applauding the "dynamic details that not only look great but add to the fun and playability of the game." Some also complimented the fatalities, while opinions on the soundtrack were wildly divergent. IGN and GamePro both remarked that it fit the mood of the game well, while Next Generation called it "awful" and Gerstmann said it was simply "decent". The quality of the conversion from arcade to N64 was considered good by most reviewers, though a number of them complained of bad frame rates. According to Matt Casamassina of IGN, "Possibly because of the attention to detail, character animation is sometimes choppy and, because of that, gameplay suffers."

In 2011, Complex included it on the list of ten "most blatant Mortal Kombat ripoffs", adding, "If anything, it was like a more brutal version of Soul Edge."
