= Gauntlet Legends =

1998 video game

- North American arcade flyer
- Developer: Atari Games
- Publishers: Atari Games: Arcade; WW: Atari Games; JP: SNK Nintendo 64; NA/PAL: Midway; JP: Epoch Co. Ltd. PlayStation, Dreamcast Midway
- Producer: Mike Hally
- Artist: Steve Caterson
- Composers: John Paul; Barry Leitch
- Series: Gauntlet
- Platforms: Arcade, Nintendo 64, PlayStation, Dreamcast
- Release: October 1998: Arcade; NA: October 1998; JP: December 1998 Nintendo 64; NA: September 29, 1999; PAL: December 1, 1999; JP: April 7, 2000 PlayStation; NA: March 30, 2000; PAL: June 28, 2000 Dreamcast; NA: June 6, 2000; PAL: July 21, 2000
- Genres: Hack and slash, dungeon crawl
- Modes: Single-player, multiplayer
- Arcade system: Midway Vegas

Gauntlet Legends is a 1998 hack and slash video game developed and published by Atari Games for arcades. It is a sequel to 1985's Gauntlet and 1986's Gauntlet II, and the final game in the Gauntlet series to be produced by Atari Games. It has many unusual features for an arcade game, including passwords and characters that can be saved, enabling players to play over the course of a long period.

The game was later ported to the Nintendo 64, PlayStation, and Dreamcast. In 2000, it was followed by Gauntlet Dark Legacy, which featured new characters and levels.

== Gameplay ==
In ages past, a corrupt mage named Garm used a set of Runestones to summon a demon named Skorne. However, Skorne crushed Garm and imprisoned his soul in the Underworld. Skorne, fearing the power of the Runestones, scattered them throughout the four realms, so that they could never be used against him. The player(s) must defeat the end bosses of each of the four kingdoms to obtain the four keys which allow access to the desecrated temple and be able to banish Skorne to the Underworld. While traveling through each realm, they must also collect the Thirteen Runestones from where they have been scattered. The complete set of Runestones allows them to pursue Skorne to the Underworld in order to finally destroy him. The players must find three rune stones on each kingdom in order to defeat Skorne in the Underworld (in the arcades only), and one from the battle grounds (home versions only). The initial arcade version had a contest by which the first 500 players to complete the game and send in the supplied validation code would win a free Gauntlet Legends shirt. This game will not end unless the player runs out of health.

A new aspect of the Gauntlet series is established in Legends: the ability to level up the player's character(s) as the game is played, increasing their abilities through experience earned by slaying enemies and acquiring treasure, similar to the character progression methods in many role-playing video games. The four primary attributes are:

- Strength - Determines damage dealt by physical attacks.
- Speed - Determines character movement and attack rates.
- Armor - Determines amount of damage character takes from enemy attacks.
- Magic - Determines the range and effectiveness of magic potion attacks

Attributes increase with each level attained; increases can also be purchased from the Items menu with gold acquired in gameplay.

The stock fantasy characters from the original Gauntlet return for Legends; as before, each has greater starting ability in a single attribute than their fellows.

- Warrior/Minotaur - Strength
- Wizard/Jackal/Sumner - Magic
- Archer/Tigress - Speed
- Valkyrie/Falconess - Armor

Character progression is saved through a password system; a player can progress all four characters to a maximum level of 99, and each of their attributes to a maximum of 999.

== Ports ==
The first home console port of Gauntlet Legends was released for the Nintendo 64 in September 1999 in North America. This port saw a European release by the end of the year, and it was the exclusive platform for the Japanese release in the following year, on April 7, 2000. It can support up to four players by using the Expansion Pak, or up to three when using the standard Jumper Pak. It requires a Controller Pak to save game progress, and it is compatible with the Rumble Pak.

Though it was originally planned to be released in 1999 alongside the Nintendo 64 version, the PlayStation port was released in 2000 for North America and Europe. Unlike the other versions, this release only supports one or two players, as it omitted multitap support.

The Dreamcast port was also released in 2000 for North America and Europe. It incorporated much of the features from Gauntlet Dark Legacy.

== Reception ==
Reception

Aggregate scores
Aggregator	Score		
Aggregator	Dreamcast	N64	PS
GameRankings	74%	71%	60%
Metacritic	N/A	N/A	59/100

Review scores
Publication	Score		
Publication	Dreamcast	N64	PS
AllGame	3/5	3.5/5	3.5/5
CNET Gamecenter	7/10	9/10	3/10
Electronic Gaming Monthly	6.83/10 (Note: Three critics of Electronic Gaming Monthly gave the Dreamcast version each a score of 8/10, 7/10, and 5.5/10.)	6/10	N/A
EP Daily	8/10	7.5/10	6.5/10
Game Informer	7.75/10	7/10	6.5/10
GameFan	72% (Note: In GameFan's viewpoint of the Dreamcast version, three critics gave it each a score of 69, 64, and 82.) (J.W.) 70%	N/A	N/A
GameSpot	4.2/10	4.3/10	3.9/10
GameSpy	8/10	N/A	N/A
Hyper	N/A	86%	N/A
IGN	8.4/10	7.7/10	7.2/10
N64 Magazine	N/A	81%	N/A
Next Generation	3/5	N/A	N/A
Nintendo Power	N/A	7.8/10	N/A
Official U.S. PlayStation Magazine	N/A	N/A	2.5/5

The arcade version received favorable reviews. Dan Elektro of GamePro said, "Overall, Gauntlet Legends takes advantage of the 3D space and uses it as much more than a gimmick. [...] Gauntlet deserved an update—and the legend has been treated with befitting respect." (Note: GamePro gave the arcade version two 4.5/5 scores for graphics and fun factor, and two 5/5 scores for sound and control.) In Japan, Game Machine listed the game in their March 1, 1999 issue as the sixth most-successful dedicated arcade game of the previous year.

The PlayStation version received "mixed" reviews according to the review aggregation website Metacritic. Greg Orlando of NextGen said of the Dreamcast version, "Four controllers and one Legends make for party-game excitement of the highest order."

Vicious Sid of GamePro said of the N64 version in one review, "Gauntlet Legends is not perfect by any stretch of the imagination, but it's an impressive port of a polished arcade game that manages to cram in some extra playability to boot. If role-playing with an arcade twist lights your fire, you'll combust with Gauntlet Legends." (Note: GamePro gave the Nintendo 64 version two 4/5 scores for graphics and control, 3.5/5 for sound, and 4.5/5 for fun factor in one review.) In another GamePro review, Ash said, "Die-hard fans of Gauntlet will especially want to own this game, but it's also a great one for gamers who love the idea of intense multiplayer action. It doesn't get much better than wasting line after line of grunts with a group of friends." (Note: GamePro gave the Nintendo 64 version 3.5/5 for graphics, 4/5 for sound, 4.5/5 for control, and 5/5 for fun factor in another review.) Boba Fatt later said that the PlayStation version "makes up for its crimes with a responsive, though complicated, interface and a strong two-player performance. Ultimately, this is a rental at best, unless you're a huge fan of the arcade version." (Note: GamePro gave the PlayStation version two 3/5 scores for graphics and fun factor, 2/5 for sound, and 3.5/5 for control.) Dan Elektro said in one GamePro review, "With all the hidden stuff and the reworked sections, Gauntlet Legends on the Dreamcast feels as fresh as a newly minted quarter." (Note: GamePro gave the Dreamcast version all 4.5/5 scores for graphics, sound, control, and fun factor in one review.) In another GamePro review, The D-Pad Destroyer said, "If you like mindless action, gather some friends and play Gauntlet Legends for a day or two. As long as you're not looking for depth, you'll enjoy walking thigh-deep in bad guys and knocking over barrels in a desperate quest for food." (Note: GamePro gave the Dreamcast version two 4/5 scores for graphics and control, and two 3.5/5 scores for sound and fun factor in another review.)

During the Academy of Interactive Arts & Sciences' 3rd Annual Interactive Achievement Awards, the Nintendo 64 version was nominated for the "Console Action Game of the Year" award, which went to Crazy Taxi. Likewise, the same console version was a nominee for CNET Gamecenter's 1999 "Nintendo 64" award, which went to Rayman 2: The Great Escape. It was also nominated for the "Best Console Multiplayer Game of the Year" at The Electric Playground's Blister Awards 1999, which went to You Don't Know Jack.

The game ranked 4th on NPD's list of top-selling Dreamcast Games based on units sold during the period of July 2 to 15 in 2000.
