= ThunderJaws =

1990 video game

- Developer: Atari Games
- Publishers: Atari Games; Domark (ports)
- Programmers: Russel Dawe; Natalie Burgess
- Artists: Susan McBride; Will Noble; Chuck Eyler; Kris Moser
- Composers: Don Diekneite; Brad Fuller
- Platforms: Arcade, Amiga, Amstrad CPC, Atari ST, Commodore 64
- Release: June 1990: Arcade; 1991: ports
- Genre: Run and gun
- Modes: Single-player, multiplayer

ThunderJaws is a run and gun video game released in arcades by Atari Games in 1990. Home ports by Domark were published in 1991.

== Plot ==
A secret agent is on a mission to stop the mad mutation experiments of deranged Madame Q, but is required to venture through the aquatic laboratories and bases to find and eliminate her.

== Gameplay ==
The platforming game has two types of gameplay throughout each stage. The first is an underwater zone, where the player dives and swims through the level and looks for an exit to reach the other type of gameplay; the base zone, where the player walks and jumps across platforms (similar to Rolling Thunder) until an important destination is reached.

The player is armed with a speargun to eliminate enemies but can acquire better weapons with limited ammo either found on the ground or randomly from an enemy killed. Enemies consist of divers, mutants and robots. At the end of various levels, the player is faced with a boss, defeated by repeatedly shooting its weak points.

== Reception ==
Reception

Review score
Publication	Score
Atari ST User	70% (Atari ST)

Award
Publication	Award
Crash	Crash Smash
