= Doctor Pong =

1975 video game

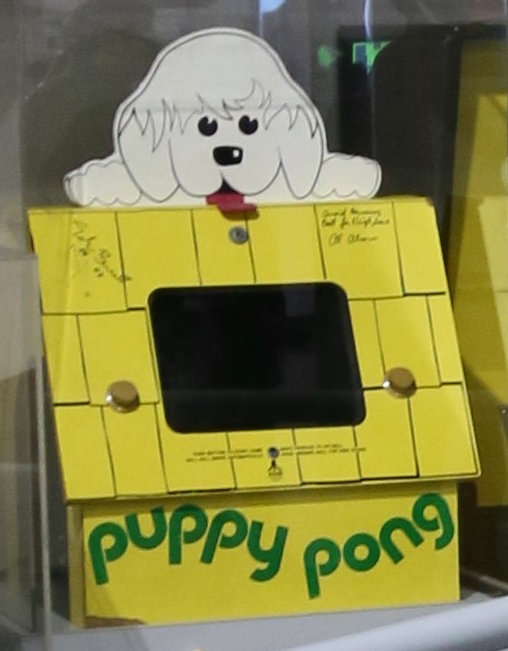
- Machine at the National Videogame Museum
- Developer: Atari, Inc.
- Publishers: Atari, Inc.
- Designers: Allan Alcorn; Nolan Bushnell; Steve Bristow
- Series: Pong
- Platform: Arcade
- Release: 1975-1977 (NA)
- Genre: Sports

Doctor Pong, also known as Puppy Pong, is an adaptation of the original arcade Pong for use in a non-coin-operated environment. It was conceptualized by Nolan Bushnell, Steve Bristow, and a marketing firm to move their arcade video games into a non-arcade environment—in this case, to help occupy children in pediatricians' waiting rooms. Originally designed to be a model of Snoopy's doghouse with Pong built into the side of it, when Charles Schulz declined Atari the use of Snoopy, the model was changed to a generic doghouse with a puppy looking over the top. Puppy Pong saw a limited production run and was tested at Chuck E. Cheese's Pizza Time Theatre's first two locations.

== Development ==
The original Snoopy Pong cabinet was designed by Regan Cheng of the Atari Industrial Design group. The follow-up Puppy Pong cabinet was designed by Regan's manager, Chas Grossman.

Both cabinets consisted of a doghouse housing a Pong board modified to not use a coin drop as a start trigger. The original Pong automatically starts several seconds after a coin is inserted. In Doctor Pong and Puppy Pong, a "start button" was instead wired up to start the games, set under the vertically mounted television in the dog house "roof." Instead of a traditional control panel, spinners are mounted directly on the roof, as well.
