= Space Lords =

1992 video game

- Developer: Atari Games
- Publisher: Atari Games
- Designer: Ed Logg
- Programmers: Ed Logg; Bob Flanagan
- Artist: Sam Comstock
- Composers: Don Diekneite; Brad Fuller
- Platform: Arcade
- Release: NA: November 1992
- Genre: Space combat
- Modes: Single-player, multiplayer
- Arcade system: Atari GX2

Space Lords is a video game released in arcades by Atari Games in 1992. It is a first-person perspective space combat video game.

It is a multiplayer game that can have up to two players per screen: a pilot (primary player) and a copilot (secondary player). Each cabinet has two screens. Two cabinets can be connected by a link cable for a total of four screens with potentially eight players. A single cabinet has a red ship on one screen and a green ship on the other. A second cabinet connected to the first has a blue ship and a yellow ship.

== Gameplay ==
To play, a player first starts the game as the pilot of the ship. A second player can then join as a co-pilot. The pilot controls the speed and direction of the ship as well as firing lasers and bombs across the screen. The "Hyperspace" control can be used to dodge such weapons. The co-pilot, if playing, can act as a gunner. The co-pilot has a targeting reticle used to fire off-center at targets of opportunity. The targeting reticle does not remain stationary relative to the player's ship, but stationary relative to the surroundings, which means that it goes to the edge of the screen as soon as the player's ship makes a turn if the co-pilot does not compensate. The addition of a co-pilot enables the "Cloak" button and adds one extra bomb and one extra hyperspace for the ship.

The ship's "hit points" are represented by "Energy", which slowly depletes as the game progresses, even if the player does nothing. Time, cloaking, and taking damage all deplete Energy. When the Energy bar reaches zero, the ship is destroyed, the defeated player loses one "life", and they return to the game's main menu. In the case of the ship being destroyed by enemy fire, the game announces what race or opposing player has killed the player. At the end of missions, Energy replenishes, but if a player wishes to stay alive they must destroy opposing ships to salvage Energy from them. Depending on the settings on individual machines, players start with anywhere from one (default) to four lives, with an additional life added for having a co-pilot. If the last life is lost, the player has an option to insert more credits to continue the game.

=== Controls ===
On each side of the game's cabinet is one throttle control with a button, a cyclic joystick for the pilot, and a single additional button for the pilot. In addition, there is another cyclic joystick for the co-pilot/gunner and two additional buttons. Each joystick has a trigger and thumb button. What they do differs depending on the player's role.

==== Pilot ====
Joystick: Flight control

Trigger: Fires forward laser as long as it is held.

Thumb button: Fires a bomb in whichever direction the viewpoint is facing.

Throttle: Speed control (ships follow inertial rules; simply releasing the throttle does not stop the ship); variable speed, forward and reverse.

Thumb button: Reverse view as long as button is held.

Hyperspace button: Press for rapid relocation to another spot in the arena; costs the ship one Hyperspace use.

Co-pilot
Joystick: Targeting reticle control; the gunner can shoot off-center at targets on the screen.
Trigger: Fires secondary laser in whichever direction the reticle is aiming as long as the trigger is held.
Thumb button: Fires a bomb in whichever direction the reticle is aiming.
Hyperspace button: Press for rapid relocation to another spot in the arena.
Cloak button: Makes the ship nearly impossible to see, at the cost of Energy. This button only works if a credit is inserted for a co-pilot.
Pressing Hyperspace and Cloak together: Both cloaks the ship and boosts its speed to roughly double normal speed, but at a drastic cost in Energy. This use of the Hyperspace button does not cost the ship a Hyperspace use.

== Setting ==
The game is played in an "arena". Each arena in the game is spherical and traveling long enough in one direction brings a player back to the spot they started from. Arenas have two environmental elements: nebulae and asteroids.

Players can hide in nebulae to be undetectable on opponent players' radars. The computer-controlled ships are also fooled by this. The player in the nebula, however, has his own radar jammed, so they can not see what is approaching. The nebulae does not stop lasers. When hiding like this, the player's Energy stores do not regenerate.

Asteroids are massive spheres of rock which stops a ship and deals damage in the process. They stop lasers (though not the blast radius of a bomb), and so are the only "cover" in the game.

== Modes ==
When the game begins, players choose whether they wish to fight head-to-head, cooperative against computer-controlled ships identical to the players', enter a general melee, fight through missions, or modify their ship. Defeated players need to add more credits in order to continue if they've lost all their lives.

In Team mode, up to four player-controlled ships enter the combat area and fight to the death, either against each other or against computer-controlled ships identical to the players' ships. Once all enemies are destroyed, the player(s) return to the main menu. The number of computer-controlled ships increase each time players defeat the Team arena and re-enter in the same game. A solo player may also fight the computer-controlled ships in this mode if they desire.

In the Melee mode, the player(s) are put into an arena with any number of the computer-controlled races (but no ships like the players' except those of the players themselves). In Melee mode, it is "every man for himself", with the computer-controlled races even fighting each other. Once a player enters the arena, they are there until they die; nothing else returns them to the main menu. Upon dying, if the player still has lives remaining, they may reenter the arena if they wish. Destroying the computer-controlled ships in this mode simply "spawns" more ships to fight.

In the Mission mode, a single player ship is made to fight the eight alien races. Each mission requires the player to kill a certain number of the enemy. The higher a player's overall score is, the more enemies he has to kill. Each alien race has certain attributes similar to the player's ship.

Attribute	Troids	Hydrus	Raptor	Octons	Noptera	Naqar	Krystar	Xyclops
Speed					X		X	X
Hyperspace		X						X
Bombs			X		X	X	X	X
Aft View				X			X	
Agility			X		X			X
Cloak						X		X

The first mission is against the easiest of the enemies, the Troids. They are slow, have no bombs, and no hyperspace capability. The next is against the Hydrus. Their tactics are similar to the Troids', but if the player fires a bomb at a Hydra squadron, it will Hyperspace away. Other enemies include the Raptors, who rely heavily on bombs of their own, the Octons, the Noptera, the Naqar, the Krystar (who are the fastest enemies in the game), and eventually the ultimate enemy race, the Xyclops. After each mission, the player returns to the main menu. Choosing "Missions" again from there takes the player to the next mission.

After facing each of the eight races in their own missions, in the next six missions two alien races team up, which the player fights simultaneously. The final mission pits the player against all eight races at once. Finishing that mission ends the game and, if the player's score is high enough, takes them to the high score board to enter their name. Only by playing through all 15 missions can a player enter his name on the high score board, even though scores are kept for all combat arenas.

== Features ==
In the "Modify" screen, a player can modify the number of bombs and "Hyperspace" uses he carries. The game imposes a 10-second time limit on modifications.

In the arenas, each enemy appears as a squadron of one to three ships. Destroying the last ship in a squadron (or a player-controlled ship) produces a power-up satellite which supplies more Energy, bombs, Hyperspace uses, or an extra life.

The game is programmed with a computer-generated voice, which serves as the player's on-board assistant, and often relays important alerts and messages.

Scoring is handled on a "ranking" basis. On a player's first life, each single kill is worth one rank point, with bonus kills for three or more simultaneous kills. Three alien ships destroyed at once yields a single bonus kill. The bonuses increase as more ships are killed with a single shot, up to the maximum of 56 bonus kills.

If a player continues the game after he loses their last life, they lose 20% of their total ranking and from that point on, each of their kills are worth less points. A player can finish the game after continuing several times, but would have a score around 300 or lower. Ranks are also granted based on the player's score. The ranks in the game are Cadet, Corporal, Lieutenant, Captain, Admiral, and Space Lord. The perfect score in the game (which yields the rank of "Space Lord") is 999.9.

== Reception ==
RePlay reported Space Lords to be the seventh most-popular upright arcade game at the time.
