= Road Runner (video game) =

1985 video game

- Arcade flyer
- Developers: Atari Games; Beam Software (NES)
- Publishers: Atari Games; Atari Corporation (2600); Tengen (NES); US Gold (ST)
- Director: Mike Hally
- Producers: Norm Avellar; Greg Rivera
- Programmers: Norm Avellar; Greg Rivera
- Artists: Susan McBride; Sam Comstock; Mark West
- Composers: Arcade; Hal Canon; Earl Vickers; NES; Gavan Anderson; Tania Smith
- Platforms: Arcade, Amstrad CPC, Atari 2600, Atari ST, Commodore 64, MS-DOS, ZX Spectrum, NES
- Release: 1985: Arcade; 1989: 2600, NES
- Genre: Racing
- Mode: Up to 2 Players
- Arcade system: Atari System 1

Road Runner is a racing video game based on the Wile E. Coyote and Road Runner shorts. It was released in arcades by Atari Games in 1985.

== Gameplay ==
Arcade screenshot

The player controls Road Runner, who is chased by Wile E. Coyote. In order to escape, Road Runner runs endlessly to the left. While avoiding Wile E. Coyote, the player must pick up bird seeds on the street, avoid obstacles like cars, and get through mazes. Most of the time Wile E. Coyote will just run after the Road Runner, but he occasionally uses tools like rockets, roller skates, and pogo sticks.

== Development ==
Originally, the game was set to be released as a LaserDisc game, with the game's graphics being overlaid over video footage showing the road and background scenery. Whenever the player managed to outwit the Coyote - such as tricking him into running off a cliff - a sequence from one of the original Road Runner shorts showing that exact situation would be played.

The game was going to be released in 1984, but Atari decided to cancel the game. In 1985, the game was released by Atari Games as a traditional video game. In the released game, all of the original LaserDisc-based elements were either removed or replaced with computer-generated graphics.

One prototype cabinet of this original LaserDisc version is known to still exist, and occasionally appears at arcade collector's conventions such as California Extreme.

== Music ==
The background music during attract mode and 4th level is "Sabre Dance" from Gayane by Aram Khachaturian, the 1st level music is "William Tell Overture" by Gioachino Rossini, 2nd level music is "Flight of the Bumblebee" by Nikolai Rimsky-Korsakov, and 3rd level is "Trepak" from The Nutcracker by Pyotr Ilyich Tchaikovsky.

== Ports ==
Road Runner was ported to the Amstrad CPC, Atari 2600, Atari ST, Commodore 64, MS-DOS, ZX Spectrum, and Nintendo Entertainment System. The Atari 2600 port was one of Atari Corporation's last games for the system, being released in 1989.

Like other NES games released by Tengen, Road Runner was unlicensed by Nintendo itself, released as an unlicensed cartridge avoiding Nintendo's protections.

== Reception ==
While stating that its challenging gameplay "should keep you entertained for hours on end", Gregg Pearlman of Antic in 1988 stated that the player should control Wile E. Coyote, not Road Runner: "In the cartoons, the coyote never wins; in the game, he never loses". Pearlman stated that he had destroyed two joysticks and "acquired unbelievable cramps in my hands and arms". The game was reviewed in 1988 in Dragon #140 by Hartley, Patricia, and Kirk Lesser in "The Role of Computers" column. The reviewers gave the game 3 out of 5 stars. The game went to number 2 in the UK sales charts, behind Exolon.
