= Road Riot 4WD =

1991 video game

- European arcade flyer
- Developers: Atari Games (Arcade), Equilibrium (SNES)
- Publishers: Arcade: Atari Games; Super NES: THQ
- Producer: Howard Phillips (SNES)
- Designers: David Akers; Mark Stephen Pierce; Dennis Harper
- Programmer: Dennis Harper (Arcade)
- Artists: Jim Wiebmer (SNES); Wilfredo Aguilar (SNES); Jody Sather (SNES); Mark Stephen Pierce (Arcade)
- Composers: Don Diekneite (Arcade); Ed Bogas; Gary Clayton (SNES)
- Platforms: Arcade, Atari Falcon030, Atari Lynx, Super NES
- Release: Arcade: NA: 1991; EU: 1991; Super NES: NA: November 1992; EU: 1992
- Genre: Racing
- Modes: Single-player; Multiplayer

Road Riot 4WD is an arcade racing game developed by Atari Games and originally released in 1991. In the game, players control weapon-equipped dune buggies and attempt to win races around the globe. A port of the game was released for the Super NES. Versions of the game for the Atari Lynx and Sega Genesis were developed, but never released. A sequel entitled Road Riot's Revenge was also in development and cabinets for the game were made, but the sequel never entered mass production.

== Gameplay ==
Players control four-wheel drive dune buggies equipped with weapons. After conquering the basic track, players will have to navigate through 11 additional tracks in order to win the championship. The locations are Saudi Arabia, Iowa, Africa, Swiss Alps, Baja Mexico, Antarctica, Ohio, Las Vegas, New Jersey, California and Australia. A player has to beat three vehicles in order to win the race. An infinite number of missiles is used to knock opponents out of the way. Crashing into certain obstacles will allow the player to collect extra points. The game is playable by up to two players, with a dual sit-down cabinet setup in the arcade or the always-on split screen of the SNES game.

If all 11 levels are completed, the player collects 500K points.

== Reception ==
In the United States, it topped the RePlay arcade charts for upright arcade cabinets in August 1991, and then dedicated cabinets in September 1991.
