= Road Burners =

1999 video game

- Arcade flyer
- Developer: Atari Games
- Publisher: Atari Games
- Producer: Mark Pierce
- Designers: Charlie Grisali; John Geraci
- Programmer: Charlie Grisali
- Artist: John Geraci
- Composer: Gunnar Madsen
- Platform: Arcade
- Release: April 1999
- Genre: Racing
- Arcade system: Atari/Midway Vegas

Road Burners is a 1999 motorcycle racing arcade game developed and released by Atari Games. It features a tilting motorcycle and the ability to be hooked to other like machines for up to 8 simultaneous players.

== Gameplay ==
The player's score is based upon the distance accumulated in the time limit. Players must pass checkpoints to earn additional time.

Tracks in the game include Washington, D.C., Paris, London, Las Vegas, and the Isle of Man.
