= Race Drivin' =

1990 video game

- Promotional flyer
- Developers: Atari Games (arcade); Argonaut Software (GB); Imagineering Inc. (SNES); Polygames (Genesis)
- Publishers: Atari Games (arcade); Domark; THQ (SNES, GB); Tengen (Genesis); Time Warner Interactive (SAT, PS)
- Designer: Rick Moncrief
- Programmer: Stephanie Mott
- Artists: Sam Comstock; Will Noble; Kris Moser; Deborah Short
- Composers: Don Diekneite (arcade); David Whittaker (GB); Mark Van Hecke (SNES)
- Platforms: Arcade, Amiga, Atari ST, MS-DOS, Game Boy, PlayStation, Genesis, Saturn, Super NES
- Release: August 1990: Arcade; NA: August 1990; EU: 1991 Atari ST 1991 MS-DOS 1992 SNES, Amiga; NA: October 1992 (SNES); EU: 1992 Game Boy; NA: January 1993; EU: 1993 Genesis; NA: November 1993 Saturn; JP: August 4, 1995 PlayStation; JP: June 28, 1996
- Genre: Driving simulation
- Modes: Single-player (or Two-player alternating or Two-player simultaneous, depending on game selection or configuration of machine)

Race Drivin' is a sim racing arcade video game released by Atari Games in August 1990. Players test drive several high-powered sports cars on stunt and speed courses. The game is the sequel to 1989's Hard Drivin' and was part of a new generation of games that featured 3D polygon environments. Unlike most racing games of its time, it attempted to model real world car physics in the simulation of the movement of the player's car. Like Hard Drivin', it includes a force feedback steering wheel, an ignition key, a four-speed shifter, and three foot pedals. Approximately 1200 arcade cabinets were produced for roughly US$9,000 (equivalent to $21,700 in 2024) each.

Home ports of Race Drivin' were released in the mid-1990s for the Super NES, Amiga, MS-DOS, Game Boy, PlayStation, Genesis, and Saturn. In 2005, it was included in the Midway Arcade Treasures 3 collection for the PlayStation 2, GameCube, and Xbox. An expanded port, Race Drivin' a Go! Go!, was released in Japan in 1996 for the PlayStation, developed and published by Time Warner Interactive.

== Gameplay ==
Screenshot exhibiting some of the enhanced stunts (dual landing ramps and the "jump loop")

The screen shows a first person perspective from inside the car, through the windshield. The car's dashboard is visible and displays the car's instruments, like the speedometer, tachometer and fuel level, as well as a few other functional but non-gameplay important ones, such as the oil, temp, and amp gauges and lights. Each car has its own unique dashboard.

There are three cars with manual transmission (speedster, roadster, and original), one automatic, and three tracks to choose from: the stunt track which is very similar to the one in Hard Drivin', the Autocross track, and the Super Stunt track.

The game consists of racing one or two laps around the player's chosen track within the allotted time. The gameplay and vehicle operation in Race Drivin' are very similar to Hard Drivin' and gameplay elements such as the Instant Replay and the off-road timer are still there.

A noticeable difference between the two games is the two new tracks are absent of any car traffic. Also, unlike Hard Drivin's original track that offers the driver two different driving paths, the two new tracks only offer one driving path per track. The finishing time of the original track shared by both games takes roughly 1:30 to complete. By comparison, the Autocross track is very short requiring roughly 30 seconds to complete and the Super Stunt track is considerably longer (taking roughly 3 minutes to complete). The Super Stunt track includes enhanced versions of the stunts in the original Hard Drivin' and new stunts entirely, like the corkscrew loop, the mountain road, the 45° inclined hill, and the cylindrical tunnel.

Like its predecessor, the game has an ignition key, a realistic manual transmission mode (which includes a 4-speed shifter with neutral and reverse, a clutch pedal, and the possibility of stalling the car should one mis-shift) and a force feedback steering wheel, in which the driver has to all properly operate as they would in a car in real life. The cockpit version of the game also includes an adjustable bucket seat and, if it is a 'Panorama' version (only 100 of which were made), it sports 3 to 5 monitors for a full 180° peripheral view.

Race Drivin' includes "Buddy Race", where a second player can race against a previous player's recorded performance, and "Linked Race", where by connecting a cable between two Race Drivin' cabinets, players can race each other simultaneously.

== Development ==
Race Drivin' has improved vehicle handling courtesy of a faster microprocessor and more efficient software. The TMS34010 used for car modeling in the original was replaced with an AT&T DSP32C which is faster and has floating point. Instead of modeling a car with only two wheels as Hard Drivin' did, Race Drivin' models a car with all four wheels.

Doug Milliken, who also worked on Hard Drivin', is credited as a "test driver", but actually worked as a consultant for developing the car model. This model was used to lay out the physics of the game's car. The arcade version of Race Drivin' was exhibited at the UK's Amusement Trades Exhibition International (ATEI) in 1991.

== Ports ==
Race Drivin' a Go! Go! is an expanded port that was released only in Japan for the PlayStation in 1996 developed and published by Time Warner Interactive. It includes the original Hard Drivin' course, the courses added in the original Race Drivin', and three new courses only found in this new version. The number of available vehicles was also increased from 3 to 8. The game includes both a single-player championship mode and an arcade time attack mode.

== Reception ==
Reception

Review scores
| Publication | Score |
|---|---|
| Electronic Gaming Monthly | 23/50 (Genesis) |
| GameSpot | 6.3/10 (XBOX) |
| Nintendo Power | 9.7/20 (SNES); 12.5/20 (Game Boy) |
| Super Play | 35% (SNES) |
| Sega Pro | 80% (Mega Drive) |

In North America, the arcade version was the top new video game on the RePlay arcade charts in October 1990, and then the top upright arcade cabinet from November 1990 through early 1991 to May 1991. Race Drivin' Panorama was later the top new arcade video game in August 1991.

Electronic Gaming Monthly gave the Genesis version 23 out of 50, calling it "another so-so entry in the driving scene" due to its "very choppy" scrolling.
