= Rezon (video game) =

1991 video game

- Arcade flyer
- Developer: Allumer
- Publisher: Taito
- Platform: Arcade
- Release: JP: September 1991
- Genre: Scrolling shooter
- Modes: Single-player, multiplayer

Rezon (Note: Japanese: レゾン, Hepburn: Rezon) is a 1991 horizontally scrolling shooter video game developed by Allumer and published by Taito for arcades. The first game to be developed by Allumer, it was only released in Japan in September 1991. Hamster Corporation acquired the game's rights alongside Allumer's catalogue, releasing the game outside Japan for the first time as part of their Arcade Archives series for the Nintendo Switch and PlayStation 4 in April 2023, and for Microsoft Windows, Nintendo Switch 2, PlayStation 5, and Xbox Series X/S as part of their Arcade Archives 2 series in November 2026.

== Gameplay ==
The player controls a spaceship which is tasked to handle an alien invasion. In a similar manner to Irem's R-Type, the player shoots down enemies alongside two mini spaceships which follow the player and assist in the attack. However, the angle of the shots from the mini spaceships can be angled as the player moves, allowing them to be used as shields.

== Reception ==
Damien McFerran of Time Extension and Chris Moyse of Destructoid criticized the game for being derivative to R-Type, noting that numerous level layouts and gameplay design were apparently copied verbatim from that game.
