= Atari Games =

American arcade game developer

Atari Games Corporation
- Logo used from 1996-1999
- Type: Private
- Industry: Video games
- Predecessor: Atari, Inc.
- Founded: January 11, 1985; 41 years ago
- Defunct: 1999; 27 years ago (as Atari name); February 7, 2003; 23 years ago (Company's dissolution)
- Fate: Acquired by Midway Games and reformed as Midway Games West; later closed by same company
- Headquarters: 675 Sycamore Drive, Milpitas, California, U.S.
- Key people: Hideyuki Nakajima (president, 1985–1994); Dan Van Elderen (president, 1995–2003); Ed Logg (game designer)
- Products: Gauntlet; Paperboy; Klax; Hard Drivin'
- Number of employees: 700
- Parent: Namco (1985–1987) (Note: Namco acquired majority ownership of Atari Games on February 5, 1985. Warner Communications and its successor, Time Warner, continued to own a minority interest in Atari Games after Warner sold controlling interest of the company to Namco. Warner did not fully divest itself of Atari Games until 1996.); Time Warner Interactive (1993–1996); Midway Games (1996–2003)
- Divisions: Tengen

Atari Games Corporation was an American producer of arcade video games, active from 1985 to 1999, then as Midway Games West Inc. until 2003. It was formed when the coin-operated video game division of Atari, Inc. was transferred by its owner Warner Communications to a joint venture with Namco, being one of several successor companies to use the name Atari.

The company developed and published games for arcades under the Atari brand, and across consumer home systems such as the Commodore 16, Commodore 64, Game Boy, Nintendo Entertainment System, and others using the Tengen label for legal reasons. Some of the games Atari Games had developed include Tetris, Road Runner, RoadBlasters, Primal Rage, Hard Drivin', and San Francisco Rush.

Atari Games effectively operated independently from 1987, when Namco sold its controlling stake, until 1994, when it was consolidated into Time Warner Interactive. In 1996, Atari Games was sold to WMS Industries, and the company then became part of Midway Games when that company was spun-off by WMS in 1998. After dropping the Atari name, it ceased operations in 2003; its former assets were later sold back to Warner Bros. Interactive Entertainment (now Warner Bros. Games) in 2009 following Midway's bankruptcy.

== History ==
When the Atari, Inc. division of Warner Communications lost $500 million in the first three quarters of 1983, its arcade coin-op division was the only one to make money. In 1984, Warner sold Atari's consumer products division to Jack Tramiel; he named this company Atari Corporation. Warner retained the coin-op division and a few other assets and changed the name of Atari, Inc. to Atari Games, Inc. The agreement between Tramiel and Warner Communications was that Atari Games must always include the "Games" after "Atari" on its logo and that Atari Games could not use the Atari brand at all in the consumer market (computers and home consoles). Atari Games retained most of the same employees and managers that had worked at the old Atari Inc. It was able to carry on with many of its projects from before the transition. Atari Corp., in contrast, froze projects and streamlined staff and operations. In 1985, Warner Communications and Namco jointly formed a new corporation, AT Games, Inc., and Warner transferred the coin-operated games division of Atari Games to the new corporate entity. Namco owned the controlling interest in the new company, while Warner retained 40%. Warner subsequently renamed Atari Games, Inc. to Atari Holdings, Inc., and AT Games became Atari Games Corporation. Namco later lost interest in operating Atari Games and sold 33% of its shares to a group of employees led by Hideyuki Nakajima, who had been the president of Atari Games since 1985. As the company was now split between three entities, Warner (40%), Namco (40%), and the employees (20%), and none of them held a controlling share, Atari Games effectively became an independent company. Atari Ireland was a subsidiary of Atari Games that manufactured its games for the European market; while under Namco, Atari Ireland also manufactured Sega's Hang-On (1985) for the European market.

Atari Games continued to manufacture arcade games and units, and starting in 1988, also sold cartridges for the Nintendo Entertainment System under the Tengen brand name. The Tengen name was used for its home consumer division that released games, while its home games were mainly developed by Atari Games staff. The companies exchanged a number of lawsuits in the late 1980s related to disputes over the rights to Tetris, of which Tengen had published a version for the NES, and Tengen's circumvention of Nintendo's lockout chip, which prevented third parties from creating unauthorized games. (Atari Games' legal battles with Nintendo were separate from those of Atari Corporation, which also exchanged lawsuits with Nintendo in the late 1980s and early 1990s.) The suit finally reached a settlement in 1994, with Atari Games paying Nintendo cash damages and use of several patent licenses.

Atari Games' logo used from 1985-1996

In 1989, Warner Communications merged with Time Inc., forming Time Warner. In 1994, Time Warner reacquired a controlling interest in Atari Games and made it a subsidiary of its Time Warner Interactive division. While the company initially maintained the Atari Games brand for arcade games under the new ownership, the Tengen brand was dropped in favor of the Time Warner Interactive label for its home console games. In mid-1994, the Atari Games, Tengen, and Time Warner Interactive Group names were all consolidated under the Time Warner Interactive banner.

On July 12, 1994, Nakajima died at the age of 64. Ed Logg, who was a chief programmer of Atari, briefly left the company for Electronic Arts, only to rejoin Atari Games in 1995 to run its home console games. Time Warner Interactive, via Atari Games became a member of the Nintendo Ultra 64's Dream Team in the mid-1990s.

In April 1996, after an unsuccessful bid by Atari co-founder Nolan Bushnell, the company was sold to WMS Industries, owners of the Williams, Bally and Midway arcade brands, which restored the use of the Atari Games name, while the home consumer division was folded into Williams Entertainment, with its existing home consumer division was kept. According to Atari Games president Dan Van Elderen, in 1995, Time Warner decided to exit the video game business and instructed the management at Atari Games to find a buyer for themselves, which surprised him because usually parent companies choose the buyers for their subsidiaries. Time Warner would not return to the video game business until the formation of Warner Bros. Interactive Entertainment on January 14, 2004.

On April 6, 1998, the video game assets of WMS Industries were spun off as a new independent company called Midway Games, which then gained control of the Atari Games division. Meanwhile, Hasbro Interactive acquired the Atari brand for the home market from JTS Corporation that same year. With the changes in ownership of the two companies, on November 19, 1999, Atari Games Corporation was renamed Midway Games West Inc., resulting in the Atari Games name no longer being used.

In 2001, Midway Games exited the arcade industry, due to a decline in the market. Despite this, Midway Games West continued to produce games for the home market until it was disbanded on February 7, 2003, after a slump in game sales. The studio's closure cost the jobs of 30 employees, including three members who had been with Atari since the 1970s. Two previously announced titles, Nitrocity and Gladiator: The Crimson Reign, were also cancelled in the process.

Although no longer in operation, Midway Games West continued to exist as a holding entity for the copyrights and trademarks of the games originally from Atari Games. In February 2009, Midway Games filed for Chapter 11 bankruptcy protection and in July 2009, most of Midway's assets were sold to Warner Bros. Interactive Entertainment, ultimately bringing all of the Atari Games properties back to Time Warner again.

== Games ==
=== Developed ===
Year	Title	Original platform(s)	Publisher	Co-developer
1985	Paperboy	Arcade, Acorn Electron, BBC Micro, Commodore 16, Plus/4, Commodore 64, TRS-80 Color Computer, ZX Spectrum, Amstrad CPC, Apple II, Apple IIGS, MS-DOS, NES, Amiga, Atari ST, Lynx, Game Boy, Master System, Game Gear, Genesis/Mega Drive, Game Boy Color, J2ME, Xbox Live Arcade, BlackBerry, iOS	Atari Games, Namco	Elite Systems (AE/BBCM/C16/C64/ZXS/CPC/AGA/ST), Kingsoft GmbH (CP/4), Mindscape (AII/IIGS), Magpie Computer Developments (DOS), Eastridge Technology (NES/GB), Al Baker & Associates (Lynx), Tiertex (MS/GG), MotiveTime (GEN), GameBrains (GBC), MoJive (J2ME), Digital Eclipse (XBLA), Vivid Games (iOS)
1985	Star Wars: The Empire Strikes Back	Arcade, Amiga, Amstrad CPC, Atari ST, BBC Micro, Commodore 64, ZX Spectrum	Atari Games	Vektor Grafx (AGA/CPC/ST/BBCM/C64/ZXS)
1985	Peter Pack Rat	Arcade, Amstrad CPC, Commodore 64, ZX Spectrum	Atari Games	Software Creations (CPC/C64/ZXS)
1985	Indiana Jones and the Temple of Doom	Arcade, Amstrad CPC, Commodore 64, MSX, ZX Spectrum, Atari ST, NES, Amiga, Apple II, MS-DOS	Atari Games	Paragon Programming (CPC/C64/ST/DOS), U.S. Gold (MSX), Mindscape (AII), Level Systems (AGA)
1985	Gauntlet	Arcade, Atari 8-bit, Amstrad CPC, Commodore 64, MSX, ZX Spectrum, Atari ST, MS-DOS, Apple IIGS, Apple II, NES, Mac, Master System, J2ME, Xbox Live Arcade	Atari Games	Gremlin Graphics (Atari 8-bit/CPC/C64/MSX/ZXS), Adventure Soft (ST), Mindscape (DOS/AII/IIGS), Sorcerer's Apprentice Software Productions (Mac OS), Tiertex (MS), TKO Software (J2ME), Digital Eclipse (XBLA)
1986	Super Sprint	Arcade, Amstrad CPC, Atari ST, Commodore 64, ZX Spectrum, NES	Atari Games	Catalyst Coders/Software Studios (CPC/C64/ZXS), State of the Art (ST)
1986	Road Runner	Arcade, Amstrad CPC, Atari ST, Commodore 64, ZX Spectrum, Atari 2600, MS-DOS, NES	Atari Games	Canvas Software (CPC/ST/C64/ZXS), Atari Corporation (2600), Banana Development (DOS), Beam Software (NES)
1986	Gauntlet II	Arcade, Amstrad CPC, Commodore 64, Atari ST, ZX Spectrum, Amiga, MS-DOS, NES, Game Boy, PlayStation Network	Atari Games	Gremlin Graphics (CPC/C64/ST/ZXS/AGA), Eastridge Technology (DOS/NES/GB), Backbone Emeryville (PSN)
1986	Championship Sprint	Arcade, Commodore 64, Amstrad CPC, ZX Spectrum, PlayStation Network	Atari Games	Catalyst Coders/Software Studios (C64/CPC/ZXS), Backbone Emeryville (PSN)
1986	720°	Arcade, Commodore 64, ZX Spectrum, Amstrad CPC, NES, Game Boy Color	Atari Games	Tiertex (C64/ZXS/CPC), Beam Software (NES/US C64), GameBrains (GBC)
1987	RoadBlasters	Arcade, Amiga, Amstrad CPC, Commodore 64, ZX Spectrum, Atari ST, NES, Lynx, Genesis/Mega Drive	Atari Games	Probe Software (AGA/ST), DJL Software (CPC/ZXS), Beam Software (NES), Atari Corporation (Lynx), Sterling Silver Software (GEN)
1987	APB	Arcade, Amiga, Amstrad CPC, Atari ST, Commodore 64, MS-DOS, ZX Spectrum, Lynx	Atari Games	Walking Circles (AGA/CPC/ST/C64/DOS/ZXS), Quicksilver Software (Lynx)
1987	Xybots	Arcade, Amiga, Amstrad CPC, Atari ST, Commodore 64, MSX, ZX Spectrum, Lynx	Atari Games	Teque Software Development (AGA/CPC/ST/C64/MSX/ZXS), NuFX (Lynx)
1988	Blasteroids	Arcade, Amiga, Amstrad CPC, Atari ST, Commodore 64, MS-DOS, MSX, ZX Spectrum	Atari Games	Teque Software Development (AGA/CPC/ST/C64/MSX/ZXS)
1988	Vindicators	Arcade, Amiga, Amstrad CPC, Atari ST, NES, ZX Spectrum, Commodore 64	Atari Games	Consult Computer Systems (AGA/C64), Consult Software (CPC/ST/ZXS), Westwood Associates (NES)
1988	Toobin'	Arcade, MSX, Amiga, Amstrad CPC, Atari ST, Commodore 64, MS-DOS, NES, ZX Spectrum, Game Boy Color	Atari Games	Teque Software Development (MSX/AGA/CPC/ST/C64/DOS/ZXS), Digital Eclipse (GBC)
1988	Cyberball	Arcade, Amiga, Amstrad CPC, Atari ST, Commodore 64, MS-DOS, Genesis/Mega Drive, ZX Spectrum, NES	Atari Games	Quixel (AGA/CPC/ST/C64/DOS/ZXS), Sega (GEN)
1989	Hard Drivin'	Arcade, Amiga, Amstrad CPC, Atari ST, ZX Spectrum, Genesis/Mega Drive, Lynx, Commodore 64	Atari Games	Teque Software Development (AGA), Binary Design (CPC/ZXS), Sterling Silver Software (GEN), NuFX (Lynx)
1989	Tetris	Arcade, NES	Atari Games	—N/a
1989	Vindicators Part II	Arcade	Atari Games	—N/a
1989	Escape from the Planet of the Robot Monsters	Arcade, Amiga, Amstrad CPC, Atari ST, Commodore 64, MS-DOS, SAM Coupé, ZX Spectrum	Atari Games	Teque Software Development (AGA/CPC/ST/C64/DOS/ZXS), Enigma Variations (SAM)
1989	Tournament Cyberball 2072	Arcade, Lynx, Xbox Live Arcade	Atari Games	BlueSky Software (Lynx), Digital Eclipse (XBLA)
1989	S.T.U.N. Runner	Arcade, Amiga, Amstrad CPC, Atari ST, Commodore 64, MS-DOS, ZX Spectrum, Lynx	Atari Games	The Kremlin (AGA/AST/C64/DOS), Mind's Eye (CPC/ZXS), Atari Corporation (Lynx)
1989	Skull & Crossbones	Arcade, NES, Amiga, Amstrad CPC, Atari ST, Commodore 64, MS-DOS, ZX, Spectrum	Atari Games	Walking Circles (AGA/CPC/ST/C64/DOS/ZXS)
1990	Badlands	Arcade, Amiga, Atari ST, Commodore 64, ZX Spectrum, Amstrad CPC	Atari Games	Teque London (AGA/ST/C64/ZXS/CPC)
1990	Klax	Arcade, Amiga, Amstrad CPC, Atari 2600, Atari ST, BBC Micro, Commodore 64, MS-DOS, Game Boy, Lynx, MSX, NES, PC-88, PC-98, SAM Coupé, X68000, TurboGrafx-16, ZX Spectrum, Genesis/Mega Drive, Master System, Game Gear, Game Boy Color	Atari Games, Namco	Teque Software Development (AGA/CPC/ST/C64/DOS/MSX/ZXS), A.C.P. (BBCM), Atari Corporation (2600/Lynx), Hudson Soft (PC-88/PC-98/X68K), ICE Software (SAM), Tengen Ltd. (TG-16), Eastridge Technology (GB), Tiertex (MS/GG), Digital Eclipse (GBC), Namco (Japanese SMD)
1990	Hydra	Arcade, Amstrad CPC, Amiga, Atari ST, Commodore 64, ZX Spectrum, Lynx	Atari Games	Moonstone Computing (CPC/ZXS), ICE Software (AGA/ST/C64), NuFX (Lynx)
1990	ThunderJaws	Arcade, Amiga, Amstrad CPC, Atari ST, Commodore 64	Atari Games	The Kremlin (AGA/CPC/ST/C64)
1990	Pit-Fighter	Arcade, Amiga, Amstrad CPC, Atari ST, Commodore 64, MS-DOS, Super NES, ZX Spectrum, Genesis/Mega Drive, Lynx, Game Boy, Master System	Atari Games	Teque London (AGA/CPC/ST/C64/ZXS), Oxford Mobius (DOS), Eastridge Technology (SNES/GB), Sterling Silver Software (GEN), Al Baker & Associates (Lynx), The Kremlin (MS)
1990	Race Drivin'	Arcade, Amiga, Atari ST, MS-DOS, Super NES, Game Boy, Genesis, Saturn	Atari Games	Walking Circles (AGA/ST/DOS), Imagineering (SNES), Argonaut Software (GB), Polygames (GEN), Time Warner Interactive (SS)
1990	R.B.I. Baseball 2	Nintendo Entertainment System, Commodore 64, DOS, Amiga, Amstrad CPC, ZX Spectrum	Tengen	The Kremlin (C64/AGA/CPC/AST/ZXS), Novotrade International (DOS)
1990	Shuuz!	Arcade	Atari Games	—N/a
1991	Rampart	Arcade, Amiga, Atari ST, Commodore 64, MS-DOS, Master System, NES, Genesis/Mega Drive, Super NES, Game Boy, Lynx, Game Boy Color	Atari Games	The Kremlin (AGA/ST/C64), Bitmasters (DOS/NES/SNES), Punk Development/Developer Resources (MS), Silicon Sorcery (GEN), C-lab. (GB), Atari Corporation (Lynx), Digital Eclipse (GBC)
1991	Batman	Arcade	Atari Games	—N/a
1991	Race Drivin' Panorama	Arcade	Atari Games	—N/a
1991	R.B.I. Baseball 3	Nintendo Entertainment System, Genesis/Mega Drive	Tengen	—N/a
1991	Road Riot 4WD	Arcade, Super NES, Atari Falcon	Atari Games	Equilibrium (SNES), Images Software (Falcon)
1991	Steel Talons	Arcade, Lynx, Genesis/Mega Drive, Super NES, Atari Falcon	Atari Games	NuFX (Lynx), Polygames (GEN), Panoramic Software (SNES), Atari Corporation (Falcon)
1991	Off the Wall	Arcade	Atari Games	—N/a
1992	Relief Pitcher	Arcade, Super NES	Atari Games	Eastridge Technology (SNES)
1992	Guardians of the 'Hood	Arcade	Atari Games	—N/a
1992	Moto Frenzy	Arcade	Atari Games	—N/a
1992	RBI Baseball 4	Genesis/Mega Drive	Tengen	—N/a
1992	Space Lords	Arcade	Atari Games	—N/a
1993	Awesome Possum Kicks Dr. Machino's Butt	Genesis/Mega Drive	Tengen	—N/a
1993	Dragon's Revenge	Genesis/Mega Drive	Tengen	—N/a
1993	Paperboy 2	Genesis/Mega Drive	Tengen	—N/a
1993	RBI Baseball '93	Genesis/Mega Drive	Tengen	—N/a
1994	Dick Vitale's "Awesome, Baby!" College Hoops	Genesis/Mega Drive	Time Warner Interactive	—N/a
1994	T-MEK	Arcade, 32X, MS-DOS	Atari Games	Bits Corporation (32X/DOS)
1994	Primal Rage	Arcade, Game Boy, Game Gear, MS-DOS, Genesis, Super NES, 3DO, 32X, Jaguar CD, PlayStation, Saturn, Amiga	Time Warner Interactive	Probe Entertainment (GB/GG/GEN/3DO/32X/JAG CD/PS/SS/AGA), Teeny Weeny Games (DOS), Bitmasters (SNES)
1994	RBI Baseball '94	Genesis/Mega Drive, Game Gear	Tengen	Al Bakser & Associates (GG)
1995	RBI Baseball '95	32X	Time Warner Interactive	—N/a
1995	Time Warner Interactive's VR Virtua Racing	Saturn	Time Warner Interactive	—N/a
1995	Wayne Gretzky and the NHLPA All-Stars	Genesis, Super NES, MS-DOS	Time Warner Interactive	Cygnus Multimedia Productions (SNES), Semi Logic Entertainments (DOS)
1996	Wayne Gretzky's 3D Hockey	Arcade, Nintendo 64	Atari Games	—N/a
1996	San Francisco Rush: Extreme Racing	Arcade, Nintendo 64, PlayStation	Atari Games	Climax Entertainment (PS)
1997	Mace: The Dark Age	Arcade, Nintendo 64	Atari Games	—N/a
1997	San Francisco Rush the Rock: Alcatraz Edition	Arcade, Windows	Atari Games	Karma Entertainment (WIN)
1998	California Speed	Arcade, Nintendo 64	Atari Games	—N/a
1998	Gauntlet Legends	Arcade, Nintendo 64, PlayStation, Dreamcast	Atari Games, SNK	Midway Games West (PS/DC)
1998	Rush 2: Extreme Racing USA	Nintendo 64	Midway Games	—N/a
1999	War Final Assault	Arcade	Atari Games	—N/a
1999	Road Burners	Arcade	Atari Games	—N/a
1999	San Francisco Rush 2049	Arcade, Nintendo 64, Dreamcast, Game Boy Color	Atari Games	Midway Games West (N64/DC), Handheld Games (GBC)

==== As Midway Games West ====
Year	Title	Original platform(s)	Publisher	Co-developer
1999	Hydro Thunder	Arcade	Midway Games West	Midway San Diego
2000	Skins Game	Arcade	Midway Games West	
2000	Gauntlet Dark Legacy	Arcade, PlayStation 2, Xbox, GameCube	Midway Games West	
2000	San Francisco Rush 2049	Nintendo 64, Dreamcast	Midway Games West	Hand Held Games (GBC)
2002	Dr. Muto	PlayStation 2, Xbox, GameCube	Midway Games West	Digital Eclipse (GBA)

=== Published ===
Year	Title	Original platform(s)	Developer	Co-Publisher	Ref.
1987	Rolling Thunder	Arcade, Commodore 64, Amiga, Amstrad CPC, Atari ST, Nintendo Entertainment System, ZX Spectrum	Namco	Namco, U.S. Gold (C64/AGA/CPC/ST/ZX), Tengen	
1987	Dunk Shot	Arcade	Sega	Sega	
1987	Dragon Spirit	Arcade, X68000, TurboGrafx-16, Amiga, Amstrad CPC, Commodore 64, Nintendo Entertainment System, ZX Spectrum, Atari ST, MS-DOS	Namco	Namco, Micomsoft (X68K), NEC (TG-16), Domark (AGA/CPC/C64/ZXS/ST/DOS), Bandai (NES)	
1987	R.B.I. Baseball	Arcade, Nintendo Entertainment System	Namco	Namco, Tengen	
1987	Pac-Mania	Arcade, Amiga, Amstrad CPC, Atari ST, Commodore 64, MSX, ZX Spectrum, X68000, NES, Acorn Archimedes, Master System, Genesis/Mega Drive, BREW, J2ME, Zeebo	Namco	Namco, Grandslam Interactive (AGA/CPC/ST/C64/MSX/ZXS), Micomsoft (X68K), Tengen (NES/GEN), Domark (AA), TecMagik (MS)	
1988	Galaga '88	Arcade, TurboGrafx-16, X68000, i-mode, EZweb	Namco	Namco, NEC (TG-16), Micomsoft (X68K)	
1988	Final Lap	Arcade, Famicom	Namco	Namco, Namcot (FC)	
1988	Assault	Arcade	Namco	Namco	
1989	Four Trax	Arcade, Sega Mega Drive	Namco	Namco	
1990	Mad Dog McCree	Arcade, 3DO Interactive Multiplayer, DVD, iOS, Windows, Nintendo 3DS, Philips CD-i, PlayStation Network, Sega CD, Wii	American Laser Games	CapDisc (CD-i), Digital Leisure (iOS/Windows/Wii), Engine Software (3DS)	
1993	Knuckle Bash	Arcade	Toaplan	Toaplan	
1993	World Rally	Arcade	Zigurat Software	Gaelco, Sigma	
1994	Cops	Arcade	Nova Production	—N/a	
1995	Area 51	Arcade, Windows, Saturn, PlayStation	Mesa Logic	Time Warner Interactive, Midway Games, SoftBank, GT Interactive, Tectoy	
1997	Maximum Force	Arcade, PlayStation, Saturn, Windows	Mesa Logic	SNK, Midway Games, GT Interactive	
1997	Surf Planet	Arcade	Zigurat Software	Gaelco	
1998	Radikal Bikers	Arcade, PlayStation	Gaelco	Gaelco, SNK, Infogrames (PS)	
1998	Vapor TRX	Arcade	Atari Games	Blue Shift	
1998	Area 51: Site 4	Arcade	Mesa Logic	—N/a	

=== Cancelled ===
Title	Genre	Publisher(s)	Planned Release Date/Last Year Developed or Mentioned	Notes/Reasons					
Title	Genre	Publisher(s)	Planned Release Date/Last Year Developed or Mentioned	Notes/Reasons	Accelerator	Racing	Atari Games	1988	Two-player split-screen racing game.
Arcade Classics	Compilation	Atari Games	1992	Enhanced compilations of Centipede and Missile Command.					
Battle Mech	Fighting	Atari Games	1992	Artwork under ownership of former Accolade artist Stu Shepherd.					
Beat Head	Puzzle	Atari Games	1993	Tile-matching puzzle game.					
Beavis and Butt-Head	Beat 'em up	Midway Games	April 9, 2016	Based upon MTV's eponymous animated series. Runs on a 3DO Interactive Multiplayer-related hardware.					
BMX Heat	Racing	Atari Games	1991	Motorcycle racing game.					
BloodLust I.K.3	Fighting	Atari Games/Midway Games West	1998-02	Sequel to International Karate + developed by System 3. Runs on a PC-based hardware.					
Cyberstorm	Fighting	Midway Games	March 23, 2018	Street Fighter II-styled mecha fighting game. Cancelled due to poor aesthetics and animations. Playtested at a Golfland amusement center.					
Danger Express	Run and gun	Atari Games	1992	Discontinued after location testing.					
Fishin' Frenzy	Fishing	Time Warner Interactive	1995	Playtested but full production was scrapped due to lack of earnings. Runs on COJAG hardware.					
Freeze	Puzzle	Atari Games/Midway Games	1996-12	Showcased at the 1996 AMOA show. Runs on COJAG hardware.					
Gladiator: The Crimson Reign		Midway Games West	2002	Cancelled when the studio shut down.					
Guts and Glory	Shoot 'em up	Atari Games	1989	Two-player war-themed shoot 'em up game.					
Hard Drivin's Airborne	Racing	Atari Games	1993	Sequel to Hard Drivin' II: Drive Harder.					
Hot Rod Rebels	Racing	Midway Games West	2000	Sequel to San Francisco Rush 2049. Runs on a PC-based hardware.					
Marble Man: Marble Madness II	Platform, Racing	Midway Games	September 11, 2008	Sequel to Marble Madness.					
Metal Maniax	Vehicular combat	Atari Games	1994	Development was scrapped due to lack of popularity among arcade players.					
Meanstreak	Racing, Vehicular combat	Midway Games	January 15, 2008	Vehicular combat racing game.					
Nitrocity		Midway Games West	2002	Cancelled when the studio shut down.					
Police Academy	Platformer	Tengen	1991	NES platformer game.					
Primal Rage II	Fighting	Midway Games	March 23, 2018	Sequel to Primal Rage.					
Road Riot's Revenge Rally	Racing	Atari Games	1993	Sequel to Road Riot 4WD.					
Space Hero	Adventure	Tengen	1992	Genesis					
Sparkz	Puzzle	Atari Games	1992	Grid-based puzzle game.					
Street Drivin'	Racing	Atari Games	1993	Sequel to Hard Drivin's Airborne.					
Tenth Degree	Fighting	Midway Games	March 23, 2018	3D fighting game developed by former Capcom employees.					
Vicious Circle	Fighting	Midway Games	October 18, 2020	Killer Instinct-styled fighting game. Runs on COJAG hardware.					
