= Brad Fuller (composer) =

American video game composer

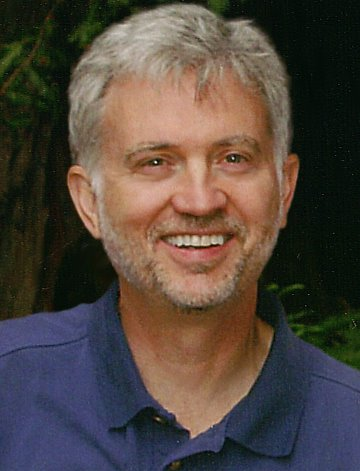
- Born: November 5, 1953; Indianapolis, Indiana, U.S.
- Died: January 2, 2016 (aged 62); San Jose, California, U.S.
- Occupation: video game composer

Brad Allen Fuller (November 5, 1953 – January 2, 2016) was an American video game composer known for his work for Atari, Inc. and Atari Games.

Fuller composed the soundtracks for Marble Madness, released by Atari Games in 1984, Blasteroids, released in 1987, and Tengen Tetris, which was originally released in 1988. He also served as the Director of Audio of Atari, in which he oversaw all of the company's soundtracks and music for its video games. Fuller was promoted to Director of Engineering in 1993. He remained at Atari until his departure in 1996.

Fuller was born in Indianapolis, Indiana, on November 5, 1953. He studied jazz at both the Berklee College of Music in Massachusetts and Indiana University Bloomington.

Fuller had originally began his career at Atari as an audio engineer in 1982. He engineered the audio for a number of Atari, Inc.'s titles, including the Atari 8-bit computer ports of Donkey Kong and Robotron: 2084.

In 1996, Fuller left Atari to become to join Matter to Magic Studios as a partner. He then worked at OpenTV, a software technology company focusing on digital television, for three years. Fuller departed OpenTV to establish Sonaural Audio Studios, a video game audio development firm.

In 2002, Fuller received a Master of Science in technology management from Pepperdine University. In later life, he worked to advance 3D capture. He also taught at Cogswell Polytechnical College in Sunnyvale, California.

== Death ==
Fuller, a resident of San Jose, California, died from pancreatic cancer on January 2, 2016. He was survived by his wife, Rebecca, and two sons, Jeff and Kevin.
