= Gauntlet =

Gauntlet or the gauntlet may refer to:

== Common uses ==
- Gauntlet (glove), protective gloves used as a form of armor
- Running the gauntlet, a form of physical punishment

== Arts, entertainment, and media ==
=== Fictional characters ===
- Gauntlet (comics), a Marvel Comics superhero
- Gauntlet (Inhuman), a Marvel Comics supervillain
- Crawford, a.k.a. The Gauntlet, a recurring villain of the Disney animated series Teamo Supremo

=== Games ===
- Gauntlet (1985 video game), a 1985 four-player arcade game with many followups:
  - Gauntlet II, a 1986 arcade sequel
  - Gauntlet: The Third Encounter, a 1990 game for the Atari Lynx
  - Gauntlet III: The Final Quest, a 1991 home computer game
  - Gauntlet IV, a 1994 video game for the Sega Genesis
  - Gauntlet Legends, a 1998 arcade game
  - Gauntlet Dark Legacy, a 2000 arcade game
  - Gauntlet: Seven Sorrows, a 2005 video game
  - Gauntlet (2014 video game), developed by Arrowhead Game studios
  - Gauntlet (Nintendo DS), an unreleased remake of the first game
- Gauntlet (Donald R. Lebeau video game), a 1984 shoot 'em up game for Atari 8-bit computers
- Gauntlet (Micro Power video game), a 1984 Defender clone
- The Gauntlet (module), an adventure module for Dungeons & Dragons
- The Gauntlet (AutoVentures), a 1986 tabletop game supplement for Car Wars
- The Gauntlet (tabletop games producer), a publisher/producer of tabletop role-playing games and podcasts

=== Television ===
==== Series ====
- Real World/Road Rules Challenge: The Gauntlet (2003–2004), an MTV reality television game show series
- Real World/Road Rules Challenge: The Gauntlet II (2005–2006), an MTV reality television game show series
- Real World/Road Rules Challenge: The Gauntlet III (2008), an MTV reality television game show series
- The Gauntlet, the subtitle given to Mystery Science Theater 3000 season 12

==== Episodes ====
- "Gauntlet", a 1999 episode of Earth: Final Conflict
- "Gauntlet", a 2014 episode of Legends
- "Gauntlet" (Stargate Universe), a 2011 episode of Stargate Universe
- "Gauntlet", a 2012 episode of XIII: The Series
- "The Gauntlet", a 2008 episode of Ben 10: Alien Force
- "The Gauntlet", a 1986 episode of Captain Harlock and the Queen of a Thousand Years
- "The Gauntlet", a 1967 episode of Combat!
- "The Gauntlet", a 1967 episode of Custer
- "The Gauntlet", a 2015 episode of Face Off
- "The Gauntlet", a 1995 episode of Hercules: The Legendary Journeys
- "The Gauntlet", a 1985 episode of MacGyver
- "The Gauntlet", a 1994 episode of Phantom 2040
- "The Gauntlet", a 1987 episode of Spiral Zone
- "The Gauntlet" (Supergirl), a 2021 episode of Supergirl
- "The Gauntlet", a 2012 episode of Teenage Mutant Ninja Turtles
- "The Gauntlet", a 2002 episode of The Agency
- "The Gauntlet", a 1967 episode of The Virginian
- "The Gauntlet", a 2011 episode of Top Shot

=== Literature ===
- A Gauntlet (Norwegian: En hanske), an 1883 novel by Bjørnstjerne Bjørnson
- The Gauntlet, a 1945 novel by James H. Street
- The Gauntlet (novel), a 1951 children's book written by Ronald Welch
- Gauntlet, the first installment in the series Star Trek: Stargazer, a 2002 novel by Michael Jan Friedman
- Iron Man: The Gauntlet, a 2016 children's book written by Eoin Colfer

=== Other uses in arts, entertainment, and media ===
- Gauntlet (newspaper), published by students at the University of Calgary
- "The Gauntlet" (comics), a Spider-Man storyline
- The Gauntlet (film), a 1977 film starring Clint Eastwood and Sondra Locke
- RVR-01 "Gauntlet", a fighter craft in the game Thunder Force V

== Sports ==
- Gauntlet for the Gold, a professional wrestling match type exclusive to TNA Wrestling
- Gauntlet match, a professional wrestling match type

== Other uses ==
- Gauntlet (body piercing studio), a former California-based company, closed in 1998
- Gauntlet track, a type of railroad track
- Gloster Gauntlet, a British biplane
- SA-15 "Gauntlet", a Soviet surface-to-air missile
