= Happy Trails (video game) =

1983 video game

- Developer(s): Activision
- Publisher(s): Activision
- Programmer(s): Carol Shaw
- Platform(s): Intellivision
- Release: 1983
- Genre(s): Puzzle
- Mode(s): Single-player, multiplayer

Happy Trails is a video game programmed by Carol Shaw for the Intellivision console and released by Activision in 1983. The player must navigate a character through a broken maze to collect gold. Shaw previously wrote River Raid for the Atari 2600.

Happy Trails is a clone of the 1982 Konami arcade game Loco-Motion. Mattel was working on an official port, but Happy Trails was published first, resulting in Loco-Motion being sold at a discount and without any marketing support.

== Reception ==
Joystik magazine wrote, "This is a great game. The strategic possibilities are seemingly endless," giving an overall rating of 5 out of 5 stars.

== Reviews ==
- Games #44
