= Othello (1981 video game) =

1981 video game for the Atari 2600

- Developer: Atari, Inc.
- Publishers: Atari, Inc.
- Programmers: Ed Logg; Carol Shaw
- Platform: Atari 2600
- Release: March 1981
- Genre: Strategy
- Modes: Single-player, multiplayer

Othello is a 1981 video game developed and published by Atari, Inc. for its Atari Video Computer System (later called the Atari 2600). It is based on the variant of Reversi of the same name, originally created in 1971. The VCS game was programmed by Ed Logg and Carol Shaw.

== Gameplay ==
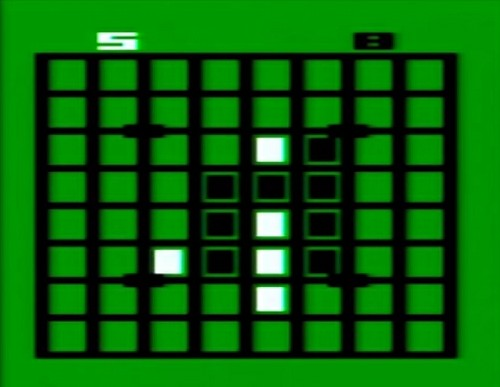
Gameplay screenshot

The game broadly resembles the game originally developed by Parker Brothers in that it is set on an 8x8 board on which the player must capture squares by sandwiching their opponent's counters between their own. The game has four skill levels. Both one-player and competitive two-player modes are included in the game. The player can create their own problem by depositing pieces on the board, and select whether to go first or not.

== Development ==
The game was programmed by Ed Logg, who had studied artificial intelligence at the Stanford University AI Lab, and Carol Shaw, who later created River Raid. Shaw programmed the visuals for Othello. The cover-art for the cartridge was created by Steve Hendricks.

== Reception ==
A review in the Autumn 1983 edition of UK magazine TV Gamer criticised the AI, saying that, "the computer can manage only average ability even at its highest level of play", and that by that point the game was showing its age, but also said that the game would suit those who enjoyed that kind of strategy game. Electronic Games editors Arnie Katz and Bill Kunkel assessed the game as "moderately challenging", calling the AI a "fair", if "unexceptional", opponent. Conversely, a review in the 1983 Book of Atari Software described the game as "sophisticated and challenging" and gave the game a rating of "A" overall.

A review in the January 1983 issue of Tilt, the French video-games magazine, was broadly positive, particularly praising the ability to set up a problem before starting the game as an advantage over other electronic games of Othello, though it noted that the "expert" difficulty setting merely equated to the level of a good beginner. Conversely, a review in the Autumn 1983 issue of Creative Computing Video & Arcade Games was praising of the AI, describing the opponent on "Expert" setting as "capable of beating the pants off of you".

== See also ==
- List of Atari 2600 games
