= Guttang Gottong =

1982 video game

- North American arcade flyer (with the Japanese name)
- Developer: Konami
- Publishers: JP: Sega; NA: Centuri; NA: Konami (after reacquiring rights)
- Platforms: Arcade, Intellivision, Tomy Tutor, MSX
- Release: JP: March 1982; NA: April 1982
- Genre: Puzzle
- Modes: Single-player, multiplayer

Guttang Gottong (Note: Japanese: ガッタンゴットン), initially released in North America as Loco-Motion, is a 1982 puzzle video game developed by Konami and published by Sega for arcades. It was released in Japan in March 1982 and North America in April 1982. Centuri released the game in North America before Konami reacquired the rights to release it under its Japanese name. The player builds a path for their unstoppable locomotive by moving tracks which will allow it to pick up passengers.

The game was ported to Intellivision, the Tomy Tutor, and–under a different name–MSX. A clone programmed by Carol Shaw of Activision, Happy Trails, was published for Intellivision before the official version was released. A sequel, Cue Brick, was released in 1989.

== Gameplay ==
Gameplay screenshot

Guttang Gottong is an updated version of a sliding block puzzle game in which the player can move tiles horizontally or vertically within a rectangular frame that contains one empty square. The tiles are sections of railroad track and the player must use them to construct a path for a locomotive that never stops moving. Laid out around the edges of the frame are stations with passengers that must be picked up.

The player uses a joystick to slide a piece of the track into the vacant square and can use a button to accelerate the locomotive, but it is always in motion and cannot be stopped. The player must avoid running into a dead-end barricade, a barrier at the playfield edge or the edge of the empty square; doing so costs one life. As the player moves the pieces of track around, the route the locomotive will take is highlighted in yellow up to any dead end. A countdown timer occasionally appears on a station. If passengers are waiting there and the player picks them up before the countdown reaches zero, the remaining amount is added to the score as bonus points. If not, the passengers send a "Crazy Train" onto the tracks and the player must avoid crashing into it. If a countdown timer at an unoccupied station reaches zero, the station is destroyed and becomes a pair of barrier squares. Crazy Trains can be crashed into each other to destroy them, but doing so creates a new pair of dead ends or destroys a station if the collision happens within it.

On higher levels, there are special pieces of the track that have one entrance and three different exits. If the locomotive's path includes one of these sections, the exit will be randomly determined. The player earns bonus points for every such section crossed. A level is cleared when there are no more passengers to pick up, and the player then moves onto the next level which is a different layout, bigger or smaller with more dead ends. Also, the bonus stations appear more frequently and, on later levels, one or more Crazy Trains will be on screen at the outset. If the player creates a closed loop of track and rides on it for several seconds, a "Loop Sweeper" appears which moves around the loop behind it. If the Sweeper reaches the locomotive, the player loses a life. Sweepers can be crashed into each other or into Crazy Trains to destroy them with the same consequences as above. An extra life is awarded at 10,000 points. Bonus station points are randomly determined, with a beginning high of 2,470 points.

== Ports ==
Guttang Gottong was ported to the Intellivision (published by Mattel) and the Tomy Tutor. Activision's Happy Trails, with strikingly similar gameplay, was released prior to the Intellivision port of Loco-Motion. Positive reviews of Happy Trails resulted in Mattel releasing the game at a reduced price.

An MSX port from Konami itself was published as Crazy Train.

An M Network version for the Atari 2600 was planned for release on July 5, 1983, but was canceled for unknown reasons.

The Game Boy port was released in Japan as part of Konami GB Collection Vol.2, and released in Europe as part of Vol. 3. While the Japanese version was released for the Game Boy with Super Game Boy features, the European version was colorized and translated into English for the Game Boy Color.

Hamster Corporation released the game as part of their Arcade Archives series for the Nintendo Switch and the PlayStation 4 in October 2023.
