= Atari Calculator =

1979 computer software

- Screenshot printed in Atari's 1979 "Touch the future" brochure
- Other names: Calculator
- Original author: Carol Shaw
- Developer: Atari, Inc.
- Release: 1979; 47 years ago
- Written in: Assembly
- Platform: Atari 8-bit, 6502
- Successor: Colleen Calculator
- Service name: CX-8102 (Atari); APX-20130 (APX)
- Standard: RPN
- Available in: English
- Type: Mathematical software, Financial calculator, Programmable calculator, Software calculator
- License: Proprietary

Atari Calculator (or Calculator) is a proprietary software program developed by Atari, Inc. for Atari 8-bit computers and published in 1979. It incorporates the functionality of a scientific calculator into a software calculator. It was written in assembly language by American programmer and game designer Carol Shaw. The program supports multiple modes, including enabling it to be used as a programmable calculator with a then-popular reverse Polish notation (RPN) input method.

== History ==
In 1977, the Calculator computer program was developed by Carol Shaw at Atari, Inc. In 1979, the screenshot of the Atari Calculator, with the title ATARI CALCULATOR COPYRIGHT 1979 in the main window, was printed in the "Touch the future." brochure on the screenshots gallery page, featuring the upcoming Atari 800 computer. The UI was colored in light bluish text on a dark blue background. In the same year, the "Calculator: Instruction Manual" book was printed, and program got product ID number CX-8102. On the screenshots of the program, printed in grayscale in the manual, the title in the main window changed to CALCULATOR COPYRIGHT (C) ATARI 1979.

In 1981, the Calculator was described in the "Atari Personal Computer Product Catalog" as "With this program, your ATARI Personal Computer becomes a powerful, 145-function programmable calculator".

In September 1981, the Atari Calculator was marketed in Atari Connection magazine, in the section for new business and professional applications:

More than a simple handheld calculator, the ATARI Calculator combines features found in scientific, business, and statistical calculators. [...] Package includes a manual, one program diskette, and one blank diskette. Suggested Retail Price: $29.95. Estimated Availability: November 1, 1981.

— Atari, The ATARI Calculator, Atari Connection, Fall 1981, Volume 1, Number 3

External image
- Calculator: Computer Program Diskette (box cover)

During 1981—1982, it was distributed in two variants, by Atari, Inc. itself and by the Atari Program Exchange (APX) department, in the form of boxed diskette, together with the Atari DOS 2.0, for the Atari 8-bit computers.

In June 1982, the "Calculator: Instruction Manual" book was printed by the APX, noted with "User-Written Software for Atari Computers" on the cover, and the program got product ID number APX-20130. In the same year, product CX-8102 was listed in the "Atari Home Computer Product Catalog". On the screenshot, printed in color in the catalog, the colors of the UI were changed from dark blue to reddish brown, the output line colored in black with gray text, and the input line colored in light bluish colors.

After 1982, there was little news about the Atari Calculator, its development, and it was excluded from the listing in the next official catalogs by Atari.

On 12 October 2011, Benj Edwards, a tech reporter and historian, published on the "Vintage Computing & Gaming" site the transcription of the interview with Carol Shaw, who left Atari after 1980. During the interview, there was revealed details about the Atari Calculator origin and development:

I also did a calculator for the [Atari] 800. It wasn't a game. [...] It's called Calculator. Basically, we bought a handheld programmable calculator that had financial functions and scientific functions, and so you would be able to program this thing. [...] I did this calculator thing. It did ship — I have one of them.

— Carol Shaw (2011 interview with Vintage Computing magazine)

== Features ==
Data sources: the official Atari manuals and catalogs, Carol Shaw's papers, the Atari Connection magazine, the AtariWiki

- Display size: 40×24 characters
- Required RAM size: 24 KB
- Programming support
  External image
  - Program structure for the Atari Calculator (excerpt from the papers)
- Program storage size: 100 memory registers
- Stack input size: 42 characters
- Memory data storage size: 3072 bytes
- Various calculation modes:
  - ALG (algebraic with operator precedence)
  - ALGN (algebraic without operator precedence)
  - RPN (Reverse Polish Notation)
- Various angular modes: DEG, RAD
- Various numeric modes: DEC, OCT, HEX
- Precision: Floating point, Integer
- Logical operations: AND, OR
- 145 Functions: Financial, Statistical, Trigonometric, Hyperbolic, Bit Manipulation, Factorial, Logarithm, Single- and Double-variable functions, etc.
- Polar/Rectangular conversion
- Unit conversion (temperature, mass, distance, volume, angle, etc.)
- Constants: π (pi)
- Dual-panel view for stack and memory inputs
- Tips and Error messages
- Various color themes: Brown tones (default), Black and White (positive and negative), Blue/Dark Blue/Green/Pink/Yellow tones
- Input/Output
- Save/Load
- Print out (requires Atari 825 printer to be connected)
- Exit to DOS (Atari DOS 2.0 included in diskette distribution)

== Alternatives ==
The Atari Calculator was not the only RPN calculator for Atari 800, there was also the commercial RPN Calculator (ID numbers APX-10105 and APX-20105), written in Atari BASIC by John Crane, and the Atari Rechner Simulation mit UPN by MTC (imitating hardware RPN calculator).

In the late 1980s, Atari produced a line of hardware desktop and pocket calculators, but none of them had programming support and an RPN input.

In October 2014, Norbert Kehrer created free simulators of the Hewlett-Packard RPN calculators (HP-35, HP-45, HP-55 and HP-80) for Atari 800XL and Commodore 64.

== Legacy ==
External images
- Calculator: Computer Program (ROM cartridge label by Oliver Rapp)
- Calculator launched on Atari 800 on display during the VCFe 14 (2013)
- Atari Calculator (startup screen by Peter Dell for cartridge for Carol Shaw)

In 2012, the Atari Calculator was highlighted in an article published in the ABBUC Magazin (Issue #111), which was published by the German-based, Atari Bit Byter User Club e.V., and the styled Atari Calculator title was featured on the cover. Cover design and fan art illustrations assisting the article authored by Oliver Rapp. Cover illustration also includes a sign in a lower right corner in a form of mathematical formula to say "Thank you", used by Atari community to honor notable contributors:

$$\sum_{i=0}^\infty(Thank\;you\;Carol)_i$$

Rapp also designed a label for the possible future ROM cartridge release of the Atari Calculator, reserving ID number CXL-4028.

On 27—28 April 2013, the Atari Calculator was displayed at the 14th Vintage Computer Festival Europe (VCFe) in Munich, and Vortrag Wassenberg made its presentation. Slides from this presentation were published online.

On 22 November 2013, Peter Dell released a ROM cartridge version of the modified original Atari Calculator with adding startup screen, as a personal gift sent to Carol Shaw:

My cartridge was created as a personal gift for Carol. It is explicitly based on the released disk version and includes a complete DOS, so [it] can be used reasonably even you do not have a disk drive (which was the case for her).

— Peter Dell, Calculator, https://forums.atariage.com/topic/351420-calculator/?do=findComment&comment=5257217

In 2013, Norbert Kehrer ported the original Atari Calculator to Commodore 64.

On 5 November 2014, the Atari Calculator was highlighted on the 'Inverse ATASCII Podcast'. The podcast site also published the source of the example program for the Atari Calculator, newly created cheat sheet, screenshots of software screen in various modes and an excerpt from the original user manual showing a mistake on instruction illustration.

=== Colleen Calculator ===
On 31 August 2016, Kay Savetz, the host of the 'ANTIC podcast', uploaded at the Internet Archive the scans of the Colleen Calculator source printouts, an unreleased cartridge version of the Atari Calculator — obtained from Harry Stewart — which was originally presented by Carol Shaw. In addition, two source printiouts, which included code for floating-point arithmetic handling, were scanned and uploaded the Atari Calculator cartridge specification, handwritten by Shaw, and the official printed user manual for the Atari Calculator. Savetz uploaded it all with a permission from Shaw, and the original printouts Shaw had donated to and now are storing at the Strong Museum, as well as all of the materials related to Atari, she collected during her employment period at the Atari (1978–1980).

On 29 June 2017, Shaw was hosted by Savetz on the "ANTIC" podcast. During the interview, Shaw described more details about the Atari Calculator and the Colleen Calculator development.

On 4 September 2020, Savetz released on GitHub source files of the Colleen Calculator, recovered and reconstructed from scanned printouts. The header in source files includes info on the initial commit date by Shaw:

COLLEEN CALCULATOR, BY C SHAW

                            .TITLE  'COLLEEN CALCULATOR, BY C SHAW' 
0000                ASMBL   =       0               ;1=>ASSEMBLE THIS SECTION, 0=>THIS STUFF HAS BEEN REMOVED 
                    ; 
                    ;               ATARI CALCULATOR CARTRIDGE  COPYRIGHT 1979 
                    ;               WORK STARTED 2/20/79 
                    ;               PROGRAM STARTED 3/14/79

The name of the Colleen Calculator refers to the codename of Atari 800 — the "Colleen".

== Gallery ==
UI layout from the screenshot printed in 1979:

    ATARI CALCULATOR COPYRIGHT 1979    
     RPN  RAD  DEC BITS16 FIX9 OFF     
┏━━━━━━━━━━━━━━━━━┳━━━━━━━━━━━━━━━━━━┓ 
┃      STACK      ┃REG       CONTENTS┃ 
┣━━━━━━━━━━━━━━━━━╋━━━━━━━━━━━━━━━━━━┫ 
┃X           2.907┃0           13.450┃ 
┃Y             35.┃1               0.┃ 
┃2             45.┃2            2.987┃ 
┃3          13.456┃3              35.┃ 
┃4       2368.7688┃4           3.1416┃ 
┃5          3.1416┃5              56.┃ 
┃6            120.┃6               0.┃ 
┃7       3.3714286┃7               0.┃ 
┃8           1637.┃8               0.┃ 
┃9             69.┃9               0.┃ 
┗━━━━━━━━━━━━━━━━━┻━━━━━━━━━━━━━━━━━━┛ 
 ENTER MEMORY REGISTER 0-99            
                3.                     
              .35. ***                 
             2.987 STO                 
 ENTER MEMORY REGISTER 0-99            
                2.                     
             2.987 ***                 
 >▆

UI layout from the screenshot printed in 1982:

 CALCULATOR COPYRIGHT (C) 1979 ATARI   
 ALG  RAD DEC BITS16 FIX8 CMPND ENTER  
┏━━━━━━━━━━━━━━━━┳━━━━━━━━━━━━━━━━━━━┓ 
┃      STACK     ┃       MEMORY      ┃ 
┣━━━━━━━━━━━━━━━━╋━━━━━━━━━━━━━━━━━━━┫ 
┃X              0┃0                 0┃ 
┃Y               ┃1                 0┃ 
┃2               ┃2                 0┃ 
┃3               ┃3                 0┃ 
┃4               ┃4                 0┃ 
┃5               ┃5                 0┃ 
┃6               ┃6                 0┃ 
┃7               ┃7                 0┃ 
┃8               ┃8                 0┃ 
┃9               ┃9                 0┃ 
┗━━━━━━━━━━━━━━━━┻━━━━━━━━━━━━━━━━━━━┛ 
                                       
                                       
                                       
                                       
                                       
                                       
                   0 ***               
 >▆

== See also ==
- Comparison of software calculators
- Atari BASIC
- VisiCalc

== Publications ==
- Calculator: Instruction Manual (PDF). Computer Program. Atari. 1979. (Compressed PDF, 22 MB)
- Calculator: Instruction Manual (PDF). Computer Program. Atari. 1979. (Original PDF, Gzip'ed, 114 MB)
- "The ATARI Calculator". Atari Connection. 1 (3). Atari: 6. September 1981.
- Atari's Calculator manual at the Internet Archive
- APX's Calculator manual version 2 at the Internet Archive
- Colleen Calculator - Atari 8-bit - source code at the Internet Archive
- Colleen Calculator 9K version - Atari 8-bit - source code at the Internet Archive
- Colleen Floating Point Routines at the Internet Archive
- Atari Calculator Cartridge Specification at the Internet Archive
- Wassenberg, Vortrag (2013). Atari Calculator @ VCFe 14 (PDF) (Slides). Computer Program. Munich: Atari.
- Atari Calculator: Cheat Sheet (PDF). Inverse ATASCII. 2014.
- Demidenko, G. (March 2020). "История индустрии: Carol Shaw" [The History of The Industry: Carol Shaw] (PDF). Legends of Bytes (in Ukrainian, Russian, and English). 7. Cherkasy: G Demidenko: 14–19 – via Internet Archive. "Кроме того, она сделала калькулятор для Atari 800 - программируемый, с научными и финансовыми функциями. [Also, she created a calculator for Atari 800 - programmed, with scientific and finance functions.]"
- Aycock, John; Biittner, Katie; Ganesh, Shankar; Newell, Paul Allen; Therrien, Carl (September 2022). "The Sincerest Form of Flattery: Large-Scale Analysis of Code Re-Use in Atari 2600 Games". Proceedings of the 17th International Conference on the Foundations of Digital Games. Vol. 22. Athens: ACM. pp. 1–10. doi:10.1145/3555858.3555948. ISBN 978-1-4503-9795-7. "Carol Shaw's game River Raid (1982) has a perfect match for the full routine, and the source code for her games is held by the Strong museum, meaning that the original source code for HRCALC can be seen; this is, in fact, where we take the name HRCALC from."
- Marie, Meagan (2024). "Carol Shaw". Women in Gaming: 100 Professionals of Play (PDF). Crystal Dynamics. pp. 26–27. "Outside of gaming, Shaw programmed a calculator to run on the Atari 800 computer."
- Chadwick, Ian (1985). "Appendix 9: Numerical Conversions". Mapping The Atari (The comprehensive sourcebook and memory guide) (Revised ed.) – via atariarchives.org.
