= Millipede (video game) =

1982 video game

- North American arcade flyer
- Developer: Atari, Inc. (Note: Game Boy version developed by The Code Monkeys)
- Publishers: NA: Atari, Inc.; JP: Namco
- Designer: Ed Logg
- Programmer: Ed Logg; Mark Cerny: 2600 Dave Staugas Atari 8-bit Steve Crandall
- Artists: 2600; Jerome Dourmat
- Series: Centipede
- Platforms: Arcade, Atari 2600, Atari 8-bit, Atari ST, NES, Game Boy
- Release: November 1982: Arcade; NA: November 1982; EU: April 1983; JP: 1984 2600; March 1984 Atari 8-bit; 1984 Atari ST; 1986 NES; JP: October 1, 1987; NA: October 1988 Game Boy; NA: August 1995; EU: 1995
- Genre: Fixed shooter
- Modes: Single-player, multiplayer

Millipede (stylized as millipede in western releases and as Milli-Pede in Japan) is a 1982 fixed shooter video game developed and published by Atari, Inc. for arcades. It was released by Namco in Japan. It is the sequel to 1981's Centipede, with more gameplay variety and a wider array of insect enemies. The objective is to score as many points as possible by destroying all segments of a millipede that moves toward the bottom of the screen, as well as eliminating or avoiding other enemies. As with its predecessor, the game is played with a trackball and a single fire button which can be held down for rapid-fire.

Millipede was ported to the Atari 2600 and Atari 8-bit computers, and later to the Atari ST and Nintendo Entertainment System.

== Gameplay ==
The start of a new game, with the millipede at the top left and four blue DDT bombs (arcade)

The player no longer takes the role of the "Bug Blaster" from Centipede, but instead takes the role of an elf called the "Archer". The object of the game is to destroy a millipede that advances downward from the top of the screen. The millipede travels horizontally until it either hits an obstacle or reaches the edge of the screen, after which it drops one row and reverses direction. Once it enters the player's gray maneuvering area, it stays there and extra heads appear at intervals until both they and the millipede are destroyed. Shooting a body segment splits the millipede in two, with the rear portion sprouting its own head. A collision with any enemy costs the player one life.

=== Differences from Centipede ===
- According to the game's arcade flyer and instruction manual, the game's storyline involves the player character, Archer, defending his mushroom forest from the onslaught of gigantic insect monsters using his magic arrows.
- The millipede moves faster and its head segment is more difficult to hit.
- Earwigs replace scorpions from Centipede, making mushrooms poisonous so that the millipede will charge straight to the bottom of the screen after touching them.
- Bees replace fleas from Centipede, leaving mushrooms in a vertical line and requiring two shots to destroy.
- Spiders behave the same way as in Centipede, moving in zig-zag pattern across the player area and eating mushrooms. Multiple spiders can appear at the same time on higher levels.
- Inchworms move horizontally across the screen and slow all enemies for a short period of time when hit.
- Ladybugs crawl around the player area for a while, then climb up and leave the screen, turning any mushrooms they touch into indestructible flowers. When hit, all mushrooms on the screen scroll down one row.
- Dragonflies drop mushrooms while zig-zagging down.
- Mosquitoes bounce off the sides of the screen as they descend diagonally. When hit, all mushrooms on the screen scroll up one row.
- DDT bombs are triggered when shot, destroying all enemies and mushrooms within the resulting cloud. Whenever the mushrooms scroll down, a new bomb is added at the top of the screen, with up to four bombs in play at one time. Points are scored for shooting the bomb itself, and enemies destroyed in the blast are worth three times the normal points.

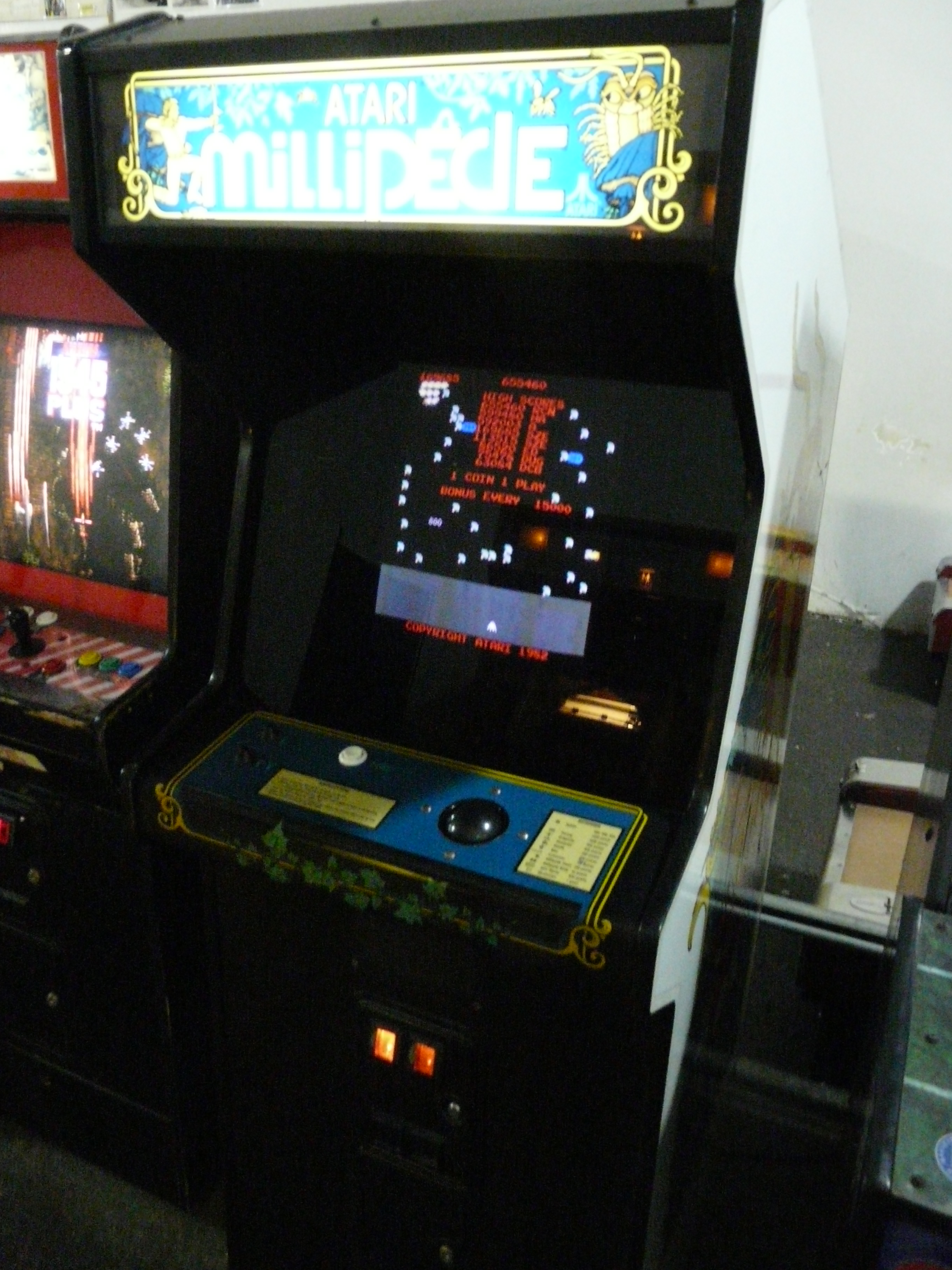
An upright cabinet

All flowers and poisoned or partially destroyed mushrooms revert to normal, whole mushrooms and score points during the process when the player loses a life.

At regular intervals, the player enters a bonus level with a swarm of enemies (bees, dragonflies, etc.) instead of the usual millipede. Each enemy awards increasing points, up to a maximum of 1,000 points per enemy. The attack ends when either the entire swarm has passed or the player loses a life. Also, at intervals new mushrooms will grow on the field while others disappear, in a pattern similar to Conway's Game of Life.

Players can choose whether to play at an advanced level, starting with a score that is a multiple of the number of points needed to earn an extra life (by default, 15,000). The gameplay is generally much more advanced than it would be had the player started with a score of 0 and worked their way up to that point level. The maximum advanced level allowed is a function of the preceding player's score, and games started at an advanced level where the player did not earn at least one extra life are not eligible for the high scoreboard.

== Ports ==
Millipede was released for the Atari 2600 and Atari 8-bit computers in 1984, then the Atari ST in 1986. A version for the Family Computer was developed and published by HAL Laboratory in 1987 as Milli-Pede: Kyodai Konchū no Gyakushū. It was renamed to Millipede: Super Arcade Hit! for its 1988 US Nintendo Entertainment System release. In the Family Computer and NES versions, earwigs do not poison the mushrooms.

A port of the Atari 8-bit version to the Atari 5200 was completed in 1984 but not published.

== Reception ==
Reception

Review score
Publication	Score
Famitsu	3/10, 5/10, 7/10, 3/10

It was listed by Cash Box magazine as America's fourth highest-grossing arcade game of 1983, below Ms. Pac-Man, Pole Position and Dragon's Lair.

French magazine Tilt rated the arcade game with four out of six stars.

Reviewing the game for the Famicom port, the Japanese magazine Biweekly Famicom Tsūshin had its four reviewers commented that the small graphics and play screen made it difficult to play and lamented that different favorite arcade titles weren't chosen or that the cart did not contain three or four extra older games.

== Legacy ==
In 1995, Millipede was released together with Centipede on the Game Boy under the title Arcade Classic No. 2: Centipede / Millipede. This version was developed by The Code Monkeys for Accolade and published by Nintendo.

In 1997, it was included in Arcade's Greatest Hits: The Atari Collection 2 for the PlayStation.

In 2005, Millipede was combined with Super Breakout and Lunar Lander for the Game Boy Advance.

The arcade and Atari 2600 versions of the game were rereleased in the 2005 Atari Anthology for the Xbox and PlayStation 2. Millipede and Centipede were made available for the Xbox 360 via Xbox Live Arcade in 2007.

== High scores ==
Donald Hayes of New Hampshire scored a world record 10,627,331 points playing Millipede on December 26, 2004. The highest Millipede score played under tournament settings is 495,126 points, also by Hayes.

In the default high-scores table of the arcade version, the initials "ED" and "FXL" refer to Ed Logg (designing and programming) and Franz Lanzinger (who helped in designing and testing), respectively.
