= Video Checkers =

1980 video game

- Box art by Steve Hendricks
- Developer: Atari, Inc.
- Publishers: Atari, Inc.
- Programmer: Carol Shaw
- Platform: Atari 2600
- Release: NA: September 1980
- Genre: Strategy
- Modes: Single-player, multiplayer

Video Checkers is a 1980 strategy video game developed and published by Atari, Inc. for the Atari 2600. It is a simulation of the strategy board game checkers where the player is tasked with eliminating or obstructing the movement of all their opponents pieces. Alongside traditional gameplay, either against a computer or human opponent, there is the giveaway checkers ruleset where the goal is to reach a losing state.

== Gameplay ==
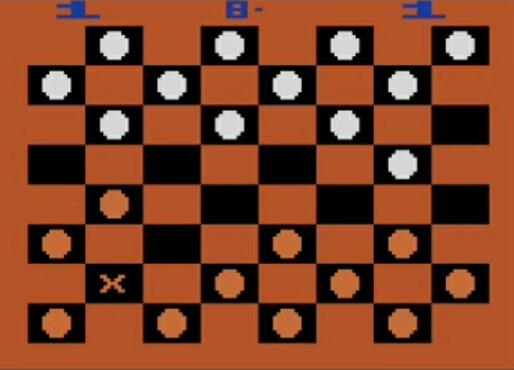
A game of standard checkers in progress against a level 8 computer opponent.

Video Checkers is a strategy video game which simulates the game of checkers. The game is played against two players on an 8x8 tile board with twelve pieces per side. A player's goal is to make the opposing side unable to make a valid move, which is accomplished by either blocking all of their opponents moves or capturing each of their pieces. In addition to the standard rules, there is also giveaway checkers which reverses the previous losing condition to be the win condition. Both variants can be played against a computer opponent of nine varying levels of difficulty, while two-person multiplayer is only possible in traditional play.

== Development ==
Video Checkers was developed by Carol Shaw at Atari. She was one of Atari's earliest female programmers, and Video Checkers and 3D Tic-Tac-Toe are two of the first commercially-released video games written by a woman. She accepted the project because Bob Whitehead was working on Video Chess at the time. Working with 4 kilobytes of ROM and the system's 128 bytes of RAM, her algorithm uses alpha–beta pruning. This is more sophisticated than the algorithm developed at the same time by Activision co-founder Alan Miller for his version of Checkers, which uses 2 kilobytes of ROM. Miller later called Shaw to offer her a job at Activision, impressed with her work on Video Checkers.

The artwork for the game was done by Steve Hendricks. The game's release was announced at Consumer Electronics Show in June 1980.

== Reception ==
Writing in The Player's Strategy Guide to Atari VCS Home Video Games in 1982, Electronic Games editors Arnie Katz and Bill Kunkel called Video Checkers "moderately challenging", remarking that the computer player "is usually capable of matching the skill level of just about any player". In a June 1983 review, the game was described as "rather limited in its interest [...] unless you are an addict of the game". In the 1984 German book, Das grosse Handbuch der Video Spiele, Harmut Huff gave the game a middling score.

In the 2011 book Classic Home Video Games, 1972-1984 A Complete Reference Guide, Brett Weiss praised the computer player, saying it did "a reasonably good job", but criticized the way the screen blanks while planning its turn. In the 2018 book The A-Z of Atari 2600 Games: Volume 2, Kieren Hawken gave a negative review, criticizing the "sluggish" controls, the slow speed at which the computer takes its turns, and the basic graphics, giving the game a score of 3/10 overall.

== Legacy ==
Video Checkers was re-released in 2003 for Windows in the collection Atari: 80 Classic Games in One! and in 2017 on the Atari Flashback series of consoles.

== See also ==
- List of Atari 2600 games
- Othello (1980 video game)
