= Gauntletak =

1984 video game

- Developer(s): Donald R. Lebeau
- Platform(s): Atari 8-bit
- Release: 1984 as Gauntlet; 1987 as Gauntletak
- Genre(s): Multidirectional shooter
- Mode(s): Single-player

Gauntletak is a multidirectional shooter video game written by Donald R. Lebeau for Atari 8-bit computers. It was published as shareware in 1984 with a full-version available for a registration of US$35. Gameplay is divided into separate screens (50 in all) with terrain and enemies. The game was originally titled Gauntlet, but was renamed in 1987 to avoid confusion with the 1985 Gauntlet arcade game from Atari Games.

== Gameplay ==
Gameplay screenshot

The player controls a saucer-shaped ship using a joystick and the keyboard, and can fire weapons in eight directions, both at the terrain (to dig holes or tunnels) and at enemies. The player uses the joystick to apply thrust in different directions, meaning the ship can be moving in one direction and firing in any other (strafing the ground or enemies). The X key on the keyboard causes the ship to full-stop.

Various kinds of enemies are found in the game, each of which reacts to the player differently. Some attack the player immediately, some wait until the player is within close proximity, some wait until the player is in their line of sight, etc. Some large enemies release smaller enemies that in turn attack the player.

Options screen with copyright message

Additionally, the player has an arsenal of different weapons to choose from: fusion bolts, homing missiles, flares, and so on that have different effects For example, fusion bolts are similar to the counter-missiles in Missile Command; they explode when they hit other objects, including explosions. The player can fire repeatedly in the same direction causing explosions to "walk back" towards their ship, providing a kind of shield against enemies.

== Name change ==
A year after the game was published, Atari Games released the hack and slash arcade game Gauntlet (itself based on another Atari computer game, Dandy). Despite having trademarked the name, after talking with his lawyers, Donald renamed the registered version of his game Gauntletak to avoid infringement. The registered version was released in 1987.
