= Dr. Muto =

2002 video game

- Developers: Midway Games West; Digital Eclipse (GBA)
- Publisher: Midway
- Designer: Ed Logg
- Platforms: PlayStation 2, Xbox, GameCube, Game Boy Advance
- Release: PlayStation 2, Xbox: NA: November 11, 2002; PAL: March 21, 2003; GameCube: NA: December 17, 2002; Game Boy Advance: PAL: March 21, 2003
- Genre: Platform
- Mode: Single-player

Dr. Muto is a 2002 platform game developed by Midway Games West. It was released for the PlayStation 2 and Xbox on November 11, 2002 and later released for the GameCube on December 17, 2002. An entirely different game with the same name was developed by Digital Eclipse and released for the Game Boy Advance on March 21, 2003. This is the last game designed by Ed Logg.

The game follows Dr. Muto, a maniacal and genius mad scientist whose latest experiment has accidentally destroyed his own home planet. In order to rebuild his world, he steals organic matter from neighboring planets. Dr. Muto uses his invention, the Splizz Gun, to mutate and morph into other organisms to complete his tasks. Overall, the game received mixed reviews by critics.

== Gameplay ==
In the game, Dr. Muto has the ability to morph into many creatures, and use a variety of gadgets to get through the game. Dr. Muto is able to turn into 5 different creatures with the use of the Splizz Gun in the game. These can be unlocked by collecting items like isotopes and animal DNA. These morphs also have special extras. There are seven different gadgets Dr. Muto can use. Players get the Splizz Gun at the start of the game, it allows Dr. Muto to extract DNA from enemies, electrocute and shoot lasers at enemies, and allows him to morph into five different creatures.

== Plot ==
Dr. Muto, a mad scientist, built a machine that would provide free, renewable energy for his home planet of Midway. However, the machine was sabotaged by Muto's rival, Professor Burnital, causing it to malfunction and destroy the planet. Dr. Muto and his laboratory survived. Now, Dr. Muto plans to build a machine called the Genitor 9000 that will rebuild Midway. However, the pieces necessary to assemble and run the machine are scattered across a number of neighboring planets and must be collected. There are 4250 isotopes and 86 bits of terra to collect in all; however, due to design issues, some of the game's isotopes are nearly impossible to collect and only 80% of the isotopes are required to complete the game.

== Reception ==
Scores

Aggregate scores
Aggregator	Score
GameRankings	PS2: 72.2% (39 reviews); GC: 70.2% (15 reviews); Xbox: 73.0% (27 reviews); GBA: 68.0% (2 reviews)
Metacritic	PS2: 67% (21 reviews); GC: 63% (6 reviews); Xbox: 70% (13 reviews)

Review scores
Publication	Score
Electronic Gaming Monthly	4/10
GameSpot	6.5 / 10
GameSpy	2/5
IGN	8.5 / 10

The game received mixed reviews, garnering a score of 70 on Metacritic. Hilary Goldstein of IGN gave the game an 8.5 out of 10, stating that Muto has "sly humor, difficult challenges, and some fantastic gameplay elements."

Electronic Gaming Monthly said the game failed to impress, particularly compared to similar games such as Ratchet & Clank and Super Mario Sunshine and that the control, in-game camera, and graphics were "a muddy mess that conspire to wring out almost all the fun."
