= G.I. Joe: The Rise of Cobra (video game) =

2009 video game

- North American cover art
- Developers: Double Helix Games (PS2/PS3/PSP/X360/Wii); Backbone Entertainment (DS); EA Mobile (Mobile)
- Publisher: Electronic Arts
- Directors: Cordy Rierson; David Msika
- Producer: Kristian Davila
- Designer: Dax Berg
- Programmer: Kyle Riccio
- Artist: David Robert Donatucci
- Composers: Cris Velasco; Sascha Dikiciyan
- Platforms: PlayStation 2, PlayStation 3, Wii, Xbox 360, mobile phone Nintendo DS, PlayStation Portable
- Release: August 4, 2009
- Genres: Action, Shoot 'em up, Third-person shooter
- Modes: Single-player, multiplayer

G.I. Joe: The Rise of Cobra is a video game adaptation of the 2009 movie of the same name. The game takes place after the movie. The Xbox 360, PlayStation 3, Wii, PlayStation 2, and PSP versions are similar, while the DS version and the mobile phone versions are different.

== Plot summary ==
After the events of Operation Hiss, Duke and Scarlett travel to the Arctic and free Heavy Duty, Ripcord, and Snake Eyes from the M.A.R.S Detention Center. Also, they fight the Baroness and bring her to the Pit. In Egypt, the Joes learn that Cobra is taking the Apep's Eye (Gem), and must defeat Firefly. In the jungle, the Joes discover that Cobra is making a pyramid-like (ziggurat) building in the middle of the jungle. From there, the Joes must defeat James McCullen (who now takes the identity of Destro) at the rooftop of the pyramid building. Finally, they must defeat the Cobra Commander at the North Magnetic Pole Volcano base.

== Gameplay ==
Duke and Snake-Eyes take aim at a Cobra Razor gunship.

Among the classes included for the various characters in The Rise of Cobra include Commando, who does well at close range, Heavy Weapons, who possesses extraordinary shooting skills, but does best from a distance, and soldier, who is a balance between the two. The classic "Yo, Joe!" battle cry is in the game, being used as an invulnerability power-up when the G.I. Joe character gains access to the Accelerator Armor, allowing them to be undamaged while attacking Cobra troops and vehicles.

The Nintendo DS version is a top-down arcade-style shooter that re-uses assets from the finished but unreleased Gauntlet DS.

== Reception ==
Reception

Review score
Publication	Score
Play	22%

The game received mixed to negative scores from several websites. It achieved a Metacritic average of 42% on the Xbox 360, and 43% on the PS3.

IGN gave the main console version a 5.8 / 10, criticizing the game's poor graphics and gameplay in general. IGN also gave the DS version a more positive 7.1 / 10.

The UK's GamesMaster was slightly more upbeat about the Xbox 360 incarnation, calling it "an enjoyable if throwaway action game that weighs in at a not so throwaway price."

IT Reviews complained that the game consisted of "repetitive bouts of blasting the same enemies, through the same terrain," and added "much of the time it feels as though you're only half playing the game."

G4TV's X-Play gave the game a 1 / 5, saying, "G.I. Joe: The Rise of Cobra is the new gold standard for lazy and uninspired cash-in licensed games. It could perhaps be argued that the developers didn't have much to work with given the source material, but that doesn't help the unfortunate consumer who ends up stuck with this Junkyard Dog of a game in his collection."
