= Ed Logg =

American video game designer

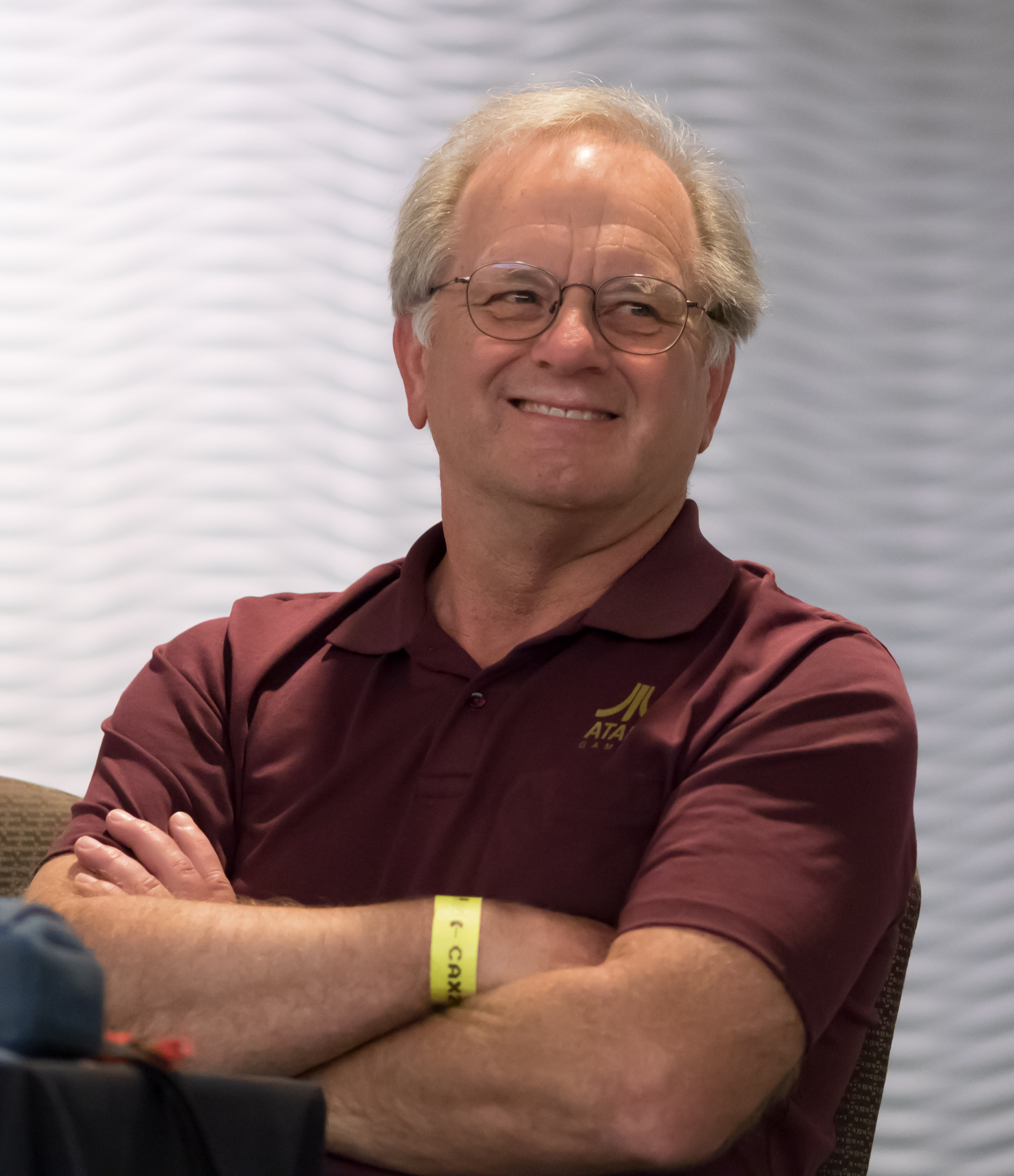
- Logg in 2015
- Born: George Edward Logg; 1948 (age 77–78); Seattle, Washington, United States
- Education: University of California, Berkeley (BS); Stanford University
- Occupation: Retired video game designer
- Known for: co-creating Asteroids, Centipede, Gauntlet

George Edward "Ed" Logg (born 1948) is a retired American arcade video game designer, first employed at Atari, Inc. and later at Atari Games. He currently resides in San Jose, California. He was educated at University of California, Berkeley, and also attended Stanford University.

== Career ==
Logg was impressed with the Atari 2600 (then known as the "Atari Video Computer System") and joined Atari's coin-op division. His first project was Dirt Bike, which was never released due to an unsuccessful field test. He co-developed Super Breakout with Ed Rotberg after hearing that Nolan Bushnell, co-founder of Atari, wanted an updated version of Breakout. He co-developed the video game Asteroids with Lyle Rains. Other games designed or co-designed by Logg include Centipede, Millipede, the Gauntlet series (with inspiration from John Palevich's Dandy), Wayne Gretzky's 3D Hockey and the home versions of the San Francisco Rush series.

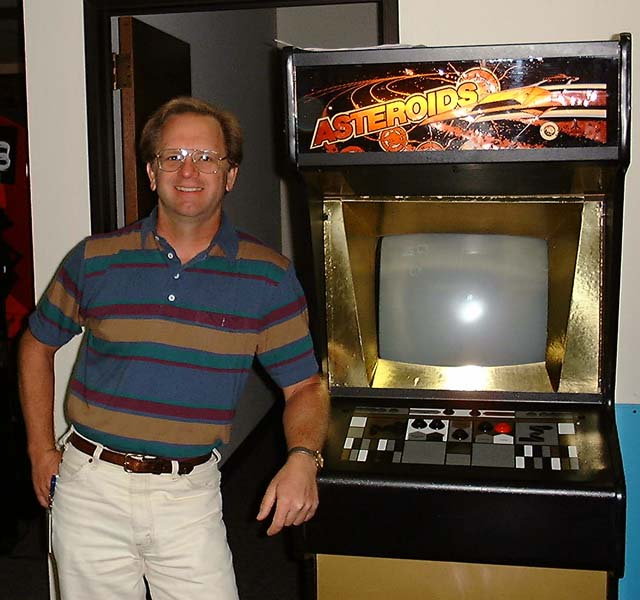
Logg in 1999, standing next to a very rare "Gold Asteroids" cabinet at Atari

== Legacy ==
In 2011, Logg was awarded a Pioneer Award by the Academy of Interactive Arts and Sciences for being among those who "laid the foundations of the multi-billion dollar videogame industry". Logg was listed at number 43 in IGN's top 100 game creators of all time.

In 2026, a documentary was released entitled "Super Duper Game Guy: Celebrating the Career of Ed Logg". This career retrospective features Logg himself, co-workers including Barry Leitch, authors such as Richard Rouse III and Steven L. Kent, as well as journalists and TV personalities including Victor Lucas.

== Ludography ==
- Super Breakout (1978)
- Asteroids (1979)
- Othello (1981)
- Centipede (1981)
- Millipede (1982)
- Gauntlet (1985)
- Gauntlet II (1986)
- Xybots (1987)
- Tetris (Atari Games) (1988)
- Steel Talons (1991)
- Space Lords (1992)
- Gauntlet IV (1993)
- Wayne Gretzky's 3D Hockey (1996)
- San Francisco Rush: Extreme Racing (1997)
- Rush 2: Extreme Racing USA (1998)
- San Francisco Rush 2049 (2000)
- Dr. Muto (2002)
