= Gauntlet (cancelled video game) =

Unreleased Nintendo DS hack and slash video game

- Developer: Backbone Entertainment
- Publisher: Eidos Interactive
- Series: Gauntlet
- Platform: Nintendo DS
- Release: Cancelled
- Genres: Hack and slash, dungeon crawl
- Modes: Single-player, multiplayer

Gauntlet is an unreleased Nintendo DS hack and slash dungeon crawl video game developed by Backbone Entertainment, based on the 1985 arcade game by the same title. The game was originally announced in April 2008, and was scheduled to be released later that year.

== Gameplay ==
The game is viewed from a top down perspective, with the DS's two screens extending the player's field of view.

Press releases and previews of the game characterized it as "retro", with gameplay based on the first two titles in the Gauntlet series, with some additions such as the character leveling system introduced in Gauntlet Legends. The four original classes from the series, Warrior, Valkyrie, Elf and Wizard, return, along with a number of "fan favourite" enemies. Also included are newly recorded versions of the series' trademark speech samples, whereby a narrator announces events occurring in-game with statements such as "Red Warrior shot the food" and "Wizard is about to die!"

The game features play spanning both screens, using an entirely new 3D graphical engine, with local wireless as well as online four-player mode, 40 maps, and voice chat capabilities. Gauntlet's multiplayer modes were said to include ranked deathmatch, team deathmatch, and capture the flag styles of play. Its Wi-Fi features were said to use a dedicated server rather than the Nintendo Wi-Fi Connection and its Friend Code system, featuring all of the same multiplayer modes available locally. Players are able to use their single-player characters in multiplayer modes, and retain experience earned in multiplayer games for solo play.

== Development ==
The possibility of a Nintendo DS Gauntlet title was first revealed by an ESRB listing in February 2008 which was later removed. The intended publisher, Eidos Interactive, officially announced the game on April 7, 2008, with a projected release in "summer 2008". This estimate was refined to a more specific June release date, which was later amended to October.

The playable demo version of Gauntlet displays this "Coming 2008!!" screen upon completion.

The game was featured in a playable state at the Penny Arcade Expo in August 2008, with both single-player and multiplayer modes available. At this time, the game was still expected to meet its October release date. Additionally, a demo of the game was made available to the public in the United States via the DS Download Station service during the summer of 2008.

By late 2008, the still-unreleased game had received several reviews in the gaming press, from magazines such as Nintendo Power, Official Nintendo Magazine, and Retro Gamer. In February 2009, however, rumors began circulating that Gauntlet had been canceled by Eidos, though no official statements were made by the involved parties.

In June 2009, Gauntlet was found on the ESRB web site under a new publisher, Majesco. In May 2013, Artwork of the game, depicting various classes, surfaced thanks to a former Backbone Entertainment artist.

Despite the game itself being unreleased, its engine was reused by Backbone for the Nintendo DS version of the film tie-in game G.I. Joe: The Rise of Cobra, (released August 4, 2009 in the United States) itself a Gauntlet-style hack and slash. North American and European 100% complete ROMs were dumped and released in December 2013.
