= Gauntlet: The Third Encounter =

1990 video game

- Developer: Epyx
- Publishers: NA/EU: Atari Corporation; JP: Mumin Corporation
- Designers: Charlie Kellner; Chuck Sommerville
- Programmer: Jon Leupp
- Artist: Paul Vernon
- Composers: Alex Rudis; Robert Vieira
- Series: Gauntlet
- Platform: Atari Lynx
- Release: NA: 1990; EU: 1990; JP: 8 April 1990
- Genres: Action role-playing, dungeon crawl, hack and slash
- Modes: Single-player, multiplayer

Gauntlet: The Third Encounter is an arcade-style dungeon crawler role-playing game developed by Epyx and published by Atari Corporation that was released for the Atari Lynx handheld system in 1990. Despite using the same packaging artwork that was used for the NES version, The Third Encounter is not a port of the original Gauntlet or its sequel, but instead is a new game developed specifically for the Lynx. It was originally titled Time Quests and Treasure Chests, but it was changed when Atari Corporation picked up the license for the Gauntlet franchise from Atari Games (which was by this stage an entirely separate company).

== Gameplay ==
Gameplay screenshot

The player controls an adventurer whose objective is to venture into an ancient castle populated by monsters in order to retrieve the Star Gem. The castle consists of 40 levels. At the start of the game, the player can choose from eight character classes to play as, including the Valkyrie and the Wizard from the original Gauntlet, as well as six new character classes: the Samurai, the Punk Rocker, the Android, the Gunfighter, the Nerd and the Pirate. Up to four players can be play and each class can only be chosen by a single player at a time. It is one of the few games for the Lynx that uses its vertical mode.

== Reception ==
Reception

Review scores
Publication	Score
Electronic Gaming Monthly	7/10, 7/10, 8/10, 6/10
IGN	5.5/10
Amstar	17/20
The Games Machine	82%
Hobby Consolas	85/100
Joystick	86%
Micromanía	7/10
Power Play	57%

Gauntlet: The Third Encounter garnered mixed reception. In a review for STart, Clayton Walnum commented: "Although The Third Encounter is basically a shoot-em-up, spells and other special items take the game a step beyond that genre. Moreover, tricky obstacles like illusory walls make this dungeon diversion as much a treasure hunt as a shooter. The display is vivid and imaginative and the gameplay fast and smooth".
