= Atari Connection =

Atari computer magazine

- Volume 3, No. 2 cover
- Categories: Computer magazine
- Frequency: Quarterly
- Publisher: Atari, Inc.
- First issue: Spring 1981
- Final issue Number: Summer 1984; Volume 4, No. 2
- Country: United States
- Language: English

Atari Connection was a magazine for owners of Atari 8-bit computers published by Atari, Inc.'s Computer Division. Editions were quarterly from the spring of 1981 to the summer of 1984 when the company was sold to Jack Tramiel. There was also a one-off "Welcome Edition" a few pages long prior to the spring 1981 edition. Including the Welcome, a total of 15 editions were produced.

The magazine contained a mixture of news, generally fawning software and book reviews, and technical articles at a mixture of skill levels. One recurring feature was the "Find the Bug" contest, which generally resulted in a winner receiving a game cartridge.

A number of well-known authors submitted articles to the magazine, including Tom Hudson.

== See also ==
- Atari Age
