= Super Breakout =

1978 video game

- Arcade flyer
- Developer: Atari, Inc. (Note: Atari ST version developed by Paradox; Game Boy and Game Boy Color versions developed by Morning Star Multimedia.)
- Publishers: Atari, Inc.: Arcade; NA/EU: Atari, Inc.; JP: Namco/Esco Game Boy, Game Boy Color Majesco
- Designers: Ed Rotberg; Ed Logg
- Programmer: Ed Rotberg: 2600 Nick Turner Carol Shaw Atari 8-bit Larry Kaplan Game Boy David Lubar
- Series: Breakout
- Platforms: Arcade, Atari 8-bit, Atari 2600, Atari 5200, Atari ST, Game Boy, Game Boy Color
- Release: September 1978: Arcade; NA: September 1978 Atari 8-bit; 1979 2600; October 1981 5200; October 1982 Atari ST; UK: 1987 Game Boy; NA: December 1998; EU: 1999 Game Boy Color; NA: 1999; EU: 1999
- Genre: Action
- Modes: Single-player, multiplayer

Super Breakout is a 1978 action video game developed and published by Atari, Inc. for arcades. It was released by Namco and Esco Trading in Japan. The game, originally designed by Ed Rotberg and Ed Logg, is a sequel to Atari's 1976 game Breakout, and uses the same mechanics while also allowing the selection of three distinct game modes, two of which involve multiple, simultaneous balls in play. As with its predecessor, the arcade version of Super Breakout is displayed in black and white, with monitor overlays to add color.

The arcade game was commercially successful in Japan and the United States. Atari published home versions of the game–in color–for most of its consoles and computers, and the game was the pack-in title for the Atari 5200 console when it was released in 1982.

== Gameplay ==
Super Breakout on Atari 2600

The fundamental gameplay—use a paddle to bounce a ball into a wall of destructible bricks—is the same as Breakout, but Super Breakout contains three different game modes. "Double" gives the player control of two paddles at the same time—one placed above the other—with two balls in play simultaneously. "Cavity" has initially only one ball, but two others are contained in pockets inside the wall and can be freed. "Progressive" advances the entire wall downward step by step, gaining in speed the longer the ball is in play.

== Development ==
The game was written by Ed Rotberg, who later designed Battlezone (1980) for Atari. Ed Logg assisted Rotberg in designing Super Breakout after hearing that Atari co-founder Nolan Bushnell wanted Breakout updated; Logg would later help design the highly successful Asteroids (1979) for Atari. While the original Breakout was constructed with discrete logic instead of a microprocessor, Super Breakout uses a MOS Technology 6502 CPU. Like its predecessor, Super Breakout uses a black and white display with overlays to simulate color.

== Ports ==
Super Breakout appeared as a cartridge for Atari 8-bit computers in 1979 with support for up to eight players taking turns. A port for the Atari VCS (later renamed the Atari 2600) was released in October 1981, initially as a Sears-exclusive release under the Tele-Games branding; an Atari-branded version was then released in January 1982. The VCS port includes two "Children's Version" games that require less skill to play. Super Breakout became the pack-in title for the Atari 5200 console when it was launched in 1982. Whereas prior home versions used paddle controllers, the 5200 port uses the system's analog joysticks.

An Atari ST version developed by Paradox was published by Atari UK in 1987. Majesco released Super Breakout for the Game Boy in 1998 and Game Boy Color in 1999. Both the Atari ST and Game Boy versions have sculpted bricks similar to those of the Breakout-inspired Arkanoid.

All of the home ports also include a version of the original Breakout game.

== Reception ==
In Japan, it was the ninth highest-earning arcade video game of 1978. In the United States, it was the eighth highest-earning arcade video game of 1979. Atari sold a total of 4,805 Super Breakout arcade cabinets.

In regard to Super Breakout being included with every Atari 5200, David H. Ahl of Creative Computing Video & Arcade Games wrote in 1983:

We thought this a somewhat curious choice since it hardly uses the higher resolution of the 5200 to great advantage. The screen, for example, has the same number of bricks as Super Breakout on the Atari VCS. However, users of the VCS will like the much better representation of alphanumerics on the 5200.

In 1995, Flux magazine ranked Super Breakout 93rd on their list of the "Top 100 Video Games".

== Legacy ==
In 1982, John Braden recorded a 7-in 33 1/3 RPM record for Kid Stuff Records, telling the story of Super Breakout. This science fiction story dealt with NASA astronaut Captain John Stewart Chang returning from a routine mission transporting titanium ore from Io to space station New California. He encounters a rainbow barrier, presumably a force of nature, that seems to have no end on either side. He has three lobbing missiles of white light that he can bounce off the hull of his shuttle, and they prove able to break through the layers of the force field. With his life support systems failing, what follows is a test of endurance turned game as he strives to break through the barrier in space.

Glu Mobile released a licensed mobile phone version. In 2008, Atari released the game for the iPhone and iPod Touch via Apple's App Store.
