= The Gauntlet (AutoVentures) =

The Gauntlet is a 1986 tabletop game supplement published by Task Force Games for Car Wars.

== Contents ==
The Gauntlet is a supplement in which an AutoVentures scenario for one player set in a near-future world dominated by vehicular combat, placing the player in a high-stakes training ground. After selecting their equipment, they must navigate a perilous gauntlet of hostile attackers.

== Publication history ==
The Gauntlet was written by Aaron Allston and published by Task Force Games in 1986 as 40-page book.
