= Carol Shaw =

American video game designer

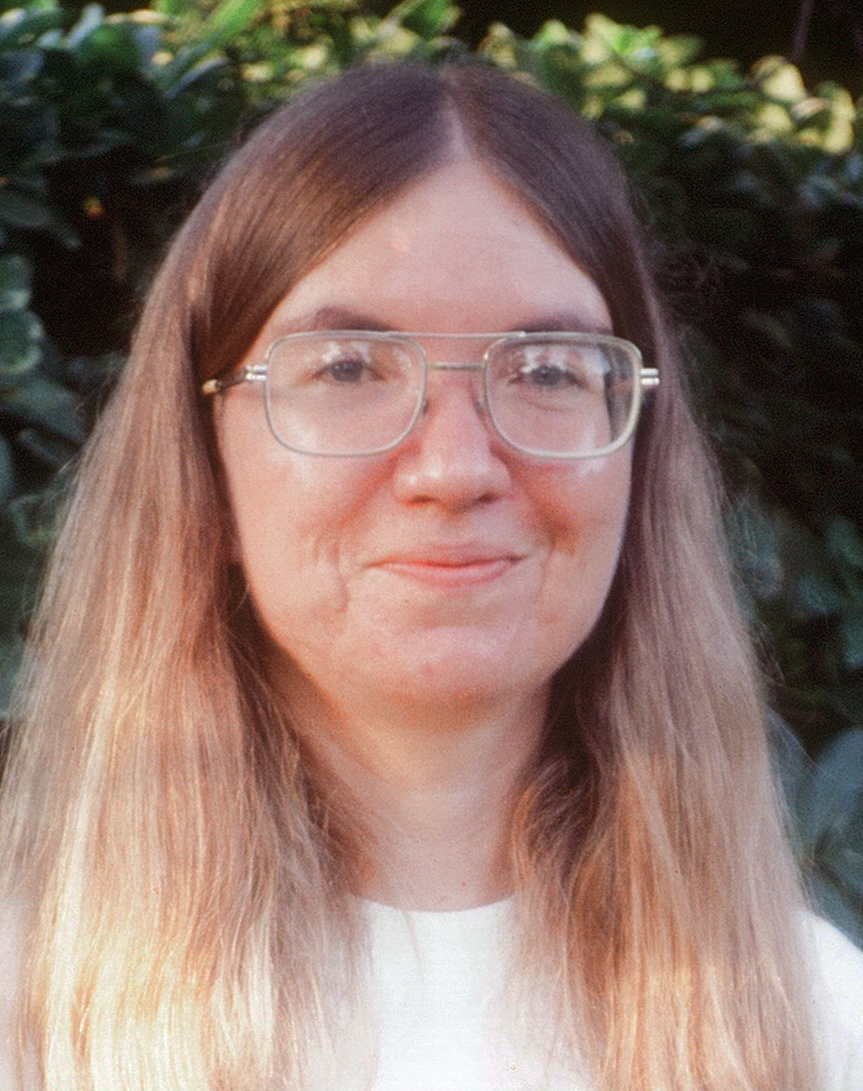
- Shaw in 1983
- Born: 1955 (age 70–71)
- Education: University of California, Berkeley (MA)
- Known for: Atari Calculator; Video Checkers; River Raid
- Spouse: Ralph Merkle (m. 1983)

Carol Shaw (born 1955) is an American video game designer. She is best known for creating the Atari 2600 vertically scrolling shooter game River Raid (1982) for Activision. She worked for Atari, Inc. from 1978 to 1980, where she designed multiple games including 3-D Tic-Tac-Toe (1978) and Video Checkers (1980), both for the Atari VCS before it was renamed to the 2600. In a male-dominated industry, she is widely believed to be the first female professional video game designer. She left game development in 1984 and retired in 1990.

== Early life and education ==
Shaw was born in 1955 and was raised in Palo Alto, California. Her father was a mechanical engineer and worked at the Stanford Linear Accelerator Center along with her mother who worked in its library. In a 2011 interview, she said she did not like playing with dolls as a child. Shaw learned about model railroading from playing with her brother's set, a hobby she continued until college. She also stated that she was gifted in mathematics throughout her childhood.

Shaw first used a computer in high school and discovered she could play text-based games on the system. Shaw attended the University of California, Berkeley and graduated with a BS in Electrical Engineering and Computer Science in 1977. She later completed a master's degree in computer science at Berkeley.

== Career ==
=== Atari, Inc. ===
Immediately after earning her master's degree in 1978, Shaw was hired at Atari, Inc. to work on games for the Atari VCS (later called the 2600) with the title of Microprocessor Software Engineer. Her first project was Polo, a promotional tie-in for the Ralph Lauren cologne. The game reached the prototype stage, but Atari chose not to publish it.

Shaw's first published game was 3-D Tic-Tac-Toe for the Atari 2600 in 1978. She also wrote Video Checkers (1980) and collaborated on two titles: a port of the coin-op game Super Breakout with Nick Turner and Othello with Ed Logg (1981). Co-worker Mike Albaugh later put her on a list of Atari's "less publicized superstars":

I would have to include Carol Shaw, who was simply the best programmer of the 6502 and probably one of the best programmers period....in particular, [she] did the [2600] kernels, the tricky bit that actually gets the picture on the screen for a number of games that she didn't fully do the games for. She was the go-to gal for that sort of stuff.

Shaw worked on several projects for the Atari 8-bit computers. With Keith Brewster, she wrote the Atari BASIC Reference Manual. She developed the programmable Calculator application, published by Atari on floppy disk in 1981.

=== Activision ===
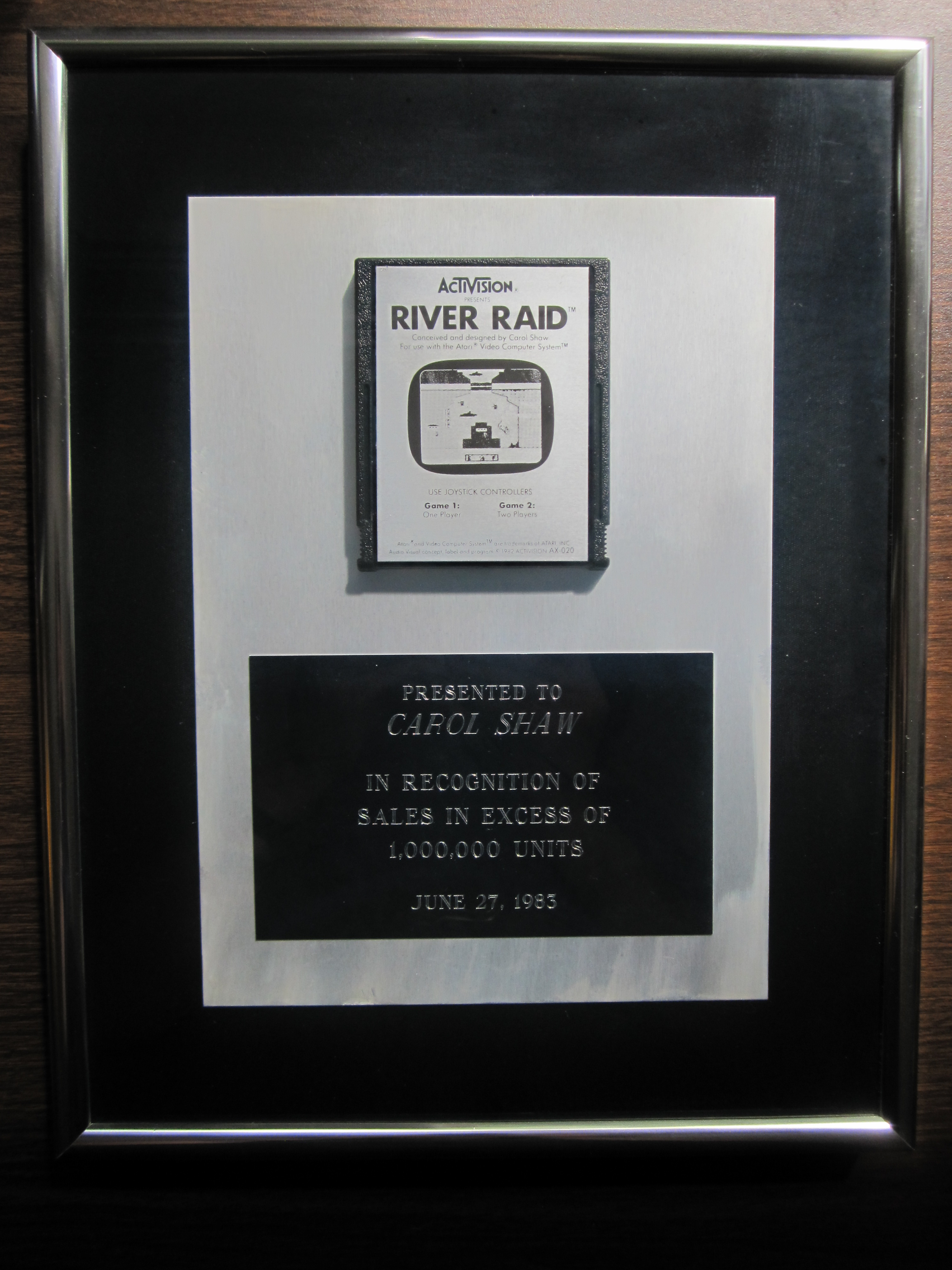
Platinum River Raid cartridge, awarded June 27, 1983, for sales of 1,000,000 units

Shaw left Atari in 1980 to work for Tandem Computers as an assembly language programmer, then joining Activision in 1982. Her first game was River Raid (1982) for the Atari 2600, which was inspired by the 1981 arcade game Scramble. The game was a major hit for Activision and personally lucrative for Shaw.

Shaw also wrote Happy Trails (1983) for the Intellivision and ported River Raid to the Atari 8-bit computers and Atari 5200. She left Activision in 1984.

=== After games ===
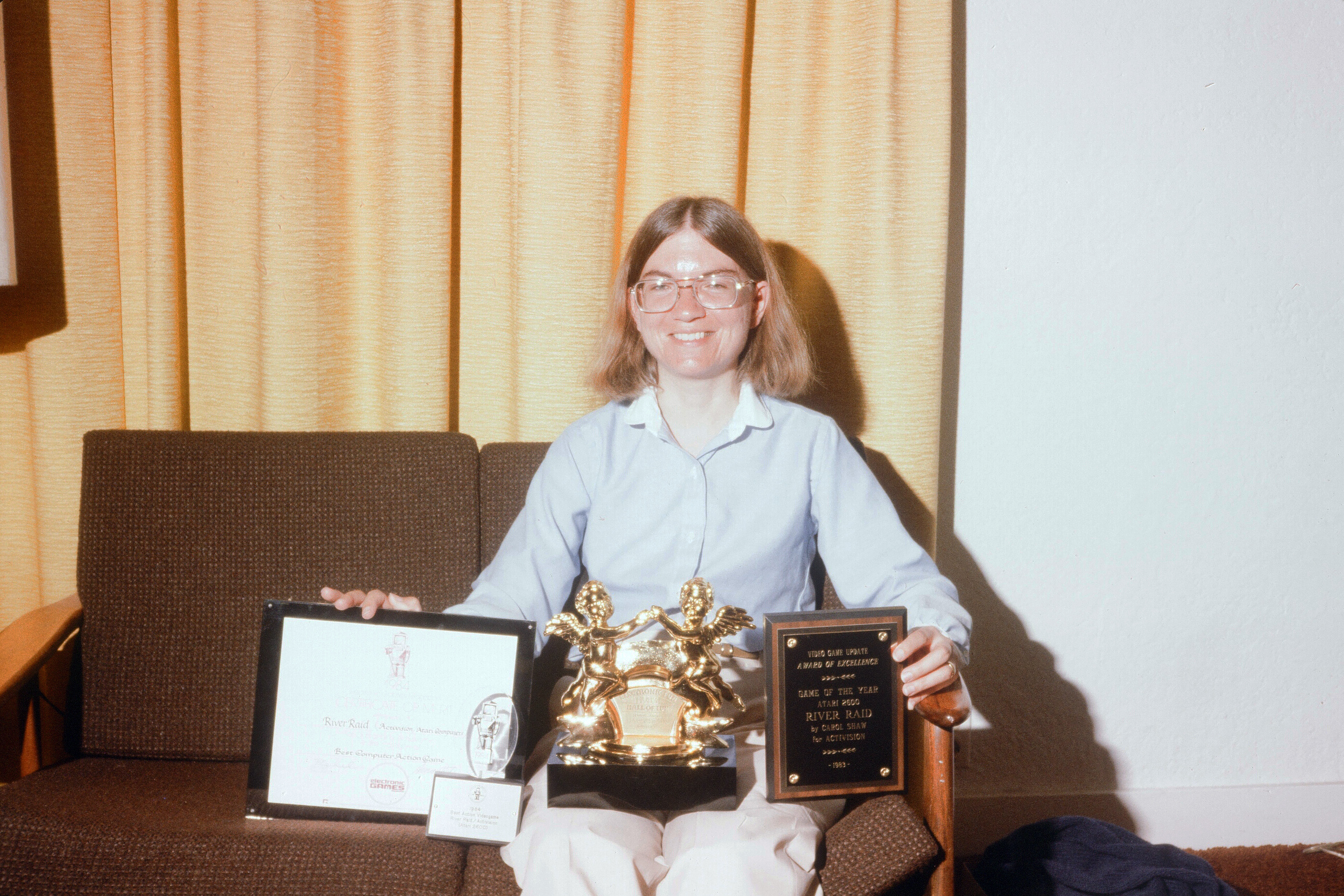
Shaw with some of her awards in 1984

In 1984, Shaw returned to Tandem. She took early retirement in 1990 and subsequently did some voluntary work including a position at the Foresight Institute. Shaw has credited the success of River Raid as being a significant factor in enabling her to retire early.

In 2017, Shaw received the Industry Icon Award at The Game Awards. In the same year, she donated her gaming memorabilia, including games, boxes, source code, and designs, to the Strong National Museum of Play.

== Personal life ==
Shaw lives in California and has been married to Ralph Merkle, a researcher in cryptography and nanotechnology, since 1983. They are signed up for cryopreservation with the Alcor Life Extension Foundation.

== Works ==
Atari 2600

- 3-D Tic-Tac-Toe (Atari, 1978)
- Othello (Atari, 1978) with Ed Logg
- Video Checkers (Atari, 1980)
- Super Breakout (Atari, 1981) with Nick Turner
- River Raid (Activision, 1982)

Intellivision

- Happy Trails (Activision, 1983)

Atari 8-bit computers

- Atari BASIC (Atari, 1979-1981) technical writing
- Atari Calculator (Atari, 1979-1981)
- River Raid (Activision, 1983) port from 2600 to Atari 8-bit and 5200

Unreleased

- Polo, Atari 2600 (Atari, 1978)

== Publications ==
- "Finding Aid to the Carol Shaw Papers, 1960-2017" (PDF), Carol Shaw Papers, Brian Sutton-Smith Library and Archives of Play, January 31, 2022 – via Strong Museum, "The Carol Shaw papers are a compilation of game design documentation, notes, sketches, source code printouts, advertisements, and other ephemera relating to the career of video game designer Carol Shaw."
- Shaw, Carol; Brewster, Keith (1979). BASIC REFERENCE MANUAL (draft). Sunnyvale, CA: Atari, Inc.
