= Gauntlet IV =

1994 video game

- Developer: M2
- Publisher: Tengen
- Designer: Masatoshi Kawasaki
- Programmer: Tetsuya Abe
- Artists: Masatoshi Kawasaki; Makoto Asao; Naoki Horii
- Writer: Gorou Sumiyoshi
- Composers: Hitoshi Sakimoto; Masaharu Iwata
- Platform: Sega Genesis
- Release: JP: September 17, 1993; NA: September 1993; EU: November 1993
- Genre: Action
- Modes: Single-player, multiplayer

Gauntlet IV (Note: Known in Japan as Gauntlet (Japanese: ガントレット, Hepburn: Gantoretto)) is a 1993 action video game developed by M2 and published by Tengen for the Sega Genesis. It includes a four player port of the original Gauntlet, as well other exclusive modes such as a new RPG Quest Mode and head to head battle mode, it was well received by critics.

== Gameplay ==
Gauntlet IV features four different modes with different game play styles:

"Arcade mode", a port of the original arcade game, has up to four players exploring a sequence of dungeons shooting at masses of enemies with projectile weapons, collecting keys to open locked doors and finding potions that wipe out all enemies onscreen. The players health decreases constantly as the game progresses and has to be replenished by collecting food items and each stage often has multiple exits which send you to different levels.

"Quest mode" is the main feature of the game, and is set in all new dungeons with new bosses to fight against and which combines the game play of the original game with new RPG elements such as character-leveling and item purchasing as well as featuring the ability to save game progress.

"Battle mode" is a deathmatch game, which has the players fighting against each other in arenas. The arenas include hidden power-ups that increase the players' attributes for that match and within this mode the projectile weapons bounce around the screen and can be used to force opponents into the exits to cause a "ring out"

"Record mode" is a single-player only variant of arcade mode in which progress is kept track via a password.

== Development and release ==
Gauntlet IV began as a port of the original Gauntlet for the X68000 as a project by a group of friends in Japan who would later form the development studio M2. It was picked up by Atari Games, the makers of the original game, and used instead as the basis for a sequel for the Genesis published by Tengen, their home-publishing imprint. The game's soundtrack was composed by Hitoshi Sakimoto and Masaharu Iwata.

== Reception ==
Reception

Review scores
Publication	Score
Mean Machines	94%
Mega	90%
MegaTech	94%

Upon the game's release in 1993, MegaTech said that "the action is flawless" and had stood the test of time well. They continued that it was "a brilliant game, and one that warrants immediate attention". Mega praised the longevity of the game, saying it was "huge fun and a must-buy" and placing the game at No. 19 in their list of the best Mega Drive games of all time.
