= Gauntlet (1985 video game) =

1985 video game

- North American arcade flyer
- Developer: Atari Games
- Publishers: Atari Games: Arcade; NA/EU: Atari Games; JP: Namco; Ports; Tengen; U.S. Gold
- Designer: Ed Logg
- Programmers: Ed Logg, Bob Flanagan
- Artists: Sam Comstock; Susan G. McBride; Alan J. Murphy; Will Noble
- Composers: List: Arcade, NES; Brad Fuller; Hal Canon; Earl Vickers; CPC, ZX Spectrum; Ben Daglish
- Series: Gauntlet
- Platform: Arcade: ZX Spectrum, Commodore 64, Amstrad CPC, MSX, Atari ST, Atari 8-bit, Apple IIGS, Apple II, NES, MS-DOS, Macintosh, Master System
- Release: October 15, 1985: Arcade; UK: October 15, 1985; NA: November 1985; JP: February 1986; ZX Spectrum; UK: 1986; C64; EU: 1986; NA: September 1987; CPC, MSX; EU: 1986; Atari ST; October 1987; Atari 8-bit; December 1987; Apple IIGS; March 1988; Apple II; April 1988; NES; NA: July 1988; MS-DOS; 1988; Macintosh; May 1989; Master System; EU: November 1990
- Genres: Maze, dungeon crawl
- Modes: Single-player, multiplayer
- Arcade system: Atari Gauntlet

Gauntlet is a 1985 dungeon crawl maze video game developed and published by Atari Games for arcades. It is one of the first multiplayer dungeon crawl arcade games. The core design of Gauntlet comes from the 1983 game Dandy for the Atari 8-bit computers, which resulted in a threat of legal action. It also has similarities to the 1983 maze game Time Bandit.

The arcade version of Gauntlet was released in October 1985, initially available only as a dedicated four-player cabinet. Atari distributed a total of 7,848 arcade units. In Japan, the game was released by Namco in February 1986. Atari later released a two-player cabinet variant in June 1986, aimed at operators who could not afford or did not have sufficient space for the four-player version.

== Gameplay ==
Arcade version screenshot

The game is set within a series of top-down, third-person, orthographic mazes where the object is to kill monsters, gather treasures, and find the exit in every level. An assortment of special items can be located in each level. These items can increase the player's health, unlock doors, award more points and destroy all of the enemies on screen.

Each player controls one of four fantasy-based characters: Thor, a warrior; Merlin, a wizard; Thyra, a valkyrie; or Questor, an Elf. The characters are named on the cabinet artwork, but in-game they are referred only by the title of their classes. Each character has his or her own unique strengths and weaknesses. For example, the warrior is strongest in hand-to-hand combat, the wizard has the most powerful magic, the valkyrie has the best armor, and the Elf is the fastest in movement. The characters are assigned by control panel in the four-player version, whereas in the two-player version each player selects their own character at the start of the game or while joining during the middle of play.

The enemies are an assortment of fantasy-based monsters, including ghosts, grunts, demons, lobbers, sorcerers, and thieves. Each enters the level through specific generators, which can be destroyed. The most dangerous enemy is Death, who can only be destroyed by using a magic potion—otherwise Death will vanish automatically after it has drained a certain amount of health from the player.

As the game progresses, higher levels of skill are needed to reach the exit, with success often depending on the willingness of the players to cooperate by sharing food and luring monsters into places where they can be engaged and slaughtered more conveniently. While contact with enemies reduces the player's health, health also slowly drains on its own, thus creating a time limit. When a character's health reaches zero, that character dies. The character can be revived in place with full health by spending a game credit—inserting a coin in the arcade—within a certain short time window after it died. This allows even the least proficient players to keep playing indefinitely, if they are willing to keep inserting coins. However, each player's final score will be divided by the amount of credits they used to play.

Aside from the ability to have up to four players at once, the game is also noted for the narrator's voice, which is produced by a TMS5220C speech chip. The TMS5220C speech was encoded by Earl Vickers. The narrator (voiced by Ernie Fosselius) frequently makes statements repeating the game's rules, including: "Shots do not hurt other players, yet", "Remember, don't shoot food", "Elf shot the food", and "Warrior needs food, badly". The narrator occasionally comments on the battle by saying, "I've not seen such bravery" or "Let's see you get out of here". When a player's life force points fall below 200, the narrator states, "Your life force is running out", "Elf needs food", or "Valkyrie is about to die".

The control panel for the four-player cabinet is wider than other standard uprights in order to accommodate four people at the same time. Each player has an eight-way joystick and two buttons: one for "fire" (ranged attack) and one for "magic". The "magic" button also starts the game. After Gauntlet's release, other games started using this design, so it was a popular conversion target for newer games after it had its run.

== Development ==
Originally called Dungeons, the game was conceived by Atari game designer Ed Logg. He claimed inspiration from his son's interest in the paper-based game Dungeons & Dragons and from his own interest in the 1983 four-player dungeon crawl for the Atari 8-bit computers, Dandy.

The game's development spanned from 1983 to 1985, with a team being led by designers Ed Logg and Roger Zeigler. The working title became legally unavailable in April 1985, so it was renamed Gauntlet in May. Based upon some of the most elaborate hardware design in Atari's history to date, it is the company's first coin-operated game that features a voice synthesizer chip.

Another game that Gauntlet bears a striking resemblance to is Time Bandit (1983), especially its Atari ST version released in 1985, which led to claims of one possibly being a "clone" of the other. However, Time Bandit designer Harry Lafnear stated that his game was based on Konami's earlier arcade game Tutankham (1982), and that he only found out about Gauntlet after the Atari ST version was completed in late 1985. He believes neither game copied each other, but that their similarities stem from being inspired by earlier "maze shoot 'em up" titles such as Tutankham. In 2008, Retro Gamer magazine called Tutankham "an early Gauntlet".

=== Dandy dispute ===
Ed Logg, the co-creator of Asteroids and Centipede, is credited with the original game design of Gauntlet in the arcade version, as well as the 1987 NES release. After its release, John Palevich threatened a lawsuit, asserting that the original concept for the game was from Dandy, a game for the Atari 8-bit home computers written by Palevich and published in 1983. The conflict was settled without any suit being filed, with Atari Games doing business as Tengen allegedly awarding Palevich a Gauntlet game machine. (Logg did not program the NES version.) Dandy was later reworked by Atari Corporation and published for the Atari 2600, Atari 7800, and Atari 8-bit computers as Dark Chambers in 1988.

== Ports ==
Gauntlet was ported to MS-DOS, Apple II, Mac, MSX, Nintendo Entertainment System, Apple IIGS, Master System, Atari ST, Commodore 64, Atari 8-bit computers, Amstrad CPC, and ZX Spectrum. An X68000 version was under development by M2, before being showcased to Tengen, Atari Games' consumer software publishing division, and released as Gauntlet IV for the Sega Genesis.

The NES version was developed and released by Tengen in 1988. It was the very first title to be developed in the United States for the NES, as well as one of only three games released by Tengen for the system that was licensed by Nintendo. In 1998, the game was re-released for PlayStation and Windows as part of the compilation Arcade's Greatest Hits: The Atari Collection 2.

=== Expansion pack ===
Gauntlet: The Deeper Dungeons is an expansion pack for the original computer ports of Gauntlet with 512 new levels. It was developed by Gremlin Graphics and released in 1987 by U.S. Gold in the UK and Europe and Mindscape in the US for the Amstrad CPC, MSX, Atari ST, Commodore 64, and ZX Spectrum ports of Gauntlet.

Many of its levels were entries in a competition throughout Europe in which ten winners were awarded prizes, a Gauntlet T-shirt and a copy of the program for their computers. The contest was announced in the instructions of many of the ported games. The levels are presented randomly and its artwork is the side panel artwork of the arcade cabinet with only the main characters shown. The enemies were removed from the image and replaced with a pink background.

Reviewers noted that the levels were much harder than those in the original game, although the consensus was that it was not quite as good as the first game or the newly released arcade sequel.

== Reception ==
Reception (ports)

Review scores
Publication	Score
ACE	859/1000
Amstrad Action	93% (CPC)
Crash	92%
Computer and Video Games	CPC 464: 36/40; SMS: 92%, 90%
Dragon	4/5
Joystick	79%
Sinclair User	5/5
The Games Machine (UK)	72%
Your Sinclair	9/10
Zzap!64	93%
Commodore User	9/10
Computer Gamer	94%
Console XS	80%
Your Computer	5/5

Awards
Publication	Award
Crash	Crash Smash
Your Sinclair	Megagame
Amstrad Action	Mastergame

=== Commercial ===
The game was highly profitable upon its November 1985 launch in North America, reportedly earning one San Mateo, California arcade operator $15,000 in sixteen weeks and another Canadian operator US$4,500 in nine days. In the United States, it topped the monthly RePlay upright arcade cabinet chart in December 1985, and topped the Play Meter arcade video game charts from January 1986 to March 1986; after being displaced by Sega's Hang-On in April, Gauntlet returned to the top spot in May. RePlay listed it as the second highest-grossing arcade video game of 1986 in the United States, below Hang-On, while AMOA listed it as the year's highest-earning dedicated arcade cabinet. Atari ultimately sold a total of 7,848 Gauntlet video game arcade cabinets.

In Japan, Gauntlet was a commercial success for Namco. At a Japanese trade show in late 1985, the game drew large crowds and set record earnings for an Atari arcade cabinet. Game Machine listed Gauntlet as the second most popular upright/cockpit arcade game of March 1986, below Sega's Space Harrier, before Gauntlet topped the chart in April. It went on to be Japan's third highest-grossing upright/cockpit arcade game during the first half of 1986 (below Hang-On and Space Harrier), and the sixth highest during the second half of the year. It was Japan's fourth highest-grossing upright/cockpit arcade game of 1986, below Hang-On, Space Harrier and Pole Position II.

In the United Kingdom, the home computer conversions topped the UK sales chart in December 1986. It went on to sell more than 200,000 copies in the UK by 1987, and over 300,000 copies as of 1988.

=== Critical ===
The arcade game received a positive review from Clare Edgeley of Computer and Video Games upon release. Yung Min Choi reviewed the home computer conversion of Gauntlet with Demon Stalkers for Computer Gaming World, and stated that "in reality, players who crave this type of action will not be disappointed with either game". Entertainment Weekly picked the game as the 14th-greatest game available in 1991, saying: "There have been sequels to this game, but nothing matches the original Gauntlet, an innovative, fast-playing mix of mazes, monsters, and magic spells".

The Mac version was reviewed in 1989 in Dragon No. 150 by Hartley, Patricia, and Kirk Lesser in "The Role of Computers" column. The reviewers gave the game four out of five stars. Compute! praised the Macintosh version's sound effects. Computer and Video Games praised the accuracy of the Amstrad version, and said that it had "great graphics, good sounds, and perfect playability". Crash praised the smooth and fast scrolling, and the longevity, with Avenger being listed as the only alternative. In their Master System review, ACE said that people of all ages could quickly master the controls and tasks. The Spectrum version was the biggest-selling game of 1986, and was voted number 38 in the Your Sinclair Readers' Top 100 Games of All Time.

More than a decade after release, the Official UK PlayStation Magazine noted that they "spent many a night hunched over a fag-stained Gauntlet machine", but said that the limitations had become apparent in the late 1990s. Next Generation, while not including the game in their "Top 100 Games of All Time", noted in the intro that "for the record, Gauntlet was number 101". In 1995, Flux magazine rated the game 89th on their "Top 100 Video Games." In 1996, GamesMaster ranked Gauntlet 18th in its "Top 100 Games of All Time."

=== Awards ===
At the 1986 Golden Joystick Awards in London, Gauntlet won Game of the Year, and was runner-up in the category of Arcade Game of the Year. It also received a Smash Hit award from ZX Computing magazine. It also won "Best Audio Enhancement in a Video Game" and "Most Innovative Video Game" at the 1986 Amusement Players Association's Players Choice Awards; the overall Game of the Year award went to the arcade version of Super Mario Bros.

== Legacy ==
Release timeline
1985	Gauntlet
1986	Gauntlet II
1987
1988
1989
1990	Gauntlet: The Third Encounter
1991	Gauntlet III: The Final Quest
1992
1993	Gauntlet IV
1994
1995
1996
1997
1998	Gauntlet Legends
1999	Gauntlet Dark Legacy
2000
2001
2002
2003
2004
2005	Gauntlet: Seven Sorrows
2006
2007
2008
2009
2010
2011
2012
2013
2014	Gauntlet

The arcade original was followed by a 1986 sequel, Gauntlet II, which was followed by further sequels on home platforms, including Gauntlet: The Third Encounter, Gauntlet III: The Final Quest, and Gauntlet IV. The arcade series was revived with Gauntlet Legends in 1998, which itself saw the sequels Gauntlet Dark Legacy and Gauntlet: Seven Sorrows. The original Gauntlet arcade game is included in Midway Arcade Treasures (2003) for the GameCube, PlayStation 2, Xbox, and Microsoft Windows, and Midway Arcade Origins (2012) for the Xbox 360 and PlayStation 3.

The game was rebooted in 2014 on home platforms as Gauntlet.
