= River Raid =

1982 video game

- Atari 2600 cover art featuring the B1 StratoWing Assault Jet in combat
- Developer: Activision
- Publisher: Activision
- Designer: Carol Shaw
- Series: River Raid
- Platforms: Atari 2600: Atari 8-bit; ColecoVision; Atari 5200; Commodore 64; IBM PCjr; Intellivision; MSX; ZX Spectrum
- Release: December 1982: Atari 2600; December 1982; Atari 800; September 1983; Atari 5200, ColecoVision, Intellivision; December 1983
- Genre: Shoot 'em up
- Modes: Single-player, multiplayer

River Raid is a 1982 shoot 'em up video game developed and published by Activision for the Atari 2600 and designed by Carol Shaw. The player controls a fighter jet over the River of No Return in a raid behind enemy lines. The goal is to navigate the flight by destroying enemy tankers, helicopters, fuel depots and bridges without running out of fuel or crashing.

Before joining Activision, Shaw had developed games for Atari, Inc. Inspired by the arcade game Scramble (1981), she set out to make a game with a continuously scrolling screen. Shaw programmed and designed River Raid herself, taking occasional advice from other Activision staff.

River Raid was one of the best-selling games of 1983 and the second best-selling Atari 2600 video game of the year after Ms. Pac-Man. It received year-end awards from The Video Game Update and the Arkie Awards. The game was ported to several other consoles and computers and received a sequel in 1988. It has continued to receive praise as one of the best games for the Atari 2600 from various publications.

== Gameplay ==
Atari 2600 gameplay. The player controls the plane at the bottom of the screen across a river canyon.

In River Raid, the player is in a B1 StratoWing Assault Jet that is retrofitted with rapid-fire guided missiles and has the ability to both accelerate and slow down easily. The jet is going down the "River of No Return" where it is on a mission to break the enemy blockades and halt troop advances. Similar to endless runner games, the river has no ending and scrolls infinitely.

River Raid is played with the joystick. The player can move left and right on the screen and forward and backwards to accelerate and slow down respectively. The player can shoot missiles with the joystick's button to destroy enemy tankers, helicopters, fuel depots and bridges. The goal in River Raid is to collect as many points as possible before crashing or running out of fuel. Fuel can be collected by flying over a fuel depot to fill up the gauge that is displayed at the bottom of the screen. As the river progresses, there will be fewer fuel tanks. The player loses one of their jets if they collide with the river bank or enemy objects. If the player has remaining jets, they will respawn at the same section of the river they crashed. If a bridge is destroyed at the end of a section, the player will restart at that bridge upon losing a life.

In the Atari 2600 version, Switch A has missiles that shoot straight, while Switch B has guided missiles instead.

The port to Atari 8-bit computers adds the ability to select which bridge to start at, bonus points if the player shoots a bridge with tanks on it, and more hazards such as helicopters that fire back.

== Development ==
River Raid was designed by Carol Shaw for Activision. She said the idea of the game was mostly her own, with some feedback from other designers. Shaw recalled that there were numerous video games with scrolling and thought it would be wise to develop the game for the Atari 2600. She was initially inspired by the game Scramble (1981) and approached Alan Miller of Activision to develop a space-themed game. Miller responded that there were too many outer space–themed games, suggesting her to come up with a different theme.

Shaw created a game where objects scroll down the screen. She began drawing the game on graph paper and found that creating a game which scrolled horizontally would not work well and would appear "very jerky", leading it to be designed to scroll vertically. While doodling on graph paper, she found that she could design the game with a mirror image looking like a river with islands in the middle of it. Initially, the players would be controlling a boat which Shaw felt did not look good. She recalled Activision programmer David Crane's suggestion that a jet would look better, and she began designing one which appeared to be flying up a canyon.

Some input came from either David Crane or Steve Cartwright to add fuel tanks that the player could fly over for fuel or shoot and destroy for points. Other gameplay elements followed after, such as how far apart bridges were. While developing the sound effects, she asked other Activision developers about appropriate Klaxon-styled sounds to warn the player when their fuel was running low. According to Crane, he thought for a moment and recited some lines of assembly code that created the effect.

Shaw coded the version for the Atari 800, which was eight kilobytes in size compared with the Atari 2600 version's four kilobytes. The home computer version, which she described as a "whole new game", required substantial new development. Most of the code for River Raid had to be re-written for the Atari computer version. Shaw said that she had "pretty much mastered playing the game" and thought it would be more fun to be able to start at a higher level. This led to her adding the ability to restart the game from a bridge further down the river. Shaw also designed more detailed graphics such as the canyon's river and walls.

== Release ==
River Raid was published by Activision and released for the Atari 2600 on December 1982. It was released for the Atari 800 line of computers in September 1983 and both the Atari 5200 and Intellivision in December 1983. The game was also ported to other home computers such as the Commodore 64, ZX Spectrum, MSX and IBM PCjr.

In West Germany, the Law for the Protection of Youth was updated in 1985 to ban arcade games from public spaces open to young people. The Bundesprüfstelle für jugendgefährdende Schriften (Federal Department for Works Harmful to Young Persons, now the Federal Department for Media Harmful to Young Persons) consequently began monitoring video games, and River Raid was banned for its military-themed content.

River Raid has been re-released on several video game compilation packages. These include the Atari 2600 Action Pack (1995) for home computers, Activision Classics (1998) for PlayStation, Activision Anthology (2002) for PlayStation 2 and portable systems such as Game Boy Advance and PlayStation Portable. Atari teased a large announcement on August 20, 2026 which was revealed a re-release of several Activision games for the Atari 2600. This included River Raid set for a November 2026 release.

== Reception ==
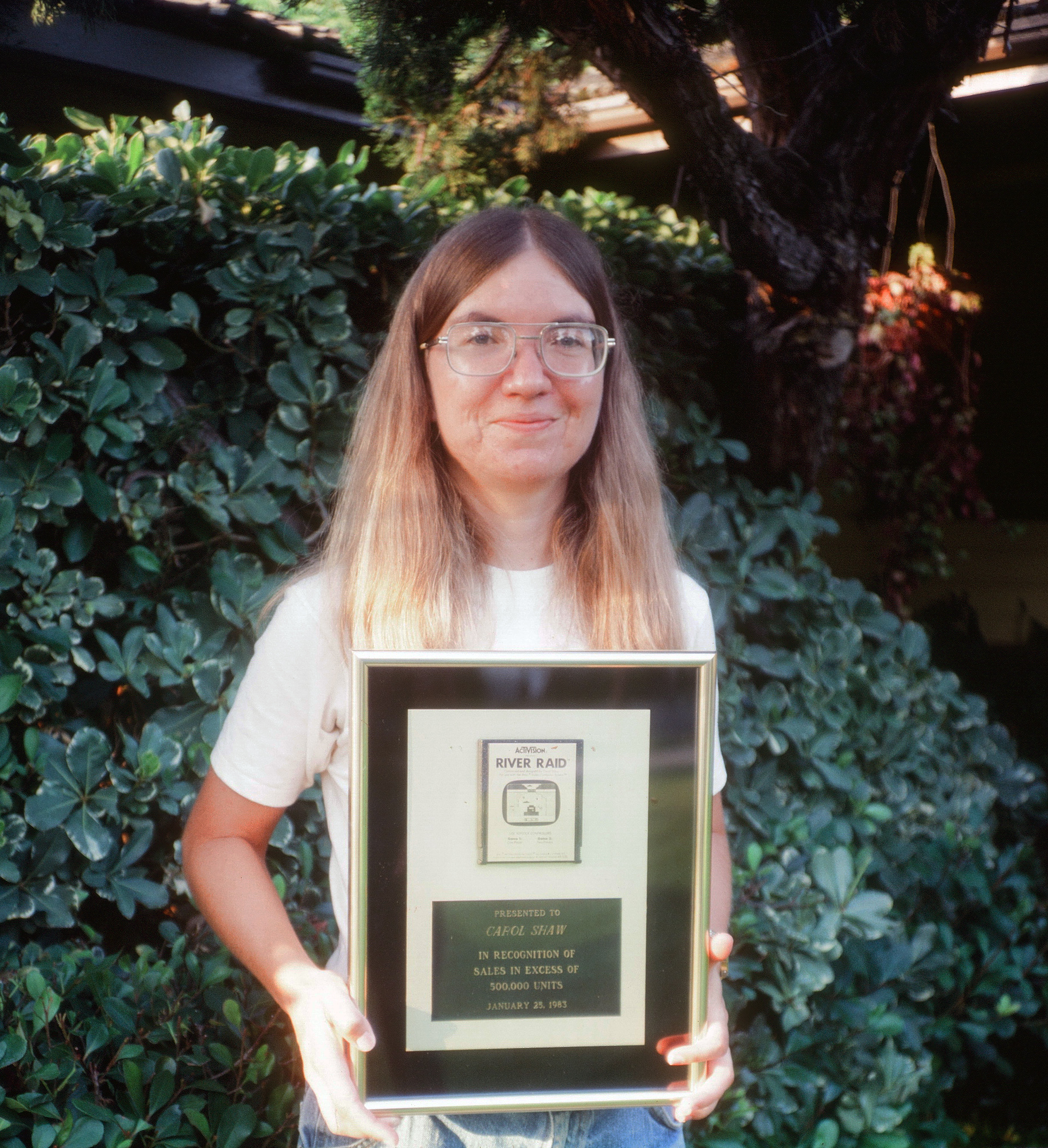
Carol Shaw in 1983 with her award plaque for selling over 500,000 copies of River Raid

River Raid was the top-selling Activision game of 1983 and the second best-selling game for the Atari 2600 in 1983, only being beaten by Ms. Pac-Man. Shaw responded to the sales stating "I knew it was a good game, but I didn't expect to hit number one. Of course I was happy when it did!" The Atari version had sold nearly one million copies by January 1984.

Early reviews from video game publications mostly found the game fun with varying takes on the quality of graphics and how it compared to similar games for home consoles. E.C. Meade of Videogaming Illustrated lauded the game for its exciting themes, fast-paced gameplay and high quality graphics, finding it superior to the ColecoVision game Zaxxon. Jim Clarke of the same publication declared it a "top-notch" game, but found it "surprisingly flat" after playing B-17 Bomber (1982) on Intellivision. Clarke said he desired more complexity as "blasting away at things [...] becomes redundant. There is no sense of pacing: it's one shot, one course correction, one potential collision after another." Michael Blanchet of Electronic Fun with Computers & Games said the game was similar to others on the market, but stood out for its ever-changing scenery and constant shift in strategy. A reviewer in The Video Game Update stated it was a "very easy game to learn, but a difficult one to master completely" saying the "graphics are good, but not dazzling". Phil Wiswell of Video Games echoed similar statements, writing that the game was "fun to play" and was "demanding of your concentration" while its graphics were not as appealing as other Activision titles.

For the various ports, The Video Game Update praised the Intellivision version, noting its "beautiful, brightly colored graphics and exciting game play", feeling that it plays most like the Atari 2600 game, with superior graphics. Scott Mace of InfoWorld found the Atari home computer version more challenging than the Atari 2600 version and that it outshone other similar games such as Caverns of Mars (1981). Mace found the biggest flaw was the lack of a dial-like device to turn the controller, as the Atari joystick made for "a lousy steering device". Antic in 1984 said that the Atari 8-bit version was identical to the 2600 original, but with slightly "spiffed up ... game visuals". Craig Holyoak of the Deseret News praised River Raid on the ColecoVision as "one of the most playable and entertaining of all war games".

The Commodore 64 (C64) version had reviews in computer magazines Your 64 and Commodore Horizons finding the graphics average, with the latter publication saying that the game was enjoyable despite the lack of quality graphics rather than because of them. While Home Computing Weekly's review found the game tedious after extended play sessions, the Your 64 review found it better than the console game.

River Raid received the award for "1984 Best Action Videogame" and a Certificate of Merit in the category of "1984 Best Computer Action Game" at the 5th annual Arkie Awards. The judges Bill Kunkel and Arnie Katz described it as "provid[ing] the brand of non-stop excitement the blast brigaders adore". The Video Game Update awarded River Raid as the Game of the Year for the Atari 2600 in their Awards of Excellence 1983.

=== Retrospective reviews ===
Retrospective ratings

Review scores
Publication	Score		
Publication	Atari 2600	C64	ColecoVision
AllGame	4.5/5		3.5/5
Commodore Force		50%	
Game Informer	9/10		
The Video Games Guide	3/5		
Zzap!64		70%	

From retrospective reviews of the Atari 2600 version, Brett Weiss included the game in his book The 100 Greatest Console Video Games, 1977–1987 (2014), noting its sharp non-flickering graphics and smooth difficulty progression with "intense, challenging gameplay". Weiss said that some reviewers have found the game has not aged well with the release of such games as Ikaruga (2003), but he felt River Raid still remained fun, charming, and elegant. Matt Fox in his book The Video Games Guide (2013) echoed that the graphics and sound were impressive for the Atari 2600. He was indifferent on the gameplay, writing that with only moving and static hazards to avoid, nothing actively attacked the player's jet.

Both Game Informer and IGN described the game as a highlight of the shooter or shoot 'em up game genre. Levi Buchanan of IGN placed the game at number two on their list of 2600 titles and praised its pacing, stating that "the game never grew boring in 1982. And it retains its fresh, frantic feeling in 2008." An anonymous reviewer in Game Informer commended it as "one of the best shooters ever to grace the [Atari 2600]", highlighting the scrolling as most games for the system at the time were confined to a single screen.

Both Weiss and Buchanan stated that it was one of the best games for the Atari 2600. In their list of the top 25 Atari 2600 games, Stuart Hunt and Darran Jones from Retro Gamer magazine ranked River Raid third, stating it was the best of the shooter games on the 2600, noting "smooth scrolling and surprisingly detailed scenery". Other publications have included River Raid in their best video games of all time lists, such as Flux (1995) and Next Generation (1996), that highlighted the game's "seemingly infinite scenery" and its level design respectively. Mat Allen of Retro Gamer placed River Raid, along with Kaboom! (1981), Pitfall II: Lost Caverns (1984), Ghostbusters (1984), Little Computer People (1985) and Alter Ego (1986), among the best games from Activision's classic era.

For ports, the reviewers in Zzap!64 commented on the C64 version as having simple graphics and being "a little repetitive" by 1987 standards, though it was still deemed better than contemporary offerings like Xevious, Aftermath and Terra Cognita. Chris Hayward of Commodore Force covered the game in 1993 in an overview of shoot 'em ups for the computer. He described the game as having awful graphics and sound, summarizing it as a "trip down memory lane for the infirm". Weiss found the Atari 5200's controls "a little loosey goosey" and the ColecoVision faster-paced than other versions, but with a slight delay in controls, declaring both games "great nevertheless". He wrote that the Intellivision port had poor controls and was the worst of the four console ports. Writing for AllGame, he found that what was "revolutionary" about River Raid—the sound and graphics for the Atari 2600—appeared dated on the ColecoVision.

== Legacy ==
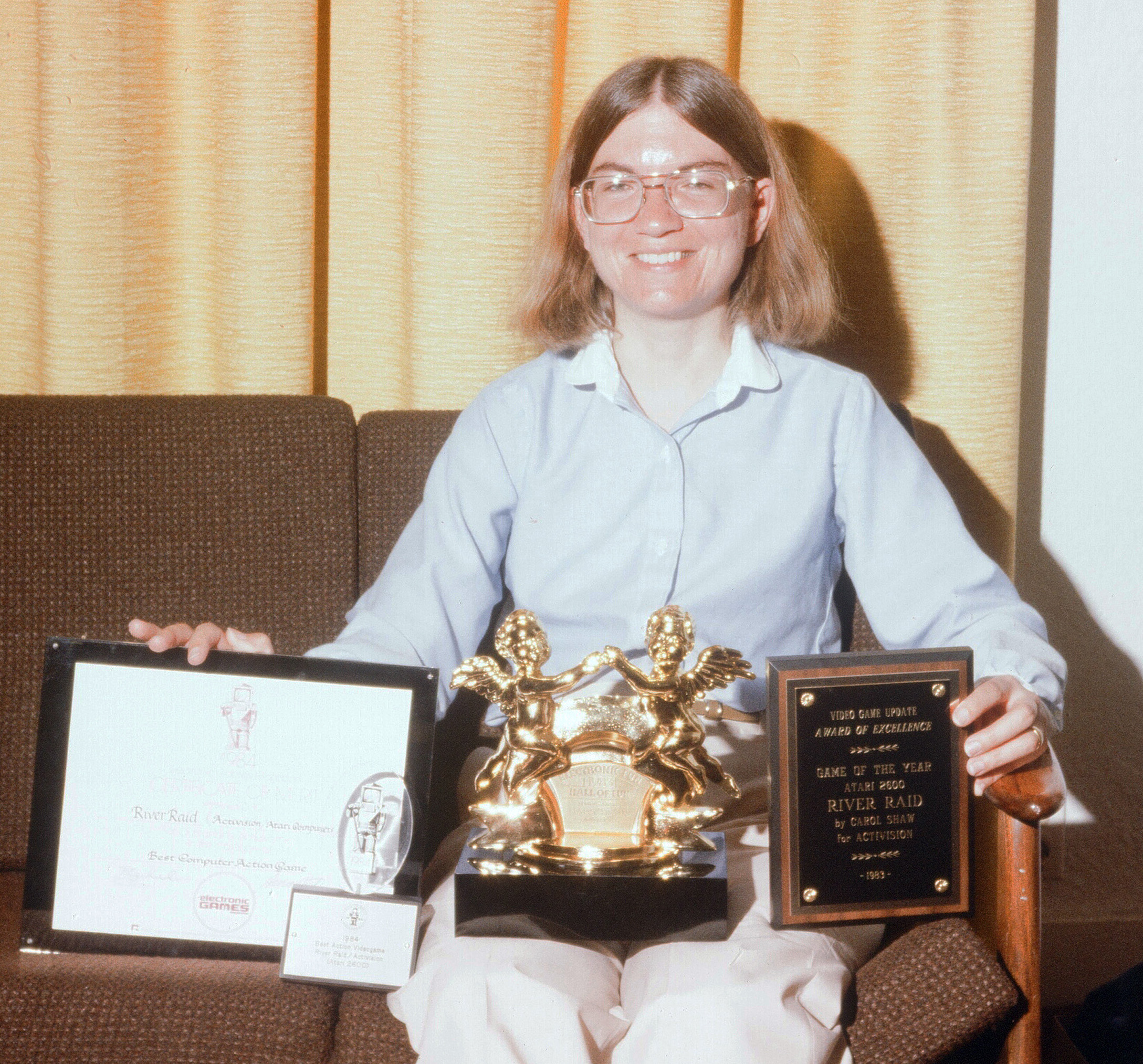
Carol Shaw won several awards for River Raid. In 2017, Shaw won The Game Awards Industry Icon Award.

Shaw left Activision and the video game industry after programming the game Happy Trails (1983) for the Intellivision and releasing ports of River Raid for the Atari 5200 and 800 computer system. In 2017, Shaw won The Game Awards Industry Icon Award for her contributions to the video game industry.

River Raid popularized vertically scrolling shooters among the home console audiences. The Atari 2600 was experiencing what video game historian Brett Weiss described as "a resurgence of sorts" after Nintendo had success in the marketplace with the Nintendo Entertainment System. Atari had just re-released the system as a smaller budget-priced revision in 1986. Atari had convinced Activision to develop more games for the Atari 2600, starting with a port of the game Ghostbusters (1984). Activision released River Raid II, which was designed by Dan Kitchen and coded by David Lubar. Kitchen explained that at this time, Activision wanted to focus on licenses and brands over original concepts, and as River Raid was one of the top-selling games, they wanted a sequel to capitalize on it. Lubar had previously coded games for 20th Century Fox and Spectravideo. Lubar recalled that making the game was "tough, really tough since I knew how good the original River Raid was and assumed people would make comparisons". River Raid II uses the same polynomial algorithm Shaw used to create the scrolling playfield to have the sequel resemble the original game. The game was developed in about five months and sold over 501,000 copies.

A third game, River Raid: The Mission of No Return, was shown at the 1991 Summer Consumer Electronics Show for the Super Nintendo Entertainment System, but was never released. Next Generation reported that the game was cancelled following poor reception at the event. As of 2021, there have been no further official sequels to the game.

== See also ==
- List of Activision games: 1980–1999
- List of best-selling Atari 2600 video games
