= MLB.com =

Official website of Major League Baseball

- Website type: Baseball
- Headquarters: Manhattan, New York City, US
- Owner: MLB Advanced Media (Major League Baseball)
- Creator: Major League Baseball
- Website: www.mlb.com
- Launched: 1995
- Current status: Public

MLB.com is the official site of Major League Baseball (MLB) and is overseen by Major League Baseball Advanced Media, L.P., which is a subsidiary of MLB. MLB.com is a source of baseball-related information, including baseball news, statistics, and sports columns. MLB.com is also a commercial site, providing online streaming video and streaming audio broadcasts of all Major League Baseball games to paying subscribers, as well as "gameday", a near-live streaming box score of baseball games for free. In addition, MLB.com sells official baseball merchandise, allows users to buy tickets to baseball games, runs fantasy baseball leagues, and runs auctions of baseball memorabilia. In association with HB Studios, MLB.com has also developed recent R.B.I. Baseball installments.

== History ==
Major League Baseball's previous website was at www.MajorLeagueBaseball.com. The MLB.com domain name was originally registered in 1994 by Morgan, Lewis & Bockius LLP, a Philadelphia-based law firm. In September 2000, Morgan Lewis & Bockius agreed to transfer the domain name to Major League Baseball. The longer address remains as a redirect to MLB.com to prevent cybersquatting.

== MLB.tv ==
MLB.tv is an American subscription based audio and video service which through two different service tiers allows users to listen and watch high quality out of market MLB games live via a high-speed Internet connection (subject to blackout restrictions). Currently users can subscribe to the "MLB.tv All Teams" package which access to every MLB teams live feeds as well as in-game highlights and stats and live DVR control, full game archives and pitch widget. The other option, the "MLB.tv Single Team" gives subscribers access to a single MLB team's live audio and video feeds (subject to blackout restrictions) as well as in-game highlights, stats and live DVR controls.

Previously MLB.tv services were offered as a "Basic" and "Premium" tiers with basic receiving only HD quality audio and video on their desktop or laptop devices whereas the Premium subscribers were given access to live game audio and video on desktop and laptop as well as on mobile devices such as Android or iOS devices through a free subscription to the At-Bat mobile app and through certain connected devices including smart televisions, Blu-ray players, TiVo DVRs, PlayStation 3, PlayStation 4, PlayStation 5, Xbox 360, and Xbox One. MLB.TV has since eliminated these restrictions and now users of both the "All Teams" and "Single Team" tier can share the same access including new access via an Amazon Fire TV, Google Chromecast and Roku devices.

Starting with the 2012 season MLB.TV Premium had begun a service called Audio Overlay which allows the user to replace the video's home or away audio with the audio feed from the home or away radio feed (Away team audio overlay is only available to MLB.TV Premium subscribers) or Park which removes all audio commentary and lets the viewer hear the ball park's natural sounds. As with MLB's Extra Innings cable and satellite television service, normal blackout restrictions apply where applicable, see below. This service has since been discontinued starting with the new subscription tier.

MLB.tv also includes MLB Network (US Only as 2024), games from other baseball tournaments such as Minor League Baseball, LIDOM, Caribbean Series and qualifier games of the World Baseball Classic.

Beginning in the 2026 season as part of MLB's revised contract with ESPN, MLB.tv is sold exclusively via the ESPN app for new subscribers; if they are not already a subscriber or eligible to access the service, new users are required to sign up for a one-month free trial of ESPN Unlimited, but the subscription may be cancelled at any time without penalty. The change does not affect existing subscribers that have automatic renewals, who will continue to access the services and be billed via MLB platforms. However, subscribers may optionally link their existing MLB.tv accounts to the ESPN app to access its content from within ESPN platforms. ESPN will also offer 10% discounts on MLB.tv subscriptions for ESPN Unlimited subscribers. Customers who receive access to MLB.tv via promotions with T-Mobile are also unaffected, and can access the service via either MLB or ESPN platforms. It is anticipated that ESPN will not distribute MLB.tv's in-market streaming packages (including those of MLB Local Media teams) until at least 2027.

=== MLB Big Inning ===
MLB Big Inning is a feature of MLB.tv, which presents whiparound coverage of MLB games that air on the MLB.tv service, including live action and highlights. The service was introduced in 2021, and airs every weeknight. The broadcast is occasionally simulcast on MLB Network, albeit with limited full screen commercial interruptions. In local areas served by MLB Local Media, MLB Big Inning is aired if a game is delayed.

The service is similar to the existing MLB Strike Zone service; both services air a similar whiparound format.

=== Blackout restrictions ===
MLB games in the United States, Canada, South Korea, Guam and the U.S. Virgin Islands are subject to blackout restrictions. In Guam, all live San Francisco Giants and Athletics games are blacked out. Games are blacked out to all users within the home television territory assigned to each team, irrespective of whether local television stations air those teams' games. Since 2014, customers can also watch Fox Saturday Baseball out-of-market games on split-national windows.

Any game that is blacked out is made available as an archived game approximately 90 minutes after the conclusion of each game.

MLB.com can check a viewer's origin by using IP address information, but some users have reported inaccuracy of the ISP-based targeting used, thus leaving many fans unable to watch games on MLB.com.

=== In-market broadcasts ===
MLB offers subscription services for in-market fans to stream games for 22 of its 30 teams. Of these, 14 teams' broadcasts are produced by MLB Local Media, a division of the league.

During the 2023 season, as a result of bankruptcy proceedings involving Diamond Sports Group (now Main Street Sports Group), MLB acquired the local broadcast rights to the San Diego Padres and Arizona Diamondbacks. As part of new broadcasting agreements via MLB Local Media, MLB.tv began to offer in-market, direct-to-consumer (DTC) packages for both teams. The games are also distributed by participating television providers in the teams' local markets. MLB.tv allows customers to bundle in-market streaming packages with its out-of-market service.

Beginning in the 2024 season, these two services began to be branded as "Padres.tv" and "DBacks.tv". In addition, MLB also took over rights to the Colorado Rockies in 2024, after the shutdown of AT&T SportsNet Rocky Mountain. In 2025, the Cleveland Guardians and Minnesota Twins also moved from Main Street to MLB Local Media. Prior to the 2025 season, Major League Baseball reached agreements with the Athletics, Los Angeles Dodgers, San Francisco Giants, New York Mets and Philadelphia Phillies to launch direct-to-consumer streaming services distributed via MLB.tv. For all teams except the Dodgers, subscribers can bundle in-market streaming with MLB.tv's out-of-market streaming service.

For the 2026 season, MLB Local Media added the rights to nine additional teams (Cincinnati Reds, Detroit Tigers, Kansas City Royals, Miami Marlins, Milwaukee Brewers, St. Louis Cardinals, Tampa Bay Rays, Seattle Mariners, and Washington Nationals). Three other teams (Atlanta Braves, Baltimore Orioles, and Los Angeles Angels) launched direct-to-consumer streaming services distributed via MLB.tv for 2026.

== MLB.com At Bat ==
A screenshot of the MLB.com At Bat 2010 iPhone App scoreboard page, showing scores for May 7, 2010

MLB.com At Bat was a mobile application available for different platforms including iOS (a universal app which works on iPhone and iPod Touch), iPadOS, Android, BlackBerry, and HP TouchPad/webOS. The iOS application featured "live audio, in-game video highlights, pitch-by-pitch live data and more." (Users may view live games if they log in with MLB.tv subscriptions.) The BlackBerry and Android application featured "real-time scores, live audio, in-game highlights and more." The application was free (although it required a subscription to MLB.TV to unlock its full functionality) and was available on the App Store, Google Play, and BlackBerry App World stores. MLB distributes a new application for each season; the 2012 version was the first to be available free of charge. Later the app's functionality was integrated into the standard MLB app, and it has since been removed.

A social networking app, MLB Ballpark, is also available. The free app allows fans to view ballpark maps, post to assorted social networking sites (via 'checking in' when they attend games), and in some ballparks, order concessions directly from their mobile devices.

== MLB.com Fantasy ==
MLB.com Fantasy has many games and simulations, including Beat the Streak, which started in 2001. Beat the Streak is a game where a player is picked for each day, and if that player gets at least one hit, one's streak continues. The goal is to reach a 57-game streak (one more than Joe DiMaggio's famed 56-game streak), to win a grand total of $5.6 million. As of 2021, the contest has never had a winner, despite some tweaks to make the goal more attainable.

== Customer service complaints ==
According to the Better Business Bureau: "Consumers previously reported to the BBB their subscriptions were automatically renewed with MLB Advanced Media even though they had cancelled their plans within the specified cancellation period. MLB Advanced Media has taken steps to address these concerns by adding more prominent disclosures and an opt-out feature."

In 2009, opening week games were not available as archives, and users reported limited High Definition service available.
