= R.B.I. Baseball 15 =

2015 video game

- Cover art featuring Anthony Rizzo
- Developer: HB Studios
- Publisher: MLB Advanced Media
- Series: R.B.I. Baseball
- Platforms: PlayStation 4, Xbox One, Windows, Mac, iOS
- Release: PS4, Xbox; March 31, 2015; iOS; April 23, 2015; Windows, Mac; April 30, 2015
- Genre: Sports
- Modes: Single-player, multiplayer

R.B.I. Baseball 15 is a 2015 baseball video game developed by HB Studios and published by MLB Advanced Media. It is the sequel to R.B.I. Baseball 14 and the second game in the reboot R.B.I. Baseball series. The game was released for PlayStation 4 and Xbox One on March 31, and was ported to iOS, Windows, and Mac in April. The Xbox One version received negative reviews.

== Gameplay ==
A pitcher prepares to throw a baseball at the batter

R.B.I Baseball 15 is a baseball arcade game that includes 25-man rosters and every official MLB team. Each team has its own modeled ballpark. Batting and pitching statistics are tracked throughout a season. The game can be played in single-player or multiplayer. There are three levels of difficulty for season, post-season or exhibition games.

The team lineup can be adjusted and up-to-date rosters can be downloaded to reflect the current season. Players can move the pitcher and choose to throw a regular pitch, a fast pitch, or a knuckleball. The pitch can be steered left or right while in flight. While batting, the player can swing high, resulting in a grounder or fly ball, or low, for a bunt. A height indicator shows where the ball will land.

== Development and release ==
MLB Advanced Media worked with the Canadian developer HB Studios on R.B.I. Baseball 15. MLB announced the game for PC, Mac, PlayStation 4, Xbox One, Android, and iOS on February 9, 2015. Chicago Cubs's first baseman Anthony Rizzo would appear on the cover art, Baseball Hall Of Fame inductee Pedro Martínez reached an agreement with the league to promote the game.

R.B.I. Baseball 15 was released for PlayStation 4 and Xbox One on March 31, 2015. The other versions of R.B.I. Baseball 15 were expected to launch after Opening Day, which was April 5. The PC Mac versions were available for pre-order through Steam. The game was ported to iOS on April 23, and the PC version released on April 30.

== Reception ==
Reception

Aggregate score
Aggregator	Score
Metacritic	XBO: 46/100 (Note: Score based on 4 reviews.)

Review scores
Publication	Score
IGN	4.9/10
PC Gamer (US)	45%
Push Square	4/10
USgamer	3/5

R.B.I. Baseball 15 received "generally unfavorable" reviews for the Xbox One version, according to review aggregator Metacritic.

Push Square reviewer Graham Banas called the controls "highly intuitive", while PC Gamer's Christopher Livingston was disappointed in their straightforwardness. Banas felt that the game was too similar to MLB: The Show, and believed that Super Mega Baseball was a better game. Dave Rudden of IGN said that R.B.I 15 improved its on-field experience since R.B.I. Baseball 14. Banas wrote that it followed its predecessor by delivering a "boring effort". Referring to the single-player mode, Livingston thought it should be called R.B.I. Baseball 2017 and put into early access.

The animation was criticized by Banas as "terrible" and looking "ancient", while Livingston felt it was not great. Rudden felt that the glitches hampered the fun. Livingston agreed writing every game he played was "tarnished" by a bug". USgamer's Jaz Rignall did not feel that pitching and hitting were robust enough to appeal to anyone but the most casual gamers.
