= Indiana Jones and the Temple of Doom (1985 video game) =

1985 video game

- North American arcade flyer
- Developer: Atari Games
- Publishers: Atari Games; Ports: NA: Mindscape; EU: U.S. Gold
- Director: Peter Lipson
- Producer: Mike Hally
- Designers: Mike Hally; Peter Lipson; Earl Vickers
- Programmer: Peter Lipson
- Artists: Susan G. McBride; Alan Murphy; Will Noble; Dave Ralston
- Composers: Hal Canon; Dennis Harper
- Series: Indiana Jones
- Platforms: Arcade, Amiga, Amstrad CPC, Apple II, Atari ST, Commodore 64, MS-DOS, MSX, ZX Spectrum
- Release: August 1985
- Genre: Action
- Modes: Single-player, multiplayer
- Arcade system: Atari System 1

Indiana Jones and the Temple of Doom is an action game developed by Atari Games and released in arcades in 1985. It is based on the 1984 film of the same name, the second film in the Indiana Jones franchise. It is the first Atari System 1 arcade game to include digitized speech, including voice clips of Harrison Ford as Indiana Jones and Amrish Puri as Mola Ram, as well as John Williams's music from the film.

== Gameplay ==
Mine scene in the arcade original

The player assumes the role of Indiana Jones as he infiltrates the lair of the evil Thuggee cult, armed with his trademark whip. Controls consist of an eight-position joystick and a button to use the whip. The player's ultimate goal is to free the children the cult has kidnapped as slaves, recover the stolen relics known as "Sankara Stones", escape the temple, and defeat the cult leader Mola Ram.

After selecting one of three difficulty levels, the player progresses through three stages based on different scenes from the film:

1. Rescuing captive children from the mines, while avoiding Thuggee guards and other dangers such as snakes, bats, and floor spikes.
2. Escaping from the Thuggee guards in a mine cart without crashing into dead ends or falling off collapsed sections of track.
3. Recovering a Sankara Stone from the Thuggee sacrificial altar.

One life is lost whenever Indy touches a hazard or enemy character, falls from too great a height, crashes his mine cart, or falls into lava. The whip can be used to destroy or stun enemies and to swing across gaps in the mines.

The cycle repeats four times, adding more hazards each time. On the fourth repetition, the altar scene is replaced by a final confrontation with Mola Ram, on a rope bridge over a river. If the player completes this scene, Mola Ram falls to his death and the player advances to a bonus stage in the mines, picking up golden statues for extra points. This stage continues until all remaining lives are lost.

== Ports ==
Ports of the game were later developed by Paragon Programming and released by U.S. Gold for the Amstrad CPC, Commodore 64, MSX, and ZX Spectrum in 1987. The ZX Spectrum version game went to number 1 in the Woolworths sales charts. During the same year, Mindscape ported it to the Atari ST and the Commodore 64 (different compared to U.S. Gold's version). In 1989, Mindscape ported it to the Amiga and personal computers that use MS-DOS. The NES version was ported by Tengen in December 1988. The Apple II version was ported by Papyrus Design Group in June 1989 for Tengen.

== Reception ==
Reception

Award
Publication	Award
Computer and Video Games	C+VG Hit

In Japan, Game Machine listed Indiana Jones and the Temple of Doom on their December 15, 1985 issue as being the fourth most-successful upright/cockpit arcade unit of the month.

Computer and Video Games, reviewing the ZX Spectrum, Amstrad CPC and Atari ST versions, called the game "quite an accurate and splendid conversion", particularly the Atari ST version. The magazine praised the game's playability, but criticized its difficulty and sound effects.

Jonathan Sutyak of AllGame, who gave the Commodore 64 version one and a half stars out of five, called the game a "major disappointment". Sutyak criticized the gameplay and "terrible" controls, and wrote: "Graphically the game is a mess. Most of the game is brown and gray, very unappealing. [...] Sounds are not great either but they are a bit better than the graphics. Theme music plays in the background which is the best part of the game. Most of the sound effects are not sharp and not enough of them exist. Indiana Jones and the Temple of Doom is a bad game all the way around. It looks bad, has bad controls, and is way too short."
