= Indiana Jones and the Temple of Doom (1988 video game) =

- Box art, featuring art by Drew Struzan
- Developer: Tengen
- Publishers: Mindscape (original); Tengen (re-release)
- Programmer: Bob Flanagan
- Artists: Susan G. McBride; Sam Comstock
- Composer: Brad Fuller
- Series: Indiana Jones
- Platform: Nintendo Entertainment System
- Release: December 1988
- Genre: Action
- Mode: Single-player

Indiana Jones and the Temple of Doom is an action game released in 1988 for the Nintendo Entertainment System. The game is based on the 1985 arcade game and 1984 film of the same name. The resulting product differed from the arcade version in several aspects, but kept the same underlying premise and style.

The game was originally released by Mindscape in December 1988. The publishing rights reverted to Tengen the following year and it announced plans to re-release the game that October. Indiana Jones and the Temple of Doom gives the player control of Indiana Jones as he makes his way through the temple in a series of 12 levels or "waves". In the final wave, the player must defeat the villain of the film, Mola Ram, on a rope bridge that recreates the final scene in the movie. Reception of the game was generally negative.

== Version history ==
The film Indiana Jones and the Temple of Doom was released in 1984 and starred Harrison Ford as Indiana Jones. A year later, in 1985, Atari Games capitalized on the franchise by releasing the initial arcade version of the game. This version was a platform game and featured theme music and sound clips from the actual film. The game takes place over three zones that are based on the movie's plot, where the objective is to free the slave children and recover the Sankara Stones. In 1987, were released for the Commodore 64, Amstrad CPC, ZX Spectrum, and MSX. Further ports of the game for the Amiga, Atari ST, DOS, and Apple II were released in 1989.

The NES version of Temple of Doom was released twice. The first version was licensed by Nintendo and released by Mindscape in December 1988 in the form of a standard grey NES cartridge. The second version, released by Tengen after the rights reverted from Mindscape, came in a black cartridge that is differently shaped. By that point, Tengen had split from Nintendo and was releasing unlicensed games that attempted to circumvent the need for a 10NES lockout chip. Nintendo filed suit and Tengen lost, forcing it to remove its NES games from the market. Aside from the differences in cover art and cartridge form, the actual software of the two NES releases is identical.

There are several differences between the arcade game and its NES adaptation, which features new expanded play mechanics. In the original arcade version, the Sankara Stones were not all found in one location at the end of a wave. Instead, Jones had to travel through a temple every two rounds. In addition, the game bestows upon the player more weapons and items for Jones to collect from the slave children he frees, and adds the ability to jump upward.

== Plot and gameplay ==
The Sankara Stones in Wave 9.

The plot of the NES version follows the storyline of the original film. At the onset of the game, Jones has just reached the Pankot Palace featured in the movie and is preparing to free the slave children, recover the missing Sankara Stones and defeat Mola Ram and his Thuggee entourage. The game differs from the original arcade version in many respects, including the layout and the manner in which one progresses through the game, but the plot remains unchanged in both versions.

The player advances through 12 levels (called "waves"), the first nine of which require Jones to travel through the palace and recover the Sankara Stones. In these stages, the player may restart the game with all items intact in the last area reached. Afterwards, if the player dies, they must return to the Chamber of Kali (Wave 9) and finish the game from that point. Each level also has a timer that goes from 99 to zero. If time runs out, the player is confronted by Mola Ram and loses one life and all of their items. All levels also contain mine cart rooms, where Jones can ride the rails through the levels across hazards and past enemies.

Wave 9 requires the player to cross a river of lava by stunning the monsters that live there. Once across, Jones must grab the Sankara Stones to progress to the Map Room where he can use the map pieces he has collected to figure out where the secret door exit is in Wave 10. Alternatively, there is a secret idol in Wave 8 that will reveal the hidden exit. To pass requires the use of both TNT and the Sankara Stones. Wave 11 leads to the exit and Wave 12 recreates the scene with the rope bridge and the final battle with Mola Ram.

The game contains a variety of elements that both aid and hinder the player's progress through the waves. At his disposal, Jones has TNT, guns, swords, hats for extra lives, jewels for extra time and his classic whip. Opposing him are bats, rats, snakes, spiders and an endless supply of Thugee servants. In addition, if Jones lands in any of the lava pits, crashes a mine cart or hits a boulder or spike trap, he loses one life.

== Reception ==
Although hyped up in Nintendo Power's "Video Shorts" section as an upcoming release, Indiana Jones and the Temple of Doom met with generally negative reception. Aside from the difficulty level of the game, the official reviewer for the Indiana Jones fan community TheRaider.net noted that Jones' new jumping ability is glitchy, causing him to leap downwards no matter which direction he is facing, unless the player is holding down the button for the particular direction in which they want to jump. Also cited as flaws are poor controls, unappealing graphics, the number of enemies, and the text-only ending screen. The reviewer admitted, however, that the game's "respectable attempt to preserve John Williams' musical score" was one of its only highlights. The original arcade version was the first Atari System 1 game to talk to the players using speech capability, a feature lacking in the console version due to the limitations of the hardware. The arcade game, like the console adaptation, obtained its theme music (as well as sound effects that were absent on the NES version) from the film itself.

Skyler Miller, a reviewer at Allgame who compared the console adaptation to the original game, admitted that the graphics are "recognizable", but claims that the version was "missing much of the original's detail and character." Miller's final judgment was to call it "a passable effort" and to compare unfavorably to the arcade version. Edward J. Semrad, a contemporary technical writer and computer specialist with the Milwaukee Journal Sentinel included the game in his list of games that were "watered-down versions of what we see in the arcades" and praised the PC version for its superiority.
