= Atari Games Corp. v. Nintendo of America Inc. =

Legal dispute between Atari and Nintendo

- Court: United States Court of Appeals for the Federal Circuit
- Full case name: ATARI GAMES CORP. and Tengen, Inc., Plaintiffs-Appellants, v. NINTENDO OF AMERICA INC. and Nintendo Co., Ltd., Defendants-Appellees.
- Decided: September 10, 1992
- Citation: 975 F.2d 832

Holding
- Atari was held liable for copyright infringement, affirming the district court's decision.

Court membership
- Judges sitting: Raymond C. Clevenger, Edward Samuel Smith, Randall Ray Rader

Case opinions
- Majority: Randall Ray Rader

Atari Games Corp. v. Nintendo of America Inc., 975 F.2d 832 (Fed. Cir. 1992), was a U.S. legal case in which Atari Games engaged in copyright infringement by copying Nintendo's lock-out system, the 10NES. The 10NES was designed to prevent Nintendo's video game console, the Nintendo Entertainment System (NES), from playing unauthorized game cartridges. Atari, after unsuccessful attempts to reverse engineer the lock-out system, obtained an unauthorized copy of the source code from the United States Copyright Office and used it to create its 10NES replica, the Rabbit. Atari then sued Nintendo for unfair competition and copyright misuse, and Nintendo responded that Atari had engaged in unfair competition, copyright infringement, and patent infringement.

The United States District Court for the Northern District of California granted a preliminary injunction against Atari, and this was affirmed by the court of appeals. However, the United States Court of Appeals for the Federal Circuit differed from the district court on whether reverse engineering could hypothetically be allowed, declaring that "reverse engineering, untainted by the purloined copy of the 10NES program and necessary to understand 10NES, is a fair use." Thus, Atari was denied the fair use exception to copyright infringement, due to the illicit way they obtained Nintendo's source code.

One month after the decision, a similar ruling in Sega v. Accolade determined that reverse engineering was fair use. Several legal scholars have concluded that the main difference between the cases was that Atari had lied to obtain an unauthorized copy of Nintendo's code. Legal scholars have argued that reverse engineering has since been curtailed by the Digital Millennium Copyright Act of 2000, upsetting the balance established in the Atari and Accolade cases.

== Background ==
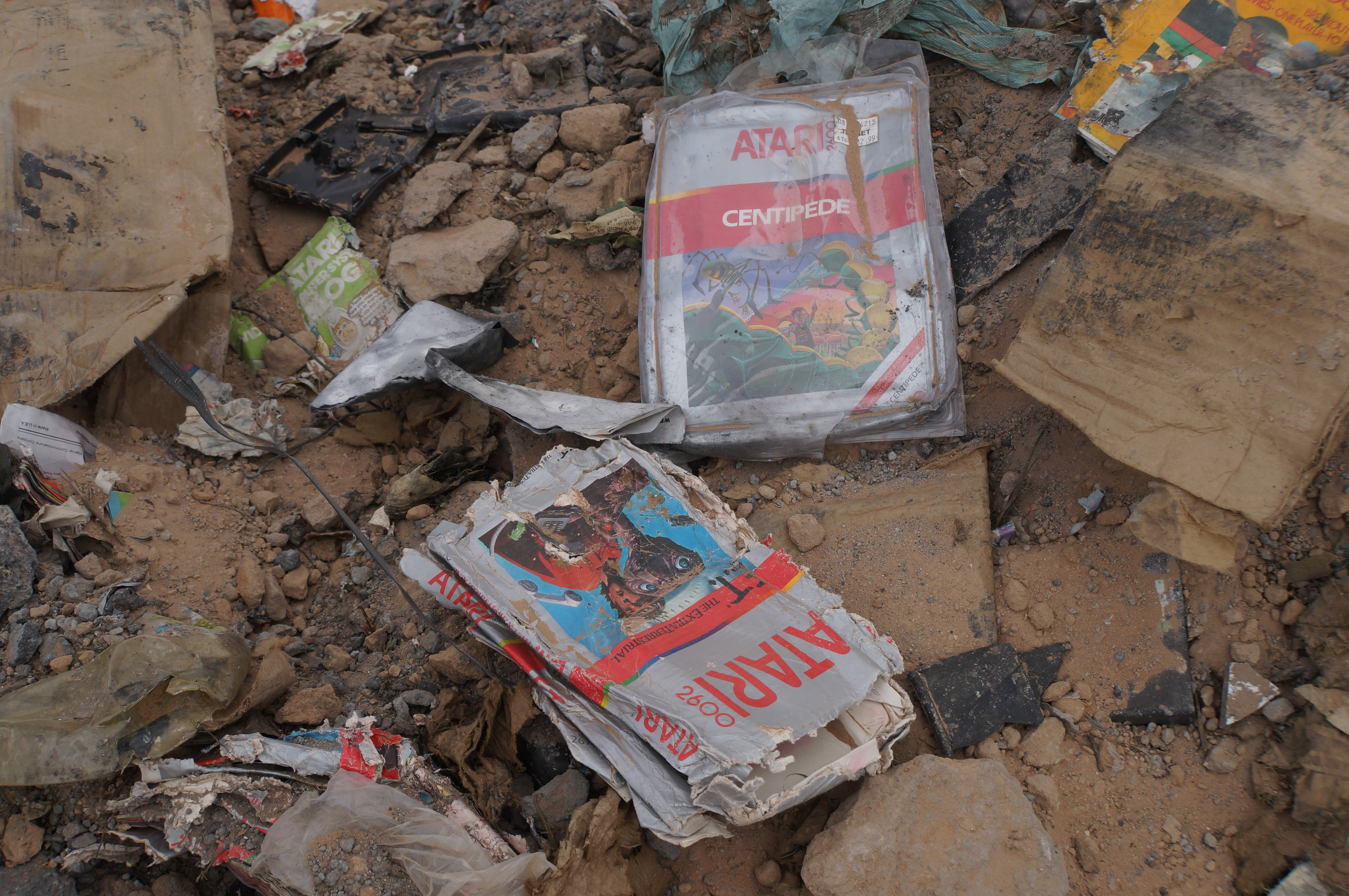
The video game crash of 1983 was partially caused by the overabundance of games, seen in this 2014 excavation of a landfill used in the Atari video game burial.

Until 1980, the Atari VCS was the only major console on the market, with all games produced in-house, by Atari, Inc. After several Atari employees left to found Activision in 1979, Atari sued them for violating a non-disclosure agreement, and attempted to prevent Activision from producing games for the Atari console. The court refused to grant an injunction against Activision, and the two companies settled out of court in 1982, leading to the first official third-party video games for the Atari VCS. Soon after, the United States saw the proliferation of video game consoles, as well as many low-quality games produced by third-party developers. In 1982, the number of Atari games on the market grew from under 100 to over 400 by the end of the year, and experts began to warn of an oversupply. The number of games over-saturated the market, and was a factor that led to the video game crash of 1983 in North America.

Around this time, Nintendo was planning to enter the North American console market by launching a version of its Japanese Family Computer (Famicom) console. To differentiate the Famicom from failed consoles in America, Nintendo rebranded it as the Nintendo Entertainment System (NES) and its cartridges as Game Paks, with a design reminiscent of a VCR. To limit the flood of games that led to the 1983 crash as well as bootlegging problems seen in Asia, Nintendo created the proprietary 10NES system, a lockout chip that would only allow the NES to play a cartridge with an authorized "key". Game developers were only authorized if they agreed to Nintendo's licensing terms, preventing any developer from releasing more than two games per year, and limiting "inappropriate" content such as religious themes or excessive violence. This led Nintendo to add the Official Nintendo Seal of Quality to their games, signaling to customers that their games met a consistent standard.

The strategy allowed Nintendo to avoid some of the mistakes of other consoles in the market, including the older Atari 2600. According to Nintendo president Hiroshi Yamauchi, "Atari collapsed because they gave too much freedom to third-party developers and the market was swamped with rubbish games." Officially launched in 1985, the NES quickly became a commercial success outside of Japan. By the end of the decade, it was estimated that Nintendo's products were in 15–20 million homes in America, or 30% of American households. Nintendo accounted for 80% of the video game market at an estimate $2.7 billion in sales per year, which was more than the market for all home computer software.

=== Reverse engineering ===
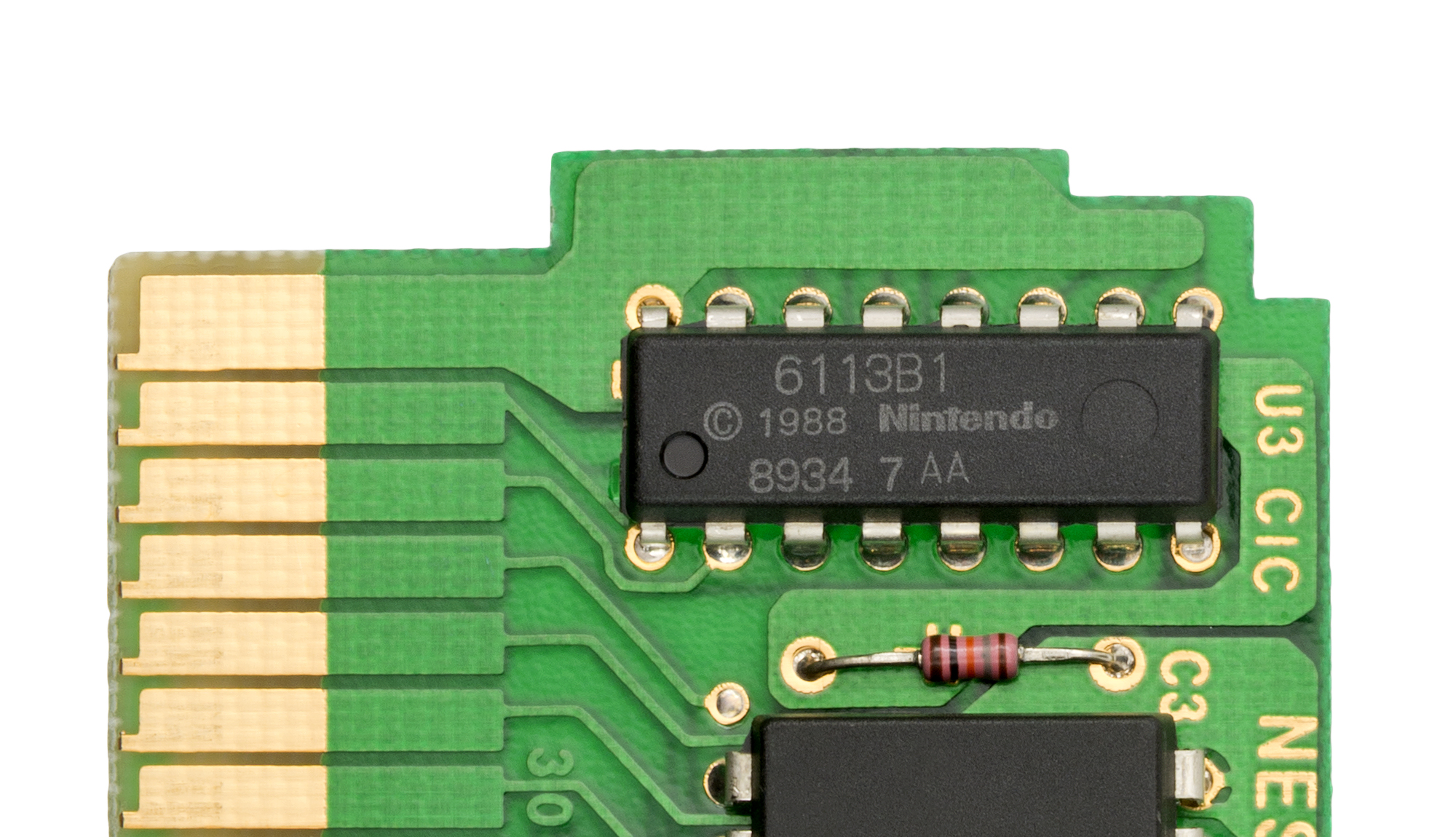
In order for a game cartridge to function on the Nintendo Entertainment System, it needed to contain Nintendo's proprietary 10NES chip.

In 1986, Atari Games formed a subsidiary called Tengen to produce third-party games for the NES. Meanwhile, Atari also attempted to reverse engineer the 10NES, which included monitoring communications between the console and cartridge chips, chemically peeling layers from the chip, and microscopically examining the code embodied in the chip's silicon. When Atari failed in their efforts, they negotiated to become an official Nintendo licensee in 1987. In addition to complying with the 10NES lockout system, Atari agreed to a standard term where their games would be exclusive to Nintendo for two years.

However, Atari continued their efforts to decipher the 10NES. In 1988, Atari had its lawyers obtain the source code for the 10NES from the Copyright Office, by falsely alleging that a copy of the code was needed for litigation, even though no case was pending. Atari used this copy to develop its replica of the 10NES, the Rabbit, which generated signals functionally indistinguishable from the 10NES.

In December 1988, Atari filed a lawsuit against Nintendo for unfair competition, antitrust violations under the Sherman Act, and patent infringement. Nintendo responded in November 1989, counter-suing Atari for unfair competition, as well as infringing both its copyright and patent for its cartridge authentication system. Both parties motioned for a preliminary injunction against the other, with Nintendo asking the trial court to stop Atari's infringement of the 10NES copyright, and Atari asking the court to stop Nintendo's misuse of that copyright to commit antitrust violations.

== Ruling ==
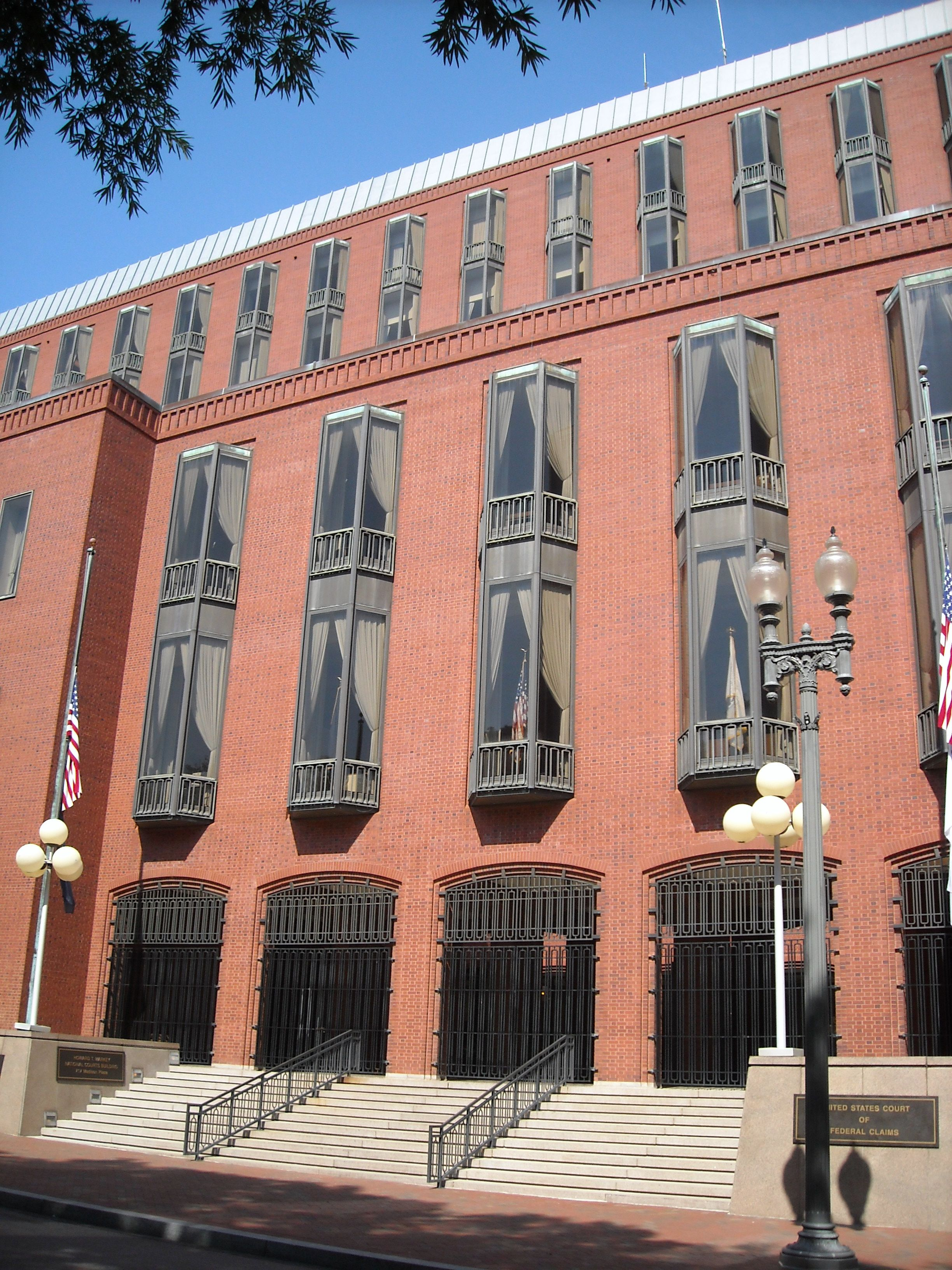
The Howard T. Markey National Courts Building (formerly known as the National Courts Building) houses the United States Court of Appeals for the Federal Circuit.

=== District court ===
The two cases were consolidated by The District Court for the Northern District of California. The court heard both parties' motions for preliminary injunctions, and Nintendo prevailed in both instances. Nintendo argued that Atari infringed their copyright by copying their code from the Copyright Office, making an intermediate copy of their code during the reverse engineering process, and creating a program substantially similar to their code. The court found that Atari had acquired the 10NES source code from the Copyright Office under false pretenses, and concluded that Nintendo was likely to succeed in their claim for copyright infringement, should the case proceed to trial. Thus, Atari was enjoined from selling any unauthorized games until said trial. Atari initially appealed both decisions, but decided to dismiss their own motion for a preliminary injunction.

=== Appeal ===
The appeal was heard by United States Court of Appeals for the Federal Circuit, which affirmed the lower court's injunction against Atari. The appellate court found that the 10NES contained protected expression, applying the precedent from Computer Associates International v. Altai to establish that the 10NES code was expressed in a unique way that is not inherent to the idea. The court also ruled that Nintendo had proven a likelihood of success in their copyright claim, because Atari made unauthorized copies of the 10NES code from the Copyright Office, and that Atari's Rabbit program was also substantially similar to Nintendo's 10NES.

However, the appeals court differed from the lower court's reasoning on the question of reverse engineering and fair use. Determining that intermediate copying is not actionable in of itself, the appeals court stated that "reverse engineering, untainted by the purloined copy of the 10NES program and necessary to understand 10NES, is a fair use". However, fair use in intermediate copying does not extend to commercial exploitation of protected expression. Moreover, Atari could not invoke fair use because they used an unauthorized copy of the code, obtained from the Copyright Office under false pretenses. Lastly, the court rejected Atari's defense that Nintendo was misusing its copyright, because Atari had "unclean hands" after lying to the Copyright Office.

== Effects ==
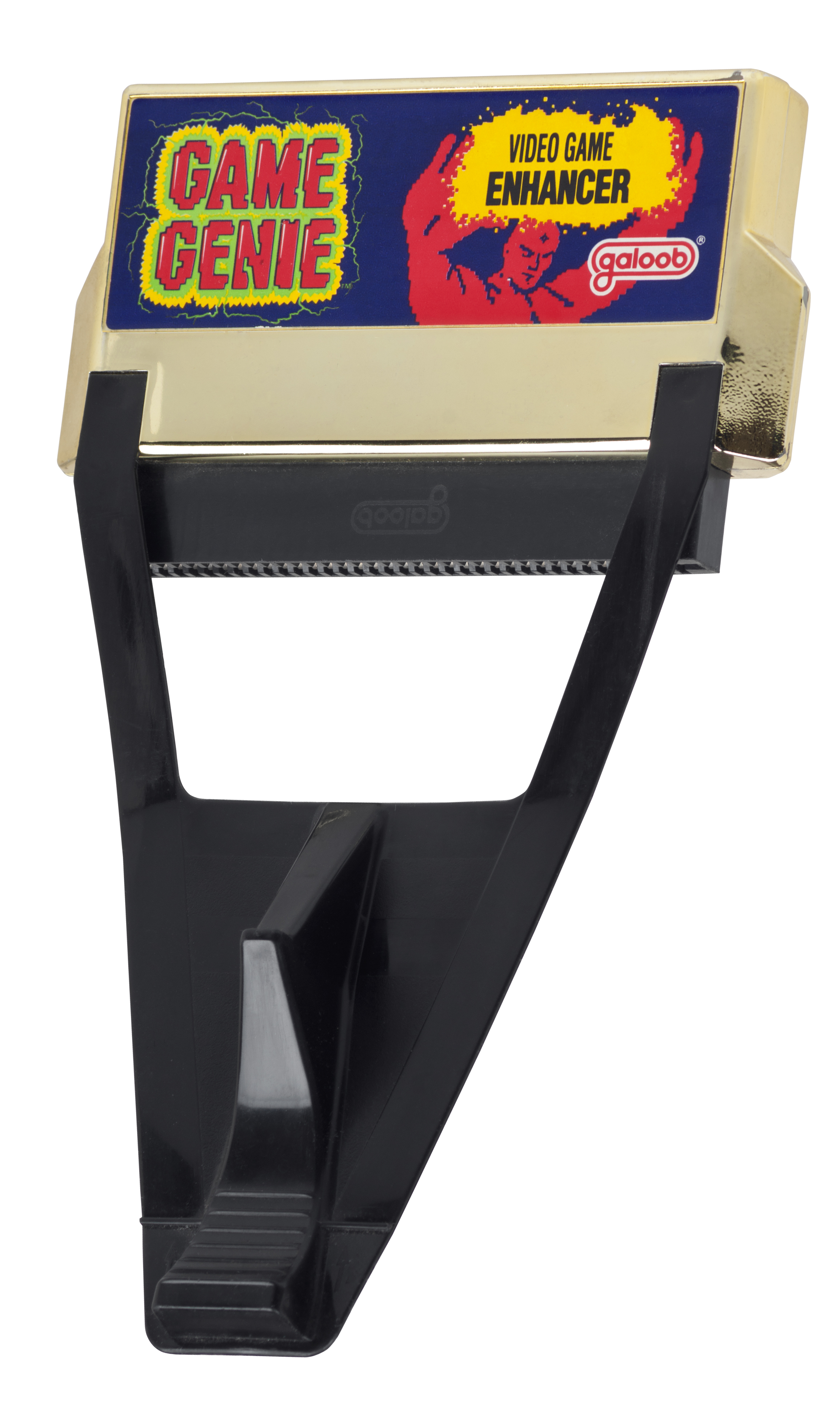
Nintendo later lost a 1992 lawsuit against Galoob involving the attachable Game Genie hardware, where Codemasters successfully reverse engineered the Nintendo Entertainment System.

The lawsuit finally reached a settlement in 1994, with Atari Games paying Nintendo for damages and use of several intellectual property licenses. Atari and Nintendo had several contemporaneous lawsuits, including a dispute over the rights to publish Tetris. Nintendo successfully sued Atari Games subsidiary Tengen, establishing their exclusivity over the Tetris license, and hastening the decline of Tengen's business.

Other companies were able to circumvent the 10NES lockout system, but they faced barriers to selling those games in stores, unlike Atari. In the book The Video Game Explosion, Dominic Arsenault noted that Atari could afford an expensive legal battle with Nintendo, while most developers simply agreed to Nintendo's terms. Research professor Casey O’Donnell concluded that this allowed Nintendo to sell their consoles at a loss, while using enforced scarcity to keep the price of games higher for Nintendo and their authorized developers.

Although Nintendo succeeded in court due to Atari's foul play, the company faced a trend of litigation over unfair business practices and other monopolistic behavior. Atari Corporation (a wholly separate company from Atari Games) also sued Nintendo for seeking to monopolize the game business, but Nintendo was exonerated of any unfair business practices. Under further legal pressure, Nintendo soon began to shift their legal strategy. When Nintendo was accused of fixing their prices with retailers, Nintendo settled with the Federal Trade Commission without admitting to any wrongdoing, offering to pay $5 million in legal costs and millions of $5 coupons to their past customers. Nintendo began to ease their licensing restrictions to avoid accusations of monopoly. By the early 1990s, Nintendo began losing developers to the Sega Genesis, and the competition forced Nintendo to make further concessions to developers. Nintendo later lost a lawsuit against Galoob over the Game Genie, signalling a change in the legality of third party game products of all kinds. Nintendo also sued Blockbuster to prevent them from renting their games, but could only prove copyright infringement in their photocopied game manuals, allowing the game rental business to continue.

== Legacy ==
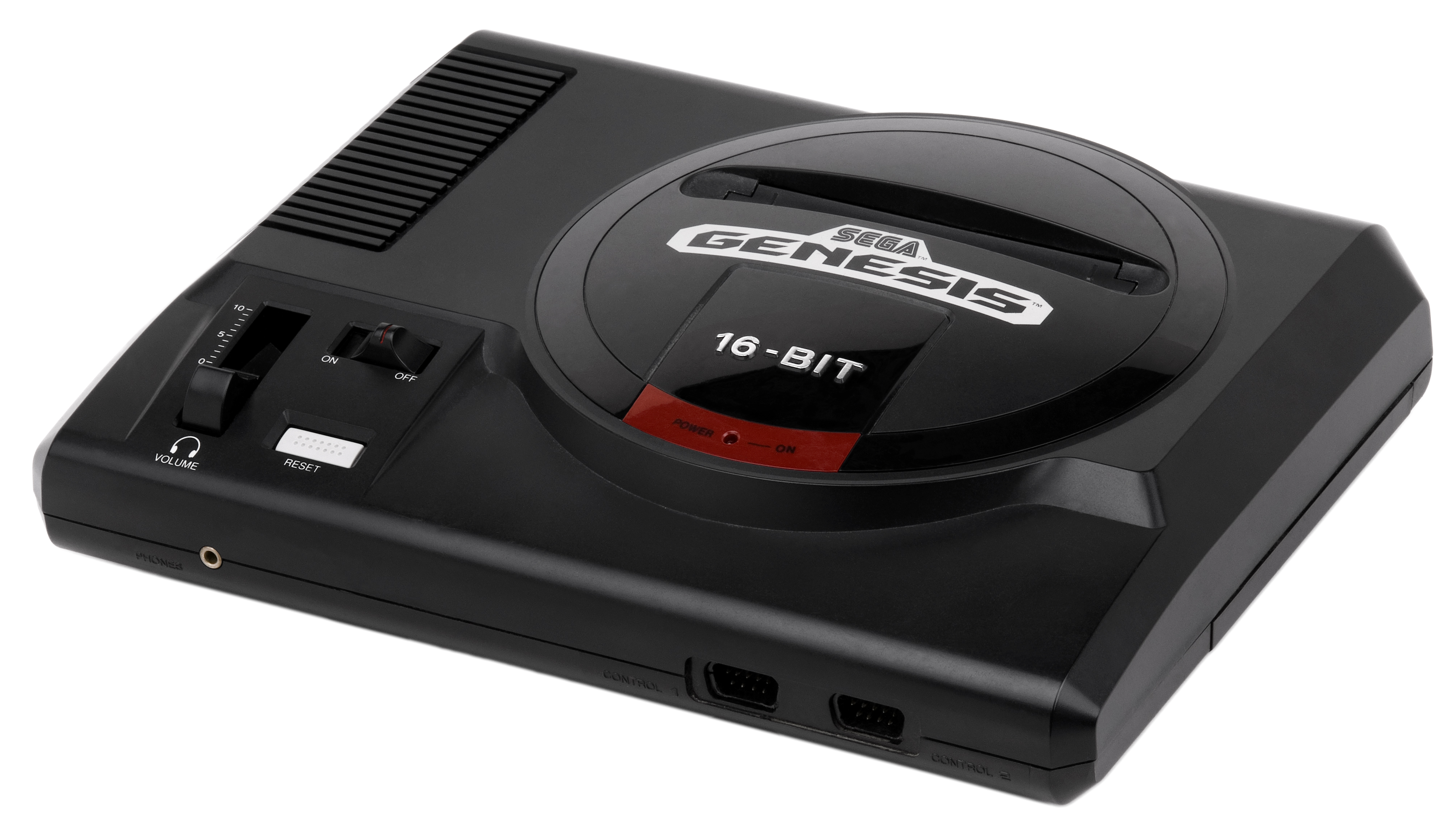
A similar case was decided a month later, when Accolade successfully invoked fair use while reverse engineering the Sega Genesis (pictured above).

The case was decided one month before Sega v. Accolade, another video game case about reverse engineering. The Hastings Communications and Entertainment Law Journal compared the Sega and Nintendo cases, as both courts acknowledged that reverse engineering qualified as fair use, but Atari had infringed copyright by using a "purloined" copy of Nintendo's source code. Ernie Smith at Vice Magazine asserted that the courts could have decided Atari v. Nintendo the same way as Sega v. Accolade, and "would have favored Atari Games had the company not, you know, committed fraud." Other legal scholars have highlighted this as the main distinction between the Sega and Nintendo cases.

Writing for the Duke Law Journal, Maureen A. O'Rourke analyzed both reverse engineering cases, arguing that companies may respond by using shrinkwrap agreements to prohibit reverse engineering. Allan M. Soobert of the UIC Law Review reacted by calling for balanced legislation, to protect copyrighted software from piracy and unauthorized copying, while also protecting the right to reverse engineering.

David L. Hayes of the UIC John Marshall Journal of Information Technology & Privacy also reacted that if disassembly was interpreted as copyright infringement, then "copyright law would, in effect, provide the equivalent of a patent monopoly." Intellectual property lawyer S. Gregory Boyd notes that copyright has a longer duration than patent protection, limiting all rivals who might copy their technology for the next century. Susan Dallas of the Denver Law Review argued that patent protection would be too expensive for most software developers, and that the Atari case narrowed copyright protection by saying that reverse engineering could hypothetically be fair use, in obiter dicta. Meanwhile, Mark L. Gordon of the Journal of Computer and Information Law reacted that the narrowing copyright protection would "lessen the tension between copyright exclusivity and antitrust policy", and "promote growth in the computer technology field".

Multiple legal scholars have criticized the 2000 Digital Millennium Copyright Act (DMCA) for upsetting the balance struck in the Atari and Accolade cases. In the Journal on Telecommunications and High Technology Law, Joe Linhoff criticized the DMCA for including anti-circumvention rules that make it impossible for competitors to create alternative compatible platforms. Craig Zieminski of the Journal of Technology Law & Policy also criticized the DMCA, arguing that "the unprecedented shifts in copyright doctrine – idea protection, ancillary market protection, and contract law's usurpation of copyright law – are warning signs" that the right to reverse engineering is being curtailed.
