= Tengen (company) =

American video game publisher and developer

Tengen Inc.
- Type: Subsidiary
- Industry: Video games
- Founded: December 21, 1987
- Defunct: June 28, 1994
- Fate: Folded into Time Warner Interactive
- Successor: Time Warner Interactive
- Headquarters: Milpitas, California, US
- Products: Video games
- Parent: Atari Games
- Subsidiaries: Tengen Ltd.

Tengen Inc. was an American video game publisher and developer that was created by the arcade game manufacturer Atari Games for publishing computer and console games. It had a Japanese subsidiary named Tengen Ltd. (株式会社テンゲン, Kabushiki-gaisha Tengen).

== History ==
By 1984, Atari, Inc. had been split into two distinct companies. Atari Corporation was responsible for computer and console games and hardware and owned the rights to the Atari brand for these domains. Atari Games was formed from Atari, Inc.'s arcade division, and were able to use the Atari name on arcade releases but not on console or computer games. When Atari Games wanted to enter the console game market, it needed to create a new label that did not use the Atari name. The new subsidiary was dubbed Tengen, which in the Japanese nomenclature of the board game Go refers to the central point of the board (the word "Atari" comes from the same game).

At the time, Nintendo restricted their licensees to releasing only five games per year, mandated that Nintendo handle cartridge manufacturing, and required their games to be NES-exclusive for two years. Atari Games tried to negotiate for a less restrictive license to produce games for the Nintendo Entertainment System; Nintendo refused, so in December 1987, Atari Games agreed to Nintendo's standard licensing terms. Tengen was incorporated on December 21 of that year. In 1988, Tengen released its first and only three games licensed by Nintendo: R.B.I. Baseball, Pac-Man, and Gauntlet.

Meanwhile, Tengen secretly worked to bypass Nintendo's lock-out chip called 10NES that prevented unlicensed NES games from running. While numerous manufacturers managed to override this chip by zapping it with a voltage spike, Tengen engineers feared this could potentially damage NES consoles and expose them to unnecessary liability, and so they started development on a chip they called Rabbit. The other problem was that Nintendo made frequent modifications to the NES to prevent this technique from working. Instead, Tengen chose to reverse engineer the chip and decipher the code required to unlock it. However, the engineers were unable to do so, and the launch date for its first batch of games was rapidly approaching.

With time running short, Tengen turned to the United States Copyright Office. Its lawyers contacted the government office to request a copy of the Nintendo lock-out program, claiming that the company needed it for potential litigation against Nintendo. Once obtained, it used the program to create its own chip that would unlock the NES. Tengen announced that it was going to release its own cartridges in December 1988. When Tengen launched the unlicensed versions of its games, Nintendo immediately sued Tengen for copyright and patent infringement. This began a series of lawsuits between the companies which would not be settled until 1994.

Tengen faced another court challenge with Nintendo in 1989 in copyright controversy over the two companies' NES versions of Tetris. Tengen lost this suit as well, and was forced to recall what was estimated to be hundreds and thousands of unsold cartridges of its version of Tetris (having sold only about 50,000 copies).

Tengen went on to produce games for other systems, including the Sega Genesis, Master System, Game Gear, and TurboGrafx-16, and a few more, as well as publish a localized Sega CD title. The company also licensed games for home computers such as the Amiga and the Atari ST, most of which were published by British company Domark. It was best known for its ports of popular Atari arcade games, including Klax, Hard Drivin', STUN Runner, and Paperboy, although it published many other titles as well. In 1994, with the lawsuit against Nintendo settled, and after Time Warner re-acquired a controlling stake in Atari Games, Tengen was consolidated into Time Warner Interactive.

=== Revival ===
In 2024, homebrew developer Jeff Silvers acquired the "Tengen" trademark to launch a new company called Tengen Games. The company's first game was Zed and Zee, an 8-bit arcade-style action platformer for NES, Famicom, and Windows.

== NES games ==
Tengen manufactured both licensed and unlicensed versions of three of their NES games (R.B.I. Baseball, Gauntlet, and Pac-Man). The cartridges for their unlicensed games did not come in the gray, semi-square shape that licensed NES games came in; instead, they are rounded and matte-black, and resemble the original Atari cartridges.

Licensed and unlicensed

- R.B.I. Baseball (released June 1988; reskinned version of Pro Yakyū Family Stadium by Namco)
- Gauntlet (released July 1988)
- Pac-Man (released October 1988; based on Namco's 1984 Famicom port)

Unlicensed only

Following games were released unlicensed by Tengen, unless otherwise noted some of these games were released licensed by other publishers.

- Tetris: The Soviet Mind Game (released May 1989)
- Super Sprint (released July 1989; licensed version released in Japan by Altron)
- Rolling Thunder (released October 1989; released as a licensed game by Namco in Japan)
- Road Runner (released November 1989)
- Vindicators (released November 1989)
- After Burner (released December 1989; not related to the version released by Sunsoft in Japan which was titled After Burner II)
- Alien Syndrome (released December 1989; released as a licensed game by Sunsoft in Japan)
- Shinobi (released December 1989)
- Toobin' (released December 1989)
- Fantasy Zone (not related to the version released by Sunsoft in Japan)
- Indiana Jones and the Temple of Doom (released late 1989; a licensed version was published by Mindscape)
- Klax (released as a licensed game by Hudson Soft in Japan)
- Ms. Pac-Man (an original port released in 1990; unrelated to Namco's 1993 port)
- Pac-Mania (developed by Westwood Associates)
- R.B.I. Baseball 2
- R.B.I. Baseball 3
- Skull & Crossbones

== See also ==
- Atari
