= R.B.I. Baseball 3 =

1991 video game

- Developer: Tengen
- Publisher: Tengen
- Programmers: Michael Alexander; Mark Phoenix; Doug Coward
- Series: R.B.I. Baseball
- Platforms: Genesis, NES
- Release: Nintendo Entertainment System: NA: 1991; Sega Genesis: NA: October 1991
- Genres: Sports (baseball)
- Modes: Single-player, multiplayer

R.B.I. Baseball 3 is the second sequel to the R.B.I. Baseball video game. It was published by Tengen for the Genesis and Nintendo Entertainment System in 1991.

== Gameplay ==
The gameplay is similar to the original R.B.I. game, with a few differences. For one thing the players are skinnier. As well, players are able to jump and dive, abilities which were not available in the original.

R.B.I. 3 also has every major league team available from the 1990 season, as well as postseason teams from 1983-1989.

A regular season feature was available for R.B.I. 3. Players could choose one team to compete against every other team. All star teams and postseason teams were eligible for this season mode. Passwords were given after each game to help players complete schedules. Once all teams had been defeated, the player had to compete against a fictional all star team from Japan, which included players with incredible HR and AVE stats and pitchers that could not be hit.

== Reception ==
R.B.I. Baseball III was listed in the 1991 Games 100 in Games, saying that the R.B.I. series using real-life players and up-to-date stats makes it "far more appealing than other video baseball cartridges" noting that the games are "excellently programmed action contests, with easy-to-grasp pitching, batting, and fielding mechanics".

Mega Play Magazine said that the ability to pick your team and line-up order made it so that this game "answered the demands of baseball players everywhere".

Bill Schultz of Digital Press - Classic Video Games complained that "poor graphics and gameplay" keep this game from being great, and recommended it only to die-hard fans.

Alex Burr of Sega-16.com called the game "forgettable" and "blasé" with its "lackluster scoreboard" and "fairly shaky" graphics.
