= MLB Advanced Media =

Limited partnership of the club owners of Major League Baseball (MLB)

MLB Advanced Media, L.P.
- Type: Private
- Industry: Internet media
- Founded: June 2000; 26 years ago
- Headquarters: New York City
- Products: MLB.com, MiLB.com, MLB.TV, Gameday Audio, R.B.I. Baseball, MLB: The Show (Non PlayStation versions)
- Revenue: $300 million (2006), $620 million (2012)
- Owner: Major League Baseball member club owners
- Subsidiaries: Stadium (JV); Tickets.com

MLB Advanced Media, L.P. (MLBAM) is a limited partnership of the club owners of Major League Baseball (MLB) based in New York City and is the Internet and interactive branch of the league.

Robert Bowman, former president and CEO, said in May 2012 that MLBAM generates around $620 million a year in revenue. Forbes called the company "the Biggest Media Company You've Never Heard Of".

The company operates the official web site for the league and the thirty Major League Baseball club web sites via MLB.com, which draws four million hits per day. The site offers news, standings, statistics, and schedules, while subscribers have access to live audio and video broadcasts of most games. The company also employs reporters, with one assigned to each team for the season and others serving more general beats. MLB Advanced Media also owns and operates BaseballChannel.tv and MLB Radio.

MLBAM also runs and/or owns the official web sites of the National Hockey League and Minor League Baseball, YES Network (the television broadcaster of the New York Yankees), SportsNet New York (the television broadcaster of the New York Mets). It has also provided the backend infrastructure for WWE Network, WatchESPN, ESPN3, HBO Now, and PGA Tour Live.

== History ==
Major League Baseball Advanced Media was formed in 2000 by Baseball Commissioner Bud Selig to consolidate online rights and ticket sales for Major League Baseball teams. MLBAM was to be capitalized with $120 million with $1 million per team contributed each year for four years. The company hired an outside consulting firm to build its websites which failed to work properly, which led them to develop their own tech. In 2002, MLBAM attempted to run a streaming package around Japanese player Ichiro Suzuki of the Mariners, which achieved little success. With these failures, MLB Advance Media used its ticket rights to get an advance from Ticketmaster in mid 2002.

MLBAM used its $10 million advance from Ticketmaster to meet payroll and make another run at video. A Texas Rangers - New York Yankees game was produced and broadcast online on August 26, 2002. The company continued to tweak online broadcasting. A nine-game pennant race package was sold two weeks later followed by a $19.95 postseason package. Concurrently with 2003 spring training, MLB.tv was launched at $79.95 for a full season package, which garnered 100,000 subscribers. Those revenues halted the need for additional capital from the teams, taking only $77 million of the original planned $120 million.

In 2005, MLBAM bought ticket sales company Tickets.com in a deal worth approximately $66 million. MLBAM indicated at the time that the move was spurred by increased attendance at both the major and minor league levels of the sport and the need to make ticket purchases convenient for fans. In 2007, MLBAM signed a five-year deal with StubHub.

In April 2008, MLBAM signed a three-year deal with Yahoo for ad sales. The company replaced Yahoo with Auditude in a multi-year deal in April 2011.

In 2011, MLBAM worked with Glenn Beck to stream his new media services GBTV.

On February 20, 2014, Sports Illustrated announced the formation of 120 Sports, a streaming sports video service, with financial backing from MLBAM, the NHL, and Silver Chalice. Four days later, WWE launched its streaming platform WWE Network, with MLBAM as its operating partner.

In 2014, 2K announced that it would not exercise its license to publish a 2015 MLB video game for the Xbox. Thus, MLBAM developed a game from scratch in one and a half years with only a dozen programmers. The game, R.B.I. Baseball 14, was poorly received by the critics.

In February 2015, it was reported that MLBAM was planning to spin off its streaming technology division as an independent company, with investments by MLB and other minority partners. MLB-specific properties (such as MLB.com) would remain under league control. The formation of the spin-out, known as BAMTech, was approved by the company's board of directors on August 13, 2015.

On August 4, 2015, the National Hockey League announced a six-year deal with MLBAM for it to take over its digital properties, including its websites, mobile apps, operations and distribution of its digital streaming service NHL GameCenter Live (renamed NHL.tv outside of Canada), and migrating NHL Network to the facilities of MLB Network. The deal is worth $600 million over the life of the contract, and also granted the NHL an equity stake of up to 10% in BAMTech.

As of January 2018, MLBAM has a video game development team of 30+ employees who are working on R.B.I Baseball 18, the R.B.I. Baseball franchise was revived by MLBAM in 2014. With R.B.I Baseball 14, 15, 16, and 17, MLBAM had outsourced development to several external development studios and had a small group dedicated to overseeing production and managing publishing duties, that had all changed with R.B.I Baseball 18 when MLBAM decided to move development in-house. R.B.I Baseball is a unique product due to the fact that this is "the only instance of a professional sports league producing its own console video game," MLBAM is now a video game developer, producer and publisher as a result.

In 2017, the company's chief executive, Robert Bowman, was forced out after allegations related to his workplace conduct.

== MLB At Bat ==
MLBAM is responsible for the At Bat app for the iPhone and iPad, which is downloadable from the iTunes store and also available as an Android app on Google Play.

In April 2012, MLBAM announced that the MLB.com At Bat 12 application surpassed the three million download mark, achieving the milestone only eight days into the 2012 MLB regular season and more than four months earlier than its record-setting 2011 campaign.

MLBAM CEO Robert Bowman had this to say about MLBAM in an article entitled "What did you learn in 2012 that you will carry forth with you into 2013?":

The toughest thing to do in a poker hand and in this business is stand pat. This year we decided to make our At Bat app universal between the iPad and iPhone, which we knew going in would cost us 100,000 subscribers. We threw in At Bat for free with an MLB.tv subscription, which would also cost us revenue. And we added up a monthly At Bat subscription to get people to test the product out. We gave customers more options and a better deal, and we had a record year in paid content. We learned we're at an inflection point. Customers now understand and appreciate the nuance of content economics. You'll see more of that value pricing from us going forward.

== Intellectual property ==
=== MLBAM vs. CDM ===
MLBAM signed a five-year, $50 million interactive rights deal with the MLB Players Association in 2005 to acquire most of the players' online rights, including fantasy sports. The deal exacerbated tension between fantasy sports companies and professional leagues and players associations over the rights to player profiles and statistics. The players associations of the major sports leagues believed that fantasy games using player names were subject to licensing due to the right of publicity of the players involved. During the 1980s and 1990s many companies signed licensing deals with the player associations, but many companies did not. The issue came to a head when MLBAM denied a fantasy baseball licensing agreement to St. Louis-based CBC Distribution and Marketing Inc., the parent company of CDM Sports. CBC filed suit as a result. CBC argued that intellectual property laws and so-called "right of publicity" laws don't apply to the statistics used in fantasy sports. The FSTA filed a friend of the court brief in support of CBC which argued that MLBAM's step to deny CBC a license was the first step to limit the number of companies in the market, that could result in MLBAM having a monopoly. CBC won the lawsuit as U.S. District Court Judge Mary Ann Medler ruled that statistics are part of the public domain and can be used at no cost by fantasy companies. "The names and playing records of major-league baseball players as used in CBC's fantasy games are not copyrightable," Medler wrote. "Therefore, federal copyright law does not pre-empt the players' claimed right of publicity." The 8th Circuit Court of Appeals upheld the decision in October 2007. "It would be a strange law that a person would not have a First Amendment right to use information that is available to everyone," a three-judge panel said in its ruling.

On June 2, 2008, the United States Supreme Court denied MLB's petition for a writ of certiorari.

MLBAM has lost nearly $2 million on the case and may now opt out of the agreement with the MLBPA and also faces the potential loss of millions of dollars of licensing fees from major media companies, such as Fox. ESPN opted out of a seven-year, $140 million deal with MLBAM after three years in January 2008. The decision to opt out came less than three months after the CDM case was upheld on appeal as "ESPN thinks the court's decision means that it was paying a license fee for fantasy rights that others, such as CDM, were getting free."

=== MLBAM patents and patent infringement issues ===
MLBAM has been issued some patents with others still "patent pending" before the U.S. Patent & Trademark Office. For example, MLBAM was awarded U.S. Patent No. 7,486,943 for geolocating and blocking fans from viewing local games online. In addition, MLBAM was issued a patent for a system and method for allocating seats for a ticketed event. Another example of an MLBAM patent is U.S. Patent No. 8,045,965 entitled "System and method for venue-to-venue messaging," which lists MLBAM CEO Robert A. Bowman as a co-inventor (inventorship).

MLBAM has been the subject of patent infringement lawsuits. See, for example, DDB Techs., L.L.C. v. MLB Advanced Media, L.P. This case began as a patent infringement suit between DDB Technologies (DDB) and MLBAM over several patents for generating a computer simulation of a live event for display on a viewer's computer as well as one patent for a method allowing a viewer to search for certain information about a live event. The technology at issue was being used for simulation of baseball and other sporting activities. The case was finally settled with MLBAM acquiring rights to the DDB patent portfolio.

MLBAM has also been sued for patent infringement of the Front Row Technologies patent portfolio covering the delivery of sports and entertainment video to hand held devices such as smartphones (e.g., iPhone, Android), pad computing devices (e.g., iPad, Kindle, etc.), laptop computers and the like. According to the patent infringement complaint filed in the United States District Court for the Northern District of Texas, MLBAM infringed U.S. Patent Number 8,090,321 entitled "Transmitting sports and entertainment data to wireless hand held devices over a telecommunications network."

== See also ==
- Statcast
