= American Sports Network =

Sports brand owned by Sinclair Broadcast Group

- Type: Ad hoc television network/syndication service
- Country: United States
- Broadcast area: Regional (available on television stations in several markets, as well as select regional sports networks)
- Affiliates: List of affiliates
- Headquarters: West Palm Beach, Florida

Ownership
- Owner: Sinclair Broadcast Group
- Parent: Sinclair Networks LLC
- Key people: Doron Gorshein (COO, Sinclair Networks)

History
- Founded: July 17, 2014
- Launched: August 30, 2014
- Closed: August 21, 2017 (2 years, 356 days)
- Replaced by: Stadium

Links
- Website: americansportsnet.com

American Sports Network (ASN) was a sports brand owned by the Sinclair Broadcast Group through its Sinclair Networks subsidiary. Formed in July 2014, the multicast network component of ASN produced broadcasts of sporting events that were aired primarily across stations owned by Sinclair (in particular, The CW and MyNetworkTV stations owned and/or operated by the company, or, in some markets, on a digital subchannel of a Sinclair station), and syndicated to non-Sinclair stations and regional sports networks.

The multicast network component of ASN primarily dealt in college sports from NCAA Division I conferences, including live football and basketball games from the Atlantic 10 Conference, Big South Conference, Colonial Athletic Association, Conference USA, Horizon League, Ivy League, Mid-American Conference, Ohio Valley Conference, Patriot League, Southern Conference, Southland Conference, and Western Athletic Conference, as well as a limited number of professional sports events. In 2015, ASN acquired regional rights to Real Salt Lake and D.C. United of Major League Soccer, with games aired on Sinclair stations in the teams' market area, as well as television rights to the newly established Arizona Bowl.

In 2017, Sinclair announced that it would fold the multicast network component of ASN into a new joint venture with Silver Chalice called Stadium, which would combine ASN's broadcast distribution platforms with content from Silver Chalice's digital outlets 120 Sports and Campus Insiders. ASN-branded multicast programming continued on-air until September 6, when the network formally transitioned on-air to Stadium.

== History ==
Sinclair Broadcast Group formally announced the launch of the American Sports Network on July 17, 2014; the service was led by Doron Gorshein, who joined the company in January 2014 in the role of chief operating officer of Sinclair Networks. ASN carried live broadcasts of mainly collegiate sporting events, along with ancillary programming focusing on colleges, their students and student-athletes. ASN's content aired primarily on Sinclair-owned-or-operated affiliates of The CW and MyNetworkTV or on secondary digital subchannels of other stations run by the company (some of which had carried content from competing syndicated sports distributors ESPN Regional Television and Raycom Sports until ASN's launch), the latter especially the case for its stations that have primary affiliations with one of the Big Four networks (ABC, NBC, CBS and Fox) which would not pre-empt the higher-tier sports coverage provided by their network partners. Sinclair opened ASN up for distribution by other broadcast outlets interested in carrying the service's content, and announced plans to expand ASN onto digital platforms.

ASN planned to initially broadcast college football, men's and women's college basketball, women's college soccer, and college baseball events, beginning with the 2014 NCAA Division I FBS and FCS football seasons. Prior to the service's formal launch, Sinclair reached broadcast rights agreements with five NCAA Division I conferences, including Conference USA, the Colonial Athletic Association, Big South Conference, Southern Conference, and the Patriot League.

ASN's first broadcasts took place on August 30, 2014, featuring two football games involving Conference USA teams (Old Dominion University vs. Hampton University and Florida International University hosting Bethune-Cookman University).

In September 2014, Sinclair reached a two-year deal with the International Motor Sports Association to syndicate broadcasts of the Porsche GT3 Cup Challenge series through ASN beginning that year, with a renewal option that could be exercised in 2016. Its first race broadcast on September 13, 2014, was shown on Sinclair stations in at least 36 markets, marking the first non-college sporting event to be syndicated by ASN.

On September 29, 2014, Sinclair announced a multi-year deal with the Western Athletic Conference to broadcast its games through ASN – marking the sixth conference to partner with the service. Sinclair also announced that it had reached syndication deals with stations in 67 markets where the company does not have a station in its portfolio to carry ASN's programming, expanding its total potential audience to 83 million viewers.

On October 16, 2014, Jonathan B. LeCrone announced the Horizon League had entered into a deal with the American Sports Network to broadcast select games; subsequently on November 10, ASN entered into a broadcast contract with the Ohio Valley Conference.

On December 2, 2014, ASN entered into the collegiate ice hockey field through an agreement that gave it the rights to air six Penn State Nittany Lions home games. ASN later added two other men's ice hockey contests from the Big Ten Conference, featuring the Wisconsin Badgers and Ohio State Buckeyes.

On January 23, 2015, Sinclair announced that it had acquired regional television rights to Real Salt Lake of Major League Soccer beginning in the 2015 season, with ASN handling production of the telecasts. KMYU and KUTV aired the games locally, and they were syndicated to Sinclair stations in Las Vegas and Reno, Nevada as well as in Boise, Idaho. Stations in Arizona and New Mexico were able to bid for the local rights to telecast the matches in their markets.

On May 19, 2015, ASN announced that it had reached an agreement with Minor League Baseball (MiLB) to televise a weekly game during the 2015 season. ASN aired a weekly game live from different individual leagues on Sunday nights, and also aired the all-star games for the Florida State League and the Midwest League.

On June 24, 2015, the Southland Conference announced that ASN would televise select matches from their conference beginning with the 2015 fall football season. The ASN package replaced the Southland Conference TV Network syndication package.

In September 2015, ASN reached a deal with the Mid-American Conference, sub-licensed through ESPN, to broadcast selected games. In the 2015–16 academic season, ASN was scheduled to broadcast 10 football games, 10 men's basketball games, and 5 women's basketball games. ASN also reached deals with the NCAA Division I ice hockey conferences, including the Big Ten, ECAC Hockey, Hockey East, National Collegiate Hockey Conference, and the Western Collegiate Hockey Association, to broadcast games as part of a Friday night package.

In November 2015, it was announced that ASN had acquired broadcast rights to the inaugural Arizona Bowl.

On December 18, 2015, D.C. United of Major League Soccer announced that Sinclair had acquired rights to the team. ASN-produced coverage was aired by News Channel 8 and WJLA-TV. Matches were also syndicated to digital subchannels of WUTB Baltimore, WRLH Richmond, WTVZ Norfolk, and WSET Roanoke.

On January 8, 2016, Sinclair announced a dedicated American Sports Network channel, offered as an affiliation for digital subchannels of stations in Baltimore, Charleston, Cincinnati, Columbus, Greensboro, Myrtle Beach, Nashville, Pittsburgh, Portland, and Raleigh-Durham. The service launched on January 11, 2016.

=== 2017: Relaunch as Stadium ===
On April 13, 2017, Sinclair officially announced that the multicast network component of ASN would be re-launched later in the year as part of a joint venture with Silver Chalice (owner of Campus Insiders) and its online sports video service 120 Sports, later revealed to be Stadium. The service was set to target both broadcast and digital platforms, with the linear service utilizing the syndication and broadcast network built out for ASN, and 120 Sports providing original studio and long-form programming to the venture. On June 1, 2017, it was reported that Stadium would officially launch around late-July 2017. After a soft launch in July 2017, the service officially launched on August 21, with ASN's over-the-air network formally joining Stadium on September 6.

Stadium's studio programming is produced from Chicago; Sinclair's West Palm Beach CBS affiliate WPEC-TV shared facilities with ASN, and retained the set as a secondary studio, using it for its newscasts while its main studio was being renovated, and originating Sinclair sister station WGFL's newscasts until 2023.

== Programming ==
- A-10 Spotlight
- C-USA Showcase
- Porsche GT3 Cup Challenge
- Real Salt Lake soccer: Announcers include David James & Brian Dunseth
- Minor League Baseball Sunday Showcase: Announcers for the games included former Major League Baseball players Brian McRae, Keith Moreland and Dave Armstrong.
- The Dance League on ASN (syndicated) with Millennium Dancesport
- local high school sports
  - Thursday Night Lights
  - Friday Night Rivals
- AMA Pro Flat Track Motorcycle Racing (syndicated) AMA Pro Racing
- D.C. United soccer
- ARCA Racing Series (9 races for 2016, 5 of them were aired live)
- All Star Sprint Cars (6 tape-delayed races for 2016)
- ROH Rewind professional wrestling

=== NCAA sports ===
==== 2014–15 ====
During the 2014–15 season, ASN televised live events from the following NCAA Division I conferences:

League	Football	Men's basketball	Women's basketball	Men's ice hockey	Men's soccer	Women's soccer	Baseball	Softball	Women's volleyball	Men's lacrosse	Women's lacrosse
Atlantic 10 Conference		Yes	Yes								
Big South Conference	Yes	Yes	Yes				Yes	Yes			
Big Ten Conference				Yes							
Colonial Athletic Association	Yes	Yes	Yes		Yes	Yes	Yes	Yes	Yes	Yes	Yes
Conference USA	Yes	Yes	Yes				Yes				
Horizon League		Yes									
Ivy League		Yes	Yes								Yes
Ohio Valley Conference		Yes									
Patriot League	Yes	Yes	Yes		Yes	Yes				Yes	Yes
Southern Conference	Yes	Yes					Yes	Yes		Yes	
Western Athletic Conference		Yes	Yes								

==== 2015–16 ====
During the 2015–16 season, ASN televised live events from the following NCAA Division I conferences:

League	Football	Men's basketball	Women's basketball	Men's ice hockey	Women's ice hockey	Men's soccer	Women's soccer	Baseball	Softball	Women's volleyball	Men's lacrosse	Women's lacrosse
American Athletic Conference		Yes										
Atlantic 10 Conference		Yes	Yes			Yes	Yes	Yes	Yes	Yes		
Big South Conference	Yes	Yes	Yes									
Big Ten Conference				Yes								
Colonial Athletic Association	Yes	Yes	Yes			Yes	Yes	Yes	Yes	Yes	Yes	Yes
Conference USA	Yes	Yes	Yes					Yes	Yes			
ECAC Hockey				Yes								
Hockey East				Yes	Yes							
Horizon League		Yes										
Ivy League	Yes	Yes	Yes									Yes
Mid-American Conference	Yes	Yes	Yes									
National Collegiate Hockey Conference				Yes								
Ohio Valley Conference	Yes	Yes	Yes									
Patriot League	Yes	Yes	Yes			Yes	Yes				Yes	Yes
Southern Conference	Yes	Yes							Yes			
Southland Conference	Yes	Yes										
Western Athletic Conference		Yes	Yes					Yes				
Western Collegiate Hockey Association				Yes								

ASN also acquired the D2 Game of the Week rights and televised NCAA Division II football and men's and women's basketball on their network during 2015–16. The D2 package was formerly on CBS Sports Network. ASN also acquired the rights to air the Arizona Bowl college football bowl game.

==== 2016–17 ====
During the 2016-17 season, ASN televised live events from the following NCAA Division I conferences:

League	Football	Men's basketball	Women's basketball	Men's ice hockey	Women's ice hockey	Men's soccer	Women's soccer	Women's volleyball	Baseball	Softball	Men's lacrosse	Women's lacrosse	Beach volleyball
American Athletic Conference		Yes											
Atlantic Hockey				Yes									
ASUN Conference												Yes	Yes
Atlantic 10 Conference		Yes	Yes			Yes	Yes	Yes		Yes			
Big South Conference	Yes	Yes	Yes						Yes	Yes			
Big Ten Conference				Yes									
Colonial Athletic Association	Yes	Yes	Yes			Yes	Yes	Yes			Yes	Yes	
Conference USA	Yes	Yes	Yes										
ECAC Hockey				Yes									
Hockey East				Yes	Yes								
Horizon League		Yes											
Ivy League	Yes	Yes	Yes									Yes	
Mid-American Conference	Yes	Yes	Yes										
National Collegiate Hockey Conference				Yes									
Ohio Valley Conference		Yes	Yes										
Patriot League	Yes	Yes	Yes			Yes	Yes				Yes	Yes	
Southern Conference	Yes	Yes							Yes	Yes	Yes		
Southland Conference	Yes	Yes											
Sunbelt Conference	Yes	Yes											
Western Athletic Conference		Yes							Yes				
Western Collegiate Hockey Association				Yes									

In addition to the above conferences, ASN acquired the rights to University of Massachusetts Minutemen football games for the 2016 season, and retained the rights to air the Arizona Bowl college football bowl game. ASN also had the rights to the D2 Game of the Week and televised NCAA Division II football and men's and women's basketball on their network during 2016-17.

== Affiliates ==
American Sports Network telecasts were aired primarily on stations owned or managed by Sinclair Broadcast Group; this included stations operated by the firm under local marketing agreements or similar pacts, which itself included stations owned by companies such as Cunningham Broadcasting, Deerfield Media, and Howard Stirk Holdings among others. These telecasts were not always scheduled to appear on a station's main digital subchannel nor on a fixed single station where Sinclair owned and/or managed more than one station. In addition to the Sinclair stations, ASN's events (and Stadium after that), were also syndicated to other broadcasters.

=== Regional sports networks ===
- Altitude Sports and Entertainment
- Comcast SportsNet Chicago
- Comcast SportsNet Mid-Atlantic
- Comcast SportsNet Philadelphia
- Cox Sports Television
- Mid-Atlantic Sports Network
- NBC Sports Bay Area
- New England Sports Network
- Root Sports Southwest
- Spectrum Sports (Texas)
- YurView California
- American Forces Network

== See also ==
- ESPN Regional Television, a similar operation previously run by ESPN
- Raycom Sports, a similar operation run by Raycom Media
- Southland Conference Television Network
- Sports Network

Preceded by ESPN Plus	Syndication Rights Holder to Conference USA football and men's basketball 2014–2017	Succeeded by Stadium
