= R.B.I. Baseball '95 =

1995 video game

RBI Baseball '95
- Developer: Time Warner Interactive
- Publisher: Time Warner Interactive
- Director: Bill Hindorff
- Producer: Richard Seaborne
- Designers: Mike Klug; Jules Marino
- Programmers: Mike Alexander; Doug Coward; Doug Nonast; Richard Seaborne; Charles Tolman; May Yam
- Artists: Jennifer Case; Valerie Couderc; Jose Erazo; Lindsay Dawson; Doug Gray; Jules Marino
- Composers: Doug Brandon; Earl Vickers
- Series: R.B.I. Baseball
- Platform: 32X
- Release: 1995
- Genre: Sports
- Modes: Single-player, multiplayer

R.B.I. Baseball '95 is a baseball video game developed and published by Time Warner Interactive exclusively for the 32X in North America in 1995. It is the last game in the R.B.I. Baseball series to be released on a Sega platform, and follows RBI Baseball '94.

RBI Baseball '95's history is curious as it was originally announced at CES 1995 for the Sega CD, as well as the 32X, priced in the US at $49.95 and $54.95 USD respectively. For some reason, the game instead moved onto a cartridge, effectively becoming a 32X exclusive, and its price at launch was upped to $59.95.

R.B.I. Baseball '95 was the first baseball game for the 32X.

== Gameplay and updates ==
RBI Baseball '95 plays differently from its Genesis/Mega Drive predecessors in one very noticeable form: Unlike any of the prior entries going up to '94, all of which had the player delivering pitches and hitting the ball from a view above and behind the umpire (with windows in the upper corners to show runners at first and third base), all instances of this now take place from the catcher's point of view, aimed to deliver a more "up close and personal" sense of realistic experience while making use of the Super 32X's software rendering and sprite scaling capabilities. When the ball has been hit, the familiar gameplay of the franchise returns, with the player and computer guiding the runners and defense across the baseball field to either get an out or score a run; as with traditional baseball, the game ends when a team has a higher score than their opponent at the end of the ninth or relevant extra inning.

Returning for '95, in regards to extra modes, are the ability to play Home Run Derby, tour each stadium in an overhead view, look at the statistics of every team's players, play the traditional Game Breakers that have been present from RBI Baseball IV to '94, attempt to successfully master twenty different defense tactics in the Defense Practice minigame, and create teams; not returning for this game is Pickles, a minigame exclusive to '94 that required the player to use the defense to get out one or multiple runners in a single play, which like Home Run Derby and Defense Practice, gives the player twenty different scenarios per session.

For the first time since RBI Baseball IV in 1992, virtually all of the sprites of the players, umpires, field, and ball (among others) have been completely redrawn, making use of the higher palette of the Super 32X and increasing their sprite count for increased fluidity; this also would apply to the Scoreboard shown in between the start and halfway point of each inning. Some sprites and virtually every vocal cue by sportscaster Jack Buck from '94 are recycled for this game, though this came at a cost: due to possible technical limitations, and likely also the game's shorter development time, all of the short animated movies from RBI Baseball IV to '94 that would play in the first and third base windows throughout the game (such as fans doing the wave, a player having a close slide at a base, the spitball, the Basebrawl during a hit by pitch, and the coach delivering signs, among many others) had to be downsized in sprite dimensions and put in Grayscale; the Crazyball feature that was made popular in '94, which would replace all of the normal sound effects of the game with stock cartoon and gag sound cues, was also removed.

As how it has been with every entry since the Genesis/Mega Drive version of RBI Baseball III, the Password system that '95 uses has unique codes that allows access to an Animation Test/Sprite Viewer, find hidden messages placed within the game's code by the developers, and the ability to play as the Warner Corporate and Dream Team for an extra difficult challenge (with Warner Corporate replacing Team Tengen, which was present from III to '94).

== Reception ==
Reception

Review scores
Publication	Score
Electronic Gaming Monthly	11.5/20
Game Informer	6/10
Game Players	77%
GameFan	70/100
GamePro	4.25/5
NGamer	2/5
Flux	B−
VideoGames	6/10

Next Generation reviewed the game, rating it two stars out of five, and wrote that "RBI '95 is not the worst baseball game, but for the first 32-bit baseball game, it makes no strides forward. Disappointing".
