= 120 Sports =

Internet television service

120 Sports was an internet television service, operated as a joint venture between Time Inc., Silver Chalice, MLB Advanced Media, and the National Hockey League. The service produced and streamed sports news and highlight content catered towards digital platforms and a young adult audience

== History ==
120 Sports was announced on February 20, 2014, by Time Inc. as a branch of its magazine Sports Illustrated, with financial backing by MLB Advanced Media, the National Hockey League, and Silver Chalice. Initially, the service focused on streaming sports news and highlights, particularly from its partners as well as the NBA and NASCAR. The name of the service came from its original concept, as these videos would be only two minutes long.

On June 25, 2014, 120Sports launched a daily schedule of live studio programming; president Jason Coyle stated that the service wanted to "create a daily habit, where you'll check us multiple times a day and have as long a viewing session as possible". The service was designed to appeal to millennials. To avoid succumbing to regional bias, the network hired reporters from across the country; executive vice president Matt Carstens stated 120 Sports "wanted to have a work base that is diverse in every way — diverse in the sports they follow, diverse in the teams they follow — to prevent any sort of bias". A morning show, 120 Morning Run, was launched on July 2, 2014. It is hosted by Chicago sports talk veterans Laurence Holmes and Dylan McGorty.

On April 13, 2017, it was announced that Silver Chalice had partnered with Sinclair Broadcast Group to merge Campus Insiders, 120 Sports, and Sinclair's syndication service and linear digital television channel American Sports Network into a new multi-platform sports network known as Stadium.
