= R.B.I. Baseball 2 =

1990 video game

- Developer: Tengen
- Publishers: NA: Tengen; EU: Domark Software
- Designer: Mike Klug
- Programmers: Mike Alexander; Bill Hindorff; Lisa Ching
- Artist: Greg Williams
- Composers: Don Diekneite; John Paul; Brad Fuller
- Series: R.B.I. Baseball
- Platforms: NES, Commodore 64, Amiga, Amstrad CPC, Atari ST, MS-DOS, ZX Spectrum
- Release: NES: NA: 1990; Amiga, C64, CPC, MS-DOS, Spectrum: EU: 1991
- Genre: Sports

R.B.I. Baseball 2 is a sports video game released for the Nintendo Entertainment System in 1990 by Tengen. It is the second game in the R.B.I. Baseball series.

== Reception ==
Damon Howarth for Page 6 said: "I enjoyed this game and spent many hours trying to get Bo to beat the Toronto Bluejays".

Brian Nesbitt for The One wrote: "In a nutshell, R.B.I. 2 is one of the finest baseball games yet released (in fact, one of the better sports sims of any type)".

George Hulseman for Current Notes opined that "this game does have a lot of merit. It's as good as Hardball, which has limitations of its own. The game screens are pleasing to the eye. And the challenge is as good as the team you pick. Having real players, whose individual stats play a determining role in the game, is a nice feature".

Dan Slingsby for CU Amiga said: "A refreshing and original game. The best baseball game since Hardball hit the C64 all those years ago".

Sandra Foley for Amiga Computing wrote: "Initially a bit limited for arcade fans, the sports sim element soon takes over and rewards perseverance with an engrossing tactical action game".
