= R.B.I. Baseball 14 =

2014 video game

- Developer: Behaviour Interactive
- Publisher: MLB Advanced Media
- Series: R.B.I. Baseball
- Platforms: iOS, PlayStation 3, Xbox 360, Android, PlayStation 4, Xbox One
- Release: April 9, 2014; Android; May 8, 2014; PS4, Xbox One; June 24, 2014
- Genre: Sports
- Modes: Single-player, multiplayer

R.B.I. Baseball 14 is a 2014 baseball video game developed by Behaviour Interactive and published by MLB Advanced Media. It is the first game in the reboot R.B.I. Baseball series. The game was released for iOS, PlayStation 3, and Xbox One on April 9. Android, PlayStation 4, and Xbox One versions released later that year.

In 2013, MLB acquired the rights to the R.B.I. trademark from another game studio, and hired Behaviour to develop the game. MLB Advanced Media oversaw design, art direction, and production, while Behaviour worked on programming and art. The game received mixed reviews, with praise for the pick up and play gameplay, and criticism for the presentation and the lack of online multiplayer.

== Gameplay ==
Gameplay screenshot of a baseball match

R.B.I. Baseball 14 is a baseball game that includes 30 MLB teams, with 16 players per team. The game can be played in three modes: Exhibition, which can last one nine-inning game, Season, which lasts an entire baseball season, and Post-Season, which lets the player compete in a pennant race. Batting consists of hitting the ball at an angle, or bunting. The batter can freely move around the batter’s box, even while swinging. The pitcher has three pitch types, a toss, a fastball, and a knuckleball.

A ground indicator is used to see a ball's location before catching it. With bases can be stolen when there is opening available. Matches incorporate the mercy rule, ending the game if the player is ahead by more than ten runs by the fifth inning. Leaderboards track how games the players has won. Each team has an extra uniform that can be unlocked by completing a challenge.

== Development ==
After Atari Games's rights to the R.B.I. trademark expired in 1995, the name went unused until 2007, until a studio, Six Degrees Games, registered a trademark for "R.B.I. Baseball". MLB acquired the rights from Six Degrees Games in 2013. MLB Advanced Media hired the Montreal-based studio Behaviour Interactive to develop the game. A six-person team at MLB Advanced Media oversaw design, art direction, and production, while Behaviour Interactive handled programming and art.

MLBAM announced the return of the series with R.B.I. Baseball 14 on January 15, 2014. In March, a tweet from ESPN correspondent Darren Rovell stated that the game would be available on April 10. R.B.I. Baseball 14 released for iOS, PlayStation 3, and Xbox 360 on April 9, 2014. It was ported to Android on May 8. The PlayStation 4 and Xbox One versions released on June 24, with online multiplayer expected to be available in July.

== Reception ==
Reception

Aggregate score
Aggregator	Score
Metacritic	iOS: 63/100 (Note: Score based on 5 reviews.)

Review scores
Publication	Score
Electronic Gaming Monthly	2/10
Game Informer	2/10
IGN	4.5/10
MacLife	2/5
Shacknews	6/10
TouchArcade	4/5

R.B.I. Baseball received "mixed or average" reviews for the iOS version, according to review aggregator Metacritic.

Some critics disliked lack of online multiplayer options. Referring to the online support and difficulty options, Robert Workman of Shacknews felt that the game would have benefited from an update. The presentation was called "monotonous" and "personality-free" by MacLife's Andrew Hayward, and IGN's Mike Mitchell stated that the presentation was "poor".

The arcade style of the game was noted by some reviewers. Conversely, Den of Geek's Jason Tabry thought it was too "grounded" to be an arcade game. Both TouchArcade and Slide to Play writers liked the "pick up and play" gameplay. Hayward concluded that the pick up a play mechanics were "decent".

Tabrys felt that adding stat tracking and a 25-man roster would not take away the retro experience. Andrew Reiner of Game Informer agreed, and negatively compared it to Baseball Stars and Bases Loaded, writing that those games offered "more advanced modes and gameplay". Ray Carsillo of EGMNow believed the only good part was the mercy rule. Carsillo wrote "Major League Baseball should be as embarrassed about R.B.I. Baseball 14 as they were about the 1994 strike and the steroid scandals", called it an "abomination", and an "unworthy representation" of the sport.

Game Informer later listed R.B.I. Baseball 14 as one of the worst games of 2014. In a review of 2014 sports video games, Samit Sarkar mentioned the game "didn't turn out so great".
