= CIC (Nintendo) =

Security lockout chip used in Nintendo game consoles

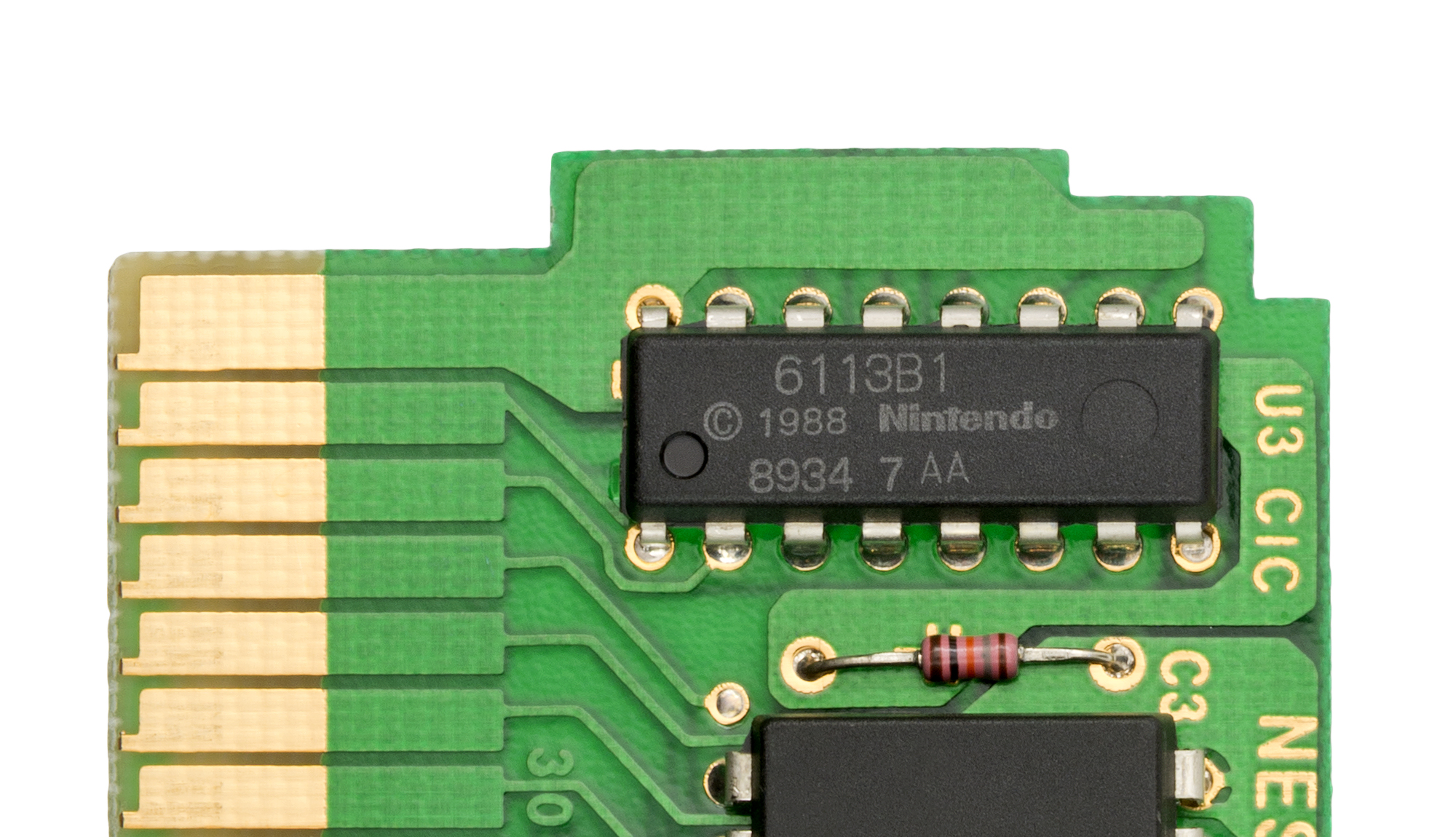
The CIC chip from a Tetris cartridge

The Checking Integrated Circuit (CIC), also known as the 10NES system, is a lockout chip designed by Nintendo for the Nintendo Entertainment System (NES) video game console in 1985; the chip is part of a system known as 10NES, in which a key (which is stored in the game) is used by the lock (stored in the console) to check that the game is authentic and that the game is for the same region as the console.

The chip was designed in response to the North American video game crash of 1983, which was partially the result of a lack of both publishing and quality control; the idea was that by forcing third-party developers to have their games go through an approval process, Nintendo could stop shovelware from entering the market. Improved designs of the CIC chip were also used in the later Super Nintendo Entertainment System and the Nintendo 64, although running an updated security program that performs additional checks.

The lockout chip was controversial, with several developers opting to release their games without Nintendo's approval by using workarounds; the most well-known of these was Tengen (a subsidiary of Atari Games), which copied the CIC chip, resulting in their games running without issue. In response, Nintendo sued Atari for copyright infringement.

== Design ==
The 10NES system is a lock-out system designed for the North American and European versions of the Nintendo Entertainment System (NES) video game console. The electronic chip serves as a digital lock which can be opened by a key in the games, designed to restrict the software that could be operated on the system.

The chip was not present for the original Family Computer in 1983, leading to a large number of unlicensed cartridges in the Asian market. They were, however, added for international variants as a response to the 1983 video game crash in North America, partially caused by an oversaturated market of console games due to lack of publishing control. Nintendo president Hiroshi Yamauchi said in 1986: "Atari collapsed because they gave too much freedom to third-party developers and the market was swamped with rubbish games." By requiring the presence of the 10NES in a game cartridge, Nintendo prevented third-party developers from producing games without Nintendo's approval, and provided the company with licensing fees, a practice it had already established earlier with Famicom games.

The system consists of two parts: a Sharp 4-bit SM590 microcontroller in the console (the "lock") that checks the inserted cartridge for authentication, and a matching chip in the game cartridge (the "key") that gives the code upon demand. If the cartridge does not successfully provide the authentication, then the CIC repeatedly resets the CPU at a frequency of 1 Hz. This causes the television and power LED to blink at the same 1 Hz rate and prevents the game from being playable.

The program used in the NES CIC is called 10NES and was patented under U.S. patent 4,799,635. The source code is copyrighted; only Nintendo can produce the authorization chips. The patent covering the 10NES expired on January 24, 2006, although the copyright is still in effect for exact clones.

== Circumvention ==
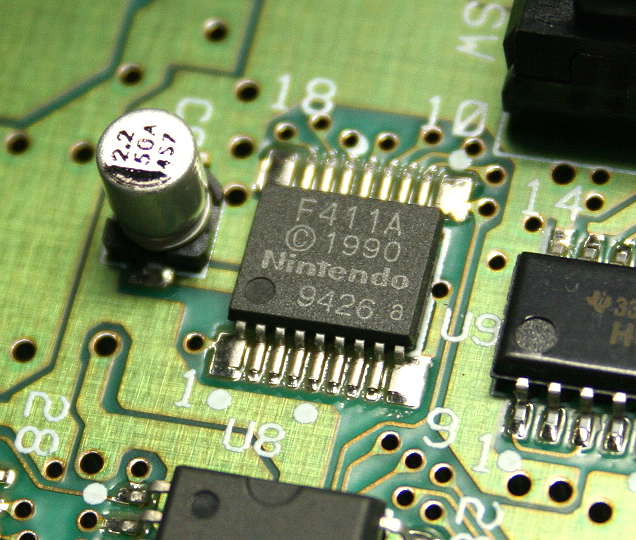
CIC chip on SFC mainboard (F411)

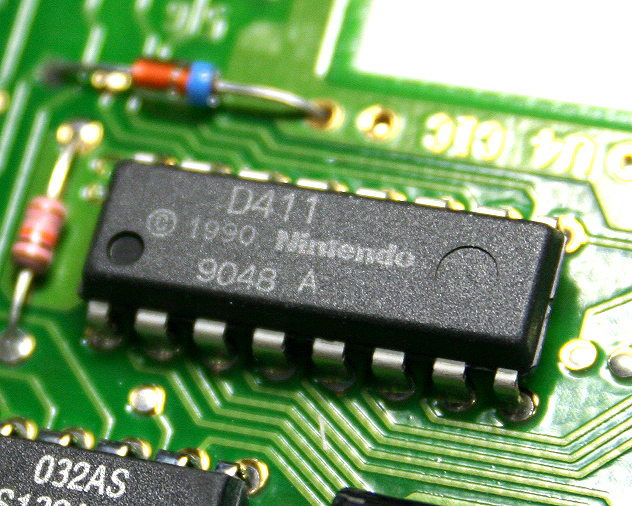
CIC chip on SFC cartridge (D411)

Some unlicensed companies created circuits that used a voltage spike to shut off the CIC before it can perform the authentication checks.

A few unlicensed games released in Europe and Australia (such as HES games) came in the form of a dongle that would be connected to a licensed cartridge, in order to use that cartridge's CIC lockout chip for authentication. This method also worked on the SNES and was utilized by Super Noah's Ark 3D.

Atari Games's home games subsidiary, Tengen, took a different tactic: the corporation obtained a description of the code in the lockout chip from the United States Copyright Office by claiming that it was required to defend against present infringement claims in a legal case. Tengen then used these documents to design their Rabbit chip, which duplicated the function of the 10NES. Nintendo sued Tengen for these actions. The court found that Tengen did not violate the copyright for copying the portion of code necessary to defeat the protection with current NES consoles, but did violate the copyright for copying portions of the code not being used in the communication between the chip and console. Tengen had copied this code in its entirety because future console releases could have been engineered to pick up the discrepancy. On the initial claim, the court sided with Nintendo on the issue of patent infringement, but noted that Nintendo's patent would likely be deemed obvious as it was basically U.S. patent 4,736,419 with the addition of a reset pin, which was at the time already commonplace in the world of electronics. An eight-person jury later found that Atari did infringe. While Nintendo was the winner of the initial trial, before they could actually enforce the ruling they would need to have the patent hold up under scrutiny, as well as address Tengen's antitrust claims. Before this occurred, the sides settled.

A small company called RetroZone, the first company to publish games on the NES in over a decade, uses a multi-region lockout chip for NTSC, PAL A, and PAL B called the Ciclone which was created by reverse engineering Tengen's Rabbit chip. It will allow games to be played in more than one region. It is intended to make the games playable on older hardware that uses the 10NES lockout chip and the two other regions, although the top-loading NES does not use a lockout chip. The Ciclone chip is the first lockout chip to be developed after the patent for the 10NES had expired. Since then, there have been a few other open source implementations to allow the general public to reproduce multi-region CICs on AVR microcontrollers.

Because the 10NES in the model NES-001 occasionally fails to authenticate legal cartridges, a common modification is to disable the chip entirely by cutting pin 4 on the NES-001's internal 10NES lockout chip.

Towards the end of the SNES lifespan, the CIC was cloned and used in pirate games. Alternatively the aforementioned method of using a licensed game's CIC chip was possible, as it was used in the SNES version of Super Noah’s Ark 3D.

== See also ==
- Immobiliser – Motor vehicle anti-theft device
- Regional lockout – Type of digital rights management
- Trusted Platform Module – Type of standardized secure cryptoprocessors
