= R.B.I. Baseball =

Baseball video game series

- Cover art of R.B.I. Baseball, the first game of the series.
- Developers: Namco (NES); Atari Games (arcade); Tengen (1988-1994); Novotrade (Home computers, 2); Gray Matter (Super RBI); Behaviour Interactive (14); HB Studios (15, 16); MLB Advanced Media (17-21)
- Publishers: Atari Games (arcade); Tengen (1988-1994); Domark (Home computers, 2); Time Warner Interactive (1995); MLB Advanced Media (14-21)
- Platforms: NES, Arcade, Commodore 64, Amiga, ZX Spectrum, Atari ST, Genesis/Mega Drive, Game Gear, Super NES, 32X, PlayStation 3, PlayStation 4, Xbox 360, Xbox One, Android, iOS, Switch, BL6
- First release: Atari R.B.I. Baseball; September 1987
- Latest release: R.B.I. Baseball 21; March 16, 2021
- Parent series: Family Stadium

R.B.I. Baseball is a baseball sports video game series. R.B.I. stands for "runs batted in". Launched in 1987 as a localized version of Namco's Japanese Family Stadium series, the R.B.I. Baseball series initially ran through 1995. In 2014, the series was rebooted as a competitor to MLB: The Show, with releases each year until its cancellation. The series continued until 2021.

== History ==
Namco developed and released Pro Yakyū: Family Stadium (Pro Baseball: Family Stadium) for the Family Computer (Famicom), the first game in their Family Stadium series, on December 10, 1986. Pro Baseball: Family Stadium was created by Namco programmer Yoshihiro Kishimoto, who had previously worked on games such as Baraduke (1985).

Atari Games released a Nintendo VS. System arcade machine of Family Stadium named Atari R.B.I. Baseball in 1987. Atari programmer Peter Lipson adapted Family Stadium into the American localized version R.B.I. Baseball for the NES, which was published by Atari Games subsidiary Tengen. Subsequent editions were published until 1995, mostly on Sega systems.

In 2014, Major League Baseball Advanced Media, the digital arm of MLB, revived the name for a new series of MLB games featuring arcade-style gameplay influenced by the original series. The new series, which had annual releases, was made available on multiple platforms. The series was meant to contrast the Sony-published and formerly PlayStation-exclusive MLB The Show, which is considered more simulationist in its focus. The final edition of the game was released in 2021.

== Gameplay ==
Screenshot from the first R.B.I. Baseball.

RBI Baseball was the first console game of its kind to be licensed by the Major League Baseball Players Association (MLBPA) and used actual MLB player names, unlike other baseball video games of the late 1980s. As it was not licensed by Major League Baseball (MLB) itself, it did not use team names or logos. Instead, the game contained 8 teams listed by only their location: Boston, California, Detroit, Houston, Minnesota, New York, St. Louis, and San Francisco; their real-life, MLB counterparts were the first place teams in each division in 1986 (Boston, California, Houston, New York) and 1987 (Detroit, Minnesota, St. Louis, San Francisco) MLB seasons. The game also boasted two All-Star teams, American League and National League; the two featured established veterans such as George Brett, Mike Schmidt, Dale Murphy and Andre Dawson—none of whom appeared on the other eight teams—and up-and-coming players like Mark McGwire, Andrés Galarraga, Kevin Seitzer and José Canseco.

Each player has different capabilities in the game; hitters vary in ability to make solid contact, to hit the ball with power, and their base running speed. Vince Coleman is the fastest player in the game; it is very difficult to catch him stealing second base. Pitchers vary in pitching speed, and the extent to which the player can steer the ball left and right during its flight. Pitchers also have varying stamina; as a pitcher gets tired, the ball slows down and is harder to steer. Nolan Ryan and Roger Clemens are two pitchers in the game with the fastest pitches. Fernando Valenzuela, without a hard fastball, has tremendous movement in both directions with his pitches. Mike Scott has a sharp and deceptive breaking ball. The best pitcher is debatable, depending on how they are used by the players. There is no evidence that fielding abilities correspond to individual players.

The abilities of each player do not necessarily correspond with the statistics shown on the screen when the player comes to bat or takes the mound. These statistics are generally accurate, with many exceptions. They do not change during the course of the game or sequence of games.

A rudimentary box score is displayed during and after the game showing composite statistics for each team. A hit batter is credited with a walk, and anyone reaching on an error gets credited for a hit even as the other team is charged with an error. Conversely, a batter thrown out while trying for extra bases is not credited with a hit.

The infield fly rule is not implemented.

The rosters for the eight teams are fairly accurate if simplified representations of the playoff rosters from their respective years. Each team has 8 starting batters, four bench players, two starting pitchers and two relievers. The player can start any pitcher they like, though the relievers have very low stamina. If they play consecutive games without resetting the system, any starting pitcher used in the previous game will be unavailable. The player has to wait until the game starts before substituting players with pinch hitters, who can play any position. Pinch runners are not implemented.

Unlike Major League Baseball, R.B.I. Baseball implements the mercy rule—if one team is ahead by ten or more runs after any number of completed innings, the game ends immediately.

Additionally, while the statistics shown on the screen for each player in the original game were reasonably accurate, their playing attributes were not always accurate. For example, George Brett was depicted in-game as a right-handed batter, while the real-life Brett batted left-handed. Also, all real-life switch hitters, such as Tim Raines, were depicted exclusively as left-handed batters.

In Vs. RBI Baseball, the teams are made up of legends from 10 different franchises. These players were statistically represented with their best seasons. A notable exception was McGwire, who was included on the Oakland team, and was statistically represented by his potential numbers. In a remarkable display of foresight, he was projected to hit 62 home runs in his best season. In 1998, he set the then-major league record for home runs in a season with 70.

From the second game onward in the original R.B.I. Baseball series, all of the (then) 26 (later 28) Major League Baseball teams were featured; however, these later games also did not have a full MLB license, so the teams were only identified by their cities (though they still had real player names as they had the MLBPA license). Beginning with the third game in the series, some playoff teams of the recent past were featured, which also include the rosters of those teams in the years that they qualified.

== Games ==
=== Original series ===
Game	Details
R.B.I. Baseball Original release dates: NA: September 1987 (arcade); NA: June 1988 (NES); AU: 1989 (NES)	Release years by system: 1987 – Nintendo VS. System; 1988 – Nintendo Entertainment System
R.B.I. Baseball Original release dates: NA: September 1987 (arcade); NA: June 1988 (NES); AU: 1989 (NES)	Notes: Based on Pro Yakyū: Family Stadium.; Released as Atari R.B.I. Baseball in the arcades.; Released as R.B.I. Baseball on the NES.
R.B.I. Baseball 2 Original release dates: NA: 1990 (NES); NA: 1991 (Home Computers); EU: 1991 (Home Computers)	Release years by system: 1990 – Nintendo Entertainment System; 1991 – Commodore 64, Amiga
R.B.I. Baseball 3 Original release dates: NA: 1991 (NES); NA: October 1991 (Gen)	Release years by system: 1991 – Nintendo Entertainment System, Sega Genesis
R.B.I. Baseball 4 Original release dates: NA: September 1992; JP: December 18, 1992	Release years by system: 1992 – Sega Genesis
R.B.I. Baseball '93 Original release dates: NA: June 1993	Release years by system: 1993 – Sega Genesis
R.B.I. Baseball '94 Original release dates: NA: April 1994; EU: June 16, 1994; NA: October 1994 (Game Gear)	Release years by system: 1994 – Sega Genesis, Game Gear
Super R.B.I. Baseball Original release date(s): NA: June 1995	Release years by system: 1995 – Super Nintendo Entertainment System
R.B.I. Baseball '95 Original release date(s): NA: 1995	Release years by system: 1995 – Sega 32X

=== Modern series ===
Game	Details
R.B.I. Baseball 14 Original release dates: NA: April 8, 2014 (iOS); NA: April 9, 2014 (PS3, X360); NA: June 24, 2014 (PS4, XONE)	Release years by system: 2014 – PlayStation 3, PlayStation 4, Xbox 360, Xbox One, Android, iOS, Steam
R.B.I. Baseball 14 Original release dates: NA: April 8, 2014 (iOS); NA: April 9, 2014 (PS3, X360); NA: June 24, 2014 (PS4, XONE)	Notes: Developed by Behaviour Interactive and published by MLB Advanced Media.
R.B.I. Baseball 15 Original release dates: NA: March 31, 2015 (PS4); NA: April 1, 2015 (XONE); NA: April 22, 2015 (iOS, AND); NA: April 30, 2015 (Steam)	Release years by system: 2015 – PlayStation 4, Xbox One, Android, iOS, Steam
R.B.I. Baseball 15 Original release dates: NA: March 31, 2015 (PS4); NA: April 1, 2015 (XONE); NA: April 22, 2015 (iOS, AND); NA: April 30, 2015 (Steam)	Notes: Developed by HB Studios and published by MLB Advanced Media.
R.B.I. Baseball 16 Original release dates: NA: March 29, 2016 (PC, iOS, AND); NA: April 5, 2016 (MAC, PS4, XONE)	Release years by system: 2016 – PlayStation 4, Xbox One, Android, iOS, Steam
R.B.I. Baseball 16 Original release dates: NA: March 29, 2016 (PC, iOS, AND); NA: April 5, 2016 (MAC, PS4, XONE)	Notes: Developed by HB Studios and published by MLB Advanced Media.
R.B.I. Baseball 17 Original release dates: NA: March 28, 2017 (iOS, PS4, XONE); NA: April 4, 2017 (AND); WW: September 5, 2017 (NS)	Release years by system: 2017 – PlayStation 4, Xbox One, Android, iOS, Nintendo Switch
R.B.I. Baseball 17 Original release dates: NA: March 28, 2017 (iOS, PS4, XONE); NA: April 4, 2017 (AND); WW: September 5, 2017 (NS)	Notes: Developed and published by MLB Advanced Media.
R.B.I. Baseball 18 Original release dates: NA: March 20, 2018 (PS4, XONE); NA: March 27, 2018 (iOS); NA: May 2, 2018 (AND); NA: June 14, 2018 (NS)	Release years by system: 2018 – PlayStation 4, Xbox One, Android, iOS, Nintendo Switch
R.B.I. Baseball 18 Original release dates: NA: March 20, 2018 (PS4, XONE); NA: March 27, 2018 (iOS); NA: May 2, 2018 (AND); NA: June 14, 2018 (NS)	Notes: Developed and published by MLB Advanced Media.
R.B.I. Baseball 19 Original release dates: NA: March 5, 2019 (PS4, XONE, NS)	Release years by system: 2019 – PlayStation 4, Xbox One, Nintendo Switch, Android, iOS
R.B.I. Baseball 19 Original release dates: NA: March 5, 2019 (PS4, XONE, NS)	Notes: Developed and published by MLB Advanced Media.
R.B.I. Baseball 20 Original release dates: NA: March 16, 2020; NA: November 17, 2020 (BL6); PAL: March 24, 2020; JP: April 2, 2020	Release years by system: 2020 – PlayStation 4, Xbox One, Nintendo Switch, Android, iOS, Steam, BL6
R.B.I. Baseball 20 Original release dates: NA: March 16, 2020; NA: November 17, 2020 (BL6); PAL: March 24, 2020; JP: April 2, 2020	Notes: Developed and published by MLB Advanced Media.
R.B.I. Baseball 21 Original release dates: WW: March 16, 2021	Release years by system: 2021 – PlayStation 4, Xbox One, Xbox Series X/S, Nintendo Switch, Android, iOS, Steam
R.B.I. Baseball 21 Original release dates: WW: March 16, 2021	Notes: Developed and published by MLB Advanced Media.

== Reception ==
Most every edition of R.B.I. Baseball typically received "generally unfavorable reviews" from critics starting with its 2014 reboot, according to review aggregator Metacritic. R.B.I. Baseball 19 received "mixed or average reviews".

IGN called R.B.I. Baseball 14 and 15 "bad". Forbes gave bad reviews to 16, 17, and 18. 18 was criticized for its animation and collision detection. Polygon called R.B.I. Baseball 18 "primitive".

R.B.I. Baseball 18 was nominated for "Sports Game" and "Strategy/Simulation Game" at the 2019 Webby Awards.
