= Lockout chip =

Hardware security feature

In a general sense, a lockout chip is a chip within an electronic device to prevent other manufacturers from using a company's device to perform certain functions.

A notable example is the lockout chip found in Nintendo's Nintendo Entertainment System (called 10NES), designed to prevent "unlicensed" manufacturers from creating games for the console. The presence of the chip forced unlicensed companies to raise the price of each cartridge (due to a bypass chip having to be added to the cartridge), and allowed Nintendo a foothold for a lawsuit.

Lockout functions are commonly used in printers to prevent the use of third-party ink or toner cartridges.

== See also ==
- Regional lockout
- CIC (Nintendo)
- Vendor lock-in
- Software protection dongle
- Lexmark International, Inc. v. Static Control Components, Inc., a U.S. Sixth Circuit case rejecting copyright-related claims in lockout chips
