= Missile Command =

1980 video game

- North American arcade flyer
- Developer: Atari, Inc. (Note: Game Boy and Game Boy Color versions developed by The Code Monkeys.)
- Publishers: Atari, Inc.: Arcade; NA/EU: Atari, Inc.; JP: Taito/Sega Game Boy Accolade, Inc. Game Boy Color Hasbro Interactive
- Designer: Dave Theurer
- Programmers: Rich Adam; Dave Theurer
- Composer: Rich Adam
- Series: Missile Command
- Platforms: Arcade, Atari 2600, Atari 8-bit, Atari 5200, Atari ST, Game Boy, Game Boy Color
- Release: June 1980: Arcade; NA: June 1980; JP: July 1980; EU: 1980 2600; April 1981 Atari 8-bit; 1981 5200; October 1982 Atari ST; 1987 Game Boy; NA: March 1992; EU: 1992 Game Boy Color; NA: September 1999; EU: 1999
- Genre: Shoot 'em up
- Modes: Single-player, multiplayer

Missile Command is a 1980 shoot 'em up video game developed and published by Atari, Inc. for arcades. It was released by Taito and Sega in Japan. The game was designed by Dave Theurer, who would also design Tempest for Atari the following year. The player uses a trackball to defend six cities from intercontinental ballistic missiles by launching anti-ballistic missiles from three bases.

Missile Command was released in June 1980 during the Cold War, where it achieved widespread critical and commercial success. Atari then ported it to home systems beginning with an Atari 2600 conversion in 1981 by Rob Fulop. Numerous clones and modern remakes soon followed, and the version ported to Atari's 8-bit computers was reused for the 5200 in 1982 and built into the XEGS in 1987. It is considered to be one of the greatest video games of all time.

== Gameplay ==
A screenshot of the Atari 5200 port of Missile Command, showing ballistic missiles descending on the six cities at the bottom of the image

In Missile Command, six cities are being attacked by an endless hail of ballistic missiles, some of which split like multiple independently targetable reentry vehicles. New weapons are introduced in later levels: smart bombs that can evade a less-than-perfectly targeted missile, and bomber planes and satellites that fly across the screen launching missiles of their own. The player takes control three missile batteries in an effort to defend the cities for as long as possible.

The game is played by moving a crosshair across the sky background via a trackball and pressing one of three buttons to launch a counter-missile from the appropriate battery. Counter-missiles explode upon reaching the crosshair, leaving a fireball that persists for several seconds and destroys any enemy missiles or craft that enter it. The three batteries provided are each armed with ten missiles; a battery becomes useless when all of its missiles have been launched or if it is destroyed by enemy fire, whichever occurs first. The missiles of the center battery fly to their targets at much greater speed than those fired from the other two; only these missiles can effectively destroy a smart bomb at a distance.

The game is staged as a series of levels of increasing difficulty. Each level contains a set number of enemy weapons, which attack both the cities and the missile batteries and can destroy any target with one hit. Enemy weapons are only able to destroy three cities during one level. A level ends when all enemy weapons have been destroyed or have reached their target. A player who runs out of missiles no longer has control over the remainder of the level. At the conclusion of a level, the player receives bonus points for all remaining missiles and cities; at preset score intervals, the player earns a bonus city that can be used to replace a destroyed one at the end of the current level. These bonus cities can be kept in reserve and are automatically deployed as needed. The scoring multiplier begins at 1x and advances by 1x after every second level, to a maximum of 6x; this multiplier affects both target and bonus values.

The game inevitably ends once all six cities are destroyed and the player neither has any in reserve nor earns one during the current level. Like most early arcade games, there is no way to "win"; the enemy weapons become faster and more prolific with each new level. The game, then, is just a contest in seeing how long the player can survive. On conclusion of the game, the screen displays "The End", rather than "Game Over", signifying that "in the end, all is lost. There is no winner". This conclusion is skipped, however, if the player makes the high score list and the game prompts the player to enter their initials.

== Development ==
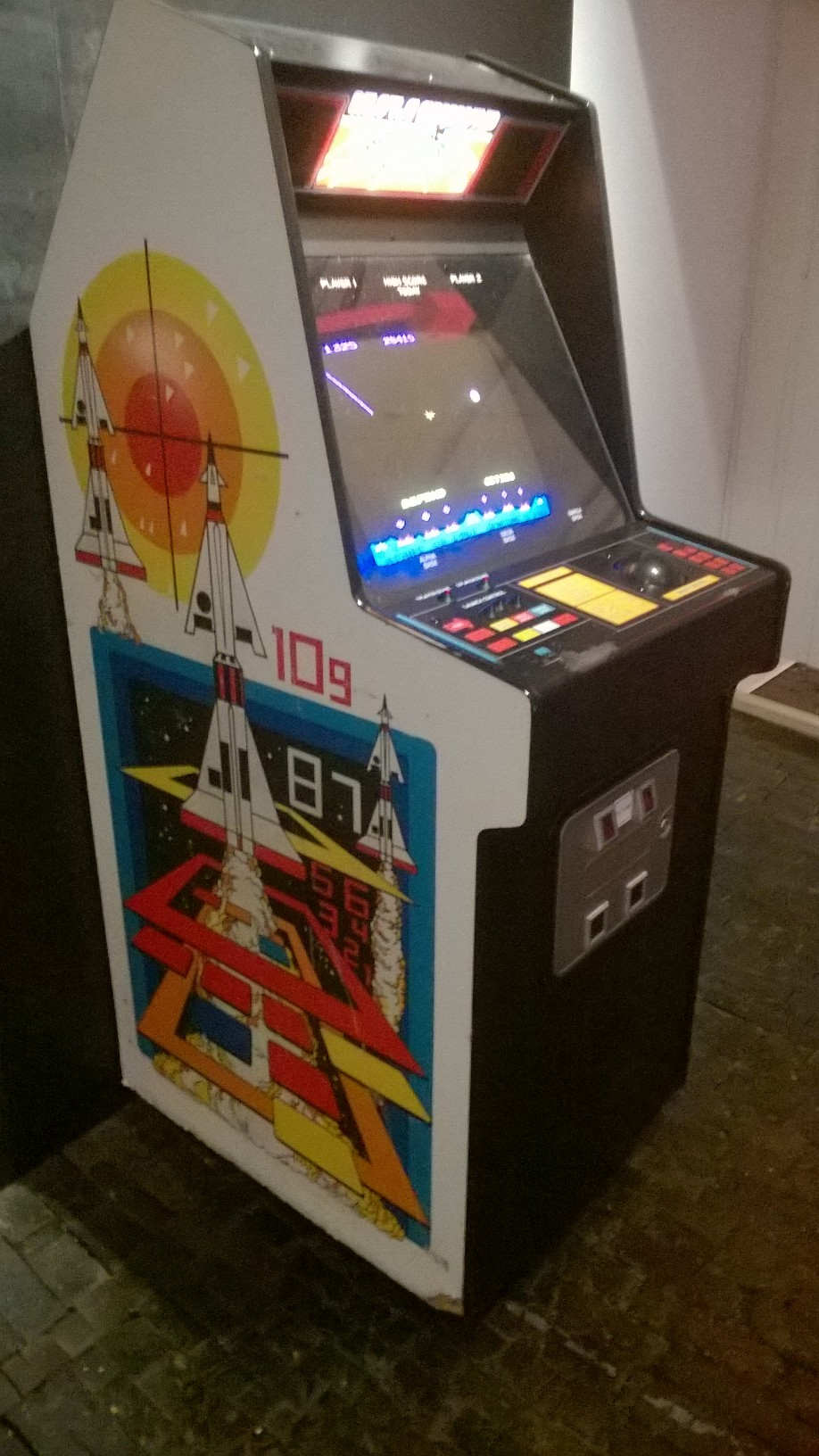
A Missile Command arcade cabinet on display at the Rupriikki Media Museum

Having found a picture of a radar screen in a magazine, Gene Lipkin, then president of Atari's coin-op division, tasked department head Steve Calfee to "Make me a game like this". At this time, games were usually developed by a single programmer with a deadline of six months. If the project was high-profile, this programmer could be assigned a junior programmer as an extra resource. Dave Theurer, who was free after finishing Atari Soccer as a junior programmer, was offered the project, loosely defined as "radar screen showing missiles fired from the USSR toward the US, which is defended by the player". Because the project was requested by a boss, it was considered "high profile" and a junior programmer, Rich Adam, was assigned to Theurer.

Calfee, Theurer and Adam then worked on refining the game concept. In early iterations, the cities represented six cities in California: Eureka, San Francisco, San Luis Obispo, Santa Barbara, Los Angeles, and San Diego. While Theurer understood the assignment of making a patriotic game, the current political climate made Theurer hesitant about the possible violent incitations. While enthusiastic about his first project, Theurer put two conditions to his work: neither the attacking nor defending states would be named, and the game would be purely defensive and never put players in situations where they would be the aggressor. As a result, the city names were removed completely. Players would also not be able to retaliate, as that would be a scenario of mutual assured destruction, which Theurer didn't find noble: "I did not want to put the player in a position of being a genocidal maniac. Only a crazy person would sling nuclear weapons without context, right?". Removing mentions of countries and cities would also leave the story's details to the player's imagination. The only possible game outcome of total destruction was also a message on the futility of war.

To make the game fast-paced, Theurer opted for a trackball as a control, faster than a joystick. The game would also be the first color game made by Atari. Both features ensured the game would stand out compared to the competition of the time. The cabinet would also be innovative, featuring an extra panel of light indicators tied to events in the game.

As the deadline was approaching, the programmers started crunching heavily and Theurer suffered from nightmares of being destroyed by a nuclear blast. A common observation at Atari at the time was that no programmer ever succeeded at having their first game released. This common occurrence was seen as a part of a programmer's learning curve but was putting extra pressure on Theurer (this rule was later named "Theurer's law" for being a famous exception).

Coin-op games had to go through early "field tests" where Atari would pay an arcade owner to place their prototype in the arcade for a few days so that the developers could observe player behaviour and reaction, find bugs and ensure the players were understanding the game and having fun. The game was an instant hit but the extra indicator panel was distracting the player and taking their attention from the screen, thus was scrapped entirely.

== Reception ==
Reception

Review score
Publication	Score
AllGame	5/5 (Arcade); 4/5 (Atari 5200); 3.5/5 (GBC)

Missile Command is considered one of the classic video games from the golden age of arcade games. It is also noted for its manifestation of the Cold War's effects on popular culture, in that it features an implementation of National Missile Defense and parallels real-life nuclear war.

The game was an instant hit, hailed for its uniqueness, color graphics and challenging, score-based gameplay, which were massive draws for arcade games at the time. The game sold nearly 20,000 arcade cabinets. Missile Command was a commercial success for Sega in Japan, where it was among the top ten highest-grossing arcade games of 1980.

In 1983, Softline readers named the Atari 8-bit version of Missile Command eighth on the magazine's top thirty list of Atari programs by popularity. In a retrospective review, Brett Weiss of Allgame gave the arcade version a perfect score of 5 out of 5, in terms of controls, frenetic gameplay, sound effects, theme, and strategic aiming and firing.

In 1995, Flux magazine ranked the arcade version 24th on their "Top 100 Video Games".

== Ports ==
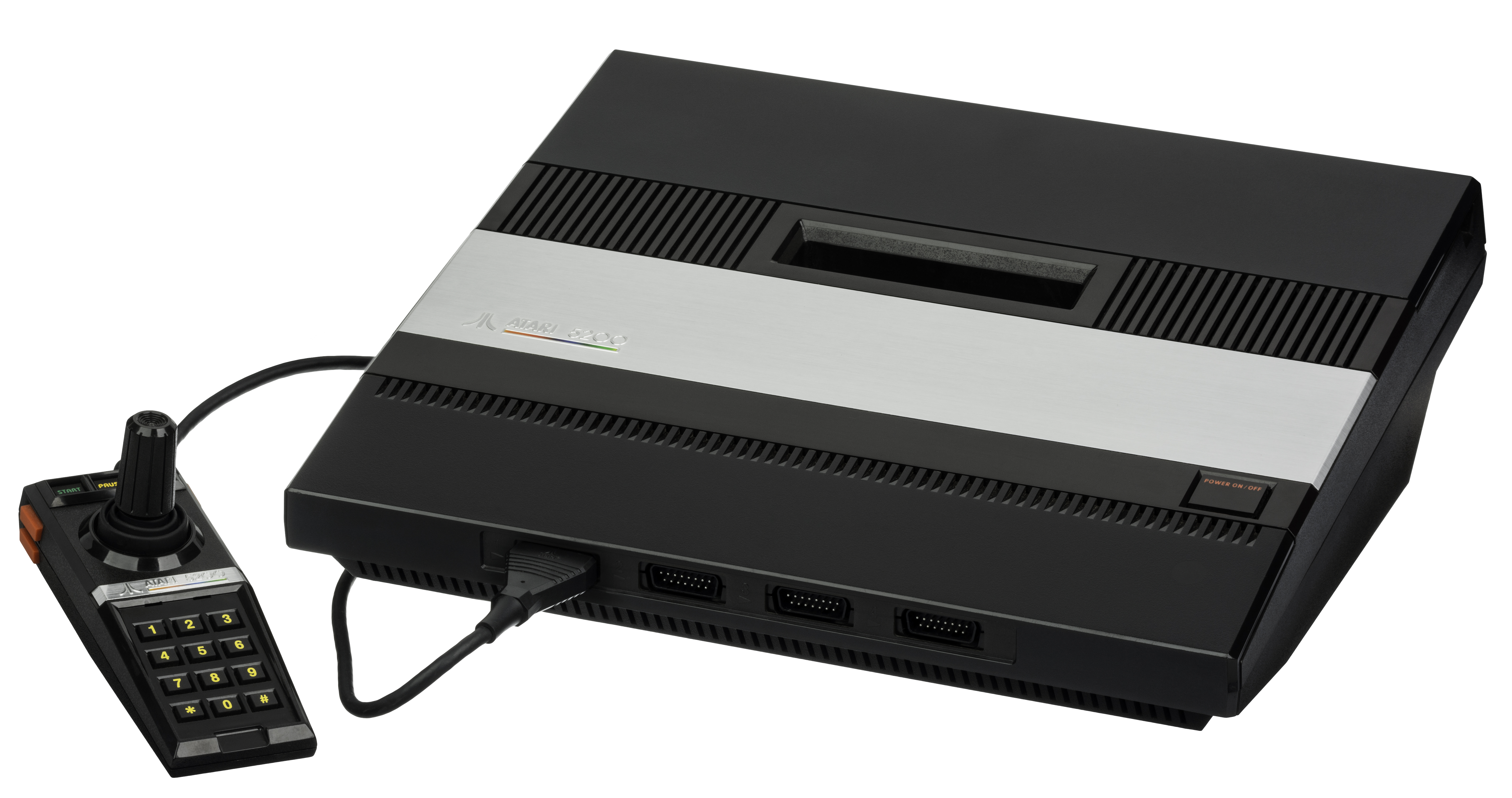
In 1982, Missile Command was ported to the Atari 5200 console (pictured), where it sold well despite the console being a commercial failure.

Missile Command was ported to the Atari 2600 in 1981. The game's instruction manual describes a war between two planets: Zardon (the defending player) and Krytol. The original arcade game contains no reference to these worlds. On level thirteen, if the player exhausts their missile supply without scoring any points, at the end of the game the city on the right will turn into "RF" – the initials of the programmer Rob Fulop. This Easter egg is originally documented in Atari Age (Volume 1, issue #2) in a letter to the editor by Joseph Nickischer, and is the second one publicly acknowledged by Atari. In an interview with Paleotronic Magazine, Fulop stated that Atari paid him for his work by giving him a Safeway coupon for a free turkey, which motivated him to leave the company and co-found competing developer Imagic.

Missile Command was released for Atari 8-bit computers in 1981, followed by an identical version for the Atari 5200 in 1982. The same Atari 8-bit port was later used in the 1987 Atari XEGS as a built-in game that boots up if no cartridge has been loaded into the console.

In 1992, Accolade released a version of Missile Command for the Game Boy; it was later re-released by Nintendo in a double pack with the Game Boy version of Asteroids in 1995 as part of the Arcade Classic series. A similar version was published by Hasbro Interactive for the Game Boy Color in 1999.

== Legacy ==
=== Re-releases ===
Missile Command has seen many re-releases in many Atari compilation titles:

- The game is included in Arcade Classics for the Sega Genesis and Game Gear and a similar Master System compilation titled Arcade Smash Hits.
- The game was released for Microsoft Windows as part of the Microsoft Arcade package in 1993.
- The game is included in the Midway Games-published Arcade's Greatest Hits: The Atari Collection 1 for the Sega Saturn, Super Nintendo Entertainment System, and the PlayStation.
- It is also included in Atari Arcade Hits 1, Atari Greatest Hits, Atari Anniversary Edition and Atari: 80 Classic Games in One!.
- The game appears as a bonus unlockable minigame in the PlayStation 2 and Xbox versions of Terminator 3: Rise of the Machines, that can be unlocked once it has been played on a hidden computer in one of the levels.
- The game was made available for the Xbox and PlayStation 2 (in both arcade and Atari 2600 versions) as part of Atari Anthology in 2004.
- The game is included in Retro Atari Classics and Atari Greatest Hits Volume 1 for the Nintendo DS. The former title also includes a remixed art version.
- Both the arcade and 2600 versions are part of Atari Vault (2016).
- Both the Atari 2600 and 7800 versions were released on the Evercade as part of Arcade Collection 1 and 2 in 2020.
- The arcade, 2600 and 5200 versions were included in Atari 50 (2022) for the Atari VCS, Nintendo Switch, PlayStation 4, PlayStation 5, Windows, Xbox One, and Xbox Series X/S.

=== Sequels ===
In late 1980, a two-player sequel Missile Command 2 was field tested but never released, although at least one prototype appeared in an arcade in Santa Clara, California. This game was similar to the original except that each player had their own set of cities and missile batteries and the players could cooperate to save each other's cities from the onslaught.

In 1992, Atari developed a prototype of an arcade game called Arcade Classics for their 20th anniversary, which included Missile Command 2 and Super Centipede. Despite its name, however, this version was not the unreleased sequel, but an enhanced remake of the first game.

In 1981, an enhancement kit was made by General Computer Corp. to convert Missile Command into Super Missile Attack. This made the game even harder, and added a UFO to the player's enemies.

In 1982, Atari released a game called Liberator, which was seen by some as being a sequel to Missile Command with the situation essentially reversed; in Liberator, the player is the one attacking planetary bases from orbit.

=== Updated versions ===
Screenshot of Missile Command for the Xbox 360

An updated version called Missile Command 3D was released for the Atari Jaguar in 1995. It contains three versions of the game: Classic (a straight port of the arcade game), 3D (graphically upgraded and with a rotating viewpoint), and Virtual. It is the only game that works with the virtual reality helmet from Virtuality.

Hasbro Interactive released a 3D remake of Missile Command for Microsoft Windows and PlayStation in 1999.

A port of Missile Command with high-definition graphics was released via Xbox Live Arcade for the Xbox 360 on July 4, 2007.

Missile Command was released for the iPhone and iPod Touch for US$5 on September 23, 2008. It includes two gameplay modes ("Ultra" and "Classic").

In March 2020, Atari released a new remake, Missile Command: Recharged, on mobile platforms, the first in the Atari Recharged series. On May 27, the remake also made it to Nintendo Switch as well as home computers via Steam, later on released as a launch title on the Atari VCS.

An updated version of the game was announced in 2018 for the Intellivision Amico. While neither the Intellivision Amico version of Missile Command nor the Amico console itself have yet released, a mobile version was announced in late 2023, as part of Intellivision's Amico Home initiative. This version was released for Android the same year, with an iOS version being announced for a later release.

=== Clones ===
Contemporary Missile Command clones include Missile Defense (1981) for the Apple II, Stratos (1982) for the TRS-80, Missile Control (1983) for the BBC Micro, Repulsar (1983) for the ZX Spectrum, and Barrage (1983) for the TI-99/4A. Silas Warner programmed the 1980 clone ABM for the Apple II several years before writing Castle Wolfenstein. Similarly, John Field programmed the Missile Command-like game ICBM (1981), then went on to create Axis Assassin, one of the first games published by Electronic Arts.

=== In popular culture ===
- Missile Command was referenced in the 1980 episode "Call Girl" of the TV sitcom Barney Miller, which features a detective who is hooked on the game.
- In the 1991 film Terminator 2: Judgment Day, John Connor plays the game in an arcade, echoing the film's theme of a future global nuclear war.
- The documentary High Score (2006) follows William Carlton, a Portland, Oregon gamer, on his quest to beat the Missile Command high score record for Marathon settings.
- In the 2010 open world survival horror video game, Deadly Premonition, the game is mentioned by the protagonist Francis York Morgan, while driving.
- In the 2008 episode "Chuck Versus Tom Sawyer" of the NBC show Chuck, a weapons satellite access code is hidden in the (fictitious) kill screen of Missile Command by its programmer, Mr. Morimoto (Clyde Kusatsu).
- In the 1982 film Fast Times at Ridgemont High, Missile Command's "The End" screen is used to help illustrate the film's ending.
- The game is shown in the opening title sequence of the 2013 FX television series The Americans.
- The 2015 game Fallout 4 features a holotape called Atomic Command, a clone of Missile Command playable on the Pip-Boy interface in which the player must defend landmarks across the United States from atomic bombs.

=== Film connection and adaptation ===
The gameplay of Missile Command, specifically, the contrails left by incoming ICBMs, and the visuals of cities being destroyed by nuclear warheads on a video display screen, strongly resembles the opening nuclear war scenes from the 1977 film, Damnation Alley.

In February 2010, Atari was talking with several studios to turn Missile Command into a film. 20th Century Fox acquired the rights to bring Missile Command to film the following year. In May 2016, Emmett/Furla Oasis Films closed a deal to partner with Atari to produce and finance films based on Centipede and Missile Command. in 2026 Atari signed a 10-movie deal with Universal Pictures and Entertainment 360 with Missile Command being one of them.

== Competitive play ==
Missile Command has been popular in high-level play, both in marathon settings and tournaments. In 1981, Floridian Jody Bowles played a game of Missile Command for 30 hours at The Filling Station Eatery in Pensacola. Bowles scored 41,399,845 points with one quarter using Marathon settings, besting the previous known record.

On July 3, 1985, Roy Shildt of Los Angeles set a world record in tournament-set Missile Command, with a score of 1,695,265, as verified by Twin Galaxies. This score, as well it earning his induction into the Video Game Hall of Fame, were published in the 1986 edition of Guinness World Records.

More than 20 years later, on March 9, 2006, Tony Temple of the United Kingdom set a new world record of 1,967,830 points, also with Tournament settings as confirmed by Twin Galaxies. Temple's score was published in the 2008 Guinness Book of World Records Gamer's Edition, although Guinness noted that the score was controversial due to Temple playing on game settings that increased cursor speed and was therefore easier than those of Roy Shildt, the previous record holder.

== See also ==
- Golden age of video arcade games
