= Arcade Smash Hits =

1992 video game

- Developer: Images Software
- Publisher: Virgin Games
- Programmer: Anthony Mack
- Artist: Andy Pang
- Composer: Mat Symmonds
- Platform: Master System
- Release: EU: August 1992
- Genre: Various
- Modes: Single-player, multiplayer

Arcade Smash Hits is a video game compilation of published by Virgin Games in 1992 for the Master System. It is a compilation of three games in one cartridge, all of which were originally released in arcades by Atari, Inc. The games are Breakout (1976), Centipede (1981), and Missile Command (1980). They have significant graphical upgrades over the originals. The visuals in Breakout look more like Arkanoid.(1986).

== Reception ==
Reception

Review score
Publication	Score
Mean Machines	51%

The compilation was negatively reviewed by Mean Machines magazine mainly for the slow responsiveness of the games and the lack of new features.

== Legacy ==
In 1996, Sega released a similar collection for the Genesis and Game Gear called Arcade Classics, but with Pong instead of Breakout.
