= Retro Atari Classics =

2005 video game

- North American box art
- Developer: Taniko
- Publisher: Atari
- Composers: Allister Brimble; Anthony N. Putson
- Platform: Nintendo DS
- Release: EU: March 11, 2005; NA: March 15, 2005; AU: March 18, 2005; JP: June 30, 2005
- Genre: Video game compilation
- Mode: Single-player

Retro Atari Classics is a compilation of Atari video games for the Nintendo DS, developed by American studio Taniko and released in 2005 by Atari. The game features classic Atari games as well as remixed versions of each of the selections. The game's development faced challenges of working with the then-changing prototype Nintendo DS hardware. The game received mixed reviews from critics.

== Gameplay ==
Retro Atari Classics is a compilation game that includes 10 different arcade games from Atari's library. Included games are listed below.

- Pong (1972)
- Breakout (1976)
- Asteroids (1979)
- Centipede (1981)
- Gravitar (1982)
- Lunar Lander (1979)
- Missile Command (1980)
- Sprint (1976)
- Tempest (1981)
- Warlords (1981)

Retro Atari Classics includes a "remix" mode which includes updated visuals by graffiti artists for the classic games. The games have been modified from their originals to support both DS screens and include a touch screen.

== Development ==
Development on Retro Atari Classics began before the Nintendo DS had been released. The prototype DS that developer Taniko worked with only had a single screen for six months. Developer Omar Cornut, who was part of Taniko's programming team for the game, later recalled, "A month before they announced the DS, they told us, 'Oh, by the way, there's a second screen on the DS. Enjoy remaking your game.' The game was rubbish, but was interesting."

For the remix versions of the games, Atari hired a number of famous graffiti artists for the designs, including Shepard Fairey who designed OBEY Giant. The title was originally announced by Atari in December 2004. A preview of the game in the same month by GameSpot's Ricardo Torres noted that the DS-specific features were still being tweaked by the developers. A March 2005 preview from GameSpot's Justin Calvert noted that the only game which forced players to use the touch screen was Tempest.

== Reception ==
Reception

Aggregate score
Aggregator	Score
Metacritic	51/100

Review scores
Publication	Score
GameSpot	4.5/10
IGN	5/10
Nintendo Life	4/10

According to Metacritic, the game received average reviews with a 51/100. CNET's Zennith Geisler called the older games "boxy and dull" and noted that the remixed versions "are bright, gaudy, and cheap." GameSpot's Jeff Gerstmann criticized the reprogramming that the classic games went through, noting that the controls were inferior to the original versions. Gerstmann also noted that the remix versions artwork "isn't implemented very well" and said that the collection was "the sort of game that's unpleasing to every possible audience." Nintendo Life's Sean Aaron commented that many of the DS versions of the original arcade games as "disappointing." Both Gerstmann and Aaron singled out Centipede as being especially worse in comparison to their arcade counterpart. IGN's Craig Harris also criticized control scheme decisions, noting that Mission Control was much more difficult because of the limitations of the chosen control scheme. Eurogamer's Kristian Reed felt that Atari's decision to require all players to own the cartridge to engage in multiplayer ruined any potential it had for being fun. Reed also criticized the remix artwork, saying it was "hideous graffiti-strewn abominations that attempt to lend the package some sort of misguided street cool."
