= Golden age of arcade video games =

Late 1970s until early 1980s arcade video games

The golden age of arcade video games was the period of rapid growth, technological development, and cultural influence of arcade video games from the late 1970s to the early 1980s. The release of Space Invaders in 1978 led to a wave of shoot-'em-up games such as Galaxian and the vector graphics-based Asteroids in 1979, made possible by new computing technology that had greater power and lower costs. Arcade video games switched from black-and-white to color, with titles such as Frogger and Centipede taking advantage of the visual opportunities of bright palettes.

Video game arcades became a part of popular culture and a primary channel for new games. Video game genres were still being established, but included space-themed shooter games such as Defender and Galaga, maze chase games that followed the design established by Pac-Man, driving and racing games which more frequently used 3D perspectives such as Turbo and Pole Position, character action games such as Pac-Man and Frogger, and the beginning of what were later called platform games touched off by Donkey Kong. Games began starring named player characters, such as Pac-Man, Mario, and Q*bert, and some of these characters crossed over into other media including songs, cartoons, and movies. The 1982 film Tron was closely tied to an arcade game of the same name.

The golden age of arcade games began to wane in 1983 due to a plethora of clones of popular titles that saturated arcades, and the rise of home video game consoles, both coupled with a moral panic on the influence of arcades and video games on children. This fall occurred during the same time as the video game crash of 1983 but for different reasons, though both marred revenues within the North American video game industry for several years. The arcade game sector revitalized later during the early 1990s particularly with the mainstream success of fighting games.

== Time period ==
Although the exact years differ, most sources agree the period lasted from about the late 1970s to early 1980s.

Technology journalist Jason Whittaker, in The Cyberspace Handbook, places the beginning of the golden age in 1978, with the release of Space Invaders. Video game journalist Steven L. Kent argues in his book The Ultimate History of Video Games that it began the following year, when Space Invaders gained popularity in the United States and when vector display technology, first seen in arcades in 1977's Space Wars, rose to prominence via Atari's Asteroids. Kent says the period ended in 1983, which saw "a fairly steady decline" in the coin-operated video game business and arcades.

RePlay magazine in 1985 dated the arcade industry's "video boom" years from 1979 to 1982. The golden age of arcade games largely coincided with, and partly fueled, the second generation of game consoles and the microcomputer revolution.

== Business ==
The golden age was a time of great technical and design creativity in arcade games. The era saw the rapid spread of not only video arcades across North America, Europe, and Asia. The number of video game arcades in North America was doubled between 1980 and 1982; reaching a peak of 10,000 video game arcades across the region (compared to 4,000 as of 1998). Beginning with Space Invaders, video arcade games also started to appear in supermarkets, restaurants, liquor stores, gas stations, and many other retail establishments looking for extra income. Video game arcades at the time became as common as convenience stores, while arcade games like Pac-Man and Space Invaders appeared in most locations across the United States, including even funeral homes. The sales of arcade video game machines increased during this period from $50 million in 1978 to $900 million in 1981, with 500,000 arcade machines sold in the United States at prices ranging as high as $3,000 in 1982 alone. By 1982, there were 24,000 full arcades, 400,000 arcade street locations and 1.5 million arcade machines active in North America. The market was very competitive; the average life span of an arcade game was four to six months. Some games like Robby Roto failed because they were too complex to learn quickly. Qix was briefly very popular but, Taito's Keith Egging later said, "too mystifying for gamers...impossible to master and when the novelty wore off, the game faded". Around this time, the home video game industry (second-generation video game consoles and early home computer games) emerged as "an outgrowth of the widespread success of video arcades".

In 1980, the U.S. arcade video game industry's revenue generated from quarters tripled to $2.8 billion. By 1981, the arcade video game industry in the United States was generating more than $5 billion a year with some estimates as high as $10.5 billion for all video games (arcade and home) in the U.S. that year, which was three times the amount spent on movie tickets in 1981. The total revenue for the U.S. arcade video game industry in 1981 was estimated at more than $7 billion though some analysts estimated the real amount may have been much higher. By 1982, video games accounted for 87% of the $8.9 billion in commercial games sales in the United States. In 1982, the arcade video game industry's revenue in quarters was estimated at $8 billion surpassing the annual gross revenue of both pop music ($4 billion) and Hollywood films ($3 billion) combined that year. It also exceeded the revenues of all major sports combined at the time, earning three times the combined ticket and television revenues of Major League Baseball, basketball, and American football, as well as earning twice as much as all the casinos in Nevada combined. This was also more than twice as much revenue as the $3.8 billion generated by the home video game industry (during the second generation of consoles) that same year; both the arcade and home markets combined added up to a total revenue between $11.8 billion and $12.8 billion for the U.S. video game industry in 1982. In comparison, the U.S. video game industry in 2011 generated total revenues between $16.3 billion and $16.6 billion.

Prior to the golden age, pinball machines were more popular than video games. The pinball industry reached a peak of 200,000 machine sales and $2.3 billion revenue in 1979, which had declined to 33,000 machines and $464 million in 1982. In comparison, the best-selling arcade games of the golden age, Space Invaders and Pac-Man, had each sold over 360,000 and 400,000 cabinets, respectively, with each machine costing between $2000 and $3000 (specifically $2400 in Pac-Man's case). In addition, Space Invaders had grossed $2 billion in quarters by 1982, while Pac-Man had grossed over $1 billion by 1981 and $2.5 billion by the late 1990s. In 1982, Space Invaders was considered the highest-grossing entertainment product of its time, with comparisons made to the then highest-grossing film Star Wars, which had grossed $486 million, while Pac-Man is today considered the highest-grossing arcade game of all time. Many other arcade games during the golden age also had hardware unit sales at least in the tens of thousands, including Ms. Pac-Man with over 115,000 units, Asteroids with 70,000, Donkey Kong with over 60,000, Defender with 55,000, Galaxian with 40,000, Donkey Kong Junior with 35,000, Mr. Do! with 30,000, and Tempest with 29,000 units. A number of arcade games also generated revenues (from quarters) in the hundreds of millions, including Defender with more than $100 million in addition to many more with revenues in the tens of millions, including Dragon's Lair with $48 million and Space Ace with $13 million.

The most successful arcade game companies of this era included Taito (who ushered in the golden age with the shooter game Space Invaders and produced other successful arcade action games such as Gun Fight and Jungle King), Namco (the Japanese company that created Galaxian, Pac-Man, Pole Position and Dig Dug) and Atari, Inc. (who introduced video games into arcades with Computer Space and Pong, and later produced Asteroids). Other companies such as Sega (who later entered the home console market against its former arch rival, Nintendo), Nintendo (whose mascot, Mario, was introduced in 1981's Donkey Kong as "Jumpman"), Bally Midway Manufacturing Company (which was later purchased by Williams), Cinematronics, Konami, Centuri, Williams and SNK also gained popularity around this era.

During this period, Japanese video game manufacturers became increasingly influential in North America. By 1980, they had become very influential through licensing their games to American manufacturers. Japanese companies eventually moved beyond licensing their games to American companies such as Midway, and by 1981 instead began directly importing machines to the North American market as well as building manufacturing facilities in the United States. By 1982–1983, Japanese manufacturers had more directly captured a large share of the North American arcade market, which Gene Lipkin of Data East USA partly attributed to Japanese companies having more finances to invest in new ideas.

== Technology ==
Arcades catering to video games began to gain momentum in the late 1970s, with Space Invaders (1978) followed by games such as Asteroids (1979) and Galaxian (1979). Arcades became more widespread in 1980 with Pac-Man, Missile Command and Berzerk, and in 1981 with Defender, Donkey Kong, Frogger and others. The central processing unit (CPU) microprocessors in these games allowed for more complexity than earlier transistor-transistor logic (TTL) discrete circuitry games such as Atari's Pong (1972). The arcade boom that began in the late 1970s is credited with establishing the basic techniques of interactive entertainment and for driving down hardware prices to the extent of allowing the personal computer (PC) to become a technological and economic reality.

While color monitors had been used by several racing video games before (such as Indy 800 and Speed Race Twin), it was during this period that RGB color graphics became widespread, following the release of Galaxian in 1979. Galaxian introduced a tile-based video game graphics system, which reduced processing and memory requirements by up to 64 times compared to the previous framebuffer system used by Space Invaders. This allowed Galaxian to render multi-color sprites, which were animated atop a scrolling starfield backdrop, providing the basis for the hardware developed by Nintendo for arcade games such as Radar Scope (1980) and Donkey Kong followed by the Nintendo Entertainment System console.

The golden age also saw developers experimenting with vector displays, which produce crisp lines that can't be duplicated by raster displays. A few of these vector games became great hits, such as 1979's Asteroids, 1980's Battlezone, 1981's Tempest and 1983's Star Wars from Atari. However, vector technology fell out of favor with arcade game companies due to the high cost of repairing vector displays.

Several developers at the time were also experimenting with pseudo-3D and stereoscopic 3D using 2D sprites on raster displays. In 1979, Nintendo's Radar Scope introduced a three-dimensional third-person perspective to the shoot 'em up genre, later imitated by shooters such as Konami's Juno First and Activision's Beamrider in 1983. In 1981, Sega's Turbo was the first racing game to feature a third-person rear view format, and use sprite scaling with full-colour graphics. Namco's Pole Position featured an improved rear-view racer format in 1982 that remained the standard for the genre; the game provided a perspective view of the track, with its vanishing point swaying side to side as the player approaches corners, accurately simulating forward movement into the distance. That same year, Sega released Zaxxon, which introduced the use of isometric graphics and shadows; and SubRoc-3D, which introduced the use of stereoscopic 3D through a special eyepiece.

This period also saw significant advances in digital audio technology. Space Invaders in 1978 was the first game to use a continuous background soundtrack, with four simple chromatic descending bass notes repeating in a loop, though it was dynamic and changed tempo during stages. Rally-X in 1980 was the first game to feature continuous background music, which was generated using a dedicated sound chip, a Namco 3-channel PSG. That same year saw the introduction of speech synthesis, which was first used in Stratovox, released by Sun Electronics in 1980, followed soon after by Namco's King & Balloon.

Developers also experimented with laserdisc players for delivering full motion video based games with movie-quality animation. The first laserdisc video game to exploit this technology was 1983's Astron Belt from Sega, soon followed by Dragon's Lair from Cinematronics; the latter was a sensation when it was released (and, in fact, the laserdisc players in many machines broke due to overuse). While laserdisc games were usually either shooter games with full-motion video backdrops like Astron Belt or interactive movies like Dragon's Lair, Data East's 1983 game Bega's Battle introduced a new form of video game storytelling: using brief full-motion video cutscenes to develop a story between the game's shooting stages, which years later became the standard approach to video game storytelling. By the mid-1980s, the genre dwindled in popularity, as laserdiscs were losing out to the VHS format and the laserdisc games themselves were losing their novelty.

16-bit processors began appearing in several arcade games during this era. Universal's Get A Way (1978) was a sit-down racing game that used a 16-bit CPU, for which it was advertised as the first game to use a 16-bit microcomputer. Another racing game, Namco's Pole Position (1982), used the 16-bit Zilog Z8000 processor. Atari's Food Fight (1983) was one of the earliest games to use the Motorola 68000 processor.

3D computer graphics began appearing in several arcade games towards the end of the golden age. Funai's Interstellar, a laserdisc game introduced at Tokyo's Amusement Machine Show (AM Show) in September 1983, demonstrated pre-rendered 3D computer graphics. Simutrek's Cube Quest, another laserdisc game introduced at the same Tokyo AM Show in September 1983, combined laserdisc animation with 3D real-time computer graphics. Star Rider, introduced by Williams Electronics at the Amusement & Music Operators Association (AMOA) in October 1983, also demonstrated pre-rendered 3D graphics. Atari's I, Robot, developed and released in 1984, was the first arcade game to be rendered entirely with real-time 3D computer graphics.

== Gameplay ==
Space Invaders (1978) established the "multiple life, progressively difficult level paradigm" used by many classic arcade games. Designed by Tomohiro Nishikado at Taito, he drew inspiration from Atari's block-breaker game Breakout (1976) and several science fiction works. Nishikado added several interactive elements to Space Invaders that he found lacking in earlier video games, such as the ability for enemies to react to the player's movement and fire back, with a game over triggered by enemies killing the player (either by getting hit or enemies reaching the bottom of the screen) rather than a timer running out. In contrast to earlier arcade games which often had a timer, Space Invaders introduced the "concept of going round after round." It also gave the player multiple lives before the game ends, and saved the high score. It also had a basic story with animated characters along with a "crescendo of action and climax" which laid the groundwork for later video games, according to Eugene Jarvis.

With the enormous success of Space Invaders, dozens of developers jumped into the development and manufacturing of arcade video games. Some simply copied the "invading alien hordes" idea of Space Invaders and turned out successful imitators like Namco's Galaxian and Galaga, which extended the fixed shooter genre with new gameplay mechanics, more complex enemy patterns, and richer graphics. Galaxian introduced a "risk-reward" concept, while Galaga was one of the first games with a bonus stage. Sega's 1980 release Space Tactics was an early first-person space combat game with multi-directional scrolling as the player moved the cross-hairs on the screen.

Others tried new concepts and defined new genres. Rapidly evolving hardware allowed new kinds of games which allowed for different styles of gameplay. The term "action games" began being used in the early 1980s, in reference to a new genre of character action games that emerged from Japanese arcade developers, drawing inspiration from manga and anime culture. According to Eugene Jarvis, these new character-driven Japanese action games emphasized "character development, hand-drawn animation and backgrounds, and a more deterministic, scripted, pattern-type" of play. Terms such as "action games" or "character games" began being used to distinguish these new character-driven action games from the space shooters that had previously dominated the video game industry. The emphasis on character-driven gameplay in turn enabled a wider variety of subgenres. In 1980, Namco released Pac-Man, which popularized the maze chase genre, and Rally-X, which featured a radar tracking the player position on the map. Games such as the pioneering 1981 games Donkey Kong and Qix introduced new types of games where skill and timing are more important than shooting as fast as possible, with Nintendo's Donkey Kong in particular setting the template for the platform game genre.

The two most popular genres during the golden age were space shooters and character action games. While Japanese developers were creating a character-driven action game genre in the early 1980s, American developers largely adopted a different approach to game design at the time. According to Eugene Jarvis, American arcade developers focused mainly on space shooters during the late 1970s to early 1980s, greatly influenced by Japanese space shooters but taking the genre in a different direction from the "more deterministic, scripted, pattern-type" gameplay of Japanese games, towards a more "programmer-centric design culture, emphasizing algorithmic generation of backgrounds and enemy dispatch" and "an emphasis on random-event generation, particle-effect explosions and physics" as seen in arcade games such as his own Defender (1981) and Robotron: 2084 (1982) as well as Atari's Asteroids (1979).

Namco's Bosconian in 1981 introduced a free-roaming style of gameplay where the player's ship freely moves across open space, while also including a radar tracking player & enemy positions. Bega's Battle in 1983 introduced a new form of video game storytelling: using brief full-motion video cutscenes to develop a story between the game's shooting stages. Other examples of innovative games are Atari Games' Paperboy in 1984 where the goal is to successfully deliver newspapers to customers, and Namco's Phozon where the object is to duplicate a shape shown in the middle of the screen. The theme of Exidy's Venture is dungeon exploration and treasure-gathering. Q*bert plays upon the user's sense of depth perception to deliver a novel experience.

== Popular culture ==
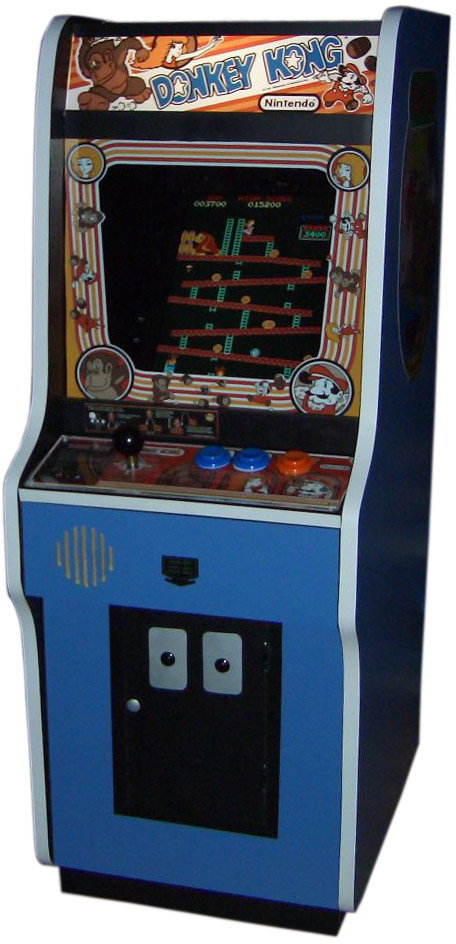
Donkey Kong

Some games of this era were so widely played that they entered popular culture. The first was Space Invaders, released in 1978. A widely believed, yet false, urban legend held that its popularity caused a national shortage of 100 yen coins in Japan. Its release in North America led to hundreds of favorable articles and stories about the emerging medium of video games printed in newspapers and magazines and aired on television. The Space Invaders Tournament held by Atari in 1980 was the first video game competition and attracted more than 10,000 participants, establishing video gaming as a mainstream hobby. By 1980, 86% of the 13–20 year old population in the United States had played arcade video games, and by 1981, there were more than 35 million gamers visiting video game arcades in the United States.

The game that most affected popular culture in North America was Pac-Man. Its release in 1980 caused such a sensation that it initiated what is now referred to as "Pac-Mania" (which later became the title of the last coin-operated game in the series, released in 1987). Released by Namco, the game featured a yellow, circle-shaped creature trying to eat dots through a maze while avoiding pursuing enemies. Though no one could agree what the "hero" or enemies represented (they were variously referred to as ghosts, goblins or monsters), the game was extremely popular. The game spawned an animated television series, numerous clones, Pac-Man-branded foods, toys, and a hit pop song, "Pac-Man Fever". The game's popularity was such that President Ronald Reagan congratulated a player for setting a record score in Pac-Man. Pac-Man was also responsible for expanding the arcade game market to involve large numbers of female audiences across all age groups. Though many popular games quickly entered the lexicon of popular culture, most have since left, and Pac-Man is unusual in remaining a recognized term in popular culture, along with Space Invaders, Donkey Kong, Mario and Q*bert.

Seen as an additional source of revenue, arcade games began popping up outside of dedicated arcades, including bars, restaurants, movie theaters, bowling alleys, convenience stores, laundromats, gas stations, supermarkets, airports, even dentist and doctor offices. Showbiz Pizza and Chuck E. Cheese were founded specifically as restaurants focused on featuring the latest arcade titles.

In 1982, the game show Starcade premiered. The program focused on players competing to achieve high scores on the latest arcade titles, with the chance to win the grand prize of their own arcade machine if they could hit a target score within a specific time frame. The show ran until 1984 on TBS and syndication.

In 1983, an animated television series produced for Saturday mornings called Saturday Supercade featured video game characters from the era, such as Frogger, Donkey Kong, Q*bert, Donkey Kong Jr., Kangaroo, Space Ace, and Pitfall Harry.

Arcade games at the time affected the music industry, revenues for which had declined by $400 million between 1978 and 1981 (from $4.1 billion to $3.7 billion), a decrease that was directly credited to the rise of arcade games at the time. Successful songs based on video games also began appearing. The pioneering electronic music band Yellow Magic Orchestra (YMO) sampled Space Invaders sounds in their 1978 self-titled album and the hit single "Computer Game" from the same album, the latter selling over 400,000 copies in the United States. In turn, YMO had a major influence on much of the video game music produced during the 8-bit and 16-bit eras. Other pop songs based on Space Invaders soon followed, including "Disco Space Invaders" (1979) by Funny Stuff, "Space Invaders" (1980) by Player One (known as Playback in the US), and the hit songs "Space Invader" (1980) by The Pretenders and "Space Invaders" (1980) by Uncle Vic. The game was also the basis for Player One's "Space Invaders" (1979), which in turn provided the baseline for Jesse Saunders's "On and On" (1984), the first Chicago house music track. The song "Pac-Man Fever" reached No. 9 on the Billboard Hot 100 and sold over a million singles in 1982, while the album Pac-Man Fever sold over a million records, with both receiving Gold certifications. That same year, R. Cade and the Video Victims also produced an arcade-inspired album, Get Victimized, featuring songs such as "Donkey Kong". In 1984, former YMO member Haruomi Hosono produced an album entirely from Namco arcade game samples entitled Video Game Music, an early example of a chiptune record and the first video game music album. Arcade game sounds also had a strong influence on the hip hop, pop music (particularly synthpop) and electro music genres during the early 1980s. The booming success of video games at the time led to music magazine Billboard listing the 15 top-selling video games alongside their record charts by 1982. More than a decade later, the first electroclash record, I-F's "Space Invaders Are Smoking Grass" (1997), has been described as "burbling electro in a vocodered homage to Atari-era hi-jinks", particularly Space Invaders which it was named after.

Arcade games also influenced the film industry; beginning with Space Invaders, arcade games began appearing at many movie theaters. Early films based on video games were also produced, most notably Tron, which grossed over $33 million in 1982 which began the Tron franchise which included a video game adaptation that grossed more than the film. Other films based on video games included the 1983 films WarGames (where Matthew Broderick plays Galaga at an arcade), Nightmares, and Joysticks, the 1984 films The Last Starfighter, as well as Cloak & Dagger (in which an Atari 5200 cartridge implausibly containing the eponymous arcade game becomes the film's MacGuffin). Arcades also appeared in many other films at the time, such as Dawn of the Dead (where they play Gun Fight and F-1) in 1978, and Midnight Madness in 1980, Take This Job and Shove It and Puberty Blues in 1981, the 1982 releases Rocky III, Fast Times At Ridgemont High, Koyaanisqatsi and The Toy, the 1983 releases Psycho II, Spring Break, Strange Brew, Terms of Endearment and Never Say Never Again, the 1984 releases Footloose, The Karate Kid (where Elisabeth Shue plays Pac-Man), The Terminator, Night of the Comet and The Adventures of Buckaroo Banzai Across the 8th Dimension, the 1985 releases The Goonies, The Heavenly Kid, Pee Wee's Big Adventure, The Boys Next Door and Ferris Bueller's Day Off as well as the 1986 films Something Wild, The Color of Money, River's Edge and Psycho III (where Norman Bates stands next to a Berzerk cabinet). Over the Top, Can't Buy Me Love, Light of Day and Project X showcase arcade game cabinets as well. Coin-operated games (both video and mechanical) are central to the plots of the 1988 films Big and Kung-Fu Master and also appear in Miracle Mile.

In more recent years, there have been critically acclaimed documentaries based on the golden age of arcade games, such as The King of Kong: A Fistful of Quarters (2007) and Chasing Ghosts: Beyond the Arcade (2007). Since 2010, many arcade-related features or films incorporating 1980s nostalgia have been released including Tron: Legacy (2010), Wreck-It Ralph (2012), Ping Pong Summer (2014), Pixels (2015), Everybody Wants Some!! (2016), Summer of 84 (2018) and Ready Player One (2018) which is based upon the novel by Ernest Cline and directed by Steven Spielberg. Television shows have exhibited arcade games including The Goldbergs and Stranger Things (both of which feature Dragon's Lair among other games).

== Strategy guides ==
The period saw the emergence of a gaming media, publications dedicated to video games, in the form of video game journalism and strategy guides. The enormous popularity of video arcade games led to the very first video game strategy guides; these guides (rare to find today) discussed in detail the patterns and strategies of each game, including variations, to a degree that few guides seen since can match. "Turning the machine over" - making the score counter overflow and reset to zero - was often the final challenge of a game for those who mastered it, and the last obstacle to getting the highest score.

Some of these strategy guides sold hundreds of thousands of copies at prices ranging from $1.95 to $3.95 in 1982 (equivalent to between $7.00 and $13.00 in 2025). That year, Ken Uston's Mastering Pac-Man sold 750,000 copies, reaching No. 5 on B. Dalton's mass-market bestseller list, while Bantam's How to Master the Video Games sold 600,000 copies, appearing on The New York Times mass-market paperback list. By 1983, 1.7 million copies of Mastering Pac-Man had been printed.

== List of popular arcade games ==
The games below are some of the most popular and/or influential games of the era.

Legend
Vector display
Raster display

Name	Year	Manufacturer	Legacy Notes
Space Invaders	1978	Taito (Japan) / Midway (U.S.)	Considered the game that revolutionized the video game industry. The first blockbuster video game, it established the shoot 'em up genre, and has influenced most shooter games since.
Galaxian	1979	Namco (Japan) / Midway (U.S.)	Created to compete with Space Invaders. The first game to use multi-colored, animated sprites. Aliens move in a swooping formation and attack by dive bombing the player's ship.
Lunar Lander	1979	Atari	Arcade version of an earlier minicomputer game concept. First Atari coin-op to use vector graphics.
Asteroids	1979	Atari	Atari's most successful coin-operated game. It is one of the first to allow players to enter their initials for a high score.
Battlezone	1980	Atari	Custom cabinet with novel 2-way dual-joystick controls incorporating top-fire button, and periscope-like viewer. Early use of first-person pseudo 3-D vector graphics. It is widely considered the first virtual reality arcade game. Also used as the basis for a military simulator.
Berzerk	1980	Stern Electronics	Early use of speech synthesis was also translated into other languages in Europe. Indestructible adversary appears in order to eliminate lingering players. This became an oft-employed device (e.g. Hallmonsters in Venture) to increase challenge and limit play duration of arcade games.
Missile Command	1980	Atari	Theme of the game was influenced by the Cold War era.
Pac-Man	1980	Namco (Japan) / Midway (U.S.)	One of the most popular and influential games, it had the first gaming mascot, established maze chase genre, opened gaming to female audiences, and introduced power-ups and cutscenes.
Phoenix	1980	Amstar Electronics / Centuri (U.S.) / Taito (Japan)	One of the first games with a boss battle.
Rally-X	1980	Namco	Driving game with overhead, scrolling maze. First game with a bonus round, background music, and a radar. When released, was predicted to outsell two other new releases: Pac-Man and Defender.
Star Castle	1980	Cinematronics	The colors of the rings and screen are provided by a transparent plastic screen overlay.
Wizard of Wor	1980	Midway	Allowed two-player competitive or cooperative fighting of monsters in maze-like dungeons.
Centipede	1981	Atari	Co-created by programmer Dona Bailey.
Defender	1981	Williams Electronics	Horizontal scrolling space shooting game that was praised for its audio-visuals and gameplay. Was predicted to be outsold by Rally-X, but Defender trounced it, going on to sell 60,000 units.
Tempest	1981	Atari	One of the first games to use a color vector display.
Donkey Kong	1981	Nintendo	Laid foundations for platform game genre as well as visual storytelling in video games, and introduced a carpenter protagonist named Jumpman, a character who evolved into Nintendo's mascot, Mario, in subsequent games.
Frogger	1981	Konami (Japan) / Sega-Gremlin (North America)	Novel gameplay notable for being free of fighting and shooting.
Scramble	1981	Konami (Japan) / Stern (North America)	First scrolling shooter game, featuring forced horizontal scrolling motion.
Galaga	1981	Namco (Japan) / Midway (North America)	Space shooting game that leapfrogged its predecessor, Galaxian, in popularity.
Gorf	1981	Midway	Multiple-mission fixed shooter game. Some of the levels were clones of other popular games. Notable for featuring robotic synthesized speech.
Qix	1981	Taito	The objective is to fence off a supermajority of the play area. Unique gameplay that didn't have shooting, racing, or mazes.
Vanguard	1981	SNK (Japan) / Centuri (US)	Early scrolling shooter that scrolls in multiple directions, and allows shooting in four directions, using four direction buttons, similar to dual-stick controls. Along with Fantasy, Super Cobra and Bosconian, is significant as being among the first video games with a continue screen.
Zaxxon	1981	Sega	First game to employ isometric axonometric projection, which the game was named after.
BurgerTime	1982	Data East (Japan) / Bally Midway (US)	Platform game where the protagonist builds hamburgers while being pursued by food. Original title changed from Hamburger when brought to the U.S. from Japan.
Dig Dug	1982	Namco (Japan) / Atari (North America)	Novel gameplay where underground adversaries were defeated by inflating them or dropping rocks on them. Rated the sixth most popular coin-operated video game of all time.
Donkey Kong Jr.	1982	Nintendo	Jumpman was renamed Mario in this sequel. This was the only time Nintendo's mascot was featured as an antagonist in any of their games.
Front Line	1982	Taito	One of the first of many 1980s games with commando-style infantry ground combat (guns, grenades and tanks) as the theme.
Joust	1982	Williams Electronics	Allowed two-player cooperative or competitive play.
Jungle Hunt	1982	Taito	An early side-scrolling (and diagonal-scrolling) platformer with vine-swinging mechanics, run & jump sequences, climbing hills, and swimming. Almost immediately re-released as Jungle Hunt due to a lawsuit from the Edgar Rice Burroughs estate claiming character copyright infringement on the character of Tarzan. This version changed the Tarzan character to a pith helmet-wearing white explorer.
Kangaroo	1982	Sunsoft (Japan) / Atari (US)	Unusual for a platform game, there is no jump button. Instead, the player pushes up—or up and diagonally—to jump.
Moon Patrol	1982	Irem (Japan) / Williams Electronics (U.S.)	Along with Jungle Hunt, one of the first arcade games with parallax scrolling.
Ms. Pac-Man	1982	Midway (North America) / Namco	One of the most popular of all time, this game was created from a bootlegged hack of Pac-Man. It has four different mazes and moving bonus fruit.
Pengo	1982	Sega	A maze game set in an environment full of ice blocks, which can be used by the player's penguin, who can slide them to attack enemies.
Pole Position	1982	Namco (Japan) / Atari (U.S.)	After Sega's Turbo revolutionized sprite scaling with their third-person cockpit racer, Namco brought 16-bit graphics to the arcade, dropped the player's perspective closer to being directly behind the car, and added dramatic curves to the track. The game also incorporated product placements for companies (including licensee Atari) on passing billboards.
Popeye	1982	Nintendo	Nintendo used higher resolution foreground sprites displayed over lower resolution backgrounds, achieving more impressive visuals.
Q*bert	1982	Gottlieb	Became one of the most merchandised arcade games behind Pac-Man and Donkey Kong.
Robotron 2084	1982	Williams Electronics	Popularized the dual joystick control scheme.
Gravitar	1982	Atari	Not popular in the arcades due to its difficulty, but the gameplay inspired many clones like Thrust and Oids.
Time Pilot	1982	Konami (Japan) / Centuri (U.S.)	Time travel themed aerial combat game with free-roaming gameplay in open air space that scrolls indefinitely in all directions, with player's plane always remaining centered.
Tron	1982	Bally Midway	Earned more than the film it was based on. Gameplay consists of four subgames.
Xevious	1982	Namco (Japan) / Atari (U.S.)	The first arcade video game to have a TV commercial. It was also responsible for popularizing vertical scrolling shooters.
Crystal Castles	1983	Atari	Among the first arcade games which do not loop back to earlier stages as the player progresses, but instead offers a defined ending.
Champion Baseball	1983	Sega	A sports video game that became a major arcade success in Japan, with Sega comparing its success there to that of Space Invaders. It was a departure from the "space games" and "cartoon games" that had previously dominated the arcades, and went on to serve as the prototype for later baseball video games.
Dragon's Lair	1983	Cinematronics (U.S.) / Atari (Europe) / Sidam (Italy)	An early laserdisc video game, which allowed film-quality animation. The first arcade video game in the United States to charge two quarters per play. It was also the first video game to employ what became known as the quick time event. This game is one of three arcade games that are part of the Smithsonian's permanent collection, along with Pac-Man and Pong.
Elevator Action	1983	Taito	An action game that is a mix of platformer, puzzle and shooter genres.
Gyruss	1983	Konami (Japan) / Centuri (U.S.)	Often remembered for its musical score that plays throughout the game, Bach's "Toccata and Fugue in D minor".
Mappy	1983	Namco (Japan) / Bally Midway (U.S.)	Side-scrolling platform game
Mario Bros.	1983	Nintendo	A game featuring simultaneous play with Mario and his brother Luigi as Italian-American plumbers in pest-inhabited sewers. Introduced Luigi for the first time, while also establishing him and Mario as plumbers.
Sinistar	1983	Williams Electronics	First game to use stereo sound. It was also the first to use the 49-way, custom-designed optical joystick that Williams had produced specifically for this game. Notable for appearance of menacing villain.
Spy Hunter	1983	Bally Midway	Overhead view, vehicular combat game that is memorable for its music, "The Peter Gunn Theme", that plays throughout the game.
Star Trek: Strategic Operations Simulator	1983	Sega	Space combat sim featuring five different controls, six different enemies, and 40 different simulation levels. Features voice of Spock and Scotty. One of the most elaborate vector games released.
Star Wars	1983	Atari	Uses several digitized samples of actors' voices from the film.
Tapper	1983	Bally Midway	Originally aligned with American beer Budweiser, was revamped as Root Beer Tapper, so as not to be construed as attempting to peddle alcohol to minors.
Track & Field	1983	Konami (Japan) / Centuri (North America)	The first arcade Olympic sports video game. It helped popularize arcade sports games, which began being produced at levels not seen since the days of Pong and its clones a decade earlier.
1942	1984	Capcom	Capcom's first arcade hit. Features Pacific War air combat. Standardized the template for aerial shoot 'em ups featuring vertical scrolling.
Karate Champ	1984	Technōs Japan/ Data East (US)	The first popular player vs. player fighting game for arcades. Initially released as a dual joystick game with alternating play. The subsequent Player vs. Player version featured four 4-way joysticks.
Kung-Fu Master	1984	Irem (Japan) / Data East (US)	The first side-scrolling beat-em-up arcade game.
Punch-Out!!	1984	Nintendo	A boxing fighting game featuring digitized voices, dual monitors, and a third-person perspective.
Paperboy	1985	Atari	Novel controls and high resolution display.

== List of best-selling arcade games ==
For arcade games, success was usually judged by either the number of arcade hardware units sold to operators, or the amount of revenue generated, from the number of coins (such as quarters or 100 yen coins) inserted into machines, and/or the hardware sales (with arcade hardware prices often ranging from $1000 to $4000). This list only includes arcade games that have sold more than 10,000 hardware units.

- Space Invaders (750,000)
- Pac-Man (400,000)
- Donkey Kong (132,000)
- Ms. Pac-Man (125,000)
- Asteroids (100,000)
- Defender (70,000)
- Centipede (55,988)
- Galaxian (50,000 in the US)
- Hyper Olympic (Track & Field) (38,000 in Japan)
- Donkey Kong Jr. (30,000 in the US)
- Karate Champ (30,000 in the US)
- Mr. Do! (30,000 in the US)
- Tempest (29,000)
- Q*bert (25,000)
- Robotron: 2084 (23,000)
- Dig Dug (22,228 in the US)
- Pole Position (21,000 in the US)
- Popeye (20,000 in the US)
- Missile Command (20,000)
- Jungle Hunt (18,000 in the US)
- Dragon's Lair (16,000)
- Berzerk (15,780)
- Scramble (15,136 in the US)
- Battlezone (15,122)
- Champion Baseball (15,000 in Japan)
- Stargate (15,000)
- Star Wars (12,695)
- Super Cobra (12,337 in the US)
- Space Duel (12,038)
- Atari Football (11,306)
- Gee Bee (10,000)

== Decline and aftermath ==
The golden age cooled around the mid-1980s as copies of popular games began to saturate the arcades. Arcade video game revenues in the United States had declined from $8 billion in 1981 to $5 billion in 1983, reaching a low of $4 billion in 1984. The arcade market had recovered by 1986, with the help of software conversion kits, the arrival of popular beat 'em up games (such as Kung-Fu Master and Renegade), and advanced motion simulator games (such as Sega's "taikan" games including Hang-On, Space Harrier, Out Run and After Burner).

Arcades remained commonplace through to the 1990s as there were still new genres being explored. In 1987, arcades experienced a short resurgence with Double Dragon, which started the golden age of beat 'em up games, a genre that peaked in popularity with Final Fight two years later. In 1988, arcade game revenues in the United States rose back to $6.4 billion, largely due to the rising popularity of violent action games in the beat 'em up and run and gun shooter genres. However, the growth of home video game systems such as the Nintendo Entertainment System led to another brief arcade decline toward the end of the 1980s. In the early 1990s, the Genesis (Mega Drive outside most of North America) and Super NES (Super Famicom in Japan) greatly improved home play and some of their technology was even integrated into a few video arcade machines.

In the early 1990s, the release of Capcom's Street Fighter II established the modern style of fighting games and led to a number of similar games, resulting in a renaissance for the arcades. Another factor was realism, including the "3D Revolution" from 2D and pseudo-3D graphics to true real-time 3D polygon graphics. This was largely driven by a technological arms race between Sega and Namco.

By the early 2000s, the sales of arcade machines in North America had declined, with 4,000 unit sales being considered a hit by the time. One of the causes of decline was new generations of video game consoles and personal computers that sapped interest from arcades.

Since the 2000s, arcade games have taken different routes globally. In the United States, arcades have become niche markets as they compete with the home console market, and they adapted other business models, such as providing other entertainment options or adding prize redemptions. In Japan, some arcades continue to survive in the early 21st century, with games like Dance Dance Revolution and The House of the Dead tailored to experiences that players cannot easily have at home.

== Legacy ==
The Golden Age of Video Arcade Games spawned numerous cultural icons and even gave some companies their identity. Elements from games such as Space Invaders, Pac-Man, Donkey Kong, Frogger, and Centipede are still recognized in today's popular culture, and new entries in the franchises for some golden age games continued to be released decades later.

Pac-Man and Dragon's Lair joined Pong for permanent display at the Smithsonian in Washington, D.C. for their cultural impact in the United States. No other video game has been inducted since.

Emulators such as the Internet Archive Virtual Arcade are able to run these classic games inside a web browser window on a modern computer. The speed difference between current hardware and the original platforms is so great that JavaScript emulators can now run copies of the original arcade ROMs, making them available in their original form rather than as a port.

== See also ==
- 1970s in video games
- 1980s in video games
- Arcade cabinet
- List of arcade video games
