= Boss key (disambiguation) =

A boss key is a special keyboard shortcut used in PC games or other programs to hide the program quickly.

"Boss key" may also refer to:

- Bosskey, an Indian actor, radio jockey, cricketer, television anchor, stand-up comedian, and film critic
- Boss Key Productions, an American video game developer
- a key used in some video games to access a boss level
