= Cube Quest =

1983 LaserDisc-based arcade game

- Flyer for Cube Quest
- Developer: Simutrek
- Publisher: Simutrek
- Designers: Paul Allen Newell; Duncan Muirhead
- Programmers: Paul Allen Newell; Duncan Muirhead
- Platform: Arcade
- Release: NA: December 1983
- Genre: Shoot 'em up
- Mode: Single-player

Cube Quest is a shoot 'em up arcade LaserDisc game by American company Simutrek released in 1983. It was primarily designed and programmed by Paul Allen Newell, who previously wrote some Atari 2600 games. It was introduced at Tokyo's Amusement Machine Show (AM Show) in September 1983 and then the AMOA show the following month, before releasing in North America in December 1983. The game combines real-time 3D polygon graphics with LaserDisc-streamed, animated backgrounds.

== Gameplay ==
A game in progress

The objective of the game is to guide a spaceship through the Cubic World to reach the Treasure of Mytha located at the opposite extreme of the player's origin. Each cube edge leads to one of 54 uniquely themed corridors where a wave of enemies must be dispatched in a tube shooter style gameplay sequence. Destroy the Dewellers of the Dark, up to 1000 points, maneuver the spaceship to avoid the obstacle and destroy the Guardian Cubes, up to 5000 points. Finally, after reaching the Treasure of Mytha, receive a reward befitting the Master of the Cube Quest. After that, the game starts over again.

== Development ==
The game's developer Simutrek was founded by former Atari and Exidy executive Noah Anglin. Paul Allen Newell was responsible for the design and programming. The LaserDisc backgrounds were produced by Robert Abel and Associates. Ken Nordine (uncredited) voiced the introductory narration. The game was planned to be released for the Vectrex, but was cancelled when the console went off the market.

Paul Allen Newell was influenced by the computer animations of John Whitney and Jim Blinn, and early 1980s arcade games such as Pac-Man, Tempest, Centipede and Defender. The game's CGI backgrounds were later used in Beyond the Mind's Eye.

== Reception ==
The game received mixed reviews upon release, with praise for its graphics but criticism over its gameplay. Upon its AM Show debut, the game "was deemed highly complicated for a mainstream electronic diversion" according to Cash Box magazine. Upon its AMOA debut, the game was called "visually stunning" but "hallucinogenic" and "neo-psychedelic" by Cash Box. In Computer Games magazine, Ben Gold and Eugene Jarvis praised the graphics, but Jarvis criticized the gameplay, calling it "a poor version of Tempest."

== Legacy ==
Some researchers, such as Patrick Kellogg, believe that Cube Quest was an inspiration for the Polybius urban legend. Polybius is frequently described as a Tempest-like shoot-em-up with surreal, often harmful visuals that was frequently visited by "men in black" before suddenly disappearing forever. Cube Quest is a Tempest-like game with then-advanced visuals that, due to the unreliable nature of LaserDisc-based video games, was frequently visited for maintenance and often vanished from arcades after a short period of time.

== See also ==
- Astron Belt, another arcade game with graphics overlaid on existing video
- List of LaserDisc games
