= Dave Theurer =

American video game designer

- Born: c. 1955 (age c. 70)
- Education: Wheaton College
- Occupations: Video game designer Programmer
- Employer: Atari, Inc.
- Known for: Missile Command; Tempest; I, Robot

David Theurer (born c. 1955) is a video game designer and computer programmer. In 1980, he created the Missile Command and Tempest arcade games for Atari, Inc., considered two of the major releases from the Golden age of arcade games. Theurer also designed I, Robot for Atari, the first commercial video game with 3D filled-polygonal graphics.

== Early life ==
David attended Wheaton College in Chicago, initially following a path in Chemistry and then Physics, but with two years to go until completion changed once more to Psychology, earning a degree. He has said that earning the degree had helped him create addictive games by using the same techniques originally used on pigeons.

David worked for the college data processing center for approximately six months after graduating. After which he found a job as a junior programmer at Bunker Ramo Corporation, a company that built supermarket computer systems. He moved to California and joined National Semiconductor in 1976. Six months after joining National Semiconductor a co-worker was hired as Manager of Programmers for Atari Games and subsequently hired David without an interview. Theurer cites Pong as his inspiration to become a game designer.

== Atari, Inc. ==
Despite not liking the sport, David's first game for Atari was the four-player version of Atari Football. During the development of Missile Command, David regularly had nightmares which involved the bombing of nearby towns. These nightmares continued after the game had been completed although their regularity decreased. The idea for Tempest was of monsters appearing from a hole in the ground, a scenario from a movie which Theurer had seen as a child.

The last game he worked on for Atari Games—credited as a programmer—was APB in 1987. He left in 1990 to work full-time on DeBabelizer, an automated image editor, graphics optimizer, and file converter for Windows and Macintosh.

In 2012, Theurer was given the Pioneer Award for his work on Atari arcade games.

== Personal life ==
On the way to fireworks displays at Moffett Field on July 4, 1983, Theurer used his Porsche 928 to chase down a hit-and-run driver who had struck Michael McCully, a 15-year-old boy from Los Altos. Michael suffered a severed spine injury and was paralyzed from the waist down. The driver returned to the scene where the California Highway Patrol arrested him for hit-and-run, drunken driving, giving false information to a police officer and driving without a license. David was praised for his efforts by the California Highway Patrol.
