= Microsoft Arcade =

Series of arcade game compilations

- Return of Arcade cover art
- Genre: Various
- Developer: Microsoft
- Publisher: Microsoft
- Platforms: Windows, Mac OS

Microsoft Arcade is a series of classic arcade game compilations released by Microsoft between 1993 and 2000.

Although the games included in these compilations were very similar to the original arcade games in both appearance and gameplay, they were newly written versions, not ports of the original arcade game code; these versions of the games were programmed specifically for Windows, with each game running in a small window (or in a large window with a border). Each game allowed certain customizations not available in the original arcade game, i.e. the number of lives and bonus levels. The Microsoft Help files included with the games contained history of the development of the original arcade versions of the games.

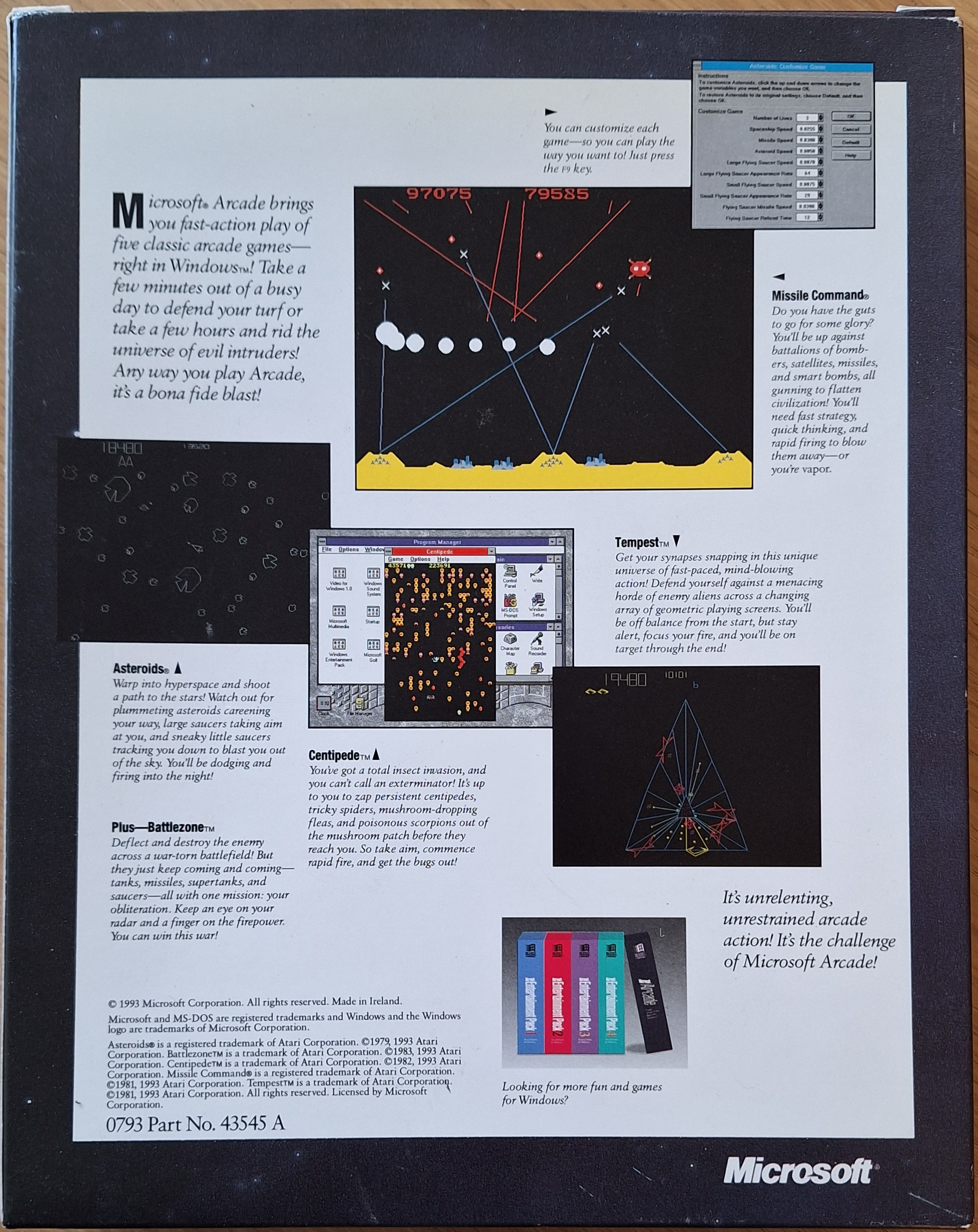
Photograph of the rear of the Microsoft Arcade Packaging

== Microsoft Arcade ==
The first compilation was released in August 1993 on a single 1.44MB floppy for both Microsoft Windows 3.1 and the Apple Macintosh. It contained versions of the following arcade games by Atari:

- Asteroids (1979)
- Battlezone (1980)
- Centipede (1981)
- Missile Command (1980)
- Tempest (1981)

== Microsoft Return of Arcade ==
Two follow-up versions were released, including the arcade games from Namco. The first was Microsoft Return of Arcade, released in April 1996. The compilation sold 335,176 copies in 1996 making it the 8th best-selling PC game that year. This compilation contains:

- Dig Dug (1982)
- Galaxian (1979)
- Pac-Man (1980)
- Pole Position (1982)

In 2000, to celebrate Pac-Man's 20th anniversary, Microsoft re-released Return of Arcade and added Ms. Pac-Man (as presented in Revenge of Arcade) to the roster of games. None of the other games from Revenge of Arcade were included. This updated package was called Microsoft Return of Arcade: Anniversary Edition.

== Microsoft Revenge of Arcade ==
The second follow-up, released in 1998, was called Microsoft Revenge of Arcade and contained:

- Mappy (1983)
- Motos (1985)
- Ms. Pac-Man (1982)
- Rally-X (1980)
- Xevious (1983)

Officially, both of these follow-ups required Windows 95 or later, though the demo for Return of Arcade is a 16-bit program that requires only WinG to run in Windows 3.1. This game will not work on 64-bit versions of Windows.

Next Generation criticized the PC version of the game, stating that "(with the exception of Mrs. Pac-Man) all these games are sort of past their sell-by date, and you have an unmitigated disaster, callously cashing in on people's misremembered childhood memories."

== Reception ==
Computer Gaming World in 1993 stated that Microsoft Arcade's adaptation of the five games was "nearly flawless". It favorably cited the many hints and strategies included in WinHelp files for the games, and the boss key. The magazine liked Battlezone the most out of the five games in Microsoft Arcade, but stated that "it's been done better since" by games like Spectre. Despite finding that the games were "made obsolete by technology", it predicted that Arcade would be very successful because of nostalgia, and wished that Microsoft would have updated the games with modern graphics and gameplay. Microsoft Arcade was named the best computer arcade game of 1993 by Computer Games Strategy Plus.

In the United States, Return of Arcade debuted in position 16 on PC Data's computer game sales rankings for April 1996. It rose to 10th place the following month, and continued to chart in the top 10 through August, peaking at #5. The game's streak in the top 20 held through November, but ended with a fall from the charts in December. According to PC Data, Return of Arcade was the eighth-best-selling computer game in the United States for 1996 overall, after claiming 16th in the rankings for the first half of the year. PC Data reported the game's sales at 335,176 units that year, which earned revenues of $9.5 million.

== See also ==
- Microsoft Entertainment Pack
- Microsoft Entertainment Pack: The Puzzle Collection
- Microsoft Pinball Arcade
- Game Room
- List of Bandai Namco video game compilations
