= I, Robot (video game) =

1984 video game

- North American arcade flyer
- Developer: Atari, Inc.
- Publishers: Atari, Inc.
- Designer: Dave Theurer
- Programmers: Dave Theurer; Rusty Dawe
- Platform: Arcade
- Release: NA: June 28, 1984; UK: March 1985
- Genre: Action
- Modes: Single-player, multiplayer

I, Robot is an action video game designed by Dave Theurer of Atari, Inc.. It was released by Atari as an arcade video game in 1984. The player assumes the role of "Unhappy Interface Robot #1984", a servant bot that rebels against Big Brother. The goal is to turn red squares to blue to destroy Big Brother's shield and eye. In addition to the main game, there is a non-game drawing mode, Doodle City, which can be used for three minutes.

I, Robot was the first arcade video game to be rendered entirely with 3D polygon graphics at runtime. Some earlier 3D games used vector graphics instead of rasterized polygons, such as Atari's Tempest from 1981, also by Theurer. Funai's laserdisc game Interstellar (1983) had previously used pre-rendered 3D graphics, and Simutrek's Cube Quest (1983) used real-time 3D graphics combined with laserdisc full-motion video backgrounds. I, Robot was also the first video game with camera-control options.

The game received mixed reception and was a financial flop. Approximately 750–1000 arcade machines were manufactured, with few having been confirmed to exist today. The remaining cabinets have become collectibles. I, Robot was retrospectively praised for its innovative 3D graphics, and author David Ellis listed it as one of the "notable classics" of its time.

I, Robot and Return of the Jedi were the last two arcade games from Atari, Inc., before the company was split up and the arcade division renamed to Atari Games. In 2022, the game was included as part of the Atari 50 compilation, marking its first re-release.

== Gameplay ==
"Unhappy Interface Robot #1984" walks on squares to change them from red to blue and destroy Big Brother's shield and eye.

In I, Robot, the player controls "Unhappy Interface Robot #1984", a servant robot who has become self-aware and decides to rebel against Big Brother. To advance from level to level, the robot must destroy the giant blinking eye of Big Brother, first by wearing down its shield and then attacking the eye directly. The robot fires energy at the shield by moving over red blocks in the level, converting them to blue.

Although the robot can jump, it is destroyed if jumping while the eye is open. Various extra hazards, such as birds, bombs and flying sharks, can also destroy the robot during each level. At the end of some levels, rather than destroying the eye immediately, the robot must navigate a maze and collect gems before it encounters the eye at close range. Once a level is completed, the robot flies through outer space and must shoot or avoid "tetras", meteors, and various obstacles (including a floating head that fires nails) to reach the next level.

The player can adjust the camera angle during gameplay, moving closer to the robot or flying up for an overhead view of the level. The closer the camera is to the robot, the greater the score multiplier, but the more difficult it is to see the whole level and Big Brother. In later levels, enemies known as "viewer killers" begin attacking the camera directly, forcing the player to either change the viewing angle or move the robot so that the camera will follow it. Failing to avoid a viewer killer costs the player a life.

There are 26 unique levels; after completing all of them, the levels repeat at a higher difficulty and with a different color palette, as in Atari's earlier game Tempest. After completing a total of 126 levels, the player is thrown back to a random earlier level. The game ends when the player runs out of lives.

=== Doodle City ===
Doodle City, referred to in the game as an ungame, is a simple drawing tool which presents the player with a selection of objects from the "game" mode. The player can move and rotate each shape and can cause trails to be left on the screen as they are moved. The player can remain in this mode for up to three minutes per credit, and can switch back to the main game at any time. One life is subtracted from the player's life pool for each minute spent in Doodle City.

== Development ==
The game uses raster graphics, displayed on a 19-inch color CRT monitor, and a Motorola 6809 central processing unit. The amplified stereophonic sound is driven by four POKEY audio chips. Dave Sherman developed the custom bit-slice ('pepperoni') 3D co-processor that allowed for a throughput of approximately 2,000 polygons per second; it includes four AMD 2901 4-bit slice programmable ALU chips. The game's name was originally Ice Castles.

I, Robot uses the same upright cabinet as Atari's Firefox laserdisc game. It has an Atari-patented Hall-effect joystick, two fire buttons, and two buttons to control the player's viewing angle.

The gameplay borrowed features from earlier arcade games such as Galaga (1981) and Pac-Man (1980). The game's release was delayed due to technical issues and difficulties, so it was returned to the lab for further testing and research, and was not fully released until June 1984.

== Reception ==
Approximately 750–1,000 units of I, Robot were created; few have been confirmed to exist today. The arcade cabinets have since become rare collectibles, with Dave Theurer's involvement being a selling point among collectors.

The arcade game received mixed reviews upon release. Play Meter published two reviews in its December 1984 issue. Gene Lewin rated the dedicated arcade cabinet 2 out of 10, but raised it to 7 if released as a conversion kit. The review praised the "unusual" colorful graphics and originality, but said "it lacks the excitement necessary to make it a top earning game" and that an "average player will not be very interested in I, Robot." Roger C. Sharpe rated it three hashes, with praise for the "new 3-D raster video animation system" and execution, stating it "won't be a sure-fire sensation, but it does exhibit "sleeper" qualities." Clare Edgeley of Computer and Video Games magazine reviewed the game in March 1985, stating that the "graphics are perhaps the most unusual of any arcade game around" but is nevertheless "a cubist's delight." She also said the ability to change angles is a "nice" touch. In 1991, Mean Machines placed it on its wishlist for arcade games to appear on consoles, believing the Super Famicom would do that game justice. In 2001, author John Sellers described I, Robot as a "near miss" because of its strong release that didn't gain enough popularity. He further praised the game, calling it enjoyable and influential.

Author David Ellis in 2004 listed it as one of the "notable classics" of its time, calling it "quirky". In 2008, Guinness World Records Gamer's Edition listed it as the number ninety arcade game in technical, creative and cultural impact, citing its innovative 3D graphics. Gamasutra placed I, Robot on its "20 Atari Games" list, saying that "This is the kind of brilliance Atari could field in its halcyon days". The game has been cited as the first arcade game to use 3D filled-polygon graphics, and holds a Guinness World Record for the milestone. IGN.com's Levi Buchanan and Craig Harris included I Robot to their "Dream Arcades" articles.

A rumor persisted that Atari shipped 500 unsold units to Japan with instructions to dump the units into the ocean at the halfway point. Atari employee Rusty Dawe dispelled this rumor as a "total myth" in a 2009 interview, adding "I would have LIKED to dump [the] I, Robot controls into the ocean [as they were a] total nightmare. But that didn't happen either."

== Legacy ==
A remake of the game was announced on February 12, 2025 and released on April 17, 2025 for Windows, Atari VCS, Nintendo Switch, PlayStation 4, PlayStation 5, PlayStation VR2, and Xbox Series X and Series S. It was developed by Llamasoft, whose founder, Jeff Minter, worked with Atari in the past.
