= Sente =

Sente may refer to:

- Sente, a strategic concept in the game of Go
- Sente is the first player in Shogi; in English lingo it is considered Black
- Sente (software), academic reference manager for Mac OS X
- Sente Technologies, arcade game developer from the mid-1980s
- One-hundredth of the Lesotho loti
