= Megapede =

1983 video game

- Publisher(s): Softek
- Programmer(s): Andrew Beale
- Platform(s): ZX Spectrum
- Release: 1983
- Genre(s): Fixed shooter

Megapede is a Centipede clone for the ZX Spectrum programmed by Andrew Beale and published by Softek in 1983. Beale also wrote a Berzerk clone, Robon, for the Spectrum.

== Reception ==

CRASH magazine: "Softek’s version of the noble creepy-crawlie game is just about as good as any. Here the scorpion lends to drop fleas rather as though they were bombs, which makes an interesting variation. Machine Code, nice graphics, nine skill levels. Good".
