= Stocker (video game) =

1984 video game

- Developer: Bally Sente
- Publisher: Bally Sente
- Designer: Dennis Koble
- Programmer: Dennis Koble
- Artist: Gary Johnson
- Composer: Jesse Osborne
- Platforms: Arcade, Commodore 64
- Release: 1984: Arcade; 1988: C64
- Modes: Single-player, multiplayer
- Arcade system: Sente Arcade Computer I

Stocker is a top-down racing game released in arcades in North America in 1984 by Bally Sente. Capcom published a port for the Commodore 64 in 1988.

== Gameplay ==
The arcade version in attract mode

The player controls a stock racing car and must be the first to win a cross-country road race.

== Reception ==
Earl Buckelew wrote in Compute!'s Gazette: "while it's designed with younger players in mind, Stocker has enough thrills to provide the rest of us with hours of fun. With skill and determination, you may even see the checkered flag in California."

Bill Kunkel for Ahoy! wrote, "Stocker is a quaint game, almost like an antique that's been painfully restored using state-of-the-art techniques."

Paul A. Hughes for Info wrote, "The whole game is simple, including the graphics, sound, and game play. You will probably play this game a few times and then put it away."

Scott Wasser for Run magazine wrote, "at home, where only boredom limits the number of times a game can be played, Stocker reaches that limit fairly quickly. So, unless you're someone who couldn't get enough of Stocker in the arcades, I'd recommend you save your software quarters for something else."

== Legacy ==
The game was referenced in the 1986 film The Color of Money.
