= Arcade's Greatest Hits: The Atari Collection 1 =

1996 video game compilation

- North American PlayStation box art
- Developer: Digital Eclipse
- Publishers: NA: Midway; EU: GT Interactive
- Series: Arcade's Greatest Hits
- Platforms: PlayStation, Sega Saturn, Super NES
- Release: PlayStation: NA: December 20, 1996; Saturn: NA: July 7, 1997; Super NES: NA: August 20, 1997
- Genre: Various
- Modes: Single-player, multiplayer

Arcade's Greatest Hits: The Atari Collection 1 is a 1996 compilation of Atari arcade games, published by Midway Games for the Sega Saturn, PlayStation, and Super Nintendo Entertainment System. It is a successor volume to Williams Arcade's Greatest Hits. The Saturn and PlayStation versions of the game include an FMV documentary on the "Golden Age of Atari", featuring video interviews with the programmers behind the six games in the compilation. The later Super NES version was announced by Midway as their final release for any "16-bit" console.

== Games ==
The compilation includes the following games, all of which were licensed from Atari Corporation. All of the games except Battlezone can be played in two-player mode, where both players alternate turns.

- Asteroids (1979)
- Battlezone (1980)
- Centipede (1981)
- Missile Command (1980)
- Super Breakout (1978)
- Tempest (1981)

== Reception ==
Reception

Review scores
Publication	Score
Electronic Gaming Monthly	6.5/10, 5.5/10, 5.0/10, 5.5/10 (PS1)
GameSpot	6.9/10 (PS1, SAT)
Next Generation	4/5 (PS1)

Critics praised the compilation's use of emulation to exactly recreate the games' arcade versions, the menu system, and the documentary FMVs. A reviewer for Next Generation elaborated that "Unlike the Williams disc ... the history is narrated over a slideshow of memorabilia, and the insightful clips run longer, dispelling ancient rumors and relating anecdotes of Atari coin-op's golden age." Most also applauded the selection of games as consisting almost entirely of classics which remained enjoyable in spite of the gaming industry's advances over the years. However, reviews generally criticized that the standard PlayStation gamepad does not work well with the games in the collection, particular those which used paddle controllers and trackballs when they were originally released, though the PlayStation Mouse is supported and was considered a better option. Tom Ham summarized in GameSpot, "Bringing together six classic games that launched entire video game genres (and stole countless quarters from gamers), The Atari Collection 1 is a wonderful trip down memory lane." Electronic Gaming Monthly's review team focused more on the controller issues, and had a less enthusiastic reaction overall. GamePro similarly concluded, "Even though the authentic graphics and gameplay rate high, the limitations in control and sound bring down the overall enjoyment."

== See also ==
- Arcade's Greatest Hits: The Atari Collection 2
