= Repulsar =

1983 video game

- Developer: Andrew Beale
- Publisher: Softek
- Platform: ZX Spectrum
- Release: EU: 1983
- Genre: Shoot 'em up

Repulsar is a ZX Spectrum video game programmed by Andrew Beale and published by Softek in 1983. It is a clone of the 1980 Atari, Inc. arcade game Missile Command.

== Reception ==
"This is Softek’s version of missile defence and it is a close copy of the original. Its graphics are nowhere near as good as Ocean’s ‘Armageddon’. On the other hand, it does have the extra feature of plenty of enemy planes buzzing around to destroy as well as the missiles, themselves and the explosions are satisfactory. It is also faster to play than Ocean's version, but somehow less fun"

In-game screenshot
