= Tubeway =

1982 video game

- Developer: Datamost
- Publisher: Datamost
- Programmer: David Arthur Van Brink
- Platform: Apple II
- Release: 1982
- Genre: Tube shooter
- Mode: Single-player

Tubeway (sometimes stylized as Tubeway ][) is a video game for the Apple II programmed by David Arthur Van Brink and published by Datamost in 1983. It is similar to the 1981 Atari arcade game Tempest.

== Gameplay ==
The third level

Tubeway is a tube shooter in which the player uses paddles to move a small white crosshair around the top of a "tube" or wall while firing down at the computer-controlled opponents attempting to scale their way up it. The opponents, known as the Tubeway Army (one of several references to Gary Numan in the game), consist of triangular green homers (100 points) and triangular blue seekers (200 points), both of which can return fire. A special opponent called the germ occasionally emerges from a white box in the lower left corner of the screen. The goal of the game is to clear as many levels as possible before running out of lives. An extra life is granted every 20,000 points.

== Reception ==
In an 8 out of 10 review, the January 1983 Arcade Express newsletter mentioned the similarity to Tempest, but called it "just different enough to stand as an independent program within the same gaming genre."

In 1984, Softline readers named Tubeway the sixth-worst Apple program of 1983.

== See also ==
- Axis Assassin, another Tempest-inspired game for the Apple II
