= Dona Bailey =

American video game programmer (born 1955)

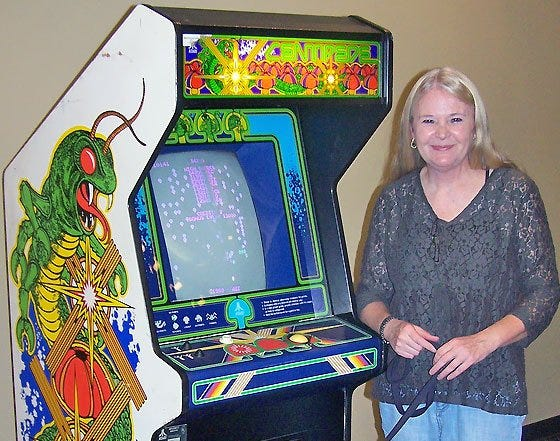
- Born: 1955 (age 70–71); Little Rock, Arkansas, U.S.
- Education: University of Arkansas at Little Rock
- Occupations: Video game programmer Educator
- Notable work: Centipede

Dona Bailey (born 1955) is an American video game programmer and educator. Bailey, along with Ed Logg, developed Atari, Inc.'s 1981 arcade video game Centipede.

== Early life and education ==
Dona Bailey was born in 1955 in Little Rock, Arkansas. She graduated high school early and started attending the University of Arkansas at Little Rock at the age of 16. She accelerated her education by taking classes year-round, and by the age of 19, she graduated with a bachelor's degree in Psychology with three minors in English, Math and Biology. She continued her education by earning a master's degree in Math.

== Career ==
Bailey was hired by General Motors as a programmer in 1978 and trained in 6502 assembly language programming. She worked there for two years on displays, and microprocessor-based cruise control systems. Bailey's first exposure to video games came from when she first heard the song "Space Invader" by The Pretenders. A friend told her the song was inspired by the arcade video game Space Invaders. After becoming interested in what a video game was, her friend took her to a nearby bar which had a Space Invaders arcade cabinet. Bailey noticed that the display on Space Invaders resembled the display she worked with on the Cadillac at GM. She later found out that Atari was using the same microprocessor in its games. This inspired her to leave GM and move to Sunnyvale, California with the intention of working for Atari.

=== Atari, Inc. ===
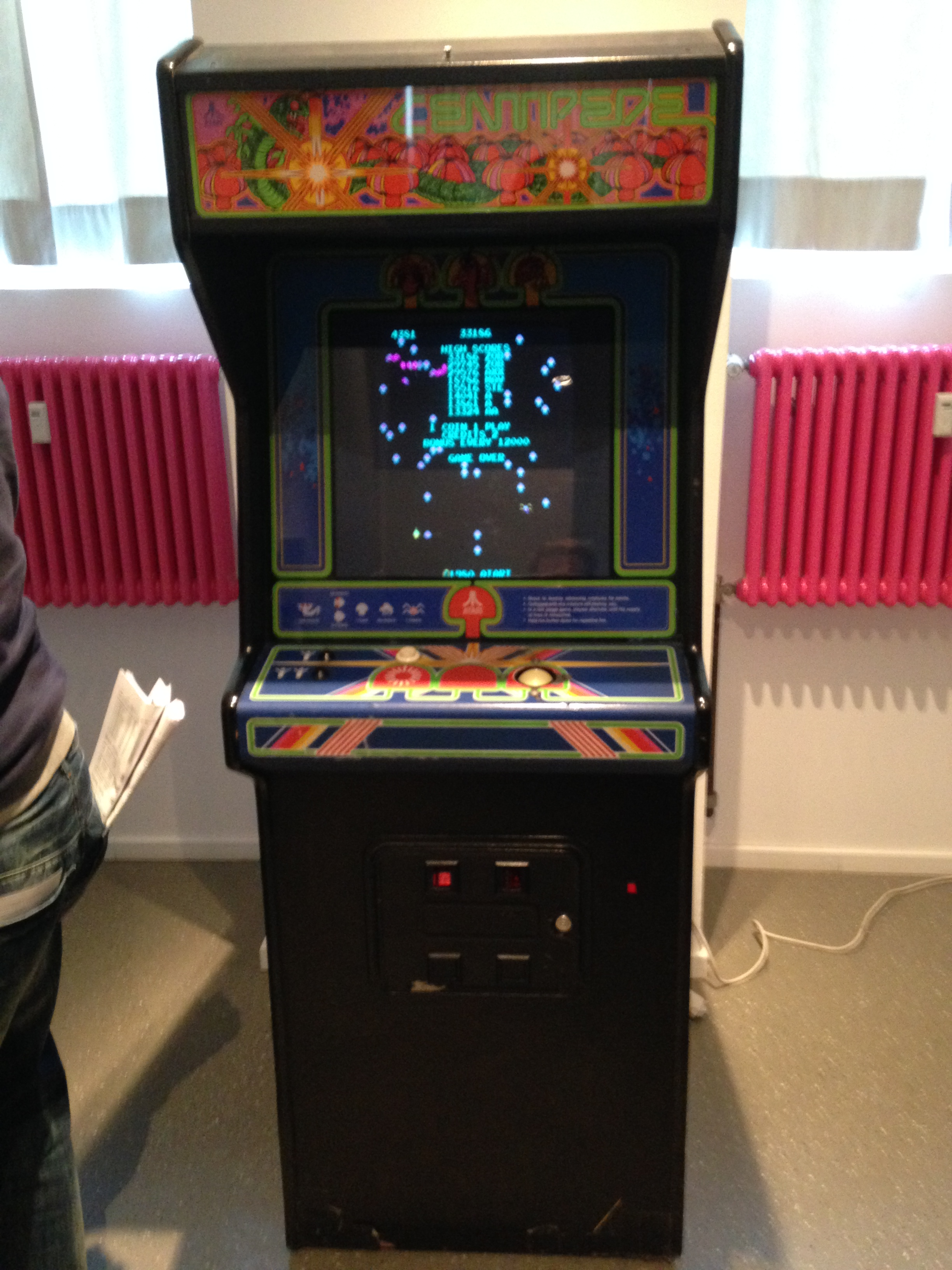
An upright Centipede arcade cabinet showing the trackball controller.

In 1980, Bailey joined Atari, Inc.'s coin-op division, where she was the only woman. In an interview, Bailey recalled that Atari had a notebook of possible game ideas at the time. Of the 30 or so entries, the only one without "lasering or frying things" was a short description of a bug winding down the screen. She said, "It didn't seem bad to shoot a bug." Within a four-person team, she became the software developer and software engineer on Centipede. Ed Logg, a supervisor at Atari at the time, assigned Bailey to do the programming on Centipede. Logg said he worked on the game's design, while Bailey did "about half the programming". Centipede went on to become Atari's second best-selling coin-op game. Due to the game's popularity, Atari's production line was forced to run two shifts to keep up with demand.

Centipede was also one of the first coin-op based arcade machines to have a significant female player base. This was intentional, as Logg and Bailey designed the game to appeal to a broad audience, not just male players. The game's vibrant pastel colors and the trackball-based gameplay appealed to both male and female players. Centipede’s unique color palette is credited to Bailey. While most games used bright colors, Bailey chose a pastel color palette for Centipede, which was caused by a happy accident when the game’s technician was making adjustments to the game. Bailey said, "I was in front of the cabinet, watching the changes that were cycling through on the screen as he worked. Suddenly the regular primary colors on the screen changed to hot and vivid pastel colors I had never seen before, and I made a yip of approval and asked our technician to keep those colors." After Centipede, Bailey was working on a game titled "Weather War", but since processors at the time were so limited, she was unable to make the game include everything she wanted. Bailey left Atari before the game was finished.

=== After Atari ===
Bailey left Atari in 1982 and went to work at Videa (later renamed Sente Technologies), founded by three former Atari employees. During her time at Videa, one of the games she worked on that never made it past the prototype phase, was a game that she called “The Glass Bead Game”, named after the Hermann Hesse novel by the same name. She later took PC contract roles for Activision, working on a two-person game with Paul Allen Newell. In 1985, after she left Activision, she decided to leave the video game industry altogether.

In 1997, Bailey moved back to Arkansas to take care of her aging parents. At 48 years old, Bailey earned two more master's degrees. Her second master's degree is in Education in Instructional Design, and her third master's degree is in Professional and Technical Writing. In 2007, she was the keynote speaker at the Women in Games International Conference.

In 2008, Bailey joined the faculty in the department of Rhetoric and Writing at the University of Arkansas at Little Rock where she taught until her retirement. In addition to writing classes, Bailey taught multimedia classes and the software 3ds Max.

=== Recent years ===
In April 2013, Dona Bailey was a guest speaker at Indie Tech Talk, a lecture series presented by the Game Innovation Lab at the NYU Tandon School of Engineering. In September 2015, she was a guest speaker at The Venture Center in Little Rock, Arkansas at their monthly technical speaker event, Code•IT! In November 2018, Dona Bailey was an honored guest speaker alongside Bonnie Ross, Brenda Laurel, Megan Gaiser, Amy Hennig, Susan Jaekel, Jen MacLean, Sheri Graner Ray, and Victoria Van Voorhis at the "Women in Games: Inspire!" panel, as part of the first annual "Women in Games" exhibit at The Strong National Museum of Play in Rochester, New York. The panel was the opening event for the exhibit which celebrates the contributions of women in the video game industry.

As of 2019, Bailey has written a screenplay titled Sunnyvale based on her experiences at Atari as a programmer on Centipede, and is trying to get it picked up. She is also currently writing scripts for other narrative projects.

== Awards ==
In 2013, she was the recipient of the Women in Gaming Lifetime Achievement Award.
