= Friendlyware =

FriendlyWare was a set of 30 computer programs that were written in BASIC. There were several releases of FriendlyWare. A review of some its software appeared in the April 1983 issue of PC World magazine.

== Reception and distribution ==
These programs, which were bundled with some IBM personal computers sold by hardware vendors, included computer games, business software and personal data analysis programs.

The original copy, titled FriendlyWare I, was distributed on a 5.25" floppy disk with a green label. It had one arcade game (Brick Out) and other family software, including strategy games like Reversi. The FriendlyWare PC Introductory Set was among the first games available for the PC. It was a best seller for three months with little competition. The FriendlyWare Arcade pack came on a floppy disk with a red label and contained eight additional arcade-style games. The BusinessWare release came with a blue label and contained simple business software.

FriendlyWare was published in 1983 by a company named Friendlysoft. Over 29,000 copies of the original FriendlyWare were eventually sold.

== FriendlySoft ==
FriendlySoft was started by Michael Yaw, an investor who also owned several Domino's Pizza stores. The software was written by a team of four programmers; who were paid royalties on the sales. Development was completed on some of the earlier IBM PCs. One of these computers was a PC with an innovative CGA card (Color Graphics Adapter).

== Cultural impact ==
FriendlyWare was briefly referenced in Homestar Runner's "Strong Bad Email #65", with a subsequent playthrough of a number of the games in "Disk 4 of 12 - FriendlyWare". and on "Disk 4 of 12 - Friendlyware Attendum",

FriendlyWare was one of the first pieces of software to implement a boss key, a shortcut to obscure the nature of the software from superiors in the workplace, Enhancements to this feature were still noteworthy in 2014.
