= Arcade Classics =

1996 video game

- Mega Drive box art
- Developers: Al Baker & Associates
- Publisher: Sega
- Programmers: Al Baker; Nathan Baker
- Composer: Matt Scott
- Platforms: Genesis/Mega Drive, Game Gear
- Release: Genesis: NA: July 1996; EU: July 19, 1996; Game Gear: NA: 1996
- Genres: Action, shoot 'em up
- Modes: Single-player, multiplayer

Arcade Classics is a Genesis/Mega Drive compilation of three Atari, Inc. arcade video games: Pong (1972), Missile Command (1980), and Centipede (1981), plus a revised version of each one. It was published in 1996 by Sega. A version was also released for the Game Gear, with Ultrapong replacing Pong.

== Reception ==
Reception

Review scores
Publication	Score
Electronic Gaming Monthly	3.875 out of 10 (GEN)
Next Generation	1/5 (GEN)
Fort Worth Star-Telegram	1/5

Arcade Classics was panned by critics. Reviews commented that Arcade Classics includes very few games compared to other retro compilations, that it fails to recreate the experience the games offered in the arcades, that the "enhanced" versions offer nothing but mild cosmetic changes, and that the overly "busy" backgrounds in the enhanced version of Centipede interfere with the gameplay.
