= Sente Technologies =

American video game company

- Industry: Arcade video games
- Founded: 1982; 44 years ago (as Videa)
- Defunct: 1988
- Fate: Bankruptcy
- Headquarters: Originally Milpitas, California, later Sunnyvale, California, U.S.
- Key people: Roger Hector (co-founder); Wendi Allen (co-founder); Ed Rotberg (co-founder); Nolan Bushnell (chairman); Owen Rubin (game designer); Dona Bailey (game programmer)
- Products: Snake Pit, Stocker, Hat Trick, Street Football

Sente Technologies (also known as Bally Sente, Inc.) was an arcade game company. Founded as Videa in 1982 by ex-Atari employees Roger Hector, Wendi Allen (formerly Howard Delman), and Ed Rotberg, the company was bought by Nolan Bushnell and made a division of his Pizza Time Theatre company in 1983. In 1984 the division was acquired by Bally Midway who continued to operate it until closing it down in 1988. The name Sente, like Atari, is another reference to Bushnell's favorite game, Go and means "having the initiative."

== Videa ==
Videa developed their first games, Gridlee (a.k.a. Pogoz, an arcade game), Lasercade (for the Atari 2600) and Atom Smasher (a.k.a. Meltdown, also for the Atari 2600) in 1982 with the intent of entering both the arcade and home console market in 1983. An attempt was made to get Gottlieb to distribute Gridlee and Fox to release Lasercade and Atom Smasher (also known as Meltdown) but all three failed to come to market. The console market crashed in Christmas of 1983 and the prototype Gridlee machine did poorly out on its field test so Gottlieb and Fox both passed on their respective deals.

== Sente Technologies ==
Shortly thereafter Videa was acquired by Nolan Bushnell's Chuck E. Cheese's Pizza Time Theatre company. Bushnell had left Atari (a company he co-founded) in 1978 and was required to sign a non-competitive agreement to keep him out of the video game business for several years. He hoped to use Videa as a way to re-enter the arcade game market quickly without having to start a company from the ground up since his agreement was set to expire in late 1983. The intent to acquire Videa for $2.2 million was published in January 1983 and Sente Technologies was officially founded on October 1, 1983.

Although Sente did not officially exist until October, Atari sued Bushnell anyway, claiming his April purchase of the company broke their non-compete agreement. The suit was quickly put aside when Bushnell arranged a licensing deal with Atari, granting them exclusive rights to home releases of Sente's arcade games. Ultimately, only Hat Trick would be released for the Atari 7800 in 1987.

Now a division of Pizza Time Theatres, they further developed the Gridlee prototype hardware to create the Sente Arcade Computer I and II systems. The SAC-I was novel for being one of the first arcade systems to use interchangeable "cartridges" (really just bare PCBs with finger holes cut into them for easy removal) and quick swap control panels inside a durable steel-framed generic cabinet to allow operators to quickly and cheaply convert arcades from one game to another. This would become common practice some years later but was rare for 1984 (a similar concept from the era is Data East's DECO Cassette System). Three options were available to operators over the company's life: A large metal and plastic dedicated cabinet, a more standard wooden dedicated cabinet, and a conversion kit for existing machines. Some titles were also offered in cocktail cabinets but they don't appear to have been available for all titles.

In addition to developing the Sente Arcade Computer, Sente also manufactured at least 240 Skee-Ball-type machines for Pizza Time Theater starting in 1982. Named Rollerbowl, it premiered during the IAAPA Expo in 1982. It also appeared at the Amusement Operators Expo in Chicago in 1983. It had a brief announcement in an issue of Cash Box earlier that same year. It was also the cover story in an undated 'The Games Examiner' newsletter, a Pizza Time Theater Company's newsletter, around the same time. In that same newsletter, it explained that the machine was similar to the pre-existing skee-ball game 'Chuck E. Cheese Roll', which had previously only been available to corporate owned Pizza Time Theater locations.

Sente's first video arcade game, Snake Pit was demonstrated in December 1983 and the SAC-II system and Shrike Avenger was previewed at the same event. Snake Pit started shipping soon after but only a limited number of machines were sold before Sente had to stop distribution. The Pizza Time Theatre chain was suffering from financial problems because of its recent expansion and acquisitions phase. After operating Sente Technologies for less than five months Pizza Time Theatre Inc. filed for bankruptcy and the Sente division was put up for sale. Bally Manufacturing purchased the division for $3.9 million in May 1984 and renamed it Bally Sente.

== Bally Sente ==
While the company had halted the release of Snake Pit during the period between the Pizza Time Theatre bankruptcy and the finalization of their sale to Bally they continued to develop additional titles. Once production was started back up they released a number of titles that year, including: Snake Pit, Stocker, several editions of Trivial Pursuit and Hat Trick, their best selling title. Bally Sente released a large number of games for the SAC-I system between 1984 and 1987 and developed at least one title, Shrike Avenger, for the SAC-II system. While Sente had originally focused on the ability to easily convert existing cabinets to new releases, which centered around their original metal framed and plastic bodied cabinet, Bally was much less interested in the feature. Many of the expensive original model cabinets were returned to Sente after Pizza Time's bankruptcy. Operators were concerned the company would not resume production and they would be left with an expensive cabinet that would not have any additional games released for it. This allowed them to recover the cost in case Sente closed down completely. When cabinet production resumed under Bally it focused on standard wooden upright cabinets and standard cocktail cabinets because of their reduced cost. Also, the original cartridge-based game board system that enclosed the game's PCB inside a large cartridge was replaced with cheaper bare PCB designs that were less expensive to produce. Sente's games were never huge sellers and releases slowed down considerably as the years passed.

=== Last projects ===
The premier SAC-II game, Shrike Avenger, had been in development for three years but a complete game was still months away. Bally Sente replaced the original developer with Owen Rubin and gave him six weeks to make a playable game out of the unfinished prototype. While the arcade cabinet and motion control computer were complete and in-game graphics were nearly done the game itself was unfinished. Rubin quickly developed a playable "Last Starfigher" trainer type flight simulator and the game was put out on field tests. The game used a standard SAC-1 system connected to a powerful Motorola 68000 based motion control computer for motion feedback through the motorized environmental flight simulator cabinet. It earned very well on field tests but had some major problems. Patrons complained of dizziness (some even became ill), the motors were prone to burning out and one units safety system failed, tipping the unit over, dumping a patron on the floor and almost crushing them. Bally deemed the SAC-2 system too expensive to produce (estimated to be $10k a unit in 1986 dollars, easily five times a typical games price) and a possible liability so the project was canceled.

A prototype of Shrike Avenger appeared at London's Amusement Trades Exhibition International (ATEI) show in early 1986. The game was well received at the show for its motion simulator cabinet, drawing comparisons to Sega's Space Harrier (1985) which was featured at the same show. Clare Edgeley of Computer and Video Games hailed both Space Harrier and Shrike Avengers as "crowd stoppers" due to their motion cockpit cabinets and she said they may have both stolen the show; Nintendo's Super Mario Bros. (1985) made its European debut at the same show, but did not draw as much attention as Space Harrier or Shrike Avenger.

Sente's last project was the Sente Super System, also known as SAC-III. Based around a Commodore Amiga 500 computer the system was intended to provide a powerful and cheap way for operators to upgrade existing arcades to more modern hardware but was also planned to be sold as standalone units. Moonquake was the premier title for the system but for unknown reasons the Sente Super System was canceled and it never went into full production. Bally Sente filed for bankruptcy and folded up soon after. All assets were transferred to Bally's Midway division in 1988. Sente was known for producing a rather odd assortment of games over its tenure as well as using some unique control schemes.

Some of the company's games featured "missing children" ads in their attract modes, an uncommon feature in arcade games. The bulletins were programmed onto a chip that could be switched in less than half an hour, which would allow for the notices to be regularly updated; however, arcades rarely changed out the chips because Sente sold complete cabinets rather than individual components like the chip.

== Games ==
- Chicken Shift (1984)
- Euro Stocker (prototype)
- Gimme A Break (1985, a pool game unrelated to the sitcom of the same name)
- Goalie Ghost (1984)
- Grudge Match (prototype, released in Italy by Playtronic)
- Hat Trick (1987, a hockey game, ported to the Commodore 64 and MS-DOS by Capcom, then the Atari 7800 by ibid inc.)
- Moonquake (Sente Super System prototype)
- Name that Tune (1986, based on the game show of the same name)
- Night Stocker (1986, a sequel to Stocker with a first-person perspective and a light gun to shoot at enemies)
- Off the Wall (1984, not related to the Atari 2600 game with the same title or the later arcade game with the same title)
- Rescue Raider (1987)
- Rollerbowl (1982, a skee-ball redemption game)
- Sente Mini Golf (1985)
- Shrike Avenger (SAC-II prototype)
- Snacks 'n Jaxson (1984)
- Snake Pit (1984)
- Spiker (1986, a volleyball game)
- Stocker (1984, a top-down racing game, ported to MS-DOS and Commodore 64 by Capcom)
- Stompin' (1986, a game where the player steps on nine floor pads to kill bugs on the screen)
- Street Football (1986)
- Team Hat Trick (prototype, 15 playtest cocktail cabinets produced)
- Toggle (prototype)
- Trick Shot (prototype)
- Trivial Pursuit: All Star Sports Edition (1984)
- Trivial Pursuit: Baby Boomer Edition (1984)
- Trivial Pursuit: Think Tank Genus Edition (1984)
- Trivial Pursuit: Genus II Edition (1984)
- Trivial Pursuit: Young Player's Edition (1984)
- Trivial Pursuit: Volumen I (1987, Spanish, licensed to Maibesa)
- Trivial Pursuit: Volumen II (1987, Spanish, licensed to Maibesa)
- Trivial Pursuit: Volumen III (1987, Spanish, licensed to Maibesa)
- Trivial Pursuit: Volumen IV (1988, Spanish, licensed to Maibesa, runs on different arcade hardware)
- Trivial Pursuit: Volumen V (1988, Spanish, licensed to Maibesa, runs on different arcade hardware)

== Legacy ==
Another game on the SAC-I hardware, called Rescue Raider, was released in 1987. Although the game runs on the SAC-I hardware, it was released by Bally Midway, not Bally Sente. In 1989, Bally Midway released the sequel to Sente Mini Golf, called Mini Golf Deluxe. It was released as part of the collection Tri-Sports, which also included a bowling game called Power Strike and a pool game called Pool Shark.

A ROM image of Gridlee had been released as a free download on MAME's website.
