= Axis Assassin =

1983 video game

- Original "album cover" box
- Developer: Electronic Arts
- Publishers: NA: Electronic Arts; EU: Ariolasoft
- Designer: John Field
- Platforms: Apple II, Atari 8-bit, Commodore 64
- Release: Atari 8-bit, C64: NA: November 1983; Apple II: NA: 1983
- Genre: Tube shooter
- Mode: Single-player

Axis Assassin is a 1983 tube shooter video game written by John Field and published by Electronic Arts for the Apple II. Ports for Atari 8-bit computers and Commodore 64 were released alongside the Apple II original. The game is similar in concept and visuals to Atari's 1981 game Tempest.

Along with M.U.L.E., Hard Hat Mack, Archon: The Light and the Dark, and Worms?, Axis Assassin was one of the first five games published by Electronic Arts. Field is included in the two-page "We See Farther" magazine ad from 1983 that positioned EA's game developers as "rock stars." Field also wrote The Last Gladiator for Electronic Arts, which was published the same year as Axis Assassin.

== Development ==
John Field wrote the initial Apple II version of Axis Assassin in two weeks while on vacation in Wisconsin, then improved it over the next seven months.

== Reception ==
Title screen with John Field's signature

Reviewing the Apple II version for Electronic Games in 1983, Arnie Katz wrote, "if John Field's Axis Assassin is a true foretaste of what we can expect from Electronic Arts, then there's no question that computer gaming has gained another first-rate software producer." Katz and cohort Bill Kunkel also discussed the game in the "Arcade Alley" column of Video, stating, "Axis Assassin...has only one discernable problem: its name. Despite the obvious and misleading connotations of 'Axis,' this is a semi-abstract target-shoot in the Tempest genre–not a World War II spy adventure."

A review in Computer and Video Games magazine three years after the game's release was less enthusiastic, concluding "there's nothing really wrong with Axis Assassin, but there's no real reason why anybody should make time to play it."

== See also ==
- Tubeway
