= Tempest (video game) =

1981 video game

- North American arcade flyer
- Developer: Atari, Inc.
- Publishers: Atari, Inc.
- Designer: Dave Theurer
- Programmer: Dave Theurer
- Platforms: Arcade, BBC Micro, Acorn Electron, Amstrad CPC, ZX Spectrum, Atari ST
- Release: October 1981: Arcade; NA: October 1981 BBC Micro, Electron; UK: 1985 CPC, ZX Spectrum; UK: 1987 Atari ST; UK: 1989
- Genre: Tube shooter
- Modes: Single-player, multiplayer

Tempest is a 1981 tube shooter developed and published by Atari, Inc. as an arcade video game. It was designed and programmed by Dave Theurer. It takes place on a three-dimensional surface divided into lanes, sometimes as a closed tube, and viewed from one end. The player controls a claw-shaped "blaster" that sits on the edge of the surface, snapping from segment to segment as a rotary knob is turned, and can fire shots to destroy enemies and obstacles by pressing a button.

Tempest was one of the first games to use Atari's Color-QuadraScan vector display technology. It was also the first to let players choose their starting level (a system Atari called "SkillStep"). This feature increases the preferred starting level, which could also be used to let the player continue the previous game if they wished. Tempest was one of the first video games that had a progressive level design where the levels themselves varied rather than repeating the same layout with increasing difficulty.

== Gameplay ==
The arcade version with the player's lane in yellow and three red flippers moving along the rim

The goal in Tempest is to survive and score as many points as possible, by clearing the screen of enemies that appear on the playing field. The player controls an articulating, claw-shaped ship at the near end of the field (referred to as a "blaster", or in some sources as the "Live Wire"), moving it left and right using a rotary knob. The player can rapid-fire shots down individual lanes of the field, destroying any enemies or projectiles within the same lane. The blaster is also equipped with a "Superzapper" which, once per level, destroys all enemies currently on the field. A second use of the Superzapper in the same level destroys one random enemy. The Superzapper is recharged between each level.

The game features sixteen unique levels of different shapes, including geometric shapes, a flat line, and the symbol for infinity. Some levels are closed tubes that allow the player to loop throughout it continuously, while others have definite left and right endpoints. When all sixteen levels have been played, the sequence repeats with a different color scheme and higher difficulty. One set of levels (65 through 80) is "invisible" (black). After reaching Stage 99, the level counter stops increasing and each successive level shape is picked randomly.

Enemies first appear on the screen as swirling dots beyond the far end of the field, initially showing up one at a time, but coming faster and in greater numbers the more the game progresses. There are seven types of enemies in the game, each with their own behavior pattern. Flippers, shaped like pairs of linked chevrons, attempt to catch the player's blaster and drag it to the far end of the field, costing a life if successful. Pulsars, shaped like wavy lines, periodically electrify the lane which they occupy; if the player's ship is in the lane at that moment, it is destroyed. Fuseballs, white spheres with multiple tendrils, jump forward and back unpredictably along the edges of each lane, destroying the player's ship on contact. They move slowly between the lanes which gives the player a brief opportunity to shoot them. Spikers are spirals that move up and down a lane, leaving a line of "spikes" which may be worn down by shooting it. After the first few levels, each level has a short line of spikes at the far end of every lane. Tankers, rhomboid in shape, slowly advance up the field in a particular lane, splitting into two Flippers upon destruction or reaching the player's ring. Later levels also feature Fuseball and Pulsar Tankers, which split into two Fuseballs or two Pulsars when hit, respectively. Aside from the Fuseball and Pulsar, enemies can shoot destructible projectiles up the lane they reside in, which will destroy the player's ship if they impact.

When all enemies on the field have been destroyed, the player "warps" to the next level by traveling down the field and into the space beyond it. The player must avoid or destroy any spikes that are in the way; hitting one will destroy the player's ship and the warp will have to be retried.

The player loses a life when their ship is destroyed or captured, and the game ends when all lives are lost. Extra lives (up to six at a time) are awarded at certain score intervals.

== Development ==
The game was initially meant to be a first-person remake of Space Invaders, but early versions had many problems, so a new design was used. Theurer says the design came from a nightmare where monsters crawled out of a hole in the ground. This led to him coming up with the design concept, stating he "basically just took Space Invaders and wrapped the surface into a circle," while monsters "come down the tunnel at you, out of the hole, and you [try] to kill them before they [get] out." In opposition to games like Space Invaders, Space Wars and Asteroids, which used buttons for all commands, Theurer used a dial similar to Pong. This reduced the number of inputs and enabled the players to move in a more intuitive way in clockwise or counterclockwise direction around the game space. During the prototype stages the game was called Aliens, then Vortex, and finally Tempest.

Three different cabinet designs exist for Tempest. The most common is an upright cabinet that, viewed from the side, is in the shape of a right triangle sitting on a rectangle. This cabinet sported colorful side art. A shorter, less flashy cabaret-style cabinet was also released with optional side art. A cocktail-style table cabinet allowed two players to play at opposite ends of the table; the screen automatically flipped for each player.

In the first games Atari shipped, there were glitches in one or more of the ROM chips. The problem code allowed the player to do unintended things when ending their score in certain two-digit combinations. According to Joystik magazine, which detailed these combinations, the most useful were the ones that earned the player 40 free credits (06, 11, 12, 16, 17, 18) and the "jump to green" trick (46). Another useful combination mentioned was 05 which allowed the player to play the game in the attract mode. In this scenario, pausing at one of the combinations would cause the effect to take place immediately without losing the balance of the player's lives. Also, in the attract mode, pausing at an end score of 48 gave the player 255 extra lives. After this issue was discovered, Atari corrected the problem so that future machines were incapable of allowing the end score tricks. It was also noted in Joystik that Atari shipped updated chips to be replaced in the field.

== Ports ==
An official port was released for the Atari ST. An official port that bears the Atari logo was released by Superior Software for the BBC Micro and Acorn Electron in 1985, and another by Electric Dreams for the ZX Spectrum and Amstrad CPC in 1987. Versions for the Atari 2600 and 5200 were in the works in Atari, Inc. during 1984, and unfinished prototypes exist for both of them; a prototype of the 2600 version was released by Blaze Entertainment for its Evercade console alongside various games under license from Atari. The game was released for Microsoft Windows 3.x as part of the Microsoft Arcade package. It has 14 secret levels. The original Tempest was included as part of Arcade's Greatest Hits: The Atari Collection 1 for the PlayStation, Sega Saturn, and Super NES. In 2001, Infogrames and Digital Eclipse ported 12 Atari arcade games (one of them being the original Tempest) under the compilation title Atari Anniversary Edition, released for PC and Dreamcast. A PlayStation compilation titled Atari Anniversary Edition Redux was also released with the same number of games plus two exclusives to the Redux edition. A handheld compilation, titled Atari Anniversary Advance, was released in 2002 for the Game Boy Advance with half the games of the console compilation, including Tempest. In 2005, the original Tempest is part of Atari Anthology for the Xbox and PlayStation 2; the PC version also includes the Atari 2600 prototype. The 2600 port was also released as part of the Atari Greatest Hits compilation for Nintendo DS and iOS devices. Also in 2005, a port and graphical "remix" of the original Tempest was included as part of Retro Atari Classics for the Nintendo DS. This version deviates significantly from the basic rules and experience of the original game. Tempest was released for Xbox 360 on December 19, 2007, which was available for purchase through Xbox Live Arcade for 400 MS Points. This version includes the original arcade game (emulated) and an "evolved" version with updated graphics.

After the unfinished Atari 5200 prototype was found in 1999, its original programmer, Keithen Hayenga, resumed work on finishing the port. It was published by AtariAge in 2013 for US$50.

In 2022, the arcade version of Tempest was released as part of Atari 50.

== Reception ==
Reception

Review score
Publication	Score
AllGame	5/5

Chris Crawford wrote in 1982 that unlike Pac-Man, Tempest "intimidates many beginners because it appears to be unwinnable"; its smoothly increasing difficulty, however, encourages players to continue playing. In 1995, Flux magazine ranked the game 6th on their Top 100 Video Games. They lauded the game saying: "The best vector coin-up machine for white knuckle intensity, bar none, was Tempest." In 1996, Next Generation listed the arcade version as number 74 on their "Top 100 Games of All Time", commenting "it's very fast, it has abstract, color vector graphics that remain unequaled to this day, and its novel 'paddle' controller makes playing Tempest effortless. The game's difficulty advances smoothly, and the play is extremely well balanced". Tempest is #10 on the KLOV's list of most popular games, tied with Centipede.

The game has been cited as an influence on the careers of video game designers Jeff Minter and John O'Neill. Atari co-founder Nolan Bushnell has said it is his favorite game to be published by the company.

== Legacy ==
Shortly after the original game was released, an arcade owner named Duncan Brown hacked the level data and made an altered, harder version: Tempest Tubes. It was eventually included with Tempest in the Hasbro compilation Atari Arcade Hits: Volume 1 for Microsoft Windows in 1999.

=== Sequels ===
Jeff Minter created two authorized games, released long after the original: Tempest 2000 (1994) for the Atari Jaguar (renamed Tempest X3 for the PlayStation port), and Tempest 3000 (2000) for Nuon enhanced DVD players. In July 2018, Tempest 4000 was released for multiple platforms. Minter also wrote the Tempest-inspired Space Giraffe (2007) and TxK (2014). After TxK was published for the PlayStation Vita, the current incarnation of Atari blocked release of the game for additional platforms until it was reworked as Tempest 4000 years later.

=== Clones ===
1980s home computer clones include Web War for the Acorn Electron and BBC Micro published by Artic Computing in 1985, Tubeway (1982) for the Apple II, Storm (1984) for the Tandy Color Computer, and Livewire!, a type-in game for Atari 8-bit computers printed in ANALOG Computing in 1983. The Tempest-inspired Axis Assassin (1983) was one of the first five releases from Electronic Arts.

Arashi is a 1992 freeware clone for classic Mac OS. Whirlwind (1994) is a commercial game that Computer Gaming World described as "a clone of Tempest".

=== In popular culture ===
- Tempest is part of a plot thread in the 1984 film Night of the Comet.
- Tempest is featured in the music video for Rush's 1982 song "Subdivisions".
- Parzival must beat Anorak's high score of 728,329 on Tempest (1980 cabinet) in the first part of the final challenge inside the Crystal Gate in the book Ready Player One.
- In the pilot episode of the television series Numbers, Larry Fleinhardt plays Tempest while advising someone on a mathematical problem. Larry is later seen playing the game in the season four episode "End Game".
- Tempest is one of the video games that's part of the main set in the TV sitcom Silver Spoons.
- Tempest is seen in Twilight Zone: The Movie played by Jeremy Licht as Anthony in the third segment of the film, a remake of the television series episode "It's a Good Life". The game's sounds can also later be heard when Anthony's powers fully manifest.

== See also ==
- Golden age of video arcade games
- History of video games
- List of video games in the Museum of Modern Art
