= Video game compilation =

Product bundling of video games

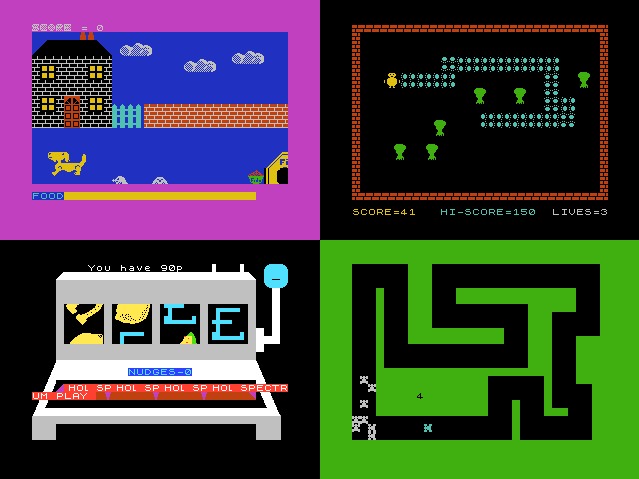
Don't Buy This is a compilation for the ZX Spectrum.

A video game compilation is a type of product bundling in which different video games are available for purchase as a special collection. They are often stored on the same physical media or digital package, making use of menu interfaces that allow players to select the game they want to play. They are a form of video game preservation.

== History ==
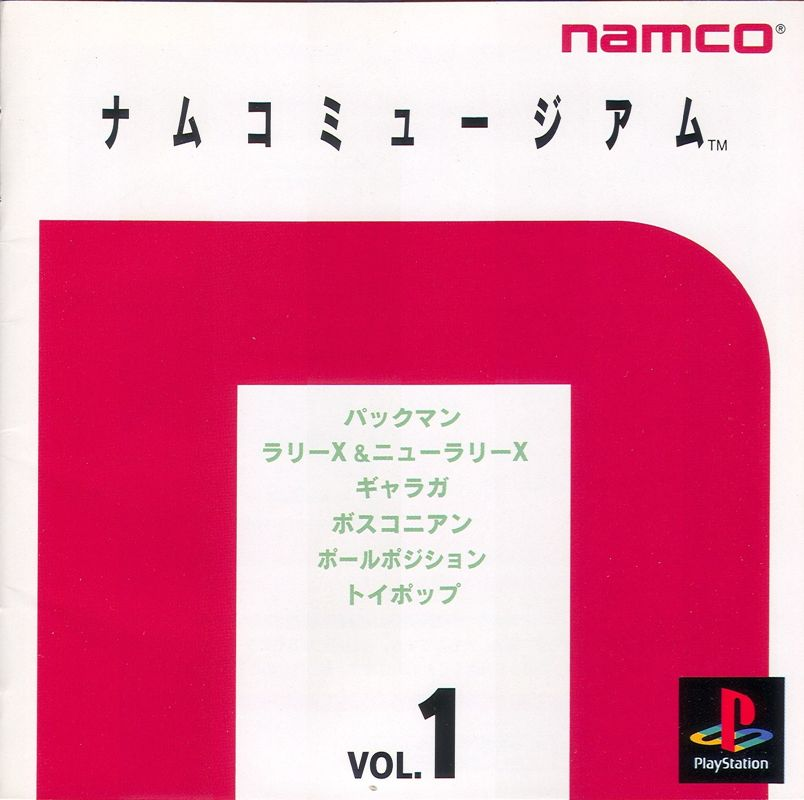
Japanese cover for the compilation Namco Museum Vol. 1 (1995) for the PlayStation, which lists the inclusion of Pac-Man, Rally-X, New Rally-X, Galaga, Bosconian, Pole Position, and Toy Pop on its front cover

The Nintendo Entertainment System received official multicart compilations that re-released earlier games, such as Super Mario Bros. / Duck Hunt / World Class Track Meet. In the early 1990s, Codemasters, an unlicensed publisher, used multicarts to release new games in their Quattro compilations. Action 52, released by Active Enterprises, is infamous for its low quality. Pirate Nintendo compilations often included ROM hacks that replaced character sprites.

Following a new interest in retro gaming in the 1990s, companies began re-releasing their back catalog in video game compilations commercially, such as Microsoft Arcade (1993) for Windows, and the 1995 releases of the first games in the Atari 2600 Action Pack series for home computers and the Namco Museum series for the PlayStation. Video game consoles saw compilations of older arcade games, such as Arcade's Greatest Hits and Williams Arcade's Greatest Hits, while Windows computers received compilations of console games, such as the Sonic & Knuckles Collection. Three Wonders is unusual for a 1991 arcade machine for being a compilation of three games.

Banner for Halo: The Master Chief Collection, showcasing the cover art of games includeed

Renewed interest in retrogaming has motivated the release of multiple compilations in the 2010s and 2020s, such as Teenage Mutant Ninja Turtles: The Cowabunga Collection and the Irem Collection series.

Outside of retro gaming and remaster collections, compilations of games are typically released through bundles. These bundles are often digital, but can be distributed in a physical form, such as various compilations by Sega published on the Nintendo Switch, with multiple games on a single Nintendo Switch game card.
