= Boss key =

Keyboard shortcut to quickly hide programs

A boss key, or boss button, is a keyboard shortcut used in some applications, usually games for IBM PC compatibles, to hide the program quickly, The boss often displays a screen that mimics a productivity program, such as a spreadsheet. One of the earliest implementations was by Friendlyware, a suite of entertainment and general interest programs written in BASIC and sold with the original IBM PC AT and IBM PC XT computers from 1982 to 1985. When activated (by pressing F10), an ASCII bar graph with generic "Productivity" and "Time" labels appeared. Pressing F10 again returned to the Friendlyware application.

== In computer games ==
The nominal purpose of the boss key is to make it appear to superiors and coworkers that employees are doing their job when they are actually playing games or using the Internet for non work-related tasks. It was included in some video games for personal computers, because at the time people often did not have home computers and playing at work was their only option. Most boss keys were used to show dummy COMMAND.COM prompts. The use has faded, as modern multitasking operating systems have evolved. However, some programs still retain a boss key feature, such as instant messaging clients or their add-ons or comic book viewers like MComix.

The boss key was first used in the Apple II game Bezare, published by Southwestern Data Systems. The idea of it was proposed by Roger Wagner (founder of Southwestern Data Systems, and later Roger Wagner Publishing) on a hang-gliding trip in Mexico in March, 1981, in a conversation between Roger Wagner and Doug Carlston (of Broderbund Software). Steve Wozniak, Andy Hertzfeld and a number of other early personal computing pioneers were also part of that event. Wes Cherry, the author of the original Microsoft Solitaire, had included a boss key to display a fake spreadsheet or random C code, but was asked by his superiors to remove this on release.

Another early example of the boss key is in the IBM PC version of Asylum, which clears the screen when F9 is pressed. Certain games have taken the idea of the boss key and used it to comic effect. Infocom's adult-themed Leather Goddesses of Phobos (only the IBM PC version) had a boss key which would hide the game and show a screen designed to look like a Cornerstone database view. Upon closer inspection, however, the screen was not exactly boss safe, being populated with order info on rather ridiculous adult items, including an "inflatable milkman". Sierra On-Line's comedy/sci-fi adventure game Space Quest III had a so-called boss key available from the game's pulldown menu. However, when the user selected it, the game would call out the user on trying to avoid attention, display how long the user had been playing the game, and state "being the good company men that we are, we can't help you cheat like that." The first few games in Sierra's Leisure Suit Larry series included a boss key in the pulldown menus (shortcut usually Ctrl+B). However, when this is used, it results in an instantaneous game over, with the first game saying "Sorry, but you'll have to restore your game; when you panic, I forget everything!". Game creator Al Lowe explained this as being done for speed reasons, since saving the player’s position would take additional time. The boss key for the computer submarine game GATO was the Esc key, which, when pressed, brought up a Lotus 1-2-3 type spreadsheet screen.

=== Microsoft's implementation ===
In 1993, Microsoft introduced a five-pack collection of games whose boss button was the ESC key, positioned in the upper left corner of the keyboard. This is in contrast to the use of two keys, the CTRL key plus the letter "B" (for "boss"). Moreover, to demonstrate the power of Windows, it could fill the entire screen or just a portion thereof.

== In popular culture ==
The official website for the Car Talk radio show had a boss button at the bottom of the page from April 1997 to March 2017.

The boss button has appeared on every NCAA tournament since the 2005 NCAA men's basketball tournament website for March Madness, which allowed viewers to watch every game.

== Alternatives ==
On modern operating systems, applications may be minimized or switched to the background with a keyboard shortcut. Under desktop environments with multiple workspaces, one possibility is to maintain one "boss" workspace and to switch to it when the boss is coming. A 2014 newspaper article titled "How to watch the Olympics at work without getting caught" described a Mozilla Firefox feature that provides a keyboard shortcut named PanicButton.
