= Mystic Marathon =

1984 arcade video game

- Developer: Williams Electronics
- Publisher: Williams Electronics
- Designer: Kristina Donofrio
- Programmers: Kristina Donofrio; Ken Graham
- Artists: Pam Erickson; Jill Chittenden
- Platform: Arcade
- Release: NA: March 1984
- Genre: Action
- Mode: Single-player
- Arcade system: Williams 6809 REV.2

Mystic Marathon is a horizontally scrolling arcade video game released by Williams Electronics in 1984. The game presents a race between horned, shoe-wearing, fantasy creatures called "Benkins" on a course covering small islands and the water between them. It was programmed by Kristina Donofrio and Ken Graham. Donofrio later worked on Joust 2: Survival of the Fittest.

The game was only available as a conversion kit for Williams games with horizontal monitors, marking the first such kit from the company. Three versions were released: one for Defender; one for Joust, Robotron: 2084, and Stargate; and one for Bubbles. 500 conversion kits were produced in total along with 5 dedicated cabinet prototypes.

Mystic Marathon was released in the year following the video game crash of 1983 alongside Turkey Shoot and Inferno, none of which were as successful as earlier games from Williams or ported to contemporary home systems.

== Development ==
Mystic Marathon was developed by Williams Electronics, with Kristina Donofrio as the lead designer and programmer, Ken Graham as the secondary programmer, with input from Python Anghelo and Noah Falstein. Donofrio had previously worked on Williams pinball games as a sound engineer; Graham did additional programming for other Williams games including Sinistar and Bubbles. Graham's primary responsibility on Mystic Marathon was to generate the backgrounds and sprites. It was the first game for Williams 6809 REV.2 hardware. The sound synthesis is reused from Williams System 7 hardware.

== Gameplay ==
The game is a left-to-right footrace between the player-controlled an elf-like creature (a "Benkin") and six other Benkins controlled by the computer. The goal is to finish in the top three to progress to the next race. A radar at the top of the screen shows the entire course and position of the contestants.

Each island contains multiple paths, and the creatures have to swim the water between the islands, which is slower than running. Many obstacles slow the creatures down, including apple-throwing trees, lightning, sea monsters, giant clams, and sinkholes. There are also ways to move forward quickly, such as a hand that throws a character and caves that warp the creature to the exit. In addition to a joystick for movement, there is a jump button.

== Emulation ==
When emulated via MAME, the colors are incorrect. In the original game, the water is blue and the rocks are gray, for example, but in MAME the water is magenta and rocks are pink. Most of the screenshots and video of Mystic Marathon on the web were taken from MAME with incorrect colors.
