= XXX (video game) =

2002 action video game

xXx
- North America cover art
- Developer: Digital Eclipse
- Publisher: Activision
- Director: Mike Mika
- Producers: Michael Bilodeau; Brian Clarke
- Programmers: Mark Fitt; Alex Amsel
- Artist: Dean Lee
- Composer: Anthony Putson
- Platform: Game Boy Advance
- Release: NA: August 6, 2002; EU: October 18, 2002
- Genres: Run and gun, vehicular combat
- Mode: single-player

XXX (stylized as xXx) is a 2002 action video game developed by Digital Eclipse and published by Activision for the Game Boy Advance. Based on the film of the same name, the narrative follows Xander "xXx" Cage, an underground thrill-seeker who is recruited as a spy to stop the evil Anarchy 99 organization before it unleashes an assault on the Earth. Much of the game is played in a side-scrolling run and gun format, while a few levels feature vehicular combat inspired by Road Rash. The game was developed in approximately two months and received mixed reviews upon release, with critics faulting the gameplay's lack of innovation, simplistic AI, and short length, though the visuals (particularly those of the motorcycle levels) and music were assessed positively.

== Gameplay ==
The gameplay of XXX is divided between run-and-gun levels (top) and vehicular combat (bottom).

XXX is an action game in which the player controls the titular character, an NSA agent assigned to take out the crime syndicate Anarchy 99. The game consists of eleven levels, nine of which feature side-scrolling run and gun gameplay, and three showcase motorcycle-based vehicular combat. Each level has a series of given mission objectives that must be completed in order to progress. When the player completes an objective or is given a new one, a white envelope icon at the top of the HUD blinks. The player can review the current objectives by pausing the game.

By default, xXx is armed with a handgun that fires an unlimited amount of chrome darts. More powerful ammo and weapons can be found within levels, and weapons in xXx's possession can be cycled through with the Select button. Aside from the ammo in xXx's gun, up to three extra clips can be held at a time. The amount of remaining ammo and clips for xXx's current weapon are indicated at the top-left corner of the screen. Apart from firearms, xXx can also toss grenades, which can be collected in packs of five. xXx's health is indicated on the top-left corner of the screen, and the player is granted a single life; if the player runs out of health, the game ends, and the player is given the option to retry the current level from the beginning. The player can replenish health by collecting first aid kits throughout the level.

Some levels involve xXx riding a motorcycle and engaging in hand-to-hand combat with enemy riders. The motorcycle has a limited amount of fuel, which can be replenished by collecting fuel canisters scattered along the road, and can take only a certain amount of damage before it is destroyed. A bar indicating the player's remaining distance to the end of the level is placed at the bottom-right corner of the screen.

== Plot ==
Underground thrill-seeker Xander Cage is recruited by the National Security Administration as the agent "xXx" after passing an entrance exam set up by Agent Gibbons. He is tasked with taking down the crime syndicate Anarchy 99 and its leader Yorgi, who are armed with biological weapons and a terrorist agenda. In the Czech Republic, xXx disables missiles hidden in the Old Town, the Prague Metro, the Sedlec Ossuary, and the mines of Kutná Hora. In Brno, xXx confiscates stolen canisters of plutonium and destroys a cache of missiles and a precursor chemical virus. xXx returns to Prague and stops Anarchy 99's colonel from bombing a sports arena, and raids the city's television tower, where Yorgi is located. Yorgi escapes to his secret underground bunker, where xXx tracks down and kills him.

== Development and release ==
In May 2002, Activision announced that it had acquired the worldwide video game rights to the then-upcoming Vin Diesel film XXX. The game was developed by Digital Eclipse for the Game Boy Advance, with Michael Bilodeau of Digital Eclipse and Brian Clarke of Activision serving as producers, and Mike Mika serving as creative director. Mark Fitt and Alex Amsel programmed the game, and Dave McMullan designed the levels. Boyd Burggrabe served as art director and supervised a team consisting of lead artist Dean Lee and artists Arvin Bautista, Stoo Cambridge, Kevin James, Antony Mazzotta, Andy Noble, and Kostandin Igor Ruiz. The music was composed by Anthony Putson, while the sound effects were created by Allister Brimble. All the team members had previous experience developing titles for the Game Boy Advance; Fitt, Amsel, and some of the artists had worked on Alienators: Evolution Continues, while Bilodeau and the rest of the artists worked on X-Men: Reign of Apocalypse, Spider-Man, and Disney's Lilo and Stitch. The game featured an original narrative during development, but was later made to follow the film's storyline at the filmmakers' request. The motorcycle levels were heavily influenced by the Sega Genesis title Road Rash.

Development spanned approximately two months, which Bilodeau considered unusually quick as the normal development cycle of Game Boy Advance games is a minimum of five or six months. XXX was displayed in a pre-alpha state at E3 2002, and was released in North America on August 6, 2002, with a European release following on October 18.

== Reception ==
Reception

Aggregate score
Aggregator	Score
Metacritic	50/100

Review scores
Publication	Score
Electronic Gaming Monthly	5.5/10
Game Informer	3/10
GameSpot	4/10
GameSpy	77%
IGN	6/10
Nintendo World Report	7.5/10

XXX received "mixed or average" reviews according to the review aggregator website Metacritic. Some critics' low expectations of a film tie-in on the Game Boy Advance, set so low from Star Wars: Episode II – Attack of the Clones, were surpassed. However, the gameplay was generally criticized as run-of-the-mill, monotonous and, at worst, "soulless".

Steve Steinberg of GameSpy considered the difficulty well-balanced, whereas IGN's Craig Harris regarded the game as excessively easy due to xXx's high endurance and an abundance of health pick-ups and weapons. Harris, as well as Electronic Gaming Monthly's John Ricciardi, admired the size of the levels, though Ben Kosmina of Planet GameCube was puzzled by the lack of a radar, which he said made locating some objectives and exits difficult. Steinberg praised the controls as tight and intuitive, but wished that they were more varied to better reflect xXx's depiction in the film as an extreme athlete. Harris and the Nintendo Power reviewers found some of the weapons satisfying to use. The enemy AI was faulted for its simplicity, with the enemies' actions being largely restricted to pacing back and forth and shooting upon sight of xXx in predictable patterns. Although Harris pointed out that enemy bullets can be easily dodged by ducking, GameSpot's Frank Provo claimed that such an action was nonviable when passing through a door or landing from a fall, and he added that the enemies' simplicity and numbers contributed to a feeling of tedium. The game's length was deemed to be short, with Ricciardi only recommending it for a day's rental, and Harris added that the attempts to add replay value by offering unlockable content were not as fleshed out as those of Digital Eclipse's previous title Spider-Man.

Reviewers acknowledged the resemblance of the motorcycle levels to the Road Rash series. Provo regarded them as the game's most enjoyable aspect, while Ricciardi said they were "cool-looking, but not very exciting", and Harris considered the first motorcycle level to be a significant spike in difficulty following the first two levels. Kosmina deemed the motorcycle levels on a whole incredibly difficult due to an overabundance of enemies and obstacles and poor collision detection in regard to xXx's punches and kicks. Kato dismissed the levels as an uninteresting and paltry imitation.

Assessments of the visuals were generally positive. Steinberg and Provo commended the large size and fluid animation of the character sprites, though Harris found the animation for xXx to be "a little too goofy to watch" due to his gun being perpetually aimed. He additionally ridiculed the characters' lack of resemblance to their film appearances, which prompted speculation that the film license excluded the actors' likenesses, and remarked on Samuel L. Jackson's character that "I've seen guys at McDonalds that bear better resemblance than the likeness the artists created for this game". Kosmina noted the variety of the enemy characters, though he likened xXx's appearance to "Patrick Stewart in a pair of trackpants". Steinberg and Provo admired the colorful and detailed backgrounds and settings, with Kosmina singling out the subway and catacomb levels. Harris, however, considered the backgrounds to be harshly drawn with rigid angles and with a confusing perspective. The motorcycle levels were said to be smoothly animated and showcased the Game Boy Advance's modest 3D capabilities well, though Harris was distracted by the singular repeating texture tile used for the ground. The techno soundtrack was also positively covered, with Provo complimenting its fast pace and refined "theatrical quality".
