= Dactyl Joust =

Unreleased action-platform video game

- Developer: High Voltage Software
- Publisher: Atari Corporation
- Series: Joust
- Platforms: Jaguar, Jaguar CD
- Release: Unreleased
- Genre: Action/Platform
- Mode: Single-player

Dactyl Joust (Note: Also known as Joust 2000.) is an unreleased action-platform video game that was in development by High Voltage Software and planned to be published by Atari Corporation on a scheduled November 1995 release date exclusively for both the Atari Jaguar and the Atari Jaguar CD add-on. It was intended to be a remake of John Newcomer's 1982 arcade game Joust, where players take control of a knight riding a pterodactyl, instead of a flying ostrich, on a first-person perspective battling and defeating groups of enemy knights riding dactyls. The game formed part of a partnership deal between Atari Corp. and Williams Entertainment that included plans to update and release some of the latter's early arcade games for the Jaguar platform.

== Gameplay ==
Gameplay screenshot from one of the beta builds.

Dactyl Joust is an action-platform game similar to the original Joust and Joust 2: Survival of the Fittest, where players take control of a knight riding a pterodactyl from a first-person perspective in a 3D environment battling and defeating groups of enemy knights riding dactyls, instead of a flying ostrich like its predecessors.

== History ==
In early 1994, a port of the original Joust for the Atari Jaguar was showcased on few print publications such as Electronic Gaming Monthly and it was intended to be a hidden easter egg on an upcoming title for the console. On September of the same year, both Atari Corporation and Williams Entertainment announced their partnership that included plans to update and release some of the latter's early arcade games for the Jaguar such as Defender, Joust and Robotron, while Atari Corp. handled the publishing of these titles respectively. Later on during the same time period, it was planned for a Q2 1995 release, now under its finalized name.

Six months later, the game alongside Mortal Kombat III was announced for Jaguar as a result of their partnership. The game was said to be still under development, with ex-Atari Corporation vice-president in third-party development Bill Rehbock stating several of its planned features such as being played from a first-person perspective in a 3D environment. During this period, only a few in-game screenshots of the project were showcased on magazines such as Ultimate Future Games and Edge respectively (which also mentioned it as an Atari Jaguar CD title), while it was still listed for a Q2 1995 release.

Later in the year, Dactyl Joust was now planned for a November/Q4 1995 launch date, while internal documents from Atari also revealed that High Voltage Software were responsible for the development of the project. An anonymous High Voltage Software employee recounted its development process in a post at Slashdot after being cancelled, stating several of the techniques and features in the game. Scott Corley, main programmer and one of the designers of Ruiner Pinball at High Voltage, recounted more about the development process of the title for the system in a thread at the 3DO Zone forums in July 2014. Scott stated that translating the original mechanics into 3D and make it intuitive to play proved to be the most difficult process during development, in addition of obtaining an optimal performance when developing on the Jaguar.

Despite internal documents from Atari still listing Dactyl Joust as still in development as of December 1995, High Voltage stopped receiving payment from the former for the development of the project in the middle of 1995, leading the latter to believe it was being abandoned. In an email exchange with website CyberRoach, a former programmer of the project stated that it was playable, while both artwork and a preliminary cover art are also rumored to exist. In 2003, a short video clip of the game was showcased to the public by Carl Forhan of Songbird Productions and HVS CCO Eric Nofsinger.
