= Mucha Lucha! Mascaritas of the Lost Code =

2003 video game

- Developer: Digital Eclipse
- Publisher: Ubisoft
- Director: Mike Mika
- Producers: William Baffy; Ashley Bushore; Marc Fish; Eric Bram
- Designer: Mari Sakai
- Programmers: Mark Fitt; Alex Amsel
- Artists: Stoo Cambridge; Krzysztof Grudzinski; Peter Overstreet
- Writer: Erin Bradley
- Composers: Anthony Putson; Allister Brimble
- Platform: Game Boy Advance
- Release: NA: November 18, 2003
- Genre: Beat 'em up
- Mode: Single-player

Mucha Lucha! Mascaritas of the Lost Code is a 2003 beat 'em up video game developed by Digital Eclipse and published by Ubisoft for the Game Boy Advance. Based on the animated television series of the same name, the game follows the series' main characters Rikochet, Buena Girl, and The Flea, who must recover a stolen tome belonging to their school. The game was critically panned upon release, with reviewers faulting its repetitive gameplay, lack of challenge, and failure to capture the wrestling essence of the source material, despite some praise for its visual fidelity to the cartoon.

== Gameplay and premise ==
An example of gameplay in Mucha Lucha! Mascaritas of the Lost Code

Mucha Lucha! Mascaritas of the Lost Code is a side-scrolling beat 'em up in which the player controls either Rikochet, Buena Girl, or The Flea, who are tasked with recovering the stolen Code of Masked Wrestling tome for their school, the International School of Lucha, under threat of expulsion. Only Rikochet is playable initially, with Buena Girl and The Flea unlocked later. The game features simple controls — including punch, kick, throw, and jump — with jump attacks executed by combining the jump button with either punch or kick. Each character has a special move, activated by pressing punch and kick simultaneously, which clears all enemies on-screen. The game spans four episodes with 16 short levels. Stages involve clearing waves of enemies to progress. Some levels include hidden areas with extra enemies or power-ups, which contribute to a letter grade based on performance (e.g., defeating all enemies, clearing within a time limit).

== Development and release ==
Mucha Lucha! Mascaritas of the Lost Code was developed by Digital Eclipse and published by Ubisoft's North American branch. Digital Eclipse's William Baffy, Ubisoft's Ashley Bushore and Marc Fish, and Warner Bros. Interactive Entertainment's Eric Bram served as producers, and Mike Mika served as creative director. Mark Fitt was the lead programmer, with assistance from Alex Amsel, and Ubisoft's Mari Sakai was the designer. The artwork was created under director Boyd Burggrabe and manager Andy Crawshaw, supervising a team consisting of Stoo Cambridge, Krzysztof Grudzinski, and Peter Overstreet. Sonia Di Gennaro and Alan Moult served as the animators. The music was composed by Anthony Putson and Allister Brimble, with the latter also creating the sound effects. The story and dialogue were written by Erin Bradley.

Mucha Lucha! Mascaritas of the Lost Code was announced by Ubisoft in August 2003 and was released exclusively in North America on November 18, 2003.

== Reception ==
Reception

Aggregate score
Aggregator	Score
Metacritic	26/100

Review scores
Publication	Score
GameSpot	3.2/10
GameZone	4.5/10
IGN	2/10
Nintendo Power	1.5/5, 1.5/5, 1.5/5, 1.5/5, 2.5/5 (Note: Five critics of Nintendo Power ranked the game individually.)
Pocket Games	1/10

The game received "generally unfavorable reviews" according to the review aggregation website Metacritic. Critics universally deemed the game a disappointment, even for fans of the cartoon. Alex Navarro of GameSpot and "The Bearer" of GameZone suggested it fails to leverage the show's charm, while Craig Harris of IGN called it a "rush-job" and Jon Dudlak of Pocket Games labeled it "irresponsibly bad". The game was said to lack replay value, depth, or innovation, with Dudlak suggesting it is barely worth a demonstration. The Bearer and Harris expressed frustration that the developers did not create a wrestling-focused game, which would have better suited the license.

Critics unanimously panned the gameplay as repetitive, simplistic, and monotonous. The game was described as devolving into button-mashing (typically using punch or kick), with no need for strategy or variety. The enemies were noted to require an excessive number of hits (estimated at 20–25) to defeat, artificially padding the short game length (around two hours to complete). Despite claims of 15 moves per character, The Bearer found little incentive to use them. Navarro highlighted that special moves clear screens but are unnecessary due to enemies' lack of aggression, while Harris criticized poor collision detection and unresponsive feedback, making combat feel unrewarding. The Bearer and Harris emphasized the game's failure to incorporate wrestling mechanics, despite the cartoon's premise, rendering it a generic and poorly executed beat 'em up.

The visuals were the most praised aspect, with The Bearer and Nintendo Power noting the cel-shaded, cartoony art style effectively mirrors the show's aesthetic. The Bearer said that the characters resemble their cartoon counterparts, and the game runs smoothly without slowdown, even with multiple enemies on-screen. However, the environments were criticized as bland, bare, and repetitive. Navarro and Dudlak also noted poor animation quality and lack of detail, giving the game a low-budget, rushed appearance.

The audio received near-universal criticism. The Bearer described the music as "tinny" and repetitive, with minimal sound effects, often leaving combat silent. Navarro found the sound design "bare-bones" but serviceable, while Harris and Dudlak criticized the looping, uninspired Latin-infused tracks that became grating. Harris also mentioned a "Mucha Lucha!" sample as a minor inclusion.

Reviewers agreed the game is excessively easy, requiring minimal skill. Navarro noted enemies' weak AI allows players to corner and spam attacks, while The Bearer and Harris emphasized that a single button suffices for the entire game. Boss battles were described as slightly larger enemies with predictable patterns, offering no significant challenge. Navarro saw the high hit counts for enemies and minor objectives as attempts to extend the game's short runtime, but these added no meaningful engagement.
