= Bubbles (video game) =

1983 video game

- Promotional flyer showing the wooden upright and cocktail cabinets
- Developer: Williams Electronics
- Publisher: Williams Electronics
- Designers: John Kotlarik; Tim Murphy; Python Anghelo
- Platform: Arcade
- Release: NA: March 1983
- Genre: Action
- Modes: Single-player, multiplayer

Bubbles is a 1983 action game developed and published by Williams Electronics for arcades. The player uses a joystick to control a bubble in a kitchen sink. The objective is to progress through levels by cleaning the sink while avoiding enemies.

The game was developed by John Kotlarik and Python Anghelo. Kotlarik wanted to create a non-violent game inspired by Pac-Man. Anghelo designed the artwork and scenario as well as a special plastic cabinet that saw limited use. Bubbles was later released on home consoles as part of arcade compilations and online as a web-based version.

Reception was mixed and focused on the odd premise. Critics nonetheless praised the gameplay as enjoyable, with some noting the title's obscurity. While reviewers were divided on the audiovisuals, a common point of criticism was the graphics having an excess of blue.

== Gameplay ==
The light blue bubble (center right) avoids brushes and razors to clean up ants, crumbs, and grease within the sink. Game statistics, such as the score and level number, are tracked in the top left corner of the screen.

Bubbles is an action game where the player controls a soap bubble from a top-down perspective. The objective is to clean a kitchen sink by maneuvering over ants, crumbs, and grease spots to absorb them before they slide into the drain. As the bubble absorbs more objects, it grows in size, soon acquiring eyes and then a smiling mouth. At the same time, sponges and scrub brushes slowly move around the sink, cleaning it on their own in competition with the player. Touching these enemies costs the player one life unless the bubble is at its largest size. If the bubble is large enough, the enemy will be knocked away and the bubble will shrink. Sponges and brushes can be knocked into the drain for bonus points, eliminating them from play.

Two other enemies in the sink are stationary razor blades and roaches that crawl out of the drain. Contact with a blade is always fatal, while the bubble can safely touch the roach only when carrying a broom, which will kill the roach on contact. The broom can be acquired by moving over a cleaning lady who sometimes appears in the sink. The level ends when all of the point-scoring objects are no longer on the playing field. If the bubble has acquired a complete face, the player moves on to the next level; otherwise, one life is lost and the level must be replayed. Alternatively, the player can skip the level by going down the drain when it flashes green after the bubble has obtained a face. Entering the drain while the bubble is too small costs one life.

== Development ==
Bubbles was developed and published by Williams Electronics. The initial concept was conceived by John Kotlarik, who aimed to make a non-violent game. Inspired by Pac-Man, he envisioned similar gameplay in an open playing field rather than in a maze. Python Anghelo furthered the concept by creating artwork and a scenario. Kotlarik designed the protagonist to have fluid movement like it was traveling on a slick surface. The control scheme allows the digital input to operate similar to an analogue one. He programmed the bubble to accelerate in the direction the joystick is held. Once the joystick returns to its neutral position, the bubble will coast as the velocity slowly decreases.

=== Hardware ===
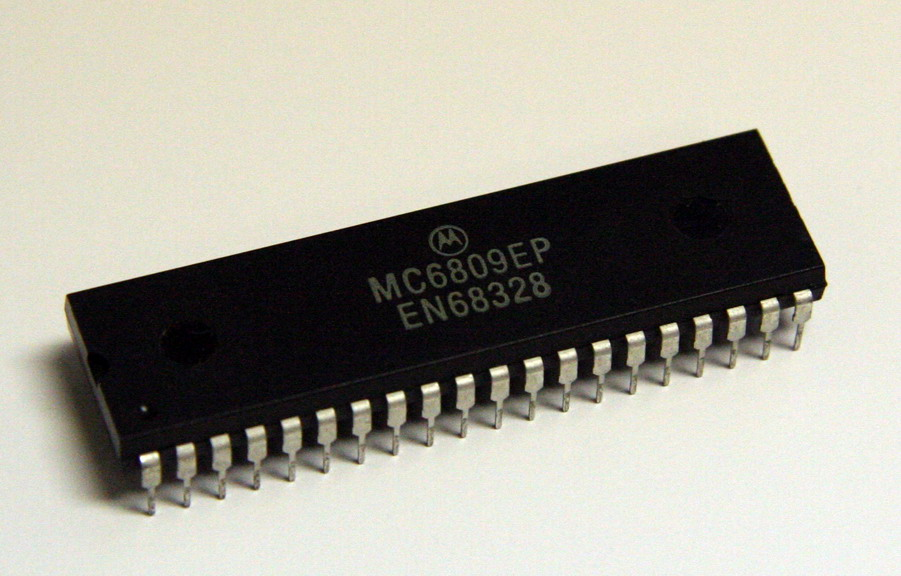
Bubbles followed Williams Electronics' design trend in the early 1980s of using the Motorola 6809 microprocessor (pictured) as the arcade machine's main CPU.

The game uses monaural sound and raster graphics on a 19 inch CRT monitor. Like Williams' other early arcade games, Bubbles' hardware is similar to that of the company's first video game, the 1981 arcade game Defender. Bubbles' hardware consists of five circuit boards—a main central processing unit (CPU), a read-only memory (ROM) board, a soundboard, an interface controller board, and the power supply—that coordinate different processes required to operate the game. It uses a 1 MHz Motorola 6809E microprocessor as the main CPU, which executes the game code and assembles the graphics to display on the screen. Bubbles' game code, which was programmed in assembly language, and graphics data are stored on a 48 KB ROM board. The soundboard consists of its own dedicated ROM and CPU to store sound data and play the sound effects, respectively.

Anghelo designed the artwork for the wooden cabinets as well as a new cylindrical, plastic cabinet. This plastic model was dubbed the "Duramold" unit. Gary Berge, a mechanical engineer, created the new cabinets with a rotational molding process. Though the plastic cabinets were durable, they would shrink over time, occasionally causing the device to become inoperable. Williams Electronics used this cabinet for only two other games: Blaster and Sinistar. The arcade unit includes settings to adjust the difficulty. Bubbles arcade cabinets have varying degrees of rarity. The cocktail and cabaret cabinets are the rarest, followed by the plastic and upright versions; the plastic models are more valuable among collectors.

== Release ==
Williams promoted the game at the Amusement Operators Expo (AOE) in March 1983 at the O'Hare Exposition Center in Chicago, Illinois. Afterward, it registered Bubbles' program and graphics with the United States Copyright Office on May 2, 1983. The company then filed the stylized logo with the United States Patent and Trademark Office on May 13, 1983.

After Bubbles' release in arcades, the game was neither followed by a sequel nor ported to home consoles at the time. Williams Entertainment (Note: Williams Electronics changed its name to WMS Industries in 1987, and after acquiring Tradewest in 1994, WMS Industries renamed the new subsidiary Williams Entertainment to release home ports of its arcade games.) would later include Bubbles in several of its arcade compilations over a decade after its initial release: the 1996 Williams Arcade's Greatest Hits, the 2000 Midway's Greatest Arcade Hits (Dreamcast version only), the 2003 Midway Arcade Treasures, the 2012 Midway Arcade Origins, and the 2022 Midway Legacy Edition Arcade1Up cabinet. Many of the anthologies were created by Digital Eclipse, who used emulation to run the original source code. While the developers focused on including highly recognizable games, the team was able to easily add Bubbles as a bonus title due to the similarity between the hardware of Williams' early arcade games. In 2000, a web-based version of Bubbles, along with nine other classic arcade games, was published on Shockwave.com. Four years later, Midway Games (Note: WMS Industries purchased Midway in 1988 and later transferred its games to the Midway Games subsidiary.) launched a website featuring the Shockwave versions.

== Reception ==
Bubbles received a mixed reception by gaming publications. After the AOE trade show, William Brown of Electronic Fun with Computers & Games praised Bubbles, highlighting it as an example of games available in the summer that were more creative and technologically advanced in terms of gameplay and audiovisuals. He described it as a "goof-fest" with "challenging" gameplay. While Brown called the graphics "superb", he felt the amount of blue in the visuals was "monotonous". Video Games magazine's Roger Sharpe also noted Bubbles' appearance at the AOE, calling it "unique" and a "nice change of pace" for Williams. While he believed that Sinistar stood out more, Sharpe described Bubbles' gameplay as a "nice diversion". However, Sharpe stated that he could not conceive how a follow up would play if it was successful. By September 1983, Play Meter had ranked it one of the top fifteen arcade games based on polling from arcade operators.

Contemporary commentary focused on the game's premise. Writing for Computer and Video Games, Clare Edgeley considered the premise "pretty weird". She criticized Bubbles, stating that the constant blue background was dull and the game lacked longevity. While he considered the scenario atypical, Michael Blanchet of Electronic Fun with Computers & Games believed that it was good sign developers were forced to expanded beyond the common genres of games. Similarly, a writer for Videogaming & Computergaming Illustrated felt the game demonstrated that game designers could adapt any theme. In describing the gameplay, they wrote that the unique design had a "difficult adjustment period". In a retrospective of 1983, Video Games magazine's John Holmstrom noted that Williams and other developers had begun to shift away from arcade video games, which he attributed to an industry downturn. While he pointed to Bubbles as an example of Williams' producing an inferior product compared to past efforts, Holmstrom speculated it would have been more successful if released a few years earlier.

The game's inclusion in Williams Arcade's Greatest Hits was met with a mixed response from gaming publications. A reviewer for Maximum: The Video Game Magazine called Bubbles "easily forgettable" and excluded it from their praise of the compilation. Tommy Glide of GamePro magazine described the title as an extra inclusion, calling it "unique but mundane". In reviewing the Sega Genesis version of the anthology, which did not include Bubbles, the four Electronic Gaming Monthly reviewers questioned the reason behind the omission. Rich Leadbetter of Sega Saturn Magazine reviewed the Saturn version of the compilation, Midway Presents Arcade's Greatest Hits, and argued that Bubbles, though obscure, is solidly entertaining. Writing a review of Midway's Greatest Arcade Hits Volume 1 for GamesMaster magazine, Robin Alway did not consider Bubbles an "all-time classic" and described it as an inferior inclusion.

Bubbles also met a mixed response in retrospective reviews. In his book of early video game history, Mark Wolf noted that Bubbles felt "unorthodox" when compared to modern gameplay conventions. He attributed this to "rapid innovation" that took place in the golden age of arcade video games before most conventions were established. Wolf also described it as an "offbeat and less-known experiment". Author John Sellers listed the title among the weirder arcade games released. In the Shacknews Arcade Corner series, Greg Burke called the gameplay "addicting" and fun to play in modern times. He attributed the game's mixed reception to a "lack of decent sound effects" and described the title as "underrated". Retro Gamer's Darran Jones described the game as engrossing and obscure, and he expressed disappointment that few people remember it.
