= Arcade's Greatest Hits: The Midway Collection 2 =

1997 video game

- North American PlayStation box art
- Developer: Digital Eclipse
- Publisher: Midway Games
- Platforms: PlayStation, Windows
- Release: NA: November 1997
- Genre: Various
- Modes: Single-player, multiplayer

Arcade's Greatest Hits: The Midway Collection 2 is a compilation of arcade video games either made by, or acquired by Midway Games for the PlayStation and Windows. This game is technically the sequel to Williams Arcade's Greatest Hits, which also had Midway acquired games included, also released on the PlayStation.

This series ran parallel to the Arcade's Greatest Hits: The Atari Collection series, as both series include a Volume 1 and a Volume 2.

== Games ==
This compilation contains the following games:

1. Blaster (1983)
2. BurgerTime (1982)
3. Joust 2: Survival of the Fittest (1986)
4. Moon Patrol (1982)
5. Root Beer Tapper (1983)
6. SPLAT! (previously unreleased) [1982]
7. Spy Hunter (1983)

BurgerTime was produced by Data East, then licensed to Midway for North American release. Moon Patrol was produced by Irem and licensed to Williams Electronics.

== Reception ==
Reception

Review scores
| Publication | Score |
|---|---|
| AllGame | 3.5/5 (PS) |
| Electronic Gaming Monthly | 7.125/10 (PS) |
| GameSpot | 6.6/10 (PS) |
| IGN | 7/10 (PS) |
| Next Generation | 4/5 (PS) |
| Computer Games Magazine | 3.5/5 |
| The Sydney Morning Herald | 3/5 |
| Florida Today | A- |

The compilation was positively received by critics. Most commented that the three genuine hits in the collection (Burgertime, Moon Patrol, and Spy Hunter) held up well, though reactions to the re-presentation of Spy Hunter varied a bit. Next Generation and IGN praised the digital recreation of the arcade cabinet's light-up weapons displays and regarded it as the killer app of the lineup, but the four reviewers of Electronic Gaming Monthly (EGM) unanimously said Spy Hunter could no longer hold their interest, and Josh Smith of GameSpot remarked that the controls do not work well with the PlayStation joypad. He said that otherwise the games in the collection translated better to PlayStation controls than did those in the earlier Arcade's Greatest Hits: The Atari Collection 1, commenting that "In comparing one [retro game] volume to the next, only two things really matter: the number of good games in the collection and whether or not the gameplay of the individual emulations feels right with a console controller. Midway's second offering is strong on both accounts."

Reactions to the four more obscure games in the collection varied more, but most critics found at least one in the bunch which they greatly enjoyed. John Ricciardi of EGM said that though he had never been a fan of Root Beer Tapper, he found it much more enjoyable than he remembered, and his co-reviewer Sushi-X said it was an old favorite of his. Next Generation and IGN argued that Blaster and Joust 2 were the reasons to get the collection for true gamers, due to their rarity and groundbreaking gameplay. Smith also considered these two games to be exciting and refreshingly bizarre inclusions. GamePro ventured that Joust 2 was the best of the seven games and a substantial improvement over the original Joust, though they were overall less enthusiastic about the compilation than most, concluding that it has a strong lineup of games but is ultimately "for historians only." John Ricciardi and Kraig Kujawa of EGM, while making clear that they found the compilation a good value, especially with the bonus of the trivia game, concluded that gamers should decide whether to buy it based on whether they personally like the games included on it. Next Generation instead summed up, "All in all, Midway Collection 2 brings the glory days of the arcade back without feeling like a cash-in. Hallelujah." IGN was also generally laudatory, saying that the trivia game alone makes Midway Collection 2 worth buying for retrogaming enthusiasts.

EGM named Midway Collection 2 a runner-up for "Best Compilation" (behind Street Fighter Collection) at their 1997 Editors' Choice Awards.

== Reviews ==
- Power Unlimited - June 1998
