= Disney's Lilo & Stitch (GBA video game) =

2002 Game Boy Advance video game tie-in to Lilo & Stitch

- North American box art featuring Experiment 626/Stitch "tearing" the box art and Game Boy Advance label
- Developer: Digital Eclipse
- Publishers: NA: Disney Interactive; EU: Ubi Soft
- Director: Michael Mika Sr.
- Artist: Arvin Bautista
- Composer: Robert Baffy
- Series: Lilo & Stitch
- Platform: Game Boy Advance
- Release: NA: June 12, 2002; EU: October 4, 2002
- Genres: Platform, run and gun, stealth, tube shooter
- Mode: Single-player

Disney's Lilo & Stitch is a 2002 side-scrolling platform video game developed by Digital Eclipse for the Game Boy Advance. Based on the Disney animated film Lilo & Stitch, it was released in North America on June 7, 2002 by Disney Interactive, with Ubi Soft publishing the game in Europe on October 4, 2002.

== Gameplay ==
The game takes place after the film. An extraterrestrial bounty hunter kidnaps Lilo (vocal effects by Daveigh Chase) and brings her aboard the spaceship laboratory of a robotic, mosquito-like alien named Dr. Pestus, who plans to use her as food for his genetically-modified mosquito army. Stitch (vocal effects by Chris Sanders) must go out into space to rescue Lilo and defeat Dr. Pestus. In most levels, the player takes control of a four-armed, plasma blaster-wielding Stitch who must run and gun his way past enemies and various other obstacles to complete the level. He can also acquire special ammunition for his plasma blasters that allow him to fire more powerful plasma blasts and can acquire pineapple bombs to throw at enemies. In a couple puzzle-platform-styled levels, the player takes control of Lilo as she sneaks around the spaceship to find a way to escape and contact Stitch. In a couple tube shooter-styled segments, Stitch must fly a spaceship to reach the next level, shooting down other enemy ships and dodging obstacles along the way.

== Development ==
According to a 2023 interview with the game's director and present-day Digital Eclipse president Mike Mika, Digital Eclipse had developed so many licensed games for Disney and built up enough trust between them by close to Lilo & Stitch's release that Disney Interactive "stopped paying attention to [Digital Eclipse]". When Disney Interactive commissioned Digital Eclipse for a Lilo & Stitch video game, the developers decided to make one inspired by SNK's Metal Slug series. Upon seeing the game for themselves, executives at Disney Interactive were shocked at the level of violence and expressed concern that then-Disney CEO Michael Eisner would not approve of it. But there was no time left by then to make changes, as Disney Interactive had to show their upcoming catalog the next day. However, Eisner ended up loving the game, much to the relief of both Disney Interactive and Digital Eclipse, who were called by the former Disney division after the meeting. Lilo & Stitch film directors Chris Sanders and Dean DeBlois also sent Digital Eclipse a signed poster thanking them for making the game. The game features references to other video games, including Gyruss and Oddworld: Abe's Oddysee.

== Reception ==
Disney's Lilo & Stitch was met with mostly positive reviews, with critics favorably comparing the game to the Metal Slug series, but criticizing Stitch's inability to shoot while crawling or crouching and the game's use of a password save system. Critics also expressed concern that the game's high difficulty would frustrate its intended audience of young players. GameRankings gave the game an aggregated review score of 75.58% out of 100, while Metacritic gave it an aggregated score of 80.

=== Sales ===
In the United States, the game sold 620,000 copies and earned $14 million by August 2006. During the period between January 2000 and August 2006, it was the 46th highest-selling game launched for the Game Boy Advance, Nintendo DS or PlayStation Portable in that country.

== Sequel ==
In 2004, Disney Interactive released a standalone sequel developed by Climax Studios titled Lilo & Stitch 2: Hämsterviel Havoc, which is based on Lilo & Stitch: The Series.
