= Midway's Greatest Arcade Hits =

2000 video game

- Cover art for Volume 1
- Developer: Digital Eclipse
- Publisher: Midway
- Platforms: Dreamcast, Nintendo 64, Game Boy Advance
- Release: Dreamcast: NA: June 27, 2000; EU: July 28, 2000; Nintendo 64: NA: November 14, 2000; Game Boy Advance: NA: November 19, 2001; EU: November 30, 2001
- Genre: Various
- Mode: Single-player

Midway's Greatest Arcade Hits is a two-volume arcade game compilation developed by Digital Eclipse and published by Midway Games for the Dreamcast, Nintendo 64, and Game Boy Advance.

== Games included ==
The first volume was released in 2000 for the Dreamcast, Nintendo 64, in 2001 and Game Boy Advance. The Nintendo 64 and Dreamcast versions each featured two exclusive games. The second volume was only released on the Dreamcast the same year. A third volume was planned for release on Dreamcast but was later canceled.

Midway's Greatest Arcade Hits
Volume 1	Volume 2
Bubbles (1983) (Note: Exclusive to Dreamcast version.); Defender (1981); Defender II (1981); Joust (1982); Robotron: 2084 (1982); Sinistar (1982); Spy Hunter (1983) (Note: Exclusive to Nintendo 64 version.); Root Beer Tapper (1983)	720° (1986); Gauntlet (1985); Moon Patrol (1982); Paperboy (1985); Rampage (1986); Spy Hunter (1983)

== Reception ==
All versions of the compilation received generally mixed to negative reviews, with the first volume of the Dreamcast version earning a 64.00%, the second volume of the Dreamcast version earning a 70.00%, the Nintendo 64 version earning a 63.43%, and the Game Boy Advance version earning a 54.50%, according to video game aggregator GameRankings. The first volume of the Dreamcast version, the Game Boy Advance version, and the Nintendo 64 version were criticized for poor sound and visual emulation, especially the Game Boy Advance version. Developed by Pocket Games, rather than Digital Eclipse (the developer for the console titles), it featured missing voice samples, "shrunk" visuals in Sinistar, glitchy collision detection in Joust, and intense slowdown in Defender.

GamesMaster magazine's reviewer Robin Alway criticized the Dreamcast release of Volume 1, commenting that the extra features were sparse and illustrated a lack of effort on Midway's part. Regarding the games in collection, he commented that only Defender, Joust, and Robotron were the only "all-time classics" while the rest were inferior inclusions. However, Alway noted that older gamers would enjoy the nostalgia of seeing the titles. Alex Huhtala of Official Dreamcast Magazine was also critical of Volume 1 on the Dreamcast, echoing Alway's disappointment in Midway. Huhtala complained that the same compilation had been on other systems years ago, noting that the developer interviews were five years old. While he praised the accurate emulation, Huhtala described the visuals as dated and noted that the tiny pixels could cause headaches. He acknowledged the titles' historical significance but recommended that players unfamiliar with them should avoid the collection; however, he wrote that Defender's, Joust's, and Robotron's gameplay still hold up against contemporary standards. Huhtala summarized his review noting that the content was not worth the price.
