= Sinistar: Unleashed =

1999 action space shooter video game for Microsoft Windows

- Developer: GameFX
- Publisher: THQ
- Designers: Marc Michalik, Walter Wright
- Composers: Mashi Hasu, Ruediger Huber, John Benshop
- Platform: Microsoft Windows
- Release: NA: September 15, 1999
- Genre: Space shooter
- Modes: Single-player, multiplayer

Sinistar: Unleashed is a 1999 action space shooter video game for Microsoft Windows. It was designed by Marc Michalik and Walter Wright and developed at GameFX, a small studio composed of former members of Looking Glass Studios. Originally titled Out of the Void, development of the project began in 1997 and had no relationship with the Sinistar franchise. After licensing the franchise from Midway Games that year, GameFX shifted the focus of the game and developed it as a sequel to the original Sinistar, which was released by Williams in 1983.

Like the previous installment, Sinistar: Unleashed focuses on the destruction of the Sinistar, a large bio-mechanical machine, powered by machines called the Sporg. To achieve this goal, the player has a variety of starships, power-ups and weapons. Unlike its predecessor, the game has full three-dimensional graphics and a wider control scheme. Sinistar: Unleashed features 29 levels, five of which are hidden; each level has a Sinistar.

Sinistar: Unleashed received mixed reception when released. Critics lauded its audacity, as well as the addition of new features into the game. Several journalists felt that GameFX captured all the elements that represented a Sinistar game and stayed true to the franchise by feeling familiar to fans of the original game. However, critics faulted the boss designs and the repetitiveness of the gameplay.

== Gameplay ==
A screenshot of Sinistar: Unleashed, showcasing the player-controlled starship battling against a big bio-mechanical machine called the Sinistar, the primary enemy on each of the game's levels.

Like its predecessor, Sinistar: Unleashed is an action space shooter video game. While the original Sinistar features graphics and gameplay in a two-dimensional space, the sequel features three-dimensional graphics and gameplay, giving the player the ability to maneuver and roam freely across six different axes. Sinistar: Unleashed features twenty-nine levels, five of which are hidden as a bonus; each level has a Sinistar. The bonus levels are timed missions that involve destroying or protecting a particular object.

The player is given a starship, and the main mission is to fight an alien race called the Distilled Evil and their slaves, the Sporg. The Sporg are mining ships controlled by the Distilled Evil, tasked with powering the jumpgate, a portal through which the Sinistar (a bio-mechanical monster dedicated to destroying the player) appears. The jumpgate is stationed at the center of the level, and the Sporg power it with energy crystals collected from the asteroids that appear sparsely along the sector.

The player must prevent the Sporg from completely powering the jumpgate. While completing the task, the player encounters several warships that attempt to protect the jumpgate. These enemies are indicated on the radar with a dynamic set of coordinates that turn from white to red as they approach. If the player succeeds, the jumpgate breaks and the level is finished. Otherwise, the Sinistar will arrive through the activated jumpgate, and the player must defeat it to progress further. The player has six different starships to choose from, as well as eight power-ups and nine weapons to destroy the mining ships and the Sinistar. The most powerful weapon is called the Sinibomb, which is designed to defeat the Sinistar, although it can also be used to destroy the jumpgate. The player obtains Sinibombs by harvesting crystals from asteroids in the same way Sporg do.

== Development ==
Development of Sinistar: Unleashed, originally titled Out of the Void, began in 1997. It was handled by GameFX, a small game developer consisting of former members of Looking Glass Studios. It was initially designed to run only on a P200 with 3dfx acceleration, hardware which was beyond the reach of the average consumer at the time. Recognizing that the game could serve as a showpiece for their chip, 3dfx partnered with GameFX to support development. At first, the project had no connection, or gameplay similarities, to the Sinistar franchise. When the studio acquired the rights for the Sinistar franchise that year, it decided to refocus the development of the title to fit into the newly acquired property. It altered the game to introduce similarities to Sinistar, although the graphic structure remained unchanged.

THQ revealed that the game was optimized for the then-recently released Pentium III processors from Intel to allow the "lighting and geometry transformation engine to process more detail faster." In the Computer Gamer's Bible, Mark L. Chambers and Rob Smith noted the technical design of Sinistar: Unleashed, writing that "developers have added accurate collision physics, and mining the asteroid field will require precise timing and good trigger finger."

== Release ==
Sinistar: Unleashed was announced by THQ in February 1999, two years after the company licensed the Sinistar franchise from Midway Games. Two demos for the game were produced. The second, released in September 1999, included several gameplay and technical enhancements over the first, showcasing the initial two levels of the game.

When announcing the game, C. Noah Davis, chief technology officer of THQ and general manager of GameFX, said "What made the original a classic is that it was easy to learn, yet difficult to master." He elaborated: "We are focused on capturing that magic using many elements of the original, while showcasing the universe using our proprietary GameFX Technology." IGN reported on September 3, 1999 that the game had gone gold, and it was released on September 15.

== Reception ==
Reception

Aggregate score
Aggregator	Score
GameRankings	66%

Review scores
Publication	Score
AllGame	3/5
CNET Gamecenter	7/10
Computer Games Strategy Plus	3/5
Computer Gaming World	3.5/5
GamePro	2.5/5
GameSpot	6/10
IGN	7.5/10
Next Generation	3/5
PC Accelerator	6/10
PC Gamer (US)	55%
PC Zone	80%

Sinistar: Unleashed received average reviews according to the review aggregation website GameRankings. Critics agreed that the developers stayed true to the original game and lauded the graphic enhancements as "unquestionably beautiful" and a "graphical powerhouse". Erik Wolpaw, writing for GameSpot, noted that the game suffered mostly from gameplay issues, such as the control design, which he called "overly complex for a mindless shooter". He added that although the developers succeeded in capturing the arcade essence of the previous game, this was "somewhat to the detriment of the final product."

AllGame's reviewer was satisfied with the game's graphics but criticized how its bosses were designed, elaborating that "the Sinistars ... simply don't instill the same sense of sheer panic [as in the previous game]." Vincent Lopez of IGN noted the game's similarity to its predecessor and complimented its graphics and the addition of a wide variety of weapons as well as other technical features. However, he viewed the weapons as "more of a checklist than an actual asset." He stated that Sinistar: Unleashed "feels immediately familiar to fans of the original, while adding just enough new features (and a completely new graphic overhaul) to make this feel now-dated."

Nash Werner of GamePro shared Lopez's views, explaining that GameFX and THQ "have released a modern 3D version" of the original Sinistar that "sports some of the best graphics ever seen in a space shooter", although he added that it had lost "some of the soul" that the original game had. Caryn Law, writing for Computer Games Strategy Plus, applauded THQ for including the original game's elements and rendering them with "jazzing" graphics. She criticized the plot and gameplay design, stating that "players want games that involve more than simply blowing things up." She also contended that Sinistar: Unleashed "hearkens back to the days when all you needed was keen hand–eye coordination and a pocket full of quarters."

PC Zone praised the game, noting that "the rich, organic style lends the game a hypnotic atmosphere" and stating "with the Sinistars still taunting you as they did back in 1983, and the gameplay essentially unchanged, those who enjoyed the ageing classic will find Sinistar: Unleashed a worthy successor." John Lee, writing for NextGen, gave a somewhat mediocre review of the game, casting it as "a lot like one of those Baywatch babes—luscious to look at, but not much between the ears." He added that it was basically "another retro/nostalgia trip." GameSpy's Law concluded that Sinistar: Unleashed was "simply Sinistar dressed up in 3D graphics" and that it offered "nothing new in the way of a challenge."
