= Super High Impact =

1992 video game

- Sega Genesis version cover
- Developers: Sega Genesis: Iguana Entertainment; Super NES: Beam Software
- Publisher: Acclaim Entertainment (Note: Released under the Arena Entertainment brand name on Sega Genesis.)
- Platforms: Sega Genesis, Super NES
- Release: Sega Genesis: NA: 1992; Super NES: NA: June 1993
- Genre: Sports
- Modes: Single-player, Multiplayer

Super High Impact is a sports video game published by Acclaim Entertainment for the Sega Genesis in 1992 and SNES in 1993. It is a console version of the 1991 arcade video game High Impact Football by Williams Electronics. Upon release, the game received average reviews, with critics praising the game's visual presentation, animation and digitized voice, and faulting the game's simple design, playbook and lack of features.

== Gameplay ==
Gameplay screenshot of the Sega Genesis version.

The game is an arcade-style American football sports title in which players can compete in leagues of 18 fictional teams. Matches are played as single games, with players able to adjust the grass type, the length of the quarter in minutes and whether fighting is turned on and off. There are 16 and 28 offensive and defensive plays available in the playbook for the Genesis and SNES. The game offers one and two-player game modes, with two-player play available against each other or co-operation against the computer.

== Development and release ==
Super High Impact is a console version of the 1991 Williams Electronics arcade game High Impact Football. The developers, including co-designer Ed Boon and John Newcomer, artist Tony Goskie, and composer Dan Forden, began work on a sequel whilst conceiving of "ideas or improvements" whilst finishing the original game. Super High Impact is not NFL licensed; teams were fictional and based on cities that hosted NFL teams.

== Reception ==
Reception

Review scores
Publication	Score	
Publication	Sega Genesis	SNES
AllGame		2.5/5
Electronic Gaming Monthly		5/10, 6/10, 5/10, 4/10
Game Informer	9/10	
GamePro		3/5
VideoGames & Computer Entertainment	6.5/10	
Game Players		7/10

AllGame praised the game's "over-the-top" announcer, but faulted the "stiff" player animation, slow pace, overall lacking "enough features to keep you coming back". Although finding the game was not a "serious gridiron simulation" lacking "realism and rules", Game Players found Super High Impact fun to play and praised its graphics and digitised voices. Reviewers for Electronic Gaming Monthly disagreed on whether SNES version was an improvement on its arcade release, writing that the game was too simplistic and offered "little challenge". In contrast, GamePro felt the game was a "significant improvement" to the Genesis version, finding the graphics "smooth, sharp and detailed", and Game Informer felt the control and animation were "spectacular".
