= Williams Arcade's Greatest Hits =

1995 video game compilation

- North American Super NES cover art featuring the title screens for the compilation's five games
- Developer: Digital Eclipse
- Publishers: Williams Entertainment (Note: Saturn version released under the company's new name, Midway Home Entertainment.); Tiger (Game.com); THQ (PAL SNES and MD versions)
- Platforms: MS-DOS, Windows, Macintosh, PlayStation, Sega Genesis, Super NES, Sega Saturn, Game.com, Dreamcast
- Release: 1995: MS-DOS; NA: 1995 Windows; NA: 1996 PlayStation; NA: April 10, 1996 SNES; NA: October 1996; PAL: February 14, 1997 Genesis; NA: 1996; PAL: February 14, 1997 Saturn; NA: December 23, 1996 Game.com; NA: 1997 Dreamcast; NA: 2000
- Genre: Various
- Mode: Single-player

Williams Arcade's Greatest Hits is a video game compilation of Williams Entertainment's early arcade games from the golden age of arcade games. The title was created by Digital Eclipse, who developed a compiler to emulate the arcade games' source codes in order to recreate all aspects of the originals. Initially released for home computers in 1995 as Williams Arcade Classics, the compilation was ported to numerous console systems soon after. While most ports were published as Williams Arcade's Greatest Hits, the title was changed for several releases. The Sega Saturn version was released as Midway Presents Arcade's Greatest Hits, the handheld Game.com system was published under the original Williams Arcade Classics name, and the Dreamcast port was titled Midway's Greatest Arcade Hits Vol. 1.

The compilation consists of Defender, the publisher's seminal horizontal shooter; Defender II, the former title's updated sequel; Joust, a cooperative action game featuring knights on large flying birds; Robotron: 2084, a multidirectional shooter set in a fictional future world where robots have revolted against humans; Sinistar, another multidirectional shooter in which the player battles a giant anthropomorphic spacecraft; and Bubbles, an action game where the player uses a bubble to clean a kitchen sink. Historical information and developer interviews were also included. A few ports omitted Bubbles from the collection as well as the additional historical content.

Williams Arcade's Greatest Hits received a mixed reception by gaming publications, with the earlier releases praised more and the later Dreamcast version receiving considerably less favorable reviews. The selection of the titles—except for Bubbles, which received a wide range of responses—were frequently praised, as was the quality of the emulation. Defender, Joust, and Robotron were frequently lauded as the stand-out games in the collection. While the anthology's nostalgia was a frequent point of praise, the original arcade audiovisuals were often described as dated and critics recommended Williams Arcade's Greatest Hits predominantly for fans that grew up with the originals in arcades. The compilation was followed by the Midway Arcade Treasures product line, of which the first volume includes much of the same content among additional retro arcade games.

== Overview ==
The compilation allows players to select which game they want to play. The interface of the MS-DOS version (pictured) replicates an arcade room filled with arcade cabinets of the included titles.

As a compilation, Williams Arcade's Greatest Hits features several action games from Williams Electronics' early catalog from the golden age of arcade video games. From a selection screen, players can choose one of five to six games, depending on the platform. The anthology includes Defender, its sequel Defender II, Joust, Robotron: 2084, and Sinistar. Bubbles is included on the home computer, PlayStation, Saturn, and Dreamcast platforms. The same versions include background information and old promotional materials about the games as well as interviews with the original arcade developers.

Defender is a 1981 horizontally scrolling shooter game developed by Williams Electronics for arcades. The game is set on an unnamed planet where the player must defeat waves of invading aliens while protecting astronauts. Defender II, also known as Stargate, is the follow up to Defender released the same year featuring updated gameplay based on its predecessor. Joust is an action game featuring two-player cooperative gameplay that was released in 1982. Players assume the role of knights armed with lances and mounted on large birds, who must fly around the screen and defeat enemy knights riding buzzards.

Robotron: 2084 is a multidirectional shooter released in 1982 where the player must fight against endless waves of robots, rescue surviving humans, and earn as many points as possible. The game is set in the year 2084 in a fictional world where robots have turned against humans in a cybernetic revolt. Sinistar is a 1983 multidirectional shooter game in which the player controls a space pilot who battles the eponymous Sinistar, a giant anthropomorphic spacecraft. Bubbles is a 1983 action game where the player controls a bubble in a kitchen sink and must progress through levels by cleaning the sink while avoiding enemies.

== Development ==
Williams Arcade Classics was developed by Digital Eclipse for home computers: Macintosh, Windows, and MS-DOS. Digital Eclipse's president, Andrew Ayre, served as the title's producer while Brian Johnson, from Williams Entertainment, was the product manager. Williams' director of marketing, John Fowler, decided to release the compilation in order to appeal to people who had played the games as children. He expected that many of the people, who had become adults and parents since the games' original releases, would want to share their arcade experiences with their own children. Additionally, Williams' vice president of third-party development, Mike Rubinelli, felt this was an opportunity to introduce their popular classic games to new players. He believed that despite changes in video game trends, the elements that make games successful remained unchanged.

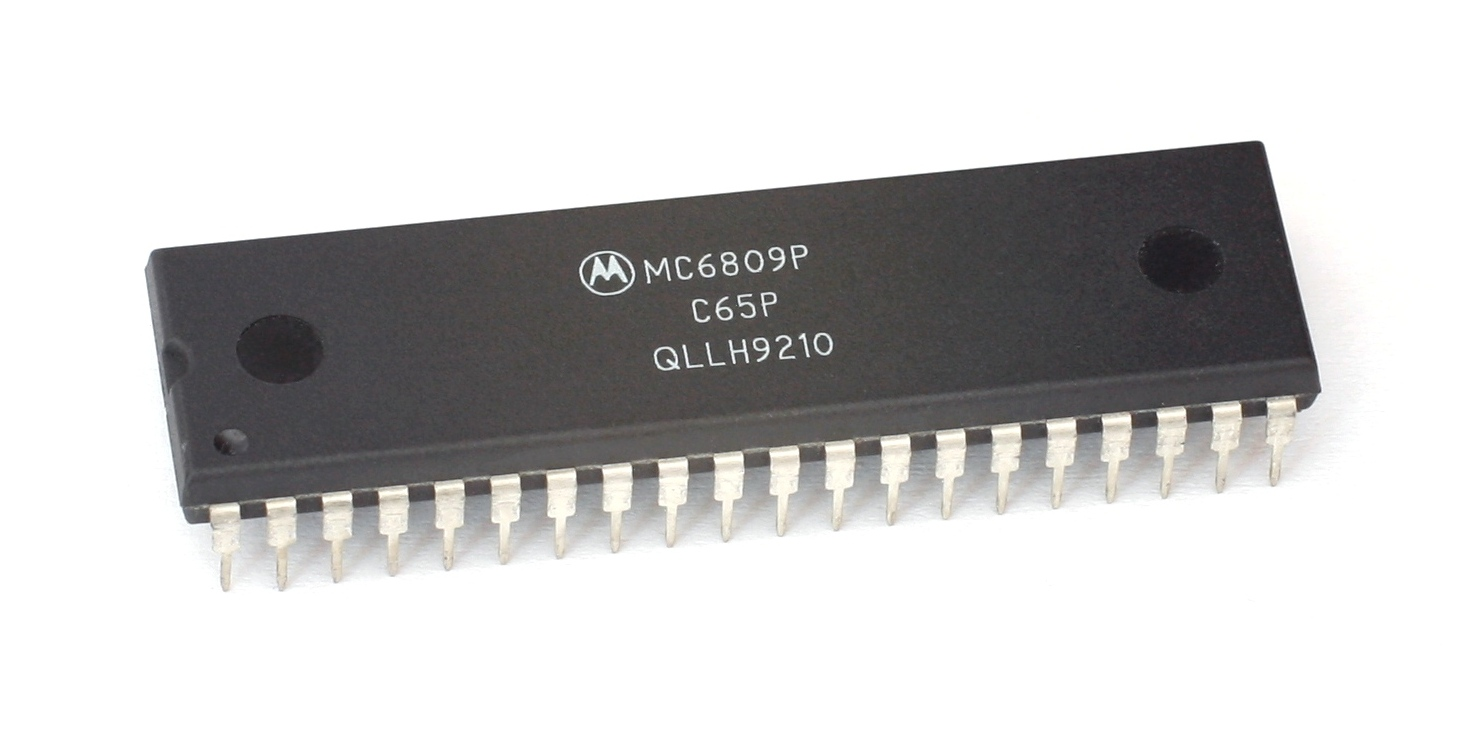
In order to utilize the games' original source code, Digital Eclipse developed a computer program to emulate the electronic hardware—including the Motorola 6809 microprocessor (pictured)—that Williams Entertainment used in its first arcade games from the early 1980s.

Digital Eclipse's team handled the bulk of the production. The developers obtained the original source code for the arcade games and aimed to accurately recreate them. To achieve this, the team chose to emulate the arcade hardware in order to replicate the original games' subtleties they felt encapsulated their unique gameplay experiences. Although computing hardware in the 1990s was more advanced and powerful than that from the early 1980s, remaking the source code for contemporary hardware requires programmers to reproduce every idiosyncrasy from the original, including unintentional software bugs, with a high attention to detail. The lead programmer, Jeff Vavasour, created a compiler that emulated the entire chipset of the hardware used in Williams' arcade games, including the Motorola 6809 microprocessor. William's early arcade games use hardware similar to that of Defender, its first video game. The emulation allowed the games to run in fullscreen mode without impacting the games' speed. However, alterations were necessary to account for a portion of the arcade monitor that was intentionally unused. The original Williams arcade releases feature an "overscan" area that the developers left devoid of content, resulting in a smaller game screen dimension. (Note: At the time, monitor hardware was often poorly calibrated, resulting in misaligned viewing areas when installed into cabinets. Including a buffer area ensured that all players would view the same game content.)

Despite working with more advanced hardware, the team still found emulating the original hardware challenging, specifically getting Joust to operate at an acceptable speed on the Windows 3.1 operating system running at 20MHz. Vavasour considered accurately emulating the audio an obstacle as well. Because the computer hardware at the time could not simultaneously emulate the games and synthesis the arcade sounds in real-time, Vavasour instead used a "pre-processing" technique to save an audio file to the computer's hard drive to be played when needed. The emulation software he created allowed him to isolate the individual sounds and their respective event triggers. With this information, the team created audio files from those sounds and adjusted the emulator to play the prefabricated sound at the appropriate time during gameplay.

When selecting the titles to include, the developers focused on highly recognizable games that would catch consumers' attention and aid in sales. Technical limitations were also a factor; as a general guideline, Vavasour aimed to develop on hardware that is ten times more powerful than the original in order to properly support the emulation's computing overhead. However, because several of Williams' games used similar hardware, the team was able to easily add Bubbles, a more obscure game, as a bonus title. Bert Monroy created the graphics used in the opening sequence featuring the arcade room, and Vavasour created the opening's animation. Game testing was handled by Williams' team of testers. Digital Eclipse conceived the idea to include supplemental materials and video interviews, something they would repeat for future projects. Chris Charla and Jon Synder of Flying Rhino Productions conducted the Behinds the Scenes interviews with the original arcade creators. An outside company, Midnight Design, handled the multimedia post-production for the Behind the Scenes portions. GT Interactive Software Corp. published the CD version for Windows machines. Previously in 1994, Williams Entertainment's subsidiary Midway Games entered into an agreement with GT Interactive Software to distribute Midway's PC titles.

== Console ports ==
Platform release timeline Platform name and the respective title
1995	Home computers as Williams Arcade Classics
1996	Sony PlayStation as Williams Arcade's Greatest Hits
1996	Super Nintendo Entertainment System as Williams Arcade's Greatest Hits
1996	Sega Genesis as Williams Arcade's Greatest Hits
1996	Sega Saturn as Midway Presents Arcade's Greatest Hits
1997	Game.com as Williams Arcade Classics
1998
1999
2000	Sega Dreamcast as Midway's Greatest Arcade Hits Vol. 1

After the home computer release, the developers ported the anthology to home console systems. The first port was to the PlayStation in 1996, with Ayre and Johnson returning as the executive producer and product manager, respectively. George and Peter Phillips handled the programming, while Vavasour shifted to an assistant producer role and consulted on arcade hardware. The PlayStation version contains a hidden CD audio track featuring sounds from Mortal Kombat 3. Video game magazines reported on it as a hidden tip, with Terry Minnich of Electronic Gaming Monthly baffled at the inclusion, speculating that it could be a clue pointing to another easter egg.

Sega Genesis and Super Nintendo Entertainment System (SNES) versions were also published in 1996, late into their respective console life cycles. Vavasour redesigned the selection screen and converted Defender, Defender II, Joust, and Robotron to play on the SNES. Christopher Burke converted Sinistar as well as programmed new features for the game. John Kowalski was responsible for converting the audio for the Nintendo console. The original arcade sounds were produced by a computer algorithm that fed data into a digital-to-analog converter. To match the audio frequency of those sounds, Kowalski wrote a translator program to convert the arcade's source code into the assembly language version used by the central processing unit for the Super Nintendo's audio subsystem. Nintendo of America promoted the game in a Nintendo Power magazine preview that highlighted the quality of the classic games' reproduction and the reduced list price due to the smaller memory requirements of the Game Pak. A few months later, the publication featured a multi-page overview of strategies for the anthology's games.

For the Sega Genesis port, Dan Filner converted Defender, Defender II, Sinistar, and Robotron as well as adapted Vavasour's selection screen, whereas George Phillips converted Joust. Digital Eclipse approached Filner, who was employed at Equilibrium, Inc. at the time, about working on the project and provided him a Genesis development kit as well as the source code for Defender. After reviewing the code, he began to cross-translate the original Motorola 6809 assembly code into assembly code for the Genesis's Motorola 68000 microprocessor. Filner completed the port of Defender in two weeks, after which the company successively assigned him to convert Stargate, Robotron, and then Sinistar. Peter Phillips and Terry Coatta adapted the audio to the Sega Genesis. Monroy again created the selection screen's artwork and external company Image Impressions converted the bulk of the title's visuals for both 16-bit ports. Williams promoted the Super Nintendo and Genesis ports at the 1996 E3 trade show, announcing a fall 1996 release window.

A port to the Sega Saturn was released under a different title, Midway Presents Arcade's Greatest Hits, (Note: Williams Electronics purchased Midway in 1988 and later transferred its games to the Midway Games subsidiary.) also in 1996. Ayre again produced the title, with Vavasour serving as the assistant producer and consultant for arcade hardware. John Stookey from Midway Home Entertainment was the associate producer. Digital Eclipse asked Filner to program this port as well. Given the technical differences between the Genesis and the Saturn, the company elected to emulate the arcade games, a task Filner had no experience with. Digital Eclipse staff coached him on how to approach the project. In 1997, Tiger Electronics released a version titled Williams Arcade Classics for its handheld console, the Game.com, which includes all the titles minus Bubbles. Similar to the Saturn release, the Dreamcast port was published under a new title in 2000: Midway's Greatest Arcade Hits Volume 1. Ayre was again the executive producer, with Michael Bilodeau and Marcus Lindblom serving as producers from Digital Eclipse and Midway Games, respectively. Programming was led by Dale Van Mol, while Vavasour was the technical director and emulation programmer. The credited artists include Monroy, Sebastion Hyde, and Boyd Burggrabe. Although the Dreamcast release includes the same content as the earlier PlayStation and Saturn ports, the Nintendo 64 version of Midway's Greatest Arcade Hits Volume 1 swapped Defender II and Bubbles for Spy Hunter and Root Beer Tapper.

== Reception ==
Reception

Review scores
Publication	Score
Electronic Gaming Monthly	PS1: 8.5/10, 7.5/10, 7/10, 8.5/10 (Note: Electronic Gaming Monthly magazine's four reviewers each provided an individual score out of 10.); GEN: 7/10, 8.5/10, 8/10, 8.5/10
GamesMaster	DC: 65%
IGN	PS1: 7/10
Mean Machines Sega	GEN: 90/100
Next Generation	PC: 4/5; MAC: 3/5; PS1: 4/5
Fort Worth Star-Telegram	PS1: 3.5/5
Maximum: The Video Game Magazine	PS1: 4/5
Official Dreamcast Magazine	DC: 3/10
Sega Saturn Magazine	SAT: 80%

Williams Arcade's Greatest Hits received a mixed reception, with each platform release receiving different responses. The early computer and PlayStation releases were generally well received, but the last release on the Dreamcast was criticized more. Staff for IGN, Edge, and GamePro drew comparisons to Namco Museum Vol. 1, which was released in North America for the PlayStation the same year.

Reviewing the PC version, Next Generation magazine staff praised the "arcade-perfect" conversions of the compilation's games, particularly the retention of the software bugs, which the reviewer felt were among the best features of the arcade originals. They noted the titles' historical importance to the video game industry and expressed admiration for the settings mode as well as the bonus multimedia material. The magazine staff also reviewed the Macintosh release, rating it a point lower than its PC counterpart. The reviewer noted the accurate reproduction and how enjoyable the games are, calling them "six of the greatest arcade classics", but wrote that players would lose interest after about half an hour.

The PlayStation version received overall positive reviews. Critics for Electronic Gaming Monthly, GamePro, and Maximum: The Video Game Magazine praised the arcade-perfect emulation of the games and the strong selection, generally concurring that most of the included games are classics that remain immensely fun. Electronic Gaming Monthly's four critics—Andrew Baran, Mark Lefebvre, Mike Desmond, and Sushi X—lauded the games' nostalgic enjoyment and accurate reproduction. However, Lefebvre noted that the original sounds are "scratchy and irritating". While all four recommended the compilation for arcade fans, Desmond commented that those unfamiliar with the games might not enjoy them. IGN's staff echoed similar statements about the emulation quality and the appeal towards older fans versus unfamiliar players. Tommy Glide of GamePro described Williams Arcade's Greatest Hits as a "true collectible" for retro gaming enthusiasts; conversely, he noted that younger players might be scared off. Glide considered all the games except for Bubbles, which he called "unique but mundane", a great value. Maximum's reviewer praised the replay value and challenge of all the games sans Bubbles, noting that those aspects elevated Williams Arcade's Greatest Hits above many of the PlayStation titles at the time. Developers from Iguana Entertainment ranked the PlayStation port as their sixth most wanted game in GameFan magazine's July 1996 guest section of its "Most Wanted" feature. Writing for the Fort Worth Star-Telegram, Malcom Mayhew noted the games' historical impact on modern games, praising the titles for their challenging yet fun gameplay. However, he described Bubbles as an exception, calling it lame.

Reviews for the Genesis version were more mixed. Four Electronic Gaming Monthly reviewers—Shawn Smith, Dan Hsu, Crispin Boyer, and Sushi-X—were enthusiastic about the arcade-perfect conversions and enjoyed the games but questioned Bubbles's omission. Smith scored the game the lowest of the four and expressed surprise that such a title would take long to release. While he noted the insignificance of a selection screen, Smith commented that the developers didn't appear to have spent much time on it, describing the screen as "lame". Hsu and Boyer both praised the individual games' gameplay but recommended playing Robotron with a six-button controller as the standard three-button controller made the game too difficult. Sushi-X considered the collection a technical achievement and expressed excitement at the ability to play these arcade titles on the portable Genesis Nomad. GamePro's Captain Cameron criticized the gameplay controls, calling them "hit-and-miss", and the compilation's lack of extras compared to Namco Museum. While he opined that the games are "average", Cameron singled out Robotron: 2084 as the best of the five "with its swarming enemies that create genuine suspense." Writing for Mean Machines Sega, Angus Swan and Matt Yeo praised the collection for its nostalgia and lasting playability. While the two described the visuals as “basic”, they praised the graphics' speed and quality replication. Similarly, the reviewers described the audio as "unremarkable" but "crisp".

Upon the Super Nintendo port's release, the title debuted on Nintendo Power's Top 20 SNES Power Chart at number twenty based on reader input. Although the magazine's staff described Arcade's Greatest Hits as a great value for "all-time favorite Arcade games", they rated the title lower than most other titles in terms of audiovisuals, challenge, gameplay, and enjoyment. However, three of the six review staff listed it as an "Editor Pick". Blockbuster Video reported the Super Nintendo port as the console's sixth top rented game in October 1996. Additionally, GamePro senior editor Lawrence Neves ranked it as the tenth "Can’t Miss Title" of the same month.

Rich Leadbetter gave Midway Presents Arcade's Greatest Hits a strong recommendation in Sega Saturn Magazine, saying that the gameplay design, originality, and challenge of the included games had held up well. Unlike most of the compilation's reviewers, he argued that Bubbles, though obscure, is solidly entertaining. Reviewing the Game.com port, Brett Alan Weiss of AllGame noted the "inherent limitations of a black-and-white handheld system" and commended the designers for utilizing the system to its limit. Despite the lack of color, he praised the accurate reproduction of the originals' audiovisuals but called the animation "choppy". Weiss summarized the collection's quality as "hit-and-miss"; he called Joust a near-perfect emulation while noting that the two Defender games experience slowdown and that the remaining titles are enjoyable but awkward to control.

GamesMaster magazine's reviewer Robin Alway criticized the Dreamcast release, commenting that the extra features were sparse and illustrated a lack of effort on Midway's part. Regarding the games in the collection, he commented that Defender, Joust, and Robotron were the only "all-time classics" while the rest were inferior inclusions. However, Alway noted that older fans would enjoy the nostalgia of seeing the titles. Alex Huhtala of Official Dreamcast Magazine was also critical of Midway's Greatest Arcade Hits Vol. 1 on the Dreamcast, echoing Alway's disappointment in Midway. Huhtala complained that the same compilation had been on other systems years ago, noting that the developer interviews were five years old. While he praised the accurate emulation, Huhtala described the visuals as dated and noted that the tiny pixels could cause headaches. He acknowledged the titles' historical significance but recommended that players unfamiliar with them should avoid the collection; however, he wrote that Defender's, Joust's, and Robotron's gameplay still hold up against contemporary standards. Huhtala summarized his review noting that the content was not worth the price.

== Legacy ==
Video game historians Henry Lowood and Raiford Guins attributed a resurgence of retrogaming via emulation in part to Digital Eclipse's work on Williams Arcade Classics in the mid-1990s. The company would go on to produce more compilations on various platforms. Midway later released a Game Boy Advance version of Midway's Greatest Arcade Hits in 2002. Developed by a different company, Pocket Studios, the collection features only Joust, Defender, Robotron 2084, and Sinistar. The publisher partnered with Digital Eclipse again in 2003 to release Midway Arcade Treasures, a multiplatform anthology of over 20 arcade titles, including the six games from the original Williams Arcade Classics. The company followed it with two additional compilation volumes.
