= Side-scrolling video game =

Video game genre

A speedrun of the side-scrolling platformer SuperTux

A side-scrolling video game (alternatively side-scroller) is a video game viewed from a side-view camera angle where the screen follows the player as they move left or right. The jump from single-screen or flip-screen graphics to scrolling graphics during the golden age of arcade games was a pivotal leap in game design, comparable to the move to 3D graphics during the fifth generation.

Hardware support of smooth scrolling backgrounds is built into many arcade video games, some game consoles, and home computers. Examples include 8-bit systems like the Atari 8-bit computers and Nintendo Entertainment System, and 16-bit consoles, such as the Super Nintendo Entertainment System and Sega Genesis. These 16-bit consoles added multiple layers, which can be scrolled independently for a parallax scrolling effect.

== History ==
=== Side-scrolling space/vehicle games (1977–1985) ===
Sega's Bomber was a side-scrolling shooter video game released for arcades in April 1977. Side-scrolling was later popularized by side-scrolling shoot 'em ups in the early 1980s. Defender, demonstrated by Williams Electronics in late 1980 and entering production in early 1981, allowed side-scrolling in both directions with wrap-around, extending the boundaries of the game world, while also including a mini-map radar. Scramble, released by Konami in early 1981, had continuous scrolling in a single direction and was the first side-scroller with multiple distinct levels.

The first scrolling platform game was Jump Bug, a platform-shooter released in 1981. Players controlled a bouncing car and navigated it to jump on various platforms like buildings, clouds, and hills. While it primarily scrolls horizontally, one section includes coarse vertical scrolling. Taito's first attempt at a side-scrolling platformer was the arcade game Jungle King (1982), later altered and renamed to Jungle Hunt due to legal controversy over similarities to Tarzan.

The side-scrolling format was enhanced by parallax scrolling, which gives an illusion of depth. The background images are presented in multiple layers that scroll at different rates, so objects closer to the horizon scroll slower than objects closer to the viewer. Some parallax scrolling was used in Jump Bug. It used a limited form of parallax scrolling with the main scene scrolling while the starry night sky is fixed and clouds move slowly, adding depth to the scenery. The following year, Irem's Moon Patrol (1982) implemented a full form of parallax scrolling, with three separate background layers scrolling at different speeds, simulating the distance between them. Moon Patrol is often credited with popularizing parallax scrolling. Jungle Hunt also had parallax scrolling and was released the same month as Moon Patrol in June 1982.

Activision published two side-scrolling racing games for the Atari VCS in 1982: the biplane-based Barnstorming and the top-view Grand Prix. By 1984, there were other racing games played from a side-scrolling view, including Nintendo's Excitebike SNK's Jumping Cross. and Mystic Marathon from Williams Electronics, a footrace between fantasy creatures.

In 1985, Konami's side-scrolling shooter: Gradius gave the player greater control over the choice of weaponry, thus introducing another element of strategy. The game also introduced the need for the player to memorize levels in order to achieve any measure of success. Gradius, with its iconic protagonist, defined the side-scrolling shoot 'em up and spawned a series spanning several sequels.

=== Side-scrolling character action games (1984–1995) ===
In the mid-1980s, side-scrolling character action games (also called "side-scrolling action games" or side-scrolling "character-driven" games) emerged, combining elements from earlier side-view, single-screen character action games, such as single-screen platform games, with the side-scrolling of space/vehicle games, such as scrolling space shoot 'em ups. These new side-scrolling character-driven action games featured large characters sprites in colorful, side-scrolling environments, with the core gameplay consisting of fighting large groups of weaker enemies, using attacks/weapons such as punches, kicks, guns, swords, ninjutsu or magic.

The most notable early example was Irem's Kung-Fu Master (1984), the first and most influential side-scrolling martial arts action game. It adapted combat mechanics similar to single-screen fighting game Karate Champ (1984) for a side-scrolling format, along with adapting elements from two Hong Kong martial arts films, Bruce Lee's Game of Death (1973) and Jackie Chan's Wheels on Meals (1984), and had elements such as end-of-level boss battles as well as health meters for the player character and bosses.

The side-scrolling character action game format was popular from the mid-1980s to the 1990s. Popular examples included ninja action games such as Taito's The Legend of Kage (1985) and Sega's Shinobi (1987), beat 'em up games such as Technōs Japan's Renegade (1986) and Double Dragon (1987), and run and gun video games such as Namco's Rolling Thunder (1986) and Treasure's Gunstar Heroes (1993). Legend of Kage notably had levels that extend in all directions, while maintained a side-view format. On home computers, such as the martial arts game Karateka (1984) successfully experimented with adding plot to its fighting game action, and was also the first side-scroller to include cutscenes.

Character action games also include scrolling platform games like Super Mario Bros. (1985), Sonic the Hedgehog (1991) and Bubsy (1993). Super Mario Bros. in particular, released for the Nintendo Entertainment System (NES) console, had a significant impact on the game industry, establishing the conventions of the scrolling platform genre and helping to reinvigorate the North American home video game market (which had crashed in 1983). It combined the platform gameplay of Donkey Kong (1981) and Mario Bros. (1983) with side-scrolling elements from the racer Excitebike and the beat 'em up Kung-Fu Master, and was more expansive than earlier side-scrollers, striking a balance between arcade-like action and longer play sessions suited for home systems.

==== Beat 'em ups ====
In 1984, Hong Kong cinema-inspired Kung-Fu Master laid the foundations for side-scrolling beat 'em ups, by simplifying the combat of Karate Champ and introducing numerous enemies along a side-scrolling playfield. In 1986, Technōs Japan's Nekketsu Kōha Kunio-kun introduced street brawling to the genre. The Western adaptation Renegade (released the same year) added an underworld revenge plot that proved more popular with gamers than the principled combat sport of other games. Renegade set the standard for future beat 'em up games as it introduced the ability to move both horizontally and vertically.

In 1987, the release of Double Dragon ushered in a "Golden Age" for the beat 'em up a genre that lasted nearly 5 years. The game was designed as Technos Japan's spiritual successor to Renegade, but it took the genre to new heights with its detailed set of martial arts attacks and its outstanding two-player cooperative gameplay. Double Dragon's success largely resulted in a flood of beat 'em ups that came in the late 1980s, where acclaimed titles such as Golden Axe and Final Fight (both 1989) distinguished themselves from the others. Final Fight was Capcom's intended sequel to Street Fighter (provisionally titled Street Fighter '89), but the company ultimately gave it a new title. Acclaimed as the best game in the genre, Final Fight spawned two sequels and was later ported to other systems. Golden Axe was acclaimed for its visceral hack and slash action and cooperative mode and was influential through its selection of multiple protagonists with distinct fighting styles. It is considered one of the strongest beat 'em up titles for its fantasy elements, distinguishing it from the urban settings seen in other beat 'em ups.

==== Scrolling platform games ====
In 1984, Pac-Land took the scrolling platform game a step further. It was not only a successful title, but it more closely resembled later scrolling platformers like Wonder Boy and Super Mario Bros. It also has multi-layered parallax scrolling. The same year, Sega released Flicky, a simple platformer with horizontally scrolling levels and first mascot character. Namco followed up Pac-Land with the fantasy-themed Dragon Buster the following year.

Nintendo's platform game Super Mario Bros., designed by Shigeru Miyamoto and released for the Nintendo Entertainment System in 1985, became the archetype for many scrolling platformers to follow. It established many of the conventions of the side-scrolling platform genre and struck a balance between arcade-like action and longer play sessions suited for home systems, helping to reinvigorate the North American home video game market. Compared to earlier platformers, Super Mario Bros. was more expansive, with the player having to "strategize while scrolling sideways" over long distances across colorful levels aboveground as well as underground. Its side-scrolling elements were influenced by two earlier side-scrollers that Miyamoto's team worked on, the racer Excitebike and the NES port of beat 'em up Kung-Fu Master. It used the same game engine as Excitebike, which allowed Mario to accelerate from a walk to a run, rather than move at a constant speed like earlier platformers.

Super Mario Bros. went on to sell over 40 million copies according to the 1999 Guinness Book of World Records. Its success contributed greatly to popularizing the genre during the 8-bit console generation. Sega attempted to emulate this success with their Alex Kidd series, as well as with the Wonder Boy series. The later Wonder Boy games were also notable for combining adventure and role-playing elements with traditional platforming.

==== Run and gun ====
In 1984, Hover Attack for the Sharp X1 was an early run & gun shooter that freely scrolled in all directions and allowed the player to shoot diagonally as well as straight ahead. 1985 saw the release of Thexder, a breakthrough title for platform shooters.

Run and gun video games became popular during the mid-to-late 1980s, with titles such as Konami's Green Beret (1985) and Namco's Rolling Thunder (1986). 1987's Contra was acclaimed for its multi-directional aiming and two-player cooperative gameplay. However, by the early 1990s and with the popularity of 16-bit consoles, the scrolling shooter genre was overcrowded, with developers struggling to make their games stand out.

=== IBM PC compatibles ===
Side-scrolling was a well-known phenomenon in arcades, and home computer and console games of the 1980s, as they often possessed hardware optimized for the task like the Atari 8-bit computers and Famicom, but IBM compatibles did not. Smooth scrolling on IBM PCs using the Color Graphics Adapter was a challenge for developers. There were a small number of IBM PC compatible ports of smooth scrolling arcade games in the early 1980s, including Moon Patrol and Defender. The second version of Sopwith, released in 1986, also had smooth scrolling.

In 1990 John Carmack, then working for Softdisk, combined horizontal smooth scrolling feature of the Enhanced Graphics Adapter with a software technique he called adaptive tile refresh. It was demonstrated in the proof-of-concept game Dangerous Dave in Copyright Infringement, which was a clone of the first level of Super Mario Bros. 3, but with Mario replaced by the character Dangerous Dave of earlier Softdisk games. This led Carmack and others at Softdisk to resign and form their own company, id Software. Id Software released Commander Keen the same year, which was the first publicly available MS-DOS platform game with smoothly-scrolling graphics.

== See also ==
- 2.5D
- Flip-screen
- Parallax scrolling
- Scrolling
- Vertically scrolling video game
- Platformer

== Sources ==
- Steven L. Kent (2001). The Ultimate History of Video Games. ISBN 9780761536437.
