= Joust (video game) =

1982 video game

- Advertisement depicting a player with the upright arcade cabinet featuring artwork by Python Anghelo
- Developer: Williams Electronics
- Publishers: Williams Electronics: 2600, 5200, Atari 8-bit Atari, Inc. Apple II Atarisoft Atari ST, 7800, Lynx Atari Corporation NES; NA: HAL America; JP: HAL Laboratory Game Boy Nintendo
- Designer: John Newcomer
- Programmer: Bill Pfutzenreuter
- Artists: Jan Hendricks; Python Anghelo
- Platform: Arcade: Atari 2600, Atari 5200, Atari 8-bit, Apple II, Atari ST, Atari 7800, NES, Atari Lynx, Macintosh, Game Boy
- Release: September 1982: Arcade; NA: September 1982; EU: January 1983; JP: 1984 2600, 5200; October 1983 Atari 8-bit; January 1984 Apple II; Mid-1984 7800; May 15, 1986 NES; JP: October 30, 1987; NA: October 1988 Game Boy; NA: October 1995; EU: 1995
- Genre: Action
- Modes: Single-player, multiplayer

Joust is a 1982 action game developed and published by Williams Electronics for arcades. Players assume the role of knights armed with lances and mounted on large birds (an ostrich for Player 1 and a stork for Player 2). They progress through levels, which consist of a single screen filled with floating platforms, by defeating enemy knights riding buzzards and other opponents.

Using the computer hardware from the company's earlier arcade game, Defender, John Newcomer led the development team: Bill Pfutzenreuter, Janice Woldenberg-Miller (née Hendricks), Python Anghelo, Tim Murphy, and John Kotlarik. Newcomer aimed to create a flying game, with cooperative two-player gameplay, while avoiding the overdone space theme. After deciding to use birds as characters, he forwent the standard eight-direction joystick control scheme and devised collisions as the means of combat.

The game was well-received by players and critics, and the mechanics influenced other games. Praise focused on the unique premise and enjoyable gameplay. While not the first two-player cooperative video game, Joust's success and polished implementation helped popularize the concept. It was followed by a less popular arcade sequel in 1986: Joust 2: Survival of the Fittest. While Joust was ported to numerous home systems and included in several multiplatform retro game anthologies, efforts to adapt it to other media and create updated video game remakes have been fruitless.

== Gameplay ==
The player navigates the yellow knight (top center) around the game world to defeat the enemy knights. Scores and available lives are kept track in the bottom platform. An egg from a defeated knight rests on the middle right platform.

Joust is a platforming game where the player controls a yellow knight riding a flying ostrich (player 1) or a stork (player 2) from a third-person perspective. The player navigates around the game world, which consists of rock platforms floating above a flat island surrounded by lava, via two-way joystick and a button. Home console versions, however, use game controllers with directional pads and analog sticks. The joystick controls the horizontal direction that the knight travels, while pressing the button flaps the ostrich’s wings. The rate at which the player repeatedly presses the button directly determines the bird's ascension, allowing the character to fly upward, hover, or slowly descend. When traveling off the screen to either side, the character will continue its path reappearing from the opposite side.

The objective is to defeat groups of enemy knights riding buzzards that populate each level, referred to as a "wave". Upon completing a wave, a subsequent, more challenging one will begin. Players pilot the knight to collide with enemies. The higher of two jousting lances is the winner, whereas a collision of equal height repels the characters apart. A defeated enemy will turn into an egg that falls toward the bottom of the screen, which a player can collect for points. If the player does not collect the egg, it will hatch into a new knight that gains a new mount and must be defeated again. The game features three type of enemy knights—Bounder, Hunter, and Shadow Lord—that are separate colors and are worth different amounts of points. A pterodactyl will appear after a predetermined time frame to hunt the hero. Players can defeat the pterodactyl for bonus points. An indestructible Lava Troll will grab any character flying too low over the lava and drags them into the lava. Losing a clash against an opponent or contact with lava deducts an available game life; the game ends when all game lives are expended. A second player can join the game, controlling a blue knight on a stork. The two players cooperatively complete the waves, optionally attacking each other.

== Development ==
Joust was developed by Williams Electronics, with John Newcomer as the lead designer. The development also included programmer Bill Pfutzenreuter, artists Janice Woldenberg-Miller and Python Anghelo, and audio designers Tim Murphy and John Kotlarik. The game features amplified monaural sound and raster graphics on a 19-inch color CRT monitor. Like other Williams arcade games, Joust was programmed in assembly language. A pack of three AA batteries provide power to save the game's settings and high scores when the machine is unplugged from an electrical outlet. Anghelo stenciled the cabinet artwork on a wooden frame, and designed artwork for promotional materials. One such flyer features archaic English, which was also incorporated into the game's onscreen instructions and game-over message.

=== Conception ===
Following the success of the 1981 game Defender, Williams searched for new creative staff. John Newcomer, believing video games to be the future of entertainment, left his job as a toy designer to work at Williams, who hired him to create game ideas as support for development staff. After a few days, he generated a list of ideas that included ideas for his top two games, The War of the Worlds and Joust. Technical specifications dictated the selection because his vision of The War of the Worlds was technologically infeasible, whereas Joust could be accomplished with hardware already available at Williams. A development team was formed, which decided to create the game using Defender's hardware.

Newcomer conceived Joust as a "flying game" with cooperative two-player gameplay, but he did not wish to emulate the popular space theme of previous successful flying games like Asteroids and Defender. To that end, he made a list of things that could fly: machines, animals, and fictional characters. After evaluating the positive and negative of each idea, Newcomer chose birds for their wide appeal and his familiarity with fantasy and science fiction media featuring birds. To further increase his understanding, Newcomer went to the library to study mythology. He believed that the primary protagonist should ride a majestic bird. The first choice was an eagle, but the lack of graceful land mobility dissuaded him. Instead, he decided that a flying ostrich was more believable than a running eagle. To differentiate between the first and second player characters, the developers picked a stork, believing the proportions were similar to an ostrich while the color difference would avoid confusion among players. Newcomer chose vultures as the main enemies, believing that they would be recognizably evil. Anghelo created concept art of the characters as guidance for further design.

=== Design ===
At the time Joust was done I was hoping to get a broader audience who may want to try a different skill. There were already plenty of shooting games they could play. I wanted to break some new ground. I felt I was already giving the player new things to do like having to flap, run and become so adept at flying that it would be the determining factor in how you collided and defeated an enemy. The cleanest thing I could think of to visually determine a winner was height.

— John Newcomer on the premise and gameplay of Joust

The decision to use birds prompted Newcomer to deviate from the standard eight-direction joystick. He implemented a flapping mechanism to allow players to control the character's ascent and descent. With the vertical direction controlled via the arcade cabinet's button, a two-way joystick was added to dictate horizontal direction. Though other Williams employees were concerned about the design, Newcomer believed that a direct control scheme for flight would strengthen the connection between the player and the character. The combat was devised to allow for higher levels of strategy than traditional shooting games. Because flying became an integral gameplay element, he chose to have characters collide as a means of combat, with victory decided by onscreen elevation.

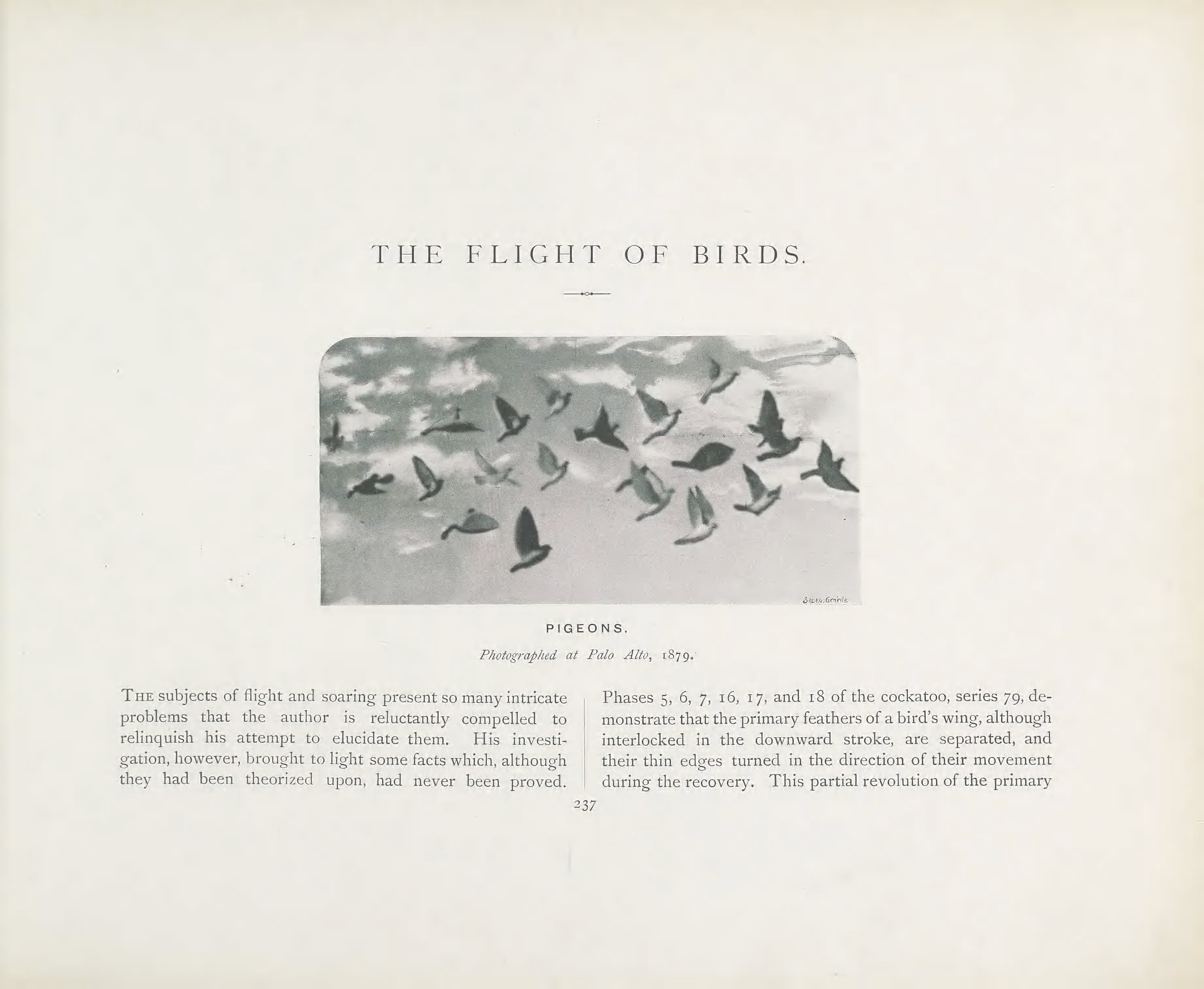
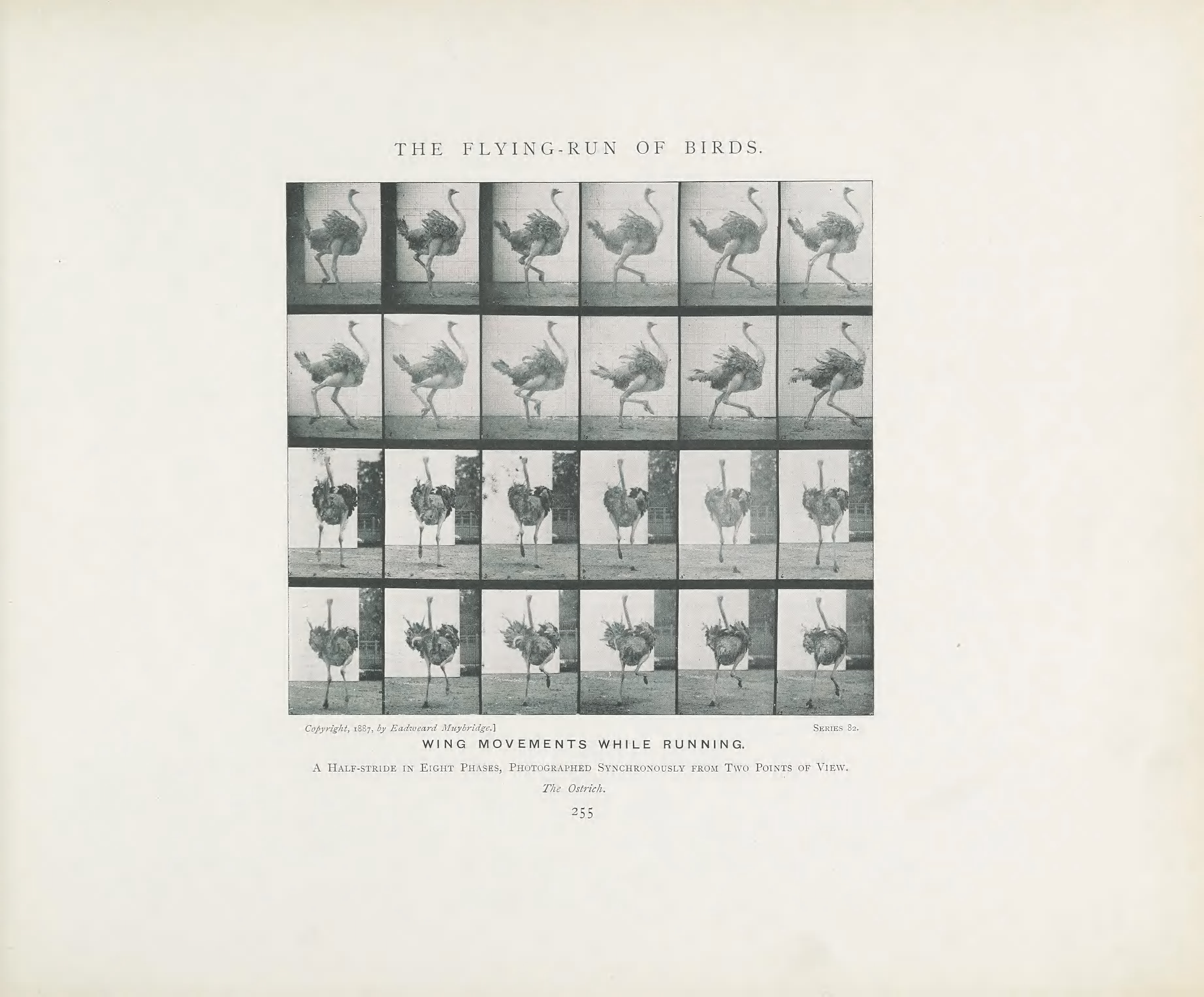
When animating the bird sprites in Joust, artist Janice Woldenberg-Miller referenced Eadweard Muybridge's 1902 book Animals In Motion, which includes a section on birds. The chapter features sequential photographs of various birds in motion as seen from the front and side.

The developers created the game using 96K of ROM chip storage, which limited the data size of individual graphics and sound effects they could use. The ROM size limits also prohibited Newcomer from creating more characters. The graphics are hand-animated pixel art. To animate the birds, Woldenberg-Miller referenced Eadweard Muybridge's book Animals In Motion. Given the limited memory, she had to balance the number of frames (to minimize file size) while maintaining realistic animation. Woldenberg-Miller initially chose gray for the buzzards' appearance but changed it to green to optimize the color palette as the developers had only 16 colors to create the entire display. Once the colors were decided for the character sprites, Newcomer finalized the look of the platforms. The hardware had limited audio capabilities, and sounds typically require larger amounts of memory than graphics. Working with these restrictions, Newcomer instructed Murphy and Kotlarik to focus on select sounds he deemed important to reinforcing gameplay. He reasoned that the audio would serve as conspicuous hints that players could use to adjust their strategy. Newcomer prioritized the crucial wing-flap sound above others related to the pterodactyl, collisions, and hatching eggs.

In designing the levels, Newcomer added platforms to the environment after the combat was devised. A static game world was chosen, instead of a scrolling world, to focus on detailed visual textures applied to the platforms; the hardware could not easily display the textures while scrolling, and the team believed that displaying the whole environment would aid players. The final game world element designed was a lava pit and a hand reaching out of it to destroy characters too close to the bottom of the screen. Newcomer placed the platforms to optimize Pfutzenreuter's enemy artificial intelligence (AI), which was programmed for attack patterns based partly on platform placements. The knight enemies were designed to exhibit progressively more aggressive behavior. Bounders fly around the environment randomly, occasionally reacting to the protagonist. Hunters seek the player's character in an effort to collide. Shadow Lords fly quickly and closer to the top of the screen; Pfutzenreuter designed them to fly higher when close to the protagonist to increase the Shadow Lord's chances of victory against players. The pterodactyl was designed to prevent players from idling and to be difficult to defeat. The enemy's only vulnerability is its open mouth during a specific animation frame, and it quickly flies upward at the last moment when approaching a player waiting at the edge of a platform. The game prioritizes its graphics processing to favor the player characters over the enemies, so enemies begin to react more slowly when the number of on-screen sprites increases.

While playtesting the game, the team discovered an animation bug they described as a "belly flop". The flaw allowed players to force the ostrich or stork sprite through an otherwise impassable small gap between two adjacent platforms of very close elevation. Because it provided an interesting method to perform a sneak attack on an opponent below the gap, and because of limited time available, the developers decided to keep the defect as an undocumented feature rather than fix it. A second bug, which allows the pterodactyl to be easily defeated, was discovered after the game was first distributed. Newcomer designed the game and its AI with each sprite's dimension in mind. A day before the game was finished, however, the pterodactyl's sprite was altered to improve the appearance. The new sprite allowed the pterodactyl to be easily defeated by waiting at a ledge. Upon learning of the flaw, Williams shipped a new ROM for the arcade cabinets to assuage distributors' complaints.

== Release ==
Williams first released Joust into arcades in September 1982. The company filed the stylized logo with the United States Patent and Trademark Office on September 27, 1982. The same day, it registered Joust's program, visuals, and cabinet artwork with the United States Copyright Office.

Given the peculiar control scheme, Williams was concerned that the game would be unsuccessful, and arcades were hesitant to purchase the game. Williams eventually shipped 26,000 units. A cocktail table version was later released, engineered by Leo Ludzia. It is unique among cocktail games with its side-by-side seating rather than opposing sides, which allowed Williams to reuse the same ROM chip from the upright cabinets. With substantially fewer units manufactured (between 250-500 units) than the upright arcade machine, the cocktail version is a rare collector's item.

=== Home ports ===
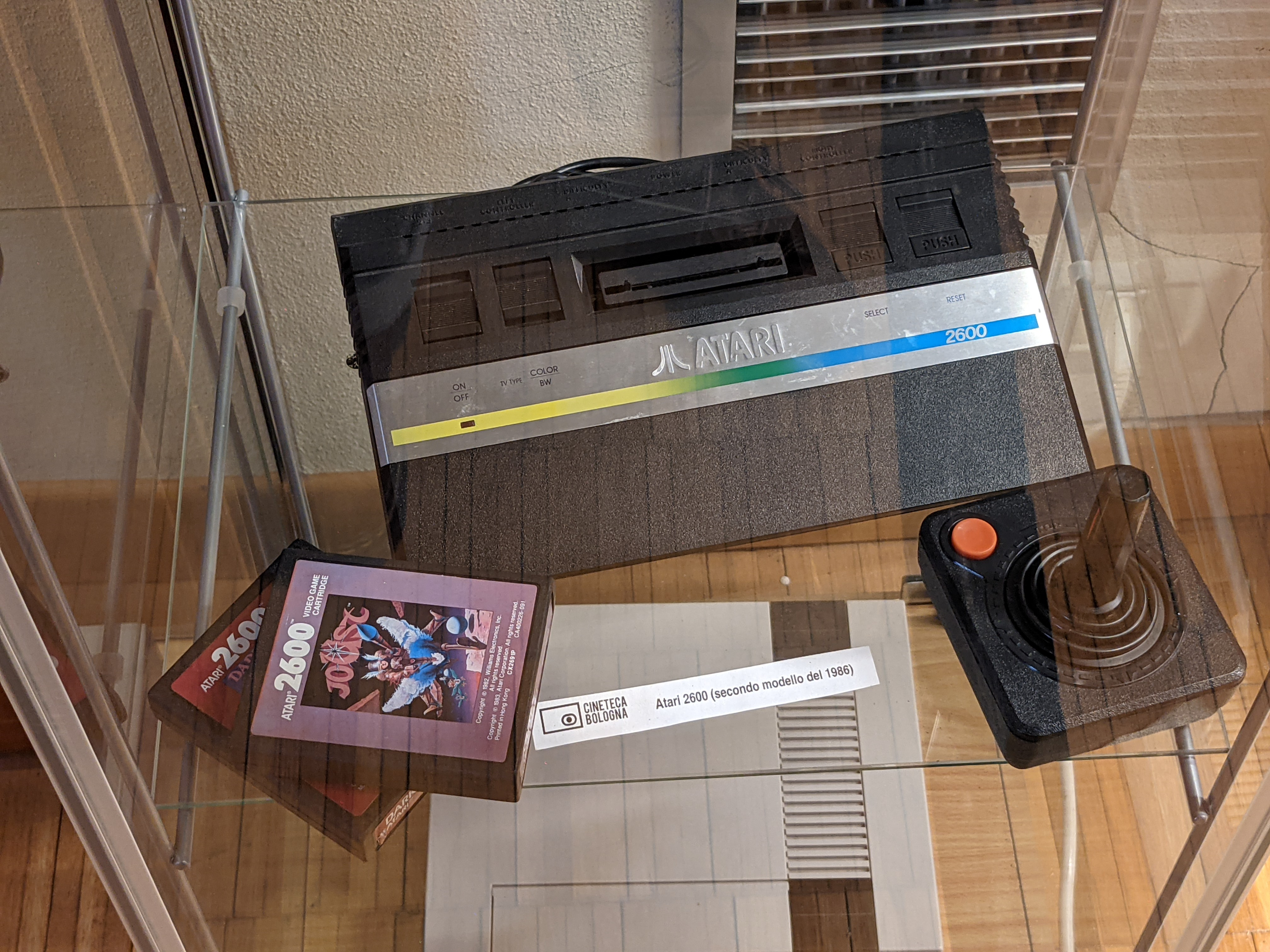
Atari 2600 home console with a Joust cartridge at the Renzo Renzi Library, Cineteca di Bologna

Soon after its arcade release, Atari, Inc. acquired the licensing rights to release home ports of Joust. The company published ports on its own systems: the Atari 2600, Atari 5200, and Atari 7800 home consoles as well as Atari 8-bit computers. Atari also released the game on the Apple II and personal computers under its Atarisoft label. While Atari was negotiating a deal with Nintendo in 1983 to distribute the soon-to-be released Famicom console and games outside Japan, Satoru Iwata of HAL Laboratory approached Nintendo about developing for its new console. After meeting with Nintendo, Iwata was tasked with converting Joust for the Famicom, a project he completed in two months. However, the deal between Atari and Nintendo collapsed, and the Famicom port was shelved until 1987, when HAL Laboratory was able to publish it in Japan. A North American version for the Nintendo Entertainment System followed the next year.

A BBC Micro version was in development in 1984, programmed by Delos Harriman. However, it was unfinished when the Atarisoft label was discontinued. (Note: In 1984, Warner Communications, Atari's parent company, sold parts of the video game company, including the Atarisoft division, to Jack Tramiel.) Aardvark Software picked up development and finished the game in 1985, but after the company appeared to disappear, the port remained unreleased until Harriman began selling it the next year. A new company, Go-Dax, later released a clone titled Skirmish in 1988 for the BBC Micro and Acorn Electron home computers. Harriman was credited as the creator of Skirmish in Acorn User magazine's coverage of other Go-Dax games. A port for the ColecoVision was also in production under the Atarisoft label; however, development ceased after a prototype was created. It was unavailable until CGE Services reproduced the prototype cartridges for release at the 2001 Classic Gaming Expo in Las Vegas.

Williams Entertainment (Note: Williams Electronics changed its name to WMS Industries in 1987, and after acquiring Tradewest in 1994, WMS Industries renamed the new subsidiary Williams Entertainment to release home ports of its arcade games.) would later include Joust in several of its multiplatform arcade compilations over a decade after its initial release: the 1995 Williams Arcade's Greatest Hits, the 2000 Midway's Greatest Arcade Hits, the 2003 Midway Arcade Treasures, and the 2012 Midway Arcade Origins. Additional compilations are the 1995 Arcade Classic 4 for the Game Boy, the 2005 Midway Arcade Treasures: Extended Play for the PlayStation Portable, and the 2022 Midway Legacy Edition Arcade1Up cabinet. Many of the anthologies were created by Digital Eclipse, who used emulation to run the original source code. The company included Joust because of its high recognizability. In 2000, a web-based version of Joust, along with nine other classic arcade games, was published on Shockwave.com. Four years later, Midway Games (Note: WMS Industries purchased Midway in 1988 and later transferred its games to the Midway Games subsidiary.) launched a website featuring the Shockwave versions. A mobile phone version was released in 2005, but omitted the flapping control scheme. Joust was released via digital distribution in 2007 on GameTap, Xbox Live Arcade, and the PlayStation Network. Joust, along with many other Midway arcade games, appear in the 2016 Midway Arcade Level Pack expansion of Lego Dimensions. The developer, Traveller's Tales, considered recreating them in Lego form but decided to present them in their original forms to maintain what they felt made the games good. Lego versions of Joust characters appear outside the emulated games in the expansion's virtual Lego world. In 2021, the game joined other classic arcade games on the Antstream Arcade gaming platform. It left the service in 2023 after the licensing agreement expired.

== Reception ==
Reception

Review scores
| Publication | Score |
|---|---|
| AllGame | Arcade: 5/5; Atari 7800: 4/5; NES: 2.5/5 |
| Computer and Video Games | Atari 2600: 83% |
| Tilt | Arcade: 4/6 |
| Play Meter | Arcade: 4/4 |

Award
| Publication | Award |
|---|---|
| Electronic Games | Best Arcade-to-Home Translation (1984) |

A few months after its release, Joust topped the United States Play Meter arcade charts in January 1983; a feat it repeated on the RePlay upright arcade cabinet charts from January to February 1983. It was among the thirteen highest-grossing arcade games of 1983 in the United States, which made it a "Most Played Video Game" nominee for the Amusement & Music Operators Association's annual awards. The game was met with acclaim by contemporary video game publications. Roger Sharpe of trade magazine Play Meter lauded the gameplay and described it as a "solid performer" that encourages repeat play. He praised the audiovisuals, noting that the such level of quality has become William's standard. Sharpe further described the presentation as a surprising and imaginative combination of elements. Electronic Games staff described it as "tremendously popular". Olivier Chazoule of French magazine Tilt rated the arcade game favorably, noting the two player gameplay and fantasy setting. A writer for Video Gaming Illustrated called Joust "exotic" with lifelike animation. Computer and Video Games staff called the game "weird and wonderful". Years later, they praised the accuracy of the Atari 2600 port, calling the gameplay "challenging and addictive".

The ports also received a positive contemporary reception. Antic magazine writers called the Atari 8-bit version a "unique, addictive arcade game" that was "almost identical" to the original. The staff concluded that Joust was "Atari's finest since Star Raiders" in 1980. Writing for the Reading Eagle newspaper, Steve Stecklow lauded the similarity to the original arcade, which he noted as "one of the biggest arcade hits" in 1983 because of its "odd and original" design. For its 1985 Arkie Awards, Electronic Games staff named Joust the "Best Arcade-to-Home Translation" of 1984 for Atari's faithful reproduction of the visuals across several platforms. They further praised the game for being in tune with the multiplayer trend at the time and the premise's "classic appeal". Its inclusion in the various releases of Williams Arcade's Greatest Hits was well received by gaming publications. Weiss considered Joust the stand-out title of the Game.com release, calling it a near-perfect emulation. Alex Huhtala of Official Dreamcast Magazine praised the accurate emulation of the Dreamcast port and Joust's gameplay for holding up against contemporary standards. GamesMaster magazine's reviewer Robin Alway considered Joust one of the few "all-time classics" in the Dreamcast collection.

=== Retrospective ===
The game received a positive retrospective reception in the decades after its release. Video game historian Steve Kent considered Joust one of the more memorable games of its time. Author David Ellis agreed, writing that the game remains enjoyable even in modern times. Brett Alan Weiss of Allgame praised the arcade game as a unique "all-time classic". He summarized his review by calling it "highly enjoyable". The gameplay design garnered acclaim, with the multiplayer aspect receiving special mention. Retro Gamer writer Mike Bevan called the game's physics "beautifully" realized and described Joust as one of the "most remarkable and well-loved titles" of the Williams library. Author John Sellers praised the competitive two-player gameplay and attributed the game's appeal to the flapping mechanism. Kevin Bowen of GameSpy's Classic Gaming wrote that Joust has an "incredibly stupid" concept but is an appealing game with good controls and competitive gameplay. He called it "one of the first really fun multiplayer games," differentiated from other contemporary multiplayer games, and a precursor to the video game deathmatch. In 2004, Ellis described Joust as an example of innovative risk absent in the then-current video game industry. In retrospect, Newcomer commended Williams Electronics' management for taking a risk on him and the game.

The home conversions have received an overall positive reception. Writing for Entertainment Weekly, Aaron Morales ranked it the ninth top game for the Atari 2600 in 2013, citing the enjoyable strategic gameplay. Weiss praised the accuracy of the conversion to the Atari 7800, citing Joust as a "perfect example" of the "relatively good arcade translations" the system was known for. While he noted the system's "awkard joystick controls", Weiss commended the gameplay design for its "finesse" and uniqueness. Reviewing the NES port, Allgame's Skyler Miller noted that the "essential gameplay is intact" but complained about the omission of the arcade version's extra features. He negatively compared the visuals to that of the Atari 7800 port, calling Atari's version superior.

Industry professionals have praised the game as well. Jeff Peters of GearWorks Games lauded the gameplay, describing it as unique and intuitive. Jeff Johannigman of Fusion Learning Systems praised the flapping mechanism, and Kim Pallister of Microsoft enjoyed the multi-player aspect. Steve Wright, Atari's former head of its special project department, included Joust on his list of games to be stranded on a desert island with, citing the new type of competitive and cooperative gameplay it introduced.

Several publications have included Joust among the top video games released. In 1995, Flux magazine staff ranked the arcade game 26th on their "Top 100 Video Games" list, commenting that despite the "bizarre as hell" concept, the game remains enjoyable over a decade later. Next Generation staff designated the arcade version as number eighty-three on its "Top 100 Games of All Time" list in 1996, saying that it had original concepts, quirky designs, and playability. In 2008, Guinness World Records listed it as the number sixty-nine arcade game in terms of technical, creative, and cultural impact. Tony Mott included the game in the book 1001 Video Games You Must Play Before You Die. The reviewer described Joust's premise as "spectacularly weird" and lamented the diminishment of such creative premises from the golden age of arcade games due to modern mainstream commercialization. Hardcore Gamer staff included the game in the website's 2015 book, "200 Best Video Games of All Time".

== Legacy ==
Williams released an arcade sequel, Joust 2: Survival of the Fittest, in 1986. The company planned to sell an arcade conversion kit, and to increase the kit's saleability, attached a sequel to one of its games to the project. While updated technology allowed Joust 2 to feature improved audio-visuals and new gameplay elements, it sold significantly fewer units than its predecessor. Soon after the original's release, players began to competitively aim for the highest score. Twin Galaxies, who officiated and tracked competitive high scores for players, recorded high scores for Joust and its sequel into the 2000s.

Since its release, developers have both copied and built upon Joust's design. Publishers released clones on several systems, including Ostron and Winged Warlords for the ZX Spectrum in 1983 as well as the 1980s shareware Glypha for the Macintosh. Ultimate Play the Game's 1983 Jetpac as well as Nintendo's 1983 Mario Bros. and 1984 Balloon Fight have elements reminiscent Joust's gameplay. The flying mechanics in the 2000 action-adventure game Messiah, which allowed the character to fly further by repeatedly pressing a button, were inspired by Joust. The 2013 arcade game Killer Queen was heavily inspired by Joust and mixes it with elements of real-time strategy and multiplayer online battle arena games. The 2014 multiplayer game Sportsball for the Wii U features characters armed with lances and mounted on large birds who fly around a 2D arena. While players must defeat opponents, the primary object is to capture balls to score goals in nets.

Joust has been parodied and referenced in popular culture, including Robot Chicken's episode "Celebutard Mountain" and the Code Monkeys episode "Just One of the Gamers". The characters make a cameo appearance in the 2015 feature film Pixels. Within video games, references include Shang Tsung's friendship finishing move in Midway Games' Mortal Kombat 3, which Jon Ryan of IGN ranked as the ninth "craziest finisher" in the series, and a Joust-like minigame in World of Warcraft: Cataclysm. Additionally, the book Ready Player One includes a scene featuring Joust.

=== Remakes and adaptations ===
A 3D remake titled Dactyl Joust was in development for the Atari Jaguar in 1995. Despite being promoted at the 1995 E3, the game was eventually canceled. Electronic Gaming Monthly staff reported that the original 2D arcade version would have been included as an easter egg. Video footage of the game running on the Jaguar console later surfaced in 2003. Midway Games made a second attempt at a 3D remake a few years later for the Nintendo 64. Tentatively referred to as Joust 3D, Joust X, and Joust 64, the game featured 3D arenas with split screen for the two-player battles. While the company was enthusiastic about the demo developer Play Mechanix had created, Midway canceled the project after a game from its San Diego studio that featured flying and fighting, Bio F.R.E.A.K.S., performed poorly in its field test. Newcomer pitched an updated version of the arcade game for the Game Boy Advance to Midway Games, which declined. The prototype uses multi-directional scrolling, more detailed graphics based on 3D renders, and new gameplay mechanics.

A Joust-themed pinball table was released in 1983, designed by Barry Oursler and Constantino Mitchell. The game includes artwork and themes from the arcade version. In addition to single player gameplay, it features competitive two-player gameplay with the players on opposing sides of the machine. Fewer than 500 machines were produced. Tiger Electronics released a keychain-sized electronic game adaption of Joust with a grayscale LCD screen in 1997. Since its release, Newcomer believed that Joust could be successfully translated into a film. However, he felt that such an adaptation was not possible with the movie technology at the time of the game's release. Midway Games later optioned Joust's movie rights to CP Productions in 2007. The newly formed production company intended to launch Joust as a new franchise, with graphic novel and video game adaptations based on the film. Marc Gottlieb was developing the script, which CP Productions founder Michael Cerenzie described as "Gladiator meets Mad Max", set 25 years in the future. Steven-Elliot Altman was attached to the graphic novel project. While production was anticipated to conclude in June 2008, this was pushed back to 2009. However, Midway filed for Chapter 11 bankruptcy in 2009. Warner Bros. Interactive Entertainment purchased most of Midway's assets, including Joust, with the intent to develop film adaptations.

== See also ==
- Justice Duel – 2017 video game with similar gameplay
