= Alienators: Evolution Continues (video game) =

2001 video game

- North American cover art
- Developer: Digital Eclipse
- Publisher: Activision
- Producer: William Baffy
- Programmers: Alex Amstel; Mark Fitt
- Artists: Simon Butler; Stoo Cambridge; Seth Forester; Peter Overstreet
- Composer: Allister Brimble
- Platform: Game Boy Advance
- Release: NA: November 13, 2001; EU: November 30, 2001
- Mode: Single-player

Alienators: Evolution Continues is an action game for the Game Boy Advance. It was developed by Digital Eclipse and published by Activision. The game was released in North America on November 13, 2001 and in Europe on November 30, 2001. The game is based on the animated science fiction television show Alienators: Evolution Continues. The player plays as Dr. Ira Kane to save the world from alien domination.

== Reception ==
Reception

Aggregate scores
Aggregator	Score
GameRankings	61.00%
Metacritic	54/100

Review scores
Publication	Score
Game Informer	7/10
IGN	7.5/10
Nintendo Power	2.5/5

The game received mostly mixed reviews. Critics enjoyed its graphics and music, but it was criticized for its password save system and generic gameplay.
