= John Newcomer =

American game designer

- Occupations: Game designer Animator
- Known for: Joust

John Newcomer is an American game designer, best known for being the designer and lead developer of the 1982 arcade video game Joust. He designed, animated, and produced multiple games for Williams Electronics, Midway Games, Cybiko, and MumboJumbo.

== Early life ==
Newcomer is the second of two children. His father, Robert, was a milkman and then a maintenance worker at University Park East movie theater. His mother, Beverly, was an administrative assistant and office manager. Newcomer attended Clay High School in South Bend, Indiana, where coincidentally one of his friends in the school chess club was Franz Lanzinger, who also ended up in the coin-op industry, working for Atari, Inc. and designing games such as Crystal Castles. Newcomer attended the University of Notre Dame, graduating in 1977 with a degree in industrial design.

His first job was at Gordon Barlow Design in Skokie, Illinois, the company known for famous games and toys such as Mouse Trap and Toy Bomb. Newcomer worked as part of a team that generated over 100 new products through the prototype stage, some of which then went on to be manufactured by companies such as Hasbro, Mego, and Ideal.

== Career in video games ==
In 1981, Newcomer moved to Williams Electronics. The company had had a recent success with the 1980 game Defender, and believing video games to be the future of entertainment, sought new creative staff. To emphasize his creative spirit, Newcomer submitted his resume stuffed down the throat of a rubber chicken, and got the job. After a few days on staff, he generated a list of game ideas that included one based on The War of the Worlds and another for Joust. His vision for War of the Worlds was not technically feasible with the hardware at the time, but Joust was possible with Williams' existing hardware, and development began.

Newcomer's initial vision was of Joust as a "flying game" with co-operative two-player gameplay. Rather than emulate the popular space theme of previous successful flying games such as Asteroids and Defender, he wanted to offer an alternative to spaceships. He made a list of things that could fly: machines, animals, and fictional characters. After evaluating the positive and negative of each idea, he chose birds, believing that they would have a wide appeal, choosing an ostrich and a stork as the main characters, with vultures as the enemies.

The decision to use birds also prompted Newcomer to deviate from the then standard eight-direction joystick. He implemented a "flapping" mechanism to allow players to control the character's ascent and descent. With the vertical direction controlled via the arcade cabinet's button, a two-way joystick was added to dictate horizontal direction.

Other games Newcomer helped design included High Impact Football and its sequel Super High Impact.

Williams Electronics eventually sold off the division which became Midway Games. Newcomer worked there as Senior Game Designer for 18 years until 1999, then moving to become Director of Game Design at Cybiko from 2000–2003, and VP of Game Design at In-Fusio from 2003–2007. He then was hired by MumboJumbo in 2007, serving first as General Manager of the Dallas Studio, and then transitioning to Director of Game Design.

== Awards ==
Joust has been listed in multiple sources as one of the more memorable games of its time, part of the Golden Age. In 2008, Guinness World Records listed it at number sixty-nine arcade game in technical, creative, and cultural impact. Kevin Bowen of GameSpy's Classic Gaming wrote that despite a concept he described as "incredibly stupid", Joust is an appealing game with good controls and competitive gameplay. Bowen further commented that the multiplayer aspect differentiated the game from others at the time. He described it as "one of the first really fun multiplayer games" and a precursor to the video game deathmatch.

Other games

- Top Hidden Object Game of 2012, Gamezebo, Angelica Weaver: Catch Me When You Can

== Games ==
- Joust, coin-op game
- Joust 2: Survival of the Fittest, coin-op
- Tri-Sports, 1989 coin-op
- Turkey Shoot, coin-op
- TouchMaster, touch-screen coin-op game
- Sinistar, coin-op
- NBA Jam, coin-op, animator (1st version)
- Revolution X, coin-op, animator
- Gilligan's Island Pinball, coin-op (Newcomer did the dot matrix, the first to have digitized images)
- Star Rider, coin-op, Newcomer was manager in charge of game design
- Angelica Weaver, PC and mobile download, hidden object adventure
- Midnight Mysteries, PC and mobile download, hidden object adventure
- 7 Wonders sequels, match-3 game for PC and mobile download
- Pickers, hidden object for PC/mobile
- Samantha Swift (four titles), PC download, hidden object games
- Luxor: Quest for the Afterlife, co-designer, ball-shooter game
- Zombie Bowl-O-Rama, bowling game, co-designer
- Narc (1988), coin-op, animator
