= Digital Eclipse =

American video game developer

Digital Eclipse Entertainment Partners Co.
- Formerly: Digital Eclipse Software, Inc. (1992–2003); Backbone Emeryville (2003–2015)
- Type: Subsidiary
- Industry: Video games
- Founded: 1992; 34 years ago
- Founders: Andrew Ayre; Hans Kim; John Neil; Howard Fukuda
- Headquarters: Emeryville, California, US
- Key people: Andrew Ayre (CEO); Mike Mika (president)
- Parent: Backbone Entertainment (2003–2015); Other Ocean Group (2015–2023); Atari SA (2023–present)
- Website: digitaleclipse.com

Digital Eclipse Entertainment Partners Co. is an American video game developer based in Emeryville, California. Founded by Andrew Ayre in 1992, the company found success developing commercial emulations of arcade games for Game Boy Color. In 2003, the company merged with ImaginEngine and created Backbone Entertainment. A group of Digital Eclipse employees split off from Backbone to form Other Ocean Interactive, which, in 2015, bought and revived the Digital Eclipse brand. The newer incarnation found success developing video game compilations of retro games. Atari SA purchased the company in 2023.

== History ==
Digital Eclipse was founded in 1992 by Andrew Ayre, Hans Kim, John Neil, and Howard Fukuda. The company's first offices were opened on a "nondescript, factory-filled" street in Emeryville, California, where Ayre (a native of St. John's, Newfoundland and Labrador) had moved following his graduation from Harvard University to live with his girlfriend. Initially a technology startup company, Digital Eclipse soon found that its software would be useful in the video game industry, and turned to game development instead. Using their technology, the company opted to produce commercial emulations of arcade games, such as Williams Electronics' Joust, Defender, and Robotron: 2084. For these games, Digital Eclipse developed an interpreter that emulated the games' arcade machines' chipset, including the Motorola 6809 central processing unit. This approach was meant to have the emulations act true to the original versions of these games, and not carry any imperfections direct ports could have introduced. All three emulated games were released as part of The Digital Arcade series for Mac OS in 1995.

Digital Eclipse found further success when the Game Boy Color was released; the new handheld console included a central processing unit based on the architecture of the Zilog Z80, the processor used in a number of older arcade machines. While other developers were moving on to develop for the more powerful PlayStation home console, Digital Eclipse developed about 60 games for their niche market on the Game Boy Color. These games included Klax, Spy Hunter, Moon Patrol, Paperboy, Joust, Defender, and 720°, as well as an original game, Tarzan, which Digital Eclipse produced for Activision. Digital Eclipse also opened a second studio in Vancouver, Canada. In February 2001, the company announced its move into the games market for "wireless Web" devices, hiring Scott Nisbet as director of wireless gaming, as well as Bruce Binder as Nisbet's consultant.

In 2003, Digital Eclipse merged with ImaginEngine, creating Backbone Entertainment; while ImaginEngine remained an independent studio within that structure, Digital Eclipse's studios became Backbone Emeryville and Backbone Vancouver, respectively. By this point, Digital Eclipse had produced 70 games on 11 different platforms. In February 2006, Backbone opened another subsidiary studio, Backbone Charlottetown, in Charlottetown, Prince Edward Island, Canada, under the lead of Ayre. In May 2007, the new studio, including Ayre and several former Digital Eclipse employees, spun off from Backbone and became Other Ocean Interactive, aiming at showcasing Digital Eclipse's former traits in a smaller fashion.

Backbone Vancouver was mostly dismantled in September 2008 and closed entirely in May 2009, while Backbone laid off the majority of its Emeryville-based staff in October 2012. On June 8, 2015, after acquiring the Digital Eclipse name, Other Ocean's parent company, Other Ocean Group, announced that it had reformed Digital Eclipse as part of its Other Ocean Emeryville studio. Co-founders include Ayre, Mike Mika—who had acted as technical director for the original Digital Eclipse—and former Gamasutra writer Frank Cifaldi. The new Digital Eclipse laid its focus on video game preservation, and Cifaldi became the studio's "head of restoration", a title which Cifaldi noted was an industry first. At the time, Cifaldi also stated that Digital Eclipse aimed at becoming the video game equivalent of The Criterion Collection. Cifaldi would leave Digital Eclipse around 2020 to work on the Video Game History Foundation full time.

Atari SA announced it would acquire Digital Eclipse in October 2023 for $4 million in cash and newly issued ordinary shares worth $2.5 million, alongside a possible earn-out of up to $13.5 million. Atari closed the deal by November 6, 2023.

== Eclipse Engine ==
Part of Digital Eclipse's work include its own Eclipse Engine, a tool that allows it to decompile the code from older games into a machine-readable format that is then used by the Eclipse Engine to play them on modern systems. While it may take some extra work by the company to decompile the older game into the proper format one time, this approach allows it to rapidly port the Eclipse Engine version to any modern gaming system, including personal computers, consoles, and portable and mobile devices, with minimal effort. This engine has been used in Digital Eclipse's Mega Man Legacy Collection and The Disney Afternoon Collection. The Eclipse Engine was primarily developed by Digital Eclipse's studio head, Mike Mika, and Other Ocean engineer Kevin Wilson, branched off from Other Ocean's Bakesale engine.

== Games developed ==
=== As Digital Eclipse (1992–2004) ===
Year	Title	Platform(s)
1994	Joust	Mac OS
1994	Robotron: 2084	Mac OS
1994	Defender	Mac OS
1995	Activision's Commodore 64 15 Pack	Microsoft Windows
1996	Williams Arcade Classics	Dreamcast, Game.com, Microsoft Windows, MS-DOS, PlayStation, Sega Genesis, Sega Saturn, Super Nintendo Entertainment System
1996	Ms. Pac-Man	Super Nintendo Entertainment System
1996	Arcade's Greatest Hits: The Atari Collection 1	PlayStation, Sega Saturn, Super Nintendo Entertainment System
1997	Arcade's Greatest Hits: The Midway Collection 2	Microsoft Windows, PlayStation
1998	NFL Blitz	Game Boy Color
1998	Arcade's Greatest Hits: The Atari Collection 2	PlayStation
1998	Rampage World Tour	Game Boy Color
1999	Knockout Kings	Game Boy Color
1999	Disney's Tarzan	Game Boy Color
1999	720°	Game Boy Color
1999	Atari Arcade Hits 1	Microsoft Windows
1999	Arcade's Greatest Hits: The Atari Collection 2	Microsoft Windows
1999	Arcade Classic No. 4: Defender / Joust	Game Boy Color
1999	Klax	Game Boy Color
1999	Arcade Hits: Moon Patrol / Spy Hunter	Game Boy Color
1999	Rampart	Game Boy Color
1999	Rampage 2: Universal Tour	Game Boy Color
1999	Arcade Party Pak	PlayStation
1999	Mortal Kombat 4	Game Boy Color
1999	Marble Madness	Game Boy Color
1999	Ghosts 'n Goblins	Game Boy Color
2000	Atari Arcade Hits 2	Microsoft Windows
2000	Little Nicky	Game Boy Color
2000	Alice in Wonderland	Game Boy Color
2001	Dragon's Lair	Game Boy Color
2001	Batman: Chaos in Gotham	Game Boy Color
2001	X-Men: Wolverine's Rage	Game Boy Color
2001	Atari Anniversary Edition	Windows
2001	Atari Anniversary Edition	Dreamcast
2001	Atari Anniversary Edition Redux	PlayStation
2001	Rayman Advance	Game Boy Advance
2001	Spyro: Season of Ice	Game Boy Advance
2001	Alienators: Evolution Continues	Game Boy Advance
2002	Spider-Man	Game Boy Advance
2002	Disney's Lilo & Stitch	Game Boy Advance
2002	Monster Force	Game Boy Advance
2002	Spyro 2: Season of Flame	Game Boy Advance
2002	Disney's Kim Possible: Revenge of Monkey Fist	Game Boy Advance
2002	Phantasy Star Collection	Game Boy Advance
2002	XXX	Game Boy Advance
2003	Lizzie McGuire: On the Go!	Game Boy Advance
2003	Spy Kids 3-D: Game Over	Game Boy Advance
2003	Spyro: Attack of the Rhynocs	Game Boy Advance
2003	Mucha Lucha! Mascaritas of the Lost Code	Game Boy Advance
2004	Spider-Man 2	Game Boy Advance
2004	Grand Theft Auto Advance	Game Boy Advance
2004	Mortal Kombat	Plug-and-play

=== As Digital Eclipse (2015–present) ===
Year	Title	Publisher(s)	Platform(s)
2015	Mega Man Legacy Collection	Capcom	Microsoft Windows, Nintendo 3DS, Nintendo Switch, PlayStation 4, Xbox One, Amazon Luna
2017	The Disney Afternoon Collection	Capcom	Microsoft Windows, PlayStation 4, Xbox One
2018	Street Fighter 30th Anniversary Collection	Capcom	Microsoft Windows, Nintendo Switch, PlayStation 4, Xbox One
2018	SNK 40th Anniversary Collection	SNK	Microsoft Windows, Nintendo Switch, PlayStation 4, Xbox One
2019	Disney Classic Games: Aladdin and The Lion King	Disney Electronic Content; Nighthawk Interactive	Microsoft Windows, Nintendo Switch, PlayStation 4, Xbox One
2020	Samurai Shodown NeoGeo Collection	SNK	Microsoft Windows, Nintendo Switch, PlayStation 4, Xbox One
2021	Blizzard Arcade Collection (Note: Co-developed with Blizzard Entertainment)	Blizzard Entertainment	Microsoft Windows, Nintendo Switch, PlayStation 4, Xbox One
2021	Space Jam: A New Legacy - The Game		Xbox One, Xbox Series X/S
2021	Disney Classic Games Collection	Disney Electronic Content; Nighthawk Interactive	Microsoft Windows, Nintendo Switch, PlayStation 4, Xbox One
2022	Teenage Mutant Ninja Turtles: The Cowabunga Collection	Konami	Microsoft Windows, Nintendo Switch, PlayStation 4, PlayStation 5, Xbox One, Xbox Series X/S
2022	Candy Creeps		Microsoft Windows
2022	Garbage Pail Kids: Mad Mike and the Quest for Stale Gum (Note: Co-developed with Retrotainment Games and published by iam8bit.)	iam8bit	Microsoft Windows, Nintendo Switch, PlayStation 4, Xbox One, Xbox Series X/S
2022	Digital Eclipse Arcade: Invasion of the Buffet Snatchers		Microsoft Windows
2022	Atari 50: The Anniversary Celebration	Atari	Microsoft Windows, Nintendo Switch, PlayStation 4, PlayStation 5, Xbox One, Xbox Series X/S, Atari VCS
2022	Digital Eclipse Arcade: Jollyball		Microsoft Windows
2023	Digital Eclipse Arcade: Q.P.I.D		Microsoft Windows
2023	The Making of Karateka		Microsoft Windows, Nintendo Switch, PlayStation 4, PlayStation 5, Xbox One, Xbox Series X/S
2023	Wizardry: Proving Grounds of the Mad Overlord (remake)		Microsoft Windows, Nintendo Switch, PlayStation 4, PlayStation 5, Xbox One, Xbox Series X/S
2024	Llamasoft: The Jeff Minter Story		Microsoft Windows, Nintendo Switch, PlayStation 4, PlayStation 5, Xbox One, Xbox Series X/S
2024	Volgarr the Viking II		Microsoft Windows, Nintendo Switch, PlayStation 4, PlayStation 5, Xbox One, Xbox Series X/S
2024	Worms Armageddon Anniversary Edition	Team17	Nintendo Switch, PlayStation 4, PlayStation 5, Xbox One, Xbox Series X/S
2024	Tetris Forever		Microsoft Windows, Nintendo Switch, PlayStation 4, PlayStation 5, Xbox One, Xbox Series X/S
2024	Mighty Morphin Power Rangers: Rita's Rewind		Microsoft Windows, Nintendo Switch, PlayStation 4, PlayStation 5, Xbox One, Xbox Series X/S
2025	Yu-Gi-Oh! Early Days Collection	Konami	Microsoft Windows, Nintendo Switch
2025	Golden Tee Arcade Classics	Atari	Microsoft Windows, Nintendo Switch, PlayStation 4, PlayStation 5, Xbox One
2025	Mortal Kombat: Legacy Kollection	Atari	Microsoft Windows, Nintendo Switch, Nintendo Switch 2, PlayStation 4, PlayStation 5, Xbox One, Xbox Series X/S
2026	The Disney Afternoon Collection	Atari	Nintendo Switch, Nintendo Switch 2
2026	Rayman 30th Anniversary Edition	Ubisoft; Atari	Microsoft Windows, Nintendo Switch, PlayStation 5, Xbox Series X/S
2026	Toy Story: Retro Roundup!	Atari	Microsoft Windows, Nintendo Switch, Nintendo Switch 2, PlayStation 4, PlayStation 5, Xbox One, Xbox Series X/S
2026	Toy Story 3: Complete Edition	Atari	Microsoft Windows, Nintendo Switch, Nintendo Switch 2, PlayStation 4, PlayStation 5, Xbox One, Xbox Series X/S
2026	Barbie Rewind	Atari	Microsoft Windows, Nintendo Switch, Nintendo Switch 2, PlayStation 4, PlayStation 5, Xbox One, Xbox Series X/S
