= Joust 2: Survival of the Fittest =

1986 video game

- Arcade flier with the game's logo and a predatory bird
- Developer: Williams Electronics
- Publisher: Williams Electronics
- Designer: John Newcomer
- Programmers: Joe Hellensen; Kristina Donofrio; Warren Davis
- Artists: John Newcomer; Jack Haeger; Tim Elliott (cabinet)
- Composer: Chris Granner
- Platform: Arcade
- Release: December 1986
- Genre: Action
- Modes: Single-player, multiplayer
- Arcade system: Williams Rev. 2; CPU: M6809 (@ 1 MHz); Sound CPU: M6808 (@ 1 MHz), M6809 (@ 2 MHz); Sound Chips: Yamaha YM2151 FM, MC1408 DAC, Harris HC55536 CVSD

Joust 2: Survival of the Fittest is an arcade video game developed by Williams Electronics and released in 1986. It is a sequel to Williams' 1982 game Joust. Like its predecessor, Joust 2 is an action game set in a fantasy world of aerial combat. The player controls a knight on a flying ostrich and completes levels by defeating enemy knights riding buzzards; the higher combatant in a collision wins. Joust 2 has improved visuals and audio and more complex gameplay, including eggs which turn into mutant buzzards after falling in lava, the ability to transform into a flying horse, additional enemy types, and a button which has a random effect when run over. Unlike Joust which has a single screen layout that evolves over time, the levels in Joust 2 are distinct and have unique and themes and gameplay elements.

The game uses more advanced hardware than the original Joust, allowing for the new elements. John Newcomer led development again, which Williams initiated in order to sell a conversion kit that allowed arcade owners to convert an existing cabinet into another game. While Joust used a horizontal monitor, the company chose a vertically oriented screen for the kit as a result of the design's popularity at the time.

Released after the golden age of arcade games, Joust 2 did not achieve the critical or commercial success of Joust. The game was not ported to contemporary home systems but was released as part of arcade game compilations starting in 1997.

== Gameplay ==
The player controls the new yellow Pegasus creature (top left) attempting to defeat the grey enemy knights scattered around the stage. The score and player lives are tracked in the banner with M.C. Escher-like designs at the bottom of the screen.

Like its predecessor, Joust 2 is a 2D combat game taking place in the air and on landing platforms. The player controls the protagonist, a yellow knight riding a flying ostrich, and navigates the game world with a two-way joystick and a button. The joystick controls the horizontal direction that the knight travels, while pressing the button makes the ostrich flap its wings. The rate at which the player repeatedly presses the button causes the ostrich to fly upward, hover, or slowly descend. The objective is to defeat groups of enemy knights riding buzzards that populate each level, referred to as a wave. Upon completing a wave, the player progresses to a more challenging one.

To defeat enemies, the players must navigate the knight to collide with them. The elevation of an enemy in relation to the player's knight determines the outcome of the collision. If the protagonist's jousting lance is higher than that of the enemy, the villain is defeated and vice versa. A collision of equal elevations results in the two characters bouncing off each other. A second player can join the game; the two players can either cooperatively complete the waves or attack each other while competitively defeating enemies. Joust 2 introduces several gameplay elements, such as a transformation ability that morphs the player's bird into a pegasus, which provides better offensive capabilities while on ground but poor flight capabilities. Other new elements include a large Shadow Lord that flies on scorpion-tail buzzards, Crystal Bats that hatch from crystals embedded in ledges, a Gold Egg that opens a quickly changing random event box when collected, and buy-in to continue preserves the current score. Certain game events also have voice synthesis.

== Development and release ==
Joust 2 was developed by Williams Electronics, with John Newcomer as the lead designer. The game features amplified monaural sound and raster graphics on a 19-inch color CRT monitor. Like other Williams arcade games, Joust 2 was programmed in assembly language. Williams' video game department had shrunk following a decline in the video game industry. The company wanted to sell an arcade conversion kit for games that use a vertically oriented monitor, which had become popular at the time. Management felt that a sequel would improve the kit's saleability. The company decided to release a sequel to either Robotron: 2084 or Joust, ultimately choosing the latter. Technology had progressed since the original's release, providing more flexibility than before. As a result, Newcomer conceived new elements: additional characters, improved audio-visuals, and new mechanics. To portray a progression of villains, the staff added a new enemy, Knight Lord. The developers added backgrounds to the levels, inspired by artwork by M. C. Escher, Newcomer's favorite artist. Staff added a transform button to provide players with more variety and balance the gameplay.

While Joust was widely ported to home systems, Joust 2 was only made available as part of emulated collections. In 1997, it was released as part of Arcade's Greatest Hits: The Midway Collection 2. The game was also included in the 2003 and 2012 multi-platform compilations Midway Arcade Treasures and Midway Arcade Origins, respectively. Both Joust games along with many other Midway arcade games appear in the 2016 Midway Arcade Level Pack expansion of Lego Dimensions. The developer, Traveller's Tales, considered recreating them in Lego form but decided to present them in their original forms to maintain what they felt made the games good. Lego versions of Joust characters appear outside of the emulated games.

== Reception ==
Williams shipped around 1,000 units of Joust 2, significantly fewer than its predecessor. Brett Alan Weiss of Allgame and Mike Bevan of Retro Gamer attributed the poor numbers to an industry slump in the mid-1980s. Joust 2 arcade cabinets have since become fairly rare among collectors. Weiss negatively compared the game to its predecessor, calling Joust more popular and enjoyable, but commented that Joust 2's graphics are more detailed and robust. In retrospect, Newcomer expressed dissatisfaction with the game's design, specifically the monitor's orientation. He commented that the gameplay works best with a horizontal orientation or with multi-directional scrolling. The vertical orientation proved to be a hindrance for home conversion.

IGN staff considered its inclusion in Arcade's Greatest Hits: The Midway Collection 2 part of the compilation's "real value" due to Joust 2's rarity. Similarly reviewers for Next Generation magazine noted that "true fans" will be thrilled at its inclusion. GamePro's Dan Elektro echoed similar comments as IGN and further called Joust 2 a substantial improvement over the original. Conversely, Craig Harris considered Joust 2 a "slightly less imaginative sequel" compared to Joust in his review of Midway Arcade Treasures.
