= Sinistar =

1983 video game

- Promotional flyer showing the game's upright and cockpit cabinets
- Developer: Williams Electronics
- Publisher: Williams Electronics
- Designers: Noah Falstein; John Newcomer
- Programmers: Sam Dicker; RJ Mical; Richard Witt; Ken Graham
- Artist: Jack Haeger
- Platform: Arcade
- Release: February 1983
- Genre: Multidirectional shooter
- Modes: Single-player, multiplayer

Sinistar is a 1983 (Note: The game was released in 1983. The in-game copyright notice incorrectly reads 1982.) multidirectional shooter arcade video game developed and manufactured by Williams Electronics. It was created by Sam Dicker, Jack Haeger, Noah Falstein, RJ Mical, Python Anghelo, and Richard Witt. Players control a space pilot who battles the eponymous Sinistar, a giant, anthropomorphic spacecraft. The game is known for its use of digitized speech and high difficulty level.

Although not ported standalone to home consoles, Sinistar was included in multiple arcade compilations. A sequel from a different developer and publisher, Sinistar: Unleashed was released for Microsoft Windows in 1999.

== Gameplay ==
The player's ship, left of center, below a Warrior and partially obscured by a just-released Sinibomb

The player pilots a lone spacecraft, flying through a large region of space, part of which is shown on the mini-map at the top of the screen. Shooting drifting planetoids releases small, white crystals. When collected, each crystal turns into a "Sinibomb", which is the weapon for defeating the end of level boss, Sinistar, an animated spacecraft with a demonic skull face. A planetoid contains a limited number of crystals; shooting it too rapidly causes it to explode.

Sinistar does not exist at the start of a level, but is constructed by red enemy worker ships. Workers cannot hurt the player, but they compete to collect crystals to build the Sinistar. Warrior ships directly attack the player's ship, shoot planetoids to mine crystals, and guard the Sinistar while it is being built. It takes 20 crystals to create the 20 pieces of a completely built Sinistar, but only 13 Sinibombs to destroy it. The 7 pieces making up the face are considered a single piece once Sinistar is active.

When the Sinistar is complete, its digitized voice announces "Beware, I live" and Sinistar chases the player's ship while making threatening remarks: "Run! Run! Run!", "Beware, coward!", "I hunger!", "Run, coward!", and a loud roar. It has no weapons, but it destroys the player's ship on contact, after which it sometimes proclaims "I am Sinistar". A dedicated button releases a Sinibomb which automatically targets the Sinistar. A Sinibomb can be intercepted mid-flight by Workers, Warriors, and planetoids. Successfully damaging the Sinistar causes angry roaring.

The player warps to a new zone each time Sinistar is defeated. The unnamed first zone is followed by the Worker Zone, Warrior Zone, Planetoid Zone, and Void Zone, then it cycles back to the Worker Zone. Each zone emphasizes a particular game feature, with the Void Zone having fewer planetoids. In all but the first zone, a completed but damaged Sinistar can be repaired by enemy Workers, extending its lifespan if the player is unable to kill it quickly.

== Development ==
Sinistar uses a 49-way optical joystick that Williams produced specifically for this game.

Sinistar's dialogue was voiced by radio personality John Doremus while its roar was created from a previously existing stock recording of a gorilla. The audio played through an HC-55516 CVSD decoder.

Sinistar contains a bug that grants the player many lives (ships). It happens only if the player is down to one life and the Sinistar is about to eat the player's ship. If a warrior ship shoots and destroys the ship at this moment, it immediately takes the player to zero lives, and the Sinistar eating the player subtracts another life. Since the number of lives is stored in the game as an 8-bit unsigned integer, the subtraction from zero will cause the integer to wrap around to the largest value representable with 8 bits, which is 255 in decimal.

The 6809 source code for Sinistar is available at https://github.com/historicalsource/sinistar.

== Reception ==
In 1995, Flux magazine ranked Sinistar 72nd on their Top 100 Video Games. They praised the game calling it a "truly harrowing" arcade classic.

== Legacy ==
There were no contemporary ports of Sinistar. Versions for Atari 2600 and the Atari 8-bit computers were in progress, but not completed. Sinistar was commercially available in the mid-1990s as part of Williams Arcade's Greatest Hits for the Super NES, Sega Genesis Saturn, Dreamcast, PlayStation, and Microsoft Windows. It is also available as part of Midway Arcade Treasures for the Xbox, GameCube, and PlayStation 2 in 2003, and for Windows in 2004; part of Midway Arcade Treasures: Extended Play for the PlayStation Portable in late 2005; and part of Midway Arcade Origins for the PlayStation 3 and Xbox 360. Sinistar is included in Midway's Greatest Arcade Hits on the Game Boy Advance.

A 3D sequel from a different developer and publisher was released for Windows in 1999 as Sinistar: Unleashed. The project was originally not connected with Sinistar, but the license was acquired during development.

=== Clones ===
Deathstar is a Sinistar clone for the BBC Micro and Acorn Electron, published by Superior Software in 1984. It was originally developed as an official port to be released by Atarisoft, but they decided to abandon the BBC platform while a number of games were still in development. Sinistaar (1989) is a clone for the Tandy Color Computer 3. Xenostar (1994) is a public domain clone for the Amiga. Sinistar.GS (2026) is a clone for the Apple IIGS.

=== In popular culture ===
Sinistar is referenced in various non-video-game media. The Cage song "Grand Ol' Party Crash" samples Sinistar. The film We Are the Strange uses "Beware, I live", "I hunger", "Run, coward", and Sinistar's roar. Sinistar makes several appearances in the webcomic Bob the Angry Flower, and also appears as the title of one of the print editions of the comic. Sinistar appears in the DVD version of the South Park episode trilogy "Imaginationland". The sound bite "Beware, coward" was used in the theme tune to the British Channel 4 video-game TV show Bits. The audio version of podcast IGN Game Scoop uses the sound bite "Beware, I live" in its theme tune. The game was featured prominently in the music video for the Sheena Easton song "Almost Over You". Sinistar himself is name-dropped and various lines of his are quoted in Stage 42 of Neon Genesis Evangelion: Shinji Ikari Raising Project.

Sinistar receives a large reference in chapters 30 and 31 of the book Ghost Story, a 2011 novel in the Dresden Files series by Jim Butcher, during a recollection of a demonic battle from the protagonist's youth.

Vocal samples of Sinistar are used in Buckethead's song "Revenge of The Double-Man" that appears in the 1999 album Monsters and Robots.
