= Robotron: 2084 =

1982 video game

- Arcade flyer showing the upright cabinet
- Developer: Vid Kidz: Lynx Shadowsoft
- Publisher: Williams Electronics: Ports Atarisoft Atari, Inc. Atari Corporation
- Designers: Eugene Jarvis; Larry DeMar
- Programmers: Eugene Jarvis; Larry DeMar: Atari 8-bit Judy Bogart; 7800 David Brown; Apple II Steven Hays; C64 Tom Griner; Lynx Dave Dies
- Platform: Arcade: Atari 8-bit, VIC-20, Atari 5200, Commodore 64, Apple II, IBM PC, BBC Micro, Atari 7800, Atari ST, Atari Lynx
- Release: March 1982: Arcade; NA: March 1982 Atari 8-bit; January 1984 VIC-20; February 1984 5200, C64; March 1984 Apple II, IBM PC; 1984 BBC Micro; EU: 1985 7800; May 15, 1986 Atari ST; 1987 Lynx; NA: 1991
- Genre: Twin-stick shooter
- Modes: Single-player, multiplayer

Robotron: 2084 (also referred to simply as Robotron) is a twin-stick shooter video game developed by Eugene Jarvis and Larry DeMar of Vid Kidz and released by Williams Electronics for arcades in 1982. The game is set in the year 2084 in a dystopian future where robots have turned against humans in a cybernetic revolt. The player's goals are to defeat endless waves of robots, rescue surviving humans, and earn as many points as possible.

Jarvis and DeMar drew inspiration from Nineteen Eighty-Four, Berzerk and Space Invaders when designing Robotron: 2084. The pair designed the game to instill panic in players by presenting them with conflicting goals and having many on-screen projectiles coming from multiple directions. A two-joystick control scheme was implemented to provide the player with more precise controls, and enemies with different behaviors were added to make the game challenging. Following its release in arcades, Atari ported the game to several home platforms in the 1980s. It was later included in many retro gaming collections.

Robotron was critically and commercially successful. Praise among critics focused on the game's intense action, control scheme, and colorful visuals. While its challenging gameplay proved popular, commentators acknowledged it catered to select players. Though not the first game with twin joystick controls, Robotron: 2084 is cited as the game that popularized it in the 1980s; the design later saw a resurgence in the 2000s. Jarvis used the same control scheme later in the 1990 Smash TV. Robotron was ported to numerous home systems, most of which lacked the arcade's control hardware. It is frequently listed as one of Jarvis's best contributions to the video game industry.

== Gameplay ==
The player controls the protagonist (center) with two joysticks to shoot the robots while dodging their attacks and attempting to rescue the human (top right). Game statistics (score and player lives) are tracked in the top left corner.

Robotron is a twin-stick shooter game in which the player controls the on-screen protagonist from a top-down perspective. The game uses a two-joystick control scheme; the left joystick controls the on-screen character's movement, while the right is used to fire the character's weapon in specific directions. Both joysticks allow for an input direction in one of eight ways. The game is set in the year 2084 in a fictional world where "Robotrons" have, after a robot uprising, eradicated most of the human race. The main protagonist is a super-powered genetically engineered mutant who attempts to save the last human family.

Each level, referred to as a "wave", is a single screen populated with a large number of various enemy robots and obstacles; types range from invincible giants to robots that manufacture other robots. Coming into contact with an enemy, projectile, or obstacle costs the player one life; more lives can be earned at certain point totals. Waves also include human family members, who can be rescued to score additional points, but certain robots can either kill them or transform them into enemies. Destroying all vulnerable robots allows the player to progress to the next wave; the cycle continues until all lives are lost.

== Development ==
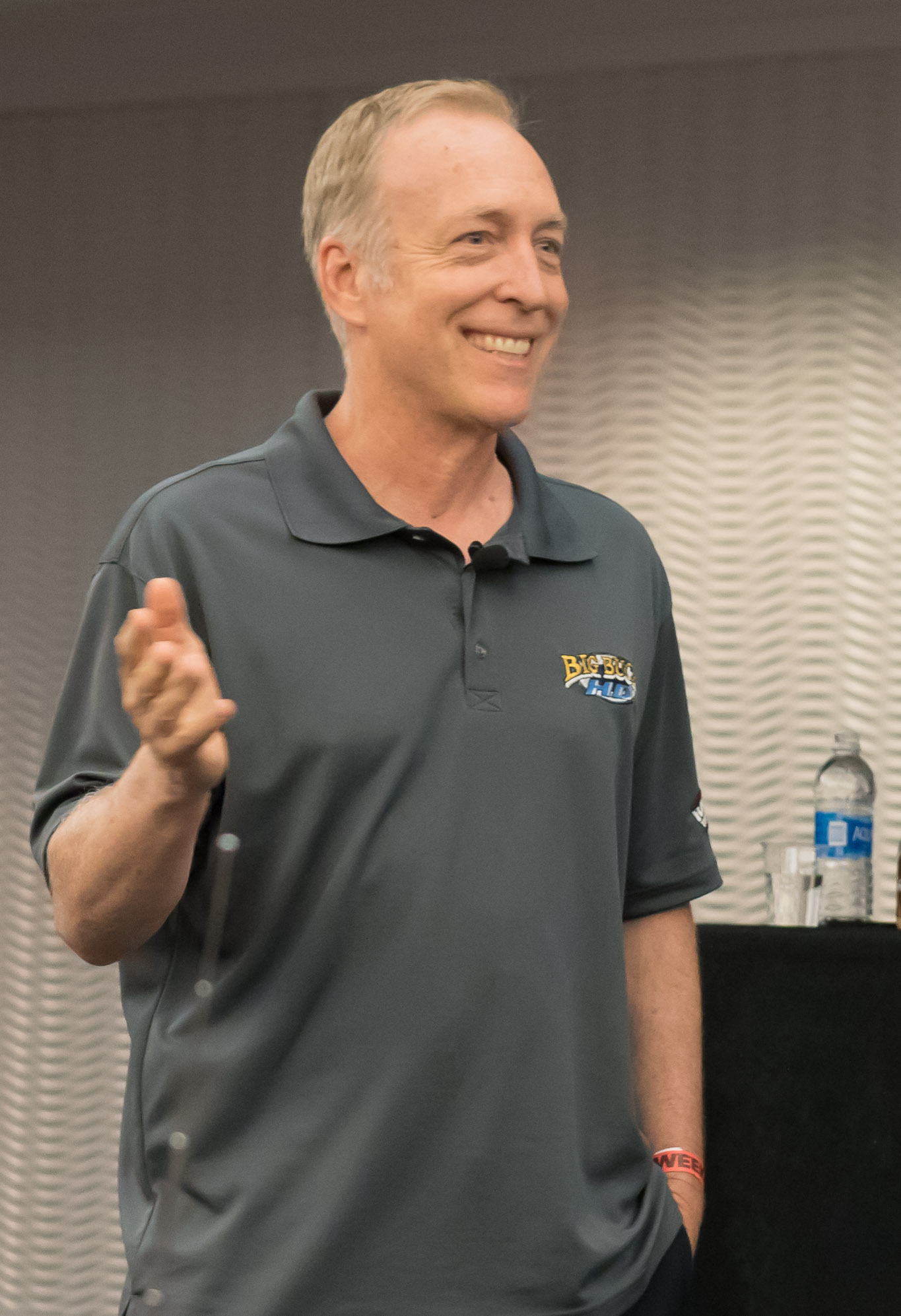
Eugene Jarvis

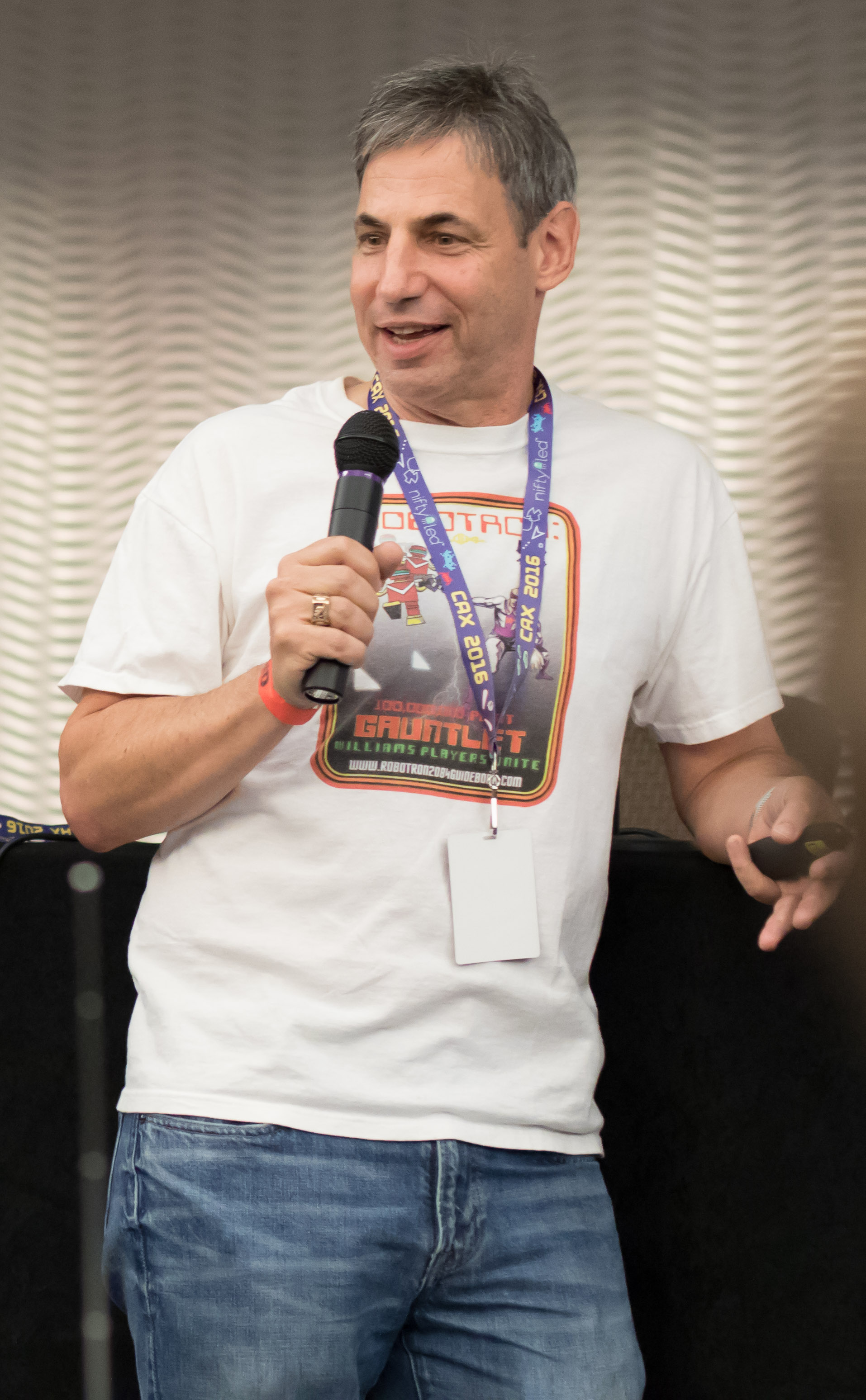
Larry DeMar

The founders of VidKidz, Eugene Jarvis and Larry DeMar (both shown in 2016), created the game for Williams Electronics, where they both had been employed at previously.

Robotron: 2084 was developed in six months by Eugene Jarvis and Larry DeMar, founders of Vid Kidz. Vid Kidz served as a consulting firm that designed games for Williams Electronics, whom Jarvis and DeMar had previously worked for. Under the working title Robot Wars, the pair used a Gimix 6809 computer to write the game's program in assembly language. Jarvis and DeMar playtested the game themselves and continually tweaked the designs as the project progressed. The game was designed to provide excitement for players; Jarvis described the game as an "athletic experience" derived from a "physical element" in the two-joystick design.

After spending 18 months working collectively on Defender and Stargate, the developers desired a new creative focus and chose robots. The game was first inspired by Stern Electronics' 1980 arcade game Berzerk and the Commodore PET computer game Chase. Berzerk is a shooting game in which a character traverses a maze to shoot robots, and Chase is a text-based game in which players lure text characters into obstacles. The initial concept involved a passive main character; the object was to force robots chasing the protagonist to collide with stationary, lethal obstacles. As they deemed the design too boring compared to other action titles on the market, the developers added shooting gameplay to provide more excitement. The shooting elements drew inspiration from the 1978 arcade game Space Invaders, which had previously inspired Defender, their first arcade game.

Though contemporary games began to use scrolling to facilitate larger levels, the pair chose a single screen to confine the action. Jarvis aimed to outdo the tension in Space Invaders as the aliens crowd the player. To instill panic in the player, the protagonist is initially placed in the center of the game's action and must deal with projectiles coming from multiple directions, as opposed to previous shooting games, such as Space Invaders and Galaxian, where enemies attack from a single direction. This made for more challenging gameplay, an aspect Jarvis took pride in.

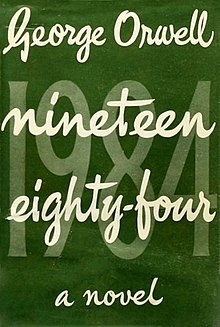
The developers derived the game's Orwellian world from George Orwell's seminal dystopian story Nineteen Eighty-Four (pictured).

The developers felt a rescue theme similar to Defender was needed to complete the game and added a human family as a method to motivate the player to earn a high score. The additional aspect forced the player to constantly reevaluate their situation to choose the optimal action: avoid enemy attacks to survive, defeat enemies to progress, and save the family to earn points. Inspired by George Orwell's Nineteen Eighty-Four, Jarvis and DeMar incorporated an Orwellian world into the plot. Since the year 1984 was approaching, they decided to set the game a century into the future to provide a more realistic time frame for their version of "Big Brother". Jarvis, a science fiction fan, based the Robotrons on the idea that computers would become advanced entities that helped humans in everyday life. He believed the robots would eventually realize that humans are the cause of the world's problems and revolt against them.

The pair placed enemies in different groups throughout the stages to create themes. Early stages are designed to be relatively simple compared to later ones. The difficulty level is designed to increase quickly so players would struggle to complete later stages. In retrospect, Jarvis attributed his and DeMar's average player skills to the game's balanced design. Though they made the game as difficult as they could, the high end of their skills proved to be a good challenge for expert players. The graphics have a simple appearance to avoid a cluttered game screen, and object designs were made distinct from each other to avoid confusion. They chose black as the background color to help characters stand out visually and further reduce clutter.

=== Enemy designs ===
Virtually no behavior in Robotron is deterministic. There's always a random factor added to any behavior for more interest. We see the game as being pissed off or angry when there has just been a bad lot of random numbers drawn. Or we think we are "on a roll", when merely we have gotten a lot of lucky random draws.

— Eugene Jarvis on players' reactions to the game's artificial intelligence

Jarvis and DeMar used graph paper and colored pencils to create the initial character designs. The enemy types were designed to exhibit unique behavior toward the player character; random elements were programmed into the enemies' actions to make the game more interesting. The developers spent several weeks play testing to adjust the enemies' behaviors.

The first two designed—Electrodes and Grunts—are the simplest. Electrodes are stationary objects that are lethal to the in-game characters. Based on enemies in Chase, Grunts are simple robots that chase the protagonist by plotting the shortest path to him; they are designed to overwhelm the player with large groups. While testing the game with the new control system and the two enemies, Jarvis and DeMar were impressed by the gameplay's excitement and fun. As a result, they began steadily increasing the number of on-screen enemies to over a hundred to see if more enemies would generate more enjoyment.

More enemies were created to add variety. Large indestructible Hulks, inspired by an enemy in Berzerk and Marvel Comics' Hulk, were added to kill the humans on the stage. Though they cannot be destroyed, the developers decided to have the protagonist's projectiles slow the Hulk's movement as a way to balance the gameplay. Levitating Enforcers were added to provide enemies that could shoot back at the main character; Jarvis and DeMar liked the idea of a floating robot and felt it would be easier to animate. A projectile algorithm was devised for Enforcers to simulate enemy artificial intelligence. The developers felt shooting directly at the protagonist would be ineffective because the character's constant motion would always result in a miss. Random elements were added to make the projectile more unpredictable; the Enforcer aims at a random location in a ten-pixel radius around the character and random acceleration curves the trajectory.

Jarvis devised the Spheroid enemy as a way to further differentiate Enforcers; Spheroids continually generated them, rather than have Enforcers already on the screen like other enemies. Brains were conceived as robots that could capture humans to brainwash them into enemies called Progs. They could also launch cruise missiles that chase the player in a random zigzag pattern, making them difficult to shoot down. DeMar devised the final enemies as a way to further increase the game's difficulty; Tanks fire projectiles that bounce around the screen, and Quarks are Tank-producing robots.

=== Hardware ===
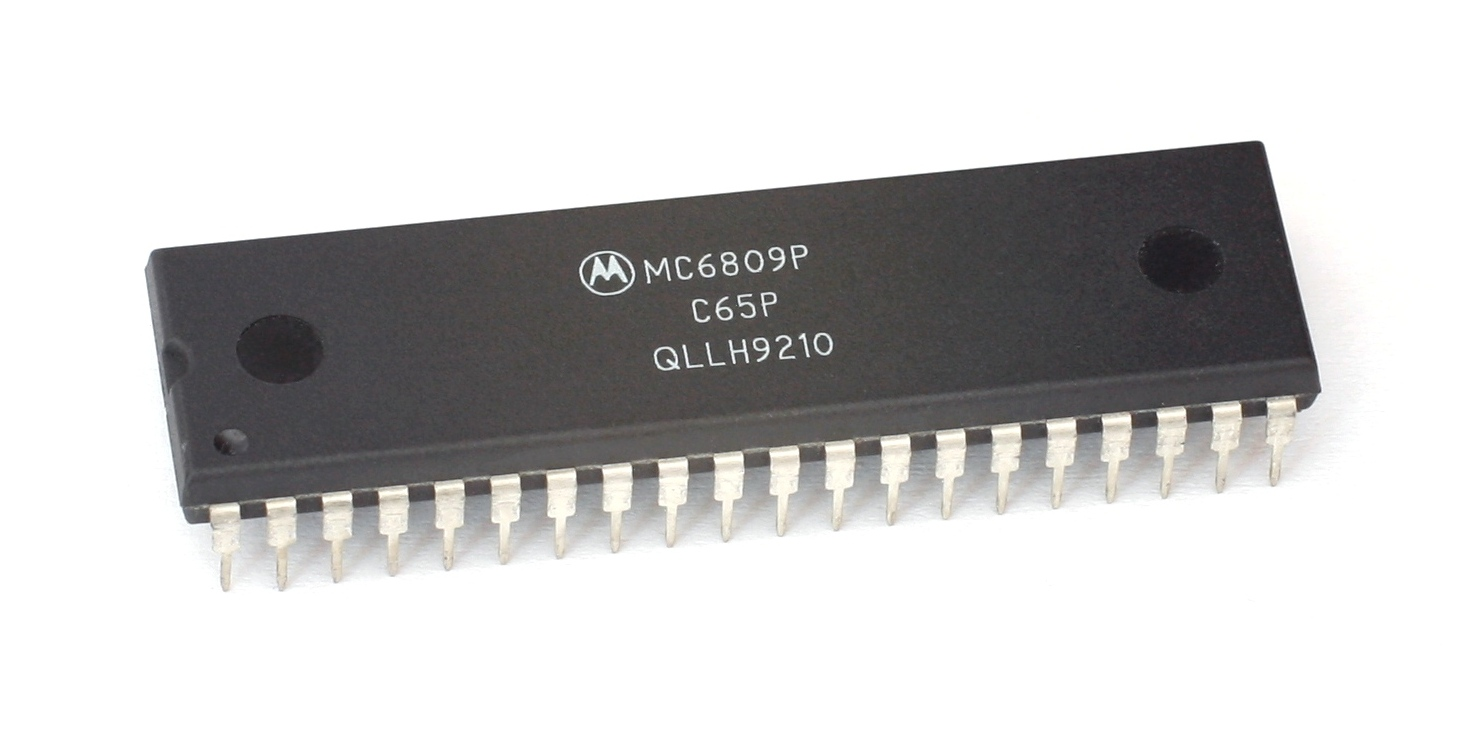
Robotron: 2084 followed Williams Electronics' design trend in the early 1980s of using the Motorola 6809 microprocessor (pictured) as the arcade machine's main CPU.

Robotron: 2084 arcade machines are based on the hardware designs established in Williams' 1981 game Defender. The hardware features monaural sound and raster graphics on a 19 inch CRT monitor. The machine consists of five circuit boards that coordinate different processes required to operate the game: a main central processing unit (CPU), a read-only memory (ROM) board, a soundboard, an interface controller board, and the power supply. A 1MHz Motorola 6809E microprocessor serves as the main CPU, which executes the game code and assembles the graphics to display on the screen. Sounds are generated in software, with the same routines as in other Williams games of the era. The game uses a priority scheme to determine which sounds to play on a single channel.

The developers added two blitter chips to the Defender hardware in order to improve the graphical capabilities. The blitters generate the on-screen objects and visual effects. Because they transfer memory faster than the CPU, the game is able to simultaneously animate a large number of objects. The unit includes settings to adjust the gameplay difficulty and the point threshold for earning additional game lives. The machine also provides arcade owners with usage statistics, such as the average time per play, which Williams recommended businesses use to gauge when to increase the difficulty setting. A pack of three AA batteries provide power to save the game's settings and high scores when the machine is unplugged from an electrical outlet.

The dual-joystick design was developed by Jarvis. Prior to development, Jarvis injured his right hand in an automobile accident. His hand was still in a cast when he returned to work, which prevented him from using a traditional joystick with a button. While in rehabilitation, he thought of Berzerk. Though Jarvis enjoyed the game and similar titles, he was dissatisfied with the control scheme; Berzerk used a single joystick to move the on-screen character and a button to fire the weapon, which would shoot in the same direction the character was facing. Jarvis noticed that if the button was held down, the character would remain stationary and the joystick could be used to fire in any direction. This method of play inspired Jarvis to add a second joystick dedicated to aiming the direction projectiles were shot. Jarvis and DeMar created a prototype using a Stargate arcade system board and two Atari 2600 controllers attached to a control panel. The final production models use joysticks manufactured by Wico Corporation. In retrospect, Jarvis considers the design a contradiction that blends "incredible freedom of movement" with ease of use.

== Release ==
Williams debuted Robotron at the Amusement Operators Expo in March 1982. The next month, the company filed copyright and trademark requests for individual components of the game. Williams registered the cabinet artwork with the United States Copyright Office on April 12, 1982, followed by the program and game characters on April 22, 1982. It filed the stylized logo with the United States Patent and Trademark Office on April 8, 1982. However, Walt Disney Productions filed a lawsuit against Williams in May 1982, citing Robotron as infringing on the trademark of its film Tron, which was scheduled to release that summer. Williams rebuked the lawsuit as frivolous. The suit was dismissed in the United States District Court in Chicago, Illinois on January 12, 1983 after both sides had reached an agreement.

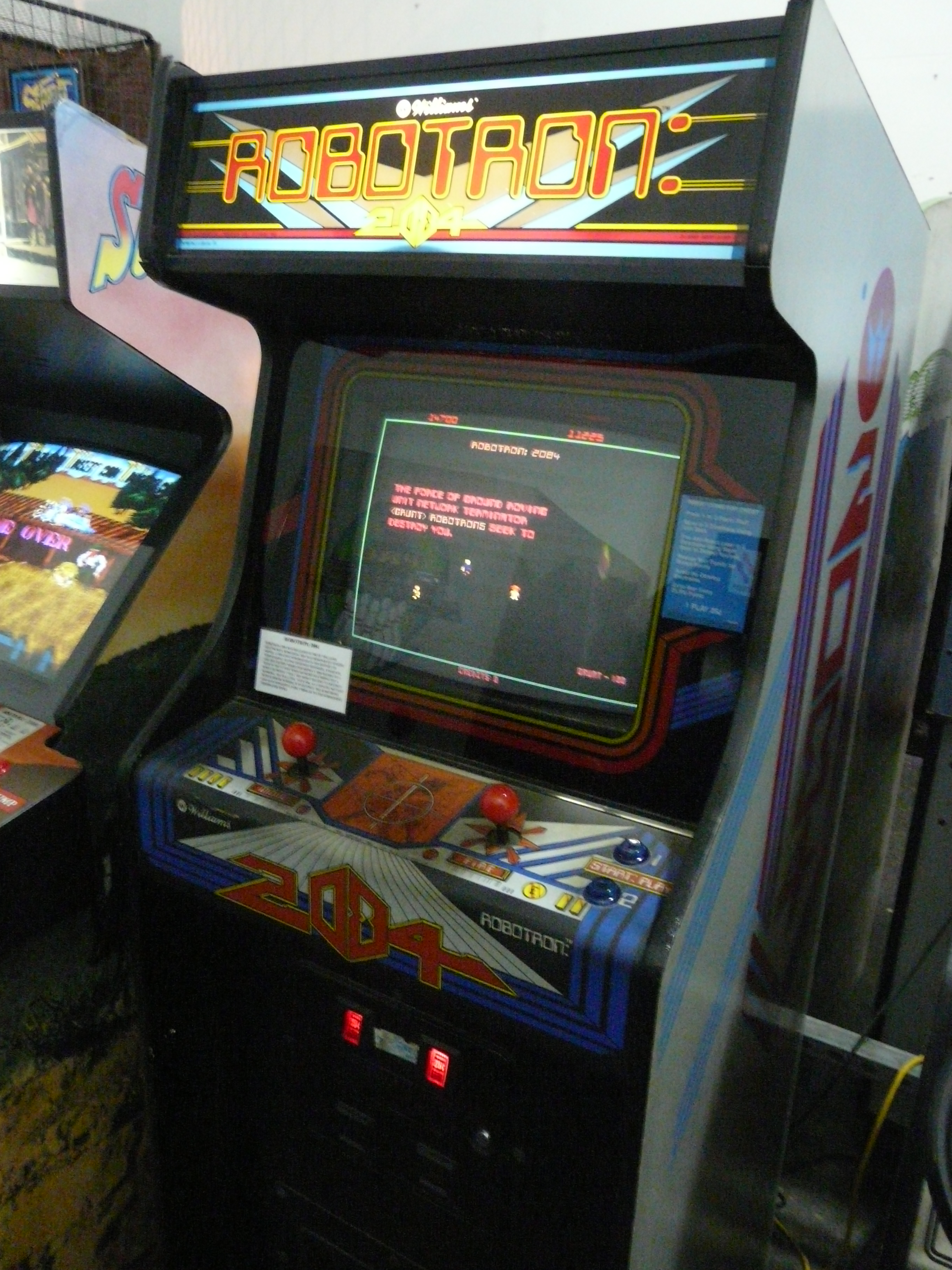
Upright arcade cabinet

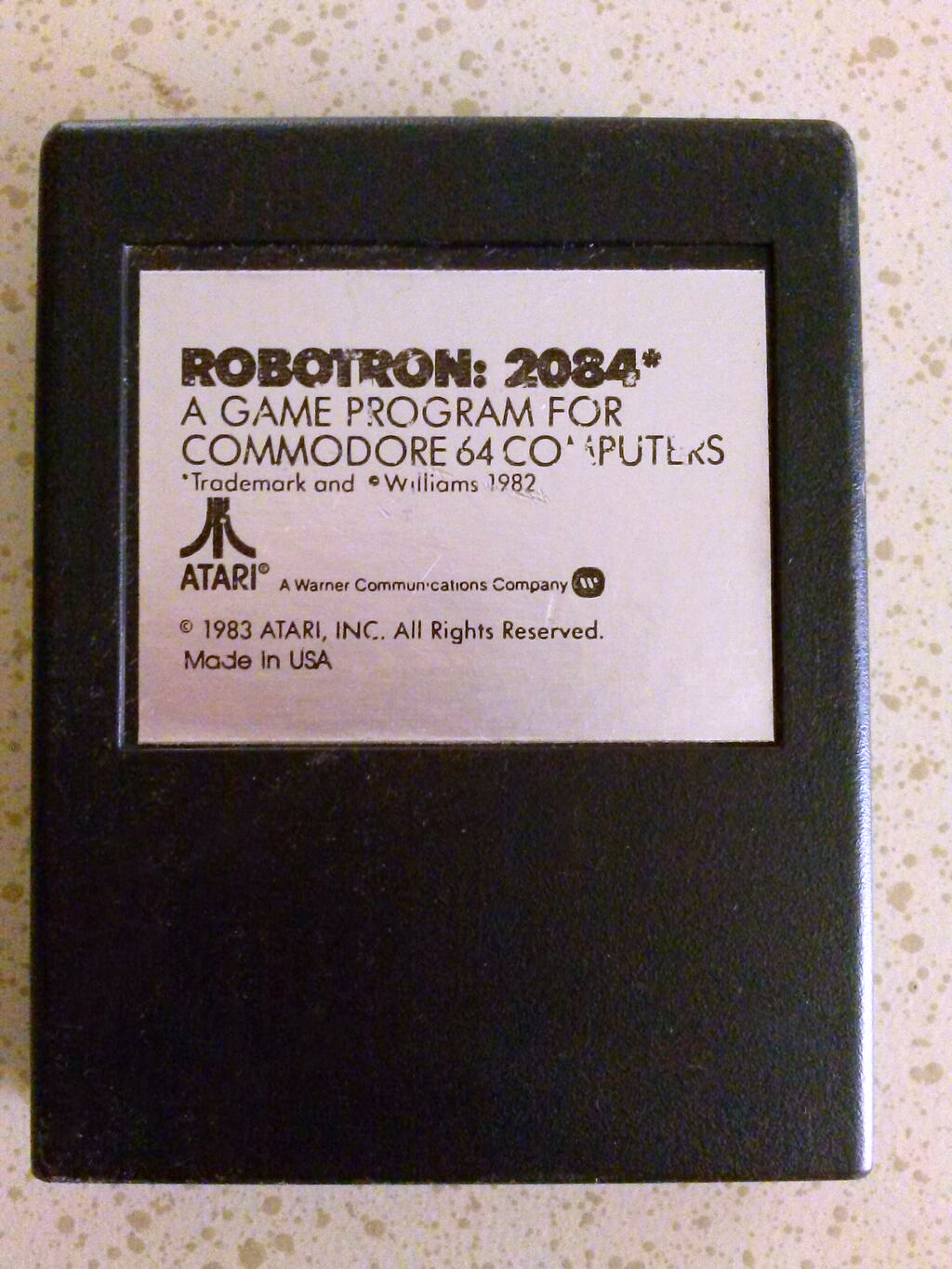
Commodore 64 cartridge released by Atarisoft

Following its release in arcades, Robotron: 2084 was ported to several home console platforms.

The developer promoted the game at the 1982 summer Consumer Electronics Show (CES) in Chicago, Illinois. Williams would go on to sell approximately 19,000 arcade cabinets; mini cabinets and cocktail versions were later produced. Robotron cabinets would become collectors items decades later. While the upright cabinets remained common in 2004, machines in working condition cost more than other games, which video games writer David Ellis attributed to Robotron's enduring popularity. The smaller cabaret and cocktail versions are much rarer and sell for a premium.

=== Ports ===
Atari, Inc. ported Robotron: 2084 to its own home systems, while the company's Atarisoft label released the game for other home computers. The corporation announced versions for the Atari 2600 and 5200 consoles at the 1983 Summer CES trade show in Chicago, Illinois; Atari planned to release them in the second half of the year. However, the 2600 version was never released. The Atari 5200 port released in spring 1984 and included an accessory that holds two joysticks to mimic the arcade controls. The Atari 7800 conversion was promoted as a launch title for the then-new console prior to shipping. It was anticipated to release in the third quarter of 1984. In August 1984, Celeste Dolan reported that it included an accessory similar to the 5200 version. Programmed by David Brown, the game was eventually released in 1986 (Note: The Atari 7800 console was planned to release in 1984 but was delayed until 1986 due to contract issues.) without the controller accessory. Atari Corporation later published a Lynx port programmed by Dave Dies in 1991.

Atari promoted Atarisoft versions for various systems at the 1984 Winter CES in Las Vegas. The company assigned the various system ports to different programmers; for example, Judy Bogart, Steven Hays, and Tom Griner handled the conversions to Atari 8-bit, Apple II, and Commodore 64 home computers, respectively. Among those released was a conversion for the older VIC-20 home computer. A TI-99/4A version was planned but canceled early in 1984. The company considered a ZX Spectrum port after briefly entering the market with arcade conversions. Following the release of Silicon Kid's Wild West Hero—an unlicensed Robotron clone—in 1983, Atarisoft threatened the creators with legal action. To avoid a court case, Silicon Kid's programmer, Paul Holmes, worked with Atarisoft to modify the game into an official Robotron: 2084 port. However, Atarisoft exited the Spectrum market prior to publication. Video game journalist Stuart Campbell obtained a completed copy in the 1980s and provided it to Holmes over 15 years later. They then published the game online for the Spectrum emulation community.

Robotron: 2084 has been included in several multi-platform compilations: the 1996 Williams Arcade's Greatest Hits, the 2000 Midway's Greatest Arcade Hits, the 2003 Midway Arcade Treasures, and the 2012 Midway Arcade Origins. Many of the anthologies were created by Digital Eclipse, who used emulation to run the original source code. The company included Robotron because of its high recognizability. In 2000, a web-based version of Robotron, along with nine other classic arcade games, were published on Shockwave.com, Macromedia's game portal that used its Shockwave platform. Four years later, Midway Games (Note: Williams Electronics changed its name to WMS Industries in 1987, and after purchasing Midway in 1988, later transferred its games to a new Midway Games subsidiary.) also launched a website featuring the Shockwave versions.

In 2004, Midway Games planned to release a plug and play version of Robotron: 2084 as part of a line of TV Games; however, it remained unreleased by 2009. The game became available for download via Microsoft's Xbox Live Arcade in November 2005. It featured high-definition graphics, online scoreboards, and two-player cooperative multiplayer with one player controlling the movement and another the shooting. Microsoft later removed the game from the service in February 2010 citing permission issues. Robotron: 2084, along with many other Midway arcade games, appear in the 2016 Midway Arcade expansion of Lego Dimensions. The developer, Traveller's Tales, considered recreating them in Lego form but decided to present them in their original forms to maintain what they felt made the games good. Lego versions of Robotron characters appear outside the emulated games in the expansion's virtual Lego world. In 2021, the game joined other classic arcade games on the Antstream Arcade gaming platform. It left the service in 2023 after the licensing agreement expired. A homebrew enthusiast created a port for the ColecoVision home console in 2022.

== Reception ==
Contemporary Reception

Review scores
Publication	Score
ACE	Lynx: 837/1000
Tilt	Arcade: 2/6
Play Meter	4/4

Robotron garnered praise soon after its debut. Steve Bloom of Video Games magazine proclaimed it the "best new game" at the Amusement Operators Expo and noted that attendees constantly played it. Video game critic Bill Kunkel praised Robotron as the best coin-operated game of the year after the 1982 Summer CES. Similarly, Owen Linzmayer of Creative Computing Video & Arcade Games called it "one of the most dazzling arcade games released" that year. Writing for RePlay Magazine, Todd Erickson noted that Williams' early use of difficulty settings in its arcade machines set it apart from other manufacturers by providing flexibility. He cited Robotron as an example, noting that arcade owners had increased their income by steadily intensifying the challenge from lower settings.

The gameplay was overall well received. Bloom believed the gameplay—which he described as an amalgam of Tempest, Defender, and Berzerk—would propel Robotron to success. Kunkel lauded the game for its "easy to play, difficult to master" gameplay in a review for Electronic Games. While he acknowledge comparisons to Berzerk, Kunkel described Robotron's design as more intense, attributing the game's "high-powered excitement" to the dual-joystick controls. Linzmayer praised the freedom of movement afforded by the controls. Writing for Play Meter, Roger Sharpe characterized the gameplay as polarizing; while some players would be turned off by the challenge and highly active screen, many would continually insert quarters regardless of their success at the game. Similarly, he noted that the dexterity required to use two joysticks would be difficult for some but appealed to those looking for more simplistic controls. Philippe Adjutor, a reviewer for French magazine Tilt, praised the game's simplicity and addictiveness, calling it well-designed. However, he rated the game low and described the gameplay as more reflex-based than tactical. Almost two years later, Jean Michel Navarre of Tilt included Robotron in the war games section of his imaginary arcade museum, citing the game's scenario.

Robotron's graphics were also a common point of praise. Kunkel described the visuals as groundbreaking for the amount of moving onscreen characters and the use of colors. Linzmayer called the graphics "stunning". Sharpe praised Robotron's colorfulness as "bright" and "lively". He called out the visual effect when completing a wave as "worth the price of admission." Discussing the evolution of video game graphics, JoyStik magazine staff cited Robotron as an example of dynamic color, a new advancement in graphics at the time. They specifically drew attention to effects during a Brain Wave, which use color variety and quick color changes to create a shimmering white effect.

The ports also received an overall positive contemporary reception. The Video Game Update's writer praised the Apple port's graphics and gameplay. They summarized the review urging fans of the arcade to play the "excellent translation". ACE magazine staff praised the quality of the conversion to the 8-bit Atari XE in 1987 but mentioned that the game was showing its age. Reviewing the Lynx release, ACE's David Upchurch commented that despite the poor graphics and basic design, the gameplay's simplicity was a strong point. While he lauded the addictiveness and audio, Upchurch acknowledged that some players may find the difficulty too challenging.

Robotron's inclusion in the various releases of Williams Arcade's Greatest Hits was well received by gaming publications. Next Generation magazine staff praised the "arcade-perfect" conversion of the PC and Macintosh releases and noted the historical importance, calling it one of the "greatest arcade classics". Reviewing the Sega Genesis conversion, GamePro's Captain Cameron singled out Robotron: 2084 as the best of the anthology. Four Electronic Gaming Monthly reviewers—Shawn Smith, Dan Hsu, Crispin Boyer, and Sushi-X—were enthusiastic about the port, calling it an arcade-perfect conversion and a technical achievement. Hsu and Boyer praised the gameplay but recommended playing Robotron with a six-button controller as the standard three-button controller made the game too difficult. While Robin Alway of GamesMaster and Official Dreamcast Magazine's Alex Huhtala were both critical of the Dreamcast compilation, they considered Robotron an exception; Alway called it one of the few "all-time classics" in the collection, and Huhtala wrote that Robotron's gameplay holds up against contemporary standards.

=== Retrospective ===
Retrospective Reception

Review scores
Publication	Score
AllGame	Arcade: 5/5; 7800: 2.5/5
Eurogamer	Arcade: 10/10

The game has received a positive retrospective reception decades after its release as well. Authors Rusel DeMaria and Johnny Wilson enjoyed the excitement created by the constant waves of robots and fear of the character dying. They called it one of the more impressive games from its era. Digital media professor John Vince considered the reward system and strategic elements as positive components. DeMaria and Wilson considered the control scheme a highlight that provided a tactical advantage. Similarly, Retro Gamer writers described the control systems as "one of the greatest". In retrospect, DeMar felt players continued to play the game because the control scheme offered a high level of precision.

Chris Wilkins of Eurogamer called Robotron the "epitome of organised chaos" and the "ultimate in twitch gaming". In scoring the arcade game a perfect ten, he cited the balanced gameplay, addictiveness, and exquisite cabinet design. Allgame's Brett Alan Weiss also gave the arcade version a perfect score. In calling it among the "most exciting and intense" games in the industry, he lauded the audiovisuals and "mercilessly addictive gameplay". Writing for Retro Gamer, Craig Grannell noted that most early conversions did not have dual joysticks like the arcade and were received less favorably by critics. Weiss rated the Atari 7800 port lower than the original arcade. While he acknowledged those new to Robotron: 2084 would enjoy this port, he felt the lack of the plastic holder, which Atari had included in the 5200 release a few years earlier, was a major detractor. Grannell expressed surpise that Robotron was ported to the VIC-20. While he commented that it was "not bad", he criticized the character's ability to move.

The game received praise from industry professionals as well. Midway Games' Tony Dormanesh and Electronic Arts' Stephen Riesenberger called Robotron: 2084 their favorite arcade game. David Thiel, a former Gottlieb audio engineer, referred to the game as the "pinnacle of interactive game design". Archer Maclean was a great admirer of Jarvis's early video games, like Robotron, because of their graphical effects and gameplay. Christian Donlan of Eurogamer noted that Maclean never moved into a studio without installing the arcade cabinet. Similarly, Donlan observed a Robotron cabinet in the headquarters of PopCap Games. In addition to praising the playing field design, Jeff Peters from GearWorks Games described the gameplay's required strategy and dexterity as a challenge to the senses. He summarized the game as "one of the best examples of game play design and execution."

Several publications have included Robotron among the top video games released. In 1995, Flux magazine staff ranked the arcade version 52nd on their "Top 100 Video Games" feature, calling it a "two-joystick terror" that had yet to be topped. The following year, Next Generation staff listed the arcade and PlayStation versions as number 63 on their "Top 100 Games of All Time", citing the game's constant action and dual joystick controls. Two years later, they ranked it number 21 on a similar "Top 50" list, describing Robotron as the pinnacle of "tension and challenge" as well as the "most intense interactive entertainment experience ever created". Game Informer staff ranked the game 72nd in its "Top 100 Games of All Time" special feature in 2001, calling it the "pinnacle of relentless arcade action". In 2007, the readers and writers of Edge magazine ranked Robotron 81st on their "100 Best Video Games" because of the execution of its control scheme. The next year, Guinness World Records named it the number eleven arcade game in technical, creative and cultural impact. Also in 2008, Retro Gamer staff rated the game the second top arcade game, citing its simple and addictive design.

== Legacy ==
Jarvis's contributions to the game's development are often cited among his accolades. Vince considered him one of the originators of "high-action" and "reflex-based" arcade games, citing Robotron: 2084's gameplay among other games designed by Jarvis. It was listed as one of Jarvis's achievements when he was awarded the Lifetime Achievement Award at the 2005 Game Developers Choice Awards. In 2007, IGN writers named Jarvis the tenth top game designer whose titles, including Robotron 2084, have influenced the industry. GamesTM's retro staff referred to the game as the "pinnacle" of his career.

Players have competed to obtain the highest score at the game. Video game magazines tracked high scores soon after the game's release. Scores for Robotron, among many popular games, were tracked at the Video Championship, a long-distance competition between players in California and North Carolina, in August 1982. Twin Galaxies, who officiated and tracked competitive high scores for players, recorded high scores for the arcade version into the 2010s. Because of its popularity, Robotron has been referenced in facets of popular culture: the Beastie Boys' song "The Sounds of Science" on the album Paul's Boutique, Lou Reed's song "Down at the Arcade" on his New Sensations album, and the comic strip Bob the Angry Flower. The characters make a cameo appearance during the climax of the 2015 feature film Pixels.

=== Sequels and remakes ===
Vid Kidz developed a sequel, Blaster, in 1983. Thematically similar to Defender, the game is a 3D shooter that takes place in a world overrun by Robotrons a year after the original. The player flies a ship through space defeating enemies and rescuing lost spacemen. Jarvis planned to develop more sequels, but the video game crash of 1983 halted most video game production for a few years. Williams considered creating a second sequel in the mid-1980s, as well as a film adaptation. The company planned to sell an arcade conversion kit for games with a vertically oriented monitor, which had become popular following the 1983 crash. Management felt that a sequel would improve the kit's saleability and considered a follow up to either Robotron: 2084 or Joust, ultimately choosing the latter.

A 3D remake, Robotron X, was released in 1996 and features gameplay similar to the original.

Atari Corporation and Williams Entertainment (Note: WMS Industries acquired Tradewest in 1994, renaming it Williams Entertainment as a new subsidiary to release home ports of its arcade games.) announced plans at the end of 1994 to develop an update of Robotron for the Atari Jaguar and high performance PCs. However, the update—Robotron X—was released on the Sony PlayStation console in 1996. Developed by Player 1, Robotron X is a 3D remake featuring new enemies and stages that was also released on Windows PCs in 1997. The game was later ported to the Nintendo 64 in 1998 as Robotron 64. Ian Morrison programmed both versions.

=== Industry impact ===
Video game journalists consider Robotron: 2084 an impactful game within the industry. Bill Loguidice and Matt Barton of Gamasutra commented that Robotron's success, along with Defender, illustrated that players were ready for more difficult games with complex controls. Also writing for Gamasutra, John Harris observed several action games, such as Ikari Warriors, Gauntlet, and Alien Syndrome, featuring hordes of enemies swarming the player character after Robotron's release.

Though not the first to implement it, (Note: The two-joystick control scheme was previously used in Taito's Gun Fight in 1975 as well as Artic Electronics' Mars in 1981.) Robotron's use of dual joysticks popularized the design among 2D shooting games and has since been copied by other arcade-style games. For example, Taito released two games in arcades with similar control schemes later in 1982: Space Dungeon and Front Line. The next year, Atari released its own twin-stick shooter, Black Widow. Soon after, Atari released a conversion kit to change Robotron arcade machines, as well as several other Williams games, into its new multidirectional shooter, Cloak & Dagger. Midway Games also implemented the control scheme in several of its later titles. The 1990 arcade game Smash TV, also designed by Jarvis, features a similar gameplay and hardware design as well as ideas he intended to include in Robotron sequels. Other Midway Games releases include Inferno and Total Carnage.

The input design was prominent in arcades until games with 3D graphics became popular in the late 1990s. Conversely, this trend did not extend to the home market at the time, which Jarvis attributed to the absence of hardware with two side-by-side joysticks. Exceptions include the 1984 clone Cybotron and Jeff Minter's 1991 donationware Llamatron, both of which include an option that emulates Robotron's original design by using a second joystick. Minter released an upgraded version titled Minotron: 2112 for iOS twenty years later that reproduces the dual joystick design with touchscreen controls. Most 3D games, however, use the dual joystick scheme to control the movement of a character and a camera. Few console games, like the 2004 Jet Li: Rise to Honor, use two joysticks for movement and attacking. Following the debut of Xbox Live Arcade and PlayStation Network, many shooting games appeared on the online services using this dual control design. The 2003 Geometry Wars and its sequels were at the forefront of the control scheme's revival.
