= Blaster (video game) =

1983 video game

- Developer: Vid Kidz
- Publisher: Williams Electronics
- Designers: Eugene Jarvis; Larry DeMar
- Platform: Arcade
- Release: NA: September 13, 1983
- Genre: Shoot 'em up
- Modes: Single-player, multiplayer

Blaster is a first-person rail shooter released as an arcade video game by Williams Electronics in 1983. It was developed by Eugene Jarvis and Larry DeMar. A vague sequel to Robotron: 2084, the game is a shoot 'em up set in outer space. The goal is to destroy enemies, avoid obstacles, and rescue astronauts in twenty levels, to reach paradise.

The game uses large, scaled sprites to give the impression of attackers and asteroids approaching the player's ship. It was originally written for the Atari 8-bit computers–something not made public until 2004. Neither the Atari 8-bit nor the arcade machine has bitmap scaling hardware; everything is drawn using the CPU.

Blaster was sold in both Duramold and, much less commonly, traditional wooden cabinets. Cabinet art was done by Tom Schmelzer and Larry Day of Advertising Posters in Chicago.

== Plot ==
According to the opening demo:

It is the year 2085. The Robotrons have destroyed the human race. You escape in a stolen space shuttle. Your destination: Paradise. A remote outpost 20 million light years away. Does paradise exist? Can civilization be started again? These questions will be answered at the end of your journey. But first, you must BLAST... OR BE BLASTED!

This implies that the game takes place after the events of Robotron: 2084, but aside from a few oversized G.R.U.N.T. robots in the first stage, none of the Robotron characters make an appearance in Blaster.

== Gameplay ==
The game is controlled with an optical joystick and two buttons: fire and thrust. The ship's weapon fires from a linear bank of four pyramid-shaped shots. Shots do not emanate toward the exact center of the screen; the first shot in the series will be furthest left, while the fourth will be furthest right. The Blastership is given three lives, and extra lives are awarded every 100,000 points. The player has a life bar, in likeness to similar games such as Star Fox, but in this implementation, the life bar represents three hit points and not a continuum of health points. When the ship gets hit a second time the text "ENERGY CRITICAL" will be flashed on-screen. Almost everything in the game can be destroyed, from the asteroids to enemy shots. The latter is a critical component of surviving for an extended period of time.

Marooned astronauts can be rescued by interception. They are initially worth 1,000 points, which is incremented by 200 points for each subsequent rescue during the same life, for a maximum value of 2,000 points per rescue. Any situation where enemies appear in groups offers additional bonuses for destroying all enemies in the group. In some levels, such as the Saucerland waves, there are conditions that necessitate a certain order for the ships to be destroyed. In most of the levels, a large blue 'E' decorated with arcs of lightning can be found. Shooting these 'E's will fill the shields while colliding with them will cause the player to warp to the next wave. Before warping, every object in the level will turn into 'E's, and the ship will speed against a backdrop of a field of E with Energizers.

== Development ==
Blaster was originally programmed by Vid Kidz for Atari 8-bit computers and the Atari 5200 console, and then converted to the arcade version. It was the third and last release by Vid Kidz. The Atari versions were cancelled during corporate shuffling following the video game crash of 1983; they were eventually found and released to the public in 2004.

The Motorola 6809 of the arcade machine runs at 1 MHz, "and man did it hurt", according to Jarvis.

During the initial testing phase, Blaster contained 30 levels. In an interview in Midway Arcade Treasures, Larry Demar explained that the game originally allowed continuing play by inserting another quarter. The game was shortened to 20 levels so the player could finish the game in one credit.

Only three cockpit (sit-down) machines ever produced. One is on display in Palo Alto, California in the home of Jarvis's father and the second was converted into a machine for Devastator, a prototype game that was never released. According to Jarvis, there have been unconfirmed sightings of the third.

== Reception ==
Gene Lewin of Play Meter magazine reviewed the arcade game in 1983, scoring it 3 out of 10 as a dedicated arcade cabinet, but would raise it to 8 out of 10 if released as a conversion kit. The review called it a space shoot-em-up with "good" graphics and sound effects.

== Legacy ==
Blaster was one of the video games featured on the television game show Starcade.

The game is included in Arcade's Greatest Hits: The Midway Collection 2 for the PlayStation in 1997, and also available on the PlayStation 2, GameCube, Windows, and Xbox as part of Midway Arcade Treasures in 2003.

== See also ==
- Buck Rogers: Planet of Zoom (1982) – third-person rail shooter with sprite scaling
- Space Harrier (1985) – relies on sprite-scaling hardware for the visuals
