= Robotron 64 =

1998 video game

- Developer: Player 1
- Publishers: NA: Crave Entertainment; EU: GT Interactive
- Platform: Nintendo 64
- Release: NA: January 5, 1998; EU: June 1998
- Genre: Multidirectional shooter
- Mode: Single-player

Robotron 64 is a 1998 multidirectional shooter for the Nintendo 64. It is a port of Robotron X, which itself is an updated version of the 1982 dual-stick shooter Robotron: 2084. The game was originally scheduled to be released by Midway Games in the summer of 1997, but the game was put on hiatus before it would see a new publisher and a release date of January 5, 1998.

== Plot ==
The player is a mutant scientist trapped in another dimension trying to save the last human family. His mutant powers allow him to defeat the evil robots that are trying to kill all of humanity.

== Gameplay ==
Robotron 64 uses the dual-stick control scheme of the original Robotron. The player has the option to use a single controller using the analog stick for movement and the C-buttons for firing, or use two controllers to allow use of both analog sticks for movement and shooting.

The soundtrack consists of electronica and techno music.

== Reception ==
Reception

Aggregate score
Aggregator	Score
Metacritic	72/100

Review scores
Publication	Score
Electronic Gaming Monthly	7.75/10
Game Informer	5.5/10
GameSpot	5.9/10
Hyper	65%
IGN	6.9/10
N64 Magazine	75%
Next Generation	3/5
Nintendo Power	2.275/5

Reviews for Robotron 64 were mostly positive, though many critics questioned whether the game ultimately offered anything over the original Robotron 2084. Dan Hsu proclaimed in Electronic Gaming Monthly, "Finally, a good update of Robotron! This version fixes all of the problems that plagued the PS version. R64 is fast, frantic and sure as hell hard to put down." Nintendo Power likewise described it as "just as fast and wild" as Robotron 2084, while having upgraded graphics. Next Generation was more measured in its praise: "Add to that new bosses and power-ups, hundreds of levels, and a decent non-stop techno soundtrack, and this tiny 4MB cart stands as proof that size isn't everything – it's what you do with it that counts. It still may not improve on the original, but it's much better than expected." On the negative end of the spectrum, Hsu's co-reviewer Sushi-X criticized the low difficulty and the lack of the full-screen overhead view of Robotron 2084 and summed up Robotron 64 as "one last attempt at reviving a game that seems better left to fond memories." Jeff Gerstmann, reviewing the game for GameSpot, also felt it was too easy and concluded it "simply isn't up to snuff. You'd be better off playing the original Robotron 2084." The game holds 72/100 on the review aggregation website Metacritic based on six reviews.

GamePro disagreed about the game being easy, arguing that it only appears easy because the first 30 levels allow the player to breeze through while accumulating a number of surplus extra lives, and that the remaining 170 levels, which comprise the bulk of the game, are a challenge to master. While noting the music is a little repetitive, critics overwhelmingly praised it for its appropriately frenzied pace and mood. Gerstmann disagreed, saying the music is hampered by the storage limitations of the cartridge medium. The vast majority of critics found the graphics to be functional but wholly unimpressive, though there was a dissenting voice on this point as well, with GamePro applauding how well the character graphics and animation stand out among the game's chaotic action.

Other commonly praised elements of the game included the huge number of stages and the way the camera views provide a much better view of the action than the PlayStation's Robotron X. However, the most widely acclaimed feature of the game was the ability to use two controllers at once, which critics said evokes memories of the original Robotron 2084 arcade machine's dual joysticks while giving the control an impressive level of analog depth. Matt Casamassina of IGN, for example, commented that "It sounds odd, but it is absolutely ingenious and replicates the same double-joystick control of the original arcade machine. It allows for so much movement possibility that addiction is inevitable."
