= ENER 1000 =

- Developer: University of Coimbra
- Type: Personal computer
- Released: 1982; 44 years ago
- Discontinued: 1985
- Units sold: >100
- Operating system: CP/M
- CPU: Zilog Z80A
- Memory: 64 KB RAM
- Removable storage: Two 5 1/4-inch double-density floppy disk drives
- Connectivity: Serial interface
- Dimensions: 50 x 36 x 15 cm
- Website: dei.uc.pt/museu/do-ener-ao-espaco/

The ENER 1000 was a Portuguese computer released in 1982. It was based on the Zilog Z80A processor. It had 64 KB RAM and two 5 1/4-inch double-density floppy disk drives. It ran the CP/M operating system.

The machine was developed at University of Coimbra by a team led by João Gabriel Silva, and sold through Enertrónica after 1982. More than 100 units were sold. It came with software for stock management, salary processing, and accounting.

In January 1983 the machine was announced and received the 1st prize for innovation at the Portuguese Electronics Trade Fair Endiel (Encontro Nacional para o Desenvolvimento das Indústrias Elétricas e Eletrónicas).

In 1984, a dozen of ENER 1000 were distributed to some secondary schools. In 1985 the ENER 1000 project ended and a more evolved version, the UNIC, started.

== Characteristics ==
The machine was based on eurocard cards (10 x 16 cm) connected to the motherboard using up to 8 DIN 41612 connectors. The desktop box measured 50 x 36 x 15 cm and could house up to 8 cards. There were two internal 5 1/4-inch double-density floppy disk drives (1.6 Mb capacity).

=== Minimal configuration ===
The minimal configuration used only 4 slots:

- CPU card with a Zilog Z80A processor and 2K EPROM
- 64/128 KB DRAM card
- double serial interface card
- floppy disc controller card

The later version of the computer could function as a multi-station machine, supporting up to 4 users.

=== Expansion modules ===
Some custom built modules were available for expansion:

- FPU
- 6809 CPU with 4K EPROM, 2K RAM e timer;
- 16K static RAM/ROM;
- alphanumeric and graphic unit for spectral plots;
- light pen;
- fast ADC for Nuclear Physics applications;
- four 8bit DACs;
- local network node;
- Winchester 5" 1/4 controller;
- CRT and keyboard controller;
- 8088 CPU;
- synchronous serial ports (HDLC and SDLC);
- 12-bit A/D and D/A converters;
- DMA controller
