= Robotron X =

1996 video game

- North American PlayStation box art
- Developer: Player 1 (Note: Development assisted by Leland Interactive Media.)
- Publishers: NA: Midway Home Entertainment; EU: GT Interactive
- Platforms: PlayStation, Windows
- Release: PlayStation: NA: December 24, 1996; PAL: March 1997; Windows: NA: 1997
- Genre: Twin-stick shooter
- Modes: Single-player, multiplayer

Robotron X is a twin-stick shooter video game co-developed by Leland Interactive Media and Player 1 and it was released by Midway Games in November 1996 for the PlayStation. It is a 3D version of the 1982 arcade video game Robotron: 2084. GT Interactive published a Windows port in 1997. A Nintendo 64 version was released in 1998 as Robotron 64, and Crave Entertainment bought out the publishing rights to the N64 version.

== Gameplay ==
The gameplay is similar to the original, but with 3D graphics.

Robotron X features updated graphics and audio, and also multiple different angles for the camera.

== Reception ==
Reception

Review scores
Publication	Score
Electronic Gaming Monthly	6.5/10, 6.5/10, 6.5/10, 5.5/10 (PS)
Next Generation	3/5 (PS)

While the game uses gameplay similar to the original, Robotron X was not as well-received, though reviews for it ranged from mixed to positive. Andrew Rollings and Ernest Adams felt that the moving camera featured in the 3D environment was a negative, and that the original overhead perspective format of a single screen actually presented all the information a player and relied more on the skill of the player. They felt that the moving camera angle obscured playing field areas which would make it hard for the player to avoid being shot when an enemy appears suddenly. Some critics cited this as the game's one major flaw. John Vince felt the same way, stating that gameplay suffered due to missing important aspects that the original had. Rollings and Adams instead attribute the late 1990s fad involving classic video game remakes in part to the release of Robotron X, though at the time of that release it was believed this fad was already in place.

Aaron Curtiss for the Los Angeles Times recommended the game for fans of the original, but thought that others would decry it as "mindless".

Bro' Buzz for GamePro was complimentary to its gameplay and graphics.

Malcolm Mayhew for the Fort Worth Star-Telegram gave the game 2 1/2 stars, saying that the game had good idea, but bad execution.

== See also ==
- Centipede X and Joust X
