= Vid Kidz =

American video game developer

Vid Kidz was an American video game developer formed in 1981 by Defender programmers Eugene Jarvis and Larry DeMar, following their departure from Williams Electronics. Williams contracted with Vid Kidz to design games for them. Vid Kidz was disbanded in 1984.

== Games developed by Vid Kidz ==
- Defender (1981) – developed by Jarvis and DeMar, but before the formation of Vid Kidz, while they were still at Williams.
- Stargate (1981, AKA Defender II)
- Robotron: 2084 (1982)
- Blaster (1983)
