= Anarchism (disambiguation) =

Anarchism is a political philosophy and movement that seeks to abolish all institutions that perpetuate authority, coercion, or hierarchy, primarily targeting the state and capitalism.

Anarchism may also refer to:

- Anarchism (Eltzbacher book), a 1900 survey of anarchism by Paul Eltzbacher
- Anarchism (Miller book), a 1984 survey of anarchism by David Miller
- Anarchism (Ritter book), a 1981 book on anarchism as a political theory by Alan Ritter
- Anarchism (Woodcock book), a 1962 history of anarchism by George Woodcock

== See also ==
- Anarchist (disambiguation)
- Anarchy (disambiguation)
