= Definition of anarchism and libertarianism =

Anarchism and libertarianism, as broad political ideologies with manifold historical and contemporary meanings, have contested definitions. Their adherents have a pluralistic and overlapping tradition that makes the precise definition of the political ideology difficult or impossible, compounded by a lack of common features, the differing priorities of its subgroups, the lack of academic acceptance, and contentious historical usage.

== Overview ==
"Anarchism" generally refers to the anti-authoritarian (libertarian) wing of the socialist movement. (Note: Levy & Adams 2018, p. 104: "As such, many people use the term 'anarchism' to describe the anti-authoritarian wing of the socialist movement."; Marshall 1992, p. 641: "In general, anarchism is closer to socialism than liberalism. ... Anarchism finds itself largely in the socialist camp, but it also has outriders in liberalism. It cannot be reduced to socialism, and is best seen as a separate and distinctive doctrine."; Cohn 2009, p. 4: "... from the 1890s on, the term 'libertarian socialism' has entered common use as a synonym for anarchism."; Chomsky 2005, p. 123: Modern anarchism is "the libertarian wing of socialism".) "Libertarian socialism" has been a synonym for "anarchism" since 1890, as has the term "libertarian" through the mid-20th century.

The terms "anarchism" and "libertarianism" represent broad political ideologies with multiple historical and contemporary meanings. Incompatibilities within their pluralistic tradition prove difficult or impossible to reconcile into a singular set of core beliefs. The range of ideological disparities within anarchism is often paradoxical and never fully coherent. All anarchists are opposed to hierarchy and capitalism, but differ in how they believe that change should be made.

Other complicating factors in defining "anarchism" include disagreement over its status as a political ideology and contention over the term's historical usage. Anarchism's rejection of the state and state policy largely sits outside the purview of political scientists and in some formulations, its misconstruction as the antithesis of politics contributes to its marginalization as a political ideology.

== History of usage ==
Since the 19th century, "libertarian" has referred to advocates for freedom of the will, or anyone who generally advocated for liberty. The first person to call themselves a "libertarian" in the political sense was Joseph Déjacque in 1857. Shortly after, in 1858, he created the New York anarchist journal Le Libertaire. Anarchist Sébastien Faure used the term later in the century to differentiate between anarchists and authoritarian socialists. While the term "libertarian" has been largely synonymous with anarchism, (Note: Marshall 1992, p. 641: "For a long time, libertarian was interchangeable in France with anarchist but in recent years, its meaning has become more ambivalent."; Cohn 2009, p. 6: "'libertarianism' ... a term that, until the mid-twentieth century, was synonymous with "anarchism" per se") its meaning has more recently diluted with wider adoption from ideologically disparate groups. For example, "libertarians" include both the New Left Marxists (who do not associate with authoritarian socialists or a vanguard party) and extreme liberals (primarily concerned with civil liberties). Additionally, some anarchists use "libertarian socialist" to avoid anarchism's negative connotations and emphasize its connections with socialism.

Anarchism retains a historical association with chaos and violence. In the late 1800s, prominent anarchist Peter Kropotkin noted the popular connotations of "anarchy" as a synonym for chaos and disorder, and thus a disadvantageous name for a movement. He accepted the term despite this, just as the Dutch Sea Beggars and sans-culottes had their own names conferred. Anarchists throughout the 20th century have regretted the philosophy's association with chaos, explosives, wanton violence, and marauding. These connotations endure contemporaneously through the popular media's association of black bloc property destruction with the movement. As a result of anarchy's dual definitions, the idea of a society without central authority is endemically conflated with chaos, hampering one's ability to conceive of the former positively.

Popular use of anarchist symbols have also affected the connotations of the term divorced from its theoretical background and history as a movement. The influence of anarchism in 20th-century punk subcultures led to anarchy and the circle-A symbol as a trope in the music and fashion industries to represent teen angst and shallow, youthful rebellion.

The term "anarchist" is also used as a pejorative empty signifier to show abrasive disdain. The term's association with societal malady has been, in part, an intentional strategy by its detractors to discredit it. "Libertarian" saw a similar diffusion of purpose within the American libertarian movement as a wider group less studied and less interested in minimal government adopted the term, diluting the potency of its association with the strict rights-based libertarianism of Ayn Rand and Murray Rothbard. Anarcho-capitalists and those who believe in abolition of the state have occupied the fringe of the libertarian movement.

The revival of free-market ideologies during the mid-to-late 20th century came with disagreement over what to call the movement. While many of its adherents, especially in the United States, prefer "libertarian", many Conservative libertarians reject the term's association with the 1960s New Left and its connotations of libertine hedonism. The movement is divided over the use of "Conservative" as an alternative. Those who seek both economic and social liberty would be known as classical "liberals", but that term developed associations opposite of the limited government, low-taxation, minimal state advocated by the movement. Name variants of the free-market revival movement include classical liberalism, economic liberalism, free-market liberalism and neoliberalism. "Libertarian" has the most colloquial acceptance to describe a member of the movement, or "economic libertarian", based on both the ideology's primacy of economics and its distinction from libertarians of the New Left.

Though many contemporary antiglobalization activists actively identify as "anarchists", many others use anarchist principles and strategies without formally adopting the label, preferring instead terms including "antiauthoritarian", "autonomist", "libertarian socialist", or no label. These activists display anarchistic sensibilities and follow in anarchism's tradition of anti-authoritarianism, anti-capitalism, anti-oppression, and anti-imperialism without explicitly defining themselves as ideologically anarchist.

== Relation with socialism ==
In the 19th century, "anarchism" and "socialism" were used interchangeably, both treated as similar threats to sociopolitical order despite their differences in views towards the state. Similarly, classical anarchism is synonymous with "libertarian socialism" in their shared commitments to autonomy and freedom, decentralization, opposing hierarchy, and opposing the vanguardism of authoritarian socialism. Generally, libertarian socialism expands to include classical anarchism, council communism, Italian autonomists, and the Marxism of Luxemburg, Mattick, and Gramsci. While there are differences between each, including whether their adherents personally identify as fully "anarchist" or "Marxist", each still classifies as anti-authoritarian socialism. Classical anarchism is distinguished from general Marxism by its opposition to centralized or authoritarian organizational structures and "the dominion of man over man". Socialist-aligned forms of anarchism are also known as "social anarchism".

The terms "anarchist" and "Marxist" originally signified factions within the First International without a theoretical basis. At this time, the anarchists were the left wing of the socialist movement. The Russian anti-authoritarian Mikhail Bakunin argued that the International was an authoritarian organization controlled by Karl Marx, a German. The term "Marxist" first appeared in French in 1872 to associate the anti-Bakuninist group within the International. The Marxists, in return, used the pejorative "anarchist" to label the Bakuninists. These distinctions were further conflated across state lines, such that the French anarchists conflated "Marxist" with "German". A schism between "anarchist" and "socialist" affiliation was formalized with the Second International's 1896 London Congress.

The biggest divide in the definition of anarchism is between the main individualist and socialist anarchist traditions. While anarchism sits between liberalism and socialism, the definitive extent of its affiliation with either is contested. Historians (Rocker and Woodcock) have described anarchism as the confluence of liberal individualism and socialist egalitarianism. Other activists and theorists have variously argued that one tradition is "genuine anarchism" and the other tradition is oppression (Bookchin vs. anarcho-capitalists) or a combination thereof (Black). These contemporary distinctions trace to the time of early modern anarchism when Peter Kropotkin and Alexander Berkman either broke with groups or otherwise separated the traditions of communist anarchism from individualist, mutualist, and egoist anarchism. Even the very idea of the individualist–socialist divide is contested, as some types of individualist anarchism are largely socialistic. Despite these imprecise boundaries and some similarities, socialism and individualism within anarchism have a bifurcated tradition, the former associated with the history of socialism and the latter with classical liberalism and conservatism (also known as "right-libertarianism"). Even their shared belief in anti-statism does not provide a common identity, as both traditions differ in their interpretation of state-rejection in spite of the common terms.

== Relation with property and capitalism ==
Modern American libertarians are distinguished from the dominant libertarian tradition by their relation to property and capital. While both historical libertarianism and contemporary economic libertarianism share general antipathy towards the government, contemporary libertarianism favors free market capitalism, while historical libertarianism does not. Historically, libertarians including Herbert Spencer and Max Stirner supported the protection of an individual's freedom from powers of government and private ownership. In contrast, modern American libertarians support freedoms on the basis of their agreement with private property rights. The abolishment of public amenities is a common theme in modern American libertarian writings.

Forms of libertarianism that put laissez-faire economics before economic equality are viewed by most anarchists as incompatible with anarchism's general tradition of egalitarianism and anti-capitalism. (Note: Marshall 1992, pp. 564–565: "Anarcho-capitalists are against the State simply because they are capitalists first and foremost. ... They are not concerned with the social consequences of capitalism for the weak, powerless and ignorant. ... As such, anarcho-capitalism overlooks the egalitarian implications of traditional individualist anarchists like Spooner and Tucker. In fact, few anarchists would accept the 'anarcho-capitalists' into the anarchist camp since they do not share a concern for economic equality and social justice. Their self-interested, calculating market men would be incapable of practising voluntary co-operation and mutual aid. Anarcho-capitalists, even if they do reject the state, might therefore best be called right-wing libertarians rather than anarchists."; Jennings 1993, p. 143: "... anarchism does not stand for the untrammelled freedom of the individual (as the 'anarcho-capitalists' appear to believe) but, as we have already seen, for the extension of individuality and community."; Gay & Gay 1999, p. 15: "For many anarchists (of whatever persuasion), anarcho-capitalism is a contradictory term, since 'traditional' anarchists oppose capitalism"; Morriss 2008, p. 13: "Social anarchists, those anarchists with communitarian leanings, are critical of anarcho-capitalism because it permits individuals to accumulate substantial power through markets and private property."; Franks 2013, pp. 393–394: "Individualisms that defend or reinforce hierarchical forms such as the economic-power relations of anarcho-capitalism ... are incompatible with practices of social anarchism ... Increasingly, academic analysis has followed activist currents in rejecting the view that anarcho-capitalism has anything to do with social anarchism.") Anarcho-capitalism, which would abolish the state and create a fully laissez-faire economy, lies outside of traditional forms of anarchism, such as social anarchism. It shares anarchism's antipathy towards the state but not anarchism's antipathy towards hierarchy, as theorists expect from anarcho-capitalist economic power relations. The ideology follows a different paradigm from most forms of anarchism and has a fundamentally different approach and goals. Despite the "anarcho" in its title, some scholars consider anarcho-capitalism to be more closely affiliated with capitalism and right-wing libertarianism, than with anarchism. Further, within laissez-faire libertarianism, some reject the designation "anarcho-capitalism", believing that "capitalism" may either refer to the laissez-faire market they support or the government-regulated system that they oppose.

== Types of definition of anarchism ==
Anarchism scholar Paul McLaughlin studies the various definitions of anarchism in his book Anarchism and Authority. According to him, there are three common types of anarchism definition:

- etymological definitions
- anti-statist definitions
- anti-authoritarian definitions

But all fall short from providing a precise definition of anarchism.

=== Etymological definition ===
"Anarchy" derives from the Greek anarkhos, meaning "without authority" (as opposed to "without government/state"). Hence the etymological definition of anarchism as the negation of an authority. But anarchism is generally not simply a negative stance on authority but also a positive stance about how society should be structured.

=== Anti-statist definition ===
Anti-statist definitions place the focus of interest on the negation, and confrontation in the real world, of the state by anarchism. But as with the etymological definition, anarchism is much more than anti-statism, as it generally rejects all forms of established authority.

The association between anti-statism and anarchism is both commonly understood and contested. (Note: Jun 2009, p. 507: "One common misconception, which has been rehearsed repeatedly by the few Anglo-American philosophers who have bothered to broach the topic ... is that anarchism can be defined solely in terms of opposition to states and governments."; Franks 2013, pp. 386–387: "... many, questionably, regard anti-statism as the irremovable, universal principle at the core of anarchism"; Franks 2013, p. 388: "The fact that [socialist and individualist anarchisms] share a core concept of 'anti-statism', which is often advanced as ... a commonality between them ..., is insufficient to produce a shared identity ... because [they interpret] the concept of state-rejection ... differently despite the initial similarity in nomenclature."; McLaughlin 2007, p. 166: "[opposition to the state] is (contrary to what many scholars believe) not definitive of anarchism")

Anarchism, according to historian Peter Marshall, exists outside standards of political theory because its aims are not based on the struggle for power within the state. It is more concerned with moral and economic theory than participation in political systems and indeed often advocates against participation in such systems.

Anarchist libertarians and modern economic libertarians share opposition to the state as their only significant commonality.

=== Anti-authoritarian definitions ===
Anti-authoritarian definitions depicts the rejection of all kinds of authorities. Even though these kind of definitions are much broader than the anti-statist ones, there are still handicaps. McLaughlin, who examines under a philosophical scope, claims that anti-authoritarianism is a conclusion of anarchist thought, not an a priori statement, therefore it can not be used as a definition.

== See also ==
- Definition of fascism
- Definition of terrorism
- Floating signifier
- Libertaire and Libertario

== Bibliography ==
- Amster, Randall; DeLeon, Abraham; Fernandez, Luis; Nocera, Anthony J.; Shannon, Deric, eds. (2009). Contemporary Anarchist Studies: An Introductory Anthology of Anarchy in the Academy. New York: Routledge. ISBN 978-0-415-47402-3.
- Callahan, Kevin J.; Curtis, Sarah A., eds. (2009). Views from the Margins: Creating Identities in Modern France. University of Nebraska Press. ISBN 978-0-8032-1559-7.
- Chomsky, Noam (2005). Pateman, Barry (ed.). Chomsky on Anarchism. Oakland, CA: AK Press. ISBN 978-1-904859-26-0.
- Cohn, Jesse (2009). "Anarchism". In Ness, Immanuel (ed.). The International Encyclopedia of Revolution and Protest. Oxford, UK: John Wiley & Sons, Ltd. pp. 1–11. doi:10.1002/9781405198073.wbierp0039. ISBN 978-1-4051-9807-3.
- Cornell, Andrew (2016). Unruly Equality: U.S. Anarchism in the Twentieth Century. Oakland: University of California Press. ISBN 978-0-520-28675-7.
- Davis, Laurence (2019). "Individual and Community". In Levy, Carl; Adams, Matthew S. (eds.). The Palgrave Handbook of Anarchism. Cham: Springer. pp. 47–70. doi:10.1007/978-3-319-75620-2_3. ISBN 978-3-319-75619-6. S2CID 150149495.
- Doherty, Brian (2008). Radicals for Capitalism: A Freewheeling History of the Modern American Libertarian Movement. PublicAffairs. ISBN 978-1-58648-572-6.
- Evren, Süreyyya (2011). "How New Anarchism Changed the World (of Opposition) after Seattle and Gave Birth to Post-Anarchism". In Rousselle, Duane; Evren, Süreyyya (eds.). Post-Anarchism: A Reader. Pluto Press. pp. 1–19. ISBN 978-0-7453-3086-0.
- Francis, Mark (December 1983). "Human Rights and Libertarians". Australian Journal of Politics & History. 29 (3): 462–472. doi:10.1111/j.1467-8497.1983.tb00212.x. ISSN 0004-9522.
- Franks, Benjamin (August 2013). Freeden, Michael; Stears, Marc (eds.). "Anarchism". The Oxford Handbook of Political Ideologies. Oxford University Press: 385–404. doi:10.1093/oxfordhb/9780199585977.013.0001. ISBN 978-0-19-958597-7.
- Gamble, Andrew (August 2013). Freeden, Michael; Stears, Marc (eds.). "Economic Libertarianism". The Oxford Handbook of Political Ideologies. Oxford University Press: 405–421. doi:10.1093/oxfordhb/9780199585977.013.0008. ISBN 978-0-19-958597-7.
- Gay, Kathlyn; Gay, Martin (1999). Encyclopedia of Political Anarchy. ABC-CLIO. ISBN 978-0-87436-982-3.
- Graham, Robert (2015). We Do Not Fear Anarchy, We Invoke It: The First International and the Origins of the Anarchist Movement. AK Press. ISBN 978-1-84935-211-6.
- Jennings, Jeremy (1993). "Anarchism". In Eatwell, Roger; Wright, Anthony (eds.). Contemporary Political Ideologies. London: Pinter. pp. 127–146. ISBN 978-0-86187-096-7.
- Johnson, Charles (2008). "Liberty, Equality, Solidarity Toward a Dialectical Anarchism". In Long, Roderick T.; Machan, Tibor R. (eds.). Anarchism/Minarchism: Is a Government Part of a Free Country?. pp. 155–188. ISBN 978-0-7546-6066-8.
- Jun, Nathan (September 2009). "Anarchist Philosophy and Working Class Struggle: A Brief History and Commentary". WorkingUSA. 12 (3): 505–519. doi:10.1111/j.1743-4580.2009.00251.x. ISSN 1089-7011.
- Kemp, Michael (2018). "Beneath a White Tower". Bombs, Bullets and Bread: The Politics of Anarchist Terrorism Worldwide, 1866–1926. Jefferson, North Carolina: McFarland. pp. 178–186. ISBN 978-1-4766-7101-7.
- Levy, Carl; Adams, Matthew S., eds. (2018). The Palgrave Handbook of Anarchism. Palgrave Macmillan. doi:10.1007/978-3-319-75620-2. ISBN 978-3-319-75619-6. S2CID 149333615.
- Long, Roderick T.; Machan, Tibor R., eds. (2008). Anarchism/Minarchism: Is a Government Part of a Free Country?. Ashgate. ISBN 978-0-7546-6066-8.
- Marshall, Peter (1992). Demanding the Impossible: A History of Anarchism. London: HarperCollins. ISBN 978-0-00-217855-6.
- McLaughlin, Paul (2007). "Defining Anarchism". Anarchism and Authority: A Philosophical Introduction to Classical Anarchism. Ashgate. pp. 25–36. ISBN 978-0-7546-6196-2.
- Miller, David (1984). "What Is Anarchism?". Anarchism. London: J.M. Dent & Sons. ISBN 0-460-10093-9.
- Morriss, Andrew (2008). "Anarcho-capitalism". In Hamowy, Ronald (ed.). The Encyclopedia of Libertarianism. Sage; Cato Institute. pp. 13–14. doi:10.4135/9781412965811.n8. ISBN 978-1-4129-6580-4. OCLC 191924853.
- Williams, Dana M. (June 2018). "Contemporary anarchist and anarchistic movements". Sociology Compass. 12 (6) e12582. doi:10.1111/soc4.12582. ISSN 1751-9020.
- Woodcock, George (1980). "Anarchist Phases and Personalities". Queen's Quarterly. 87 (1): 82–96. ISSN 0033-6041. ProQuest 1296885359.
