= Anarchy (disambiguation) =

Anarchy is the state of a society being without authorities or a governing body.

Anarchy may also refer to:

== General ==
- Anarchism, the belief that the state and all forms of rulership are undesirable and should be abolished
- Anarchy in international relations, posits that there is no universal sovereign or worldwide government
- Lawlessness, the feared result of anarchism

== Historical periods ==
- Anarchy at Samarra, period of civil war and fragmentation in the Abbasid Caliphate (861–870)
- Anarchy of the 12 Warlords, period of civil war in Vietnam (944–968)
- Military Anarchy, period of civil war and military coups in the Roman Empire (235–284)
- The Anarchy, the period of civil war and unsettled government in England during the reign (1135–1154) of King Stephen
- Twenty Years' Anarchy, the period of extreme instability and several short-lived emperors in the Byzantine Empire (695–717)

== Comics ==
- Anarchy Comics, a series of underground comics published between 1978 and 1987
- Anarchy, the fifth trade paperback volume of the Powers comic book series, published by Image Comics

== Films ==
- Cymbeline (film), or Anarchy, a 2014 film based on Shakespeare's Cymbeline
- Anarchy (1989 film), a Soviet drama film

== Music ==
- Anarchy (Busta Rhymes album), 2000
- Anarchy (Chumbawamba album), 1994
- Anarchy (Neon Hitch album), 2016
- Anarchy (Shiritsu Ebisu Chugaku album), 2016
- "Anarchy" (song), a 1997 song by KMFDM

== Other arts and media ==
- Anarchy (video game), a 1990 shooter video game
- Anarchy Online, a 2001 science fiction MMORPG game
- The Anarchy: The Relentless Rise of the East India Company, a 2019 book by William Dalrymple
- Anarchy (essay) (L'anarchia), Errico Malatesta's 1891 pamphlet explaining his version of anarchism
- Anarchy (magazine), a London anarchist magazine from the 1960s
- Anarchy: A Journal of Desire Armed, a North American anarchist magazine

== See also ==
- Anarchist (disambiguation)
- Anarchism (disambiguation)
- Anarky (disambiguation)
- Anomie, a social condition characterized by an absence or diminution of standards or values
- Chaos (disambiguation), unpredictability, the antithetical concept of cosmos
- Relationship anarchy, the application of anarchist principles to intimate relationships
