= Zofia Stemplowska =

British professor of political theory

Zofia Stemplowska is a Polish-British Professor of Political Theory at the University of Oxford's Department of Politics and International Relations. She is an Asa Briggs Fellow at Worcester College, and the Director of the Centre for the Study of Social Justice. Further, she is an editor for the journal Philosophy and Public Affairs. Stemplowska was Associate Professor of Political Theory at Warwick University until 2012. She has also been a Lecturer in Political Theory at the University of Reading, and a Lecturer in Political Philosophy at University of Manchester and a Barbara McCoy Postdoctoral Fellow at Stanford University.

Stemplowska studied for her BA, MPhil, and PhD at the University of Oxford under the supervision of professor David Miller. Her dissertation concerned the role of luck egalitarianism in liberal political philosophy. Stemplowska has since written widely on liberal theory and justice. She has provided a robust theory for ideal theory and non-ideal theory. Ideal theory aims at providing standards for justice, toward which a society can strive; Stemplowska argues that this form of political theory is important alongside other forms of theory, even though it cannot be applied directly in the world as it is.

Stemplowska's public writing has appeared in The Times Literary Supplement and The Guardian, and has been praised by the BBC.
