= Anarchist (disambiguation) =

An anarchist is an adherent of the philosophy of anarchism.

Anarchist(s) or The Anarchist(s) may also refer to:

== Literature ==
- The Anarchist (newspaper), a monthly newspaper produced in London, England between 1885 and 1888
- Die Anarchisten, an 1891 semi-fictional book by John Henry Mackay
- The Anarchists (book), a 1964 history of anarchism by James Joll
- The Anarchist (play), a two-person 2012 play by David Mamet
- Anarchist (comics), a Marvel Comics character

== Film and television ==
- Anarchists (film), a 2000 action film
- Les Anarchistes (English: The Anarchists), a 2015 French film
- The Anarchists, a 2022 television series produced by Blumhouse Productions

== Music ==
- "The Anarchists", a 1968 song by Léo Ferré

== See also ==
- Anarchism (disambiguation)
- Anarchy (disambiguation)
