= Anarky (disambiguation) =

Anarky is a fictional character in the DC Universe.

Anarky may also refer to:

- Anarky (Arrowverse), a fictional character in the television series Arrow
- Anarky (comic book), a short-lived comic book series
- Batman: Anarky, a 1999 trade paperback

== See also ==
- Anarchy (disambiguation)
