= StarRay =

1988 video game

- Developer: Hidden Treasures
- Publisher: Logotron
- Platforms: Amiga, Atari ST, Commodore 64
- Release: 1988
- Genre: Scrolling shooter
- Mode: Single-player

StarRay is a scrolling shooter video game developed by Hidden Treasures and published by Logotron in 1988. Released for the Amiga, Atari ST, and Commodore 64, StarRay is based on the 1981 arcade game Defender, with faster gameplay and more detailed graphics and sound. The game was published in 1989 by Epyx as Revenge of Defender for the American market.

In 1991, the Amiga and Atari ST versions were re-issued in the UK on Prism Leisure's "16-Bit Pocket Power" imprint.
