= Defender (2002 video game) =

2002 video game

- North American box art
- Developers: 7 Studios (PS2); Inevitable Entertainment (GC, Xbox); Outlook Entertainment (GBA); Lavastorm (Mobile); Digital Eclipse (Xbox 360)
- Publishers: Midway; THQ (Mobile)
- Director: George Collins
- Producers: Matthew Candler; Christine Thomas
- Designers: Robert Berger; Richard Bisso; Jeffery Gardiner; Michael Kirkbride
- Programmer: Brian Hawkins
- Artist: Miguel Lleras
- Writers: Robert Berger; Michael Kirkbride; Margaret Stohl
- Composer: Michael Cohen
- Platforms: PlayStation 2, Xbox, GameCube, Game Boy Advance, mobile, Xbox 360
- Release: NA: 21 October 2002 (PS2); NA: 4 November 2002 (GC, Xbox); NA: 7 November 2002 (GBA); EU: 24 March 2003; Mobile; 13 June 2003; Xbox 360; 15 November 2006
- Genre: Shoot 'em up

Defender (subtitled For All Mankind outside North America) is a shoot 'em up video game developed in October 2002 for the PlayStation 2, and Xbox, and was ported to the GameCube the following month, followed by a port to the mobile phone version published by THQ in 2003. The game was also rereleased for Xbox 360's Live Arcade in November 2006. It is a remake of the 1981 game of the same name. Featuring three-dimensional (3D) graphics, the game is set on multiple planets and moons within the Solar System where the player must defeat waves of invading aliens while protecting astronauts.

A separate version of the game was released for the Game Boy Advance. Despite sharing a name, box art and a release date with the console versions, it is a different game.

== Gameplay ==
The player picks up humans, who are in danger from aliens, and brings them to a drop zone for extraction. The enemy landers are attacking them, and will constantly try to pick them up for themselves. Once a human is stolen, the player has a short amount of time to blast the lander and catch the slowly falling human. If the player fails to free the human, they are absorbed into the lander and the lander is transformed into a much more difficult enemy. If the human hits the ground from falling they will die. The enemies are a handful of other alien craft, including some ground units that can turn humans into zombies.

== Game Boy Advance version ==
A separate version of the game was released for the Game Boy Advance. It contains a faithful recreation of the 1981 Defender, and an updated version with digitized sprites and new game modes.

== Reception ==
Reception

Aggregate scores
Aggregator	Score					
Aggregator	GBA	GameCube	mobile	PS2	Xbox	Xbox 360
GameRankings	36%	68%	53%	74%	66%	57%
Metacritic	37/100	66/100	N/A	73/100	69/100	58/100

Review scores
Publication	Score					
Publication	GBA	GameCube	mobile	PS2	Xbox	Xbox 360
AllGame	2/5	N/A	N/A	N/A	N/A	N/A
Electronic Gaming Monthly	N/A	N/A	N/A	6.5/10	N/A	N/A
Eurogamer	N/A	N/A	N/A	6/10	N/A	6/10
Game Informer	2/10	N/A	N/A	7.75/10	8.25/10	N/A
GamePro	N/A	N/A	N/A	4/5	N/A	N/A
GameSpot	4.9/10	6.9/10	N/A	6.9/10	6.9/10	6.6/10
GameZone	5.5/10	7.8/10	N/A	8/10	6/10	N/A
IGN	2/10	7/10	2/10	7.5/10	7.1/10	5.5/10
Nintendo Power	3/5	3.1/5	N/A	N/A	N/A	N/A
Nintendo World Report	N/A	6/10	N/A	N/A	N/A	N/A
Official U.S. PlayStation Magazine	N/A	N/A	N/A	3.5/5	N/A	N/A
Official Xbox Magazine (US)	N/A	N/A	N/A	N/A	8/10	6.5/10
X-Play	N/A	N/A	N/A	4/5	N/A	N/A

The game received "mixed or average reviews" on all platforms except the Game Boy Advance version, which received "unfavorable" reviews, according to the review aggregation website Metacritic.
