= Anarchy (video game) =

1990 video game

- Developer: WJS Design
- Publisher: Psygnosis
- Designer: Chris Sorrell
- Platforms: Amiga, Atari ST
- Release: 1990
- Genre: Scrolling shooter
- Mode: Single-player

Anarchy is a horizontally-scrolling shooter similar to Defender, released in 1990 for the Amiga and Atari ST. The game's working title was "It Can't Be Done", as the code began as Wayne Smithson's attempt at proving that the Atari ST could handle smooth horizontal scrolling despite its lack of dedicated hardware for this task - a number of compromises were taken in order to achieve this <https://codetapper.com/atari-st/st-games/st-anarchy/>.
