= Anarchism (Ritter book) =

1980 book by Alan Ritter

- 2010 edition
- Author: Alan Ritter
- Subject: Political theory
- Publisher: Cambridge University Press
- Publication date: 1980
- Pages: 187
- ISBN: 9780521233248

Anarchism: A Theoretical Analysis is a 1980 book about anarchism as a political theory written by Alan Ritter.
