= David Miller (political theorist) =

English political theorist

David Miller FBA
- Born: David Leslie Miller; 8 March 1946 (age 80)

Academic background
- Education: Selwyn College, Cambridge; Balliol College, Oxford
- Thesis: Social Justice (1974)

Academic work
- Discipline: Political studies
- Sub-discipline: Political theory
- Institutions: University of Lancaster; University of East Anglia; Nuffield College, Oxford
- Doctoral students: Daniel A. Bell, Zofia Stemplowska, Clare Chambers
- Main interests: Justice; nationality; market socialism
- Notable works: Strangers in Our Midst (2016); On Nationality (1995)

David Leslie Miller FBA (born 8 March 1946) is an English political theorist. He is Professor of Political Theory at the University of Oxford and an Official Fellow of Nuffield College, Oxford. He previously lectured at the University of Lancaster and the University of East Anglia. He received his Bachelor of Arts degree from the University of Cambridge, and his Bachelor of Philosophy and Doctor of Philosophy degrees from the University of Oxford. Previous works include Social Justice, On Nationality and Citizenship and National Identity. Miller is known for his support of a modest form of liberal nationalism.

== Contribution ==
In Principles of Social Justice Miller proposes a pluralist account of social justice, arguing that there can be no single measure of justice.

He claims that 'social justice' (defined as the 'just' distribution of benefits and burdens within society) can only be defined in reference to our 'considered judgements'. That is, philosophy must come from lived experience and empirical evidence. This is what leads him to argue for multiple sources of justice as in his opinion people believe in a range of rationales for justice.

Miller states that the most 'just' distribution depends on the type of relationship between the people involved. In 'solidaristic communities,' where people identify themselves as holding a shared culture or belief, distributions should be made in accordance with need (e.g. family or church group). In 'instrumental associations', where people are acting together with a common purpose but each for their own good (and not necessarily sharing a common identity or 'conception of the good'), justice is best served by allocating by desert (e.g. in the workplace). Contributions should be recognised with proportionate rewards. In 'citizenship', where people are related through political and legal structures, equality should prevail (e.g. in countries). His definition of equality involves equal status for members by the allocation of equal civil, political and social rights. Equal social rights entails the equal ability to make use of the political and civil rights, and therefore demands a welfare state and some redistribution of wealth.

In On Nationality and Citizenship and National Identity Miller defends a moderate, liberal form of nationalism, which he views as an important factor in maintaining support for welfare states (including institutions such as the British National Health Service). The nation state, he argues, performs the role of replicating the social solidarity found in local communities at the level of states in which populations are largely anonymous. He argues that we have greater ethical duties to our co-nationals than nationals of other states: "nations are ethical communities ... The duties we owe to our fellow-nationals are different from, and more extensive than, the duties we owe to humans as such".

== Criticisms ==
Miller's work has been subject to numerous criticisms and replies, for instance a special issue of the journal Critical Review of International Social and Political Philosophy on 'Nationalism and Global Justice – David Miller and His Critics' (Vol. 11, no. 4).

Miller's support for liberal forms of nationalism has been criticised by theorists such as Iris Marion Young, who stresses the need to develop forms of solidarity that extend beyond the state. It can be argued that Miller's assertion that we have greater ethical obligations to our co-nationals than to nationals of other states relies on an assumption that all states are equally well placed to provide for their citizens' needs, and defend their rights. Critics point out that this does not correspond to empirical reality. Young gives the example of natural resources, which are unequally distributed between states. She argues that their placement is morally arbitrary.

== Selected publications ==
- Social Justice. 1976.
- Philosophy and Ideology in Hume's Political Thought, 1981
- Anarchism, 1984, ISBN 0-460-10093-9
- Market, State, and Community: Theoretical Foundations of Market Socialism, 1989
- On Nationality, Oxford, 1995
- Principles of Social Justice, Harvard, 1999
- Citizenship and National Identity, Polity, 2000
- Political Philosophy: A Very Short Introduction, Oxford, 2003
- National Responsibility and Global Justice, Oxford, 2007
- Justice for Earthlings: Essays in Political Philosophy, Oxford, 2013
- Strangers in Our Midst: The Political Philosophy of Immigration, Harvard, 2016
