= Defender (video game) =

1981 video game

- Flyer showing the title screen on the upright arcade cabinet. At the bottom are the joystick and buttons.
- Developer: Williams Electronics
- Publishers: Arcade: NA/EU: Williams Electronics; JP: Taito; Ports; Atari, Inc. Atarisoft
- Designers: Eugene Jarvis; Larry DeMar
- Programmers: Eugene Jarvis; Larry DeMar; Sam Dicker; Paul Dussault
- Series: Defender
- Platform: Arcade: Atari 2600, Atari 5200, Atari 8-bit, Adventure Vision, VIC-20, ColecoVision, TI-99/4A, Intellivision, Apple II, Commodore 64, IBM PC, Game Boy, Xbox 360, Mobile phone
- Release: February 1981: Arcade; JP: February 1981; NA: March 1981; EU: Late 1981 2600; June 1982 5200; December 1982 VIC-20; October 1983 TI-99/4A; November 1983 ColecoVision; December 1983 Game Boy; NA: October 1995; EU: 1995
- Genre: Scrolling shooter
- Modes: Single-player, multiplayer

Defender is a horizontally scrolling shooter video game developed and published by Williams Electronics for arcades in 1981. Set on a mountainous planet, the player pilots a space ship to defeat waves invading aliens that vary in appearance and behavior. While attacking enemies, the player must protect and rescue astronauts on the surface from aliens.

A pinball developer at the time, Williams aimed to expand into video games and selected Eugene Jarvis to lead development. The development team initially focused on designing the game's arcade hardware, aiming to portray Williams as a technologically advanced developer. When creating early prototypes, Jarvis drew inspiration from Space Invaders and Asteroids. He progressively added offensive and defensive action to the game design, which culminated in gameplay that was more complex and challenging than contemporary video games.

Defender debuted at trade shows in late 1980 before releasing to arcades in March 1981. Williams licensed it to local video game companies in Japan and the United Kingdom when exporting overseas, eventually selling 70,000 units worldwide. The company registered copyrights and trademarks related to Defender, which it used to litigate companies that produced unauthorized clones and copies. Ports were developed for contemporary game systems by either Atari, Inc. or its software label for non-Atari platforms, Atarisoft. Midway Games handled many of the later ports and re-releases. Defender was followed by sequels and remade in different formats.

The game was commercially successful, becoming one of the highest-grossing arcade games. It quickly increased Williams net income and eventually earned the company US$1 billion. Defender's challenging gameplay and complex control scheme were frequently discussed in contemporary commentary. The ports met with varying degrees of mixed reception. The 1982 Atari 2600 version was one of the best-selling games for the system, selling over 3 million cartridges. Retrospective reviews frequently rank Defender among the top video games, citing its innovative and challenging gameplay. It is often listed as one of Jarvis's best contributions and cited as the inspiration for other games as well as several songs.

== Gameplay ==
The player flies the spaceship (upper right) above the planet surface to protect humans from the Lander enemies. The top of the screen displays game statistics and a mini-map, which shows the entire world.

Defender is a side-scrolling shooter set on the mountainous surface of an unnamed planet. The game tasks the player with piloting a space ship to attack invading enemies; a second player can take turns with the first player in the two-player mode. The player controls the space ship with a two-way joystick, which adjusts the ship's elevation, and five buttons that activate weapons and special maneuvers. The ship's two weapons are a forward-facing laser that can be fired continually and a supply of three smart bombs. Buttons are available for the player to change the ship's direction, provide it with a burst of speed, and use hyperspace to randomly transport it elsewhere in the game world. Hyperspace can be activated repeatedly, but it can result in the ship being teleported into a dangerous situation that results in destruction.

The player must destroy all alien invaders while protecting ten astronauts on the landscape from abduction. Defeating the aliens allows the player to progress to the next level. Landers capture humans and attempt to carry them to the top of the screen at which point they turn into fast-moving mutants. Mutants track the player's ship, firing projectiles at it. A captured human can be freed by shooting the lander, then catching the human before it falls to its death, and dropping it off on the ground. Additional enemies—baiters, bombers, pods, and swarmers—appear after the first stage. Baiters are fast moving discs that will shoot at or crash into the player ship. Bombers continually desposit floating mines throughout the playfield. Pods are slow moving objects that burst into a group of swarmers when shot. Swarmers, like baiters, home in on the player ship while shooting at it.

Failing to protect the astronauts causes the planet to explode and mutants to swarm the level. Surviving the waves of mutants restores the planet. A ship is lost if it is hit by an enemy or its projectiles. The game ends after exhausting the available ships. As the game world is larger than what the screen displays, a scanner at the top of the screen displays a miniature representation of the landscape along with the locations of humans and enemies. A set of brackets on the map indicate the portion of the game world that the player is currently viewing.

== Development ==
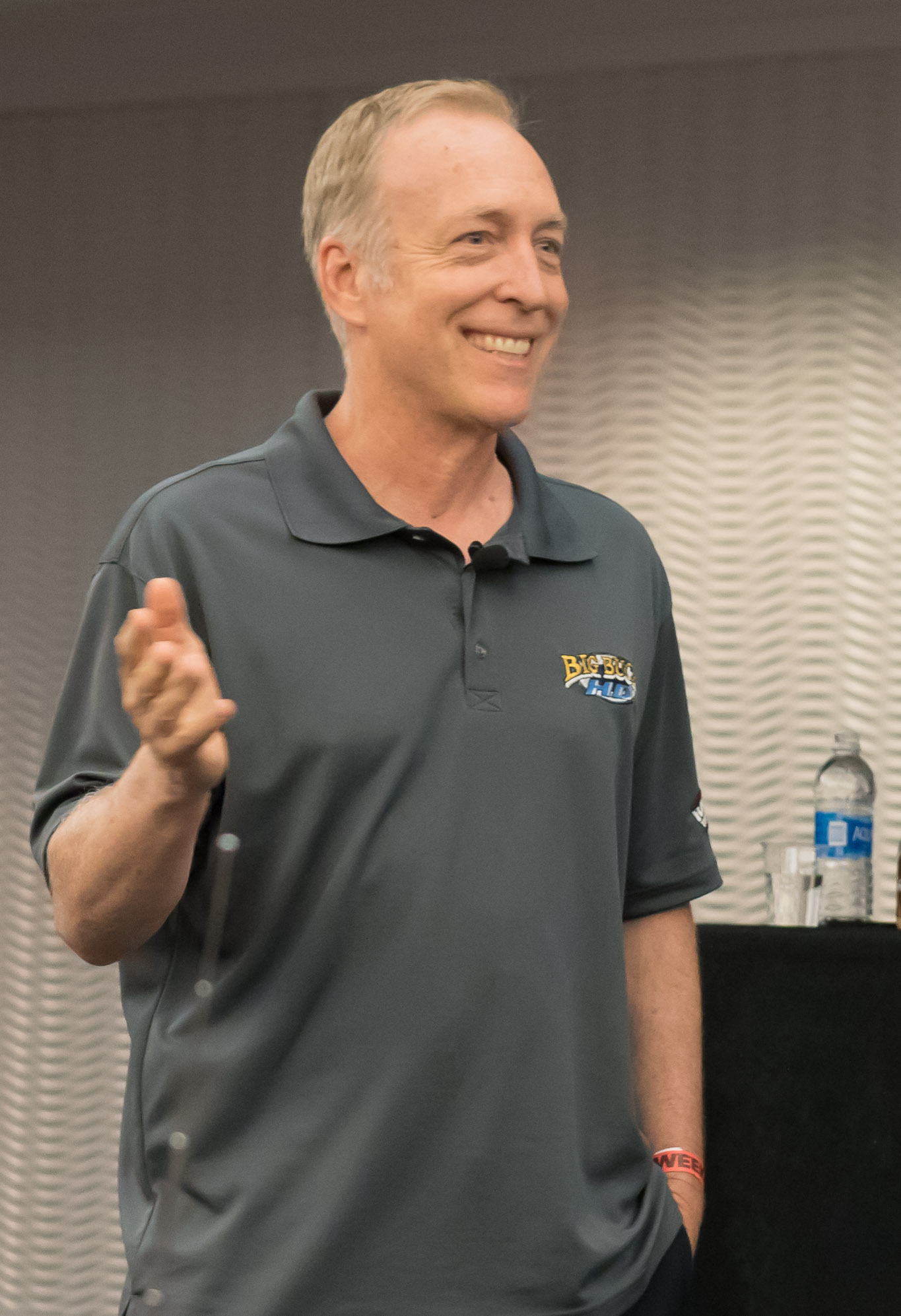
Eugene Jarvis (shown in 2016)

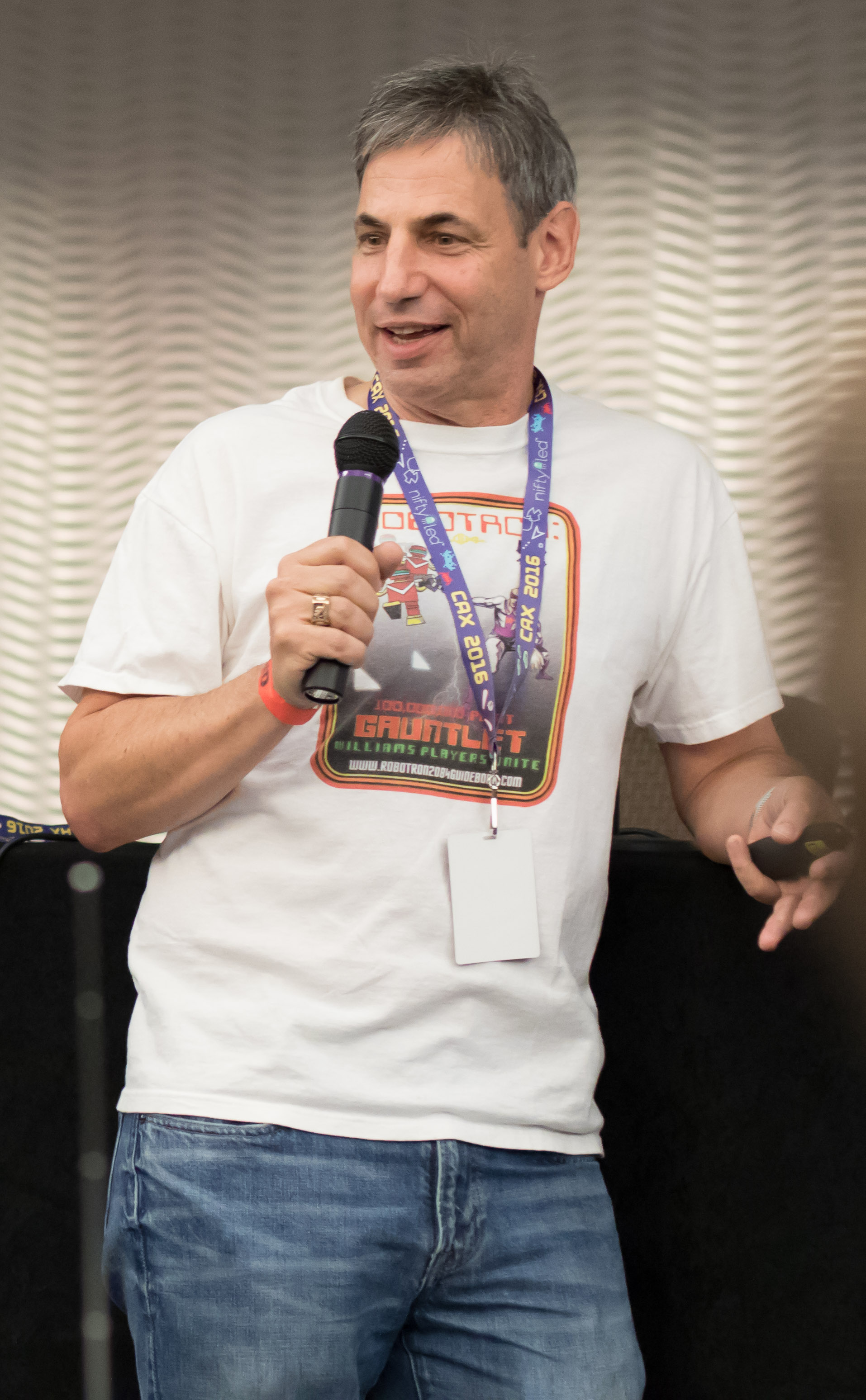
Larry DeMar (shown in 2016)

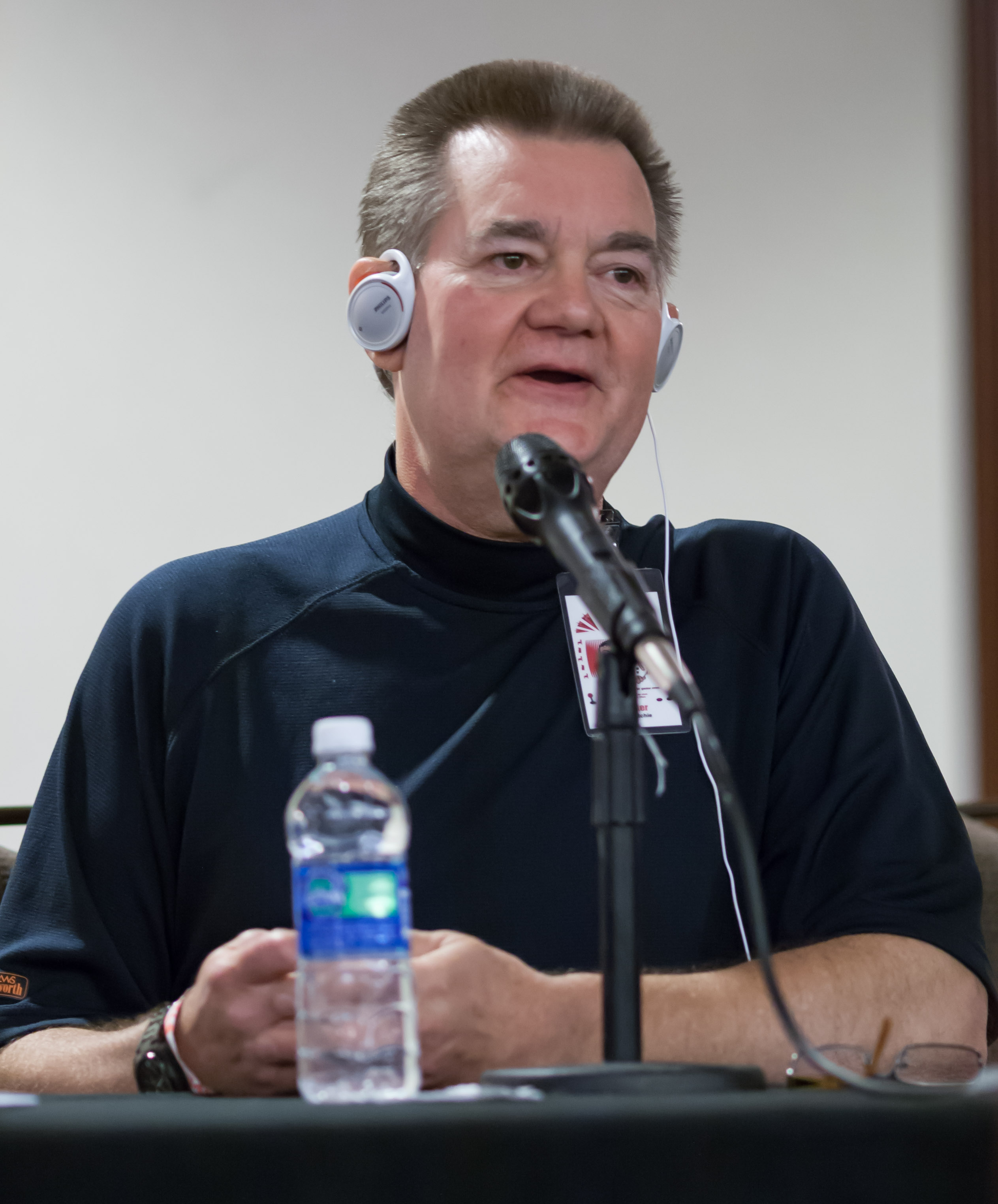
Steve Ritchie (shown in 2009)

The development team included Eugene Jarvis, who led the effort, and Larry DeMar. Steve Ritchie advised on the project.

Defender was Williams Electronics' first attempt at developing an original video game; the company's earlier game was a Pong clone. The popularity of coin-operated video games in 1979 spurred it to expand beyond pinball games. The company chose Eugene Jarvis, who had a successful record of Williams pinball games, to head development. Additionally, the release of Taito's Space Invaders in 1978 inspired Jarvis to pursue arcade game development. Larry DeMar, Sam Dicker, and Paul Dussault assisted Jarvis.

Development began around October 1979. The team first determined the specifications of the game's hardware. They aimed to portray Williams games as technologically advanced and included more capabilities than the game required. At the time, Williams had a small staff, and its management was unfamiliar with the technology used for its electronic games. As a result, the developers were afforded a large amount of creative freedom. They used a Motorola EXORciser computer to develop the game's program.

=== Early designs and conception ===
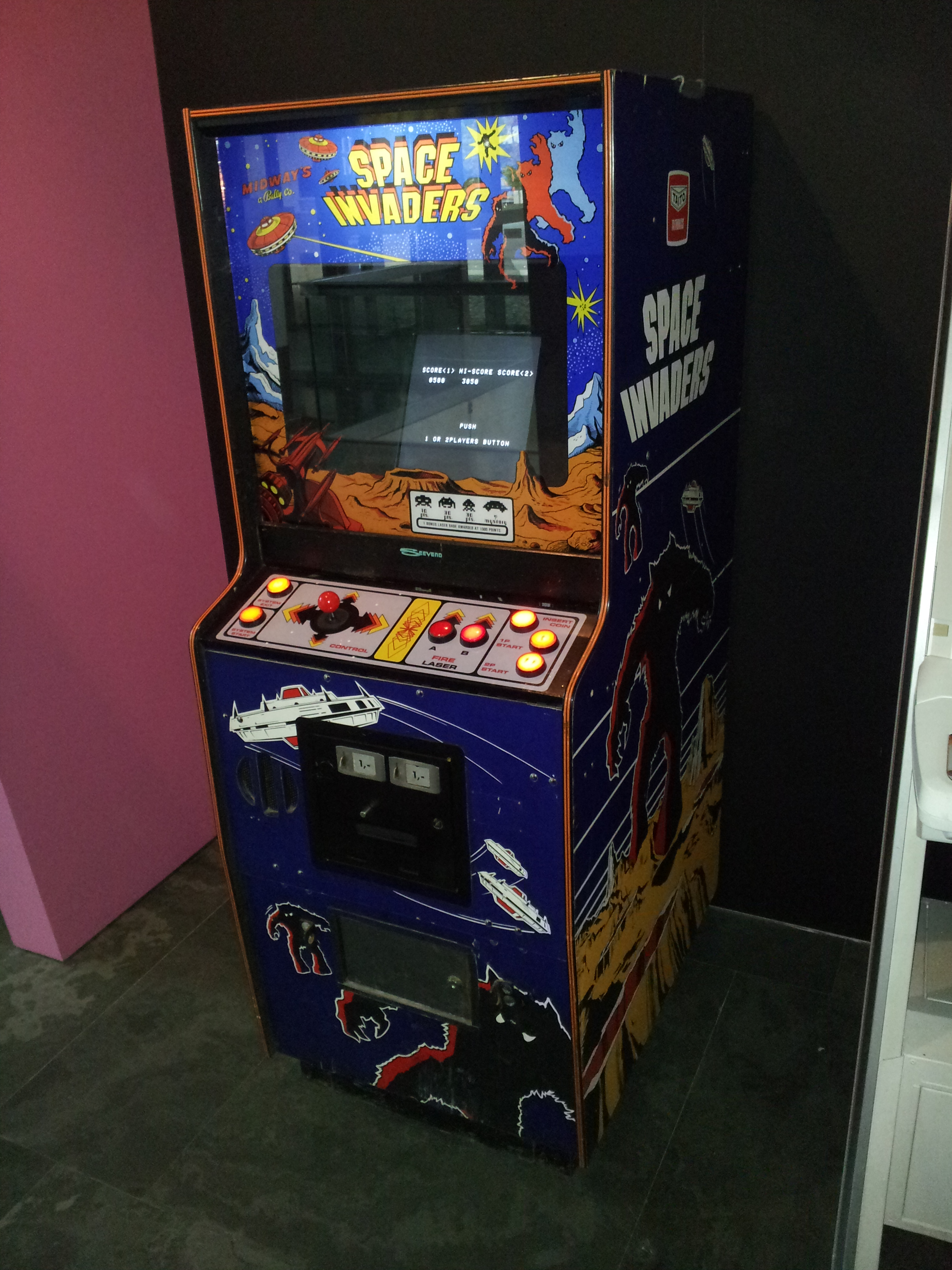
Space Invaders, 1978

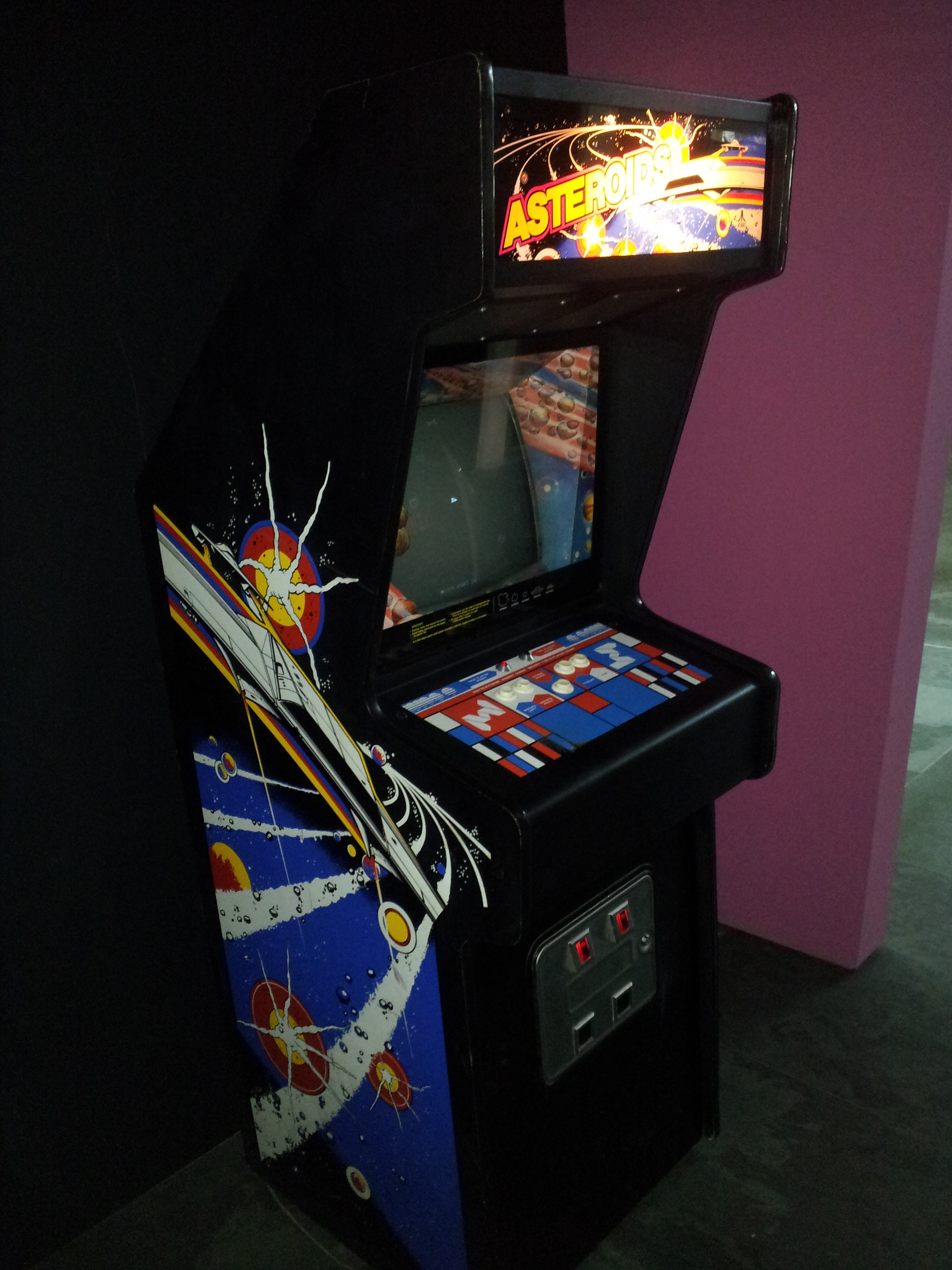
Asteroids, 1979

Early prototypes were based on popular space shooters, Space Invaders and Asteroids, released a few years earlier.

Initially, Jarvis spent three to four months developing color variations of Space Invaders and Atari, Inc.'s Asteroids. Space was a popular setting for video games at the time, and Jarvis felt the abstract setting would help obscure simple graphics. First inspired by Space Invaders, he created a prototype with similar gameplay that included new mechanics. After spending a few weeks with the design, however, the team felt it was dull and abandoned the idea. Development then shifted to emulating Asteroids, which displays vector graphics on a special monitor, and the team experimented with recreating the game with pixel graphics. They abandoned this design as well, deeming it a poor recreation and visually unappealing.

Believing the first attempts to be too derivative, the developers held brainstorming sessions. During a session, they agreed that one of Asteroids's favorable elements was its wraparound screen effect. They felt that allowing the player to fly a ship off the screen would be exciting and decided to create a game world larger than the screen displayed. The game's environment was made wider than the screen and scrolled horizontally. Expanding on the idea, they envisioned Space Invaders' design rotated 90 degrees to have the ship move up and down while flying horizontally. Large asteroids, an element from Asteroids, were added to the game world but later removed. Jarvis intended the screen to scroll only from left to right; fellow Williams employee Steve Ritchie, however, convinced him the game should be able to scroll in either direction.

I had this whole justification for why you were there and what you were doing. A lot of games fall short. They just put you there, and all of a sudden, you're beating people up and you start to wonder. "Why am I beating these people up?" There was actually an old TV show called The Defenders about attorneys back in the 1960s, and I kind of liked that show. You know, if you're defending something, you're being attacked, and you can do whatever you wanted.

— Eugene Jarvis on the premise and name of Defender

After six months of development, the team considered the progress insufficient. They examined other games and concluded that survival was a necessary component. The team devised enemies to present a threat, the first of which was the "Lander". Jarvis enjoyed violent, action entertainment, and he wanted to include those elements but felt the action should have a reasonable objective. Inspired by the 1960s television show The Defenders, Jarvis titled the game Defender, reasoning that the title helped justify the violence. He added astronauts to expand on the space theme and give the player something to defend while shooting enemies. Jarvis believed the combination of offensive and defensive actions created a "rich tactical and strategic experience" that forced the player to frequently evaluate the situation's priorities. He further noted that the added complexity made the gameplay less monotonous, which differentiated it from other games that solely rely on a relentless battle that eventually kills the player character.

The element of flying over a planetscape was added after a brainstorming session between Jarvis and Ritchie. The landscape is depicted as a line only a pixel wide, primarily because the hardware was not powerful enough to generate anything more detailed. The background stars' movements were made slower than the ship in order to create a sense of depth.

=== Refinement and completion ===
By July, development was behind schedule and Jarvis's supervisor pressured him to finish the game to display at the then-upcoming Amusement & Music Operators Association (AMOA) trade show in September. Jarvis spent several weeks creating the astronauts, which his boss wanted to omit if the process did not hasten. The pressure frustrated Jarvis to the point he considered resigning. Around that time, Sam Dicker was hired as a new programmer. He assisted in programming the game and added audiovisual effects. Jarvis requested explosion animations similar to Galaxian. However, Dicker wanted something original and implemented a particle effect algorithm to generate unique explosions when enemies were destroyed. Like the rest of the team, Dicker's background was in pinball development, and he believed that overwhelming the player's senses with audiovisual input, similar to pinball machines, created an "adrenaline thrill" that fit well with reflex-style gameplay. The new elements re-invigorated Jarvis, who felt the project began to show promise.

Development then shifted focus to the enemies. Landers were given the ability to capture humans, and a new enemy was devised from the mechanic: "Mutants", captured humans that had turned hostile. The Mutants added a rescue element that Jarvis believed made the game more interesting and would encourage the player to continue playing. He applied the element of making a "comeback" to the planet and restored it and the humans after surviving five waves following the planet's destruction; Jarvis felt it mimicked the ups and downs of real life. "Bombers", enemies which release floating bombs on the screen, were added next. More enemies were added to create different gameplay elements. "Swarmers" and "Pods" were designed to attack the ship rather than the astronauts. "Baiters" were included prevent the spaceship from lingering and add pressure to the player. Based on a similar enemy in Asteroids, Baiters quickly follow the ship to collide with it. Tired of the predictable enemy patterns of older games, the team added an element of randomness to the enemies' behavior algorithms in order to force the player to adapt and improvise.

Defender remained unfinished by September, and almost every Williams programmer assisted with meeting the deadline for the AMOA trade show. The evening before the trade show, the arcade cabinets were delivered for display. However, the developers realized they had not created an attract mode to entice an audience and a high score system. After measuring how much space was available in the system's random-access memory to patch the program, they began working on those components that night. DeMar coded the attract mode, Dussault and Dicker created the high score table, and Jarvis playtested and fixed bugs. Early the next morning, the team created the final EPROM chips and installed them in a prototype board. As they improperly installed the chips, the game did not start and soon caught fire. After diagnosing the issue, the team created a new set of EPROMs and successfully activated the prototype. Once the components were operational, the team returned to their homes to prepare for the show.

After the AMOA trade show, the developers expanded the game to allow users to play indefinitely. The display model included five levels, which the team felt was more than enough because of the game's difficulty; most Williams employees could not progress past the third level and Jarvis's score of 60,000 points seemed unbeatable to them. While they believed it unlikely, the developers added more levels that repeated in order to be prepared for players that might exceed their expectations; they felt the game would be boring after level five otherwise.

=== Hardware ===
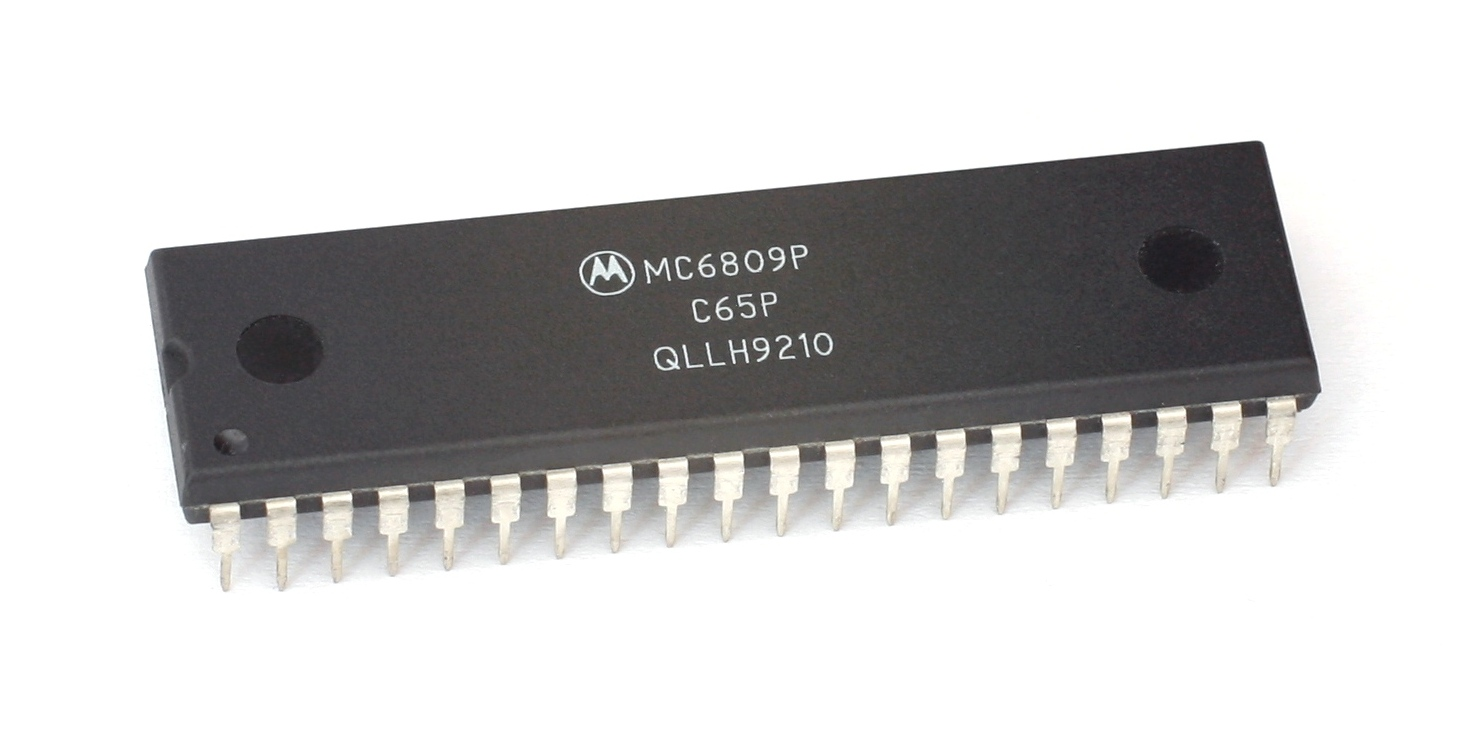
Defender uses a Motorola 6809 microprocessor (pictured) as the arcade machine's main CPU, a design that Williams Electronics continued use in its subsequent games in the early 1980s.

The game features amplified monaural sound and pixel graphics on a CRT monitor. Williams obtained the monitors from Electrohome and Wells Gardner. The machine consists of five circuit boards that coordinate different processes required to operate the game: a main central processing unit (CPU), a read-only memory (ROM) board, a soundboard, an interface controller board, and the power supply. A Motorola 6809 microprocessor acts as the CPU to execute the game code and assemble the graphics to display on the screen, while a Motorola 6800 microprocessor handles the audio. A pack of three AA batteries provide power to save the game's settings and high scores when the machine is unplugged from an electrical outlet. The cabinet artwork is stenciled on the wooden frame. Williams reused existing parts from its pinball production for the Defender cabinets: the coin door mechanism, the coin boxes, and the audio circuit boards.

When planning the hardware specifications, the staff first debated whether to use a black-and-white or color monitor. They chose a color monitor, reasoning that advanced technology would better establish them as good designers. The team estimated that the game would require four colors but chose hardware that could display each pixel in sixteen colors. At the time, they believed this was more than they would ever need for a game. The monitor's resolution is 320×256, an expansion from the then-industry standard of 256×256. The staff believed that the wider screen provided a better aspect ratio and would improve the presentation. Video games at the time relied on hardware components to animate graphics, but the developers decided to handle animation via software and programmed the game in assembly language. The switch allowed them to display more on-screen objects with less processing power.

The game's control scheme uses a two-way joystick and five buttons. Jarvis designed the controls to emulate both Space Invaders and Asteroids. The player's left hand moves the joystick similar to Space Invaders while the right hand presses buttons like Asteroids; the buttons that shoot projectiles and accelerate use a layout that mimics Asteroids's design. Jarvis reasoned that players were accustomed to the control schemes of past games and felt deviating from those designs would be difficult for them. Wico Corporation manufactured the joysticks for the production model of the arcade cabinets.

== Release ==
Williams promoted the game at trade shows before and following its release. The company pitched it as technologically advanced, highlighting the resolution, number of colors, number of onscreen game elements, and the diagnostic system. Williams unveiled Defender at the AMOA trade show in September 1980. A few months later in December, it was also on show at Advanced Automatic Sales' annual preview in San Francisco, California. In London, England, Williams promoted Defender at the Amusement Trades Exposition in January 1981. Williams continued to promote Defender in March at the Amusement Operators Expo in Chicago, Illinois, and in May at the Spring Game Show in Dallas, Texas.

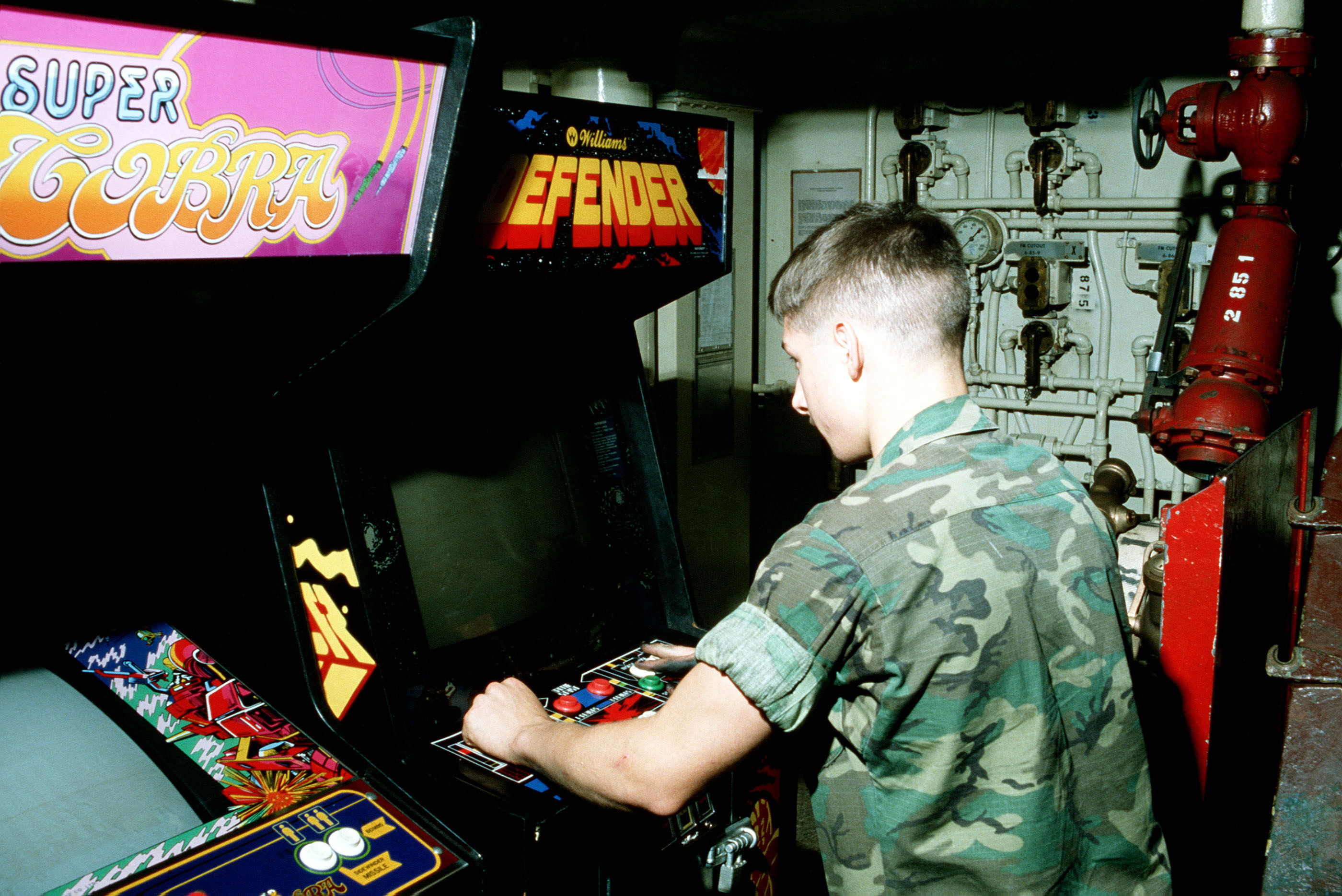
Defender was released in arcades in 1981. Shown is an American Marine playing the game in the USS America's arcade room in 1982.

The developers placed Defender in arcades for play testing. Although Jarvis was nervous after timid responses at the AMOA trade show, crowds gathered around the cabinet during its first nights. To meet the demand, Williams ran two production lines to build the arcade machines, which delayed creation of future games. The company made iterative upgrades to the machine's diagnostic system and expanded available options to arcade operators during the production run. Production initially focused on overseas orders, and on February 23, 1981, it switched to domestic production.

When exporting the game to Japan, Williams licensed it to Taito. While the program and language remained unchanged, the control panel was altered. Instructions in Japanese were affixed to the panel, and the reverse button was embedded in the top of the joystick. During the summer of 1981, Williams licensed production of Defender in the United Kingdom to Streets Automatic. Bob Deith from Ruffler and Deith shepherded Streets Automatic through the licensing negotiations. The licensee built 150 cabinets a week in its factory in Eastbourne, England.

Williams followed the release with a cocktail cabinet version soon after. The smaller cocktail cabinets had recently become popular in the United States, and Ken Fedesna, Williams' director of engineering, publicized the company's intent to release a cocktail version of Defender in March 1981. It created custom cocktail cabinets with wider panels to accommodate Defender's control scheme. The cocktail models were made available in June 1981. Taito released the cocktail-table cabinet as T.T. Defender in Japan to indicated it was a "table-top" version. Defender eventually became Williams' best-selling arcade game. During the years following its release, the company sold over 55,000 units worldwide. By 2020, it had sold 70,000 arcade machines.

=== Ports ===
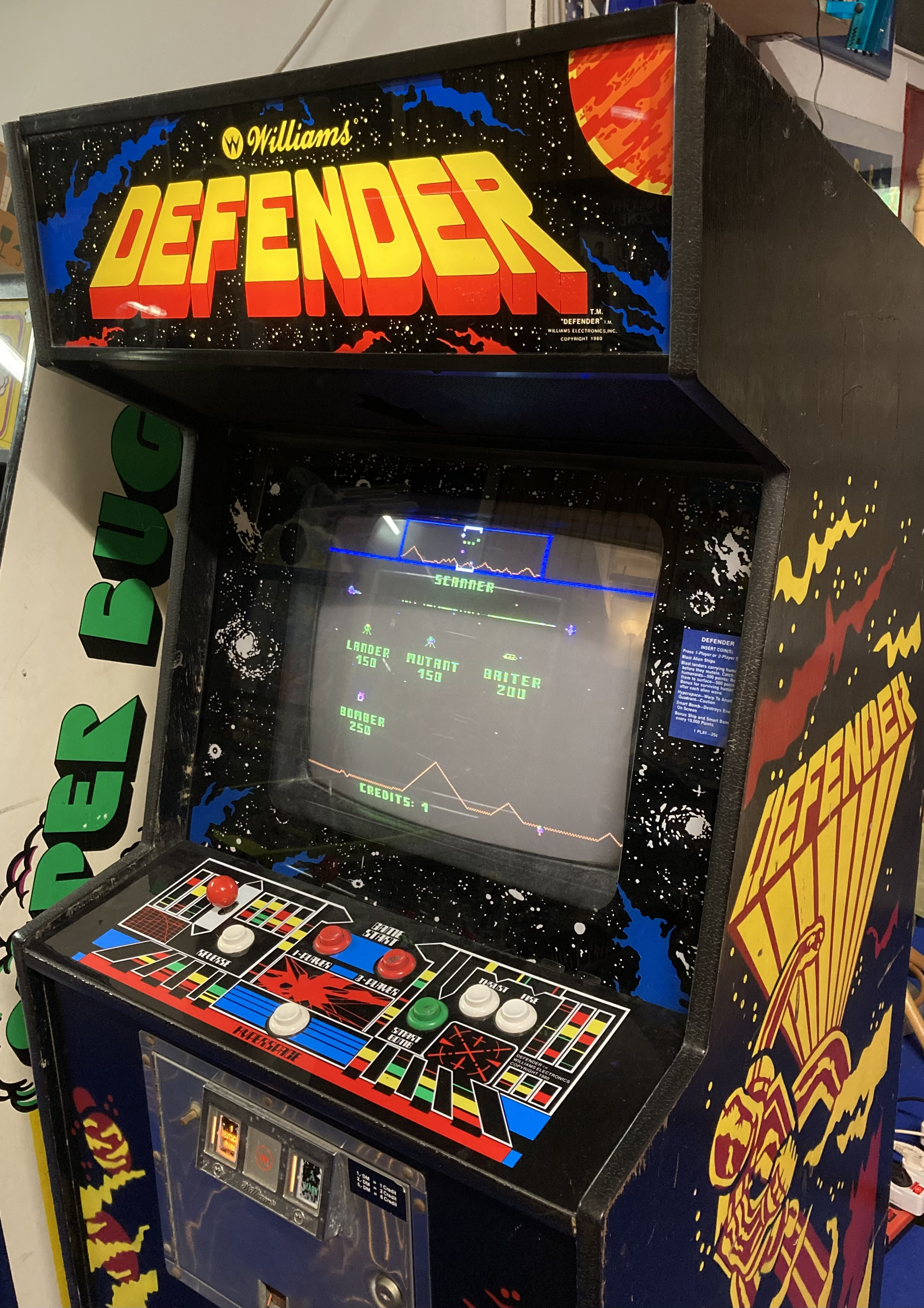
Upright arcade cabinet

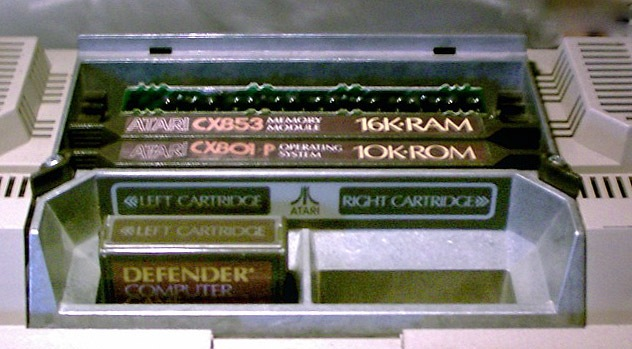
Atari 800 computer cartridge

Following its release in arcades, Defender was ported to several platforms.

Defender was ported to several video game consoles and home computers. Atari, Inc. obtained exclusive rights to distribute the game on consoles. The company first released Defender on its platforms in 1982. Bob Polaro converted the game to the Atari 2600; the port released in June 1982. Since the Atari 2600 game controller had a single button, Polaro adjusted the attack mechanism to change between firing a laser, launching a smart bomb, and activating hyperspace based on the ships height on the screen. A port with updated visuals for the then-newly released Atari 5200 followed in November. The company published a version programmed by Steve Baker on its Atari 8-bit computers that same year.

Atari released ports on other systems through its Atarisoft label between 1982 and 1983. The company assigned the various ports to different programmers; for example, Peter Farson, Greg Omi, and Joseph Simko handled the conversions to the Intellivision, VIC-20, and Commodore 64 platforms, respectively. For platforms that did not receive ports of Defender, companies published unofficial clones that mimicked the game's design.

Williams Entertainment (Note: Williams Electronics changed its name to WMS Industries in 1987, and after acquiring Tradewest in 1994, WMS Industries renamed the new subsidiary Williams Entertainment to release home ports of its arcade games.) included Defender in several multi-platform compilations: the 1995 Arcade Classic compilation by Nintendo, the 1996 Williams Arcade's Greatest Hits, the 2000 Midway's Greatest Arcade Hits, the 2003 Midway Arcade Treasures, and the 2012 Midway Arcade Origins. Many of the anthologies were created by Digital Eclipse, who used emulation to run the original source code. The company included Defender because of its high recognizability. In 2000, a web-based version of Defender, along with nine other classic arcade games, were published on Shockwave.com, Macromedia's game portal that used its Shockwave platform. Four years later, Midway Games (Note: WMS Industries purchased Midway in 1988 and later transferred its games to a new Midway Games subsidiary.) also launched a website featuring the Shockwave versions. Defender was ported to mobile phones in 2004. THQ Wireless developed a mobile phone version for distribution to the major wireless carriers in the fourth quarter of 2004.

Midway released an upgraded version on Xbox Live Arcade in November 2006 as part of Microsoft's "Xbox Live Arcade Wednesdays" campaign. It featured enhanced visuals, online leaderboards, achievements, and multiplayer. However, the game was abruptly removed from the online service in February 2010. Microsoft cited changes to the publisher rights. Defender, along with many other Midway arcade games, appear in the 2016 Midway Arcade expansion of Lego Dimensions. The developer, Traveller's Tales, considered recreating them in Lego form but decided to present them in their original forms to maintain what they felt made the games good. Lego versions of Defender characters appear outside the emulated games in the expansion's virtual Lego world. In 2021, the game joined other classic arcade games on the Antstream Arcade gaming platform. It left the service in 2023 after the licensing agreement expired.

=== Legal actions ===
Williams registered Defender and its components with the United States Copyright Office (1978 logo shown) and used the copyright to litigate unauthorized copies

In preparation for Defender's release, Williams filed copyright and trademark requests for individual components of the game. The company registered the cabinet artwork with the United States Copyright Office on December 3, 1980. Williams then filed a trademark request for the video game title with the United States Patent and Trademark Office on December 8, 1980. A few days later, it registered Defender's program with the US Copyright Office. Williams later registered copyrights for the game's audiovisuals in both the attract and play modes in March 1981.

When Williams discovered unauthorized copies of Defender, the company enforced its copyright to protect its investment of time and resources spent developing the game. During the Amusement Trades Exposition in England, the company's legal representatives obtained an injunction against French video game manufacturer Jeutel to remove its clone titled Defender's from the floor. Williams' president, Michael Stroll, discovered the French clone and inspected it on the first day of the show. Later that day, he contacted his lawyer, who successfully filed an injunction the next day. Williams pursued legal recourse in France, winning on appeal at the French Court of Cassation in 1985.

More copies appeared after the game's release. Williams filed lawsuits against them, such as Mayday and Defense Command, citing copyright infringement. Williams won against Artic International, who released Defense Command, in August 1982 in the United States Court of Appeals for the Third Circuit. Within the first six months that Defender was on the market, Williams had won cases in several United States district courts for infringement in New Jersey, Alabama, California, and Oregon.

Copies included special kits that arcade operators could use to build unsanctioned Defender cabinets. Williams pursued legal action against an operator in Russellville, Alabama, for using such kits. A district judge in the United States District Court for the Northern District of Alabama ruled in Williams' favor, which resulted in Williams obtaining the kits. An unauthorized mobile version was released in 2004 on Sony Ericsson phones. Midway filed a lawsuit against Sony Ericsson in June 2004 citing copyright infringement.

== Reception ==
The game was slow to gain popularity, not attracting much attention at the 1980 AMOA trade show. In retrospect, Jarvis believed its complexity intimidated many passersby. Defender's promotional debut elicited mixed reactions. Reviewing the trade show, David Pierson of Play Meter magazine felt Defender had the potential to be "top video [game] of the year" and listed it as an example of quality American products in response to the recent popularity of imported Japanese video games. He also praised Williams for releasing a strong initial product in a "highly competitive" market. Conversely, Dick Welu, also writing for Play Meter, felt it was a step backward in game design, negatively comparing it the 1977 Flying Fortress by Electra Games, and criticized the complex control panel.

Readers of Play Meter voted Defender the ninth top arcade game in March 1981. The game began to climb the poll's rankings soon after. At the beginning of April, it reached fourth and continued to rise a rank every two weeks, plateauing at second in May. It briefly topped the poll at the beginning of July. Six months after its release, the game was one of the top earners in the United States video game industry. In the first half of Williams' 1981 fiscal year, its net income—almost US$6 million—had already exceeded that of the previous fiscal year. Stroll attributed the increase to the success of Defender. On the 1981 arcade game charts, it topped the Play Meter arcade chart in August, and the RePlay arcade charts for most months between March and November. The annual Cash Box and RePlay arcade charts listed Defender as the second highest-grossing arcade game of 1981 in the US, below Pac-Man. The AMOA later listed Defender among the United States' six highest-grossing arcade games of 1982. Electronic Fun with Computers & Games magazine staff ranked it the thirteenth top arcade game of 1982. Defender also saw success in Japan, although not as much compared to Western markets; it tied with Turbo and Galaxian as Japan's 18th highest-grossing arcade video game of 1981. Defender eventually became one of the highest grossing arcade games ever, earning over US$1 billion.

Reception

Review scores
Publication	Score
AllGame	5/5
Eurogamer	8/10
Play Meter	9/10

Demar was surprised by Defender's popularity. At the time of its release, Stan Jarocki, director of marketing at then-competitor Midway Manufacturing, described the game as "amazing". Soon after its release, Tony Licata of Play Meter considered Defender a "solid entry" in the arcade market and described it as "extremely high" quality. He praised the audiovisuals, describing the graphics and sound as "excellent" and "super, respectively. However, Licata considered the explosions "too much" and "unnecessary".

A common point of discussion was Defender's challenging gameplay. In his 1981 video game guide How to Master the Video Games, Tom Hirschfeld noted that mastery requires perseverance and those that reach that level find it "worthwhile". Licata extolled the gameplay, specifically the complexity, which he felt increased its replay value. While he acknowledged it could dissuade some players, he believed them to be a small percentage and wrote that the variety of options will "hook" experienced players. He commended the designers for including the mini-map, which he considered an essential component. Conversely, Atari programmer Dona Bailey considered too many buttons troublesome and cited Defender as the "worst" example of such control schemes. Derrick Bang of Softline wrote in 1983 that Defender "remains one of the hardest arcade games ever developed" and that novices are rarely able to play longer than ten seconds.

=== Home versions ===
Port reception

Review scores
Publication	Score
AllGame	5200: 3.5/5
Computer and Video Games	2600: 90%
Eurogamer	XBLA: 6/10
IGN	XBLA: 5.5/10

Award
Publication	Award
Electronic Games	Best Science Fiction/Fantasy Videogame (1983)

The Atari 2600 release was overall received well in contemporary video game publications and became a best seller. Ed Driscoll of The Space Gamer wrote that despite the console's graphical limitations compared to the arcade hardware, Defender should be in players' game library. In comparing the port to the source material, he felt that arcade "purists" will miss the original controls. The port won the "Best Science Fiction/Fantasy Videogame" category in Electronic Games's 1983 Arcade Awards. The magazine editors praised the console conversion, calling it a "loving tribute to the original" that demonstrated the developer's ability to work within the Atari 2600's technical limitations. Reviewers for Computer and Video Games later rated the port favorably with 90% score, writing that it captures the original's "spirit and atmosphere". Atari sold over 3 million units in 1982, and that year, Defender became Atari's second best-selling home video game after Pac-Man. The next year, however, sales plunged during the video game crash of 1983.

The port to the Atari 5200 also received a generally favorable reception. David H. Ahl of Creative Computing Video & Arcade Games favorably compared the Atari 5200 release to the original version while noting the differences in controller hardware. He also highlighted the gameplay variations and wrote that it provide a "substantial challenge". The editor of The Video Game Update, Celeste Dolan, praised how well the console port reproduced the source material, calling it "a superior home rendition". She commended the audiovisuals and noted the improvements from the Atari 2600 port. Writing for AllGame, Earl Green praised it in a retrospective review years later. He called the port "decent" and a "pleasing mix" of the arcade game and the Atari 2600 conversion. He noted that the Atari 5200's controllers allowed for a more faithful reproduction of the arcade's controls; Green described the console's controls as "smooth and instinctive".

Reviews for the home computer versions were mixed. In 1983, Softline readers named the port for the Atari 8-bit computers fifth on the magazine's top thirty list of Atari programs by popularity. The magazine staff were more critical, stating that the "game's appeal does not justify its unreasonable cost" of being shipped on ROM cartridges. A reviewer for Computer Games magazine was critical of Atarisoft's IBM PC conversion. While they considered the action "very fast", the reviewer felt it soon became boring. They disparaged the keyboard controls, calling them unsuitable for the quick maneuvers the game requires, and recommended using a joystick instead.

Defender's inclusion in the various releases of Williams Arcade's Greatest Hits was considered a positive by gaming publications. A reviewer for Maximum: The Video Game Magazine lauded the "faithful recreation" and considered it an "incredible game" that remained playable over a decade later. Similarly, Alex Huhtala of Official Dreamcast Magazine praised the accurate emulation of the Dreamcast port and Defender's gameplay for holding up against contemporary standards. Writing for GamesMaster magazine, Robin Alway considered Defender one of the few "all-time classics" in the Dreamcast compilation.

The release on Xbox Live Arcade was not as well received. While acknowledging Defender's place in history, IGN's Erik Brudvig lamented it as one in a string of arcade re-releases on the service that offered little. He praised the updated controls but called the gameplay "outdated" and felt the "slightly enhanced" visuals did "little to impress". Kristan Reed of Eurogamer echoed similar comments about the graphical enhancements, calling them "pointless". Both reviewers considered the addition of multiplayer a positive yet flawed aspect. Brudvig believed the lack of progress sharing between players during gameplay and online lag made the experience "terrible". While Reed noted that finding a casual player online was unlikely, he believed it could be a good experience with a friend but did not feel it held much replay value.

=== Retrospective ===
Defender has received a positive retrospective reception years after its release as well. GameSpy's David Cuciz lauded its challenging gameplay, commenting that it is representative of what other games should be. He described the graphics as "beautiful", citing the varied sprites and flashing explosions. Matt Barton and Bill Loguidice of Gamasutra stated the audio-visuals and gameplay's depth balanced the excessive difficulty. They praised the game's "catch and rescue" feature, as well as the mini-map. Cuciz also praised the mini-map, describing it as an essential element that allows players to strategize. Pop culture writer John Sellers praised the audio-visuals and the connection between the game's plot and gameplay.

Video game journalist Steven L. Kent called it "one of the toughest games in arcade history." He stated that novices are able to play only a few seconds, and that enthusiasts saw proficiency as a "badge of honor". Cuciz echoed similar comments. Sellers described Defender's difficulty as "humbling", saying that few could play it proficiently. He further stated that players would continue to play despite the difficulty. Its difficulty is often attributed to its complex control scheme. Edge magazine staff called Defender "one of the most difficult-to-master" games, describing its controls as "daunting". Writing for Eurogamer, Spanner Spencer called it a "landmark" game that demanded more than its contemporaries. In describing it as one of the most difficult games, he wrote that the "rapid" gameplay required dexterity, strategy, and "100% of the player's concentration". Video game writer David Ellis attributes the game's success to its challenging design. Brett Alan Weiss of AllGame wrote that despite its complexity, Defender is among the "most influential and most popular games" as well as one of the highest grossing. He attributed the game's challenge and enjoyment to its combination of audiovisuals and "intense shooting action".

Several game developers have listed the game among their favorites. David Doak, a co-founder of Free Radical Design, pointed to its challenging yet addicting gameplay. Chris and Jason Kingsley, founders of Rebellion Developments, cited its on-screen action and visuals as well as its difficult control scheme and gameplay. While he described the gameplay as extremely demanding, Gary Penn from DMA Designs considered Defender exceptionally rewarding. Multiple Atari developers named it as their favorite game, including Larry Kaplan, Jerome Domurat, Alan Murphy, Eric Manghise, Rob Zdybel, George Kiss, and Howard Scott Warshaw.

Multiple publications have called Defender one the top video games released. In 1995, Flux magazine staff ranked the arcade version 34th in their "Top 100 Video Games" feature, calling it the "ultimate side scrolling arcade shooter". The next year, Next Generation editors placed it number 13 on their list of "Top 100 Games of All Time", saying that its balanced difficulty encouraged repeat play. GamesMaster magazine staff listed Defender number five in a similar list that same year. They described the game as "one of the greatest shoot-'em-ups of all time." In 1999, Next Generation staff listed Defender as number 23 on their "Top 50 Games of All Time", commenting that "despite exceptionally complicated controls, gamers fell in love at first sight." The following year, the editors of Edge magazine listed Defender the 64th title on its "100 Best Games of All Time". They called it the "quintessential old-school arcade" game, citing its visuals and "unconventional control setup".

Writing for GameSpot, Jeff Gerstmann inducted Defender into the website's list of the greatest games of all time in 2004. In 2008, Guinness World Records listed it as the number six arcade game in technical, creative, and cultural impact. That same year, Retro Gamer writers rated the game number ten on their list of "Top 25 Arcade Games", citing it as a technical achievement and a difficult title with addictive gameplay. Also in 2008, Edge ranked Defender the sixth best game from the 1980s. The editors described its design as very "elegant" despite a lack of narrative and characters. Writing for Forbes, Mike Stubbs called it the tenth most defining game from the 1980s, citing its challenging gameplay. In 2025, The Strong National Museum of Play inducted Defender into its World Video Game Hall of Fame. Jarvis and members of the development team attended the induction ceremony. Jeremy Saucier of The Strong Museum said "Defender’s punishing gameplay raised the level of competition in arcades, and it was among the first games to truly separate dedicated players from more casual ones."

== Legacy ==
After the success of Defender, Williams expanded by building a new facility and hired more employees. Jarvis was able to work in isolation prior to the expansion, but the influx of people created an environment he was unhappy with. Additionally, he felt that corporate structures were "stuffy". Despite Williams offering Jarvis a bonus for his work on Defender, he and DeMar resigned soon after to found their own development company, Vid Kidz. The company served as a consulting firm to Williams and developed a few games that Williams published.

Jarvis's contributions to the game's development are often cited among his accolades. John Vince, a professor of digital media, considered him one of the originators of "high-action" and "reflex-based" arcade games, citing Defender's gameplay among Jarvis's other games. Ellis described Jarvis as the inaugural "hard-core" designer due to Defender's challenging yet commercially successful gameplay. Barton and Loguidice as well as Sellers wrote that the game helped establish Williams and Jarvis as key figures in the arcade game industry. Defender was listed as one of Jarvis's achievements when he was awarded the Lifetime Achievement Award at the 2005 Game Developers Choice Awards. In 2007, IGN editors listed Eugene Jarvis as a top game designer whose titles, including Defender, have influenced the video game industry.

=== Sequels and remakes ===
The game has been followed by sequels and remade multiple times since its arcade release. The first was the 1981 Stargate, which Vid Kidz developed for Williams. The success of Defender prompted Williams to release more video games as soon as possible. Rather than create a new original game, DeMar suggested making an enhanced version of Defender to meet Williams' four-month deadline. Developed as a sequel to Defender, Stargate features new more challenging elements and improved the original's performance. Stargate was also released on home platforms, sometimes as Defender 2. However, it was not as successful as its predecessor and did not receive as wide as a release. Epyx published Revenge of Defender in the North American market in 1988. Before Epyx obtained an official license, the game was a clone named StarRay that Logotron had released in the United Kingdom. Atari Games released another sequel, also titled Defender 2, for Atari ST and Amiga home computers in 1990 under its Arc label. Developed by Jeff Minter, the sequel combines features from the first two games and incorporated new elements. Both the original Defender and Stargate are included.

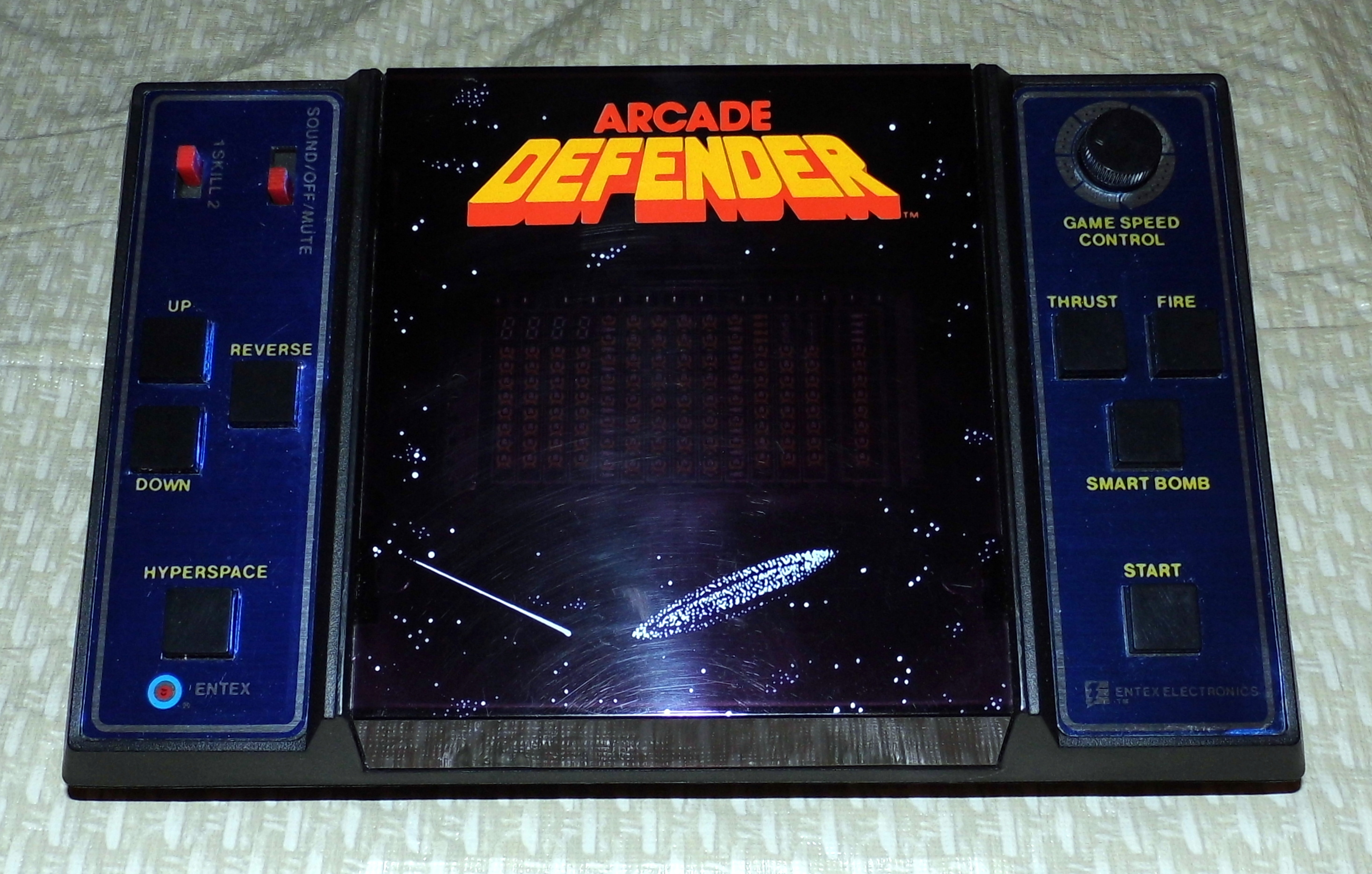
Entex Industries released an handheld electronic game version (pictured) of Defender as well as a ROM cartridge for its Entex Adventure Vision console.

Remakes have taken the form of electronic games, board games, and video games. Williams released a Defender-themed pinball machine in 1982. It has many elements from the original game: sound effects, enemies, waves, and weapons. Williams produced fewer than 400 units. Milton Bradley adapted the arcade game into a board game. Entex Industries created an handheld electronic game version in 1982. It also released a ROM cartridge version for its LED-based tabletop game console, the Entex Adventure Vision. Tiger Electronics released a keychain-sized electronic game adaption with a grayscale LCD screen in 1997.

The 2002 home console remake, also titled Defender, changed the original design from 2D side view to 3D rear view.

In 1991, Midway Games released Strike Force, which features gameplay similar to Defender. The gaming press noted the similitude and referred to Strike Force as an update or possible sequel to Defender. Following a successful remake of Tempest, Atari tapped Minter again to create Defender 2000 for the Atari Jaguar in 1996. In addition to the original version, the remake has two updated modes—Defender Plus and Defender 2000—that feature new visuals and gameplay elements. Midway released two remakes in 2002, one for home consoles and another for the Game Boy Advance. Similar to Defender 2000, the handheld console release has three modes of play: Classic, which is the original arcade version; Defender XP, which features updated visuals; and Defender XGP, which has new visuals and gameplay elements. A 3D remake titled Defender was released in 2002 for major sixth generation home consoles. Featuring 3D graphics, it depicts the gameplay from a third-person viewpoint behind the starship.

=== Industry impact ===
James Hague of Dadgum Games called Defender a landmark title from the 1980s. It is considered the first side-scrolling shoot 'em up, predating Scramble by two months. In describing it as a classic title, Vince wrote that Defender introduced new technology to games, specifically scrolling. Stearny said that its use of scrolling helped remove design limitations associated with the screen. Cuciz stated that the scrolling introduced the "first true gaming environment". Minter made similar comments. Developer Andrew Braybrook described Defender's game world as "much less of a controlled environment" than previous games that restricted gameplay to a single static screen.

Bill Kunkel of Electronic Games observed that numerous Defender clones had appeared in the arcade market in 1981. Loguidice and Barton noted that later side-scrolling shooters derived their basic format from Defender, listing the 1983 The Tail of Beta Lyrae and the 1987 R-Type as examples. Other games draw more heavily on Defender; for example, the 1986 Fantasy Zone and its sequels allow the player to fly ships in all directions in a scrolling environment that loops.

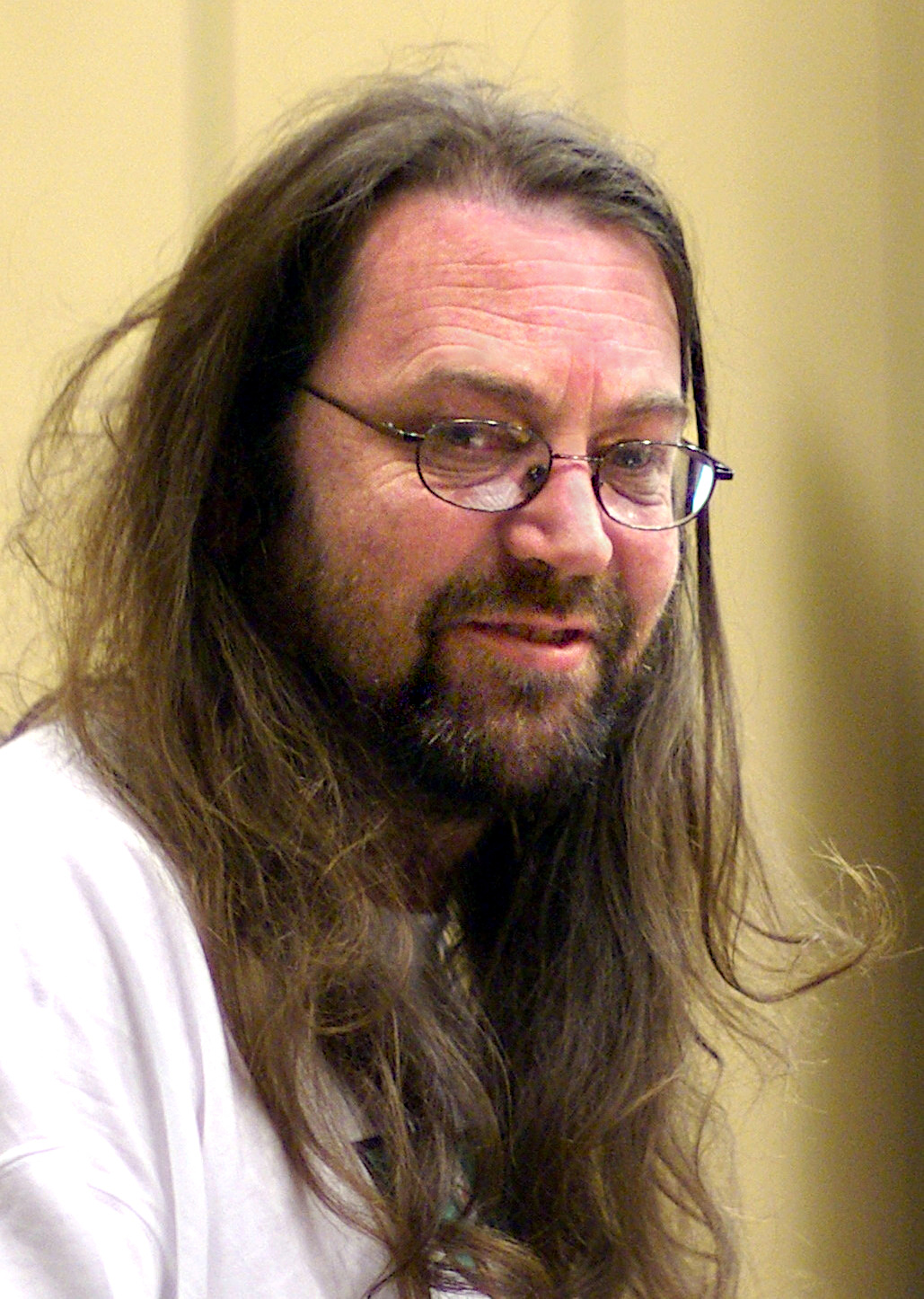
Jeff Minter (shown in 2007) was inspired by Defender to create the clone Andes Attack in 1982 early in his career. He later created an official sequel, Defender 2 in 1990, and remake, Defender 2000 in 1996.

Several home console and computer games copied Defender, while others built upon its design. Early clones include the 1981 releases Gorgon and Alien Defense on the Apple II and the TRS 80 Model III, respectively. Acornsoft released a clone titled Defender in 1982 for its BBC Micro platform; the company later renamed it to Planetoid to avoid litigation. More facsimiles, such as Defense Command, Repton, Dropzone, and Protector II, continued to be released from 1982 to 1984. Chopper Command for the Atari 2600 and Choplifter for the Apple II, both released in 1982, feature attack helicopters while drawing inspiration from Defender's gameplay. Minter also based several games on its design, starting with Andes Attack for the VIC-20 computer. While many of his projects retain similar elements from Defender, Minter aimed to inject more originally into his subsequent games.

Jim Whitehead, a professor of computer science, described Defender as a breakthrough title for its use of full 2D motion, multiple goals, and complex gameplay that provides players with several methods to play. Cuciz said that though the game's mini-map feature had been introduced before, Defender integrated it into the gameplay in a more essential manner. Ellis stated that prior to Defender, companies designed video games to have a balanced challenge that would attract players but limit play time to a few minutes. They believed gameplay too challenging would dissuade players. Loguidice and Barton commented that Defender's success, along with Robotron: 2084, illustrated that the market was ready for more difficult games, which spurred developers to create more complex game designs.

=== Cultural impact ===
Defender has permeated numerous cultural aspects of society. Musicians have referenced the game in their songs: Manilla Road's song "Defender" on their 1982 album Metal, Buckner & Garcia's song "The Defender" on their 1982 album Pac-Man Fever, the Beastie Boys' song "Body Movin'" on their 1998 album Hello Nasty, and mc chris's song "Never Give Up" from his 2008 album mc chris is dead. In 2000, the United States Postal Service released a postage stamp featuring children playing Defender on the Atari 2600 as part of its Celebrate the Century series. Guinness World Records later recognized this as the first video game to appear on a stamp. In 2008, Mathieu Henri recreated the game in the favicon, which is 16 x 16 pixels, of his homepage. Named Defender of the Favicon, the conversion earned him a Guinness World Records for "Smallest conversion of an arcade game".

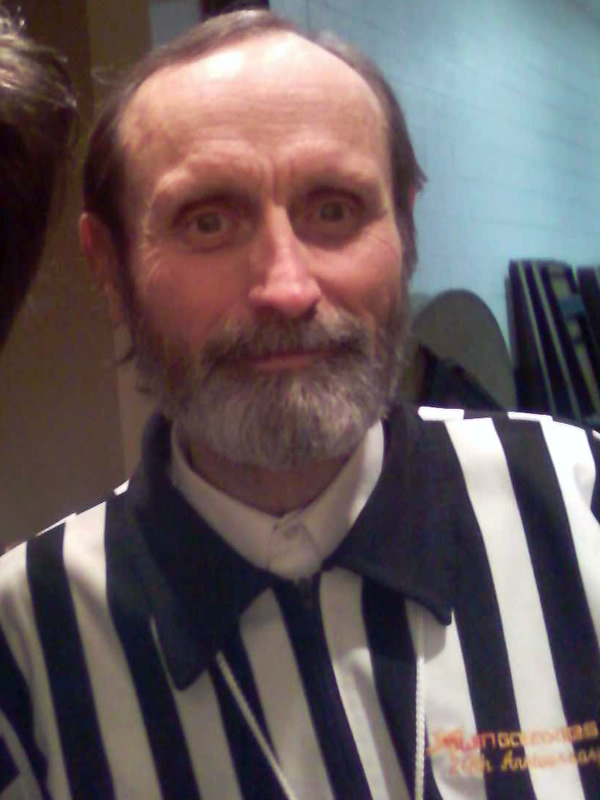
Twin Galaxies, which was run by Walter Day (shown in 2009), organized a national Defender competition and tracked high scores for the game.

Players have competed to obtain the highest score at the game and the longest play time on a single credit. Expert players learned to exploit software bugs to extend the length of their play time. One bug allows a player to earn a large number of "extra lives" so they can leave the game unattended to rest. Other bugs aid the ship in avoiding enemy attacks. Competitive playing was popularized in January 1982 after Steve Juraszek played Defender over 16 1/2 hours to a score almost 16 million points. Although the record's authenticity was questioned, the media attention spurred more attempts, and soon after, other players surpassed the record. Twin Galaxies, who officiated and tracked competitive high scores for players, organized a "National Defender Day" in April 1982 for players in twenty-four locations to compete for the game's top score.

Soon after, video game magazines began publishing high scores, with Defender scores appearing for over a year. Twin Galaxies continued tracking high scores on the arcade version for tournaments and marathon style of play; for consistency, it designated specific arcade machine settings for tournaments. Twin Galaxies also recorded high scores for home versions into the 2000s. At the 2008 Annual International Classic Video Game & Pinball Tournament, Guinness World Records adjudicated the event, which included a special high score contest for Defender and its sequel, Stargate.
