= Anarchism (Miller book) =

1984 book-length survey of anarchism

- Author: David Miller
- Subject: Anarchism
- Publisher: J. M. Dent
- Publication date: 1984
- Pages: 216
- ISBN: 0-460-10093-9

Anarchism is a book-length survey of anarchism written by David Miller and published by J. M. Dent in 1984.
