= List of Mortal Kombat media =

Mortal Kombat is a video game franchise originally developed and produced by Midway Games. The video games are a series of fighting games and several action-adventure games which debuted in North American arcades on October 8, 1992 with the release of Mortal Kombat, created by Ed Boon and John Tobias. Mortal Kombat titles have been released on numerous different video game consoles, handheld game consoles, and personal computer platforms and is considered one of the best-selling video game franchises of all time with over 26 million games sold. The games have appeared on every major video game console produced since its debut including every console created by Sony and Microsoft, every console produced by Sega since the Sega Genesis (as well as the Master System in Europe and South America), and every console produced by Nintendo, bar the Wii U, since the Super NES. Turbo Technologies Inc. (TTI) was offered exclusive rights to Mortal Kombat but NEC turned it down.

Since their release, many of the video games have been re-released on multiple platforms or included as part of compilation packages. The characters have also made cameo appearances in several other games. The video game series includes 24 differently named games, eleven of which are original fighting games, three of which are action-adventure games, and ten others which are re-releases, upgrades and ports. Along with the video game series three feature films, an animated and live-action television series, two books, and several comic books have been produced for the franchise. The first feature film was considered a major success and grossed roughly $70 million in the United States, and an estimated $122 million worldwide.

== Video games ==
=== Main series ===
| Game | Details |
|---|---|
| Mortal Kombat Original release date: NA: October 8, 1992 | Release years by system: 1992 – Arcade; 1993 – Game Boy, Game Gear, Genesis, Master System, Super NES; 1994 – Amiga, MS-DOS, Sega CD; 2004 – Mobile phone, PlayStation 2, Xbox; 2006 – Windows |
| Mortal Kombat Original release date: NA: October 8, 1992 | Notes: The game was not specifically released on the PlayStation 2 and Xbox but rather it was released as part of the Limited Edition version of Mortal Kombat: Deception. The game was also released in 2006 as part of the Midway Arcade Treasures Deluxe Edition compilation. |
| Mortal Kombat II Original release date: NA: 1993 | Release years by system: 1993 – Arcade; 1994 – Amiga, Game Boy, MS-DOS, 32X, Game Gear, Genesis, Master System, Super NES; 1996 – PlayStation, Sega Saturn; 2004 – GameCube, PlayStation 2, Xbox; 2005 – PlayStation 2, PlayStation Portable, Xbox; 2006 – Windows; 2007 – PlayStation 3 (PlayStation Network) |
| Mortal Kombat II Original release date: NA: 1993 | Notes: The game was not specifically released on the GameCube, PlayStation 2, and Xbox in 2004 but instead was included in the Midway Arcade Treasures 2 compilation and was later released again as part of the Midway Arcade Treasures: Extended Play for the PlayStation Portable and the Midway Arcade Treasures Deluxe Edition for PCs.; The game was not specifically released on the PlayStation 2 and Xbox in 2005 but instead was playable in Mortal Kombat: Shaolin Monks either by a cheat code or by doing certain hidden missions. |
| Mortal Kombat 3 Original release date: NA: 1995 | Release years by system: 1995 – Arcade, Game Boy, PlayStation, Genesis, Super NES; 1996 – MS-DOS, Game Gear, Master System; 2004 – GameCube, PlayStation 2, Xbox; 2005 – PlayStation Portable; 2006 – Windows |
| Mortal Kombat 3 Original release date: NA: 1995 | Notes: The game was not specifically released on the GameCube, PlayStation 2, and Xbox in 2004 but instead was included in the Midway Arcade Treasures 2 compilation and was later released again as part of the Midway Arcade Treasures: Extended Play for the PlayStation Portable and the Midway Arcade Treasures Deluxe Edition for PCs. |
| Mortal Kombat 4 Original release date: NA: 1997 | Release years by system: 1997 – Arcade; 1998 – Nintendo 64, Windows, PlayStation; 1999 – Game Boy Color |
| Mortal Kombat 4 Original release date: NA: 1997 | Notes: Last released Mortal Kombat arcade game |
| Mortal Kombat: Deadly Alliance Original release dates: NA: November 20, 2002; EU: February 14, 2003 | Release years by system: 2002 – Game Boy Advance, GameCube, PlayStation 2, Xbox |
| Mortal Kombat: Deadly Alliance Original release dates: NA: November 20, 2002; EU: February 14, 2003 | Notes: A second Game Boy Advance port titled Mortal Kombat: Tournament Edition was released starting on August 25, 2003. |
| Mortal Kombat: Deception Original release date: NA: October 4, 2004; EU: November 19, 2004 | Release years by system: 2004 – PlayStation 2, Xbox; 2005 – GameCube |
| Mortal Kombat: Deception Original release date: NA: October 4, 2004; EU: November 19, 2004 | Notes: Renamed as Mortal Kombat: Mystification in France due to translation issues.; The game was released with two limited editions, one for each system. The PlayStation 2 version was released with a "Premium Edition" and the Xbox version was released with a "Kollector's Edition". Each limited edition contained the original Mortal Kombat game among other limited items. |
| Mortal Kombat: Armageddon Original release dates: NA: October 9, 2006; AU: October 26, 2006; EU: October 27, 2006 | Release years by system: 2006 – PlayStation 2, Xbox; 2007 – Wii |
| Mortal Kombat: Armageddon Original release dates: NA: October 9, 2006; AU: October 26, 2006; EU: October 27, 2006 | Notes: The PlayStation 2 version of the game had a limited "Premium Edition" with four unique box fronts, a playable version of the original Ultimate Mortal Kombat 3, and several other extras. |
| Mortal Kombat vs. DC Universe Original release dates: NA: November 10, 2008; EU: November 21, 2008; AU: November 21, 2008 | Release years by system: 2008 – PlayStation 3, Xbox 360 |
| Mortal Kombat vs. DC Universe Original release dates: NA: November 10, 2008; EU: November 21, 2008; AU: November 21, 2008 | Notes: A crossover game with Mortal Kombat characters and DC Comics characters. |
| Mortal Kombat Original release date: NA: April 19, 2011 | Release years by system: 2011 – PlayStation 3, Xbox 360; 2012 – PlayStation Vita; 2013 – Windows |
| Mortal Kombat Original release date: NA: April 19, 2011 | Notes: First game in the Mortal Kombat series to not be developed and produced by Midway Games.; Developed by NetherRealm Studios, formerly known as Midway Studios - Chicago. |
| Mortal Kombat X Original release date: NA: April 14, 2015 | Release years by system: 2015 – Windows, PlayStation 4, Xbox One, iOS, Android |
| Mortal Kombat X Original release date: NA: April 14, 2015 | Notes: Developed by NetherRealm Studios. |
| Mortal Kombat 11 Original release date: NA: April 23, 2019 | Release years by system: 2019 – Windows, PlayStation 4, Xbox One, Nintendo Switch |
| Mortal Kombat 11 Original release date: NA: April 23, 2019 | Notes: Developed by NetherRealm Studios. |
| Mortal Kombat 1 Original release date: NA: September 19, 2023 | Release years by system: 2023 – Windows, PlayStation 5, Xbox Series X and S, Nintendo Switch |
| Mortal Kombat 1 Original release date: NA: September 19, 2023 | Notes: Developed by NetherRealm Studios. |

=== Spin-offs ===
| Game | Details |
|---|---|
| Mortal Kombat Mythologies: Sub-Zero Original release dates: NA: October 1, 1997; EU: December 1997 | Release years by system: 1997 – Nintendo 64, PlayStation |
| Mortal Kombat Mythologies: Sub-Zero Original release dates: NA: October 1, 1997; EU: December 1997 | Notes: An spin-off action-adventure game and the first non-fighting Mortal Kombat game. |
| Mortal Kombat: Special Forces Original release dates: NA: July 30, 2000; EU: September 29, 2000 | Release years by system: 2000 – PlayStation |
| Mortal Kombat: Special Forces Original release dates: NA: July 30, 2000; EU: September 29, 2000 | Notes: An spin-off action-adventure game and the second non-fighting Mortal Kombat game. |
| Mortal Kombat: Shaolin Monks Original release dates: NA: September 16, 2005; EU: September 30, 2005 | Release years by system: 2005 – PlayStation 2, Xbox |
| Mortal Kombat: Shaolin Monks Original release dates: NA: September 16, 2005; EU: September 30, 2005 | Notes: An spin-off action-adventure game and the third non-fighting Mortal Kombat game.; An arcade port of Mortal Kombat II can be unlocked in the game via completing hidden missions or by a cheat code. |
| Mortal Kombat: Onslaught Proposed release date: 2023 | Proposed system release: 2023 – Android, iOS |
| Mortal Kombat: Onslaught Proposed release date: 2023 | Notes: An spin-off action-adventure beat 'em up role-playing game and the fourth non-fighting Mortal Kombat game.; Developed by NetherRealm Studios. |

=== Updated versions ===
| Game | Details |
|---|---|
| Ultimate Mortal Kombat 3 Original release date: NA: 1995 | Release years by system: 1995 – Arcade; 1996 – Super NES, Genesis, Sega Saturn; 2006 – Xbox 360 (Xbox Live Arcade) |
| Ultimate Mortal Kombat 3 Original release date: NA: 1995 | Notes: Upgraded version of Mortal Kombat 3 |
| Mortal Kombat Trilogy Original release date: NA: 1996 | Release years by system: 1996 – Nintendo 64, PlayStation; 1997 – MS-DOS, Windows, Sega Saturn; 1998 – Game.com |
| Mortal Kombat Trilogy Original release date: NA: 1996 | Notes: Second upgraded version of Mortal Kombat 3 |
| Mortal Kombat Gold Original release date: NA: August 31, 1999 | Release years by system: 1999 – Dreamcast |
| Mortal Kombat Gold Original release date: NA: August 31, 1999 | Notes: Upgraded version of Mortal Kombat 4 |
| Mortal Kombat Advance Original release dates: NA: December 12, 2001; EU: March 1, 2002 | Release years by system: 2001 – Game Boy Advance |
| Mortal Kombat Advance Original release dates: NA: December 12, 2001; EU: March 1, 2002 | Notes: The Game Boy Advance version of Ultimate Mortal Kombat 3 |
| Mortal Kombat: Tournament Edition Original release dates: EU: August 25, 2003; NA: August 27, 2003 | Release years by system: 2003 – Game Boy Advance |
| Mortal Kombat: Tournament Edition Original release dates: EU: August 25, 2003; NA: August 27, 2003 | Notes: The second GBA version of Mortal Kombat: Deadly Alliance |
| Mortal Kombat: Unchained Original release dates: AU: November 9, 2006; NA: November 15, 2006; EU: November 24, 2006 | Release years by system: 2006 – PlayStation Portable |
| Mortal Kombat: Unchained Original release dates: AU: November 9, 2006; NA: November 15, 2006; EU: November 24, 2006 | Notes: The PSP version of Mortal Kombat: Deception |
| Ultimate Mortal Kombat Original release dates: NA: November 12, 2007; EU: December 7, 2007; AU: December 13, 2007 | Release years by system: 2007 – Nintendo DS |
| Ultimate Mortal Kombat Original release dates: NA: November 12, 2007; EU: December 7, 2007; AU: December 13, 2007 | Notes: Re-release of Ultimate Mortal Kombat 3 on the Nintendo DS with additional features |
| Mortal Kombat: Komplete Edition Original release date: NA: August 31, 2011 | Release years by system: 2011 – PlayStation 3, Windows, Xbox 360 |
| Mortal Kombat: Komplete Edition Original release date: NA: August 31, 2011 | Notes: An upgraded version containing all DLCs released for the 2011 Mortal Kombat |
| Mortal Kombat Mobile Original release dates: NA: April 7, 2015; EU: May 5, 2015 | Release years by system: 2015 – iOS, Android |
| Mortal Kombat Mobile Original release dates: NA: April 7, 2015; EU: May 5, 2015 | Notes: Mobile version of Mortal Kombat X |
| Mortal Kombat XL Original release dates: NA: March 1, 2016; EU: March 4, 2016 | Release years by system: 2016 – PlayStation 4, Windows, Xbox One |
| Mortal Kombat XL Original release dates: NA: March 1, 2016; EU: March 4, 2016 | Notes: An upgraded version containing all DLCs released for Mortal Kombat X |
| Mortal Kombat 11: Aftermath Original release dates: NA: May 26, 2020 | Release years by system: 2020 – PlayStation 4 |
| Mortal Kombat 11: Aftermath Original release dates: NA: May 26, 2020 | Notes: This expansion includes an additional story mode, three new characters, new stages, and the return of stage fatalities and the friendship finishing move |
| Mortal Kombat 11: Ultimate Original release dates: NA: November 17, 2020 | Release years by system: 2020 – PlayStation 4, PlayStation 5, Windows, Xbox One, Xbox Series X |
| Mortal Kombat 11: Ultimate Original release dates: NA: November 17, 2020 | Notes: An upgraded version containing all DLCs released for Mortal Kombat 11 with the free upgrade for the PlayStation 5 and Xbox Series X |
| Mortal Kombat 1: Khaos Reigns Original release date: NA: 2024 | Release years by system: |
| Mortal Kombat 1: Khaos Reigns Original release date: NA: 2024 | Notes: Story expansion for Mortal Kombat 1 including a new story campaign and Kombat Pack 2 content. |
| Mortal Kombat 1: Definitive Edition Original release date: NA: May 14, 2025 | Release years by system: 2025 – PlayStation 5, Xbox Series X|S, Nintendo Switch, Windows |
| Mortal Kombat 1: Definitive Edition Original release date: NA: May 14, 2025 | Notes: Bundle including the base game, Khaos Reigns story expansion, Kombat Packs, and additional content. |

=== Compilations and bundles ===
| Game | Details |
|---|---|
| Mortal Kombat & Mortal Kombat II Original release date: NA: September 10, 1998 | Release years by system: 1998 – Game Boy, Personal computer |
| Mortal Kombat & Mortal Kombat II Original release date: NA: September 10, 1998 | Notes: A compilation of Mortal Kombat and Mortal Kombat II. |
| Mortal Kombat Kollection Original release date: NA: September 30, 2008 | Release years by system: 2008 – PlayStation 2 |
| Mortal Kombat Kollection Original release date: NA: September 30, 2008 | Notes: A bundle of Mortal Kombat: Deception, Mortal Kombat: Shaolin Monks, and Mortal Kombat: Armageddon. |
| Mortal Kombat Arcade Kollection Original release date: NA: August 31, 2011; EU: August 31, 2011; AU: August 31, 2011 | Release years by system: 2011 – PlayStation 3 (PlayStation Network), Xbox 360 (Xbox Live Arcade); 2012 – Windows |
| Mortal Kombat Arcade Kollection Original release date: NA: August 31, 2011; EU: August 31, 2011; AU: August 31, 2011 | Notes: A compilation of Mortal Kombat, Mortal Kombat II, and Ultimate Mortal Kombat 3 with online play. |
| Mortal Kombat: Legacy Kollection Proposed release date: 2025 | Proposed system release: 2025 – PlayStation 4, PlayStation 5, Xbox One, Xbox Series X and S, Nintendo Switch, Nintendo Switch 2, Microsoft Windows |
| Mortal Kombat: Legacy Kollection Proposed release date: 2025 | Notes: A compilation of Mortal Kombat, Mortal Kombat II, Mortal Kombat 3, Ultimate Mortal Kombat 3, Mortal Kombat Trilogy, Mortal Kombat Mythologies: Sub-Zero, Mortal Kombat 4, Mortal Kombat: Special Forces, Mortal Kombat Advance, Mortal Kombat: Deadly Alliance and Mortal Kombat: Tournament Edition. Developed by Digital Eclipse. |
| Mortal Kombat: Elder God Bundle Original release date: NA: November 10, 2025; EU: November 10, 2025; AU: November 10, 2025 | Release years by system: 2025 – Steam, PlayStation 5, Xbox Series X and S |
| Mortal Kombat: Elder God Bundle Original release date: NA: November 10, 2025; EU: November 10, 2025; AU: November 10, 2025 | Notes: A bundle of Mortal Kombat XL, Mortal Kombat 11: Ultimate, and Mortal Kombat 1: Definitive Edition. |

== Films and television ==
| Game | Details |
|---|---|
| Mortal Kombat: The Journey Begins 1995 – Animated film | Notes: Animated film released by Threshold Entertainment as a tie-in to the Mortal Kombat feature film |
| Mortal Kombat 1995 – Live action film | Notes: Feature film based on the video game series.; Directed by Paul W. S. Anderson. |
| Mortal Kombat: Defenders of the Realm 1996 – Animated series | Notes: Also known as Mortal Kombat: The Animated Series.; Animated TV series based on the video game series.; 13 total episodes shown from September to December 1996.; Produced by Threshold Entertainment. |
| Mortal Kombat Annihilation 1997 – Live action film | Notes: Second feature film based on the video game series.; Directed by John R. Leonetti. |
| Mortal Kombat: Conquest 1998 – Live action TV series | Notes: Live action TV series based on the video game series.; 22 total episodes aired between 1998 and 1999.; Produced by Threshold Entertainment in association with New Line Television.; Syndicated by Warner Bros. Television Distribution and later picked up by TNT. |
| Mortal Kombat: Legacy 2011 – Live action web series | Notes: Live action web series created after the Mortal Kombat: Rebirth pitch to Warner Bros.; Directed by Kevin Tancharoen. |
| Mortal Kombat Legends: Scorpion's Revenge 2020 – Animated film | Notes: Animated film by Warner Bros. Animation. |
| Mortal Kombat 2021 – Live action film | Notes: Feature reboot film directed by Simon McQuoid. |
| Mortal Kombat Legends: Battle of the Realms 2021 – Animated film | Notes: Animated film by Warner Bros. Animation. |
| Mortal Kombat Legends: Snow Blind 2022 – Animated film | Notes: Animated film by Warner Bros. Animation. |
| Mortal Kombat Legends: Cage Match 2023 – Animated film | Notes: Animated film by Warner Bros. Animation. |
| Mortal Kombat II 2026 – Live action film | Notes: Directed by Simon McQuoid. |

== Printed media ==
=== Novels ===
| Title | Release date | Author | Publisher | Pages | ISBN |
|---|---|---|---|---|---|
| Mortal Kombat | 1995 | Kevin Droney, Martin Delrio | Tor Books | 216 | ISBN 0-8125-4452-8 |
| Mortal Kombat Annihilation | 1998 | Jerome Preisler | Torkids | 95 | ISBN 0-7806-2205-7 |

=== Comics ===
| Issues | Title | Release date | Publisher |
|---|---|---|---|
| 1 | Mortal Kombat Collector's Edition | 1992 | Midway |
| 1 | Mortal Kombat II Collector's Edition | 1993 | Midway |
| 6 | Mortal Kombat: Blood & Thunder | 1994 | Malibu Comics |
Notes: 1. A Slow Boat to China; 2. Test Your Might; 3. The Art of War; 4. Kombat Zones; 5. Tao; 6. Mortal Mayhem
| 3 | Mortal Kombat: Goro, Prince of Pain | 1994 | Malibu Comics |
Notes: 1. Stranger in a Strange Land; 2. Down and Out in Outworld; 3. Armed and Dangerous
| 1 | Mortal Kombat: Tournament Edition | 1994 | Malibu Comics |
Notes: 1. With Friends Like These...
| 6 | Mortal Kombat: Battlewave | 1995 | Malibu Comics |
Notes: 1. Where The Wild Things Are!; 2. A Fighting Chance; 3. No Guts, No Glory; 4. Days Of Thunder, Nights Of Pain; 5. The Killing Fields and The Gift; 6. Death Moves and Every Dog Has Its Day
| 2 | Mortal Kombat: U.S. Special Forces | 1995 | Malibu Comics |
Notes: 1. Secret Treasures & Kano in 'Break Out'; 2. Secret Treasures Part 2
| 3 | Mortal Kombat: Rayden and Kano | 1995 | Malibu Comics |
Notes: 1. Eye of the Storm; 2. The Evil That Men Do; 3. When Part the Heavens...
| 1 | Mortal Kombat: Tournament Edition II | 1995 | Malibu Comics |
Notes: 1. A Cold Day in Hell
| 1 | Mortal Kombat: Baraka | 1995 | Malibu Comics |
Notes: 1. Babality
| 1 | Mortal Kombat: Kung Lao | 1995 | Malibu Comics |
Notes: 1. Rising Son
| 1 | Mortal Kombat: Kitana and Mileena | 1995 | Malibu Comics |
Notes: 1. Sister Act
| 1 | Mortal Kombat 4 Limited Edition | 1997 | Midway |
| 1 | Mortal Kombat VS DC Universe: Beginnings | 2008 | DC Comics |
| 36 | Mortal Kombat X: Blood Ties | 2015 | DC Comics |
Notes: 1. Blood Ties (Chapter 1-12); 2. Blood Gods (Chapter 13-24); 3. Blood Island (Chapter 25-36)
| 1 | Mortal Kombat: Onslaught | 2023 | DC Comics |

== Music ==
| Title | Release date | Length | Label |
|---|---|---|---|
| Mortal Kombat II: Music from the Arcade Game Soundtrack | 1993 | 38:44 | Midway |
| Mortal Kombat: The Album | May 31, 1994 | 38:27 | Virgin Records |
| Mortal Kombat: Original Motion Picture Soundtrack | August 15, 1995 | 68:28 | TVT Records |
| Mortal Kombat: Original Motion Picture Score | October 11, 1995 | 42:01 | Rykodisc |
| Mortal Kombat: More Kombat | November 5, 1996 | 67:10 | TVT Records |
| Mortal Kombat Annihilation – Original Motion Picture Soundtrack | October 28, 1997 | 79:11 | TVT Records |
| Mortal Kombat Musik: MK3 & MK4 Arcade Video Game Soundtrack | 1997 | 66:52 | Midway |
| Mortal Kombat: Songs Inspired by the Warriors | April 5, 2011 | 55:25 | Watertower Music |
| Mortal Kombat: Original Motion Picture Soundtrack | April 16, 2021 | 1:20:00 | Watertower Music |

== Collectible card games ==
| Game | Details |
|---|---|
| Mortal Kombat Kard Game 1995 – Collectible card game | Notes: Collectible card game released by BradyGames. |
| Epic Battles 2005 – Collectible card game | Notes: Collectible card game released by Score Entertainment featuring Mortal Kombat and other fighting game franchises. |
