= Midway Arcade Treasures Deluxe Edition =

2006 video game compilation

- European box art
- Developer(s): Midway; Digital Eclipse; GameStar; Midway Studios San Diego
- Publisher(s): Midway: EU: Zoo Digital Publishing
- Series: Midway Arcade Treasures
- Platform(s): Windows
- Release: NA: February 15, 2006; PAL: March 17, 2006
- Genre(s): Various
- Mode(s): Single-player, multiplayer

Midway Arcade Treasures Deluxe Edition is a video game compilation released exclusively for Microsoft Windows on February 15, 2006 in North America, and on March 17 in PAL regions. It is a compilation of Midway Arcade Treasures 2 and Midway Arcade Treasures 3, which had both been previously released on consoles only. Unlike the previous two volumes, it includes the original Mortal Kombat. In the two months after its release, two official patches were released for the collection, one to fix missing music for half of the games that was accidentally left out of the shipped version, and a second one to correct a button function oversight that prevented Random Select and Smoke battle easter eggs in Mortal Kombat II (these were bugs that plagued the console versions of Midway Arcade Treasures 2). A few pieces of additional artwork for Wizard of Wor and Primal Rage were made available as supplements on the Midway website. Like the previous release, the Deluxe Edition's Primal Rage content suffered from emulation issues.

== Games ==
- APB (1987)
- Arch Rivals (1989)
- Badlands (1990)
- Championship Sprint (1986)
- Cyberball 2072 (1988)
- Gauntlet II (1986)
- Hard Drivin' (1989)
- Kozmik Krooz'r (1982)
- Hydro Thunder (1999)
- Mortal Kombat (1992)
- Mortal Kombat II (1993)
- Mortal Kombat 3 (1994)
- Narc (1988)
- Offroad Thunder (2000)
- Pit-Fighter (1990)
- Primal Rage (1994)
- Race Drivin' (1990)
- Rampage World Tour (1997)
- San Francisco Rush 2049 (1999)
- San Francisco Rush the Rock: Alcatraz Edition (1997)
- Spy Hunter II (1987)
- S.T.U.N. Runner (1989)
- Super Off Road (1989) (with Track-Pak)
- Timber (1984)
- Total Carnage (1992)
- Wacko (1983)
- Wizard of Wor (1981)
- Xenophobe (1987)
- Xybots (1987)

== Reception ==
Midway Arcade Treasures Deluxe Edition received mixed to slightly positive reviews, with an average score 70.71% on GameRankings. Major criticisms include the installation procedure as not user-friendly (mostly due to the inclusion of the mandatory additional installation of a third party digital rights management software package for the purpose of copy protection), misleading information about the set being a "Deluxe" set, when in actuality, the Deluxe Edition set is really a repackaged bundle that consists of volumes 2 and 3 of Midway Arcade Treasures in one set, missing audio on most games, for the control setup being a "hassle", "blurry" graphics and emulation issues with Primal Rage.

== See also ==
- Mortal Kombat Arcade Kollection
