= Arctic Thunder =

2000 video game

- US box art for PS2 version
- Developers: Midway Games (Arcade); Inland Productions (PS2, Xbox)
- Publisher: Midway
- Platforms: Arcade; PlayStation 2 Xbox
- Release: 2000: Arcade; NA: November 27, 2000 2004(Ultimate update) PlayStation 2; NA: September 18, 2001; EU: November 2, 2001 Xbox; NA: November 15, 2001; EU: March 22, 2002
- Genre: Racing
- Modes: Single-player, multiplayer
- Arcade system: Quantum3D Graphite

Arctic Thunder is a 2000 snowmobile racing game developed by Midway Games. It was released as an arcade game, Midway's final arcade title, and was also ported to the Sony PlayStation 2 and Xbox consoles, with added content, as a launch title for the latter. In the arcade version of the game, fans built into the cabinet blow cold winds in the player's face during gameplay to simulate the feeling of riding a snowmobile while the seat contains a vibrating shaker motor to simulate engine rumbling. Arctic Thunder is part of Midway's Thunder series, which also included Hydro Thunder, 4 Wheel Thunder, Offroad Thunder, and Hydro Thunder Hurricane. An updated arcade version, titled Ultimate Arctic Thunder, which added some of the content introduced in the home versions, was developed by Play Mechanix and distributed by Betson Enterprises, released sometime in 2004.

The Xbox version of this game is not compatible with the Xbox 360. A Dreamcast port was also planned but was cancelled due to sagging sales of the console. A website was made available before the game's release. As of 2007, the site is no longer active.

== Reception ==
Reception

Aggregate score
Aggregator	Score		
Aggregator	Arcade	PS2	Xbox
Metacritic	N/A	45/100	57/100

Review scores
Publication	Score		
Publication	Arcade	PS2	Xbox
AllGame	3.5/5	1/5	2.5/5
Electronic Gaming Monthly	N/A	2.67/10 (Note: Two critics of Electronic Gaming Monthly gave the PlayStation 2 version each a score of 3/10, and the other gave it 2/10.)	N/A
EP Daily	N/A	4/10	N/A
Game Informer	N/A	5/10	5/10
GameRevolution	N/A	D+	C+
GameSpot	N/A	3.6/10	4/10
GameSpy	N/A	67%	84%
GameZone	N/A	N/A	8.5/10
IGN	N/A	3/10	6/10
Next Generation	N/A	2/5	2/5
Official U.S. PlayStation Magazine	N/A	1/5	N/A
Official Xbox Magazine (US)	N/A	N/A	5.9/10
X-Play	N/A	4/5	N/A

The Xbox version received "mixed" reviews, while the PlayStation 2 version received "generally unfavorable reviews", according to the review aggregation website Metacritic. Jim Preston of NextGen's December 2001 issue said of the latter, "There's plenty of 'Arctic,' but little 'Thunder.' But then, we suppose Snow Snooze wouldn't have been as catchy." The magazine later said in its final issue that the former console version's "only saving grace is that the courses are well enough designed that you rarely get stuck in an alcove or behind a pillar – a frequent, frustrating flaw in racing games. But this doesn't come close to the onscreen mess that makes up most of the gameplay." Tokyo Drifter of GamePro said of the PlayStation 2 version, "At the finish line, Arctic Thunder is moderately enjoyable with good replay value, but its many flaws really hinder what could have been a great romp in the snow." (Note: GamePro gave the PlayStation 2 version 2.5/5 for graphics, two 3/5 scores for sound and fun factor, and 3.5/5 for control.)

AllGame gave the arcade version a score of three-and-a-half stars out of five and said it was "not an unpleasant arcade diversion, and it can be quite entertaining to compete against other players. The levels are clever and distinct, and only the patented Midway cheapness and simplicity will get in the way of your enjoyment."

The PlayStation 2 version was nominated at The Electric Playground's 2001 Blister Awards for (the non-intentional) "Game With the Most Laughs" and "Biggest Disappointment of the Year", but lost both to the PS2 version of Escape from Monkey Island and the Xbox version of Shrek.
