= Hydro Thunder =

1999 video game

- Arcade flyer
- Developers: Midway San Diego; Midway Games West; Eurocom Entertainment Software / Blue Shift (consoles/PC)
- Publisher: Midway
- Director: Steven Ranck
- Programmers: Steven Ranck; Michael Starich; Scott Patterson
- Artist: Eric Browning
- Composer: Orpheus "Soundstation" Hanley
- Platforms: Arcade, Dreamcast, Nintendo 64, PlayStation, Windows
- Release: Arcade; February 1, 1999; Dreamcast: NA: September 9, 1999; EU: October 24, 1999; Nintendo 64, PlayStation: NA: March 6, 2000; EU: May 14, 2000; Windows: EU: 2001
- Genre: Racing
- Modes: Single-player, multiplayer
- Arcade system: Midway Quicksilver II

Hydro Thunder is an arcade inshore powerboat racing video game originally released by Midway Games in February 1999, then as Dreamcast launch title later that year. Versions for the PlayStation and Nintendo 64 were published in early 2000. This game is part of Midway's Thunder series of racing games, which includes Offroad Thunder, 4 Wheel Thunder, and Arctic Thunder.

The Dreamcast version received favorable reviews, while the Nintendo 64 and PlayStation versions received mixed or average reviews, according to the review aggregation website GameRankings. It is include in the 2005 Midway Arcade Treasures 3 compilation for the GameCube, PlayStation 2, and Xbox. Hydro Thunder Hurricane, a sequel to Hydro Thunder, was released for the Xbox 360 on July 27, 2010 on Xbox Live Arcade.

== Gameplay ==
Arcade version showing the boat Banshee racing on the Ship Graveyard track

The gameplay of Hydro Thunder is similar to Sega's Daytona USA. It consists of racing high-tech speedboats through treacherous environments, from the cold seas of the Arctic Circle to a post-apocalyptic version of New York City.

Scattered across the tracks are blue and red boost icons. When touched, these icons allow the player who touched them to boost. Red boost icons are more scarce than blue boost icons because they give more boost fuel. When a player has boost fuel, they may use the boost button to boost, which increases the boat's speed and allows the player to knock other boats into the air, a feature described by the game as the Mighty Hull. Another aspect of boosting is the Hydro Jump, which is performed by braking and using the boost button. When combined with the many ramps on the tracks, players can reach short cuts and boost icons that would otherwise be inaccessible.

The boats in Hydro Thunder are divided into four categories: easy, medium, hard, and bonus. There are three easy, medium, and hard boats and four bonus boats. The easy boats tend to have the easiest handling but do not have the speed of other classes, the hard boats are usually very difficult to control but are very fast, and the medium boats fall in the middle. The bonus boats are a combination of these qualities.

The tracks in Hydro Thunder, like the boats, are divided into four classes: easy, medium, hard, and bonus. The easy tracks are usually short and simple, the hard tracks are dark and difficult to navigate, and the medium tracks fall in the middle. The bonus tracks have a combination of easy and difficult qualities, the longest track being one of them. The arcade version of the game had only two bonus tracks, New York Disaster and Nile Adventure. Hydro Speedway was present as a hidden track. The console versions add two more, Catacomb and Castle Von Dandy, making four in all.

By placing first, second, or third on the easy tracks, the player unlocks the medium tracks and boats. Hard tracks and boats are unlocked by placing first or second on the medium tracks. Bonus tracks are accessed by placing first on the hard tracks, and the bonus boats are then unlocked by placing first on the bonus tracks.

== Development and release ==
The arcade version of Hydro Thunder utilizes the same basic cabinet as Midway's earlier Hyperdrive, and was also sold as a conversion kit for that game. It has the same cabinet seat as Atari's San Francisco Rush. It also has the same steering wheel on the control panel as Cruis'n USA, minus the standard foot pedals, and adds a variable position throttle with forward, neutral and reverse directions. The game also has an unusual volume adjustment, where the regular play volume is usually set lower than the feedback volume for the subwoofer in the seat. This is intended to place the player "in the game" and make the player feel like an actual pilot of a powerful, high-tech speedboat.

In addition to the arcade, Hydro Thunder has been ported over to several home consoles. The PlayStation version of the game includes a career mode not found in the other versions. The Dreamcast version of the game has graphics that are more detailed and closer to the arcade version than the other console versions. The Nintendo 64 version allows up to 4-player local multiplayer (instead of just 2-player) when the Nintendo 64 Expansion Pak is present. A standalone Windows version was released exclusively through budget re-releases in Europe. The Dreamcast port became one of the few Sega All Stars titles. Midway Games had plans to create a double pack for Hydro Thunder and San Francisco Rush 2049 under the name Hydro Rush for the PlayStation 2, but the game was cancelled and the project moved to Midway Arcade Treasures 3 (a compilation of Midway's many racing games) for GameCube, PlayStation 2, and Xbox, and was also included in the later Midway Arcade Treasures Deluxe Edition for Windows - neither of these versions were based on the arcade original, but rather the Dreamcast port.

== Reception ==
Reception

Aggregate score
Aggregator	Score				
Aggregator	Arcade	Dreamcast	N64	PC	PS
GameRankings	N/A	79%	66%	N/A	64%

Review scores
Publication	Score				
Publication	Arcade	Dreamcast	N64	PC	PS
AllGame	4.5/5	4/5	3/5	N/A	3/5
CNET Gamecenter	N/A	8/10	6/10	N/A	3/10
Electronic Gaming Monthly	N/A	7.5/10 (Note: Two critics of Electronic Gaming Monthly gave the Dreamcast version each a score of 7.5/10, one gave it 8/10, and the other gave it 7/10.)	7/10	N/A	N/A
EP Daily	N/A	6.5/10	6.5/10	N/A	7/10
Game Informer	N/A	8/10	7.5/10	N/A	7.75/10
GameFan	N/A	(T.R.) 95% 86% (Note: In GameFan's viewpoint of the Dreamcast version, three critics gave it each a score of 90, 81, and 88.)	73% (Note: In GameFan's viewpoint of the Nintendo 64 version, three critics gave it each a score of 75, 70, and 73.)	N/A	N/A
GameRevolution	N/A	B	N/A	N/A	N/A
GameSpot	N/A	7.9/10	5.6/10	N/A	6.2/10
GameSpy	N/A	8/10	N/A	N/A	N/A
IGN	N/A	8.7/10	7/10	N/A	7.3/10
Next Generation	4/5	4/5	(Mar.) 4/5 (Feb.) 3/5	N/A	N/A
Nintendo Power	N/A	N/A	7.7/10	N/A	N/A
Official U.S. PlayStation Magazine	N/A	N/A	N/A	N/A	2/5
PC Gamer (UK)	N/A	N/A	N/A	54%	N/A
The Cincinnati Enquirer	N/A	3.5/4	N/A	N/A	N/A

The Dreamcast version received favorable reviews, while the Nintendo 64 and PlayStation versions received mixed or average reviews, according to the review aggregation website GameRankings. GameSpot gave the Dreamcast version a positive review, over a week before its U.S. release date.

An unnamed reviewer of Next Generation said of the arcade version in its July 1999 issue, "Boat-racing games have never been very popular, perhaps because it's hard to tune the control just right and keep the excitement as high as in a land-based game. Now, with Hydro Thunder, Midway has finally created the boat-racing game that will bring this sub-genre to the forefront." Three issues later, Jeff Lundrigan of the same magazine (now labeled NextGen) said that "the Dreamcast version is just shy of being a perfect conversion." Eric Bratcher later gave the Nintendo 64 version two separate reviews, first saying in its February 2000 issue, "Even without two-player, this is still a really fun game, though still a bit, um, shallow"; an issue later, however, he said that the same console version was "not as pretty as the Dreamcast version, but if you own an N64, you need this game."

Game Informer praised the PlayStation port being as well done as the original Dreamcast version and gave praise for the decent frame rate for the two player mode and noting where other racing PlayStation games lack.

Dan Elektro of GamePro's October 1999 issue said of the Dreamcast version: "With killer visuals, good physics, and addictive gameplay, Hydro Thunder will help anchor the Dreamcast on its maiden voyage. However, two-player showdowns become two-player slowdowns, and after racing alone for a while, you'll plateau in your quest to beat your best time – and that reduces the replay value. Still, Hydro Thunder swims more than it sinks, and is at least a renter for all race fans." (Note: GamePro gave the Dreamcast version three 4.5/5 scores for graphics, sound, and control, and 4/5 for fun factor.) Six issues later, however, Lamchop said of the Nintendo 64 version, "Like the Titanic, Hydro Thunder takes to the water well-equipped, but slow gameplay is the iceberg that sinks it. You may still want to rent HT to test the waters, but consider yourself warned." (Note: GamePro gave the Nintendo 64 version 4.5/5 for graphics, two 4/5 scores for sound and control, and 3/5 for fun factor.) An issue later, Jake The Snake said of the PlayStation version, "If you like arcade-style racers and want a break from automobiles, don't miss the boat on Hydro Thunder." (Note: GamePro gave the PlayStation version two 4/5 scores for graphics and fun factor, and two 4.5/5 scores for sound and control.)

Cam Shea of Hyper gave the Dreamcast version 84% in its January 2000 issue, saying, "After playing the arcade version, it has to be said that Hydro Thunder is a very faithful port. Graphically this is a good thing, but in terms of replay value, the Dreamcast version suffers for its arcade heritage. It may come packing all the graphics, boats and courses, but it's very much a no frills port that ultimately has a similar replay value to the original." Five issues later, however, Arthur Adam gave the Nintendo 64 version 72%, saying that it "doesn't give the impression of speed to make it a worthwhile racer, feeling more like a gentle ride up an escalator being powered by monkeys pulling a rope." Edge gave the Dreamcast version six out of ten, calling it "mad nautical gaming – aggressive, surreal and compulsive. Sometimes shallow, it is not Mario Kart on water, more a damp Driver – full of noticeable flaws, but a lot of fun."

== Legacy ==
Midway had plans to create a sequel for Hydro Thunder; however, the project was soon cancelled and never recreated, though it did result in the formation of the Thunder sub-series including Offroad Thunder and Arctic Thunder. A spiritual successor to Hydro Thunder, titled H2Overdrive, was developed by Raw Thrills with the assistance of the former Midway San Diego members who worked on the original arcade version of Hydro Thunder, released in May 2009. A sequel titled Hydro Thunder Hurricane was released for Xbox Live Arcade. Microsoft had bought the rights to the series after Midway was acquired by Warner Bros. It was released on July 28, 2010.
