= Midway Arcade Treasures 2 =

2004 video game compilation

- North American PlayStation 2 box art
- Developer: Digital Eclipse
- Publisher: Midway
- Series: Midway Arcade Treasures
- Platforms: PlayStation 2, Xbox, GameCube
- Release: PlayStation 2, Xbox: NA: October 11, 2004; EU: October 29, 2004; AU: November 4, 2004; GameCube: NA: October 11, 2004
- Genre: Various
- Modes: Single-player, multiplayer

Midway Arcade Treasures 2 is the second video game compilation of classic arcade games published by Midway for the PlayStation 2, Xbox (not compatible with Xbox 360), and GameCube. This compilation includes 20 games that were not in the 2003 release of Midway Arcade Treasures. Unlike the previous game, it was rated M for Mature instead of T for Teen by the ESRB.

The game plays similar on all three consoles, though the Xbox version has the exclusive ability to upload scores to an online scoreboard to Xbox Live. In line with other online-enabled games on the Xbox, online support was available to players until April 15, 2010. Midway Arcade Treasures 2 is now supported online again on the replacement Xbox Live servers called Insignia.

The Xbox version is not compatible with the Xbox 360. The special features on each version of the game are the same. These include game histories, developer interviews, and other documents.

== Games ==
The collection consists of the following 20 arcade games:

- A.P.B. (1987)
- Arch Rivals (1989)
- Championship Sprint (1986)
- Cyberball 2072 (1988)
- Gauntlet II (1986)
- Hard Drivin' (1989)
- Kozmik Krooz'r (1982)
- Mortal Kombat II (1993)
- Mortal Kombat 3 (1995)
- NARC (1988)
- Pit-Fighter (1990)
- Primal Rage (1994)
- Rampage World Tour (1997)
- Spy Hunter II (1987)
- Timber (1984)
- Total Carnage (1992)
- Wacko (1983)
- Wizard of Wor (1981)
- Xenophobe (1987)
- Xybots (1987)

This collection is the only arcade classics compilation title on sixth-generation consoles to be rated M by the ESRB, largely because of Mortal Kombat II and 3, and NARC. With all the other games, the compilation would have received a rating of a T (for teen) or lower. Primal Rage was rated T by the ESRB when it was previously ported onto fourth- and fifth-generation consoles. Rampage World Tour is also featured as a bonus game in Rampage Total Destruction on GameCube and Wii, which is rated E10+ by the ESRB.

The compilation was planned to include all three titles, S.T.U.N. Runner, Steel Talons and the original Mortal Kombat. Mortal Kombat was instead moved to the extras disc in the limited-edition version of Mortal Kombat: Deception, while the other two games were omitted entirely because of developmental problems. Kozmik Krooz'r and Wacko were added instead.

The first Mortal Kombat later appeared in other compilations from the Midway Arcade Treasures series: Extended Play for the PSP, and Deluxe Edition for the PC; while S.T.U.N. Runner appeared in Midway Arcade Treasures 3.

== Reception ==
Reception

Aggregate scores
Aggregator	Score
GameRankings	73%
Metacritic	74%

Review scores
Publication	Score
1Up.com	B-
Electronic Gaming Monthly	7 out of 10
Game Informer	9 out of 10
GameSpot	7.2 out of 10
IGN	7.8 out of 10
Official Xbox Magazine (US)	7.5/10
Play	75 out of 100
TeamXbox	9 out of 10

Midway Arcade Treasures 2 was given average to favorable reviews from game critics. On the review aggregator GameRankings, the compilation has an average score of 73%, while the average score is 74 out of 100 on Metacritic. Criticisms are the weaker selection of titles when compared to the previous volume, minor and major emulation glitches, the omission of the original Mortal Kombat and for some of the interviews and documentaries for being grainy and unrestored. GameSpot also criticized the inclusion of the original Mortal Kombat 3, as opposed to the superior Ultimate Mortal Kombat 3.

Due to button mapping issues with the start button, in Mortal Kombat II random character select (Up+Start) cannot be used and Smoke (Down+Start at the Portal stage while getting a Dan Forden shouting out the: "Toasty!" message) cannot be fought.
