= Badlands (1990 video game) =

1989 arcade game

- Arcade flyer
- Developers: Atari Games; Teque (ports)
- Publishers: Atari Games; Domark (ports)
- Designer: Kelly Turner
- Programmers: Kelly Turner; Norm Avellar
- Artists: Kris Moser; Sam Comstock; Bridget Erdmann
- Composers: John Paul; Brad Fuller; Matt Furniss (ports)
- Platforms: Arcade, Amiga, Amstrad CPC, Atari ST, Commodore 64, ZX Spectrum
- Release: Arcade: NA/EU: January 1990; Home computers: UK: 1990
- Genres: Racing, vehicular combat
- Modes: Single-player, multiplayer

Badlands is a 1990 arcade video game published by Atari Games. It was ported by Domark under the Tengen label to the Amiga, Amstrad CPC, Atari ST, Commodore 64, and ZX Spectrum. The game is a re-themed version of Atari's previous racing games Super Sprint and Championship Sprint with the addition of vehicular combat. It is set in the aftermath of a nuclear war, and has three gun-equipped cars race around abandoned, hazardous wastelands to win prizes.

== Gameplay ==
Arcade screenshot

Badlands pits three cars against each other in a three lap race around a small, single-screen circuit. Bonuses are present in the form of wrenches which can be traded for goods such as extra speed, extra acceleration or better tires.

Unlike the Sprint games, Badlands expands upon the formula, taking place in a post-apocalyptic environment and equipping each of the players with cannons. In reality, the cannons do little except to slow cars down by repeatedly shooting at them, but the shop between levels offers the possibility of arming the car with missiles which will destroy the target car, placing it at a severe disadvantage as a replacement is brought onto the track, taking a few seconds.

The tracks also featured a number of new obstacles, including mines and retractable barricades.

== Reception ==
Response to the Spectrum version was mixed. Your Sinclair and CRASH awarded average marks, both claiming in reviews of the original and rerelease that the title's contemporary Super Off-Road was superior. Sinclair User expressed more enthusiasm for the game, but made the same comparison to Super Off-Road.

== Legacy ==
The game was re-released in 2005 as part of Midway Arcade Treasures 3 for the PlayStation 2, GameCube and Xbox. It was also re-released in 2006 as part of Midway Arcade Treasures Deluxe Edition for Microsoft Windows.
