= Offroad Thunder =

1999 video game

- Arcade flyer
- Developer: Midway Studios San Diego
- Publisher: Midway Games
- Platform: Arcade
- Release: NA: January 2000
- Genre: Racing
- Mode: Single-player
- Arcade system: Midway Quicksilver II

Offroad Thunder is an offroad racing arcade game released in January 2000. It forms part of Midway's "Thunder" series of racing games, which also includes Hydro Thunder, 4 Wheel Thunder, and Arctic Thunder and is itself an evolution of Off Road Challenge.

Offroad Thunder was included in Midway Arcade Treasures 3 for Xbox, PlayStation 2 and GameCube.

== Gameplay ==
- Demolition - Running into other cars without getting caught. If so, the game will be over.
- Rally - Racing and catching canisters of nitros (Blue - +3, Red - +5). Players will be required to get first place to earn a free race as a reward.
- Snag The Flag - Players must win the game with the flag. When an opponent overtakes the player, the player loses the flag to the opponent. There are 4 opponents in this mode.
