= Pit-Fighter =

1990 video game

- North American arcade flyer
- Developer: Atari Games (Note: Home computer versions developed by Oxford Mobius; Genesis/Mega Drive version developed by Sterling Silver Software; SNES version developed by Eastridge Technology; Master System version developed by The Kremlin.)
- Publishers: Atari Games: Arcade; NA/EU: Atari Games; JP: Konami Home computers Domark Tengen Genesis/Mega Drive Tengen Super NES and Game Boy THQ Master System Domark
- Designers: Gary Stark; Mark Stephen Pierce
- Programmers: Gary Stark; Paul Kwinn
- Artist: Rob Rowe
- Composer: John Paul: Genesis/Mega Drive Earl Vickers Super NES Nick Eastridge
- Platform: Arcade: Amiga, Amstrad CPC, Atari ST, Commodore 64, MS-DOS, ZX Spectrum, Genesis/Mega Drive, Super NES, Game Boy, Master System, Atari Lynx
- Release: August 1990: Arcade; NA: August 1990; JP: November 1990 Amiga, Atari ST, C64, CPC; UK: November 1991 Genesis/Mega Drive; NA: November 1991; JP: March 27, 1992; EU: April 1992 MS-DOS; UK: November 1991; NA: 1991 Super NES; NA: March 1992; PAL: 1992 Game Boy; NA: June 1992; EU: 1992 Lynx; NA: November 1992; EU: 1992 Master System; PAL: December 1992
- Genre: Fighting
- Modes: Single-player, multiplayer
- Arcade system: Atari G1 Hardware

Pit-Fighter is a 1990 fighting game developed and published by Atari Games for arcades. The Japanese release was published by Konami. Home versions were published by Tengen.

The game uses digitized live actors captured through a bluescreen process, where the various poses and moves were performed by actors in front of a video camera. The game's on-screen character animation is replays of the actual footage, not a rotoscoped (redrawn) animation. Pit-Fighter is the second fighting game to use digitized sprites, after Home Data's Reikai Dōshi: Chinese Exorcist.

== Gameplay ==
The gameplay is similar to Taito's Violence Fight and SNK's Street Smart. The player must punch and kick their opponents until their energy runs out. If the player presses all three of the buttons at once, the character will perform a "super move". The player begins by choosing one of the three playable characters, who each have different moves, speeds, and powers. Up to three people can play at a time, but there will be extra opponents to fight during any of the game's 15 different matches.

Every third fight is a bonus round known as a "Grudge Match". In a Grudge Match, the player must fight against a CPU controlled clone of the fighter if playing alone, or against the other players in a multiplayer game. Getting knocked down three times eliminates a player from the Grudge Match; the winner is the last one standing. Losing the Grudge Match does not eliminate a player, but the winner gets bonus money.

The final battle, the "Championship Match", is between the player and the mysterious entity that taunts between matches periodically, the Masked Warrior. If more than one person is playing the game before this match, they must fight each other to the death until only one becomes victorious and can fight him.

The crowd can interfere by attacking, dropping usable weapons, or pushing a stray player back into the fight. The "power pill" power-up makes the player temporarily stronger and take less damage from hits.

=== Characters ===
Pit-Fighter features three playable fighters:

- Buzz (Bill Chase): An ex professional wrestler.
- Ty (Marc Williams): A kickboxing champion.
- Kato (Glenn Fratticelli): A 3rd degree black belt.

There are eight main unplayable opponents. Several of these characters share the names of the actors who played them: Executioner (John Aguire), Southside Jim (James Thompson), Angel (Angela Stellato), C.C. Rider (Rich Vargas), Mad Miles (Miles McGowan), Heavy Metal (Kim Rhodes), Chainman Eddie (Eddie Venancio) and Masked Warrior (Bill McAleenan). Other non-playable characters include: Knife Woman (Dianne Bertucci), Knife Man (Milt Loper), Finale Woman (Tina Scyrater), Finale Woman (Maria Lenytzkyj), Big Kid In The Crowd (Gabriel Koura) and Crowd (Rob Rowe).

== Releases ==
In 1991, versions of the game were released for the Super NES, Mega Drive/Genesis, Master System, Amiga, Amstrad CPC, Atari ST, Commodore 64, MS-DOS, and ZX Spectrum. The Spectrum version was released as part of the Super Fighter compilation with Final Fight and WWF WrestleMania. The Super NES version lacks the interactive audience, weapons, and three characters: Southside Jim, Heavy Metal, and Mad Miles.

Handheld versions were released for the Atari Lynx and the Game Boy in 1992. Tiger Electronics released its own dedicated handheld version.

An emulated version of the arcade game is included in 2004's Midway Arcade Treasures 2 for GameCube, PlayStation 2, and Xbox, and in Midway Arcade Treasures Deluxe Edition (2006) for Microsoft Windows. This version runs at a faster speed than the arcade original. Pit-Fighter is in the 2012 compilation Midway Arcade Origins.

== Reception ==
Reception

Review scores
Publication	Score	
Publication	Arcade	Sega Genesis
Computer and Video Games	90%	N/A
MegaTech	N/A	80%

Atari sold 5,500 arcade units in the U.S. and 1,000 in Ireland. In North America, it was the top-grossing upright arcade cabinet on the RePlay arcade charts in October 1990, and weekly coin drop earnings averaged $413.75 per arcade unit during November to December 1990. In Japan, Game Machine listed Pit-Fighter as the seventh most successful table arcade unit of December 1990.

Julian Rignall of Computer and Video Games rated the arcade version 90%, calling it a "thoroughly enjoyable beat 'em up which really packs a punch" and "one of the most enjoyable arcade fighting games in a long time". Zzap!64 gave the game a more negative review, dubbing it an "anticlimactic beat'em up" and writing that the attract mode was the best part of the game. They criticized the limited frames of animation and compared it unfavorably to The Combatribes and Final Fight.

David Wilson of Computer Gaming World approved of the Amiga version, stating that it "is the arcade game teleported", and concluded that the game "offers the two-player option missing in many fighter games and enough roughhousing to suit the most violent gamer".

George and Rob reviewed the Super NES version in Nintendo Power. George commented that game was "extremely difficult to control" and that Rob commented on the graphics using digitized people, stating, "it doesn't matter if it uses new technology or not. The question is 'is the game fun?' and I think the answer in this case is 'no'." Rob and George rated Graphics and Sound with 2.5, Control with 2, Challenge with 2 and Theme and Fun with 2.5.

MegaTech magazine gave the Mega Drive version an 80% score. Mega placed the Mega Drive version at #27 in its Top Mega Drive Games of All Time.

In February 1993, Your Sinclair gave the ZX Spectrum version a 28% score.

== Legacy ==
Electronic Gaming Monthly and GamePro had previews of a planned sequel named Pit Fighter II by Tengen, which the former magazine claimed was more than 75% finished and would be released for Sega Genesis in the fourth quarter of 1993.

Kato, Buzz, and Ty were returning along with three new selectable fighters: Connor (Karate Champion), Tanya (Roller Queen), and Chief (Ex-bodyguard). Those are also three of the playable characters ultimately featured in Atari's subsequent game, Guardians of the 'Hood. Pictures show two CPU fighters, Helga (level 1) and Jay-Jay (level 2).
