= Hyperdrive (video game) =

1998 racing arcade game

- Developer: Midway
- Publisher: Midway
- Platform: Arcade
- Release: NA: June 23, 1998
- Genre: Racing
- Modes: Single-player, multiplayer
- Arcade system: Midway Seattle

Hyperdrive is a futuristic racing video game made by Midway Games and released in arcades in 1998.

== Gameplay ==
Players race high-tech ships through race tracks stationed in outer space. The lower the ships hover in relation to the track, the faster they go. Ships can also pass other racers by flying above or below them.

There are three tracks to race on and four different ships available.

== Development ==
Hyperdrive uses the same 3Dfx Voodoo1-based board as Midway's earlier game NFL Blitz, but with a faster processor.

The arcade version of the 1999 game Hydro Thunder utilizes the same basic cabinet as Hyperdrive.
