= Primal Rage =

1994 video game

- North American arcade flyer
- Developer: Atari Games (Note: Game Boy, Game Gear, Genesis, 32X, 3DO, PlayStation, Jaguar CD, Amiga, and Saturn versions developed by Probe Entertainment; SNES version developed by Bitmasters; and MS-DOS version developed by Teeny Weeny Games.)
- Publisher: Atari Games; Time Warner Interactive: Arcade Atari Games Time Warner Interactive (Note: Arcade version in Japan published/marketed by Atlus.) Game Boy, Game Gear, Genesis/Mega Drive, MS-DOS, PlayStation, Jaguar CD, Saturn, SNES Time Warner Interactive 32X Sega 3DO LG Electronics
- Producers: Dennis Harper; J. Cameron Petty; Mark Stephen Pierce
- Designers: Frank Kuan; J. Cameron Petty
- Programmers: Dennis Harper; Frank Kuan
- Artists: Jason Leong; Pete Kleinow
- Composer: Jeanne Parson
- Platform: Arcade: Game Boy, Game Gear, Genesis/Mega Drive, MS-DOS, Super NES, 32X, 3DO, PlayStation, Atari Jaguar CD, Amiga, Sega Saturn
- Release: August 1994: Arcade; NA: August 1994 Game Boy, Game Gear, Genesis/Mega Drive, SNES; NA/PAL: August 25, 1995 32X; NA: November 14, 1995; EU: March 1996 3DO, PlayStation; NA/PAL: November 14, 1995 Jaguar CD; NA: December 21, 1995; EU: December 1995 Amiga; EU: December 1995 Saturn; NA: June 14, 1996; EU: August 1996
- Genre: Fighting
- Modes: Single-player, multiplayer
- Arcade system: Atari GT

Primal Rage is a 1994 fighting game developed by Atari Games and released by Time Warner Interactive for arcades. Set on a post-apocalyptic version of Earth called "Urth", it has players control one of seven prehistoric beasts that battle each other to determine the planet's fate. Matches feature many of the conventions of fighting games from the era, including special moves and gory finishing maneuvers. Ports were released for home video game consoles and personal computers. Efforts to perfectly emulate the arcade original have been unsuccessful due to the use of an unusual copy protection method. Toys, comics, a novel and other merchandise tie-ins were produced. More than 1.5 million copies of the game were sold.

== Gameplay ==
Arcade version screenshot, showcasing a match between Sauron and Armadon

Primal Rage is a 2D fighting game in which two players select characters to battle each other in one-on-one combat, or a single player is faced with a campaign of fights against CPU opponents of increasing difficulty. The final battle of the single-player mode (accessible only at difficulty level 10 or higher) consists of fighting all the other monsters, this time with an increased power bar, made available in a minigame prior to the fight. A total of seven fighters are playable: Blizzard, the ape-like god of good; Armadon, the ceratopian/thyreophoran-like god of life; Talon, the raptor-like god of survival; Sauron, the tyrannosaur-like god of hunger; Chaos, the ape-like god of decay; Vertigo, the cobra-like goddess of insanity; and Diablo, the tyrannosaur-like god of evil. Each character has its own specialized set of three attack moves and abilities. The object is to deplete the opposing character's health meter before the player's own runs out. There are also seven different background stages where fighting takes place, each one representing one of the character's innate domains: the Cliff (Blizzard), the Hollows (Armadon), the Strip (Talon), the Cove (Sauron), the Ruins (Chaos), the Tomb (Vertigo) and the Inferno (Diablo).

During fights, human tribesmen wander nearby and worship the creatures as gods. This allows for the creatures to toss them around or devour some to regain health (eating opponents' worshipers adds a bonus to one's score, while eating one's own will penalize the player). Prior to the final battle, a minigame commences in which the player is given the chance to eat as many worshipers as possible to increase health for the endurance round. Two human-controlled characters can trigger easter egg minigames of human volleyball and bowling.

Unlike most fighting games, where the special moves are performed by moving the joystick followed by pressing one or more buttons, Primal Rage features a system where the player holds down certain buttons, then performs the joystick movements. Later revisions of the arcade game added the ability to perform special moves in the more traditional way, with motion followed by button presses, but kept the original method as well. After the opponent is defeated, a brief moment is allowed for the player to perform a finishing move to end the match in a more dramatic fashion; these are performed in a similar manner to the special moves. Although all characters feature three finishing moves, some of them tend to the humorous side, such as Vertigo's "La Vache Qui Rit" (French for "the laughing cow"), a fatality in which Vertigo transforms her opponent into a cow, which moos and runs away.

== Plot ==
A massive meteor strike has devastated Earth. Human civilization comes to an end in the ensuing cataclysms and humanity regresses into tribes of Stone Age dwellers. A primordial rainforest covers the land and the continental landmass has shifted into the shape of a fire-breathing dinosaur skull. The planet is now primitively referred to as "Urth" by the survivors of the cataclysms.

Seven fearsome creatures with supernatural abilities emerge from their slumber deep within the Urth's crust, and become worshiped as gods by the humans, who form segregated clans beneath the ones they follow. The beasts themselves are divided between those who wish to keep peace on Urth, and those who attempt to plunge the world into further chaos for their own benefit.

== Development ==
Animator Jason Leong recounted: "Every year [Time Warner Interactive] throws a brain-storming session where everybody brings up new game ideas. A few years ago I brought up the concept of a head-to-head dinosaur fighting game, which coincidentally someone else also brought up, but their idea was just two T. Rexes fighting. My original write-up included ideas that finally appeared in the game, such as different species of quickly moving dinosaurs and the concept of the dinosaurs being gods."

The game's graphics were produced via claymation. Development began with a series of production sketches of the fighters drawn by Leong. Using these drawings as a basis, model maker Dan Platt crafted clay model figures of the fighters, for which flexible metal armatures were then cast. The models were airbrushed according to Leong's drawings. The models were filmed through the process of stop motion animation, with about 400 frames shot for each fighter. Production coordinator Stephen Riesenberger says the game was designed to be accessible to novices, with its four-button controls being less daunting than the standard six-button layout, and unusual special move inputs making it easier to perform the attacks by button mashing.

== Release ==
Primal Rage was released for arcades by Time Warner Interactive in August 1994, with two arcade cabinet variants: a standard 25" cabinet and a deluxe 33" cabinet. Commercial ports of the title include: 3DO Interactive Multiplayer, 32X, Amiga, Atari Jaguar CD, Game Boy, Game Gear, MS-DOS, PlayStation, Sega Genesis, Sega Saturn and Super Nintendo Entertainment System. To promote the home versions, Time Warner Interactive hosted a "National Primal Rage Video Game Tournament" at Six Flags Over Texas in October 1995. A Mac OS port was also planned to be published on November 14, 1995, and advertised in Macworld's January 1996 issue. However, development on the conversion was cancelled in April of the same year.

Primal Rage was ported to the Game Boy by Probe Software and released in North America and Europe on August 25, 1995. This port excludes Vertigo from the roster and features a reduced moveset for every character and downgraded visuals. The Game Gear port is similar to the Game Boy release but with color graphics, much of the blood and gore retained, and the "urination" fatality intact. This port has smaller sprites, less vibrant colors, and a cheat code that replaces Diablo's followers with Fergus McGovern, former CEO and founder of Probe Software. Prior to launch, a limited version was available for Sega Channel subscribers and a different version was released through the service on August 26, 1995, with twenty-four percent of subscribers taking part in the event to receive an 800 number and win prizes. The SNES port, developed by Bitmasters and released in both North America and Europe on August 25, 1995, has more detailed visuals compared to the Genesis release; however, Chaos's golden shower fatality was censored. The MS-DOS port, developed by Teeny Weeny Games, features a special setup for keyboard setups and runs at a low resolution.

Primal Rage was ported to the 3DO and published by LG Electronics in North America and Europe on November 14, 1995, featuring a pre-rendered introduction full-motion video sequence and smaller sprites compared to previous releases. The 32X port was developed by Probe Entertainment and first published in North America on November 14, 1995, and in Europe in March 1996. It is based on the Genesis release but features more arcade-accurate visuals. The Jaguar CD port is similar to the 3DO release, although it lacks the full-motion video introduction and has shorter loading times. The PlayStation port was released in North America and Europe on November 14, 1995, and in Japan on December 13, 1996. It features long loading times and fewer frames of animation for each character than the arcade version. The Amiga port was released only in Europe in December 1995, with visuals similar to the Genesis release. Although marketed as an Amiga 1200 release, this port is compatible with any Amiga computer with at least 2MB of RAM.

The Saturn port was released in North America in June 1996, in Europe in August 1996, and in Japan by GameBank on March 26, 1998, featuring more colors, larger sprites, and pre-rendered full motion video sequences for each character in single-player mode. The Saturn version of Primal Rage was the last version to be released. Senior producer Ken Humphries explained, "To be honest, the Saturn version got lost in the shuffle. In the process of trying to get other versions done, the Saturn version was the one they ended up pulling resources from." To allow the Saturn version to run at a solid frame rate, it was made to run at 30 Hz instead of the usual 60 Hz. According to Humphries, it was easier to make the Saturn hardware approximate the size of the arcade version's sprites than it was with other conversions of the game.

A few console ports were based on version 1.7 of the arcade game, while most ports were based on version 2.3, a largely revised update to the Arcade game. Features of version 2.3 include modified special inputs, gameplay changes, balance changes, and additional content, such as one additional finisher per character, among many others.

A version based on arcade version 2.3 was included as part of Midway Arcade Treasures 2 for GameCube, PlayStation 2 and Xbox in 2004, later being included as part of Midway Arcade Treasures Deluxe Edition for the PC in 2006.

There is also an R-Zone version that plays the same as a Tiger Handheld variation of the game. It features Blizzard, Chaos, Talon, Sauron, Vertigo, and Diablo as playable characters, and Armadon serves as the final boss.

== Reception ==
Reception

Review scores
Publication	Score
AllGame	2.5/5 (SAT); 2/5 (JCD)
Amiga Power	77% (AGA)
Famitsu	19/40 (SAT)
GameFan	248/300 (32X); 235/300 (PS1); 197/300 (SAT)
HobbyConsolas	91/100 (SNES, 32X)
IGN	5.0/10 (32X); 4.0/10 (PS1)
Jeuxvideo.com	12/20 (SNES)
M! Games	68% (GEN); 59% (SNES); 68%
Mean Machines Sega	90/100 (GG); 83/100 (GEN); 80/100 (32X); 79/100 (SAT)
Mega Fun	57% (GB); 63% (GG); 74% (GEN); 70% (SNES); 71% (PS1, SAT)
Next Generation	2/5 (3DO, GEN, SNES)
PC Gamer (US)	90% (DOS)
VideoGames & Computer Entertainment	7/10 (GB, GG, GEN); 5/10 (PS1); 6/10 (SAT)
Sega Power	91% (GEN); 79% (32X)
Sega Pro	82% (GG); 79% (GEN)
Sega Saturn Magazine	60% (SAT)

Primal Rage was a major commercial success, although Atari Games derived more profit from its merchandising than from the game itself. RePlay reported the game to be the third most popular deluxe arcade game at the time. Play Meter also listed the title to be the fourth most popular arcade game at the time. Next Generation reviewed the original arcade version, stating, "All in all, an excellent show of graphics and sound design tarnished by unbalanced gameplay." AllGame's Brad Cook praised the arcade version's visuals, sound, gameplay, and replay value, stating that "This is a fun game and a good value at 25 cents per play with 25 cents to continue." It was nominated for the Video Software Dealers Association's "Video Game of the Year" for 1995, losing to Donkey Kong Country 2: Diddy's Kong Quest.

GamePro gave the Game Boy and Game Gear versions rave reviews, particularly applauding the graphics and the large selection of easy-to-execute special moves. They added that "There haven't been Game Gear graphics like these since MK II's debut," and expressed astonishment at the absence of slowdown in the Game Boy version. Likewise, VideoGames's Gabe Soria commended both the Game Boy and Game Gear versions. Mega Fun's Stephan Girlich and Ulf Schneider commended the visuals but criticized the sound design. Mean Machines Sega gave the Game Gear version a positive outlook, but one reviewer remarked that the game does not translate as well as the Genesis version. Sega Pro's Steve Hardy praised the visuals but criticized the complex controls due to the Game Gear's limited number of buttons.

GamePro gave more mixed reviews to the Genesis and Super NES versions, criticizing that the sprites are too small and the graphics in general are unimpressive, especially in the Genesis version. The Genesis version's reviewer complained that the controls are a straight translation of the arcade version's four-button control, making special moves needlessly awkward to execute, while the Super NES version's reviewer said the game was outshone by the Super NES version of Killer Instinct, which came out at the same time. However, they praised the combo system and character design and gave both versions an overall recommendation. VideoGames's Dan Vebber argued that the Genesis version failed to replicate the arcade original. Mega Fun's Girlich and Schneider commended the presentation and sound. Sega Power's Dean Mortlock praised the visuals and replay value, regarding the Genesis version as "Another excellent conversion from Probe. A worthy alternative to current beat-em-ups." MAN!AC's Oliver Ehrle criticized the graphics and sound of the Genesis and Super NES versions. Mean Machines Sega gave the Genesis version a rave review, stating that the game is a "great beat 'em up which may have been beaten to its niche". Next Generation derided the graphics in the Genesis version, saying the sprites have "that flat, fuzzy, pasted-on-the-screen look that just isn't acceptable anymore." The reviewer further argued that the actual play mechanics of Primal Rage are unexceptional, such that without the sharp graphics and sounds of the arcade version the game is not worth playing. Sega Pro's Mat Yeo commended Probe's work on the Genesis version but noted several missing features compared to the arcade original, stating that it fell short of capturing the "frantic fighting action of the coin-op". Mega Fun's Girlich and Schneider praised the SNES version's visuals and sound. Next Generation stated that the SNES version is "so average it hurts to watch, much less play." Hobby Consolas's Sonia Herranz highly praised the gameplay, graphics, and sound design. Jeuxvideo.com's Nuktos praised the presentation, gameplay, and sound but criticized the replay value.

Next Generation found that though the 3DO version accurately recreated the arcade version's graphics and sound, the visuals had become severely dated in the years since it was first released and the gameplay was never very deep to begin with. GamePro similarly said that the 3DO version had the best graphics and sounds of any home version to date, but that "it still won't convert those who never took to the arcade original", though they had an overall more positive impression of the game. Mega Fun's Sandrie Souleiman praised the graphics and sound of the 3DO version but said that the PlayStation version was better. Fun Generation's Philipp Noack and Götz Schmiedehause commended the sound and gameplay of the 3DO version, but both said the visuals were better on the PlayStation version. Likewise, MAN!AC's Oliver Ehrle commended the visuals and sound of the 3DO version but said that the PlayStation version was slightly better.

GameFan praised the visual presentation of the 32X version, though the reviewers criticized the sound and lack of additional gore effects from the arcade original. In the same issue of GamePro which described the 3DO version as the best port of the game, a different reviewer contended that the 32X version is the best one, with graphics comparable to the 3DO version's and controls which are easier than the 3DO's when using the six-button controller. Hobby Consolas praised the sprite's quality and gameplay speed compared to the previous 16-bit versions. Mean Machines Sega gave the 32X version a positive outlook but stated that the game fell short when compared to others in the 32X library. Sega Power's James Ashton regarded the 32X version to be as good as the previous Genesis release but noted that the game "doesn't add much to the monster mash formula." IGN's Levi Buchanan said that the 32X version paled in comparison to the arcade original.

Última Generación's Gonzalo Herrero commended the Jaguar CD version, praising the visuals, sound design, and controls. GamePro assessed the Jaguar CD version as "one of the Jag CD's strongest" games. They criticized the smaller sprites but said the game otherwise did an exemplary job of recreating the graphics and sound of the arcade version, and that the control with the Jaguar ProController is excellent. In contrast, AllGame's Colin Williamson commended the controls but criticized the downgraded visuals compared to the arcade original and loading times, stating that "It's sad that the Jaguar CD suffered such a horrible fate—but with games like this one, it's no big surprise. This is one dino-sized disappointment."

GameFan praised the PlayStation version for being a near-arcade perfect port, and for the addition of a six-button control setup. GamePro declared the PlayStation version the new best, commenting that the control setup is particularly suited to the PlayStation Controller and "The graphics blow away all other versions to date, and even make the arcade version seem tame." However, they found the game less impressive than recent fighting games such as Virtua Fighter 2. VideoGames stated that the PlayStation version was not worth the asking price due to persisting gameplay issues from the arcade original. IGN opined that the PlayStation version paled in comparison to 3-D fighting games on the market.

GamePro and Sega Saturn Magazine both ruled that the Saturn version, though superior to previous versions, was sorely outdated by the time of its release, particularly due to the game's simplistic and repetitive combat. VideoGames noted the Saturn's visuals to be better than the PlayStation version. GameFan, as with the PlayStation version, commended the Saturn release for being a near-arcade perfect port but criticized the full-motion video sequences. Fun Generation's Götz Schmiedehause and Stephan Girlich commended the visuals and sound of the Saturn version. Mega Fun's Sandrie Souleiman praised the visuals but criticized the sound design of the Saturn version. Mean Machines Sega regarded the Saturn version to be a fair conversion of the arcade original. AllGame's Joe Ottoson criticized the Saturn version's visuals and sound design but commended its replay value, stating that "If you can bear the loading times and the unusual system for executing super moves, there's some interesting things to unearth."

=== Controversy ===
In 1996, Ellie Rovella of Gilbert, Arizona, launched a grassroots campaign against the game after her 11-year-old son bought and played the Genesis version of Primal Rage and executed Chaos's urination fatality. The campaign resulted in Best Buy pulling the game from 251 stores nationwide. In response, Primal Rage publisher Time Warner Interactive pointed out that Rovella never complained to Time Warner, instead taking the issue directly to the media, and that the game was clearly rated "T" for Teen and so should not have been purchased by her 11-year-old son in the first place. They also resubmitted Primal Rage for evaluation by the ESRB, who determined that the game had nothing in it to merit increasing the rating to "M" for mature or "AO" for adults only, and again rated it "T". After this reevaluation, Best Buy put every version of Primal Rage back on the shelves except for the Genesis version, which they said they would only sell if it were rated "M", even though most home versions of the game contain all the same fatalities and gore.

Time Warner PR director Tracy Egan said the publisher was not overly concerned about the Ellie Rovella controversy since Primal Rage, being a two-year-old arcade game, was already past its sales peak by the time Rovella started her campaign. In the United Kingdom, the game's advertisement parodied the controversy by placing gentle scenes over the violent parts and having Simon Bates mock his VSC video warnings.

== Merchandise ==
After an unveiling at the 1996 American International Toy Fair, five inch action figures of the seven Primal Rage characters (each bundled with accessories like lava rocks, armor, and tiny humans) were released in stores. Sirius Entertainment published a 4-issue comic book mini-series based on the game from 1996 to 1998. Issue #1 features color interior art, and the low-run published issues #2–4 feature black-and-white interior art.

== Canceled sequel ==
Primal Rage II
- The game's title screen
- Developer: Atari Games
- Publisher: Atari Games
- Platform: Arcade
- Release: Cancelled
- Genre: Fighting
- Modes: 2 players, playing simultaneously
- Arcade system: Sony ZN-1

By 1995, Atari had begun production of Primal Rage II. Ken Humphries, senior producer of the home versions of the original Primal Rage, said in an early 1996 interview that "Primal Rage 2 should come out in the arcades in September 1996. As soon as they finish that, we'll start working on the consumer versions." However, the game did not get very far into production before being canceled, as Atari said that it wouldn't generate enough sales.

The controls were expanded from a four-button to a six-button configuration. The game was to feature all seven gods from the original plus ten newcomers: a new dinosaur, a boss, and eight humans called the Avatars, that were the gods' surrogates on Urth, with the first game's characters meant to make a comeback as said gods. Necrosan, a boss in the form of a skeletal dragon, once rumored by video game magazine GamePro to be added in an updated release of the original Primal Rage, was to become the main antagonist.

The plot focuses on the years after the first game's timeline. It turns out the meteor that crashed on Urth was actually an egg which hatched a being known as Necrosan. The warriors would be Malyssa Wisteria: Avatar of Vertigo, Arik Maka'i: Avatar of Sauron, Keena Amali: Avatar of Talon, Shank Traff: Avatar of Chaos, Sinjin Von Acheron: Avatar of Diablo, Kaze Koriyama: Avatar of Blizzard, Tor Malachite: Avatar of Armadon, and Xiao Ming Tang Kuan: Avatar of Slash Fang. Slash Fang is a newly introduced Primal God in the form of a Smilodon-type Weretiger.

Although the game never came to be, its story was later adapted into Primal Rage: The Avatars. Also, the characters of Slash Fang and Necrosan were released with the other god characters in the short-lived Primal Rage action figure series.

A test arcade cabinet briefly appeared playable at the Golfland arcades in Milpitas, California, and Sunnyvale, California, and a supposedly finished machine of this was shown at the California Extreme 2001 show. The machine had the original board and most of the original art. In subsequent years, screenshots of the incomplete game were released on the Internet. In December 2012, a YouTube user posted a video of the game, and then in June 2014, it was reported that the game was available for play at Galloping Ghost Arcade in Brookfield, Illinois. With only two boards of the game considered to be in existence, a dump from the game's board had been circulating online for years, but no emulator had been able to run it, until in March 2017 it was revealed that an individual had created a modified version of MAME, named "MAME4RAGE2", making it able to emulate the game. In February 2025 Primal Rage II was promoted to working status in MAME 0.275.

=== Primal Rage: The Avatars ===
The giant ape Blizzard battles the dinosaur Sauron, from issue #4 of the Primal Rage comic published by Sirius Entertainment.

When Primal Rage II was canceled, Atari allegedly deemed it necessary to somehow present the story for the sequel. Thus, in 1997, a novel called Primal Rage: The Avatars, written by John Vornholt, was published by Boulevard Books. The book tells what happened to the dinosaur gods 65 million years ago, and then moves into the main story of the gods' reign on Urth renewed, then the beast Necrosan appears. The book also focuses on fleshing out the world of Primal Rage, and does so by bringing "the Avatars" to the forefront of the story, they being the humans chosen by their respective gods to be their shamans or other titles of nobility.

Details to the backstory of Primal Rage are made clear in The Avatars. The events in Primal Rage take place in the year 1000 AC (After Cataclysm) or about the year 3000 AD by the Gregorian calendar. The battles of the dinosaur and ape gods are referred to as "The Primal Rage". The spell used to imprison the ape and dinosaur gods is called the Bonds of Forbidding. Necrosan the skeletal dragon (who is referred to as Necronus on the introductory page) reactivates the Bonds of Forbidding to entrap the gods.
