= Xybots =

1987 video game

- Arcade flyer
- Developer: Atari Games
- Publisher: Atari Games
- Designer: Ed Logg
- Programmers: Ed Logg; Bob Flanagan
- Artists: Sam Comstock; Mark West
- Composers: Hal Canon; Brad Fuller; Earl Vickers
- Platforms: Arcade, MSX, Amstrad CPC, Atari ST, Commodore 64, Amiga, ZX Spectrum, Atari Lynx
- Release: November 1987: Arcade; NA: November 1987 Amiga, Atari ST, ZX Spectrum; UK: June 1989 CPC; UK: 1989 Lynx; NA: 1991; EU: 1991
- Genre: Third-person shooter
- Modes: Single-player, multiplayer

Xybots is a 1987 third-person shooter video game developed and published by Atari Games for arcades. Players control "Major Rock Hardy" and "Captain Ace Gunn", who must travel through a three-dimensional maze and battle a series of robots known as the Xybots, whose mission is to destroy all mankind. The game features a split screen display showing the gameplay on the bottom half of the screen and information on player status and the current level on the top half.

Designed by Ed Logg, it was originally conceived as a sequel to his previous title, Gauntlet. The game was well received, with reviewers lauding the game's various features, particularly the cooperative multiplayer aspect. Despite this, it was met with limited financial success, which has been attributed to its unique control scheme that involves rotating the joystick to turn the player character. Xybots was ported to various personal computers and the Atari Lynx handheld. Versions for the Nintendo Entertainment System and Sega Genesis/Mega Drive were announced, but never released. Emulated versions of the arcade game were later released as part of various compilations, starting with Midway Arcade Treasures 2 in 2004.

== Gameplay ==
The gameplay area shows the perspectives of both characters in the lower half of the screen, with the top half being split between the player statuses and level map.

One or two players navigate through corridors as either Rock Hardy or Ace Gunn, battling enemy Xybots with a laser gun, seeking cover from enemy fire behind various objects and attempting to reach the level's exit. In certain levels, players face off against a large boss Xybot. Players move using the joystick, which also rotates to turn the player character. The lower half the screen shows the gameplay area for both players while the upper half is split between the map for the current level and the status display for each player. The display shows the player's remaining energy, which can be replenished by collecting energy pods within the levels. Energy can also be purchased at shops between levels, using coins dropped by defeated Xybots. The player can also purchase power-ups at these shops, including extra armor, increased speed, strength and firepower along with maze and enemy maps.

== Development ==
The concept for the game was born out of an attempt by designer Ed Logg and engineer/technician Doug Snyder to create a first-person video game without specialized hardware. In 2005, Logg recalled that he had trouble with the controls for the game—both building controls that worked with the game design and getting players to realize they could rotate the joystick to turn the in-game characters. Because of these difficulties, Logg was unsure if the game would enter mass production. Originally Logg envisioned the game as a second sequel to Gauntlet titled Gauntlet III: Catacombs. However, the marketing department at Atari Games did not want to make another Gauntlet game and made him change the title. Logg and co-programmer Bob Flanagan eventually settled on a theme based on Major Havoc, a previous Atari arcade game.

== Reception ==
Reception

Review scores
Publication	Score
ACE	77% (ZX); 81% (Atari ST); 55% (Amstrad)
Electronic Gaming Monthly	4/10, 6/10, 5/10, 8/10 (Atari Lynx)

Award
Publication	Award
Your Sinclair	Megagame

Upon release, the game was positively reviewed. It drew favorable comparisons to both Berzerk and Gauntlet for its maze-like stages and shooting gameplay. The game's various features, including the cooperative gameplay, were praised, with Computer and Video Games and The Games Machine citing them as aspects that made the game addictive. Commodore User also cited the two-player game as a highlight, saying "its real appeal is as a team game, with you and your mate running about the place, covering each other, dividing up and destroying all the robots in the maze, and lending one another gold coins in the shop."

Ed Logg recalled in 2005 that the game was not a financial success. GamesTM wrote that "Xybots was overlooked in arcades due to its complex controls and tricky gameplay" and that its lack of earnings in arcades was the reason no sequel was ever developed. In retrospect, they wrote that the game was "ahead of its time" and "offered a unique experience that similar games of the era were unable to match."

== Ports ==
In 1989 Xybots was ported to MSX, Commodore 64, Amstrad, ZX Spectrum, Atari ST, and Amiga. In 1991, the Atari Games subsidiary Tengen released a version of the game for the handheld Atari Lynx, developed by the Chicago-based NuFX.

A version for the Sega Genesis by Tengen had been announced at the 1990 Winter Consumer Electronics Show alongside ports of the Atari Games titles Paperboy and Hard Drivin', but while the latter two games were released for the system, Xybots was not. A planned Nintendo Entertainment System port from Tengen also went unreleased.

== Legacy ==
Having acquired the rights to the Atari Games arcade library through its parent company Williams, Midway released the arcade version of Xybots as part of the 2004 console compilation Midway Arcade Treasures 2, as well as Midway Arcade Treasures Deluxe Edition for Microsoft Windows. The arcade version also saw release on the PSP as part of Midway Arcade Treasures Extended Play.

With the dissolution of Midway in 2009, Warner Bros. Interactive Entertainment picked up the rights to Midway's arcade titles, releasing Xybots for the PlayStation 3 and Xbox 360 as part of Midway Arcade Origins and for various other platforms through the Lego Dimensions Midway Arcade Level Pack.
