= Mortal Kombat 3 =

1995 video game

- Cover art for the home versions
- Developer: Midway (Note: Genesis, MS-DOS, and SNES versions developed by Sculptured Software; Game Boy, Game Gear, and Master System versions developed by Software Creations; PlayStation and Windows versions developed by Leland Interactive Media.)
- Publishers: Midway: Game Boy, Genesis/Mega Drive, Super NES; NA: Williams Entertainment; EU: Acclaim Entertainment MS-DOS, Windows GT Interactive PlayStation Sony Computer Entertainment Game Gear Acclaim Entertainment Master System Tec Toy
- Designers: Ed Boon; John Tobias
- Programmer: Ed Boon
- Artists: John Tobias; Steve Beran; Tony Goskie
- Composer: Dan Forden
- Series: Mortal Kombat
- Platform: Arcade: Game Boy, Genesis/Mega Drive, Super NES, MS-DOS, PlayStation, Windows, Game Gear, R-Zone, Master System
- Release: April 15, 1995: Arcade; NA: April 15, 1995 Genesis/Mega Drive, Super NES; NA: October 13, 1995; EU: October 20, 1995 MS-DOS; NA: October 13, 1995; EU: 1995 Game Boy; NA: October 13, 1995; EU: October 1995 PlayStation; NA: October 13, 1995; EU: December 8, 1995 Game Gear; EU: 1995 Master System; BR: 1996 Windows; NA: 1996
- Genre: Fighting
- Modes: Single-player, multiplayer
- Arcade system: Midway Wolf Unit hardware

Mortal Kombat 3 is a 1995 fighting game developed and published by Midway for arcades. It was later ported to several home systems, including the Sega Genesis, Super Nintendo Entertainment System, Game Boy and PlayStation. It is the third main installment in the Mortal Kombat franchise, and a sequel to 1993's Mortal Kombat II. As in the previous games, it has a cast of characters that players choose from and guide through a series of battles against other opponents. The game avoids the tournament storyline of its predecessors, as various warriors instead fight against the returning Shao Kahn, who has resurrected his bride Sindel and started an invasion of Earthrealm.

Mortal Kombat 3 retains the blood and gory attacks that defined the series, and also introduces new types of Fatality finishing moves, including Animalities. Other features new to the series are combos, predefined sequences used to perform a series of consecutive attacks. The new "Run" button allows players to briefly dash toward the opponent, and the new "Kombat Kodes" system allows players to enter various symbols before two-player matches to unlock certain additional features of the game.

Mortal Kombat 3 was a commercial success and received generally positive reviews, but drew criticism for omitting several popular characters from previous games. It is the only main installment to not feature franchise mascot Scorpion. Characters omitted from this game were included in two titles produced to update it: Ultimate Mortal Kombat 3 (1995) and Mortal Kombat Trilogy (1996).

== Gameplay ==
A fight between Sheeva and Kabal

Mortal Kombat 3 builds further on the gameplay of the previous game. A "Run" button, accompanied by a corresponding meter, was introduced. This was primarily to address concern from fans who thought that the previous games gave too much of an advantage to the defending player. The Run meter is drained both by running (the character cannot run backward, only forwards) and by performing combos.

"Chain combos", also known as pre-programmed combos (labeled "dial-a-combos") were also introduced. Chain combos are button sequences that cannot be interrupted once one hit connects; some chain combos end with an uppercut or another move that knocks the opponent into the air so that more damage can be dealt via a traditional juggle combo. To please players of various skill levels, a "Choose Your Destiny" screen appears in the single-player mode to allow player-selectable difficulty.

For the first time, certain levels were interactive by allowing characters to uppercut each other through the ceiling where both characters would continue the battle in a different stage. This could alter the game's level cycle. Both normal uppercuts and uppercuts that are part of a ground combo would result in a level change. Kung Lao's "Whirl Wind Spin" move would also have the same effect. However, if the character is defeated by an uppercut, there is no level change.

All of the different styles of finishing moves featured in Mortal Kombat II (Fatalities, including the non-lethal Babality and Friendship moves) return in MK3. Additionally, Animalities, where the character transforms into an animal in order to kill their opponent, are featured for the first time. To perform an Animality, the player must first perform a Mercy, another new feature where the character can restore a tiny amount of their opponent's health bar after winning the third round (the winner of the match should have lost a round prior). If the opponent is defeated again after showing Mercy, an Animality can be performed. Finally, three new Stage Fatalities can be performed in the Subway, the Bell Tower and the Pit 3.

Another concept introduced in this game is the "Kombat Kode", a 6-symbol code entered at the VS screen in a two-player game to modify gameplay, fight hidden characters or display certain messages. Also introduced in this game was the "Ultimate Kombat Kode", a 10-symbol code, that could be entered after the timer runs out on the continue screen in single player mode. It was used to unlock a robotic version of the character Smoke; it can be done by either the player or the arcade operator. The arcade owner could reset this code by accessing the game's diagnostic menu and resetting the game to the factory settings within the MK3 cabinet (except in version 2.1, which can only be done by accessing the EJB menu). The codes were revealed through gaming magazines, promotional material, and other Mortal Kombat media; three pinball machines released around this time by Williams/Bally/Midway, Jack-Bot, No Fear: Dangerous Sports, and Theatre of Magic, also provided codes, and some of the text messages in this game were intended to lead players to the hidden codes in those games.

== Plot ==
Weary of continuous losses in tournament battle, Shao Kahn, who lost to Liu Kang in the Outworld tournament in the previous game, enacts a 10,000-year-old plan. He would have his Shadow Priests, led by Shang Tsung, revive his former Queen Sindel, who unexpectedly died at a young age. However, she would not be revived in the Outworld, but in Earthrealm. This would allow Shao Kahn to cross the boundary lines and reclaim his queen. When Sindel is reincarnated in Earthrealm, Shao Kahn reaches across the dimensions to reclaim her and, as a result, Earthrealm gradually becomes a part of Outworld, stripping billions of their souls. Only a few are spared, protected by Raiden. He tells them that Shao Kahn must be stopped, but he cannot interfere; due to his status, he has no power in Outworld, and Earthrealm is partially merged with Outworld. Shao Kahn has unleashed extermination squads to kill any Earthrealm survivors. Also, Raiden's protection only extends to the soul, not to the body, so his chosen warriors have to fight the extermination squads and repel Shao Kahn. With his final defeat, every human on Earthrealm is restored.

The game also contains several subplots:

- Having defeated Shao Kahn in Outworld, Liu Kang now finds himself as the prime target of Shao Kahn's extermination squads. In response to the upcoming threat, he aligns himself with Kung Lao and leads the rebellion against Shao Kahn and his Outworld minions. However, he also has an ulterior motive: he seeks to free Kitana's home realm of Edenia.
- With the latest advancements in human technologies, the Lin Kuei decide to automate their human assassins into soulless machines. Four ninjas, Cyrax, Sektor, Smoke, and Sub-Zero, are selected to serve as the first automation prototypes, but Sub-Zero and Smoke refuse to participate, forcing them to leave the clan. Unfortunately, Smoke is captured and is automated along with Sektor and Cyrax and all three are programmed to hunt down and kill Sub-Zero. Meanwhile, learning of the looming Outworld threat, Sub-Zero joins the rebellion against Shao Kahn.
- Jax discovers the location of both Sonya and Kano while in Outworld and, in freeing Sonya, he also frees Kano. Knowing that his near future means arrest, Kano uses this opportunity to escape into the depths of Outworld and ultimately joins Shao Kahn's forces. Sonya and Jax return to Earth and try to warn their government about the looming Outworld threat, but when their pleas are ignored, Sonya and Jax instead prepare themselves for the upcoming war by joining the rebellion.
- Despite both serving Shao Kahn, the Centaurians and Shokan have been at war with each other for years. Suspicions arise when Sheeva, who is appointed Sindel's bodyguard, learns that Motaro is appointed as Kahn's general in his armies. With the apparent, yet unconfirmed, "deaths" of both Kintaro and Goro, Sheeva begins to fear for her own race and makes plans to turn against Kahn should her suspicions prove to be true.
- Largely dependent on a respirator and an undying thirst for revenge against the Black Dragon clan (who he believes was responsible for his brutal attack), Kabal joins the rebellion upon learning of Kano's survival.
- Though he realizes that he is the lone survivor of New York City following the Outworld Invasion, Stryker remains ignorant as to why he survived the attack. However, upon receiving a vision from Raiden and being informed of what has transpired, Stryker decides to find and join the other Earthrealm warriors.
- For many years, Nightwolf received visions that foretold and warned him of the upcoming invasion. Largely ignoring them, he feels guilty for not preventing it, and so joins the human offensive against Kahn by casting a magical protection over his ancestors' traditional homeland in North America. This region becomes a threat to Kahn's occupation of Earth.
- Johnny Cage was hunted down by one of Shao Kahn's extermination squads and killed, apparently by Motaro.

== Characters ==
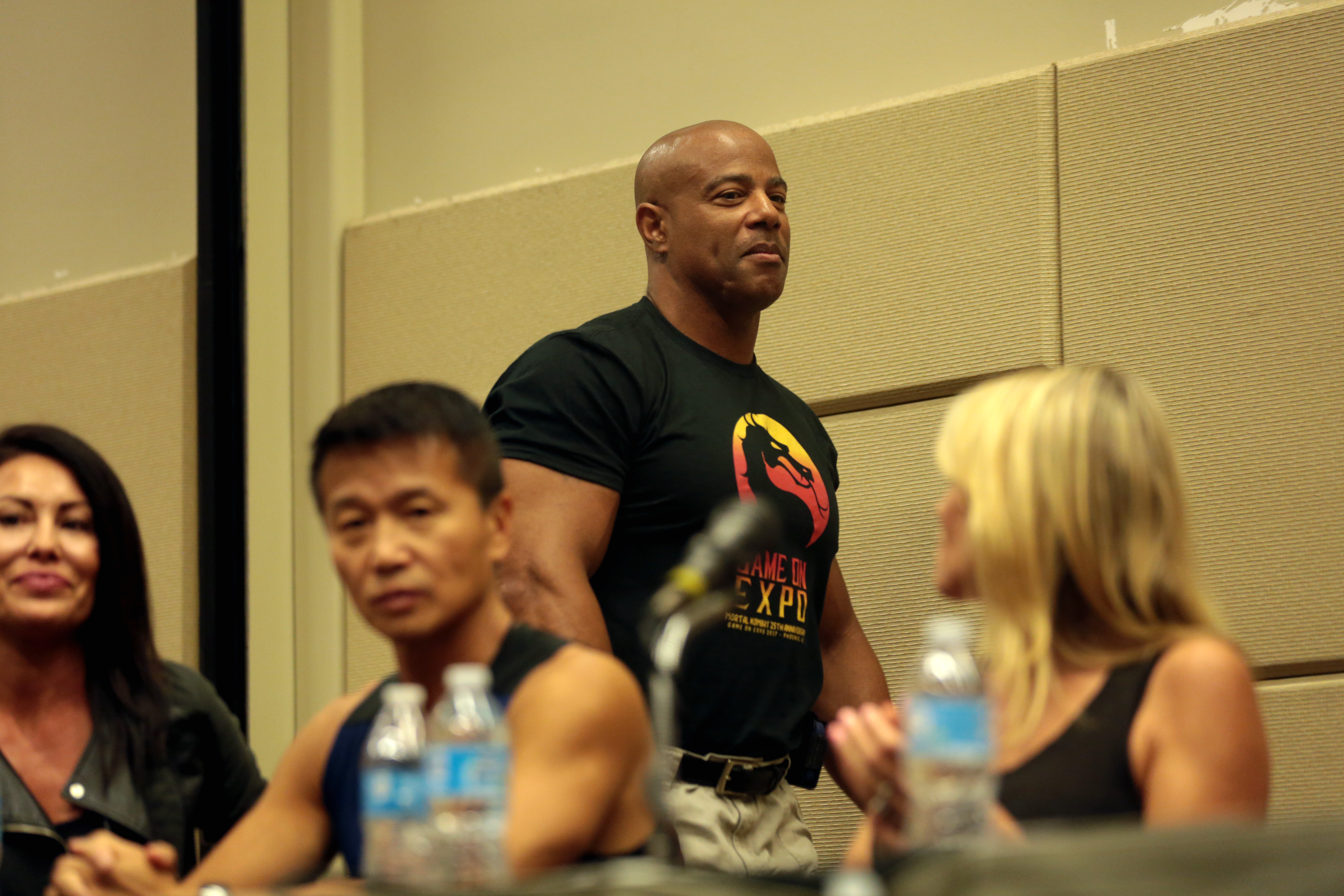
John Parrish (Jax) with Lia Montelongo (Sindel), Kerri Hoskins (Sonya Blade) and Phillip Ahn (Shang Tsung in MKII), reuniting in 2017

The game includes 14 playable characters, with one additional secret character.

New characters:

- Cyrax (Sal Divita) - Yellow-colored Lin Kuei cyber assassin, and first of the three cyber assassins.
- Kabal (Richard Divizio) - Former Black Dragon warrior.
- Nightwolf (Sal Divita) - Native American shaman.
- Sektor (Sal Divita) - Red-colored Lin Kuei cyber assassin and also the second of the three cyborgs.
- Sindel (Lia Montelongo) - Resurrected Queen of Edenia who is being controlled by Shao Kahn. Sindel was originally named Mushasha in the early versions of the game.
- Sheeva (stop motion) - Female Shokan whose loyalty lies in the hands of Shao Kahn, and is also the protector of Sindel.
- Stryker (Michael O'Brien) - Riot control officer.

Returning characters:

- Jax (John Parrish) - Special Forces major who works with Sonya to apprehend Kano.
- Kano (Richard Divizio) - Black Dragon thug who escaped arrest by Sonya and Jax.
- Kung Lao (Tony Marquez) - Shaolin monk who seeks to stop what Kahn is planning.
- Liu Kang (Eddie Wong) - Returning Mortal Kombat champion who defeated Shang Tsung and Shao Kahn in the two previous Mortal Kombat tournaments.
- Sonya Blade (Kerri Hoskins) - Special Forces lieutenant setting out again to capture Kano.
- Sub-Zero (John Turk) - Rogue Lin Kuei ninja who fled the clan after refusing to be converted to a cybernetic unit.
- Shang Tsung (John Turk) - Shao Kahn's devious sorcerer.
- Smoke (Sal Divita) - Indigo-colored cyber assassin from the Lin Kuei and last of the three cyborgs, who was once a close friend of Sub-Zero (unlocked by the Ultimate Kombat Kode).

Boss characters:

- Motaro (stop-motion) - A Centaur and the game's sub-boss.
- Shao Kahn (Brian Glynn, voiced by Steve Ritchie) - Emperor of Outworld and the game's final boss.

Noob Saibot (Richard Divizio) also returns as a hidden opponent.

== Development ==
The development team considered making Mortal Kombat 3 using 3D graphics, but opted to stick with the sprite graphics of the previous games.

The game has a different tone overall than its predecessors and uses a noticeably more muted color palette. Characters were heavily digitized, as opposed to the hybrid digitized/hand-drawn style of MKII. Many of the game's backgrounds were created using pre-rendered 3D graphics for the first time. Its overall style was also differentiated from the previous Mortal Kombat games; instead of the heavy ancient East Asian influences the first two games had, the imagery of MK3 is more Western and contemporary: the game's stages are set in modern locations such as urban highways, bank buildings, and rooftops; three of the characters are cyborgs; and traditional martial art clothing designs, such as Sub-Zero's garb, have been replaced by modern clothing. This change is also reflected in the soundtrack, in which all Asian motifs have been dropped in favor of electronic music instrumentation.

Some of the characters from previous Mortal Kombat games who returned in Mortal Kombat 3 were portrayed by new actors since their original portrayers left Midway due to royalty disputes over the use of their likenesses in console versions. Ho Sung Pak (Liu Kang in the first two games, as well as Shang Tsung in the first Mortal Kombat), Phillip Ahn (Shang Tsung in Mortal Kombat II), Elizabeth Malecki (Sonya Blade), Katalin Zamiar (Kitana/Mileena/Jade) and Daniel Pesina (Johnny Cage and Scorpion/Sub-Zero/Reptile/Smoke/Noob Saibot) were not involved in the production of MK3. Prior to the release of Mortal Kombat 3, Daniel appeared in an advertisement for another fighting game, BloodStorm, which resulted in a false rumor that it got him fired by Midway. All this led to the use of new actors for Liu Kang (Eddie Wong), Sonya Blade (Kerri Hoskins), and Shang Tsung and Sub-Zero (both played by John Turk) in MK3. Richard Divizio (Kano) also took over the role of Noob Saibot (as the character was a recolored Kano in this version). Carlos Pesina, who played Raiden in the first two games, did not appear in MK3 as a penalty for his involvement in the rival game BloodStorm, but was still employed by Midway and his character would return in Mortal Kombat Trilogy, although through the use of recycled sprites from MKII and new sprites performed by Sal Divita.

== Release ==
Q: The abandonment of icons like Scorpion and Kitana ultimately provoked revisions to the MK3 game. What was the impetus for leaving them out, and did you feel it was the right move to add them back in?
A: Actually, leaving them out had nothing to do with provoking UMK3. UMK3 was done to appease arcade operators and make up for the sooner than usual release of MK3's home version by keeping the arcade version fresh.

— John Tobias for Mortal Kombat Online

Accompanied by a massive promotional campaign, Mortal Kombat 3 was originally released for North American arcades on April 15, 1995. The game was soon ported to three home consoles, namely the Sega Genesis, Super NES, and PlayStation. The PlayStation version was described as identical to the arcade original by Ed Boon. As part of a deal with Midway, Sony Computer Entertainment gained exclusive worldwide rights for the 32-bit version of the game up through the end of the first quarter of 1996 (hence why the Sega Saturn, 3DO, and Atari Jaguar versions were all slated for release in the second quarter of 1996). According to a Sega spokesperson, Sony paid Midway $12 million for these timed exclusive rights. Continuing a tradition of simultaneous home version releases from the first two games in the series, it was announced that the Genesis, Super NES, Game Boy, and Game Gear versions would all be released on "Mortal Friday", October 13, 1995; however, the Game Gear version was never released in North America at all. The publishing for the 16-bit console ports and portable versions in North America was handled by Williams Entertainment, rather than Acclaim Entertainment (who handled the console ports of the previous titles), although Acclaim still handled the publishing for Mortal Kombat 3 in Europe. Sculptured Software did the 16-bit and PC MS-DOS versions, while the PlayStation and PC Windows versions were developed by its San Diego development division Leland Interactive Media, which Midway's owner WMS Industries had bought the previous year.

On the Game Boy, only nine of the original 15 fighters (Kano, Sonya, Sub-Zero, Cyrax, Sektor, Sheeva, Sindel, Kabal, and Smoke) are available, only five stages exist, there are no button-link combos, and no finishers outside of Fatalities and Babalities. Shao Kahn uses his moves from Mortal Kombat II, and Motaro is not included. The sole Game Boy game to be rated M by the ESRB, this version does not include much of the overt gore and violence seen in its parent systems but kept some of the "burning" Fatalities (immolating a defeated opponent down to a burnt skeleton).

A scaled-down Game Gear version of Mortal Kombat 3 was released only in Europe. It is very similar to the Game Boy version, although it is in color and features Noob Saibot as a hidden character. It is the only Game Gear Mortal Kombat game to not have blood and gore. There is also a port for the Master System, which is nearly identical to the Game Gear version with the addition of blood and a wider view of the stage and fighters, although it was only released in Brazil by Tec Toy, distributor of Sega's products in that country.

There are two different versions of Mortal Kombat 3 for IBM PC compatibles. The first is an MS-DOS version, which does not closely resemble any of the other ports. This version supports up to 12 players on IPX LAN, and contains a hidden redbook audio track (Track 47) with a narration of a story in reverse. The second is a port of the PlayStation version to Microsoft Windows.

Mortal Kombat 3 was originally slated to be released for the Atari Jaguar in the second quarter of 1996, according to a joint press release issued by Atari and Williams Entertainment on March 13, 1995, but was never released. A port for the 3DO Interactive Multiplayer was also announced for an early 1996 release, touted on magazine covers, and reportedly complete, but was also never released. A port for the Sega Saturn was also announced for early 1996, but was canceled in favor of a port of Ultimate Mortal Kombat 3.

Mortal Kombat 3 is also included in Midway Arcade Treasures 2 for the GameCube, PlayStation 2, and Xbox; Midway Arcade Treasures Deluxe Edition for Windows (this title includes a 'making of' documentary about the game); and Midway Arcade Treasures: Extended Play for the PlayStation Portable.

In 2021, Mortal Kombat 3 was re-released by Arcade1Up along with Mortal Kombat, Mortal Kombat II, and Ultimate Mortal Kombat 3 on one of their Countercades.

To celebrate the 30th anniversary of the first Mortal Kombat game, Arcade1Up released in 2022 an arcade machine with Mortal Kombat 3 along with Mortal Kombat, Mortal Kombat II, Ultimate Mortal Kombat 3, Toobin', Rampage, Joust, Tapper, Wizard of Wor, Gauntlet, Defender, Bubbles, Paperboy, and Klax.

== Reception ==
=== Commercial ===
In the United States, RePlay reported Mortal Kombat 3 to be the most popular arcade game of May 1995. Mortal Kombat 3 was one of three 1995 recipients of the American Amusement Machine Association's Diamond Awards (which are based strictly on sales achievements), along with Sega's Daytona USA and SNK's Neo Geo MVS. It was the highest-grossing arcade conversion kit of 1995 in the United States.

Williams Entertainment, which published the Super NES and Genesis versions, reported combined sales of 250,000 copies in the first weekend they were available, placing them among the best-selling games of 1995. The Super NES version had sold more than one million copies by November 23, 1995. It went on to be the best-selling home video game of 1995 in the United States. The Mega Drive version became the best-selling Mega Drive game in Brazil. Mortal Kombat 3 was nominated for the Video Software Dealers Association's "Video Game of the Year" for 1995, losing to Donkey Kong Country 2.

=== Critical ===
Reception

Review scores
Publication	Score
AllGame	3/5 (GEN); 2/5 (ARC); 2.5/5 (GB)
Computer and Video Games	92% (Mega Drive, SNES, PC); 91% (PS)
Electronic Gaming Monthly	8.675/10 (PS); 8.375/10 (SNES)
IGN	5/10 (PS)
Next Generation	4/5 (PC, GEN); 3/5 (arcade, PS)
PCMag	3/4
Maximum	3/5 (PS)

Although Mortal Kombat 3 was commercially successful, many disliked the inclusion of arguably less appealing new characters (especially Stryker) in place of established stalwarts such as Scorpion and Kitana. The new combo system was also often criticized, as were, to a lesser degree, the run mechanics and some finishing moves. According to PC Gamer in 1998, "While Mortal Kombat 2 managed to improve upon the fast-paced, gore-galore formula of the original, the third incarnation didn't fare nearly as well. MK3 suffered from monkeywrenched gameplay, needlessly stupid finishing moves like 'Animalities,' and unbearably campy character designs." Next Generation reviewed the arcade version of the game, and stated that "in an industry which depends on innovation to keep it fresh and interesting, MK III just doesn't deliver." A Retro Gamer article on the history of the series stated in 2007: "Although many hardcore fans will decree Midway's third Mortal Kombat game to be the best in the series, just as many felt it was beginning of the end for the still massively popular franchise ... While Midway had been constantly adding subtle gameplay tweaks to its franchise since the release of Mortal Kombat, its once exciting series was suddenly looking rather tired."

Nevertheless, the game received largely positive reviews at the time. Electronic Gaming Monthly (EGM) gave the PlayStation version their "Game of the Month" award. EGM and IGN both criticized the heavy lag during Shang Tsung's morphing while assessing the conversion overall as a near-perfect replication of the graphics, content, and controls of the arcade original. However, IGN gave it a negative assessment based on the shortcomings of Mortal Kombat 3 itself, recommending Street Fighter 2D fighting games over it unless one is a "die-hard MK fan". According to a later IGN retrospective, "Despite the evolutions in gameplay, Mortal Kombat 3 was simply not met with same kind of enthusiasm as its predecessor. While the new 'cyber-ninja' characters were popular, the loss of so many favorites from the roster left many players feeling left out. A new Mortal Kombat was impossible to ignore, but the response wasn't quite what Midway had hoped for."

Reviewing the Genesis version, a Next Generation critic remarked that the game actually looks better on a last-generation console, where it finds company with other 2D games and is better-looking than most of them, than it did in the arcade, where it seemed outdated against the increasingly prevalent polygon-based games. He complimented the game for delivering on the elements most important to the Mortal Kombat fanbase, but added as a final note that "as a whole, the MK series is getting stale and in dire need of some major reworking." In their review, GamePro similarly said that Mortal Kombat 3 is "just not original enough (like Tekken) or deep enough (like SF [Street Fighter]) to warrant space on the casual Genesis gamer's shelf." They also criticized the Genesis version as being a weak approximation of the arcade version, particularly the character sprites and sound effects. They assessed the PlayStation version as a much more accurate conversion aside from the lag during Shang Tsung's morphing, but concluded it to be "An awesome home version of a game that wasn't so great to begin with." Next Generation similarly felt the arcade-perfect quality of the PlayStation version was overshadowed by the game's lack of innovation: "There is little, outside of a few new, conspicuously uninspired characters, a run feature, and a new combo system, which simply mirrors its competition, to differentiate MK3 from its predecessors." Maximum praised the PlayStation version's wealth of customization options and "eerie combat music tracks", but remarked that the game was outdated with Ultimate Mortal Kombat 3 already out in arcades and slated for release on the Saturn. They also took strong issue with the lack of PAL optimization, saying that as a result "The characters move very slowly as if wading through treacle, and this detracts from the overall feel of the game as well as changing the timing for the special moves and combos."

Reviewing the SNES version, the four reviewers of Electronic Gaming Monthly concurred it to be by far the best "16-bit version" of the game. They especially praised the challenging enemy AI, accurate graphics, and high number of special options. While they listed some problems with the AI and sound, GamePro had a similar reaction, concluding that "Converting a mammoth arcade game like MK 3 to the 16-bit Super NES is no easy task, and Williams has done a respectable job of keeping all the key elements intact." PC Gamer itself, despite the later negative opinion, gave the PC version of MK3 a review score of 89% upon the release, calling it "yet another excellent arcade experience from the king of fighting games." Next Generation at the time called it "one of the best fighting games ever released for the PC" and "a title you must own" for the fans of the genre, awarding it four out of five stars. Rating the game three out of four stars, PC Magazine said "Mortal Kombat 3 is a startlingly accurate" DOS port. While the "very good" graphics were not as good as on PlayStation, the magazine noted the PC version's network play for up to 12 people. PC concluded that "for flat-out arcade action on the PC, you'll have a hard time finding a better game". GamePro panned the Game Boy version in a brief review, venturing that "even portable power players will find the soft controls and eye-straining graphics unbearable." In 1996, GamesMaster ranked the Mega Drive version as the best game for the system. In the same issue, GamesMaster rated the SNES version 5th in its "The GamesMaster SNES Top 10."

== Legacy ==
Ultimate Mortal Kombat 3 was released to arcades in 1995. It is an update of Mortal Kombat 3, featuring altered gameplay, additional characters, and new arenas. Various home versions of the game were released soon afterward, although none of these were completely identical to the arcade version. Several more home versions followed between 2002 and 2010, including Mortal Kombat Advance for the Game Boy Advance and Ultimate Mortal Kombat for the Nintendo DS. The DS version features the "Puzzle Kombat" minigame originally from Mortal Kombat: Deception.

Ultimate Mortal Kombat 3 itself was updated to include content from previous games in the series and serve as the basis for the console-exclusive title Mortal Kombat Trilogy in 1996. It was also remastered to be released as part of the Mortal Kombat Arcade Kollection in 2011.

Plot elements from the game were used in the 1997 film Mortal Kombat Annihilation, the sequel to the first Mortal Kombat film adaptation.
