= APB (1987 video game) =

1987 video game

- Arcade flyer
- Developer: Atari Games (Note: Ports developed by Tengen.)
- Publisher: Atari Games: Home computers Domark Lynx Atari Corporation
- Designer: Mike Hally
- Programmers: David Theurer; Alan Murphy; Russell Dawe
- Artist: Mike West
- Composers: Brad Fuller; Hal Canon; Earl Vickers; Amiga; David Whittaker
- Platforms: Arcade, Amiga, Atari ST, Commodore 64, ZX Spectrum, Amstrad CPC, Atari Lynx
- Release: Arcade: NA: July 1987; Home computers: UK: 1989; Lynx: NA: August 1991; EU: 1991
- Genre: Vehicular combat
- Mode: Single-player
- Arcade system: Atari System 2

APB (short for "All Points Bulletin") is a 1987 vehicular combat video game developed and published by Atari Games for arcades. The player assumes the role of Bob, a rookie police officer, who drives around the city ticketing motorists for minor infractions and pulling over more serious offenders. Eventually, Bob must apprehend criminals for which an all-points bulletin has been called.

The arcade cabinet resembles a police car, with a gas pedal, steering wheel and a siren button, complete with flashing lights atop the unit. The game's cartoonish visuals and sense of humor gained it positive reviews. The game was slightly criticized for its difficulty; the game's developers later admitted that a long development cycle had resulted in the gameplay growing more complicated than originally planned.

Ports of APB were released for the Amiga, Atari ST, Commodore 64, Amstrad CPC and ZX Spectrum in 1989. The home versions were mostly developed by Tengen and published by Domark. A version for the Atari Lynx handheld was published later in 1991.

== Gameplay ==
Players must pull over various offenders on each day, such as litterbugs.

The object of the game is to meet (or exceed) the daily quota of citing or arresting various types of law-breakers within a time limit for the day. The player is given an overhead view of Officer Bob's patrol car, number 54. The player controls the car with a gas pedal and a steering wheel. Bonuses are awarded for a "perfect day" and each arrest over the quota. Picking up donuts extends the day's time limit. Driving through filling stations refuels the patrol car. Driving through the "Speed Shop" garage daily upgrades the patrol car with brakes, guns, armor, radar, etc.

The first day of the game is where the player must drive on a closed course and use his siren on marked traffic cones. From the second day onwards, the player will ticket common misdemeanor infractions (such as littering) by pulling up behind them, pushing the siren button and having them pull over. Certain offenders require more siren taps to be pulled over. Specific offenses are tied directly to distinctive vehicles (e.g., only the pink convertibles toss litter, and that is the only offense they will commit.) The exception to this is speeding, eventually introduced into the game, which can be perpetrated by any vehicle. Soon new petty lawbreakers are introduced, to include road rage, drunk driving, dopers, et cetera.

The game also gives the player the task of arresting fugitive felons. Every other day, starting on the third day, the player can go after an A.P.B. ("All Points Bulletin"). The stage will start with a scene of multiple officers seen in silhouette where the Chief is showing a mugshot of a suspect wanted for a major crime, the vehicle to be on the lookout for, along with the words "Get this crook today". Examples of major crimes can be expected such as selling narcotics, prostitution, terrorism, or arson, or less commonplace, such as one day where a truck full of nuclear fuel was stolen, and Officer Bob is ordered to recover it.

When a fugitive is caught and returned to the station, the player must violently shake the suspect to get a confession before the Chief enters the room. This is done by filling the "Confess-O-Meter" by tapping alternatively on the "fire" and "siren" buttons. The A.P.B. suspects are named, often in a manner according to their offense: "Bernie Gasman" (wanted for arson), "Cool Hand Duke" (wanted for pimping), "Buzz Geiger" (wanted for nuclear fuel theft). Should Officer Bob get an APB suspect to the station and force him or her to confess, a screen of "Bob's Top 10" will be shown where the convict is then put behind bars and a brief musical tone akin to "Dragnet" is played. In the event the Chief enters the room and sees Bob shaking the suspect, the suspect is let go due to police brutality, and the player is penalized with a demerit, plus one additional demerit for each item on the quota that was not accumulated.

After Day 16, no other petty violators are introduced. The daily quota will be a combination of those above. Other petty violators seen in the game but not formally introduced are hitchhikers and distressed motorists, seen by a man working on a car at a road shoulder and his wife saying "Help!" in which Officer Bob will give them a $75 ticket for his time and aid.

The game's life gauge of sorts is a demerit meter. The game ends when this meter is maxed out. When the demerit limit is reached, the message "TOO MANY DEMERITS. YOU ARE FIRED." is displayed, along with Officer Bob being dragged from the car, handcuffed, and thrown either into the back of a paddy wagon or into a garbage can. Demerits are accumulated for colliding with cones and other vehicles with the siren off, shooting non-offender vehicles, running into doughnut huts and pedestrians, running out of gas (if the quota is met), and failing to get a confession from an A.P.B. Also, demerits come from the player's car exploding through getting hit with dynamite, high-speed collisions with trains and other obstacles, and attempting to jump construction pits at too low a speed. Attaining a certain score, having a demerit-free day, or on rare occasions, finding a money bag with a prize inside, reading "DEMERIT ERASED", will forgive one demerit.

Failure to meet the quota when time expired will have one of four comical scenes, where Officer Bob is dressed down by the Chief for substandard performance, either getting scorched by "dragon breath", strangled by the Chief tugging on Bob's collar, having his nose honked, or having his patrolman's hat draped over his eyes. In addition, the player will be also be given one demerit multiplied by every unticketed infraction. Should this happen on an A.P.B. day but the player successfully apprehended the most wanted suspect, Officer Bob is excused from the quota. Should the player meet the quota, he will then get a radio message "Car 54, return to station", and the player must drive back to the starting point or another police station which has parked squad cars and a space marked "Reserved for Officer Bob". In this case, it will show a pleasant Chief remarking "Nice work" to Officer Bob.

The game cabinet is generally a standard upright. The main controls consist of a steering wheel, a siren button, a "fire" button for the gun and an accelerator pedal. The cabinet has two lights on top, red and blue, which flash when the player presses the siren button. Units feature a detachable seat which can be used to convert the cabinet into a sit-down game.

== Development ==
According to members of the team that worked on the game, APB had an extended development process. Throughout the lengthy development, new gameplay ideas such as the in-game shops were continually added. The developers admitted that as a result, the final game may have been overly complex.

== Reception ==
Reception

Review scores
Publication	Score
Computer and Video Games	88% (Lynx)
IGN	8.5/10 (Lynx)
Raze	83% (Lynx)

Award
Publication	Award
Crash	Crash Smash

The game enjoyed moderate success in the marketplace. Its high-resolution graphics and novel cabinet design, with the flashing lights atop, added to its initial appeal. The game was noted for its increasing difficulty, with The Games Machine calling it at times "utterly frustrating." However, the game's cartoonish graphics and sound along with its humor were well-received, with Your Sinclair calling it "one of the funniest games of the year" and Computer and Video Games calling it "hilarious." The unique gameplay was also lauded; The Games Machine called it "like a breath of fresh air." and Crash said the game was "refreshingly different from the usual mass of bash-or-blast'em ups"

In a retrospective review for Allgame, Paul Biondich wrote that the gameplay "stood the test of time" and that the arcade cabinet's unique design set the game apart in arcades. He also wrote that ten years after its release, the game was still graphically impressive. In addition, he complimented the game's depth, difficulty curve and replay value.

=== Atari Lynx ===
The Atari Lynx version was reviewed by CVG in their August 1991 issue, giving the game a score of 88 out of 100. Robert A. Jung also reviewed the game on the Lynx, calling it "decent adaptation of the original game" and that "The gameplay is fair, and is enhanced by some very appropriate and entertaining sound and graphics." Giving a rating of 8.5 out of 10. Raze Magazine also reviewed the game in their September 1991 issue. Julian Boardman liked the colorful, cartoony graphics and sounds and found the game funny, but after a while irritating. He also found the game quite tricky to master and gave a score of 83%. Electronic Gaming Monthly was less approving of the title. The four reviewers gave it scores of 6, 6, 5, and 6 for an average of 5.75 out of 10. Repetitive gameplay, failing to fully utilize the capabilities of the Lynx, and scaling down the features of the arcade game where complaints leveled against it.

== Legacy ==
The game came to the GameCube, PlayStation 2 and Xbox as part of Midway Arcade Treasures 2 and to Microsoft Windows as part of Midway Arcade Treasures Deluxe Edition. It was released again as part of the compilation Midway Arcade Origins in 2012.
