= Midway Arcade Treasures 3 =

2005 video game compilation

- North American PlayStation 2 box art
- Developers: Digital Eclipse; Gamestar; Midway Studios San Diego
- Publisher: Midway
- Series: Midway Arcade Treasures
- Platforms: GameCube, PlayStation 2, Xbox
- Release: PlayStation 2, Xbox: NA: September 26, 2005; PAL: October 14, 2005; GameCube: NA: October 24, 2005
- Genre: Racing
- Modes: Single-player, multiplayer

Midway Arcade Treasures 3 is the third and final compilation of classic arcade games published by Midway for the GameCube, PlayStation 2, and Xbox. This compilation includes eight racing games that were not in the 2003 and 2004 releases Midway Arcade Treasures and Midway Arcade Treasures 2. Like the first and second installments, however, the Xbox version is not backwards compatible on the Xbox 360. Unlike the other installments in the Midway Arcade Treasures series, it is rated E for Everyone by the ESRB. It also differs from the other installments by focusing on one specific genre (3D racing games), while the first two featured games from a wide variety of genres. The Xbox version has the exclusive ability to upload scores to an online scoreboard to Xbox Live. In line with other online-enabled games on the Xbox, online support was available to players until April 15, 2010. Midway Arcade Treasures 3 is now supported online again on the replacement Xbox Live servers called Insignia.

== Games ==
The games included in Midway Arcade Treasures 3 are:

- Badlands (1989)
- Offroad Thunder (2000)
- Race Drivin' (1990)
- San Francisco Rush the Rock: Alcatraz Edition (1997)
- S.T.U.N. Runner (1989)
- Super Off Road (including its upgrade/add-on pack, Super Off Road Track Pack) [1989]
- Hydro Thunder (1999)
- San Francisco Rush 2049 (1999)

While most of the games in this collection are emulations or recreations of the arcade versions, Hydro Thunder and Rush 2049 are based on the console versions, specifically ports of the Dreamcast releases. Additionally, San Francisco Rush: The Rock was re-programmed from the ground up; while the tracks and vehicles are the same as the arcade version, the physics engine is slightly different, and the audio has been replaced, save for the "What's Your Name?" high score music, but this version runs at 60 frames per second, which is faster than the arcade.

Super Off Road and its Track Pack is the only game on this collection, and in the entire trilogy, that was not developed by Midway, Williams Electronics, or Atari Games. It was developed and published by the Leland Corporation, the predecessor of Midway Studios San Diego, which was acquired as part of the purchase of Tradewest in 1994. For legal reasons, the image of "Ironman" Ivan Stewart has been altered in the two Super Off Road games; he now has sunglasses and a mustache and both games are now known as simply Super Off Road (the original arcade versions were known fully as Ironman Ivan Stewart's Super Off Road). "Ironman's" Speed Shop was renamed Off-Road Speed Shop, and Ivan himself (the gray, AI-controlled racer) was renamed "Lightning" Kevin Lydy. Ivan's name does, however, remain intact on the high score list ("IVN") and game credits.

== Reception ==
Reception

Aggregate score
Aggregator	Score		
Aggregator	GameCube	PS2	Xbox
GameRankings	65%	66%	67%

Review scores
Publication	Score		
Publication	GameCube	PS2	Xbox
Eurogamer	N/A	5/10	N/A
IGN	65%	N/A	N/A

Midway Arcade Treasures 3 received mixed reviews with 66.05% for the PlayStation 2 version, 67.29% for the Xbox version, and 65.61% for the GameCube version from video game aggregator GameRankings.
