= Midway Arcade Treasures: Extended Play =

2005 video game compilation

- European box art
- Developer: Backbone Entertainment
- Publisher: Midway
- Series: Midway Arcade Treasures
- Platform: PlayStation Portable
- Release: NA: December 12, 2005; EU: February 24, 2006
- Genre: Various
- Modes: Single-player, multiplayer

Midway Arcade Treasures: Extended Play is a video game compilation of Midway, Atari and Williams arcade games, released in 2005 for the PlayStation Portable. It was re-released for the PlayStation Store on June 28, 2010 by Warner Bros. Interactive Entertainment, after it acquired most of Midway's assets and arcade library the previous year.

The list contains a total of 21 games, including Defender, Joust, Marble Madness, Paperboy, Sinistar, Spy Hunter and Wizard of Wor.

== Games included ==
- 720° (1986)
- Arch Rivals (1989)
- Championship Sprint (1986)
- Cyberball 2072 (1988)
- Defender (1981)
- Gauntlet (1985)
- Joust (1982)
- Klax (1990)
- Marble Madness (1984)
- Mortal Kombat (1992)
- Mortal Kombat II (1993)
- Mortal Kombat 3 (1995)
- Paperboy (1985)
- Rampage (1986)
- Rampart (1990)
- Sinistar (1983)
- Spy Hunter (1984)
- Toobin' (1988)
- Wizard of Wor (1981)
- Xenophobe (1987)
- Xybots (1987)

== Reception ==
Reception

Aggregate scores
Aggregator	Score
GameRankings	62%
Metacritic	63%

Review scores
Publication	Score
Computer and Video Games	7/10
GameSpot	5.2/10
GameZone	6.9/10
IGN	6/10

Midway Arcade Treasures: Extended Play received mixed reviews from critics. On the review aggregator GameRankings, the game has an average score of 62%, based on 35 reviews. On Metacritic, it has an average score of 63 out of 100, based on 24 reviews. The collection has been criticized for lacking bonus content, the absence of Ultimate Mortal Kombat 3, as well as for its "bare-bones" presentation, lengthy load times, and for making some games look "stretched", (like Paperboy), or "shrunk", (like Sinistar), although one can press the L trigger and hit the Square button when a game is paused to display the games in their original aspect ratio.
