= Xenophobe (video game) =

1987 video game

- Arcade flyer
- Developer: Bally Midway (Note: NES version developed by Sunsoft; Atari 7800 version developed by Blue Sky Software; Commodore 64 version developed by Microplay; Lynx version developed by Epyx.)
- Publisher: Bally Midway: NES Sunsoft 7800, 2600 Atari Corporation Home computers MicroStyle
- Designers: Brian Colin; Howard Shere
- Composers: Michael Bartlow; NES; Naohisa Morota
- Platform: Arcade: NES, Atari 7800, ZX Spectrum, Amiga, Amstrad CPC, Atari ST, Commodore 64, Lynx, Atari 2600
- Release: September 1987: Arcade; NA: September 1987 NES; NA: December 1988 7800; September 1989 ZX Spectrum; UK: October 1989 Amiga, Atari ST, C64, CPC; UK: 1989 Lynx; JP: November 30, 1990; NA: 1990 2600; 1990
- Genre: Action
- Modes: Single-player, multiplayer

Xenophobe is a 1987 action video game developed and published by Bally Midway for arcades. The game sees up to three players attempting to clear an area of as many aliens as possible under a time limit.

== Gameplay ==
Up to three players can simultaneously play across three screens. Each player is recognized by their respective color (visible by the interface at the bottom of their respective screens).

Xenophobe is an action game. The goal of each level is to defeat all the aliens before a countdown timer runs out. Some rooms routinely display the percentage of alien infection and time remaining until self-destruct when the level ends (but a nearby button can temporarily deactivate the count-down). Levels may contain more than one floor, and players use elevators to move between floors. Players can also pick up more powerful weapons to help in their eradication of the aliens.

The hostile Xenos are encounted in a range of forms, beginning with Pods. If Pods hatch, they create a Critter which can attach itself to the player and drain health. If a Critter is not killed, it eventually matures into a Rollerbaby, which roll around to attack the player character. These in turn can grow into the Snotterpillar form, which attacks by leaping or spitting.

In the arcade and Lynx versions, an extra enemy called the Festor can appear in doorways, which can hypnotize and trap players, as well as throw eggs. If the egg lands on a screen with a player, it grows into another Pod.

As players go through the various maps, they encounter various items to be picked up. Some only award bonus points at the end of the level, while others are immediately useful to the players, by restoring health. There are three ways a player can conclude a mission. If the player runs out of time, they are evacuated and the station is overrun. Alternatively, the player can kill a number of Xenos, then self-destruct the space station, gaining bonus points for each enemy defeated. Finally, the player can successfully defeat all the alien invaders, and recover the space station safely, to earn a larger point and health bonus.

In some ports of the game, a player can play as a Snotterpillar and try to stop other players clearing the space station.

== Characters ==
There are nine characters to choose from in Xenophobe, three for each joystick. The leftmost controller (red) features Mr. M.Brace, Dr. Kwack, and Col. Poupon. The middle controller (yellow) features Mr. Fogg, Col F. Truth, and Dr. Udderbay. The right controller (blue) features Mr. Eeez, Dr. Zordirz, and Col. Schickn. Humans and aliens alike make up the playable characters—for instance, Dr. Kwack has a duck's head. Players are also color-coded; for instance, the left player's choices wear red shirts, middle player's yellow, right player's blue.

== Ports ==
Atari Corporation published Xenophobe for the Atari 2600, Atari 7800, Atari ST, and the Lynx. The 7800 port was by BlueSky Software, and the Lynx version by Epyx. A port to Atari 8-bit computers was worked on, but not published.

Sunsoft ported Xenophobe to the NES. The Commodore 64 port was done by Microplay. The game was also released for the Amiga, Amstrad CPC, and ZX Spectrum.

== Reception ==
Lynx Reception

Review scores
Publication	Score
Computer and Video Games	79/100
Electronic Gaming Monthly	5/10, 6/10, 7/10, 6/10
Famitsu	6/10, 7/10, 8/10, 7/10
GamePro	18/25
IGN	8/10
Raze	94%

=== Atari Lynx ===
In a capsule review of the Lynx version for STart, Clayton Walnum commented, "The graphics in some rooms are more detailed than in others, and in general, aren't as impressive as those in ElectroCop, a similar game. Also, the complicated controls take some getting used to." Julian Rignall reviewed the game in the January 1991 issue of CVG Magazine. He went on to say "the graphics and sound are both excellent" with "the gameplay is challenging and addictive". "A fun game which offers plenty of entertainment," giving a final rating of 79 out of 100.

Les Ellis of Raze magazine also reviewed the game for the Atari Lynx calling it an addictive game with excellent graphics, giving a score of 94%. Robert A. Jung review was published to IGN, in it he wrote that Xenophobe was "arguably more fun than its arcade inspiration." Giving a final score of 8 out of 10.

== Legacy ==
In 2004, Xenophobe was included in Midway Arcade Treasures 2 for the PlayStation 2, Xbox, and GameCube. In 2005, it was included in Midway Arcade Treasures: Extended Play for the PlayStation Portable. In 2012, it was included in Midway Arcade Origins for the PlayStation 3 and Xbox 360.
