= Hydro Thunder Hurricane =

2010 video game

- Xbox Live Arcade cover art featuring Tidal Blade, Banshee, and Razorback
- Developer: Vector Unit
- Publisher: Microsoft Game Studios
- Director: Matt Small
- Programmer: Ralf Knoesel
- Engine: Vector Engine
- Platforms: Xbox 360 (XBLA); Windows
- Release: Xbox 360: WW: July 28, 2010; Windows Store: WW: November 5, 2012
- Genre: Racing
- Modes: Single-player, multiplayer

Hydro Thunder Hurricane is a boat racing video game developed by Vector Unit and published by Microsoft Game Studios for the Xbox 360 via Xbox Live Arcade. The game was released on July 28, 2010 as part of Microsoft's Xbox Live Summer of Arcade promotion. It is the sequel to Hydro Thunder, originally an arcade game, and part of the Thunder series, developed by Midway Games and under license of Warner Bros. Games, Midway's license owner. It was also released onto the Windows Store. The game was added to the list of Xbox 360 backward compatible games on Xbox One on December 17, 2015.

Gameplay in Hurricane involves players selecting one of nine boats to race through over-the-top scenarios. Players can collect boost powerups throughout a course which are used to increase the speed of the boat, jump over obstacles, or unlock shortcuts. The game comes with three single player and two multiplayer modes, some of which are new to the series.

Hydro Thunder Hurricane received generally positive reviews. Critics generally praised the varied qualities of the different boats, the diverse arcade-style courses, and the game's overall replay value. The game has sold an estimated 321,000 units as of end-of-year 2012, with the Tempest Pack expansion reaching just over 38,000 units in sales in that same period.

== Gameplay ==
Hydro Thunder Hurricane includes game modes new to the Thunder series, including Ring Master, where the player must navigate through a set of rings on the course as fast as possible.

Hydro Thunder Hurricane is an arcade-style boat racing game, and the sequel to Hydro Thunder. Gameplay involves players selecting one of nine boats to race through one of eight courses. The primary mode of gameplay involves a sixteen competitor race to the finish line. As with Hydro Thunder, players can collect boost powerups throughout a course which physically transform the boat into a more aggressive-looking form. Once transformed, players can use acquired boost to increase the speed of the boat temporarily, or to jump over obstacles. The game's eight tracks are (in order): Lake Powell, Storming Asgard, Monster Island, Tsunami Bowl, Lost Babylon, Paris Sewers, Seoul Stream, and Area 51.

Hurricane continues the Thunder series tradition of hidden shortcuts and alternate routes in courses. Some routes can be found by simply driving towards them or smashing through an obstacle, while others require the player to drive over green powerups which lower gates or raise ramps. Players earn credits by winning races. These credits serve as points which automatically unlock additional gameplay elements, such as boats, skins, new courses and game modes. Players can choose to race a given mode and track additional times to earn more credits.

The game also adds three additional single-player game modes in which to compete. 'Ring Master' removes all AI racing competitors and places a sequence of rings throughout a given course. The objective is to drive through as many rings as possible in the shortest amount of time. 'Gauntlet' also removes AI competitors, but replaces the rings with explosive barrels littered throughout the water. Players must complete the course as quickly as possible while avoiding the barrels. 'Championship' mode is also new to the series, and pits the player in a mixture of tracks and modes.

Hurricane also features a number of multiplayer scenarios. Up to four players can complete via splitscreen against each other and twelve AI competitors. Players can also use any combination of splitscreen and Xbox Live players to play online with up to eight players. Track times are recorded on leaderboards for players to compete against. In addition one multiplayer-exclusive mode was added, 'Rubber Ducky'. In this mode one player on each team pilots a boat in the shape of a rubber duck. The remaining boats on each team try to protect their team's duck while keeping the other team's at bay, with the winning team being first to get their duck across the finish line. Multiplayer races feature a "loser helper" powerup system. Instead of Blue "2X" and Red "4X" boost powerups, multiplayer races features primarily one type of boost powerup, being a yellow one that can give anywhere from 1X to 8X boost. This powerup is dynamic, granting players leading the race with less boost, while those in the rear are awarded more boost. This is to create a more aggressive race, and to allow those with less skill to enjoy racing along with more competitive players. A few 4X powerups are unchanged, however, which can help players keep an edge. Vector Unit explained the decision further on their blog: "If players -- especially new players -- are too easily frustrated, they just say screw this and drop out, which reduces the number of players and the number of available online games".

== Development and marketing ==
Hydro Thunder Hurricane was first unveiled at PAX East on March 26, 2010. It was then used as one of two mystery games for ScrewAttack's Iron Man of Gaming. Hydro Thunder Hurricane was released as part of the third annual Xbox Live Summer of Arcade along with titles such as Monday Night Combat and Limbo. The water was programmed for the game using several different techniques. Fresnel reflections, normal mapping, ray-traced depth fogging and depth-based foam and an adaptive LOD system were built to handle the visuals. The physics system that controls the water allows multiple types of waves such as wakes and whirlpools, and also adapts to handle different boat hulls and other objects in the water. V-hulled boats cut through waves, flat-bottomed boats hydroplane across the water, and multi-hulled boats have greater grip in the water. An external audio contractor, Robb Mills, was called upon to compose the game's music. Developers also provided support for the Xbox 360 Wireless Racing Wheel. A premium theme for the Xbox 360's New Xbox Experience dashboard was also released on July 15 the same year as part of the game's promotion.

The first game demo we made was an original speedboat racing game. The demo showed off the game's controls and our new fluid dynamic system. Microsoft was interested, and through talks with them the idea came up of making this a full-featured sequel to the original Hydro Thunder.

— Game Play Book interview

Hydro Thunder Hurricane did not start life as a Thunder franchise title. Matt Small, creative director for the game explained: "The first game demo we made was an original speedboat racing game. The demo showed off the game's controls and our new fluid dynamic system". Vector Unit co-founders Matt Small and Ralf Knoesel had both previously worked on Blood Wake, a boat combat title for the original Xbox. They took lessons from Blood Wake, altering and updating the physics to be not only realistic, but to "make a game which a Novice player can easily pick up and learn". The team began development on their own I.P. boat racing game, code-named Barracuda. According to Vector Unit: "The basic idea was speedboats meets Supercross in a futuristic post-global-warming flooded Earth".

After six months a working prototype was pitched to several publishers. Microsoft Studios was one of three publishers interested in Barracuda, and talks began for publishing the game: "There was this one producer at Microsoft Game Studios who kept talking about how with a few tweaks Barracuda would make an awesome Hydro Thunder sequel. At first we were like, yeah right, that'll happen. But the more we all talked about it, the more it started to make sense". The decision was made to turn the game into a Hydro Thunder sequel and Microsoft Studios acquired the rights to the Hydro Thunder name shortly before publisher Midway Games went bankrupt and was bought by Warner Bros. Interactive Entertainment.

Hydro Thunder Hurricane was developed using a combination of proprietary and third-party tools. 3D models were created in Maya. Co-founder and Lead Programmer Ralf Knoesel created a plugin which integrated with Maya that allowed artists to see what the boat would look like in-game. The engine was built from the ground up, and unitizes FMOD for sound and Bullet Physics Library as part of the game's physics system. Level construction and placement of props was done in BarracudaEditor, the team's level design tool. During the development process Vector Unit maintained a PC build of the game which allowed artists and other team members to test their assets in-game without moving to an Xbox 360 Debug Kit. A team of seven people worked to create the game; two programmers, four artists, and one sound designer. The game took fourteen months from initial prototype to final build to complete.

Vector Unit had contemplated simply porting the original Hydro Thunder to the Xbox 360, as they had been given the source code to the original game. They felt that given they would have to update all of the assets and that they had already built the water system, the decision was made to continue building the title from the ground up. The original source code was used for reference, and the Vector Unit "played the heck out of the original game to refresh our memories". The boats and environments were redesigned, taking cues from the original, but accommodating the new physics system and updated graphics engine. The developers contemplated things such as boat customization and user-generated tracks, but "ultimately we felt that it was more important to present an accessible, hand-crafted experience that players can just jump into and have fun with". Besides for Xbox 360, Vector also announced the game to be available for Windows 8 via Microsoft's Windows Store when the operating system is released. It joins other ports of popular Xbox 360 Xbox Live Arcade titles such as Ms. Splosion Man, Toy Soldiers and Ilomilo.

=== Updates and downloadable content ===
When asked about the possibility of a PlayStation 3 port of the game, the company stated: "People ask us this all the time, and unfortunately the answer is no. Microsoft Studios licensed the game from Warner, and as you can imagine Microsoft is not generally all that gung-ho about making games for the PlayStation".

The Tempest Pack downloadable content adds three tracks, and two new boats, including the Whiplash (pictured). While the game itself utilized redesigned versions of the original Hydro Thunder boats, the Tempest Pack boats are entirely new to the series.

Vector Unit held a contest from August 14 to 23, 2010 allowing consumers to design a skin for their favorite boat. On August 25, two winners were chosen to have their designs placed into the game. As a consolation prize, everyone who entered a design was notified that they would receive a code to download the content for free once released. Additional boats and tracks were also confirmed on August 9, in an interview with Small.

Vector Unit released DLC pack named Tempest Pack, consisting of three tracks - Atlantis, Castle Von Boom, and Bermuda Triangle, each with Race, Ring Master and Gauntlet game types. Two new boats were included, Whiplash and Psyclone. Vector Unit said that each original boat receives multiple skins, and special Expert versions of the Novice and Pro boats are included, allowing players to be competitive with those boats in multiplayer races. The downloadable content also adds three new achievements to the game.

Players who have not purchased the pack could download a free add-on that would enable them to see the new boats in multiplayer, and view any races on new tracks as a spectator. This was done to keep multiplayer compatibility and to entice more sales of the content. The Tempest Pack was released on October 27, 2010. Vector Unit stated that if sales of Hydro Thunder Hurricane and the Tempest Pack are high enough there may be additional downloadable content: "We'd love to do more; we have all kinds of ideas for new boats, new tracks, the whole shebang. But the first part of your question hits the nail on the head: it's all about the sales".

== Reception ==
Reception

Aggregate score
Aggregator	Score
Metacritic	75/100

Review scores
Publication	Score
Destructoid	8/10
Edge	8/10
Eurogamer	7/10
Game Informer	8/10
GamePro	4/5
GameSpot	8/10
GamesRadar+	4/5
GameTrailers	7.4/10
GameZone	8.5/10
Giant Bomb	4/5
IGN	5.5/10
Joystiq	4/5
Official Xbox Magazine (US)	8/10
VideoGamer.com	8/10
The A.V. Club	B
Metro	6/10

Hydro Thunder Hurricane received "generally favorable reviews" according to the review aggregation website Metacritic.

Reviewers were mostly unified on the overall quality for the price of the game. 1Up.com's Bob Mackey called it "a perfect match for Xbox Live Arcade" and the reviewer from GameTrailers said the game "looks sharp for a $15 release". Ludwig Kietzmann of Joystiq called it a "dynamite download" and Dakota Grabowski of GameZone stated it is "the must-have arcade racer of 2010". GamePro echoed these comments, calling the game "a perfect throwback to the 'high production' arcade games of yesteryear". PALGN also enjoyed the game, saying Hurricane "is an extremely accessible and entertaining arcade racing game". The reviewer from Edge praised the game's small touches, including the fast load times, ability to choose between mph and km/h units, inclusion of a useful instant recovery button, support for online splitscreen and "how your rival's times flash up in-race to add just that extra dash of spice".

The boat selection was lauded by critics, praising their uniqueness and selection of alternate skins. Course design also received acclaim. Mackey called the over-the-top course design "like rides at Disneyland". In its preview of the game at PAX East, the reporter from Critical Gamer called the course design "really smart" and said that there were a "good balance of safe paths, risky shortcuts, and chains of boost power-ups". Official Xbox Magazine UK's reviewer cited that "there's a brilliant playfulness to the level design". They further noted the usefulness of the Ring Master mode in guiding the player to some of the game's shortcuts. Critics enjoyed the longevity of the game, noting that between the courses and game types the replay value is greatly increased. Noble McKinley of GamePro praised the game's graphics, calling the scenery "downright gorgeous" and further went on to call the lighting and water effects "quite impressive". GameSpot's Justin Calvert felt the game's leaderboard system was a great asset to the game.

In the most negative review of Hydro Thunder Hurricane by a major publication, Arthur Gies of IGN cited the vibrant colors of the original Hydro Thunder, then criticized Hurricane's visuals, calling them "muted". He also disliked the sounds of the game calling the music forgettable, the announcer obnoxious, and the sound effects "straight from 1994". Criticizing the game's presentation, Gies claimed that Hurricane is "plagued by convoluted menus and awful load times". Simon Parkin of Eurogamer also stated the game had an "absence of personality and flourish", which "perhaps comes from a general lack of nuance or innovation".

=== The Tempest Pack ===
The Tempest Pack downloadable content received high praise from critics. Jim Cook of Gamers Daily News praised the new course design, stating that it was a major draw for Hurricane players. He also gave high marks to the game's two new boats, as well as the addition of refitted Expert class versions of the game's Novice and Pro boats. Cook was critical of the high unlock points of these boats, stating that "[they] may take a while to unlock unless you've been very active with the game". John Laster of XBLA Fans gave the Tempest Pack a "Buy" rating and called the content a great value for fans of the game. He also felt the courses were exceptional, feeling they were "on par, if not better than the tracks released with the game". He wrote that the two new boats were well matched with the other expert boats, and that the upgraded Expert versions of the Novice and Pro boats were "a necessity and something we wish had been included in the original game".

=== Sales ===
As of November 2010, the game had sold over 130,000 units on the Xbox 360. Total sales on the Xbox 360 for 2010 were in excess of 160,000 units. Sales on the 360 continued to be strong, with over 53,000 units being sold the first week of 2011. As of year-end 2011, Xbox 360 sales increased to 223,000 units for the core game and nearly 25,000 for its expansion pack. As of December 2012 Xbox 360 sales increased by an estimated 45%, with leaderboards registering over 321,000 players. Similarly performed Tempest Pack, with just over 38,000 registered players, which within the first week, sold over 5,300 units.
