= S.T.U.N. Runner =

1989 video game

- Arcade flyer
- Developers: Atari Games (arcade); The Kremlin (ports); Atari Corporation (Lynx)
- Publishers: Arcade: NA: Atari Games; EU: Jaleco; JP: Namco/Sega; Lynx; Atari Corporation
- Designer: Ed Rotberg
- Programmer: Andrew J. Burgess
- Artists: Sam Comstock; Will Noble; Kris Moser
- Composers: Don Diekneite; Brad Fuller
- Platforms: Arcade, Amstrad CPC, Atari ST, Commodore 64, Lynx, MS-DOS, ZX Spectrum
- Release: NA: September 11, 1989; EU: November 1989; JP: December 1989
- Genres: Racing, vehicular combat
- Arcade system: Atari Hard Drivin'

S.T.U.N. Runner (Spread Tunnel Underground Network Runner) is a 3D racing/shooter game released in arcades by Atari Games in 1989. The player pilots a futuristic vehicle which can exceed 900 mph, through various tunnels and courses with changing environments, hazards and enemies. S.T.U.N. Runner uses polygonal graphics for the vehicles and track, and is based on an evolution of Atari's Hard Drivin' hardware. The custom cabinet was designed to resemble the craft that the player pilots in-game.

The arcade game was released in Europe by Jaleco, and in Japan by Namco and Sega. Home ports were released for the Atari ST, Amiga, Commodore 64, Amstrad CPC, and ZX Spectrum. An Atari Lynx version was published by Atari Corporation in 1991.

== Gameplay ==
Emulated arcade screenshot

The final goal is to reach the "Ultimate Challenge", an endless race filled with surprises, where the player must simply get as far as possible in the allotted time. Markers on the Ultimate Challenge course show the names of the five players who have traveled the furthest, and are tracked independently on the game's traditional high score table.

Twin triggers fire laser cannons mounted atop the craft, and the Start buttons double as the triggers for the Shockwave "smart bomb" weapon.

== Development ==
The game initially began as a remake of Atari's Tunnel Hunt.

The Lynx version was programmed by D. Scott Williamson, an employee of Atari who went on to form the development group Solid Software.

== Reception ==
Reception

Review score
Publication	Score
Electronic Gaming Monthly	6/10, 6/10, 8/10, 7/10 (Lynx)

Commodore User reviewed the arcade game, giving it a 90% rating.

Reviews for the port to the Atari Lynx included Electronic Gaming Monthly, with two reviewers complimenting the game, with one summarizing that "if flying down a tube and wasting opponents turns you than look no further." Two of the other reviewers commented that they lost interest fast and that the game lacked any substantial rise in difficulty as the game progressed.

== Legacy ==
S.T.U.N. Runner is included in Midway Arcade Treasures 3 for the PlayStation 2, Xbox, and GameCube. It was also released for Microsoft Windows as part of Midway Arcade Treasures Deluxe Edition in 2006.
