= 4 Wheel Thunder =

2000 video game

- North American Dreamcast cover art
- Developer: Kalisto Entertainment
- Publisher: Midway
- Composer: Frédéric Motte
- Series: Thunder
- Platform: Dreamcast
- Release: NA: May 2, 2000; EU: June 9, 2000
- Genre: Racing
- Modes: Single player, multiplayer

4 Wheel Thunder is a 2000 racing game developed by Kalisto Entertainment and published by Midway for the Dreamcast. While the game had been in development for some time prior as a separate title, it was eventually decided to rebrand the game into Midway's Thunder series. The game received generally favorable reviews.

== Gameplay ==
4 Wheel Thunder consists of races with vehicles like monster trucks, ATV, or buggy, all of which have different racing features. The goal is to defeat the opponents by coming to the finish line as fast as possible. 12 tracks are available across six locations, and there are shortcuts on each track which can be taken to drive faster through certain sections. The starting position is always the last place, which forces the use of blue and red turbo boosts scattered throughout the tracks. Being an arcade styled racing game, triggers are used as the accelerator/brake, and the analog stick to navigate the vehicles. Players can also use a special turbo button for a speed increase.

In the single-player segment, there are three game modes: Championship, Indoor/Outdoor Arcade and Practice. In Championship, the player has to be either first or second to finish in order to unlock more tracks, while Indoor/Outdoor Arcade includes a series of races with specific differences between the tracks (outdoor ones are longer, and indoor ones have more sharper turns). The additional mode section offers play modes for a multi-player game with two people: balloon, bomb, bomb race and tag battle. In the bomb mode, explosives are tied to the vehicle, with an objective to transfer those to the opponents by ramming them. Bomb race is a variation of bomb, except it has to be all done within a time limit. In balloon mode, collecting balloons gives an extra time with a winning condition being either winning the race itself or collecting the most balloons.

== Reception ==
Reception

Aggregate score
Aggregator	Score
GameRankings	76%

Review scores
Publication	Score
AllGame	2.5/5
CNET Gamecenter	8/10
Computer and Video Games	3/5
Electronic Gaming Monthly	6.67/10 (Note: Three critics of Electronic Gaming Monthly gave the game each a score of 6/10, 7.5/10, and 6.5/10.)
EP Daily	8/10
Eurogamer	9/10
Game Informer	7.25/10
GameFan	90% (Note: In GameFan's viewpoint of the game, three critics gave it each a score of 88, 89, and 93.) (F.M.) 78% (J.W.) 70%
GameSpot	7.3/10
GameSpy	8/10
IGN	8.1/10
Next Generation	2/5

The game received "favorable" reviews according to the review aggregation website GameRankings. The game has been praised for its realistic graphics and fun gameplay, but criticized for its high difficulty level. Midway's influence has been met with mixed reactions, with claims that the game suffers from an "identity crisis" due to elements of the Thunder series being implemented toward the end of the development process. Jeff Lundrigan of NextGen said that the game "has far too many flaws for its slim gameplay value." Michael "Major Mike" Weigrand of GamePro said of the game, "In the arena of off-road Dreamcast racing, 4WT is the current champion – but keep in mind that its only competition is Hardcore Heat. Patient and determined gamers looking for a steep challenge will surely find it in 4WT, but casual drivers should stick to a rental." (Note: GamePro gave the game three 4/5 scores for graphics, control, and fun factor, and 3/5 for sound.)
