= Wizard of Wor =

1981 video game

- Arcade flyer
- Developer: Dave Nutting Associates (Note: Atari 2600 version developed by Gabriel Industries.)
- Publisher: Midway Manufacturing: 2600, 5200 CBS Electronics Atari 8-bit Roklan
- Designers: Tom McHugh; Dave Nutting
- Programmers: C64; Jeff Bruette
- Platforms: Arcade, Bally Astrocade, Atari 2600, Atari 5200, Atari 8-bit, Commodore 64, Commodore Max
- Release: June 5, 1981: Arcade; NA: June 5, 1981; Astrocade; August 1982; 2600; December 1982; 5200; October 1983; Atari 8-bit, C64; 1983
- Genre: Maze
- Modes: Single-player, multiplayer

Wizard of Wor is a 1981 maze video game developed by Dave Nutting Associates and published by Midway Manufacturing for arcades. The player controls a Worrior, who must defeat all the monsters inside enclosed mazes while being careful not to be destroyed themselves. The game can be played in multiplayer where two players can either cooperate or compete to destroy the monsters in the mazes.

The game was ported to the Atari 8-bit computers, Commodore 64, Commodore Max, Atari 2600, and Atari 5200 and renamed to The Incredible Wizard for the Bally Astrocade.

== Gameplay ==
A typical multiplayer game in progress. The two Worriors (player characters) are traversing the maze in search of Burwors to destroy. The Worriors on the far left and right sides of the screen represent the players extra lives.

Wizard of Wor is an action maze video game; the player controls a Worrior through an enclosed maze. The objective of the game is to defeat all of the monsters—Burwors (blue), Garwors (yellow), and Thorwors (red)—which are present in the maze, while also avoiding being destroyed by them. When all the monsters are defeated, the player advances to the next maze. If a Worrior is destroyed by a monster, the player loses a life; the game ends when all lives are lost.

Aside from the monsters that must be destroyed, players also encounter two additional enemies that can be found after the first maze is cleared and destroyed for bonus points. A Worluk appears when all monsters are defeated and, when destroyed, doubles the points gained in the next maze. However, Worluks only lingers in the maze for a limited period of time before fleeing. Once the Worluk is destroyed, the eponymous Wizard of Wor has the chance to appear, but unlike a Worluk stays in the maze until they either are killed or destroy a Worrior. Each maze features tunnels, which allow Worriors or monsters to travel to the opposite side of the screen. Once entered, these tunnels become temporarily unusable for a short period of time. A radar display at the bottom of the screen indicates the location of monsters.

The game increases in difficulty as the game progresses; the monsters become harder to avoid and the mazes become more open, making it more difficult to dodge them. The game has functions for multiplayer, allowing a second player to play. In multiplayer, the two Worriors can either cooperate to defeat the monsters or compete to see who can score the most points.

=== Audio ===
The game occasionally makes use of digitized audio during gameplay. Each maze begins with a rendition of the five-note opening of Dragnet, however, if the Warluck isn't killed, the fifth note of the piece doesn't play. The Wizard of Wor also repeatedly mocks the player throughout the game, with the audio itself using speech synthesis.

== Development ==
In the early stages of development, the game was titled Invisible Monsters. A prototype version of Invisible Monsters was created and issued a copyright year of 1980. This version was not known about to the general public until around 2016-2017, when it appeared on Craigslist and was bought by a user who shared pictures of the game cabinet and created a YouTube video explaining the differences of the prototype more in-depth. The prototype plays very similarly to the final game, but there is a distinct lack of speech synthesis present. Aside from the prototype, nothing else is known about the production of the game.

== Reception ==
Wizard of Wor was moderately successful in arcades.

Electronic Games called the Atari 8-bit version "outstanding". It similarly praised the arcade version, stating that while one-person and competitive two-person play was excellent, two people cooperating was "a unique playing experience".

Danny Goodman of Creative Computing Video & Arcade Games called The Incredible Wizard for the Astrocade "an incredibly good replica" of Wizard of Wor. Video magazine's 1982 Guide to Electronic Games agreed, calling it "a near-perfect translation" of the arcade original. It was awarded "Best Multi-Player Video Game" at the 4th annual Arkie Awards where it was described as "the finest cartridge ever produced for [the Astrocade]", and the Atari version would be honored at the 5th Arkies with a Certificate of Merit in the same category. In 1995, Flux magazine ranked the game 84th on their "Top 100 Video Games".

== Legacy ==
Wizard Of Wor appeared in the 1983 film Joysticks. The game is included in the compilations Midway Arcade Treasures 2 (2004) and Midway Arcade Origins (2012). It was also included in the Arcade1Up Mortal Kombat II cabinet under the "Midway Legacy Edition Arcade" released in 2021.
