= Midway Arcade Treasures =

2003 video game compilation

- North American cover art
- Developer: Digital Eclipse
- Publisher: Midway
- Series: Midway Arcade Treasures
- Platforms: PlayStation 2, Xbox, GameCube, Windows
- Release: November 18, 2003: PlayStation 2; NA: November 18, 2003; EU: February 6, 2004 Xbox; NA: November 24, 2003; EU: February 6, 2004 GameCube; NA: December 17, 2003 Windows; NA: August 31, 2004; EU: October 22, 2004
- Genre: Various
- Modes: Single-player, multiplayer

Midway Arcade Treasures is a 2003 video game compilation of 24 arcade games, emulated from the original PCBs. The compilation was developed by Digital Eclipse and issued by Midway for the PlayStation 2, Xbox, GameCube, and Microsoft Windows.

Midway followed up Arcade Treasures with two compilations of additional games: Midway Arcade Treasures 2 in 2004 and Midway Arcade Treasures 3 in 2005. A mixture of titles from these compilations was released for PlayStation Portable in 2005 as Midway Arcade Treasures: Extended Play, and a Windows-exclusive combination of volumes 2 and 3 released in 2006 as Midway Arcade Treasures Deluxe Edition.

The original compilation was later re-released as Midway Arcade Treasures 1, with the title and packaging updated to match the succeeding volumes, but the lineup of games remained the same.

== Features ==
The compilation plays similarly on all three consoles, but the Xbox version has the extra ability to upload scores to an online scoreboard. The special features on each version of the game are the same. These include game histories, developer interviews and other documents. This compilation is a combination of the games included in Williams Arcade's Greatest Hits, Midway's Greatest Arcade Hits, and Arcade Party Pak for the original PlayStation and PC and each contain exactly the same extras from those collections. Additionally, there are eleven more games included that are not found in those collections.

While the PlayStation 2 and GameCube versions can be played on the earliest models of the PlayStation 3 and Wii respectively (due to their backwards compatibility), the Xbox version is not Xbox 360 compatible.

== Games ==
Re-release cover art, designed to match that of the later volumes in the series.

The collection consists of the following 24 arcade games:

- 720° (1986)
- Blaster (1983)
- Bubbles (1983)
- Defender (1981)
- Defender II (a.k.a. StarGate) (1981)
- Gauntlet (1985)
- Joust (1982)
- Joust 2: Survival of the Fittest (1986)
- Klax (1990)
- Marble Madness (1984)
- Paperboy (1985)
- Rampage (1986)
- Rampart (1990)
- RoadBlasters (1987)
- Robotron: 2084 (1982)
- Root Beer Tapper (1983)
- Satan's Hollow (1982)
- Sinistar (1983)
- Smash TV (1990)
- SPLAT! (1982)
- Spy Hunter (1983)
- Super Sprint (1986)
- Toobin' (1988)
- Vindicators (1988)

== Reception ==
Reception

Aggregate scores
Aggregator	Score		
Aggregator	GameCube	PS2	Xbox
GameRankings	75.31%	73.86%	75.02%
Metacritic	72/100	76/100	74/100

Midway Arcade Treasures received mixed to positive reviews from reviewers at GameRankings with a score of 75.31% for the GameCube version, 73.86% for the PlayStation 2 version, and 75.02% for the Xbox version. Criticisms are the poor menu layout, slowdown in Smash TV, for the documentaries and interviews having video quality that is grainy and unrestored, as well as the documentaries and interviews being rehashed from previous Midway collections.

Midway Arcade Treasures also received mixed and positive reviews from review aggregator Metacritic, with a score of 76 for the PlayStation 2 version, a score of 74 for the Xbox version, and the lowest being a score of 72 for the GameCube version. The reviews were mostly the same as GameRankings, stating the game's positive and negative points. Many of the complaints were based on the DVD content having poor, and stuttering quality, the menu being not pleasant to look at, and some of the games being difficult to control (with Vindicators as the main point of focus). Reviewers concluded that the collection was worth getting.

The compilation sold more than a million units by August 2005.

== Similar collections ==
=== Game Center USA: Midway Arcade Treasures ===
A similar collection of Midway arcade games was also released exclusively in Japan by Success under the title Game Center USA: Midway Arcade Treasures, which compiled 32 select games from the original Midway Arcade Treasures and Midway Arcade Treasures 2 and was released for the PlayStation 2 on September 21, 2006.

The included games are 720°, A.P.B., Arch Rivals, Bubbles, Championship Sprint, Cyberball 2072, Gauntlet, Gauntlet II, Hard Drivin', Joust, Joust 2: Survival of the Fittest, Klax, Kozmik Krooz'r, Marble Madness, Paperboy, Pit-Fighter, Rampart, RoadBlasters, Robotron: 2084, Root Beer Tapper, Satan's Hollow, SPLAT!, Spy Hunter, Spy Hunter II, Super Sprint, Timber, Toobin', Total Carnage, Vindicators, Wacko, Xenophobe, and Xybots.

=== Midway Arcade ===
After Midway's bankruptcy, Warner Bros. Interactive Entertainment acquired the rights to Midway's games and released another arcade compilation called Midway Arcade Origins in 2012 for the PlayStation 3 and Xbox 360, which included 29 select games from Midway Arcade Treasures volumes 1 and 2 plus Super Off Road from 3. It also contains Vindicators Part II, which replaced the original Vindicators from Midway Arcade Treasures.

Another collection simply titled Midway Arcade was released for iOS devices in 2012. The compilation included 5 games from the original Midway Arcade Treasures: Defender, Joust, Rampage, Root Beer Tapper, and Spy Hunter, as well as Arch Rivals from Midway Arcade Treasures 2. This compilation also included four non-proprietary arcade games: Air Hockey, Arcade Basketball (themed after Arch Rivals), Pool, and Roll Ball, as well as a redemption center where players would purchase prizes using tickets and a jukebox that allowed players to play music from their iTunes library.

Two packs containing three additional games were also purchasable from the App Store: the Action Game Pack contains A.P.B., NARC, and Total Carnage from Midway Arcade Treasures 2, while the Adventure Game Pack contains Gauntlet from the original Midway Arcade Treasures, as well as Gauntlet II and Wizard of Wor from Midway Arcade Treasures 2.

== See also ==
- Williams Arcade's Greatest Hits
- Midway's Greatest Arcade Hits
- Arcade Party Pak
- Midway Arcade Origins
