= Arcade's Greatest Hits: The Atari Collection 2 =

1998 video game compilation

- European PlayStation box art
- Developer: Digital Eclipse
- Publishers: NA: Midway; EU: GT Interactive
- Series: Arcade's Greatest Hits
- Platforms: PlayStation, Windows
- Release: NA: April 1, 1998; EU: April 17, 1998
- Genre: Various
- Modes: Single-player, multiplayer

Arcade's Greatest Hits: The Atari Collection 2 is a 1998 video game compilation of six arcade games for the PlayStation and Microsoft Windows. Crystal Castles and Millipede were licensed from Atari Corporation while the others were owned by the Midway-owned Atari Games. The compilation contains artwork and info on each game, and all games are presented in their original format.

The PlayStation version is only compatible with the original PlayStation, as it has compatibility issues with all models of the PlayStation 2.

== Games included ==
The collection of games differs slightly between the PlayStation and Windows versions.

- 720° (1986) (Note: Exclusive to Windows version)
- Crystal Castles (1983) (Note: Exclusive to PlayStation version)
- Gauntlet (1985)
- Marble Madness (1984)
- Millipede (1982)
- Paperboy (1985)
- RoadBlasters (1987)
- Vindicators (1988)

== Reception ==
Reception

Review scores
Publication	Score
Electronic Gaming Monthly	6.875/10 (PS1)
GameSpot	4.3/10 (PS1)
PlayStation: The Official Magazine	7/10
Superjuegos	87/100 (PS1)

Four reviewers for Electronic Gaming Monthly praised the collection's choice of games, regarding all of them as recognizable classics, and applauded the developer, Digital Eclipse, for not only perfectly converting the games to the PlayStation, but including support for every PlayStation peripheral that the games could possibly benefit from. They warned that the games had not aged well enough that players who had not played them when they were first released would be likely to enjoy them, additionally criticized that Marble Madness is not as fun without a trackball and Paperboy is not as fun without the handlebars, and were even split on whether the collection was worth picking up. Superjuegos did not agree that the conversions are perfect, remarking that the screen mode used makes Paperboy appear blurry and the frame rate of RoadBlasters is lower than the arcade version. However, they considered these imperfections minor against the hours of fun gameplay offered by the collection, especially Gauntlet. Jeff Gerstmann, writing in GameSpot, echoed the criticisms about the screen blurring and the weakness of Marble Madness and Paperboy without their signature arcade controls, but with greater emphasis, and concluded that the conversions were so lacking that players would be better off searching for the original arcade versions of the games.

== See also ==
- Arcade's Greatest Hits: The Atari Collection 1
