= Arcade Party Pak =

1999 video game compilation

- European box art
- Developer(s): Digital Eclipse
- Publisher(s): Midway Games
- Platform(s): PlayStation
- Release: NA: October 27, 1999; EU: February 23, 2001
- Genre(s): Various
- Mode(s): Single-player, multiplayer

Arcade Party Pak is a PlayStation compilation of six Atari and Midway games: 720°, Klax, Rampage, Smash TV, Super Sprint, and Toobin'. All games are presented in their original arcade formats as individually launchable games from the main menu.

== Gameplay ==
The player is presented with a main menu where they can select from the 6 arcade titles. For each game they can select various settings such as skill level, number of lives and if they want high scores automatically saved to the memory card. In addition to the games themselves, there are also behind the scenes interviews on the making of the games presented as an FMV. The compilation features the following games:

=== 720° (1986) ===
A skateboarding game where the player must complete tricks to increase their score.

=== Klax (1990) ===
A puzzle video game where blocks roll towards the player who can catch them on a panel and drop them into the playing area below to get color matches to score points.

=== Rampage (1986) ===
The player takes control of gigantic creatures with the main goal being to destroy the city and the military forces trying to stop you.

=== Smash TV (1990) ===
The setting is a futuristic ultra violent game show where the player must defeat hordes of oncoming enemies in each room to progress.

=== Super Sprint (1986) ===
A quick paced overhead 3 player car racing game.

=== Toobin' (1988) ===
A river race in an inflatable tube while avoiding obstacles and crashing into competitors.

== Faithfulness to the original games ==
Skill levels and number of lives can be set before starting the game, making it less harsh in terms of difficulty. On the negative side there are frame rate drops in Rampage, and a darker colour palette in 720° and Toobin'.

== Peripherals ==
Most games are either compatible with a certain peripheral or they're not, but due to Arcade Party Pak's multiple game set-up, compatibility is on a game by game basis. Rampage is compatible with the multitap, allowing up to 3 players, 720° can take advantage of the PlayStation Mouse but for player 2 only and Super Sprint is compatible with the mouse for any player. Although not mentioned in the game's manual, Super Sprint can be played with the PlayStation steering wheel. Smash TV benefits from analog stick compatibility, effectively turning it into a true twin-stick shooter.

== Compatibility ==
Whereas most PS1 games are compatible with the PlayStation 2, Arcade Party Pak is a PlayStation game partially incompatible with PlayStation 2.

== Reception ==
Digital Press magazine gave the game a 33/40,PlayStation Official Magazine – UK gave the game a 5/10 and Gamers' Republic gave the game a B rating.
