= Midway Arcade Origins =

2012 video game compilation

- North American cover art
- Developer: Backbone Entertainment
- Publisher: Warner Bros. Interactive Entertainment
- Platforms: PlayStation 3, Xbox 360
- Release: NA/PAL: November 6, 2012
- Genre: Various
- Modes: Single-player, multiplayer

Midway Arcade Origins is a 2012 video game compilation developed by Backbone Entertainment and published by Warner Bros. Interactive Entertainment for the Xbox 360 and PlayStation 3. A successor to the Midway Arcade Treasures series, it compiles several arcade games that were owned or published by Midway Games from 1981 to 1992. The compilation was published after Warner Bros. Interactive Entertainment had acquired the rights to the games following Midway's bankruptcy. The game was made playable on the Xbox One via the backwards compatibility program.

== Games ==
Midway Arcade Origins compiles 31 emulated arcade games owned by the now-defunct Midway Games. A majority of the titles, with the exception of Vindicators Part II, have appeared in the compilation series Midway Arcade Treasures.

Games included in Midway Arcade Origins
Title	Genre	Original release	Developer
Defender	Shoot 'em up	1981	Williams Electronics
Stargate (Note: Titled as Defender II for home console ports of the game.)	Shoot 'em up	1981	Vid Kidz
Wizard of Wor	Action	1981	Dave Nutting Associates
Joust	Action	1982	Williams Electronics
Robotron: 2084	Shoot 'em up	1982	Vid Kidz
Satan's Hollow	Shoot 'em up	1982	Midway Games
Sinistar	Shoot 'em up	1983	Williams Electronics
Bubbles	Action	1983	Williams Electronics
Spy Hunter	Vehicular combat	1983	Midway Games
Marble Madness	Platformer	1984	Atari Games Inc.
Root Beer Tapper	Action	1984	Marvin Glass and Associates
Gauntlet	Dungeon crawler	1985	Atari Games
720°	Sports	1986	Atari Games
Championship Sprint	Racing	1986	Atari Games
Gauntlet II	Dungeon crawler	1986	Atari Games
Joust 2	Action	1986	Williams Electronics
Rampage	Action	1986	Midway Games
Super Sprint	Racing	1986	Atari Games
APB	Action	1987	Atari Games
Spy Hunter II	Vehicular combat	1987	Midway Games
Xenophobe	Action	1987	Midway Games
Xybots	Shooter	1987	Atari Games
Toobin'	Action	1988	Atari Games
Vindicators Part II	Shoot 'em up	1988	Atari Games
Arch Rivals	Sports	1989	Midway Games
Super Off Road	Racing	1989	Leland Corporation
Tournament Cyberball 2072	Sports	1989	Atari Games
Pit-Fighter	Fighting	1990	Atari Games
Rampart	Strategy	1990	Atari Games
Smash TV	Shoot 'em up	1990	Williams Electronics
Total Carnage	Shoot 'em up	1992	Midway Games

== Reception ==
On Metacritic, a review aggregator, the Xbox 360 version has a score of 61/100 from eleven reviews, and the PS3 version has a score of 58/100 from four reviews. In IGN's review, Samuel Claiborn wrote the collection features great games, but technical problems – including poor controls – makes the online leaderboards the only reason to play it.
