= Klax (video game) =

1990 video game

- North American arcade flyer
- Developer: Atari Games (Note: Home computer and initial console versions developed by Tengen; Atari ST and MS-DOS versions developed by Teque Software; Game Gear and Master System versions developed by Tiertex; Game Boy Color version developed by Digital Eclipse; Game Boy Advance version developed by Frame Studios Interactive.)
- Publishers: Atari Games: JP: Namco Home computers Domark NES; NA: Tengen; JP: Hudson Soft Genesis/Mega Drive; NA/EU: Tengen; JP: Namcot 2600, Lynx Atari Corporation Game Boy Mindscape TurboGrafx-16, Master System, Game Gear Tengen Game Boy Color Midway Game Boy Advance; NA: Destination Software; EU: Zoo Digital Publishing
- Designers: Dave Akers; Mark Stephen Pierce
- Programmer: Dave Akers
- Artist: Mark Stephen Pierce
- Composer: Brad Fuller: NES LX Rudis Dave O'Riva Amiga, CPC, ST, C64, Spectrum Matt Furniss
- Platform: Arcade: Amiga, Atari ST, Amstrad CPC, BBC Micro, Commodore 64, Commodore 128, MS-DOS, MSX, SAM Coupé, ZX Spectrum, NES, Atari 2600, TurboGrafx-16, Genesis/Mega Drive, Lynx, Game Boy, X68000, PC-88, PC-98, Master System, Game Gear, Game Boy Color, Game Boy Advance
- Release: February 1990: Arcade; NA: February 1990; JP: March 1990; EU: April 1990 Amiga, Atari ST, BBC Micro, C64, C128, CPC, MS-DOS, MSX, Spectrum; UK: April 1990 NES; NA: July 1990; JP: December 14, 1990 2600; UK: Mid-1990 TurboGrafx-16; JP: August 10, 1990; NA: September 1990 Genesis/Mega Drive; JP: September 7, 1990; NA: September 1990; EU: November 1991 Lynx; JP: September 15, 1990; NA: October 1990 Game Boy; JP: December 14, 1990; NA: August 1991 X68000; JP: December 14, 1990 Master System; EU: November 1991 Game Gear; EU: December 10, 1992; NA: 1992 Game Boy Color; NA: April 1999 Game Boy Advance; NA: August 22, 2005; EU: September 16, 2005
- Genre: Puzzle
- Modes: Single-player, multiplayer

Klax is a 1990 puzzle video game developed and published by Atari Games for arcades; in Japan, it was distributed by Namco. The game was designed and animated by Mark Stephen Pierce, with software engineering by Dave Akers. The object of the game is to catch colored tiles moving down a conveyor belt, and arrange them in matching rows and patterns to make them disappear.

Klax was originally released in February 1990 as an arcade follow-up to Tetris (1989), about which Atari Games had been in a legal dispute. It was later ported to several home and handheld systems, including the Nintendo Entertainment System, Genesis, Master System, TurboGrafx-16, Game Boy, and Lynx. The Atari 2600 version of the game, released in the UK in mid-1990, was one of the final licensed games for the console, which was discontinued in early 1992.

== Gameplay ==
Arcade screenshot

Controls consist of a four-position joystick and a button. The player controls a small paddle at the lower end of a conveyor belt. Using the joystick, the player can move the paddle left or right to catch tiles in various colors as they advance down the conveyor. Below the paddle is a well that can hold up to 25 tiles in five columns of five; pressing the button causes the topmost tile on the paddle to fall directly downward and into the well, as long as that column is not full. The goal is to form "Klaxs", or unbroken horizontal/vertical/diagonal lines containing three tiles of the same color. Doing so awards points and causes those tiles to disappear, allowing any tiles above them to fall toward the bottom of the well. Bonus points are awarded for completing multiple Klaxs with a single tile (including lines of four or five matching tiles) and for Klaxs formed by the falling of already-placed tiles.

The paddle can hold up to five tiles at any given moment. The player is penalized with one "drop" whenever a tile falls off the conveyor without being caught or while the paddle is full. Pushing up on the joystick will flip the topmost tile on the paddle a short distance up the conveyor, while pulling down accelerates the motion of the tiles.

The game consists of 100 waves, presented as 20 groups of five waves each. At the start of the game and after every fifth wave, the drop meter is cleared and the player is presented with three options of which wave to play next; choosing a later wave awards bonus points and allows more drops. Each wave has an objective that must be reached, such as making a set number of Klaxs, scoring a certain number of points, or surviving a set number of tiles. At the end of a wave, bonus points are awarded for each tile still on the conveyor and paddle and for each empty space in the well. The game ends when the player either exhausts the available drops, completely fills the well, or finishes all 100 waves.

== Development ==
Akers programmed Klax in just a few weeks using AmigaBASIC, then ported each line to C. In a 1990 interview, he said he wanted to "produce something playable, compact and relatively quick to develop". His influences were Tetris and tic-tac-toe. He chose the name from the sound that tiles make rolling across the screen.

== Release ==
Atari Games first released Klax for arcades in February 1990, with Namco releasing the game in Japan a few months later, and soon called it a "major arcade hit". It quickly released several home versions under the Tengen brand. Akers created the Nintendo Entertainment System and Genesis editions. Some 16-bit conversions feature improved graphics. Klax received the Parents' Choice Foundation's seal of approval in 1990, and won Best Mind Game at the 1991 European Computer Leisure Awards. Dennis Lynch of the Chicago Tribune named Klax the Best Cartridge of 1990. Klax is the first game with versions for all three of the leading 1990s consoles: the NES, the Genesis, and the TurboGrafx-16. After the arcade version, Klax was converted to most contemporary home computers and video game systems of the 1990s, including the Atari Lynx, Amstrad GX4000, and the Atari 2600 as its final official Atari-licensed release exclusively in Europe. The Atari 7800 version was programmed by David Dentt, who also worked on Ninja Golf for the same console.

Midway Games gained the rights to Klax upon purchasing Atari Games in 1996. A 1999 press release called it Midway's "tic-tac tile puzzle game". Mike Mika, who worked on the Game Boy Color version, placed a hidden wedding proposal inside the game, which took his girlfriend three years to uncover. Mika also inserted a hidden Snake-like game and a mini-adventure game as easter eggs.

Klax has since been re-released in video game compilations for modern consoles. The game was included in Arcade Party Pak for the PlayStation. It was reissued in Midway Arcade Treasures, a 2003 compilation for the GameCube, PlayStation 2, Xbox, and PC. It appears in Lego Dimensions.

== Reception ==
Reception

Review score
Publication	Score
Electronic Gaming Monthly	7/10, 6/10, 7/10, 7/10 (NES); 9/10, 8/10, 8/10, 8/10 (Lynx); 8/10, 8/10, 7/10, 7/10 (GEN)

Award
Publication	Award
Crash	Smash

In Japan, Game Machine listed Klax as the seventh most successful table arcade unit of March 1990.

On release, Famicom Tsūshin awarded the PC Engine version 30 out of 40. Klax was ranked the 26th best game of all time by Amiga Power in 1991. The NES version is ranked 44 in IGN's Top 100 NES Games.

In a capsule review of the Lynx version for STart, Clayton Walnum commended the gameplay, graphics, music, sound effects and speech. Julian Rignall reviewed the Atari Lynx version for CVG Magazine in January 1991, saying "the game is simple, but very, very addictive" and giving a rating of 93 out of 100.
