= Super Sprint =

1986 video game

- North American arcade flyer
- Developer: Atari Games
- Publishers: Atari Games: ZX Spectrum, CPC, Atari ST, C64 Electric Dreams Software NES/Famicom; NA: Tengen; JP: Altron
- Designers: Robert Weatherby; Kelly Turner
- Programmers: Robert Weatherby; Kelly Turner
- Artists: Will Noble; Kris Moser; Sam Comstock
- Composer: Hal Canon: NES/Famicom Brad Fuller
- Series: Sprint
- Platforms: Arcade, ZX Spectrum, Amstrad CPC, Atari ST, Commodore 64, Nintendo Entertainment System
- Release: April 1986: Arcade; NA: April 1986 ZX Spectrum; UK: September 1987 Atari ST, CPC, C64; UK: 1987 2600; March 1989 NES/Famicom; NA: July 1989; JP: August 3, 1991
- Genre: Racing
- Modes: Single-player, multiplayer
- Arcade system: Atari System 2 Hardware

Super Sprint is a 1986 racing video game developed and published by Atari Games for arcades. Up to three players drive Formula One-like cars on a circuit that is viewed from above. The game is a successor to Gran Trak 10 and the Sprint series, which were originally produced by Atari, Inc. during the 1970s. Later in 1986, the game was revised and re-released as Championship Sprint with different tracks; this version was ported to the Amstrad CPC, Atari ST, Commodore 64 and ZX Spectrum in 1987. The 1990 game Badlands adds vehicular combat to Super Sprint-style racing.

== Gameplay ==
Arcade screenshot

Up to three players drive simultaneously on a circuit against opponents controlled by the computer. The circuits are viewed from above and always fit on the screen, so the game never scrolls. After three laps, the winner advances to the next circuit. There are eight circuits in total, but the game only ends if the player can reach race 85, where the bonus Super Speedway circuit is played. As the player advances to higher levels, more and more obstacles appear on the track, like oil puddles and miniature tornadoes. If the car touches them, the player loses control for a short time. Driving into a wall at high speed or falling from one of the bridges destroys the car, but a helicopter will appear and replace it.

The car can be customized by collecting wrenches that lie on the track. The player can exchange three of them for improved traction, better acceleration or higher top speed.

== Ports ==
Super Sprint (non-arcade reviews)

Review scores
Publication	Score
Crash	6/10
Sinclair User	7/10
Your Sinclair	5/10

Championship Sprint (non-arcade reviews)

Review scores
Publication	Score
Crash	4/10
Sinclair User	7/10
Your Sinclair	6/10

Super Sprint was ported to the Amstrad CPC, Atari ST, Commodore 64 and ZX Spectrum in 1987 by British publisher Electric Dreams Software. An unlicensed port was released in 1989 by Tengen, a subsidiary of Atari, for the Nintendo Entertainment System; it was adapted by Japanese company Altron as a licensed title for the Japanese market in 1991.

== Reception ==
In Japan, Game Machine listed Super Sprint as the second most successful upright/cockpit arcade unit of August 1986. It became Japan's eighth highest-grossing upright/cockpit arcade game during the latter half of 1986, and the ninth highest-grossing upright/cockpit of the year. It was later Japan's tenth highest-grossing upright/cockpit of 1987.

In 1996, Next Generation magazine ranked the arcade version number 59 on their list of the "Top 100 Games of All Time"; they said that while the massive understeer in the game is highly unrealistic, it adds a sense of urgency to the gameplay.

== Legacy ==
Championship Sprint

Later in 1986, Championship Sprint was released; it is almost identical, but with different tracks, and with a standard-size two-player cabinet instead of Super Sprint's wide three-player cabinet. It was ported to the ZX Spectrum, Amstrad CPC, and Commodore 64.

Badlands is a post-apocalyptic re-theming of Super Sprint released in arcades by Atari Games in 1990. It adds weapons to vehicles.

=== Re-releases ===
A Game Boy Advance version was released along with Spy Hunter in a dual-game pack in 2005.

Super Sprint is included in the compilation Midway Arcade Treasures for the GameCube, PlayStation 2, Xbox, and Windows. Its sequel, Championship Sprint, was released for the same systems in Midway Arcade Treasures 2, and as a downloadable game for the PlayStation 3. Both games are also part of the 2012 compilation Midway Arcade Origins for the PlayStation 3 and Xbox 360.

In 2016, Super Sprint was re-released in the Lego Dimensions Midway Arcade Level Pack.
