= Spy Hunter =

1983 video game

- Arcade cabinet side art
- Developer: Bally Midway (Note: NES version developed by Sunsoft.)
- Publishers: WW: Bally Midway (arcade); EU: U.S. Gold (computers)
- Designer: George Gomez
- Composer: Bob Libbe; Michael Bartlow; Neil Falconer: NES Naoki Kodaka
- Series: Spy Hunter
- Platform: Arcade: Amstrad CPC, Atari 2600, Atari 8-bit, BBC Micro, ZX Spectrum, C64, Apple II, ColecoVision, IBM PC, NES
- Release: November 1983: Arcade; NA: November 1983; EU: March 1984; JP: 1984 2600; October 1984 NES; NA: September 1987
- Genre: Vehicular combat
- Mode: Single-player
- Arcade system: Bally Midway MCR-Scroll

Spy Hunter is a 1983 vehicular combat video game developed and published by Bally Midway for arcades. The game draws inspiration from the James Bond films and was originally supposed to carry the James Bond brand. The object of the game is to drive down roads in the technologically advanced "Interceptor" car and destroy various enemy vehicles with a variety of onboard weapons. The game was produced in both sit-down and standard upright versions, with the latter being more common. The controls consist of a steering wheel in the form of a futuristic aircraft-style yoke with several special-purpose buttons, a two-position stick shift (offering "low" and "high" gears), and a pedal used for acceleration.

Spy Hunter was a commercial success in American arcades, where it was one of the top five highest-grossing arcade games of 1984 and 1985. It was ported to the Atari 2600, Atari 8-bit computers, Amstrad CPC, ZX Spectrum, Commodore 64, Apple II, ColecoVision, MS-DOS, Nintendo Entertainment System, and BBC Micro. Spy Hunter was followed by Spy Hunter II, which added a 3D view and two-player split-screen play, a pinball tie-in, and a successor series of games bearing the Spy Hunter name. In addition, the NES received a sequel titled Super Spy Hunter.

== Gameplay ==
The player has shot an innocent civilian car and is penalized with no points for a short duration.

Spy Hunter is a vertical scrolling driving game with the player in the role of a spy driving an armed sportscar. The object of the game is to travel the freeway destroying as many enemy vehicles as possible while protecting civilian vehicles. The game uses a top-down perspective. Controls consist of a two-position gearshift lever, a floor-mounted accelerator pedal, and a steering yoke with five buttons, and the cabinet also includes a dashboard with status lights.

The game begins with the player driving the fictitious G-6155 Interceptor, using the yoke, pedal, and gearshift to steer and control speed. The car is equipped with a machine gun that has unlimited ammunition and can be fired by pressing and holding the corresponding button on the yoke.

Various enemy vehicles try to destroy the player's car or force it off the road, including a helicopter that drops bombs from overhead. A counter increments the score while the car is moving and on the road. Additional points are earned by destroying enemy vehicles using weapons or forcing them off the road. After an initial lead-in time during which the player has an unlimited supply of cars, the player must earn extra cars by reaching score thresholds. Destroying non-enemy cars halts the score counter for a short while, and no points are scored whenever the player's car is off the road. The car can be destroyed by a hard collision with another vehicle, if it is hit by an enemy weapon (including the craters blasted into the road by the helicopter's bombs), or by running far enough off the roadway (or waterway).

Following periodic forks in the road, the player can enter new regions with different terrain or weather conditions. The player can also acquire special weapons by entering a weapons van, which appears in each new territory and can be periodically summoned by pressing its button on the yoke when its dashboard light is flashing. Available special weapons consist of oil slicks, smoke screens, and surface-to-air missiles; each is controlled by a different button, and the dashboard lights indicate which ones are available at any given time. Special weapons have a limited ammunition supply and are lost whenever the player's car is destroyed.

At certain points, the player will have the option to convert the car into a speedboat for a brief time by driving through a boathouse; at others, the player will be forced to make the transition. Enemy boats can attack from in front or behind, and the helicopter can drop bombs from above. While in speedboat mode, the oil slick becomes a flamethrower, while the smoke screen and missiles remain unchanged.

The game has no ending, and play continues until the player has lost all cars.

== Development ==
Game designer George Gomez drew inspiration for the game from listening to an audio cassette tape of music from James Bond films. He designed the game with Tom Leon, with whom he had worked on Tron. Gomez sketched out the in-game road map on a long scroll of drawing paper and also came up with the idea of the weapons van. Originally the game was to be based directly on James Bond and have the "James Bond Theme" as in-game music, but the license could not be acquired. Instead, an electronic arrangement of Henry Mancini's theme to Peter Gunn plays throughout.

== Reception ==
Reception

Award
Publication	Award
Crash	Crash Smash

In the United States, Spy Hunter topped the RePlay upright arcade cabinet from April to November 1984. It also topped the Play Meter dedicated cabinet charts for street locations in July and November 1984. The game was listed by AMOA as one of the US's top five highest-grossing arcade games of 1984, with AMOA later giving it the award for "most played" arcade video game of 1985 in the United States. In 1995, Flux magazine ranked the arcade version 29th on their list of the "Top 100 Video Games". They praised the game music, controls and gameplay.

Computer and Video Games scored the ColecoVision version 80% in 1989.

== Legacy ==
ColecoVision port

ZX Spectrum version

A pinball machine based on Spy Hunter was released in 1984 by Bally.

The arcade game was ported to the ColecoVision in January 1985.

The original Spy Hunter was followed by an arcade sequel, Spy Hunter II in 1987. It retained the "Peter Gunn" music and incorporated a cooperative two-player mode, but the top-down view was replaced with a perspective from behind and above the car.

After Japanese video game developer Sunsoft ported Spy Hunter to the Nintendo Entertainment System, the company created Battle Formula (japanese: バトルフォーミュラ) with similar gameplay in 1991. Sunsoft America signed a deal with Bally Midway to release it outside Japan as Super Spy Hunter.

The series was reprised in 2001 with SpyHunter developed by Paradigm Entertainment and published by Midway Games for the PlayStation 2, Xbox, GameCube, Game Boy Advance, and Microsoft Windows. A sequel developed by Angel Studios was released in 2003. Another reboot of the series was developed by TT Fusion for the Nintendo 3DS and PlayStation Vita and released by Warner Bros. Interactive in October 2012.

Spy Hunter was cloned as Major Motion, released by Microdeal for the Atari ST in 1986. Agent Intercept (2019) for Apple Arcade is an homage to Spy Hunter.

In the 2015 toys-to-life video game Lego Dimensions, the Midway Arcade level pack includes a buildable Lego G-6155 Interceptor. A playable emulation of the arcade version is also included as part of the pack. The player character from Spy Hunter also appears as part of a sidequest where the player has to destroy 20 cars in the Super Sprint racetrack.

The 2022 video game Gotham Knights includes a playable emulated version of the game as an easter egg.

=== Re-releases ===
Spy Hunter was included in Midway's Greatest Arcade Hits: Volume 1 for Nintendo 64; Midway Arcade Treasures, a 2003 compilation of arcade games available for the GameCube, PlayStation 2, Xbox, and Microsoft Windows; Midway Arcade Treasures: Extended Play for PlayStation Portable; and Midway Arcade Origins, a 2012 compilation available for PlayStation 3 and Xbox 360.

=== In popular culture ===
- In the Murder, She Wrote episode titled "Hit, Run and Homicide", Jessica realizes the solution to the episode's mystery while playing Spy Hunter in the Cabot Cove grocery store.
- "Dev Hunter", a game made in the style of Spy Hunter is included as an Easter egg in the first release of Microsoft Excel 2000. It requires DirectX to work. Shortly after Excel 2000's release, Microsoft officially banned Easter eggs from its non-game software.
- In the Robot Chicken episode "Dragon Nuts", a spoof of Spy Hunter is featured in the sketch "Omaha's Number 1 News Team". The news station's traffic copter films two police cruisers in pursuit of the sports car from Spy Hunter, which failed to yield for a routine traffic stop. The sports car causes the cruisers to crash using its smoke screen generator, boards the weapon truck, equips itself with its surface-to-air missile launcher, uses it to destroy a helicopter, and the driver, tailed by several more police cruisers, escapes in a speedboat.
- Spy Hunter is parodied in the Teen Titans Go! episode "Video Game References", as when it is Cyborg's turn to use the virtual reality system, he goes inside an arcade game called Pie Hunter, whose name is a reference to Spy Hunter.

== Film adaptation ==
In the summer of 2003, Universal Pictures acquired the rights to the arcade game Spy Hunter from Midway Games. The following September, Universal signed actor Dwayne "The Rock" Johnson to star in the film adaptation based on the game. Screenwriters Michael Brandt and Derek Haas were hired to write the screenplay, though a director had not been decided at the time. Spy Hunter was slated to begin its budgeted $90 million production in spring 2004 in time for a summer 2005 release. In January 2004, screenwriters Mark Swift and Damian Shannon replaced the original writing duo to rewrite the script, with production slated for June. By May, Universal Pictures acquired director John Woo to helm the project. In the same month, the previous screenwriters were replaced by screenwriter Zak Penn to rewrite the script once more. By August, production had been delayed, pushing Spy Hunter back to be released in summer 2006. In April 2005, Penn was replaced by screenwriter Stuart Beattie to rewrite the script. By May, however, director John Woo left the project due to scheduling conflicts. In August, Johnson said the film was still developing without a director. Pre-production work was underway with designs such as the morphing Interceptor vehicle driven by Alex Decker. Production was eventually halted for the time being, and Dwayne Johnson was detached from the project.

In May 2007, Paul W. S. Anderson was hired to replace Woo as the director with an all-new script unrelated to Nowhere to Run. He left the project a year later due to his commitment to Death Race 2 as a producer. In February 2013, Warner Bros. (which took over the assets of Midway, including the Spy Hunter game franchise) and their motion picture department, which also took over theatrical distribution rights, announced that Ruben Fleischer was brought on board to direct from a screenplay by Carter Blanchard. In November 2015, Blanchard was replaced with the duo Neal Greaves and Sam Chalsen while Dan Lin and Roy Lee were set to produce the film. Whether Fleischer was still on board to direct remains to be seen. Nothing has been reported since, and the project is believed to have been cancelled.

== See also ==
- Bump 'n' Jump (1982), another game where the player can bump vehicles off the road.
- Roadblasters (1987), a later driving/combat video game also popular in arcades.
