= Smash TV =

1990 video game

- Arcade flyer
- Developer: Williams Electronics (Note: NES and SNES versions developed by Beam Software; Genesis/Mega Drive, Master System, Game Gear, ZX Spectrum and Commodore 64 versions developed by Probe Software.)
- Publishers: Williams Electronics; Consoles; Acclaim Entertainment (Note: Released under the Flying Edge brand name on Sega systems); Home computers Ocean Software
- Designer: Eugene Jarvis
- Programmer: Mark Turmell
- Artists: John Tobias; Tim Coman
- Composer: Jon Hey: NES, Super NES Marshall Parker Amiga, ST Tony Williams C64 Jeroen Tel Genesis/Mega Drive, Game Gear Matt Furniss
- Platform: Arcade: NES, Amiga, Amstrad CPC, Atari ST, Commodore 64, ZX Spectrum, Super NES, Genesis/Mega Drive, Game Gear, Master System
- Release: April 1990: Arcade; NA: April 1990 NES; NA: September 1991 Amiga, Atari ST, C64, CPC, ZX Spectrum; EU: November 1991 Super NES; NA: February 1992; PAL: February 18, 1993 Genesis/Mega Drive; NA: August 1992; EU: November 19, 1992 Game Gear; NA: September 1992; EU: December 17, 1992 Master System; EU: November 5, 1992
- Genre: Twin-stick shooter
- Modes: Single-player, multiplayer
- Arcade system: Midway Y Unit

Smash TV is an arcade video game developed and published by Williams Electronics in 1990. It was designed by Eugene Jarvis and programmed by Mark Turmell with similar twin-stick shooter gameplay to Jarvis' 1982 game Robotron: 2084. Versions released for the Super Nintendo Entertainment System, Sega Genesis, Master System, and Game Gear were titled Super Smash TV.

== Plot ==
The game takes place in a dystopian televised game show, described as "the most violent game show of all time", in the year 1999. One or two contestants survive by shooting waves of attackers while collecting money, temporary power-ups, and various prizes such as toasters and VCRs. After an arena has been cleared of adversaries, the contestants choose an exit, which leads to another room. One room contains an end-of-level boss; defeating this boss enables the players to progress to the next level. The show is overseen by a sadistic host, whose verbal interjections frequently punctuate gameplay, including "Total carnage! I love it!", "Big money! Big prizes! I love it!", and "I'd buy that for a dollar!". The last level of the game ends with a showdown against the final boss, revealed to be the host himself.

In two-player mode, the game is cooperative, and each player is allowed to help his companion. However, at the end of each level, the player who collected the most cash and prizes receives an extra reward. The arcade game has multiple difficulty settings and a pay-to-continue option to allow players to continue gameplay after losing all their lives. A bonus feature was added after release, allowing players to collect keys throughout the levels to reach the "Pleasure Dome". Several gameplay themes were borrowed from dystopian films such as RoboCop and The Running Man.

== Gameplay ==
A room in the first level. The blue player character is right of center (arcade).

The gameplay is similar to that of Eugene Jarvis' earlier Robotron: 2084, with twin-joystick controls and a series of single-screen arenas. While most of the enemies in Robotron are visible at the start of a fight, in Smash TV they enter the arena in waves.

In each arena, players shoot hordes of enemies that enter via doorways on the four walls, while collecting money, temporary power-ups, weapons, and gift-wrapped prizes. When all enemies have been killed, one or more exits appear, leading to additional arenas. After completing the first arena in a level, a map shows the overall arrangement of the level and the location of the end-of-level boss. Players cannot backtrack to previously completed areas.

Among the game's items are keys. If enough are collected, players can access a bonus level called the Pleasure Dome where players can collect hundreds of blue bikini-clad blonde and buxom "babes" in a similar fashion to the other prizes in the game.

== Development ==
In a 1995 interview with GamePro magazine, programmer Mark Turmell recounted: "When Hasbro pulled the plug on an interactive movie project I was working on, I went to Williams to design coin-op games. I moved to Chicago, hired John Tobias, and together we did our first coin-op, Smash T.V." The announcer in the game is voiced by sound designer Paul Heitsch. The script was written by the game's composer and sound designer Jon Hey.

The arcade game originally shipped without the Pleasure Dome bonus level implemented, although dialogue in the game alluded to its existence. The design team excluded the level from the game's initial release, fearing that not enough players would make it to the end of the game. However, many players who reached the end of the game lodged complaints with arcade operators after being unable to complete the final level. Upon being informed of these complaints, Williams sent a revised game to arcades that included the Pleasure Dome level.

== Ports ==
Smash TV was converted to multiple home video game consoles: the Nintendo Entertainment System, Super NES, Game Gear, Master System, and Genesis/Mega Drive. British software development company Ocean Software published versions for ZX Spectrum, Commodore 64, Amstrad CPC, Atari ST, and Amiga.

On some home systems, players have the option to use a directional pad on the second controller to control the direction the character will shoot on-screen. Using this option for both players requires a multitap peripheral. The dual control aspect of the game works particularly well on the SNES, as its four main buttons, A, B, X and Y, are laid out like a D-pad, enabling the player to shoot in one direction while running in another.

== Reception ==
Reviews (home conversions)

Aggregate score
| Aggregator | Score |
|---|---|
| GameRankings | 82.25% (SNES) |

Review scores
| Publication | Score |
|---|---|
| ACE | (AMI): 895/1000 |
| Amstrad Action | 96% |
| Crash | (ZX): 97% |
| Computer and Video Games | (SMD): 83/100 (SMS): 38/100; SNES: 92/100 |
| Electronic Gaming Monthly | 8/10, 9/10, 8/10, 9/10 (SNES) |
| Mean Machines | SNES: 92% |
| Mean Machines Sega | SMD & SMS: 88/100 |
| Sinclair User | ZX: 94% |
| Your Sinclair | ZX: 92% |
| MicroHobby (ES) | ZX: 89% |
| MegaTech | SMD: 70% |
| Mega | SMD: 37% |
| Sega Master Force | SMD: 44% |

Awards
| Publication | Award |
|---|---|
| Crash | Crash Smash! |
| Sinclair User | SU Silver |
| Amstrad Action | 6th best game of all time |

Smash T.V. was generally well-received by critics and the public. It received the "most innovative game" award from the Amusement & Music Operators Association (AMOA) in 1990. The various ports of Smash TV to home entertainment and computer systems received positive to mixed reviews.

The Amiga version scored 895/1,000 in a review by Advanced Computer Entertainment magazine, and the Spectrum magazine CRASH awarded the ZX version 97%, dubbing it a "Crash Smash".

=== Accolades ===
In 1997 Electronic Gaming Monthly listed Smash TV as the 6th best arcade game of all time. In 2004, Smash TV was inducted into GameSpot's list of the greatest games of all time. In 1995, British game magazine Total! rated Super Smash TV 51st on its "Top 100 SNES Games" list. In 1996, GamesMaster ranked the game 84th on their "Top 100 Games of All Time" list.

== Legacy ==
The 1992 Williams arcade game Total Carnage, named after one of the catchphrases of the antagonistic video game host in Smash TV, shares many gameplay elements with Smash TV and was also programmed by Turmell, but is not a sequel.

=== Re-releases ===
Smash TV was included in Arcade Party Pak, a compilation of six arcade games released for the PlayStation in 1999.

It is also part of the Midway Arcade Treasures collection, which is available for Microsoft Windows, Nintendo GameCube, Xbox and PlayStation 2 and was released in 2003. These versions give the player the option to save high scores. Smash TV is also part of the 2012 video game compilation Midway Arcade Origins.

Smash TV was made available for download through Microsoft's Xbox Live Arcade service on the Xbox 360, and was the first version of the game to officially allow two players to play the game online. It was delisted from the service in February 2010 following the dissolution of Midway Games.
