= Tapper (video game) =

1984 video game

- North American arcade flyer
- Developer: Marvin Glass and Associates
- Publishers: NA/EU: Bally Midway; JP: Sega
- Programmers: Steve Meyer; Elaine Ditton
- Artist: Scott Morrison
- Composer: Rick Hicaro
- Platform: Arcade: Apple II, Atari 2600, Atari 8-bit, ColecoVision, Commodore 64, ZX Spectrum, MSX, Amstrad CPC, BBC Micro, IBM PC, Palm OS
- Release: February 1984: Arcade; NA: February 1984; JP: March 1984; EU: 1984 2600; October 1984 ColecoVision; Early 1985
- Genre: Action
- Modes: Single-player, multiplayer
- Arcade system: Bally Midway MCR III

Tapper, also known as Root Beer Tapper, is a 1983 action video game developed by Marvin Glass and Associates and published by Bally Midway for arcades; in Japan, it was distributed by Sega. The game puts the player in the shoes of a bartender who must serve eager, thirsty patrons (before their patience expires) while collecting empty mugs and tips.

Originally sponsored by Anheuser-Busch, the American arcade version features a Budweiser motif. It was intended to be sold to bars, with cabinets sporting a brass rail footrest and drink holders. Early machines had game controllers that were actual Budweiser beer tap handles, which were later replaced by smaller, plastic versions with the Budweiser logo on them. The re-themed Root Beer Tapper followed in 1984, which was developed specifically for arcades because the original version was construed as advertising alcohol to minors. Shortly after its original release, another version of Tapper was released in Japan, replacing the Budweiser beer references with ones for Japanese beer brand Suntory. Despite retaining the original beer theme, it used the same Budweiser censorship as Root Beer Tapper.

== Gameplay ==
The controls consist of a four-position joystick and a tap handle. The game screen features four bars, each with a keg at one end and a door at the other. Customers enter through the doors and slowly advance toward the kegs, demanding service. The player controls a bartender who must pour drinks and slide them down the bar for the customers to catch. Pushing the joystick up or down instantly moves the bartender to the keg at the next bar in the chosen direction, with the top and bottom of the screen wrapping around to one another, while pushing left or right causes him to run along the bar where he is stationed. When the tap handle is pulled down, the bartender instantly moves to the keg (if he is not already standing there) and fills a mug; releasing it causes him to slide the mug along the bar.

In Tapper, the player is a bartender serving drinks to customers. The Budweiser logo is on the far wall.

Root Beer Tapper replaces the bartender with a soda jerk serving non-alcoholic root beer.

Customers slide back toward the doors upon catching a full mug, and they disappear through the doors if they are close enough. If they are too far away from a door, they stop, consume the drink, and resume their advance while sliding the empty mug back toward the keg. Customers occasionally leave tips on the bar, which the player can pick up for bonus points. Collecting a tip causes a group of female dancers to appear for a few seconds, distracting a portion of the customers so that they will stop advancing. However, distracted customers cannot catch drinks, and any customers who are either drinking or being pushed back at the start of the dancers' show will never be distracted.

One life is lost when any of the following occurs:

- The player fails to catch an empty mug before it falls off the keg end of a bar and breaks.
- A full mug slides to the door end of a bar without being caught, where it falls and breaks.
- Any customer reaches the keg end of a bar, whereupon they grab the bartender and slide him across the bar out the door.

Each screen is completed when the bar is completely emptied of customers. The bartender then pours/consumes a drink of his own with humorous results involving the empty mug, such as getting it stuck on his head or stubbing his toe when he tries to kick it. As the game progresses, the customers appear more frequently, move faster along the bar, and are pushed back shorter distances when they catch their drinks. In addition, the maximum number of customers per bar gradually increases until every bar can have up to four customers at a time.

The player proceeds through four levels, each with its own theme and appropriately dressed customers, and must complete a set number of screens to advance from one level to the next. The levels are:

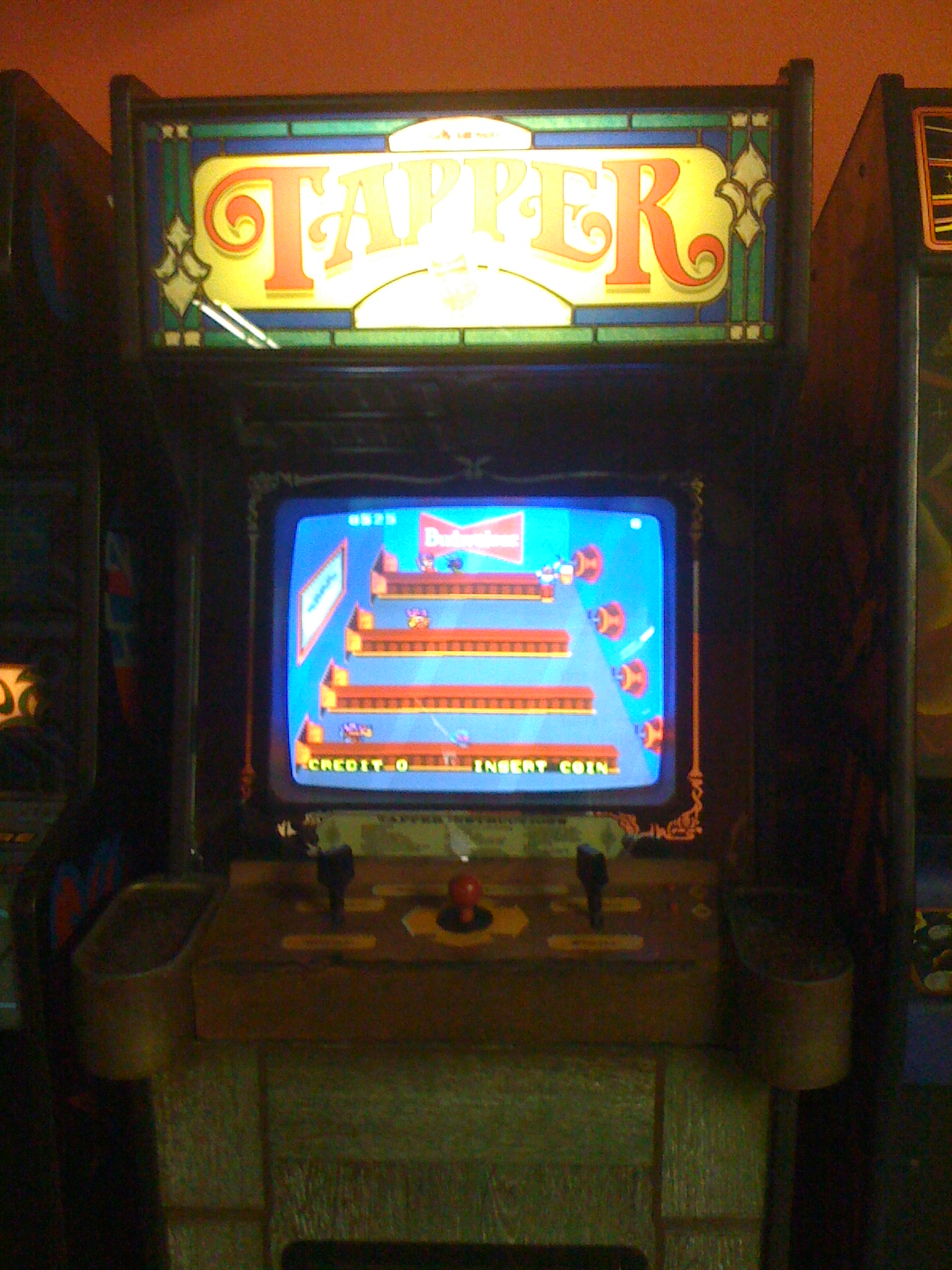
An upright cabinet

1. A western saloon with cowboys (2 screens)
2. A sports bar with athletes (3 screens)
3. A punk rock bar with punk rockers (4 screens)
4. An outer-space bar with aliens (4 screens)

A bonus round is played after the end of each level, in which six cans of beer (or root beer) are placed on the bar. A masked figure shakes five of the cans, then pounds the bar to shuffle them. Choosing the one unshaken can awards bonus points, while choosing any other results in the bartender being sprayed in the face; in the latter case, the unshaken can flashes briefly to indicate its position.

After completing all four levels, the player returns to the start of the sequence and continues the game at a higher difficulty level.

== Music ==
Music and sound effects for the arcade version of Tapper were created by Rick Hicaro of Marvin Glass & Associates. He used a Synclavier II synthesizer running with custom software written by Richard Ditton. The system interfaced directly to the arcade game system so sounds were true to the capabilities of the hardware.

The game's score includes "Oh! Susanna" (composed by Stephen Foster), "Buffalo Gals" (traditional American folk song), the Budweiser theme, and "Galop Infernal" by Jacques Offenbach. The rest of the music was written by Rick Hicaro.

== Ports ==
Atari 8-bit version

Tapper was ported to the Apple II, Atari 8-bit computers, Atari 5200, Atari 2600, BBC Micro, ColecoVision, Commodore 64, MSX, ZX Spectrum, IBM PC, and Amstrad CPC. Most of the home versions of Tapper featured the Mountain Dew logo, while the ZX Spectrum and Amstrad CPC versions had the Pepsi logo, but they retained the bartender character of the original arcade game instead of the soda jerk in Root Beer Tapper.

The ColecoVision version was released in 1984.

The Root Beer Tapper version also appears on the Midway Legacy Edition Arcade1Up cabinet.

An unofficial port for Commodore Amiga has been released in 2023.

== Reception ==
Reception

Awards
Publication	Award
Crash	Crash Smash
Sinclair User	SU Classic

In Japan, Game Machine listed Tapper as the most successful table arcade unit of March 1984, tied with 10-Yard Fight and Vs. Tennis.

Compute!'s Gazette called the Commodore 64 version of Tapper "one of the most addictive games we've seen lately ... not only fun to play, but also immensely challenging, graphically entertaining, and full of action". The magazine stated that "it's a very well-designed strategy game", and concluded that it was "near the top in entertainment value". Sinclair User gave the game a SU Classic award.

== Legacy ==
The art style is almost identical to a previous game called Domino Man, and the following game Timber. In fact, the main character in Timber is a rework of the main character in Tapper. The art is based on Mike Ferris, an artist who taught Scott Morrison art.

=== Re-releases ===
Root Beer Tapper has been included in several compilations. It was in the Nintendo 64 version of Midway's Greatest Arcade Hits, Arcade's Greatest Hits: The Midway Collection 2 for the PlayStation, Midway Arcade Treasures for PlayStation 2, Xbox, GameCube, and Microsoft Windows, and Midway Arcade Origins for PlayStation 3 and Xbox 360.

A reinterpretation of the game for mobile devices, Tapper World Tour, was released in 2011.

=== Clones ===
Novasoft published a clone in 1984 called Brew Master for the TRS-80 Color Computer. A slightly altered version of Tapper appears as the Milk Bar minigame in Barnyard (2006). A similar version is on the virtual pet website Neopets as one of the minigames for the Altador Cup event.

A clone called Nuka Tapper is included in Fallout 76 as a minigame with Fallout-themed graphics.

=== In popular culture ===
Tapper is one of the games included in Disney's 2012 film Wreck-It Ralph and its 2018 sequel Ralph Breaks the Internet with the bartender voiced by Maurice LaMarche. The version of the game featured in both the films is a combination of the Budweiser and the root beer version.

=== High score ===
Gregory Erway set the tournament world record on June 5, 2005 with a score of 3,162,125 (first 5 men of game). William Rosa set the marathon world record on February 16, 2019 with a score of 14,826,200.
