= Dave Akers =

Video game designer

Dave Akers is a video game programmer and designer who worked on the M Network ports of BurgerTime, Bump 'n' Jump, and Star Strike for the Atari 2600. He co-designed the 1989 arcade game Klax with Mark Stephen Pierce and worked on Escape from the Planet of the Robot Monsters.

Akers prototyped Klax in AmigaBASIC in just a few weeks, then ported it line-by-line to C.

As of the spring of 2006, Akers was working as an English teacher in Numazu, Japan.

In 2013, Dave Akers developed Paddle Party, a game for Intellivision released by Elektronite.
