= Toobin' =

1988 video game

- Arcade flyer
- Developer: Atari Games
- Publisher: Atari Games
- Designer: Milt Loper
- Programmer: Dennis Harper
- Artists: Will Noble; Mark West; Deborah Short
- Composer: Brad Fuller
- Platform: Arcade: Amiga, Commodore 64, Atari ST, Amstrad CPC, NES, MS-DOS, Game Boy Color, ZX Spectrum, MSX
- Release: Arcade: NA: June 1988; NES: NA: December 1989
- Genre: Action
- Modes: Single-player, multiplayer

Toobin' is a 1988 action game developed and published by Tengen for Atari Games and arcades. Based on the recreational activity of tubing, it sees players traveling down the Colorado, Yukon, Nile, Styx, Canals of Mars and Jurassic, steering around obstacles (whirlpools, dinosaur tails, bullets, and more) and throwing cans at such enemies as alligators, hunters, and cavemen.

The game has been ported to various home consoles and computers, and later emulated as part of other video games.

== Gameplay ==
Bif and Jet tubing down the Colorado river. Bif and Jet's score and lives, as well as the river they are currently riding on, are shown in the interface at the top of the screen.

Toobin' is a vertically scrolling action game based on the recreational activity of tubing. The player controls either Bif or Jet, identified by the colors red and yellow respectively, as they travel down rivers. Although there is no ending so to speak, the objective of the game is to travel through five rivers in order to reach an end point. Upon completing the objective, the player is set back to the beginning to complete the cycle again.

On each river, players must contend with various obstacles that stand in their way. Along the way, the player can pass through gates and collect treasure chests to gain points, as well as grabbing cans which can be used to stun certain obstacles on the side of the river.

== Legacy ==
The game is included as part of Midway Arcade Treasures and Arcade Party Pak, where it was given a remixed soundtrack. It was also included in the 2012 compilation Midway Arcade Origins. The game is one of the 23 arcade games that are included with the Midway Arcade Level Pack for Lego Dimensions, unlocked by using the hidden Arcade Dock in the level "Follow The Lego Brick Road". It is also an included title on the Arcade1Up Midway Legacy Edition cabinet.
