= Tubing (recreation) =

Riding on an inner tube as a recreational activity

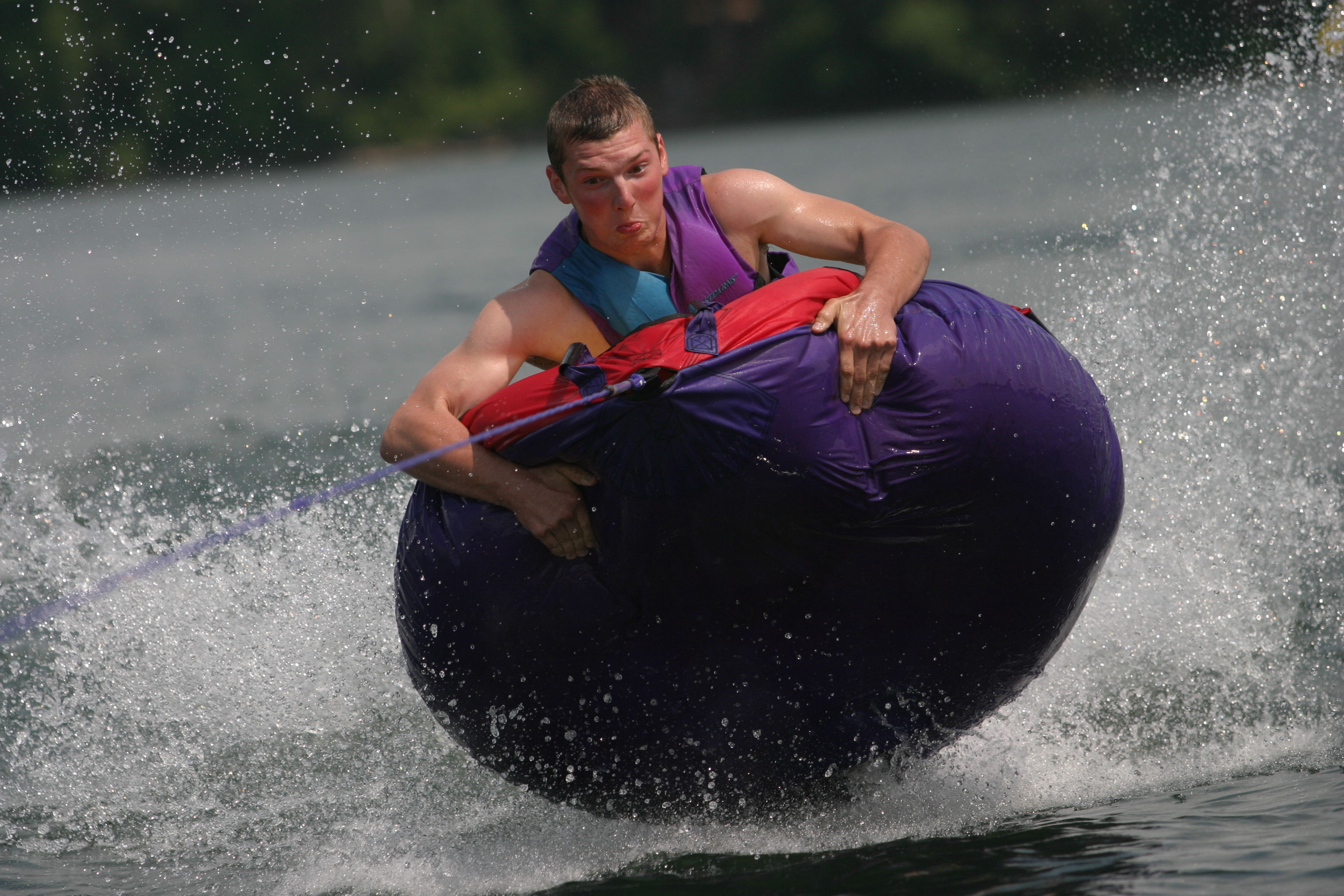
Towed tubing on Pleasant Lake, Cass County, Minnesota. Riders can often become airborne while passing over waves or wake from the motor boat or personal watercraft, August 2006

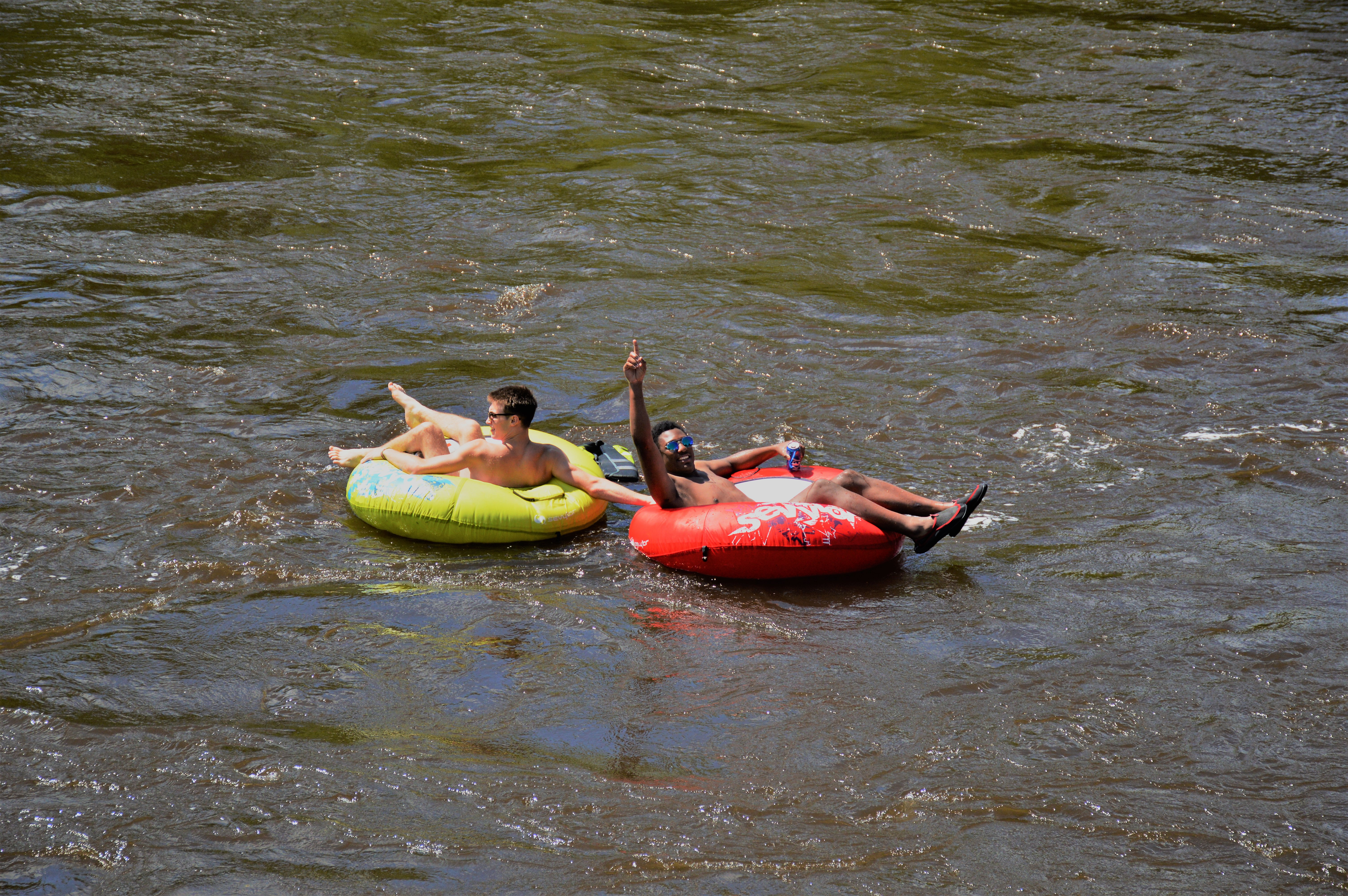
Water tubers in the Lehigh River in Pennsylvania, June 2020

Tubing, also known as inner tubing, bumper tubing, towed tubing, biscuiting (in New Zealand), or kite tubing, is a recreational activity where an individual rides on top of an inner tube, either on water, snow, or through the air. The tubes themselves are also known as "donuts" or "biscuits" due to their shape.

== Variations ==
=== Water ===
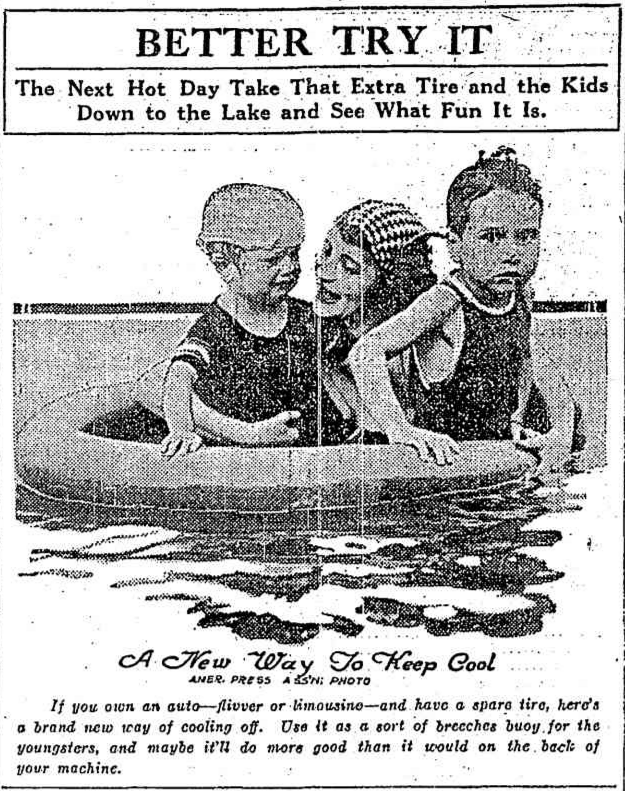
A mother holds two children in an automobile inner tube floating on an unidentified body of water in 1916.

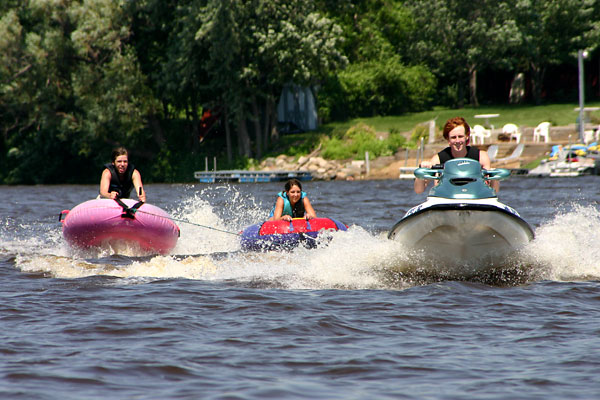
Towed tubing behind a personal watercraft on the Mississippi River

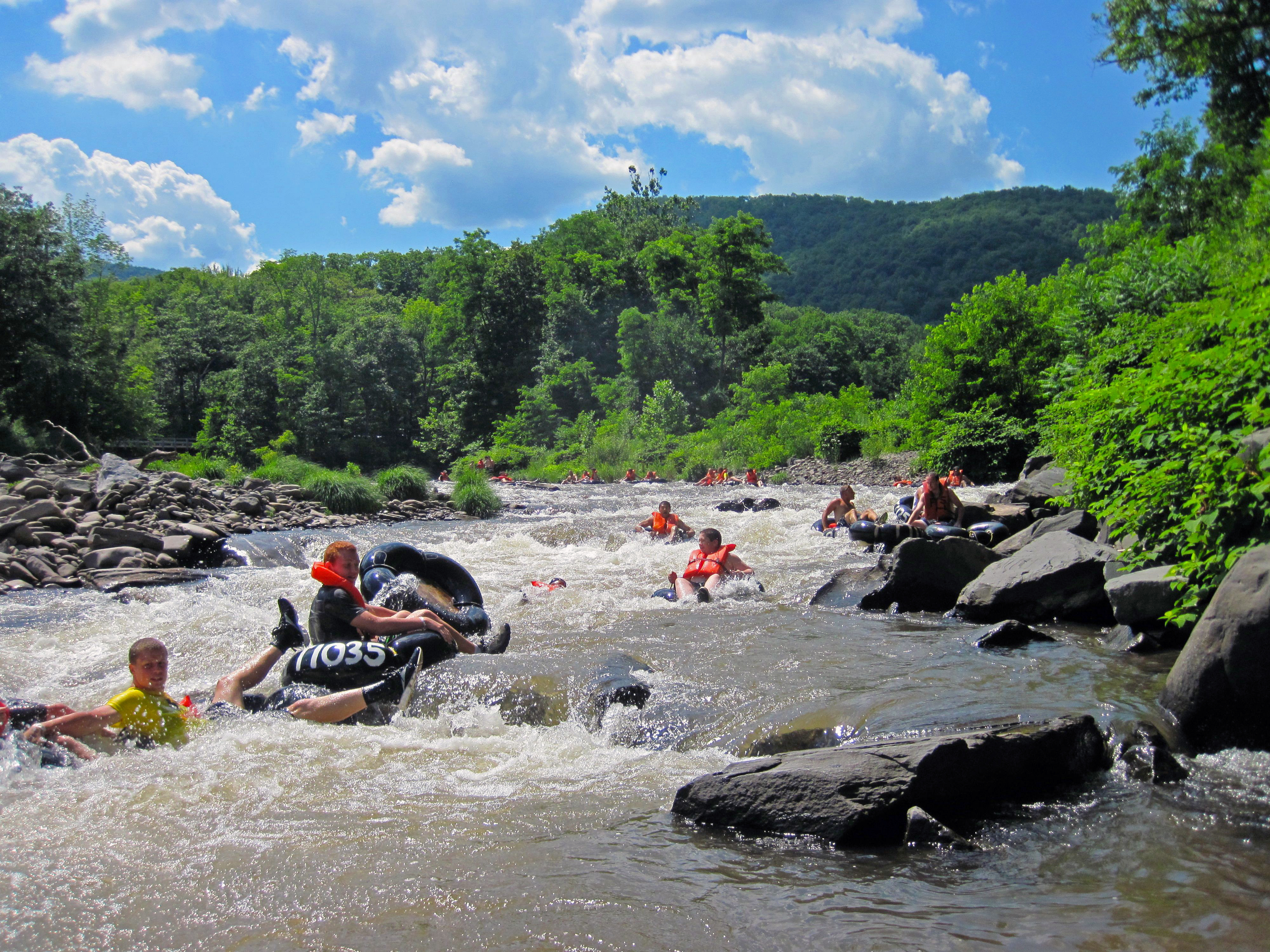
Free-floating tubers on Esopus Creek in the Catskill Mountains of New York

Tubing on water generally consists of two forms: towed and free-floating, also known as river tubing. According to Time Magazine, tubing was purportedly invented on the Black River in Missouri by Jan & Harriet Wright of Poplar Bluff, MO sometime in the middle of the 20th century, but examples of the practice were published as early as 1916, when the popularization of the automobile meant a large supply of rubber inner tubes was available to the general public.

Towed tubing usually takes place on a large body of water such as a lake or river. One or more tube riders (often called "tubers") tether their tubes to a powered watercraft such as a motor boat or a personal watercraft. The riders are then towed through the water by the watercraft.

In free floating tubing, the tube riders are untethered and often conveyed by the current of a waterway. Tubers paddle with their hands and often use webbed gloves to steer. Tubes can be outfitted with tube covers or 'skins'. These covers are fabric, and cover the bottom of the tube, the sides, and have a skirt that covers the inner diameter, while leaving room for the tuber to sit. Covers can be altered with pockets, can holders and have handles for the tuber to hold on to. It is strongly discouraged to tie anything to the tube or use ropes of any kind as a tuber can get bound or wrapped in them and potentially drown. The Esopus Creek in the Catskill Mountains, New York is a common place for tubing, starting in Phoenicia and proceeding eastward. As in all watersports tubers should wear appropriate safety gear such as life vests, protective water shoes and helmets. Whitewater tubing can be fun and exhilarating, the size of the tube allows a tuber to ride the river in an unencumbered manner not found in rafting or kayaking. Tubers can employ the use of such items as dry boxes and mesh bags to carry small personal items and pack out trash, cans and bottles from their trip.

Popular riverside tube rentals normally warn against glass due to riverside dangers. Some law enforcement offices have prohibited kegs which were popularly chilled in metal tubs harnessed within larger tubes.

Major water parks often have specially designed courses for tubing called lazy rivers. These may consist of a circular, artificial river on which riders are conveyed or a linear course such as a water slide.

=== Snow ===
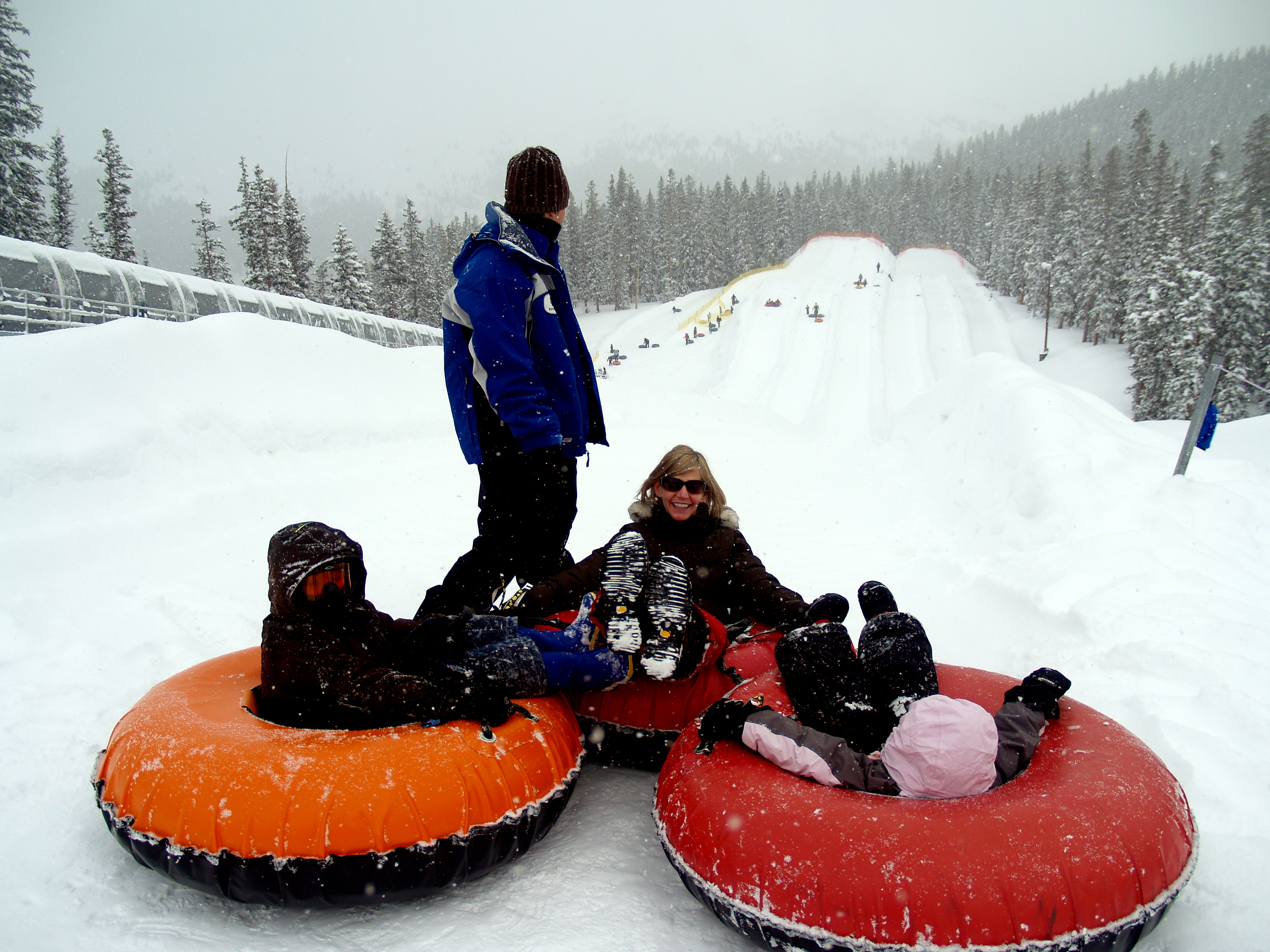
Adventure Point at Keystone Resort. The operator looks to ensure the people below clear the run safely before launching this family down one of the highest tubing hills sitting at 11,640 ft. On the left is their state of the art magic carpet used to deliver the tubers back up the run from the bottom.

Snow tubing is rumored to have begun as far back as the 1820s in the Alpine Mountains. Tubing on snow is a wintertime activity that is similar to sledding. This kind of tubing is almost always performed on a hill or slope, using gravity to propel the rider to the bottom of the grade. The rider often returns to the top of the slope with the tube to repeat the process. The low amount of friction between most tubes and snow allows tubers to reach considerable speeds while riding, especially on steep slopes. Because of the circular shape of snow tubes, controlling the course and speed of a tube while riding on snow is extremely difficult. While a sled rider can drag their arms on the snow to brake or steer to a degree, attempting this on a tube will often cause the tube to spin. This lack of control has led to injuries, some serious, when riders have struck obstacles such as trees while tubing on snow.

Some ski resorts offer courses devoted solely to tubing. Such courses often have slopes or barriers on the periphery to guide the tubes along a safe course. Motorized pulley towlines are often used to tow riders and their tube back to the top of the course after riding to the bottom. Adventure Point At Keystone Resort in Colorado offers snow tubing late into the summer. Their elevation has been known to provide enough snow to last through the month of July. Steamboat Springs, Colorado ski mountain offers night snow tubing in ski season.

It is also possible to tow a tube through the snow behind a snowmobile. This is similar to towed tubing on water, only the watercraft is replaced by a snowmobile and the water with snow-covered ground.

=== Kite tubing ===
A more recent variant of towed tubing is "kite tubing". When tubes being towed on water reach high speeds, they may take flight. This is because the body of the tube acts as an airfoil and creates lift. In this way, the tube becomes a kite. A tube's ability to achieve and maintain flight depends on a number of factors including the speed at which the tube is traveling, the shape and size of the tube, the weight of the rider, and how the tube itself is oriented. The rider often has little or no control over a tube after it takes to the air. This can lead to a violent crash as the rider, with or without the tube, falls back to the surface of the water.

To target thrill seekers, tubes specially designed for kite tubing have been introduced. These tubes may feature channels to allow air to flow through the tube's body, a transparent "window" for the rider to signal the boat operator, as well as more streamlined, aerodynamic designs. U.S. Consumer Product Safety Commission (CPSC).

Related to kite tubing is the kited inflated wing, a stiffened, flexible wing or gas-inflated bladder wing, where a control bar is affixed for the kited person to direct the inflated wing so the dangerous lock-out does not occur. The kited person can have a quick disconnect to release from a towing boat or car if a dangerous angle of tow begins.

=== Summer tubing ===
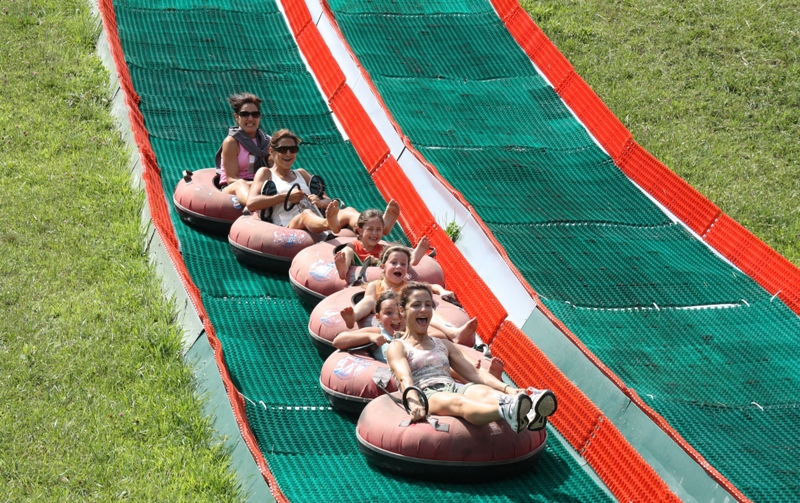
Neveplast summer tubing

Summer tubing is the summer variant of snow tubing. Hard bottom tubes slide down artificial slopes, usually made of special plastic. They can be installed on mountains by ski resorts and can also be found in amusement parks. In Europe, this kind of tubing is primarily produced by Neveplast, Tubingsystem, Mr. Snow, and Sunkid.

An example of a summer tubing venue is the Utah Olympic Park Jumps in Park City, Utah, which hosted the 2002 Winter Olympics ski jumping events (including during the Nordic combined) and is expected to do so again when the Winter Olympics return to Salt Lake City in 2034.

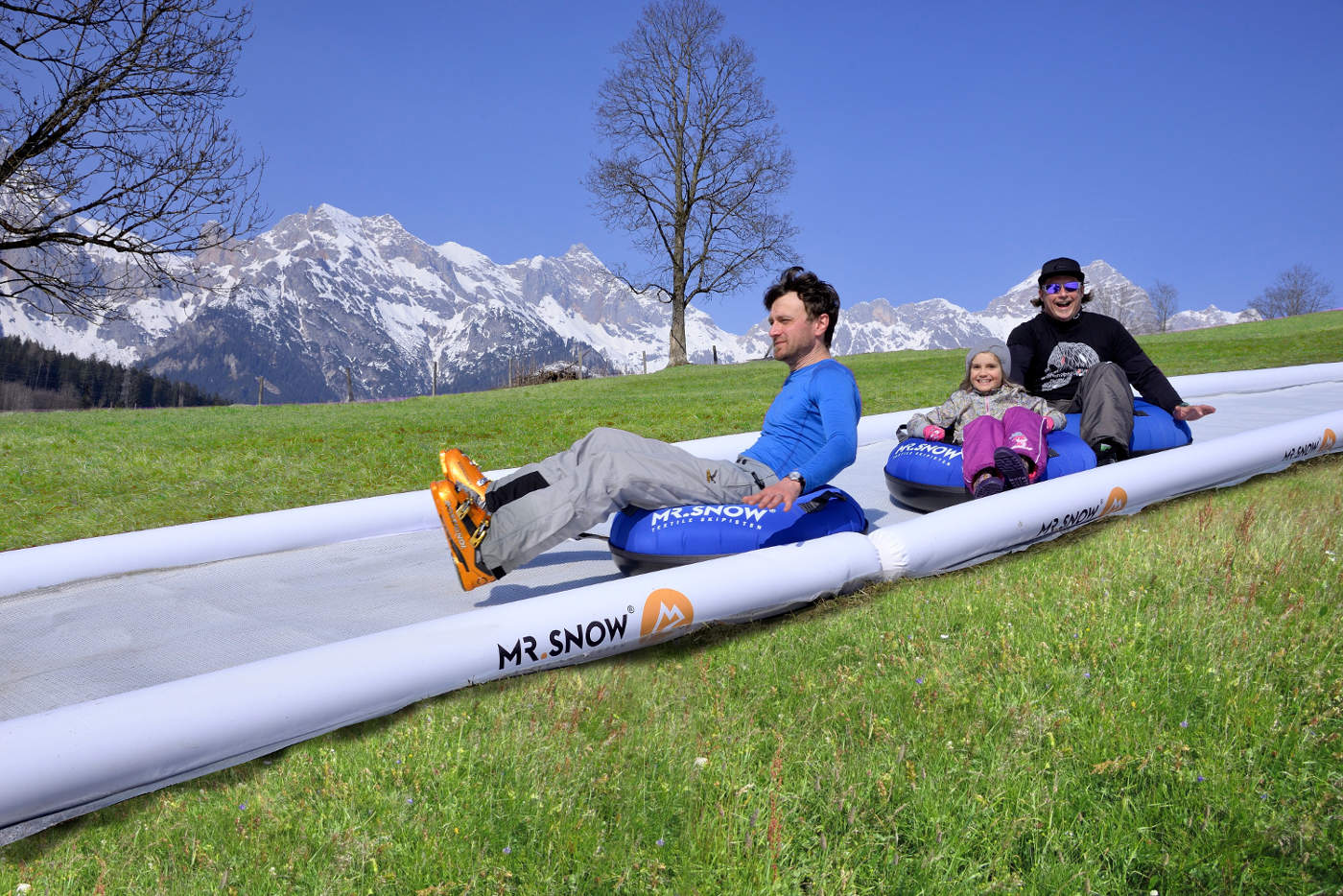
Summer tubing track with Mr. Snow modules

== Equipment ==
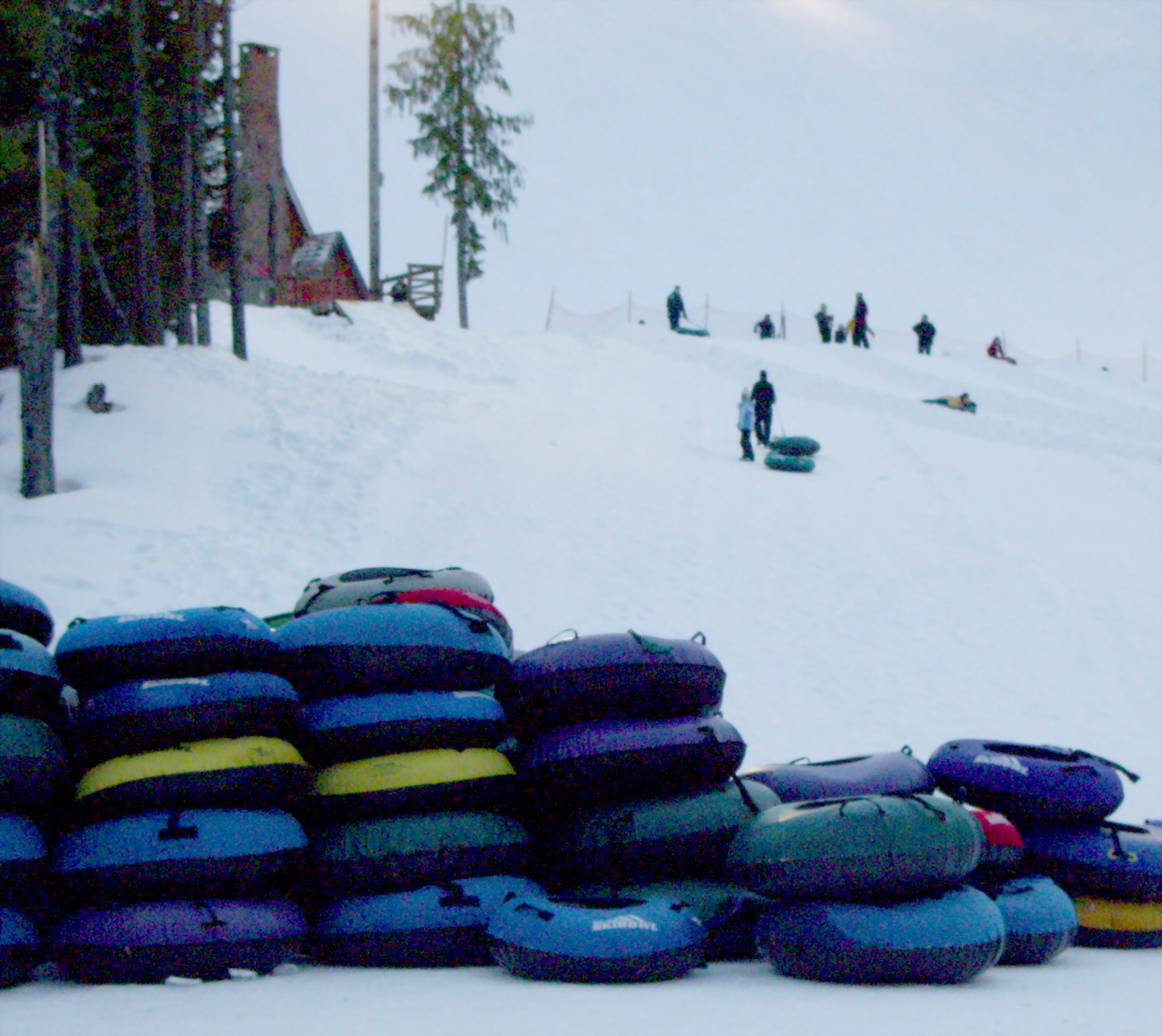
Piles of snow tubes

Tubing can require varying pieces and kinds of equipment depending on the variety of tubing one wishes to engage in.

The one common piece of equipment across all forms of tubing is the tube itself. While tubes vary in construction, all share the general characteristics of being:

- Inflatable
- Made of a thin, flexible, synthetic material such as rubber or PVC plastic
- Donut, disk, or hot dog shaped

=== Water ===
Tubes for use as towables on water are generally not true inner tubes but rather specially designed tubes for the purpose of recreation. These tubes are often fairly durable and come in either donut or disk shapes. A sleeve of synthetic fabric often covers the tube to prevent it from becoming elongated during towing. Such sleeves commonly have handles for the rider to grasp and an anchoring point for the tow line to be attached at.

Towing a tube or tubes also requires a powered watercraft such a motorboat or personal watercraft as well as rope to tether the tubes to such craft.

Tubes used for free-floating tubing have traditionally been true inner tubes, but commercially sold tubes for the same purpose are becoming common place. These tubes are almost always donut-shaped to allow the rider to sit comfortably on their back across the top of the tube with buttocks in the center. This kind of tube rarely has handles or a sleeve and would perform poorly as a towable. Another type of water tube has a wooden panel inserted across the hole in the middle of the tube to prevent rocks in the river popping up into the tube and injuring the rider in shallow water areas.

=== Snow ===
Tubes used for riding on snow are sometimes specially designed tubes with dimpled centers rather than a "donut" hole. This prevents the rider and the tube itself from dragging on the snow. Snow tubes may be designed to have handles.

== Dangers ==
There are many dangers that are associated with tubing regardless of the variation of tubing.

=== Water ===
From 1991 to 2009, towed tubing injuries saw injuries increase at a rate of 250%. This amounted to 7,216 injuries alone in 2009. The increase in injuries is a result of the increase in popularity of the recreational activity. As a result, it is important that proper safety measures are in place. Proper inflation of the tube is especially important. This prevents the body from being caught between the tube and nylon cover that goes over it. With an underinflated tube it is possible for the rider to be caught and dragged under water. Towed tubing also provides dangers if not performed in an open area away from other obstacles such as docks, piers, and other boaters. Injuries can further occur during the ride. In kids, one study found injuries to the head to be common while adults suffered sprains to the knees. This discrepancy between age groups is believed to be a result of younger riders trying to fit more than one person on a tube. There is still danger after riders are flown from the tube. If the boat operator does not disengage the motor when picking up a tube rider from the water, there is a chance that the body of the person in the water could get caught in the motor. This can cause body disfigurement or even death depending on the severity of the injury and the time until proper medical attention is received.

Dangers still exist for water tubing that is not towed tubing. Non-towed water tubing takes place at a slower rate than towed tubing. As a result, tubers are more at risk of water dangers. The surrounding terrain of the water can also present their own dangers. Rapids can eject a rider from their tube causing them to land to rocks or other terrain. Non-towed tubing is often an all-day activity, so there is also a risk that a participant develops a sunburn. Furthermore, people often engage in excessive drinking, leading to a state of drunkenness that can pose a danger to other tubers and even to themselves, as alcohol poisoning is common at some popular tubing locations.

=== Snow ===
Snow tubing incidents are also becoming increasingly common. The common cause of the incidents is blunt force trauma as a result of the rider colliding into a fixed object at high speeds. This frequently results in head and neck injuries. Due to the location of these injuries, death is not uncommon as was seen in 2015 when a snow-tube rider fatally collided with a light pole.

== Terminology ==
=== Water ===
- Beer Raft – Is a raft or a specially designed inflatable cooler the purpose of which is to hold ice, drinks, food and most importantly adult beverages. Also commonly called "Beertanic"
- Kubing – The act of tubing down a river alongside a beer keg located inside of another inner tube.
- Biscuit – A nickname used to describe the shape of a tube that resembles a disc.
- Donut – A nickname used to describe the shape of a tube with a hole in the middle.
- Drop In Point – Is the location at which a float begins and tubers transition from land into water.
- Float – Is an event in which a group gathers for the sole purpose of making their way down a river on tubes for enjoyment.
- Flotilla – Refers to a group of two or more tubes floating down a river while sharing supplies and company. Often the tubes will be joined with rope.
- Exit Point – Is the location at the end of the float where tubers exit the river.
- Island – Is larger than a tube, but is not a raft. An island can fit four or more people, but still maintains a circular shape and has poor maneuverability.
- Point of Interest – A location that is interesting or useful. It can be a place to rendezvous on the river, a naturally occurring attraction, or a dangerous point that one should be aware of.
- Portage – Is a point along the float in which tubers have to exit with their tubes and walk because of low water or dangerous water obstacles.
- Pump – Is either a manual or an electric device used to inflate a tube or raft.
- Raft – Is a boat shaped inflatable that can hold 1 or more tubers plus supplies. Rafts often come with oars, but the oars are not necessary for tubing.
- Tube – Is the vehicle used to stay afloat while tubing, often inflatable.
- Tubers – People who takes part in tubing.
- Tubing – The act of floating down a river for fun.
- Water shoes – Shoes used to protect the feet when walking in water and over rocks. Often Tevas, Keens or Crocs are used.

== See also ==
- Toobin' – an arcade version and video game of the sport
- Zorbing
