= Satan's Hollow =

1982 video game

- Arcade flyer
- Publishers: Bally Midway; Commodore
- Designer: Bill Adams
- Platforms: Arcade, Commodore 64
- Release: Arcade: NA: October 1982; EU: Early 1983; Commodore 64; 1984
- Genre: Fixed shooter
- Modes: Single-player, multiplayer
- Arcade system: Midway MCR-II

Satan's Hollow is a fixed shooter released as an arcade video game by Bally Midway in 1982. It uses the same flight-controller style joystick with built-in trigger as Midway's Tron, released the same year. The player shoots attacking demons while attempting to build a bridge to the next screen to fight a fire-breathing devil head. A Commodore 64 port was published in 1984.

== Gameplay ==
The player must shoot flying formations of gargoyles in order to pick up pieces of a bridge that must be built over a river of lava. Once the bridge is completed, the player can cross it to face Satan. Destroying him scores bonus points based on the number of waves completed to that point, and also upgrades the rocket launcher. The player then resumes the battle against the gargoyles and must start building a new, longer bridge in order to fight Satan again. The sky darkens on later waves, making it more difficult to see the enemies, then lightens again.

As the game progresses, the gargoyles begin to throw exploding eggs, along with rocks that can destroy bridge sections; the player also occasionally faces disembodied devil heads that float around the screen and spit fire. In addition to firing rockets at the enemies, the player can use a shield that will destroy any enemy touching it, but it can only be used for a short time before it must shut down to recharge. Gargoyles will sometimes attempt to steal a ship from the player's reserves, and must be destroyed before reaching the top of the screen in order to avoid losing a life.

== Reception ==
French magazine Tilt rated the arcade game four out of six stars in 1983.

== Legacy ==
Atari 8-bit computers and Atari 5200 versions were completed and advertised by CBS software, but never released.

The game is included in the Midway Arcade Treasures collection, released in 2003 for PlayStation 2, GameCube and Xbox, and in 2004 for Windows. It was also included in the Midway Arcade Origins collection, released in 2012 for PlayStation 3 and Xbox 360.
