= Major Motion =

1986 video game

- Developers: Philip McKenzie; Jeffrey Sorenson
- Publisher: MichTron
- Platforms: Atari ST, Amiga
- Release: 1986: Atari ST; 1988: Amiga
- Genre: Vehicular combat

Major Motion is a vehicular combat game written for the Atari ST by Philip McKenzie and Jeffrey Sorenson and published by MichTron in 1986. An Amiga version followed in 1988. Major Motion is a clone of the Spy Hunter arcade video game.

== Gameplay ==
Major Motion is a game in which racers can kill their enemies, and shoot and sideswipe the other cars.

== Reception ==
Gregg Williams reviewed the game for Computer Gaming World, and stated that "Overall, the game is laudable."
