= Rampart (video game) =

1990 video game

- North American arcade flyer
- Developer: Atari Games
- Publishers: NA/EU: Atari Games; JP: Namco
- Designers: John Salwitz; Dave Ralston
- Programmer: John Salwitz
- Artist: Dave Ralston
- Composers: Don Diekneite; Brad Fuller
- Platform: Arcade: NES, Genesis/Mega Drive, Atari Lynx, Super NES, Game Boy, Master System, Amiga, Amstrad CPC, Atari ST, Commodore 64, MS-DOS, Mac OS, Game Boy Color
- Release: October 1990: Arcade; NA: October 1990; JP: April 1991 NES; JP: November 29, 1991; NA: January 1992 Lynx; NA: May 1992 Super NES; NA: August 1992 Game Boy; JP: October 30, 1992; NA: 1993; EU: 1993 Master System; EU: December 3, 1992 Genesis/Mega Drive; JP: December 11, 1992; NA: 1992 Amiga, Atari ST, C64, CPC; EU: 1992 MS-DOS; UK: 1992; NA: 1992 Game Boy Color; NA: November 18, 1999
- Genre: Strategy
- Modes: Single-player, multiplayer

Rampart is a 1990 strategy video game developed and published by Atari Games for North American and European arcades, with distribution in Japan handled by Namco. Presented from a top-down perspective, the game tasks the player with defending their territory from enemy invaders. The gameplay alternates between a building phase, where the player constructs walls around vulnerable castles, and a combat phase, in which cannons are used in an attempt to drive back hostile forces. A trackball is used to control the game.

It had a limited US release in October 1990, followed by a wide release in February 1991. Rampart is a precursor to the tower defense genre, popularized in the 2000s.

== Gameplay ==
The battle phase in single-player mode

Rampart is a strategy video game with some elements from the action genre. The player controls and defends a territory consisting of a wall surrounding a set of castles and cannons. Gameplay alternates between two time-limited phases: combat and building. In the building phase, the player attempts to expand their territory and repair any damage from combat. In the combat phase, the player attacks the enemy with their cannons. In single-player games, the player fights against a fleet of ships; in multi-player games, the players fight each other with rivers separating the sides.

The game opens with an automated building phase in which the computer builds a wall around one castle. The ownership of a castle grants the player control over a number of cannons and, after building the wall, the game enters a phase in which the user places the cannons within their territory.

When the building phase ends, combat begins. In single-player mode, a number of ships approach the player's territory and fires cannons at their walls. The player responds by firing their cannons at the moving ships; the relatively slow speed of the cannonballs requires the player to "lead" their targets. In multi-player mode, the players shoot at each other's walls. The goal of the attacker in both cases is to make holes in the walls. Combat ends when the user sinks a certain number of ships or, in two-player mode, after a set time.

When combat ends, the player loses control of any area which is no longer fully surrounded by their wall along with all cannons in that area. A user-controlled building phase then begins. Shapes like those from Tetris appear and the player moves and rotates them with the goal of placing them so that they close gaps in the existing wall or extend the wall around additional castles.

When the tile-placement phase ends, any castle or cannon that is completely enclosed by a continual wall is added to the player's territory. Afterwards, the cycle repeats with cannon placement again. Each surrounded castle awards the player with one cannon during each arming phase (the home castle grants two, but only if there is space).

Since the damage caused during the combat phase is normally spread out, repairing it can be difficult. The blocks are generally larger than the gaps (although one-unit blocks do appear sometimes) and filling the gaps often requires a large block to fill a small gap. The leftover extra bits of the block obstructs the placement of future blocks, making it increasingly difficult to fix the damage as the larger blocks may not fit into the block-free area.

The player loses when they fail to have at least one surrounded castle after the tile-placement phase. In single-player games, there is a fixed set of six levels; in two player modes, if both players survive, the one with the higher score is declared the winner. If the player defeats the opponent, they can execute the commander by walking the plank or beheading. Cannons can also be destroyed and bonus squares give extra points when captured and when there are no grunts or craters.

== Ports ==
Rampart has been ported to the Super NES, Master System, Mega Drive/Genesis, Atari Lynx, MS-DOS, Macintosh, Commodore 64, Amiga, and Atari ST. Separate versions were made for Game Boy, Game Boy Color, and NES. The NES, Super NES, and MS-DOS versions were all done by Bitmasters, and the NES version was planned for publication by Tengen (without a Nintendo license), but was switched to Jaleco (which was granted a Nintendo license), and the Super NES and MS-DOS versions were published by Electronic Arts. Most of the home versions have updated features. The Japanese Famicom version, which was released by Konami, includes seven training levels, three difficulty settings, and an extensive two-player mode. The Famicom port was given an unofficial English translation in May 2017.

In the Super NES and MS-DOS versions, the cannons gained can also be converted into powerups.

The arcade version is part of the Midway Arcade Treasures compilation for the GameCube, PlayStation 2, Xbox, and PlayStation Portable, and of the Midway Arcade Origins compilation for the PlayStation 3 and Xbox 360. It is bundled in a dual pack with Gauntlet for the Game Boy Advance. A PlayStation 3 version with Internet multiplayer mode was released on the PlayStation Network on May 10, 2007.

== Reception ==
Reception

Review score
Publication	Score
Electronic Gaming Monthly	4/10, 6/10, 8/10, 4/10 (NES)

In Japan, Game Machine listed Rampart as the seventh most successful table arcade unit of May 1991.

Julian Rignall of Computer and Video Games reviewed the arcade game, giving it a 93% score.

MegaTech gave the Mega Drive version 90% and a Hyper Game Award, saying that it was a "superb blend of different game styles". Console XS reviewed the Master System version, giving it an 81% score. Nintendo Power placed it the fourth best Game Boy Game of 1993.

== Legacy ==
Rampart influenced the first tower defense games around a decade later. Gameplay similarities include defending a territory by constructing defensive structures, and making repairs between multiple rounds of attacks.
