= Spy Hunter II =

1987 video game

- Sales flyer picturing the arcade cabinet and the split screen at the bottom.
- Developer: Bally Midway
- Publisher: Bally Midway
- Series: Spy Hunter
- Platform: Arcade
- Release: 1987
- Genre: Vehicular combat
- Modes: Single-player, multiplayer

Spy Hunter II is a 1987 vehicular combat arcade game developed and published by Bally Midway. It is the sequel to 1983's Spy Hunter. Unlike its predecessor, Spy Hunter II was not ported to any contemporary systems and remained obscure. George Gomez, who designed the original, was critical of the sequel as it was made by Bally Midway without his involvement.

== Gameplay ==
The gameplay is similar to the original Spy Hunter but takes place in a 3D overhead behind the car view. The player can obtain several weapons just like in the original Spy hunter such as oil slicks, missiles and smoke screen. The game also includes a two player co-operative mode where the players can help each other out. The arcade cabinet uses a single monitor divided by a bezel and two steering wheels. Both the cabinet and in-game design were previously seen in Bally Midway's Max RPM, released the year before.

== Legacy ==
Spy Hunter II was included on the collection Midway Arcade Treasures 2. The game was also included in the 2012 compilation Midway Arcade Origins for PlayStation 3 and Xbox 360.
