= RoadBlasters =

1987 video game

- Arcade flyer
- Developer: Atari Games
- Publisher: Atari Games: Amiga, ST, C64, CPC, Spectrum U.S. Gold Genesis/Mega Drive, NES Tengen Lynx Atari Corporation
- Designer: Robert Weatherby
- Programmer: Robert Weatherby
- Artists: Mark Stephen Pierce; Kris Moser
- Composer: Brad Fuller
- Platforms: Arcade, Amiga, Commodore 64, Amstrad CPC, ZX Spectrum, Atari ST, NES, Lynx, Genesis/Mega Drive
- Release: March 1987: Arcade; NA: March 1987; WW: 1987 Amiga; UK: 1988 C64, CPC, Spectrum; EU: 1988 Atari ST; UK: 1989 NES; NA: January 1990; EU: 1990 Lynx; NA: 1990; JP: January 5, 1991 Genesis/Mega Drive; NA: November 1991; JP: February 28, 1992
- Genre: Vehicular combat
- Mode: Single-player
- Arcade system: Atari System 1

RoadBlasters is a 1987 vehicular combat video game developed and published by Atari Games for arcades. The player navigates an armed sports car through 50 different rally races, getting to the finish line before running out of fuel. Ports were released for a variety of home systems by Tengen and U.S. Gold.

== Gameplay ==
Arcade version screenshot

The objective is to complete all 50 rallies without running out of fuel. The player's car is equipped with a cannon that can be used to destroy enemy vehicles and roadside gun turrets for extra points. A scoring multiplier is set to 1 at the start of each rally. Each time the player successfully strikes a target, the multiplier increases by one, up to a maximum multiplier of 10. After missing a target, the multiplier drops by 1.

A helicopter occasionally flies overhead and drops a power-up item, which the player can pick up; these items have a limited number of uses. The player also encounters indestructible obstacles consisting of mines, boulders, floating "spiker" balls, and oil slicks, the last of which will cause the player to lose control for a moment if hit.

The player's car has two fuel tanks, a main tank and a smaller reserve. If the main tank runs empty at any time, the car begins to use its reserve. Red (dropped by enemies destroyed from a distance) and green (appearing at specific milestones) globes on the road add small amounts of fuel to the main tank when picked up. Reaching the halfway point of a rally resets the main tank to the level it had at the start of that stage, but does not affect the reserve. At the end of each rally, the main tank is refilled and fuel is added to the reserve based on the number of points scored in that stage.

Contact with any enemy, projectile, or obstacle other than an oil slick destroys the player's car, removes any power-up in effect, and resets the scoring multiplier to 1. The player loses a small amount of fuel while a replacement car is put on the road. There is no limit to the number of times that the player's car can be destroyed and replaced; the game only ends when both the main and reserve fuel tanks are exhausted.

The player may continue as many times as desired during the first 49 rallies, but is given only one chance to play the 50th and final one. Completing this rally awards a bonus of one million points and ends the game.

== Promotions ==
A promotional giveaway was accessible on the original arcade version, where players could send in their name and "personalized secret code" after completing rally 50 and receive a free RoadBlasters T-shirt. The promotion ended on August 31st 1987.

The game had a toy tie-in made by Matchbox. The toys were die-cast cars that could be customized with armor, lasers, machine guns, and rocket launchers and jet engines. There were two factions: Turbo Force and The Motor Lords. There also were play sets such as a mobile command base.

== Reception ==
Reception

Review scores
Publication	Score
Crash	84%
Computer and Video Games	5/10
Electronic Gaming Monthly	8/10, 7/10, 7/10, 7/10 (Lynx) 8/10, 8/10, 7/10, 8/10 (GEN)
Famitsu	4/10, 6/10, 7/10, 7/10
GamePro	20/25 (Lynx)
IGN	9/10 (Lynx)
Sinclair User	81%
Your Sinclair	8/10
MegaTech	72%
ACE	654
The Games Machine	62%
Zzap!64	75%
Power Play (DE)	75%
ST/Amiga Format	58%
Amiga Action	45%
Raze	80% (NES); 84% (Lynx)

In a capsule review of the Atari Lynx version for STart, Clayton Walnum praised the game's massive length and combination of "standard racing with heaps of action." He added that "If you liked Roadblasters on another system, you won't be disappointed in the Lynx version." CVG Magazine also reviewed the Atari Lynx version of the game, Julian Rignall went on to say "Roadblasters is a challenging game and is technically superb, with stunning graphics and great speech." He said it was fun but the levels were frustrating finally giving it a rating of 76 out of 100.

In a review of the Lynx version, Robert A. Jung concluded, "This is a mind-blowing awesome adaptation. I'd recommend it to most video-game players—fans of driving games, fans of shooting games, fans of action games, and fans of the arcade original. It's a challenging, well-balanced arcade/action game, faithful to the original, worthy of the Lynx and offering lots of hours of fun. This goes right up there with Blue Lightning as one of the best Lynx games around." He gave a score of 9 out of 10.

== Legacy ==
The game appeared on the PlayStation compilation Arcade's Greatest Hits: The Atari Collection 2 in 1998. It was also released for the PlayStation 2, Xbox, GameCube and Windows as part of the 2003 Midway Arcade Treasures arcade game compilation.

A port can be played in Lego Dimensions via an Arcade Dock in the level "The Phantom Zone."

The game is featured in the Disney film Wreck-It Ralph, where it was associated with the backstory of Turbo/King Candy, the film's main antagonist.
