= Timber (video game) =

1984 video game

- Developer: Marvin Glass and Associates
- Publisher: Bally Midway
- Designer: Steve Meyer
- Artist: R. Scott Morrison
- Composer: R. Scott Morrison
- Platform: Arcade
- Release: October 1984
- Genre: Action
- Modes: Single-player, multiplayer
- Arcade system: Bally Midway MCR II

Timber is an arcade game manufactured by Bally Midway in 1984. The goal is to amass points by chopping down trees, then logrolling in bonus rounds. Two players can compete simultaneously in the same play area. Timber was designed by Steve Meyer, who also designed Tapper, and both games have a similar audio/visual style.

== Gameplay ==
The player assumes the role of a lumberjack in the game and must chop down a given number of trees that sequentially pop up from the ground in a limited amount of time to complete each level. The game is controlled using two joysticks, with one controlling the player's movement and the other corresponding to left or right chops with the player's axe. As the game progresses, the quota gradually increases and the time decreases. While playing, the player must avoid beehives that are thrown by bears or lose a life. The player can earn bonus points by hitting a beehive with the axe, or by catching birds that occasionally fly out of felled trees.

Every couple of levels, the player is given the opportunity to amass bonus points. These stages begin with the player standing on a floating log. As the log begins to rotate, players must make use of their reflexes to stay on top of the log. The first two times this is played, the log is relatively large; on future attempts, the size of the log shrinks considerably. This minigame ends if the player falls off the log or balances atop it for a certain amount of time, earning a bonus in the latter case.

The game also features two-player simultaneous multiplayer, and can be played competitively or cooperatively. In this mode, either player can earn bonus points by pushing a tree onto the other; in addition, a bonus is awarded to the player who cuts down more trees in each level.

== Release ==
The cabinet of all the Timber arcade games were originally either a Tapper or a Root Beer Tapper cabinet, both also made by Bally Midway.

Timber is included in 2004's Midway Arcade Treasures 2, a compilation disc of Midway Games titles for the Xbox, PlayStation 2, and GameCube. It is also part of Lego Dimensions (2016), accessed by using the Arcade Dock in the level "Once Upon A Time Machine In The West".

== Competitive play ==
The current world record holder for highest score is Joshua Lombay with a score of 9,767,550. He beat previous record holder Don Duwelius who had recorded a high score of 6,013,515 in 2011.
