= Total Carnage =

1992 video game

- Arcade flyer
- Developer: Midway
- Publisher: Midway
- Designers: Eugene Jarvis; Mark Turmell
- Programmers: Mark Turmell; Shawn Liptak
- Artists: Jim Gentile; John Tobias; Tony Goskie
- Composer: Jonathan Hey
- Platforms: Arcade, Amiga, CD32, Jaguar, Game Boy, MS-DOS, Super NES
- Release: March 1992: Arcade; NA: March 1992 Super NES; NA: November 1993; EU: 1993 Game Boy; NA: February 1994; EU: February 17, 1994 Amiga; EU: May 1994 CD32; EU: May 1994 MS-DOS; NA: 1994; EU: 1994 Jaguar; WW: September 22, 2005
- Genre: Twin-stick shooter
- Modes: Single-player, multiplayer
- Arcade system: Midway Y Unit

Total Carnage is a twin-stick shooter arcade video game originally developed and published by Midway in North America in March 1992. Set in the fictional country of Kookistan during 1999, players assume the role of Captain Carnage and Major Mayhem from the Doomsday Squad in a last-ditch effort to overthrow dictator General Akhboob and his army of mutants from conquering the world, while also rescuing POWs held by his military force.

Total Carnage was created by most of the same team who previously worked on Williams' 1990 arcade game Smash TV and shares many gameplay elements. Both use twin-stick shooter control schemes, but while Smash TV takes place in single-screen arenas, Total Carnage has large scrolling levels and bonus levels. Total Carnage adds bombs which can be collected and become active when dropped, exploding several seconds later.

The game was ported to the Amiga, CD32, Jaguar, Game Boy, MS-DOS, and Super Nintendo Entertainment System. It is included in multiple compilations, such as Midway Arcade Treasures 2, Midway Arcade Treasures Deluxe Edition and Midway Arcade Origins.

The arcade version of Total Carnage received positive reception from critics, but it was not successful financially. The ports were met with mixed critical response. Designer Mark Turmell would go to work on the highly successful NBA Jam.

== Gameplay ==
Arcade version screenshot showing Captain Carnage fighting against the first boss, Orcus.

Total Carnage is a multidirectional shooter similar to Smash TV where players assume the role of Captain Carnage (P1) and Major Mayhem (P2) from the Doomsday Squad across three stages, each with a boss at the end that must be fought before progressing any further, in a last-ditch effort to overthrow dictator General Akhboob (loosely based on Saddam Hussein) and his army of mutants from conquering the world by invading Akhboob's "Baby Milk Factory" base, while also rescuing POWs held by his military force as the main objective. The players' characters are patterned after John Rambo while the setting is influenced by the 1991 Persian Gulf War (including the Abu Ghraib Infant Formula Plant).

Players move their respective characters with the left joystick, while the right joystick shoots bullets towards enemies. Players can also enter a password at the start to warp their player character to any location of the game. Getting hit by enemy fire or colliding with dangerous stage obstacles will result in losing a life and once all lives are lost, the game is over unless the players insert more credits into the arcade machine to continue playing.

The game shares many elements with Williams' previous title, while also adding new ones including scrolling stages, large enemy vehicles, the ability to collect and place bombs, and a much wider range of gameplay scenarios.

== Development ==
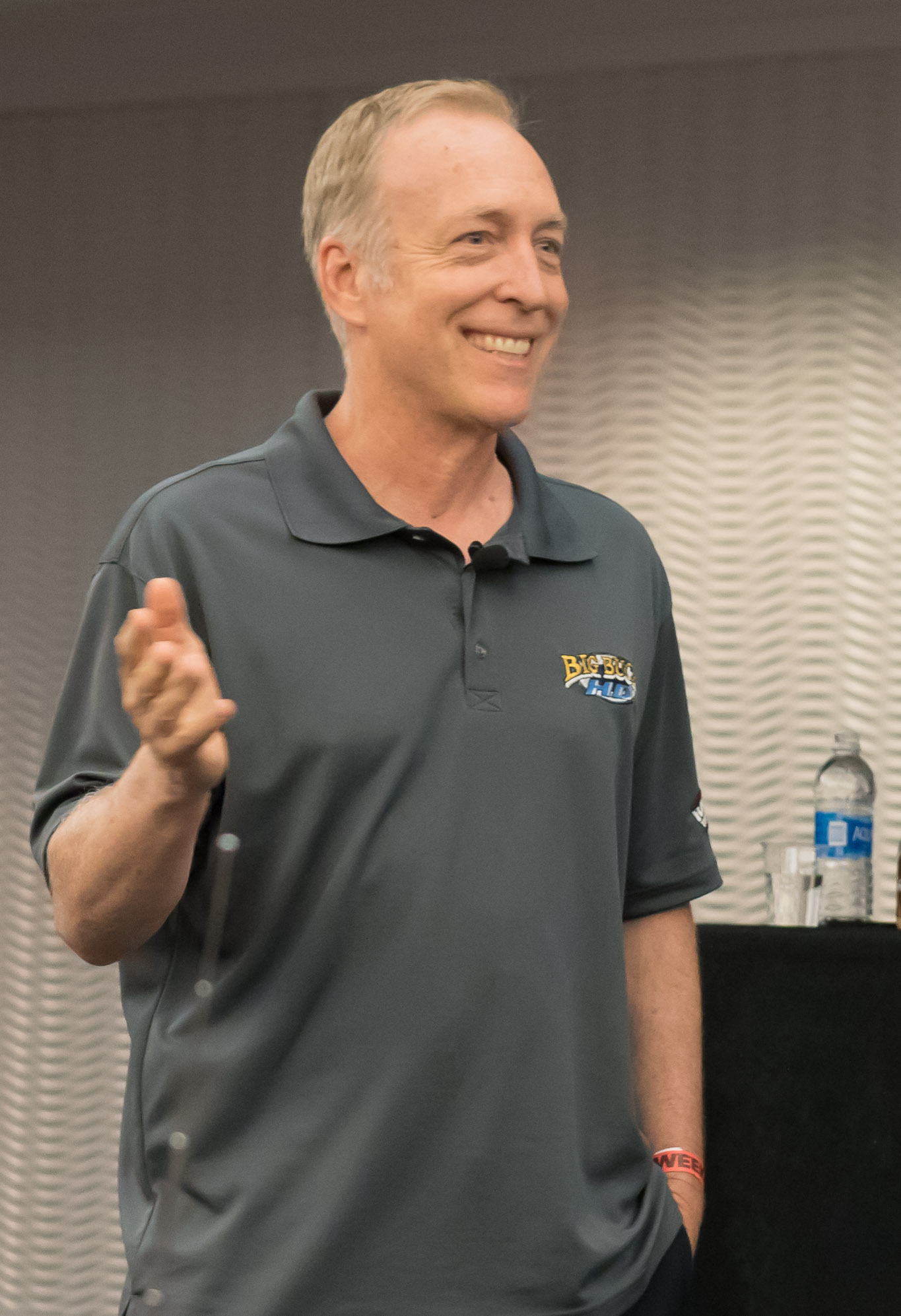
Total Carnage was designed by most of the same team who previously worked on Smash TV for Williams including Robotron: 2084 co-creator Eugene Jarvis.

Total Carnage was created by most of the same team behind Williams' Smash TV, some of which would also later go on to work at other Midway franchises such as Mortal Kombat and NBA Jam. Mark Turmell served as lead developer and programmer of the project alongside Shawn Liptak and Robotron: 2084 co-creator Eugene Jarvis. Artists Jim Gentile, John Tobias and Tony Goskie were responsible for the pixel art, while Jonathan Hey was in charge of its sound design. Mortal Kombat co-creator Ed Boon was the voice of General Akhboob.

The game was originally programmed to display one of two endings upon completion of the Pleasure Dome bonus stage. One ending would feature the women and playable characters from Smash TV and was to be displayed if the player collected all the treasures in the dome. A second "bad" ending showed the same screen without the women along with a message challenging the player to collect all the dome's treasure. However, a bug in the game caused the "good" ending to be displayed with the "bad" ending text no matter how many treasures were collected. The bug was found during the testing for 2012's Midway Arcade Origins compilation. In response, Turmell stated that he remembers writing working code for both endings, but was not sure why the code was changed. He suggested that he might have kept the bug as a joke and went unfixed in Origins.

== Ports ==
The Amiga and CD32 versions were created by UK-based developer International Computer Entertainment, with Keith Weatherly and Simon Fox acting as programmers of the conversion, while Ellen Hopkins and Mike Jary were responsible for adapting the artwork as well. Both Weatherly and Fox recounted the development process and history of the Amiga version between 1993 and 1994 through publications such as The One for Amiga Games and Amiga Format. Weatherly and Fox stated that the conversion took over a year to develop with Midway supervising its production and the team initially had plans to integrate elements which were scrapped from the original arcade release, but were ultimately discarded in the end. Midway provided both artwork and source code of the arcade original to the team at ICE, although adapting the former into the Amiga proved to be difficult, as both Weatherly and Fox stated that the number of colors and animations were reduced to fit the hardware.

=== Cancelled ports ===
Versions for both the Sega CD and Genesis were in development by Black Pearl Software and planned to be published by Malibu Games but neither port were officially released to the public for unknown reasons, despite being advertised and previewed in a few video game magazines. A prototype cartridge of the Genesis port is currently under ownership of video game collector Jason Wilson.

== Release ==
Total Carnage was first released in arcades by Midway in January 1992. In late 1993, The game was ported to the Super Nintendo Entertainment System by Solid Software and published by THQ division Malibu Games. This version mimics the dual control aspect of the arcade original by mapping the console's four main buttons (A, B, X and Y) like a D-pad, enabling the player to shoot in one direction while running in another. In February 1994, a Game Boy port of the title was released by Malibu Games across North America and Europe. In mid-1994, it was also ported to the Amiga and Amiga CD32 by International Computer Entertainment. Around the same time period, a MS-DOS conversion by British developer Hand Made Software was released as well. The original arcade game was first re-released in 2004 as part of Midway Arcade Treasures 2 for the PlayStation 2, Xbox, and GameCube. In 2005, an Atari Jaguar version by Hand Made Software that previously went unpublished was released worldwide by Songbird Productions, nearly ten years after work on the game originally began. The arcade version was later re-released in 2006 as part of Midway Arcade Treasures Deluxe Edition for the PC and in 2012 as part of Midway Arcade Origins for PlayStation 3 and Xbox 360.

== Reception ==
Reception

Review scores
Publication	Score					
Publication	Amiga	Arcade	Atari Jaguar	CD32	Game Boy	SNES
AllGame	N/A	N/A	N/A	N/A	N/A	4/5
Aktueller Software Markt	2/12	N/A	N/A	7/12	2/12	N/A
Amiga Computing	50%	N/A	N/A	N/A	N/A	N/A
Amiga Format	43%	N/A	N/A	N/A	N/A	N/A
Amiga Power	10%	N/A	N/A	N/A	N/A	N/A
Amiga User International	88%	N/A	N/A	N/A	N/A	N/A
GamePro	N/A	N/A	N/A	N/A	N/A	3.75/5 (Note: GamePro scored the SNES version two 4/5 score for graphics and fun factor, and two 3.5/5 ratings for sound and fun factor.)
GamesMaster	N/A	N/A	N/A	N/A	N/A	90/100
Joypad	N/A	N/A	N/A	N/A	N/A	69%
Nintendo Power	N/A	N/A	N/A	N/A	2.725/5 (Note: Nintendo Power scored the Game Boy version 2.8/5 three times for play control, challenge, and theme/fun, and 2.5/5 for graphics/sound.)	3.05/5 (Note: Nintendo Power scored the SNES version 3/5 twice for graphics/sound and play control, 3.3/5 for challenge, and 2.9/5 for theme/fun.)
Player One	N/A	N/A	N/A	N/A	N/A	75%
Sinclair User	N/A	96%	N/A	N/A	N/A	N/A
Video Games (DE)	N/A	N/A	N/A	N/A	N/A	64%
Amiga Games	38%	N/A	N/A	38%	N/A	N/A
Amiga Joker	61%	N/A	N/A	54%	N/A	N/A
The One for Amiga Games	42% 44%	N/A	N/A	N/A	N/A	N/A
Play Meter	N/A	9/10	N/A	N/A	N/A	N/A
Play Time	32%	N/A	N/A	32%	N/A	N/A
Power Unlimited	N/A	N/A	N/A	N/A	N/A	80/100
ReVival	N/A	N/A	8/10	N/A	N/A	N/A

RePlay reported Total Carnage to be the third most-popular arcade game in the United States in May 1992. According to Liptak, Total Carnage failed to reach the target of 2,000 arcade cabinets ordered. The game's slow sales resulted in Turmell taking on a different project for his next game, which would become the highly successful NBA Jam.

In a coin-op feature, Sinclair User rated the arcade game 96% and called it a "classic cartoon style cathartic experience", dubbing it the "best game of 1992". In 2009, the game's trademark was abandoned.
