= 720° =

1986 video game

- Arcade flyer
- Developer: Atari Games (Note: Home computer versions developed by Tiertex Design Studios; NES version developed by Beam Software; Game Boy Color version developed by Game Brains.)
- Publishers: Atari Games: CPC, ZX Spectrum U.S. Gold C64; EU: U.S. Gold; NA: Mindscape NES Mindscape Game Boy Color Midway
- Designers: John Salwitz; Dave Ralston
- Programmer: John Salwitz
- Artist: Dave Ralston
- Composers: Hal Canon; Earl Vickers; Brad Fuller
- Platforms: Arcade, Amstrad CPC, ZX Spectrum, Commodore 64, NES, Game Boy Color
- Release: December 1986: Arcade; NA: December 1986 CPC, ZX Spectrum; EU: November 1987 C64; EU: November 1987; NA: January 1989 NES; NA: December 1989 Game Boy Color; NA: March 4, 1999
- Genre: Sports (skateboarding)
- Modes: Single-player, multiplayer
- Arcade system: Atari System 2

720° is a 1986 sports video game developed and published by Atari Games for arcades. Based on the sport of skateboarding, the player controls a skateboarder as they compete in various skating competitions, such as ramp jumping and downhill races, to earn cash.

The game has been ported and re-released to various home console and computer platforms.

== Gameplay ==
The game begins with the player controlling a skateboarder skating around a middle-class neighborhood using common objects as ramps for jumps.

The player begins with a number of "tickets", each of which grants admission to one of four skate parks, or "events" in Skate City, the "hub" between the parks. When a park is entered, one ticket is expended. The player gains additional tickets by earning points. Whenever the player isn't in an event, a bar counts down the time remaining until the arrival of a swarm of killer bees accompanied by the caption of "SKATE OR DIE!". Once the bees arrive, the player still has a small amount of time to make it to a park. The longer the player delays this, the faster the bees become until they are unavoidable. Getting caught by the bees ends the game, but on default settings, the player may elect to continue by inserting more money. Reaching a park with a ticket gives the player the chance to earn points, medals and money. The money is used to upgrade equipment and the timer will reset upon completion of an event.

The player constantly races to perform stunts, both in the events and in the park itself, to earn the points needed to acquire tickets. Thus, the player's score is directly tied to the amount of time available to play the game. In order to win, the player must complete a total of sixteen events through four hubs.

The "Skate or Die" message appearing, as the player is running out of time

The game has four levels, each consisting of four events:

- Ramp: the player skates around a half-pipe structure, trying to gain more and more height and performing tricks in the air to earn the most possible points. This ends when the timer runs out.
- Downhill: a long course consisting of slopes and banks must be navigated to reach the finish line. The quicker the player reaches the finish, the more points are earned.
- Slalom: an obstacle course in which the player is required to pass between pairs of yellow flags scattered across the course. Each gate passed grants a little extra time, and scoring depends on time remaining upon crossing the finish line.
- Jump: the player jumps from a series of ramps, attempting to hit a bull's-eye target off the screen. There are cryptic marks on the ramp before the jump that provide clues as to the location of the target. This ends when the timer runs out or the player crosses the finish line, whichever comes first.

Scattered in the levels are several "map" icons placed on the ground which when activated show a map with the roads, parks, shops, and the player's location marked on it. Also scattered about the level are hazards and obstacles; jumping over hazards earns points.

The player earns points and money for high scores in each event, and doing well at the events earns the cash needed to buy equipment that improves player performance, and a chance at a bronze, silver, or gold medal. Completing all four events in all four classes finishes the game.

== Development ==
The game program for the arcade version was written in BLISS, and utilized the Atari System 2 hardware.

== Ports ==
The game was released to the Commodore 64 (twice) in 1987, the Amstrad CPC and ZX Spectrum in 1988, the Nintendo Entertainment System (NES) in 1989, and the Game Boy Color in 1999. There is also an unreleased port for the Atari Lynx.

The Amstrad CPC, ZX Spectrum, and the first Commodore 64 versions were developed by Tiertex Design Studios and published by U.S. Gold. Sinclair User described it as "US Gold's finest hour".

The Game Boy Color version was developed by Game Brains and published by Midway Games. It was originally released in March 1999 in North America and Europe.

== Reception ==
Reception

Review scores
Publication	Score
Crash	81%
Computer and Video Games	28/40
Game Informer	9.75/10
Sinclair User	10/10
Your Sinclair	9/10
The Games Machine	83%
MicroHobby (ES)	5/5
ACE	721

Awards
Publication	Award
Sinclair User	SU Classic
Your Sinclair	Megagame

The game received an overall positive reception among both users and critics. In 1995, Flux magazine ranked the game 79th on their "Top 100 Video Games", writing that it was "addicting" and completely unique for its time.

== Legacy ==
Emulated versions of the game are included in Midway Arcade Treasures, released in 2003 and 2004, and Midway Arcade Origins, released in 2012.
