= Vindicators (video game) =

1988 video game

- NES box art by Marc Ericksen
- Developer: Atari Games (Note: NES version developed by Westwood Associates.)
- Publishers: Atari Games; Ports; Tengen
- Designers: Kelly Turner; Norm Avellar
- Composer: Brad Fuller; Hal Canon: NES Paul S. Mudra Dwight Okahara
- Platforms: Arcade, Commodore 64, ZX Spectrum, NES, Amiga, Atari ST, Amstrad CPC
- Release: April 1988: Arcade; NA: April 1988 C64; UK: 1988 ZX Spectrum; UK: March 1989 NES; NA: November 1989 Amiga, Atari ST; NA: December 1989; UK: 1989 CPC; UK: 1989
- Genre: Multidirectional shooter
- Modes: Single-player, multiplayer

Vindicators is a 1988 multidirectional shooter video game developed and published by Atari Games for arcades. One or two players each control a tank in a multidirectional scrolling level. The game received ports by Tengen to home computers and the Nintendo Entertainment System (the latter version of which was not licensed by Nintendo and used an alternate chip to defeat the 10NES lockout system). Ports were planned for the Atari Lynx and Apple IIGS (with the latter even completed), but were both cancelled. Vindicators was followed by the lesser-known arcade sequel Vindicators Part II.

== Gameplay ==
Arcade screenshot

The game begins by asking the player(s) to choose a difficulty level. The higher difficulties make the enemies stronger and the players weaker and also start the players in a later set of levels (called "galaxies") and with some powerups. The easiest difficulty starts the player(s) in the first level with no bonuses. The player controls a tank with constantly draining fuel, and must navigate through multiple levels (14 stations in the arcade version) from bottom to top, encountering obstacles and enemies. Along the way, the player may find powerups including tank fuel, stars (currency), shields, and two types of sub-weapons: smart shots (homing missiles) and bombs (powerful rockets). Each level has a key that will open a door at the top of the level, which will either take the player to the next level or to a special hub with multiple powerups that must be escaped in 10 seconds or less (15 for the NES version, though the timer stays stuck at 10 for five seconds before counting). If the player is unable to escape, the tank will lose half its fuel. After escaping the hub, the player(s) then proceeds to the next station.

Occasionally, the player(s) will face a boss that must be beaten to advance. Normal shots are ineffective however, and the player must decide/guess the appropriate time to buy sub-weapons to greatly raise the chance of victory. After destroying a boss, the player(s) can continue to the end of the level.

Between levels, the player is taken to a shop where items and upgrades to tank speed, power, etc. may be purchased with stars. Any damage caused to the player's tank will decrease the shield level. Buying a shield drastically reduces damage down to a mere pixel worth of the fuel gauge per hit. When the fuel depletes, the speed of the tank is reduced to a crawl and a countdown begins from 10. If no fuel is gained before the timer reaches zero, or if the player is shot during the countdown, the tank explodes and a life is lost.

The arcade version, in addition to having special two-joystick controls for each player, contained three special contest levels, with one contest star in each. With three contest stars and nine normal stars, the player(s) could compete in a special time-limited contest level in which the player could win a T-shirt. A later version of the game was released which eliminated the contest levels and stars.

== Development ==
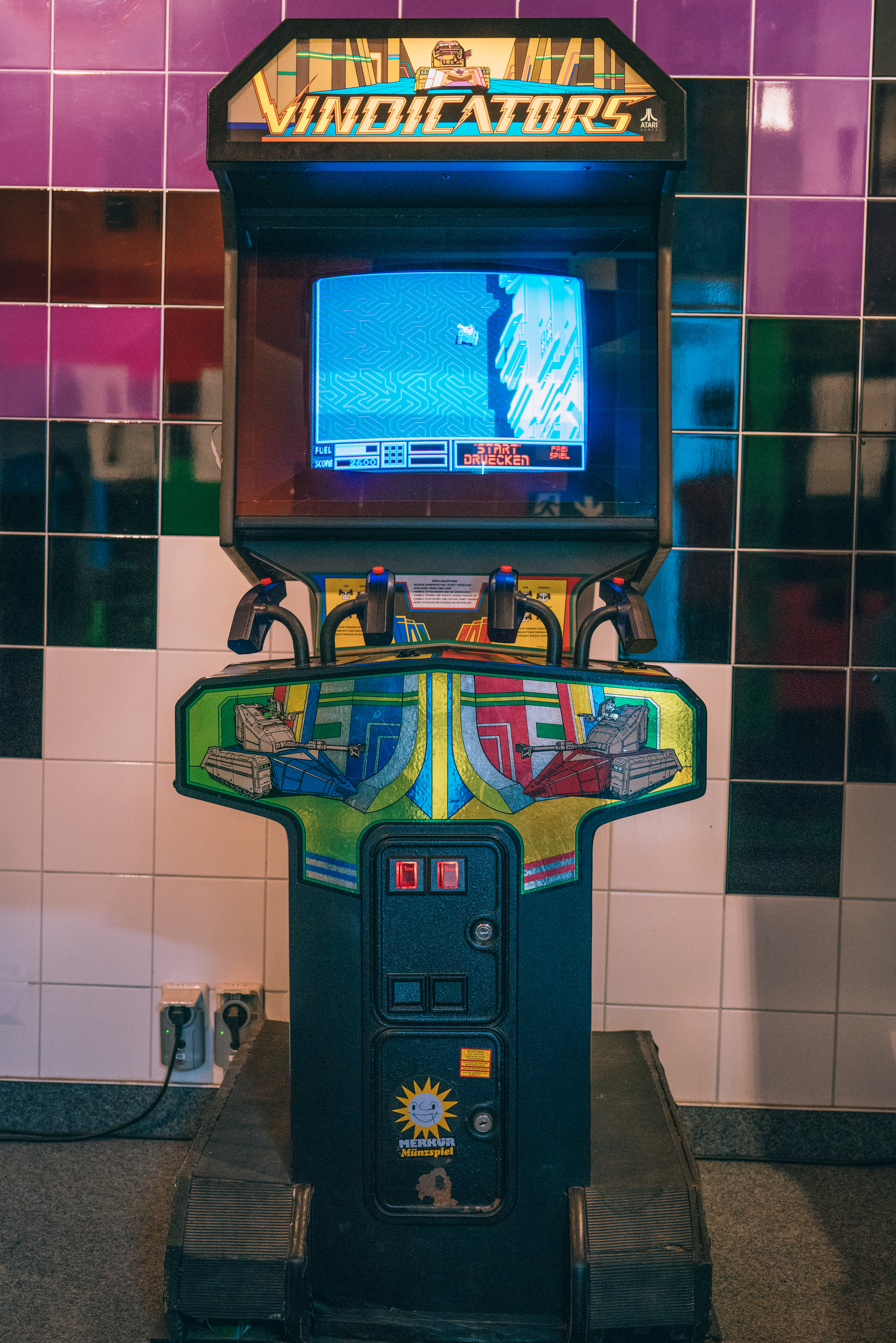
Vindicators arcade machine in the Computerspielemuseum Berlin.

== Reception ==
Reception

Award
Publication	Award
Amstrad Action	Mastergame

== Legacy ==
Vindicators Part II

A sequel to the arcade version was released the same year as a conversion kit for Gauntlet titled Vindicators Part II. Only approximately 400 units were made. There are only a few minor differences as the gameplay is nearly identical to the first, even keeping 10 of the 14 original stations of the first Vindicators. It even keeps the old graphics, music and sound. Though the in-game voice was changed to a less robotic-sounding male, and several tank upgrades were added that are picked up as powerups and expire after a level is finished.

Vindicators Part II was included in the 2012 compilation Midway Arcade Origins for PlayStation 3 and Xbox 360.
