= List of video games by Midway Games =

This is a list of video games developed and/or published by Midway Games. Most games are owned by Warner Bros. Games unless otherwise noted.

== List of original video games ==
Game	Details
Gun Fight Original release date: November 1975	Release years by system: 1975 – Arcade
Gun Fight Original release date: November 1975	Notes: Based on Taito's Western Gun
Sea Wolf Original release date: 1976	Release years by system: 1976 – Arcade
280 ZZZAP Original release date: 1976	Release years by system: 1976 – Arcade
Amazing Maze Original release date: 1976	Release years by system: 1976 – Arcade
Tornado Baseball Original release date: 1976	Release years by system: 1976 – Arcade
Boot Hill Original release date: 1977	Release years by system: 1977 – Arcade
Checkmate Original release date: 1977	Release years by system: 1977 – Arcade
Checkmate Original release date: 1977	Notes: A multiplayer snake game similar to Blockade
Desert Gun Original release date: 1977	Release years by system: 1977 – Arcade
Double Play Original release date: 1977	Release years by system: 1977 – Arcade
Double Play Original release date: 1977	Notes: Baseball
Guided Missile Original release date: 1977	Release years by system: 1977 – Arcade
M-4 Original release date: 1977	Release years by system: 1977 – Arcade
Blue Shark Original release date: 1978	Release years by system: 1978 – Arcade
Clowns Original release date: 1978	Release years by system: 1978 – Arcade
Dog Patch Original release date: 1978	Release years by system: 1978 – Arcade
Sea Wolf II Original release date: 1978	Release years by system: 1978 – Arcade
Sea Wolf II Original release date: 1978	Notes: Midway's first color game
Shuffleboard Original release date: 1978	Release years by system: 1978 – Arcade
Space Walk Original release date: 1978	Release years by system: 1978 – Arcade
4 Player Bowling Alley Original release date: April 1979	Release years by system: 1979 – Arcade
Extra Bases Original release date: 1980	Release years by system: 1980 – Arcade
Space Invaders II Original release date: 1980	Release years by system: 1980 – Arcade
Space Invaders II Original release date: 1980	Notes: US-exclusive sequel with competitive two-player mode
Space Zap Original release date: 1980	Release years by system: 1980 – Arcade
Wizard of Wor Original release date: 1981	Release years by system: 1981 – Arcade
The Adventures of Robby Roto! Original release date: 1981	Release years by system: 1981 – Arcade
Gorf Original release date: 1981	Release years by system: 1981 – Arcade
Kick Original release date: 1981	Release years by system: 1981 – Arcade
Omega Race Original release date: 1981	Release years by system: 1981 – Arcade
Ms. Pac-Man Original release date: 1981	Release years by system: 1981 – Arcade
Ms. Pac-Man Original release date: 1981	Notes: Developed by General Computer Corporation; Maze game
Solar Fox Original release date: 1981	Release years by system: 1981 – Arcade
Tron Original release date: 1982	Release years by system: 1982 – Arcade
Blue Print Original release date: 1982	Release years by system: 1982 – Arcade
Kozmik Krooz'r Original release date: 1982	Release years by system: 1982 – Arcade
Satan's Hollow Original release date: 1982	Release years by system: 1982 – Arcade
Spy Hunter Original release date: 1983	Release years by system: 1983 – Arcade
Spy Hunter Original release date: 1983	Notes: Vehicular combat game
Professor Pac-Man Original release date: 1983	Release years by system: 1983 – Arcade
Discs of Tron Original release date: 1983	Release years by system: 1983 – Arcade
NFL football Original release date: 1983	Release years by system: 1983 – Arcade
Domino Man Original release date: 1983	Release years by system: 1983 – Arcade
Jump Shot Original release date: 1983	Release years by system: 1983 – Arcade
Wacko Original release date: 1983	Release years by system: 1983 – Arcade
Tapper Original release date: 1983	Release years by system: 1983 – Arcade
Jr. Pac-Man Original release date: 1983	Release years by system: 1983 – Arcade
Journey Original release date: 1983	Release years by system: 1983 – Arcade
Crater Raider Original release date: 1984	Release years by system: 1984 – Arcade
Demolition Derby Original release date: 1984	Release years by system: 1984 – Arcade
Two Tigers Original release date: 1984	Release years by system: 1984 – Arcade
Timber Original release date: 1984	Release years by system: 1984 – Arcade
Zwackery Original release date: 1984	Release years by system: 1984 – Arcade
Sarge Original release date: 1985	Release years by system: 1985 – Arcade
Shoot the Bull Original release date: 1985	Release years by system: 1985 – Arcade
Max RPM Original release date: 1986	Release years by system: 1986 – Arcade
Rampage Original release date: 1986	Release years by system: 1986 – Arcade
Rampage Original release date: 1986	Notes: Action game
Star Guards Original release date: 1986	Release years by system: 1986 – Arcade
Power Drive Original release date: 1987	Release years by system: 1987 – Arcade
Rescue Raider Original release date: 1987	Release years by system: 1987 – Arcade
Spy Hunter II Original release date: 1987	Release years by system: 1987 – Arcade
Xenophobe Original release date: 1987	Release years by system: 1987 – Arcade
Blasted Original release date: 1988	Release years by system: 1988 – Arcade
Arch Rivals Original release date: 1989	Release years by system: 1989 – Arcade
Arch Rivals Original release date: 1989	Notes: Sports game
Trog Original release date: 1990	Release years by system: 1990 – Arcade
Pigskin 621 A.D. Original release date: 1990	Release years by system: 1990 – Arcade
Pigskin 621 A.D. Original release date: 1990	Notes: Sports game
Total Carnage Original release date: January 1992	Release years by system: 1992 – Arcade; 1993 – SNES; 1994 – Game Boy, Amiga, Amiga CD32, MS-DOS; 2005 – Atari Jaguar
Total Carnage Original release date: January 1992	Notes: Multidirectional shooter game
Terminator 2: Judgment Day Original release date: October 31, 1991	Release years by system: 1991 – Arcade
Terminator 2: Judgment Day Original release date: October 31, 1991	Notes: Shooter game
Super High Impact Original release date: 1991	Release years by system: 1991 – Arcade; 1992 – Sega Genesis; 1993 – SNES
Super High Impact Original release date: 1991	Notes: Sports game
Strike Force Original release date: 1991	Release years by system: 1991 – Arcade
Strike Force Original release date: 1991	Notes: Scrolling shooter game
Mortal Kombat Original release date: October 8, 1992	Release years by system: 1992 – Arcade; 1993 – SNES, Game Gear, Game Boy, Genesis, Master System; 1994 – MS-DOS, Sega CD, Amiga; 2004 – Mobile
Mortal Kombat Original release date: October 8, 1992	Notes: Fighting game
NBA Jam Original release date: 1993	Release years by system: 1993 – Arcade; 1993 – SNES, Game Gear, Genesis; 1994 – Game Boy, Sega CD, Amiga; 2004 – Mobile
NBA Jam Original release date: 1993	Notes: Sports game
Mortal Kombat II Original release date: November 12, 1993	Release years by system: 1993 – Arcade; 1994 – 32X, SNES, Game Gear, Genesis, Amiga; 1995 – MS-DOS; 1996 – Sega Saturn, PlayStation; 2007 – PlayStation 3
Mortal Kombat II Original release date: November 12, 1993	Notes: Fighting game
Revolution X Original release date: June 16, 1994	Release years by system: 1994 – Arcade; 1996 – MS-DOS; 1995 – Sega Genesis, SNES, Sega Saturn
Revolution X Original release date: June 16, 1994	Notes: Shooting gallery game
Killer Instinct Original release date: October 28, 1994	Release years by system: 1994 – Arcade
Killer Instinct Original release date: October 28, 1994	Notes: Distributed only; Developed by Rare and licensed by Nintendo; Fighting game
Cruis'n USA Original release date: November 1994	Release years by system: 1994 – Arcade; 1996 – Nintendo 64
Cruis'n USA Original release date: November 1994	Notes: Distribution only; developed by TV Games Inc. and licensed by Nintendo; Racing game
Mortal Kombat 3 Original release date: April 15, 1995	Release years by system: 1995 – Arcade, Genesis, PlayStation, SNES, Game Boy; 1996 – Game Gear, PC, Master System
Mortal Kombat 3 Original release date: April 15, 1995	Notes: Fighting game
WWF WrestleMania: The Arcade Game Original release date: 1995	Release years by system: 1995 – Arcade, Genesis, PlayStation, SNES, Game Boy, Sega Saturn; 1997 – PC
WWF WrestleMania: The Arcade Game Original release date: 1995	Notes: Sports game
2 on 2 Open Ice Challenge Original release date: November 1, 1995	Release years by system: 1995 – Arcade; 1996 – PlayStation; 1997 – Microsoft Windows
2 on 2 Open Ice Challenge Original release date: November 1, 1995	Notes: Sports game
Ultimate Mortal Kombat 3 Original release date: November 6, 1995	Release years by system: 1996 – Arcade, Sega Saturn, Genesis, SNES; 2001 – Game Boy Advance; 2006 – Xbox Live Arcade; 2007 – Nintendo DS; 2011 – PlayStation Network
Ultimate Mortal Kombat 3 Original release date: November 6, 1995	Notes: Fighting game
War Gods Original release date: 1996	Release years by system: 1996 – Arcade; 1997 – PlayStation, Nintendo 64, Windows
War Gods Original release date: 1996	Notes: Fighting game
NBA Hangtime Original release date: April 16, 1996	Release years by system: 1996 – Arcade, Genesis, Windows, SNES; 1997 – Nintendo 64, PlayStation
NBA Hangtime Original release date: April 16, 1996	Notes: Sports game
Killer Instinct 2 Original release date: 1996	Release years by system: 1996 – Arcade
Killer Instinct 2 Original release date: 1996	Notes: Distributed only; Developed by Rare and licensed from Nintendo; Fighting game
Mortal Kombat Trilogy Original release date: 1996	Release years by system: 1996 – PlayStation, Nintendo 64, R-Zone; 1997 – Sega Saturn, MS-DOS, Windows; 1998 Game.com
Mortal Kombat Trilogy Original release date: 1996	Notes: Fighting game
Area 51 Original release date: September 30, 1996	Release years by system: 1996 – Windows, Nintendo 64, PlayStation
Area 51 Original release date: September 30, 1996	Notes: Ports of an Atari Games title
Wayne Gretzky's 3D Hockey Original release date: November 11, 1996	Release years by system: 1996 – Nintendo 64
Wayne Gretzky's 3D Hockey Original release date: November 11, 1996	Notes: Port of an Atari Games title
Cruis'n World Original release date: November 1996	Release years by system: 1996 – Arcade; 1998 – Nintendo 64
Cruis'n World Original release date: November 1996	Notes: Licensed by Nintendo; Racing game
Off Road Challenge Original release date: 1997	Release years by system: 1997 – Arcade; 1998 – Nintendo 64
Off Road Challenge Original release date: 1997	Notes: Racing game
Doom 64 Original release date: April 4, 1997	Release years by system: 1997 – Nintendo 64
Doom 64 Original release date: April 4, 1997	Notes: First-person shooter
Rampage World Tour Original release date: March 1997	Release years by system: 1997 – Arcade, PlayStation, Sega Saturn; 1998 – Nintendo 64, Game Boy Color
Rampage World Tour Original release date: March 1997	Notes: Developed by Game Refuge Inc.; Action game
Maximum Force Original release date: September 30, 1997	Release years by system: 1997 – PlayStation, Sega Saturn, Windows
Maximum Force Original release date: September 30, 1997	Notes: Ports of an Atari Games title
Mace: The Dark Age Original release date: October 1997	Release years by system: 1997 – Nintendo 64
Mace: The Dark Age Original release date: October 1997	Notes: Port of an Atari Games title
Top Gear Rally Original release dates: NA: October 1997; EU: November 1997; JP: December 5, 1997	Release years by system: 1997 – Nintendo 64
Top Gear Rally Original release dates: NA: October 1997; EU: November 1997; JP: December 5, 1997	Notes: Developed by Boss Game Studios; Racing game
Mortal Kombat Mythologies: Sub-Zero Original release dates: NA: October 1, 1997; EU: December 2, 1997	Release years by system: 1997 – PlayStation, Nintendo 64
Mortal Kombat Mythologies: Sub-Zero Original release dates: NA: October 1, 1997; EU: December 2, 1997	Notes: Action-adventure game; First Mortal Kombat game to feature side-scrolling gameplay
Mortal Kombat 4 Original release date: October 15, 1997	Release years by system: 1997 – Arcade; 1998 – Nintendo 64, PlayStation, Windows, Game Boy Color
Mortal Kombat 4 Original release date: October 15, 1997	Notes: Fighting game
San Francisco Rush: Extreme Racing Original release date: November 8, 1997	Release years by system: 1997 – Nintendo 64; 1998 – PlayStation
San Francisco Rush: Extreme Racing Original release date: November 8, 1997	Notes: Ports of an Atari Games title
NBA Fastbreak '98 Original release date: November 27, 1997	Release years by system: 1997 – PlayStation
NBA Fastbreak '98 Original release date: November 27, 1997	Notes: Developed by Visual Concepts; Sports game
Chopper Attack Original release dates: JP: November 28, 1997; NA: June 17, 1998; PAL: September 1, 1998	Release years by system: 1997 – Nintendo 64
Chopper Attack Original release dates: JP: November 28, 1997; NA: June 17, 1998; PAL: September 1, 1998	Notes: Developed by SETA Corporation; Third-person shooter
NFL Blitz Original release date: 1997	Release years by system: 1997 – Arcade
NFL Blitz Original release date: 1997	Notes: Sports game
Hyperdrive Original release date: 1998	Release years by system: 1998 – Arcade
Hyperdrive Original release date: 1998	Notes: Racing game
Quake Original release date: March 24, 1998	Release years by system: 1998 – Nintendo 64
Quake Original release date: March 24, 1998	Notes: Developed by id Software; First-person shooter
Assault: Retribution Assault Original release dates: EU: September 1998; NA: November 18, 1998	Release years by system: 1998 – PlayStation
Assault: Retribution Assault Original release dates: EU: September 1998; NA: November 18, 1998	Notes: Developed by Candle Light Studios; Action game
CarnEvil Original release date: October 31, 1998	Release years by system: 1998 – Arcade
CarnEvil Original release date: October 31, 1998	Notes: Light gun rail shooter game
Rush 2: Extreme Racing USA Original release date: November 10, 1998	Release years by system: 1998 – Nintendo 64
Rush 2: Extreme Racing USA Original release date: November 10, 1998	Notes: Developed by Midway; Racing game
Twisted Edge Extreme Snowboarding Original release dates: NA: November 10, 1998; PAL: March 12, 1999	Release years by system: 1998 – Nintendo 64
Twisted Edge Extreme Snowboarding Original release dates: NA: November 10, 1998; PAL: March 12, 1999	Notes: Developed by Boss Game Studio; Sports game
Bio F.R.E.A.K.S Original release date: 1998	Release years by system: 1998 – Arcade
NFL Blitz '99 Original release date: 1998	Release years by system: 1998 – Arcade
NFL Blitz 2000 Original release date: 1999	Release years by system: 1999 – Arcade, PlayStation, Nintendo 64, Dreamcast, Windows
NFL Blitz 2000 Original release date: 1999	Notes: Sports game
Cruis'n Exotica Original release date: 1999	Release years by system: 1999 – Arcade; 2000 – Nintendo 64, Game Boy Color
Cruis'n Exotica Original release date: 1999	Notes: Licensed by Nintendo; Racing game
Hydro Thunder Original release date: 1999	Release years by system: 1999 – Arcade, Dreamcast; 2000 – PlayStation, Nintendo 64
Invasion: The Abductors Original release date: 1999	Release years by system: 1999 – Arcade
Invasion: The Abductors Original release date: 1999	Notes: Light gun shooter game
NBA Showtime: NBA on NBC Original release date: 1999	Release years by system: 1999 – Arcade, Dreamcast, Nintendo 64, PlayStation; 2000 – Game Boy Color
NBA Showtime: NBA on NBC Original release date: 1999	Notes: Sports game
California Speed Original release date: February 28, 1999	Release years by system: 1999 – Nintendo 64
California Speed Original release date: February 28, 1999	Notes: Ports of an Atari Games title
World Driver Championship Original release dates: NA: May 31, 1999; EU: November 1999	Release years by system: 1999 – Nintendo 64
World Driver Championship Original release dates: NA: May 31, 1999; EU: November 1999	Notes: Developed by Boss Game Studios; Racing game
Gauntlet Legends Original release date: August 31, 1999	Release years by system: 1999 – Nintendo 64; 2000 – PlayStation, Dreamcast
Gauntlet Legends Original release date: August 31, 1999	Notes: Ports of an Atari Games title
Ready 2 Rumble Boxing Original release dates: NA: September 9, 1999; EU: 1999; JP: January 13, 2000	Release years by system: 1999 – Dreamcast, Nintendo 64, PlayStation, Game Boy Color
Ready 2 Rumble Boxing Original release dates: NA: September 9, 1999; EU: 1999; JP: January 13, 2000	Notes: Developed by Midway Studios San Diego; Fighting game
Mortal Kombat Gold Original release date: September 9, 1999	Release years by system: 1999 – Dreamcast
Mortal Kombat Gold Original release date: September 9, 1999	Notes: Fighting game; Developed by Eurocom; Updated version of Mortal Kombat 4
Offroad Thunder Original release date: September 21, 1999	Release years by system: 1999 – Arcade
Offroad Thunder Original release date: September 21, 1999	Notes: Sports game
NFL Blitz 2001 Original release date: 2000	Release years by system: 2000 – Dreamcast, Game Boy Color, Nintendo 64, PlayStation
NFL Blitz 2001 Original release date: 2000	Notes: Sports game
Gauntlet Dark Legacy Original release date: 2000	Release years by system: 2000 – Arcade; 2001 – PlayStation 2; 2002 – GameCube, Xbox, Game Boy Advance
Gauntlet Dark Legacy Original release date: 2000	Notes: Hack and slash game
Jackie Chan Stuntmaster Original release dates: NA: March 29, 2000; EU: 2000	Release years by system: 2000 – PlayStation
Jackie Chan Stuntmaster Original release dates: NA: March 29, 2000; EU: 2000	Notes: Developed by Radical Entertainment; Beat 'em up platform game
Mortal Kombat: Special Forces Original release date: June 30, 2000	Release years by system: 2000 – PlayStation
Mortal Kombat: Special Forces Original release date: June 30, 2000	Notes: Action-adventure game
4 Wheel Thunder Original release dates: NA: May 4, 2000; EU: June 9, 2000	Release years by system: 2000 – Dreamcast
4 Wheel Thunder Original release dates: NA: May 4, 2000; EU: June 9, 2000	Notes: Developed by Kalisto Entertainment; Racing game
Kurt Warner's Arena Football Unleashed Original release date: May 18, 2000	Release years by system: 2000 – PlayStation
Kurt Warner's Arena Football Unleashed Original release date: May 18, 2000	Notes: Sports game
Rampage Through Time Original release date: June 9, 2000	Release years by system: 2000 – PlayStation
Rampage Through Time Original release date: June 9, 2000	Notes: Developed by Avalanche Software; Action game
San Francisco Rush 2049 Original release date: September 5, 2000	Release years by system: 2000 – Nintendo 64, Game Boy Color, Dreamcast
San Francisco Rush 2049 Original release date: September 5, 2000	Notes: Developed by Midway Games West; Ports of an Atari Games title
Team Buddies Original release dates: EU: 15 September 2000; NA: 18 September 2000	Release years by system: 2000 – PlayStation
Team Buddies Original release dates: EU: 15 September 2000; NA: 18 September 2000	Notes: Developed by Psygnosis; Action game
Ready 2 Rumble Boxing: Round 2 Original release date: October 23, 2000	Release years by system: 2000 – Dreamcast, PlayStation, PlayStation 2, Nintendo 64; 2001 – Game Boy Advance
Ready 2 Rumble Boxing: Round 2 Original release date: October 23, 2000	Notes: Sports game
Formula One 2000 Original release date: October 4, 2000	Release years by system: 2000 – PlayStation, Game Boy Color
Formula One 2000 Original release date: October 4, 2000	Notes: Developed by Studio 33 and Tarantula Studios (Game Boy Color); Racing game
The Grid Original release date: 2000	Release years by system: 2000 – Arcade
The Grid Original release date: 2000	Notes: Third-person shooter
Arctic Thunder Original release date: December 1, 2000	Release years by system: 2000 – Arcade; 2001 – PlayStation 2, Xbox
Arctic Thunder Original release date: December 1, 2000	Notes: Racing game
CART Fury Championship Racing Original release date: 2000	Release years by system: 2000 – Arcade; 2001 – PlayStation 2
CART Fury Championship Racing Original release date: 2000	Notes: Racing game
NFL Blitz 2002 Original release date: 2001	Release years by system: 2001 – Game Boy Advance, GameCube, PlayStation 2, Xbox
NFL Blitz 2002 Original release date: 2001	Notes: Sports game
NFL Blitz 2002 Original release date: 2001	Release years by system: 2001 – Game Boy Advance, GameCube, PlayStation 2, Xbox
NFL Blitz 2002 Original release date: 2001	Notes: Sports game
Cruis'n Velocity Original release dates: NA: November 27, 2001; EU: February 8, 2002	Release years by system: 2001 – Game Boy Advance
Cruis'n Velocity Original release dates: NA: November 27, 2001; EU: February 8, 2002	Notes: Developed by Graphic State and licensed by Nintendo; Racing game
SpyHunter Original release dates: NA: September 24, 2001; EU: October 19, 2001	Release years by system: 2001 – PlayStation 2; 2002 – GameCube, Xbox, Game Boy Advance; 2003 – Windows, OS X, Zodiac
SpyHunter Original release dates: NA: September 24, 2001; EU: October 19, 2001	Notes: Vehicular combat game
Shadow Hearts Original release date: December 11, 2001	Release years by system: 2001 – PlayStation 2
Shadow Hearts Original release date: December 11, 2001	Notes: North America only; licensed from Sacnoth and Aruze; Role-playing
MLB Slugfest 2003 Original release date: 2002	Release years by system: 2002 – GameCube, PlayStation 2, Xbox
MLB Slugfest 2003 Original release date: 2002	Notes: Sports game
RedCard 2003 Original release date: 2002	Release years by system: 2002 – GameCube, PlayStation 2, Xbox
RedCard 2003 Original release date: 2002	Notes: Sports game
Gravity Games Bike: Street Vert Dirt Original release dates: NA: June 27, 2002; EU: September 27, 2002	Release years by system: 2002 – PlayStation 2, Xbox
Gravity Games Bike: Street Vert Dirt Original release dates: NA: June 27, 2002; EU: September 27, 2002	Notes: Extreme sports game
NHL Hitz 2003 Original release dates: NA: September 16, 2002; EU: November 1, 2002	Release years by system: 2001 – PlayStation 2, Xbox, GameCube; 2002 – Game Boy Advance
NHL Hitz 2003 Original release dates: NA: September 16, 2002; EU: November 1, 2002	Notes: Developed by Black Box Games and Exient Entertainment (Game Boy Advance); Sports game
Mortal Kombat: Deadly Alliance Original release date: November 16, 2002	Release years by system: 2002 – PlayStation 2, GameCube, Xbox, Game Boy Advance
Mortal Kombat: Deadly Alliance Original release date: November 16, 2002	Notes: Fighting game
Haven: Call of the King Original release date: November 18, 2002	Release years by system: 2002 – PlayStation 2
Haven: Call of the King Original release date: November 18, 2002	Notes: Developed by Traveller's Tales; Platform game
Dr. Muto Original release date: November 19, 2002	Release years by system: 2002 – PlayStation 2, Xbox, GameCube; 2003 – Game Boy Advance
Dr. Muto Original release date: November 19, 2002	Notes: Developed by Digital Eclipse (Game Boy Advance); Platform game
NHL Hitz Pro Original release dates: NA: September 25, 2003; EU: November 7, 2003 (PS2); EU: November 14, 2003 (Xbox)	Release years by system: 2001 – PlayStation 2, Xbox, GameCube
NHL Hitz Pro Original release dates: NA: September 25, 2003; EU: November 7, 2003 (PS2); EU: November 14, 2003 (Xbox)	Notes: Developed by Next Level Games; Sports game
Freaky Flyers Original release date: August 5, 2003	Release years by system: 2003 – PlayStation 2, Xbox, GameCube
Freaky Flyers Original release date: August 5, 2003	Notes: Racing game
RoadKill Original release date: October 13, 2003	Release years by system: 2003 – PlayStation 2, Xbox, GameCube
RoadKill Original release date: October 13, 2003	Notes: Developed by Terminal Reality; Vehicular combat game
Justice League: Chronicles Original release date: November 12, 2003	Release years by system: 2002 – Game Boy Advance
Justice League: Chronicles Original release date: November 12, 2003	Notes: Developed by Full Fat; Fighting game
The Suffering Original release date: March 8, 2004	Release years by system: 2004 – PlayStation 2, Xbox, Windows
The Suffering Original release date: March 8, 2004	Notes: Developed by Surreal Software; Survival horror game
NBA Ballers Original release date: April 6, 2004	Release years by system: 2004 – PlayStation 2, Xbox
NBA Ballers Original release date: April 6, 2004	Notes: Sports game
MLB Slugfest Loaded Original release date: 2004	Release years by system: 2004 – PlayStation 2, Xbox
MLB Slugfest Loaded Original release date: 2004	Notes: Sports game
Psi-Ops: The Mindgate Conspiracy Original release date: June 14, 2004	Release years by system: 2004 – PlayStation 2, Xbox, Windows
Psi-Ops: The Mindgate Conspiracy Original release date: June 14, 2004	Notes: Third-person shooter
Shadow Hearts: Covenant Original release date: September 27, 2004	Release years by system: 2004 – PlayStation 2
Shadow Hearts: Covenant Original release date: September 27, 2004	Notes: Licensed from Sacnoth and Aruze; Role-playing
Mortal Kombat: Deception Original release date: October 4, 2004	Release years by system: 2004 – PlayStation 2, Xbox; 2005 – GameCube; 2006 – PlayStation Portable
Mortal Kombat: Deception Original release date: October 4, 2004	Notes: The PlayStation Portable version is titled Mortal Kombat: Unchained; Fighting game
Narc Original release date: March 22, 2005	Release years by system: 2005 – PlayStation 2, Xbox
Narc Original release date: March 22, 2005	Notes: Developed by VIS Entertainment; Shooter
Unreal Championship 2: The Liandri Conflict Original release dates: NA: April 18, 2005; EU: April 22, 2005	Release years by system: 2005 – Xbox
Unreal Championship 2: The Liandri Conflict Original release dates: NA: April 18, 2005; EU: April 22, 2005	Notes: Developed by Epic Games; First-person shooter
Area 51 Original release date: April 25, 2005	Release years by system: 2005 – PlayStation 2, Xbox, Windows
Area 51 Original release date: April 25, 2005	Notes: Developed by Midway Studios Austin; First-person shooter
Mortal Kombat: Shaolin Monks Original release date: September 16, 2005	Release years by system: 2005 – PlayStation 2, Xbox
Mortal Kombat: Shaolin Monks Original release date: September 16, 2005	Notes: Developed by Midway Studios Los Angeles; Action-adventure game
The Suffering: Ties That Bind Original release date: September 26, 2005	Release years by system: 2005 – PlayStation 2, Xbox, Windows
The Suffering: Ties That Bind Original release date: September 26, 2005	Notes: Developed by Surreal Software; Survival horror game
L.A. Rush Original release dates: NA: October 10, 2005; EU: October 21, 2005	Release years by system: 2005 – PlayStation 2, Xbox; 2006 – Windows, PlayStation Portable
L.A. Rush Original release dates: NA: October 10, 2005; EU: October 21, 2005	Notes: Developed by Midway Studios – Newcastle; Racing game
Blitz: The League Original release date: October 17, 2005	Release years by system: 2005 – PlayStation 2, Xbox; 2006 – Xbox 360, PlayStation Portable
Blitz: The League Original release date: October 17, 2005	Notes: Sports game
Ed, Edd n Eddy: The Mis-Edventures Original release date: November 3, 2005	Release years by system: 2005 – Game Boy Advance, GameCube, PlayStation 2, Xbox, Windows
Ed, Edd n Eddy: The Mis-Edventures Original release date: November 3, 2005	Notes: Developed by Artificial Mind and Movement; Adventure platforming game
Gauntlet: Seven Sorrows Original release dates: NA: December 12, 2005; EU: March 24, 2006; AU: March 30, 2006	Release years by system: 2005 – PlayStation 2, Xbox
Gauntlet: Seven Sorrows Original release dates: NA: December 12, 2005; EU: March 24, 2006; AU: March 30, 2006	Notes: Hack and slash game
NBA Ballers: Phenom Original release date: March 28, 2006	Release years by system: 2006 – PlayStation 2, Xbox
NBA Ballers: Phenom Original release date: March 28, 2006	Notes: Sports game
Rampage: Total Destruction Original release dates: NA: April 24, 2006; EU: April 28, 2006 (PS2)	Release years by system: 2006 – PlayStation 2, GameCube, Wii
Rampage: Total Destruction Original release dates: NA: April 24, 2006; EU: April 28, 2006 (PS2)	Notes: Action game
NBA Ballers: Rebound Original release date: May 9, 2006	Release years by system: 2006 – PlayStation Portable
NBA Ballers: Rebound Original release date: May 9, 2006	Notes: Developed by Backbone Entertainment; Sports game
Rise and Fall: Civilizations at War Original release dates: June 12, 2006	Release years by system: 2006 - Windows
Rise and Fall: Civilizations at War Original release dates: June 12, 2006	Notes: Developed by Stainless Steel Studios; Hybrid Real-time strategy, third-person shooter
The Ant Bully Original release date: July 24, 2006	Release years by system: 2006 – PlayStation 2, GameCube, Windows, Wii, Game Boy Advance
The Ant Bully Original release date: July 24, 2006	Notes: Action-adventure game
SpyHunter: Nowhere to Run Original release date: September 5, 2006	Release years by system: 2006 – PlayStation 2, Xbox
SpyHunter: Nowhere to Run Original release date: September 5, 2006	Notes: Developed by Terminal Reality; Action/Racing game
The Grim Adventures of Billy & Mandy Original release date: September 25, 2006	Release years by system: 2006 – PlayStation 2, GameCube, Wii, Game Boy Advance
The Grim Adventures of Billy & Mandy Original release date: September 25, 2006	Notes: Developed by High Voltage Software and Full Fat (Game Boy Advance); Fighting game
Mortal Kombat: Armageddon Original release date: October 11, 2006	Release years by system: 2006 – PlayStation 2, Xbox; 2007 – Wii
Mortal Kombat: Armageddon Original release date: October 11, 2006	Notes: Fighting game
Happy Feet Original release date: November 14, 2006	Release years by system: 2006 – Wii, PlayStation 2, GameCube, Nintendo DS, Game Boy Advance, Microsoft Windows
Happy Feet Original release date: November 14, 2006	Notes: Developed by Artificial Mind and Movement
The Lord of the Rings Online Original release date: April 24, 2007	Release years by system: 2007 – Windows, OS X
The Lord of the Rings Online Original release date: April 24, 2007	Notes: Developed by Turbine; Massively multiplayer online role-playing game
Hour of Victory Original release dates: NA: June 25, 2007; AU: June 28, 2007; EU: June 29, 2007	Release years by system: 2007 – Xbox 360; 2008 – Windows
Hour of Victory Original release dates: NA: June 25, 2007; AU: June 28, 2007; EU: June 29, 2007	Notes: Developed by N-Fusion Interactive; First-person shooter
Aqua Teen Hunger Force Zombie Ninja Pro-Am Original release dates: NA: November 5, 2007; AU: November 15, 2007; EU: November 16, 2007	Release years by system: 2007 – PlayStation 2
Aqua Teen Hunger Force Zombie Ninja Pro-Am Original release dates: NA: November 5, 2007; AU: November 15, 2007; EU: November 16, 2007	Notes: Developed by Creat Studios; Massively multiplayer online role-playing game
Unreal Tournament 3 Original release dates: NA: November 19, 2007; EU: November 23, 2007; AU: November 29, 2007	Release years by system: 2007 – Windows, PlayStation 3; 2008 – Xbox 360
Unreal Tournament 3 Original release dates: NA: November 19, 2007; EU: November 23, 2007; AU: November 29, 2007	Notes: Developed by Epic Games; First-person shooter
Game Party Original release dates: NA: November 27, 2007; AU: February 14, 2008; EU: February 15, 2008	Release years by system: 2007 – Wii
Game Party Original release dates: NA: November 27, 2007; AU: February 14, 2008; EU: February 15, 2008	Notes: Developed by FarSight Studios; Party game
Stranglehold Original release date: September 7, 2007	Release years by system: 2007 – Xbox 360, Windows, PlayStation 3
Stranglehold Original release date: September 7, 2007	Notes: Third-person shooter
BlackSite: Area 51 Original release date: November 12, 2007	Release years by system: 2007 – Windows, Xbox 360, PlayStation 3
BlackSite: Area 51 Original release date: November 12, 2007	Notes: First-person shooter
Cruis'n Original release dates: NA: November 27, 2007; AU: February 14, 2008; EU: March 27, 2008	Release years by system: 2007 – Wii
Cruis'n Original release dates: NA: November 27, 2007; AU: February 14, 2008; EU: March 27, 2008	Notes: Developed by Just Games Interactive and licensed by Nintendo; Racing game
NBA Ballers: Chosen One Original release date: April 21, 2008	Release years by system: 2008 – Xbox 360, PlayStation 3
NBA Ballers: Chosen One Original release date: April 21, 2008	Notes: Sports game
TNA Impact! Original release date: September 9, 2008	Release years by system: 2008 – PlayStation 2, PlayStation 3, Xbox 360, Wii
TNA Impact! Original release date: September 9, 2008	Notes: Developed by Midway Studios Los Angeles; Sports game
Blitz: The League II Original release date: October 13, 2008	Release years by system: 2008 – Xbox 360, PlayStation 3
Blitz: The League II Original release date: October 13, 2008	Notes: Sports game
Mortal Kombat vs. DC Universe Original release date: November 16, 2008	Release years by system: 2008 – PlayStation 3, Xbox 360
Mortal Kombat vs. DC Universe Original release date: November 16, 2008	Notes: Fighting game
Wheelman Original release dates: NA: March 24, 2009; AU: March 26, 2009; EU: March 27, 2009	Release years by system: 2009 – Windows, PlayStation 3, Xbox 360
Wheelman Original release dates: NA: March 24, 2009; AU: March 26, 2009; EU: March 27, 2009	Notes: PAL versions only, North American publishing handled by Ubisoft; Action-adventure game

== List of licensed video games ==
The following titles were licensed by Midway from other companies.

=== Arcade ===
- Asteroid (Note: Originally developed by Atari, Inc.)
- Astron Belt (Note: Licensed from Sega.)
- Bank Panic
- Boot Hill (Note: Licensed from Taito.)
- Bosconian (Note: Licensed from Namco.)
- Bull Fight
- Bump 'n' Jump (Note: Licensed from Data East.)
- BurgerTime
- Flicky
- Galaxian
- Galaxy Ranger
- Galaga
- Gaplus (Galaga 3)
- Hit the Ice (Note: Developed with Williams Electronics and Taito.)
- Jr. Pac-Man
- Mappy
- Ms. Pac-Man
- Pac-Man
- Pac-Land
- Racer
- Rally-X
- Space Invaders
- Space Invaders Deluxe
- Super Pac-Man
- Super Speed Race
- SWAT
- Truxton
- TV Basketball
- Up'n Down
- Water Match
- Wheels
- Wheels II
- Winner
- Winner IV

== Cancelled ==
- Crank the Weasel
- Necessary Force
