= Brian Colin =

American video-game designer, artist and animator

- Born: November 4, 1956 (age 69)
- Occupations: Video game designer, artist, animator
- Known for: Rampage; Arch Rivals

Brian Colin (born November 4, 1956) is an American video-game designer, artist and animator. Among his best-known works are the coin-operated arcade games Rampage, Arch Rivals and Rampage: World Tour as well as General Chaos for the Sega Genesis game console. He is the CEO of Game Refuge, an independent video-game design and development studio with offices in Downers Grove, Illinois. He has been noted for his work in the field of bitmapped video-game graphics and animation, creating video-game sprites and tiled background graphics with a recognizable, identifiable style.

He can be seen across the country at gaming conventions.

== Career ==
Colin joined Bally/Midway as an artist and animator during the golden age of arcade video games. His first project was creating new character animation for the arcade game Discs of Tron, for which he was given onscreen credit. Between 1982 and 1984, he created in-game raster graphics and animation for numerous Bally/Midway arcade games, including Kozmik Krooz'r, Spy Hunter and Zwackery, the latter being the first game for which Colin was credited as a game designer.

1985's Sarge was designed by Colin along with Bally/Midway programmer Jeff Nauman. It was their first complete collaboration in a partnership that would continue into the 21st century. Their 1986 game Rampage was a success that set arcade earnings records; it was eventually ported to more than 25 different platforms and is still prominently featured in Midway arcade compilations for current systems.

Colin continued to work with other Bally/Midway programmers on games like Max RPM and Xenophobe, but as of 1988's Blasted, he collaborated primarily with Nauman. Their next two games were released after Bally/Midway was acquired by Williams Electronics in 1988: Arch Rivals in 1989 and Pigskin 621 A.D. in 1990. An easter egg in Xenophobe was seen with the second stage being named "Colin's Rock", as tribute to Brian Colin.

Colin left Williams/Bally/Midway to form the game development studio Game Refuge with Nauman in 1992. Starting with General Chaos in 1993, Colin has conceived and designed over 45 different video games under the Game Refuge brand, including the arcade games Rampage World Tour and Star Trek: Voyager. He has also branched out into video slot machine design, advergaming and touchscreen gaming. He continues to produce games for PCs and mobile platforms as the CEO of Game Refuge.

More recently he has attempted to create a sequel General Chaos called "General Chaos II: Sons of Chaos" with Kickstarter backing.

== Awards and honors ==
Colin's animated short film In Search of a Plot (1977) earned awards at the Chicago International Film Festival, the Melbourne International Amateur Film Festival, the Datsun/Playboy FOCUS International Film Festival, the National Student and Amateur Filmmakers' Festival of Comedy and CINE (Council on International Nontheatrical Events).

Colin is currently named as an inventor on three United States Patents related to the gaming industry.

In 2005, Colin was inducted into the White Castle Hall of Fame.

In 2019, Colin was introduced to the International Video Game Hall of Fame (http://www.ivghof.info/class-of-2019/).
