= Pigskin =

Pigskin may refer to:

- Pork rind, the culinary term for pigskin
- Pigskin, a kind of leather obtained from the tanning of pig skin
- Ball (gridiron football) (also a pigskin), a ball, roughly in the form of a prolate spheroid, used in the context of playing gridiron football
- Pigskin (video game), a 1979 video game by Acorn Software Products for the TRS-80
- Pigskin 621 A.D., an arcade game released in 1990 by Midway Manufacturing
- "Pigskin", the sixth song from the 2013 Hollywood Undead album Notes from the Underground
