= NHL Hitz Pro =

2003 video game

- PAL region Xbox cover art
- Developer: Next Level Games
- Publisher: Midway Sports
- Series: NHL Hitz
- Platforms: GameCube, Xbox, PlayStation 2
- Release: NA: September 25, 2003; EU: November 7, 2003 (PS2); EU: November 14, 2003 (Xbox)
- Genre: Sports
- Modes: Single-player, Multiplayer

NHL Hitz Pro is an ice hockey video game developed by Next Level Games and published by Midway Sports, in the NHL Hitz series. It was released in 2003 for the PlayStation 2, GameCube, and Xbox. Unlike the previous titles in the series, it has 5-on-5 gameplay instead of the usual 3-on-3 gameplay with the earlier titles. The game does not include penalty shots, and it is still an arcade-type hockey game like its predecessors. It also has a lot of hard hitting. The cover athlete of the game is Nicklas Lidström, and features commentary from Tim Kitzrow and Harry Teinowitz.

NHL Hitz Pro had the IIHF license, enabling it to use the jerseys of the Olympic hockey teams.

The game also has many game modes, one of the most popular being the "Pick-Up Hockey" game mode, where the game would turn into either a roller, street, or pond hockey match-up between two amateur teams.

== Features ==
NHL Hitz Pro features NHL-style gameplay for the first time, and although arcade-like features pop up from time to time, the game is far more realistic than the previous titles in the series. Among the changes to Hitz Pro are 5-on-5 gameplay, as opposed to the 3-on-3 action seen in NHL Hitz 2002 and 2003, less exaggerated player appearances and wrap arounds.

== Reception ==
Reception

Aggregate score
Aggregator	Score		
Aggregator	GameCube	PS2	Xbox
Metacritic	81/100	79/100	81/100

Review scores
Publication	Score		
Publication	GameCube	PS2	Xbox
Electronic Gaming Monthly	8/10 (Note: Three critics of Electronic Gaming Monthly gave the game each a score of 7.5/10, 8.5/10, and 8/10.)	8/10	8/10
Game Informer	8/10	8.25/10	8/10
GameRevolution	B	B	B
GameSpot	8.1/10	8.2/10	8.1/10
GameSpy	3/5	3/5	2/5
GameZone	8.5/10	9.2/10	9.2/10
IGN	8.6/10	8.6/10	8.6/10
Nintendo Power	3/5	N/A	N/A
Nintendo World Report	8/10	N/A	N/A
Official U.S. PlayStation Magazine	N/A	4/5	N/A
Official Xbox Magazine (US)	N/A	N/A	8/10
X-Play	N/A	3/5	N/A

NHL Hitz Pro received "favorable" reviews on all platforms according to the review aggregation website Metacritic. GamePro said of the game, "It's a tight three-way race on the hockey front this season, and the only real downside to Hitz is what its fans will actually appreciate: its heavily arcade-style approach. If you like your hockey more serious, EA's game falls halfway between Hitz and the technical, highly realistic ESPN game. If 'serious' is the last thing you associate with hockey games, you'll have a blast hammering out checks on Hitz' rink—especially since Midway's rolled back the price a notch." (Note: GamePro gave the game three 4/5 scores for graphics, control, and fun factor, and 4.5/5 for sound.)

The game was nominated for the "Console Action Sports Game of the Year" award at the Academy of Interactive Arts & Sciences' 7th Annual Interactive Achievement Awards, which went to SSX 3.
