= Rampage (franchise) =

- Genre: Action
- Developers: Midway Games (1986); Game Refuge (1997); Point of View (1997); Saffire (1998); Digital Eclipse (1998); Avalanche Software (1999–2000); Ninai Games (2001); Pipeworks Software (2006)
- Publishers: Warner Bros. Interactive Entertainment (2009–present); Midway Games (Europe 1997–99)
- Platforms: Arcade, Lynx, Commodore 64, Game Boy Advance, Game Boy Color, GameCube, Windows, NES, Nintendo 64, PlayStation, PlayStation 2, Saturn, Master System, Wii
- First release: Rampage; August 1986
- Latest release: Rampage; 2018

Rampage is a series of video games released by Midway (1986–2009) and Warner Bros. Interactive Entertainment (2009–present) for arcades and consoles. The player controls a human who, due to experiment-related accidents, has transformed into a giant monster. The player uses their chosen monster to destroy cities around the world while attacking or avoiding police and military forces working to stop it.

A film adaptation was released in 2018.

== Premise ==
Humans have been undergoing strange mutations into giant animalistic monsters due to experiments conducted by the nefarious Scumlabs. These monsters proceed to travel across Earth and beyond, ravaging everything in sight. Heavy inspiration is drawn from various monster movies such as King Kong and 1957's 20 Million Miles to Earth. The series' three central characters are George, a scientist transformed into a gorilla-based monster; Lizzie, a woman transformed into a reptilian monster; and Ralph, a man transformed into a monster akin to werewolves.

== Games ==
- Rampage (1986) - The experiments of Scumlabs causes George, Lizzie and Ralph to mutate into giant monsters who go on a rampage in the city while avoiding the military.
- Rampage World Tour (1997) - An explosion at Scumlabs releases George, Lizzie and Ralph who begin to destroy all of Scumlabs' locations throughout the world.
- Rampage 2: Universal Tour (1999) - Another accident releases a trio of new monsters consisting of the rhinoceros-based Boris, the mouse-based Curtis and the lobster-based Ruby, who go on a rampage and free George, Lizzie and Ralph from their confinement as an alien invasion occurs.
- Rampage Through Time (2000) - As Scumlabs uses a time machine to clean up the mess in the past, George and company return to Earth with a warthog monster named Harley where they use the time machine to wreak havoc upon the planet throughout history.
- Rampage Puzzle Attack (2001)
- Rampage: Total Destruction (2006) - Scumlabs has developed a new soda which turns thirty (forty in the Wii version) people into monsters. While most of them have been placed in cryogenic sleep, some have escaped and go on a rampage around the world while freeing the others.
- Rampage (2018) - Adapted from the film adaptation, serving as a reboot to the series.

== Film adaptation ==
A live-action film adaptation was released on April 13, 2018, directed by Brad Peyton and starring Dwayne Johnson. The film features the classic trio of George, Lizzie and Ralph, this time as mutated animals rather than transfigured humans.

To tie into the film, three separate video games were created. One is an arcade game created exclusively for Dave & Buster's who co-created the game alongside Adrenaline Amusements for their restaurant chain, and a augmented reality app called RAMPAGE: AR Unleashed, while the second is a free-to-play browser game called Rampage City Smash. The third is a virtual reality game called Project Rampage VR.
