= Bullfight (disambiguation) =

A Bullfight is a fight between a bull and a man

Bullfight, or The Bullfight may also refer to:

- Bullfight (Goya), 1824 painting by Goya
- The Bullfight, novelette by Yasushi Inoue 1949
- Bullfight, play with music by Rolando Valdés-Blain
- The Bullfight (La Course de taureaux, 1951) documentary film by Pierre Braunberger
- "Bullfight", song by A Day to Remember from Bad Vibrations 2016
- Bull Fight, 1984 video game
