= Two Tigers =

Two Tigers can refer to:

- Two Tigers (nursery rhyme) a Mandarin Chinese nursery rhyme
- When two tigers fight, a Chinese proverb
- Two Tigers (film), a 2006 action film
- The Two Tigers, a novel in the Sandokan series by Emilio Salgari
- Two Tigers (video game), a 1984 arcade game from Bally Midway
