= Game Refuge =

America video-game developer

- Type: Private
- Industry: Video games
- Founded: 1992
- Headquarters: Downers Grove, Illinois
- Key people: Brian Colin, Jeff Nauman (founders)
- Website: www.gamerefuge.com

Game Refuge Inc. is an independent video game developer with offices in Downers Grove, Illinois. It was founded in 1992 by Brian Colin and Jeff Nauman, the creators of Rampage, Arch Rivals, and many other arcade games for Bally/Midway. The company has developed over 45 games for a variety of platforms, including consoles, PCs, arcades, touchscreen countertop machines, casino gaming, mobile devices and Facebook.

== Selected games ==
Some of the more notable games conceived and developed by Game Refuge include:

- General Chaos – A multiplayer strategy/action game for the Sega Genesis. One of the first console games in the real-time tactics genre.
- Rampage World Tour – An arcade remake of the original Rampage game, by Colin and Nauman.
- Star Trek: Voyager – A light-gun arcade game set in the Star Trek universe, with new enemy characters created by Game Refuge, named "2002 Video Game of the Year" by Wal-Mart stores.
- Arctic Stud Poker Run – An online multiplayer snowmobile combat/racing/gambling game for Windows PCs. Based on real-life poker run events, participants race to build a winning poker hand.
- Space Goblinz – A side-scrolling space shoot 'em up, the highest-earning game made for the PlayPorTT entertainment system. Features the Game Refuge "mascot," a goblin who appears in many of the company's other games.

Game Refuge clients include Electronic Arts, Midway Manufacturing, WMS Industries, Team Play Inc., Merit Industries, Monaco Entertainment, American Laser Games, Komatsu America, West Creek Studios, TouchTunes Game Studio and The 3DO Company.
