= General Chaos =

1993 video game

- Developer: Game Refuge
- Publisher: Electronic Arts
- Designers: Brian Colin; Jeff Nauman
- Programmer: Jeff Nauman
- Artist: Brian Colin
- Composer: Michael Bartlow
- Platform: Sega Genesis
- Release: NA: August 1993; EU: September 1993
- Genre: Real-time tactics
- Modes: Single player, multiplayer

General Chaos is a video game developed by Game Refuge for the Sega Genesis and published by Electronic Arts in 1993. General Chaos is a satirical action/strategy game.

== Plot ==
Ever since they were babies, brothers Chaos and Havoc enjoyed playing war games with each other and their classmates and expanding their knowledge of military tactics. One day, Chaos discovers a rare comic book more valuable than any of the books in their ever-growing library and shows it to Havoc. Unfortunately, this proves to be a mistake, as the mere sight of it brings out his greedy and treacherous side. Havoc tries to take the book for himself, but it rips apart in a tug-of-war. After this, the two brothers blame each other and grow apart. Years later, they both become military dictators of the fictional countries of Moronica (Chaos) and Viceria (Havoc). The two generals have been at war with each other for decades, but for all the battles that rage across the land, they cannot achieve victory. After days of consideration, they come to the decision of using smaller, quicker armies of soldiers, all specializing in a particular kind of weapon to settle the score permanently.

== Gameplay ==
The game is a quick and dirty battle (or a longer campaign mode that is a series of battles fought over a dynamic strategic map) between two generals, "General Chaos" and "General Havoc". The objective of the game is to capture the enemy's capital city.

Each player has to pick one of 4 teams, 3 of which have 5 soldiers (with differing selections of weapons), while one has 2 "commandos" and uses a different control system, giving greater control.

The player views the action from an isometric perspective, watching cartoon soldiers duke it out on the battlefield. The game features a balance between action and strategy. For instance, whenever two soldiers on opposite sides get close enough, close combat will ensue. The soldiers can punch, kick, or block the attack. If one of the player's men loses all his health points, he will fall down on the ground. To help the fallen soldier, the player must move the cursor, or another soldier in the case of the commandos, close to the injured soldier and call out for a medic to revive him. However, there is a limit on the number of times that a medic may be called. There are also many items that yield points on the battlefield to pick up; additional medic uses are awarded for breaking certain point thresholds.

With a multiplayer adapter, up to four people can play simultaneously against the computer in campaign mode. The player can also fight other human players without co-operation. Another feature of the game is the tutorial mode called "boot camp".

== Classes ==
Gunner: Uses a submachine gun as a weapon. The well-rounded unit of the game with a medium-range attack and high rate of fire, though his gun might jam, disabling him for a few seconds. He is used primarily for attacking. This character wears a buzz cut hairstyle.

Launcher: Uses a handheld rocket launcher as a weapon. While the game lacks a "sniper" character, the launcher serves essentially the same purpose with a powerful, slow-firing, long-range weapon. The launcher's attack can be stopped by cover but may randomly result in an "instant death" of an opposing combatant (reduced to a skeleton and therefore cannot call a medic). Can destroy bonus objective targets. This character wears a helmet.

Chucker: Grenades are the weapon of this class. Their attack has a low rate of fire and is easily avoidable, but the grenade goes over cover, can damage multiple units, and has good range. Can destroy bonus objective targets. The name and the appearance of this unit (a bearded, red- or blond-haired man with a Rambo-style headband) is a clear reference to Chuck Norris.

Scorcher: Possibly the most dangerous unit in the game, these soldiers use a flamethrower to do damage which, despite having the shortest range, can hit multiple soldiers at once and is the fastest-firing weapon. Once a Scorcher is on top of another unit, it is very difficult to survive. Because of this capability, they make excellent flanking and escort units. Attack may randomly result in an "instant death" of an opposing combatant (reduced to a pile of ash and therefore cannot call a medic). If the Scorcher goes into water, his weapon will be temporarily disabled (indicated by bubbles being shot out instead of fire). He wears a pair of dark glasses.

Blaster: The Blaster is similar to the Chucker. Instead of using grenades, he throws a bunch of dynamite sticks which go over cover and inflict heavy damage within a small area. However, he has an extremely slow rate of fire and the second shortest attack range, limiting his tactical effectiveness. Attack may randomly result in an "instant death" of an opposing combatant (reduced to a skeleton and therefore can't call a medic). Can destroy bonus objective targets. This character wears an eye patch and a beard, and his smile lacks some teeth.

== Reception ==
Reception

Review scores
Publication	Score
Electronic Gaming Monthly	8/10
VideoGames & Computer Entertainment	8/10

General Chaos received generally positive reviews. Electronic Gaming Monthly gave the game an 8 out of 10, calling it "the ultimate one-on-one "fighting" game!" They praised the humor, wealth of options, and four-player mode. GamePro likewise praised the humor and the four-player mode, as well as the enemy AI, and summarized that "General Chaos combines brain-squeezing battlefield strategy, challenging squad tactics, and real-time button-pressing combat with humorous cartoon graphics." In 2017, GamesRadar listed the game 48th on their "Best Sega Genesis/Mega Drive games of all time."

== Legacy ==
On September 6, 2013, Brian F. Colin started a Kickstarter campaign in order to fund a sequel. The campaign fell more than $100,000 short of its goal.
