= Tao Feng: Fist of the Lotus =

2003 video game

- Developer: Studio Gigante
- Publisher: Microsoft Game Studios
- Designers: John Tobias, Joshua Tsui, David Michicich (creators); Chris Granner, Daniel Myer (music / sounds)
- Platform: Xbox
- Release: NA: March 18, 2003; EU: May 9, 2003
- Genre: Fighting
- Modes: Single-player, multiplayer

Tao Feng: Fist of the Lotus is a 2003 fighting game developed by Studio Gigante and published by Microsoft Game Studios for the Xbox. It was designed by Studio Gigante co-founder John Tobias, the co-creator of the Mortal Kombat fighting game series. Tao Feng was Studio Gigante's first project and Tobias' first after his departure from Midway.

Tobias envisioned Tao Feng with an emphasis on intensity and realism, including having damage effects on the fighters and interactive environments. Upon release, the game received mixed reviews.

== Plot ==
Tao Feng takes place in Metro China, the largest population center in New China, a fictional country occupying the Pacific coast of North America. With Mexico to the south, Canada to the north, and the United States to the east, New China is a sovereign nation, independent from the People's Republic of China. The story is based upon years of conflict between two ancient Chinese sects: the Pale Lotus and the Black Mantis. The leader of the Pale Lotus has been known through the generations as the Master Sage, and for as long as there have been a Black Mantis sect, their leader has been called Wulong Goth.

The members of these sects have battled for centuries and now the fight has intensified over two tablets that contain riddles revealing the hiding places of the long lost treasures of the Pale Lotus temple. According to legend, these treasures may be used to bargain with the gods of immortality. One tablet, the Yang tablet, is rightfully still in the possession of the Pale Lotus. However, the Yin tablet was stolen by force and has fallen into the hands of the Black Mantis. Through use of the tablets, both sects hope to recover the lost treasures and achieve immortality. The Pale Lotus hope to defend truth and harmony, while the Black Mantis serve a much darker purpose.

The characters in this game are:

- Master Sage - a wushu master, leader of the Pale Lotus sect.
- Jade Dragon - a female dragon monk, member of the Pale Lotus sect.
- Fiery Phoenix - a fiery male warrior, member of the Pale Lotus sect.
- Fierce Tiger - a female warrior that has the spirit of the tiger, member of the Pale Lotus sect.
- Iron Monk - a cybernetic robot fighter, member of the Pale Lotus sect.
- Divine Fist - a Chinese martial artist, member of the Pale Lotus sect.
- Wulong Goth - an alien-like creature, leader of the Black Mantis sect.
- Divinity - a heavenly goddess, member of the Black Mantis sect.
- The Fatalist - a ballistic serial killer, member of the Black Mantis sect.
- Geist - a female cyborg character, member of the Black Mantis sect.
- Vapor - a mysterious female exorcist, member of the Black Mantis sect.
- Exile - a muscular, bulky mutant fighter, member of the Black Mantis sect.
- Zhao Yen - the guardian of the Temple of Immortality, and final opponent in the game.

== Reception ==
Reception

Aggregate score
Aggregator	Score
Metacritic	65/100

Review scores
Publication	Score
Edge	5/10
Electronic Gaming Monthly	4.5/10 (Note: Three critics of Electronic Gaming Monthly gave the game each a score of 4/10, 6/10, and 3.5/10.)
Eurogamer	4/10
Famitsu	24/40
Game Informer	7.25/10
GameRevolution	C−
GameSpot	6.4/10
GameSpy	1/5
GameZone	5.5/10
IGN	8.7/10
Official Xbox Magazine (US)	7.4/10
X-Play	3/5
Maxim	5/5
The Village Voice	8/10

The game received "mixed" reviews according to the review aggregation website Metacritic. In Japan, where the game was ported for release on October 23, 2003, Famitsu gave it a score of all four sixes for a total of 24 out of 40. GamePro said that the game was "miles better than Kakuto Chojin, but it's still a few short steps behind Dead or Alive 3 and Mortal Kombat: Deadly Alliance. Regardless, this is a game that fighting fans should check out." (Note: GamePro gave the game two 4.5/5 scores for graphics and sound, and two 4/5 scores for control and fun factor.)
