= NHL Open Ice =

1995 video game

NHL Open Ice: 2 on 2 Challenge
- Windows cover art
- Developers: Midway Games; Avalanche Software (PS)
- Publishers: Midway Home Entertainment; GT Interactive
- Designer: Jack Haeger
- Platforms: Arcade, PlayStation, Windows
- Release: Arcade: NA: November 1995; PlayStation: NA: December 13, 1996; Windows: NA: September 1997; EU: 1997
- Genre: Sports (ice hockey)
- Modes: Single-player, multiplayer
- Arcade system: Midway Wolf Unit

NHL Open Ice: 2 on 2 Challenge is an ice hockey arcade video game released by Midway Games in 1995. It has been described as an ice hockey equivalent to Midway's NBA Jam.

NHL Open Ice was ported to the PlayStation in 1996 with updated rosters and teams from the 1996-97 season, the Winnipeg Jets having moved and become the Phoenix Coyotes. The game was released for Windows in 1996-1997, with the same roster and teams as the PlayStation version. The game is an official licensed product of the National Hockey League Players' Association.

== Development ==
Jack Haeger was lead game designer and an avid hockey player. The lead programmer was Mark Penacho, assisted by Bill Dabelstein. Sound design and music was by Jon Hey. The skating sounds were recorded by Jon Hey at the Chicago Park District's only indoor ice rink, McFetridge Sports Center, which is just a block north of what was once Midway's Chicago studios. The announcer in the game is the famous voice of the Chicago Blackhawks Pat Foley. If a team achieves "On-Fire" status (made famous initially by Midway's NBA Jam), Pat Foley's voice will occasionally announce: "Toasty", a reference to Mortal Kombat. A version of NHL Open Ice for Panasonic M2 was in development and slated to be one of the launch titles but it never occurred due to the system's cancellation.

== Reception ==
Reception

Review scores
Publication	Score		
Publication	Arcade	PC	PS
AllGame	4/5	3.5/5	2.5/5
CNET Gamecenter	N/A	7/10	N/A
Computer Games Strategy Plus	N/A	2.5/5	N/A
Computer Gaming World	N/A	2/5	N/A
Electronic Gaming Monthly	N/A	N/A	6.25/10 (Note: In Electronic Gaming Monthly's review of the PlayStation version, one critic gave it a score of 5/10, and the other gave it 7.5/10.)
Game Informer	N/A	N/A	7.5/10
GameFan	N/A	N/A	79% (Note: In GameFan's viewpoint of the PlayStation version, one critic gave it 73, and the other 85.)
GameSpot	N/A	7/10	7.1/10
Next Generation	3/5	N/A	2/5
PlayStation Official Magazine – UK	N/A	N/A	3/10

Reviewing the arcade version, Next Generation called the game "NBA Jam on ice", and said it would be particularly appreciated since arcade hockey games were almost unheard of at the time. They applauded the game's full NHL licensing and player rosters, flaming pucks, two-on-two mode, commentary, and overall depth and playability of its hockey action, and concluded that "Williams rarely makes a bad move, and Open Ice is testament to its conservative but consistent quality games." Bruised Lee of GamePro similarly said the game "proves that Midway will continue to dominate the arcade sports market long after the success of NBA Jam." He praised the numerous Easter eggs, sharp graphics, fluid animation, and variety of moves. (Note: GamePro gave the arcade version two 4.5/5 scores for graphics and control, 4/5 for sound, and 5/5 for fun factor.) Brad Cook of AllGame called the same game "a must play for any hockey fan."

In 1996 the arcade version was placed on display in the Hockey Hall of Fame.

The PlayStation and PC versions divided reviewers. Jeff Kitts of GameSpot, The Rookie of GamePro, and Dean Hager of Electronic Gaming Monthly all agreed that it offered fun and fast NBA Jam-style hockey and was a faithful translation of the arcade version. Kitts acknowledged problems with the animations but praised the inclusion of novelty power-up codes, and judged the game an overall refreshing break from realistic hockey sims. The Rookie went so far as to say that it "shoots and scores at every level." (Note: GamePro gave the PlayStation version 4/5 for graphics, two 4.5/5 scores for sound and fun factor, and 5/5 for control.) In contrast, Hager's co-reviewer Kraig Kujawa said it "doesn't seem to capture the magic that made [NBA Jam] so popular", and that it compares poorly to its similar contemporary, Wayne Gretzky's 3D Hockey for the Nintendo 64. Next Generation agreed that it simply lacked the spark of NBA Jam, and also "fails to capture the coin-op's flashy essence", citing smaller characters, missing frames of animation, a weaker color palette, and missing audio effects compared to the arcade version. Official UK PlayStation Magazine said that players should "avoid the game at all costs."

Stephen Poole of GameSpot said of the PC version, "NHL Open Ice isn't the kind of game you'll play for hours on end, but it is the kind that you can fire up just about any time for 20 or 30 minutes of fun, or leave running at your next party for your guests to enjoy. Except for the graphics in the full-screen mode, they'll think they're at the arcade - and with a game like this, you can't ask any more than that."

== See also ==
- Hit the Ice
- NHL Hitz (disambiguation)
