= Star Trek: Voyager – The Arcade Game =

2002 video game

Star Trek: Voyager — The Arcade Game
- Two player arcade cabinet
- Developer: Game Refuge Inc.
- Publishers: Monaco Entertainment; Team Play Inc.
- Directors: Brian Colin; Jeff Nauman
- Platform: Arcade
- Release: NA: 2002
- Genre: Light gun game
- Modes: Single-player, multiplayer

Star Trek: Voyager — The Arcade Game is a first-person style shooter arcade game, produced by Monaco Entertainment and Team Play Inc. and released in 2002. It was inspired by The House of the Dead and was based on the hit science fiction television show Star Trek: Voyager, which had aired on UPN from 1995 to 2001.

== Gameplay ==
Voyager is played as a rail shooter. Players are given light guns to combat on-screen enemies.

Star Trek: Voyager — The Arcade Game is a House of the Dead-style light gun game played from the first-person shooter perspective. The player uses a light gun which can be aimed and fired at on-screen enemies. The reloading process is referred to as remodulation, a term used in Star Trek, and is done by shooting the gun off-screen.

Much of the game takes place on the USS Voyager, shooting various alien intruders such as the Borg, Hirogen Hunters, Species 8472 as well as several other alien species from the Star Trek universe. The game has several missions players can select as the game progresses. Some missions involve flight in the Delta Flyer, one of the shuttles used by the crew of the USS Voyager. During these sequences players attack Borg vessels such as Borg Cubes and Spheres.

== Development and release ==
The game was generally released in a large game unit, known as the Deluxe cabinet version, or a stand-alone smaller unit was available for smaller sites where space was an issue. The Deluxe cabinet variant permitted players to sit down and was a fully enclosed unit. The cabinet was designed to be folded into four separate pieces for transport, with the roof being fully removable, as is the floor, and the ends of the game come ready on swivel wheels. The game was very successful onsite for operators and although the Star Trek Voyager series had finished some two years prior to its release. The original license from Paramount Pictures was obtained by Frank J. Pelligreni, President of Team Play Inc, and proved to be a very successful design and product for the company. The license and distribution of the game was granted only to the United States, so no units were exported outside of the US in brand new form, however, some units have been sold when 2nd hand and have made their way into collectors hands in Australia and possibly Japan, but less than half a dozen units, according to the game's original designer, Team Play Inc.

== Reception ==
Star Trek: Voyager – The Arcade Game received mixed reception from cooperative gaming website Co-Optimus. Editor Marc Allie was rather critical of the repetitive gameplay, citing that there was not enough variety to enemies, and citing primarily Borg drones as the primary targets. He panned the other enemies, stating that they didn't seem to fit well in the game. "When Star Trek Voyager The Arcade Game does throw a little variety into the action, it's wildly out of place [...] these critters look like something out of Doom or Voltron, not Voyager!" Allie did praise the design of the arcade cabinet and the game's large screen, but felt that the generic light guns used took away from the Star Trek feel. The game was featured at the AMOA International Show 2004, where it was showcased along with some of Team Play's other titles, including Police Trainer 2 and Crossfire: Maximum Paintball.
