= NHL Hitz 2002 =

2001 video game

- North American GameCube cover art featuring Scott Stevens
- Developer: Black Box Games
- Publisher: Midway
- Designer: Daniel Rosado
- Series: NHL Hitz
- Platforms: GameCube, Xbox, PlayStation 2
- Release: PlayStation 2: NA: September 25, 2001; EU: November 16, 2001; Xbox: NA: November 15, 2001; EU: March 14, 2002; GameCube: NA: November 18, 2001; EU: May 10, 2002
- Genre: Sports
- Modes: Single-player, multiplayer

NHL Hitz 2002 is an arcade-style ice hockey video game released by Midway in September 2001 for PlayStation 2 and November for GameCube and Xbox. It is the first game of the NHL Hitz series. Midway launched the game along with NFL Blitz.

== Summary ==
This video game was a launch title for both the Xbox and the GameCube and was also released on PlayStation 2. It differs from traditional NHL games in that it does not try to accurately simulate real-life ice hockey. The rules are much more relaxed and the attributes of players dramatically increased, giving the game its arcade feel.

The game features three players on the ice for each team, with an additional 3 players on each teams' bench. Line changes could be done in between periods. Fights were included in the game, but the rules of such greatly differed from NHL rules. Fights last until a player is knocked out, and the losing player is taken out of the game permanently. Since there are only 6 players per team, after one team loses 3 fights, no additional fights are allowed. Hits are encouraged rather than penalized, with players able to knock over other players to temporarily remove them from play, incurring no penalties.

If a player scores 3 goals in one game on their respective team that player becomes "On Fire", making them tougher to knock down and giving them a more powerful shot. If any team scores three uninterrupted one-timers, they achieve "Team Fire" in which every player has Blue Flames surrounding them and have all the advantages of the aforementioned On Fire. There are no line changes during a period and there is no regular season play. The front cover features now retired NHL defenceman Scott Stevens of the New Jersey Devils.

The game had a skills competition section with multiple different challenges. Also featured was the ability to unlock sick heads, stadiums and throwback jerseys.

== Reception ==
Reception

Aggregate score
Aggregator	Score		
Aggregator	GameCube	PS2	Xbox
Metacritic	79/100	78/100	79/100

Review scores
Publication	Score		
Publication	GameCube	PS2	Xbox
AllGame	N/A	N/A	3.5/5
Electronic Gaming Monthly	N/A	N/A	8/10
EP Daily	N/A	9/10	N/A
Eurogamer	N/A	N/A	6/10
Game Informer	8/10	8.5/10	8.5/10
GameRevolution	N/A	B	N/A
GameSpot	7.2/10	6.7/10	7/10
GameSpy	68%	78%	N/A
IGN	7.4/10	7.6/10	8/10
Next Generation	N/A	4/5	4/5
Nintendo Power	3.5/5	N/A	N/A
Nintendo World Report	8/10	N/A	N/A
Official U.S. PlayStation Magazine	N/A	4/5	N/A
Official Xbox Magazine (US)	N/A	N/A	8.4/10

The game received "generally favorable reviews" on all platforms according to the review aggregation website Metacritic. Jim Preston of NextGen's final issue called the PlayStation 2 version "the best 'wacky' sports game we've played in years." The magazine similarly said of the Xbox version, "If you're up for a game of hockey where players quite literally catch on fire and suffer frequent flights through the glass, this is superb stuff." Atomic Dawg of GamePro said that the GameCube version "might not be real NHL hockey, but it might be all the hockey you really need." (Note: GamePro gave the GameCube version three 4/5 scores for graphics, sound, and control, and 4.5/5 for fun factor.) The D-Pad Destroyer said of the Xbox version, "It's no NHL 2002, but Hitz should be a blast for arcade sports fans." (Note: GamePro gave the Xbox version three 4.5/5 scores for graphics, sound, and control, and 4/5 for fun factor.) GameZone gave the same console version 9.1 out of 10, calling it "a terrific blend of arcade-style gaming (as in with the players steaming and bursting into flame) and straight-ahead sports simulation." However, X-Play gave the PlayStation 2 version two stars out of five, saying that it "has neither the gameplay nor the presentation to make its solid concept deliver. If you're truly desperate for a franchise mode in a hockey game, or if you've always wanted to play the Redwings with a team of gladiators, Hitz 2002 may be worth a rental or two. Considering that EA's NHL 2002 can be tweaked to be a much better arcade game than Hitz, there's no real reason to recommend this title."

The game won the awards for "Best Console Extreme Sports Game" and "Best Canadian Console Game of the Year" at The Electric Playground's 2001 Blister Awards, and was nominated for "Best Multiplayer Console Game" and "GameCube Game of the Year", but lost both to Halo: Combat Evolved and Star Wars Rogue Squadron II: Rogue Leader, respectively.
