= Rampage: Total Destruction =

2006 video game

- Developer: Pipeworks Software
- Publisher: Midway
- Designers: Mark Crowe; Simon Strange
- Composers: Sam Powell; Jim Soldi
- Series: Rampage
- Platforms: GameCube; PlayStation 2 Wii
- Release: GameCube & PlayStation 2: NA: 24 April 2006; EU: 28 April 2006 (PS2); Wii: NA: 19 November 2006; AU: 8 February 2007; EU: 9 February 2007
- Genre: Action
- Modes: Single-player, multiplayer

Rampage: Total Destruction is a sequel to the Rampage arcade game published by Midway, and the last installment in the franchise before the firm folded into Warner Bros. Interactive Entertainment, as well as the last game in the series to be available on home video game platforms. The game was released in April 2006 for the GameCube and PlayStation 2. It was also released on 19 November 2006 in North America for the Wii.

== Gameplay ==
Rampage: Total Destruction features multiplayer gameplay for up to four players.

Rampage: Total Destruction, as with previous games in the series, has players destroying the environment to earn points. Other actions are available in addition to destroying buildings; people can be eaten and players can also throw vehicles to cause more damage. New to the series is the ability to climb on the front of a building to destroy it. Hidden in each city are tokens which, when eaten, will unlock new characters and special abilities. Playing well fills a character's special meter which can be used to utilize special abilities such as Rampage mode or the Roar power.

Total Destruction features four game modes:

- The first is a campaign in which players work to progressively take out cities around the world while following a story. King of the City and King of the World are competitive modes where up to four players (or two in the PlayStation 2 version) compete.
- In "King of the City", players strive to rule a city by dominating the most districts.
- "King of the World" is a series of King of the City competitions across various cities.
- The fourth mode is a time trial mode.

== Plot ==
A worker from Scumlabs shows a video about a man named George taste-testing the Scum Soda. Soda S ends up causing a mutation to George as the video ends. The man tells his boss Mr. Z that the Scum Soda had a reaction to a few individuals. When Mr. Z asks how many people went through the taste-test and had a negative reaction, the man states 30 (40 in Wii). Mr. Z angrily states that if the press gets a hold of this, Scumlabs will be ruined. The man assures him that they contained the damage as the esteemed scientist Dr. Vector tells Mr. Z that all the monsters have been cryogenically frozen and stored in specially designed, high-security storage containers. Dr. Vector states that as long as the subjects stay in the Cryo-Tubes, they pose no threat. It is also stated that the Cryo-Tubes are hidden and it is unlikely that anyone is ever going to find any of them. The man states that Scum Soda is going to be huge as George in his monster form climbs the building and grabs the man. Mr. Z tells the other people with him that they have a problem.

After the monsters tear through the country, the man returns from the hospital and informs Mr. Z that the Scum Soda is a hit as nobody cares that they will transform into giant monsters. In fact, it implies that people actually want to turn into monsters. The game ends as Mr. Z and the man laugh in triumph as George rampages through the city on TV.

== Development and marketing ==
Total Destruction features two bonus games accessible instantly: the original Rampage and Rampage World Tour. While a version for Xbox was in development at one point, it was never officially announced. The Nintendo Wii version also has a clip from the Cartoon Network TV series The Grim Adventures of Billy & Mandy. In addition to the Cartoon Network clip, the Wii version features another city (Dallas), ten more monsters (three of which had appeared in previous Rampage games, those being V.E.R.N, Boris, and Ruby), and a fifth upgrade (Super Jump).

== Reception ==
Reception

Aggregate score
Aggregator	Score		
Aggregator	GameCube	PS2	Wii
Metacritic	57/100	51/100	46/100

Review scores
Publication	Score		
Publication	GameCube	PS2	Wii
1Up.com	C	C	F
Eurogamer	N/A	N/A	3/10
Game Informer	6.5/10	6.5/10	N/A
GameRevolution	D−	D−	N/A
GameSpot	5.7/10	5.7/10	5.1/10
GameSpy	2/5	2/5	3/5
GameTrailers	6.6/10	6.6/10	N/A
Hardcore Gamer	2.25/5	2.25/5	N/A
IGN	5/10	5/10	4/10
Nintendo Life	N/A	N/A	6/10
Nintendo Power	6.5/10	N/A	6.5/10
Nintendo World Report	6/10	N/A	6.5/10
Official U.S. PlayStation Magazine	N/A	2/5	N/A
X-Play	N/A	2/5	N/A
Detroit Free Press	3/4	N/A	N/A
Entertainment Weekly	C+	C+	N/A

The GameCube and PlayStation 2 versions received "mixed" reviews, while the Wii version received "unfavorable" reviews, according to the review aggregation website Metacritic. Child of Chaka of GamePro said of the PlayStation 2 version, "The core gameplay in all its monotonous glory is, unfortunately, entirely preserved, and while no one can deny the appeal of trashing pricey downtown real estate while noshing picture-snapping tourists and tossing trains, if you play one level you've played them all, if you play one monster you've played them all, and believe us: it doesn't get older much faster than this, folks." (Note: GamePro gave the PlayStation 2 version 2.5/5 for graphics, two 3/5 scores for sound and control, and 1.5/5 for fun factor.) Ouroboros later said of the Wii version, "Given that the Wii is shaping up to be one heck of a party game platform, you shouldn't have to wait long for something much, much better to come along." (Note: GamePro gave the Wii version 3.5/5 for graphics, 2.5/5 for sound, and two 2.25/5 scores for control and fun factor.)

Detroit Free Press gave the GameCube version a score of three stars out of four, saying, "It would be an improvement to allow your monster to tear through the Las Vegas strip, then head for Hoover Dam to cause some real havoc. But taking down cities one block at a time will have to suffice for now." However, The Times gave the PS2 version three stars out of five, saying that its "biggest problem" was "the lack of things to do, besides building-bashing and car-tossing." Entertainment Weekly gave the GameCube and PS2 versions a C+, saying that "After an hour or two of Total Destruction button-mashing, you’ll be ready to move on to Q*bert." The Sydney Morning Herald gave the PS2 version one star out of five, saying, "Those with a sadistic streak will enjoy hurling cars, gobbling victims and belching. But players will quickly tire of the repetitive button bashing required to raze buildings and swat hapless enemies." GameZone gave the Wii version 5.9 out of 10, saying, "In concept it is a great game, but the execution and half baked controls really ruin this game that would have been on gamers [sic] must have list."

Despite the less than positive reaction, according to Midway, the game sold over one million units; further, the GameCube version earned Player's Choice status.
