= Rampage 2: Universal Tour =

1999 video game

- North American Nintendo 64 box art
- Developers: Avalanche Software (PS1/N64); Digital Eclipse Software (GBC)
- Publisher: Midway
- Composer: Aubrey Hodges
- Series: Rampage
- Platforms: PlayStation, Nintendo 64, Game Boy Color
- Release: PlayStation: NA: March 31, 1999; EU: 1999; Nintendo 64: NA: March 31, 1999; EU: May 21, 1999; Game Boy Color: NA: November 19, 1999; EU: 1999
- Genre: Action
- Modes: Single-player, multiplayer

Rampage 2: Universal Tour is a 1999 action game developed by Avalanche Software and published by Midway. It is the third game in the Rampage series and a sequel to 1997's Rampage World Tour.

== Plot ==
George, Lizzie, and Ralph, who are returned to normal size following the events of World Tour, have been captured and confined for the world to see. George is held captive in New York City, Lizzie is imprisoned in Tokyo, and Ralph the Wolf is stored in London (references to King Kong, Godzilla, and Werewolf of London, or possibly An American Werewolf in London). However, Scumlabs, who has just rebuilt their facilities in Salt Lake City, causes another accident that results in three new monsters: Boris (a rhinoceros monster), Curtis (a mouse monster), and Ruby (a lobster monster). Players choose one of the three original monsters to rescue. The player then uses the characters in the part of the world where the rescuee is held. They work as a collective to break buildings, eat people, and destroy cars and this creates competition among players. When a player frees George, Lizzie, or Ralph, then they become playable characters. Once all the monsters are rescued, aliens begin to invade Earth in an attempt to conquer it, leaving the monsters the only ones who can save the planet that they just helped partially destroy. After fending off the invasion on Earth, the monsters rescue Myukus (a green cyclops-like alien) from Area 51, who joins them before chasing the aliens through space, destroying the aliens' bases throughout the Solar System and eventually rampaging through their home-world and destroying their capital.

A news channel covers all the destruction caused by the monsters. At the end of the game, it is revealed that the aliens have a news program of their own, but the alien anchorman who runs the program is eaten by Myukus.

== Gameplay ==
Each level in Rampage 2: Universal Tour consists of buildings which the player is able to destroy. When the player has dealt enough damage to a building, it will collapse in on itself. Sometimes, miscellaneous objects and power-ups are revealed in the buildings upon being damaged, and can assist the player if used. When every building in a city has been destroyed, the game will advance to the next level. Around every five or so levels, a mini-game is available for the player to play, and doing so can award the player with extra lives, health, and/or special powers.

Some of the cities that are featured in each level include landmarks from their real-world counterparts. For example, London features the Tower of London and Big Ben, both of which can be destroyed. In Washington, DC, the White House and the US Capitol can be destroyed; in New York City, New York, the Chrysler Building, Empire State Building, and the World Trade Center can be destroyed as well (the game having been released before the 9/11 attacks in 2001); and in Chicago, Illinois, the Sears Tower (now known as the Willis Tower), can be destroyed as well. Many of the fictional alien planets are named after real-life Earth cities.

The PlayStation version of the game differs from the Nintendo 64 one as the former features full-motion video cutscenes and different music for the Asian and European levels, whereas the latter version does not feature cutscenes and re-uses the music used for the North American levels for the European and Asian ones.

== Reception ==
Reception

Aggregate score
Aggregator	Score		
Aggregator	GBC	N64	PS
GameRankings	64%	57%	44%

Review scores
Publication	Score		
Publication	GBC	N64	PS
AllGame	3.5/5	N/A	1.5/5
Electronic Gaming Monthly	N/A	4.12/10	4.12/10
Game Informer	N/A	5/10	5.5/10
GamePro	N/A	N/A	2.5/5
GameRevolution	N/A	D	D
GameSpot	N/A	4.2/10	4/10
IGN	6/10	5.3/10	5.2/10
Nintendo Power	6.4/10	7.4/10	N/A
Official U.S. PlayStation Magazine	N/A	N/A	1/5
PlayStation: The Official Magazine	N/A	N/A	2/5

The Game Boy Color and Nintendo 64 versions received "mixed" reviews, while the PlayStation version received "unfavorable" reviews, according to the review aggregation website GameRankings.

Craig Harris of IGN criticized the PlayStation version as being "dull" and "repetitive", although stating that it was better than its predecessor, Rampage World Tour.
