= NHL Hitz =

NHL Hitz is a series of ice hockey video games published by Midway Games:

- NHL Hitz 2002 (2001)
- NHL Hitz 2003 (2002)
- NHL Hitz Pro (2003)
