= Hit the Ice =

1990 video game

- Arcade flyer
- Developer: Taito
- Publishers: JP: Taito; NA: Williams Electronics
- Composer: Hiroshige Tonomura
- Platforms: Arcade, SNES, Mega Drive/Genesis, Game Boy, PC Engine/TurboGrafx-16
- Release: December 1990
- Genre: Sports
- Modes: Single-player, multiplayer
- Arcade system: Taito B System

Hit the Ice is a 1990 ice hockey video game developed and published by Taito for arcades. It was released by Williams in North America. The game is a cartoonish representation of the sport with three players on each team: forward, defense, and goalie. There are few rules, as players are encouraged to trip, elbow and kick opponents.

Taito released ports of Hit the Ice for the PC Engine/TurboGrafx-16, Mega Drive/Genesis, Game Boy and Super NES. An NES version was developed but not released.

== Gameplay ==
Arcade screenshot

Hit the Ice is based on the game of ice hockey, the aim of the game being to outscore one's opponent by shooting the puck into the opponent's net more often than the opponent over three periods of play.

The game is unique because instead of having six players per team, the game only has three (forward, defense, and goalie). In the arcade version there are only two teams (Red and Blue) and players can be chosen for each position.

During games, there are very few rules. Players have special moves, most of which are illegal moves in actual ice hockey (such as slashing, tripping, elbowing, or kicking opponents in the groin). Fights are common, though a player losing a fight is not penalized. Instead, he becomes sluggish for a short period. If the player loses several fights in one period, he leaves the game with an injury.

Every player is capable of a "super shot", which must be charged beforehand. If allowed to charge and shoot, the shot will hit the goaltender with such force that he is knocked back into the net along with the puck, counting as a goal. If a team is far enough behind, his team may receive a power-up in the form of a "super drink", making the stick of the player who consumes it flash with energy and turning every shot into a super shot for a short time.

=== Players ===
- Iven Yakashev, spoof of a Soviet player from 1972
- Phil Bunger, spoof of Phil Esposito
- "Dicky" Fontaine, spoof of Dickie Moore
- Al Gigliano
- Johnny Novak
- "Happy" Golecki ("happy-go-lucky")
- Pierre Bourdoir
- Ben Dover
- "Gunner" Hall, spoof of Glenn Hall
- "Battleship" Boyd
- Reggie Marsh
- "Bo" Cleveland

== Reception ==
The arcade game was a hit in the United States, where weekly coin drop earnings averaged $192.25 per arcade unit during November and December 1990.

In the United Kingdom, Hit the Ice was the top-selling PC Engine game in October 1991.

== See also ==
- 2 on 2 Open Ice Challenge
