= NFL Blitz 2002 =

2001 video game

NFL Blitz 20-02
- Game Boy Advance cover art featuring Oakland Raiders cornerback Charles Woodson
- Developers: OutLook Entertainment (GBA); Midway Games (PS2); Point of View (NGC, Xbox)
- Publisher: Midway
- Producers: Matt Booty; Mark Flitman; Mark Meyers; John Vignocchi; David Brooks (GBA); Kevin Mitchell (GBA)
- Designers: Mark Turmell; Sal DiVita
- Programmer: Brad Waterman (GBA)
- Artists: Jennifer Hedrick; Patrick Griffith (GBA)
- Composers: Dan Forden; Chris Kelly (GBA)
- Series: NFL Blitz
- Platforms: Game Boy Advance, GameCube, PlayStation 2, Xbox
- Release: Game Boy Advance: NA: September 11, 2001; PlayStation 2: NA: February 7, 2002; GameCube, Xbox: NA: March 18, 2002
- Genre: Sports
- Modes: Single player, multiplayer

NFL Blitz 2002 is a video game published by Midway for Game Boy Advance in 2001, and for GameCube, PlayStation 2 and Xbox in 2002.

== Reception ==
Reception

Aggregate score
Aggregator	Score			
Aggregator	GBA	GameCube	PS2	Xbox
Metacritic	37/100	77/100	76/100	77/100

Review scores
Publication	Score			
Publication	GBA	GameCube	PS2	Xbox
AllGame	1.5/5	2.5/5	2.5/5	2.5/5
Electronic Gaming Monthly	N/A	N/A	8/10	7.5/10
Game Informer	5/10	N/A	5/10	5/10
GamePro	N/A	N/A	3.5/5	3.5/5
GameRevolution	N/A	N/A	B	N/A
GameSpot	2.6/10	8/10	8.5/10	8.5/10
GameSpy	25%	N/A	84%	83%
GameZone	8/10	9.2/10	7.9/10	9/10
IGN	2.5/10	7.9/10	8/10	8/10
Nintendo Power	2.5/5	3.8/5	N/A	N/A
Official U.S. PlayStation Magazine	N/A	N/A	4/5	N/A
Official Xbox Magazine (US)	N/A	N/A	N/A	7/10

The game received "generally favorable reviews" on all platforms except the Game Boy Advance version, which received "unfavorable" reviews, according to the review aggregation website Metacritic.
