= Trog (video game) =

1990 video game

- North American arcade flyer
- Developer: Bally Midway
- Publishers: NA: Bally Midway; EU: Williams Electronics
- Designer: George N. Petro
- Programmer: Kurt Mahan
- Artist: Jack E. Haeger
- Composer: Chris Granner
- Platforms: Arcade, MS-DOS, NES
- Release: NA: March 1990; EU: February 1991
- Genre: Maze
- Modes: Single-player, multiplayer
- Arcade system: Midway Y Unit

Trog is a maze arcade video game developed and published by Midway Manufacturing in 1990 in North America under the "Bally/Midway" label and later by Williams Electronics in Europe. In the game, players control one of four dinosaurs chased by the titular cavemen. Its gameplay includes elements of Pac-Man—collect all items in a maze, eat a special item to turn the tables on pursuers—but supports up to four players at once. Initially envisioned as a hybrid puzzle/strategy game, its original concept was later reworked into a Pac-Man-like title after bad reception from testers and features claymation graphics, advertised as "Playmation" by Midway. Conversions for the Nintendo Entertainment System and MS-DOS were released by Acclaim Entertainment in 1990 and 1991 respectively, reducing the number of simultaneous players to two. Both the arcade and NES versions garnered positive reception from critics.

== Gameplay ==
The player's dinosaur in the center, surrounded by 5 Trogs.

Trog is a maze game reminiscent of Pac-Man where players assume the role of Theropod-like dinosaurs (with Styracosaurus-like heads) Rex, Bloop, Spike, and/or Gwen, through 49 islands set in the land of "Og", home to the one-eyed cavemen known as the "Trog". Players must pick up all colored eggs lying around the map as the titular cavemen wander around, attempting to eat them.

Unlike what's in Pac-Man, the dinosaurs can attack at any time with a punch that does not require a power-up. The power-ups randomly spawn to help finish the level; these include red flowers that increase the player's speed; ice cubes that freeze all on-screen Trogs; pineapples, which turn the character into a full-grown T-Rex and temporarily eat Trogs (similar to Pac-Man's Power pellets, except the power-up occurs randomly); and a firebrand which bestows a temporary fire breathing ability on the dinos.

The multiplayer mode consists of two to four dinos on the same screen competing to get all of his/her same-colored eggs first, and players can either attack or protect each other (though power-ups indiscriminately hurt anyone that is in the way regardless). Many stages feature no walls, so characters can travel off the edge of the grid-like islands and plunge into the sea if they are not careful. The Trogs themselves are subject to all hazards the player is; they can even be taken out by their own wheels, fire and pits to comic effect. Trogs can be one-hit punched, to the side of the head, as they approach the screen edge resulting in them falling into the sea, with bonus points rewarded to the player.

There are three levels of difficulty: Easy, Advanced and Expert (although the arcade operator can set the difficulty in the operator menu to make the game more difficult on easier levels, without the player's knowledge of the true global difficulty). Advanced Mode rewards a 200,000 level bonus and Expert rewards a 400,000 level bonus. As the levels progress, the cavemen become smarter and invent new ways to capture the dinosaurs. They eventually create fire pits and wheels to burn and flatten, respectively, the character and springs to bounce themselves all over the screen. Catapults and transportation chambers in latter stages help evade these attacks, however these are also usable by the Trogs resulting in some tactical gameplay options.

== Development ==
Revision 4.00 version screenshot

Trog was co-designed by George N. Petro and Jack E. Haeger, who worked on previous Midway releases such as NARC. Jack Haeger also created the artwork and "Playmation" graphics, in which character models were created with clay animation. George Petro and Kurt Mahan worked as programmers, with composer Chris Granner scoring the soundtrack and created the sound effects. Other members also collaborated in the project. The original concept, dubbed "Revision 4.00", was more of a puzzle/strategy game consisting of players controlling a hand which would lay bones to guide their corresponding dinosaur in the right path. However, this idea was heavily panned and ridiculed during testing, with one tester allegedly defacing one of the cabinets to add an "R" to the label of the bone button. Due to poor reception, Midway considered canceling the project altogether but was given a second chance for two reasons: The first one was because Haeger had already spent so much of the budget on the clay animation and the second reason was because one of the testers suggested turning it into a Pac-Man clone.

== Release ==
Trog was first released in arcades by Midway in North America in March 1990 and later in Europe by Williams in February 1991. In 1990, a faithful conversion of the game by Software Creations was released for DOS computers. However, the DOS version only supports two players instead of four, featuring Bloop and Rex as playable characters. In October 1991, the title was then ported to the Nintendo Entertainment System by Visual Concepts and first published by Acclaim in North America and later in Europe. The NES version has a number of key differences such as visuals and sound, two-player support with Bloop and Spike as playable characters instead of four, among other changes.

== Reception ==
Reception

Review scores
Publication	Score
Nintendo Power	(NES) 2.8/5.0
Aktueller Software Markt	(NES) 8/12
Consoles +	(NES) 70%
Hobby Consolas	(NES) 93/100
Mean Machines	(NES) 74%
N-Force	(NES) 88%
Play Time	(NES) 62%
Total!	(NES) 67%
Video Games	(NES) 71%

Mark Caswell of Zzap!64 gave the original arcade version of Trog an overall positive outlook. The Nintendo Entertainment System conversion was met with positive reception from critics.

== Legacy ==
Trog's arcade cabinet makes a brief appearance in the 1991 film Terminator 2: Judgment Day. Characters from the game make appearances in later Midway titles. In Revolution X, one of the Trogs appears as a shootable "easter egg". In CarnEvil, a Trog can be found in the "Freak Show" portion of the game as an attraction on the background frozen in a block of ice labeled "Frozen In Time!", while the dinosaur characters also appear as enemies in the "Rickety Town" level. Said game was also conceptualised and directed by Haeger.
