= Pigskin (video game) =

1979 video game

- Developers: J. Laurence; R. Sothen; W. Gavenda
- Publisher: Acorn Software Products
- Platform: TRS-80
- Release: 1979
- Genre: Sports game
- Modes: Single-player, multiplayer

Pigskin is a 1979 video game by Acorn Software Products for the TRS-80 Model I Level II.

== Plot summary ==
Pigskin is a football game with ten offensive plays and six defensive plays, and a player can either play against the computer opponent or another human opponent. In single-player mode there are five levels of difficulty.

== Reception ==
J. Mishcon reviewed Pigskin in The Space Gamer No. 30. Mishcon commented that "A super game for kids who will love plenty of scoring but probably not the answer for a real lover of football."
