= Strike Force (video game) =

1991 video game

- Title screen
- Developer: Midway
- Publisher: Midway
- Programmers: Todd Allen; Eric Pribyl
- Artists: John Vogel; Jim Gentile
- Composers: Chris Granner; Rich Karstens
- Platform: Arcade
- Release: NA: March 1991
- Genre: Scrolling shooter
- Modes: Single-player, multiplayer
- Arcade system: Midway Y Unit hardware

Strike Force is a 1991 horizontally scrolling shooter developed and published by Midway as an arcade video game. In the same way that 1990's Smash TV is a modernized reimagining of 1982's Robotron: 2084 with two-player simultaneous play, Strike Force is a modernized reimagining of 1981's Defender with two-player simultaneous play. Strike Force was not widely distributed and was not ported to any home systems.

== Gameplay ==
The game shares many features with the earlier Defender and Stargate in that play takes place in a horizontally scrolling play field above a planet's surface on which humans are under attack from alien invaders. In all three games the player gains points and other advantages from protecting and rescuing humans from these attacks.

Strike Force adds several new features; two players may share the screen at one time, and either player may press the start button to change into a "turret" that moves very slowly, but has greater firepower. If one player becomes a turret and the other remains a fighter, the turret will automatically attach to the fighter, and the turret player can shoot in any direction without altering the fighter's motion.

Players begin from a 2D view of planets, and can move around to choose which planet to save from alien attack. When a planet is cleared, the players are returned to the system view again.

There are 50 planets in the game to clear, and the surface of each planet is littered with various special weapons that can be picked up and deployed. There are also many aliens to kill and humans to save on each planet. Large aliens can capture and "mutate" humans on the planet into small green creatures (mutants) that will fight against the player (although the player may still pick them up for points as with the normal humans). The mutants may also use vehicles found on the planet's surface against the player.

In the system view mode, randomly, an enemy ship will drop down to a planet, which then starts flashing. If the player does not move to that planet in time, the planet is destroyed. Once on a planet under such attack, the player must destroy the ship, which is like a "mini-boss". There is also a weapons satellite in system view, where the player can purchase weapons similar to those collected randomly from planet surfaces.

After a certain number of planets are cleared, the player may attack the enemy base, in an attempt to destroy it and the end boss within. Destroying the base ends the game.

If the player succeeds in destroying the enemy base, and manages to clear and save all 50 planets, the game gives one free credit to each player as a reward. Using that free credit and clearing all 50 planets again repeats this, ad infinitum.

== Reception ==
British gaming magazine The One reviewed Strike Force in 1991, heavily comparing it to Defender, stating "why not produce an updated Defender? You might as well say why not produce an updated Mona Lisa? Midway's tried - and it looks like painting-by-numbers. If you ever loved the original, don't torture yourself by playing this."
