= Kozmik Krooz'r =

1982 video game

- Flyer showing the cabinet and mothership toy
- Developer: Bally Midway
- Publisher: Bally Midway
- Programmer: Rich Clark
- Artist: Brian Colin
- Platform: Arcade
- Release: 1982
- Genre: Shoot 'em up
- Arcade system: Midway MCR II

Kozmik Krooz'r is a shoot 'em up video game developed by Bally Midway and released in arcades in 1982. The spaceship, a core element of the gameplay, is not an in-game graphic, but a physical plastic model. A series of mirrors projects the mothership just above the game's monitor.

== Gameplay ==
Players guide Kapt. Krooz'r to a rotating mothership at the top of the playfield, one which can only be entered when its tractor beam is operational. Players can also shoot enemies in one of eight directions and deflect firepower during their journey. Every fifth round there is a bonus round where Kapt. Krooz'r must pick up space junk.

== Development ==
The game was originally known as Kapt. Krooz'r.

== Legacy ==
The character Kapt. Krooz'r is also in the 1983 arcade game Wacko.

Kozmik Krooz'r is included in the 2004 release of Midway Arcade Treasures 2. The mothership is represented by 3D polygons.
