= Rampage Through Time =

2000 video game

- European box art
- Developers: Avalanche Software; Eggington Productions
- Publisher: Midway Games
- Series: Rampage
- Platform: PlayStation
- Release: NA: June 20, 2000; EU: September 29, 2000
- Genre: Action
- Modes: Single-player, multiplayer

Rampage Through Time is a 2000 action game developed by Avalanche Software and published by Midway Games for the PlayStation. It is the fourth game in the Rampage series, and a sequel to 1999's Rampage 2: Universal Tour. In the game, seven previous Scumlabs monsters and one new one use a time machine to rampage through time.

== Gameplay ==
In Campaign Mode, each time zone consists of four stages. The first three consist of traditional Rampage gameplay, in that the player must destroy all the buildings in each city while avoiding attacks from enemy forces. Campaign Mode is only playable with one player, but the CPU will randomly select two other monsters to oppose the player in that time zone. After each city is destroyed, all three monsters are awarded stars for inflicting the most damage on buildings, people, and each other.

The fourth stage is a multiplayer minigame that varies with each time zone, usually as a parody of games such as Asteroids or Breakout. In Campaign Mode, the player must win these minigames in order to continue with the main game. The stars earned in the Rampage stages are also translated into extra points for the minigames, making it important to earn as many as possible to increase the chances of winning.

== Plot ==
The world is yet again rebuilding after the events of Universal Tour. To speed up the cleaning process, Scumlabs creates a time machine to send employees back in time to deal with the destruction without having to do so in the present. Unfortunately, the monsters from the previous games (George the ape, Lizzie the dinosaur, Ralph the wolfman, Boris the rhino, Curtis the rat and Ruby the lobster), have somehow returned to Earth, this time joined by a new monster: Harley the warthog. They surprise Scumlabs and enter the time machine, and begin terrorizing the past, present, and future, bringing mayhem to the space-time continuum. Later, a UFO-like craft is created to stop the monsters, only to fail. In the end, the news anchorman declares that all efforts to stop the monsters have all ended in failure and ends the broadcast.

== Reception ==
Reception

Aggregate score
Aggregator	Score
GameRankings	49%

Review scores
Publication	Score
AllGame	2.5/5
Game Informer	4.75/10
GameFan	75%
GameSpot	4/10
IGN	3.5/10
Official U.S. PlayStation Magazine	1.5/5

The game received "unfavorable" reviews according to the review aggregation website GameRankings.
