= Pigskin 621 A.D. =

1990 video game

- Arcade flyer featuring one of the playable characters, Odin Innaway
- Developer: Bally Midway
- Publishers: Bally Midway; Genesis; RazorSoft
- Programmer: Jeff Nauman
- Artist: Brian Colin
- Composer: Dan Forden
- Platforms: Arcade, Sega Genesis
- Release: Arcade: NA: July 1990; Genesis: NA: December 18, 1992
- Genre: Sports
- Modes: Single-player, multiplayer
- Arcade system: MCR-68k hardware

Pigskin 621 A.D. is an arcade game released in 1990 by Midway Manufacturing under the "Bally Midway" label. One player can battle the computer, or two players can battle head-to-head. Two teams compete to score as many touchdowns as possible in the tradition of American football, but actual play is more similar to rugby football.

A version for the Sega Genesis, retitled Jerry Glanville's Pigskin Footbrawl and endorsed by coach Jerry Glanville, was released by RazorSoft on December 18, 1992.

== Gameplay ==
Players control one of the team members, navigating the hazards on the field and dispatching opponents using weapons. The current team strategy is displayed near the top of the screen, along with the score.

The player directly controls one member of a five-man team, with the object of carrying a football over the opposing team's goal line. The playing area is littered with hazards such as pits, bushes and logs. A ball carrier who trips over any of these, or who is punched by an opponent, fumbles the ball. The field is also laden with weapons: axes, maces, nooses, scythes, spears, swords and torches. A player can pick up one of these by running over it. It will appear at the top of the screen next to the player's score as a "concealed weapon", several weapons may be carried at once and one may be carried over after a touchdown. The ball carrier can be "grappled", essentially a mass tackle into which multiple characters can jump. Having a concealed weapon as well as having more characters jump into the grapple greatly increases a team's chance of gaining or retaining possession, although weapons cannot be used if both team captains are in the grapple. A character who is injured by a concealed weapon is out of play until a touchdown is scored.

If one team gets too far behind in score in the second half of the game, a computer-controlled troll is added to the losing side to help even the odds, and behaves more aggressively than regular players. Additionally, the troll cannot be killed by weapons. Up to two trolls can be in play at a time during a standard game (one per side or two on one side). During a one player "Pro Pigskin" game, if the computer-controlled team continues to lose heavily even after a troll has been added or falls behind very quickly early on, an option for a "Troll Bowl" will appear. If selected the player will face an entire team of trolls with only human players on their own side.

Gameplay tips are given between periods and statistics are given at the end of the game. Statistics cover Goals Scored, Injuries Inflicted and Pigskin Possession Time. Before the game we can read about teams background. Both teams are renegades bands. The blue band is led by Thor Akenbak, and the red one's captain is Atilla DeSoil.

=== Scoring ===
A touchdown is worth six points, with a one-point bonus for keeping possession of the ball for longer than a minimum time (approximately 10 seconds).

It is possible to gain very high scores by eliminating most of the opposing team and then maintaining possession of the ball for as long as possible. Since a period can only end on a change of possession, a player can keep gaining single possession points well after the period clock has run out.

=== Controls ===
Pigskin has two pass buttons (short and long), a punch button, and a button for selecting the team's strategy ("Block", "Scatter" and "Bad Attitude" when the player's team is in possession of the ball; "Get Ball", "Man-to-Man" and "Bad Attitude" when the opponent has it). By pressing buttons for a punch and a pass simultaneously, the player jumps at enemy.

== Sega Genesis version ==
There is no scythe and torch. The music is shorter and plays at a lower volume. The game features soundbites from Atlanta Falcons coach Jerry Glanville. There is a hidden sound test.

== Offers ==
At one time, the makers of Pigskin 621 A.D. offered tickets to the Super Bowl as part of a sweepstakes promotion associated with the arcade game. The game also advertised a free players handbook available by sending a self-addressed stamped envelope to a specified post-office box.

== Development ==
Designers Jeff Nauman and Brian Colin had previously worked on the Midway Games Arch Rivals and Rampage, which are referenced in the game's tagline "Ancient Archrivals on a Rampage".

Pigskin is the last of only seven games made for Midway's MCR-68k system before completely switching over to newer TMS34010 based systems.
