= Rampage (video game) =

1986 video game

- North American arcade flyer
- Developer: Bally Midway
- Publisher: Bally Midway: Home computers, 2600, 7800 Activision NES Data East Lynx Atari Corporation
- Designers: Brian Colin; Jeff Nauman
- Programmer: Jeff Nauman
- Artists: Brian Colin; Sharon Perry
- Composer: Michael Bartlow
- Series: Rampage
- Platform: Arcade: ZX Spectrum, Atari 8-bit, Atari ST, Commodore 64, IBM PC, Apple II, NES, Amstrad CPC, Master System, Amiga, Atari 2600, Atari 7800, TRS-80 Color Computer, Atari Lynx
- Release: August 1986: Arcade; NA/JP: August 1986 ZX Spectrum; UK: November 1987 Atari 8-bit; EU: 1987 Atari ST; NA: 1987; EU: 1987 C64; EU: 1987; NA: December 1988 IBM PC; NA: April 1988 Apple II; NA: November 1988 NES; NA: December 1988 CPC; EU: 1988 Master System; NA: January 1989; PAL: June 1989 Amiga; NA: April 1989; EU: 1989 2600; May 1989 7800; November 1989 TRS-80; NA: 1989 Lynx; JP: December 20, 1990; NA: 1992
- Genre: Action
- Modes: Single-player, multiplayer
- Arcade system: Midway MCR-III

Rampage is a 1986 action video game developed and published by Bally Midway for arcades. Inspired by monster films, players control a trio of monsters: George, Lizzie, and Ralph, humans transformed into creatures due to various experimental mishaps. The goal is to destroy cities and combat military forces while staying alive. The game is set across 128 days in cities throughout North America, with each cycle repeating five times. Gameplay includes destroying buildings, eating humans, and avoiding damage.

Rampage spawned ports to various home consoles and computers, as well as five sequels and a 2018 film adaptation. Warner Bros. owns all rights to the property via their purchase of Midway Games.

== Gameplay ==
From left to right are the protagonists: George, Lizzie and Ralph.

Up to three players control a trio of humans transformed into giant animalistic monsters due to various experiment-related accidents: George, a scientist who transformed into a King Kong-like gorilla due to the influence of experimental vitamins; Lizzie, a woman who transformed into a Godzilla-like reptile after swimming in a lake contaminated with radioactive waste; and Ralph, who transformed into a gigantic werewolf after unwittingly eating a hot dog with an unknown food additive. The trio must raze all buildings in a high-rise city to advance to the next level, eating people and destroying helicopters, tanks, taxis, police cars, boats and trolleys along the way.

The player can climb any of the buildings, punching them to pieces and reducing them to rubble. Non-playable human characters within levels can also be punched or grabbed and food items can be eaten. The player's monster receives damage from enemy bullets, shells, sticks of dynamite, punches from other monsters, lightning, and falling. Health is recovered by eating food items such as fruit, roast chicken, or soldiers. If a monster takes too much damage, they will revert to their former human state and walk off the screen. In this state, players can be eaten by another monster. If the player continues, the person returns to their monster form or (if the person has walked off the screen) flies in on a blimp (but has lost their previous score) with a full life bar.

Smashing open windows generally reveals an item or person of interest, which may be helpful or harmful. Helpful items include food or money, while dangerous ones include bombs, electrical appliances, and cigarettes. Some items can be both. For example, a toaster is dangerous until the toast appears, and a photographer must be eaten quickly before he blinds the player's monster with his flash, causing it to fall. When a civilian is present waving their hands out of a window signaling for help, the player's points rapidly increase after the person is grabbed.

Rampage is set over the course of 128 days in cities across North America. The game starts in Peoria, Illinois and ends in Plano, Illinois. In Plano, players receive a "mega vitamin bonus" which heals all the monsters and provides a large point bonus. After this, the cycle of cities repeats five times. After 768 days, the game resets back to Day 1. Game developer Brian F Colin stated "the hardware couldn't support that much art and we never figured anyone would get through 768 levels".

Some of the home port versions of the game start in San Jose, California and end in Los Angeles, California after going all around North America. The rampage travels through various cities across the United States, as well as two Canadian cities. Out of the 50 US states, only Connecticut, Delaware, Mississippi, New Hampshire, Rhode Island, South Carolina, and Vermont are spared from the monster rampage.

== Development ==
The game's lead designers were artist Brian Colin and programmer Jeff Nauman. Neither of them being fans of arcade games at the time, Colin conceived Rampage as a game in which there was "no wrong way to play". To this end, he wanted to eschew the common video game concepts of having a set objective, competing for a high score and dying. Artist Sharon Perry, game tester Jim Belt and composer Michael Bartlow assisted with developing the game. The game's aim of destroying skyscrapers was created because the developers could only move rectangular shapes in the background. The developers had to work within the technical limitations of the time - cities are largely identical in appearance, Ralph and George are the same character palette and head swapped and the dust effect from crumbling buildings conceals glitchy animation. The development and release languished as management was unconvinced of the game's unusual concept of casting players as city-destroying monsters, but picked up after new management was installed at the company. Post-release, additional levels were added to make the game more difficult. In the opening cutscene reporting on three humans who mutated into the monsters, Colin put pictures of himself as George, his wife Rae as Lizzie, and Nauman as Ralph.

Conceiving a graphically impressive title within the technical constraints of Midway's then current arcade hardware, designer Brian Colin took inspiration from monster films King Kong and 20 Million Miles To Earth. Decades after the game released, Colin addressed a popular misconception that Lizzie was based on Godzilla, stating Lizzie was actually based on the Ymir from 20 Million Miles to Earth. He said Godzilla would have been too large to fit into the size constraints of the game, and that he preferred Ray Harryhausen and Willis O’Brien films over kaiju films such as Godzilla.

== Release and ports ==
The game was released for the arcades in 1986. Colin promoted the game via a press release sent to local media outlets in each of the towns mentioned in-game. The press release took the form of an unofficial memo from Bally/Midway that said their town was "slated for destruction".

Rampage was ported to the Apple II, Atari 2600, Atari 7800, Atari Lynx, Atari 8-bit computers, Atari ST, Amiga, Commodore 64, MS-DOS, ZX Spectrum, Amstrad CPC, Nintendo Entertainment System, Master System, and Tandy Color Computer 3. The Lynx version includes a fourth character: Larry, a giant rat. The NES version excludes Ralph, reducing the number of monsters to two.

The Lynx version was developed by Epyx and originally started off as an unrelated clone called Monster Demolition, before turning into a port of this game.

The arcade version of Rampage is included in various compilations. In 1999, it was included in Arcade Party Pak for the PlayStation. In 2003, it was included in Midway Arcade Treasures, a compilation of arcade games for the GameCube, PlayStation 2, and Xbox. In 2005, it was included in Midway Arcade Treasures: Extended Play for the PlayStation Portable. In 2006, it was a bonus feature in Rampage: Total Destruction. In 2012, it was included in the compilation Midway Arcade Origins.

In 1997, Tiger Electronics released a handheld LCD version of the game. In 2017, Basic Fun released a mini arcade port of the NES version of the game with Ralph added. This was #10 of their Arcade Classics line.

Rampage is an unlockable in the 2015 game Lego Dimensions.

In July 2000, Midway licensed Rampage, along with other Williams Electronics games, to Shockwave for use in an online applet to demonstrate the power of the shockwave web content platform, entitled Shockwave Arcade Collection. The conversion was created by Digital Eclipse. Rampage was also ported to iOS as part of the Midway arcade app.

In 2018, Arcade1Up released a mini 4-foot version of the original arcade cabinet.

== Reception ==
Reception

Review scores
Publication	Score				
Publication	Arcade	Atari 2600	Atari Lynx	Master System	ZX
Crash	7/10				
Computer and Video Games		87%	60%	85%	
Famitsu			6/10, 8/10, 7/10, 6/10		
IGN			9/10		
Raze			81%		
Sinclair User					6/10
Your Sinclair					6/10
Console XS				85%	

The game was a financial success in arcades, and one of the last successful titles for Bally/Midway.

Computer Gaming World approved of the MS-DOS adaptation of Rampage, especially for those with computers faster than the original IBM PC and an EGA video card. It stated that "Rampage is proof that IBM games can compete with other machines in running entertainment software".

Your Sinclair said it was "all great fun for a while but being a monster can become a drag. So unless you intend to play it three-handed, when the fun factor increases a little, or you're a monster fan of the original, you might just give this a miss for something with more lasting value".

=== Lynx ===
CVG Magazine reviewed the Lynx version of the game in their March 1991 issue, giving it a score of 60%. Robert A. Jung reviewed the game which was posted to IGN Entertainment in July 1999. In his final verdict, he wrote "a lighthearted, silly game that's lots of fun for lots of players (the more the merrier)", giving a score of 9 out of 10.

== Legacy ==
In 1997, Rampage World Tour was released, developed for Midway by the original designers, Brian Colin and Jeff Nauman. It was followed by the console-exclusive games Rampage 2: Universal Tour, Rampage Through Time, and Rampage Puzzle Attack. The last game in the series made by Midway was Rampage: Total Destruction.

A 2018 arcade reboot was made by Adrenaline Amusements for Warner Bros., based on the 2018 Rampage film. Initially released exclusively for Dave & Buster's, it includes redemption game mechanics.

=== Film adaptation ===
A theatrical film adaptation loosely based on the game was developed by Warner Bros and New Line Cinema, directed by Brad Peyton and starring Dwayne Johnson with John Rickard and Beau Flynn as producers. The film features the classic trio of George, Lizzie and Ralph, this time as mutated animals rather than transformed humans. The film was released on April 13, 2018.
