= Sarge (video game) =

1985 video game

- Flyer
- Developer(s): Bally Midway
- Publisher(s): Bally Midway
- Platform(s): Arcade
- Release: NA: 1985
- Genre(s): Multidirectional shooter
- Mode(s): Single-player, multiplayer

Screenshot

Sarge is a multidirectional shooter arcade video game released by Bally Midway in 1985. Two players play at once, switching between tanks and helicopters. Players can fight each other. The game has two sets of joysticks.
