= Blasted (video game) =

1988 video game

- Developer(s): Bally Midway
- Publisher(s): Bally Midway
- Designer(s): Brian Colin; Jeff Nauman
- Platform(s): Arcade
- Release: NA: June 1988
- Genre(s): Shoot 'em up
- Mode(s): Single-player, multiplayer

Blasted is a 1988 shoot 'em up video game developed and published by Bally Midway for arcades.

== Gameplay ==
Players use the high-powered scope-rifle to shoot cyborgs who have invaded an apartment complex, but must not shoot the tenants or get hit by return fire. In 2-player mode, one player shoot at their opponent's building and returns fire.

== Development ==
Originally, this game was a four-player shooter known as International Team Laser, an attempt to capitalize on the laser tag craze of the late 1980s. However, the game was canned, and its gameplay elements were re-themed to create Blasted, which included reducing the number of players from four to two.
