= Arch Rivals =

1989 video game

- North American NES box art
- Developer: Bally Midway (Note: NES version developed by Rare; Genesis/Mega Drive and Game Gear versions developed by Arc Developments.)
- Publishers: Bally Midway; Ports; Acclaim Entertainment (Note: Released under the Flying Edge brand name on Sega systems.)
- Designers: Jeff Nauman; Brian Colin
- Programmer: Jeff Nauman
- Artist: Brian Colin
- Composer: Dan Forden: NES David Wise Genesis/Mega Drive, Game Gear Mark Cooksey
- Platforms: Arcade, NES, Genesis/Mega Drive, Game Gear
- Release: May 1989: Arcade; NA: May 1989 NES; NA: November 1990; PAL: 1991 Genesis/Mega Drive; NA: 1992; PAL: November 12, 1992 Game Gear; NA: December 1992
- Genres: Sports (basketball)
- Modes: Single-player, multiplayer

Arch Rivals is a 1989 basketball video game developed and published by Bally Midway for arcades. Billed as "A Basket Brawl", the game features two-on-two full court basketball games in which players are encouraged to punch opposing players and steal the ball from them. Arch Rivals was the second basketball video game released by Midway, sixteen years after TV Basketball (1974). Home versions of the game were released for the Nintendo Entertainment System, Genesis/Mega Drive, and Game Gear.

Arch Rivals allows players to select from a variety of fictional teams (although arcade operators can change the team names to reflect real ones) and players. One playable character, "Tyrone" was also featured in the animated The Power Team segments of the television series Video Power. In turn, the game has been considered a forerunner to Midway's popular arcade basketball game, NBA Jam. Emulated versions of Arch Rivals are included in the compilations Midway Arcade Treasures 2, Midway Arcade Treasures Deluxe Edition, and Midway Arcade Origins.

== Gameplay ==
Arcade screenshot

Games generally follow standard basketball rules; a full game consists of four quarters, with four minutes each. Each team has two players, and the objective of the game is to outscore the opponent until the final buzzer sounds. A player can call for his teammate to pass him the ball or to shoot it in this battle royale.

If the game results in a tie after four quarters, multiple sudden death overtime periods are added, in which case whoever scores the next basket will win the game. Every overtime period is one minute. If, however, no score occurs after overtime the procedure repeats.

The difference between Arch Rivals and other basketball titles is the ability to freely punch an opposing player without penalty and steal the ball away. The referee will only call shot clock violations. Also unique to the game are various on-court hazards such as soda cans and candy wrappers thrown onto the floor. If a ballhandler steps on those, he falls onto the floor allowing his opponent to steal the ball from him. Players could also fall over the referee in the same way as the objects on the floor, as well as steal the ball with a maneuver called the "flying leap" where the player would jump forwards at the opposition ball carrier. If the maneuver missed, the player would roll along the floor. If successful, the player would tackle the opposition holding the ball. In the Arcade version the "flying leap" would pull the opposition's shorts down, revealing the opponent's underwear.

There are eight playable characters, each with a unique characteristic. The teams in Arch Rivals are selected at random, with Player 1 playing as the home team and Player 2 (or the computer) as the away team. The teams in the arcade version are Chicago, Los Angeles, New York, Denver, Natural High and Brawl State.

Also, the arcade operator can customize the team names and colors through the game's "Hometown Heroes" feature.

== Ports ==
The four home ports of the game have lower-quality graphics than the arcade version, due to being released on 8 and 16-bit systems. The NES version of the game contains a glitch where a 3-point dunk can be achieved. The Sega Genesis version received poorer reception due to a glitch where almost 95% of shots taken from anywhere on the court would result in a basket. A Master System port was scheduled for release in 1992 alongside the Genesis version, but was cancelled.

It was also included on Midway Arcade Treasures 2 for the PlayStation 2, Xbox, and GameCube; Midway Arcade Treasures Deluxe Edition for Microsoft Windows; and Midway Arcade Origins for PlayStation 3 and Xbox 360.

== Reception ==
Reception

Review score
Publication	Score
Electronic Gaming Monthly	6/10, 6/10, 6/10, 8/10 (NES)

Sinclair User and Computer and Video Games published positive reviews of Arch Rivals, while commenting that the game was best suited to fans of the sport.

== See also ==
- Double Dribble (1986 video game)
- NBA Jam (1993 video game)
- Basketbrawl
- Pigskin 621 A.D.
