= NHL Hitz 2003 =

2002 video game

- North American cover art for Xbox; Pictured: Chris Pronger
- Developers: Black Box Games; Exient Entertainment (GBA)
- Publisher: Midway Sports
- Director: Paul Lefevre
- Producer: Jeremy Airey
- Composers: Chris Peterson; Dan Fung
- Series: NHL Hitz
- Platforms: GameCube; PlayStation 2; Xbox; Game Boy Advance
- Release: NA: September 16, 2002; EU: November 1, 2002; Game Boy Advance: NA: October 14, 2002
- Genre: Sports
- Mode: Multiplayer

NHL Hitz 2003 is an ice hockey video game published by Midway Sports. One version was developed by Black Box Games and released on the Xbox, PlayStation 2, GameCube in 2002. The other was developed by Exient Entertainment and released on the Game Boy Advance. It is the second game of the NHL Hitz series. The Game Boy Advance version can be linked with up to three other systems for four-player play.

== Gameplay ==
Players have the option of playing three periods in one, two, or three minutes in length. To begin the game, a center, a winger, a defenceman, and a goalie are picked for each team. Prior to each period, substituting the players or simply leaving them in the game is an option. There is an option for a mercy rule that will end the game as soon as the team reaches the limit of goal differential. As an example, if the mercy rule is set to five, as soon as a team leads the game by five goals, that team automatically wins. It can also be set to one goal, similar to overtime. Another nuance to the game is the option to make players who lose fights leave the game. The game is also meant to mainly be a hard-hitting, arcade-style game with wildly exaggerated player movements and actions. For example, players can check other players through the glass and into the stands, but won't stop play. Also, goalies can actually stick-handle the puck around, and take a shot on the other net, sometimes scoring. Also, the rosters are shortened to mainly starters and fan favorites (such as Tie Domi and Bob Probert), with far fewer free agents. There are also many mini-games to play.

=== Franchise mode ===
The tournament is to complete goals in the game to get experience points, which are like stat points. When players win more, they get better equipment, like sticks for accuracy and power, goalie pads for better rebound control, and more. They create a team with the goal of joining the NHL, and they start off picking the team, logo, etc., and then create seven players. As the player progresses, beating teams will result in the teams getting harder, but at the same time their team will improve too. When they start winning games, three more players will eventually ask to join the team, and the player can customize them. There are eight rounds with 5-6 teams in each one around the globe. In the last few rounds, the player will face NHL teams and players and be awarded with the trophy if they emerge victorious. They are faced with a worldwide quest, taking on teams internationally in places such as Brooklyn, Maui, Monte Carlo, Stockholm, and Montego Bay.

=== Season ===
A season mode is available. If the player-controlled team qualifies for them, a full playoff schedule will begin. This time, however, there are more individual awards made by the creators. There are also end-of-season awards created by the makers of the game, such as trophies for the player who wins the most fights or delivered the most hits.

== Reception ==
Reception

Aggregate score
Aggregator	Score			
Aggregator	GBA	GameCube	PS2	Xbox
Metacritic	68/100	82/100	82/100	81/100

Review scores
Publication	Score			
Publication	GBA	GameCube	PS2	Xbox
AllGame	N/A	3.5/5	3.5/5	3.5/5
EP Daily	N/A	N/A	N/A	7.5/10
Eurogamer	N/A	N/A	8/10	N/A
Game Informer	N/A	8.75/10	8.75/10	8.75/10
GameRevolution	N/A	N/A	B	N/A
GameSpot	N/A	7.8/10	7.8/10	7.8/10
GameZone	N/A	8/10	8.5/10	8.7/10
IGN	7/10	8.4/10	8.2/10	8.4/10
Nintendo Power	4/5	4.6/5	N/A	N/A
Nintendo World Report	5/10	8/10	N/A	N/A
Official U.S. PlayStation Magazine	N/A	N/A	4.5/5	N/A
Official Xbox Magazine (US)	N/A	N/A	N/A	8.8/10
X-Play	N/A	N/A	N/A	4/5

The game received "favorable" reviews on all platforms except the Game Boy Advance version, which received "average" reviews, according to the review aggregation website Metacritic. GamePro said of the game, "If you take hockey seriously, no need to apply here. But if you're looking for rowdy, raucous action backed by unusual staying power and that familiar Midway gameplay, you'll savor the smell of what Hitz is cooking." (Note: GamePro gave the game all three 4/5 scores for sound, control, and fun factor. The only difference in the graphics department was that the magazine gave the GameCube and Xbox versions 4/5, while giving the PlayStation 2 version 3.5/5.)
