= Two Tigers (video game) =

1984 video game

- Developer: Bally Midway
- Publisher: Bally Midway
- Designers: Ron Haliburton; Tim Gilbert
- Artist: R. Berrios
- Platform: Arcade
- Release: 1984
- Genre: Multidirectional shooter
- Modes: Single-player, multiplayer
- Arcade system: Midway MCR II

Two Tigers is a multidirectional shooter created by Bally Midway and released as an arcade video game in 1984. One or two players each control a World War II-era fighter plane to shoot enemy planes which fall and damage a naval ship at the bottom of the screen. After enough damage, the ship explodes. Players can also drop one bomb at a time to the same effect. An alternate dogfight mode allows two players to attempt to down each other's plane.

The game was released as both a standalone cabinet and as a conversion kit for Tron. The two have different controllers and differ in gameplay and presentation details.

== Gameplay ==
Each player steers an always moving plane by rotating it clockwise and counter-clockwise. Enemy planes fly horizontally across the screen; shooting them causes them to crash into the ocean or the large ship floating in it. Each hit from a downed plane destroys a piece of the ship where it crashes. Naval mines drifting in the water can be shot, damaging the ship from below. Players can damage the ship directly by dropping bombs. Only one bomb per player can be in the air at once.

Destroying an entire vertical column of a ship causes a leak. When enough leaks have been created (based on the level), the ship explodes. As an intermission, submarines, sharks, and swimmers occupy the open water and can be shot. After a brief respite, a new ship arrives.

Lives are unlimited in Two Tigers. Flying into another plane spawns a replacement once the wreckage falls offscreen. Player-controlled planes do not collide with the ship at the bottom. After a certain amount of time an undestroyed ship leaves; three such departures ends the game.

== Release ==
There are two variations of Two Tigers machines. The original, standalone version has a flight yoke to steer the plane. Ambient audio is provided by an 8-track tape player in the cabinet. The game was later released as a conversion kit for Midway's Tron which uses the weighted spinner to rotate the plane and does not include the 8-track player. It has significant differences in terms of gameplay, visuals, and audio compared to the original.
