= Rampage World Tour =

1997 video game

- Arcade flyer
- Developer: Game Refuge (Note: PlayStation version developed by Midway Studios San Diego; Saturn and Windows versions developed by Point of View; Nintendo 64 version developed by Saffire; Game Boy Color version developed by Digital Eclipse.)
- Publishers: Midway; Ports: NA: Midway; EU: GT Interactive
- Designers: Brian Colin; Jeff Nauman
- Composers: Dave Zabriskie; Vince Pontarelli; Mike Colin
- Series: Rampage
- Platforms: Arcade, PlayStation, Sega Saturn, Nintendo 64, Game Boy Color, Windows
- Release: March 1997: Arcade; NA: March 1997 PlayStation; NA: October 21, 1997; EU: December 1997 Saturn; NA: November 26, 1997; EU: 1998 Nintendo 64; NA: March 30, 1998; EU: June 1998 Game Boy Color; NA: December 1998; EU: 1999
- Genre: Action
- Modes: Single-player, multiplayer
- Arcade system: Midway Wolf Unit

Rampage World Tour is a 1997 action video game developed by Game Refuge and published by Midway Games for arcades. It is the sequel to 1986's Rampage, and was designed by Brian Colin and Jeff Nauman, who designed the original game. Ports were released for the PlayStation, Sega Saturn, Nintendo 64, Game Boy Color, and Microsoft Windows. It was re-released on Midway Arcade Treasures 2 and included in Rampage: Total Destruction.

== Plot ==
The evil and corrupt Scumlabs causes an accident that unleashes three giant monsters named George, Lizzie, and Ralph. The trio begin to destroy all of Scumlabs' bases scattered throughout the world and kill its employees. In the last levels, Scumlabs CEO Eustace DeMonic turns himself into a monster in an attempt to combat George, Lizzie, and Ralph, but is defeated during a battle on a lunar base. After this, the only surviving Scumlabs employee, Dr. Elizabeth Veronica, tries to disintegrate the monsters with a ray gun on her spaceship, but it instead shrinks them to a miniature size, and they wind up inside her ship. George and Ralph pose on the shelves, while Lizzie bounces atop of Veronica's breasts (though the latter portion is censored on home ports).

== Gameplay ==
The player's goal is to destroy buildings; as pictured here in the arcade version, George is smashing a building as a tank approaches.

Like in the first Rampage game, the goal of every stage is to destroy all the buildings in each city while avoiding or destroying the military forces. If the player takes too long in destroying the city, jets will fly in and bomb the remaining buildings, ending the stage with a lower score.

In the first level, Peoria, a tourism billboard cycles through different regions in the country (Northeast, Southwest, etc.). Destroying the billboard when it is showing one of these regions will send the player in that direction. Players may also choose to eat or ignore the "World Tour" power-ups and control which country they can visit. After getting a World Tour power-up, the next few levels take place in a foreign location until a Scumlabs plant is destroyed. Purple radioactive waste temporarily transforms the player into a super monster known as V.E.R.N. The game will not end until every Scumlabs city has been destroyed, which may cause some erratic traveling around towards the end of the game (including multiple world tour trips if the players have missed or purposely kept from getting world tour flags).

The arcade version supports up to three players simultaneously. Though it was announced that the PlayStation version would also support three players, both the PlayStation and Saturn versions allow only two players. Three player support apparently was programmed into the port at one point and pulled at the last minute, since a review of the PlayStation version in Electronic Gaming Monthly describes three player gameplay. The Nintendo 64 conversion includes full three-player functionality.

== Release ==
The home ports were published in Europe by GT Interactive. Shortly after the home ports were released, Rampage World Tour was exhibited at the JAMMA arcade show in Japan, but garnered little interest. Despite this, the game was never released in Japan.

== Reception ==
Reception

Aggregate score
Aggregator	Score			
Aggregator	Arcade	N64	PS	Saturn
GameRankings		57%	59%	

Review scores
Publication	Score			
Publication	Arcade	N64	PS	Saturn
Electronic Gaming Monthly		5.75/10	7.75/10	
GameSpot		5.0/10	5.7/10	3.0/10
IGN		4.9/10	5.0/10	
N64 Magazine		54%		
Next Generation	2/5	2/5		
PlayStation Pro			4/10	
Sega Saturn Magazine				69%

Next Generation reviewed the arcade version of the game. They derided the decision to continue using sprites for the graphics instead of polygons, concluding that "Rampage World Tour seems aimed at satisfying gamers' yearning for past titles like Space Invaders or Pac-Man. Fair enough, but all this remake will accomplish is to make gamers yearn for the original more than ever."

Critics agreed that the console ports are nearly arcade-perfect, though some criticized the PlayStation and Saturn versions for supporting only two players instead of the three supported in the arcade version. However, they were divided about the game itself. Many hailed it as a fun revival of an arcade classic. For example, Shawn Smith wrote in Electronic Gaming Monthly that "There's nothing like sitting down and playing a good old-time game. It's even better to do it when it has been enhanced, but still has the same feel as the original." Despite giving the PlayStation version a score of only 5.7 out of 10, Jeff Gerstmann highly recommended the game due to its new gameplay tricks and larger levels, and said the only possible way to improve on it would be with three-player support. However, the majority criticized the game's 2D sidescrolling format as antiquated, and some further remarked that the simplicity and repetitiveness of the Rampage gameplay, while highly enjoyable in arcades, was not suited to the home console format. Adam Douglas explained in IGN that the Rampage series "was great for getting your aggressions out and then moving on. Why would you want to play this game for hours at a time?" Sega Saturn Magazine similarly held that "The coin-op was a great laugh for about ten minutes or so, but the lack of variety in the level design and the shallow nature of the gameplay meant that it soon grew quite tiresome. Despite the meagre improvements to the update, the very same criticisms can be levelled at Rampage World Tour." Even Smith showed a loss of enthusiasm in his review of the later Nintendo 64 version, now stating that the game is fun at first but quickly grows old. His co-reviewer John Ricciardi disagreed, saying that though the game lacks variety it can nonetheless be engrossing for hours on end.

In a review of the PlayStation version, GamePro was more undecided: "With plenty of special moves and power-ups to discover as you lay waste to more than 100 cities, the gameplay certainly lasts - just don't expect it to change much. Then again, sometimes it's good to turn off your brain and turn up the cosmic carnage." However, a different GamePro critic reviewed the Saturn version, and opined that the game's "utter failure to take advantage of new technology and add new elements to the original Rampage is inexcusable." A third GamePro critic, reviewing the Nintendo 64 version, likewise found that the game added little new and suffers from repetitive gameplay and music, and a lack of variety in the buildings which players spend most of their time demolishing. Next Generation reviewed the Nintendo 64 version of the game, and stated that "Despite the three-player mode, no amount of graphic flash or nostalgia can improve a style of gameplay whose day has passed."

Charles Ardai of Computer Gaming World noted that the PC port of the game had performance and graphics issues when played in full-screen mode. The best performance was achieved when the screen was set to a postcard-sized frame. He found the action to be basic, although there is a variety of animation. He added that it is "suffused with all the monster movie fun that was conspicuously lacking in the recent Godzilla film".
