= Bull Fight =

1984 video game

- Developer(s): Sega
- Publisher(s): JP: Sega; NA: Bally Midway
- Platform(s): Arcade
- Release: Arcade; 1984
- Genre(s): Isometric
- Mode(s): Up to 2 players, alternating turns

Bull Fight is a coin-operated arcade game produced by Sega in 1984.

== Description ==
The player assumes the role of a bullfighter attempting to defeat a bull. The bullfighter is controlled via a joystick and two buttons.
