= Virtual reality game =

Video game played in virtual reality

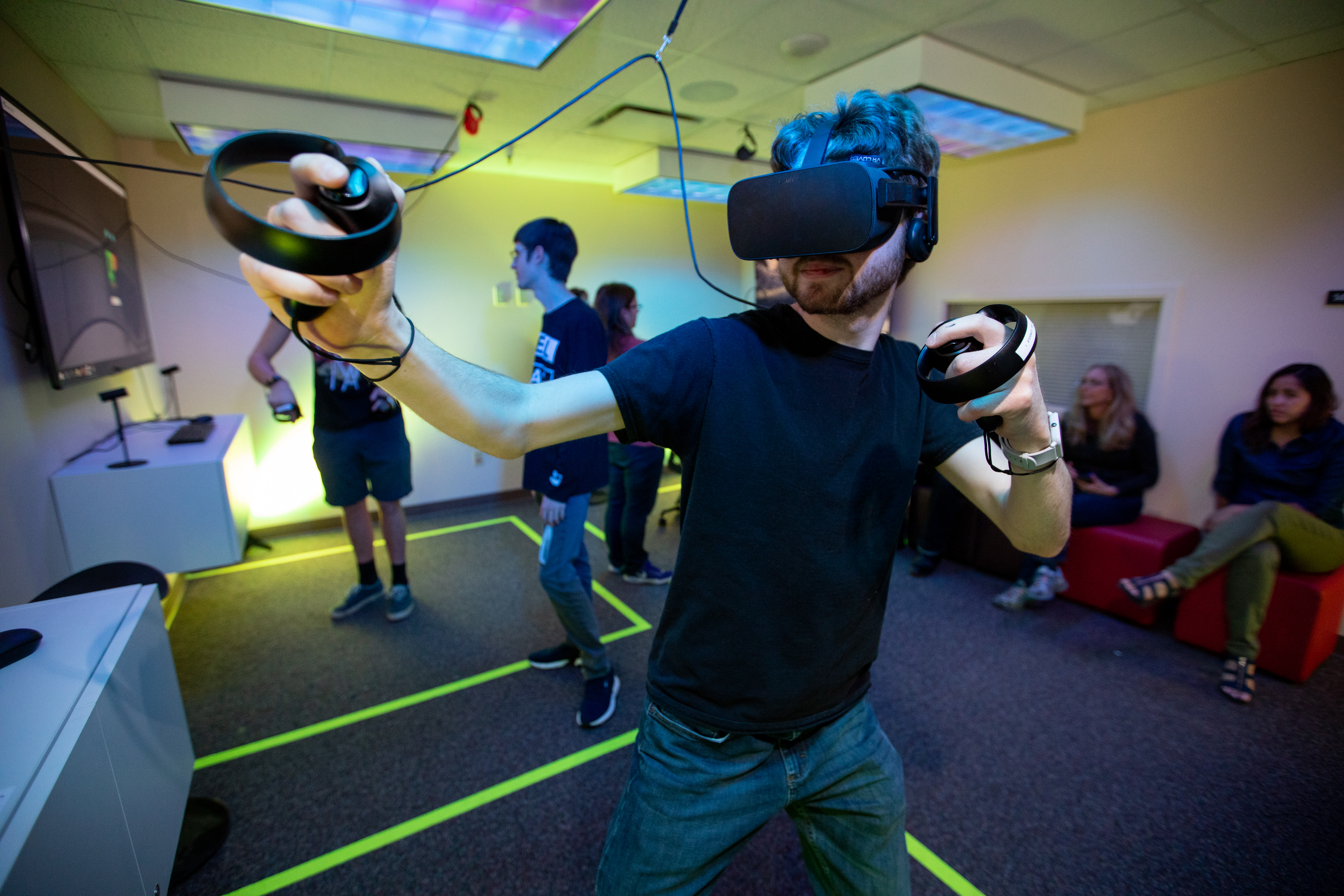
A player using the Oculus Rift, a virtual reality headset, and associated controllers to control a game

A virtual reality game (VR game) is a video game played on virtual reality (VR) hardware. Most VR games are based on player immersion, typically through a head-mounted display unit or headset with stereoscopic displays and one or more controllers.

The video game industry made early attempts at VR in the 1990s, most notably with Sega's VR-1 and Virtuality for arcades, along with unsuccessful attempts for home consoles with the Sega VR prototype and Nintendo's Virtual Boy. With the introduction of the first consumer-ready home VR product, the Oculus Rift, in 2013, home VR games soon followed, including existing games adapted for the VR hardware, and new games designed directly for VR. While VR hardware and games grew modestly for the remainder of the 2010s, Half-Life: Alyx, a full VR game developed by Valve and released in 2020, was considered the killer application for VR games.

== History ==
Research into virtual reality (VR) hardware and software started as early as 1968 by Ivan Sutherland and his student Bob Sproull, but most equipment was too expensive for consumer use, and its use for games was limited. The first VR head mounted display was connected to a computer. In the late 1980s, Jaron Lanier and Thomas G. Zimmerman, former programmers for Atari, Inc., began developing hardware under the name VPL Research, with Lanier coining the term "virtual reality" for their products. One of VPL's products was the VPL DataGlove; a glove that sensed the user's finger movement and translated it into computer input. The idea inspired engineers at Abrams/Gentile Entertainment (AGE) to work with Mattel and Nintendo to build a low-cost version of the DataGlove to work with the Nintendo Entertainment System (NES), omitting much of the technical sophistication and movement sensitivity of the DataGlove as to achieve a reasonable consumer cost. The Power Glove was released in 1989. The games Super Glove Ball and Bad Street Brawler were specifically designed to use the Power Glove, while other NES games could be played using the Power Glove by mapping its output to various controls. About one million Power Glove units were sold before Mattel discontinued it in 1990. Its low cost compared to the DataGlove and other similar gloves led academics to buy the unit for their own research.

=== Early VR games (1990s–2000s) ===
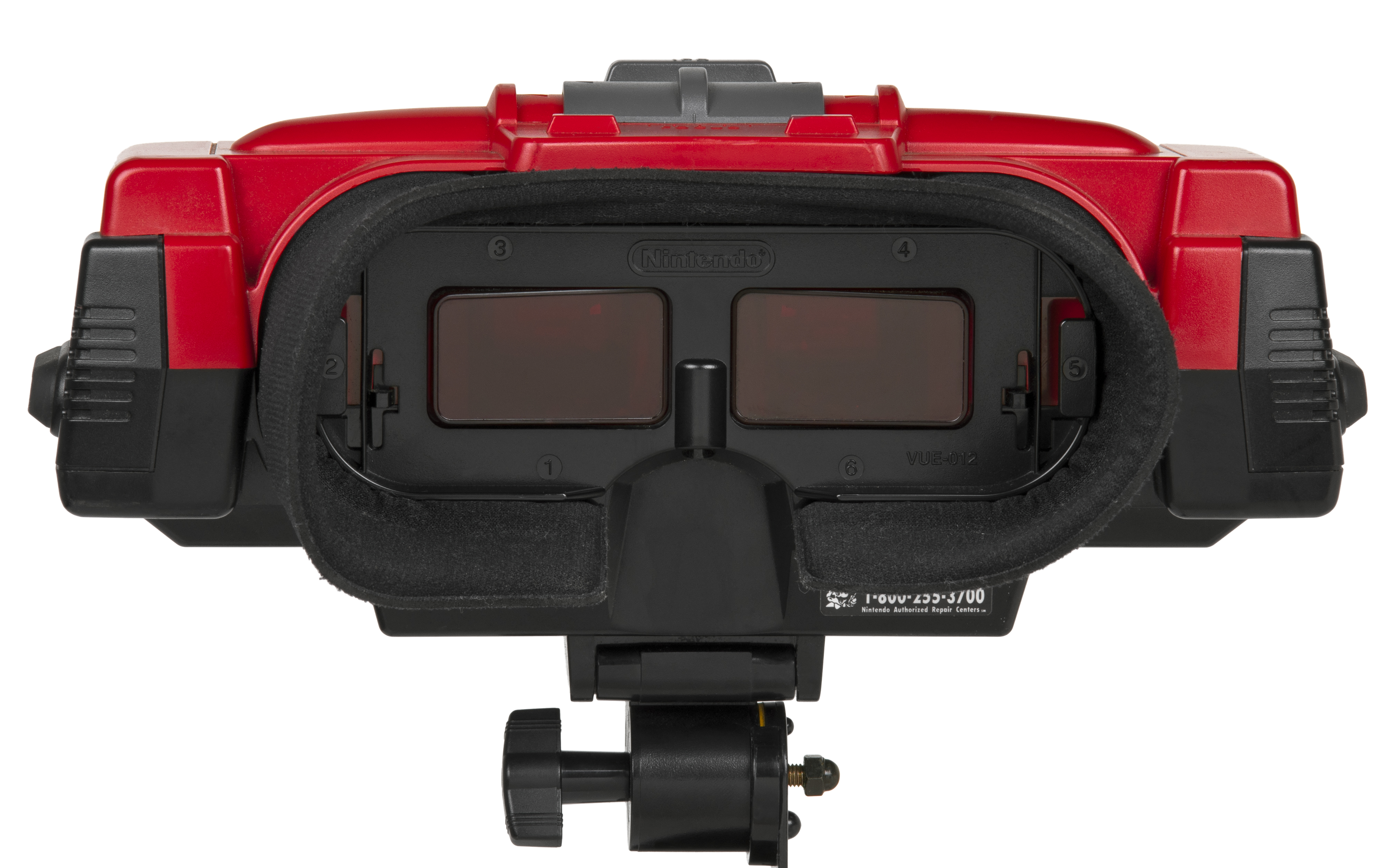
The heads-up viewscreen of Nintendo's Virtual Boy.

Interest in VR grew in the 1990s, particularly after the 1992 film Lawnmower Man, which helped popularize the idea of VR headsets with the general public. Sega developed a low-cost VR device, the Sega VR, in the early 1990s, for its arcade games and home consoles; the unit did not advance beyond the prototype stage, though Sega incorporated some of its head-tracking technology into its arcade cabinets. Most notable was the VR-1 virtual reality 3D arcade attraction released by Sega in 1994.

Reflection Technology, Inc. (RTI) had been developing a head-mounted, stereoscopic head-tracking system using light-emitting diode (LED) displays, the Private Eye. One application they had tested included a tank game. Seeking funding for larger production, RTI licensed the technology to Nintendo, and under Gunpei Yokoi, Nintendo developed the Virtual Boy, released in 1995. The Virtual Boy used red LED displays rather than full-color ones, as they were the most inexpensive to produce, and required mounting to a stand to be played, rather than head-mounted. The system was thus awkward to use both from looking into the viewer and the eyestrain from the red LEDs. Only 22 games were produced for the Virtual Boy, and it was considered to be one of Nintendo's commercial failures.

VR systems without head-mounted hardware were also developed in the 1990s, including the Cave automatic virtual environment (CAVE). CAVE systems included multiple flat screen displays, typically at least three walls to surround the human player, and incorporated some type of tracking sensor system to match the images on the walls to what direction the player was looking. Early applications of CAVE system were game-based demonstrations, but the cost remained prohibitive for commercial deployment even through the 2010s.

Around this same time in the 1990s, major innovations in real-time 3D graphics had been made across computer, console, and arcade video games, and with further improvements in affordable consumer technologies, arcade games began to decline as they could not compete with these innovations. Arcade game manufacturers instead focused on offering games that could not easily be replicated at home, which included the introduction of VR-based arcade games. For example, the Virtuality Group produced its Virtuality line of arcade games starting in the early 1990s that typically included a VR headset with head-tracking and other features. However, the cost and upkeep of these machines made it difficult to continue support for them.

There remained strong interest from academics to explore what VR, along with augmented reality and other mixed reality systems, could bring to video games, through the 2000s, but these games were mostly prepared for research proof-of-concepts to demonstrate the interaction of VR hardware, software, and human motion rather than for commercial release, since hardware costs were still high.

=== Introduction of consumer-ready hardware (2010s–present) ===
The popularity of digital gaming across multiple forms like mobile, console, and PC gaming, led technology companies to further invest in the development of VR technology. One catalyst to this modern VR boom was the success of Pokémon Go in 2016, which incorporated basic VR concepts, stirring the world with technological breakthroughs in gaming such as VR effects, combining real life scenes with the virtual world, as well as the concept of enjoying gaming alongside interaction in the real world.

After decades of attempts from its introduction, low-cost, consumer-grade VR hardware began to appear in the 2010s. The Oculus Rift is considered the first consumer-ready VR headset and was first released in 2016. The unit was developed by Palmer Luckey, and first announced in 2013 as an inexpensive VR option for video games. During testing, Luckey had gained the help of id Software's John Carmack to develop a VR version of Doom 3 for Oculus. While this helped to successfully demonstrate the Oculus, which led to Facebook acquiring Oculus in 2014 for $2 billion, it also led to a lawsuit between ZeniMax Media, id's parent company, against Oculus over intellectual property theft over Carmack's participation. The case was settled out of court. Nine games were available at launch and Oculus had established a number of partnerships to provide more games following its release.

The Oculus Rift announcement led to other VR developments. Sony Computer Entertainment developed the PlayStation VR system for the PlayStation 4, while Valve partnered with HTC to develop the HTC Vive; both of these units were released in 2016. Valve later developed their own headset without HTC, the Valve Index, which was released in 2019.

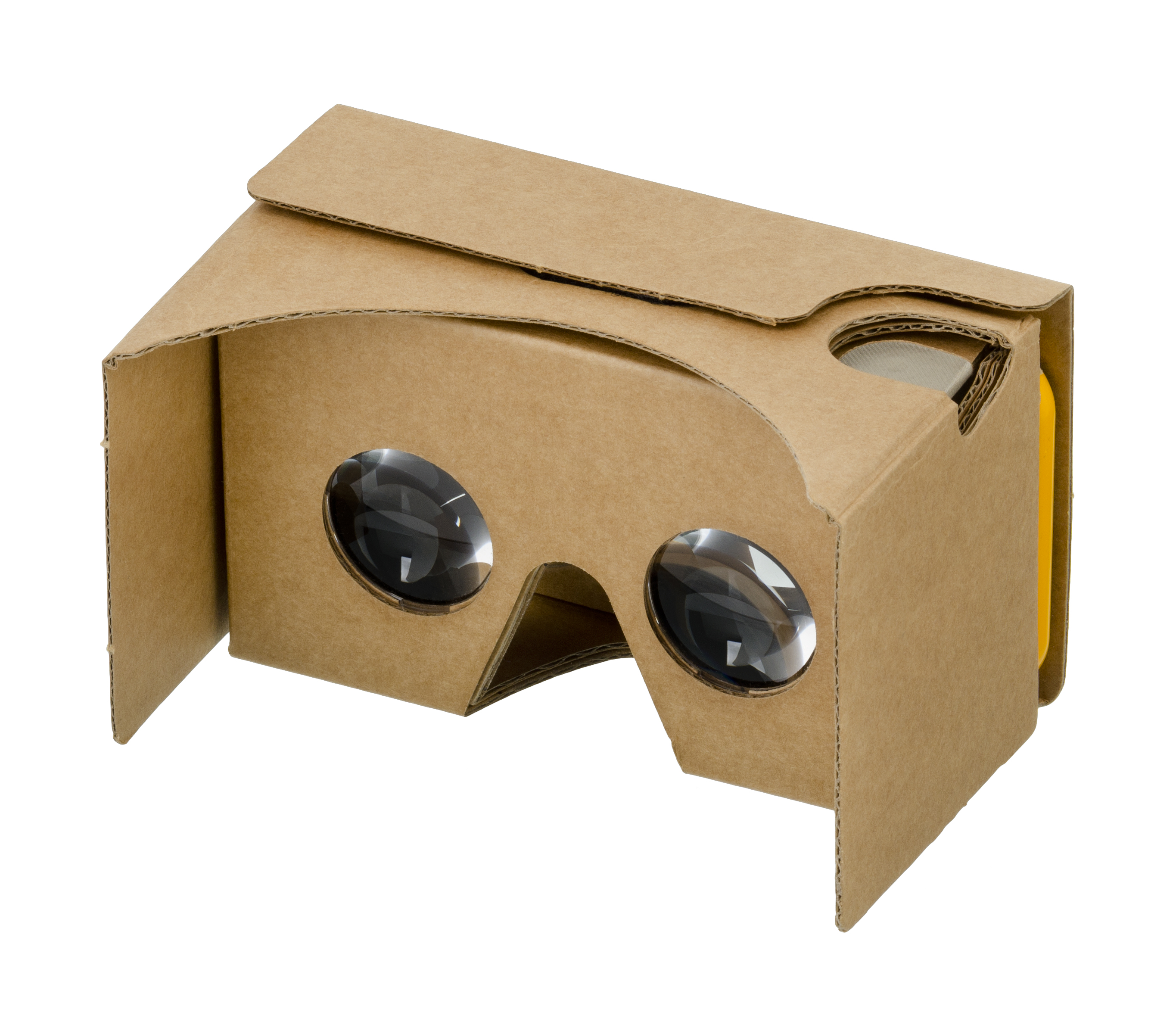
A Google Cardboard headset

As a result, more affordable headsets designed to accommodate mobile devices were also released, using the devices to create the stereoscopic display, some of the positioning functions, and other VR tracking embedded in the additional hardware. On June 25, 2014, Google officially introduced Google Cardboard, an inexpensive headset package that constructed from cardboard for use with Android phones; the completed headset creates the necessary visual space to support stereoscopic view from the phone's display. Samsung, in conjunction with Oculus, released the Samsung Gear VR in 2015 to support its Samsung Galaxy smartphones; services for the Gear VR ended in 2020. Nintendo released the Nintendo Labo VR Kit in 2019 as part of its Labo series of toys-to-life cardboard products. A handful of Nintendo Switch games support Labo VR functionality, such as the 2017 games Super Mario Odyssey and The Legend of Zelda: Breath of the Wild.

Despite the availability of low-cost hardware for VR, the technology had still not taken off for video games by 2018 as had been expected when the Oculus Rift was announced. This was attributed to the lack of a killer application, a game that would drive people to buy the hardware to play it. There had been several games from smaller studios that had been considered successful, such as Superhot VR and Beat Saber, but the triple-A studios had not ventured into the area. Sales of VR hardware had been steadily increasing since 2016, but were still under 10 million units by 2018, and there were signs manufacturers were starting to back off in this area.

Many journalists stated that the first "killer app" VR game was Half-Life: Alyx, developed by Valve and released in March 2020. Alyx includes a number of novel control schemes to avoid the motion sickness problems of previous VR games, such as the 2019 indie title Boneworks. Within a week of Alyx's announcement, Valve sold out of their stock of Index units and began taking pre-orders with expectations to fulfill before the game's release. Other VR hardware, including the Oculus, saw increased sales leading to the release of Alyx.In 2026 Valve included Alyx for free in the purchase of their Steam Frame to help boost sales of the 1,059 dollar headset.

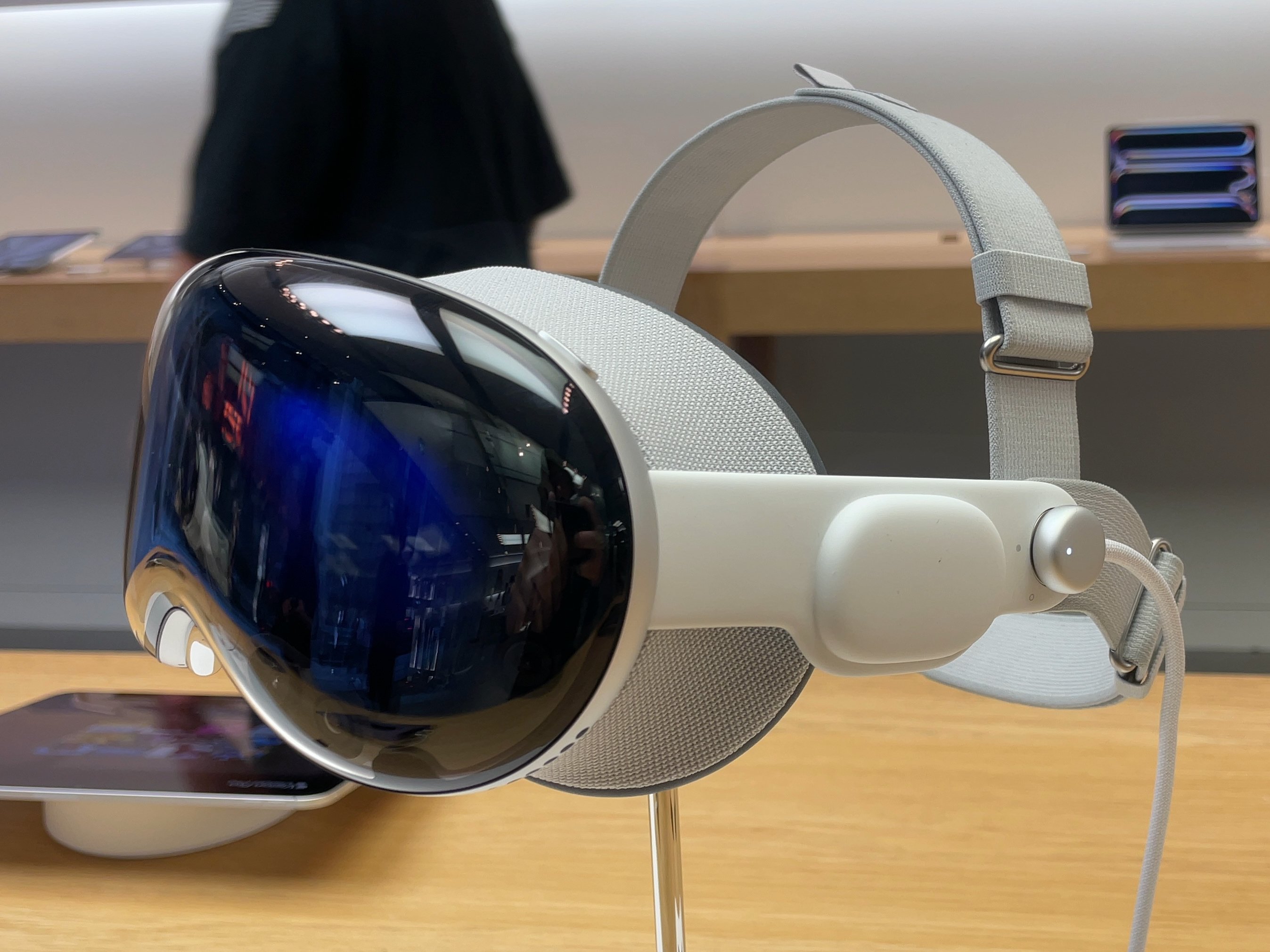
An Apple Vision Pro headset

In 2024, Apple Inc. released Apple Vision Pro. This device features hardware such as dual panels that offer 24 million pixels, surpassing devices such as the Oculus Rift. The integration of the R1 chip, working in tandem with the M2 chip, results in a polling rate of 12 milliseconds, getting rid of the dizzying latency issues that were prevalent in previous devices.

== Hardware ==
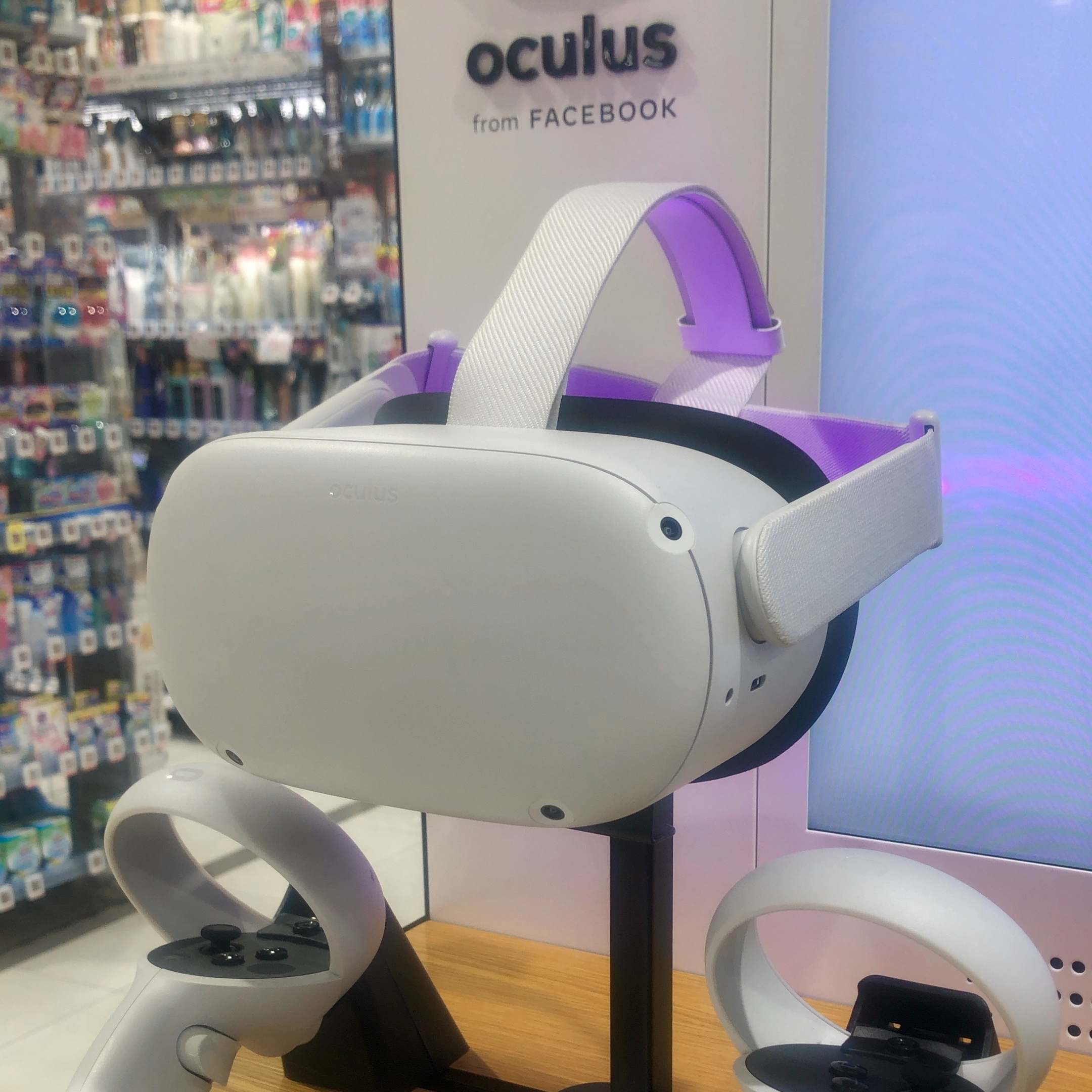
An Oculus Quest 2 VR headset

Nearly all VR games, as generally defined, require the use of a VR headset that provides stereoscopic displays that simulate three dimensional reality and create immersion for the player. Most headsets include some means of positional tracking to provide head-tracking (that is, to tell which direction a player's head is looking), either through sensors built into the unit or from external sensors or cameras that are placed at the corners of the play area. Some headsets further provide eye tracking like the Steam Frame and the Apple Vision Pro. To provide immersive audio, either surround sound speaker systems are used, or headsets may be outfitted with speakers or headphones for the player that provide 3D audio effects.

Some type of player input is also required. This is most commonly provided through the use of one or more game controllers. A controller can be as simple as a keyboard-and-mouse (KBM) or a standard game controller, or may be specialized hardware that includes positional tracking. Most often for specialized VR hardware, the player will have two controllers, one for each hand. These controllers may also provide haptic feedback to the user. Some headsets contain the capability to be used with controller free hand tracking like the Oculus Quest 2. For the Oculus Quest series it uses hand gestures to navigate its many menus. Hand controls can be used in apps designed specifically for them.

== Meta entering and leaving VR games(2014 - 2026) ==
Logo of Meta Quest

After buying oculus in 2014 for $2 Billion, Facebook released many different VR headsets. Their first consumer headset was the Oculus Rift made in 2016. It required a wired connection to a computer to function. In 2018 they made the Oculus Go. It was a stand alone portable VR headset with only 1 controller and no spatial tracking. The Oculus Go sold around 1.5 million units. The Oculus Quest and Rift S was then released in 2019. The Rift S was an updated version of the original Rift but now with motion tracking and controllers. The Quest added wire free tracking and using 2 controllers but with a worse screen than the Rift S. The Rift S was discontinued in 2021. The Oculus Quest sold under 1 million units and was discontinued in 2020, likely due to its proximity to its release with its successor. The Oculus Quest 2, released in 2020, is the highest selling VR headset at an estimated 20 million. It had hand tracking as well as an improved screen and battery life at a lower price than its competitors. Its lowered cost at $299 made it a popular gift for children. Because of this it captured a large younger player base. The quest 2 was sold at a loss but Facebook expected to make money back with their new digital storefront. All of these generated revenue through their digital store front unlike the previous wired headsets that often used Valves Steam. Facebook would take a 30% cut of all games sold. Around this time Facebook Renamed themselves to Meta. In 2021 Meta created Horizon worlds as the entree point to what they were calling the metaverse. The Metaverse was supposed to be a version of the internet fully using VR. Horizons worlds is structured in a similar model to popular gaming platforms like VR Chat and Roblox. It was made to be an engine that would hopefully empower a community to create with moderation from meta. Player created items would be sold to other players with a significant cut taken by Meta. While players could potentially make money Meta would take 47% of all purchases made player to player. It was initially released for free on all oculus quest headsets. After having disappointing player counts, Meta released the platform on mobile devices in 2023 and moved away from VR as horizon worlds main platform. Horizon still sees support on mobile but Meta has abandoned the VR side of it. In 2022 The Meta Quest Pro was released but quickly discontinued due to it being more expensive in 2024. The Quest 3 then gets released in 2023 selling 1.7 million. This was an under-performance compared to the Quest 2. Meta was operating at an extreme loss, losing around 13.7 billion in 2022. With the rise of generative AI and the underwhelming sales of the Quest 3, Meta has decided to no longer focus on VR going forward and switch their focus to AI. This is the highest selling VR company unable to turn a profit in the space. While meta will still be operating in the VR gaming space it is not their main focus moving forward. It also seems that the military VR work that Meta was creating is still under works, but not much is publicly available about that situation.

== Controls ==
Nearly all VR games are played from a first-person perspective to take advantage of the level of immersion created by the headset. Player input, which includes the motion of their head, hands, and body and any controller buttons or triggers they depress, are translated into actions within the game. Most commonly, the player's view of the game's environment will track with how they move their hand, and they will be shown virtual hands to guide them how to interact with the environment, with VR translating the player's motions one-to-one with the virtual appendages. While games can be controlled through traditional controls such as KBM or a standard console controller, these interfaces break the level of immersion, and instead, more specialized controllers are used, typically designed to fit naturally into a player's hand.

Gameplay of Job Simulator, a popular VR game, with the player's virtual hands manipulating the environment

VR offers several novel control schemes - how the player manipulates their in-game character through the game world and the direction they are looking - compared to the traditional free look or mouselook offered by the traditional KBM or standard controller. Movement and aim may be coupled between the headset and the controllers or may be decoupled, typically with the headset controlling the direction of movement and controller the aim, which generally leads to more immersive experiences.

Some VR systems such as the HTC Vive and Oculus offer room scale tracking, which not only incorporate the motions of the player but where they are physically located within a given area and the physical positioning of their body. This allows the player to move around the area as part of the VR experience. Games usually make this an optional experience since not all VR systems support it, and not all players have space to be able to move about. Example of games that support room scale tracking include Job Simulator and Rec Room. When room scale is not available, alternate movement schemes have been developed when character movement is required. A player may be moved automatically by the game as necessary, a player may need to look at a target location and indicate through a control scheme their desire to move their character to that spot, or the player may use more traditional controls such as an analog stick or keyboard presses to move their character.

== Design considerations ==
Virtual reality games are designed to enhance immersion—the perception that one is actually in the virtual world—and presence—the psychological effect that they are actually interacting with the virtual world outside of their physical bodies—concepts which cannot readily be done with traditional "flat screen" games played on a computer monitor or television.

A limiting factor for VR games until the 2010s was the overall system latency between a player's actions and the feedback they saw on the headset. For VR to be felt as an immersive experience, the latency needs to be as small as possible so that the player sees feedback in real-time soon following their actions. Technology bottlenecks had been from two major components of VR systems. One area was the rendering speed of computer hardware to update the 3D displays at a fast-enough frame rate. Frame rates of 20 Hz or less appear to most users as a series of separate images rather than continuous video stream, which breaks immersion. In the late 1990s, this computational power could only reasonably be delivered by high-performance workstations such as those from Sun Microsystems and Silicon Graphics. Since then, improvements in graphics processor technology and game engines with optimized rendering systems give consumer-grade hardware the capacity to perform high-speed real-time 3D rendering at 60 Hz or greater at resolutions appropriate for VR applications.

The second bottleneck is the processing time to convert tracking sensor information into feedback that is incorporated into the game. Earlier VR systems took some time for complete acquisition of all tracking sensor information into usable feedback to the user, but this was at a longer timescale compared to the traditional inputs and the display feedback cycle. Improvements have been made since in sensor technology and the software libraries to register movements, and VR games can also include other methods such as limited prediction of a player's movements, to bring sense feedback to the same timescale as rendering. Both issues combine to the overall factor of synchronization between the feedback loops. If the game takes too long to respond to a player's action, even if more than about 25 milliseconds, it further breaks the sense of immersion. While many of the latency problems are resolved with the VR hardware of the 2010s, VR games still must be programmed with these concerns in mind.

== Other VR games ==
In its current meaning, "virtual reality" generally has been taken to creating immersion and presence with the player by creating a new visual stimulus (through a VR headset for example) that obscures to real world view. This definition distinguishes VR from augmented reality where additional visual information is added atop the real world view. A broader definition of virtual reality can be taken to be any application that replaces one or more of the human senses with a virtual one. Thus, games featuring any alternative control scheme compared to a typical game controller or keyboard-and-mouse system could be considered as a virtual reality game, where the sense of touch of these traditional controls is replaced with a novel scheme. Such games would include those with alternate peripherals such as Dance Dance Revolution and Guitar Hero, or games featuring motion controls such as many Wii-based games. However, with the expansion of VR hardware in the 2010s, the use of "virtual reality" to include these types of games has been deprecated.

== Use in healthcare ==
Medical researchers have studied the use of virtual reality games in healthcare. For example, meta-analyses have demonstrated that virtual reality games could be used for stress management or to improve cognitive and physical functions among elderly post-stroke patients.

== See also ==
- Comparison of virtual reality headsets
- VRMMORPG
