= Bad Street Brawler =

1987 video game

- NES cover art
- Developer: Beam Software
- Publishers: Melbourne House; Mindscape; Mattel (NES)
- Composers: NES; Gavan Anderson; Tania Smith
- Platforms: Commodore 64, MS-DOS, NES, ZX Spectrum
- Release: 1987
- Genre: Beat 'em up
- Mode: Single-player

Bad Street Brawler is a beat 'em up video game published by Mattel in 1989 for the Nintendo Entertainment System. It was originally released for home computers as Bop'n Rumble in North America and as Street Hassle in Europe.

Versions were released in 1987 for the ZX Spectrum and Commodore 64 by Melbourne House in Europe and for the C64 and MS-DOS by Mindscape in North America. The Nintendo Entertainment System conversion from Mattel followed in September 1989. It is one of only two games specifically designed for use with Mattel's Power Glove.

== Gameplay ==
In-game screenshot

The player assumes the role of Duke Davis (the back of the box calls him Duke Dunnegan), who goes from stage to stage beating up gangsters that get in his way. He is dressed in a yellow tank top, sunglasses, and yellow pants, and is described as a former punk rocker and the "world's coolest" martial artist.

Before each stage, a quote is presented (e.g., "Never trouble trouble until trouble troubles you"). The player fights a variety of enemies, such as gorillas and circus dwarves that can throw hammers (old ladies in the computer versions throw purses). There are a total of 15 stages. Moves include the "bull ram" attack and "trip" move.

== Development ==
Coverage of the Nintendo version was set to be announced at the Winter CES 1988 by Mindscape, but was pulled at the Summer CES 1988, and a conversion of the arcade game Paperboy took its place.

== Reception ==
Electronic Gaming Monthly's Seanbaby placed it as number 16 in his "20 worst games of all time" feature.

Zzap!64 called it "A extremely strange but enjoyable beat 'em up", giving it an overall score of 80%.

== See also ==
- List of beat 'em ups
- Super Glove Ball
