= Paperboy (video game) =

1985 video game

- North American arcade flyer
- Developer: Atari Games (Note: Acorn Electron, Amstrad CPC, Commodore 64/16, BBC Micro and Plus/4 versions developed by Elite Systems; NES and Game Boy versions developed by Eastridge Technology; Master System and Game Gear versions developed by Tiertex; Genesis/Mega Drive version developed by MotiveTime; Nintendo 64 version developed by High Voltage Software.)
- Publishers: Atari Games: Arcade; NA: Atari Games; JP: Namco BBC Micro, CPC, Electron, C16, Plus/4, ZX Spectrum Elite Systems Amiga, Atari ST, C64, MS-DOS; NA: Mindscape; EU: Elite Systems Apple II, IIGS, NES, Game Boy Mindscape Master System Sega Lynx Atari Corporation Genesis/Mega Drive, Game Gear Tengen Game Boy Color, Nintendo 64 Midway Home Entertainment
- Designers: John Salwitz; Dave Ralston; Russel Dawe; Carl Bedard
- Composers: Hal Canon; Earl Vickers
- Platform: Arcade: ZX Spectrum, Amstrad CPC, BBC Micro, Acorn Electron, Commodore 16, Commodore 64, Plus/4, Apple II, Apple IIGS, MS-DOS, NES, Amiga, Atari Lynx, Atari ST, Master System, Game Gear, Genesis/Mega Drive, Game Boy, Game Boy Color, Nintendo 64, mobile phone, Xbox 360, iPhone, iPod Touch
- Release: February 1985: Arcade; EU: February 1985; NA: April 1985; JP: October 1985 ZX Spectrum; UK: September 15, 1986 CPC, , C16, Plus/4; EU: 1986 BBC Micro, Electron; EU: 25 May 1987 C64; EU: 1986; NA: September 1987 Apple II, IIGS; April 1988 MS-DOS; NA: August 1988; UK: October 1989 NES; NA: December 1988; JP: January 30, 1991; UK: 1991 Amiga; NA: September 1989; EU: October 1989 Atari ST; NA/EU: October 1989 Game Boy; NA: July 1990; EU: October/November 1990 Master System; NA: 1990; EU: November 1990 Lynx; NA: 1990; EU: 1990 Genesis/Mega Drive; NA: February 1992; JP: June 26, 1992; EU: 1992 Game Gear; UK: September 24, 1992 Game Boy Color; NA: May 30, 1999 Nintendo 64; NA: November 4, 1999 Mobile; NA: May 2006 Xbox 360; NA/UK: February 14, 2007 iPhone, iPod Touch; WW: December 18, 2009
- Genre: Action
- Modes: Single-player, multiplayer
- Arcade system: Atari System 2

Paperboy is a 1985 action video game developed and published by Atari Games for arcades. The player takes the role of a paperboy who delivers a fictional newspaper called The Daily Sun to houses on a street while riding his bicycle. The arcade version featured bike handlebars as the controller.

The game was widely ported to home systems beginning in 1986, and was followed by the computer and console-exclusive sequel Paperboy 2 in 1991.

== Gameplay ==
The player tries to deliver newspapers to subscribers along a suburban street.

The player assumes the role of a paperboy on a bicycle delivering newspapers along a suburban street in the United States, which is displayed in an oblique projection view. Controls consist of a set of handlebars that can be turned/tilted to steer and control speed, with mounted buttons that can be pressed to throw papers.

At the start of the game, the player is offered a choice of three difficulty settings: Easy Street, Middle Road, and Hard Way. The latter two options double or triple all point values, respectively. The street consists of 20 houses, 10 of which are originally decorated in bright colors to mark them as subscribers.

The primary goal is to deliver papers to subscribers by throwing them either onto the front porch or into the mailbox, while avoiding obstacles such as cars, skateboarders, and rolling tires. Bonus points are awarded for damaging non-subscribers' houses (breaking windows, knocking over tombstones, etc.) and hitting certain obstacles with papers. The player has a limited supply of papers and must pick up bundles lying on the ground in order to restock. After completing the route, the player moves onto a training course and can earn points for hitting targets and using ramps to jump over walls/ditches/holes, with an unlimited supply of papers. Crashing into any obstacle on the route costs the player one life, while doing so on the training course ends it immediately without penalty.

After the training course, the player earns bonus points for each successful delivery and advances to the next level. Any subscribers who did not receive a paper or who suffered damage to their houses will cancel their subscriptions, while making all deliveries will double the bonus and add one subscriber to the route, up to a maximum of 10.

The game consists of seven levels, each corresponding to a different day from Monday through Sunday. Papers on the Sunday level are heavier than on earlier days and thus travel more slowly when thrown. The game ends once each life is exhausted, all subscriptions are canceled, or the player completes the Sunday training course, whichever comes first. In the last case, the player earns a bonus for any remaining lives.

== Development ==
In February 1983, during a brainstorming session at Atari, game designer Dave Ralston came up with the idea of a kid riding down the street on a bicycle and delivering papers. He took inspiration from his childhood experience of delivering newspapers. He drew the concepts on a cocktail napkin, and later a transparency paper for an overhead projector. When Ralston presented the idea for the game, named Paperboy, to the Atari leadership, it was approved and he received praise and allowance to develop the concept further. Programmer John Salwitz was initially reluctant to work on the game, but eventually came around to the idea and joined the team.

Paperboy's graphics, character concepts and art, and animation were done by Will Noble. The game originally featured a cast of "bizarre" enemy characters, including giant snails, ducks in business suits, ghosts, the Grim Reaper, the Wolfman, and scientists playing pianos. The only "ordinary" character was an old lady pushing a shopping cart. Street traffic included rolling pianos, huge nails, and speedboats. Early focus groups responded negatively to these designs, except the old lady. Salwitz stated that the game "did not resonate with the players because the reality [they] created was unreal". Product marketing executive Don Trager told the developers to concentrate on the focus group's few positive comments, and Russell "Rusty" Dawe took over as the new project manager. The cast of characters was changed to include people and animals from real life, such as bullies, alcoholics, burglars, skateboarders, joggers, breakdancers, cats, dogs, and swarms of bees. The Grim Reaper and the Wolfman were some of the "bizarre" characters that made the final cut. The vehicles were drawn by Ralston, with cars replacing the pianos and speedboats and the developers' initials being hidden in the vehicles (Ralston's were hidden in a construction sign). The street play field was also changed. Ralston created two 5-feet long foam storyboards of the entire street and transferred line drawings of the houses to them, then put a plastic sheet over it and drew the characters, items and objects. The orange and blue colors of the scores for the players in multiplayer mode were inspired by Salwitz and Ralston's love for the San Francisco Giants and Los Angeles Dodgers, respectively. Instead of having the player take the score away from others, the developers wanted to take the score from the player for breaking subscribers' windows. Creative director Lyle Rains came up with the idea of the "breakage bonus", separate from the main score. Due to the game having three difficulty settings, the team created the "Grand Slam High Score Table" to tie the three streets together and reward the player with a high score, hiring programmer Bob Flanagan to write it.

The cabinet is a standard upright, but with custom controls. The controls consist of a bicycle handlebar (a modified Star Wars yoke) with one button on each side, used to throw papers. The handlebars, created by mechanical engineer Milt Loper, can be pushed forward to accelerate and pulled back to brake. The game runs on the Atari System 2 hardware, designed by hardware engineer Doug Snyder and debugged by technician Linda Sinkovic. The CPU is a 10 MHz Digital Equipment Corporation (DEC) T-11. The programming code was written in BLISS. The game utilizes a 60-degree isometric perspective, inspired by Sega's Zaxxon. According to Salwitz, the isometric design made scrolling and drawing difficult for the team, as they were doing the former technique at an odd angle in the play field, and this meant that the sides of the houses (which were not playable surfaces) would be shown on-screen just as much as the front. The 60-degree angle of the on-screen paperboy was slightly adjusted to make the handlebars parallel to the front of the houses and make aiming papers easier. The development team wanted to include a papergirl as a playable character, but she was cut due to low memory. For sound and coin inputs, the game uses a 2.2 MHz MOS Technology 6502. The sound chips are two POKEYs for digital sound, a Yamaha YM2151 for music, and a Texas Instruments TMS5220 for speech. The music was composed by sound designer Hal Canon, using RPM (Rusty's POKEY Music), a sound driver developed by Dawe, while composer Brad Fuller and Earl Vickers did the sound and voice effects. Paperboy was planned to be the first video game to use the YM2151, but delays in development led to Marble Madness becoming the first game to use the chip instead. Vickers also wrote most of the game's dialogue and held auditions for voice talent. The narration was provided by programmer Peter Thompson, and the character of the paperboy was voiced by Trager. The protection chip is a Slapstic model 137412-105.

== Ports ==
Elite Systems produced a version for the ZX Spectrum which was released in the United Kingdom in September 1986, and went on to release versions for the Commodore 64, BBC Micro, Acorn Electron, Amstrad CPC, Commodore 16, and Plus/4 over the following months.

In the United States, a Nintendo Entertainment System (NES) version was developed by Eastridge Technology and published by Mindscape in December 1988. Coverage of the NES version abruptly began at the Summer CES 1988 as a last-minute replacement for a port of the computer title Bad Street Brawler, which was about to be ported to the NES. An Apple II version was also published by Mindscape that same year, including a slightly modified version for the Apple IIGS (which was highly criticized as a redress of the same 8-bit game). In October 1989, Elite released versions for the Atari ST and MS-DOS in the United Kingdom, followed by an Amiga version later that month.

A Game Boy version by Mindscape was released in North America in July 1990, followed by the United Kingdom in October or November 1990. A Master System version by Sega and U.S. Gold was released in the UK in November 1990. Atari Corporation released a version of Paperboy for the Atari Lynx in 1990. By March 1991, an NES version by Mindscape had been released in the United Kingdom.

== Reception ==
Reception

Review scores
Publication	Score					
Publication	Atari Lynx	Game Boy	GBC	Master System	NES	PC
ACE		816/1000				800/1000
AllGame	2.5/5		2.5/5		3/5	
Computer and Video Games	67%			88%		
GamePro	17/25					
IGN	7/10		4/10			
Raze	78%	89%		76%		
Zero						79/100
Console XS				81%		
Mean Machines		67%		85%	30%	

Awards
Publication	Award
Computer and Video Games	C+VG Hit
Your Sinclair	Megagame

In the United States, Paperboy was the top-grossing arcade conversion kit of December 1985. In Japan, it was listed by Game Machine as the fifth most successful upright arcade unit of October 1985.

Upon its debut at London's Amusement Trades Exhibition International (ATEI) show in early 1985, Computer and Video Games magazine gave the arcade game a mixed review, praising the controls, but criticizing the difficulty. The arcade game was runner-up for Computer Gamer magazine's best coin-op game award, which was won by Capcom's Commando. In 2007, Spanner Spencer of Eurogamer rated the arcade version 9 out of 10 and praised its gameplay, graphics, and music.

The ZX Spectrum port topped the UK monthly sales chart in September 1986, and the release of the Commodore 64 version took the game to the number one position again in November. It went on to become the seventh best-selling video game of 1986 in the UK.

Advanced Computer Entertainment (ACE) offered praise for the Atari ST version, awarding it a score of 850 out of 1,000, while Zero gave it a score of 86 out of 100. ACE and Zero noted that the Atari ST version looked and played like the arcade version. Computer Gamer gave the ZX Spectrum version a rating of 16 out of 20, considering it to be a faithful conversion of the arcade game, while noting that some people may find the gameplay to be repetitive. For the ZX Spectrum, Commodore 64 and Amstrad CPC versions, ACE gave the game a rating of 5 out of 5, noting the "extremely well executed" graphics and referring to the game as a "budget classic". UK magazine Computer and Video Games (CVG) gave the Commodore 64 version a 52 percent rating, criticizing its music and "blocky and ill-proportioned" sprites; the magazine gave the ZX Spectrum version an 83 percent rating. Ken McMahon of Commodore User reviewed the Commodore 16 and Plus/4 version and rated it 6 out of 10, noting that it was too easy.

Crash gave the ZX Spectrum version an 88% rating with the general rating "Another slick, playable conversion from Elite", while Zzap!64 was less enthusiastic for the Commodore 64 version giving it 44%. In 1993, Zzap!64 rated the Commodore 64 version a 60 percent score, calling it repetitive. Richard Leadbetter of CVG reviewed the Lynx version and stated, "Looks good, but simply isn't enough fun to play." STart's Clayton Walnum similarly praised the Lynx version's graphics and sound effects, but deemed the game "just another shoot-em-up without the shooting." Raze offered praise for the clear and colorful graphics of the Lynx version, but stated that the game "is too old and tired for the exciting and new Lynx." AllGame's Kyle Knight criticized the Lynx version for its simple sound effects and music, as well as its repetitive gameplay.

Leadbetter praised the Master System version, calling it "one of the best arcade conversions" available for the system, while noting that the game's only "slight downer" was the music. Mean Machines praised the Master System version for its graphics and similarities to the arcade game, while Raze wrote a mixed review for the Master System version. Mean Machines was critical of the NES version for its graphics, sound, and controls, and concluded that it was, "A highly offensive product which weighs in as a sadly derisive conversion of a classic coin-op." Brett Alan Weiss of AllGame stated that Mindscape did a good job of porting the game to the NES. Weiss praised the controls and sound effects of the NES version, but criticized the music. Raze considered the Game Boy version to be "Excellent", while Mean Machines criticized its controls, blurry scrolling, and the lack of colorful graphics, which could not be produced by the system. ACE noted slightly difficult controls and poor sound effects for the Game Boy version. Polish magazine Top Secret gave the Genesis version 5 out of 5 checks, praising the graphics, animation, and music, thus favoring the port over the other contemporary versions.

The One gave the Amiga version 80% stating that "it's an almost flawless conversion" of the arcade game. ACE gave the Amiga version a rating of 878, calling it a perfect conversion of the arcade game. Tony Dillon of Commodore User gave the Amiga version an 83 percent rating and deemed it to be nearly identical to the arcade version. Gordon Houghton of CVG gave the Amiga version a 69 percent rating, stating that the sound was "arguably better" than the arcade version, but noting the graphics were "jerky" and the gameplay had been altered from the arcade version. Houghton concluded that it was "not a bad game, but it's too old and too expensive to deserve greater praise." Compute! praised the music and graphics of the Amiga version, but considered the gameplay to be outdated and repetitive. Robert A. Jung of IGN reviewed the Lynx version in 1999, and considered it to be a "decent" adaptation of the arcade game. Jung noted the "average-quality" graphics and sound, and concluded, "Not a bad game, though not one of the Lynx's best."

IGN's Craig Harris reviewed a Game Boy Color version and stated that it "is definitely the worst rendition of the game, even beating out the Atari Lynx's waterdown port of the arcade game." Harris criticized the music, the lack of speech audio from the original game, poor collision detection, and an absence of fun. Scott Alan Marriott of AllGame praised the Game Boy Color version for its colorful graphics, but noted that the game did not introduce any new changes from the original arcade version, writing, "Those expecting a lot of changes or additions will be disappointed."

Polish magazine Top Secret gave the Genesis game 5 out 5 checks, regarding it as the best version of Paperboy.

=== Later releases ===
Reception

Aggregate score
Aggregator	Score			
Aggregator	iOS	mobile	N64	Xbox 360
Metacritic				71/100

Review scores
Publication	Score			
Publication	iOS	mobile	N64	Xbox 360
AllGame			1.5/5	
Eurogamer				7/10
GameRevolution			C−	
GameSpot			5.4/10	6.8/10
GamesRadar+				3.5/5
IGN		7/10	8/10	6.7/10
Official Xbox Magazine (US)				7/10
TeamXbox				8.2/10
Digital Spy	3/5			
Pocket Gamer	5/10			

Versions of Paperboy were released for the Nintendo 64, Xbox 360 and iPhone and iPod Touch. Dean Austin of IGN criticized the retro 3D look of the Nintendo 64 version, but praised the gameplay and considered it to be a "great game". Daniel Erickson of Daily Radar criticized the "bland" and "repetitive" gameplay of the Nintendo 64 version. Robert Amsbury of GameRevolution praised the sound effects in the Nintendo 64 version, but considered the music to be repetitive, while noting the game "isn't really all that fun." Weiss criticized the Nintendo 64 version for its music and sound effects, as well as poor controls, and wrote that the game had "some of the ugliest graphics you'll find in a Nintendo 64 cartridge." Ben Stahl of GameSpot noted the outdated sound effects used in the Nintendo 64 version, and stated, "While a decent game on its own, Paper Boy 64 doesn't capture the magic of the original arcade game." IGN's Levi Buchanan, reviewing a cell phone version, praised the controls and stated that it looked and played like the original arcade game.

According to Metacritic, the Xbox 360 version received "Mixed or average reviews". TeamXbox gave the Xbox 360 version an overall score of 8.2, stating that "Paperboy "delivers" as advertised in the classifieds." Greg Sewart of GamesRadar considered the Xbox 360 version to be an "authentic recreation" of the arcade version, but noted that the game, like previous versions, suffers from imprecise controls due to the absence of the arcade game's handlebar controller. Jeff Gerstmann of GameSpot reviewed the Xbox 360 release and was disappointed by the lack of new sound effects and music, as well as the lack of graphical updates. Gerstmann stated that the game would most likely appeal to people who "have fond memories" of the original arcade game. IGN's Erik Brudvig, reviewing the Xbox 360 version, considered the game to be a limited amount of fun. Brudvig noted the lack of a handlebar controller and stated "Thanks to the isometric view, this version of Paperboy suffers from the same wonky controls that every home version of the game has." Kristan Reed of Eurogamer praised the Xbox 360 release for its controls and noted that the game "stands up pretty well" despite its age. He also stated that the game quickly becomes repetitive. Corey Cohen of Official Xbox Magazine praised the Xbox 360 version for its music and controls, and noted that it was as appealing as the arcade version.

Tarryn van der Byl of Pocket Gamer criticized the iPhone version for its poor controls, and stated that the game's optional 3D graphics mode was "ugly and feels clumsy and inaccurate." Slide to Play considered the iPhone/iPod version a "mixed bag", but praised the gameplay. Mark Langshaw of Digital Spy reviewed the iPhone version and stated that it would likely appeal most to fans of the original game. Langshaw concluded, "As far as nostalgic remakes go, Paperboy delivers but doesn't quite do enough to make the front page."

According to Metacritic, Paperboy: Special Delivery has a score of 55 out of 100, indicating "Mixed or average reviews". Blake Patterson of TouchArcade deemed Paperboy: Special Delivery to be an improvement over Elite's iPhone version, praising the improved controls and graphics. Jon Mundy of Pocket Gamer rated the game 5 out of 10, criticizing the gameplay and controls, and writing that the biggest flaw "is the game's technical shortcomings. The graphics are extremely basic and yet the game paused and stuttered repeatedly on my second-generation iPod touch." Andrew Nesvadba of AppSpy rated the game 3 out of 5, praising the updated graphics while criticizing the controls. Nesvadba also praised the addition of a story mode, but criticized its short length. Jeremiah Leif Johnson of Gamezebo gave the game three stars out of five, praising the story mode and the 1980s-style graphics, but criticizing the poor controls.

== Legacy ==
A sequel, Paperboy 2, was released in 1991 for several home systems.

Paperboy, in its original arcade form, is included in the 1998 PlayStation video game Arcade's Greatest Hits: The Atari Collection 2. The Game Boy Color version, developed by Digital Eclipse Software and published by Midway, was released in the United States on May 30, 1999. By July 1997, developer High Voltage Software had started conceptual development of the Nintendo 64 version and was searching for a game publisher, with a possible release in 1998. In August 1998, Midway announced that it would be publishing the Nintendo 64 game, which was still in conceptual stages and was expected for release in late 1999. The game was developed using a 3D polygonal game engine, and was released in North America on November 4, 1999.

In May 2000, Midway announced plans to release Paperboy for the PlayStation later that year, although the game was never released. Paperboy was later included in the 2003 video game Midway Arcade Treasures, a compilation of arcade games for the GameCube, PlayStation 2, Xbox, and Microsoft Windows. In 2005, Paperboy was included in the compilation Midway Arcade Treasures: Extended Play for the PlayStation Portable. In May 2005, Sega Mobile announced that it would release Paperboy for mobile phones. The game was released in May 2006. The Xbox 360 version of Paperboy was released on February 14, 2007, on Xbox Live Arcade. However, the game was removed by 2010.

The iPhone/iPod Touch version was released through the App Store on December 18, 2009. The game was developed by Vivid Games and published by Elite Systems. Elite removed the game from the App Store in March 2010, because of a licensing conflict. Glu Mobile developed and published a new iPhone/iPod Touch version, titled Paperboy: Special Delivery, on November 4, 2010. The game included a 20-level story mode in which the paperboy is saving money from his job to buy a new game console, but he later falls in love and throws roses instead of newspapers. The game also featured an optional tilt-based control mode in which the iPhone is tilted to control the paperboy.

A port of Paperboy can be accessed in the 2015 video game Lego Dimensions by using the Arcade Dock in the level "Painting the Town Black". It is also an included title on the Midway Legacy Edition Arcade1Up cabinet.

=== In other media ===
- In the early development stages of the DIC Entertainment animated series Captain N: The Game Master, the protagonist of Paperboy (here given the name "Buddy") was intended to be the protagonist of the show, with the series itself being called Buddy Boy after him. While these ideas were dropped, elements from Paperboy were used in the second season Captain N episode "The Invasion of the Paper Pedalers", where the character was named Julio and lived on "News World" in Videoland.
- The game's titular protagonist made cameo appearances in Disney's Wreck-It Ralph and 2015's Pixels.
- In 2021, DC Comics published the limited series Spy Hunter & Paper Boy, written by Larry Hama and illustrated by Mac Rey. The comic is a crossover between the worlds of the Paper Boy and Spy Hunter games.
