= Paperboy 2 =

1991 video game

- Game Boy cover art
- Developers: Tengen; Eastridge Technology (NES); Manley & Associates (Game Gear)
- Publishers: Mindscape; Tengen (Genesis and Game Gear)
- Composers: Rich Shemaria (Amiga, MS-DOS, Game Boy, NES, SNES); Robert Ridihalgh (Game Gear)
- Platforms: Amiga, Amstrad CPC, MS-DOS, Game Boy, Game Gear, Genesis, NES, SNES, ZX Spectrum
- Release: 1991
- Genre: Action
- Modes: Single-player, multiplayer

Paperboy 2 is an action video game, the sequel to the arcade video game Paperboy. It was released in 1991–1992 for Amiga, Amstrad CPC, MS-DOS, Game Boy, Game Gear, Genesis, Nintendo Entertainment System, Super NES, and ZX Spectrum. While Paperboy debuted in arcades and was subsequently ported to personal computers and consoles, the sequel was only released for home systems.

== Gameplay ==
The game was much like the original: the player controls a paperboy (or papergirl) who must navigate a series of obstacles, such as tires rolling down a driveway while a car is being repaired, or strange houses like a haunted house, while trying to deliver the morning paper to various customers on a street (though unlike its predecessor, papers had to be delivered to houses on both sides of the street). Like the original, the game is renowned for its difficulty.

There are four specific actions that can be taken somewhere in the middle of each stage that reward the player with a front-page photo on the newspaper afterwards. Such actions included breaking a window with a paper, where the next day's paper would read "Mysterious Vandalism Baffles Police", showing an angry policeman looking at broken windows. Others could be coming across a gas station being robbed and hitting the gunman with a paper behind his back, then having the next day's paper headlined with "Paperboy {Papergirl} Foils Armed Robbery" or seeing a runaway baby carriage and stopping it with a paper, and the forthcoming headline being "Girl {Boy} Saves Breakway Baby". Both heroic stories would show a happy policeman rewarding the paperboy with candy.

== Reception ==
Reception

Review scores
Publication	Score
Electronic Gaming Monthly	6/10, 6/10, 5/10, 6/10 (Game Boy)
Power Unlimited	78/100 (Game Gear)

Award
Publication	Award
Amstrad Action	Mastergame

Among the four reviewers in Electronic Gaming Monthly, they described the Game Boy version of the game as suffering from the limitations of the size of the Game Boy's screen and the black and white graphics with two reviewers recommending it to fans of the original game. Ed Ricketts of Amiga Format gave the Amiga version a 44 percent rating. N-Force gave the NES version a 42 percent rating. Jonathan Gagnon of Game Players gave the Game Gear version a 5 out of 10. Jonathan Davies of Super Play gave the SNES version a 29 percent rating. Brett Alan Weiss of AllGame gave the SNES version one and a half stars out of five. Total! gave the NES version 50 out of 100, criticizing its poor camera and controls, as well as the music and gameplay. Sega Force reviewed the Mega Drive/Genesis version and rated it 55 out of 100. The magazine praised the music and sound effects, but criticized the repetitive gameplay, and stated that the game looked outdated compared to other games available at the time. Power Unlimited gave the Game Gear version a score of 78% writing: "One of the most American games ever made, and addictive too. The Game Gear version looks very good. A blunder is the music, which becomes very annoying at a certain point."
