= Power Glove =

Controller accessory for the Nintendo Entertainment System

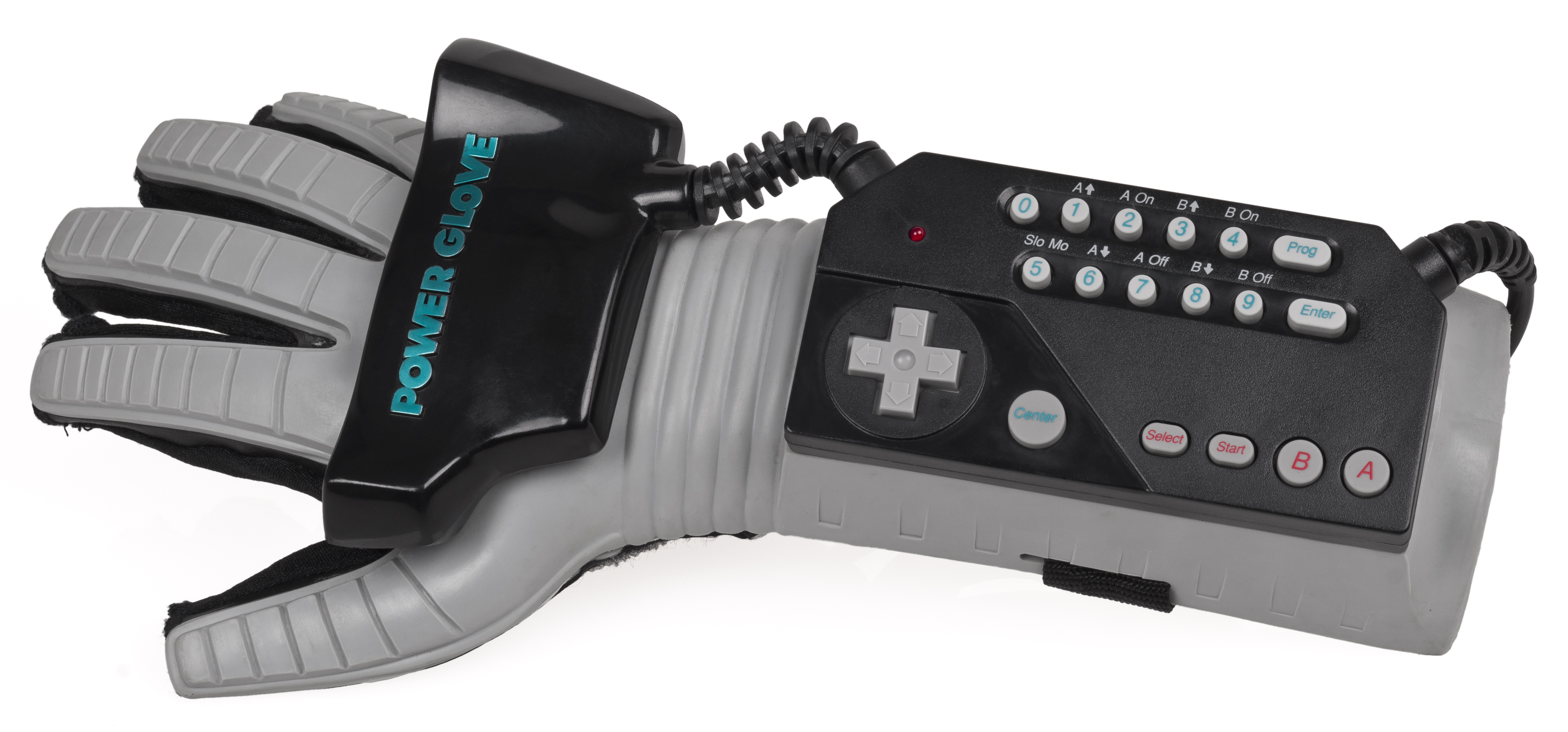
- Power Glove, American model
- Manufacturer: Mattel (United States); PAX (Japan)
- Type: Game controller
- Generation: Third generation era
- Released: NA: October 1989
- Introductory price: US$75 (Equivalent to $194 in 2025)
- Discontinued: 1990
- Controller input: 1 Crosshead A B Action Buttons Start Select Buttons Turbo Buttons
- Connectivity: Serial port
- Backward compatibility: Nintendo Entertainment System

The Power Glove is a controller accessory for the Nintendo Entertainment System. The Power Glove gained public attention due to its early motion control mechanics and significant marketing. However, its two games did not sell well, as it was not packaged with a game, and it was criticized for its imprecise and difficult-to-use controls.

== Development ==
The Power Glove was originally released in 1989. Though it was an officially licensed product, Nintendo was not involved in the design or release of the accessory. It was developed by Abrams/Gentile Entertainment, led by Chris Gentile, together with Mattel, and was made by Mattel in the United States and PAX in Japan. It was based on the DataGlove, which Thomas G. Zimmerman and Jaron Lanier, a virtual reality pioneer, had codeveloped and commercialized at VPL Research. Lanier had made a failed attempt at a similar design for Nintendo earlier. Mattel brought in Image Design and Marketing's Hal Berger and Gary Yamron to develop the raw technology into a functional product. They designed Power Glove over the course of eight weeks. The Power Glove and DataGlove were based on Zimmerman's instrumented glove. Zimmerman built the first prototype that demonstrated finger flex measurement and hand position tracking using a pair of ultrasonic transmitters. His original prototype used optical flex sensors to measure finger bending, which were replaced with less expensive carbon-based flex sensors by the AGE team.

== Design and functionality ==
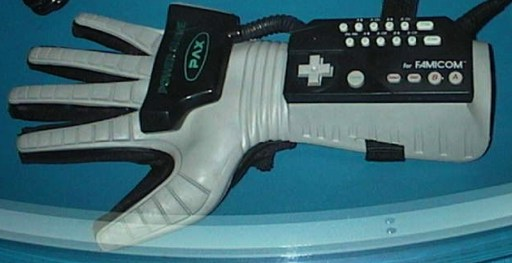
Japanese Power Glove (パワーグローブ Pawā Gurōbu), manufactured by PAX

The Power Glove is based on the patented technology of the VPL Dataglove, but with many modifications that allow it to be used with modestly performing consumer hardware and sold at an affordable price. Whereas the Dataglove can detect yaw, pitch and roll; uses fiberoptic sensors to detect finger flexure; and has a resolution of 256 positions (8 bits) per finger for four fingers (the little finger is not measured to save money, and it usually follows the movement of the ring finger), the Power Glove can only detect roll and uses sensors coated with conductive ink; their analog signal is converted into two bits per finger, yielding a resolution of four positions (2 bits) per finger for four fingers. This allows the Power Glove to store all the finger flexure information in a single byte. The design of the Glove was based on the titular protagonist of the RoboCop franchise.

The glove has traditional NES controller buttons on the forearm, a program button, and buttons labeled 0–9. The user presses the program button and a numbered button to input commands, such as changing the firing rate of the A and B buttons. Along with the controller, the player can perform various hand motions to control a character on screen.

== Games ==
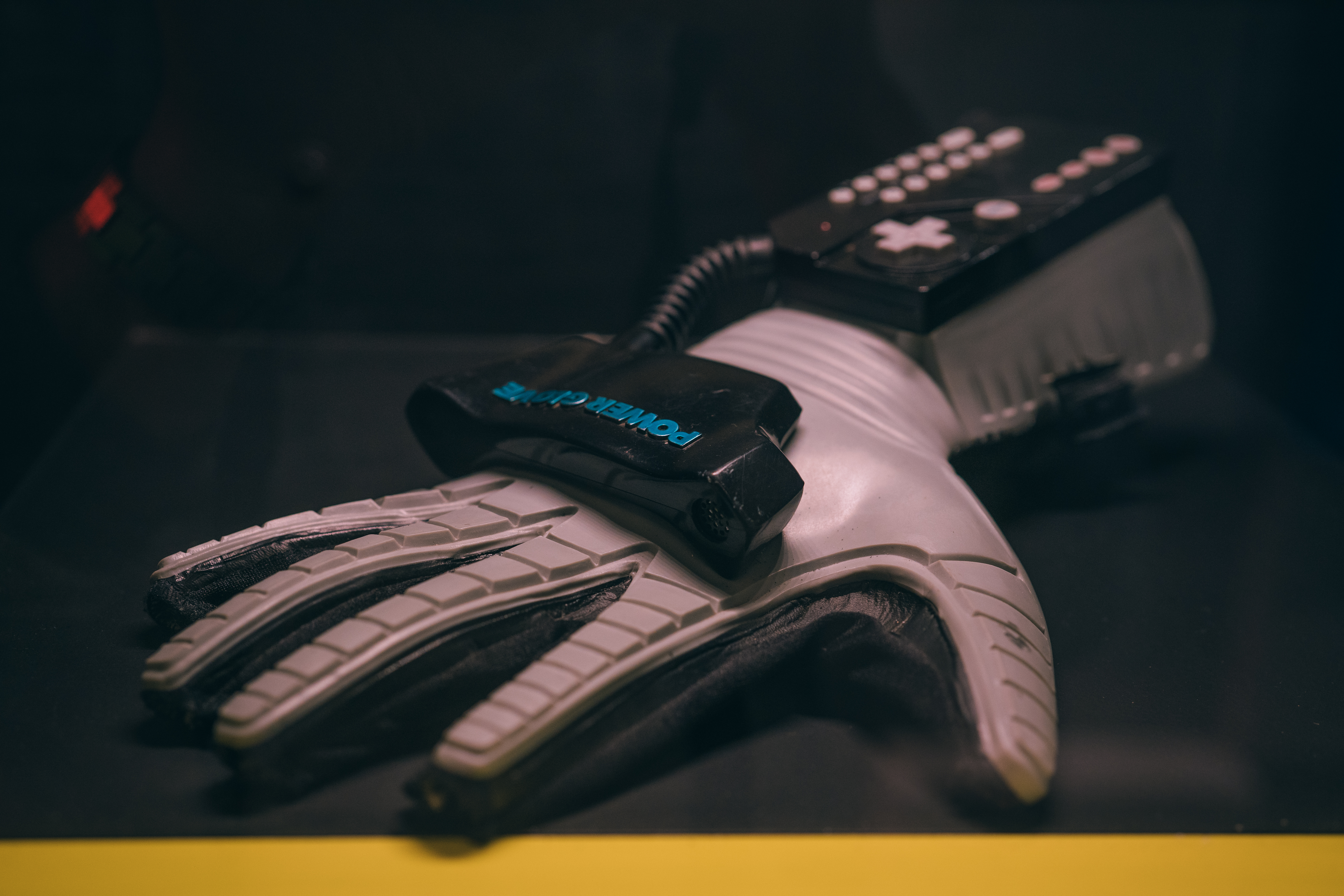
A Power Glove displayed at the Video Game Museum in Berlin, Germany

Two games were released with specific features for use with the Power Glove: Super Glove Ball, a faux-3D puzzle maze game, and Bad Street Brawler, a beat 'em up. Both games are playable with the standard NES controller but include moves that can only be used with the glove. These two games are branded as part of the "Power Glove Gaming Series". Since no Power Glove-specific games ever retailed in Japan, the Power Glove was sold only as an alternative controller.

Two more games, Glove Pilot and Manipulator Glove Adventure, were announced but never released. Another unreleased game, Tech Town or Tektown, is a virtual puzzle solving game in which the player moved a robotic hand around a deserted space station setting, using the glove to open doors and to pick up and use tools. It can be seen in a sneak peek in the Official Power Glove Game Players Gametape.

The Power Glove was adopted by the emerging virtual reality community in the 1990s to interact with 3D worlds in a cheaper way than the popular high end DataGlove produced by VPL Research. REND386 was the bridging shareware software to support it.

== Reception ==
The Power Glove sold nearly one million units and was a commercial success. However, it generally received extremely poor reception because the controls for the glove were incredibly obtuse, making it completely impractical for almost every game on the console. Only two games were specially constructed for the Power Glove, and many users had no practical use for it for playing other noteworthy games of its time. Consumer complaints also noted the poor connection signal between the glove and the console, build quality of the materials, and high price point for 1989 (retail price was $100, approximately $250 in 2024).

== In popular culture ==
The Power Glove is featured in the 1989 film The Wizard, wielded by antagonist Lucas Barton (Jackey Vinson), who infamously declares, "I love the Power Glove – it's so bad." In 2013, a documentary titled The Power of Glove was put into development. The film was released in 2019. The Power Glove is featured in the 2021 movie 8-Bit Christmas, and New York Times writer Calum Marsh describes the Power Glove's "awfulness" as what "sets the [film's] plot in motion".

American metal band Powerglove as well as the Australian electronic duo Power Glove are both named after the device.

The Power Glove is an important accessory for the character Hackerman in the YouTube releases featurette Kung Fury and its planned feature length sequel Kung Fury 2.

The Power Glove is referenced in Andy Weir's sci-fi novel Project Hail Mary.

The Power Glove is also referenced in Freddy's Dead: The Final Nightmare, the sixth film in the Nightmare on Elm Street series.

A parody of The Power Glove, called The Maximum Glove, is featured in "Video Game Wizards", the nineteenth episode of the third season of Cartoon Network's Regular Show.

A parody of The Power Glove, called the Retroglove, appears in the 2013 video game Infilitrating the Airship, and subsequently re-appears in the series' 2020 remaster, The Henry Stickmin Collection.
