= ZeniMax v. Oculus =

Civil lawsuit

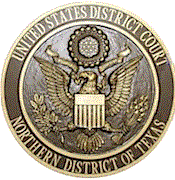
- Court: United States District Court for the Northern District of Texas
- Full case name: ZeniMax Media Inc. et al. v. Oculus VR, Inc. et al.
- Decided: February 2, 2017
- Defendants: Oculus VR, Facebook, Palmer Luckey, Brendan Iribe, John Carmack
- Plaintiffs: ZeniMax Media, id Software
- Citation: N.D. Tex. Civil Case No. 3:14-cv-01849-P

Holding
- Oculus and corporate officers Luckey and Brenden Iribe broke a non-disclosure agreement with ZeniMax. The Oculus Rift product does not use ZeniMax's trade secrets. Jury award to ZeniMax for $500 million.

Court membership
- Judge sitting: James E. Kinkeade

Keywords
- Intellectual property, non-disclosure agreement

ZeniMax v. Oculus is a civil lawsuit filed by ZeniMax Media against Oculus VR on charges of theft of intellectual property relating to Oculus' virtual reality device, the Oculus Rift. The matter was settled with a private out-of-court agreement by December 2018.

== Background ==
The Oculus Rift is a virtual reality headset that was developed by Oculus VR. The company was founded by Palmer Luckey, who had a keen interest in head-mounted displays and had developed a prototype of the Oculus Rift by 2012. Concurrently, John Carmack, at the time of id Software, a subsidiary under ZeniMax Media, also was interested in head-mounted displays, saw Luckey's prototype for the Rift and modified it, showcasing the updated prototype at Electronic Entertainment Expo 2012 (E3) that June using a modified version of id's Doom 3.

Following E3 2012, Oculus VR launched a Kickstarter to fund further development of the Rift, ultimately raising more than $2.4 million (~$3.23 million in 2024) through it, one of the largest crowdfunding ventures at that time. The attention led to additional venture funding, with more than $91 million (~$120 million in 2024) invested by 2013. During this, Carmack left id Software to become the Chief Technology Officer for Oculus VR. In March 2014, Mark Zuckerberg announced that Facebook had acquired Oculus VR for $2 billion (~$2.6 billion in 2024).

== Filings ==
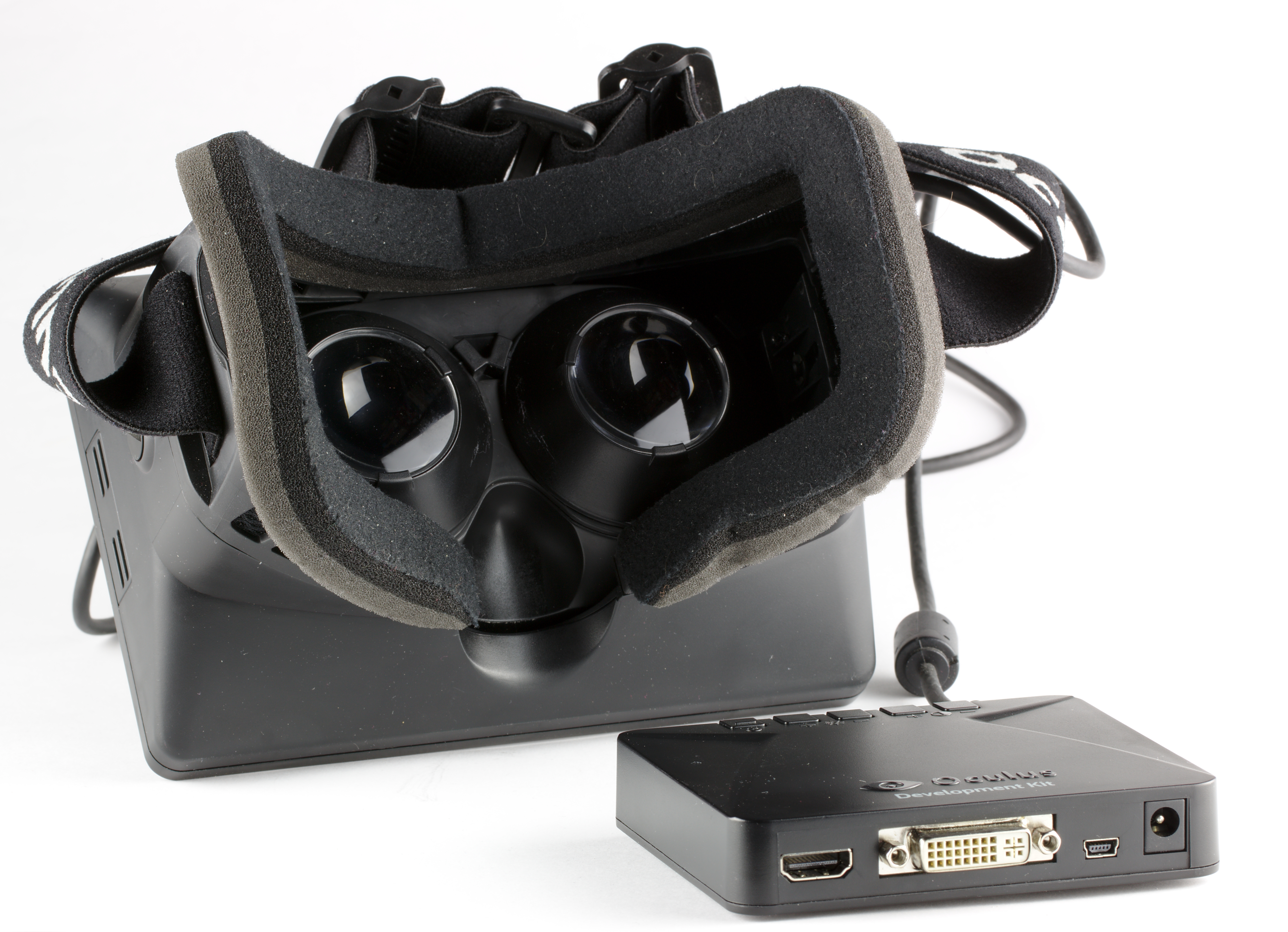
The Oculus Rift "Development Kit 1" headset, developed from the 2013 Kickstarter funding

Around May 2014, shortly after Facebook made its deal to acquire Oculus VR, the Wall Street Journal reported that ZeniMax had sent two letters to Facebook and Oculus VR, asserting that any technology contributions Carmack had made towards VR while he was still an employee of id Software, including the "VR testbed" that Carmack had frequently demonstrated, were within the intellectual property (IP) of id and ZeniMax. In a statement, ZeniMax said that they "provided necessary VR technology and other valuable assistance to Palmer Luckey and other Oculus employees in 2012 and 2013 to make the Oculus Rift a viable VR product, superior to other VR market offerings."

ZeniMax stated that a 2012 non-disclosure agreement (NDA) and a non-ownership agreement that covered VR technology and signed by Luckey, prior to Oculus VR's formation, would cover any of Carmack's contributions to VR.

ZeniMax contended that they had attempted to resolve these issues with Oculus prior to their acquisition by Facebook "whereby ZeniMax would be compensated for its intellectual property through equity ownership in Oculus but were unable to reach a satisfactory resolution". Oculus denied the claims, stating that "It's unfortunate, but when there's this type of transaction, people come out of the woodwork with ridiculous and absurd claims".

ZeniMax formally filed a lawsuit against Luckey and Oculus VR on May 21, 2014 in the United States District Court for the Northern District of Texas and seeking a jury trial. The lawsuit contended that Luckey and Oculus used ZeniMax's "trade secrets, copyrighted computer code, and technical know-how relating to virtual reality technology", as provided by Carmack, to develop the Oculus Rift product, and sought for financial damages for contract breach, copyright infringement, and unfair competition. ZeniMax also charged that Oculus, through Carmack, were able to hire several former ZeniMax/id Software employees who also had technical knowledge of its VR technology, which would allow them to rapidly fine-tune the VR testbed system to create the Rift. In its filings, ZeniMax revealed it had "invested tens of millions of dollars in research and development" into VR technology, and that because they felt "Oculus and Luckey lacked the necessary expertise and technical know-how to create a viable virtual reality headset", they "sought expertise and know-how from Zenimax".

Oculus' initial response to the charges was that "The lawsuit filed by ZeniMax has no merit whatsoever. As we have previously said, ZeniMax did not contribute to any Oculus technology. Oculus will defend these claims vigorously." The company filed its formal response on June 25, 2014, stating that ZeniMax "falsely claims ownership in Oculus VR technology in a transparent attempt to take advantage of the Oculus VR sale to Facebook". Oculus stated that prior to the acquisition by Facebook, "ZeniMax never raised any claim of infringement against Oculus VR, undoubtedly because ZeniMax never has contributed any intellectual property or technology to Oculus VR".

The response stated that ZeniMax's filing was "deliberately misstating some facts and omitting others" and that "there is not a line of ZeniMax code or any of its technology in any Oculus VR product". Oculus' response included photographs and documents that demonstrated they had been working on their own VR technology as early as August 2010. The response further contended that the key document of ZeniMax's suit, the NDA signed by Luckey, was "never finalized", and thus is not a "valid and enforceable agreement".

ZeniMax amended the case to include Facebook among the defendants on August 29, 2014. ZeniMax charged that Facebook intended to "leverage and commercially exploit Oculus's virtual reality technology — which is built upon ZeniMax's unlawfully misappropriated intellectual property — for the financial benefit of Facebook's core business of online social networking and advertising."

Oculus and Facebook attempted to have the case dismissed, but the presiding judge disagreed, and, in August 2015, allowed the case to proceed to a jury trial that started in August 2016.

== District Court trial ==
During the discovery phase, ZeniMax sought a deposition from Zuckerberg, believing he had "unique knowledge" of the Facebook-Oculus deal. Following a request from Facebook, the judge ruled that Zuckerberg must provide a deposition, but only after lesser-ranking employees had been deposed as to have a "less intrusive discovery" process.

In August 2016, it was discovered that ZeniMax had further modified their complaint, specifically adding by name Carmack as Oculus's CTO, and Brendan Iribe as Oculus' CEO. The updated complaint alleged that during his last days at id Software, Carmack "copied thousands of documents from a computer at ZeniMax to a USB storage device", and later after his employment was terminated he "returned to ZeniMax's premises to take a customized tool for developing VR Technology belonging to ZeniMax that itself is part of ZeniMax's VR technology". ZeniMax's complaint charged that Iribe had directed Oculus to "[disseminate] to the press the false and fanciful story that Luckey was the brilliant inventor of VR technology who had developed that technology in his parents' garage", when "Luckey lacked the training, expertise, resources, or know-how to create commercially viable VR technology", thus aiding in the IP theft from ZeniMax.

Further, the updated complaint asserted Facebook knew or had reason to know that Oculus' claims on the VR IP was false. Oculus responded, "This complaint filed by ZeniMax is one-sided and conveys only ZeniMax's interpretation of the story". The court had a computer forensic expert evaluate the contents of Carmack's computer, and on October 28, 2016, the expert reported that from their findings "statements and representations that have been sworn to and are before the court are factually inaccurate". The court ordered Oculus to comply with providing previously-redacted communications it had with Carmack as a result, as well as requesting Samsung to provide information on its Samsung Gear VR which was co-created with Oculus.

The jury trial started on January 9, 2017. During the trial, Zuckerberg testified in court that he believed the allegations from ZeniMax Media were false. In the plaintiff's closing arguments, ZeniMax's lawyers requested $2 billion in compensation for Oculus' actions, and an additional $4 billion in punitive damages.

=== Decision ===
The jury trial concluded on February 2, 2017, with the jury finding that Luckey had violated the NDA he had with ZeniMax, and awarding $500 million (~$627 million in 2024) to ZeniMax. However, the jury found that Oculus, Facebook, Luckey, Iribe, and Carmack did not misappropriate or steal trade secrets, though ZeniMax continued to publicly assert otherwise. Oculus was ordered to pay $200 million for breaking the non-disclosure agreement, and an additional $50 million for copyright infringement; for the false designation of origin charges, Oculus and Luckey were ordered to pay $50 million each, while Iribe would be responsible for $150 million.

== Appeals and additional actions ==
While Oculus said "the jury found decisively in our favor" over the issue of trade secrets, the company planned to file an appeal on the other charges. Carmack stated that he disagreed with the decision, particularly on ZeniMax's "characterization, misdirection, and selective omissions" regarding his behavior, adding that he had accounted for all the data in his possession. Carmack took issue with one of ZeniMax's expert witnesses who testified that non-literal copying, the act of creating a program with similar functions but using different computer code, constitutes a copyright violation.

ZeniMax stated that it was considering filing for a court-ordered halt to all Oculus Rift units in light of the jury decision; and on February 24, 2017, filed an injunction to have the court halt sales of the Oculus Rift and development kits. Oral arguments for these injunctions were held on June 19, 2017. ZeniMax argued that either Oculus should halt sales of the Rift, or otherwise receive 20% of all Rift sales over the next ten years. Oculus, in addition to its own filings towards a new trial, requested the judge throw out the jury verdict, or reduced the penalty to $50 million. In June 2018, the judge overseeing the case agreed to cut the damages owed by Oculus in half to US$250 million (with an additional US$54 million in interest), while denying ZeniMax their request to halt Oculus sales.

By December 2018, ZeniMax stated they had reached a settlement agreement with Facebook and Oculus for an undisclosed amount, pending approval by the federal court.

== Other lawsuits ==
In a separate lawsuit filed in March 2017, Carmack asserted that ZeniMax did not complete its payment to him of the acquisition of id Software, and asked the court to find for him for the remaining $22 million (~$27.6 million in 2024) he states the company owes him. ZeniMax's lawyers asserted that from the Oculus case, they had not been found in violation of Carmack's employment after ZeniMax acquired id Software and that this new suit was "without merit". By October 2018, Carmack stated that he and ZeniMax reached an agreement and that "Zenimax has fully satisfied their obligations to me", and this lawsuit was subsequently dropped.

In May 2017, ZeniMax filed a new lawsuit towards Samsung over the Gear VR. In addition to the previous legal decision over IP issues related to the Oculus technology used in the Gear VR, ZeniMax also contends in the new suit that Carmack had allowed Matt Hooper, who had been recently fired as a creative director from id, into id's facilities after hours without permission to work out an "attack plan" for developing mobile VR, which would ultimately lead to the Gear VR device. ZeniMax seeks punitive damages as well as a share of profits from Gear VR.
