= Super Glove Ball =

1990 video game

- Cover art
- Developer: Rare
- Publisher: Mattel
- Designer: Novak
- Composer: David Wise
- Platform: Nintendo Entertainment System
- Release: NA: October 1990
- Genre: Action
- Mode: Single player

Super Glove Ball is a game made by Rare in 1990 for the Nintendo Entertainment System, specifically designed to be played with the Power Glove controller. However, it can also be played with a standard NES controller. It was sold separately from the Power Glove.

== Gameplay ==
Proceeding through the first maze of the game

This video game uses a first-person perspective to provide a three-dimensional element. There are three different mazes in the game; each maze holds hundreds of different rooms.

In Super Glove Ball, the player controls a virtual glove on-screen. The player has a life meter that is divided into 26 bars. The player starts off in a 3D room, and each surface of the room has rectangular tiles on it. The left and right walls of the room each have 20 tiles on their surfaces (5 tiles high and 4 tiles deep). The top and bottom walls each have 32 tiles (8 tiles wide and 4 tiles deep). The wall at the far end of the room has 40 tiles (8 tiles wide and 5 tiles high).

Energy balls appear and fly around the room, bouncing off of the walls, somewhat like the game of squash. When the ball hits a tile on a wall, that tile is destroyed. The player must keep the ball in play and destroy the tiles by hitting, throwing, and punching the ball around the room. The player cannot let the ball go behind the glove; if this happens, it will be destroyed, and a new one will appear. If the player loses 5 balls, a life will be lost. When all lives have been lost, it's game over, and there are no continues. The player also has a finite number of Robo-Bullets that the glove can shoot out of its index finger by pressing the "select" button. These can destroy tiles with one hit, and they can also be used to attack enemies.

When all of the tiles on a wall have been destroyed, either nothing will happen, or a red arrow will appear, and it will point in the direction of the wall that the player has just cleared, indicating that the glove can now pass through that wall and go on to another room in the maze. Each room in the maze has a number, so it is advantageous for the player to make a map of the maze when going along. The second world alone has over 60 rooms, so without a map, it can be frustrating and easy to get lost. Making a map is practically half the fun of the game, which is more of exploration than anything else.

Some of the tiles will have a question mark on them. If the player hits a question mark tile with either the energy ball or by shooting it with a Robo-Bullet, one of several bonus power-ups will be awarded:

- LIFE: The player gets an extra life. They are quite rare.
- EXTRA: The player gets an extra ball.
- ICE BALL: Slows down enemies.
- BOMB BALL: The ball will do more damage to enemies. Also, if the player holds onto the ball when the bomb bonus is in effect, it will blow up in the glove, making the player lose a life.
- POWER: Refills the life meter.
- ROW: If the ball hits a tile, all of the tiles in that row will also be destroyed. The effect lasts for a limited time. This is the best power-up to have to move to another room quickly. It seems to be random in terms of whether the row that gets cleared will be vertical or horizontal.
- SUPER BALL: Causes the energy ball to fly around the room at a super-high speed for a limited time. The super ball will also bounce off of the invisible back wall of the room, leaving the player free to do other things, like attack enemies or shoot tiles with Robo-Bullets.
- TRIPLE: Causes two other balls to appear in addition to the one that was already in play.
- ROBO-BULLET REFILL: Gives 30 extra Robo-Bullets. The player starts off with 40, and can have a maximum of 99.
- PINBALL: Causes a specially colored tile to move amongst the tiles on the far wall of the room for a limited time. If the player hits the specially colored tile with an energy ball, all possible pathways to neighboring rooms will be opened, regardless of which tiles have been destroyed.

The game has three worlds, and they get progressively more difficult. The enemies get tougher (some will make the player lose a life with only one hit), and there are more ways for the player to lose the ball. Certain tiles are also much harder to hit in the second and third worlds.

One of the biggest criticisms in Super Glove Ball is that in certain rooms, the game will randomly warp the player to another random room.

The game also features a high score list, which is reset every time the system is turned off.

== Plot ==
Set in the then-futuristic year 2005, the story line is that the player's shuttle commander has been trapped in a dimensional maze in outer space. Only he can rescue the commander by throwing energy balls at the walls. Four different types of energy balls can be used; effects range from slowing down the opponent to killing them outright.
