= Aubrey Hodges =

- Genres: Electronic, soundtrack, dark ambient
- Occupations: Composer, sound designer, arranger
- Years active: 1985–present
- Website: aubreyhodges.com

Aubrey Hodges is an American composer, musician, multi-instrumentalist and video game music composer. He began his professional audio career in 1985 and has composed music and sound effects for the video game industry since 1991. He has worked on series including King's Quest, Space Quest, Quest for Glory, PlayStation versions of Doom, Doom 64, and Nintendo 64 versions of Quake and Quake II.

Hodges plays a multitude of instruments, from stringed to brass to percussion, and works in a variety of styles. He also composes and records independent albums under his own name.

== Credits ==
=== Video games ===
Aubrey Hodges has contributed to over 200 games, including:

Video games
Title	Year	System(s)	Notes
Roberta Williams' Mixed-Up Mother Goose	1991	MS-DOS, FM Towns, Windows	Sound effects
EcoQuest: The Search for Cetus	1991	MS-DOS, Windows	Sound effects
Conquests of the Longbow: The Legend of Robin Hood	1991	MS-DOS	Sound effects
Quest for Glory I: So You Want To Be A Hero	1992	MS-DOS	Sound effects
The Shadow of Yserbius	1993	MS-DOS	With Russell Lieblich
Quest for Glory: Shadows of Darkness	1993	MS-DOS	
Hoyle Classic Card Games	1993	MS-DOS	
Freddy Pharkas: Frontier Pharmacist	1993	MS-DOS	
Kyle Petty's No Fear Racing	1995	SNES	
Fun 'n Games	1995	3DO	
Doom	1995	PlayStation, Sega Saturn	
Final Doom	1996	PlayStation	
Robotron X	1996	PlayStation	
Doom 64	1997	Nintendo 64	
Robotron 64	1997	Nintendo 64	
Quake	1998	Nintendo 64	
NFL Blitz	1998	Arcade, Nintendo 64, PlayStation, Windows	Video/Audio Editing
Bio F.R.E.A.K.S.	1998	PlayStation, Nintendo 64	
Ready 2 Rumble Boxing	1999	PlayStation, Nintendo 64	Design Team
Quake II	1999	Nintendo 64	Credited as Ken "Razor" Richmond
Rampage 2: Universal Tour	1999	Nintendo 64	
Offroad Thunder	1999	Arcade, PlayStation 2, Xbox, Nintendo GameCube	With Dale Stump
Quake III Arena	2000	Dreamcast	With Dale Stump
Ready 2 Rumble Boxing: Round 2	2000	Nintendo 64	Music Development Manager
NBA Hoopz	2001	Dreamcast, PlayStation, PlayStation 2	Special Thanks
Spy Hunter	2001	PlayStation, GameCube, Xbox, Microsoft Windows, OS X	Music Development Manager
Legion: The Legend of Excalibur	2002	PlayStation 2	Music Development Manager, FMV Audio Editing
Haven: Call of the King	2002	PlayStation 2	Dialogue Editing, Audio Director
Fire Blade	2002	PlayStation 2, GameCube, Xbox	Speech, Music Development Manager
NASCAR Thunder 2004	2003	PlayStation, PlayStation 2, Windows, Xbox	Supporting Audio
Freaky Flyers	2003	PlayStation 2, GameCube, Xbox	Additional thanks, FMV Voices
NCAA Football 2004	2003	PlayStation 2, GameCube, Xbox	Audio Support
Madden NFL 2004	2003	PlayStation 2, GameCube, Xbox	Additional Audio Support
NASCAR 2005: Chase for the Cup	2004	PlayStation 2, GameCube, Xbox	Audio Director
Madden NFL 2005	2004	GameCube, PlayStation 2, Windows, Xbox	Audio Director
Madden NFL 06	2005	GameCube, PlayStation 2, Windows, Xbox	Audio Director
NASCAR SimRacing	2005	Windows	Audio Director
NASCAR 06: Total Team Control	2006	PlayStation 2, Xbox	Audio Director
Arena Football	2006	PlayStation 2, Xbox	Audio Director
Superman Returns	2006	PlayStation 2, Xbox, Xbox 360	Audio Director
NCAA Football 07	2006	PlayStation 2, PSP, Xbox, Xbox 360	Audio Director
NFL Street 3	2006	PlayStation 2, PSP	Audio Director
Tiger Woods PGA Tour 08	2007	Macintosh, PlayStation 2, PlayStation 3, Wii, Windows, Xbox 360	Audio Director
NASCAR 08	2007	PlayStation 2, PlayStation 3, Xbox 360	Audio Director
Madden NFL 08	2007	GameCube, Macintosh, PlayStation 2, Wii, Windows, Xbox	Audio Director
NFL Head Coach 09	2008	PlayStation 3, Xbox 360	Audio Director
NASCAR 09	2008	PlayStation 2, PlayStation 3, Xbox 360	Audio Director
Madden NFL 09	2008	PlayStation 2, Xbox	Audio Director
Henry Hatsworth in the Puzzling Adventure	2008	Nintendo DS	Performed guitar and vocals
NinJump	2010	Android, iPad, iPhone	
Army of Darkness: Defense	2011	iPhone	
Dragonvale	2011	Android, iPhone	
Madden NFL Football	2011	Nintendo 3DS	
Paper Toss Friends	2012	iPad, iPhone	Sound design
Fieldrunners	2012	Windows	Audio
NinJump Deluxe	2012	Android, iPad, iPhone, Mac	
Spellfall	2014	Android	
Halo: The Master Chief Collection	2019	Windows, Xbox One	Special thanks
Gears Tactics	2020	Windows	Additional audio, with Lewis Gregory Williams and Matteo Cerquone
Doom Eternal	2020	PlayStation 4, Stadia, Windows, Xbox One	Poster tracks
Immortals of Aveum	2023	PlayStation 5, Xbox Series, Windows	Audio director, composer

=== Voice acting ===
Title	Role(s)
Fire Blade	Additional voices
Legion: The Legend of Excalibur	Additional voices
Haven: Call of the King	Will, Chamber Of Ruin Blind Man, Henchman, Guard 2
Freaky Flyers	Soldier, Newsreels

=== Other work ===
Year	Title	Notes
2012	Journey into the Dark Places	
2012	Refelctions of Veldra	
2013	Journey into the Sacred Places	
2013	Free Stuffs: Volume 1	
2014	Above All the Thorns	With Mattie Mills
2017	The SynthBots: Beethoven Quartets Vol I	With John Hodges
2018	Journey into the Dark Places: Vol. 2	
