= Empire Earth: The Art of Conquest =

2002 video game

- PC box cover
- Developer: Mad Doc Software
- Publisher: Sierra Entertainment
- Designer: Ian Lane Davis
- Series: Empire Earth
- Engine: Titan
- Platform: Windows
- Release: NA: September 17, 2002; EU: October 4, 2002; AU: October 21, 2002
- Genre: Real-time strategy
- Modes: Single-player, multiplayer

Empire Earth: The Art of Conquest is the expansion pack for the real-time strategy game Empire Earth. Art of Conquest was published by Sierra Entertainment like with the original game, but was instead developed by Mad Doc Software. It was released on September 17, 2002, in the United States. The game was released the following month in Europe and Australia, and the following year in Japan. The Gold Edition of Empire Earth, which features both the original and the expansion, was released on May 6, 2003.

Art of Conquest added several new features to the original Empire Earth, including units, civilizations (Japan and Korea), civilization powers, and hero units. Art of Conquest also features three new campaigns: Ancient Rome, World War II, and 23rd century Mars. The game received mixed reviews, averaging 66% on GameRankings.

== Gameplay ==
Unit relationship diagram between space and land units.

The gameplay in Art of Conquest is the same as in the original Empire Earth, albeit with some changes. Variable difficulty has been added to those scenarios which had not received it in a patch of the original Empire Earth. Online multiplayer capabilities has been added, allowing players to play online with up to seven other players either over the Internet via a lobby system, or over a local area network (LAN).

The new Space Age (Epoch XV) allows the building of spaceports and spaceships on maps that allow it. Robots replace Citizens in the Nano Age and infantry in the Space Age (these robots are known as Watchmen). Nano age Farms are run by robots, and by the Space Age farms no longer need citizens to manage them. Each civilization has its own power, or "Civ Power". Often, these powers are only available during certain epochs. A Civ Power gives each nation a specialty: the Chinese, for example, have the "just-in-time manufacturing" ability; while the Japanese have the "cyber ninja" ability.

Empire Earth supports multiplayer over LAN connections and online. Multiplayer games are identical in form to single-player games. Art of Conquest multiplayer play has many exploits, which players can use to give themselves an unfair advantage. The game's publisher, Vivendi Games, has set up forums where players can report exploits. The multiplayer servers were taken offline on November 1, 2008; players are only able to play through local area network and Direct IP.

== Campaigns ==
Three new campaigns were added in The Art of Conquest: an Ancient Roman campaign about Gaius Marius and Julius Caesar, a campaign involving the warfare in the Pacific Ocean during World War II, and a futuristic Asian campaign involving the colonization of Mars.

=== Roman Campaign ===
The Roman campaign revolves around the struggles of Marius and the conquests of Julius Caesar. The campaign comprises six distinct scenarios.

The first scenario begins in the late Roman Republic. The player, as Gaius Marius, can conscript citizens and must defeat the combined threat of a Teutonic horde and a Cimbri invasion force into Italy in 102-101 BC.

The second scenario moves the story into an alternate reality where Gaius Marius must flee from Lucius Cornelius Sulla into Carthage and then defeat Jugurthian bandits in order to gain the support of the Carthaginian Senate (War elephants and naval transport ships). Afterwards, the player must achieve victory by killing Sulla's loyal senators and liberating Rome from his Dictatorship.

The third scenario covers Caesar's exile into Greece and Asia Minor where he gets help avoiding capture from Greek bounty hunters by a Pirate King on Crete. In Asia Minor he must help the King of Bythnia against rebels who have taken over Mytilene in Lesbos. The scenario ends with a showdown against Sulla's eastern Legion in Thracia.

The fourth scenario depicts Julius Caesar's conquest of Gaul and the invasion of Britain. The player starts in the Roman province of Hispania (modern Spain). There he must collect and deliver a large amount of resources within a certain time in order to pay Marcus Crassus for his support in Rome while fighting off local barbarians. The scenario continues with the migrating Helvetii trying to aggressively settle down in Hispania by crossing the Pyrenees mountains. After defeating the Helvetti, the player must lead his army into Gaul and subdue the various Gallic tribes, including the Ambrones, Belgians, and Suebi. Then, he must cross the English Channel and defeat the Celts in Britain.

The fifth scenario follows Caesar's war with his former ally and friend Pompey. This scenario starts with the famous crossing of the Rubicon, his conquest of Italy, and the short Greek campaign which ends at the battle of Pharsalus.

The final scenario details his conquest of Ptolemaic Egypt, where he must choose which side to help; Cleopatra VII or Ptolemy XIV. Both have differing objectives and situations:

Helping Cleopatra VII gives Caesar control of the large city of Alexandria, where he starts in. He must then hold off Ptolemy XIV's forces and prevent them from capturing town centers inside the city while trying to destroy Ptolemy's desert camps outside the city.

Helping Ptolemy XIV is dangerous as Caesar and his army must move quickly to escape from Alexandria or risk being overwhelmed by Cleopatra's forces. He must then regroup outside in one of Ptolemy's camps in the desert and then capture the Town Centers inside the city in order to achieve victory.

If the player chooses to help Cleopatra, Ptolemy will (after a certain amount of time) send soldiers towards the Great Pyramid of Cheops and try to make it lose half its hitpoints. If they succeed, the player is defeated and must then load a saved game (although a script bug allows the player to destroy the pyramid by simply selecting it and pressing delete without being defeated, thus permanently preventing Ptolemy from damaging an already destroyed building).

=== Pacific Campaign ===
The Pacific campaign comprises six distinct scenarios. The opening scenario lets the player control the Battle of Midway. This scenario concludes with the sinking of Japanese aircraft carriers Akagi, Sōryū, Kaga, and Hiryū. Then the story covers the Battle of Guadalcanal in 1943, and later the island-hopping campaign directed by Douglas MacArthur which involves killing Admiral Isoroku Yamamoto. The next scenarios include a special mission in Burma, the Battle for Leyte Gulf, and the reconquest of Leyte. The story concludes with the Battle of Iwo Jima, which is the shortest scenario in the game. It is completed by sending five Marines to the southern tip of the Island. This refers to the famous image of US Marines raising the flag of the United States at Mount Suribachi. See Raising the Flag on Iwo Jima

=== Asian Campaign ===
A game taking place on Mars

This campaign is told from the perspective of the Kwan Do family, an influential family who claim to be descendants of the Qin dynasty, and is split into two parts. Part One details the colonization of Mars. As soon as it is discovered that it is possible to colonize Mars, the major superpowers of Earth scramble to develop the technologies and resources needed to establish settlements. One of these powers is the newly formed United Federation of Asian Republics (UFAR), founded and ultimately controlled by the Kwan Do family. The Kwan Do family are the rich owners of Kwan Do Electronics and Communications. The UFAR government struggles to suppress local rebellions and terrorist activities by the Eye of God, an extremist organization who claim that Earth should be the only home to mankind. Meanwhile, the UFAR also struggles to develop a colonial programme competing against rival superpowers. A UFAR colony on Mars is eventually built, with help from Japan, alongside settlements built by the US-Canadian Conglomerate, the European Union of Nations, Novaya Russia, and the Republic of Japan. With these colonies established, Mars is divided into five regions. Part Two is set 250 years after the first part, during the Space Age Epoch. The Kwan Do dynasty has been overthrown, and harsh conditions on Mars and an increasingly negative perception of the Earth governments have finally forced the Martian colonists into rebellion. During the revolutions, Khan Sun Do, a descendant of the Kwan Do family, unites the five territories. With the acquisition of Space Battleship Yamato, the Martians fight an inter-planetary war against Earth to secure their independence. The campaign ends with the last battle for Martian independence and the installation of Khan Sun Do as the first leader of Mars.

== Development and release ==
The Art of Conquest expansion pack for Empire Earth was announced in May 2002 by Sierra (the game's original publisher, later taken over by Vivendi). The development of the game was turned over to Mad Doc Software from Stainless Steel Studios because Stainless Steel were already working on Empires: Dawn of the Modern World. According to Steve Beinner, the brand manager of the Empire Earth series, Empire Earth's expansion pack was planned even before the original game was released. The developers listened to feedback from the game community and planned the new features and release schedule accordingly. In an interview with IGN.com, Steve Beinner said "People were asking for additional scenarios and extra units. That's based upon surveys we did and distributors on a worldwide basis."

Work on Art of Conquest began in early 2002, with a planned release date later that same year. The developers decided "the game won't be present at E3 (Electronic Entertainment Expo), because of the tight development schedule and the fact that Sierra didn't want the developers to be distracted by creating an E3 demo." Beta testing for Art of Conquest began on August 5, 2002, and consisted of a single multiplayer map that could be played through all 15 of the expansion pack's ages, allowing players to try out all the new features of the game. Art of Conquest was included in the release of the Empire Earth Gold Edition, which was a re-release of both Empire Earth and Art of Conquest.

== Reception ==
Review scores
Publication	Score
IGN	7.8 of 10
GameSpy	4.5 of 5
GameSpot	5.2 of 10
PC Gamer	85%
Computer Gaming World	2 of 5

The overall reception of Art of Conquest was lukewarm. GameRankings averaged it at 66%, and Metacritic averaged it slightly lower, at 63%. IGN, who gave it a 7.8 out of 10, stated "While it's a solid game, there's just not enough here to compel me to reawaken the substantial addiction the first game generated. Whether or not it's worth it for you to pick this one up depends almost entirely on how much you enjoyed the original game. With so few significant changes it plays almost exactly the same. For those who couldn't get enough of Empire Earth, the expansion should be a perfect fit. Just don't expect the breadth and scope of the first game." Finally, GameSpot gave it a 5.2 out of 10, and said "Ultimately, The Art of Conquest doesn't add enough to make much of a difference." A notable criticism from GameSpot was regarding the way Space was implemented in the game. Spaceships were only available on certain maps and the gameplay was very similar to water—a dock-type building is built and spaceships travel much like naval ships. Other reviewers found fault with the game's price of US$30. The IGN reviewer said "I like Art of Conquest enough but it just falls short of being worth the $30 price tag."

Art of Conquest's music was never released as a soundtrack CD, but the music in the game received critical approval, receiving 7 out of 10 from GameSpot. IGN described the sound as "convincing enough, with realistic battle noises throughout the game's various ages. Each type of attack makes a particular sound and, after a while, you can develop a good sense of the scope of a given battle just by listening to it". IGN gave the sound 7 out of 10 overall, but did have some criticism, remarking that "A few glitches detract from an otherwise sufficient soundtrack. Voices are decent and the music is good. On Monday November 3, 2008, at 7pm GMT, the WON servers, dedicated to the Empire Earth and Empire Earth: The Art of Conquest online game-play system, were permanently shut down by Activision.

In France, the game sold 50,000 units by March 2005.
