= Empire Earth (video game) =

2001 video game

- Developer: Stainless Steel Studios
- Publisher: Sierra On-Line
- Designers: Rick Goodman; Jon Alenson
- Composers: Ed Lima; Steve Maitland
- Series: Empire Earth
- Engine: Titan
- Platform: Windows
- Release: US: November 13, 2001; WW: November 16, 2001
- Genre: Real-time strategy
- Modes: Single-player, multiplayer

Empire Earth is a real-time strategy video game developed by Stainless Steel Studios and released on November 13, 2001. It is the first game in the Empire Earth series.

The game requires players to collect resources to construct buildings, produce citizens, and conquer opposing civilizations. Empire Earth spans 500,000 years of human history, which is divided into 14 epochs, beginning with the prehistoric age, and ending with the nano age.

An expansion pack, Empire Earth: The Art of Conquest, was developed by Mad Doc Software and released in 2002. It added new features such as a special power for each civilization, and a new 15th epoch, entitled the Space Age, which focuses on the colonization of space planets.

== Gameplay ==
Empire Earth is a history-based real-time strategy game. Empire Earth uses 3D graphics. The game itself contains many unique and innovative features, including a "morale" system, which directly affects individual units' statistics. It also incorporates a "hero" system. These can be built at the town center or capital. There are two types of heroes, Strategist heroes who heal surrounding units and can demoralize enemy units while Warrior heroes give morale to surrounding units and have greater attack power. The player has the option of creating their own civilization with unique bonuses. Empire Earth has a map editor included.

Epochs are the ages a player passes through in Empire Earth. Each of these epochs represents an age within history. In Empire Earth, the last two ages (Digital and Nano Ages) are set into the moderate future (at the time of release in 2001). In the Art of Conquest, a third future age, the Space Age, is available. It deals with space colonization. Each epoch brings new technologies and units. Epoch advancement requires additional buildings to be built and the costs of advancing increases as more epochs are attained, although the ability to gather the required resources greatly increases as well. With new epochs, some new units are available at the cost of having to abandon the ability to produce old units, though any old units still alive are kept. The epochs in Empire Earth are the Prehistoric Age, the Stone Age, the Copper Age, the Bronze Age, the Dark Age, the Middle Ages, the Renaissance, the Imperial age, the Industrial age, the Atomic World War I age, the Atomic World War II Age, the Atomic Modern Age, the Digital Age, and the Nano Age. An extra epoch, the Space Age, is available in Empire Earth: The Art of Conquest.

Several different units are available in each epoch, each being produced in a different building. Some units such as infantry are available in every epoch and can be created at the barracks. Other units such as archers are available from the Stone Age to the Renaissance and are created at archery ranges. Horsemen are available from the Copper Age to the Industrial Age and are created at stables. Siege weapons such as catapults are produced at siege factories, they are available starting from the Bronze Age until the Dark Ages and are later substituted by the trebuchet in the Middle Ages throughout the Imperial age, finally being replaced by cannons in the Renaissance. In the Atomic Age-World War I epoch some new buildings are made available to the player, such as airports, tank factories, and naval yards where certain planes, tanks, and submarines, etc. can be produced. In the Digital age Cyber Factories and Laboratories are available and can produce many types of robots, referred to as "Cybers".

Like many real-time strategy games, there are technologies available to improve a player's civilization. Technologies to improve farming can be researched at the granary. Health-related technologies can be researched at a hospital. Technologies researched at the hospital improve the hit points, speed, and attack of a civilization's citizens, a hospital's healing rate and range, or the population capacity. Education upgrades are found in the university, which can protect units from being converted. Economic upgrades are found in the town center or capitol. These upgrades will increase the rate at which resources are gathered.

After the Prehistoric Age, units such as naval units can be built. Shown here are; Galley (left middle), Frigate (lower middle), Battleship (top), and Cruiser (upper middle) which are the main ships until galleys are replaced by submarines in the Atomic Age. Cruisers are available from the Imperial Age.

Empire Earth has 21 civilizations, (with two additional ones in The Art of Conquest). Civilizations are predetermined in scenarios but chosen by the player shortly after the beginning of random map games. Each civilization has several bonuses such as increased speed or decreased cost for a type of unit. Any civilization can be played in any epoch but will only be powerful in ages that use units that it has bonuses for. In scenarios, the player receives "civ points" for completing various tasks. The following are the available civilizations, grouped into their recommended epochs. With the exception of the futuristic Novaya Russia and Rebel Forces, all civilizations in Empire Earth are based upon history. From the Prehistoric to Dark Ages, the civilizations are Ancient Greece, Assyrian Empire, Babylon, Byzantine Rome, Carthage, and the Kingdom of Israel. From the Middle Ages to the Industrial Age Austria, England, Franks, Kingdom of Italy, the Ottoman Empire, and Spain are available. From the Atomic Age to Modern times France, Germany, Great Britain, Italy, Russia, and the United States are playable, and from Digital Age to Space Age China, Novaya Russia, and Rebel Forces are playable. Japan and Korea are added in the Art of Conquest expansion and belong in the "Digital Age to Space Age" group.

== Campaigns ==
Like many other real-time strategy games, Empire Earth has single-player campaigns. However, unlike some games, each scenario has a story to tell and the player takes part in that story. Apart from the Russian campaign, the mission "Operation Sealion" in the German campaign, and possibly the first four scenarios in the Greek campaign, all of the battles in the campaigns are based on true events.

=== Learning campaign ===
The first campaign in Empire Earth is the Learning campaign. This campaign is where players are taught how to play Empire Earth. This campaign is available in both the original game and The Art of Conquest. This campaign is not required to be played in order and is divided into two parts. The first part is about the rise of Phoenicia. The second part is about the rise of the Byzantine Empire.

=== Greek campaign ===
The first real campaign focuses on Ancient Greece. The opening five scenarios (of eight scenarios total) focus on the rise of Greece. The story tells of the early Helladic people from Anatoly, the Trojan War, the rise of Athens by unifying Attica, and the first years of the Peloponnesian War. There are some fictional elements as well (such as the Trojan horse being given to the Ithacans by the gods). The sixth scenario of the campaign is about the life of Alexander the Great. This part is about Alexander's ascension to the Macedonian throne and the establishment of the League of Corinth by crushing the revolt of Thebes, Athens and Sparta. The following scenario is about the Battle of the Granicus, Battle of Issus, and the siege of Tyre. The final scenario is the Battle of Gaugamela, the capture of Babylon and the battle for the Persian Gates, a mountain pass beyond which lies Persepolis, the ceremonial capital of the Persian Empire. The campaign ends when Alexander and his army enters Persepolis and Alexander manages to escape an assassination attempt while visiting the tomb of Xerxes I of Persia.

=== English campaign ===
The English campaign is about the struggles between England and France for superiority in Europe. The first three scenarios (of eight total) are about William I of England, his victory against the rebellion from the barons with the help of Henry I of France in 1047, and the Battle of Hastings in 1066. The next three scenarios take place during the Hundred Years' War between England and France; Edward, the Black Prince and his raids in France are featured in the fourth and fifth scenarios. The sixth scenario is about Henry V of England's story, some parts based on William Shakespeare's play. The first part is the internal unrest of Lollards while the second part sees the occupation of Harfleur and the Battle of Agincourt. The final two scenarios are led by Arthur Wellesley, 1st Duke of Wellington, who meets Napoleon I of France in battles at Roliça, Talavera and Waterloo.

=== German campaign ===
In the German campaign, the first four scenarios—out of seven total—take place during World War I and feature the Manfred von Richthofen, the Red Baron. The player follows Richthofen through his early days of flight and the development of his "Flying Circus." The first mission involves directing Richthofen and his pilot, Count Holck, to safety after their aircraft is shot down over Poland in 1915, but in subsequent missions, Richthofen is a minor character. In the next three missions, the player protects shipments of war materials into Germany, directs German forces at the Battle of Verdun, and directs the Kaiserschlacht at the Battle of the Somme.

The second part, consisting of three scenarios, deals with Nazi Germany and the first years of World War II in Europe. The first scene introduces the Blitzkrieg, in which the player has to conquer Poland, Scandinavia, and France before an American-Soviet alliance makes it impossible. The next mission deals with the German U-boat and naval blockade of Great Britain and the Battle of Britain, which features the Kriegsmarine surface fleet led by the battleship Bismarck facing off against the British Home Fleet. In the final scenario—the never-attempted Operation Sealion—the player leads German forces in an invasion of Great Britain under the famous Field Marshal Erwin Rommel, ultimately annexing the United Kingdom to the Greater German Reich and thwarting a surprise attack by the U.S. 5th Fleet (led by the carrier USS Enterprise) in the process.

=== Russian campaign ===
In the Russian campaign, the player leads Novaya Russia, a reconstruction of the Russian Federation. The game begins in 2018, with the Russian political dissident Grigor Stoyanovich heading up a full-sized civil war from Volgograd, followed by a seizure of power in the Kremlin in Moscow. The second scenario is about Europe's unsuccessful attempt to free Novaya Russia's oppressed population and Russia's conquest of the continent. In the third scenario the now-old Grigor appoints his robotic bodyguard as his successor, crushes a coup in Moscow with help from loyalist forces, and finally succumbs to heart problems. Under Grigor II, Novaya Russia continues its conquest of the world by invading and subjugating China. China had been building a time machine, but the Russian forces destroy it, narrowly averting a time paradox. By this time, Novaya Russia has control over much of Eurasia.

In the penultimate scenario, during an attempted invasion of the United States in 2098, General Sergei Molotov finally realizes that Grigor II became mad with power, and deserts instead of following orders to wipe out the entire population of Cuba. Cooperating with U.S. agent Molly Ryan, he re-enacts the Chinese plan, building a time machine and returning to 2018 in order to set things right. They arrived just a few minutes late, as Grigor already left Voronezh. In addition, Grigor II realized their plans and took the time machine, fortifying Volgograd with a sizeable detachment of cybernetic forces. A massive battle ensued, ending in the technologically horribly outmatched Molotov and Ryan destroying Grigor II and assassinating Grigor (who proved to be unreasonable due to the knowledge of Novaya Russia's military might).

== Development ==
Empire Earth was announced by Stainless Steel Studios in May 1998. When first interviewed about the game, Rick Goodman and Stefan Arnold commented about the progress and layout of the game on December 12, 2000. They mentioned many aspects of the game, including the use of heroes, unit upgrades, the availability of civilizations, economic build-up, and polishing of the final product.

On January 18, 2001, Stainless Steel Studios added Damon "Stratus" Gauthier to work on the multiplayer aspect of the game. He was a veteran of several StarCraft tournaments, and was meant to balance the multiplayer of the game. Empire Earth also made appearances at E3 2000 and E3 2001 about its progress, and a beta test and movie for it were released in early August 2001.

== Reception ==
=== Sales ===
Empire Earth sold over 1 million units globally by 2002. In the United States, it sold 390,000 copies and earned $16.7 million by August 2006. It was the country's 41st best-selling computer game between January 2000 and August 2006. In the United States, combined sales of all Empire Earth games released between January 2000 and August 2006 had reached 870,000 units. Empire Earth received a "Silver" sales award from the Entertainment and Leisure Software Publishers Association (ELSPA), indicating sales of at least 100,000 copies in the United Kingdom. In Spain, the Asociación Española de Distribuidores y Editores de Software de Entretenimiento offered it a "Gold" prize, for 40,000 sales in the country during its first year. In France, the game sold 110,000 units by March 2005.

=== Critical reviews ===
Review scores
Publication	Score
IGN	8.5 of 10
GameSpy	94 of 100
GameSpot	7.9 of 10
GameRankings	82%

Empire Earth averaged an 82% according to GameRankings, and earned GameSpy's 2001 "PC Game of the Year" award. It was rated 8.5/10 by IGN, who commented "Anyone who's familiar with Age of Empires is going to hit the ground running in Empire Earth. With a few additions and some small changes the economic model and interface is pretty much exactly like that in AoE2." GameSpot was not as impressed, giving it 7.9/10, saying "Empire Earth is best reserved for hard-core real-time strategy players who won't mind the game's less-than-stellar graphics and sound but will instead relish the ability to relive 14 different epochs of human warfare.". Game Informer was disappointed and gave it a 6.25/10, saying "Empire Earth couldn't walk the walk like it talked the talk. Although no one patch can fix either of the aforementioned items, the latter will certainly see some type of quick adjustment in the near future."

== Legacy ==
Empire Earth spawned an expansion pack and several sequels. The expansion pack, Empire Earth: The Art of Conquest, was released in 2002.

Empire Earth was re-released as Empire Earth: Gold Edition in May, 2003. It contains both the original game and the expansion pack, manuals, and technology trees for both games, hotkey reference and the official strategy guide.

Empires: Dawn of the Modern World was considered to be a "spiritual sequel" to Empire Earth, since it was also made by Stainless Steel Studios and released between Empire Earth and Empire Earth II. It was released in 2003.

A sequel, Empire Earth II, was released in 2005. Empire Earth II: The Art of Supremacy, the expansion pack for Empire Earth II, was released in 2006. Empire Earth II was developed by Mad Doc Software and published by Vivendi Universal Games.

A mobile version of Empire Earth, Empire Earth Mobile, was released in 2005.

Another sequel, Empire Earth III was released in 2007. It was developed by Mad Doc Software and published by Sierra Entertainment.

On Monday, November 3, 2008, at 7pm GMT, the WON online multiplayer servers for Empire Earth and Empire Earth: The Art of Conquest were permanently shut down by Vivendi.

=== Community ===
In the early 2000s the game quickly attracted a community of fans, the majority of which were on forums such as Heaven Games.

Over time the community reduced in size as the game became less popular and its technology became more outdated. Various issues such as backward compatibility of the game have also contributed to preventing new players from discovering the game over time. The community has been maintained in part by sharing custom scenarios and various creations such as textures and 3D models, but mostly by projects that have helped the game evolve over time.

=== Technical limitations ===
Empire Earth was developed using DirectX 7 for Windows 95 and 98, most modern drivers do not support this version of DirectX.

== See also ==
- List of PC games
- Age of Empires
