= Rise and Fall: Civilizations at War =

2006 video game

- Developers: Stainless Steel Studios, Midway Games San Diego
- Publisher: Midway Games
- Designer: Rick Goodman
- Composer: Jason Graves
- Engine: Titan 2.0
- Platform: Windows
- Release: NA: June 12, 2006; EU: June 16, 2006
- Genres: Real-time strategy, third-person shooter
- Modes: Single-player, multiplayer

Rise and Fall: Civilizations at War is a real-time strategy video game developed by both Stainless Steel Studios and Midway Games which was released in June 2006. The game incorporates segments of both third-person and first-person shooter gameplay, by allowing the player to temporarily control a "hero". Rise and Fall is based in the first millennium BC, and features four playable civilizations: Persia, Greece, Egypt, and Rome. The game includes over eighty civilization-unique military units, as well as eight "hero" units, of which only one may be purchased during a game. In Rise and Fall, there are two campaigns: one follows the conquests of Alexander the Great; and the other, the fictional liberation of Egypt by Cleopatra.

During the game's development, Stainless Steel Studios closed. They abandoned all their games, including Rise and Fall, which was near finishing. Rick Goodman, founder of Stainless Steel and the lead designer of Rise and Fall, reported that Midway stopped funding the game when its release date was pushed back by several months. Midway then decided to finish the game themselves. Reviews of the game were mixed; it won two awards, and was commercially successful in the United Kingdom.

On October 16, 2008, Midway released a free, ad-supported version of the game, supported by the US Air Force.

== Gameplay ==
Featuring mainly RTS, but also third-person and—with a few heroes only—first-person shooter scenarios, the gameplay in Rise and Fall is unique. The goal of the game is to defeat the opponent(s), which is done by first micromanaging a base, and then training an army to destroy the enemy's position. Both land and sea units are available, allowing for different strategies, including amphibious warfare. As in most RTS games, units fight using a rock, paper, scissors method, meaning some soldiers are more capable of defeating a certain kind of enemy, while being defeated by another (ex. cavalry defeat archers, archers defeat spearmen, spearmen defeat cavalry).

Military units in Rise and Fall are grouped as infantry, cavalry, special, siege, or naval. Infantry, cavalry, and some special units automatically group themselves into formations—groups of soldiers that receive attack and defense bonuses—when at least eight of that kind of unit is present; the maximum number of units a formation may consist of is sixty-four. The unit's speed, attack, defensive capabilities, and range vary, depending on several factors; these include their civilization; unit type; the upgrades that have been purchased; whether or not they are in formation, and, if so, its size. Three resources—wood, gold, and glory—are used to build structures, train units, purchase upgrades; a fourth resource, stamina, is spent using "hero mode." Wood and gold are deposited in settlements, or one of their various upgrades, such as town centers. Glory and stamina are both earned: glory by building and fighting, and stamina when the hero unit kills an enemy. In several RTS games, upgrades—sometimes called "Ages"—are available that represent time periods or technological levels; Rise and Fall uses a similar concept. When upgrades to the hero—called "Levels" in this game—are purchased with glory, new technologies, upgrades, units, and advisors are unlocked. Advisors—paid for with glory as well—provide civilization-specific benefits and bonuses to the player's army and economy. Outposts, guarded by artificial intelligence soldiers,—soldiers who defend automatically—also play an important part in Rise and Fall. Conquering outposts increases the number of units trained from military buildings or ships, while not augmenting their price. The outpost guardians, however, protect it, and reappear until the outpost is taken by a player; once captured, they protect the outpost from attacks by the owner's enemies.

Another feature in Rise and Fall is "hero mode," which allows the player to temporarily take control of a hero, as if in a third-person shooter game; certain heroes—for instance, Cleopatra—can zoom in further than others with their bow, allowing the player to aim as if in a first-person shooter game. In hero mode, the hero unit becomes much more powerful, often allowing the player to destroy multiple enemy formations. Stamina is required to use this mode, however, and is lost quickly during its duration. The longest a player can spend in hero mode varies with stamina levels, which is increased with upgrades to the hero. To balance the game, hero mode can be used much less than RTS mode. Each civilization has two heroes from which to choose, usually a famous leader in history, such as Alexander the Great, but sometimes derived from mythology, such as Achilles.

Rise and Fall may be played in both single-player and multiplayer. In single-player games, one human player plays against up to seven computer players. If more than two players will play, they may be grouped into teams, which can be chosen to be either permanent or manageable during the game using diplomacy. Other options available before beginning a game include the "population capacity", the number of units that are trainable, which map of the twenty-four to play on; the difficulty setting; the number of resources given at the start; and the color and civilization of all players. Rise and Fall's multiplayer component is powered by GameSpy, and may be played using the updated version of the game. Players may host or join matches through either the internet or LAN. The host of the game chooses the options, while the player(s) who join the game either agree to the conditions or reject them; the match begins when all players agree with the host's terms. Each player selects a civilization and color, and does not require the host to change them. The multiplayer was discussed on the forums of Rise and Fall Heaven, a popular strategy game fansite. It was said that it is not frequented by many players, and that matches are often difficult to begin due to indecisiveness. During a game, the rules previously agreed upon are often broken by one or more players, leading to unruliness. Despite these drawbacks, several players reported that they played multiplayer.

== Campaigns ==
Alexander the Great fighting in an amphitheatre in the campaign.

Rise and Fall includes two campaigns, which are divided into acts containing from two to four chapters each; a chapter comprises a battle and a cinematic. The first campaign follows Alexander the Great on his quest to defeat the allegiance of his brother, and the Persian general, Memnon. The second campaign features Cleopatra, and her attempts to repel a Roman invasion by Octavian.

The Alexander the Great campaign recounts the young king's conquest of Asia. The beginning cinematic is of the killing of Philip II of Macedon, Alexander's father, and introduces Alexander as a naive and unprepared prince, who is challenged by the duties thrust upon him. Alexander decides to follow the advice of his tutor, Aristotle, by quelling rebellions in Greece and its territories, as well as forming an allegiance with Parmenion. He then follows his brother—who had left to Persia—by sea, and faces off against the army and navy of General Memnon. Captured by deceit, Alexander escapes, but only after fighting in an amphitheatre. He then begins to sack Persian cities, and takes a temple containing the Bow of Heracles, a mythical weapon of immense power. Alexander eventually captures his brother, and executes him for treason. Finally, during the Siege of Tyre (332 BC), Alexander defeats Memnon, and is portrayed as having earned his kingdom. By now, Alexander has matured, and his men hold him in high esteem.

The Cleopatra campaign focuses on Cleopatra VII and her efforts to drive out an invasion by Octavian. As the Roman legions take control of much of Egypt, Cleopatra, her lover Mark Antony, and her brother Ptolemy free areas under Roman rule. Antony distrusts Ptolemy however, believing him to be in league with Rome. Meanwhile, Cleopatra defeats several of Octavian's legions, causing him to send one of his best generals to eliminate her. After an expedition to Nubia, Cleopatra and the Egyptians gain the ability to train war elephants, a gift from the Nubian queen. Ptolemy is found guilty of treason, as Mark Antony suspected, and is arrested. He escapes, killing the guards, but is recaptured. Before being executed, he says he did not kill the guards, and escaped only to save himself; he blames a priest, Tor, for being allied with Rome and killing his guards. The warrior priest kills two more guards as soon as he hears this, before Mark Antony attacks him. Tor quickly kills Antony, and escapes. Bent on revenge, Cleopatra tracks him down and defeats him, along with many Romans and Egyptian traitors. Octavian's general soon arrives with his legions, but is defeated multiple times. Octavian, tired of his defeats, kills him before the Roman armies, setting an example for his men. The Emperor himself then leads the attack on Alexandria, and plunders the city until Cleopatra arrives. Then, he and Cleopatra fight; the Egyptian queen slays Octavian, but is mortally wounded, and dies moments after having freed Egypt. Ptolemy buries his sister in a pyramid, and many Egyptians attend her funeral procession.

== Development and release ==
Rise and Fall was mainly developed by Stainless Steel Studios (SSSI) from 2005 to early 2006. Stainless Steel was founded in 1998, by Rick Goodman and other Age of Empires designers. Before working on Rise and Fall, they had released Empire Earth and Empires: Dawn of the Modern World, two commercially successful titles. In addition, they created two game engines, the Titan, and its upgrade, the Titan 2.0.

Rise and Fall uses the Titan 2.0 engine to run. It includes many features, such as the game's scenario editor, graphics, and artificial intelligence. The engine also powers the multiplayer mode, and handles all objects in the game world.

The scenario editor for Rise and Fall is similar to that used in Empires: Dawn of the Modern World, though Stainless Steel claims it has been improved. Features from the Empire Earth editor were re-introduced into that of Rise and Fall, and new ones were added as well. The editor handles flora in an advanced way, and has improved its movement. Ranger, a Stainless Steel Studios staff member, announced that all units—including the hero—will be editable using triggers; in Titan editors, triggers can alter unit statistics and features, allowing for many alterations to the game. The editor also allows the existing maps to be edited, and new ones created. The developers of Rise and Fall created the campaigns using the built in editor, meaning that experienced enthusiasts and modders of the game have the option of creating new missions.

The developers, however, did not finish the game due to the sudden closure of Stainless Steel. Goodman blamed Midway Games, the publisher, for not funding the project, which led to the firing of employees. A GameSpot news article on the subject read, "He [Goodman] reportedly told Gamestar that after the PC strategy game's release was pushed from October to early 2006, Midway cut off advances to Stainless Steel, which in turn had to lay off its staff due to lack of funding." As former AI programmer Daniel Higgins said, "This is true, SSSI is no more. I can't give details as to why, but I can tell you the product is in excellent shape, the team was in high morale and plowing ahead at full steam, and we were just weeks from gold disk." To complete the game, Midway, the publisher, shuffled it to their San Diego studios, where it was finished.

The game was released in North America on June 12, 2006, and in Europe four days later on June 16.

== Reception ==
=== Reviews ===
Reception

Aggregate score
Aggregator	Score
GameRankings	65%

Review scores
Publication	Score
GameSpot	6.6/10
GameSpy	2.5/5
GamesRadar+	7 of 10
IGN	6 of 10
Games Radar UK	9/10
Pro-G	5/10

Rise and Fall was received by critics with both positive and negative scores, with an average rating—according to GameRankings—of 65% (78th PC game of 2006). PC Gamer UK called it "Pure 24-carat gaming gold!" Games Radar said "This RTS has its ups and downs...", while Games Radar UK said "The RTS Rubicon has been crossed." GameSpot remarked that "this game doesn't quite know what it wants to be."; IGN stated that "...there's very little reason to recommend this title to fans of the strategy or action genres."

The graphics were examined by the reviewers. Games Radar admired them, having said "Rise & Fall is about pretty units killing each other in a beautifully drawn environment..." GameSpy reported that they "are way behind the curve"; GameSpot agreed, saying: "Buildings and units seem boxy and chunky, suffering from a low number of polygons, while the textures themselves look grainy."

The sound in the game fared well in the reviews. GameSpot said of the music "The game sounds better, at least, thanks to some appropriately pompous Gladiator-style music." IGN reported that "Music is decent, and voice-overs are passable, but sound effects need some serious help."

The campaign was also criticized, and was said to have "poorly rendered, incomprehensible cutscenes filled with bad dialogue and characters that seemed to swagger like they were walking down Main Street in a Western-movie gunfight" by GameSpy; IGN agreed, reporting that "the cutscenes are also presented as pre-rendered engine movies compressed to questionable quality." GameSpot said that the hero-only levels required "...a vast amount of patience, the reflexes of a teenager, and a good deal of luck," and that the campaigns are "bound to turn off strategy fans". IGN complained that "these levels take a long damn time to load..."

Naval warfare was thoroughly reviewed as well. GameSpy enjoyed it, saying "The game also puts a new spin on naval combat...when everything goes just right with ship movement...this is a blast." On the other hand, IGN thought it was not well done, and wrote that "One of the features that looked fairly tasty was naval combat and some aspects of it are nice...Unfortunately it's another case of execution not coming through. Pro-G agreed, and did not enjoy the naval side of the game at all, complaining that "...it's often near impossible to dock on dry land.", and that "numerous boats in your fleet...complicate things further, with the path finding AI seemingly unable to navigate around other boats in anything but huge stretches of open water."

Hero mode was also praised by some, and depreciated by others. Games Radar thought, "...it's cool to pick off enemy soldiers in first person...", while Pro-G's impression was that "Hero mode is a good idea that's gone badly wrong." IGN said that "the lack of personality, special combat moves, and the fun factor that most action games focus on really makes hero mode dull." GameSpot was more forgiving; they thought that "In small doses, hero command is a nice feature that lets you vent some steam by hacking and slashing mindlessly. But when it's the basis of an entire level it can be maddening..." GameSpy had mixed opinions; they began saying that "the Hero...is a genuinely fun part of the game as well as a key element of the player's strategy.", but then shifted to a more negative view: "Once players get past the visceral thrill of being able to buzzsaw through enemy armies...they'll realize that such moments are pretty few and far between." Finally, they mentioned that "the hero controls are a bit swimmy, and the game's collision detection in third-person mode is kind of wonky."

Overall, the opinions of reviewers seem to have been summed up by Pro-G: "One day someone is going to combine the RTS with another genre and pull it off really well; Rise & Fall isn't that game. The basic RTS elements are sound, but the hero mode verges on awful, boat control is a nightmare, and the campaigns are dull... There are so many other games out there that offer a better all-round RTS experience, there's really no reason to bother with Midway's effort. Some praise must be given for trying something a little different, but Rise & Fall is another idea that falls a long way short of its potential."

=== Awards and sales ===
Rise and Fall received two notable awards, and achieved high sales in the United Kingdom. It was one of the winners in the "E3 2005: Best of Show", hosted by The Wargamer. They were impressed with the game, and complimented its innovation: "...real-time strategy games are simply wars between faceless and lifeless armies. Sure, it's nice to put a zillion units on the game screen and watch them run into each other, but too often these games blend together because they lack personality. Stainless Steel Studios seems to have solved that problem in Rise & Fall, their new historical strategy game which allows players to not only control massive armies at war, but also jump into the shoes of the heroes themselves...". The other award won by Rise and Fall was in the "Strategy" category at the British Academy Video Games Awards. According to the Entertainment and Leisure Software Publishers Association, Rise and Fall became one of the best-selling games in the United Kingdom soon after its release, and it remained in the top ten for two months.
