= Off Road =

Off Road may refer to:

- Off Road (video game), 2008 video game published by Xplosiv; also known as Ford Racing Off Road
- Super Off Road, 1989 arcade game released by Leland Corporation
- Off Road Challenge, 1998 console game released by Nintendo

== See also ==
- Off-roading, term for driving a specialized vehicle on unpaved roads
