= THQ San Diego =

American video game developer

- Formerly: Leland Corporation (1987-1992); Leland Interactive Media (1992-1997); Midway Studios San Diego (1997–2009)
- Type: Subsidiary
- Industry: Video games
- Predecessor: Cinematronics
- Founded: June 5, 1987; 39 years ago
- Defunct: June 4, 2012; 14 years ago
- Headquarters: San Diego, California, U.S.
- Products: Dragon's Lair II: Time Warp; Super Off Road; Quarterback; Ready 2 Rumble Boxing
- Parent: Tradewest (1987-1994); WMS Industries (1994-1996); Midway Games (1996–2009); THQ (2009–2012)

THQ San Diego was an American video game company formed on June 5, 1987 as Leland Corporation, from the assets of Cinematronics. It was a subsidiary of arcade and home game producer Tradewest, which acquired those assets out of the former company’s bankruptcy. After 1992, the company moved to development of home games to be published by Tradewest and other companies like Williams under the name Leland Interactive Media. In 1994, when WMS Industries acquired Tradewest, Leland was absorbed into their internal development, which was then renamed to Midway Studios San Diego in 1997. Warner Bros. Games, through their acquisition of Midway Games, owns the rights to Leland Corporation/Midway San Diego's games until 2009. In 2009, it was sold to THQ and renamed to THQ San Diego.

== History ==
=== Background ===
Cinematronics Inc. was a manufacturer of arcade video games based in San Diego (later in the suburb of El Cajon). They notably introduced games utilizing vector graphics to the coin-op industry with Space Wars (1977) and the first successful Laserdisc game in Dragon’s Lair (1983). The company had gone bankrupt in August 1982 in the wake of several unsuccessful games and spent more than four years staving off foreclosure under Chapter 11 bankruptcy.

Tradewest was a company who licensed arcade games from other companies for manufacture, both as full upright cabinets utilizing outsourced manufacturing and kit games that fit into popular cabinets. Most notably, they released the smash hit SNK game Ikari Warriors (1986). In 1986, they released Cinematronics’ Redline Racer (1986) as a kit game. Looking to expand their operations, the company entered into negotiations to purchase the assets of the privately held Cinematronics from a bankruptcy trustee led by Jim Pierce. This union was announced at the ACME trade show in March 1987.

=== Early history and arcade success ===
The Leland Corporation was incorporated on June 5, 1987. Tradewest purchased all the assets including the factory and all of its employees to transfer into the new company and Cinematronics itself was renamed to The Leland Corporation and also absorbed the arcade cabinets selling under the Tradewest name. Initially, Cinematronics co-founder Jim Pierce remained President of the new company, but he was eventually supplanted by Tradewest partner John Rowe. Pierce left the company on March 18, 1988. He initially partnered with Tradewest on an independent venture before fully retiring until his death in 2011.

The first release by Leland was Quarterback (1987), a standalone upright cabinet – a break from their previous strategy of releasing games under their Cinemat hardware. It became a success and prompted the release of updates including the celebrity endorsed John Elway’s Team Quarterback (1988) and All-American Quarterback (1989). The celebrity endorsement strategy was carried over into other games including Ivan “Ironman” Stewart’s Super Off-Road (1988) and Danny Sullivan’s Indy Heat (1991). Product development at the company came to involve a large team of specialist game developers, salesmen, and executives. The game concepting involved storyboards and physical mock-ups of objects – an early form of digitization in arcade games.

Leland’s arcade games found their way to home consoles like the Nintendo Entertainment System courtesy of their connection to Tradewest. Developers like British Rare Ltd and Software Creations created versions of their games for the home market. These games often underwent QA testing by Leland’s development team before release. A revised version of the Cinemat system played host to games like Brute Force (1990). The arcade games Aaaargh! (1988) and Ataxx (1990) were created in cooperation with Virgin Interactive, who had opened an office in California under the name Arcadia Systems which Leland did distribution for.

Dragon's Lair II: Time Warp, which had been completed in 1984, had been location tested but not released due to the decline of LaserDisc arcade games. With a revival in interest for games featuring video through CD-ROM multimedia releases and LaserDisc releases like American Laser Games’ Mad Dog McCree (1990), Leland released the long-shelved Dragon's Lair II in cooperation with Sullivan Bluth Interactive in 1991. The game was only available in an upright cabinet.

=== Shift to home consoles, rebrand and sale ===
Dragon’s Lair II was Leland’s final arcade release. In 1992, they moved out of their manufacturing facility on Friendship Drive to a small studio located at 4444 Zion Ave in El Cajon. Their strategy changed to in-house development of Tradewest titles on home systems and the brand of the studio changed to Leland Interactive Media. A large number of their game developers left for other studios while the remaining team created new titles. These included sequels to Leland arcade titles like Super Off Road: The Baja (1993) and original titles like Fun 'N Games (1992).

In April 1994, WMS Industries purchased Tradewest as part of their strategy to become more directly involved in the home video game market. Leland Interactive Media was acquired as part of this deal and the assets were placed in the hold of Williams Home Entertainment. The original company was renamed to Rowe Resources Inc. on May 4, 1994 to be used as a holding company by John Rowe who joined Williams to oversee development efforts.

Scott Patterson, who joined the company, created the Williams Entertainment Sound System, which was in use by the company's development division for its sound engine. The team went on to develop games for the PlayStation and Nintendo 64, most notably conversions of Mortal Kombat 3 and Cruis'n USA. The company was also an early supporter of Nintendo 64's development tools, developing most of the hardware. In 1996, the company moved into a new state-of-the art facility in San Diego, to develop games for the Nintendo 64, which was led by Mike Abbott. The company as a business corporation was thereafter formally dissolved in February 1997, and the entire company, including its development staff was renamed to Midway Studios San Diego.

Midway Studios San Diego then started supplying design work for Nintendo 64. The company had last year just moved into a state-of-the art facility in San Diego in mid 1996. The two offices were combined in 2001. In addition to original games, Midway San Diego developed home-console versions of arcade games produced by sibling studios Midway Studios Chicago (the original Midway Manufacturing Company), and Midway Games West, the former Atari Games, the arcade division of the original Atari Inc., which Midway acquired in 1996 and was closed in 2004.

Asides from ports, the company produced a few original games from original IPs, like Bio F.R.E.A.K.S., Off-Road Challenge, Hydro Thunder and Offroad Thunder for the arcades, the latter two was included for Midway Arcade Treasures 3, as well as Ready 2 Rumble Boxing, Gravity Games Bike: Street Vert Dirt and Freaky Flyers. They also assisted development on games like Rise & Fall: Civilizations at War. In 2008, Midway Studios Los Angeles was then morged into Midway Studios San Diego.

=== Sale to THQ and rename ===
On July 10, 2009, Midway confirmed all their remaining assets would be sold off to Warner Bros. Interactive Entertainment (now Warner Bros. Games). Midway Studios San Diego however was not included and would be closed down. On August 9, THQ announced they had acquired the studio from Midway for $200,000. The sale of the studio included all assets, except for TNA Impact! as the license went to SouthPeak Games (THQ San Diego would keep the source code for the original 2008 game).

The first game the developer released under the new name was the game WWE All Stars. THQ would later make them the main developer for future UFC licensed games, but it on June 4, 2012, THQ announced that not only that the UFC license would be sold to Electronic Arts, but they would also close THQ San Diego. Each of its assets were sold individually, such as the WWE license going to Take-Two Interactive and the Darksiders license going to Nordic Games GmbH. Nordic would later buy the THQ name and become THQ Nordic, but the San Diego studio remained closed.

== Games ==
Year	Title	Platform(s)	Notes
1987	Double Play: Super Baseball / Home Run Derby	Arcade	
1987	Quarterback	Arcade	
1988	Super Dodge Ball	Arcade	Developed by Technos Japan
1988	Viper	Arcade	Sequel to Danger Zone
1988	Strike Zone	Arcade	
1988	John Elway's Team Quarterback	Arcade	
1988	Aaargh!	Arcade	Developed by Virgin Interactive
1989	Ivan “Ironman” Stewart’s Super Off-Road	Arcade	
1989	All-American Quarterback	Arcade	
1990	Pig Out	Arcade	
1990	Ataxx	Arcade	
1990	King Arthur's Court	Arcade	Not a game. A redemption prize display distributed by Leland.
1990	Brute Force	Arcade	
1991	Danny Sullivan's Indy Heat	Arcade	
1991	Dragon's Lair II: Time Warp (Note: Animation produced in 1984)	Arcade	
1991	Space Ace (Note: Released in limited quantities as a conversion kit for Dragon's Lair II)	Arcade	Modernised re-release of a Cinematronics game from 1984. (Note: Outside of a higher difficulty level, refinements include a high score table, and the ability for the player to continue their game; neither of which appeared in the original release.) Originally developed by Advanced Microcomputer Systems.
1991	Asylum	Arcade	Unreleased
1992	Pro Quarterback	SNES, Genesis	
1993	Fun 'n Games	SNES, Genesis, 3DO	
1993	Super Off Road: The Baja	SNES	
1994	Troy Aikman NFL Football	SNES, Genesis, Atari Jaguar	
1994	Double Dragon V: The Shadow Falls	SNES, Genesis, Atari Jaguar	
1995	Kyle Petty's No Fear Racing	SNES	
1995	Mortal Kombat 3	PlayStation, Microsoft Windows	
1995	DOOM	PlayStation	
1996	Final DOOM	PlayStation	
1996	Mortal Kombat Trilogy	Nintendo 64	
1996	Robotron X	PlayStation, Nintendo 64	Assisted Player 1
1996	Cruis'n USA	Nintendo 64	
1997	NBA Hangtime	PlayStation, Nintendo 64	Assisted Director's Cut International
1997	DOOM 64	Nintendo 64	
1997	Rampage World Tour	PlayStation	
1997	Off Road Challenge	Arcade	
1998	Bio F.R.E.A.K.S.	PlayStation, Nintendo 64	Assisted Saffire
1998	Quake	Nintendo 64	
1998	NFL Blitz	PlayStation	
1999	Hydro Thunder	Arcade	
1999	Offroad Thunder	Arcade	
1999	NFL Blitz 2000	PlayStation	
1999	Ready 2 Rumble Boxing	Dreamcast	
2000	Ready 2 Rumble Boxing: Round 2	Dreamcast, PlayStation 2	
2002	Gravity Games Bike: Street Vert Dirt	PlayStation 2, Xbox	
2003	Freaky Flyers	GameCube, PlayStation 2, Xbox	
2005	Gauntlet: Seven Sorrows	PlayStation 2, Xbox	
2005	Midway Arcade Treasures 3	PlayStation 2, Xbox, GameCube	Assisted Digital Eclipse and GameStar
2006	Rise & Fall: Civilizations at War	Microsoft Windows	Assisted Stainless Steel Studios
2006	Midway Arcade Treasures Deluxe Edition	Microsoft Windows	Assisted Digital Eclipse and GameStar
2008	Mechanic Master	Nintendo DS	Assisted Most Wanted Entertainment
2008	TouchMaster 2	Nintendo DS	Assisted Most Wanted Entertainment
2008	TNA iMPACT!	PlayStation 3, Xbox 360	Assisted Midway Studios Los Angeles
2008	Blitz: The League II	PlayStation 3, Xbox 360	Assisted Midway Games
2008	Mortal Kombat vs. DC Universe	PlayStation 3, Xbox 360	Assisted Midway Games
2011	WWE All Stars	PlayStation 3, Xbox 360	First title under THQ San Diego
2012	Darksiders II	Microsoft Windows, PlayStation 3, Xbox 360	Assisted Vigil Games, under THQ San Diego
