= Empire Earth =

Video game series

- Genre: Real-time strategy
- Developers: Stainless Steel Studios, Mad Doc Software
- Publishers: Sierra Entertainment, Rebellion Developments, Vivendi Games
- Platform: Microsoft Windows
- First release: Empire Earth; 2001
- Latest release: Empire Earth III; 2007

Empire Earth is a series of real-time strategy video games developed by Stainless Steel Studios and Mad Doc Software, and published by Sierra Entertainment. The games in the series are historical RTS games that are similar to Age of Empires. Rick Goodman, who designed Empire Earth and Empires: Dawn of the Modern World, was one of the lead designers of Age of Empires. The games use the Titan and Titan 2.0 engine, which was sold after Stainless Steel Studios closed.

== Chronology ==
=== Empire Earth (2001) ===
Release timeline
2001	Empire Earth
2002	The Art of Conquest
2003
2004
2005	Empire Earth II
2005	Empire Earth (mobile game)
2006	The Art of Supremacy
2007	Empire Earth III

The first game of the series, Empire Earth, was released in 2001. It was developed by Stainless Steel Studios, and published by Sierra Entertainment. The game was praised for its in-depth gameplay and received positive critical acclaim. The 2 million unit sales were enough to spawn an expansion pack and several sequels to the game. The game had 14 epochs in it, which totaled 500,000 years. The game also included 21 nations, from every age and location. It consisted of 4 campaign mode missions which consisted of historic moments based on Ancient Greece, England's constant wars with the French including the Norman Conquests of England, the Germans in World War I and II, and a fantasy future scenario involving Russia and their conquest of the world.

Initially released in 2002, Empire Earth: The Art of Conquest was an expansion pack for the first Empire Earth. The expansion pack added several new campaigns and features to the game but was received negatively because there were many small bugs that were never addressed by Mad Doc Software. The expansion pack was released before the release of Empires: Dawn of the Modern World.

Empires: Dawn of the Modern World was not technically the sequel to Empire Earth, but it was released in 2003 and sometimes referenced as the spiritual sequel to Empire Earth. The game was also designed by Rick Goodman and the SSSI team and had many throwbacks to the first Empire Earth. Empires: Dawn of the Modern World was much more condensed, with only 1,000 years and only nine civilizations. Even so, the game received positive acclaim as a good RTS, but not very innovative.

=== Empire Earth II (2005) ===
Empire Earth II was released in 2005, two years after Empires: Dawn of the Modern World. Empire Earth II was developed by Mad Doc Software and published by Sierra Entertainment since Stainless Steel Studios left the project to develop Empires: Dawn of the Modern World. Empire Earth II used revamped graphics and weather effects, but still retained the original feel of Empire Earth's gameplay. The game was received relatively well (about 79% on average according to MetaCritic), a little lower than the original Empire Earth and Empires: Dawn of the Modern World.

A screenshot from Empire Earth II

A mobile turn-based strategy was developed by Vivendi and published by Wonderphone on October 14, 2005. It is much smaller than any other titles in the series, with only four epochs and other condensed features.

Empire Earth II: The Art of Supremacy was released in 2006 and was an expansion pack for Empire Earth II. The expansion pack added several new campaigns, civilizations, units, and features to the original Empire Earth II game. However, the game was received worse than its expansion pack predecessor and was considered bad for its lack of innovation with the new campaigns it offered.

=== Empire Earth III (2007) ===
Empire Earth III is a real-time strategy video game by Mad Doc Software and released by Sierra Entertainment on November 5, 2007. It was received poorly in contrast to its predecessors.

== Reception ==
Empire Earth, the first in the series, was well received by critics, averaging an 82% overall. Empire Earth II did nearly as well as its predecessor, with a 79% average. The expansion packs were given mediocre reviews at best, with Conquest averaging 66% and Supremacy averaging 61%. Empires: Dawn of the Modern World had a closer rating to Empire Earth than anything else in the series, with an 81% average. Empire Earth mobile averaged about 77%. Empire Earth III was the worst received title of the series, averaging only a 50% overall.
