= Kyle Petty's No Fear Racing =

1995 video game

- North American cover art
- Developer: Leland Interactive Media
- Publisher: Williams Entertainment
- Director: Kevin Lydy
- Producer: Michael Abbot
- Designers: Gary Luecker; Dave A. Wagner; Steven Kramer; David J. Witters
- Programmer: Dave A. Wagner
- Composer: Aubrey Hodges
- Platform: Super NES
- Release: NA: April 1995; JP: June 30, 1995
- Genre: Racing
- Modes: Single-player, multiplayer

Kyle Petty's No Fear Racing is a stock car racing video game for the Super NES that was released in 1995.

== Gameplay ==
Two player mode allows two players to compete against each other using a split screen. The two player mode allows equal opportunities towards teamwork and competition in the single race mode as well as in the season mode. Players can either race on season mode or exhibition mode.

It is also possible to create an original race course. Custom decals can also be placed on the course as a way to personalize a course; this can be done to an extent that no two courses will look exactly the same twice in a row. After building the layout of the track, the player can choose a song that will play when they race on their customized track. Players can also re-create their favorite race tracks.

The object in the game is to get as to close to first place as possible by the end of the race. Practice is also necessary if the player wants to start at the pole position. During the season mode, the player must score points in order to remain in the competition.

All the vehicles in the game are depicted as generic 1994 Chevrolet Lumina machines despite the presence of various manufacturers in the actual 1994 NASCAR Winston Cup Series season.

== Japanese version ==
Kyle Petty's No Fear Racing was released in Japan as Circuit USA (サーキットＵＳＡ) by Virgin Interactive Entertainment on June 30, 1995. The tracks are stripped of their realism. Furthermore, its graphics are much cruder than the American version: in track crossings, there are no visible bridges or elevation effects. This version does not feature Petty nor any No Fear branding.

== Reception ==
Reception

Review score
Publication	Score
Famitsu	4/10, 5/10, 4/10, 4/10

The two sports reviewers of Electronic Gaming Monthly gave the game scores of 5 and 6 out of 10, criticizing it as having a poor frame rate and boring track designs. In contrast, GamePro gave the game a rave review, applauding the strong options, car customization, effective controls, detailed graphics, the use of the car radio to keep the player updated about the tires and fuel, and particularly the ability to create custom race tracks, saying this "adds a creative dimension that's rare in the world of racing games".

Next Generation reviewed the SNES version of the game, rating it two stars out of five, and stated that "after about three races, this game is old fast. A more truthful title would have been Kyle Petty's No Variety Racing".
