= NFL Head Coach =

2006 video game

- Developer: EA Tiburon
- Publisher: EA Sports
- Series: Madden NFL
- Platforms: PlayStation 2; Xbox; Windows
- Release: NA: June 20, 2006
- Genre: Sports
- Modes: Single-player, multiplayer

NFL Head Coach is a National Football League video game that was released on June 20, 2006, for the PlayStation 2, Xbox and Windows. The game allows the player to control an NFL team and become the greatest coach in NFL history. It features then-Pittsburgh Steelers head coach Bill Cowher on the cover.

== Gameplay ==
The concept behind the game puts the player in the position of a head coach for a National Football League franchise, similar to FIFA Manager where the player takes control of the head coach of an association football team. The player will make roster moves, create playbooks, and hire and fire assistant coaches. Success is measured by wins, playoff success, how well the player does in the NFL draft, and the careers of assistant coaches. The game also has ESPN integration, such as Mel Kiper Jr. hosting the NFL draft, Trey Wingo for the game's first few cutscenes and cutscenes featuring Steve Sabol as the player move through the ranks as a head coach.

NFL Head Coach supported online multiplayer. The online servers were shut down on September 1, 2007

== Plot ==
The game begins the week after Super Bowl XL when the Pittsburgh Steelers pull off a 21–10 victory over the Seattle Seahawks. The coach that the player is about to take control of was formerly the offensive/defensive coordinator for the Steelers, will soon become a head coach. First, the player selects a team and then proceeds to the job interview. The coach overall will range from 50 to around 80 at the end of the interview. Depending on how well the interview goes, the player will receive up to five offers from five teams though there are ten teams that are likely to send the player an offer although the player can pick any team they wish. The main 10 teams that will send the player an offer are the Bills, Chiefs, Jets, Lions, Raiders, Rams, Packers, Saints, Texans, and Vikings. Of these 10 teams, the team with worst last season record is the Houstan Texas with 2-14 and the team with best last season record are Kansas City Chiefs with 10–6. The player selects a team and then signs a contract with them. In addition to being the head coach, the player is also the general manager of the team. On the first day, the player will meet the team owner. Aside from meeting the team owner, the player also meets the other coaches with whom he will work. Daily activities, depending on the time of the season, include hiring and firing coaches, RFA, UFA, checking e-mail, identifying players to scout at the NFL Scouting Combine and the NFL draft, gameplanning for the next game, and running practice. This was before the franchise tag was implemented in the EA NFL games but was featured in the next head coach game, NFL Head Coach 09. During the game, the player can motivate and discuss strategy with the team, which can affect the motivated player's reception. The career is 30 years long from 2006 to 2036.

== Teams and stadiums ==
The game consists of all 32 teams from the 2005 NFL season with all 31 stadiums. Unlike NFL Head Coach 09, however, Aloha Stadium is not in NFL Head Coach. New England Patriots head coach Bill Belichick, as well as Dallas Cowboys head coach Bill Parcells, are not in the game due to licensing issues; Wade Phillips was featured in NFL Head Coach 09 as he was the coach of the Cowboys at the time.

== Reception ==
The game received positive reviews. IGN gave the game a 7.2/10, praising the NFL Films score, though commenting about the Madden engine being "not as pretty as other football games". On the contrary, GameSpot praised the engine, though criticizing the multiplayer; GameSpot also graded the game as 7.2/10. CNET scored the game 3.5/5 stars, also praising the NFL Films score, though commenting that the on-field action is blander than usual due to the lack of in-game announcers, along with some occasions when players are negatively motivated after positive motivation.

== Sequel ==
On February 26, 2008, EA Sports announced the sequel to NFL Head Coach entitled NFL Head Coach 09. It was released on August 12, 2008, for the Xbox 360 and PlayStation 3.
