= Bio F.R.E.A.K.S. =

1998 3D fighting video game

- North American Nintendo 64 cover art
- Developer: Midway Studios San Diego (Note: Nintendo 64 version developed by Saffire.)
- Publishers: NA: Midway; PAL: GT Interactive
- Director: Dave Simon
- Producer: Michael Gollieb
- Designer: Dave Simon
- Programmer: Dave Wagner
- Composer: Aubrey Hodges
- Platforms: PlayStation, Nintendo 64, Windows
- Release: Playstation, Nintendo 64: NA: May 19, 1998; PAL: September 1998; Windows: NA: August 1998
- Genre: Fighting
- Modes: Single player, multiplayer

Bio F.R.E.A.K.S. is a 3D fighting video game released by Midway in 1998. It was originally planned for arcades. Prototypes of the game were tested at arcades, but the final arcade release was canceled (although a ROM image of the prototype was eventually dumped and works in MAME) and the game was later released for the PlayStation, Nintendo 64 and Microsoft Windows.

== Plot ==
In the near future, rapid advances in technology and bio-engineering in the United States lead to massive conflict and espionage between giant corporations known as "GI-Corps". The resulting conflict, known as the Techno-Industrial Civil Wars, tears the country apart and causes the economy to collapse, with states declaring federal independence to avoid being annexed by one of the GI-Corps. The resulting government bankruptcy and ongoing takeover by the GI-Corps lead to the rise of the new region of Neo-Amerika.

To prevent further conflict and hopefully reunite America, the Secret Games Commission (SGC) is formed, working with the remaining members of government to organize a fighting tournament to settle disputes between GI-Corps. In the tournament, each GI-Corp would choose a champion to represent them, with the winner's GI-Corp gaining ownership of all of the loser's states, ultimately deciding which GI-Corp gets to control all of Neo-Amerika. The plan is put into place, leading to the creation of Biological Flying Robotic Enhanced Armored Killing Synthoids (Bio F.R.E.A.K.S.) serving as the champions for each participating GI-Corp. However, several of the Freaks resent being controlled by GI-Corps, and begin forming an underground resistance movement to earn their equal rights.

== Gameplay ==
The game uses a fully polygonal fighting engine, with 8 different fighters, and 2 boss fighters.

Bio F.R.E.A.K.S. uses a mix of hand-to-hand and long range combat. Each character has an assortment of special attacks, both close and long range, as well as "finishing attacks". Much like the Fatalities of the Mortal Kombat games, these moves can execute the player's opponents while some, like in Time Killers, will remove limbs. Damage from powerful attacks can add up, causing a limb to be destroyed as well.

The game takes place in 3D fighting arenas. Emphasis was placed on mobility, giving dashes a great range and in multiple directions.

The face buttons are assigned to specific limbs. The shoulder buttons are used for dodging, flying, and basic long range attacks.

== Reception ==
Reception

Aggregate score
Aggregator	Score		
Aggregator	N64	PC	PS
GameRankings	68%	N/A	61%

Review scores
Publication	Score		
Publication	N64	PC	PS
AllGame	N/A	3/5	2.5/5
Electronic Gaming Monthly	N/A	N/A	4.5/10 (Note: Four critics of Electronic Gaming Monthly gave the PlayStation version each a score of 5.5/10, 3/10, 5/10, and 4/10.)
Game Informer	4.5/10	N/A	3.5/10
GameFan	72% (Note: Three critics of GameFan gave the Nintendo 64 version each a score of 70, 78, and 69.)	N/A	53% (Note: Three critics of GameFan gave the PlayStation version each a score of 56, 54, and 49.)
GamePro	4/5 (Note: GamePro gave the Nintendo 64 version two 4/5 scores for graphics and overall fun factor, 4.5/5 for sound, and 3.5/5 for control.)	N/A	3.5/5 (Note: GamePro gave the PlayStation version all four 3.5/5 scores for graphics, sound, control, and overall fun factor.)
GameRevolution	B−	N/A	B−
GameSpot	6/10	N/A	5.7/10
Hyper	74%	N/A	69%
IGN	6.4/10	4/10	6.5/10
N64 Magazine	76%	N/A	N/A
Nintendo Power	7.8/10	N/A	N/A
Official U.S. PlayStation Magazine	N/A	N/A	2/5
PC Gamer (US)	N/A	79%	N/A

The Nintendo and PlayStation versions received mixed or average reviews according to the review aggregation website GameRankings.
