= WWE All Stars =

2011 video game

- North American cover art featuring several wrestlers
- Developers: THQ San Diego (PS3/Xbox 360); Subdued Software (PS2/Wii/3DS/PSP)
- Publisher: THQ
- Producers: Scot Lane and Sal Divita
- Engine: Unreal Engine 3 (PS3/Xbox 360)
- Platforms: PlayStation 2 PlayStation 3 PlayStation Portable; Wii; Nintendo 3DS; Xbox 360
- Release: NA: March 29, 2011; EU: April 1, 2011; Nintendo 3DS: NA: November 22, 2011; EU: November 25, 2011
- Genre: Sports
- Modes: Single-player, multiplayer

WWE All Stars is a 2011 professional wrestling video game published by THQ and released for Nintendo 3DS, PlayStation 2, PlayStation 3, PlayStation Portable, Wii and Xbox 360 systems. The game features current and former WWE wrestlers competing in fast-paced wrestling matches. It is also the only WWE video game to be available for the Nintendo 3DS and the last WWE video game to be released on the PlayStation 2 and PlayStation Portable.

== Gameplay ==
In contrast to the simulation-based WWE SmackDown vs. Raw series, WWE All Stars features arcade-style gameplay along with over-the-top animation and wrestlers bearing a more exaggerated look. The game is a combination of a fighting game and a wrestling game, with combos playing a major factor in gameplay, both on the ground and mid-air. Characters perform exaggerated moves, such as John Cena's Attitude Adjustment, in which he leaps high into the air and Triple H's Pedigree with shock waves running across the ring.

WWE All Stars features contemporary WWE wrestlers such as Kane, Randy Orton, Triple H, The Undertaker, Rey Mysterio, CM Punk, Sheamus and John Cena and past wrestlers such as Dusty Rhodes, Roddy Piper, Bret Hart, Shawn Michaels, Steve Austin, Ted DiBiase and Michael Hayes, as well as commentary from Jim Ross and Jerry Lawler, the latter of whom is also a playable character. All Stars has 3 modes of gameplay which are as follows:

Path of Champions

Players compete in a 10-match gauntlet against the WWE Legends, Superstars and Tag Teams. Along the way, the story progresses with cutscenes from Undertaker, Randy Orton and D-Generation X. Path of Champions presents three unique storylines in a ladder-style tournament: Path of Champions Legends – The Undertaker (featuring Paul Bearer), Path of Champions Superstars – Randy Orton and Path of Champions Tag Team – D-Generation X.

Fantasy Warfare

Fantasy Warfare is a game mode which involves a series of 15 WWE dream matches that pit Legends of the past against a characteristically similar modern-day Superstar. Each match begins with a video promo to introduce the competitors and has a personalized storyline based on the history of those involved.

Every completed bout in Fantasy Warfare will unlock the next dream match, culminating with the final bout, "Mr. WrestleMania", featuring a fantasy WrestleMania rematch between Shawn Michaels and The Undertaker. Getting through the match-ups is where ten of the game's 30-man roster can be unlocked: Eddie Guerrero, Mr. Perfect, Sgt. Slaughter, Jimmy Snuka, and Shawn Michaels can be unlocked from the Legends side; The Miz, Edge, Jack Swagger, Kane, and Drew McIntyre from the Superstars side.

There are also achievements and trophies that can be earned by finishing the mode when completed by each generation.

Exhibition

In this mode players can play their own matches with chosen superstars and opponents.

Create-a-wrestler

In this mode players can create their own superstar, using the moveset of another wrestler, including their finisher.

== Development ==
WWE All Stars was developed by THQ San Diego for the PlayStation 3 and Xbox 360 systems and Subdued Software for the PlayStation Portable, Wii, Nintendo 3DS and PlayStation 2 systems. All Stars is the first WWE game to be produced by THQ San Diego. Many of the team's employees had worked at Midway San Diego, the studio that developed the first TNA Impact! professional wrestling video game. It is the second WWE game produced by video game designer, Sal Divita, the first being WWF WrestleMania: The Arcade Game.

The first official announcement for both WWE All Stars and WWE SmackDown vs. Raw 2011 was made at E3 in June 2010 by THQ, shortly followed by an interview with gaming website GameSpot. Many DLC characters were confirmed, the first being "The Million Dollar Man" Ted DiBiase alongside his son Ted Jr. The first wave of DLC was composed of two separate packs, and a single character, Honky Tonk Man, who was released to the public as a free character on April 16, 2011, for PS3 users. However he alongside the other wave 1 DLC characters were pushed back to April 28, 2011, for Xbox 360 users. As compensation from THQ, they would release R-Truth for free. On June 27 THQ announced the release date of the next DLC packs. On July 6, 2011, R-Truth was released for free and the "All-Time Greats" Pack including Chris Jericho, The Road Warriors and Jerry Lawler were also released. On August 2, 2011, the "Southern Charisma" Pack was released, which included Michael Hayes and Mark Henry.

On August 30, 2011, THQ announced that the game would be released for the Nintendo 3DS on November 22, 2011, in North America and November 25, 2011, in Europe. The game features two new game modes and all the DLC characters. The new game modes are Score Scramble and Gauntlet; in Score Scramble players can either fight until one person gets 50,000 points or do a timed battle. In Gauntlet, players fight against the entire WWE All Stars roster excluding created characters. Also, the ability to choose finishers different from the moveset has been removed. For example, if a player were to choose Triple H's moveset for a created character, the finisher would automatically be the Pedigree.

As of April 28, 2013, the online multiplayer servers have been shut down. This has been confirmed by Aubrey Sitterson, the interactive marketing manager for WWE Games, via his Twitter account.

== Reception ==
Reception

Aggregate score
Aggregator	Score
Metacritic	(PS3) 75/100 (X360) 75/100 (Wii) 68/100 (PSP) 70/100 (3DS) 71/100

Review scores
Publication	Score
GameSpot	(Wii) 6/10 (PS3) 7/10 (X360) 7/10
IGN	(PSP) 7/10

WWE All Stars received "generally favorable reviews" on the PlayStation 3 and Xbox 360 versions while the Nintendo Wii, PlayStation Portable and Nintendo 3DS versions received "mixed or average reviews", according to review aggregator Metacritic.

Many critics were particularly fond of the art design and fast-paced gameplay, with Giant Bomb's Jeff Gerstmann calling it "an exciting game that's entertaining in a way that no wrestling game has been for a generation or more." GameSpot gave the Wii version an average score of 6 out of 10. While both the PlayStation 3 and Xbox 360 received a 7 out of 10.

GameZone gave the game a 7.5/10, stating "A fresh branch of World Wrestling Entertainment video games, THQ has done a fantastic job of cherry-picking the best elements of wrestling with some of the most recognizable characters and stars in a visually fantastic package." The PSP version of the game received mixed reviews. IGN rated the PSP a 7/10, stating "Wrestling fans will have fun when they pick this one up but I don't know how long it'll last as it's a bit shallow."

TotalPlayStation gave the game a 70/100 rating saying "The switch to a simpler play style is a welcome one, and it's great to see some of the legends of the past get their due. The presentation is top notch. Unfortunately there isn't a whole lot of content to play around with here, and it can get old fast." SpazioGames rated the game a 70/100, stating "A fast and colourful arcade wrestling game, with a good roster and deep control system; on the other hand, the title is pretty short and too much similar to the previous wrestling games on PSP".

Ztgd gave the PSP version a 70/100, stating "WWE All Stars on the PSP shouldn't be your first choice of all the available platform options, but if you are looking for a wrestling game that is fun and plays quickly on the go, it's a great choice." XboxAddict gave the game 86%, stating "This game works to recapture some of that (arcade) magic...and if any game would have ever dethroned Wrestlefest as king of the arcade mountain, this would have stomped a Steve Austin-esque mudhole into that title.

WWE All Stars was nominated for the title of Best Fighting Game at the 2011 Spike Video Game Awards, but lost to Mortal Kombat.

== See also ==
- WWE 2K Battlegrounds
