= Danny Sullivan's Indy Heat =

1991 video game

- North American arcade flyer
- Developers: Leland Corporation (arcade); Rare (NES); Sales Curve (other formats)
- Publishers: Leland Corporation (arcade); Tradewest (NES); Sales Curve (other formats)
- Composers: Sam Powell (Arcade); David Wise (NES); Tony Williams (Genesis)
- Platforms: Arcade, NES, Amiga, Atari ST, Commodore 64
- Release: Arcade: NA: 1991; NES: NA: August 1992; EU: 1992; Amiga, ST, C64: EU: March 1992
- Genre: Racing
- Modes: Single-player, multiplayer

Danny Sullivan's Indy Heat is a 1991 racing game developed and published in arcades by Leland Corporation. It stars American Indy car driver Danny Sullivan, and features the tracks of the CART series of the early 1990s. Home versions of the game were released for the Nintendo Entertainment System, Amiga, Atari ST, and Commodore 64.

== Gameplay ==
Arcade screenshot

Indy Heat featured three-player capability for the arcade version (four-player capability for the NES), and was similar in gameplay to Ivan 'Ironman' Stewart's Super Off Road. Players earned money based on their race finishing positions, which was spent on improving their car. The race season culminated with the Tradewest Speed Bowl, which loosely resembled the Indianapolis 500.

=== Tracks ===
There are 14 tracks in the arcade version, all of which are based on actual Indy car circuits. The NES port includes nine of those tracks though all were renamed. Pocono, which is based on Pocono Raceway, has been inexplicably moved to Illinois. Indianapolis has been renamed Tradewest after the publisher of the NES version. The NES Michigan track is not the same as the arcade-exclusive track of the same name.

- Phoenix (arcade exclusive): 8 Laps
- Vancouver (West Canada on NES): 5 Laps
- Indianapolis (Tradewest on NES): 8 Laps, 12 Laps on NES and final arcade race
- Long Beach (S. California on NES): 5 Laps
- Detroit (Michigan on NES): 5 Laps
- Pocono (Illinois on NES): 8 Laps
- Cleveland (Ohio on NES): 5 Laps
- East Rutherford/Meadowlands (New Jersey on NES): 5 Laps
- Toronto (East Canada on NES): 5 Laps
- Michigan/Brooklyn (arcade exclusive): 8 Laps
- Lexington/Mid Ohio (arcade exclusive): 5 Laps
- Elkhart Lake (arcade exclusive): 5 Laps
- Cook's/Monterey (arcade exclusive): 5 Laps
- Denver (Colorado on NES): 5 Laps

== Ports ==
The arcade game was later ported by Rare and published by Tradewest for the Nintendo Entertainment System in 1992. Indy Heat was the third NES game to be released that featured an American Indy car driver, the others being Al Unser Jr.'s Turbo Racing and Michael Andretti's World GP. As well as the NES, the game was also ported by The Sales Curve (now Square Enix Europe) for the Amiga, Atari ST and the Commodore 64 the same year. Due to Danny Sullivan's promotion expiring, the racing game was released for the latter simply as "Indy Heat". A Sega Genesis version was developed but never officially published, though a number of reproduction copies were released.

== Reception ==
British gaming magazine The One reviewed the arcade version of Indy Heat in 1991, calling the game's tracks "very prettily constructed" and praising its gameplay, noting how the player may choose to drive carefully to have minimal pit stops, although going slower, or drive "like a maniac" to go faster, but risking breaking down. The One furthermore praises the player's ability to buy upgrades with the prize money from races in-game. The One expressed that "it's this level of dynamic strategy within and between the races that makes this my game of the month".

== See also ==
- Super Sprint
- Super Off Road
