= Empire Earth (mobile game) =

2005 video game

- Developers: WonderPhone, Vivendi Games Mobile
- Publisher: Vivendi Games Mobile
- Series: Empire Earth
- Platform: Mobile game (Java ME)
- Release: October 14, 2005
- Genre: Turn-based strategy
- Modes: Single-player, multiplayer

Empire Earth is a turn-based strategy video game for the cell phone, based on the original Empire Earth. Empire Earth was written in Java form, and was developed by WonderPhone instead of Stainless Steel Studios (the makers of Empire Earth). It was released on October 14, 2005 by mobile games distributor WonderPhone.

== Gameplay ==
Empire Earth is turn-based strategy game. The game covers four epochs; Stone Age, Middle Ages, Modern Age and Nano Age. The game separates itself from the other Empire Earth games with the absence of citizens. Instead, certain symbols lie on the map which can be conquered by a soldier unit. When they are, a new building can be created. However, only a certain number of symbols exist on the map, so each side competes for control of them.

Gameplay in Empire Earth takes place in a turn-based fashion.

Empire Earth gives the player control of four types of units, each that varies and changes in different epochs. The standard soldier, which can be useful for building new structures, ranged units, heavy support units, and aerial units. The latter of the four is only available in later epochs.

Empire Earth has three game modes: adventure, skirmish and multiplayer. Adventure mode takes the player though eight campaign levels, totaling 2,000 years of human history. It begins in the Prehistory and finishes in the Nano Age, similar to other games in the franchise. Skirmish is a free-for-all solo battle, with multiplayer mode introducing the possibility of two player combat.

== Development ==
Empire Earth, upon release, was the seventh Vivendi title to be ported and the one of three that year based on major franchises.

== Reception ==
Empire Earth was well received. IGN gave it a 7.4 out of 10, and commented "Empire Earth Mobile is a slower paced mobile game that's not exactly suited for quick pick-up-and-play sessions." but "If you are looking for a mobile game, though, that is decidedly meatier than, say, solitaire or Tetris, Empire Earth Mobile does offer some solid play." Mobile gamer said "In short, Empire Earth is an interesting new take on strategy" and "it's not difficult to recommend."
