= Off Road Challenge =

1997 video game

- Developers: Midway Studios San Diego (Arcade); Avalanche Software (N64)
- Publishers: Midway; GT Interactive (European release)
- Composer: Rob Atesalp
- Platforms: Arcade, Nintendo 64
- Release: Arcade: NA: September 1997; Nintendo 64: NA: June 30, 1998; PAL: September 15, 1998
- Genre: Racing
- Modes: Single-player, multiplayer
- Arcade system: Midway V Unit Software

Off Road Challenge is a video game developed and published by Midway. The game was originally released in 1997 for arcades using the Midway V Unit hardware. It is part of the Off Road series which began with Ivan 'Ironman' Stewart's Super Off Road.

The game was released for the Nintendo 64 in 1998. The Nintendo 64 conversion was developed by Avalanche Software and published by Midway, and includes several unlockable tracks and an added circuit mode.

== Gameplay ==
The levels are mostly offroad tracks, sometimes containing urban areas. The game features a vehicle tuning system that allows the player to purchase upgrades to suspension, tires, "acceleration", and various other performance items. It also features power-ups which the player drives over, such as nitro, crash helmets (to prevent the player from losing speed when colliding with others) and money. Treasure Chests and Nitro Capsules can be found lying on the ground during the race. Players race against seven other opponents. There are various obstacles depending on the track, such as wagon carts, a train, water slicks, and trees. The top four places earn cash, with first place being the most rewarding. The faster the player finishes, the better chance the player has to make a new record on the top ten leaderboard.

The game has six tracks, ranging in difficulty from beginner, to intermediate, to advanced.

Up to four cabinets can be linked together for players to race against each other.

== Development ==
Off Road Challenge was developed at the Cinematronics/Leland Corporation office in San Diego, with a team of designers led by Mike Hunley.

The game was housed in the same model cabinet as used for Midway's two previous racing games, Cruis'n World and San Francisco Rush: Extreme Racing.

== Reception ==
Reception

Aggregate score
Aggregator	Score
GameRankings	53.6%

Review scores
Publication	Score
GameSpot	4.5/10
IGN	2.5/10
N64 Magazine	21%

IGN gave the Nintendo 64 version of Off Road Challenge a 2.5 out of 10 criticising the graphics as "dated with most objects having blurry sprites, the textures being muddy and the framerates being low" and the presentation saying that the menus that were directly ported from the arcade slowed down.
