= NFL Head Coach 09 =

2008 video game

- Developer: EA Tiburon
- Publisher: EA Sports
- Series: Madden NFL
- Engine: Proprietary
- Platforms: PlayStation 3, Xbox 360
- Release: Bundle with Madden 09: August 12, 2008; Standalone: September 2, 2008; PlayStation Store: September 4, 2008
- Genre: Sports management game
- Mode: Single player

NFL Head Coach 09 is the follow-up to NFL Head Coach for the Xbox 360 and PlayStation 3. The game was released on August 12, 2008. The game is available in the 20th Anniversary Collector's Edition of Madden NFL 09, and was released as a standalone game on September 2, 2008. A large group of fans were also petitioning for a PAL (European) version of the game because the original game was released only in America.

Tony Dungy from Indianapolis Colts replaces Bill Cowher as the cover head coach while Adam Schefter and Todd McShay provide commentary on upcoming draft picks and Adam Schefter provides the only commentary after and before the off-season and during the season including pre-season. Todd McShay only commentates during the Mock Draft and the NFL Draft.

== Bundle with Madden NFL 09 ==
Electronic Arts announced in a press release that NFL Head Coach 09 would be available in the Madden NFL 09 20th Anniversary Collector's Edition, claiming, "If we shipped Head Coach alone, it would be a full-priced SKU. But if we pack it in, we can reduce the price and make it a bonus to our fans... On the first Head Coach, we think it was a great concept, and as far as we've taken it, to be able to pack that in and pass on those savings to our consumers, if you can have one awesome pack like this -- we're really fired up." Two weeks later, EA announced a standalone version would be available three weeks after Madden's release.

== New features ==
Unlike the previous title, the player can upgrade the staff by using skill points, from which they can spend on either Skills or Special Skills. The NFL Draft was redone. Instead of the usual 7 draft picks, the player can only pick if they have a draft pick. The player can make their own plays in the play creator and also watch live events from around the league. Players also have to deal with Game Changers: they differentiate from Study Session to Potential Changers; some Game Changers are good and some are bad.

== Features changed ==
- Trading System is a bidding system.
- Contracts are preset packages.
- Overall based on skills and special skills.
- No Hall of Legends and no Coach Corridor.

== Career Mode ==
The player creates a coach of their own or uses a preset coach from the 2008 head coach roster in the game. Bill Belichick is the only of 32 NFL coaches to not be included in the game. During the career, the player will deal with negotiations, sign players, upgrade staff with skill points, trade players, change teams, change philosophy, cut players, win and lose games, and also dealing with workouts during the off season with college players. The length of the career varies depending on which of the 4 draft paths the player gets, but ranges from 13 to 15 years.

== Teams and stadiums ==
The teams consist of the usual 32 NFL teams. The Stadiums include all 32 NFL teams plus the Aloha Stadium which hosts the Pro Bowl games.

== See also ==
- Front Office Football
- Madden NFL 09
- NFL Head Coach
