= Freaky Flyers =

2003 video game

- PAL cover art
- Developer: Midway Studios San Diego (Note: GameCube port developed by Point of View.)
- Publisher: Midway
- Director: Kevin Munroe
- Designer: Tom Tanaka
- Composer: David Norris
- Platforms: GameCube, PlayStation 2, Xbox
- Release: NA: August 4, 2003; EU: October 10, 2003
- Genre: Racing
- Modes: Single player, multiplayer

Freaky Flyers is a 2003 air racing video game developed internally by Midway Studios San Diego for the Xbox and PlayStation 2, while the version for the GameCube was developed by Point of View and published by Midway.

== Gaming modes ==
- Freaky Flyers adventure mode follows multiple character histories. Each character has a story that develops as the player completes various challenges and missions.
- Racing Mode can be played by either one or two players. As the game has been designed for comic effect, many of the tracks contain impossible missions and unorthodox challenges.
- Dog Fight mode is duelling. This mode is only available in two-player mode. The players attempt to shoot each other out of the sky.

Minigames are also included in the game. These involve various challenges, such as shooting "amigos" in the desert or rescuing non-playable characters.

== Development ==
Freaky Flyers had a protracted development cycle. It was initially to be published by SCi Games, who demonstrated it at the 1997 European Computer Trade Show (ECTS). It was released for the Xbox and PlayStation 2, before a two-disc GameCube port was issued shortly afterwards.

== Reception ==
Reception

Aggregate score
Aggregator	Score		
Aggregator	GameCube	PS2	Xbox
Metacritic	69/100	66/100	64/100

Review scores
Publication	Score		
Publication	GameCube	PS2	Xbox
Electronic Gaming Monthly	N/A	N/A	4/10
Game Informer	N/A	6/10	5.75/10
GamePro	N/A	4/5	4/5
GameRevolution	C	C	C
GameSpot	6.6/10	6.6/10	6.6/10
GameSpy	3/5	3/5	N/A
GameZone	7.3/10	7.3/10	7.2/10
IGN	7/10	7/10	7/10
Nintendo Power	3.8/5	N/A	N/A
Official U.S. PlayStation Magazine	N/A	3.5/5	N/A
Official Xbox Magazine (US)	N/A	N/A	7.9/10

The game received "mixed or average reviews" on all platforms according to the review aggregation website Metacritic. Areas that were praised include the large cast of characters and over 90 minutes of pre-rendered cutscenes included in the game. However, the game was criticized for its slow racing speeds and repetitive character lines and music.

Jeff Gerstmann of GameSpot noted that "The game does have its moments, but the racing simply isn't very exciting."
