= Rick Goodman =

American video game developer (born 1955)

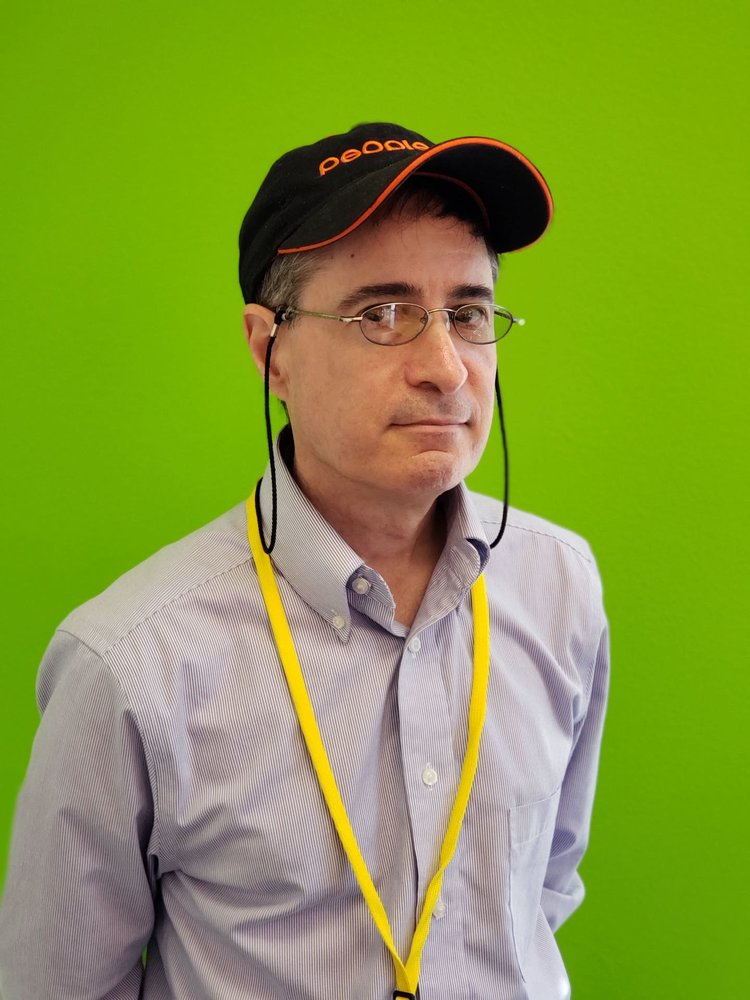
- Goodman at PeopleFun
- Born: October 28, 1955 (age 71); United States
- Occupation: Video game designer

Rick Goodman is a video game designer and the founder and owner of the now-defunct Stainless Steel Studios. He is best known for the real-time strategy (RTS) games he designed, such as Age of Empires and Empire Earth.

== Career ==
In 1995 Goodman co-founded Ensemble Studios together with his brother, Tony Goodman, and John Boog-Scott. Their first project was Age of Empires (AoE), in which Goodman worked as Lead Designer. After the game's release, it became an overnight sensation and Goodman became one of the most recognized game developers in the world. Because of the success of the game, some said that Goodman had invented in AoE "the most well recognized game interface for RTS games", because afterward many games like it began to use the AoE game interface: a mini map, unit and building controls, the name of your civilization and the age which you are currently in on top of the screen and others.

After Age of Empires, Goodman left Ensemble to form his own studio with Dara-Lynn Pelechatz: Stainless Steel Studios in 1998. Pelechatz told GameSpy that Goodman couldn't decide what name to give for his studio, so he opened a catalog with the plan to baptise the studio with the very first thing he encountered.

In 2001, Stainless Steel, under Goodman, created Empire Earth. The game, which was published by Sierra Entertainment, offered many new features, including a 3D view of the world, impressive zoom-in and zoom-out features, and a timeline that spanned from pre-history to the twenty-second century (over 500,000 years). The game won the GameSpy PC "Game-of-the-Year 2001" Award. According to some, Empire Earth was what Goodman wanted Age of Empires to be. PC Gamer said in an article about Empire Earth that it feels like it's the gold edition of the entire AoE series.

Goodman would soon break up with Sierra and start working on a new game, Empires: Dawn of the Modern World. The game is very similar to Goodman's previous successes, except the game spans only a millennium of entire history of humanity, from 950 to 1950, which developers thought to be the most pivotal years in human history. The game was released in 2003 and published by Activision. Although it wasn't much of a hit, the game was rated by some reviews and websites higher than Empire Earth.

After Empires, Goodman licensed the Empire Earth game engine to Tilted Mill Entertainment for its development of Immortal Cities: Children of the Nile which was published by Myelin Media in US and SEGA in Europe. It was first released in November 2004.

Goodman's last game was Rise and Fall: Civilizations at War published and partially developed by Midway Games and released on July 12, 2006.

Goodman is currently a board member of 8D World, which built a virtual world where Chinese children learn English.

Goodman currently works at PeopleFun as an executive producer with his brother Tony.

== Stainless Steel Studios ==
At the end of November 2005, with only weeks to go before release of "Rise and Fall", Stainless Steel Studios closed abruptly. He reportedly told Gamestar that after the PC strategy game's release was pushed from October to early 2006, Midway cut off advances to Stainless Steel, which in turn had to lay off its staff due to lack of funding. Midway had stated in a report that it would continue to work on the game and did eventually release it in June 2006.

== Portfolio ==
Rick Goodman has taken part in developing many games:

Year released	Game title	Developers	Publisher
1997	Age of Empires	Ensemble Studios	Microsoft Game Studios
1998	Age of Empires: The Rise of Rome	Ensemble Studios	Microsoft Game Studios
2001	Empire Earth	Stainless Steel Studios	Sierra Entertainment
2003	Empires: Dawn of the Modern World	Stainless Steel Studios	Activision
2004	Immortal Cities: Children of the Nile	Tilted Mill Entertainment	Myelin Media (US); SEGA (Europe)
2006	Rise and Fall: Civilizations at War	Stainless Steel Studios	Midway Games
2006	Caesar IV	Tilted Mill Entertainment	Sierra Entertainment
