= Fire Blade (video game) =

2002 video game

- North American PS2 cover art
- Developer: Kuju Entertainment
- Publisher: Midway
- Platforms: Xbox, GameCube, PlayStation 2
- Release: PlayStation 2: NA: June 18, 2002; PAL: June 28, 2002; Xbox: NA: November 17, 2002; PAL: February 28, 2003; GameCube: NA: December 29, 2002; PAL: February 7, 2003
- Genre: Flight simulation
- Modes: Single-player, multiplayer

Fire Blade is a flight simulation video game released by Kuju Entertainment for PlayStation 2, Xbox and GameCube in 2002. In the game, the player takes control of an advanced helicopter gunship as a part of the Fire Blade task force, which in the arc of the game's story is responsible for fighting terrorism. The enemies of the game are the United Eastern States, who are believed to be building terrorist training camps and factories for weapons of mass destruction.

== Gameplay ==
The game is similar in many respects to ThunderHawk: Operation Phoenix. However, in Fire Blade, the player is forced to be far less cautious unless on a stealth mission and is usually pitted against far larger numbers of enemies. The main element of the game is aggressively piloting the player's attack helicopters against large enemy armored formations and completing the main mission objectives, these vary in creativity from simply blowing up a bridge to aiding a special forces team in stopping a train by parking a truck across the tracks and stopping enemy troops from moving it.

A secondary element of the game is FPS-style sniping, when the player's helicopter enters "stealth mode" the autocannon is used as a precision sniper weapon that can be used to accurately target individual soldiers, allowing the player to snipe enemy infantry much like in an FPS.

Additional fuel and ammunition for the helicopter's jet boosters and heavier armaments are acquired from destroyed enemy vehicles instead of the more conventional reloading areas from games such as the Strike Series.

== Reception ==
Reception

Aggregate score
Aggregator	Score		
Aggregator	GameCube	PS2	Xbox
Metacritic	70/100	64/100	71/100

Review scores
Publication	Score		
Publication	GameCube	PS2	Xbox
AllGame	N/A	2/5	N/A
Edge	N/A	6/10	N/A
Electronic Gaming Monthly	N/A	4/10	N/A
Game Informer	N/A	7.5/10	N/A
GamePro	N/A	2/5	N/A
GameRevolution	N/A	B−	N/A
GameSpot	N/A	7.6/10	N/A
GameSpy	N/A	75%	N/A
GameZone	N/A	7.7/10	N/A
IGN	N/A	7.7/10	7.3/10
Nintendo Power	3.2/5	N/A	N/A
Official U.S. PlayStation Magazine	N/A	2.5/5	N/A
Maxim	N/A	7/10	N/A

The game received "mixed or average reviews" on all platforms according to the review aggregation website Metacritic.
