= Madden NFL 09 =

2008 video game

- Cover art featuring Brett Favre in a Packers uniform
- Developer: EA Tiburon
- Publisher: EA Sports
- Series: Madden NFL
- Platforms: Xbox; Xbox 360; PlayStation 2 PlayStation 3 PlayStation Portable; Wii; Nintendo DS; Mobile phone
- Release: NA: August 12, 2008; AU: August 14, 2008 (PS2, PS3, PSP, X360); EU: August 15, 2008 (DS, PS2, PS3, PSP, Wii, X360); AU: August 21, 2008 (Wii); NA: September 25, 2008 (Mobile); JP: September 25, 2008 (PS3, X360)
- Genre: Sports
- Modes: Single-player, multiplayer

Madden NFL 09 is an American football video game based on the NFL that was published by EA Sports and developed by EA Tiburon. It is the nineteenth annual installment in the Madden NFL video game franchise. The game was released for the Nintendo DS, PlayStation 2, PlayStation 3, PlayStation Portable, Wii, Xbox, Xbox 360, and mobile phones. It was the last video game for the original Xbox, and the last Madden game to be released for the Nintendo DS.

Unlike the previous versions, the game was not released for the PC. EA Sports has said that they are "retooling the PC version" after not making 09. Despite these claims of 'retooling', PC users were again ignored the following for most of the 2010s as no Windows version of Madden NFL 10 to Madden NFL 18 were released. In June 2008, EA Sports announced that for the year 2009, the Madden NFL, NCAA Football, NASCAR, NHL, NBA Live, and Tiger Woods PGA Tour series would not be shipped for Microsoft Windows.

The Wii version of the game is titled Madden NFL 09 All-Play and was launched under EA Sports' new All-Play brand exclusive to the platform, taking a slightly different approach to the game and taking advantage of the motion controls.

The game features quarterback Brett Favre on the cover. When the game was announced, Favre had retired as a member of the Green Bay Packers, making him the first non-active player to be the cover athlete. However, a week before its release, he came out of retirement and was traded to the New York Jets. As a result, an alternative cover was made available.

The 20th Anniversary Collector's Edition of Madden NFL 09 includes NFL Head Coach 09, an alternative case, an exclusive version of John Madden Football '93 with updated teams and rosters and bonus video content and clips. A demo of the game was released on Xbox Live Marketplace and PlayStation Network. The standard version and the anniversary package were released on August 12, 2008. A Spanish-language version of the game was released on September 17, 2008 for the PlayStation 3 and Xbox 360 platforms, featuring ESPN Deportes announcer Álvaro Martín.

== Cover athlete ==
On April 23, 2008, David Letterman revealed that former Green Bay Packers quarterback Brett Favre would be the cover athlete of Madden NFL 09 on the Late Show with David Letterman. Despite Favre's later unretirement and trade to the New York Jets about five days before Madden NFL 09 was officially released in North America, the game's cover still featured Favre wearing a Packers uniform. Instead of reissuing the packaging completely, on August 12, 2008, EA made available a free alternative cover of Favre in a Jets uniform from their website that players were able to download and print. At first the new covers were available for all the consoles except the Xbox, Nintendo DS, and Wii, which use an alternate cover. On September 15, 2008, EA made available a cover shot specifically for the Wii that had Brett Favre as a Jet.

Favre was a playable character in every version of Madden NFL 09 except the Nintendo DS version. On the Wii, PSP, and PS2 editions, he was not on the Jets roster, but available on a historic team, the 2007 Packers. Players could transfer Favre to the free agent roster pool, and pick him up on any of the 32 NFL teams for the 2008 season. A roster update for the PS3 and Xbox 360 versions on August 12, 2008 placed Favre on the New York Jets roster as their starting quarterback.

Like all other games of EA Sports' 09 season, the "All Play" version of Madden seen on the Wii features a different photograph of Favre with different graphics and artwork than the other versions of the game.

The Anniversary Collector's Edition does not feature a cover athlete - it has a larger version of the Roman numeral XX logo shown in the top-left corner of the game's standard cover. This edition of the game was only released in North America.

Roberto Garza, a guard for the Chicago Bears, is the cover athlete for the Spanish version, Madden NFL 09 en Español.

== Presentation ==
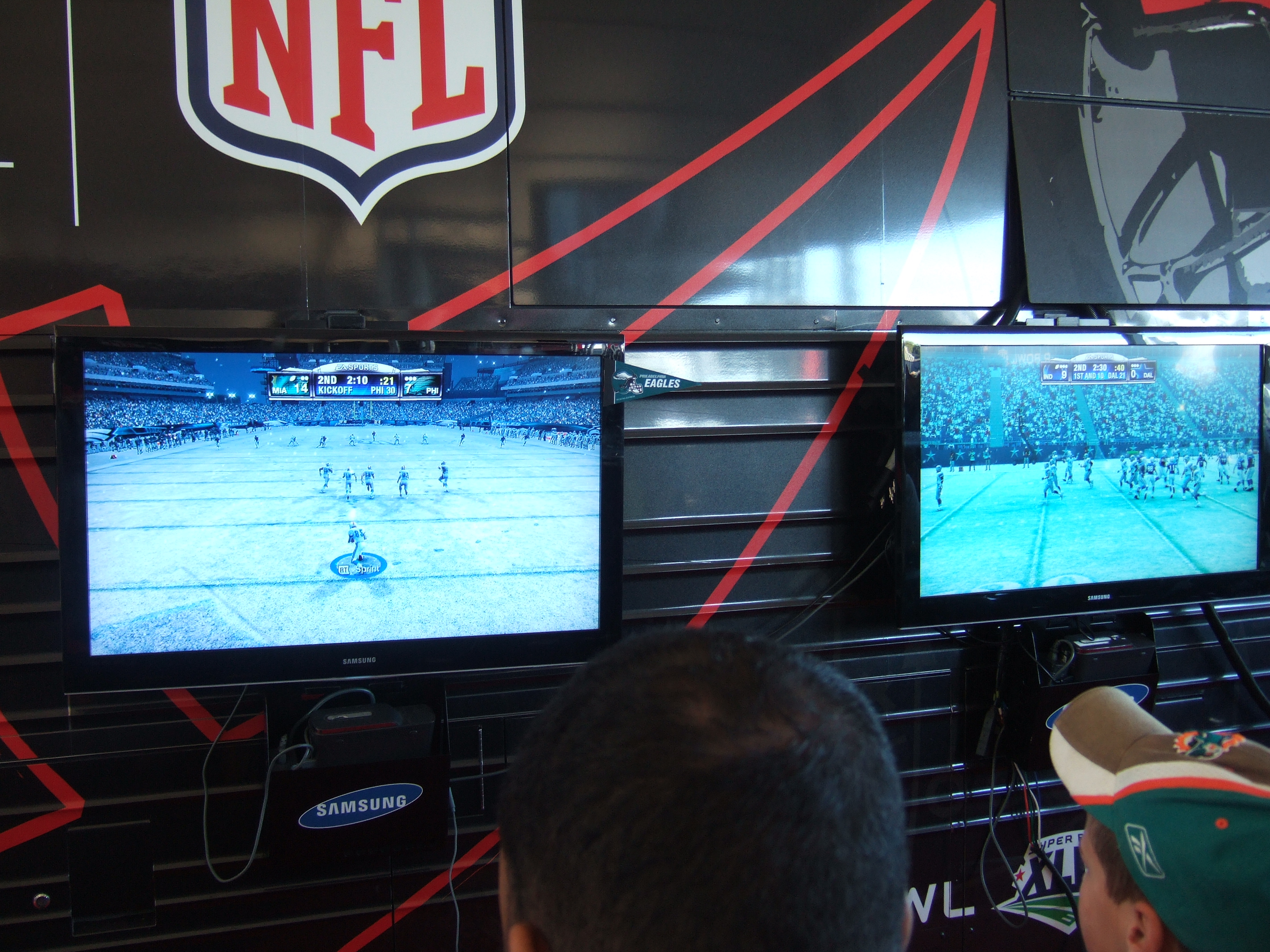
Madden NFL 09 gameplay at Super Bowl XLIII's NFL Experience

Play-by-play and color commentary is provided by Tom Hammond and Cris Collinsworth, respectively. Al Michaels and John Madden are still the play-by-play and color commentary for the Wii, PS2, Xbox, and PSP versions. EA designers have confirmed that John Madden does play a part in Madden 09 as the person describing instructions to the Madden IQ. Madden guides the player on advice and other things to help raise his or her Madden IQ. Madden also appears in Mii form in the Wii version of the game, suggesting plays to run in the game's "Madden's Pick" feature, with a specific reason so new players can learn to call their own plays. Lastly, Madden appears at the start of a game where he describes the teams and the matchup.

EA's relationship with ESPN also enables tie-ins with different ESPN shows.

The quarterback's passing cone, which debuted in Madden NFL 06 and fans disliked, disappeared in Madden NFL 09.

The game's soundtrack features 26 songs from various artists such as Shinedown, Disturbed, Innerpartysystem, The Offspring, Trivium, Wale, Kardinal Offishal, Linkin Park, K'naan, Gym Class Heroes and Busta Rhymes.

== Reception ==
Reception

Aggregate scores
Aggregator	Score						
Aggregator	DS	PS2	PS3	PSP	Wii	Xbox	Xbox 360
GameRankings	66.50%	70.33%	86.45%	65.67%	81.78%	80%	84.67%
Metacritic	66/100	67/100	85/100	68/100	82/100	80/100	83/100

Review scores
Publication	Score						
Publication	DS	PS2	PS3	PSP	Wii	Xbox	Xbox 360
Destructoid	N/A	N/A	7.5/10	N/A	N/A	N/A	7/10
Eurogamer	N/A	N/A	N/A	N/A	N/A	N/A	7/10
Game Informer	N/A	N/A	8.25/10	N/A	N/A	N/A	8.25/10
GamePro	N/A	N/A	4.5/5	N/A	N/A	N/A	4.5/5
GameRevolution	N/A	N/A	N/A	N/A	N/A	N/A	C+
GameSpot	N/A	N/A	8/10	N/A	7/10	N/A	8/10
GameSpy	N/A	N/A	4/5	N/A	4/5	N/A	4/5
GameTrailers	N/A	N/A	8.7/10	N/A	N/A	N/A	8.7/10
GameZone	N/A	N/A	8.8/10 (Es.) 8.7/10	N/A	8/10	N/A	8.9/10
IGN	7/10	7/10	8.8/10	7/10	8.6/10	N/A	8.8/10
Nintendo Power	N/A	N/A	N/A	N/A	9/10	N/A	N/A
Official Xbox Magazine (US)	N/A	N/A	N/A	N/A	N/A	8/10	9/10
PlayStation: The Official Magazine	N/A	N/A	4/5	N/A	N/A	N/A	N/A
411Mania	N/A	N/A	N/A	N/A	8.5/10	N/A	8.5/10
The A.V. Club	N/A	N/A	B	N/A	N/A	N/A	N/A

Madden NFL 09 was met with positive reception upon release. GameRankings and Metacritic gave it a score of 86.45% and 85 out of 100 for the PlayStation 3 version; 84.67% and 83 out of 100 for the Xbox 360 version; 81.78% and 82 out of 100 for the Wii version; 80% and 80 out of 100 for the Xbox version; 70.33% and 67 out of 100 for the PlayStation 2 version; 66.50% and 66 out of 100 for the DS version; and 65.67% and 68 out of 100 for the PSP version. IGN gave the Mobile phone version a score of 7.9 out of 10 and stated, "We're a little deep in the season right now, but if you still need to surround yourself with football, this mobile game is a good way to fill those down moments." During the 12th Annual Interactive Achievement Awards, the Academy of Interactive Arts & Sciences nominated Madden NFL 09 for "Sports Game of the Year".

As of September 30, 2008, the game has sold 4.5 million copies, according to Electronic Arts. According to the NPD Group, GfK Chart-Track, and Enterbrain, the game has sold 2.958 million copies in the United States, 35,000 in the United Kingdom, and 1,000 in Japan, respectively, for a total of 2.994 million copies as of October 1, 2008. The Xbox 360 version was the 18th best-selling game of December 2008 in the United States. It was also the ninth best-selling game of 2008, selling in excess of 1.87 million copies. The PlayStation 2, 3, and Portable versions were the second, seventh, and first best-selling games respectively for their respective consoles of December 2008 in the United States.

== Issues ==
Shortly after the release of Madden NFL 09, consumers began reporting several freezing errors in the Xbox 360 and PlayStation 3 versions of the game. EA confirmed the issue, and stated that they would work on a patch for the two consoles to locate the source of the freezing and fix the issue. However, this problem caused many players to doubt the advantages of games being able to be patched on consoles, and instead players criticized this 'feature' for allowing companies to rush games and rely on post-release patches to fix the issues that consumers themselves find.
