= Super Off Road =

1989 video game

- ZX Spectrum box art
- Developer: Leland Corporation (Note: NES version developed by Rare; home computer and Master System versions developed by Graftgold; SNES and Genesis/Mega Drive versions developed by Software Creations; Game Boy version developed by NMS Software.)
- Publishers: Leland Corporation: NES; NA: Tradewest; PAL: Nintendo Home computers, Game Gear, Master System Virgin Games Super NES Tradewest Genesis/Mega Drive Ballistic Lynx Telegames
- Designer: John Morgan
- Programmers: John Morgan; Earl Stratton
- Composer: Sam Powell: NES David Wise Home computers Jason Page Super NES Tim Follin Genesis/Mega Drive Tony Williams Game Boy Mark Cooksey
- Platform: Arcade: NES, Amiga, Amstrad CPC, Atari ST, Commodore 64, IBM PC, ZX Spectrum, Super NES, Genesis/Mega Drive, Game Boy, Game Gear, Master System, Atari Lynx
- Release: February 1989: Arcade; NA: February 1989 NES; NA: April 1990; PAL: March 14, 1991 Home computers; EU: October 1990 Super NES; NA: December 1991; PAL: June 24, 1993 Genesis/Mega Drive; NA: 1992; EU: April 15, 1992 Game Boy; NA/EU: September 1992 Game Gear; EU: December 12, 1992; NA: January 1993 Master System; EU: September 1993 Lynx; NA: 1993; EU: 1993
- Genre: Racing
- Modes: Single-player, multiplayer

Ivan 'Ironman' Stewart's Super Off Road is a 1989 racing video game developed and published by Leland Corporation for arcades. It was designed and managed by John Morgan, who was also lead programmer, and endorsed by professional off-road racer Ivan Stewart. Virgin Games produced several home computer versions in 1990, with a version for the Nintendo Entertainment System released by Leland's Tradewest subsidiary the same year. It was followed by versions for most major home consoles, including the Master System, Sega Genesis, and Super Nintendo Entertainment System. A port for the Atari Jaguar was announced but never released. Some ports lack the Ivan Stewart branding because of licensing issues, and are known simply as Super Off Road.

== Gameplay ==
Arcade version screenshot

In the game, up to three players (four in the NES version through use of either the NES Satellite or NES Four Score) compete against each other or the computer in racing around several top-view indoor off-road truck tracks of increasing difficulty. There are eight different tracks (twelve in the SMS version and sixteen in the SNES version) and 99 races altogether on most versions (the SNES version loops through 64 races without ending). All races are raced more than once. First place results earn the player points to continue in the championship and money with which to upgrade their truck or buy more nitro. The goal is to reach the end of the season with the most money earned. Continues are available but whereas players can get extra money in the arcade version, in the home versions, the player's money is reset to zero. This is one of the first games where the player could upgrade their vehicle by earning points or money, an idea conceived by John Morgan (although in Atari Games' Sprint series, the player could upgrade their racer using wrenches), a system that is used in many racing games today.

== Development ==
Super Off Road was developed and published by the Leland Corporation (which was acquired by WMS Industries, the holding company of said developers, in 1994).

In the original arcade game, the red, blue, and yellow CPU trucks are "driven" by "Madman" Sam Powell, "Hurricane" Earl Stratton, and "Jammin'" John Morgan, respectively. The names were taken from the development staff: Sam composed the music. John was the game designer and manager, lead programmer, initial track designer and wrote ray tracing software to create all vehicle art. Earl was the assistant software programmer, Hartono Titro was diagnostics programmer. The Track Pak added "Steamin'" Steve High and "Hot Rod" John Rowe, representing graphics and company ownership, respectively. By using these names, this meant that further licensing deals were not required.

== Ports ==
The Super NES version prominently features the Toyota brand. The name and logo are displayed on various tracks and pre-race music was inspired by the "I love what you do for me Toyota" jingle that was used by the company's marketing campaign at the time of the game's release. This version also lacked any licensing or reference to Ivan Stewart, replacing him instead with the late Mickey Thompson in the gray truck (primarily without approval from Danny Thompson). The NES version does have the Toyota label on its cartridge art, but otherwise the ad is not present.

== Track Pack ==
Screenshot of Ivan "Ironman" Stewart's Super Off Road Track Pak

The Track Pak, released in 1989, is an add-on board for arcade cabinets with eight new tracks: Shortcut, Cutoff Pass, Pig Bog, Rio Trio, Leapin' Lizards, Redoubt About, Boulder Hill, and Volcano Valley. It also adds the ability for players to choose between the regular truck and the dune buggy.

== Reception ==
Reception

Aggregate score
Aggregator	Score
GameRankings	64.12% (SNES)

Review score
Publication	Score
Electronic Gaming Monthly	(NES) 7/10, 7/10, 7/10, 8/10 (SNES) 7/10, 6/10, 6/10, 7/10

Awards
Publication	Award
Crash	Crash Smash
Sinclair User	SU Classic
Your Sinclair	Megagame

Replay Magazine rated the arcade version #1 Dedicated Video in its 1989's Best Videos and Pins Special Report.

Sinclair User rated the arcade version an 8 out of 10 and recommended the game to anyone who enjoyed playing the Sprint games, calling Super Off Road "Super Sprint with dirt".

The Spectrum version of the game was voted number 47 in the Your Sinclair Readers' Top 100 Games of All Time. The game was ranked the 35th best game of all time by Amiga Power. MegaTech gave the game a score of 83%

Electronic Gaming Monthly gave the Lynx version a 3.75 out of 10, commenting that though Super Off Road was an excellent arcade game, the choppy animation and scrolling in the Lynx version make it almost unplayable.

== Legacy ==
=== Re-releases ===
Both the arcade version of the game and the Track Pak upgrade are included in Midway Arcade Treasures 3 for the PlayStation 2 and Xbox. It drops the "Ironman" Ivan Stewart license and as simply known as Super Off Road, with the white, computer-controlled car being "driven" by "'Lightning' Kevin Lydy" (in the original arcade cabinet, the white car is "driven" by Ivan Stewart), a real-life graphic designer on the original arcade game, continuing the previous tradition regarding the CPU drivers being named for its developers.

Super Off Road is also included in the 2012 compilation Midway Arcade Origins for the PlayStation 3 and Xbox 360.

=== Sequels ===
The home sequel Super Off Road: The Baja, programmed by John Morgan, was released for the SNES in 1993 and is based on the Baja 1000 race. A Mega Drive version of Off Road: The Baja was also planned but never released. The format was changed to a third-person camera instead of an overhead camera.

In 1997, an arcade sequel, Off Road Challenge, was released, which again adopted the third-person 3D driving view, and was ported to the Nintendo 64 in 1998. The second sequel, Offroad Thunder, was released in arcades in 1999

== See also ==
- Super Sprint (1986)
- Danny Sullivan's Indy Heat (1991)
