= Legion: The Legend of Excalibur =

2002 action role-playing video game

- Developer: 7 Studios
- Publisher: Midway Games
- Producers: Lewis Peterson; Scot Kramarich; David Brooks
- Designers: Erik Yeo; Ryan Lockhart; Lisa Farina
- Artists: Craig Rundels; Damion Conn; Barclay Chantel
- Writer: Margaret Stohl
- Composer: Riptide Music
- Platform: PlayStation 2
- Release: NA: June 17, 2002; UK: September 27, 2002
- Genres: Real-time strategy, action role-playing
- Mode: Single-player

Legion: The Legend of Excalibur is a real-time strategy / action role-playing video game hybrid developed by the ex-Westwood Studios 7 Studios and published by Midway Games for the PlayStation 2 in 2002. The game tells the story of the young King Arthur to save the kingdom from the evil sorceress Morgan and was given mostly poor or mediocre reviews by critics.

== Development ==
The game was developed by 7 Studios, a company founded in 1999.

== Plot ==
Legion: The Legend of Excalibur begins with the dark sorceress Queen Morgan le Fay attacking and slaying her father Uther Pendragon to take over the Kingdom of Camelot. Her good young half-brother King Arthur claims the right to the throne by pulling the magic sword Excalibur out of the stone and sets off to gather the forces of good (including the warrior Lady Gwenevere, the wizard Merlin, the sorceress Nimue, and the knights Sir Lancelot, Sir Percival and Sir Galahad), defeat Morgan's supernatural armies (led by the Red Knight, the Green Knight, and the Black Knight, and King Lot), and eventually to avenge his father.

== Reception ==
Reception

Aggregate scores
Aggregator	Score
GameRankings	57.89%
Metacritic	51/100

Review scores
Publication	Score
GameRevolution	1.5/5
GameSpot	3.8/10
GameZone	6.7/10
IGN	7.8/10

Legion: The Legend of Excalibur was met with generally mixed or average critical reception, including the averaged scores of 51/100 at Metacritic and 57.89% at GameRankings. Chris Carle of IGN gave it a positive review and a score 7.8/10, stating that "nothing like Legion currently exists on the PlayStation 2" to be such a mix of genres, and opining that "in the end, Legion is a solid game that is worth playing through once. It may lose its steam after that, but it's a fun mix of action, strategy and RPG. Fans of Gauntlet, Baldur's Gate: Dark Alliance and Diablo might want to give it a look." On the other hand, Jeff Gerstmann of GameSpot gave it only 3.8/10, opining "Legion has many sound concepts, but just about everything falls apart in the execution, resulting in a game that runs the gamut from frustrating to just plain terrible." Other reviews included C− from Game Revolution, 3/10 from RPGamer, 3/10 from PlayStation World, 6.7/10 from GameZone, 9/20 from Jeuxvideo.com, and 66% from 4Players.
