= Empires: Dawn of the Modern World =

2003 video game

- North American boxart
- Developer: Stainless Steel Studios
- Publisher: Activision
- Designers: Rick Goodman; Jon Alenson; Richard Bishop
- Composers: Scott Morgan; Guy Whitmore
- Series: Empire Earth
- Engine: Titan
- Platform: Windows
- Release: NA: October 21, 2003; EU: October 24, 2003
- Genre: Real-time strategy
- Modes: Single-player, multiplayer

Empires: Dawn of the Modern World is a 2003 real-time strategy video game developed by Stainless Steel Studios and published by Activision. Set in a world-historical period that extends from the Middle Ages to World War II, the game tasks players with guiding one of nine rival great civilizations to victory. The game contains both a single player campaign as well as multiplayer gameplay mode.

Customer surveys from Stainless Steel's previous game, Empire Earth, were used as a starting point for Empires: these inspired the team to take a more minimalist design approach, and to include civilizations without overlapping styles of play. Development was led by designer Rick Goodman who felt that historical realism often constrained gameplay rather than be a source of inspiration.

Empires was positively received by critics, who enjoyed its multiplayer component. However, certain reviewers disliked its single-player mode, and opinion clashed on the game's level of uniqueness compared to competitors such as Rise of Nations. The sales of Empires, when combined with those of Empire Earth, totaled 2.5 million units by 2004.

== Gameplay ==
The Koreans defending their base against an attack.

Empires: Dawn of the Modern World is a real-time strategy (RTS) game in which the player guides a civilization through five historical periods, from the Middle Ages to World War II. As in many RTS titles, the player collects natural resources, erects buildings, and trains and maintains a military. Players use a mouse cursor interface (or hotkeys) to direct their units, which range from crossbowmen to King Tiger tanks. A three-dimensional (3D) camera system allows the player to view the action from any perspective, including isometric and first-person angles. A mini-map is included as well.

Each of the nine civilizations features a unique style of play: for example, the French and English have powerful defensive capabilities, while Chinese structures are mobile. During a match, the player must gather resources to progress their civilization to a new historical era, after which more advanced technologies and units (land-, sea- and airborne) become available. Four civilizations are playable from the medieval to the Imperial age; at the beginning of World War I, the player transitions their civilization to one of the remaining five. For example, a player of the premodern Franks must transition to modern Germany or France. The player wins a match by destroying all opponents' means of production, or by constructing and successfully defending a "Wonder", such as the Notre-Dame de Paris or Brandenburg Gate.

Empires allows up to eight players (or artificially intelligent opponents) to compete in two modes: the shorter, battle-oriented Action mode or the longer, defense-oriented Empire Builder mode. In addition, the game contains three single-player storylines called "campaigns", each of which depicts major events in a civilization's history. These follow Richard the Lionheart's medieval wars in France; Admiral Yi Sun-Sin's defense of Korea against Japanese invasion in the early modern period; and General George S. Patton's exploits during World War II. The editor used to create Empires is packaged with the game, which allows the player to create original levels and campaign scenarios.

== Development ==
=== Conception ===
In the past, historical realism has tended to constrain game play to a finite set of established conventions, which have been used again and again. At Stainless Steel, we felt that history had provided us with a vast wealth of inspiration for incredibly exciting game play. History should not be limiting at all. In fact, just the opposite is true.

— Rick Goodman

Stainless Steel Studios started work on Empires in 2002. The project was led by company head Rick Goodman, designer of Ensemble Studios' Age of Empires and Stainless Steel's earlier Empire Earth. The Empires team began by studying their previous game for features that could be reused or improved. In addition, they mined history books for interesting "events, battle tactics, weapons, technologies and economic factors", according to Goodman. A list was drafted of 100 historical elements that excited the team, and it formed the basis of the project. Although a heavy focus was placed on historical accuracy, designer Richard Bishop explained that "fun always comes first." As it had with Empire Earth, Stainless Steel delegated separate teams to the multiplayer and single-player modes of Empires.

Further inspiration came from surveys of Empire Earth players, conducted during 2002. For example, the team found that Empire Earth's medieval and World War II periods were the most popular, while its futuristic and prehistoric periods were the least. In response, the team reduced the span of Empires to 1,000 years, from the Middle Ages until World War II. Goodman believed that this could make the game many times deeper than Empire Earth. Also requested by players were fully unique civilizations, without overlapping units or styles of play—a feature that Goodman claimed to be a first for a history-based RTS game. The team discovered that those who favored the single-player mode in Empire Earth preferred slower, more management-based gameplay. However, multiplayer users were split, with half in favor of shorter matches filled with combat. To please both audiences, the Empire Builder and Action modes were included to offer "a rush-oriented game for the pro gamers and a more defensive game for the casual gamer", in Goodman's words.

=== Production ===
In December 2002, publisher Activision signed Stainless Steel to a multi-game contract, the first title of which was revealed to be Empires in February 2003. By April, the team estimated the game to be 60–70% finished. The engine used to create Empire Earth—later released under the name Titan 2.0—was retained and upgraded for Empires. Significantly more detail was added to the units' 3D models than had appeared in Empire Earth. Further additions included reflection mapping, environmental bump mapping and a new physics engine. According to Goodman, reusing the game engine enabled the team to place its full concentration on gameplay, without worrying about technological development. Another priority was storytelling, an element of the RTS game Warcraft III: Reign of Chaos (2002) particularly enjoyed by the Empires team.

Empires was designed primarily for multiplayer gameplay: the multiplayer development team created and fine-tuned each civilization, which the single-player team then used in campaign levels. Because the civilizations do not overlap, Bishop considered game balance to be the most difficult aspect of the project. Previously, Stainless Steel had balanced its games in a microcosmic fashion: the "individual components" of each civilization—for example, the economic power of Germany versus that of England—were balanced against one another. Balance on this scale led to overarching balance. However, this technique hinged on a broad similarity between civilizations that is not present in Empires. Consequently, the company had to abandon its earlier practice and "develop an entirely new methodology", Goodman explained. The result was a macrocosmic system of balance, in which civilizations are inherently unbalanced but equally powerful overall.

As with Empire Earth, each new build of Empires was given to "strike teams" of playtesters. By April, between six and eight months of playtesting had been performed by a group of six professional RTS players. GameSpy's Allen Rausch wrote that the process allows a game to be "consistently tested, evaluated, balanced, and tweaked" at every stage of development, which enables complex forms of balance. This let the Empires team create a looser version of the rock paper scissors system typical of RTS games, wherein one type of unit is either very strong or very weak against other types. In Empires, each unit's strengths and weaknesses were made subtle enough to curb "hopeless mismatches" and reward skillful micromanagement, according to Bishop. The duration of the average battle was increased to provide more opportunities to micromanage units. Empires went gold on October 7, 2003, and it was released on the 22nd of that month.

== Reception ==
Reception

Aggregate scores
Aggregator	Score
GameRankings	81%
Metacritic	81/100

Review scores
Publication	Score
Computer Gaming World	4/5
Game Informer	8.25/10
GameSpot	8.5
GameSpy	85%
IGN	8.8/10
PC Gamer (US)	80%
PC Zone	8.3
X-Play	4/5

Empires was received positively by critics, according to review aggregators Metacritic and GameRankings. The game's sales, when combined with those of Empire Earth, surpassed 2.5 million units by May 2004. Game Informer's Adam Biessener called Empires "a good knockoff" of WarCraft III and Age of Mythology, worthwhile for fans of the RTS genre. He praised its Empire Builder and Action modes, and the uniqueness of its multiplayer mode; but he found its single-player campaigns to be lackluster. Jonah Jackson of X-Play, Ron Dulin of Computer Gaming World and Stephen Poole of PC Gamer US were similarly unimpressed by the game's single-player mode: the last critic highlighted its "stupendously loquacious cut-scenes and terrible voice-acting". However, Poole dubbed Empires a strong, streamlined and fully featured multiplayer game, which he recommended despite its flaws and lack of innovation. Jackson lauded the multiplayer component as well, and he believed that, while the game at first seems unoriginal, Empires is "the most mature and well-balanced of Goodman's titles".

Regarding the single-player campaigns, PC Zone's writers noted strong level design and "voice acting of the highest calibre"; and they praised the multiplayer mode's "balance and diversity". However, they criticized the pathfinding, interface, unoriginality and inconsistent graphical quality of Empires, and they named it the inferior of Medieval: Total War and Rise of Nations. Conversely, Dulin agreed with Jackson that Empires is a deceptively conventional RTS, which introduces "great, if initially unapparent, changes to the standard formula." He summarized it as a well-made competitor to historical RTS titles like Rise of Nations, Age of Empires and Empire Earth. Writing for GameSpot, Sam Parker argued that Empires separated itself from rivals Age of Empires II: The Age of Kings and Age of Mythology, and he commented, "While it may not have the breadth of Rise of Nations' real-time empire building, the tight scope deals out dividends when it comes to fast-paced battles."

Steve Butts of IGN, along with GameSpy's Rausch, called Empires a major improvement on the foundation of Empire Earth, thanks to its smaller scope and deeper gameplay. Like the staff of PC Zone, both writers enjoyed the single-player mode, although Rausch noted its middling writing and voice acting. Rausch considered the multiplayer mode to be Empires' best feature: he felt that its Empire Builder and Action modes were both balanced, and that each civilization "offers players a completely different experience". He noted the game's audiovisual presentation as a low point. Butts found fault with the game's camera system, but he summarized Empires as a unique RTS and "a good direction for the genre".

During the 7th Annual Interactive Achievement Awards, the Academy of Interactive Arts & Sciences nominated Empires for "Computer Strategy Game of the Year".
