= Stainless Steel Studios =

Video game developer in Massachusetts, US

- Type: Private
- Industry: Video games
- Founded: October 1997
- Founders: Rick Goodman; Dara-Lynn Pelechatz
- Defunct: November 25, 2005
- Headquarters: Cambridge, Massachusetts
- Products: Empire Earth; Empires: Dawn of the Modern World; Titan game engine Rise & Fall: Civilizations at War
- Website: stainlesssteelstudios.com

Stainless Steel Studios (SSSI) was a video game developer, started in 1997 by Rick Goodman and Dara-Lynn Pelechatz. The company was based in Cambridge, Massachusetts, and focused on the development of real-time strategy games.

== History ==
Stainless Steel was started in October 1997 by Rick Goodman and Dara-Lynn Pelechatz, the latter of who served as director of operations. The name "Stainless Steel" was thought up by Goodman on a returning flight from California. Pelechatz said in an interview with GameSpy:

While returning on a flight from California, Rick saw the Sky Mall catalog. Well he decided he was going to open the book and put his finger on the first item he saw, hence that would be the name of his new company. The item Rick located was a stainless steel shower head.

The logo was designed by Stainless Steel with Jam Design, it is a silver ball with a salamander on top of it.

On November 25, 2005, Gamasutra reported that Stainless Steel Studios quietly ceased operations and laid off its employees. The content of the official website was removed in November. Former SSSI employees Bob Scott and Daniel Higgins confirmed rumors appearing on the HeavenGames Rise & Fall fan site forum.

Higgins wrote in reply to questions about the credibility of the rumors:

This is true, SSSI is no more. I can't give details as to why, but I can tell you the product is in excellent shape, the team was in high morale and plowing ahead at full steam, and we were just weeks from gold disk.

The game was later completed by Midway Games and release on 12 June 2006. Shortly after, it was learned that Stainless Steel was closed because of cuts in funding from publisher Midway Games, its most important client. Since Stainless Steel's closure, Sierra closed Empire Earth's server, so it is impossible to play online or update the game.

== Games ==
Year released	Game title	Publisher
2001	Empire Earth	Sierra Entertainment
2003	Empires: Dawn of the Modern World	Activision
2006	Rise and Fall: Civilizations at War	Midway Games

== See also ==
- Ensemble Studios
- Microsoft Game Studios
- Sierra Entertainment
