= Borg =

Fictional faction in Star Trek

The Borg
- Star Trek race
- Created by: Maurice Hurley

In-universe information
- Base of operations: Delta Quadrant
- Leader: Borg Queen

The Borg are an alien group that appear as recurring antagonists in the Star Trek fictional universe. They are cyborgs linked in a hive mind called "The Collective". The Borg co-opted the technology and knowledge of other alien species to the Collective through the process of "assimilation": forcibly transforming individual beings into "drones" by injecting nanoprobes into their bodies and surgically augmenting them with cybernetic components. The Borg's ultimate goal is "achieving perfection".

Aside from being recurring antagonists in the Next Generation television series, they are depicted as the main threat in the film Star Trek: First Contact. In addition, they played major roles in the Voyager and Picard series.

The Borg have become a symbol in popular culture for any juggernaut against which "resistance is futile" – a common phrase uttered by the Borg.

== Concept ==
The Borg represented a new antagonist and regular enemy which had been lacking during the first season of Star Trek: The Next Generation (TNG); the Klingons were allies and the Romulans mostly absent. The Ferengi were originally intended as the new enemy for the United Federation of Planets, but their comical appearance failed to portray them as a convincing threat. The Borg, however, with their frightening appearance, their immense power, and their sinister motive, became the signature villains for the TNG and Voyager eras of Star Trek. In Voyager episode "Q2", even the near-omnipotent Q tells his son, "Don't provoke the Borg!"

TNG writers began to develop the idea of the Borg as early as the Season 1 episode "Conspiracy", which introduced a coercive, symbiotic life form that took over key Federation personnel. Plans to feature the Borg as an increasingly menacing threat were subsequently scrapped in favor of a more subtle introduction, beginning with the mystery of missing Federation and Romulan colonies on both sides of the Neutral Zone in "The Neutral Zone" and culminating in the encounter between Borg and the Enterprise crew in "Q Who".

== Depiction ==
The Borg are cyborgs, having outward appearances showing both mechanical and biological body parts. Individual Borg are referred to as drones and move in a robotic, purposeful style, ignoring most of their environment, including beings they do not consider an immediate threat. Borg commonly have one eye replaced with a sophisticated ocular implant. Borg usually have one arm replaced with a prosthesis, bearing one of a variety of multipurpose tools in place of a humanoid hand. Since different drones have different roles, the arm may be specialized for myriad purposes such as medical devices, scanners, and weapons. Borg have flat, grayish skin, giving them an almost zombie-like appearance.

Borg are highly resistant to energy-based weapons, having personal shielding that quickly adapts. In various episodes, phasers and other directed energy weapons tend to quickly become ineffective as the Borg are able to adapt to the specific frequencies on which these weapons are projected once a ship or an individual drone is struck down. Later attempts to modulate phaser and other weapon frequencies had limited success. Borg shields are ineffective protection against projectile or melee weapons, and several have been defeated in this way, or through hand-to-hand combat.

Borg drones possess a "cortical node" that controls other implanted cybernetic devices within a Borg drone's body; it is most often implanted in the forehead above the organic eye. If the cortical node fails, the drone eventually dies. Successful replacement of the node can be carried out on a Borg vessel.

=== Borg Collective ===
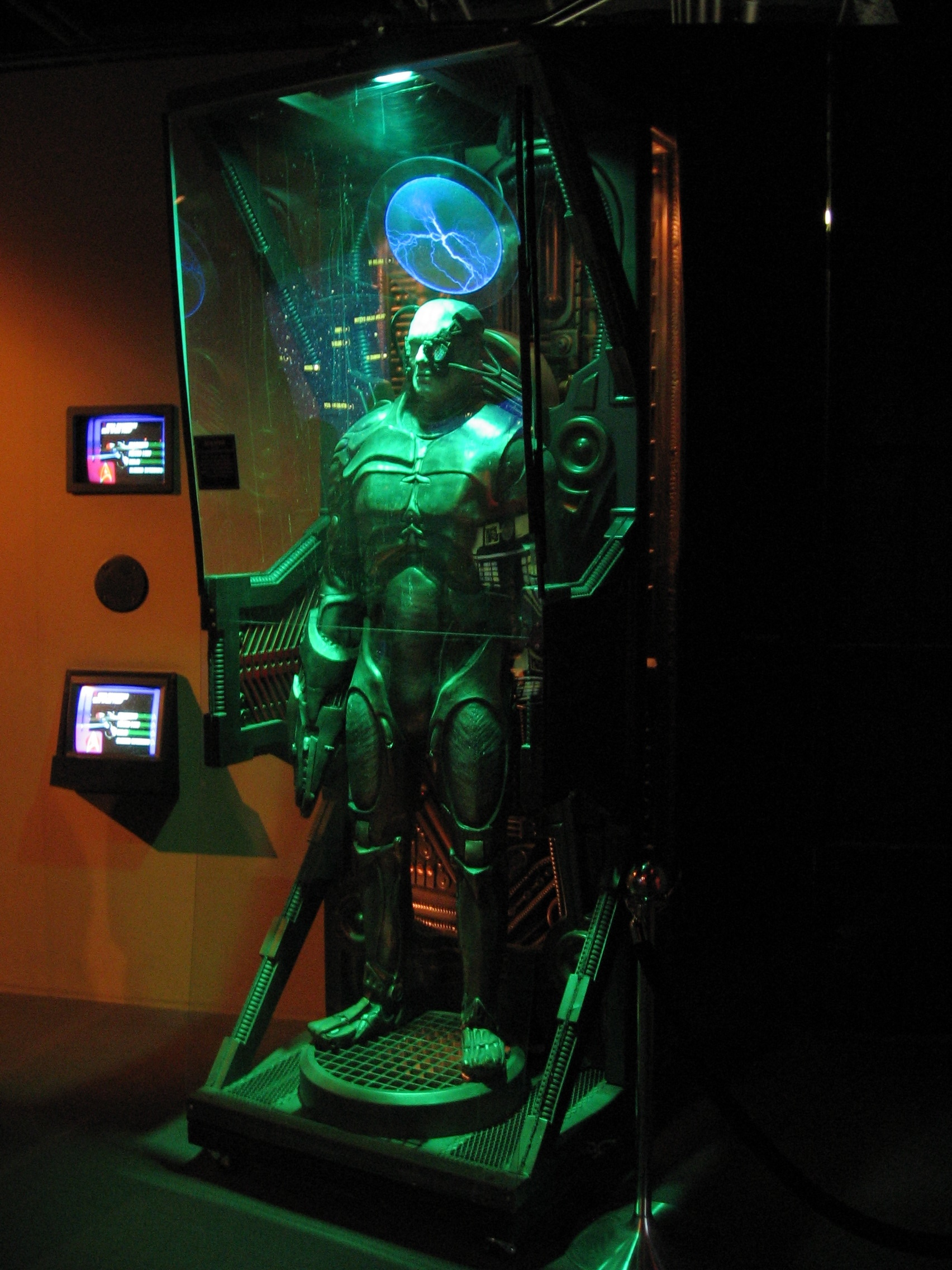
An occupied Borg "alcove" prop on display at the Hollywood Entertainment Museum

Borg civilization is based on a hive or group mind known as the Collective. Each Borg drone is linked to the collective by a sophisticated subspace network that ensures each member is given constant supervision and guidance. The mental energy of the group consciousness can help an injured or damaged drone heal or regenerate damaged body parts or technology. The collective consciousness gives them the ability not only to "share the same thoughts", but also to adapt quickly to new tactics. Individual drones in the Collective are rarely seen speaking, but a collective "voice" is sometimes transmitted to ships.

=== "Resistance is futile" ===
Individual Borg rarely speak, although they do send a collective audio message to their targets, stating that "resistance is futile", often followed by a declaration that the target in question will be assimilated and its "biological and technological distinctiveness" will be added to their own. The exact phrasing varies and evolves over the various series episodes and film.

In Star Trek: First Contact, the voice of the Borg is spoken by Jeff Coopwood. The Borg's warning is:

We are the Borg. Lower your shields and surrender your ships. We will add your biological and technological distinctiveness to our own. Your culture will adapt to service us. Resistance is futile.

=== Nanoprobes ===
Nanoprobes are microscopic machines that inhabit a Borg's body, bloodstream, and many cybernetic implants. The probes maintain the Borg cybernetic systems and repair damage to the organic parts of a Borg. They generate new technology inside a Borg when needed and protect them from many forms of disease. Borg nanoprobes, each about the size of a human red blood cell, travel through the victim's bloodstream and attach to individual cells. The nanoprobes rewrite the cellular DNA, altering the victim's biochemistry, and eventually form larger, more complicated structures and networks within the body, like electrical pathways, processing and data-storage nodes, and ultimately prosthetic devices that spring forth from the skin. In "Mortal Coil", Seven of Nine says the Borg assimilated the nanoprobe technology from "Species 149". In addition, the nanoprobes maintain and repair their host's mechanical and biological components on a microscopic level, imparting regenerative capabilities.

Though used by the Borg to exert control over another being, reprogrammed nanoprobes were used by the crew of the starship Voyager in many instances as medical aids.

The capability of nanoprobes to absorb improved technologies they find into the Borg collective is shown in the Voyager episode "Drone", where Seven of Nine's nanoprobes are fused with the Doctor's mobile emitter, which uses technology from the 29th century, creating a 29th-century drone existing outside the Collective, with capabilities far surpassing those of the 24th-century drones.

The Borg do not try to immediately assimilate any being with which they come into contact; Borg drones tend to completely ignore individuals that are identified as too weak to be an imminent threat or too inferior to be worth assimilating. Captain Picard and his team walk safely past a group of Borg drones in a scene from the film Star Trek: First Contact while the drones fulfill a programmed mission. In the Star Trek: Voyager episode "Mortal Coil", Seven of Nine told Neelix the Kazon were "unworthy" of assimilation and would serve only to detract from the Borg's quest for perceived perfection.

=== Travel ===
The Borg are a spacefaring race, and their primary interstellar-transport and combat-vessel is known as a "Borg Cube" due to its shape. A Cube was first seen during the Borg's introduction in the Next Generation episode "Q Who", which established the vessel as vastly exceeding the capability of Enterprise – the main ship of the series and Federation flagship – to defend against or escape it without outside intervention. The episode "The Best of Both Worlds" and the film Star Trek: First Contact both depict single Cubes as critical, military threats; capable of fighting or defeating an entire fleet of ships.

Common capabilities of Cubes include high-speed warp and transwarp drives, self-regeneration, multiple-redundant systems, adaptability in combat, and various energy weapons; as well as tractor beams and cutting beams. As with most other Star Trek races, the Borg have transporter capability. Cubes are also distinguished by their immense size and lack of streamlining.

Different types and sizes of Cubes have appeared, as well as Borg Spheres and some smaller craft.

=== Assimilation ===
Assimilation is the process by which the Borg integrate beings, cultures, and technology into the Collective. "You will be assimilated" is one of the few on-screen phrases employed by the Borg when communicating with other species. The Borg are portrayed as having found and assimilated thousands of species and billions to trillions of individual life-forms throughout the galaxy. The Borg designate each species with a number assigned to them upon first contact, humanity being "Species 5618".

When first introduced, the Borg are said to be more interested in assimilating technology than people, roaming the universe as single-minded marauders assimilating starships, planets, and entire societies to collect new technology. They are discriminating in this area, finding certain races, for example the Kazon, to be technologically inferior and unworthy of assimilation. The Borg then place the assimilated children into maturation chambers to quickly and fully grow them into mature drones.

Patrick Stewart as Locutus of Borg, the assimilated Jean-Luc Picard

In their second appearance, "The Best of Both Worlds", they capture and assimilate Captain Jean-Luc Picard into the Collective, creating Locutus of Borg (meaning "he who has spoken", in Latin).

The method of assimilating individual life-forms into the Collective has been represented differently over time. The Borg in Star Trek: The Next Generation assimilate through abduction and then surgical procedure. In Star Trek: First Contact and Star Trek: Voyager, assimilation is through injection of nanoprobes into an individual's bloodstream via a pair of tubules that spring forth from a drone's hand. Assimilation by tubules is depicted on-screen as being a fast-acting process, with the victim's skin pigmentation turning gray and mottled with visible dark tracks forming within moments of contact. After assimilation, a drone's race and gender become "irrelevant". After initial assimilation through injection, Borg are surgically fitted with cybernetic devices. In Star Trek: First Contact an assimilated crew member is shown to have a forearm and an eye physically removed and replaced with cybernetic implants.

The Borg also assimilate, interface, and reconfigure technology using these tubules and nanoprobes. However, in "Q Who" a Borg is depicted apparently trying to assimilate, probe, or reconfigure a control panel in engineering using an energy interface instead of nanoprobes.

Some species, for various reasons, are able to resist assimilation by nanoprobes. Species 8472 is the only race shown to be capable of completely rejecting assimilation attempts. Other species, such as the Hirogen, have demonstrated resistance to assimilation as well as Dr Phlox, who was able to partially resist the assimilation process in the Star Trek: Enterprise episode "Regeneration".

=== Borg Queen ===
Alice Krige as the Borg Queen in Star Trek: First Contact

Before the film Star Trek: First Contact (1996), the Borg exhibited no hierarchical command structure. First Contact introduced the Borg Queen, who is not named as such in the film (referring to herself with "I am the Borg. I am the Collective... I am the beginning, the end, the one who is many") but is named Borg Queen in the closing credits. The Queen is played by Alice Krige in this film; in the 2001 finale of Star Trek: Voyager "Endgame"; the Star Trek: Lower Decks second season episode "I, Excretus"; and the last two episodes in the final season of Star Trek: Picard. The character also appeared in Voyager's two-part episodes "Dark Frontier" (1999) and "Unimatrix Zero" (2000), but was portrayed by Susanna Thompson. Whether or not these appearances represent the same queen is never specified. The queen appeared to be killed in both First Contact and "Endgame", so there may be a total of three queens throughout the series. In First Contact, the Borg Queen is seen during a flashback of Picard's former assimilation, establishing she was present during the events of "Best of Both Worlds".

The Borg Queen is the focal point within the Borg collective consciousness and a unique drone within the Collective, who brings "order to chaos", referring to herself as "we" and "I" interchangeably. In First Contact, the Queen's dialogue suggests she is an expression of the Borg Collective's overall intelligence, not a controller but the avatar of the entire Collective as an individual. This sentiment is contradicted by Star Trek: Voyager, where she is seen explicitly directing, commanding, and in one instance even overriding the Collective. The introduction of the Queen radically changed the canonical understanding of the Borg function, with the authors of The Computers of Star Trek noting: "It was a lot easier for viewers to focus on a villain rather than a hive-mind that made decisions based on the input of all its members." First Contact writers Brannon Braga and Ronald D. Moore have defended the introduction of the Queen as a dramatic necessity, noting on the film's DVD audio commentary that they had initially written the film with drones, but then found that it was essential for the main characters to have someone to interact with beyond mindless drones.

The Borg Queen returned in the second season of Star Trek: Picard, played by Annie Wersching and Alison Pill. This Borg Queen was from an alternate timeline created by Q's manipulations and she merged with Doctor Agnes Jurati. After being convinced to create a Collective based on free will, she departs in Agnes' body in 2024. In 2401, the same Queen reappears at the head of a Borg faction seeking to join Starfleet and defend the galaxy from an unknown threat that is coming. After recognizing the Queen as Agnes, Picard allows her to proceed.

In the third season of Star Trek: Picard, the Borg Queen, this one representing the main faction of the Borg, returns in the penultimate episode where she assimilates Jack Crusher and is revealed to have been behind the Changelings' actions throughout the season, using them as part of a plan to infiltrate and take over the Federation. In the series finale, the Queen reveals that the Borg were decimated following the events of Star Trek: Voyager and she now seeks to evolve and propagate her race while annihilating all other life forms in the galaxy, having cannibalized many of her remaining drones to survive. After Picard rescues Jack, the Borg Queen is killed when her Cube is destroyed by the Enterprise-D, freeing Starfleet from her assimilation.

== Borg appearances ==
The Borg were introduced on syndicated television on May 8, 1989, in the Star Trek: The Next Generation episode "Q Who", and rose to further prominence in the two-part cliffhanger "Best of Both Worlds, Part I", which aired on June 18, 1990, with the sequel airing on September 24, 1990. In the Star Trek in-universe timeline, the earliest the Borg have been displayed is in 1996's Star Trek: First Contact.

Overall, Borg aliens appear in a total of about a hundred episodes of various incarnations of Star Trek. This number includes all episodes featuring Seven of Nine, a former Borg drone; discounting these appearances, the Borg appear in six episodes of Star Trek: The Next Generation (and one feature film), one episode of Star Trek: Deep Space Nine, 23 episodes of Star Trek: Voyager, and one episode of Star Trek: Enterprise.

=== The Next Generation ===
The Borg first appear in the Star Trek: The Next Generation second-season episode "Q Who", when the omnipotent life-form Q hurls the Enterprise-D across the galaxy to challenge Jean-Luc Picard's assertion that his crew is ready to face the galaxy's dangers and mysteries. The Enterprise crew is overwhelmed by the Borg, and Picard begs for – and receives – Q's help in returning the ship to its previous coordinates.

The Borg next appear in The Next Generation's third-season finale and fourth-season premiere, "The Best of Both Worlds". Picard is abducted and assimilated by the Borg and transformed into Locutus (Latin for "he who speaks"). Picard's knowledge of Starfleet's strengths and strategies is gained by the Collective, and the single cube destroys the entire Starfleet armada at Wolf 359. The Enterprise crew manages to capture Locutus, gain information through him that allows them to destroy the cube, and then reverse the assimilation process.

In the fifth-season episode "I, Borg", the Enterprise crew rescues an adolescent Borg they name "Hugh". The crew faces the moral decision of whether or not to use Hugh (who begins to develop a sense of independence as a result of a severed link to the Collective) as a means of delivering a devastating computer virus to the Borg, or return him to the Borg with his individuality intact. They decide to return him without the virus, but in the sixth-season episode "Descent", a group of rogue Borg who had "assimilated" individuality through Hugh fall under the control of the android Lore, the "older brother" of Data. Lore also corrupts Data through the use of an "emotion chip", simultaneously deactivating Data's ethical subroutines and projecting only negative emotions to it. Under this programming, Data participates in the capture of Picard, La Forge, and Troi; but they are able to reactivate Data's ethical subroutines, allowing him to recognize that his current actions are wrong and leading him to deactivate Lore. Data recovers the emotion chip and the surviving Borg fall under the leadership of Hugh.

In 2017, Syfy listed "I, Borg" among the 25 best science-fiction episodes of the last 25 years.

=== First Contact ===
The Borg return as the antagonists in the Next Generation film Star Trek: First Contact. After again failing to assimilate Earth by a direct assault in the year 2373, the Borg travel back in time to the year 2063 to try to stop Zefram Cochrane's first contact with the Vulcans, change the timeline, and erase Starfleet from existence. The Enterprise-E crew follows the Borg back in time and restores the original timeline. First Contact introduces the Borg Queen as played by Alice Krige, who later reprised the role for the finale of Star Trek: Voyager.

=== Deep Space Nine ===
There is only one appearance of the Borg in Star Trek: Deep Space Nine, in the series premiere "Emissary". The episode's prologue depicts Benjamin Sisko (Avery Brooks) as First Officer on the USS Saratoga, in the Starfleet armada dispatched to confront the Borg at Wolf 359. The Saratoga is destroyed by the Borg, killing Sisko's wife, Jennifer. Later in the episode, Sisko's meeting with Picard is tense, as he blames Picard for the actions of Locutus. Throughout the remainder of the series, references to the Borg are occasionally made, including the intent behind the design of the ship assigned to Deep Space Nine -- the USS Defiant -- and the Battle of Sector 001, in which the Defiant took part under the command of Worf (Michael Dorn), from Star Trek: First Contact being used as a plot point in the fifth season, when Starfleet is spread too thin to deal with an incursion by the Dominion.

=== Voyager ===
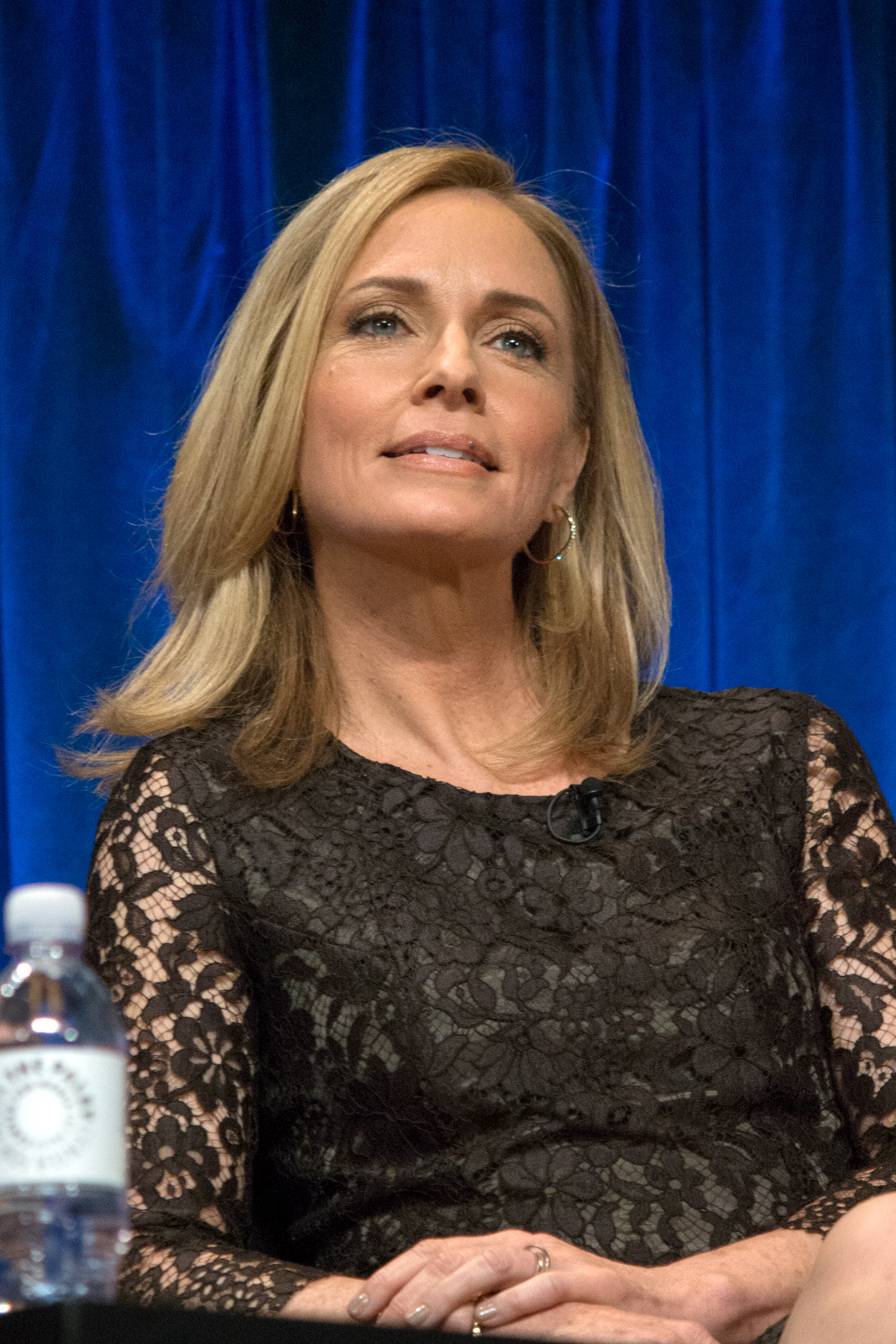
Actress Susanna Thompson was cast as the Borg Queen in "Dark Frontier" and "Unimatrix, Part I" and Part II.

The Borg make frequent appearances in Star Trek: Voyager, which takes place in the Delta Quadrant. The Borg are first seen by Voyager in the third-season episode "Blood Fever" in which Chakotay discovers the body of what the local humanoids refer to as "the Invaders", which turns out to be the Borg. In "Scorpion", the Borg are engaged in a war of attrition against Species 8472, whose biological defenses are a match for the Borg's nanoprobes. In one of the few instances of the Borg negotiating, in exchange for safe passage through Borg space, the Voyager crew devises a way to destroy the otherwise invulnerable Species 8472. A Borg drone, Seven of Nine, is dispatched to Voyager to facilitate this arrangement. After successfully driving Species 8472 back into their fluidic space, Seven of Nine is severed from the Collective and becomes a member of Voyager's crew. Seven of Nine's rediscovery of both her individuality and her humanity becomes a recurring theme throughout the rest of the series.

The Hollywood Reporter ranked "Scorpion" as the 4th-best episode of Voyager in 2016, and the 37th best Star Trek episode. In 2017, Den of Geek rated "Scorpion" among the top 50 Star Trek episodes overall.

In the fifth season, the Borg appears in "Drone", where an advanced drone is created when Seven of Nine's nanoprobes are fused with the Doctor's mobile emitter in a transporter accident. The Borg play a peripheral role in "Infinite Regress", when Seven of Nine is exposed to a weapon against the Borg that essentially causes her to suffer from multiple-personality disorder, being taken over by the personalities of other assimilated beings, such as a human child, a Klingon, and a Vulcan. In "Dark Frontier", Voyager steals and uses a transwarp coil to both rescue Seven of Nine from the Borg Queen and then cut another fifteen years off of their journey home before the coil burns out.

Juliette Harrisson, writing for Den of Geek in 2017, gave actress Susanna Thompson and Alice Krige as Borg Queens an honorable mention in a ranking of best guest-stars on Star Trek: Voyager.

In the sixth-season episode "Collective", the crew of Voyager encounter a damaged cube that is holding Tom Paris, Neelix, Harry Kim, and Chakotay hostage. With all the adult drones dead, the ship is run by five Borg children who are saved by Voyager and deassimilated. The later episode "Child's Play" reveals that the cube was infected by a pathogen that Icheb - one of the children - had been engineered to act as a host for by his parents, but the crew rescue Icheb before he can be sent back to the Borg. The crew encounter the Borg again in "Unimatrix Zero", a two-part cliffhanger between seasons six and seven.

In "Q2", Q's son brings several Borg cubes and drones into conflict with Voyager for his own amusement; before Q rescues them and warns his son not to provoke the Borg. In "Shattered", a freak accident allows Chakotay to travel to various time-periods in the ship's history; including the events depicted in "Scorpion", where he interacts with the fully assimilated drone Seven. In the series finale, "Endgame", a future Admiral Janeway tries to bring Voyager back to Earth using a Borg transwarp hub. During this episode, she infects the Borg with a neurolytic pathogen which infects the Collective and kills the Queen.

There are 26 major episodes featuring the Borg in Voyager; however, there are about 100 if counting those with Seven of Nine.

=== Enterprise ===
In the Star Trek: Enterprise episode "Regeneration", the remnants of the destroyed sphere from Star Trek: First Contact are discovered in the Arctic along with two frozen drones. The Borg steal a research ship and send a transmission toward the Delta Quadrant before they are destroyed, creating a perpetual time loop/predestination paradox.

=== Picard ===
The first season of Star Trek: Picard included four recovering ex-Borg characters: Picard, Seven of Nine, Hugh (featured in "I, Borg" and "Descent"), and Icheb. The Borg are described as "hobbled" and "decimated", with many Borg drones being de-assimilated and Borg cubes and vessels dismantled for their valuable technology. However, they remain a potent threat, with Seven even briefly assuming the role of a Borg Queen to reactivate several inactive drones and use them against the Tal Shiar.

In the second season, a damaged Borg Queen is recruited by Picard to help him and his crew travel into the past and prevent the creation of the xenophobic and totalitarian "Confederation of Earth". The Queen, taking an interest in Picard's friend Agnes Jurati, assimilates her and takes control of her body while plotting to steal an advanced space shuttle so she can assimilate the galaxy before the birth of the Federation. However, Agnes persuades the Queen that the Borg will always be defeated because their collective is built on fear and domination rather than trust. Intrigued by the possibility of finally attaining perfection, the Queen departs Earth to test Agnes' theory.

Upon returning to the 25th century, towards the end of the Season 2 finale, it is revealed that a volatile trans-warp conduit threatens to destroy part of the galaxy. Picard orders the fleet to comply with the Borg Queen’s wishes to take control of all vessels in order to create a force field. After the successful containment of the emissions from the conduit, it remains open but nobody knows where it leads. Fearing it may attract belligerents, the Borg Queen volunteers the Borg to protect the conduit, expressing her wish to align the Borg with Starfleet and join the Federation with Agnes as the human counterpart of the Borg Queen.

In the third season, it is revealed that the original Borg had allied with Changelings to infiltrate Starfleet and assimilate it by stealth. They did so by stealing the original body of Picard from Daystrom Station and extracting a part of his brain matter that had been altered during his transformation into Locutus. What had been mistaken for a defect in Picard's brain had actually been the Borg alterations which turned Picard into a receiver for the Collective, allowing him to hear them even without implants and eventually causing his physical death. The Changelings then infiltrated Starfleet and sabotaged its transporter systems, overwriting parts of the transporter code with code created from the genetic material, with the effect that it would implant Borg genes into everybody who used transporters. However, only those who did not have a fully-developed frontal cortex (those under age 25) would be affected when the Borg send a signal that activates the assimilation process.

The Borg hijack Frontier Day and order the death of everyone who has not been assimilated. The Borg also show an interest in Jack Crusher, the son of Picard and Beverly Crusher, as he also carries Borg DNA inherited from his father, although his more developed genes make him a transmitter instead, resulting in Jack hearing the Collective in his head throughout his life. He is also assimilated, becoming Vox.

With Starfleet compromised by the Borg, the crew of The Next Generation press the rebuilt Enterprise-D—the only functional ship immune to the Borg takeover—back into service. Locating the Queen's ship above Jupiter, Picard confronts her; and the Borg Queen explains that following the events of "Endgame," the Borg were decimated to the point of near-destruction by the future Janeway's pathogen - leaving only the Borg Queen, a handful of drones, and a single Borg Cube by the time that Picard meets the Queen again. Driven insane by loneliness and forced to resort to cannibalism of her own drones to survive, the Borg Queen no longer seeks assimilation; but rather evolution, propagation, and the annihilation of all other lifeforms in the galaxy. However, Picard is able to break Jack out of the Borg Queen's control while Enterprise destroys the Borg Cube and with it, the Borg Queen and all of the remaining Borg drones. Destroying the Borg Cube breaks the Borg's control over Starfleet, and Beverly Crusher is able to come up with a solution to remove the Borg DNA from those afflicted with it.

=== Prodigy ===
In the Star Trek: Prodigy episode "Let Sleeping Borg Lie", the crew of the starship Protostar encounter a dormant Borg cube. Believing the collective may hold the knowledge needed to shut down a dangerous weapon on their ship, the crew board the cube in search of its data hub. Crewmember Zero connects to the collective and is nearly assimilated as the Borg awaken and attack the others. Zero disables the Borg and the crew escape, though without the information they seek.

== Origin ==
The origin of the Borg is never made clear, though they are portrayed as having existed for hundreds of thousands of years (as attested by Guinan and the Borg Queen). In Star Trek: First Contact, the Borg Queen merely states that the Borg were once much like humanity, "flawed and weak", but gradually developed into a partially synthetic species in an ongoing attempt to evolve and perfect themselves.

In TNG's "Q Who", Guinan mentions that the Borg are "made up of organic and artificial life [...] which has been developing for [...] thousands of centuries." In the later episode of Star Trek: Voyager, "Dragon's Teeth", Gedrin, of the race the Vaadwaur, says that before he and his people were put into suspended animation 892 years earlier (1482 A.D.), the Borg had assimilated only a few colonies in the Delta Quadrant and were considered essentially a minor nuisance. Now awake in the 24th century, he is amazed to see that the Borg control a vast area of the Delta Quadrant. Seven of Nine comments that the Borg's collective memories of that time period are fragmentary, though it is never established why that is.

=== Non-canon origin stories ===
The Star Trek Encyclopedia speculates that a connection could exist between the Borg and V'ger, the vessel encountered in Star Trek: The Motion Picture. This idea of a connection is advanced in William Shatner's novel The Return. The connection was also suggested in a letter included in Starlog no. 160 (November 1990). The letter writer, Christopher Haviland, also speculated that the original Borg drones were members of a race called "the Preservers", which Spock had suggested in the original series episode "The Paradise Syndrome" might be the reason why so many humanoids populate the galaxy. It was confirmed in the TNG episode "The Chase" that an ancient species seeded hundreds, if not thousands of planets with their DNA, creating the Humans, Vulcans (and Romulans as they are a Vulcan offshoot race), Cardassians and others.

==== Star Trek: Legacy game version ====
The extra section of the game Star Trek: Legacy contains the supposed "Origin of the Borg", based on a scene in Star Trek: The Motion Picture which tells the story of V'ger being sucked into a black hole. V'ger was found by a race of living machines that gave it a form suitable to fulfilling its simplistic programming. Unable to determine who its creator could be, the probe declared all carbon-based life an infestation of the creator's universe. In order to prevent the destruction of Earth by the V'ger probe, Commander Decker volunteered to merge with it so that it could fulfill its purpose, albeit a purpose which space and time had corrupted to the point that only fusing with its creator could satisfy it. From this, the Borg were created, as extensions of V'ger's purpose. Drones were made from those assimilated and merged into a collective consciousness. The Borg Queen was created out of the necessity for a single unifying voice. With thoughts and desires of her own, she was no longer bound to serve V'ger.

==== Star Trek: The Manga version ====
In the graphic novel Star Trek: The Manga, the Borg resulted from an experiment in medical nanotechnology gone wrong. An alien species under threat of extinction by an incurable disease created a repository satellite containing test subjects infused with body parts, organs, and DNA of multiple species along with cybernetic enhancements put in place by advanced medical technology. The satellite was maintained by nanomachines, which also maintained the medical equipment on board. The medical facility is parked in orbit by a black hole, and along with the relativistic state of time around the black hole, allows long-term research to continue at an accelerated time scale rather than in real-time speed. As the medical facility deteriorates, so does the programming of the nanomachines. The nanomachines began infusing themselves into the patients, interpreting them as part of the satellite in need of repair. Among the patients is the daughter of the head medical researcher of the satellite. The satellite eventually falls apart in an encounter with an away team from the Enterprise under the command of James T. Kirk. In the final moments of the satellite's destruction and the escape of the crew members of the Enterprise with the patients, the subjects display qualities inherently resembling the Borg: injection of nanomachines in a fashion similar to assimilation, rapid adaptation to weaponry, and a hive mind consciousness, as all the subjects begin following the whim of the daughter. As succumbing to the disease was inevitable, and the corrupt nanomachine programming infused itself into the bodies, the final image of the page of the manga Borg origin is left with the daughter turned Borg Queen saying, "Resistance is futile."

==== Lost Souls version ====
In the novel Lost Souls (the third book in the Star Trek: Destiny trilogy), the Borg are revealed to be the survivors of the Caeliar city Mantilis. Thrown across the galaxy in the Delta Quadrant and back in time to about 4500 BC by the destruction of Erigol at the climax of Gods of Night, the first book in the trilogy, a group of human survivors from the starship Columbia (NX-02) and Caeliar scientists try to survive in a harsh arctic climate. Most of the human survivors die of exposure, while several Caeliar are absorbed into their race's gestalt to give life to the others in their group mind. The Caeliar offer the remaining humans a merging of human and Caeliar, to allow both groups to survive.

The human survivors are resistant and as time goes on, the Caeliar called Sedin becomes the sole survivor of her group, her mental processes and her form both degrading as time goes on. When the humans return to Sedin for help, she forces them to merge with her, unwilling to allow herself to die when a union can save her life. The forced merging of the humans and the mostly decayed Caeliar results in the creation of the first Borg. The gestalt group mind is perverted to become the collective, driven by Sedin's desperate hunger and need to add the strength, technology, and life-force of others to her own.

Ironically, while the Caeliar were – albeit accidentally – involved in the creation of the Borg, they also provide the means to end it; in the 24th century, the Caeliar absorb the entire Borg collective back into themselves, ending the cyborgs' centuries-long reign of terror. However, in the Star Trek: Coda trilogy that ends with the erasure of the novel timeline, Picard confronts the Borg Queen of an alternate timeline where they conquered Earth in First Contact, and when he attempts to use his knowledge of the Borg's creation to catch the Queen off-guard she expresses ignorance of that timeline. Picard speculates that the Borg have such a complex history that time-travel has basically manipulated their reality to such an extent that even they don't have a definitive origin any more.

== Other non-canon media appearances ==
In the Star Trek novel Probe, which takes place following the events of Star Trek IV: The Voyage Home, the Borg are mentioned obliquely in communication with the whale-probe as spacefaring "mites" (the whale-probe's term for humanoid races) who traveled in cubical and spherical spacefaring vessels; the Borg apparently attacked the whale-probe and damaged its memory in some fashion before the events of the film.

In the Star Trek game Star Trek: Legacy, the Borg are featured prominently throughout the Enterprise and TOS eras before becoming a major threat in the TNG era. In unlockable motion-comics that are unlocked after completing each era, it is revealed that the Vulcan T'Uerell experimented on Borg corpses left behind from the Enterprise episode "Regeneration", and became assimilated. It was not until the end of the TOS era that she made contact with the main Borg force and became a queen before she was finally killed in a fleet of Starfleet, Romulan, and Klingon ships led by Picard.

The Peter David novel Vendetta reveals that the planet killer weapon from the Original Series episode "The Doomsday Machine" is a prototype for a weapon against the Borg. David revisited this concept in a 2007 sequel novel, Before Dishonor, which features the Enterprise-E working with Spock and Seven of Nine to reactivate the original planet killer to stop the Borg.

In William Shatner's novel The Return, Spock is nearly assimilated by the Borg, but is saved because he mind-melded with V'ger, an earlier form of the Borg, and they assume he is already a Borg. Using the information he subconsciously acquired in the meld, Spock is able to lead a crew of Enterprise officers (consisting of the Enterprise-D crew, himself, Admiral McCoy, and the resurrected Kirk) in a Defiant-class ship to destroy the Borg central node, severing all branches of the Collective from each other and limiting their future threat.

In David Mack's novel trilogy Star Trek: Destiny, set over a year after Star Trek: Nemesis, the Borg stage a massive invasion of local space. Due to Kathryn Janeway crippling their infrastructure in "Endgame", the Borg fear for their survival and attempt to exterminate the Federation and its neighbors. They destroy the populations of numerous Federation worlds. The crews of the Enterprise-E, the Titan, and the Aventine (captained by newly commissioned Ezri Dax) make contact with the Caeliar, the advanced species that created the Borg, and enlist their aid to end the Borg threat once and for all.

DC Comics began producing Star Trek titles in 1984 and subsequently a Star Trek: The Next Generation six-issue mini-series (1988) followed by an on-going series (1989–1996). Fans had to wait four years for Locutus and the Borg to make their June 1993 comic book debut in DC Comics issue no. 47. In the story, titled "The Worst of Both Worlds", Jean-Luc and his crew are trapped in an alternate dimension where the Borg have destroyed the Federation and assimilated Earth. The crew encounters a more battle-hardened version of themselves, the last survivors of the Federation led by now Captain Riker, struggling to survive and continue the resistance. They agree to team-up to end the chaos caused by the Borg and their leader, Locutus. The arc lasts for four issues, reaching its conclusion in no. 50, a double-sized 68-page special. The Borg would only appear one more time later in the series, issue no. 75, in a story titled "War and Madness" which introduces a new villain, Enab, who has been severed from the Collective and wishes to return to it by any means necessary. Enab is based on the Batman villain Bane.

In the Doctor Who/Star Trek crossover comic, Assimilation2, the Borg join forces with the Cybermen. When the Cybermen subvert the Collective, the Enterprise-D crew work with the Eleventh Doctor and the Borg, restoring the Borg to full strength and erasing the Borg/Cyberman alliance from existence.

Writers Judith and Garfield Reeves-Stevens developed an unproduced idea for an Enterprise episode that would have featured Alice Krige as a Starfleet medical technician who encounters the Borg and is assimilated – thereby becoming the Borg Queen.

In the video game Star Trek: Armada, the Borg invades a Dominion cloning facility to create a clone of Jean-Luc Picard to create a new Locutus.

=== In video games ===
- Star Trek: The Next Generation: Birth of the Federation
- Star Trek: A Final Unity
- Star Trek: Armada
- Star Trek: Armada II
- Star Trek: Away Team
- Star Trek: Borg
- Star Trek: Voyager – Elite Force
- Star Trek: Elite Force II
- Star Trek: Starfleet Command III
- Star Trek: Encounters
- Star Trek: Invasion
- Star Trek: Legacy
- Star Trek: Conquest
- Star Trek Online
- Star Trek: Borg Contact
- Star Trek: Bridge Crew
- Star Trek Fleet Command

In March 2001, Activision announced a game called Star Trek: Borg Assimilator, in which the player would play a Borg. Though it was planned to be released that winter, Activision later cancelled the game's development.

== Critical reception and popular culture ==
Although Star Trek already had an analogue to the Soviet Union in the Klingon Empire, the Borg has also been analogized to Communism, to Japan, or to collectivism generally. As Star Trek mirrors the experience of America's foreign relations, scholars Patrick Jackson and Daniel Nexon suggest that the Borg demonstrates the impossibility of truly representing a collectivity in the American world order.

The depiction of the Borg cube in "Q Who" garnered the episode an Emmy Award nomination.

TV Guide named the Borg #4 in their 2013 list of the 60 Nastiest Villains of All Time. The Borg are noted as a powerful cybernetic force among the Star Trek aliens, although the Federation has generally been able to thwart their plans. The Borg are noted for their use of powerful starships (the Borg Cube for example), assimilation of other species, and for wanting to acquire new technologies.

The phrase "resistance is futile" became prevalent in popular culture from its use in the television show Star Trek: The Next Generation. The Borg uttered the phrase in several Star Trek episodes and the film Star Trek: First Contact (which used the phrase as the tagline for the 1996 film). Patrick Stewart's delivery of the line, as Locutus, in "The Best of Both Worlds" was ranked no. 93 in TV Land's list of "The 100 Greatest TV Quotes and Catchphrases". It was used as the title for an episode of the TV series Dexter as well as a song by Slovenian avant-garde music group Laibach on their 2014 album Spectre.

In 2013, Rolling Stone magazine ranked the Borg the second best villain of the Star Trek franchise, pointing out "they fly their ugly cube-ship wherever they please and force innocent species to join their ranks" and lamenting Captain Picard's assimilation in the episode "Best of Both Worlds".

In 2017, Den of Geek ranked Borg the 3rd best aliens of the Star Trek franchise.

In 2020, SyFy Wire listed several Borg episodes in their guide "Best of Borg Worlds", a guide to seven essential Borg-themed episodes to watch as background before Star Trek: Picard.

In 2020, CNET ranked the Borg cube the 2nd most powerful spacecraft of the Star Trek universe, after V'Ger.

== See also ==
- Brain in a vat
- Cybermen
- Experience machine
- Replicator (Stargate)
- Wirehead (science fiction)
