= Empire Earth III =

2007 video game

- Developer: Mad Doc Software
- Publisher: Sierra Entertainment
- Designer: Matthew Nordhaus
- Composer: Michael Gordon Shapiro
- Series: Empire Earth
- Engine: Gamebryo
- Platform: Microsoft Windows
- Release: NA: November 6, 2007; AU: November 9, 2007; EU: November 16, 2007
- Genre: Real-time strategy
- Modes: Single-player, multiplayer

Empire Earth III is a real-time strategy video game developed by Mad Doc Software and published by Sierra Entertainment, released on November 6, 2007. It is the last installment of the Empire Earth series.

Empire Earth III contains five epochs, fewer than other games in the series but covering roughly the same time period. The game features three factions: Middle Eastern, Western, and Far Eastern. Each faction comprises unique buildings, units, and technologies.

The game received widespread negative reviews.

== Gameplay ==
Similar to its predecessors, Empire Earth III is a real-time strategy game. It introduces several new units and weapons, as well as a new free-form campaign structure that is similar in style to other real-time strategy games, such as the Total War series. However, unlike Total War, the player advances through the entire course of history rather than staying in a specific time period.

There are three customizable civilizations to choose from which are Western, Middle-Eastern, and Far Eastern. Each civilization can be customized by the player to their choosing. Furthermore, each civilization features subfactions based on historical nations (e.g. the Far Eastern civilization contains China and Japan). Another new feature in Empire Earth III is certain nuclear weapons such as a nuclear cannon. In Empire Earth III, each region focuses on different styles of game play; for example, the Middle East has mobile buildings, the West has a few powerful units, and the Far East has masses of weak, swarming units combined with powerful mutants in the future.

The game's World Domination mode allows players to battle across a virtual earth which is split into many sections/provinces. While playing this mode, quests give the player optional tasks to accomplish while conquering the globe. The game contains five unique sections, loosely based on historical eras, Ancient, Medieval, Colonial, Modern, and Future.

== Development and release ==
Development of the game began in 2005, shortly after Empire Earth II was shipped. The game engine was built on Empire Earth II's engine using Gamebryo 2.0 middleware, but was almost completely rewritten to allow the developers to create improved visual effects, ragdoll physics, more detailed models and higher resolution textures. Instead of making the units more realistic, Mad Doc Software worked to achieve a more "cartoonish" look.

On April 27, 2007 the American television show Numb3rs aired some footage of the game on CBS while it was still in development. The demo of Empire Earth III was released on November 1. The retail version of the game was released on November 6, 2007 in the US and November 16, 2007 in Europe.

A patch became available two days after the game's release. Empire Earth III is the first game in the series to be a Games for Windows title.

On November 12, 2007, a Gamespy arena portal was added for updates and stats.

== Reception ==
Review scores
Publication	Score
IGN	5.4 of 10
GameSpot	3.5 of 10
GameSpy	2 of 5

Empire Earth III garnered generally negative reviews, and holds an average of 51% on aggregate web site GameRankings. GameSpot gave it 3.5 of 10 saying "The developer's questionable sense of taste and humor is also on display in the visuals and sound... Empire Earth III has been dumbed down to the point of irrelevance." IGN gave it a 5.4 of 10 saying "the animations aren't very good and the performance leaves a lot to be desired". GameSpy had similar complaints: "bugs, muddled combat, or weak AI aren't things that strategy fans have to live with." Game Revolution gave the game a D−, stating "Honestly, if the game didn't try to make you hate it, it would be perfectly tolerable, maybe even enjoyable." Mad Doc Software has since removed all references to the development of Empire Earth III from their website. As of 2017, Rebellion Developments owns the IP.
