= Rockstar New England =

American video game developer

Rockstar New England, Inc.
- Formerly: Mad Doc Software, LLC (1999–2008)
- Type: Subsidiary
- Industry: Video games
- Founded: November 1999; 27 years ago
- Founder: Ian Lane Davis
- Headquarters: Andover, Massachusetts, US
- Key people: Ian Lane Davis (studio director); Ken Davis (studio director)
- Products: Empire Earth series (2002–2007); Bully: Scholarship Edition
- Number of employees: ≈150 (2026)
- Parent: Rockstar Games (2008–present)

Rockstar New England, Inc. (formerly Mad Doc Software, LLC) is an American video game developer and a studio of Rockstar Games based in Andover, Massachusetts. Ian Lane Davis founded the company as Mad Doc Software in November 1999 after working as a technical director for Activision. The studio worked with Activision on Star Trek: Armada before leading the development of its sequel, Star Trek: Armada II. Starting in 2002, Mad Doc was the principal developer of the Empire Earth series, developing two games and two expansions. While the successful Empire Earth II landed the company publishing contracts with Rockstar Games and Bethesda Softworks, Empire Earth III was a critical and commercial failure and led to the end of the series. Mad Doc developed Star Trek: Legacy for Bethesda Softworks and Bully: Scholarship Edition for Rockstar Games. After the latter was released in March 2008, Rockstar Games's parent company, Take-Two Interactive, bought Mad Doc and integrated it with Rockstar Games as Rockstar New England. Under Rockstar Games, the studio worked on a sequel to Bully until its developers were reallocated to projects like Max Payne 3.

== History ==
=== Early years and Empire Earth (1999–2007) ===
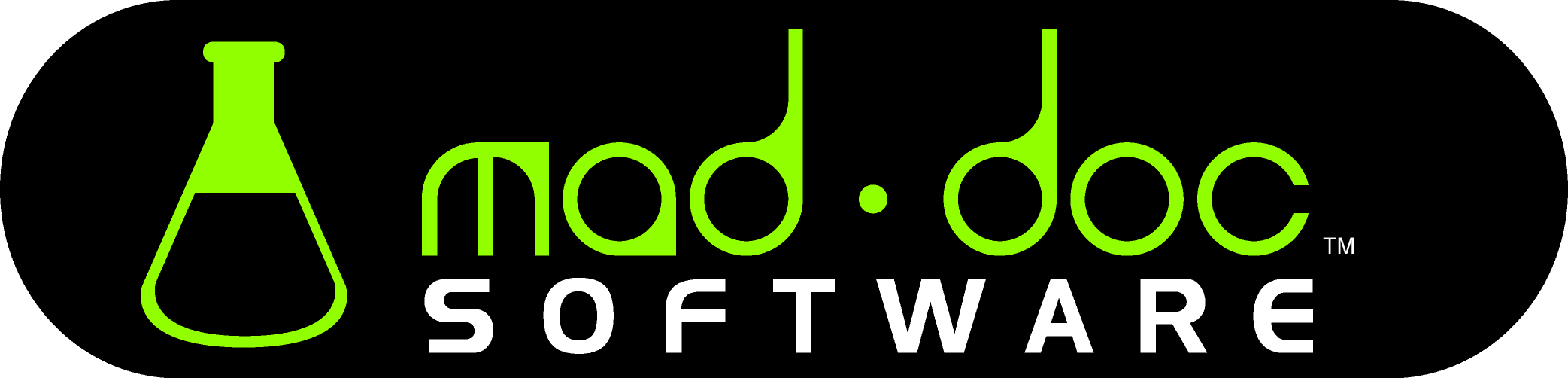
A former Mad Doc Software logo

Rockstar New England was founded as Mad Doc Software by Ian Lane Davis. A native of Andover, Massachusetts, he first came into contact with video games while enrolled at Andover public schools in the late 1970s and early 1980s. He frequently visited arcades and, while at Doherty Junior High around 1982, Davis received his first computer, an Apple II Plus. Among his favorite games were Ultima, Wizardry, and One on One: Dr. J vs. Larry Bird. He later attended Phillips Academy until 1987, graduated from Dartmouth College with majors in mathematics, English, and computer science in 1991, and obtained a doctorate in artificial intelligence and robotics from Carnegie Mellon University in 1996. Davis landed his first job with the video game company Activision in Santa Monica, California, acting as a technical director from 1996 to 1999. During this time, he worked on Dark Reign: The Future of War, Battlezone, Dark Reign: Rise of the Shadowhand, and Civilization: Call to Power.

Davis left Activision to move back to Andover, where he founded Mad Doc in November 1999. With him as the only employee, the company took on contract work and consulting jobs to hire further staff. Davis did not seek venture capital, despite several people urging him to do so. Mad Doc's first projects were development support on Star Trek: Armada and additional programming and art for Call to Power II, both released by Activision. In 2000, the studio relocated to neighboring Lawrence, first occupying "cramped, temporary quarters" before it moved into 6,600 square feet (610 m^{2}) of renovated office space on the fifth floor of the Everett Mills. Mad Doc was the first video game company in Lawrence, and Davis hoped its presence would attract more in the future, which ultimately did not happen. Nine months after its founding, Mad Doc had grown to employ ten people and began contacting publishers for development projects. It led the development of Star Trek: Armada II for Activision, initially with eight developers. When the game was announced in March 2001, Mad Doc mostly comprised former developers from Looking Glass Studios, a defunct studio previously based in nearby Cambridge. By July 2001, it had grown to 20 employees, and Davis believed the staff count would never exceed 30. Star Trek: Armada II was released in November 2001. Mad Doc further inherited the development of Jane's Attack Squadron from Looking Glass Studios, which had been canceled with that studio's closure. The finished game was released in March 2002.

In May 2002, Sierra Entertainment announced Mad Doc as the developer of Empire Earth: The Art of Conquest, an expansion pack for the 2001 game Empire Earth. While the expansion received mixed reviews when it was released in September 2002, Mad Doc remained the principal developer of the Empire Earth series. Around this time, Mad Doc collaborated with Splash Damage on Wolfenstein: Enemy Territory, developing its single-player component. Activision, as the game's publisher, scrapped this portion in February 2003 because its development "did not progress as anticipated". With Gas Powered Games, Mad Doc worked on Dungeon Siege: Legends of Aranna, an expansion pack for 2002's Dungeon Siege. Legends of Aranna was released in November 2003, and Mad Doc published a free bonus pack in September 2004. By January 2004, Mad Doc had 48 employees and US$3.5 million in annual revenue. The studio's Empire Earth II was released in April 2005, followed by the expansion Empire Earth II: The Art of Supremacy in February 2006. The success of the game and its expansion led Mad Doc to publishing contracts with Bethesda Softworks and Rockstar Games. With the former, the studio developed Star Trek: Legacy after Bethesda Softworks had acquired a license for the Star Trek franchise. The game was released in November 2006. Mad Doc then developed another Empire Earth entry, Empire Earth III. The production cost roughly $10 million and the game came out in November 2007. Due to a multitude of issues, Empire Earth III became a critical and commercial failure and is considered to have ended the Empire Earth franchise.

=== Acquisition and projects under Rockstar Games (2007–present) ===
Under its contract with Rockstar Games, Mad Doc developed an enhanced version of Bully, which had been developed by Rockstar Games's Rockstar Vancouver studio and released to commercial success for the PlayStation 2 in 2006. Mad Doc remastered the game and added further missions, characters, and items. The version was announced as Bully: Scholarship Edition in July 2007 for the Wii and Xbox 360. By December 2007, Mad Doc and its roughly 100 employees had relocated to a 20,400 square feet (1,900 m^{2}) office in Ballardvale, a village within Andover. Davis stated that the studio would remain in Andover because it was his "favorite place", where he lived with his wife, Vicky, and was planning to raise his children. Shaun McDermott, while chief financial officer of the studio, regarded the location as an asset because of the wide range of lifestyles that employees could live in nearby communities. In late 2007, Davis was named the "Entrepreneur of the Year" by the Greater Boston Chamber of Commerce. Around this time, Mad Doc created maps for the multiplayer mode of Turok, which was developed by Propaganda Games and released in February 2008.

Bully: Scholarship Edition was released in March 2008. Take-Two Interactive, Rockstar Games's parent company, acquired Mad Doc in the same month for $6.068 million: $3.740 million in cash, 53,033 shares of its unregistered common stock (valued at $1.353 million), and $975,000 in development advances. The acquisition was announced on April 4, 2008, and Mad Doc was integrated with Rockstar Games as Rockstar New England. Davis remained with the studio as the studio director, alongside Ken Davis. Its employees initially reacted positively to the acquisition due to the reputation and size of Rockstar Games. Over time, the former Mad Doc workplace culture faded while crunch increased. Some employees "felt they were expected by other people within the company to prove their dedication to Rockstar through long hours, and that they would be 'harassed' when trying to leave the studio". In June 2009, Rockstar New England laid off approximately 10% of its staff, including several artists and the entire quality assurance (QA) department. According to an insider speaking with Kotaku, Rockstar Games sought to have one dedicated QA studio instead of having QA departments at its other studios. Other employees reported at the time that the severance packages were "fairly generous" and that Rockstar Games was helping some of the affected employees get new jobs. One laid-off artist later claimed he had not received such assistance.

Under Rockstar Games, Rockstar New England commenced several projects. It created the Windows version of Bully: Scholarship Edition, which was released in October 2008, and assisted the development of Grand Theft Auto IV: The Lost and Damned, Grand Theft Auto: The Ballad of Gay Tony, and Red Dead Redemption. The studio also began developing a sequel to Bully while Rockstar Vancouver was allocated to Max Payne 3. Some employees believed the project to be a test for the newly acquired studio to prove it was worth the investment. Roughly 50–70 people, most of the studio, were involved with the game at some point. The team envisioned a small open world with high interactivity, such as actions towards non-player characters (NPCs) having long-term consequences and every building being enterable, including by force. For the latter, Rockstar New England developed a detailed glass fragmentation system. A vertical slice of Bully 2 was created and playable. However, in 2010, the studio began reallocating the game's developers to other projects. It joined Rockstar Vancouver, Rockstar London, and Rockstar Toronto in the development of Max Payne 3, which was released in May 2012. The game reused the glass fragmentation mechanic previously designed for Bully 2.

In early 2013, Rockstar New England completed its three-month process of moving from Ballardvale to Andover's Dundee Park. The studio worked alongside all other Rockstar Games studios on Red Dead Redemption 2, which was released in October 2018. The mechanic of consequences from NPC interactions that the studio had created for Bully 2 was incorporated into this game. For Grand Theft Auto VI, released in November 2026, Rockstar New England was also responsible for NPCs' behavioral design, including how they remember interactions with the player. By the time of the game's release, the studio had approximately 150 employees.

== Games developed ==
=== As Mad Doc Software ===
List of games developed by Rockstar New England, 2000–2008
Year	Title	Platform(s)	Publisher(s)	Notes
2000	Star Trek: Armada	Windows	Activision	Supportive development for Activision
2000	Call to Power II	Windows	Activision	Supportive development for Activision
2001	Star Trek: Armada II	Windows	Activision	
2002	Jane's Attack Squadron	Windows	Xicat Interactive	
2002	Empire Earth: The Art of Conquest	Windows	Sierra Entertainment	
2003	Dungeon Siege: Legends of Aranna	Windows	Microsoft Game Studios	Co-developed with Gas Powered Games
2005	Empire Earth II	Windows	Vivendi Universal Games	
2006	Empire Earth II: The Art of Supremacy	Windows	Vivendi Universal Games	
2006	Star Trek: Legacy	Windows, Xbox 360	Bethesda Softworks	
2007	Empire Earth III	Windows	Vivendi Games	
2008	Turok	PlayStation 3, Windows, Xbox 360	Disney Interactive Studios	Supportive development for Propaganda Games
2008	Bully: Scholarship Edition	Android, iOS, Wii, Windows, Xbox 360	Rockstar Games	

=== As Rockstar New England ===
List of games developed by Rockstar New England, 2008–present
Year	Title	Platform(s)	Publisher(s)	Notes
2009	Grand Theft Auto IV: The Lost and Damned	PlayStation 3, Windows, Xbox 360	Rockstar Games	Supportive development for Rockstar North
2009	Grand Theft Auto: The Ballad of Gay Tony	PlayStation 3, Windows, Xbox 360	Rockstar Games	Supportive development for Rockstar North
2010	Red Dead Redemption	Nintendo Switch, PlayStation 3, PlayStation 4, Windows, Xbox 360	Rockstar Games	Supportive development for Rockstar San Diego
2011	L.A. Noire	Nintendo Switch, PlayStation 3, PlayStation 4, Windows, Xbox 360, Xbox One	Rockstar Games	Supportive development for Team Bondi
2012	Max Payne 3	macOS, PlayStation 3, Windows, Xbox 360	Rockstar Games	Developed as part of Rockstar Studios
2013	Grand Theft Auto V	PlayStation 3, PlayStation 4, PlayStation 5, Windows, Xbox 360, Xbox One, Xbox Series X/S	Rockstar Games	Supportive development for Rockstar North
2018	Red Dead Redemption 2	PlayStation 4, Stadia, Windows, Xbox One	Rockstar Games	
2026	Grand Theft Auto VI	PlayStation 5, Xbox Series X/S	Rockstar Games	

=== Canceled ===
- Wolfenstein: Enemy Territory (single-player portion)
- Bully 2
