= Vikings: The Strategy of Ultimate Conquest =

1996 video game

- Developer: Random Games
- Publisher: GT Interactive
- Platforms: Windows; Macintosh
- Release: March 1996
- Genre: Action Adventure

Vikings: The Strategy of Ultimate Conquest is a 1996 video game developed by Random Games and published by GT Interactive. It was narrated by actor Michael Dorn of "Star Trek: The Next Generation.

== Gameplay ==
Vikings: The Strategy of Ultimate Conquest casts players as ambitious Viking warriors in 9th-century Scandinavia seeking to conquer over 160 provinces across Norway, Denmark, and Sweden. The gameplay is a blend of strategy, adventure, and narrative choice. Players manage resources, negotiate trade deals with nearly 300 cities, and gather intelligence by charming tavern patrons. The journey unfolds across land and sea, combining tactical invasions with character-driven quests for ancient relics and artifacts. Combat plays a central role—ranging from skirmishes with bandits to large-scale village raids, complete with burning buildings and looting spoils. Decisions such as marriage and alliance-building shape the course of a warrior's lifetime, influencing both reputation and territorial gains. Each session offers a different strategic landscape, as provinces evolve in strength and resistance. With difficulty levels spanning from novice to saga legend, the game emphasizes replayability and the dynamic consequences of player choices.

== Development ==
Vikings: The Strategy of Ultimate Conquest was developed by Random Games, a company founded in 1985.

== Reception ==
Reception

Review scores
Publication	Score
Computer Gaming World	1/5
Power Play	32%
PC Player	1/5
PC Games	D

Computer Gaming World gave Vikings: The Strategy of Ultimate Conquest a score of 1 out of 5 stating "Undoubtedly, this game would have looked good 10 years ago. But, today, this type of boring gameplay just looks old, canned and cliché". PC Games called Vikings: The Strategy of Ultimate Conquest disappointing.
