= Empire Earth II: The Art of Supremacy =

- Developer: Mad Doc Software
- Publisher: Vivendi Universal Games (Note: Released under the Sierra Entertainment brand name)
- Designer: Ian Lane Davis
- Series: Empire Earth
- Engine: Gamebryo
- Platform: Microsoft Windows
- Release: NA: February 14, 2006; EU: March 10, 2006
- Genre: Real-time strategy
- Modes: Single-player, multiplayer

Empire Earth II: The Art of Supremacy is the expansion pack for Empire Earth II. Released on February 15, 2006, and developed by Mad Doc Software. Some of the new additions to Empire Earth II were four new civilizations and several other new features. Several more campaigns were also added, which focused on the Napoleonic Wars, Ancient Egypt and a third which was a futuristic campaign centered on the Maasai.

Art of Supremacy was developed by Mad Doc Software, the makers of the Empire Earth II, and was re-released with Empire Earth II in the Empire Earth II: Platinum Edition. Art of Supremacy was given mediocre reviews by critics, with an average of 61% according to GameRankings.

== Gameplay ==
See Empire Earth II Gameplay

== Additions to the game ==
The game adds three new campaigns and two new turning points missions. It also has a new region (African) with two civilizations (Maasai and Zulu) and two new civilizations in existing regions (France and Russia), which are in the Western region. It allows soldiers to become heroes if they get a certain amount of kills. These Heroes can form groups (called armies) with other soldiers and doing so enables all soldiers to become stronger. The expansion pack introduces an option to have native tribes, who are neutral players. Players can leave them alone, ally with them, or go to war with them. There is also a new crown power called the supreme leader. Any leader or hero can become this, and it allows them to have stronger leader powers and form stronger armies.

== New campaigns ==
The expansion features three new campaigns, each of which is divided into separate scenarios like the rest of the Empire Earth franchise. The first campaign is in the Egyptian times involving Pharaohs. The second is based in the Russian era of the Napoleonic Wars. The third is a campaign based in the future. It involves Africa and the Maasai tribe fighting for liberation.

=== Egyptian Campaign ===
The Egyptian Campaign focuses on the time period between 2183 and 2152 BC, focusing on one of the Pharaoh's most trusted generals. In the campaign, the player undertakes a variety of missions, including defeating bandit tribes and eradicating religious cults, leading up to fighting a sworn enemy of Egypt in the last mission.

=== Russian Campaign ===
The Russian Campaign takes place from 1805 to 1813, during the era of the Napoleonic Wars. The main character is Tsar Alexander I, the "Tsar of all Russia". Most of the scenarios focus on giving resources to allies, so the player can build up an army in order to defeat the French Army under Napoleon. This occurs in the second to last mission, where Napoleon has invaded Russia. A favored strategy of players playing this mission is to use a strategy similar to the "scorched earth" policy used by Russia in both the Napoleonic Wars and The Great Patriotic War (World War II).

=== Maasai Campaign ===
The Maasai Campaign takes place in the near future, specifically from the summer of 2037 to the spring of 2039. The entire campaign centers on the theme of freedom, as in this campaign greedy corporations are turning the various tribes in Kenya against one another. Eventually, the Maasai gain enough power to liberate Kenya from the clutches of disaster, and Africa becomes a major player on the global stage.

== Reception ==
Review scores
Publication	Score
Eurogamer	6 of 10
GameSpy	2 of 5
GameSpot	5.4 of 10
Strategy Informer	5.8 of 10

Art of Supremacy earned average reviews, with critics averaging 57%. However, it was generally praised for its new features and gameplay. Some of the critics weren't satisfied; GameSpot gave the game a 5.4 out of 10, saying "French and Russian civilizations have been done to death in other RTS games; many odds and ends would more appropriately have been provided in a patch or in the original Empire Earth II; a lot of the rule tweaks are worthless." GameSpy disapproved giving it a mere 2/5 stars, saying "Generic civilizations; new multiplayer modes aren't very exciting; bad campaign voice-overs and 'gimmicky' maps". Strategy Informer gave an average score of 5.8 out of 10, saying "Unfortunately, the overall impression that this expansion leaves is that there really isn't much point to it at all". Eurogamer gave it a 6 out of 10 saying other strategy games had superior graphics by then "booting up the expansion pack to discover that it suddenly looked really, really old".
