= Dundee Park =

Business park in Andover, Massachusetts

Coordinates: 42.655277°N 71.146487°W

- Interactive map of Dundee Park
- Location: Andover, Massachusetts
- Opening date: 1894
- Developer: John Smith, Peter Smith, John Dove

Dundee Park is a suburban business park located in the town of Andover, Massachusetts, situated across from the old Andover train station.

== History ==
Originally known as the Smith & Dove mills, the Dundee Park business strip took shape in the 18th century, helping bolster the Industrial Revolution in New England, prior to which the area and its economy was merely agriculturally-grounded. The Smith & Dove mills, founded by Scottish merchants John Smith, Peter Smith, and John Dove in 1835, attracted more individuals to the Andover, Massachusetts area seeking work, and made common goods more available. Nearly a century later, a myriad of individual mills had been erected in the area, focused primarily on textile development. A notable cotton mill was commissioned in 1807 by Abraham Marland, an Episcopalian merchant from Lancashire, known for his founding of Christ Church in Andover. The wool production operation headed by Paschal Abbott also shifted to the town around 1815, operating on Red Spring Road near Dundee Park, but was later sold to Smith & Dove, the United States' original manufacturer of linen and benefactor of Memorial Hall Library, in 1843, upon a decline in demand for wool. The acquisition of this mill, in addition to a series of other mills, led to the area's colloquial name, the Smith & Dove mills. Approximately two decades after the purchase of Abbott's wool mill, the Smith & Dove mills in Andover were successfully fabricating cloth and thread at a large volume.

The mills continued to expand, eventually becoming known collectively as Dundee Park. Soon, however, the company was purchased by Ludlow Manufacturing in 1927, after which the area was claimed by many companies and investors, most notably the Indian Ridge Company. Eventually, the Family Bank and Lawrence Savings assisted in repurposing Dundee Park, from a mill area to a business park. More than fifty years later, two new buildings were constructed in Dundee Park. At the turn of the century, property managing firm Ozzy Properties purchased a significant portion of the area, and helped allure start-ups and other businesses to it.

== Businesses ==
Dundee Park is home to a diverse number of start-ups, small businesses, and other companies.

- 1st Vision Inc.
- Andover Auto School
- Burke Christine
- Cervizzi's Martial Arts Academy of Andover
- Classic Closets of Andover
- Diana Dow Massage
- Integrated Behavioral Care
- Oxygen Mind and Body
- The Real School of Music
- Rockstar New England
- Tiny Tunes
- Yang's Fitness and Wellness Center

== Future of Dundee Park ==
At a town meeting in May 2015, voters helped create the Historical Mill District, often abbreviated as the HMD, an area comprising Dundee Park and other local buildings and roads. Targeting Dundee Park as an area capable of smart growth, the Town of Andover, along with the HMD Task Force, discussed design guidelines in order to highlight Dundee Park's architectural and historic antiquity, as well as transform it into a productive, sprawling area. The guidelines, originally discussed on January 26, 2017, were officially adopted by the Andover Planning Board on February 13, 2018.
