= Michael Dorn =

American actor (born 1952)

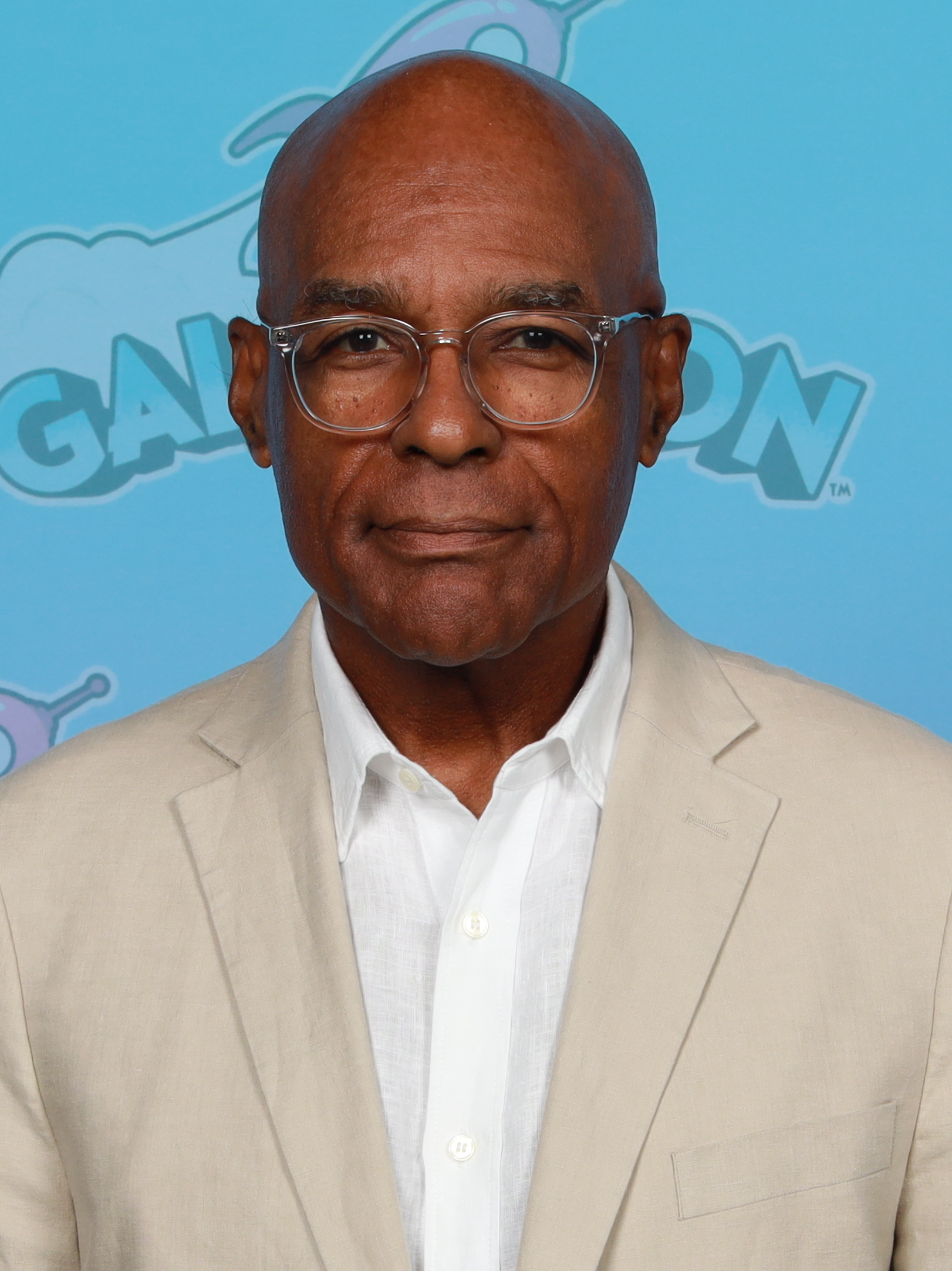
- Dorn at GalaxyCon San Jose in 2024
- Born: December 9, 1952 (age 73); Luling, Texas, U.S.
- Education: Pasadena City College
- Occupation: Actor
- Years active: 1976–present

Michael Dorn (born December 9, 1952) is an American actor best known for his role as the Klingon character Worf in the Star Trek franchise, appearing in all seven seasons of the television series Star Trek: The Next Generation (1987–1994), and later reprising the role in seasons four through seven of Star Trek: Deep Space Nine (1995–1999) and season three of Star Trek: Picard (2023). Dorn has appeared more times as a regular cast member than any other Star Trek actor in the franchise's history, spanning five films and 290 television episodes.

Outside of the Star Trek franchise, Dorn has appeared in the television series CHiPs (1979–1982), and has had voice roles as Coldstone and Taurus in the animated series Gargoyles (1994–1997), Kalibak in the DC Animated Universe, the eponymous protagonist of I Am Weasel (1997–2000), Mata Nui in Bionicle media, Lord Darkar in the Nickelodeon dub of Winx Club (2011), Castle (2009–2016) as a psychotherapist, Captain Mozar in Teenage Mutant Ninja Turtles (2015–2016) and Battle Beast in Invincible (2021–present).

Outside of shows and movies, he has had voice roles in several Star Trek-related games, as well as more obscure voice roles such as Marcus and the secondary antagonist Frank Horrigan of the action RPG game Fallout 2 (1998) and a Krogan character in Mass Effect 2 (2010), among many other similar roles. He later reprised his role as Marcus in the game Fallout: New Vegas (2010).

== Early life ==
Dorn was born in Luling, Texas, the son of Allie Lee (née Nauls) and Arfentress ("Fentress") Dorn Jr. He grew up in Pasadena, California, where he studied radio and television production at Pasadena City College. Following his graduation, he pursued a career in music as a performer with several different rock-music bands, traveling to San Francisco and then back to Los Angeles.

== Career ==
=== Early work ===
Dorn first appeared on-screen in Rocky, in an uncredited role as Apollo Creed's bodyguard. Two years later, he appeared as a guest star on a 1978 episode of the television show W.E.B.. Impressed by his work, the show's producer introduced Dorn to an agent, through whom he met acting teacher Charles E. Conrad. Dorn studied with Conrad for six months, until he landed a regular role on the crime drama series CHiPs.

=== Star Trek ===
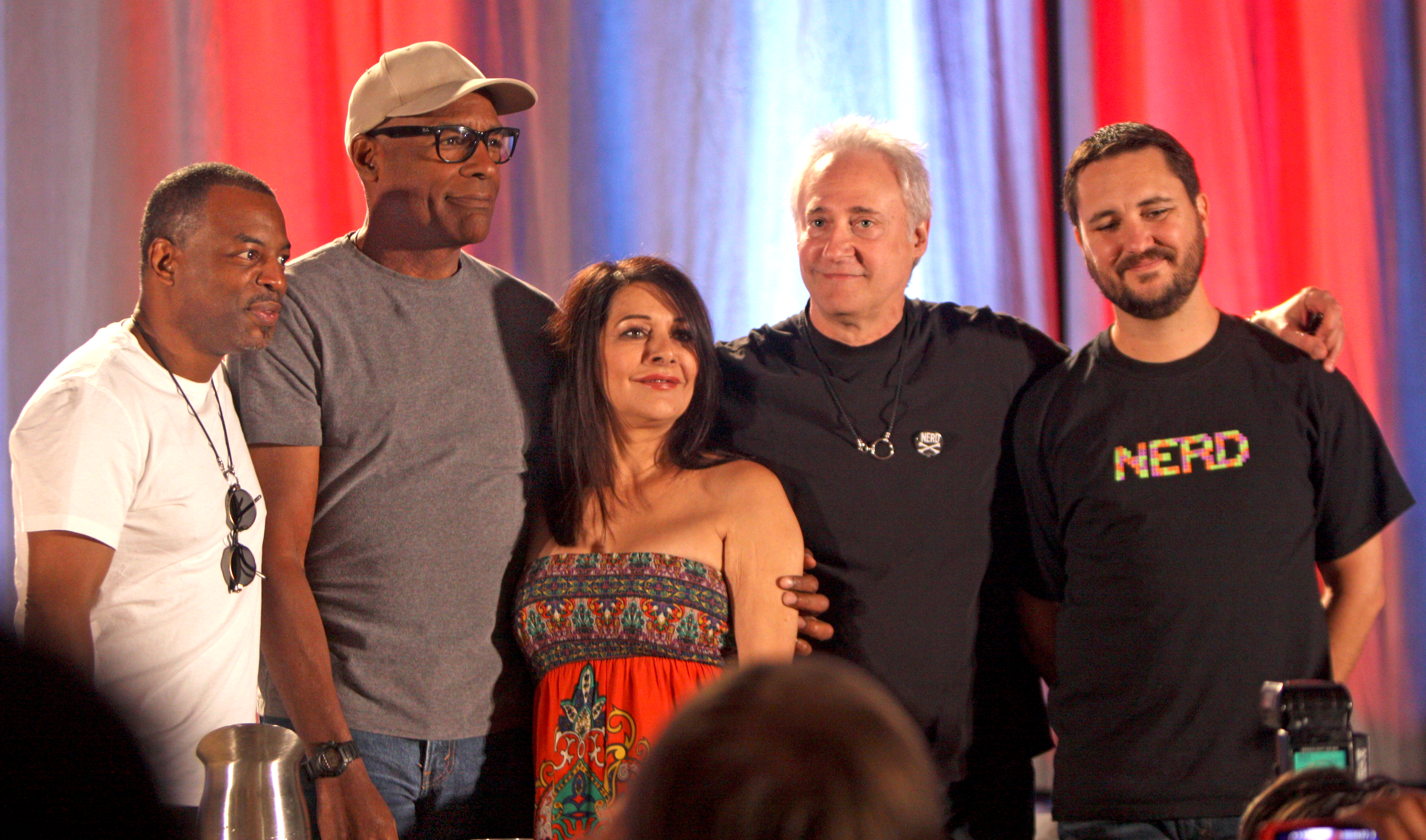
Michael Dorn at the 2012 Phoenix Comic-Con with the cast of Next Generation. (L to R: LeVar Burton, Dorn, Marina Sirtis, Brent Spiner, and Wil Wheaton)

Dorn's most notable role to date is that of the Klingon Starfleet officer Lieutenant (later Lt. Commander) Worf in Star Trek: The Next Generation and Star Trek: Deep Space Nine. Dorn was the last of the main actors to be cast in The Next Generation, and prepared for his audition by isolating himself from the other actors and remaining taciturn through his interview, mimicking the personality of the character. His character proved so popular amongst fans that Dorn was added to the cast of spin-off series Deep Space Nine in an effort to boost ratings.

Dorn (as Worf) has the record for the most on-screen appearances of any Star Trek character. As Worf, he appeared in 175 episodes of Star Trek: The Next Generation (missing only the episodes "Code of Honor", "Haven", and "Shades of Gray"), 102 episodes of Deep Space Nine, four Star Trek movies, and seven episodes of Star Trek: Picard, bringing his total to 288 appearances as the character. He also appeared as Worf's ancestor, Colonel Worf, in the 1991 film Star Trek VI: The Undiscovered Country and directed the Star Trek: Deep Space Nine episodes "In the Cards", "Inquisition", and "When It Rains...", and the Star Trek: Enterprise episode "Two Days and Two Nights".

He was one of six actors to reprise his role, in voiceover, for the Star Trek: Captain's Chair virtual reality game. In 2014, he participated in the fan-produced Star Trek episode "Fairest of Them All", giving his voice to the computer of the Mirror Universe Enterprise.

In 2012, Dorn announced a desire to return to his Klingon role in a television series tentatively titled Star Trek: Captain Worf. He said:

I had come up with the idea because I love [Worf] and I think he's a character that hasn't been fully developed and hasn't been fully realized. Once I started thinking about it, it became obvious to me that I wanted to at least put it out there, which I have, and the response has been pretty amazing. We've been contacted by different individuals–I can't say who and all that–about wanting to come on board and be part of this.

In April 2022, it was announced that he would reprise his role as Worf in the third season of Star Trek: Picard, which aired in 2023.

=== Other work ===
Dorn has appeared in a number of TV shows, films and video games. He has been the spokesman for Neutrogena T-Gel Shampoo, and has appeared in a Dodge Dart car commercial. He voiced Marcus and Frank Horrigan in Fallout 2 and would later reprise the role of Marcus in Fallout: New Vegas. He appeared in a 2012 tongue-in-cheek television commercial for Chrysler as "Future Guy", a time traveler sent from the future to assist development of the 2013 Dodge Dart. He also plays the role of General Thain in the Castlevania: Hymn of Blood web series.

Following his Star Trek career, he had supporting roles in a number of independent feature films, including Shadow Hours (2000), Lessons for an Assassin (2001) and The Santa Clause trilogy, in which he appeared in a minor role as the Sandman. Dorn reprised his role as Worf for cameo appearances on Webster and Family Guy, the latter with several of his fellow Next Generation castmates. He had a recurring role on the television series Castle, playing the therapist of NYPD police detective Kate Beckett.

Dorn was reported in 2011 to be playing the lead role in Harry Lennix's adaptation of Henry IV, titled H4, and had shot the entire film. When re-shoots became necessary later, Dorn was no longer available for scheduling, so Lennix replaced him himself in the final version. Attendees at the viewing at the Shakespeare Association of America in 2012 wrote about their expectations of Dorn's appearance. Dorn had worn an eye-patch during production because of a recent eye surgery, which Lennix continued as a costume choice in re-shoots.

In March 2023, Dorn was announced as the writer for a comic starring Steel (John Henry Irons), whom he voiced in Superman: The Animated Series. Steelworks #1 was published on June 6, 2023, with art by Sami Basri.

Dorn provides the voice of the character Battle Beast in the animated series Invincible.

== Personal life ==
A member of the Aircraft Owners and Pilots Association, Dorn is an accomplished pilot. He has flown with the Blue Angels and the Thunderbirds. He has owned several jet aircraft, including a Lockheed T-33 Shooting Star, which he jokingly referred to as his "starship", a North American F-86 Sabre, and a North American Sabreliner. As of mid-2026, he'd reduced his fleet to one aircraft, a Piper PA-46. Dorn also serves on several aviation organizations, one of which is the Air Force Aviation Heritage Foundation, where he is on the advisory board. Dorn was interviewed for the "Private Jets" episode of Modern Marvels on The History Channel.

Dorn stated in a 2010 interview that he had been diagnosed with an "early early" stage of prostate cancer, which led him to become a vegan.

== Filmography ==
=== Film ===
Year	Title	Role	Notes
1976	Rocky	Apollo Creed's bodyguard	Film debut; uncredited
1977	Demon Seed	bit part (uncredited)	
1985	Jagged Edge	Dan Hislan	
1991	Star Trek VI: The Undiscovered Country	Klingon Defense Attorney (Colonel Worf)	
1994	Star Trek Generations	Lieutenant Commander Worf	
1995	Timemaster	Chairman	
1995	Mission Critical	Commander	
1996	Star Trek: First Contact	Lieutenant Commander Worf	
1997	Menno's Mind	Simon, Menno's Friend	
1998	Star Trek: Insurrection	Lieutenant Commander Worf	
2000	Shadow Hours	Detective Thomas Greenwood	
2000	The Prophet's Game	Bob Bowman	
2001	The Gristle	Tar	
2001	Mach 2	Rogers	
2001	Ali	Black pilot	
2002	Face Value	Hitman	
2002	Star Trek: Nemesis	Lieutenant Commander Worf	
2002	The Santa Clause 2	Sandman	Cameo
2003	Shade	Jack Thornhill	
2003	Lessons For an Assassin	Quinn	
2003	The Interplanetary Surplus Male and Amazon Women of Outer Space	Sam the Bartender	Direct-to-video
2005	Heart of the Beholder	Lieutenant Larson	
2005	Thru the Moebius Strip	King Tor	Voice
2006	The Santa Clause 3: The Escape Clause	Sandman	
2007	Fist of the Warrior	Arnold Denton	
2007	Night Skies	Kyle	
2007	The Deep Below	Carl Bennett	
2009	Bionicle: The Legend Reborn	Mata Nui	Voice, direct-to-video
2012	Strange Frame	Guardship Commander	
2015	Ted 2	Rick	
2019	Wonder Woman: Bloodlines	Ferdinand the Minotaur	Voice, direct-to-video

=== Television ===
Year	Title	Role	Notes
1979–1982	CHiPs	Officer Jebediah Turner	31 episodes
1981	Knots Landing	Paramedic	Episode: "The Vigil"
1985	227	Lester's friend	1 episode
1985	Hunter	Highway Patrolman	Episode: "Waiting for Mr. Wrong"
1986–1987	Days of Our Lives	Jimmy	
1987	Punky Brewster	Councilman Weatherwax	Episode: "Fighting City Hall"
1987–1994	Star Trek: The Next Generation	Lieutenant Worf	Main role, 7 seasons
1988	Reading Rainbow	Himself	Episode: "The Bionic Bunny Show"
1989	Webster	Lieutenant Worf	Episode: "Webtrek"
1991–1994	Dinosaurs	Elders, Solomon the Great, WESAYSO Announcer	Voice, recurring role
1994	SWAT Kats: The Radical Squadron	Mutilor	Episode: "When Strikes Mutilor"
1994–1997	Gargoyles	Coldstone, Taurus	Recurring role
1995	Amanda and the Alien	Lieutenant Vint	Television film
1995	World of Wonder	Himself – Host	Science show on the Discovery Channel
1995	The Outer Limits	Pete Claridge	Episode: "The Voyage Home"
1995–1996	Fantastic Four	Gorgon	Voice, 2 episodes
1995–1999	Star Trek: Deep Space Nine	Lieutenant Commander Worf	Main role, 4 seasons
1996	Adventures from the Book of Virtues	Apollo	Voice, episode: "Humility"
1996	Captain Simian & the Space Monkeys	Lord Nebula	Voice, 2 episodes
1996	The Real Adventures of Jonny Quest	Tala	Voice, episode: "The Dark Mountain"
1996–2000	Superman: The Animated Series	Kalibak, John Henry Irons / Steel	Voice, recurring role
1997	Street Fighter	The Warrior King	Voice, episode: "The Warrior King"; uncredited
1997–2000	I Am Weasel	I.M. Weasel	Voice, main role
1998	Haunted History	Narrator	Voice, episode: "Haunted History: Charleston"
1998–1999	Hercules	Minotaur	Voice, 2 episodes
2000	Martial Law	Councilman Tynan	Episode: "No Quarter"
2001	7th Heaven	Mr. Johnson	
2002	Through the Fire	Michael Collins	Television film
2002	The Zeta Project	Colonel Lemak	Voice, 2 episodes
2002	Static Shock	Reverend Anderson	Voice, episode: "Frozen Out"
2003	Justice League	Kalibak	Voice, 2 episodes
2003	Kim Possible: A Sitch in Time	Rufus 3000	Voice, television film
2003	Spider-Man: The New Animated Series	Kraven the Hunter	Voice, 2 episodes
2003–2005	Duck Dodgers	Martian Centurion Robots, Captain Long, Klunkin Warrior	Voice, main role
2004–2005	Megas XLR	R.E.G.I.S., Bot #14, Guard	Voice, 2 episodes
2004–2007	Danny Phantom	Fright Knight	Voice, 4 episodes
2005	Justice League Unlimited	Kalibak	Voice, episode: "The Ties That Bind"
2005	Descent	General Fielding	Television film
2005, 2009	Family Guy	Lieutenant Worf, Himself	Voice, 2 episodes
2006	All You've Got	Fire Captain Diaz	Television film
2006	A.I. Assault	General Buskirk	Television film
2006	Fallen Angels	Taylor	Television film
2007	Squirrel Boy	Reuben Belmont	Voice, 2 episodes
2007	Ben 10	Viktor, Benvicktor	Voice, 2 episodes
2007	Without a Trace	Nathan Riggs	Episode: "Absolom"
2008–2009	Heroes	US President	2 episodes
2009	Batman: The Brave and the Bold	Kru'll the Eternal	Voice, episode: "Menace of the Conqueror Caveman!"
2009	Heroes	President of the United States	Episode: "An Invisible Thread"
2010	Adventure Time	Gork, Monster Head #2	Voice, episode: "Freak City"
2010	It's a Trap!	Lieutenant Worf	
2011–2015	Castle	Dr. Carver Burke	Recurring role; 6 episodes
2011	Winx Club	Lord Darkar	Voice, recurring role
2011	The Super Hero Squad Show	Ronan the Accuser	Voice, 2 episodes
2012, 2014	Regular Show	Thomas the Demon	Voice, 2 episodes
2014	Ben 10: Omniverse	Dr. Viktor, I.M. Werfzel	Voice, 2 episodes
2015–2016	Teenage Mutant Ninja Turtles	Captain Mozar, Triceratons	Voice, recurring role
2016	Uncle Grandpa	Crispin Mulcahy	Voice, 4 episodes
2016–2017	Arrow	Prometheus	Voice, recurring role (uncredited)
2017	Supergirl	Prometheus	Voice, episode: "Crisis on Earth-X"; uncredited
2017	Transformers: Titans Return	Fortress Maximus	Voice, web series
2017–2018	Justice League Action	Atrocitus	Voice, 2 episodes
2017–2019	The Lion Guard	Bupu	Voice, recurring role
2018	OK K.O.! Let's Be Heroes	Strike, I.M. Weasel	Voice, episode: "Crossover Nexus"
2021–present	Invincible	Thokk / Battle Beast, Viltrumites	Voice, 4 episodes
2021–2022	Dogs in Space	Pistachio Soup	Voice, 7 episodes
2022	Dota: Dragon's Blood	Asar	Voice, 8 episodes
2023	Star Trek: Picard	Captain Worf	Season 3
2023	The Santa Clauses	Sandman	
2025–present	Armorsaurs	Karter Klay	Voice, main role
2026	Teen Titans Go!	The Monitor	Voice, episode "Use It Or Lose It"
2026	X-Men '97	Baal	Voice, episode "Rise of Apocalypse Part 1"

=== Video games ===
Year	Title	Role	Notes
1993	Gabriel Knight: Sins of the Fathers	Dr. John	
1993	Stellar 7: Draxon's Revenge	Narrator	
1995	Mission Critical	Captain Stephen R. Dayna	
1995	Star Trek: The Next Generation – A Final Unity	Lieutenant Worf	
1996	Vikings: The Strategy of Ultimate Conquest	Narrator	
1997	Star Trek Generations	Lt. Commander Worf	
1998	Fallout 2	Marcus, Frank Horrigan	
2000	Star Trek: Armada	Ambassador Worf	
2000	Star Trek: Klingon Academy	Thok Mak	
2000	Star Trek: Deep Space Nine: The Fallen	Lt. Commander Worf	
2000	Star Trek: Invasion	Lt. Commander Worf	
2001	Emperor: Battle for Dune	Duke Achillus	
2006	Star Trek: Legacy	Worf	
2006	Cartoon Network Racing	I.M. Weasel	
2008	Saints Row 2	Maero	
2008	Lego Indiana Jones: The Original Adventures	Kazim	
2010	Mass Effect 2	Gatatog Uvenk	
2010	Fallout: New Vegas	Marcus	
2010	StarCraft II: Wings of Liberty	Tassadar	
2013	Saints Row IV	Maero	
2013	Star Trek Online	Ambassador Worf	
2015	Infinite Crisis	Swamp Thing	
2015	Code Name: S.T.E.A.M.	John Henry	
2016	Master of Orion: Conquer the Stars	Narrator	
2017	XCOM 2: War of the Chosen	Pratal Mox	
2018	Lego DC Super-Villains	Kalibak	
2019	Indivisible	Ravannavar	
2026	Invincible VS	Thokk / Battle Beast	

=== Web series ===
Year	Title	Role	Notes
2010	Mata Nui Saga	Mata Nui	Voice
2014	Star Trek Continues	Computer Voice	Voice, episode: "Fairest of Them All"
2015	Con Man	Himself	Episode: "Thank Your for Your Service"
2017	Bravest Warriors	Armada Pilot	Voice, episode: "Dan of Future Past"
2017	Transformers: Titans Return	Fortress Maximus	Voice, episode: "Aftermath and Rebirth"

== Awards and honors ==
- 2024 – Saturn Awards – Lifetime Achievement Award – The Cast of Star Trek: The Next Generation (Note: "The Lifetime Achievement Award is usually presented to an individual for their contributions to genre entertainment. Top luminaries like Stan Lee and Leonard Nimoy, Mr. Spock himself, have received this top honor. It's not new, but we extended this award to cover the entire cast of Star Trek: The Next Generation, due to its continued influence on the face of general television. It was originally doomed to failure since it was following in the footsteps of the original Star Trek, yet it carved its own identity, and its diverse cast was light years ahead of its time!" —Academy of Science Fiction, Fantasy and Horror Films)
