= Star Trek: Armada II =

2001 video game

- North American boxart
- Developer: Mad Doc Software
- Publisher: Activision
- Director: Ian Lane Davis
- Producer: Ken Davis
- Designers: Steve Nadeau; Brian Mysliwy; Michael Ryan
- Composer: Danny Pelfrey
- Engine: Storm3D
- Platform: Windows
- Release: NA: November 19, 2001; EU: December 1, 2001
- Genre: Real-time strategy
- Modes: Single-player, multiplayer

Star Trek: Armada II is a real-time strategy video game published by Activision in 2001, based upon the Star Trek universe. The game was developed by Mad Doc Software. It is the sequel to Star Trek: Armada. Star Trek: Armada II was released by Activision a year after they acquired the full rights to all the franchise holding of the video game's franchise from Viacom. It was the first of the three major Star Trek video game sequel titles that were released by Activision from 2001 until their departure from the franchise in 2003. On December 13, 2021, both Armada and Armada II were re-released on GoG.com, which had also released several other older Star Trek titles earlier that year.

Like its predecessor, Armada II is set in the Star Trek: The Next Generation era of the Star Trek universe. The game showcases events in the Alpha Quadrant between the United Federation of Planets, the Klingon Empire, the Romulan Star Empire, the Cardassian Union, Species 8472, and the Borg.

== Plot ==
Set just six months after the events of Star Trek: Armada, the Borg once again threaten the Alpha Quadrant. They have created a new ship capable of assimilating entire worlds in just a few seconds. After routing the attempted foothold, Captain Picard discovers a new type of nebula: a tachyon nebula. Intrigued, Picard discovers a new type of transwarp gate called a Transwarp Portal, capable of sending fleets of starships from one quadrant to another almost instantly, explaining how the Borg managed to get so deep into the Alpha Quadrant undetected. Starfleet Command then orders Picard to seize control of it and launch a counteroffensive into the heart of Borg space in the Delta Quadrant, into the Borg staging grounds. Though successful, some of the Federation forces, Picard included, are left stranded when the Transwarp Portal collapses due to a destabilization of the inter-spatial transwarp manifolds.

Meanwhile, the Cardassians use the sudden absence of Federation forces to begin their own offensive. The Cardassians proceed to destroy the Federation's reserve fleet. Klingon Chancellor Martok discovers that Gul Kentar, leader of the Cardassian uprising, is in league with the Romulans. Kentar is developing a "Quantum Singularity Ship" that allows the Cardassians to summon Species 8472 ships at will. Martok leads an attempt to thwart Kentar's grab for power and destroy the project. The Klingons stop the Cardassian rebellion and occupy their homeworld, Cardassia Prime. In the final battle, Martok tracks down and kills Gul Kentar, taking out the Quantum Singularity Project along the way.

The Borg Queen, stranded in the Alpha Quadrant by the same twist of fate that trapped Picard on her side of the galaxy, discovers that Species 8472 has found a way into the Alpha Quadrant. She attempts to mass an armada to suppress this threat by assimilating native species planets, ships and technologies, but its growth is stunted by the constant attacks from the Federation. She then realizes that only by working with the Federation they can defeat Species 8472. The Federation and the Borg Collective create an alliance and venture into Species 8472's fluidic space to destroy their staging grounds by destroying the Rift Maker, thus ending the threat to the Alpha Quadrant by closing all the rifts.

== Reception ==
Reception

Aggregate score
Aggregator	Score
Metacritic	65/100

Review scores
Publication	Score
AllGame	3.5/5
Computer Games Magazine	2.5/5
Computer Gaming World	2.5/5
GameSpot	7.1/10
GameSpy	80%
GameZone	8/10
IGN	7.4/10
PC Gamer (UK)	60%
PC Gamer (US)	69%
PC Zone	52%

The game received more "mixed" reviews than the original Star Trek: Armada, according to the review aggregation website Metacritic.
