= Star Trek: Armada =

2000 video game

- Developer: Activision
- Publisher: Activision
- Directors: Trey Watkins; Ian Lane Davis
- Producer: Marc Turndorf
- Designer: Eric Gewirtz
- Programmers: Ian Lane Davis; Steve Williams; Brian Hawkins; Gordon Moyes; Martin C. Martin; Linus Chen; Dale Son
- Artist: David Dalzell
- Composers: Danny Pelfrey; Danny Baker
- Engine: Storm3D
- Platform: Windows
- Release: NA: March 27, 2000; EU: April 1, 2000
- Genre: Real-time strategy
- Modes: Single-player, multiplayer

Star Trek: Armada is a real-time strategy video game for Microsoft Windows developed and published in 2000 by Activision. The game's look and feel is based primarily on Star Trek: The Next Generation, and features a few of its main characters and ships. Playable factions include the United Federation of Planets, the Klingon Empire, the Romulan Star Empire and the Borg. The game received mixed to positive reviews and was noted for being one of the better Star Trek games to be made. A sequel, Star Trek: Armada II, was released on November 16, 2001.

In a cross-promotion with the Star Trek Customizable Card Game, an initial run of Armada boxes contained an exclusive playable card, the USS Jupiter.

On December 13, 2021, Armada and its sequel were re-released on GoG.com, which had previously released several other older Star Trek titles earlier that year.

== Gameplay ==
Armada is a real-time strategy game in which players select a faction from the Star Trek universe and build fleets of starships and space station bases to conduct battle. Four playable factions are featured in the game: the Federation, the Klingons, the Romulans, and the Borg. A handful of ships from other Star Trek races appear in campaign missions, including Ferengi, Cardassians, Dominion, and Breen. Each faction fields six different classes of starship ranging from scout to capital ship, which also possesses a unique tactical ability. In addition to weapons and shields, players can capture one another's ships and stations. Two primary resources are used in the game: crew and dilithium. Crew is automatically generated over time via starbases. Dilithium is mined from moons by resource gatherers.

The game features a continuous campaign of 20 missions divided into five parts: one for each of the playable races and a fifth part in which the player fights against the Borg while controlling an alliance of the other three races. The game's multiplayer mode allows for skirmish battles with the computer or other players. Individual games are played out on a representative scale that is roughly equivalent to a planetary system. The player may encounter a variety of celestial bodies such as planetoids, asteroids, and nebulae, each having an effect on gameplay.

== Plot ==
The storyline references several media in the Star Trek universe, incorporating plot elements from television shows Star Trek: Deep Space Nine and Star Trek: The Next Generation as well as the then-recently released film Star Trek: Insurrection.

Following the Dominion War, the Federation turns to rebuilding. However, a Federation timeship, the USS Premonition, suddenly appears from the future, under attack by the Borg. Captain Jean-Luc Picard, commanding the USS Enterprise-E, comes to its aid. The Premonition's captain, Thaddeus Demming, warns Picard of an upcoming Borg invasion. Picard then repels an initial Borg attack on a Federation outpost.

Elsewhere, Commander Worf assists in the defense of the Ba'ku homeworld from the Son'a, after which he is informed of the Enterprise's discovery. While traveling through a hazardous sector of space on his way back to Qo'nos, he is ambushed by his old enemy, Toral, who plans to use a fake Sword of Kahless to take over the Klingon Empire. Toral ambushes Chancellor Martok following another Borg incursion, and another Klingon civil war ensues. After a climactic battle over the Klingon homeworld, Toral is defeated. He retreats to the Neutral Zone, revealing that he was getting assistance from the Romulan Star Empire. Hostilities ensue between the Klingons and the Romulans.

The Romulans, in the meantime, come across a stable Omega Particle, a source of nearly limitless power. The particle, discovered first by a Ferengi mining guild, is about to be sold to the Cardassians; the Tal Shiar sends Admiral Sela to secure it before that happens. Sela captures the Omega Particle and, despite some Borg interference, delivers it to a fortified Romulan base. She then allies with the Borg promising the particle after they destroy Toral's remaining forces, but she then betrays and attacks them after Toral is defeated.

The Borg, wanting to secure the particle at all costs, assimilate a Dominion cloning facility and use it to clone Locutus, the former title of Jean-Luc Picard when he was assimilated. With Locutus leading their armada, the Borg take the Omega Particle from the Romulans and assimilate Ambassador Spock, who is trying to mediate between the Klingons and Romulans. Without him, the two empires go to war, and the Borg are able to enter the Solar System. Locutus and his armada defeat the Federation fleet, kill Worf and Demming, and assimilate Earth. However, Picard and the Enterprise manage to escape through a temporal vortex created by the Premonition.

Going back in time, the Enterprise prevents Spock's assimilation. Picard and Spock are able to forge an alliance among the Romulans and the Klingons, and together the three governments repel the invasion of Earth. The unified Klingon, Romulan and Federation forces push the Borg out of the Alpha Quadrant and capture a Transwarp Gate which they take to Unimatrix One, at the heart of the Borg Collective. There, they discover the Omega Particle is fueling the Borg war machine. The combined force destroys the Omega Particle, but Locutus travels back in time before he can be defeated.

Back in time, Locutus, in a Borg Sphere, tries to kill Picard aboard the USS Enterprise-D shortly after the Farpoint mission. However, Locutus is thwarted by the USS Premonition which, unaffected by the changes to the timeline, pursues Locutus back in time and destroys his ship. When a battle-weary Premonition returns to the "present" and witnesses that all has returned to normal, Demming sends the ship and crew home to a brighter future. The game ends with a final log entry from Picard, noting the departure of the Premonition, as well as the potential disintegration of the Klingon-Romulan alliance, though Picard notes that 'whether the peace will last or not, only time will tell'.

== Development ==
=== Cast ===
Several voice actors from the series contributed to their characters in the game. Patrick Stewart reprised the roles of Jean-Luc Picard and Locutus, Michael Dorn voiced Worf, Denise Crosby reprised Sela and J. G. Hertzler voiced Chancellor Martok. Several other voice actors who had been previously unaffiliated with Star Trek also voiced characters in the game, among them was Richard Penn.

== Reception ==
Reception

Aggregate score
Aggregator	Score
GameRankings	71%

Review scores
Publication	Score
CNET Gamecenter	7/10
Computer Games Strategy Plus	2.5/5
Computer Gaming World	2/5
Eurogamer	7/10
Game Informer	8.25/10
GameFan	85%
GamePro	2.5/5
GameRevolution	B
GameSpot	7.9/10
GameSpy	73%
IGN	6/10
Next Generation	4/5
PC Accelerator	7/10
PC Gamer (US)	69%

The game received "average" reviews according to the review aggregation website GameRankings.

Greg Kasavin of GameSpot praised the game for its graphics, which accurately replicated the ships from The Next Generation. He also noted the slight twists in resource and unit mechanics, but concluded that the game was more or less a standard RTS. Mark Asher of IGN criticized a formulaic approach that failed to distinguish the game from other RTS titles. He also considered the single-player game to be boring. Both GameSpot and IGN noted several bugs causing video and sound problems, as well as alt-tabbing causing the game to crash. Greg Orlando of NextGen said, "The prime directive compels you to buy this game, even if you think that bald-headed freak Jean-Luc Picard was the best Enterprise captain ever."

Nick Woods of AllGame gave it four stars out of five, saying, "In summary, Star Trek: Armada is a game that keeps your pulse moving and your mind working as well." John Brandon of GameZone gave it eight out of ten, calling it "an excellent RTS game that's to play. 3D graphics help immerse you into the Star Trek universe, and scripted missions give everything an arcade feel. Never too innovative, the game still ranks as one of the better offerings in the RTS genre."

In 2016, Tom's Guide ranked the game as one of the top ten Star Trek games. Four years later, Screen Rant ranked it as the 9th best Star Trek game and praised Patrick Stewart voicing Captain Picard in the game.
