= Enab =

Emanab امناب
- Village
- Location within Iran
- Coordinates: 37°53′22″N 46°40′51″E
- Country: Iran
- Province: East Azerbaijan
- County: Bostanabad
- Bakhsh: Central
- Rural District: Qurigol

Population (2006)
  - Total: 438
- Time zone: UTC+3:30 (IRST)
  - Summer (DST): UTC+4:30 (IRDT)

Emanab (Persian: امناب, also Romanized as Eʿnāb; also known as Eman Āb-e Qadīm, Eman Āb, and Īmanāb-e Qadīm) is a village in Qurigol Rural District, in the Central District of Bostanabad County, East Azerbaijan Province, Iran. At the 2006 census, its population was 438, in 77 families.
