= Star Trek: Legacy =

Video game based on the Star Trek series

- Developer: Mad Doc Software
- Publisher: Bethesda Softworks
- Composer: Jason Graves
- Platforms: Microsoft Windows, Xbox 360
- Release: Windows: NA: December 5, 2006; AU: December 14, 2006; EU: December 22, 2006; Xbox 360: NA: December 15, 2006; AU: December 15, 2006; EU: December 22, 2006
- Genres: Real-time tactics, action-adventure, space combat
- Modes: Single-player, multiplayer

Star Trek: Legacy is a 2006 real-time tactics space combat video game for Microsoft Windows and Xbox 360 developed by Mad Doc Software and published by Bethesda Softworks in association with CBS Paramount Television and CBS Consumer Products. Players control a fleet of various Federation starships (up to four) through four different Star Trek eras in combat.

Originally slated for release in the fall of 2006 to coincide with the 40th anniversary of Star Trek, the Windows version was not released in North America until December 5, 2006, and the Xbox 360 version until December 15. In Europe, both the PC version and the Xbox 360 version were released on December 22, 2006.

The game represents the first time that the five actors who portrayed each of the captains in the five individual Star Trek shows up until that time, William Shatner, Patrick Stewart, Avery Brooks, Kate Mulgrew, and Scott Bakula had participated in the same project. The PC version of the game was met with mainly negative reviews, whilst the Xbox 360 version fared slightly better with critics.

== Gameplay ==
Players control a squadron of one to four 3D modeled starships, and engage in battles against other starships. Starship movement is controlled with pitch, yaw, and forward propulsion (as well as a straight-line "warp" capability for rapid movement across a map). Movement occurs in a fully 3D "pizza box" shaped environment. The player operates a single starship at a time, controlling weapons fire, movement and repairs, and can switch between each of the starships in their squadron. Players also have the ability to change from a 3D display to a top-down 2D tactical display where they can issue specific commands to ships within a task force; for example, the player is able to order a ship to warp to a specific point on the map.

Gameplay in Star Trek: Legacy: the Intrepid-class USS Voyager is engaging a Borg Cube

Viewpoint is controlled in several ways, with players able to "lock" onto an opponent to ensure that the opponent is always centered in the screen, to look straight forward, or to rotate camera around the selected ship. Starships are classified according to weapons strength and maneuverability, and assigned a set number of points that roughly corresponds to the strength of the ship. The player earns "command points" during each mission, and can select new ships to add to their squadron by spending these points between missions.

In addition to the linear campaign, there is a customizable skirmish mode. Players select the map on which to play, the number of ships per squadron, the number of command points allowed, the race and allegiance of each AI player, and the make-up of their own squadron. In skirmish mode, players are not limited to controlling Starfleet vessels as they are in the campaign; they can control the ships of the different races faced in the campaign, namely the Borg, the Klingons, the Romulans, the Dominion, as well as other assorted factions and ship types. A mode of play included in later versions of the game is the "coop wave" mode, in which a player (with up to 6 other "squadrons/fleets") guards a station from assault by increasingly harder-to-defeat enemy fleets, increasing in gradual waves. Bethesda has also released a mission editor tool allowing users to freely customize missions.

The PC version of the game has several modification tools. One such mod is the "Ultimate Universe Mod", which allows players to utilize a mass armada (with both sides' ships chosen out of a list of 450+ starships across all races), or battle with pre-determined ships for both sides. Ultimate Universe adds a new mode called "Historical Battles", in which players may fight famous battles from the Star Trek series, from multiple points of view.

== Storyline ==
The single-player campaign spans the three eras of Star Trek: Enterprise (ENT), The Original Series (TOS) and The Next Generation (TNG). The Original Series era also includes elements from the Original Series films. The Next Generation era includes elements from Deep Space Nine (DS9), Voyager, (VOY) and the Next Generation films. In each era, the player utilizes a fleet of Federation ships from that era to combat the Romulans (ENT), Klingons (TOS), and Borg (TNG).

The eras covered in single-player, with the corresponding captains and main ships, are:

- Jonathan Archer (Enterprise (NX-01) - ENT)
- James T. Kirk
  - (USS Enterprise - TOS, The Motion Picture, The Wrath of Khan and The Search for Spock)
  - (USS Enterprise-A - The Voyage Home, The Final Frontier and The Undiscovered Country)
- Jean-Luc Picard
  - (USS Stargazer - TNG)
  - (USS Enterprise-D - TNG and Generations)
  - (USS Enterprise-E - First Contact, Insurrection and Nemesis)
- Benjamin Sisko (USS Defiant - DS9)
- Kathryn Janeway (USS Voyager - VOY)

=== Enterprise Era ===
The story begins in 2159, approximately four years after the events of "Demons" and "Terra Prime" and two years before the decommissioning of Enterprise (NX-01) in 2161 (see "These Are the Voyages...") as Captain Jonathan Archer (voiced by Scott Bakula) is sent to search for a missing Vulcan science ship in a nearby star system. Enterprise arrives but is immediately attacked by Romulans. After fighting off the Romulans, Enterprise finds the Vulcan ship under attack from another group of Romulans. After saving the ship, the Seleya, their captain, Commander T'Uerell (Bari Biern), asks Enterprise to accompany her to her research station, Gravenor, which, she fears, may also be under attack. Upon reaching the station, T'Uerell's fears are proven correct, as Romulans are attacking the station. T'Uerell docks to evacuate her people while Enterprise holds off the incoming Romulans. However, T'Uerell breaks off radio contact and disembarks from the station seconds before the Gravenor explodes, with a full crew complement still on board. As T'Uerell departs, she thanks Archer for defending her whilst she recovered her protomatter from the station. She flees, and the badly damaged Enterprise is forced to return to Earth.

Some time later, Enterprise is ordered to escort three medical ships through a system where a viral epidemic has broken out. Several times the Romulans attack, but each time, they are repulsed. The medical ships are able to deliver the antidote, and the epidemic is cured. However, it is confirmed that the virus was artificially created and released into the planets' ecosystem on purpose. Enterprise is sent to discover where the virus came from. After identifying the design of a vessel seen navigating through the system just prior to the outbreak, Enterprise proceeds to a nearby planet. Upon arrival, however, they find the virus has been released on the planet, and all life has been wiped out. They search through the system, finding several ships harvesting the virus from gas giants and several harvesting stations orbiting nearby planets in preparation to release the virus into the atmosphere. They destroy the stations, but one harvesting ship is able to escape with a sample of the virus.

Enterprise then learns that the Romulans are mounting a large-scale attack near Earth, and they arrive just in time to prevent the destruction of a starbase. They learn that the ship with the virus has had its contents distributed to three smaller ships, and these three ships are now being escorted towards Earth by the Romulan fleet. Using nearby mining facilities, which still use nuclear fusion, Enterprise is able to disable the engines of the three ships, which the starbase subsequently destroys. With this, the remaining Romulan ships disengage and Earth is saved.

=== Original Series Era ===
The game then cuts to 2270, the era of the original Constitution-class USS Enterprise (NCC-1701) under the command of James T. Kirk (William Shatner). It is the height of a war with the Klingon Empire, and Starfleet Intelligence has uncovered the development of an advanced Klingon weapons platform. Kirk is tasked with stealing an experimental Klingon Bird-of-Prey which has been fitted with a prototype cloaking device. After successfully doing so, Kirk pilots the vessel to the weapon platform. While under cloak, Kirk sees the Seleya at a mining facility, and listens in on a conversation that reveals T'Uerell designed the weapons platform in exchange for mineral deposits. With this information in hand, Kirk recommends that Starfleet conduct an immediate strike on the platform. Kirk is assigned a task force and destroys the weapons platform, where he again encounters T'Uerell, who warps out of the system.

Twenty years later, T'Uerell appears at a classified Federation research station. Now in command of the new Constitution-class USS Enterprise (NCC-1701-A), Admiral Kirk avoids going into retirement so as to deal with the matter. Kirk is able to regain control of the station after a skirmish with some Klingon vessels. Upon beaming an away team aboard, they report the presence of mysterious cybernetic implants in what used to be the Klingons aboard the station. Kirk confronts T'Uerell, who again flees, leaving behind a large Borg sphere and three mysterious orbs. By destroying the three smaller spheres, Kirk is able to destroy the main sphere. However, upon the sphere's destruction, a massive explosion destroys subspace for a three light-year radius. As he contemplates his failure to capture T'Uerell, Kirk states, "Hopefully the next generation will do better."

=== Next Generation Era ===
The game then cuts to 2333 as the USS Stargazer monitors several Romulan vessels engaged in combat with T'Uerell in a nearby star system. The Romulans are destroyed when T'Uerell uses a super-weapon on a planet in the system, instantly liquefying it to molten rock and destabilizing its core. The shockwave from the weapon damages the Stargazer, fatally wounding Captain Ruhalter (David Bryan Jackson) and advancing the young Jean-Luc Picard (Patrick Stewart) to acting captain. The Stargazer and several other Starfleet vessels successfully destroy most of the stellar debris emanating from the liquefied planet so as to prevent collisions with several inhabited planets nearby.

The game then moves to 2368 as Commander Benjamin Sisko (Avery Brooks), having recently been assigned command of the experimental USS Defiant, takes his ship to the Itari system to test it out. En route, he encounters a mysterious phenomenon which prevents warp, along with several Romulan Warbirds. They intend to apprehend a dangerous fugitive allegedly responsible for the deaths of many Romulans. Sisko confronts the Romulans over their illegal presence in Federation space and is taken prisoner. Captain Jean-Luc Picard, now in command of the Galaxy-class USS Enterprise (NCC-1701-D), is sent to the system to locate and recover the Defiant and her crew. After learning of the presence of warp inhibitors in the system, the Enterprise destroys them and Picard's team assaults a Romulan starbase in the area, saving the Defiant.

The game then advances to 2380, following the end of the Dominion War (see "What You Leave Behind"), the return of the USS Voyager from the Delta Quadrant (see "Endgame"), and the collapse of the Romulan Empire (see Star Trek: Nemesis). Captain Picard and the Sovereign-class USS Enterprise (NCC-1701-E), along with Admiral Janeway (Kate Mulgrew) aboard the USS Voyager, are engaged in discussions with T'Uerell, who is escorted by several powerful Borg vessels. She reveals that she has assumed the role of the Borg Queen, having reformed the Collective into a tool of total logic in pursuit of her goals to eliminate all that is illogical in the galaxy. When Starfleet refuse to surrender, T'Uerell has the Borg begin to assimilate civilians on nearby planets. However, Picard and Janeway are able to co-ordinate a mass evacuation of the system.

Meanwhile, several Romulan and Klingon fleets draw out T'Uerell's forces and lure it to the more defendable Deep Space 9 space station. The combined Federation, Klingon and Romulan fleets, assisted by Deep Space 9, then confront T'Uerell and her Borg forces. However, T'Uerell flees moments before her vessel can be destroyed. In another system, T'Uerell harnesses polaric ion energy from a nebula to provide a massive boost to her shields. She then opens a transwarp conduit from the Delta Quadrant to bring in Borg reinforcements. With the battle raging, Picard devises a plan to disrupt the conduit by towing two sensor platforms modified to emit a magneton pulse to positions above and below T'Uerell's vessel. This pulse destabilizes the polaric ion energy string, disabling T'Uerell's ability to harness its energy for her shields and the conduit. With the transwarp conduit closed and her shields weakened, T'Uerell is finally defeated by the combined fleets of the Federation, Klingons and Romulans.

== Development ==
Development of the game started as early as 2002.

== Reception ==
Reception

Aggregate scores
Aggregator	Score	
Aggregator	PC	Xbox 360
GameRankings	57.14%	65.20%
Metacritic	56/100	64/100

Review scores
Publication	Score	
Publication	PC	Xbox 360
1Up.com		C+
Eurogamer		4/10
Game Informer		7.75/10
GameRevolution	C	
GameSpot	5.8/10	7.2/10
GameSpy	2/5	2.5/5
IGN	5.9/10	7/10
Official Xbox Magazine (UK)		5/10
Official Xbox Magazine (US)		8/10
PC Gamer (UK)	50/100	
PC Gamer (US)	63/100	
PC Zone	52/100	

The game received mixed to negative reviews. The PC version holds an aggregate score of 57.14% on GameRankings, based on twenty-two reviews, and 56 out of 100 on Metacritic, based on twenty-five reviews. The Xbox 360 version got slightly better reviews and holds a score of 65.20% on GameRankings, based on forty-two reviews, and 64 out of 100 on Metacritic, based on forty-one reviews.

In 2016, Den of Geek ranked Star Trek: Legacy as one of the five worst Star Trek games. In 2020, Screen Rant ranked Legacy as the tenth best Star Trek game.

=== PC ===
Critical response to the PC version of the game was mainly negative, with many reviewers unsatisfied with the control system, only one camera setting that cannot zoom in or out, the inability to save more than one campaign at a time, the inability to save within a mission, a buggy and slow multiplayer mode, the inability to set the exact make-up of AI fleets in skirmish mode, a 3D universe without a z-axis, the inability to change the control scheme, and AI allies that will not automatically assign repairs.

Although graphics were touted as a major selling point by Bethesda, glitches included the cursor disappearing at random intervals during attempts to re-allocate energy and initiate repairs, choppy shadow images, and damage model errors. Reviewers also felt there were camera problems, and criticized the fact that the player cannot choose captains. This feature was advertised on the game's home page as late as a week before release, which claimed that "Victories earn Command Points, which are used to personalize your fleet, ships, and captains." Captains are instead assigned at random, as are ship names in non-campaign mode.

Reviewers found the control problems especially galling, as there was considerable hype by the developers saying "Star Trek Legacy would be an epic game with easy to use controls." Nearly all reviews criticized the controls; IGN's Steve Butts called them "the first and most frequently occurring aggravation," GameSpy's Allen Rausch referred to them as "simply atrocious", while Action Trip's Uros Pavlovic said "one of the most annoying aspects of the PC version of Star Trek Legacy [is that] it suffers a great deal from unresponsive and unintuitive controls." GameSpot's Jason Ocampo noted that "what will make you pound your head in frustration are the controls, which are a nightmare to learn."

As the simulated environment is a 3D "pizza box" shape, the game creates the illusion that ships "stall" as they go too high. Ships also cannot traverse the edge of a map. Reviewers complained about the inability of ships to crash into in-game objects. GameSpot's Ocampo referred to the game's "bumper-car physics, saying that "If a starship runs into anything, such as another vessel, an asteroid, or even a ridiculously out-of-scale planet, it just rubs against it and then moves on." IGN's Butts noted that "objects that collide simply repel each other, sometimes sending each other off in oblique directions, sometimes autopiloting to a new heading, and sometimes simply warping to a new facing altogether." Indeed, although Bethesda's website claims that Legacy features "fully realized nebulas, wormholes, planets, and stars," reviewers complained that the "pint-size planets" are almost the same size as the ships. Action Trip's Pavlovic said that "another mystifying fact about Star Trek Legacy [...] is the painful lack of more solid collision detection. Seeing the Enterprise bounce off a nearby planet like it was made of rubber [...] killed the ambiance."

Jason Ocampo of GameSpot scored the game 5.8 out of 10, writing "This starship combat game simply can't overcome bad controls, frustrating mission designs, and a mess of bugs." He called multiplayer mode "a mess. Trying to join a server is an exercise in frustration, as connecting is mostly impossible and even making the attempt often results in the game crashing." He was also critical of the graphics and the AI, concluding that "Legacy could have been a good game if it wasn't so rushed out in such an unfinished state. The combat can be very cool at times, but the game does everything possible to undermine any goodwill that it generates."

IGN's Steve Butts scored it 5.9 out of 10. He was highly critical of the controls, the absence of any kind of hard collisions, the AI, the graphics and what he perceived as inaccuracies in the instruction manual. He concluded that "The PC version of Star Trek: Legacy is among the most disappointing games of the year. Putting aside any expectations you might have with regard to the Star Trek license or any past associations with games like Starfleet Command, Klingon Academy or Bridge Commander, Star Trek: Legacy simply cannot stand on its own as an entertaining or satisfying experience. The poor control scheme and unreliable AI combine with overly long missions and the absence of a save system to make the game one long exercise in frustration."

Game Revolution's Greg Damiano scored it a C, writing "Bethseda's biggest Trek game of the year is a great presentation, but the experience stalls pretty badly as the fancy lights and sounds give out under weak missions and writing." He praised the graphics and voice acting, but criticized the story, the absence of any tactical element to the gameplay, the repetitive nature of tasks within each mission and the number of bugs in the initial release version, concluding "Legacy looks great and sounds great, it has a few good hooks and a solid story to tell, but it fails on most levels to be a compelling experience."

GameSpy's Allen Rausch scored it 2 out of 5. He praised some of the graphical elements and parts of the storyline, but was critical of edits to the plot; "Missions that were cut prior to release ended up bowdlerizing the story, resulting in strange jumps in the narrative, plot twists that come out of nowhere, a strange lack of motivation for some of the actions that take place and a general unsatisfactory feeling to the single-player campaign." He was also critical of the core gameplay and the repetitive nature of the missions. He concluded" "Star Trek: Legacy reeks of missed opportunities and features cut to make a ship date. In any ordinary game, that would be sad enough. For this to be done to Star Trek: Legacy is almost criminal. This was supposed to be the 40th Anniversary game, the one that fans had been waiting for through all the years of dreck like Star Trek: Shattered Universe. Well, keep those hailing frequencies open. That great Trek game has got to be out there, and Star Trek: Legacy surely isn't it."

=== Xbox 360 ===
Responses to the Xbox 360 version were slightly more positive than to the PC version. Reviewers felt that the 360 version did not contain some of the perceived control difficulties of the PC version, which had resulted from mapping the Xbox Controller onto a keyboard. Also absent were the issues with game compatibility encountered by some users of the PC version.

GameSpot's Jason Ocampo scored the game 7.2 out of 10, writing "Star Trek: Legacy for the Xbox 360 captures the grandeur and feel of the epic starship battles in the famous television series." Directly comparing the PC version with the Xbox version, he wrote "The Xbox 360 version is similar in many ways to the PC version, but the big difference is that while the PC version is plagued with bugs and broken features, the Xbox 360 version works fine. And the control scheme that was awkward with the PC's keyboard and mouse is natural when used with the Xbox 360 controller. The result is a good starship combat game that feels right at home on the Xbox 360." Game Informer gave it 7.75 out of 10, saying Legacy is "a great direction to take the Star Trek gaming franchise."

The Official Xbox Magazine (US) gave the game 8 out of 10, calling it the "best space combat in ages." Game Chronicles' Mark Smith gave it 9.1 out of 10, writing "the command interface is incredibly intuitive, which totally surprised me. I was expecting some massively complicated command structure (like in Lord of the Rings), but it only takes one mission (the tutorial) to catch on."

Not all reviewers of the Xbox version were impressed, however. John Davison of 1UP.com rated the game C+, and was heavily critical of the graphics, the AI and the online multiplayer mode. He wrote that "Offering neither the visceral thrills required to make it an adequate starship shooter, or the more cerebral tactical chops necessary to push it into Homeworld territory, Legacy is left desperately clinging to the one thing it offers in abundance: fanboy service." IGN's Steve Butts scored the game 7 out of 10. He felt the controls worked much better in the Xbox version than the PC version, and he praised the alteration in how objects interacted with one another; "There are no collisions at all in the game. Whether you're steering into the pint-sized planets or enemy space stations, there's an invisible barrier that prevents you from crashing into each other. Where the PC version sometimes teleported you off into new headings, the 360 version handles things a bit more gracefully. Here when you steer into an object, the game simply shifts your heading away from it." However, he still criticized the gameplay mechanics, the AI, the graphics and the storyline. He concluded that "The Xbox 360 version of Star Trek: Legacy has managed to erase some (but not a lot) of the disappointment of the PC version [...] The console controls are much better, which makes Legacy a better proposition on the 360. Still, the overly long missions and the lack of save points make it hard to really embrace the game."

GameSpy's Gerald Villoria scored the game 2.5 out 5. He praised the graphics, the voice acting and the storyline, but felt the overall game was disappointing; "The game simply doesn't satisfy for those looking for a truly compelling gameplay experience, falling short of bringing the vision and feel of Star Trek to the interactive medium." He was heavily critical of the combat mechanics and argued that the game felt incomplete; "There was great potential with Star Trek: Legacy, and the foundation has been laid for a truly stellar game. But the end result feels rushed and that potential still remains untapped."

Eurogamer's Dan Whithead was even more critical, scoring the game 4 out of 10, and writing "combat takes the form of long, drawn-out dogfights between enormous spacecraft that are woefully ill-equipped for such maneuvers." He was also heavily critical of the controls, the AI and the graphics, and concluded that "Unless you already have an emotional attachment to the Star Trek universe, and feel a cheeky little frisson down there at the prospect of pretending to be Kirk, there's no reason at all to put up with the unresponsive controls, shallow gameplay and absolutely infuriating inability to save during an hour-long mission. With the game's appeal thus reduced to those faithful fans still willing to suffer in the name of brand loyalty, it remains an impossible game to recommend without serious caveats."
