= Keiichi Nanba =

Japanese actor (born 1957)

- 難波 圭一
- Born: August 26, 1957 (age 69); Iwakuni, Yamaguchi Prefecture, Japan
- Occupations: Actor; voice actor; narrator
- Years active: 1980–present
- Agent: Fujiga Office Inc.
- Spouses: Hiromi Tsuru (m. 1985–1990) Mayumi Shō (m. 1990)

Keiichi Nanba (難波 圭一, Nanba Keiichi; born on August 26, 1957) is a Japanese actor, voice actor, and narrator under Fujiga Office Inc. He is married to fellow voice actress Mayumi Shō.

== Filmography ==
=== Television animation ===
List of voice performances in television animation
Year	Title	Role	Notes	Source
1981	The Gutsy Frog 2	Additional voice		
1983	Cat's Eye	Police Officer		
1984	Persia, the Magic Fairy	Gaku Muroi		
1985	Alpen Rose	Lundi Cortot		
1985	High School! Kimengumi	Shō Kireide		
1985	Mobile Suit Zeta Gundam	Katz Kobayashi		
1985	Touch	Kazuya Uesugi		
1985	Doraemon	Urashima Tarō, Dora-the-Kid	Urashima Tarō in Ep. 827	
1986	Machine Robo: Revenge of Cronos	Koron		
1987	Hiatari Ryōkō!	Kodama		
1987	Kimagure Orange Road	Seiji Komatsu		
1989	Dragon Ball Z	Zeshin		
1990	Pink: Water Bandit, Rain Bandit	Cobalt Blue		
1991	Ranma ½	Picolet Chardin III		
1992	Sailor Moon	Gurio Umino, Zoisite		
1992	Fatal Fury: Legend of the Hungry Wolf	Andy Bogard		
1993	Fatal Fury 2: The New Battle	Andy Bogard		
2005	Sergeant Keroro	Dogezaemon	Ep. 59	

Unknown date

- Captain Tsubasa (Karl Heinz Schneider)
- DNA² (Junta Momonari)
- Dragon Quest: Dai no Daibōken (Popp, Mystvearn)
- Hokuto no Ken 2 (Adult Bat)
- Fuuma no Kojirou (Kojirou)
- Futari wa Pretty Cure Splash Star (Moerumba)
- Locke the Superman (Locke)
- Mobile Suit Gundam Wing (Alex)
- Ninja Ryūkenden (Ryu Hayabusa)
- One Piece (Shepherd, Itomimizu)
- Saint Seiya (Pisces Aphrodite, Poseidon/Julian Solo, Tateza Jan, Astaroth, Freyr)
- Saint Seiya: Soul of Gold (Pisces Aphrodite)
- Sakigake!! Otokojuku (Hien)
- Sakura Taisen: Katsudō Shashin (Patrick Hamilton)
- Toriko (Joa)
- Transformers (Blaster, Twincast, Leozak, Leocaesar, White Leo)
- Trigun (Hoppered the Gauntlet)
- Violence Jack: Harlem Bomber (Kenichi)

=== Theatrical animation ===
List of voice performances in theatrical animation
Year	Title	Role	Notes	Source
1984	Locke the Superman	Locke		
1985	Captain Tsubasa: Europe Daikessen	Karl Heinz Schneider		
1985	Odin: Photon Sailer Starlight	Hayashi		
1985	Captain Tsubasa: Ayaushi, Zen Nippon Jr.	Karl Heinz Schneider		
1986	Captain Tsubasa: Asu ni Mukatte Hashire	Karl Heinz Schneider		
1986	Touch: The Ace Without a Number on His Back	Kazuya Uesugi		
1986	High School! Kimengumi	Shou Kireide		
1986	Captain Tsubasa: Sekai Daikessen!! Jr. World Cup	Karl Heinz Schneider		
1986	Touch 2: Goodbye Gift	Kazuya Uesugi		
1987	Saint Seiya: The Movie	Scutum Jan		
1987	Bug-tte Honey: Megaromu Shōjo Mai 4622	Rio		
1988	Doraemon: The Record of Nobita's Parallel Visit to the West	Motohira-kun		
1988	Saint Seiya: The Heated Battle of the Gods	Freyr		
1988	Saint Seiya: The Legend of Crimson Youth	Pisces Aphrodite		
1988	Kimagure Orange Road: I Want to Return to That Day	Masashi Komatsu		
1989	Saint Seiya: Warriors of the Final Holy Battle	Cherub Astaroth		
1989	Hengen Taima Yakō Karura Mau! Nara Onryō Emaki	Chikae Ikeda		
1989	Little Nemo: Adventures in Slumberland	Oomp		
1989	Akuma-kun: The Movie	Batcat		
1991	Dragon Ball Z: Lord Slug	Angira		
1994	Fatal Fury: The Motion Picture	Andy Bogard		
1996	Dorami & Doraemons: Robot School's Seven Mysteries!?	Dora-the-Kid	Short film	
1997	The Doraemons: The Puzzling Challenge Letter of the Mysterious Thief Dorapin!	Dora-the-Kid	Short film	
1998	The Doraemons: The Great Operating of Springing Insects!	Dora-the-Kid	Short film	
1999	The Doraemons: Funny Candy of Okashinana!?	Dora-the-Kid	Short film	
2000	The Doraemons: Doki Doki Wildcat Engine!	Dora-the-Kid	Short film	
2001	Doraemon: Nobita and the Winged Braves	Ostrich Taxi		
2001	Dorami & Doraemons: Space Land's Critical Event!	Dora-the-Kid	Short film	
2001	Sakura Wars: The Movie	Patrick Hamilton		

=== Video games ===
List of voice performances in video games
Year	Title	Role	Notes	Source
1995	Fatal Fury 3: Road to the Final Victory	Andy Bogard		
1995	The King of Fighters '95	Andy Bogard		
1995	Real Bout Fatal Fury	Andy Bogard		
1996	The King of Fighters '96	Andy Bogard		
1997	Real Bout Fatal Fury Special	Andy Bogard		
1997	The King of Fighters '97	Andy Bogard		
1998	Real Bout Fatal Fury 2: The Newcomers	Andy Bogard		
1998	Guilty Gear	Axl Low		
1998	The King of Fighters '98	Andy Bogard		
1998	The King of Fighters: Kyo	Andy Bogard		
1998	D2 Manga Lupin the 3rd	Arséne Lupin III		
1999	Fatal Fury: Wild Ambition	Andy Bogard		
1999	The King of Fighters '99	Andy Bogard		
2000	Guilty Gear X	Axl Low		
2000	The King of Fighters 2000	Andy Bogard		
2001	The King of Fighters 2001	Andy Bogard		
2002	Guilty Gear X2	Axl Low		
2002	The King of Fighters 2002	Andy Bogard		
2009	The King of Fighters XII	Andy Bogard		
2010	The King of Fighters XIII	Andy Bogard		
2014	Guilty Gear Xrd: Sign	Axl Low		
2015	Guilty Gear Xrd: Revelator	Axl Low		
2021	Guilty Gear: Strive	Axl Low		

- Black/Matrix (Juda)

=== Dubbing roles ===
==== Live-action ====
List of dub performances in live-action productions
Title	Role	Notes	Source
Avatar: The Way of Water	Parker Selfridge (Giovanni Ribisi)		
A Better Tomorrow II	Sung Tse-kit (Leslie Cheung)		
