= Hideyuki Anbe =

Japanese video game programmer

- 安部 秀之
- Hideyuki Anbe at Nexon Developers Conference 2018.
- Occupations: Video game programmer; director; designer; producer
- Years active: 1997–present
- Employer: Arc System Works
- Hideyuki Anbe's voice Anbe presenting at Nexon Developers Conference. July 2, 2018.

Hideyuki Anbe (安部 秀之, Anbe Hideyuki), sometimes spelled Hideyuki Ambe, is a Japanese video game programmer, designer, director and producer. He is best known for his work at Arc System Works, such as the lead programmer on the original Guilty Gear, and the director of titles such as Fist of the North Star (2005) and Hard Corps: Uprising. He has been the Chief Technical Officer of the company since 2018.

== Career ==
Anbe began working at Arc System Works during his first year of college. Despite having no prior experience with coding before going to college, he was tasked with being the main programmer for a fighting game that would end up becoming Guilty Gear for the original PlayStation in 1998. He described the process as highly challenging, saying that every day felt like "fumbling around in the dark." Anbe enjoyed 3D fighting games more than 2D ones, and said that Guilty Gear reflected his opinions about common shortcomings he had concerning the genre. Anbe would also end up voicing the character Potemkin in the game due to last minute changes. The game's director and series creator, Daisuke Ishiwatari, would also end up voicing the protagonist, Sol Badguy.

Anbe would continue to work on other fighting and action games, such as Grappler Baki: Baki Saikyō Retsuden (released as Fighting Fury in North America) as a director, and Shinobi as a programmer for characters, enemies and bosses. Anbe would serve as a director and lead programmer for a fighting game adaptation of the manga and anime series, Fist of the North Star, which would release in 2005. Development for the title took about two to three years, according to Anbe, and he was the title's only programmer until the first prototype was completed. Anbe stated that the Atomiswave arcade system that the game used only had half the memory compared to the SEGA Naomi, which previous Arc System Works titles, Guilty Gear X and XX, ran on. To combat the memory limitations, Anbe and his team developed a new compression technology that allowed them to make the animations as fluid as their previous Guilty Gear titles. Anbe stated that the combat was designed to put priority on making offense fun, and put very little emphasis on defense. Anbe stated the game's infamous "basketball" combos, which caused an opponent to be endlessly comboed via repeated bouncing were the result of his inexperience as a programmer.

Anbe would work as a development manager and programmer for several titles through the late 2000s and 2010s, such as Lair Land Story and Hard Corps: Uprising. He would serve as the Development Manager for another fighting game, Granblue Fantasy Versus, which would release in 2018. Anbe would state that Granblue developer, Cygames, was very quick with replying to questions and feedback the team had during the game's development, and that the smoother development allowed the team to make what they believed to be a quality title.

In 2020, Anbe would be promoted to Chief Technical Officer of Arc System Works. He would continue to provide support to a variety of games developed and published by the company such as DNF Duel and Dear me, I was..., and work to promote games such as Guilty Gear Strive and Double Dragon Revive at events such as Brasil Game Show.

== Ludography ==
Game Credits
Year	Game	Role	Ref(s)
1998	Guilty Gear	Lead programmer, voice of Potemkin	
2000	Fighting Fury	Director, programming	
2002	Shinobi	Character/Enemy/Boss programming	
2003	Guilty Gear Isuka	Game Advisor	
2005	Fist of the North Star	General Director, Game Design & Planning, Program Team Director, Main System Program, Character Action Concept	
2008	Sengoku Basara X	Game Designer	
2009	Lair Land Story	Program Director	
2011	Hard Corps: Uprising	Director, Game Design, Level Design, Scenario	
2014	BlazBlue Chrono Phantasma Extend	Player's Guild	
2020	Granblue Fantasy: Versus	Development Manager	
2021	Guilty Gear Strive	Line Producer	
2022	DNF Duel	Chief Producer	
2023	Granblue Fantasy Versus: Rising	Executing Manager	
2024	Umamusume: Pretty Derby – Party Dash	Executive Manager	
2025	Dear me, I was...	Line Producer	
2026	Marvel Tokon: Fighting Souls	Chief Development Officer	
