= Guilty Gear (video game) =

1998 video game

- North American box art
- Developer: Arc System Works
- Publishers: JP: Arc System Works; NA: Atlus USA; UK: Studio 3
- Producer: Daisuke Ishiwatari
- Designer: Daisuke Ishiwatari
- Programmer: Hideyuki Anbe
- Composers: Daisuke Ishiwatari; Takahiro Uematsu; Hatsuaki Takami; Takuya Moritou
- Series: Guilty Gear
- Platforms: PlayStation; Nintendo Switch; PlayStation 4; Windows
- Release: PlayStation: JP: May 14, 1998; NA: November 9, 1998; UK: May 19, 2000; Nintendo Switch, PS4, Windows: WW: May 16, 2019
- Genre: Fighting
- Modes: Single-player, multiplayer

Guilty Gear: The Missing Link is a 1998 fighting game developed and published by Arc System Works for the PlayStation. It is the first installment in the Guilty Gear series. Set in a world destroyed by a war between humans and bio-organic weapons called Gears, it follows ten fighters as they enter a tournament held to prevent the resurrection of the Gears' leader. Its gameplay consists of one-on-one fights, a four-button attack configuration featuring special moves and instant kill techniques, as well as three different playable modes.

Conceptualized by Daisuke Ishiwatari, it spent a year and a half in production, with influences from Capcom's Street Fighter and manga. After its original release, it was brought to both North America, and Europe and the PAL region, and achieved a cult status among fans. It has received favorable critical reception, with praise towards its characters' roster, 2D graphics and fast gameplay that differentiates it from other games of the same genre. It has been labeled as one of few games of its era to cause a lasting impact on the genre, alongside the hegemonic Capcom and SNK games. However, it received criticism due to its difficulty and unbalanced set of characters.

== Gameplay ==
A typical battle in Guilty Gear, featuring Ky Kiske and Testament. The upper bar shows the character's health while the bottom bar is the tension gauge. The red orbs under the health bar display the rounds each player has won.

After selecting one of ten characters available from the outset, the player must defeat the enemy in battle by winning two out of three rounds. It uses a six-button layout: four of which are responsible for the attacks—one punch, one kick, and two for weapon attacks—with the other two used for special actions. Guilty Gear also features instant kill techniques that, if successfully landed on an opponent, ends the match.

It uses a tension gauge, which fills up when the character lands a hit or takes damage. When the gauge is full, characters become stronger, and can input certain commands to activate special moves called Chaos Attacks. The game has a feature called Chaos Mode that is activated when a character's health is at the half-way point (yellow bar). A red aura will surround the character and they are able to perform unlimited Chaos Attacks.

It features three modes: "Arcade Mode", a single-player mode culminating in battles with the bosses and the only one that reveals character's reasoning for fighting; "Versus Mode", which gives the opportunity to play against another player; and "Training Mode", which allows players to practice freely. The game's settings allow the player to select the duration of the round, but do not allow them to change the number of rounds in a fight, nor the difficulty in the single-player mode.

== Controls and Gatling ==
The game involves four attack buttons known as

- P - Punch
- K - Kick
- S - Slash (a move done with a character's "weapon", e.g. Ky's sword, Millia's hair or Zato-1's Eddie)
- HS - Heavy Slash (a powerful but slow move done with a character's "weapon")

There is also a gatling system that allows you to chain attacks into one another. Although gatling options differ for most moves, a basic one is P->K->S->HS.

== Synopsis ==
=== Plot ===
In the year 2000, a calamity known as the Dawn of Revival occurs when all modern technology malfunctions and unexplained natural disasters devastate Earth, leading to a near-collapse. Humanity is then introduced to "Magic", a new, unlimited energy source of power that replaces most technology and stabilizes the crisis. American scientists Asuka R. Kruetz, Frederick Bulsara, and Aria Hale later combine Magic with various creatures to create powerful "Gears" intended to evolve and advance humanity to overcome future calamity, but the project is coopted by the government to produce powerful weapons. Asuka, now "That Man" turns Aria into a new Gear, "Justice" to end the wars, but she is corrupted by the entity which caused the Dawn and leads the Gears in turning on the human race, causing a global war known as the Crusades. After a century, Frederick, under the name Sol Badguy, joins the Sacred Order of Holy Knights and defeats Justice, locking her away in a dimensional prison and causing all Gears to cease functioning.

The story of Guilty Gear takes place in 2180, five years after the end of the Crusades. A Gear named Testament plans to resurrect Justice, whose prison is degrading, and wipe out the human race. Fearing this, the Union of Nations organized a fighting tournament in order to find fighters who would be able to defeat Testament and prevent her revival, awarding the winner with anything they may desire.

Ten combatants sign up to enter "The Second Sacred Order Tournament". As the combatants fight through the stages of the tournament they begin to discover the true goal behind it. Sol defeats Testament in the second to last stage of the tournament. However, he is too late to prevent Justice's resurrection. After an arduous battle, Justice is defeated by Sol, restoring peace for the time being.

=== Characters ===
Guilty Gear features ten playable characters available from the outset. The characters have different styles of fighting, special abilities, and weapons (with some fighting only with their bodies). Aside from the initial ten, the player can unlock three hidden characters to use exclusively in the "Versus Mode". The starting characters are Axl Low, Chipp Zanuff, Dr. Baldhead, Kliff Undersn, Ky Kiske, May, Millia Rage, Potemkin, Sol Badguy (the main character), and Zato-1, while Baiken, Justice, and Testament are boss characters that are unlockable.

== Development and release ==
Guilty Gear creator and director Daisuke Ishiwatari (left) and lead programmer Hideyuki Anbe (right) at Nexon Developers Conference 2018.

The concept for Guilty Gear was conceived by Daisuke Ishiwatari during his period in vocational school. When Ishiwatari joined Arc System Works, he initially worked on other concepts, until revealing to Arc System Works president Minoru Kidooka that he wanted to make a game like Street Fighter. During the planning stage, he was inspired by Street Fighter II, especially by its simplicity and tactics-emphasis, but he abandoned this idea in favor of a "flashy game" after discussing with programmer Hideyuki Anbe. As such, Ishiwatari created Guilty Gear, as he was dissatisfied with other fighting games, focused on creating "cool" characters. Kidooka approved the idea and gave Ishiwatari a team of around 12 developers, nicknamed "Team Neo Blood", to develop the game. Ishiwatari, however, said only four people were doing the main work and that all group had no experience in creating video games. In consequence, it took a year and a half for the game to be completed. With influences of the fantasy setting of the manga Bastard!!, Ishiwatari created the series hoping it would appeal not only to game fans but to anime fans too. For this purpose, Ishiwatari ordered characters' design to an anime company. Originally, the game was designed with rendered 3-D visuals, but this was later replaced by hand-drawn artwork because Ishiwatari disliked the result.

Ishiwatari was convinced that the game "should be something difficult" because he saw fighting games trying and failing to appeal to casual players. Two main aspects prioritized for Guilty Gear were prediction of the opponent's movement and strategy/tactics. He explained his main focus was to create a product that would satisfy its players, and that could "expand the possibilities of the game itself." A different layout of buttons, "one of the things that defined" the game, was necessary because "we wanted to come up with something different to the other games – it needed to be different." For this reason, the instant-kill techniques were added; their function was also to add tension or thrill to the fight as someone who was winning could be defeated suddenly, "something we really wanted to be a strong theme for the game." Ishiwatari also inserted them as a selling strategy and because Guilty Gear would be released as a home console-only video game. It was divisive feature among the staff; in the end, Ishiwatari and Anbe concluded they were an extraneous mechanic, but they did not have time to remove them before release.

Guilty Gear took a long time between its first announcement after Arc's then latest release—Wizard's Harmony (1995)—and its actual release. It was first released in Japan on May 14, 1998, for the PlayStation. In August of the same year, Arc System Works licensed a North American release to Atlus. Atlus let players choose the game's box art by voting for their favorites from three available box arts. When the contest ended, Atlus released the game on November 9, 1998. In the United Kingdom, the game was published by Virgin Interactive Entertainment, and was released on May 19, 2000. In continental Europe, it was licensed and published by Studio 3 in May 2000.

== Reception ==
Reception

Aggregate score
Aggregator	Score
GameRankings	78%

Review scores
Publication	Score
AllGame	4/5
Computer and Video Games	3/5
Electronic Gaming Monthly	6.7/10
Eurogamer	8/10
Game Informer	8.25/10
GamePro	4/5
GameSpot	7.9/10
IGN	8/10
Jeuxvideo.com	16/20
PlayStation: The Official Magazine	4/5
Dengeki PlayStation	70/100, 65/100, 80/100, 75/100

Reviews for it were generally positive, with an aggregate score of 78% from GameRankings. PlayStation Power reported that both Japanese and American reviewers commended the combination of humor and "futuristic manga-style" action, and the variety of moves and combos. IGN staff said it would be well received by fans of traditional 2D fighting video games and considered it one of the bests of the genre on PlayStation. Writing for Electronic Gaming Monthly (EGM), a reviewer dubbed "Sushi" said it was the second best 2D fighter on PlayStation behind Street Fighter Alpha 2. Harry Slater of Pocket Gamer and Eurogamer's Wesley Yin-Poole affirmed it as regarded "by many to be the greatest 2D, one on one fighter of the era" and "the greatest fighting game of all time", respectively.

Its graphics have been well received by James Mielke of GameSpot, who qualified it as having "fast and fluid animation". Allgame's Michael L. House also described it as "fluid". Writing for Eurogamer, Tom Bramwell noted "the classic 'cartoon' look suits Guilty Gear perfectly", and Randy Nelson from IGN praised its "unrivaled animation quality". Slater stated "it's one of the coolest 2D fighters from a time when 2D fighters just weren't cool". In opposition, Ed Lomas of Computer and Video Games declared, "the graphics aren't great, but a lot of effort has been put into certain characters, especially in terms of animation." An EGM reviewer deemed the graphics and animation as "the big draw" of Guilty Gear, while a Jeuxvideo.com contributor said it could be "more polished".

Its gameplay has been praised, with Mielke, House, and Nelson describing it as "fast, [and] furious". Conversely, Play criticized its speed as "Guilty Gear takes it away too far." Lomas praised its combo system, and compared to Street Fighter Alpha games, while IGN staff also commended its "over-the-top" combos. Bobba Fatt of GamePro, however, complained that it was difficult to perform some special moves. Mielke declared it is "one of the few non-Capcom or SNK 2D fighters to make any sort of impact on the genre." Though stating that Capcom was still the best developer, Nelson said Guilty Gear is "better than 90% of those [2D fighting games] on the market". Similarly, Jeuxvideo.com writer thought it was the game that would "finally provide a valid alternative to Capcom's hegemony" in the niche.

While Lomas called the characters "unoriginal", John R and Shawn from EGM described them as "OK" and "cool-looking". Nelson, on other hand, called them "the best ... outside Capcom/SNK", and Mielke found them "truly awesome", noting that their diversity "keeps Guilty Gear fresh". House declared "superb is the only way to describe them", asserting that they are all "pretty original". A Jeuxvideo.com commentator wrote that they are "varied enough not to bore", while Fatt praised the characters' uniqueness as each have "distinct looks and strategies."

A Jeuxvideo.com reviewer praised its music and sound, while Mielke said its combination created "a truly awesome sound experience". Conversely, House and Nelson felt it "is very unoriginal", and "[s]trictly average", respectively. Most of criticism, however, is directed to how the AI makes the game difficult and how there are some attacks that cause too much damage. EGM's four critics' consensus was that the worst feature of the game was the balance of characters. Both Nelson and Bramwell felt the aforementioned problems are the two major issues of the game. On this matter, House commented "the computer will destroy you a lot", and that "[a] few characters can execute attacks that really take off way too much damage and this is real the problem with the game". In spite of it, Game Informer considered the instant-kill move to be the "biggest" concept introduced by Guilty Gear.

Lomas wrote a more negative review, saying it "is initially totally unappealing, with ... nothing that hasn't been done loads of times before". Game Informer named the game one of the top ten weirdest of all time. In contrast, most of critics were positive in their conclusions. Mielke said it "is as good as it gets", and it was described by House as "just a solid, well-executed 2D fighting game that has class, personality and a great engine". Nelson declared "[n]o true fan of the genre should be without a copy", and Bramwell urged "If 2D beat-em-ups are moving toward extinction, they really are ending on a high note with stuff like this." In retrospect, Evan Shamoon wrote for the Official Dreamcast Magazine that Guilty Gear is one of the most "beloved-yet-under-appreciated" games, commenting it defined itself for its balance, "wonderful art design", and "extremely tight control."

=== Controversy ===
In a 1999 speech condemning advertisements for violent video games aimed at children, U.S. President Bill Clinton held up an advertisement for Guilty Gear, denouncing how the game promoted violence with a tagline about how players could "kill your friends, guilt-free." Years later, a portrait of Clinton was later added to the Digital Figure mode in Guilty Gear Strive (2021) to commemorate the incident.

=== Legacy ===
The Guilty Gear game was the first installment of the series that is considered a cult classic among video game fans. It was followed by five direct sequels, Guilty Gear X (2000), Guilty Gear X2 (2002), Guilty Gear 2: Overture (2007), Guilty Gear Xrd (2014), Guilty Gear Strive (2021), and several spin-offs. Arc System Works re-released Guilty Gear in a "reprinted edition" on September 22, 1999, for a cheaper price. It later became available by download on PlayStation Store as a PSone Classic in Japan on May 31, 2007, in Europe on January 7, 2010, and in PAL region on January 8, 2010. It was also released as a mobile game for PlayStation certified devices in 2012. For the game's 20th anniversary, Arc System Works announced the production of a port for the Nintendo Switch, PlayStation 4 and PC.

== Other media ==
In the same year of the game's release, a strategy guide titled Official Walkthrough Fanbook Guilty Gear Complete Bible was released by Takarajimasha on May 28 in Japan.

Following the game's original release, a soundtrack album was released by Nippon Columbia on May 21, 1998. Guilty Gear Original Sound Collection was composed by Ishiwatari, Takahiro Uematsu, Hatsuaki Takami, Takuya Moritou, arranged by Yasuharu Takanashi, and consisting mostly of rock and heavy metal music.

The album was well received by critics; Don Kotowski of Square Enix Music called the tracks "very enjoyable", but he felt it is "less refined" than subsequent soundtracks. Another reviewer from the same site, GoldfishX, said the only drawback the disc has is the mastering of the CD which can make it difficult to hear the guitars on rhythm in some tracks. Nevertheless, as it was not a problem related to composition, he still gave a perfect score to the soundtrack.

Several themes featured in the game, such as "Keep Yourself Alive" and "Holy Orders (Be Just or Be Dead)", were used in subsequent games, and its soundtrack as a whole became one of the aspects the series is most known for.
