= Pro Jumper! Guilty Gear Tangent!? =

2010 video game

- Promotional artwork for the title.
- Developer: Arc System Works
- Publishers: JP: Arc System Works; NA: Aksys Games
- Director: Masayuki Ishida
- Producer: Kazunori Taguchi
- Programmer: Yuuki Kawakami
- Artists: Yukinori Gouma; Genki Mamada; Hideaki Sawada; Kei Yoshida
- Writers: Atsushi Hirota; Masahiro Murakami
- Series: Guilty Gear
- Platform: Nintendo DSi
- Release: JP: September 1, 2010; NA: June 23, 2011
- Genre: Platformer
- Mode: Single-player

Pro Jumper! Guilty Gear Tangent!? (Note: Japanese: フロジャンプッ！！ ギルティギア外伝！？, Hepburn: Furo Janputsu!! Giruti Gia Gaiden!?) is a 2D platforming game developed by Arc System Works that was released for the Nintendo DSi as part of the system's DSiWare service. It is a spin-off of the Guilty Gear series of fighting games. It stars the character Chimaki, who was jokingly created as the "mascot" of the series despite not being playable in most entries. This is the only game in the series to have him as the protagonist.

== Gameplay ==
The game sees Chimaki, a small, white, rice-like creature, attempt to travel to various different hot springs based on different locations around the world such as Mount Fuji, New York City, and Rome. There are six levels in total, with a harder difficulty version of each being unlocked after completion of the game. Each level has 99 apples as collectibles to obtain, and ends with a boss fight against a rival character who gets tougher as the game progresses.

== Development ==
The character of Chimaki was created in 2004 to serve as a mascot for a column regarding Guilty Gear series news in the Japanese magazine, Monthly Arcadia. The character was named via fan suggestions, with runner-up names suggested being "Mononofu" (もののふ) and "McCartney" (マッカートニー). The character has been jokingly proclaimed by Arc System Works as the "mascot of Guilty Gear" despite his lack of appearances in mainline games beyond secrets or cameos. He is a secret character in the replay mode of Guilty Gear 2: Overture, and appears in art pieces for the game.

Guilty Gear series creator, Daisuke Ishiwatari, is credited as a supervisor for the game.

== Reception ==
Reception

Review scores
Publication	Score
IGN	7/10
Nintendo Life	8/10

Pro Jumper! Guilty Gear Tangent!? received generally favorable scores, with critics complimenting it as a quick, straightforward platforming game. Ron DelVillano of Nintendo Life called it "incredibly charming," and said it was a "complete steal" at 500 Nintendo Points (5 US Dollars). He also hoped that the game would see a release in Europe and PAL territories, which it would not end up receiving. Lucas Thomas of IGN compared the character of Chimaki to a cross between Towelie from South Park and Linus from the Peanuts comic strip, telling readers: "If that brand of madness sounds like a good time to you, go for a download. It's not the best platformer ever, but it's a contender for the wackiest."
