= Testament (Guilty Gear) =

- Guilty Gear character
- Testament's artwork in Guilty Gear Strive by Shoichi Kitazono
- First game: Guilty Gear (1998)
- Created by: Daisuke Ishiwatari
- Voiced by: English: Kayleigh McKee (Strive); Japanese: Takami Akkun (Guilty Gear); Katsuaki Kobayashi (X and XX); Yū Kobayashi (Strive)

In-universe information
- Species: Gear
- Gender: Agender
- Nationality: Swiss

Testament (Japanese: テスタメント) is a fictional character in the Guilty Gear franchise. They first appeared in the first game in the series, Guilty Gear, as a non-playable boss character, once the player had defeated their boss fight they would then be unlocked and become playable, before later appearing in Guilty Gear X and Guilty Gear XX also as a playable character. They did not appear in any other mainline Guilty Gear games until Guilty Gear Strive. They originally appeared as an androgynous male character, before being identified as agender in Guilty Gear Strive, though an earlier interview with series creator Daisuke Ishiwatari noted that they "transcended human existence" and became agender when becoming a Gear. They were originally voiced by Takami Akkun in the first Guilty Gear, before being voiced by Katsuaki Kobayashi in Guilty Gear X and XX. For Guilty Gear Strive, they were voiced by Yū Kobayashi and Kayleigh McKee in Japanese and English respectively, the latter receiving positive reception due to being a transgender actress voicing Testament.

In older releases, Testament had a reputation for being "infamous[ly]" powerful, with multiple players and critics expecting this to remain true in Guilty Gear Strive, though writer AJ Hurst hoped to see them toned down. Testament's depiction was discussed as an early example of a queer character in video games, as well as fitting stereotypes of villainous androgynous characters. Fans debated Testament's gender as well due to their ambiguity. When they were revealed for Strive and confirmed to be agender, the response was generally positive.

== Concept and creation ==
Introduced in the original Guilty Gear, Testament was made to be a "simple expression of the Grim Reaper", and intended mostly to create a suspenseful air for the game's final boss, Justice. Series creator Daisuke Ishiwatari as the series progressed however, wanting to portray them as a "pitiful" character that yearned for family connection. With the game's sequel Guilty Gear X, Ishiwatari gave the character a theme of wanting "to find something to live for and something to protect" due to Testament's "incomplete existence", and he reflected this through the character's relationship with Dizzy, another character who wanted to live a quiet life.

Ishiwatari identified them as androgynous and emphasized this through the character's silhouette, saying that they had "transcended human existence." They originally went by he/him pronouns in the English version, and it was stated that they became agender due to becoming a Gear. Testament was considered for inclusion in Guilty Gear Xrd, but was not included in the end. Ishiwatari presented concept art made for Testament in Xrd, telling viewers at EVO 2022 that this is what they would look like had they been in Xrd. When deciding who to add to Guilty Gear Strive as downloadable content, Testament was chosen due to the belief that they would create buzz since Testament hadn't appeared since Guilty Gear XX. Testament, when introduced into Guilty Gear Strive, was identified using they/them pronouns. Arc System Works marketing rep Riku Ozawa later identified them as agender, saying "neither male nor female, Testament is Testament." Ozawa added that English speakers would say they and them.

Testament was originally voiced by Takami Akkun in the first Guilty Gear, and later by Katsuaki Kobayashi in Guilty Gear X and XX. In Guilty Gear Strive, Testament is voiced in Japanese by Yū Kobayashi in Japanese, in English by Kayleigh McKee, and in Korean by Cho Hyun-jung. McKee also voices Testament's accompanying Succubi in English. During Testament's voice work, Ishiwatari and other members of the team worked with McKee remotely to explore options with the performance. McKee did her voice lines apart from other voice actors, which is typical for the whole cast.

== Appearances ==
Testament first appeared as a secret boss and non-playable character in Guilty Gear. Testament later appeared as a playable character in Guilty Gear X and later Guilty Gear XX. Testament was announced as a downloadable character in Guilty Gear Strive at the ARCREVO America Finals.

== Critical reception ==
Testament has received generally positive reception, considered an early example of a queer character in fighting games. Waypoint writer Renata Price commented that they fit well into an "androgynous villain mold that many queer-coded characters are forced into." Price identified Testament as "embarrassing and messy and built to be hated, but present and compelling nonetheless." When Testament was announced for Guilty Gear Strive, players expected that they would be strong like they were in the older games, with Kotaku writer Ian Walker identifying their "trap-based gameplay" as "infamous." Shack News writer TJ Denzer similarly expected them to be a "projectile and spacing monster as always." Collider writer AJ Hurst considered Testament one of his most-wanted characters for Guilty Gear Strive, stating that while Testament was too strong, he would appreciate a more balanced version of them being included.

Before Guilty Gear Strive, fans debated Testament's gender, which some thinking they were male or female due to their androgynous design. Their new look was well-received by Japanese fans, with Inside Games staff feeling that their hair, expression, thighs, and the performance of Japanese voice actress Yū Kobayashi made them attractive. Testament coming out received positive response from Guilty Gear fans, with the announcement that they would be voiced by a transgender woman garnering excitement due to matching a non-binary character with a trans actor. GamesRadar writer Hirun Cryer speculated that voice actress Kayleigh McKee's specialization in both feminine and masculine voices may have been why she was chosen for the role. Inverse writer Jess Reyes felt that Testament, alongside Bridget, represented a "rare step forward" for LGBTQIA+ representation in video games.

Wired writer Zephin Livingston identified Testament as one of the most prominent examples of an LGBTQ+ character in fighting games. Destructoid writer Chris Moyse identified Testament, alongside Bridget, as their favorite new character of 2022. They noted that they counted them for this since they had "important realizations" about themself, calling their coming out a "seminal moment" of the year. They found Testament's coming out particularly meaningful as a goth who was going through understanding themself. They also called Testament's design "stunning," calling their design "one of the greatest fighting game glow-ups ever" and wishing they looked as good. Their announcement for Guilty Gear Strive made Fanbyte writer Nerium more interested in playing Strive due to being non-binary like Testament and the fact that Testament was an "agender hottie." Game Rant writer David Heath appreciated that Testament's gender was a background element of their character, saying that Testament is just being themselves, regardless of labels. Inside Games discussed how the fact that Testament only had "thinking" as a hobby before Strive, only to have 36 hobbies listed in their profile. They discussed how it made sense that someone who went through what Testament did would have few hobbies, and how Testament's new mindset helped them get more hobbies and happiness. They also discussed how Testament's hobbies were varied between hobbies considered feminine and hobbies considered masculine. They added that comparisons were drawn between the appearances Testament and Japanese fashion model Louis Kurihara, which spurred Kurihara to profess interest in the series.
