= Faust (Guilty Gear) =

Fictional character from Guilty Gear

- Guilty Gear character
- Faust from Guilty Gear Xrd
- First game: Guilty Gear (1998)
- Created by: Daisuke Ishiwatari
- Voiced by: English: Kaiji Tang (Xrd to Strive); Japanese: Kaneto Shiozawa (Guilty Gear); Takashi Kondou (X to Strive)

In-universe information
- Origin: China

Faust (Japanese: ファウスト, Hepburn: Fausuto) is a character in Arc System Works' Guilty Gear fighting game series. Created by Daisuke Ishiwatari, he first appeared as a playable character in the 1998 video game Guilty Gear as Dr. Baldhead (Japanese: ボルドヘッド, Hepburn: Borudo Heddo), a former doctor who became a serial killer after the death of one of his patients. After he regains his sanity, he begins wearing a bag over his head calling himself Faust. As Faust, he travels as an eccentric doctor trying to help others. Originally voiced by Kaneto Shiozawa, after the first game he was voiced by Takashi Kondou for all later appearances. In English, he is voiced by Kaiji Tang as of Guilty Gear Xrd.

As a character Faust has been positively received, in particular due to the nature of his attacks and gameplay which relies somewhat on random chance and has often been compared to a cartoon in motion. The comedy he brings to the games, in contrast to his tragic backstory, has also been praised, leading him to being called one of the franchise's most beloved characters. His appearance in Guilty Gear Strive changed his design significantly, and drew reactions from media outlets that he seemed menacing and macabre compared to previous incarnations, though they acknowledged it did not deviate enough to alienate long-time fans of the character.

== Conception and development ==
Originally introduced in Guilty Gear as Dr. Baldhead, he was designed as a Chinese serial killer doctor who went through "extreme medical training" to be able to contort and stretch his body, but also had a degree of skill in magic that would allow him to summon items such as surgical beds as needed. Daisuke Ishiwatari created him out of a desire of wanting a bald character in the game, as he'd always liked the look of shaved heads. His primary weapon, a two-meter long giant scalpel, was added due to Ishiwatari feeling the combination of it and the bald look made him look more dangerous, and in initial drafts for the game the weapon was named "Margarita". Intended from the start to be an "idiosyncratic" character, the development team admitted this aspect came through far more than they originally intended. In early drafts of his story, he is tasked by the United Nations to enter the first game's tournament, while in the final game it is the character Testament that invites him.

In the game's sequel, Guilty Gear X, the character was replaced with a similar design called Faust. The development team chose to bring him back due to feeling it would be "a waste of an asset" not to, however because at the end of the preceding game he regained his sanity, they wanted to redesign his appearance to make it clear he was on the "side of Justice". A paper bag was added to his head, inspired by both the film The Elephant Man but also a coworker's art of Ishiwatari, which depicted Ishiwatari as a homeless man with a bag hiding his face after the coworker found him sleeping at his desk. While Ishiwatari was aware it was obvious Baldhead and Faust were the same character, he wanted to keep up the mystery as to who Faust was and what became of Baldhead in the game's story. This is reflected in aspects such as his in-game taunt animation, wherein he briefly removes the bag but the shine off his bald head is so bright it obscures all but the silhouette of his face. Ishiwatari wanted to explore the concept of a character that did an irredeemable act trying to make amends, and how those around him would perceive him. He additionally wanted Faust to be aware of this, and to actively question if redemption had any meaning for him and when his life will end.

=== Design ===
Faust's animations were intended to be comical and confuse opponents by contorting his body in "unnatural" ways.

Originally intended to be 199 centimetres (6 ft 6 1/2 in) tall according to early previews of Guilty Gear, his height was adjusted to be significantly higher in the final, standing 282 cm (9 ft 3 in) tall. Despite his height, his standing animation keeps his body lower to the ground and was intended to seem "abnormal". While originally his outfit was more complex, incorporating bits such as white pants, it was simplified to fit how his animations affected his silhouette. As a result his outfit was designed to be light, but less fluttery, with a focus to make it visibly easier to fight with his weapon. His outfit consists of a pair of round glasses, a green shouldered robe with exposed thighs, shoes and socks, and black gloves. His outfit was meant to resemble a leotard, while belts were wrapped around his middle, wrists, and ankles, a feature Ishiwatari noted he was passionate about.

While Faust retains Baldhead's stance and some of his movement, his outfit is changed significantly to a doctor's jacket with a suit and tie underneath. Large buttons permeate throughout the outfit, particularly over the emphasized shoulders of the jacket. A paper bag covers his head, with a single eyehole poked through for his right eye. Ishiwatari felt the singular hole gave the impression that it was hard to discern if Faust was "a good guy or a scary guy". Despite the bag, his animations were designed to allow the bag to emote either by exposing his face partially or altering its shape or the look of the eyehole. This design for Faust persisted until his full redesign in Strive with minor alterations, such as the addition of large red crosses strapped to his arms in Guilty Gear Xrd.

In terms of personality, Baldhead was meant to be visibly insane, viewing his victims as "patients" and to appear highly tense with an unusual laugh. While Baldhead's animations were meant to resemble an insect and be "eerie" and "unusual", Faust's animations were intended to be comical while contorting his body in "unnatural" ways. The development team meanwhile felt that the character's charm came from his balance of being eccentric and gentlemanly, and took delight in how players perceived him as "a good person". Faust is described as having recovered from his insanity, but due to the trauma his original personality was erased and to behave erratically. However, he is emphasized as highly intelligent, and "the compassion and generosity he was once known for has returned undimmed". Ishiwatari described Faust as the character with the "most depth" in the series, and someone that cannot be defined by the dualism of sanity and insanity.

In Guilty Gear Strive, his appearance is changed drastically, his outfit now replaced with blue doctor's scrubs, white gloves, and sneakers. Meanwhile the eyehole in his bag now glows red. A stethoscope is around his neck, while a syringe of red liquid dangles between his legs before his waist. His chest is visible under the collar of the scrubs, showing scarring on the right side. Ishiwatari stated Faust's appearance was due to his guilt consuming him. It impacted his ability to help others, and now he was "living only to find a place to die". However despite his desire to be punished for his actions, Faust tries to hold onto why he originally became a doctor.

== Appearances ==
As introduced in Guilty Gear, he is a Chinese doctor considered brilliant in his field, however after a mishap causes the death of a patient he goes insane and becomes a serial killer. His sanity returns after the events of the first game, and though he considers taking his own life, he feels his death would solve nothing, and becomes an eccentric doctor traveling to help others. He later discovers that the mishap was not his fault but orchestrated against him, and seeks to learn the truth about the conspiracy. During the events of Strive's downloadable content, "Another Story", he uses his abilities to help save Delilah, sister of the character Bedman. While successful, the strain damages him, resulting in his current state as portrayed in the main game. Since his introduction, Faust has appeared in every Guilty Gear title since with the exception of Guilty Gear 2, where he is instead mentioned in the design document as having helped characters Ky Kiske and Dizzy with the birth of their son, Sin. Originally voiced by Kaneto Shiozawa in the first Guilty Gear, Faust was voiced by Takashi Kondou for each installment afterwards. For Guilty Gear Xrd onwards, the character was additionally voiced in English by Kaiji Tang.

The character's gameplay is built around using his tall height and long weapon to confuse opponents. More specifically as Faust, an emphasis on his gameplay was to give him unique special moves "that make it difficult to believe that he is human." While his basic attacks often utilize his long legs and scalpel for mid and long range offensive, his special attacks include moves such as spinning rapidly towards the opponent horizontally, or riding his scalpel like a pogo stick. Meanwhile moves such as "What Could This Be?" will throw out an item randomly from his pocket including various projectiles and "chibi" versions of some characters that walk around for a brief period of time, "From Behind" will have him vanish before emerging from a manifested door that opens in the opponent's face. Throughout the series, he usually has a super attack that relies on a random chance to connect fully, such as "Stimulating Fists of Annihilation" in which the opponent is given three random options and if they choose incorrectly, Faust will stab forward with his fingers suggested to have poked them in the anus, resulting in a comical cutscene reaction.

In extended media for the Guilty Gear franchise, Faust appears in the light novel Guilty Gear X Lightning the Argent, a prequel to the Guilty Gear X game in which he helps Ky investigate a series of murders. Faust also appears in the audio play collection Guilty Gear X Drama CD Vol.2, in which he helps treat a friend of Dizzy's after an assassin tracking Dizzy injures them. Outside of the Guilty Gear series, Faust appeared in the 2019 video game Mistover in an add-on titled "Dark Doctor Faust’s Unexpected Interdimensional Journey", in which he acts as a boss. He also appears as a playable character in the 2020 Arc System Works crossover beat 'em up game Code Shifter. A skin based on him was added for the character Ouka Tadaomi in mobile game #Compass, while an outfit based on his appearance in Strive was added to Tales of the Rays for the character Dist.

== Critical reception ==
In Strive, not only was Faust's appearance changed, but his animations as well to reflect his condition, using emphasized movements described as "menacing" by media outlets.

While Baldhead received little reception, as Faust, the character has been positively received. GameRevolution's Johnny Liu in his review of Guilty Gear X2 felt the character personified the "quirkiness" of the game specifically, due to his massive height but also the bag hiding his bald head. He further stated "strange doesn't begin to describe the guy", praising his gameplay and animations, particularly when he would use an umbrella to exit a completed match similar to the methods of Mary Poppins, further calling it "the coolest victory animation ever." Den of Geek's Jasper Gavin ranked Faust one of the series' best characters, comparing him to Marvel Comics character Deadpool in that he was "the perfect mix of nonsense action and emotional backstory". While he appreciated Guilty Gear's commitment to the "mystery" around what happened to Dr. Baldhead, he felt the character didn't really hit his stride until becoming Faust, the "inexplicable cartoon physics to his febrile behavior" offsetting his past as a serial killer. He added that the character's whimsy and reality-bending actions could "easily make you smile. And isn’t that the best medicine?"

Other outlets offered their own praise. Joel Couture in an article for Siliconera described him as existing to "purely to bring Bugs Bunny levels of mayhem to a game that’s already ridiculous, just not FUNNY ridiculous". A fan of such content in games, he appreciated the amount of chaos the character brought, particularly due to his item generating attacks that allowed for surprise victories, stating "Faust is everything I could want in a fighting game character". Issac Williams of Comic Book Resources described him as "unnerving and epic in equal measure", feeling he stood out amongst the game's cast and while his weapon helped this aspect, feeling they were "exaggerated and cartoonish combat to another level [...] nobody can deny it's a memorable experience." Several of his attacks across the series have also been given specific praise, not only for how they look but also for the reactions they get from the opposing character once they connect.

His redesign in Strive drew varied reactions. Chris Moyse of Destructoid stated that from an art perspective, the emphasized use of shadows traded his usual comical appearance for a more "sinister visual aesthetic". While he acknowledged much of his gameplay was changed, the new appearance made Faust "more menacing – even frightening – than ever before." Ian walker of Kotaku felt the developers "leaned slightly into the more macabre aspects of his design", feeling it "walked the tightrope perfectly" between making the character feel free while trying not to alienate longtime fans, further adding that it gave "a classic character some fun renovations while maintaining the aspects of his design that have endeared him to the fighting game community thus far."

Faust's unique gameplay has been described as a "Luck based" fighting game character. Isaac Vermeer of The Gamer cited him as the template that later characters in other fighting games followed, feeling they tried emulate his "goofy personality and over-the-top moveset" that made him one of the most beloved characters in Guilty Gear. Game developer David Sirlin meanwhile called him "really special in fighting games [...] a miracle they pulled off or something" due to the randomness of some of his attacks. While he acknowledged random behavior in fighting games was something players usually wanted to avoid, it brought a different element of skill to playing the character where players had to "just go with" whatever the results. Players could not practice with Faust like they could other fighting game characters, and instead their effectiveness relied on their adaptability, something he praised Arc System Works for pulling it off so well with Faust.
