= Daisuke Ishiwatari =

South African-Japanese video game developer (born 1973)

- 石渡 太輔
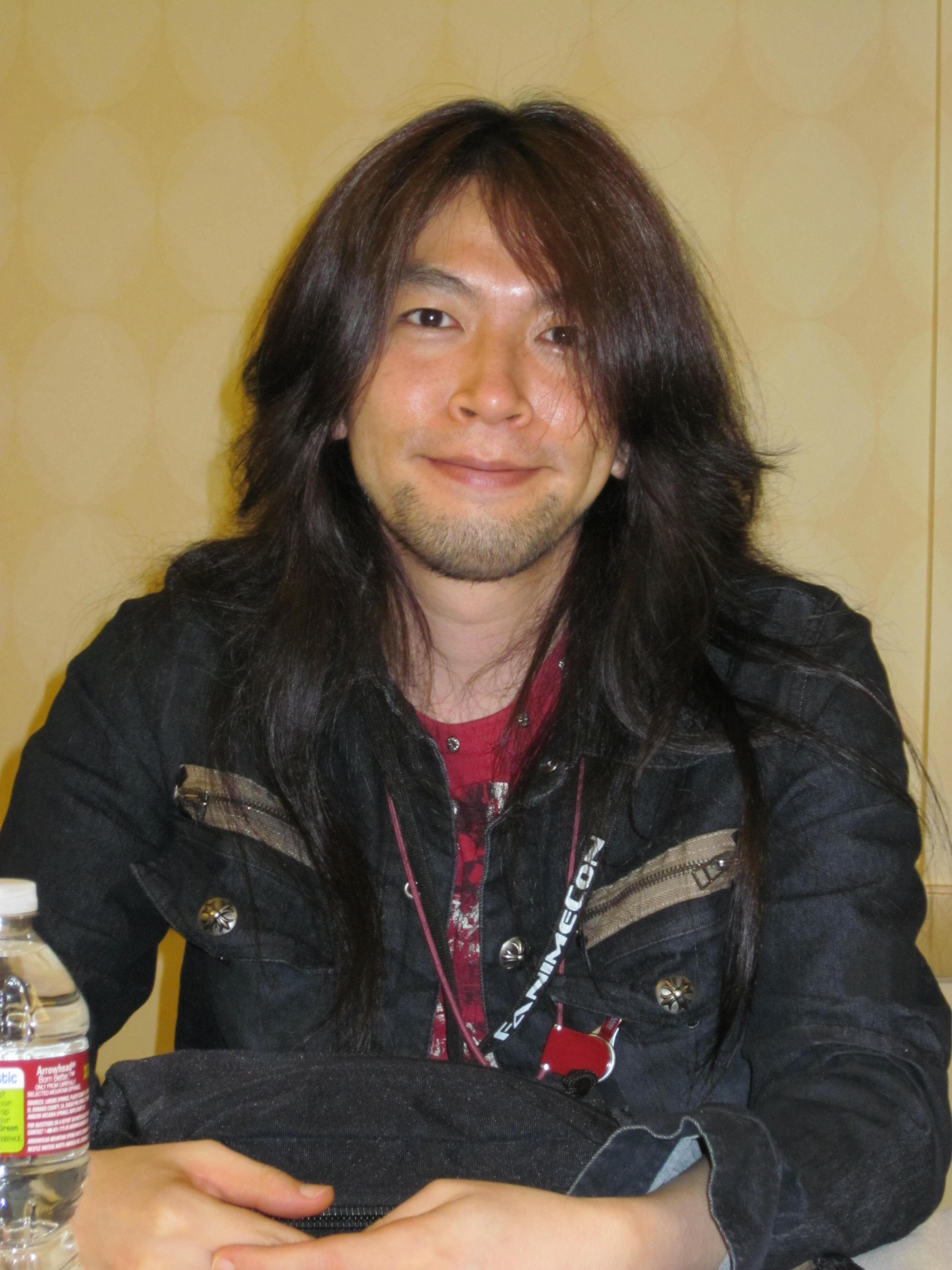
- Ishiwatari at FanimeCon 2010
- Born: August 14, 1973 (age 53); Johannesburg, South Africa
- Citizenship: Japan
- Occupations: Video game developer; illustrator; composer
- Years active: 1995–present
- Notable work: Guilty Gear
- Daisuke Ishiwatari's voice Ishiwatari presenting at Nexon Developers Conference, July 2, 2018.

Daisuke Ishiwatari (石渡 太輔, Ishiwatari Daisuke; born August 14, 1973) is a South African-born Japanese video game developer, illustrator, and composer. He is best known for creating the 2D fighting game series Guilty Gear. He designed the characters, storyline, and wrote the music. He also voiced the protagonist, Sol Badguy, until 2007.

Alongside Guilty Gear, Ishiwatari has worked on several other Arc System Works titles such as BlazBlue as a composer and illustrator, and Battle Fantasia as a voice actor for the character Freed Velez. He would become the Chief Creative Officer of the company in 2018.

Ishiwatari is also a metal and rock composer, and has collaborated with musicians such as Jason Charles Miller, Shin Hae-chul, Lapis Lazuli, Naoki Hashimoto, and AISHA.

== Career ==
=== 1995–1998: Guilty Gear (1998) ===
Ishiwatari studied at Amusement Media Academy, and got a part-job at Arc System Works in 1995 after only a year into his courses. He conceived of the idea for Guilty Gear while he was still in vocational school. During his part-time work before graduating, he would serve as a playtester for various Super Famicom games, including the first fighting game he would work on, Bishōjo Senshi Sailor Moon S: Jōgai Rantō!? Shuyaku Sōdatsusen. One day, he told Arc System Works founder and president, Minoru Kidooka, that he wanted to make a game similar to Street Fighter. Development did not start immediately, as the team was small and had little experience making video games. Once the team had enough resources to begin development, the project took about a year and a half to complete; releasing as Guilty Gear for the PlayStation 1 in 1998.

Daisuke Ishiwatari (left) and Guilty Gear lead programmer Hideyuki Anbe (right) at Nexon Developers Conference 2018.

Ishiwatari had intended for the game's protagonist, Sol Badguy, to be voiced by Koichi Yamadera. However, they were unable to get him on board, so Ishiwatari decided to voice the character himself; a choice that he admits felt impudent. In the same vein, lead programmer Hideyuki Anbe would voice Potemkin. Ishiwatari had no instrumental skills. In order to compose the music for the title, he used music editor in the Famicom game Dezaemon to make MIDIs that he would send over to the game's sound team. For illustrations, Ishiwatari found himself taking inspiration from the artwork for various Capcom titles.

The game received generally positive reception from critics, and as the project was made up of a very small team; it sold well enough to be considered a success.

=== 1999–2006: Guilty Gear follow-ups ===
A new Guilty Gear game for arcade hardware was commissioned by publisher Sammy Studios in February 1999. With Ishiwatari still at the helm, the title would release as Guilty Gear X in June 2000. X was seen as a great continuation from the original title, and would receive praise for its characters, graphics, and soundtrack.

Following the success of the Guilty Gear X, the series would receive many ports, updated versions, and spin-off titles. Some of these titles included: the Wonderswan handheld titles, Guilty Gear Petit and Guilty Gear Petit 2 directed by Emiko Iwasaki, and the expanded sequel to X, Guilty Gear XX.

Ishiwatari would continue to direct and compose music for the series. Three albums using the music from Guilty Gear X would be released featuring added vocals by Japanese band, Lapis Lazuli. Jason Charles Miller would do two albums covering the soundtrack to Guilty Gear XX with vocals. For the South Korean release of the updated version of XX, Guilty Gear X2#Reload, the game would include a brand new, exclusive soundtrack composed by Ishiwatari and Korean musician, Shin Hae-chul.

Ishiwatari would state for his illustrations that he prefers using analog materials, such as Copic markers, over making art digitally.

=== 2007–2010: Guilty Gear 2: Overture and BlazBlue ===
In 2004, Sammy Studios would merge with SEGA. As such, rights of characters introduced in Guilty Gear X or Guilty Gear XX were owned by Sega Sammy Holdings. Due to this, and inspiration that Ishiwatari had received from playing more games from European and American developers, such as First Person Shooters and Real Time Strategy games, he and his team decided to make a Guilty Gear title that was not a fighting game. Guilty Gear 2: Overture would release in November 2007 in Japan for the Xbox 360. Media outlets would liken the title to MOBA and RTS games. Several outlets compared it directly to the Dynasty Warriors series. Ishiwatari said a goal for the title was to find ways for the fun, combo-filled nature of fighting games to enter a new genre. Characters from the original 1998 Guilty Gear appeared, but later additions such as Faust, Dizzy and Bridget were excluded due to rights issues. Arc System Works was hopeful about making future games, whether fighting games or other, with the excluded characters. Ishiwatari would also stop voicing series protagonist, Sol Badguy, in this title in favor of Jouji Nakata. Overture would receive more mixed reception critically than previous titles.

Ishiwatari (right) and BlazBlue creator, Toshimichi Mori (left), signing autographs at FanimeCon 2010.

At the same time, a new fighting game series was also in development at Arc System Works, BlazBlue, and would release its first game, BlazBlue: Calamity Trigger, in November 2008. Ishiwatari would also compose the music for this series. While Ishiwatari stated he was not listening to anything in particular for inspiration during the composition of BlazBlue's music, when asked shortly after its release he stated he was listening to the bands Queen and Soil. An album version of various BlazBlue tracks would be released with vocals from Jason Charles Miller. Ishiwatari would also work on a downloadable game in the Contra series, Hard Corps: Uprising, as an artist and composer. When asked how he felt about downloable titles, Ishiwatari stated that he felt that the advent of digital storefronts was an opportunity to provide fresh experiences to players. However, he expressed concern over the amount of titles appearing digitally with little marketing to make a splash. He also lamented that the infrastructure wasn't availabe for many players to download games off the internet yet.

=== 2011–2017: Guilty Gear Xrd ===
In 2011, Arc System Works would fully purchase the rights of Guilty Gear from Sega Sammy Holdings. Now no longer concerned with rights issues, a new Guilty Gear fighting game would enter production the Spring of the same year under the name Guilty Gear Xrd. Ishiwatari would return as the project's director as part the newly-formed "Team Red" development team in Arc System Works. In tandem with Xrd, Arc System Works would also produce a pachislot gambling game, Guilty Gear Vastedge XT, which would release in 2013. Ishiwatari would also compose the music for this title, and it would mark the first time Ishiwatari would work alongside Naoki Hashimoto of the band Outrage, who would return for several tracks in Xrd.

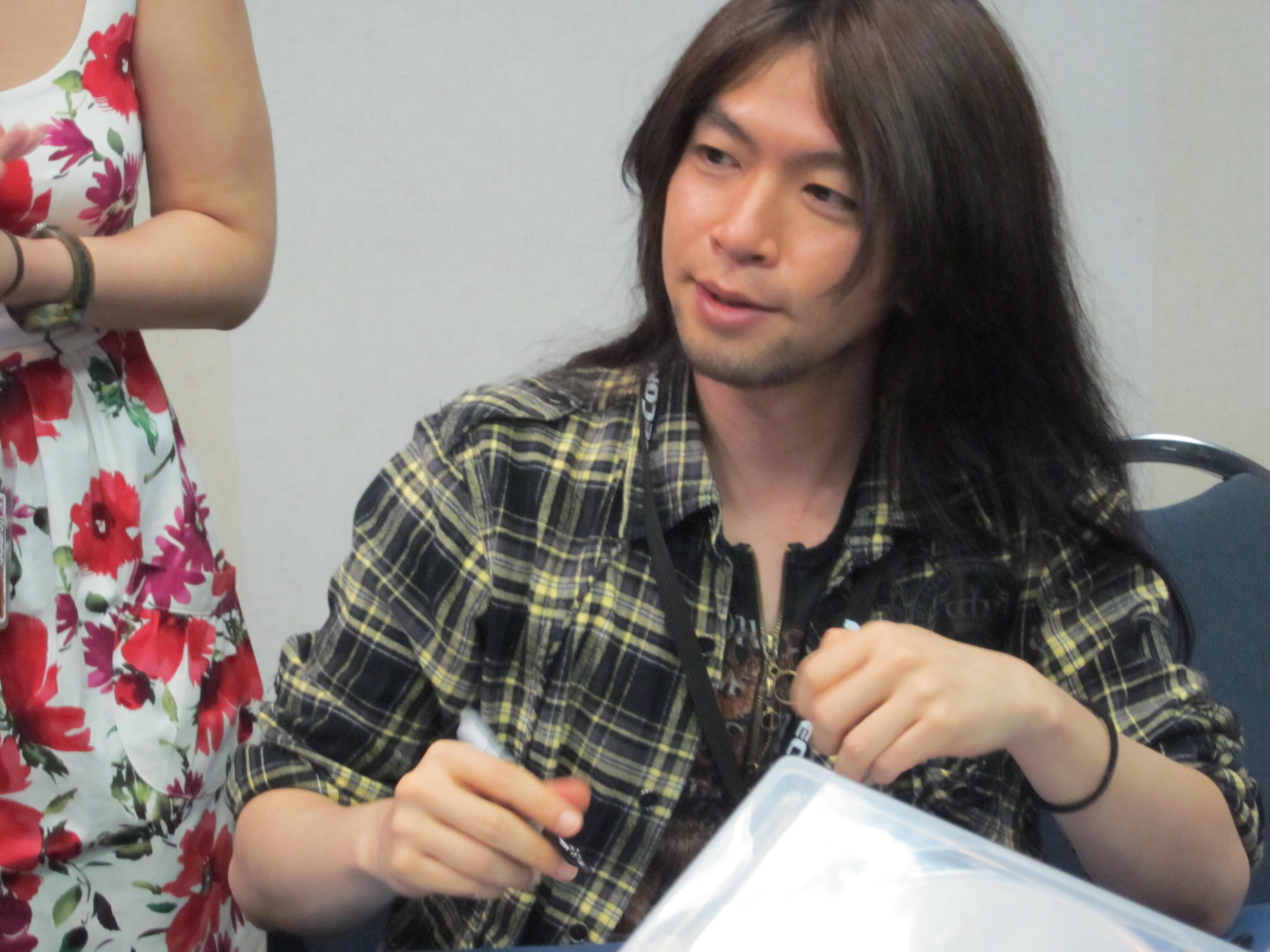
Ishiwatari at FanimeCon 2010.

Guilty Gear Xrd would release in 2014, and receive critical praise for its gameplay, music and artwork/graphics. Xrd boasted a cel-shaded art-style that aimed to recreate the look of a 2D, hand-drawn anime, despite using 3D models in Unreal Engine 3. Ishiwatari stated that after they had reached the "pinnacle" of 2D sprite-work in BlazBlue, the next step in that graphical evolution was 3D graphics that looked like the hand-drawn pixel art. He explained that he and his the team had experimented with 3D visuals, particularly during development of -Overture-, but found the common "photo realism" approach with modeling limiting for the purposes of fighting games. The lighting systems of Xrd were made with "a complete lack of physical accuracy" in order to make the new graphics match as closely to cel animation as possible. Ishiwatari would state that a particularly strong benefit of the new graphic system was how the face could be animated independently from the rest of the body, allowing for many more facial expressions to communicate emotion without dialogue.

Xrd would receive multiple updated releases, ending with Guilty Gear Xrd Rev 2 in March 2017.

=== 2018–present: Guilty Gear Strive and new projects ===
At the beginning of 2018, Ishiwatari would become the Chief Creative Officer of Arc System Works. A new Guilty Gear title was revealed to be in development by Arc System Works at Evo 2018. The following year at Evo 2019, a proper announcement trailer was shown off revealing gameplay and that the title would use Unreal Engine 4. Later that same year, the game would be given a proper title, Guilty Gear Strive. Ishiwatari explained that this title's focus was to allow for Guilty Gear to be enjoyed by a wider range of players, while still maintaining the essence of the series. He elaborated that he aimed for past titles to be like shogi, where if a difference in skill meant the better player would almost always win. The new title would instead aim to be closer to mahjong, where opportunities could be seized by taking aggressive actions and making accurate predictions. Ishiwatari also stated that the overall theme for the series is "what does it mean to be human?"

The title's development would be impacted by the COVID-19 pandemic. The game was delayed to 2021, and would utilize rollback netcode to allow for easier online gameplay for players over longer distances.

Ishiwatari, once again composing music for the title, would decide to give each character their own vocal theme. Naoki Hashimoto would once again return, alongside new vocalists AISHA, and Molly Daisy Scarpine.

After its release in June 2021, Guilty Gear Strive would quickly become the most successful game in the franchise, receiving praise from critics and winning several awards. As of June 2026, Strive had sold over 4 million copies.

After the success of Guilty Gear Strive, Ishiwatari wanted to make sure that younger developers were still able to experiment with new, fresh ideas. Under his tenure as CCO, Arc System Works would begin to develop more experimental, smaller scale games such as visual novel title Dear me, I was... (2025), gorilla-themed survival card game Goritaire (2026), and sci-fi adventure game Donutal (2026). Their publishing division as well would expand to include titles such as Hunter × Hunter: Nen × Impact (2025), and Double Dragon Revive (2026). In October 2026, Arc System Works annouced they would be opening a new studio branch in Shinjuku, Tokyo as part of a deal with Japan's Ministry of Economy, Trade and Industry grant project "IP360," aiming to increase sales of Japanese content in overseas terrorities.

Ishiwatari would direct his first new IP in over 25 years with the twin-stick shooter adventure game Damon and Baby (2026). Ishiwatari's hope with the title was to teach the younger staff members how to make games in different genres, stating "It’s very dangerous to spend decades doing highly specialized work, only to realize later that you’re no longer capable of doing anything else." The title would receive positive-to-mixed critical reception. Critics commonly praised the writing, characters and world-building, but also noted that the combat could become repetitive.

== Influences and philosophy ==
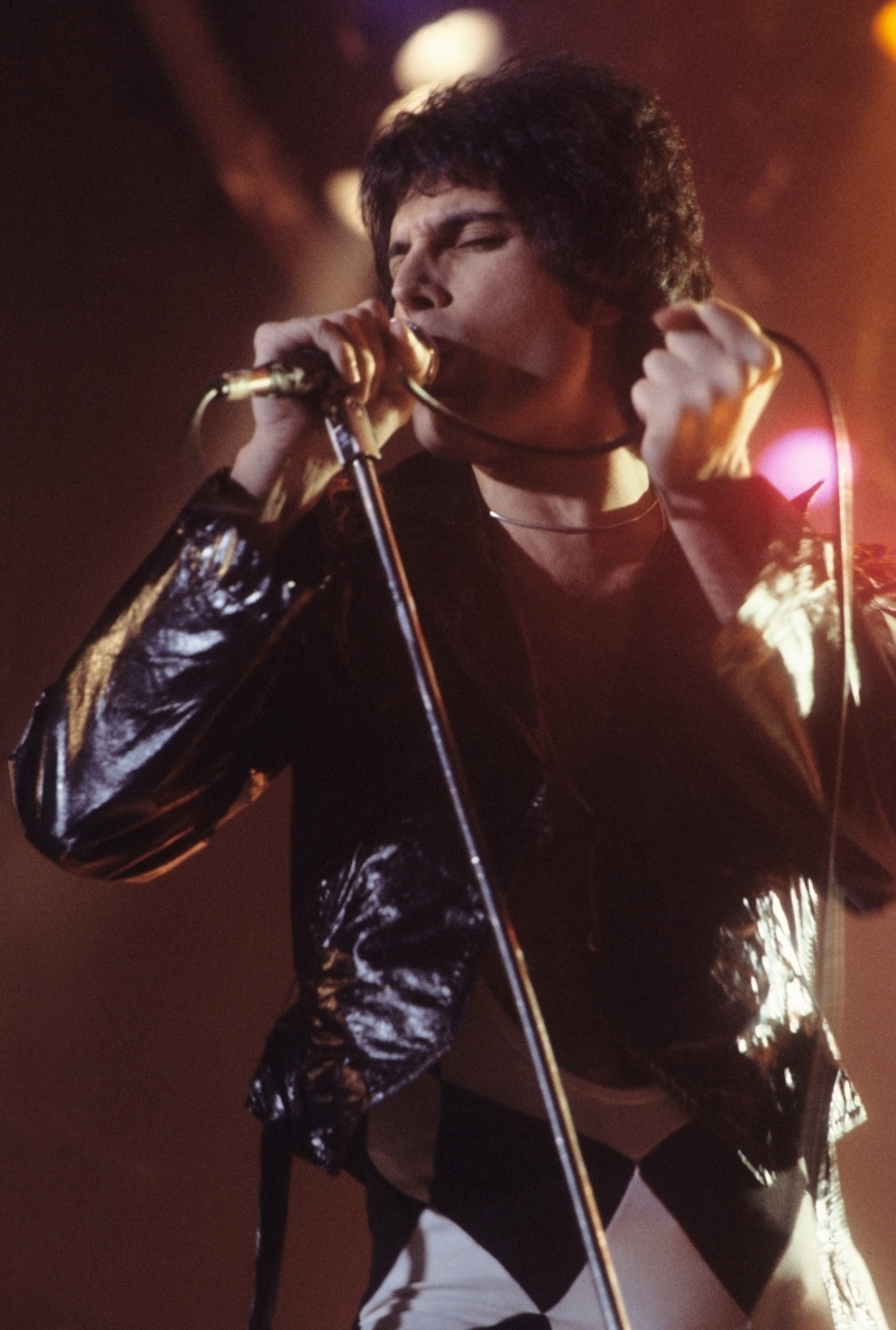
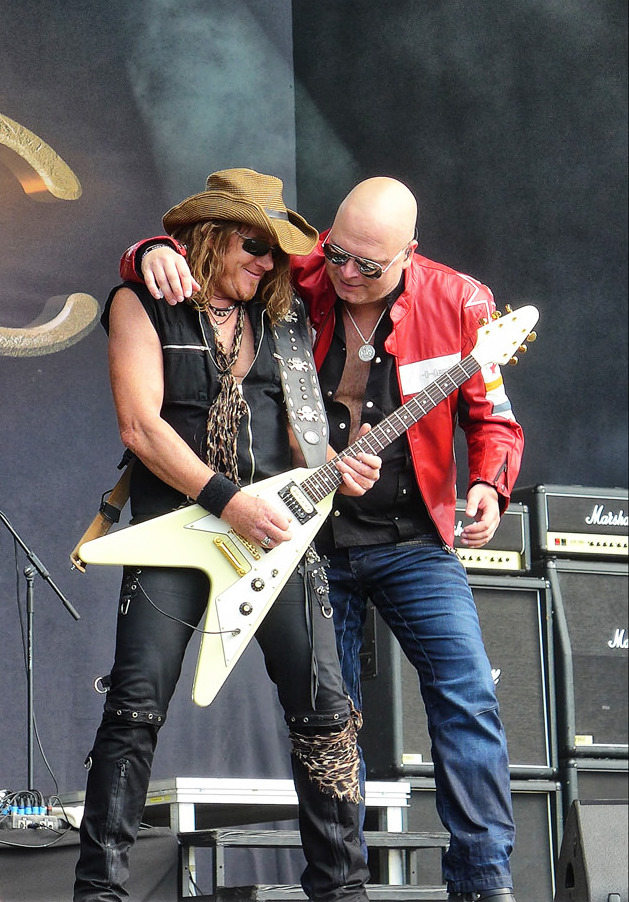
Freddie Mercury (left) and Helloween (right) were the primary inspirations for Guilty Gear's protagonists, Sol Badguy and Ky Kiske.

Ishiwatari first started listening to Western music at a young age after his elementary school used Queen's "Don't Stop Me Now" for an assembly. His first album he picked up was Whitesnake's self-titled album. Ishiwatari believes Queen will always be his favorite band, but has said that he tries to listen to everything. Some of his favorite artists in 2001 included The Beatles, Slayer, and Ringo Sheena; the latter two would go on to inspire his characters of Slayer and I-No.

Ishiwatari has cited the manga Bastard! by Kazushi Hagiwara as an inspiration for character's designs and fashion. Bastard! is known for naming various characters, locations, and key objects after rock and heavy metal musicians, a trait that Ishiwatari would borrow into Guilty Gear. Protagonist, Sol Badguy, takes heavy inspiration from Queen lead-singer, Freddie Mercury, and takes his name from one of Mercury's alias of "Mr. Bad Guy." Ky Kiske takes his name from Helloween band members, Kai Hansen and Michael Kiske. Character Axl Low takes his name from lead singer of Guns n' Roses, Axl Rose. Character Zato-1's shadow companion, Eddie, is named after Eddie, the mascot for Iron Maiden. Character Millia Rage takes her surname from German metal band, Rage.

Ishiwatari has stated that after Guilty Gear X, he says he realized that fighting games were not only action games, but logic games. He changed his philosophy going forward to only start designing a character after their role has been determined. He's stated that he doesn't fully explore a character's story in the work itself, but tries to make each character have a thematic identity, and have a clear intent on how that should be introduced and concluded. Ishiwatari cited manga Kinnikuman as an inspiration to give every character an immediately identifiable silhouette.

Guilty Gear Strive director, Akira Katano, has said that Ishiwatari is always prepared for any past character of his to return at any time, citing how Testament was designed for Guilty Gear Xrd, despite not making any appearance in the final game. Art director, Hidehiko Sakamura, recounted that during development of Guilty Gear Strive, he was working on a character concept that would eventually become Goldlewis Dickinson. However, he was unsatisfied with the concept of a large, intimidating American Secretary of Defense who fought by swinging a ballistic missile. Sakamura thought his concept was too absurd to work, and he asked Ishiwatari to redesign the character. Ishiwatari returned by changing the weapon to an "even more absurd" idea of a coffin from Area 51 with a live alien extraterrestrial inside.

== Personal life ==
Ishiwatari was born in Johannesburg, South Africa. He lived in Japan until the 4th grade when his parents moved back to South Africa. He would return to Japan midway through middle school. As a foreigner, he claims he didn't immediately see the appeal of Japanese music. However, he says he eventually became a fan of Kenji Ohtsuki and the band Begin.

In December 2025, Ishiwatari stated that his child had beaten The Legend of Zelda: Breath of the Wild, and that he was proud that they beat the game before he had himself.

== Works ==
=== Ludography ===
Game Credits
Game	Role	Year	Ref
Bishōjo Senshi Sailor Moon S: Jōgai Rantō!? Shuyaku Sōdatsusen	Playtester	1994	
Virtual Open Tennis	Assistant designer	1995	
EXECTOR	Designer	1995	
Wizard's Harmony	Debugger, pixel art, coloring	1995	
Guilty Gear	Producer, character and graphic designer, programmer, composer, illustrator, Sol Badguy	1998	
Guilty Gear X	Character and graphic designer, composer, opening and ending animations general director, Sol Badguy	2000	
Aquarian Age: Tokyo Wars	Illustrator	2000	
Guilty Gear Petit	Special thanks	2001	
Guilty Gear Petit 2	Special thanks	2001	
Guilty Gear X Plus	Director, Sol Badguy, Illustration contest judge	2001	
Guilty Gear X Advance Edition	Special thanks	2002	
Guilty Gear XX	Composer, Sol Badguy	2002	
Guilty Gear XX ♯Reload	Director, character designer, composer, opening animation designer, Sol Badguy	2003	
Guilty Gear Isuka	Graphic design supervisor, illustrator, composer, Sol Badguy	2003	
Sangokushi Taisen DS	Original Ba Tai design	2005	
Dimension Zero	Card illustration	2005	
Guilty Gear Dust Strikers	Sol Badguy	2006	
Guilty Gear XX Slash	Character designer, character motion concept, composer, Sol Badguy, Order-Sol	2006	
Guilty Gear Judgment	Illustrator, character designer, Sol Badguy	2006	
Battle Fantasia	Voice actor for Freed Velez	2007	
Guilty Gear XX Λ Core	Illustrator, composer, Sol Badguy, Order-Sol	2007	
Guilty Gear 2: Overture	Director, illustrator, original story, composer, special effect designer, "Servant" voice acting	2007	
Guilty Gear XX Λ Core Plus	Illustrator, Sol Badguy, Order Sol	2008	
Blazblue: Calamity Trigger	Composer	2008	
Blazblue: Continuum Shift	Composer	2009	
Hard Corps: Uprising	Art director, character design, scenario, composer	2011	
Pro Jumper! Guilty Gear Tangent!?	Supervisor	2011	
BlazBlue: Chrono Phantasma	Composer	2012	
Guilty Gear XX Λ Core Plus	Illustrator, Sol Badguy, Order Sol	2012	
Guilty Gear Xrd	Director, game designer, character designer, illustrator composer, voice recording director, Swordsman, Walla	2014-2017	
BlazBlue: Central Fiction	Composer	2016	
CHUNITHM CRYSTAL	Illustrator, composer of track "Surrogate Life"	2019	
Guilty Gear -Strive-	Game designer, character designer, illustrator, director	2021	
Damon and Baby	Game designer, character designer	2026	
Marvel Tokon: Fighting Souls	Composer of track "Man in the Metal (Iron Man's Theme)"	2026	

=== Discography ===
This list does not include non-arranged album releases of Ishiwatari's video game soundtracks.

Album Credits
Album	Collaborator(s)	Year	Ref
Guilty Gear X Rising Force Of Gear Image Vocal Tracks -Side.I ROCK YOU!!-	Lapis Lazuli	2001	
Guilty Gear X Rising Force Of Gear Image Vocal Tracks -Side.II SLASH!!-	Lapis Lazuli	2001	
Guilty Gear X Rising Force Of Gear Image Vocal Tracks -Side.III DESTROY!!-	Lapis Lazuli	2001	
Guilty Gear XX in L.A. Vocal Edition	Jason Charles Miller	2004	
Guilty Gear XX in N.Y Vocal Edition	Jason Charles Miller	2004	
BlazBlue in L.A. Vocal Edition	Jason Charles Miller, several others	2011	

=== Filmography ===
TV Credits
TV Show	Role	Year	Ref
Guilty Gear Strive: Dual Rulers	Character design	2025	
