= Guilty Gear =

Series of fighting video games

- Genre: Fighting game
- Developer: Arc System Works
- Publishers: Arc System Works; Aksys Games; PQube; Bandai Namco Entertainment; Netmarble; Sega; Sammy Entertainment; Kiss Ltd.
- Creator: Daisuke Ishiwatari
- Platforms: Arcade; Dreamcast; Game Boy Advance; Nintendo DS; Nintendo Switch; PlayStation; PlayStation 2; PlayStation 3; PlayStation 4; PlayStation 5; PlayStation Portable; PlayStation Vita; Wii; Windows; WonderSwan; Xbox; Xbox 360; Xbox One; Xbox Series X/S
- First release: Guilty Gear; May 14, 1998
- Latest release: Guilty Gear Strive; June 11, 2021

Guilty Gear is a series of fighting games by Arc System Works, created and designed by artist Daisuke Ishiwatari. The first game was published in 1998, and has spawned several sequels. It has also adapted to other media such as manga and drama CDs. Guilty Gear has generally received praise from video game reviewers for its highly technical gameplay, graphics, soundtrack, and for its characters. Another fighting game franchise by Arc System Works, BlazBlue, is considered a spiritual successor of the series.

== Synopsis ==
The story is set in a world where magic has replaced almost every aspect of modern-day technology. But through its dire consequences leading up to the creation of a race of magic-infused creatures known as "Gears", the world has nearly become a post-apocalyptic environment due to Crusades' effects on the world. Although the world is still recovering, much work is still needed to be done and the mysteries behind the creation of the Gears have yet to be resolved.

The story mostly focuses on Sol Badguy, a brash bounty hunter and die hard Queen enthusiast who, feeling guilty of his past creations which in turn, results in him becoming a Gear, decides to make up for his own actions through fighting them whilst keeping his own identity a secret. However, his own reluctance to help others, as well as his selfish actions, often attracts the attention of Ky Kiske, his own rival and former comrade, who tries to get into fights with him whenever annoyed. Throughout the story, Sol enacts his own vengeance upon "That Man", who is mainly the cause behind most of the series' conflicts, through killing him.

As the series progresses, much of his past is revealed, along with his connections with "That Man", as well as his long lost fiancée, Aria Hale. With it, Sol begins to realize that his own past is what deeply conflicts him the most, and through his past rivalries with Ky, as well as his relationships with the other characters, helps to overcome the enemy that he sorely sought to destroy in the first place.

A recurring theme throughout the franchise is redemption, with many of the characters' story arcs revolve around attempting to clear their name and is also presented as a religious motif mainly related to Christianity. Other recurring themes reflect upon real world issues, such as the destructive consequences of wars, racial prejudice, and the dangers of unchecked scientific progress.

== Games ==
=== Main series ===
Game	Details
Guilty Gear Original release dates: JP: May 14, 1998; NA: October 31, 1998; EU: May 2000	Release years by system: 1998 – PlayStation; 2019 – Nintendo Switch, PlayStation 4, Microsoft Windows
Guilty Gear X Original release dates: JP: July 19, 2000; NA: September 30, 2001; EU: March 1, 2002	Release years by system: 2000 – Arcade, Sega Dreamcast; 2001 – PlayStation 2, Microsoft Windows; 2002 – Game Boy Advance
Guilty Gear X2 Original release dates: JP: May 23, 2002; NA: February 4, 2003; EU: March 7, 2003	Release years by system: 2002 – Arcade; 2003 – PlayStation 2
Guilty Gear 2: Overture Original release dates: JP: November 29, 2007; NA: October 7, 2008; EU: September 25, 2009	Release years by system: 2007 – Xbox 360; 2016 – Microsoft Windows
Guilty Gear 2: Overture Original release dates: JP: November 29, 2007; NA: October 7, 2008; EU: September 25, 2009	Notes: First game in the franchise to use English dub, as well as the first entry in the series to use 3D models instead of sprites.; The only main entry that is not a fighting game.
Guilty Gear Xrd -SIGN- Original release dates: JP: February 20, 2014; NA: December 16, 2014; EU: June 3, 2015	Release years by system: 2014 – Arcade, PlayStation 3, PlayStation 4; 2015 – Microsoft Windows
Guilty Gear Xrd -SIGN- Original release dates: JP: February 20, 2014; NA: December 16, 2014; EU: June 3, 2015	Notes: It is the third game under the X title, the second entry in the series to use 3D models instead of sprites, and the 5th mainline title overall.; Second game in the franchise to use English dub.
Guilty Gear Xrd -REVELATOR- Original release dates: JP: August 25, 2015; NA: June 7, 2016; EU: June 10, 2016	Release years by system: 2015 – Arcade; 2016 – PlayStation 3, PlayStation 4, Microsoft Windows
Guilty Gear Xrd -REVELATOR- Original release dates: JP: August 25, 2015; NA: June 7, 2016; EU: June 10, 2016	Notes: Currently updated to Guilty Gear Xrd -REV 2-
Guilty Gear Strive Original release dates: WW: June 11, 2021	Release years by system: 2021 – PlayStation 4, PlayStation 5, Microsoft Windows, Arcade; 2023 – Xbox One, Xbox Series X/S; 2025 – Nintendo Switch
Guilty Gear Strive Original release dates: WW: June 11, 2021	Notes: Announced with the working title New Guilty Gear.; Third game in the franchise to use English and Korean dubs (Korean dub added in Ver. 1.05), marks the first time to have finally credited the dubbing's voice actors and both dub languages selectable.; Asian and European versions of the home release published by Bandai Namco Entertainment; The arcade version was published by Sega Interactive.

=== Updated versions ===
Game	Details
Guilty Gear X Plus Original release dates: JP: November 29, 2001; EU: March 1, 2002	Release years by system: 2001 – PlayStation 2
Guilty Gear X Plus Original release dates: JP: November 29, 2001; EU: March 1, 2002	Notes: Released in Japan and South Korea.; First game in the franchise to use Korean dub.
Guilty Gear X ver 1.5 Original release dates: JP: November 29, 2001; EU: March 1, 2002	Release years by system: 2003 – Arcade
Guilty Gear X ver 1.5 Original release dates: JP: November 29, 2001; EU: March 1, 2002	Notes: Atomiswave arcade-system version.
Guilty Gear X2 #Reload Original release dates: JP: March 26, 2003; NA: September 14, 2004; EU: November 26, 2004	Release years by system: 2003 – Arcade; 2004 – PlayStation 2, Xbox; 2005 – Microsoft Windows, PlayStation Portable
Guilty Gear X2 #Reload Original release dates: JP: March 26, 2003; NA: September 14, 2004; EU: November 26, 2004	Notes: Hidden character Robo-Ky is made playable from the beginning.; The South Korean version of the game features an alternate soundtrack.; Second game in the franchise to use Korean dub.
Guilty Gear XX Slash Original release dates: JP: September 28, 2005	Release years by system: 2005 – Arcade; 2006 – PlayStation 2
Guilty Gear XX Slash Original release dates: JP: September 28, 2005	Notes: New characters introduced to the game, A.B.A and Order-Sol.
Guilty Gear XX Accent Core Original release dates: JP: December 20, 2006; NA: September 11, 2007; EU: February 29, 2008	Release years by system: 2006 – Arcade; 2007 – PlayStation 2, Nintendo Wii
Guilty Gear XX Accent Core Original release dates: JP: December 20, 2006; NA: September 11, 2007; EU: February 29, 2008	Notes: New mechanics added to the game, Force Break, Slashback, and Throw Breaks.; Characters Justice and Kliff were removed from the playable cast.
Guilty Gear XX Accent Core Plus Original release dates: JP: March 27, 2008; NA: May 12, 2009; EU: May 20, 2011	Release years by system: 2008 – PlayStation 2, PlayStation Portable; 2009 – Nintendo Wii; 2012 – Xbox 360, PlayStation 3
Guilty Gear XX Accent Core Plus Original release dates: JP: March 27, 2008; NA: May 12, 2009; EU: May 20, 2011	Notes: This version features a new story mode which is a continuation of the storyline from Guilty Gear X2.; Characters Justice and Kliff were added back and balancing changes were made across all playable characters.
Guilty Gear XX Accent Core Plus R Original release dates: JP: September 20, 2012; NA: April 23, 2013; EU: February 14, 2013	Release years by system: 2012 – Arcade; 2013 – PlayStation Vita, PlayStation 3, Xbox 360; 2015 – Microsoft Windows; 2019 – Nintendo Switch
Guilty Gear XX Accent Core Plus R Original release dates: JP: September 20, 2012; NA: April 23, 2013; EU: February 14, 2013	Notes: Further balancing changes were incorporated in this version.; The PlayStation 3 and Xbox 360 versions of Accent Core Plus received a free update to the Plus R version.; The Nintendo Switch release features the option to change the BGM to the 2003 South Korean release soundtrack.
Guilty Gear Xrd REV 2 Original release dates: JP: May 25, 2017; NA: May 26, 2017; EU: May 26, 2017	Release years by system: 2017 – Microsoft Windows, PlayStation 3, PlayStation 4
Guilty Gear Xrd REV 2 Original release dates: JP: May 25, 2017; NA: May 26, 2017; EU: May 26, 2017	Notes: Introduction of 2 new playable characters, rebalancing of the cast, online mode improvements, and additional story scenarios.; First installment in the Guilty Gear series to receive a simultaneous release across consoles and PC.; Immediate update from Guilty Gear Xrd -REVELATOR- instead of standalone update.

=== Spin-offs ===
Game	Details
Guilty Gear Petit Original release dates: JP: January 25, 2001	Release years by system: 2001 – Wonderswan
Guilty Gear Petit Original release dates: JP: January 25, 2001	Notes: 2D fighting game in super deformed style. Has one series-exclusive character, Fanny.
Guilty Gear Petit 2 Original release dates: JP: September 27, 2001	Release years by system: 2001 – Wonderswan
Guilty Gear Isuka Original release dates: JP: December 17, 2003; NA: November 2, 2004; EU: June 16, 2005	Release years by system: 2003 – Arcade; 2004 – PlayStation 2, Xbox; 2005 – Microsoft Windows
Guilty Gear Isuka Original release dates: JP: December 17, 2003; NA: November 2, 2004; EU: June 16, 2005	Notes: 4-player battle arena fighting game.
Guilty Gear Dust Strikers Original release dates: JP: October 5, 2006; NA: April 25, 2006; EU: August 3, 2007	Release years by system: 2006 – Nintendo DS
Guilty Gear Dust Strikers Original release dates: JP: October 5, 2006; NA: April 25, 2006; EU: August 3, 2007	Notes: 4-player battle arena fighting game.
Guilty Gear Judgment Original release dates: JP: August 24, 2006; NA: September 5, 2006; EU: August 3, 2007	Release years by system: 2006 – PlayStation Portable
Pro Jumper! Guilty Gear Tangent!? Original release dates: JP: September 1, 2010; NA: June 23, 2011	Release years by system: 2010 – DSiWare

== Gameplay ==
Guilty Gear consists primarily of one-on-one competitive battles. Players are tasked with depleting their opponent's life gauge by utilizing attacks unique to each playable character. In the case of timed matches, the player with the most remaining life when time runs out is the victor of that round. The series' emphasis on speed and technicality along with the introduction of unique movement options such as the "air dash" would ultimately become the foundation for the "anime" subgenre of fighting games.

Guilty Gear Isuka prominently allowed up to four simultaneous players in battle, as well as the option to divide the characters into teams. It also eschewed the typical multiple-round format in favor of each player having a limited stock of "souls". Depleting a player's life gauge decreased their stock of souls and temporarily incapacitated them, and each remaining soul allowed a player to return to battle with a full life gauge. They would be defeated for the rest of the match if their life gauge and souls were both exhausted. These features have not returned for subsequent games.

Each game in the series includes a "Tension Gauge" that fills as the player performs offensive maneuvers, such as approaching the opponent or attacking them. Portions of the Tension Gauge can be expended to perform various techniques. Each character has at least one "Overdrive"; special attacks that can deal extensive damage to an opponent or bolster aspects of the user, like speed or attack power. "Faultless Defense" allows players to prevent "chip damage," damage received from normally guarding against special attacks, at the expense of the Tension Gauge. Guilty Gear X and later titles introduced more advanced techniques involving the Tension Gauge, such as the "Roman Cancel", allowing players to immediately stop the remaining animation of an attack, and "Dead Angle Attacks", counterattacks performed while a player is guarding.

The Tension Gauge is also tied in with the usage of "instant kill" techniques, which are high-risk attacks that are often difficult to connect but instantly defeat the opponent regardless of the amount of life remaining. In Guilty Gear, these attacks ended the entire match if they successfully hit the opponent, but this was toned down in later games by ending the round instead. Failing to connect with the technique penalizes the user by removing the Tension Gauge and its related uses for the rest of the round.

Guilty Gear X2 introduced a "Burst Gauge" that slowly fills during the progression of a match. When completely filled, players can perform a "Psyche Burst" in an attempt to quickly stop an opponent's offense, even knocking back the opponent if they are close enough. This mechanic has also appeared in some form in other Arc System Works games, such as BlazBlue and Persona 4 Arena, as well as other fighting games such as Skullgirls.

Many characters also feature their own unique mechanics that differentiate them from each other. For example, Zato-1 utilizes a shadow-like symbiotic creature named Eddie that is able to detach itself and be controlled separately for a period of time, allowing complex tandem attacks between the two. Venom can set out weaponized billiard balls on screen that can be projected in various directions depending on how the player strikes them with certain attacks. Johnny carries a limited set of coins that can be thrown at the opponent. Though the coins themselves deal little damage, each successive hit strengthens his "Mist Finer" technique to incredibly powerful levels.

=== Playable characters ===
Character	Guilty Gear	X	Petit	X2	Isuka	DS	Judgment	2	Xrd	Strive	Appearances
A.B.A	No	No	No	XX Slash	Playstation	No	No	No	No	DLC3	3
Anji Mito	No	Yes	Petit 2	Yes	Yes	Yes	Yes	No	No	Yes	7
Answer	No	No	No	No	No	No	No	No	Rev 2	No	1
Asuka R. Kreutz / Asuka R♯	No	No	No	No	No	No	No	No	No	DLC2	1
Axl Low	Yes	Yes	Petit 2	Yes	Yes	Yes	Yes	No	Yes	Yes	9
Baiken	Yes	Yes	No	Yes	Yes	Yes	Yes	No	Rev 2	DLC1	8
Bedman	No	No	No	No	No	No	No	No	Yes	DLC2^{g}	2
Bridget	No	No	No	Yes	Yes	Yes	Yes	No	No	DLC2	5
Chipp Zanuff	Yes	Yes	Petit 2	Yes	Yes	Yes	Yes	No	Yes	Yes	9
Dizzy	No	Yes	No	Yes	Yes	Yes	Yes	No	Rev DLC	DLC4	7
Dr. Paradigm	No	No	No	No	No	No	No	Yes	No	No	1
Elphelt Valentine	No	No	No	No	No	No	No	No	Yes ^{e}	DLC3	2
Fanny	No	No	Yes	No	No	No	No	No	No	No	1
Faust/Dr. Baldhead	Yes	Yes	Petit 2	Yes	Yes	Yes	Yes	No	Yes	Yes	9
Giovanna	No	No	No	No	No	No	No	No	No	Yes	1
Goldlewis Dickinson	No	No	No	No	No	No	No	No	No	DLC1	1
Holy Order-Sol	No	No	No	XX Slash	No	No	No	No	No	No	1
Happy Chaos	No	No	No	No	No	No	No	No	No	DLC1	1
I-No	No	No	No	Yes	Yes	Yes	Yes	No	Yes	Yes	6
Izuna	No	No	No	No	No	No	No	Yes	No	No	1
Jack-O' Valentine	No	No	No	No	No	No	No	No	Rev	DLC1	2
Jam Kuradoberi	No	Yes	Yes	Yes	Yes	Yes	Yes	No	Rev	DLC5	8
Johnny	No	Yes	Petit 2	Yes	Yes	Yes	Yes	No	Rev	DLC3	8
Judgment	No	No	No	No	No	No	Yes	No	No	No	1
Justice	Yes	X Plus	No	Yes ^{f}	No	No	No	No	No	No	3
Kliff Undersn	Yes	X Plus	No	Yes ^{f}	No	No	No	No	No	No	3
Ky Kiske	Yes	Yes	Yes	Yes	Yes	Yes	Yes	Yes	Yes	Yes	10
Kum Haehyun	No	No	No	No	No	No	No	No	Rev DLC	No	1
Leo Whitefang	No	No	No	No	No	No	No	No	Yes ^{e}	Yes	2
Leopaldon	No	No	No	No	Yes	No	No	No	No	No	1
Lucy^{h}	No	No	No	No	No	No	No	No	No	DLC4	1
May	Yes	Yes	Yes	Yes	Yes	Yes	Yes	No	Yes	Yes	9
Millia Rage	Yes	Yes	Yes	Yes	Yes	Yes	Yes	No	Yes	Yes	9
Nagoriyuki	No	No	No	No	No	No	No	No	No	Yes	1
Potemkin	Yes	Yes	Yes	Yes	Yes	Yes	Yes	No	Yes	Yes	9
Ramlethal Valentine	No	No	No	No	No	No	No	No	Yes	Yes	2
Raven	No	No	No	No	No	No	No	Yes	Rev^{e}	No	2
Robo-Ky	No	X Plus	No	Yes	No	Yes	No	No	No	DLC5	4
Robo-Ky Mk. II	No	No	No	No	Playstation	No	No	No	No	No	1
Sin Kiske	No	No	No	No	No	No	No	Yes	Yes ^{e}	DLC2	3
Slayer	No	No	No	Yes	Yes	Yes	Yes	No	Yes	DLC3	6
Sol Badguy	Yes	Yes	Yes	Yes	Yes	Yes	Yes	Yes	Yes	Yes	10
Testament	Yes	Yes	Petit 2	Yes	Yes	Yes	Yes	No	No	DLC1	8
Unika	No	No	No	No	No	No	No	No	No	DLC4	1
Valentine	No	No	No	No	No	No	No	Yes	No	No	1
Venom	No	Yes	No	Yes	Yes	Yes	Yes	No	Yes	DLC4	7
Zappa	No	No	No	Yes	Yes	Yes	Yes	No	No	No	4
Zato-1 / Eddie	Yes	Yes	Petit 2	Yes	Yes	Yes	Yes	No	Yes	Yes	9
Total	13	19	14	25	23	21	21	7	24^{+1}	15^{+19}	

Notes

^a Playable in the Slash update onward, Guilty Gear XX Slash.
^b Only playable in the PlayStation 2 version.
^c Only in Guilty Gear Petit 2.
^d Only in the update version, Guilty Gear X Plus.
^e Can be unlocked via in game currency or a DLC purchase
^f Kliff and Justice were balanced for tournament play in the Guilty Gear XX Accent Core Plus R update, and were absent in Guilty Gear XX Accent Core.
^g Appears under the name "Bedman?", who is Bedman's sentient weaponized bed robot accompanied by his sister Delilah.
^h Guest character.

== Media ==
In addition to the Guilty Gear video game series, other products were also released. Two novelizations of Guilty Gear X were written by Norimitsu Kaihō, illustrated by Daisuke Ishiwatari, and published by Enterbrain: Lightning the Argent (Note: Japanese: 白銀の迅雷 (lit. Silver Lighting)), and The Butterfly and Her Gale (Note: Japanese: 胡蝶と疾風 (lit. Lighting and Gale)), on January 20, 2001, and on August 24, 2002. A manga titled Guilty Gear Xtra, a collaboration among Daisuke Ishiwatari, Norimitsu Kaihō, and Akihito Sumii, was serialized in Kodansha's Magazine Z on September 22, 2003. Studio DNA and Enterbrain also published comics anthologies.

Several drama CDs were published; Scitron released a series of two drama CDs—Guilty Gear X Vol. 1 and Vol. 2—between October 24, and November 24, 2001, and two series of drama CDs based on Guilty Gear X2 were released by Team Entertainment: Red and Black—a series— were released in 2003 between July 16, and August 20. Another series of drama CDs, Night of Knives, was published in three volumes between October 20 and December 22, 2004. Also action figures, guidebooks, and a trading card game series based on Guilty Gear were released.

On February 11, 2017, Arc System Works announced a collaboration with Tecmo Koei's Team Ninja to release an Arc System Works Costume Set consisting of the costumes of some characters from the BlazBlue and Guilty Gear series in March 2017 for Dead or Alive 5: Last Round. Guilty Gear cosmetics are unlockable in the PC version of Them's Fightin' Herds for players that also own Guilty Gear Xrd Rev 2.

An anime series, Guilty Gear Strive: Dual Rulers, was announced in June 2024. The series premiered in April 2025, with 8 total episodes. It continues the story of Guilty Gear Strive, introducing the character Unika prior to her release as a playable fighter in-game.

== Reception and legacy ==
Aggregate review scores As of July 13, 2021.
Game	Metacritic
Guilty Gear	NA
Guilty Gear X	(PS2) 79% (GBA) 67
Guilty Gear X2	(PS2) 87%
Guilty Gear X2 #Reload	(Xbox) 86%
Guilty Gear Isuka	(PS2) 73%
Guilty Gear Dust Strikers	(DS) 60%
Guilty Gear Judgment	(PSP) 77%
Guilty Gear XX Accent Core	(PS2) 77% (Wii) 75
Guilty Gear 2: Overture	(360) 56%
Guilty Gear XX Accent Core Plus	(Wii) 76% (360) 74 (PS3) 75
Pro Jumper! Guilty Gear Tangent!?	NA
Guilty Gear XX Accent Core Plus R	(PSVita) 71%
Guilty Gear Xrd SIGN	(PS4) 84%
Guilty Gear Strive	(PS5) 87%

The Guilty Gear series is thought as cult classic among video game fans. The series has often been remarked upon for its visual elements, fighting engine, soundtrack, and the variety of designs of the characters and attacks. X's Dreamcast version has the highest score of the series as compiled by review aggregator GameRankings (89.33%), while X2 for PlayStation 2 occupies that position according to the other major aggregator, Metacritic (87). On the other hand, the lowest score is given to Guilty Gear 2: Overture from both GameRankings (58.19%) and Metacritic (56/100).

Guilty Gear is considered by several sources to be the greatest 2D fighting game. GameSpot said that "Guilty Gear is one of the few non-Capcom or SNK 2D fighters to make any sort of impact on the genre", while Eurogamer stated: "If 2D beat-em-ups are moving toward extinction, they really are ending on a high note with stuff like this." Its sequels were also well received. GameSpy said "Guilty Gear X is hands-down the best 2D fighting game to date", and Guilty Gear X2 was described by About.com as "easily the best 2D fighter to come around in a long time."

In 2012, Complex ranked Guilty Gear at number 47 on the list of the best video game franchises, commenting: "Where other fighters were moving toward realism and more down to Earth physics and combos, Guilty Gear was content to turn those notions on their head, paving the way for the more chaotic fighters we're seeing today." Yahoo! Voices' editor S.W. Hampson included Guilty Gear among the 10 best fighting game franchises of all time, praising the series's evolution along the years, the "distinctive visual flair" of its 2D sprites, and the "well-defined story lines", adding "its identity is among the most unique in the world of beat-'em-ups."

BlazBlue: Calamity Trigger, another fighting game developed by Arc System Works, was once considered a spiritual successor of the Guilty Gear series.

In an interview with Dexerto, creator Daisuke Ishiwatari said that Guilty Gear Strive was made to change the direction of the series completely. Arc System Works CEO Minoru Kidooka commented that while the game represented a big departure for the series, the company is happy with their new expanded audience.
