= Guilty Gear Xrd =

Japanese fighting game developed by Arc System Works

- Cover of the home console versions of Sign
- Developer: Arc System Works
- Publishers: Arcade: JP: Sega; PS3, PS4: JP: Arc System Works; NA: Aksys Games; EU: Sony Computer Entertainment (Sign); EU: PQube (Revelator, Rev 2); Windows: WW: Arc System Works
- Directors: Daisuke Ishiwatari; Takeshi Yamanaka
- Designer: Daisuke Ishiwatari
- Artist: Hidehiko Sakamura
- Writers: Daisuke Ishiwatari; Takeshi Yamanaka; Yoshito Shoudai
- Composers: Daisuke Ishiwatari; Norichika Sato
- Series: Guilty Gear
- Engine: Unreal Engine 3
- Platforms: Arcade; PlayStation 3; PlayStation 4; Microsoft Windows
- Release: Sign; Arcade: JP: February 20, 2014; PS3, PS4: JP: December 4, 2014; NA: December 16, 2014; EU: June 3, 2015 (Digital-only); Windows: WW: December 9, 2015; Revelator; Arcade: JP: August 25, 2015; PS3, PS4: JP: May 26, 2016; NA: June 7, 2016; EU: June 10, 2016; Windows: WW: December 14, 2016; Rev 2 Arcade: JP: March 30, 2017; PS3, PS4: JP: May 25, 2017; NA: May 26, 2017; EU: May 26, 2017; Windows: WW: May 31, 2017
- Genre: Fighting
- Modes: Single-player; Multiplayer
- Arcade system: Sega RingEdge 2

Guilty Gear Xrd (Note: Japanese: ギルティギア イグザード, Hepburn: Giruti Gia Iguzādo) (Note: The "Xrd" is pronounced as "Ex Ard") is a fighting video game sub-series by Arc System Works and part of the Guilty Gear series. Guilty Gear Xrd was developed using Unreal Engine 3, with cel-shaded graphics in place of the series' traditional hand-drawn sprites. Following the storyline of the last game in the series, Guilty Gear 2: Overture, it introduced seven new characters.

The first Xrd game, Guilty Gear Xrd Sign, was released in arcades on February 20, 2014, as the 5th main installment, and for the PlayStation 3 and PlayStation 4 in Japan and North America in December of the same year. A digital-only release happened in Europe in June 2015, and it was brought to Microsoft Windows via Steam on December 9, 2015. The game has been praised for its cel-shaded graphics and approachable gameplay, but criticized for its non-interactive story mode and smaller roster of characters.

A sequel follow-up, (Note: Some sources referred to it as an "update" or a new version of Sign, while others called it a new installment.) titled Guilty Gear Xrd Revelator, was released on consoles in May 2016 in Japan and June 2016 elsewhere as the 6th main installment. An update title to Revelator titled Guilty Gear Xrd Rev 2 was announced at Arc System Works Fighting Game Award 2016 on January 14, 2017, and released for Arcades in March 2017, while PS3, PS4 and PC versions were released worldwide at the end of May 2017. The Rev 2 update patch for those who bought Revelator on PlayStation Store or Steam was released as a paid DLC. The PS4 also received an exclusive physical disc version.

== Gameplay ==
The game uses a six-button layout: five of which are responsible for the attacks—punch, kick, slash, heavy slash and dust—and the other one for taunting or respecting the other player. There are several other techniques which are triggered when two or three buttons are pressed simultaneously. A burst gauge is filled as time goes by or when the player receives damage; once the gauge is filled, the player can perform a Psych Burst to move away from the opponent. It unleashes a blast of energy that, if it successfully hits the adversary, completely charges another gauge, the tension gauge. The tension gauge allows the player to perform certain other special attacks.

The game features four main modes: Network Mode, Practice Mode, Battle Mode and Story Mode. The first allows online matches through the PlayStation Network (PSN) or Steam, depending on the platform, which may be ranked in world rankings. The Practice Mode features a regular training mode, a tutorial mode that teaches the basic controls, a mission mode that simulates battle situations, and a challenge mode that is focused on performing combos.

The Battle Mode comprises the arcade mode, which unveils part of the game's story after the player defeats eight opponents; a versus mode, in which the player can have offline battles with a second player or against a CPU; and a special "M.O.M" mode. The M.O.M. Mode, which is an acronym for "Medal of Millionaires", is a variation of the regular survival mode in which the player earns medals based on performance and improves through a progression system.

The last mode of Guilty Gear Xrd is the Story Mode, which is new in the current installment. This mode presents the full game story as a film-like animation divided into several chapters, for uninterrupted viewing. The viewer can pause the movie at any time to investigate a glossary of game terms and plot devices, which are described in the library mode.

== Synopsis ==
=== Plot ===
The game is set in 2187, one year after its predecessor, Guilty Gear 2: Overture.

Starting in Sign's storyline, the first part is set in arcade mode (episode mode in Revelator/REV2) through each characters' own storyline, besides Elphelt, and focuses on Ramlethal Valentine's arc, while the second part of the storyline is set after arcade mode's storyline on the console version, focusing on after the capture of Ramlethal in Conclave and Justice's arc, and also serves as the beginning of Elphelt Valentine's arc in the final chapter.

Later in Revelator/REV2, the storyline now focuses on Elphelt Valentine and Jack-O's arc since the final chapter of Sign's story mode on console version. The episode mode features new character storylines for the Sign cast and the new characters in Revelator, besides Jam.

In REV2, three Additional storyline scenarios that follows the concluded epilogue of Revelator's story, known as "After Story", as well as new character storylines for Jam and the new characters in REV2, in episode mode, were added.

=== Characters ===
The arcade version of the game initially featured thirteen playable characters. Sol Badguy, Ky Kiske, Millia Rage, May, Chipp Zanuff, Potemkin, Venom, Axl Low, I-No, Faust, Slayer, and Zato-1 return from previous installments, while one new character, Bedman, has been added. The game also features a new boss character known as Ramlethal Valentine, who was added to the playable roster in arcades via an update. Additionally, the console versions add Sin Kiske from Overture, and new characters Elphelt Valentine and Leo Whitefang, as playable DLC characters, bringing the total roster count to 17. The console exclusive characters Sin, Elphelt, and Leo were added to the arcade version along with balance changes on March 19, 2015.

The sequel, Revelator, made balance changes and added Johnny, who was non-playable in -SIGN-'s story mode, and a new female character named Jack-O' Valentine. Along with returning Jam Kuradoberi as a playable character, Revelator also gives Sign's newcomer Elphelt a darker look for story purposes. Another returning character, Dizzy, was also added to the playable roster as the result of a fan vote conducted by Arc System Works, defeating Bridget and Baiken in a close race, with a total of 32,990 votes. The new character introduced in Revelator, Kum Haehyun, who is non-playable in the arcade version, was announced as a DLC character for the console version. Raven from Guilty Gear 2: Overture is the last of the six new additions to the Revelator sequel.

Baiken, on the other hand, returned as playable in an updated version of Revelator, titled Rev 2, followed by a new character who is a chief officer of Chipp Zanuff, Answer.

== Development ==
The idea of a new Guilty Gear entry came about in 2008, but production had only started in 2011. By mid-2012, development of the game that would later be known as Guilty Gear Xrd Sign progressed to a full-scale production that concluded in 2013, handled by a 25-member team in Arc System Works under the codename "Team Red". Series creator Daisuke Ishiwatari returned to direct the project. The team opted to use Unreal Engine 3 because of several factors they believed helped their workflow; the low price, the ease at which non-programmers could edit projects directly, and development tools for home consoles enabled them to release the title on PlayStation consoles. Ishiwatari aimed to make the game as accessible as possible to newcomers, intending for Xrd to be a new start on the franchise, (Note: Game artist Junya Christopher Motomura described it as a reboot.) Because initial development was constrained on time and budgeting, Ishiwatari had to carefully choose which characters would be included in the initial roster for the launch, knowing he would be able to expand it later. The deciding factors that led to the initial roster involved the gameplay variety each character added, their role in the story, popularity and balance.

The first trailer was shown to the public during the annual Arc System Works Festival on May 19, 2013. It demonstrated 3D cel-shaded models and environments, replacing the traditional 2D sprites that had been previously common for the series. The game was expected to be visually impacting, as a way to attract new players and because of Ishiwatari's assumption that it was a fundamental factor to the success of games like Street Fighter 2 and Virtua Fighter 2. The use of extensive 3D cutaways, which game artist Junya Christopher Motomura said gave "a more dramatic perspective", were added to characters' special moves to showcase their work. These cutaways were achieved because the team pursued 3D technology while keeping the game as a 2D fighter, having to use mesh rendering for backgrounds and special effects (though they did keep some aspects as 2D, such as cutscene backgrounds and distant characters). The announcement was well-received, and allowed Arc System Works to develop Dragon Ball FighterZ and other third-party-based fighting games, including its sequel Guilty Gear Strive in the same style while upgrading it to Unreal Engine 4.

The team intended to design the characters as closely as possible to anime using Softimage. In order to ensure stylistic continuity, they used methods uncommon in 3D rendering to keep the artist's intentions and give the impression that it was hand-drawn. When rendering, each character's shaders ignored environment lighting because it revealed the polygonal format that the artists worked to avoid. Character models used between 400 and 600 bones that encouraged it to scale illogically, as the team discovered some poses and shots could not be achieved with perspective alone. The artists deliberately cut frames to keep the feel of standard animation (similar to the sprites used for previous Guilty Gear games), and encountered issues with Unreal Engine's handling of the Cartesian X, Y, and Z axes, which could not allow modification of a single axis. The artists chose to use swappable parts instead of having to scale down or deform a single model, giving the character more movement variety. The staff also encountered problems with overlapping characters intersecting each other, which they solved by moving characters on the Z-axis.

== Release ==
The first game in the Xrd series, called Guilty Gear Xrd Sign, was released in Japanese arcades on February 20, 2014, on the Sega RingEdge 2 arcade board with support for the ALL.Net P-ras MULTI Ver.2 system. The game's port to the PlayStation branch was first available in November 2014 through a demo version released on PlayStation Plus for PS4. On December 4 of the same year, it was released both for PS4 and PS3. The PS3 and PS4 versions were released in North America by Aksys Games on December 16, 2014. It was followed by a North America-exclusive limited edition also released for PS3 and PS4 on December 23. (Note: This edition was accompanied by a replica of "The Backyard", an alternate world in the form of a book in the Guilty Gear universe, a Sol Badguy's keychain, a replica of Sol's belt buckle, an art book with characters profile from Guilty Gear Xrd, Guilty Gear XX Accent Core Plus and Guilty Gear 2: Overture, and a ten vocal-tracks soundtrack arranged by Ishiwatari. From April 2015, Askys announced that the limited edition would also grant a Guilty Gear Xrd T-shirt.) In Europe, it was only digitally released by Sony Computer Entertainment through PSN on June 3, 2015. On December 9, 2015, a Microsoft Windows port of the game was released via Steam.

An updated sequel to Sign called Guilty Gear Xrd Revelator was announced for the third quarter of 2015 for release on arcades, starting at a test location in June. It was released for Japanese arcades on August 25, 2015. In September, Arc System Works announced a port to PS3 and PS4 whose trailer would be exhibited at the Tokyo Game Show later that month. Aksys Games announced its North American release to coincide with the Japanese release in the second quarter of 2016. However, the English voice option is not included.

To prepare for the release of Guilty Gear Strive, Arc System Works posted the entirety of the Guilty Gear Xrd Story Mode (both Sign and Revelator, including the three After Story scenarios in Rev 2) with Japanese voices in Sign and English subtitles, alongside captions in Japanese, English, Simplified Chinese, Traditional Chinese and Korean on YouTube, with one chapter of the story posted each day from October 12 to November 2, 2020. On September 25, 2022, Arc System Works announced that Guilty Gear Xrd Revelator and Guilty Gear Xrd Rev 2 would have their online modes updated to use rollback netcode, with public tests scheduled for late October.

== Reception ==
Reception

Aggregate score
Aggregator	Score
Metacritic	PS4: 84/100; PC: 84/100; PS4 (REVELATOR): 86/100; PS4 (REV 2): 86/100

Review scores
Publication	Score
Destructoid	9/10
Edge	9/10
Electronic Gaming Monthly	8.5/10
Famitsu	(SIGN) 35/40 (REVELATOR) 37/40 (REV 2) 36/40
GamesRadar+	3.5/5
GamesTM	8/10
GameTrailers	8.5/10
Hardcore Gamer	4/5
IGN	8.5/10
Joystiq	3.5/5
Play	93%
USgamer	4.5/5
Paste	9/10

Award
Publication	Award
Giant Bomb	Best-looking Game

The game has received generally favorable reviews, holding a Metacritic score of 84 based on 33 critics; for 2014, it was the 16th best rated game for PS4 and the 131st overall in the site. Giant Bomb staff chose the game as the Best-Looking Game of 2014, praising the "crazy polygonal anime madness" and highlighting the camera capacity of "revealing the game's true nature" when it revolves around the scene during a special move. Geoffrey Thew of Hardcore Gamer elected it the third best game of 2014, commenting that "The characters are as vibrant and wonderful as we've come to expect from the company, and the new graphics are beyond gorgeous ... but it's the fighting mechanics that really steal the show." It was also nominated for Best Fighting Game of the Year at the 18th Annual D.I.C.E. Awards, Game Critics Awards, Hardcore Gamer Awards, and IGN Awards, but lost to Super Smash Bros. for Wii U in all four. In 2015, Guilty Gear Xrd Sign was nominated for Best Fighting game at The Game Awards 2015, but lost to Mortal Kombat X.

The game has been unanimously praised for its visuals; Electronic Gaming Monthly's Eric L. Patterson complimented it saying "this is the most impressive ... fighting game I've even seen (or played) when it comes to the graphics on display," while Earnest Cavalli of Engadget declared that "[f]rom a purely aesthetic standpoint," Guilty Gear Xrd Sign is "faultless." Other very praised aspect was its accessibility, attributed to its equally praised tutorials. Darry Husky of IGN asserted, "Guilty Gear Xrd does an admirable job of making it all accessible not only for those of us making the jump from other fighting games, but for those checking the genre out for the very first time."

GamesTM was disappointed by the game content-wise, citing the few modes and the "pointless" story mode. Cavalli commented Guilty Gear Xrd Sign's "biggest flaw, however, is that it offers players a vibrant world in which they have relatively little to do." James Kozanitis of Hardcore Gamer called the story mode the game's Achilles heel, while Ben Moore of GameTrailers bemoaned, "It's so full of cliches and caricatures that it's difficult to sit through." Thomas Morgan of Eurogamer considered both arcade and story mode animations skippable. Aevee Bee of Paste was more positive, declaring "given the structure of other fight games stories I'd much rather just watch this". The limited roster of characters was also another major point of criticism; Chris Carter of Destructoid also thought the roster to be small, but asserted characters are unique enough to make it good. Similarly, Maxwell McGee from GamesRadar lamented the "several painful absences" but stated new characters "help fill in these vacancies." Conversely, Moore stated, "despite the high level of quality, the cast still feels rather lean."

The cross-play between the PS3 and PS4 was praised by Carter, and was called "a welcome addition" by Husky. Moore commended the "competent, if not exceptional" online mode, while Morgan said it "makes the best of each connection I've had online". Patterson labelled it "absolutely competent—if not a little underachieving" but complained that it had not the lobby interfaces that BlazBlue or Persona 4 Arena had. Moore noted it was "far too many steps for such a simple thing." Kozanitis praised the online mode, saying it "runs sweet as a nut." The matchmaking lobbies were highly criticized; Cavalli wrote it "feels like a relic from 2005" for it: "It's a total crapshoot, and the game's weak, pre-set communication options don't make things any easier." Mike Williams of USGamer said it "feels like a step backwards" and asserted that "it's a shame, because with a better online system, Guilty Gear Xrd could've been the best of the best."

Cavalli was the most negative reviewer: "For all its good looks, [Guilty Gear Xrd Sign] is ultimately disappointing. What the game does, it does very well, but the sum total feels lacking. Had [Guilty Gear Xrd Sign] been released 10 years ago, its shortfalls could have been ignored in the face of tight gameplay mechanics and lovely graphics, but in 2014 the game just seems antiquated." However, in overall critics were favorable on their conclusions; it has been described as "the installment fans have been waiting for" by Kozanitis, and "a triumphant, long-awaited return for this venerable fighting game franchise" by Husky. The latter opined that "Xrd has enough new features and mechanics to feel like a true sequel, while excellently retaining many of the classic elements that impart the good old feeling of a Guilty Gear game." Morgan affirmed it is "among the PS4's best presented games to date, and a real highlight of the series." McGee stated, "Taken as a whole, Guilty Gear Xrd Sign is a strong - yet unsurprising - fighting game."

During the 20th Annual D.I.C.E. Awards, the Academy of Interactive Arts & Sciences nominated the expansion Revelator for "Fighting Game of the Year". The Rev 2 edition was nominated for "Game, Franchise Fighting" at the 17th Annual National Academy of Video Game Trade Reviewers Awards. In 2019, Game Informer ranked it as the 8th best fighting game of all time.

== Other media ==
On April 14, 2014, Arc System Works released an extended play containing the arcade opening and ending themes, "Heavy Day" and "Lily", both in regular and karaoke versions. An original four-disc soundtrack containing 73 tracks was released by Arc System Works on March 26, 2015. Other related media released include an arcade stick, action figures, key chains, and mug illustrations.
