= Guilty Gear X2 =

2002 video game

- Japanese PlayStation 2 cover art, featuring I-No
- Developer: Arc System Works
- Publisher: Sammy Studios
- Director: Kohei Takaoka
- Producers: Koki Sadamori; Shigeyuki Sakakibara
- Composers: Daisuke Ishiwatari; Koichi Seiyama
- Series: Guilty Gear
- Platforms: Arcade, PlayStation 2
- Release: May 23, 2002: Arcade; JP: May 23, 2002 PlayStation 2; JP: December 12, 2002; NA: February 4, 2003; EU: March 7, 2003
- Genre: Fighting game
- Modes: Single-player, multiplayer
- Arcade system: Sega NAOMI

Guilty Gear X2, also known as Guilty Gear XX (Note: Japanese: ギルティギア イグゼクス, Hepburn: Giruti Gia Iguzekusu) and subtitled The Midnight Carnival in Japan, is a fighting game developed by Arc System Works and published by Sammy Studios. The third main installment of the Guilty Gear series, Guilty Gear X2 furthered the plot of the series, as well as introduced new characters and gameplay mechanics. A sequel to Guilty Gear X, it was announced in January 2002, and was released on May 23, 2002, for the arcades. It was later ported to the PlayStation 2 and published in North America and Europe.

The PlayStation 2 version of Guilty Gear X2 sold well in Japan; over 140,000 copies were sold between 2002 and 2004. In addition to the public reception, the game has been praised by video game critics. Several aspects were commended, the most noticeable being its gameplay, visuals, music, and new additions from Guilty Gear X. Some called it the best title of the series, of the year, and even one of the best fighting games of all time. Since its release, it has received five updated versions, each offering additional features over the previous versions.

== Gameplay ==
The fighting system works around a five attack button configuration, including a new Dust button. Additional buttons allow the player to perform taunts, and throw enemies in the air. When a character causes damage or moves toward its adversary, a tension gauge charges. However, when a character moves backwards or uses defensive moves often, its tension gauge is reduced. Once a character's gauge is filled super moves called Overdrive Attacks, or a variety of special techniques—"Instant Kill", "Faultless Defense," "Dead Angle Attacks" or "Roman Cancels"—can be performed.

Guilty Gear X2 adds a new feature to the series: a burst gauge, which is filled as the player causes or receives damage. This allows access to the Psyche Burst, an attack that can be performed even while the character is reeling from the enemy's strikes. It allows the player to break combinations and super moves in the middle of the opponent's offensive. Also, when used under specific conditions, if the blast hits the adversary, the tension gauge is filled to its maximum capacity immediately.

Guilty Gear X2 offers eight modes: Arcade, Survival, M.O.M. (an acronym for Medal of Millionaires), Mission, Story, Training, Versus 2P and Versus CPU. The Arcade Mode allows the player to fight against several enemies until reach the final fight against the boss. On the Survival Mode, the player continuously battle against enemies until they reach the 500th and final level or die, whichever comes first. Medal of Millionaires is a variation in which the player earn medals by performing combos. In the Mission Mode, there are 50 challenges, in which the player fights with and against a predetermined character; the player character has handicaps such as being prevented from jumping, being poisoned, or starting a fight with half of health.

The Story Mode reveals the game's plot through battles interleaved with conversations between the player character and their enemies. The story varies depending on the player's choice and performance in battles; there is a total of 60 possible endings. The Training Mode allows the player to learn attacks by fighting a customizable CPU enemy. Two players can play in the Versus 2P, and on the Versus CPU the player fights against an AI-controlled character. In addition to those modes, there is a gallery with artworks, character endings, and cutscenes that are unlocked by playing Arcade, Mission and Story Mode.

== Synopsis ==
=== Plot ===
The story picks up approximately two weeks after the events of Guilty Gear X. In the time following Dizzy's disappearance, the mysterious Post-War Administration Bureau begins secretly investigating the Gears and fighters from previous tournaments for their own needs and ambitions. To achieve their goals the organization has created several mechanical copies of Ky Kiske, the “Robo-Kys”. In addition, fighters find themselves in a reality beyond their control, most notably in the manipulative hands of the villainess I-No, who is revealed to be a servant of “That Man”, the creator of the Gears. Each character provides a different ending to Guilty Gear X2.

=== Characters ===
Guilty Gear X2 features twenty-three playable characters; twenty of them are available from outset, with Justice, Kliff Undersn, and Robo-Ky as unlockable secret characters. In addition to the return of all Guilty Gear X's roster—Sol Badguy, Ky Kiske, Johnny, May, Chipp Zanuff, Potemkin, Baiken, Axl Low, Faust, Anji Mito, Jam Kuradoberi, Dizzy, Testament, Zato-1, Millia Rage, Venom—there are four new characters: Bridget, Zappa, Slayer, and the aforementioned I-No.

== Development and release ==
In January 2002, Sammy Studios had announced that a Guilty Gear X spin-off, titled Guilty Gear XX, would be released in arcades on the Sega NAOMI system in the spring of that year; it was released on May 23, 2002. Its porting to the PlayStation 2 was speculated in late August, with release date set to autumn in Japan, which was later confirmed by Sammy in the same month. In the following month it was shown at Tokyo Game Show, and it was published on December 12, 2002, in Japan. In October, the game North American release was set to happen in the first quarter of 2003; it was retitled Guilty Gear X2. An announcement in November confirmed its release date as February 4, 2003; in January 2003, Sammy created a website to promote its release. The European branch of Sammy released the game on March 7, 2003. On February 26, 2004, it was rereleased in Japan under the low-budget label "PlayStation2 the Best".

=== Updated versions ===
Guilty Gear X2 was followed by five updated versions of it.

- Guilty Gear X2 #Reload, first released on March 26, 2003, in the Japanese arcades, was later ported to Xbox, Windows, and PlayStation Portable (PSP) in 2004 and 2005. The Xbox port was published in North America in 2004, while it was released for PS2, Xbox, and Windows in Europe.
- Guilty Gear XX Slash, first released on September 28, 2005, for the arcades in Japan, was also released for the PS2 in the following year.
- Guilty Gear XX Accent Core, first released to Japanese arcades on December 20, 2006, was published for the PS2 and Nintendo Wii in 2007. While in North America both the PS2 and Wii versions were released, in Europe and Australasia only the Wii version was available.
- Guilty Gear XX Accent Core Plus, first released in Japan on March 27, 2008, for the PS2, was followed by a PSP version. In North America and Europe, both PS2 and PSP versions were released, and also a Wii port. Xbox Live Arcade and PlayStation Network versions were also released; the former worldwide, while the latter in Japan and North America.
- Guilty Gear XX Accent Core Plus R, first released on September 20, 2012, to the arcades, was ported to PlayStation Vita in 2013, getting releases in Japan and North America. It was released on Steam on 26 May 2015. In December 2020, an officially-supported fan patch was released, implementing significant improvements to online performance, improved online functionality, and improvements to the game's training mode.

== Reception ==
Reception

Aggregate scores
Aggregator	Score
GameRankings	86%
Metacritic	87/100

Review scores
Publication	Score
1Up.com	B+
Electronic Gaming Monthly	25/30
Famitsu	33/40
G4	5/5
GamePro	4/5
GameRevolution	B+
GameSpot	8/10
GameSpy	93/100
GameZone	9.2/10
IGN	9/10
Official U.S. PlayStation Magazine	4/5
Cincinnati Enquirer	4/4
GameNOW	B+
Gaming Age	A

Guilty Gear X2 was the 117th best-selling title in Japan in 2002, with 112,520 copies sold as of December 31, 2002. In 2003, it sold 34,294 more copies, amounting a total of 146,814 copies sold since its release on PlayStation 2 (PS2). Reviews were generally positive, with aggregate scores of 86.14% from GameRankings, and 87/100 from Metacritic. On release, Famitsu magazine scored the PS2 version of the game a 33 out of 40. The game received the maximum score from Cincinnati Enquirer, G4 TV, and Gaming Age.

Jeremy Dunham of IGN, GameZone's Michael Knutson and 1UP.com staff praised the multitude of moves; Knutson, however, said that it was difficult performing special moves, and 1UP.com affirmed "The real improvement, though, is the addition of more life-destroying options, like the hyper-addictive Challenge mode." Dunham accuse the fighting engine of being "too advanced for the casual fighting fan", also criticizing its "sucker" control scheme. Conversely, GamePro thought it "can be enjoyed by novices and veterans alike", and Matt Keil of G4 said it "is surprisingly accessible" to all gamers. Dunham cited how the "two-player mode allows for near-infinite possibilities and all the extra options are just icing on the cake." In contrast Kasavin criticized the other modes for not being as engaging as the two-player mode.

Dunham stated it has "incredibly attractive backgrounds, super slick animations, and the best character design on PlayStation 2." An Electronic Gaming Monthly (EGM) reviewer stated it has "cooler character designs on a PS2 fighter" whilst another said, "some of the coolest 2D game artwork ever." Official U.S. PlayStation Magazine deemed it as "the best-looking 2D graphics ever seen in a fighter." 1UP.com said, "the ultrasharp, hi-res character art and fluid animation keep XX at the cutting 2D edge." Dunham, Knutson, Keil, and GamePro commended its similarity with Japanese animated series. The reviewer for GamePro stated it "becomes an art form in its own right." Greg Kasavin of GameSpot, however, said "many of the moves in the game are animated so strangely that it can be difficult to see exactly what's going on."

Kasavin commented that its "cohesive musical style ... further helps set this game apart." Dunham deemed it as having "One of the best soundtracks to come along for quite some time", and praised Sammy for keeping the original voice actors, as did Knutson, which felt it "gives it a 'cooler aura'." Keil and Knutson found the sound effects to be "excellent" and "really great" respectively. On the other hand, GamePro described the sound design as the game's "major flaw." EGM remarked "Depending on your tastes, GGX2's pervasive heavy-metal cheesiness might negatively influence your opinion of the game."

Other features praised include its short loading time, the variety of game modes and characters, the balance between characters' abilities, the response of the controls, its replay value, and variety of features. Dunham even declared it "reads like the bible of fighting game options. Taking a page from every other title out there, there doesn't seem to be a single feature on the horizon that's been left out of GGX2 for fear of the Completists." In spite of the praise, other criticisms vary from its general difficulty to the lack of an online play mode, position of move list in training mode, and the difficulty to perform moves in Dual Shock.

D. F. Smith from IGN elected Guilty Gear X2 the best game of 2002, while GameSpot named it the best PlayStation 2 game of January 2003. It ranked fifth in the GameSpy's 2003 PlayStation 2 Games of the Year" with the staff saying "Guilty Gear X2 is easily one of the best fighting games to come out in the last couple years". In 2004 IGN's editors selected it as the ninth best "Hidden Gems"—fun video games with poor sales in America. Official U.S. PlayStation Magazine included the game on its 2005 list of the "Eleven Essential Fighting Games". In 2007, UGO Networks placed it ninth in their "Top 11 Fighting Games", with its staff qualifying it as the best game of the series. IGN cited X2 had all of the qualities previous games, but "in bigger quantities than we had ever seen", including it in the 28th place of its 2010 "Top 100 PlayStation 2 Games" list. In the same year, UGO also placed it 12th among the "Top 25 Fighting Games of All Time". Likewise, About.com placed it eighth on their "Top 10 PlayStation 2 Fighting Games of All Time", while Complex ranked it tenth among "The 50 Best Fighting Games of All Time", and included it in the fifth place in "The 25 Best 2D Fighting Games of All Time". Furthermore, The Escapist's John Funk called it "the best fighting game of the last generation."

The final revision of X2, Accent Core Plus R, maintains a strong cult following to the current day, and is still commonly played at fighting game conventions.

== Other media ==
=== Music ===
Guilty Gear XX Original Soundtrack (Note: ギルティギア XX オリジナルサウンドトラック, Giruti Gia Iguzekusu Orijinaru Saundotorakku), composed by Daisuke Ishiwatari and Koichi Seiyama, and arranged by Seiyama, was released on CD by Scitron Digital Contents on July 24, 2002. The album was well received by critics. Don Kotowski of Square Enix Music Online rated it 9 out of 10, and said it is "a well executed album and it captures the spirit of the game amazingly." Writing for the same site, a reviewer dubbed GoldfishX gave it a perfect score, and declared it "is no doubt a masterpiece". Comparing it to Guilty Gear X's music, IGN stated there was a "substantial improvement in the sequel's music", and said it "finally lends the tunes a little credibility" with better production, musicians and a live drummer.

Two live albums containing some of the Guilty Gear XX Original Soundtrack's tracks were released by Team Entertainment. The first one, Guilty Gear XX In L.A. Vocal Edition (Note: ギルティギア イグゼクス in L.A ボーカルエディション, Giruti Gia Iguzekusu in L.A Bōkaru Edishon), performed by A.S.H. and produced by Jay Gordon of the metal band Orgy, was released on May 19, 2004. In that same year, Guilty Gear XX In N.Y. Vocal Edition (Note: ギルティギアイグゼクス in N.Y ボーカルエディション, Giruti Gia Iguzekusu in N.Y Bōkaru Edishon), performed by Jason C. Miller, was released on September 23.

Guilty Gear X2 #Reload featured a Korean exclusive album titled Guilty Gear XX #Reload Korean Version Original Soundtrack. Composed by Shin Hae Chul, and performed by his band, N.EX.T, it was released by Team Entertainment on November 6, 2006. Reviewing the album for Square Enix Music Online, GoldfishX wrote "Guilty Gear XX #Reload Korean Version lacks the raw power of the Ishiwatari-composed Guilty Gear scores, but more than makes up for it with character and creativity", and gave it a score 9 out of 10.

=== Other ===
For Guilty Gear X2 and each updated version released, some strategy guides were released. Enterbrain released two encyclopedias for the original game, on June 22, and December 19, 2002. A Complete Guide (Note: コンプリートガイド, Konpurīto Gaido) was released by SoftBank Creative on February 5, 2003. SoftBank Creative also released guidebooks for #Reload, Slash, and Accent Core on September 10, 2003, May 29, 2005, and July 27, 2007, respectively. Enterbrain released on November 16, 2005, February 28, 2007, and October 30, 2012, guidebooks for Slash, Accent Core, and Accent Core Plus R, respectively.

Ichijinsha released three manga adaptations under its DNA Media Comics line. The three volumes of a Guilty Gear X2-based yonkoma series were released on August 24, 2002, December 25, 2002, and July 25, 2003, respectively. Based on Guilty Gear XX Slash, a two-part anthology series was released on December 24, 2005, and June 24, 2006, and a single-volume yonkoma series was released on January 25, 2006. Enterbrain also published an anthology series based on Guilty Gear X2; it was released in two parts published on January 25, 2003, and March 24, 2003, respectively.

A compilation DVD entitled The New Saint Glory with the highlights of a Guilty Gear X2 arcade national championship was released by Enterbrain on December 19, 2002. Enterbrain also released Guilty Gear XX: The Midnight Carnival Artworks, a trading card game series based on Guilty Gear X2 on September 26, 2002. In addition to the musical CDs, audio drama CDs containing original plots were released by Team Entertainment. Two CDs—Red and Black—were published on July 16, and August 20, 2003, while a second series, Night of Knives, had its three volumes released on October 20, November 17, and December 22, 2004.

== See also ==
- Umehara ga kimeta
