= Guilty Gear X =

2000 video game

- North American PlayStation 2 cover art, featuring Sol Badguy and Ky Kiske
- Developer: Arc System Works
- Publishers: Sammy Studios: JP/NA: Sammy Studios; EU: Virgin Interactive; JP: CyberFront (Windows)
- Designer: Daisuke Ishiwatari
- Programmer: Takashi Suzuki
- Artist: Daisuke Ishiwatari
- Composer: Daisuke Ishiwatari
- Series: Guilty Gear
- Platforms: Arcade; Dreamcast; Microsoft Windows; PlayStation 2 Game Boy Advance
- Release: July 19, 2000: Arcade; JP: July 2000; WW: February 21, 2003 (Ver 1.5) Dreamcast; JP: December 14, 2000 PlayStation 2; NA: October 2, 2001; JP: November 29, 2001 (Plus); EU: March 1, 2002 Windows; JP: November 30, 2001 Game Boy Advance; JP: January 25, 2002; NA: August 13, 2002; EU: September 27, 2002
- Genre: Fighting
- Modes: Single-player, multiplayer
- Arcade system: Sega NAOMI

Guilty Gear X, (Note: Japanese: ギルティギア ゼクス, Hepburn: Giruti Gia Zekusu) (Note: The "X" on its title is reportedly pronounced as "Zecks" and "Zechs" by Yukiyoshi Ike Sato and Justin Speer (both from GameSpot) respectively.) subtitled By Your Side in Japan, is a fighting game developed by Arc System Works and published by Sammy Studios. The second installment of the Guilty Gear series, Guilty Gear X was developed over a period of about two years after the first game's success. It was released in July 2000 for Japanese arcades, re-released on Dreamcast in December 2000, and later ported to PlayStation 2 in November 2001 and Game Boy Advance in January 2002.

Guilty Gear X continues its predecessor's timeline with new characters and gameplay features. A four-button game, its instant-kill techniques were weakened and a survival mode was added to the previous game's three modes. The Dreamcast and PS2 versions have sold over 100,000 copies in Japan; they have been praised for their graphics, controls and characters but criticized for their lack of replay value. The GBA version was the poorest-received, with the main complaints concerning ease and graphics.

== Gameplay ==
The fight system has a four-main-attack-button configuration: punch, kick, slash and heavy slash. (Note: The Advance Edition allows the player to choose between two control's configuration: a four-button and a three-button mode. In the former A is heavy slash, B is kick, L is punch, and R is slash, while in the latter A is heavy slash, B is kick and punch, L is to begin an Instant Kill, and R is slash.) Players may also launch taunt attacks, with their main objective to reduce the opponent's health to zero in a predetermined time. To win a fight a player must accumulate two points, with each round won earning a point. Guilty Gear X has features common in fighting games: combos, aerial attacks and counterattacks. A new feature is the Roman Cancel, which allows a player to cancel their move and its aftereffects to make other attacks.

The game has a tension gauge, increasing when a character causes damage or moves toward an adversary and decreasing when a character moves backwards or is stopped for a long time. When the gauge is half-charged a player can use specials called Overdrive Attacks, which cause more damage than regular moves. A full gauge allows a player to make an Instant Kill, defeating an opponent regardless of health; (Note: In Guilty Gear, an Instant Kill would end a match when hit the opponent but on Guilty Gear X it only earns the player a round.) if an Instant Kill is unsuccessful, the tension gauge will not charge for the remainder of that round.

Guilty Gear X's Dreamcast version includes four modes of play: Arcade, the game's primary narrative mode; Survival, in which the player fights through infinite levels until they are defeated; Training, which allows a player to practice moves with the help of an in-game move list and Versus, in which a player can fight another player. Guilty Gear X Plus also has art-gallery and story modes; according to the Sega website, the latter explains "misteries" which the Dreamcast version does not. The Advance Edition includes tag-team and three-on-three modes; each player chooses two or three characters, respectively, and can switch characters during a fight.

== Synopsis ==
=== Plot ===
In the year of 2181 (22nd century), less than a year after the events of Guilty Gear, reports of a newly discovered commander Gear surfaced. Amid concern about a second war, another Holy Knights Tournament begins; whoever captures and kills Dizzy will receive 500,000 World Dollars. She is defeated, but her life is spared by Sol Badguy, as she proves not to be a threat. Shortly after, she is found by Ky Kiske, the police chief of the United Nations and ex-chief of the Sacred Order of Holy Knights. He entrusts her care to Johnny and May, members of the Jellyfish Air Pirates, who welcome her as one of their own. Jam Kuradoberi, a bounty hunter and struggling chef, claims the credit for Dizzy's disappearance so she can collect the reward and finance her restaurant.

=== Characters ===
Guilty Gear X has sixteen playable characters: Sol Badguy, Ky Kiske, May, Baiken, Faust, Potemkin, Chipp Zanuff, Millia Rage, Zato-1, Jam Kuradoberi, Johnny, Anji Mito, Venom, Axl Low, Testament and Dizzy. Fourteen are available from the outset, with Testament and Dizzy unlockable characters. Guilty Gear X Plus adds three unlockable characters: Justice and Kliff Undersn, who returns from the first game, and Robo-Ky, an alternate version of Ky Kiske. The Plus edition allows a player to unlock gold versions of each character, who possesses a special advantage over the regular version.

== Development and release ==
After the success of the first Guilty Gear released on May 14, 1998 for PlayStation, Sammy Studios commissioned an arcade sequel in February 1999. Developed by Team Neo Blood, an Arc System Works production group led by Daisuke Ishiwatari, the sequel was about two years in development. Unveiled at the Amusement Expo in February 2000, Guilty Gear X was released to Japanese arcades on the Sega NAOMI system in July 2000. After the game's release, it was speculated that it would be ported to home consoles. Although the developers initially indicated that Guilty Gear X would debut for the PlayStation 2 (PS2), it was first released for Dreamcast on December 14, 2000 and re-released as part of a Dreamcast collection on May 23, 2003.

A PS2 version was announced by Sammy in June 2001 for release that fall, and Guilty Gear X was released in North America on October 2, 2001. Since it was released before the Japanese version, the North American edition did not have the additional features of the Japanese counterpart. Sammy released the PS2 version in Japan on November 29, 2001 and in Europe on March 1, 2002. In Japan, it was revised as Guilty Gear X Plus (Note: ギルティギア ゼクス Plus, Giruti Gia Zekusu Purasu), to add 3 new characters as well as a Visual Novel-like story mode. It was released in two versions: regular and deluxe, with the latter containing Guilty Gear-related special products. On February 13, 2003, the game was re-released in Japan as part of PlayStation2 the Best.

CyberFront released a PC version for Windows 9x on November 30, 2001 in Japan. Announced during an August 2001 convention at Space World, Game Boy Advance version Guilty Gear X: Advance Edition (Note: ギルティギア ゼクス アドバンスエディション, Giruti Gia Zekusu Adobansu Edishon) was released on January 5, 2002. It was released in North America on August 13, 2002 and in Europe on September 27. Guilty Gear X ver. 1.5, an Atomiswave arcade-system version, was released only outside of Japan in 2003 after its February 2003 introduction at the Amusement Expo. It is based off the original game rather than X Plus (Note: ギルティギア ゼクス Plus, Giruti Gia Zekusu Purasu) and only contains minor changes to the moves of some characters to make it similar to the already released Guilty Gear XX, with no extra content. 2020, a homebrew conversion of Guilty Gear X ver. 1.5 was released for the Dreamcast.

== Reception ==
Reception

Aggregate scores
Aggregator	Score
GameRankings	PS2: 80% GBA: 65%
Metacritic	PS2: 79/100; GBA: 67/100

Review scores
Publication	Score
Famitsu	DC: 31/40; PS2: 32/40
Game Informer	PS2: 6/10; GBA: 15.5/20
GamePro	PS2: 4/5; GBA: 3.5/5
GameSpot	PS2: 7.9/10
GameSpy	PS2: 87/100
GamesRadar+	GBA: 3/10
GameZone	GBA: 8.0/10
IGN	DC: 8.7/10; PS2: 8.8/10; GBA: 7/10
Next Generation	4/5

In June 2001, Sammy reported a profit of ¥284 million for Guilty Gear X's Japanese arcade version. In Japan, Game Machine listed the game on their September 1, 2000 issue as being the most-successful arcade game of the month. Its Dreamcast version was the 128th-bestselling title in Japan in 2000, with 97,934 copies sold from December 14 to December 31. In 2001 the game sold 33,822 more copies, for a total of 131,756. Guilty Gear X Plus sold over 128,000 copies in Japan.

Critical reception for Guilty Gear X on PS2 was positive, and has an average score of 80% on GameRankings, and Metacritic gave the PS2 version 79 out of 100. Greg Orlando reviewed the Dreamcast version of the game for Next Generation, rating it four stars out of five, and stated that "X marks the spot for brutality done beautifully." Anoop Gantayat of IGN called the Dreamcast edition "possibly the finest-looking 2D game ever, thanks to the high-res graphics, mega-ultra special effects and smooth animation." According to T.J. Deci of AllGame, the PS2 release is "notable for smooth, refined graphics, with richly detailed characters and backgrounds uncommon in 2D fighters." Although Guilty Gear X's overall graphics were praised, its sometimes-confusing backgrounds were heavily criticized.

The Dreamcast version's control responsiveness was praised by Gantayat. Guilty Gear X's PS2 version was also generally praised, with Greg Kasavin of GameSpot writing that it "controls smoothly and precisely". Major Mike of GamePro included the caveat that "some moves are difficult to execute and require patience to master fully." According to James Fudge for GameSpy, "The gameplay manages to be easy to pick up but isn't dumbed down enough to annoy expert fight fans." Guilty Gear X's limited replay value was heavily criticised; Jay Fitzloff of Game Informer said, "Since it's especially weak in the singles game, consider purchasing Guilty Gear X only if you and a friend want to go at it." The game was a runner-up for "Outstanding Fighting Game Sequel" by the National Academy of Video Game Trade Reviewers, losing to Dead or Alive 3. The PlayStation 2 version was a runner-up for GameSpot's annual "Best Fighting Game" award among console games, losing to Garou: Mark of the Wolves.

The Game Boy Advance version was less well received, with aggregate scores of 64.97 percent and 67 out of 100 from GameRankings and Metacritic respectively. A common criticism was that the game's artificial intelligence was inefficient in combat, making it too easy. Although Chet of Game Informer said, "The new modes such as Tag Match and 3-on-3 add variety, but still cannot compensate for this fundamental problem", according to Michael Knutson of GameZone its balance "gives the game a better replay value." Its visual were very criticized; GamesRadar panned Guilty Gear X's "overblown aesthetics", giving it the game's worst score (three out of ten): "While it's not completely hellish, it definitely deserves purgatory." According to Star Dingo of GamePro, "Most backgrounds seem like pale, watercolor imitations of the originals (you can count the colors on two hands)". Justin of Game Informer and Kaiser Hwang of IGN criticized the game's sprites, which they considered small compared with those of Street Fighter.

Its characters were praised as "original" by Justin and "cool" by Kasavin. Gantayat wrote, "It's the characters that stand out the most", calling them "marvelously designed," "unmatched in terms of fine details" and "very distinct." According to Fudge, "There's a character of choice for just about everyone." The characters' balance was praised by Tom Bramwell and Knutson. Guilty Gear X's audio had a lukewarm response; according to Chet and Hwang it was "weak", and Dingo called it "atrocious". Mike and Kasavin found the fight announcer's voice "unintelligible", with Mike also criticizing the game's "oppressive" music. Knutson praised Guilty Gear X's sound effects and music, and Kasavin considered its music appropriate for "the game's fast-paced action, as well as its anime theme."

== Other media ==
=== Music ===
Guilty Gear X's musical albums were published by First Smile Entertainment. Its arcade music was released on September 20, 2000 as Guilty Gear X Original Soundtrack (Note: ギルティギア ゼクス オリジナルサウンドトラック, Giruti Gia Zekusu Orijinaru Saundotorakku), composed by Daisuke Ishiwatari and arranged by Kazuhito Tomizuka and Yasuharu Takanashi. The album received mixed reviews. Don Kotowski of Square Enix Music Online gave it an eight out of ten: "The improved sound quality is a plus, as are the addition of new character themes, but some people may be put off by the fact that some of the new themes aren't as good as some of the older ones." Another reviewer, GoldfishX, gave it a five, calling it "possibly the most ear-grating, hideous sound I have ever encountered in game music" but not giving it a worse score because "Ishiwatari deserves a ton of credit for putting together such brilliant compositions on such pathetic-sounding hardware."

A second album, Guilty Gear X Heavy Rock Tracks: The Original Soundtrack of Dreamcast, composed by Ishiwatari and arranged by Koichi Seiyama, was released on January 17, 2001. It was well received by critics, with perfect scores from GoldfishX and Z-Freak of Square Enix Music Online. According to Goldfishx, "Even if you're skeptical about hard rock, this is something that everyone should experience in their lifetime. It's rare to have this type of heart-pounding sound without some form of vocals, but it's even rarer that the compositions reach this overall level of greatness." Z-Freak wrote, "Unless you totally hate hard rock, you MUST [sic] have this CD" and David Smith of IGN said that its music would either be loved or hated.

Three albums by the rock band Lapis Lazuli were released on May 6, 2001. Known collectively as Rising Force of Gear Image Vocal Tracks, the individual albums were entitled "Rock You!!", "Slash!!", and "Destroy!!"

=== Other ===
Enterbrain published several Guilty Gear X tie-in books. An encyclopedic strategy guide was published on July 26, 2000, followed by Drafting Artworks, which is about the game's universe, on December 13. Two novelizations, written by Norimitsu Kaihō and illustrated by Ishiwatari—Lightning the Argent (Note: 白銀の迅雷, Shirogane no Jinrai) and The Butterfly and Her (Note: 胡蝶と疾風, Kochō to Hayate)—, were published on January 20, 2001 and August 24, 2002.

A Guilty Gear X comic anthology was also published by Enterbrain on April 25, 2001. It inspired two yonkoma manga and an anthology, which were published by Ichijinsha on March 25, October 25, and September 25, 2001. A manga, Guilty Gear Xtra (Note: ギルティギアXTRA) with a collaboration by Ishiwatari, Norimitsu Kaihō and Akihito Sumii, appeared in Kodansha's Monthly Magazine Z on September 22, 2003. Based on Guilty Gear X Plus, a two-part anthology was published on February 25 and April 25, 2002 by Enterbrain. Ichijinsha published a yonkoma manga and an anthology based on Plus on April 8 and 25, 2002.

Battle for Saint, a compilation DVD with highlights of a Guilty Gear X arcade national championship, was released by Enterbrain on August 22, 2001. Two audio drama CDs with original storylines—Guilty Gear X Vol. 1 and Vol. 2—were released by Scitron on October 24 and November 24, 2001. On October 25, 2002, Terranetz released a collectible card game series based on Guilty Gear X.
