= Guilty Gear 2: Overture =

2007 video game

- Developer: Arc System Works
- Publishers: Xbox 360: JP: Arc System Works; NA: Aksys Games; EU: 505 Games; Microsoft Windows: WW: Arc System Works
- Designer: Daisuke Ishiwatari
- Series: Guilty Gear
- Platforms: Xbox 360, Microsoft Windows
- Release: Xbox 360: JP: November 29, 2007; NA: October 7, 2008; EU: September 25, 2009; Microsoft Windows: WW: March 31, 2016
- Genres: Action-adventure, real-time strategy
- Modes: Single-player, multiplayer

Guilty Gear 2: Overture (ギルティギア2オーヴァチュア, Giruti Gia Tsū Ōvachua) is a video game in the Guilty Gear series made by Arc System Works for the Xbox 360; unlike the previous games, however, Overture is not a fighting game. The fourth main installment in the series, Guilty Gear 2 makes use of 3D graphics, unlike its predecessors. A playable demo of Guilty Gear 2 featuring three modes of gameplay was released in Japan via Xbox Live on 30 October 2007. The demo describes the game as, "a mix between the action and real-time strategy genre." A North American version was released on October 7, 2008 released by Aksys Games. A port for Microsoft Windows was released on March 31, 2016 worldwide by Arc System Works.

== Gameplay ==
Guilty Gear 2: Overture uses an action-based gameplay similar to Devil May Cry and Dynasty Warriors while retaining special moves and animations that have been used in past 2D Guilty Gear fighters, combined with RTS/MOBA elements similar to Herzog Zwei and DotA, in order to create a new genre which designer Daisuke Ishiwatari describes as "Melee Action". Aside from the simple genre change from its arcade fighter predecessors, Overture utilizes a troop management system as well as certain points around each of the levels that can be captured and used as spawning points for troops. Various troops from the demo include the light infantry, capable of a special attack; Heavy infantry, capable of launching and juggle attacks; as well as magical troops which can heal and perform status increasing spells. To win, players must directly attack each other or each other's Masterghost, an immobile and defenseless 'main base' or spawning point for each player. Each time a player is defeated, they respawn by their Masterghost in exchange for a portion of the Masterghost's lifebar. Victory will be rewarded through: beating the enemy enough times so their Masterghost cannot revive them, directly attacking and defeating the Masterghost, or winning by basis of who has more life once a predetermined timer reaches zero and who has captured more Ghosts (territory points on the field that produce Mana) than their opponent. The game supports up to four players on Xbox Live or two players on the same console.

=== Servants ===
Servants obey their Masters to the best of their abilities and come in many different classes. Servants can be bought using the Master Ghost's Mana reserves but do not use any of the Master Ghost's energy. Servants can be used in two ways: players can even take Servants with them in Mana slots and re-summon them whenever they wish or they can be directed via the "Organ" sub-screen. Servants travel to their directed location and will attack any enemy servants they meet on the way. They can also take Ghosts and attack (but not destroy) a Master Ghost. Servants are unique to their Master's style and have different fighting skills per class (with the exception of Ky and Sin, whose Servants are the same).

=== Mana ===
The limitless source of energy, Mana (or magic) is used to fuel the Master Ghost. Masters can spend Mana to summon Servants, forge Contracts with new Servants and buy new skills and items.

== Story ==
=== Synopsis ===
The story takes place in the late 22nd century, in the year 2185, five years after the first Guilty Gear game. Sol Badguy is still free, but now travels with the young warrior Sin. Meanwhile, Ky Kiske, who is now the king of a country named Illyria, has learned of two shocking developments: first, the Gears that have been sealed away for many years are now beginning to vanish; and second, his kingdom is under attack by a mysterious force. Desperate, he sends out a "Wanted" poster with Sol's face on it, demanding he'd be brought to Illyria. Sol and Sin have realized that this is Ky's way of calling for help, and rush to the rescue as they find themselves surrounded by strange, doll-like women armed with giant wrenches.

=== Characters ===
- Sol Badguy
  Voiced by: Jōji Nakata

The prototype Gear and main character of the Guilty Gear series. He sports a new look, and 3D versions of some special attacks. Many people say that Sol's gear form is finally revealed but Sol's Dragon Install has evolved into having a form that resembles a gear when it is not his full gear form. In the game Raven discusses with That Man about Sol's Dragon Install becoming stronger as it evolves.

- Ky Kiske
  Voiced by: Takeshi Kusao

Sol's longtime rival. He has grown since the previous games and is now King of a place called Illyuria. He sports a new sword and 3D versions of his attacks. It is later revealed in the game that Fuuraiken is being used to help keep Ky's love (a gear) alive as she is disappearing from existence.

- Sin
  Voiced by (English): Yuri Lowenthal
  Voiced by (Japanese): Issei Miyazaki

A young man that accompanies Sol throughout the game. He uses a flag and pole as his weapon. Later revealed to be Ky Kiske's son, a quarter gear whose mother is the Maiden of The Grove.

- Izuna
  Voiced by: Tōru Furusawa

A fox spirit who was exiled to another plane of existence called The Backyard. He first appears as a voice in Sol and Sin's head when they are attacked by a mysterious new enemy. He teaches Sol about the new enemy (which also acts as a tutorial in the game) and later travels with Sol and Sin on their journey.

- Dr. Paradigm
  Voiced by: Yūji Mikimoto

A sentient Gear styled after a Chinese dragon who carries around a book of magic spells. Along with some fellow Gears, he was sealed away in a location known only as The Backyard so that Justice could not control him.

- Valentine
  Voiced by: Chie Sawaguchi

A young woman dressed in Gothic fashion, she speaks in a simple manner and wields a demented looking balloon named Lucifero as a weapon. She is searching for something called The Key. Valentine is racing against That Man so that she can reach an object known only as The Cube: an object that can only be accessed with the Key. Valentine is stated by That Man as being 'an exact copy of Aria'. Numerous other Aria clones were in production. She apparently has no will or personality of her own. Also interesting to note, is that her balloon, Lucifero, has bunched up strands of hair tied with a ribbon attached to the string - the color strikingly similar to that of Dizzy's hair.

- That Man
  Voiced by (English): Yuri Lowenthal
  Voiced by (Japanese): Tomokazu Sugita

The shadowy figure of the Guilty Gear series. No one knows who That Man truly is except for his servant I-No, but everyone knows one thing for sure: he is the "Gear Maker". In Guilty Gear 2: Overture he is there to test Sol Badguy's true extent as a Gear.

- Raven
  Voiced by: Hiroki Yasumoto

One of three servants to That Man. Little is known of him, only that he is an immortal who the more he is in pain, the more he feels alive. He became a playable character in the Japanese version only as of June 5, 2008, thanks to an official patch released on Xbox Live. In the American version, Raven can be purchased as Downloadable Content on the Xbox LIVE Marketplace for 400 Microsoft points (US$5.00).

== Release ==
The game was published in North America by Aksys Games on October 7, 2008 The game was released in Europe on September 25, 2009 by 505 Games.

The localized version features slight modifications, including having more items and the ability to be able to move while selecting servants or items. These changes were restricted to the single player modes only. The localized versions feature dual audio. An alternate costume for Sol Badguy was offered as a retailer-exclusive pre-order bonus. The alternate costume is now available on the Xbox Live Marketplace.

== Reception ==
Reception

Aggregate score
Aggregator	Score
Metacritic	X360: 56/100

Review scores
Publication	Score
Electronic Gaming Monthly	C
Game Informer	6.25/10
GameSpot	4.5/10
Official Xbox Magazine (US)	6.0/10

Reception has been "mixed or average". The Xbox 360 version has an aggregate score of 56/100 on Metacritic.
