= List of Solty Rei characters =

From left to right: Miranda, Sarah, Integra, Accela, Sylvia, Amu, Kasha, Celica, Rose, Solty, and Roy.

The following is a list of characters from the anime series Solty Rei.

== Main characters ==
Solty Revant (ソルティ・レヴァント, Soruti Revanto)
- Voiced by: Momoko Saitō (Japanese); Carrie Savage (English)
A Genuine Resemble (gynoid) with green hair and green eyes. She forgets anything from before her first meeting with Roy. After indirectly saving Roy's life (and then directly once again), she takes up residence with and is later adopted by him, causing her to take the surname Revant. Possessing a cheerful, helpful personality, she generally spends time cooking or performing housework for Roy, and later, Rose. She is naïve and takes every opportunity that presents itself. Her construction allows for a number of superhuman abilities, including high resistance to injury, greatly enhanced strength and speed, and the ability to resonate her fists to disintegrate objects. Her first name comes from one of Roy's old records, "Solty Rock".
It is later revealed that her real name is Dike (ディケ), one of the three core computers who oversee the planet, originally brought by the first human settlers. Originally, Joeseph described her as coldhearted whom instilled fear into people, but mentioned that Roy was responsible for making her smile. In the final three episodes, she also gained the ability to levitate. In Episode:24, Solty was sent into space to stop Eirene, another one of the three core computers, from intentionally colliding into the newly terra-formed planet (new Earth), which would destroy the city and its people. Solty was to destroy Eirene and the colonization ship before it could crash into the city. She fights her other "sister" in space and finally manages to get to her core. After Roy acknowledges Solty as his "daughter", she gains the strength to fight, screaming: "I am Solty Revant!!!" at Eirene, who refers to her as Dike claiming she cannot be a human; thus throwing her identity away as a machine. In the end, she successfully destroys Eirene and the colonization ship by destroying her core and in the process, disrupting the Aurora Shell.
Several years later, Roy and Yuto are shown in space searching through the debris. They detect a strange melodic, humming sound, which soon can be recognized as the song Solty learned from Rose. A bright light catches Roy's attention, and as he approaches it, he discovers Solty, who is still salvageable but has a heavily damaged left arm and right leg and has shut down. As Roy embraces her, she awakens and states that she wishes to go home.
Roy Revant (ロイ・レヴァント, Roi Revanto)
- Voiced by: Jouji Nakata (Japanese); Christopher Sabat (English)
Roy is a middle-aged bounty hunter described as grumpy and gruff. His wife, Sarah Revant, died due to cancer and his daughter went missing after the Blast Fall event. His top priority is to find his missing daughter, whom he believes is still alive. The only possession left from his daughter is her shoe. He works for a small agency under Miranda Maverick.
At the beginning of the series, he saves a Resemble girl whom he names Solty and adopts her as his daughter. Later on, another girl Rose Anderson, lives with him. He does not realize Rose is actually his missing daughter until he discovers that Solty learned a song from her that his daughter loved as a little child which came from an old record of his that was very rare. Even after reuniting with his daughter, Roy also proudly acknowledges Solty as his other daughter despite her being a machine, and realizes Solty must carry the burden of humanity alone.
Rose Anderson (ローズ・アンダーソン, Rōzu Andāson)
- Voiced by: Masumi Asano (Japanese); Colleen Clinkenbeard (English)
A vain, attention-seeking bandit who calls herself "The Blue Comet". She is honest, yet unyielding, proud, and selfish. Although she and her brothers donate their spoils to the Unregistered Citizens clustered in the city's underground and outskirts, they often cause large amounts of public damage in the process. She is armed with a laser-based hand pistol, and she rides a large motorcycle with three spherical wheels in front, driving wheels behind, and a cannon hidden in the frame. She occasionally hums the song "Return to love (Jazz version)" to calm herself.
It is later revealed that she is actually Roy's daughter Rita Revant (リタ・レヴァント, Rita Revanto). Her hair and eye colour had changed due to exposure to nanomachines from the Blast Fall. Having been adopted by Larry and Andy's father with no memory of who she was, she initially resisted the idea that she was Roy's daughter until later. She was supposedly killed in the collapse of a clock tower, but later, she was shown to be alive and working for Ashley Lynx, in order to follow their common dream of equality among residents. She was given a red and black Proceed suit. It also includes a jet pack, which allows her to fly. Solty eventually wore the suit in the final episode when she went into space. Eventually, she overcame Ashley's brainwashing to see the limitations and problems of her attitudes and dream. During the "Five Years Later" epilogue, she is referred to as "Representative Rita Revant" by a radio broadcast, indicating she attains a position of political power.
Miranda Maverick (ミランダ・マーベリック, Miranda Māberikku)
- Voiced by: Sayaka Ohara (Japanese); Stephanie Young (English)
Roy's employer and Kasha's foster mother. She runs the "Maverick Hunters", an independent bounty hunting agency. She is normally a very kind and laid-back person, but can be aggressive when necessary. Her husband was killed in the Blast Fall.
Kasha Maverick (カーシャ・マーベリック, Kāsha Māberikku)
- Voiced by: Natsuko Kuwatani (Japanese); Luci Christian (English)
Miranda's adopted daughter. She is pragmatic and slightly distrustful of others, but latches onto Solty and (eventually) Rose. Kasha forms an awkward friendship with Sylvia when they both stalk Rose and Ashley on their date. It is later revealed in the Extra Episode (OVA) that Celica's foster parents are her uncle and aunt. In the epilogue, Kasha is working as Rose's secretary.
Yuto K. Steel (ユート・K・スティール, Yūto K. Sutīru)
- Voiced by: Hiro Shimono (Japanese); Chris Patton (English)
A Resemble specialist in the city hospital. It is through his analysis that Solty's gynoid nature is first revealed. After being fired due to an accident during the diagnosis, he is hired by Miranda and moves into Roy and Solty's building. He is a stereotypical geek whose fascination with Solty annoys Roy and Kasha to no end. However, it is seen as being perverted, thus, he is comically beaten up by Kasha, Roy, and once by Miranda.

== R.U.C. Personnel ==
Ashley Lynx (アシュレイ・リンクス, Ashurei Rinkusu)
- Voiced by: Nobuo Tobita (Japanese); Jason Liebrecht (English)
A white haired, high-ranking member of the R.U.C. His original name is Locke. The left side of his face and torso, his left arm, and possibly more of his body are Resemble. He is one of the few surviving first-generation immigrants, and once supervised the construction of the underground city. While he is charming superficially, he holds ulterior motives for those who work for him, and ultimately has little regard for his subordinates. In the final two episodes, he was shown to have had a romantic relationship with a human named Illumina Kisch, who stored her final words in Solty to be conveyed to him. Due to injury from accidents on two separate occasions, he was repaired via resemblization by Eunomia, but was later killed by Eunomia after losing control of her.
Integra Martel (インテグラ・マーテル, Integura Māteru)
- Voiced by: Ryo Hirohashi (Japanese); Jamie Marchi (English)
The dark-haired leader of R.U.C. Special Security Division (PROCEED Team). Integra is responsible and level-headed. Her PROCEED suit is pink and can increase her speed to superhuman levels, but it taxes her to do this more than three times successively. After the death of her teammates, Sylvia and Celica, she confronts Ashley for revenge and challenges him to a fight, but he defeats her even though she was still fighting after she exceeds her expected limit of three accelerations. However, she doesn't die and later appears in a hospital with Accela. Her name is based on the Honda/Acura Integra.
Sylvia Ban (シルビア・バン, Shirubia Ban)
- Voiced by: Shizuka Itō (Japanese); Laura Bailey (English)
A hot-tempered blonde who has romantic feelings for Ashley. When Rose took over Integra's job as the leader of the PROCEED Team, Sylvia challenges Rose to a duel in their armour. Her PROCEED suit is blue and increases her strength. Later in the story, she confronts Ashley after she hears that Celica has been fired. Ashley consoles her before thrusting his resemble arm into her, killing her instantly. Her name is based on the Nissan Silvia.
Celica Yayoi (セリカ・ヤヨイ, Serika Yayoi)
- Voiced by: Yukari Tamura (Japanese); Kara Edwards (English)
A tanned, carefree sniper who works as long range support for the PROCEED Team. She is quite a laid back person who is very close to Sylvia and often teases Accela. Despite working for the R.U.C., she was an Unregistered Citizen in her youth until she was adopted by Kasha's uncle and aunt and raised as their own. Her PROCEED suit is orange, and contains multiple laser ports on the shoulders and arms. It also aids her sight, which is good in her position as a sniper. She has a penchant for slacking off and playing video games, but she does her job well as long as she gets paid. Later in the series, she rebels against the R.U.C. to avenge Sylvia's death but is killed by a sniper while confronting Rose. Her name is based on the Toyota Celica.
Accela Warrick (アクセラ・ウォリック, Akusera Worikku)
- Voiced by: Mamiko Noto (Japanese); Caitlin Glass (English)
A redheaded, shy, information specialist of the PROCEED Team. Accela is a good cook. She takes care of Solty temporarily after Roy yells at her. Her PROCEED suit only appears in the last 4 episodes. It is white and allows her greater computer network access. After her friends were killed at the hands of the R.U.C., she went on a maddened rampage by piloting the gargantuan floating vessel, Hilga, docked inside R.U.C. itself. During the rampage, she destroyed large parts of the city with Hilga's powerful hyper beam cannon. After hearing the conversation between Solty and Rose, she self-destructed the vessel in order to stop the hyper beam cannon from firing. She managed to survive, and later recovered in a hospital with Integra. Her name is based on the Mazda Axela.

== Supporting ==
Larry Anderson (ラリー・アンダーソン, Rarī Andāson)
- Voiced by: Hideki Tasaka (Japanese); Eric Vale (English)
The older of the two Anderson Brothers and Rose's elder foster brother. He has noticeably dark pink hair. He is the leader of the bandit group. While initially presented as an antagonist, he later acts as Roy's contact and informant in the series as compensation for taking Rose in as a roommate. He is injured while fighting off against a swarm of Resemble infected humans to allow Roy and Andy to continue on their way to deactivate Eunomia. He survives and later appears in the same hospital Integra and Accela were under treatment.
Andy Anderson (アンディ・アンダーソン, Andi Andāson)
- Voiced by: Tatsuhisa Suzuki (Japanese); Orion Pitts (English)
The younger, hot-tempered Anderson Brother. He has spiky brown hair. He is an expert in computer network and computer hacking. He is also very close to Yuto due to going missions with him and working together in the last episodes. It is later mentioned that he is in love with Rose (though with the knowledge that she was not his real sister).
Jeremy Kolbel (ジェレミー・コルベール, Jeremī Korubēru)
- Voiced by: Ryoko Nagata (Japanese); Leah Clark (English)
A young female researcher and friend of Yuto's. Jeremy was performing an experiment in search of new forms of energy, in defiance of the R.U.C. monopoly. Her experiment attempted to harness it from the Aurora Shell, but her experiment failed, causing the clock tower where she was conducting the experiment to collapse. She ended up injured in the hospital with guilt.
Joseph (ジョセフ, Josefu)
- Age: old man in appearance (has lived at least as long as Ashley)
- Voiced by: Fumihiko Tachiki (Japanese); Markus Lloyd (English)
A first-generation immigrant and former senior member of the R.U.C. who knows Solty's workings well. He had a dispute with Ashley Lynx in the past and become a passive observer of the world. After Solty is damaged by Ashley Lynx, he repairs her using equipment inside one of the original colonization landing craft, which was buried under the city.
Eunomia (エウノミア)
The central main computer of R.U.C. and one of the three core computers brought by the first colonists. Eunomia controls and regulates the water and energy supply in the city through its tentacle-like wirings. She is located in the lower levels of R.U.C. headquarters and serves as the heart of the city. She is also responsible for developing the registration system that separates humans in the city into "Registered Citizens" and "Unregistered Citizens". In later episodes, Ashley planned to take control of Eunomia by using Rose's PROCEED abilities to hack into Eunomia's main system. In response, Eunomia used the Resembles, who were linked to her by their implants, to go on a rampage and cause mass hysteria in the city. To end her havoc and to disrupt R.U.C. operations so they could infiltrate the headquarters, Roy put her into a standby mode by using the 'key' given to him by Joseph. Later, she was reactivated again and summarily killed Ashley for manipulating her. Eunomia was deactivated by Solty, who later reactivated some of her systems to keep the city running.
Eirene (エイレネ)
- Voiced by: Sumi Shimamoto (Japanese); Wendy Powell (English)
The third core computer brought by the original colonists, along with Eunomia and Dike (Solty). Eirene controls the migration ship, and has orbited the planet and supervised the city through Eunomia for more than 200 years. In the final story arc, she sets the colonization ship on a collision course to the newly terra-formed planet to correct human mistakes and to prove that she is still in control. She was therefore destroyed by Solty to avert the catastrophe. It's also revealed that she was responsible for the explosive nature of the Aurora Shell, to prevent humans from returning to the ship, and was thus responsible for the Blast Fall that happened 12 years previous. Her reason for doing so was because the remaining colonists on the ship had all died from a virus and she could not risk someone returning to the ship then returning to the planet carrying the infection.
Will (ウィル, Wiru)
- Voiced by: Takeshi Kusao (Japanese); Greg Ayres (English)
A young orphan and Blast Fall survivor who is living with Joseph beyond the outskirts of the city. He found Solty lying in the wilderness after she ran away from Roy, and befriended her. But due to severe injuries caused by the Blast Fall and poor treatment, he dies soon after their meeting.
Votre (ヴォートル, Vōtoru)
- Voiced by: Takeshi Watabe (Japanese); Brandon Potter (English)
A Registered Citizen who runs a fruit stand. He later befriends Mii after she stole from him. Since his wife and daughter died in the Blast Fall, he adopts Mii after Solty defeats Eirene.
Mii (ミィ)
- Voiced by: Miyuki Sawashiro (Japanese); Kate Oxley (English)
A young girl who steals fruits from Votre's food stall. She is an Unregistered Citizen and her parents died in the Blast Fall. Her hair is done to resemble Nekomimi.
Sarah Revant (サラ・レヴァント, Sara Revanto)
- Voiced by: Tomoe Ōmi (Japanese); Stephanie Wittels (English)
Roy's wife, Rita's mother, and Miranda's best friend. She died of an illness before the series began. In flashbacks, she usually hums a lullaby to Rita from one of her husband's records.
Illumina Kisch (イルミナ・キッシュ, Irumina Kisshu)
- Voiced by: Yūna Inamura (Japanese); Gwendolyn Lau (English)
A friend and co-worker of Locke (later known as Ashley) aboard the colonization ship. She was the overseer of the construction of the underground city and the terra-formation on the planet from the ship. She and the rest of the crew of the ship died from a mysterious illness. Her final act was giving Solty a mission of relaying a message to Ashley. Her features are exactly like Solty except a bit older and different hair color and style.

== Others ==
Dale Boyd (デイル・ボイド, Deiru Boido)
- Voiced by: Jin Hirao (Japanese); John Gremillion (English)
A bounty hunter mark who appeared on Episode:01. After the bounty was placed on his head, he was apprehended by Roy Revant. Later, he escaped from his prison with the help from Gray Walker, and the pair stole an R.U.C. security vehicle to take revenge against Roy. He is killed by Solty.
Gray Walker (グレイ・ワッカー, Gurei Wakkā)
- Voiced by: Tsuji Tsutomu (Japanese); Brandon Potter (English)
Dale Boyd's partner in crime. Both of his arms are Resemble that can extend at great lengths. He and his partner were both killed by lightning after Solty tossed them and the four-legged vehicle they were using into the Aurora Shell.
Meryl Tyler (メリル・タイラー, Meriru Tairā)
- Voiced by: Sawa Ishige (Japanese); Brina Palencia (English)
Solty's first friend, whom she met while shopping. Later, after seeing Solty's powers, she shuns her out of fear. Meryl appears in Episode:04.
Jack McLean (ジャック・マクリーン, Jakku Makurīn)
- Voiced by: Bunkō Ogata (Japanese); Mark Stoddard (English)
Condemned Prisoner no. 11467, Test Subject no. 4385. He was a 78% Resemble, which was achieved with the most state-of-the-art technology. McLean escaped from the research facility and was being hunted by the PROCEED Team. Although cornered by Sylvia and Celica, he managed to escape into the sewers. Later, he kidnapped Meryl, causing a confrontation between him and Solty which resulted in his death.
Dewey Black (デューイ・ブラック, Dyūi Burakku)
- Voiced by: Yutaka Nakano
Natalie Roman (ナタリー・ローマン, Natarī Rōman)
- Voiced by: Mami Kingetsu (Japanese); Colleen Clinkenbeard (English)
Hou Chuu (ホウ・チュウ, Hou Chuu)
- Voiced by: Hōchū Ōtsuka (Japanese); Mike McFarland (English)
A psychotic genius of explosive technology. He holds a grudge against Roy for intentionally destroying his right arm more than a decade ago, when Roy was still a police officer and mentally unstable due to his daughter Rita's disappearance. He set up several puzzles for Roy and Larry which include strapping fake bombs to a man, trying to detonate Roy's flat, and kidnapping Rose. He is eventually killed by several shots from Larry.
Vincent Greco (ビンセント・グレコー, Binsento Gurekō)
- Voiced by: Rikiya Koyama (Japanese); Brett Weaver (English)
An Unregistered Citizen who becomes one of Roy's bounty targets. Vincent stole P-1O crystals to sell on the black market in order to earn money for his daughter's Resemble operation. Vincent told his daughter, Rita, that he is her uncle, for fear that his status would take away her rights as a Registered Citizen.
Rita Revant / Rita Greco (リタ・レヴァント, Rita Revanto)
- Voiced by: Ai Nagano (Japanese); Monica Rial (English)
A New Rights Child who's living with Vincent Greco in the outskirts of the city. She's blind and crippled from the waist-down, disabilities she acquired from the Blast Fall. Vincent told her that he was her uncle, but he is actually her real father. Roy mistakenly thought that she was his missing daughter because of her name.
Kelly Jones (ケリー・ジョーンズ, Kerī Jōnzu)
- Voiced by: Tomoyuki Dan (Japanese); Barry Yandell (English)
John Kimberley (ジョン・キンバリー, Jon Kinbarī)
- Voiced by: Show Hayami (Japanese); Phil Parsons (English)
A murderer who killed Rose's best friend's family when she was a child. Rose eventually finds him and confronts him, but he proves to be more than she can handle, largely due to the laser deflector blades in his arms. Solty then rescues Rose and defeats Kimberley, severing one of his arms. Later, Rose tries to kill him with her motorcycle, but decides to let him live. After Rose leaves in Roy's car, Larry shoots Kimberley in the head, killing him.
