= Carrie Savage =

American voice actress

- Occupations: Voice actress; ADR director; screenwriter
- Years active: 2002–present

Carrie Anne Savage is an American voice actress. Her anime roles included Rakka in Haibane Renmei, Solty Revant in SoltyRei, the Mokonas in xxxHolic and Tsubasa: Reservoir Chronicle, Miu Fūrinji on Kenichi: The Mightiest Disciple, Hakufu Sonsaku in Ikki Tousen, Kaede Fuyou in Shuffle!, Nancy in R.O.D The TV, Penny in Crayon Shin-chan and Asta in Trinity Blood. She has charitable work in countries such as Africa, Mexico and the Philippines.

== Filmography ==
=== Anime ===
- A Certain Scientific Railgun series – Eri Haruue
- Angel Tales – Tamami the Cat
- Aquarion – Rena Rune
- Aquarion Evol – Crea Drosera
- Aquarion Logos – Karan Uminagi
- B'tX – J'Taime
- Babel II: Beyond Infinity – Meilin
- Baccano! – Lua Klein
- Baldr Force EXE Resolution – Ren Mizusaka
- Bamboo Blade – Satori Azuma
- Birdy the Mighty Decode – Marina
- Black Blood Brothers – Sei
- Black Cat – Saki
- Blassreiter – Maria
- Bleach – Mareyo Omaeda
- Boys Be... – Nao Nitta
- Casshern Sins – Sophita
- Chaos;Head – Rimi Sakihata
- Claymore - Claymore B / Awakening Yoma Girl
- Corpse Princess – Hibiki Shinjou / Hina
- Crayon Shin-chan - Nene Sakurada (Penny Milfer)
- D.Gray-man – Mei-Ling
- Daphne in the Brilliant Blue – Maia Mizuki
- Darker than Black – Meena Kandaswamy
- DearS – Nia
- Dragonaut: The Resonance – Laura
- Durarara!! – Mika Harima
- El Cazador de la Bruja – Maria / Iris Gonzalez
- Ergo Proxy – Dorothy / Monad
- Fairy Tail – Lisanna Strauss
- Fairy Tail: 100 Years Quest – Lisanna Strauss
- Fate/Zero – Shirley
- Fullmetal Alchemist – Lydia
- The Galaxy Railways – Liffle
- Gankutsuou: The Count of Monte Cristo – Peppo
- Ghost Hunt – Wakako Yoshimi
- Ghost in the Shell: Stand Alone Complex 2nd Gig – Tachikoma / Theresa
- Ghost Talker's Daydream – Ai Kunugi
- Girls Bravo – Koyomi Hare Nanaka
- Guilty Crown – Chika Arimura
- Gunslinger Girl: Il Teatrino – Aurora
- Gun Sword – Priscilla
- Haibane Renmei – Rakka
- Heaven's Lost Property – Chaos
- Hell Girl – Miki Kamikawa
- I's – Itsuki Akiba
- Idol Project – Kiwi
- Ikki Tousen series – Hakufu Sonsaku
- K – Kukuri Yukizome (Season 1)
- Kamichu! – Tama / Tohu-chan
- Kaze no Stigma – Tiana
- Kekkaishi – Aoi Shinagawa
- Kenichi: The Mightiest Disciple – Miu Fūrinji
- Ladies versus Butlers! – Selnia Iori Flameheart
- Last Exile: Fam, the Silver Wing – Millia Il Vech Cutrettola Turan
- Linebarrels of Iron – Risako Niiyama
- Liz and the Blue Bird – Meiko
- L/R: Licensed by Royalty – Eric's Girlfriend
- Magic Knight Rayearth - Mokona
- Maken-ki! – Otohime Yamato
- Marmalade Boy – Arimi Suzuki
- Melody of Oblivion – Sayoko Tsukinomori
- Mermaid Forest – Mitsue
- Moon Phase – Artemis
- Murder Princess – Ana / Yuna
- Mushishi – Akoya / Miharu
- Negima! series – Zazie Rainyday / Satomi Hakase
- One Piece (Funimation dub) – Kaya
- Origin: Spirits of the Past – Toola
- Ouran High School Host Club – Momoka Kurakano
- Paranoia Agent – Maromi
- Peach Girl – Sumire
- Pokémon: Black and White – Christie
- Pokémon the Series: XY – Heidi
- Puella Magi Madoka Magica – Junko Kaname
- R.O.D. the TV – Nancy Makuhari
- Ragnarok the Animation – Yufa
- Romeo x Juliet – Hermione
- Rumbling Hearts – Haruka Suzumiya
- Rumic Theater – Bride / Mitsue / Oda
- S-CRY-ed – Kanami Yuta
- Sakura Wars: Sumire – Iris Chateaubriand
- Samurai 7 – Honoka
- Sasami: Magical Girls Club – Itoki
- Save Me! Lollipop! – Nanase (Young), Sixteen
- School Rumble – Karen Ichijo
- Sekirei – Mitsuha
- Sgt. Frog – Angol Mois
- Shakugan no Shana – Chiara Toscana
- Shin-chan – Penny
- Shingetsutan Tsukihime – Satsuki Yumizuka
- Shuffle! – Kaede Fuyou
- SoltyRei – Solty Revant
- Soul Eater – Rachel
- Spirit of Wonder Scientific Boy's Club – Miss China
- Squid Girl – Kiyomi Sakura
- Stellvia – Shima Katase
- Strain: Strategic Armored Infantry – Jessie Iges
- Strawberry Eggs – Fuko Kuzuha / Toko Kuzuha
- Suzuka – Megumi Matsumoto
- Texnolyze – Ran
- The Tower of Druaga – Succubus
- Trinity Blood – Astharoshe Asran, Catherina (Young)
- Tsubasa: Reservoir Chronicle – Mokona Modoki
- Ultra Maniac – Nina Sakura
- Vampire Knight series – Rima Toya / Nadeshiko Shindo
- Witchblade – Rihoko Amaha
- Xenosaga: The Animation – Nephillim
- xxxHolic – Mokona Modoki

=== Films ===
- Case Closed: The Fourteenth Target – Tammy Diez
- Fairy Tail: Dragon Cry – Lisanna Strauss
- Fairy Tail the Movie: Phoenix Priestess – Lisanna Strauss
- Origin: Spirits of the Past – Toola
- Sakura Wars: The Movie – Iris Chateaubriand
- xxxHolic: A Midsummer Night's Dream – Black Mokona

=== Video games ===
- Armored Core: Verdict Day - Allied Operator / 20's Female Pilot, 30's Female Pilot
- BlazBlue: Cross Tag Battle – Celica A. Mercury (uncredited)
- Case Closed: The Mirapolis Investigation – Linda Hill
- Comic Jumper: The Adventures of Captain Smiley – Coco / Bradbots
- Crisis Core: Final Fantasy VII – Cissnei
- Disgaea 7: Vows of the Virtueless – Artina
- Dynasty Warriors 5 – Diao Chan / Xing Cai (uncredited)
- Dynasty Warriors 6 – Diao Chan / Xiao Qiao (uncredited)
- Final Fantasy Crystal Chronicles: The Crystal Bearers – Althea Sol Alfiraria
- Final Fantasy Type-0 HD – Additional Voices
- Muv-Luv: Project Mikhail – Haruka Suzumiya
- One Piece: Unlimited Adventure – Popora
- Phantom Breaker: Omnia – Rimi Sakihata
- Rune Factory: Tides of Destiny - Candy
- Smite – Scylla
- Street Fighter V – Marz
- Street Fighter X Tekken – Ling Xiaoyu
- Tales of Legendia – Shirley Fennes (uncredited)
- Valkyrie Profile 2: Silmeria – Dirna Hamilton
- Warriors Orochi – Diao Chan / Xiao Qiao (uncredited)
- Warriors Orochi 2 – Diao Chan / Xiao Qiao (uncredited)

=== Other ===
- Adventures in Voice Acting – Herself
- Running Man the Animation - Miyo

== Staff credits ==
=== Voice director ===
- Baldr Force EXE Resolution
- Ouran High School Host Club
- Sasami: Magical Girls Club
- Shuffle!
- Suzuka

=== Script writer ===
- School Rumble
- Shuffle!
- Liz and the Blue Bird
