= List of Hellsing characters =

The cast of Hellsing.

Hellsing is a manga series written and illustrated by Kouta Hirano. The series chronicles the efforts of the mysterious Hellsing organization as it combats supernatural and vampiric forces that threaten the United Kingdom. The series largely follows Alucard, a powerful vampire in service to the Hellsing family, as the organisation is faced with undead foes, a rivalry with the Vatican, and an eventual impending war with the rogue remnants of a Nazi battalion. Many of the characters in Hellsing were based on concepts from Hirano prior works as a freelance manga artist.

== Hellsing Organization ==
The protagonists of the series are the members of the Hellsing Organization, a clandestine British royal order led by the Hellsing family that is tasked with defending the United Kingdom from supernatural threats.

=== Alucard ===
Voiced by: Jōji Nakata (Japanese); Crispin Freeman (English);

Alucard (アーカード, Ākādo) is a powerful vampire in complete service to the Hellsing organisation. Alucard is violent, sadistic, and masochistic, taking a disturbing amount of pleasure in viciously ripping his enemies apart. He's also highly egotistical, taking pride in his abilities while looking down on both opponents and allies. Despite his methodical behavior, however, he strongly admires and respects humanity for their will to fight for their lives, something that he gave up on when he was a human himself, and he ultimately devotes his servitude to the Hellsing organization to protecting the innocent. Alucard is an exceedingly lethal combatant, even unarmed, due to his extensive supernatural abilities and strength. He is strong enough to tear a human body apart with ease and move faster than the eye can see. He can regenerate his body after taking any fatal damage, even if he was decapitated, split in half, or reduced to a pile of flesh and blood. Alucard can also shapeshift into whatever form he chooses. When he drinks his victim's blood, he can absorb their soul as well, obtaining their memories and converting said victim into an extension of himself known as a familiar. Other abilities include telepathy, intangibility, teleportation, telekinesis, and hypnosis. However, he also uses various weapons in battle. Weapons include swords, machine guns, and traditional vampire-slaying tools such as stakes and crosses. Alucard also has two signature weapons: a pair of intimidating, high-powered semi-automatic handguns named the .454 Casull and the Jackal.

=== Seras Victoria ===
Voiced by: Fumiko Orikasa (Japanese); K. T. Gray (English);

Seras Victoria (セラス・ヴィクトリア, Serasu Vikutoria) is a young, strong-willed, empathetic policewoman who is turned into a vampire at the beginning of the series and then serves as Alucard's assistant, dubbed "Police Girl" by Alucard. Often, she is at odds with Alucard due to his preference for bloodshed and her refusal to fully accept her vampirism. She acts as the viewpoint character in the series. A character similar to Seras, Yuri Kate, is in its prototype version, The Legends of Vampire Hunter.

In the series, Seras is originally a police officer who, with her squad, is sent to the village of Cheddar. A vampire has taken control of the town and turned its inhabitants into ghouls. When Alucard appears, she is taken hostage by the vampire until Alucard shoots both of them, killing the rogue vampire and almost killing Seras. Alucard offers to turn Seras into a vampire to save her from dying, which she accepts. Then, she assists the Hellsing Organization against the increased vampire attacks. After Millennium declares war, she and the Wild Geese defend against Zorin Blitz's assault on Hellsing Manor, killing off most of the vampire soldiers before taking on Zorin herself.

Seras' past is revealed during Zorin's illusion trap. Her father, a police officer, "gets in too deep" during an undercover mission. The group he has infiltrated traces him back to his home and brutally murders him and his wife. A distraught Seras charges and stabs one criminal in the eye with a fork. She is then shot in the gut and thrown against a bloodstained wall. The flashback ends with Seras seeing one of the criminals having sex with her mother's corpse. After having her arm sliced off, her life is spared by consuming Pip's blood. Drinking Pip's blood transforms her into a full-fledged vampire, with a shroud of energy replacing her arm. Pip becomes her familiar. With her newly acquired strength, she can kill Zorin. She leaves the manor and meets up with Integra, who is being escorted by Alexander Anderson and his soldiers.

She is later shocked at Walter's return as a vampire, seeing him as a father figure. Despite now being enemies, she thanks Walter for everything before boarding the zeppelin with Integra to face the Major. On the ship, she does battle with the Captain before finally managing to kill the werewolf. Later, she and Integra witness the evil Major's grand plan to kill Alucard as he disappears. She is then able to shatter the protective glass that shields the Major allowing Integra to finish him off. With the war now over, Seras carries Integra back to the remains of Hellsing Manor. In the epilogue, Seras has become Hellsing's highest-ranking vampire after Alucard's supposed death. After he returns, she is finally excited to be reunited with her master.

=== Integra Hellsing ===
Voiced by: Yoshiko Sakakibara (Japanese); Victoria Harwood (English);

Sir Integra Fairbrook Wingates Hellsing (インテグラル・ファルブルケ・ウィンゲーツ・ヘルシング, Integuraru Faruburuke Wingētsu Herushingu) is a 22-year-old noblewoman member of the Protestant Knights who is the head and last member of the Hellsing family, the Bureau Director of the Hellsing Organization, and the current master of Hellsing's vampire, Alucard. Integra is usually emotionally collected, rarely allowing them to get in the way of business. However, she is sometimes prone to fits of anger. The Hellsing family is "on a mission from God", and she values her duties to protect the United Kingdom and the Anglican Church above everything else. For her, failure is not tolerated, especially her own. She runs the Hellsing Organization with charisma and patriotism, and she is one of the few people who can stand up to the force of Alucard's personality and command his respect. As a child, she develops a deep sense of duty to Hellsing, not standing for anything that may threaten her or her organization. Being the first matriarch of Hellsing, she struggles to maintain respect from members of the Queen's government known as The Round Table who often question her judgment.

During the Valentine brother's invasion, Integra takes full responsibility for allowing the vampires to break into the Manor and personally slays all personnel who turned into ghouls because of it. After Millennium declares war against England, she and Walter flee from the attacking vampires with Walter hiding behind to allow her to escape. She soon meets up with Alexander Anderson and his men who reluctantly agree to accompany her through the city. After witnessing Alucard and Anderson's final duel, she is shocked to see Walter return as a genetically modified vampire. Integra and Seras leave for the Major's zeppelin, but not before declaring Walter an enemy to the Hellsings and ordering Alucard to kill him with no remorse. She makes it to the Major but is unable to kill him due to a protective glass wall shielding him. After this she witnesses the Major's plan unfold, resulting in Alucard's supposed death. After Seras shatters the major's defenses, Integra finally shoots him in the head, but he shoots her in the eye at that same moment. With the battle over, the two return to Hellsing Manor.

In the epilogue set 30 years after the war, a now middle-aged Integra laments about finding someone to take over for her when she dies. Later that night Alucard returns, having managed to regain his sense of self but with the cost of having to take a long time to do so. She offers Alucard some of her blood, welcoming him back after decades of his absence.

=== Walter C. Dornez ===
Voiced by: Motomu Kiyokawa, Daisuke Namikawa (Young Adult), Romi Park (Child) (Japanese); Ralph Lister, Liam O'Brien (Young Adult), Jessica D. Stone (Child) (English);

Walter C. Dornez (ウォルター・C（クム）・ドルネーズ, Worutā C. (kumu) Dorunēzu; alt. Walter C. Dollneaz) is a member of the Hellsing Organization who also serves as the Hellsing family retainer, a job that he has maintained for most of his life. His ability to use high-velocity monomolecular wires with incredible skill and precision earned him the nickname the "Angel of Death". During the events of Hellsing: The Dawn, Walter accompanied Alucard in the storming Millennium's base during World War II in Warsaw, Poland where they put end to the organization's first attempt at create an army of artificial vampires. However, due to his fears of being forgotten and The Major forcibly drafting him after witnessing his abilities, Walter became a double agent of Millennium within the Hellsing Organization's infrastructure in the aftermath of the war.

Decades later, Walter arranged for Integra Hellsing to unseal Alucard and make the vampire her servant. Walter carries on his duties as the current Hellsing head butler while providing special weapons for use by Alucard and Seras Victoria. Despite his advanced age, Walter can still fight his way through hordes of the living while helping Integra make numerous difficult choices when Alucard harms innocent humans in order to achieve mission objectives. While he appears to accept his age with proud resignation, it is a façade to hide his fear of being useless and desire to be a true Angel of Death.

Once Millennium begins its attack on London, Walter is retrieved by the Captain to be made into an artificial vampire to prepare for his fight against Alucard, being restored to a much younger form. Appearing while crushing what remains of the deceased Alexander Anderson underfoot, Walter slaughters Yumie before facing Alucard in a duel. During the duel, it is revealed that Walter's vampirism was hastily conducted as he lacks the ability to regenerate normally like the Last Battalion while also growing younger. Having regressed to his teenaged self and stating he risked everything to prove his worth against the vampire, Walter loses his chance as he is forced to watch Alucard fall into The Major's trap and cease to be after unknowingly absorbing Schrödinger. Entering the Hindenburg II after dealing with the vengeful Heinkel Wolfe, Walter kills the Doctor before being consumed in the inferno caused by the zeppelin's explosion. Walter's prototype was in Daidōjin Monogatari alongside Heinkel.

=== Pip Bernadotte ===
Voiced by: Hiroaki Hirata, Hiromi Igarashi (Child) (Japanese); Yuri Lowenthal, Karen Strassman (Child) (English);

Pip Bernadotte (ピップ・ベルナドット, Pippu Berunadotto) is a French man with an eye patch over his left eye. He is from a long line of mercenaries and leader of the Wild Geese. His ancestors were members in for six generations. While experienced with the AK-74 as his weapon of choice, Bernadotte can be a narrow-minded womanizer with a compulsive smoking habit. Bernadotte and the Wild Geese are hired by Walter after Hellsing's military is slaughtered by the Valentine Brothers and their Ghouls. While Bernadotte and his men initially refuses to believe in vampires during his first debrief, they are all convinced shortly after meeting with Alucard and Seras. Soon after, while flirting with Seras on a regular basis, Bernadotte supports Alucard and Seras during their mission in Brazil where Pip and Seras start to bond.

During Millennium's attack on London, Bernadotte and his men suffer losses as they and Seras attempt to defend Hellsing manor from Zorin Blitz's forces. Though already severely injured, Bernadotte tries to save Seras from Zorin before the Millennium member impales him. After finally getting Seras to kiss him, Bernadotte tells her to drink his blood to save herself by awakening her full vampire abilities. The act results with Bernadotte becoming Seras' Familiar as his memories enable her to resist Zorin's attack before killing her. Later, during Seras' fight with The Captain, Bernadotte makes his presence known as he advises Seras in her fight before manifesting from her body to land the deathblow for his Seras. Unlike others that have been turned into familiars, Bernadotte's personality remains intact as shown when he communicates with Seras, In the series' epilogue, as Heinkel hurts Bernadotte so the other Iscariot members can see, it is revealed that Seras has Bernadotte's function as the restored Hellsing manor's security system in the form of a shadowy mass covering the estate.

== Millennium ==
Millennium

Publication information
- Publisher: (Japan) Shounengahosha (United States) Dark Horse Comics (France) Editions Tonkam (Germany) Planet Manga (Spain) Norma (Poland) J.P. Fantastica
- First appearance: Hellsing volume 2
- Created by: Kouta Hirano

In-story information
- Type of organization: Post-war Nazi Remnant
- Base(s): Hindenburg II (Deus Ex Machina), Jaburo, Brazil
- Leader(s): Major; The Doctor
- Agent(s): The Captain; Warrant Officer Schrödinger; Walter C. Dornez; First Lieutenant Zorin Blitz; First Lieutenant Rip van Winkle; Tubalcain Alhambra; Luke and Jan Valentine

Millennium (German: Jahrtausend) is a fictional Neo-Nazi Paramilitary organization who serve as the primary antagonists in the series. The name is a reference to the "Thousand Year Reich" which Adolf Hitler sought to establish during World War II. Within the series, the group is initially believed to have started as a rogue group within Nazi Germany. The mysterious group pools its resources and manpower after the war and, with substantial help from the Vatican, is able to relocate to South America and go into hiding. The organization is led initially by a cabal of ex-SS officers known as the ''Old Men of the Opera House'', before later being executed by the Major and his followers in a bloody coup. Millennium's researchers discovered a way to artificially transform humans into vampires through mysterious means and begins sending expendable vampires to stage attacks across United Kingdom, monitoring them using implanted computer chips. Most of its members are monsters of some sort, or have found a way to prolong their lives. Millennium is shown to have considerable influence over institutions and militaries across the globe, having agents embedded within and using promises of vampirism and immortality to gain leverage over important figures.

It is later revealed that Millennium was formed during World War II on the direct order of Adolf Hitler as a project to weaponize vampirism, under the codename of the ''Last Battalion.'' The group discovered and exhumed the corpse of Mina Harker, as her body still contained traces of Dracula's vampiric essence. Millennium used her remains as the basis of their research, branding her as ''The Shi'' and treating her with almost holy reverence. Their initial research site within Warsaw was destroyed in 1944 by Alucard and Walter in an operation by Hellsing during the Warsaw Uprising, however its leaders survived and escaped, regrouping towards the end of the war.

Following the Major's coup, he declares war on Hellsing and the United Kingdom, intending to begin a global war without end and transports his forces towards England in a fleet of armoured zeppelins and uses embedded spies to attack military bases and government institutions across England, the United States and other nations, allowing his main force to attack unhindered. The series cultimates in a three sided war between Hellsing, Iscariot and Millennium in London. Shortly prior to their invasion, Rip Van Winkle's task force hijack a British Aircraft Carrier, with aid from embedded agents within the British Navy. Alucard is sent on an SR-71 Blackbird by Hellsing to regain control of the ship. After it is heavily damaged, Alucard rams the aircraft at high speed into the ship before murdering Van Winkle and her surviving forces. It is revealed that Millennium purposefully sacrificed her and her forces to bait Alucard onto the ship, trapping him at sea while they begin their attack on London.

During the Battle of London, Millennium heavily bomb the city using V1 flying bombs while their paratroopers descend. Their forces begin massacring and feeding upon the civilians and forces of London unopposed. As the battle progresses, Millennium's forces are slowly defeated. One of their Airships, the ''Alfred Rosenberg'' used by Zorin's taskforce, is shot down while approaching Hellsing's headquarters. The surviving forces are killed by Seras Victoria and the Wild Geese mercenaries as they attempt to breach the manor. An Iscariot unit led by Alexander Anderson, embedded to observe the battle, slaughter a group of Millennium's soldiers to save Integra Hellsing. Following the arrival of the Airborne Ninth Crusade led by Enrico Maxwell, Millennium fiercely battle them, losing roughly half of their fighting force. After Alucard returns and releases Level Zero under the command of Integra, Iscariot's Ninth Crusade and Millennium briefly work together in an attempt to kill the vampire. After Alucard releases his familiars and attacks, nearly all forces belonging to both are annihilated, many being impaled on spikes.

Following Anderson's death and Walters betrayal, the Major orders the landing of the Hindenburg II and offers Seras and Integra to enter and face him while Alucard battles Walter. During their battle, Walter kills the last of Alucards familiars, but misses his chance to kill the vunerable vampire, who then begins moving the blood of the three million dead in the city towards him to absorb it and replenish his strength and familiars. The Major orders Schrodinger to kill himself and throw himself into the sea of blood moving through the city. As Alucard absorbs the blood, now tainted with Schrodingers, the Major reveals to Integra that Schrodinger's paradoxical quantum state, now transferred to Alucard after his soul is absorbed, will cause Alucard to vanish from reality, as he cannot recognise himself due to the millions of souls within him. After Alucard's death, Integra and Seras confront the Major, who is injured by a shell and later shot to death by Integra. After his death, the flagship, damaged and burning, erupts and explodes, killing Walter, The Doctor and all other surviving members.

=== The Major ===
Voiced by: Nobuo Tobita (Japanese); Gildart Jackson (English);

The Major (少佐, Sturmbannführer) is the main antagonist and the leader of Millennium. He is a short, calculating and utterly ruthless Nazi officer whose unremarkable appearance and polite demeaner mask a psychopathic mind that delights in all forms of cruelty and carnage. He commands with a good-natured attitude, which can change in a moment to cruelty or grandiose elation. Through the intelligence Enrico Maxwell obtains from a corrupt priest he interrogated, the Major is believed to have been born between 1913 and 1914, putting him in his late eighties during Hellsing. The Major is shown to suffer an apathy similar to immortal vampires, but holds his individuality and humanity above all else.

As first lieutenant of the Schutzstaffel (SS), the Major was issued special order #666 directly from Hitler to create an army of vampires. This instigates the founding of Millennium, under the codename of the ''Last Battalion'' whose members use Mina Harker's body to perfect artificial vampirization. The Major first encountered true vampirism after being beaten within an inch of his life by Soviet soldiers during the Battle of Berlin. Similar to what happened to Vlad III, a demonic force offered him the blood of the battlefield, offering vampirism in turn for the Major rejecting his humanity. The Major rejects this offer, believing that the loss of individuality and humanity that comes with vampirism is something he cannot accept From there, assuming a different form of immortality by becoming a cyborg, the Major recruits Walter before he and his subordinates resume their work in South America. The Major then steps down as leader of Millennium, handing the reins to the Old Men while he and the Doctor continue their experiments. However, by the beginning of the series' events, the Major has altered Millennium's goal to be a means to start a war without end. After he and his vampire followers execute the Old Men for attempting to usurp their authority, the Major openly declares war on Hellsing and England as he brings the Hindenburg II to London.

Eventually, having waited for her to become a worthy enough adversary, the Major invites Integra Hellsing to face him. From there, the Major reveals his attack on London is nothing more but a formulated plan to end Alucard's existence. After his plan supposedly succeeds, an attack by Seras reveals the Major's cybernetic modifications. He explains he is still human because of his own will. He then reveals his hatred for Alucard comes from the fact that while the Major is a man who looks like a monster, Alucard is a monster who looks like a man. He believes Alucard to be an inferior being for having given up his humanity. Despite Integra shooting him in the head, the Major dies with a smile on his face, feeling content that he was the winner in the end. He also achieved his goals of a grand war and Alucard's apparent demise at the cost of three million lives. However, Alucard's eventual revival and the swift end of Millennium's war following the Major's death make it clear that his sacrifices were for nothing in the end.

=== The Doctor ===
Voiced by: Hiroshi Naka (Japanese); Marcelo Tubert (English);

The Doctor (or "Doc") (博士（ドク）, Doctor (Doku or Dokuta)), is Millennium's top scientist in the fields of physiology and technology, and the genius behind many of their projects. His name tag reveals his name to be "Avondale Napyeer". An unstable and eccentric genius, the Doctor and other Millennium agents dig up the body of Mina Harker, code named "The Shi", from her grave to create artificial vampires. The Doctor also saves the Major's life in the aftermath of the Battle of Berlin. He is also the creator of Schrödinger whom he frequently scolds. After the Major dies, the Doctor attempts to flee the exploding Hindenburg II (Deus ex Machina in the OVA series)to rebuild his research before being confronted by a dying Walter. Vexed by Walter accusing him of being a fraud, the Doctor attempts to detonate the explosive charge in the youth before losing his limbs and hitting the ground while dragging the curtain covering Mina's skeleton. Seeing Mina's skeleton, noting the woman's history and her possessing faint traces of Alucard's being in her bones, Walter says that all the Doctor has produced are mere imitation vampires for all of his efforts, before crushing the scientist to death under debris.

=== The Captain ===
The Captain in Hellsing Vol. 6

The Captain (大尉, Taii; Hauptsturmführer) is a character in the manga Hellsing and a member of the Millennium forces and the Waffen-SS.

The Captain is The Major's silent, stoic adjutant and bodyguard. Unlike The Major and Lieutenant Rip van Winkle, he still wears a full uniform throughout the plot, which is similar to an M42 Greatcoat with its neck-guard constantly turned up, and an M43 officer's cap emblazoned with the Totenkopf symbol. The Captain is a natural werewolf, able to transform at will and fight in either human, werewolf or wolf form. He is the second highest-ranking member of Millennium, but it is implied that he does not believe Millennium's ideology and merely wants to find someone capable of killing him.

The Captain possesses immense superhuman ability, even while in human form. This includes: superhuman senses, strength (strong enough to bend steel bars or shatter limbs with a single kick), speed, reflexes/reactions, agility, dexterity, flexibility, coordination, balance, and endurance. His iron-like flesh can withstand Walter's wires (which can easily slice solid steel), even as they are tightened around his bare neck. The Captain has some regenerative ability, able to regenerate mutilated limbs. Being a real life "wolf-man", he also has the ability to transform into white, fur-like mist similar to Alucard. In addition to his natural abilities, The Captain possesses two modified Mauser C96s with long barrels, and a combat knife though he never uses it.

His first chronological appearance was in Hellsing: The Dawn as a mysterious SS officer character fights a fourteen-year-old Walter C. Dornez as well as Alucard during a 1944 attack on Millennium's main research facility in Warsaw during World War II. He squares off with Walter and manages to resist his wires, then choke him into submission before the fight is interrupted by Alucard. Alucard, on the other hand, backs out after getting kicked in half by The Captain, and leaves Walter to fend for himself while chasing The Major. Later that year, The Captain participates in the infamous Malmedy massacre on December 17, during the Battle of the Bulge. He ultimately travels with the rest of Millennium to South America and remains in hiding for decades.

In the present storyline, The Captain is seen along with other Millennium members as they prepare for the invasion of England. As Walter and Integra Hellsing attempt to drive back to Hellsing HQ, Walter spots The Captain blocking the road and attempts to fight him. The Captain catches Walter's wires in his hands. Their duel is interrupted by the Major, leaving both theirs fates unknown for a time. Later on, The Captain leaps from The Major's zeppelin to confront Alucard with Alexander Anderson. He is surprised by Alucard's "counter-attack" and backs off for the time being. Afterwards, the Captain incapacitates Heinkel Wolfe by shooting her through her cheek as a warning not to interfere with Walter and Alucard's duel.

When the Captain confronts Seras Victoria and Sir Integra, who stormed The Major's zeppelin, he allows Integra to pass. He then engages Seras in a gun battle, which ends with him transforming into a werewolf. While in this form, he trades powerful blows with Seras and manages to avoid several fatal hits due to his mist-like abilities. Before he can kill her, Seras manages to stop one of his kicks by biting and holding his leg in her mouth, giving Pip Bernadotte (from within Seras' body) the chance to thrust a tooth with a silver filling from a concentration camp prisoner into The Captain's chest. The Captain then falls to the floor dying as a smile slowly creeps across his face.

The Captain is based on a character named Hans Gunsche in one of Hirano's older works, called Desert Schutzstaffel. Unlike his Hellsing counterpart, this early incarnation of The Captain speaks and opposes the Axis forces during World War II. He shows little enthusiasm for Millennium's Nazi traditions. While the other soldiers wear swastikas and address The Major as their Führer, The Captain's only badge of allegiance is the Totenkopf on his cap. Given that he is already a century old by the beginning of World War II, it is possible The Captain's motive for joining Millennium is to find a worthy opponent to be slain by, rather than the hysteria of the Third Reich that gripped Germany prior to the war.

=== Rip van Winkle ===
Voiced by: Maaya Sakamoto (Japanese); Kari Wahlgren (English);

First Lieutenant Rip van Winkle (リップヴァーン・ウィンクル中尉, Rippuvān Winkuru Obersturmführer) is one of Millennium's top soldiers and a member of the Werewolf special forces. While having the appearance of a youthful freckled vampire with glasses, van Winkle was alive during World War II, having gained immortality from her vampirism. She has a childish personality with a passion for Der Freischütz. She often sings arias from the opera while comparing herself to its lead character Caspar. This plays into her use of a long-barreled flintlock musket that fires magic bullets that can track her targets of their own accord by changing trajectories in mid-flight with devastating force.

In the prequel series Hellsing: The Dawn, while bearing the rank of Junior Warrant Officer, van Winkle encountered Alucard half a century ago. Though she eventually recognizes Alucard as an enemy, van Winkle is easily dispatched and develops a deep seated fear of him after The Major compares Alucard to Zamiel, the demon that eventually drags Caspar to Hell.

During the main storyline, The Major assigns van Winkle to take the VTOL carrier Eagle as a distraction for Alucard in what is later revealed to be The Major's attempt to strand the vampire in the middle of the Atlantic Ocean so Millennium can begin its invasion of London. After slaughtering the ship's vice-captain and his associates, van Winkle switches sides and orchestrates the mutiny of vampires. She then renames the British ship the Adler and paints a swastika in blood on the main deck while the members of the Letztes Battalion awaken. Though van Winkle is able to shoot down any approaching planes, Alucard uses a remodeled SR-71 Reconnaissance Jet to reach the ship and slaughter the entire Letzte Battalion. Despite a last ditch effort to kill Alucard, with The Major telling the Doctor to let her die a hunter's death instead of incinerating her as a rare gesture of "generosity", van Winkle is consumed in the vampire's shadows and becomes his familiar.

She later reappears as a familiar after Alucard releases his Zero restriction, merged with Tubalcain Alhambra while manifesting from their master's body. After helping shoot down Maxwell's helicopter, she is destroyed in a massive fire along with all the other familiars after Alucard is mortally wounded by Anderson.

=== Zorin Blitz ===
Voiced by: Yōko Sōmi (OVA) (Japanese); Hellena Taylor (Ep. 4) Rachel Robinson (eps. 5-7) (English)

First Lieutenant Zorin Blitz (ゾーリンブリッツ中尉, Zōrin Burittsu Obersturmführer) is a member of the Millennium forces. She is a tall, massively muscled female vampire character who works for the Millennium organization and is part of its Werewolf force. She is also the commander of one of Millennium's zeppelin forces. She is a formidable fighter, wielding a giant scythe with enough force to cut her enemies in half. The right side of her body is covered with tattoos which leave her when exercising her power of illusion. They flow from her body onto the walls and the ground around her, extending her influence over the area. She can also read into the deepest subconscious of a person's mind to determine the ideal illusion to use to torture them with.

Zorin attacks the Hellsing mansion during Millennium's invasion of London. The Major warns her not to underestimate Seras Victoria, however, Zorin does not take the warning seriously. As her forces arrive at the Hellsing Manor, they begin executing the members of the Wild Geese while the uses her illusionary powers to shatter their morale. She later faces Seras and uses her illusions to make her relive her parents murder. After cutting off Seras' arm and fatally injuring her, Pip Bernadotte attempts to save her but Zorin manages to fatally wound him as well. She finds herself facing the young vampire again after drinking Bernadotte's blood to awaken her latent vampiric powers. As a result, Seras becomes immune to Zorin's illusions due to making Bernadotte her familiar and thus his soul and memories are incorporated into Seras's mind. From there, Schrödinger appears briefly to tell Zorin that she has served her role well and that this is the end for her. Seras then runs her face again the manors walls until it is peeled to pieces.

=== Schrödinger ===
Voiced by: Ryoko Shiraishi (Japanese); Laura Bailey (English);

Schrödinger as depicted in Volume 4

Junior Warrant Officer Schrödinger (シュレディンガー准尉, Shuredingā jun'i) is a member of Millennium's Werwolf Squad who is a creation of the Doctor's. Resembling a young, teenage blond boy in a Hitler Youth uniform with cat ears and a perpetual smirk, Schrödinger shares The Major's love for war and bloodshed while serving mainly as his envoy for Millennium. Schrödinger shares his name and power after the "Schrödinger's cat" scenario in quantum physics, which allows him to be "everywhere and nowhere" at the same time, letting him appear at any location and negate any fatal injury through will and sense of self.

After the Valentine Brothers assault, Schrödinger is sent by The Major to appear before Hellsing during Integra's meeting with Iscariot and the Queen of England to deliver Millennium's war declaration and briefly flirts with Seras. Although he is shot in the head by Alucard, he reappears on the Deus Ex Machina ship with The Major shortly after. He also appears at the moments where Rip van Winkle and Zorin Blitz are killed in battle. Later, Schrödinger greets Integra and Seras as they enter the landed Hindenburg II, provoking Integra to shoot him in the head once again. However, he appears once again observing as Alucard was reabsorbing his familiars along with the fallen souls of London. There as part of The Major's plan to finally end Alucard by putting him in a situation where he must replenish himself with new familiars, Schrödinger cuts off his head. His corpse then falls into the blood, being absorbed by Alucard. His paradoxical blood "poisons" Alucard, as he cannot recognise himself due to his many faminilars, causing him to fade out of existence during the fight with Walter. Thirty years later, when Alucard has dealt with the millions of souls he has harbored, he gains full control of his powers.

=== Tubalcain Alhambra ===
Voiced by: Hōchū Ōtsuka (Japanese); Steve Wilcox (English);

Tubalcain Alhambra in the OVA

Tubalcain Alhambra (トバルカイン・アルハンブラ, Tobarukain Aruhanbura) is a member of Millennium who also known as "The Dandy" ("The Dandy Man" in the OVA), a tall and thin character who resembles a malandro archetype in Brazilian culture. According to the character descriptions in the Dark Horse version of Volume Four, Tubalcain is a First Lieutenant in Millennium. In a fight, he uses razor-sharp playing cards that can cut through anything or create illusions.

Tubalcain promises Brazilian police and military officers immortality by becoming vampires in exchange for killing Alucard and Seras Victoria, who were staying in a local hotel. Though Alucard considers the use of pawns to be cowardly, Tubalcain also plans to reduce the vampire's ammunition as he gets the upper hand in their duel. However, Alucard toys with Tubalcain before releasing his restrictions to level one while making use of Sera's distraction so he can attack Alhambra at close range. Alucard proceeds to cripple Tubalcain before absorbing the man's blood and soul to access his memories to discover Millennium's plan. Though the Doctor activates the incineration chip on Tubalcain, his soul ends up in Alucard's body. Later when Integra releases his control art restriction system to Level Zero, he reappears along with all the others absorbed by Alucard over the ages, with Alucard making him shoot down Maxwell's helicopter and attacking Anderson. He was destroyed in a massive fire along with all the other familiars.

=== The Valentine Brothers ===
Luke Voiced by: Takehito Koyasu (Japanese); Patrick Seitz (English);
Jan Voiced by: Kazuya Nakai (TV) Wataru Takagi (OVA) (Japanese); Josh Phillips; (English)

Luke and Jan Valentine are a pair of vampire brothers who work for Millennium as hit-men. They may have a long history in criminal activity while being presumably Americans. In the anime, the brothers are night club owners before their conversion. While the volatile, obnoxious and rude Jan Valentine (ヤン・バレンタイン, Yan Varentain) is a run-of-the-mill vampire armed with a pair of heavily modified, suppressed FN P90s, the calm and reserved, yet highly condesending Luke Valentine (ルーク・ヴァレンタイン, Rūku Varentain) is specially modified to have accelerated healing and speed with the use of a pair of sawed-off M1 Garand rifles, a curved bowie knife, and a Walther PPK concealed up his sleeve. With an army of ghouls in militant garb, the brothers storm Hellsing HQ. Jan manages to kill a large amount of the Hellsing forces until facing off against Walter and Seras. After evading the two he storms the conference room to kill Integra and the executives, but they all shoot him immediately after entering the room. After being incapacitated, he was incinerated by Millennium after his failure, with Jan using his final moments to reveal the group's name. Luke descends into the basement to kill Alucard for the sake of infamy as he believes he is superior to his opponent. But when Alucard removes his restriction seal over who he thought to be a worthy opponent, Luke is revealed to be unable to regenerate lost limbs and is devoured by Alucard's Baskerville familiar. During Alucard's fight with Walter, Luke emerges briefly from Alucard's Baskerville familiar which was sliced in half and used by Walter as a puppet to fight Alucard. However, Alucard uses his powers to turn Luke into a decoy to catch Walter off guard.

== Iscariot ==
The Iscariot Organization, also known as Vatican Section XIII, is a top-secret wing of the Vatican charged with the active pursuit and extermination of supernatural entities and heretics. Following the Catholic faith, Iscariot has a bitter rivalry with the Hellsing Organization, as it is Protestant in nature like the rest of London. During Hellsing's battle against Millennium's invasion of London, Iscariot follows suit as part of a power-mad Enrico Maxwell's scheme to wipe out both factions as well as Londoners caught in the crossfire. However, due to Alucard's familiars wiping out Maxwell and his amassed army, followed by the deaths of Father Anderson and Yumie, Iscariot loses nearly all of its strength. Decades later it is run by Makube as the new leader and Heinkel as the new top enforcer.

=== Alexander Anderson ===
Anderson with blessed blades

Voiced by: Nachi Nozawa (TV) Norio Wakamoto (OVA) (Japanese); Steven Brand; (English)

Alexander Anderson (アレクサンド・アンデルセン, Arekusando Anderusen) is a paladin within Iscariot, serving as its trump card against Alucard, who refers to him as his nemesis. The reason for this is Anderson's body is genetically modified to be a Regenerator, a superhuman able to fight supernatural creatures. Anderson's mission as a monster hunter, which reflects his own personal beliefs, is also the destruction of Alucard and the Hellsing organization. Anderson's arsenal includes blessed bayonets and the use of holy barriers to corner his quarry. He has a Scottish accent in the English adaptations of the manga and anime series, but canonically his nationality is unknown; he lives in Italy, where he operates an orphanage.

==== Appearance ====
Alexander Anderson's character has short, spiky blond hair (grey in the manga), brown/tanned skin, green eyes (blue in the manga), a heavy-set squared jaw, and constant stubble. He also has a large, wedge-shaped scar on his left cheek. In the first televised anime series, he was depicted with prominent, sharp canines, possibly to heighten his resemblance to a vampire and make him a symbolic counterpart to Alucard, the "tame monster" of the Hellsing Organization. Anderson is quite an imposing man, being very tall (slightly taller than Alucard, who himself is over 2 m (6 ft 7 in) in height and lean with broad shoulders. He wears round glasses, a large grey cassock (has purple trim in the TV series and white trim with blue interior in the OVA), grey pants (black in the OVA and white in the TV series), black boots, a black shirt (black with blue trim in the OVA and white in the TV series), a clerical collar (absent from both of the anime series), white gloves, and a silver cross (which often glows gold in the OVA) around his neck. On his gloves, there are inscriptions written across the crosses drawn on the back:

- For the right hand, "Jesus Christ is in Heaven"
- For the left hand, "Speak with Dead" (later changed to "Speak with the Dead")

In the manga, these inscriptions change sometimes, in Anderson's later appearances his gloves read "Iscariot Section XIII", the organization to which Anderson belongs. The character Father Barre portrayed by Michael Gothard, an exorcist and wild instigator depicted in Ken Russell's The Devils (1971) (a dramatization of Urbain Grandier), has been cited as a possible inspiration for Father Anderson.

==== Personality ====
Alexander Anderson normally appears as a calm and collected priest. He works at an orphanage in the manga and OVA and acts very kindly towards the children under his care. During battles, however, he reveals a darker side. He has an obsession for what appears to be his "crusade," and compulsively quotes passages of the Holy Bible as he speaks. He is extremely determined to achieve his end, however, he abhors the methods chosen by Maxwell to put it in motion. In battle, he is merciless and almost unstoppable due to his abilities. He has a habit of hissing during fights, and often loses control of himself much like Alucard. Despite this, he can stop himself and focus on his mission. He has a measure of self-restraint when innocents like tourists are caught in the middle or when someone has caught his admiration as Integra did.

==== Beliefs ====
Alexander Anderson is characterized as an ardent Catholic. His words and his constant quoting of scripture indicate a clear, almost fanatical obedience towards "the word of God". His behavior in the first volume was depicted as an intense Catholic priest, who went as far as calling Integra "Babylon", as a reference to Whore of Babylon and, like Maxwell, displayed an immense hatred for Protestants. In the first episode of Hellsing Ultimate, some of Anderson's statements heavily imply a fanatical hatred for all non-Catholics. Anderson tells a pair of young boys they should only engage in violence against "monsters and non-believers". He comments to his superiors it is fortunate that a large vampire population must be killing many English Protestants. Anderson resents England's control over Northern Ireland, which he believes is Catholic territory, and states it is his mission to kill unbelievers.

In the television series, Order 3: Sword Dancer, Paladin Alexander Anderson's actions are vaguely relativist. He ignores his true mission and instead focuses on the basic requirements of his crusade; thus, attacking Seras Victoria, Alucard and killing Captain Gareth of the Hellsing Organization, though Gareth was a human being and attempting to exterminate the same target as Alexander Anderson. While his orders from Iscariot specified the extermination of a single rogue vampire, he engages in combat with Alucard as well.

In the manga (and by extension the OVA, which is closer to the manga than the TV series), however, his character is much more complex. He shows a greater sense of morality both in his treatment of the orphans under his care. His eventual assistance to Integra and betrayal of Enrico Maxwell (who becomes drunk with power and starts killing innocent humans), is quite unlike the TV series Anderson who is portrayed as little more than a mindless, psychotic killer. His complexity in the manga is later demonstrated by his respect for Integra's conviction and for Seras' bravery. Specifically, he agrees to escort Integra to Hellsing HQ, because it would be impolite to leave a lady to walk there alone. Anderson tells the members of Iscariot to retreat from battle when Alucard releases his familiars. He wants them to live on and protect the Catholic religion, as he believes there are already enough souls in limbo. He also appears to have a form of respect for Alucard, shouting, "The black peril comes!" while laughing as Alucard enters the Thames at the end of Volume 7. In his final moments, Anderson consoled his grieving rival in his own way, telling him that monsters do not cry. In the TV series, Alucard refers to Anderson as a "dog of the Church" and is neither human nor monster. He is therefore incapable of killing him; only a human can do that. In the manga and OVA, however, Alucard shows great respect for Anderson and goes so far as to compare him to the men who were able to defeat Dracula (Integra's grandfather, Abraham Van Helsing and the other men from Bram Stoker's Dracula). He says although they were mere humans they possessed the will to destroy a monster such as Alucard. This changes, however, when Anderson chooses to use the Nail of Helena on himself to become a monster on an equal level to Alucard. At this point Alucard rules that Anderson, having sacrificed all of his humanity in exchange for power, is no longer worthy of destroying him and that Anderson must be killed. Alucard had previously stated he would be proud to die in battle against Anderson, but clearly Anderson forfeited that right by turning himself into a monster rather than a (regenerating) human.

==== Abilities ====
In battle, Alexander Anderson is often depicted using scores of blessed bayonets presumably made of silver as well as smaller blades which are held between his fingers like claws. He is shown to have extraordinary physical abilities, including strength, speed, and stamina. He is shown using pages from Bibles as barriers to ward off vampire movement, and also appears to be able to teleport himself amongst clouds of Bible pages. Anderson is a "Regenerator", meaning he utilizes Iscariot-developed technology that allows him to restore body parts that are lost and heal himself (this ability does not work in his battle with Alucard in OVA part 8, due to Alucard injuring him with the Jackal - an oversized pistol especially designed to be used against "Regenerators"). When using the nail of Helena his body becomes a mass of thorns and his healing factor has become more advanced to the point it rivals Alucard's as well as burning unholy beings, and enhancing his strength and speed. The cost however is losing his self as it caused him to become a mindless plant monster that can only be killed by removing his nail pierced heart where he returned to normal before dying. He is also shown to be a more charismatic and more morally right as a leader compared to Maxwell.

==== History ====
The early history of Alexander Anderson (such as when he joined Iscariot or what his childhood life was like) is largely unknown. He first appears in Hellsing Volume 1, when he is convinced by Father Renaldo to travel to Northern Ireland to deal with Alucard and Seras Victoria who are hunting a vampire. Believing that Northern Ireland is Catholic land and Protestant England has no jurisdiction there, Anderson agrees and travels there. He confronts Alucard, cutting off his head and chasing Seras through the building they are in. He catches up to her and is stopped by Integra just as he is about to kill her. Anderson says he will not back down against a "Protestant whore" and swiftly kills Integra's bodyguards. Before he can kill Integra, Alucard regenerates himself and engages Anderson. Anderson retreats when he realizes he cannot defeat Alucard with his current weapons and teleports away, swearing to kill them all next time. Anderson also appears in Crossfire.

Anderson appears again with Enrico Maxwell, the head of Iscariot to discuss with Integra about the instigator of the attack on the Hellsing manor led by Luke and Jan Valentine. Alucard appears after Maxwell insults Integra, which Maxwell responds by calling Anderson into play. Before they can start another duel, Alucard and Anderson are interrupted by Seras leading a group of elderly Japanese tourists. The two decide to postpone their fight. Anderson leaves, commenting on the quality of the museum asking Maxwell if next time he could bring some of the orphans to visit. In an almost humorously agitated manner, he then swears he will rip Alucard to pieces the next time they meet.

Later, Anderson is seen briefly watching the fight between Tubalcain Alhambra and Alucard on television. After Alhambra was taken care of, he is then sent to deliver a message to Alucard and Seras to return to London and report on the Millennium Organization. He fails to accomplish this task without first getting into a brief fistfight with Alucard. Afterward, he engages in battle with some paramilitaries sympathetic to the Millennium cause.

After The Major declares war against England, Anderson brings the rest of Iscariot with him there and saves Integra from a group of Nazi vampires. When Heinkel Wolfe attempts to apprehend her, Integra disagrees and asks Anderson if this is permissible; Anderson says it is not. He instructs Iscariot to escort Integra back to the Hellsing manor. Maxwell soon arrives in England with the remnants of the armies used in the Holy Crusades and takes the opportunity to kill all English "heretics". Seeing this, Anderson believes Enrico has quit serving God and now only serves his own power. When Heinkel informs Anderson of Iscariot's new orders to take Integra prisoner, Anderson expresses his displeasure. Before he can act against the rest of Iscariot, Seras arrives with her new powers awakened and does it for him. Anderson acknowledges her newfound power, telling Heinkel that Seras was not something the ordinary members of Iscariot could hope to fight any longer.

Anderson engages in what he considers the final confrontation with Alucard, getting wounded severely by Alucard's Jackal in the process. Trapped in a mesh of undead, Anderson is saved by the remnants of Section XIII. Anderson then reveals the weapon that Vatican Section III Matthew had provided him with: Helena's Nail. Knowing what he plans to do, Alucard begs Anderson not to become a monster like himself. Anderson ignores this warning, stating that he would be content with being a thoughtless and merciless weapon of God, and impales himself with the nail. Although appearing the same, the nail transforms him a thornlike monster version of himself, revealed to be a living mesh of thorns and vines held together and self-regenerating. They battle, with Anderson-monster nearly destroying Alucard, before Seras intervenes. However, Alucard allowed Anderson-monster to attack due to being in deep shock himself as he had hoped Anderson to be a worthy human opponent for "releasing" the vampire from his eternal "dream". The vampire then effortlessly burns through Anderson's vines and, plunging his hand into Anderson's chest, removes the nail along with Anderson's heart. This destroys most of Anderson's body in the process. As Anderson dies, he and Alucard exchange words. What remains of Anderson decays and turns to ash.

=== Enrico Maxwell ===
Voiced by: Hideyuki Tanaka (TV) Shō Hayami (OVA) Risa Hayamizu (Young) (Japanese); JB Blanc (Adult); Yuri Lowenthal (Young) (English)

Enrico Maxwell (エンリコ・マクスウェル, Enriko Makusuweru) is the fanatical leader of the Vatican's Special Section XIII, the Iscariot Organization. Although Maxwell controls his organization with an iron fist, his seemingly blind devotion to his mission often makes his underling Alexander Anderson question his motivations. As a child, he was abandoned by his parents and lived at an orphanage where he became acquainted with Anderson. Though Anderson tried to raise him as well as he could, Maxwell remained angry and spiteful, determined to become someone that people would not look down on.

He first appears after the Valentine brothers attack Hellsing Manor when Integra and Alucard travel to Rome to investigate Millennium. He has a bitter rivalry with Integra due to their similar occupations and differing ideologies. In their meeting, he reveals that the Vatican assisted in moving the future Millennium group members to South America. During the standoff between Alucard and the Millennium led police force in Rio de Janeiro, Anderson watches the scene unfold on the news. He is also present during the Major's declaration of war against London.

After being promoted to the rank of bishop, Maxwell is very quickly promoted again to archbishop by the Pope in light of Millennium's attack on London with a force of 3,000 Templars. However, he quickly becomes drunk with power as he orders his crusaders to slaughter London's Protestant survivors alongside Millennium and Hellsing. Eventually, Maxwell witnesses his army being helplessly wiped out by Alucard's familiars before his helicopter is shot down by Rip Van Winkle. Though the armored glass protects him from the fall, Anderson throws a bayonet at the glass, shattering it after deeming the man's selfish ambitions as a threat to the Vatican. Maxwell is then impaled to death. Alexander stops Alucard from absorbing his soul and leaves his body in a place away from the danger as a final act of kindness to his former charge.

=== Heinkel Wolfe ===
Voiced by: Mitsuki Saiga (Japanese); Karen Strassman (English)

Heinkel Wolfe (ハインケル・ウーフー, Hainkeru Ūfū) is an androgynous German assassin and priest within the Iscariot organization. She is partnered with her childhood friend Yumie under the command of Alexander Anderson. Heinkel's weapons of choice are pistols. While she first appeared as a bodyguard for Enrico Maxwell, Heinkel later leads a brigade of Catholic priests sent to apprehend Integra during Millennium's attack on London. As a result, Heinkel witnesses the death of Father Anderson before she attempts to avenge Yumie after being killed by Walter Dornez. But Heinkel is wounded after The Captain shoots a bullet through her cheeks as his way of telling her not to interfere in Walter's fight with Alucard. Despite the warning, and having taken The Captain's mercy and medical aid as an insult, a furious Heinkel refuses to quell her desire to avenge Yumie. She takes a Dragunov SVD sniper rifle with the intent to kill Walter. However, while Walter initially allows her to fire at him, Heinkel is soon crippled by the artificial vampire after he slices her arm and leg off. Though rescued by Iscariot, the ordeal makes Heinkel violent and impulsive. In the epilogue, Heinkel has apparently taken Anderson's position within Iscariot, having become immortal and unable to age.

=== Yumie Takagi ===
Voiced by: Yūko Kaida (Japanese); Siobhan Flynn (English)

Yumie Takagi (高木 由美江, Takagi Yumie) is a katana-wielding Japanese nun. She is a fanatical Catholic and seems genuinely to enjoy killing people using her almost superhuman sword skills alongside her childhood friend Heinkel. Yumie knows various Batto-jutsu techniques and is adept enough to kill even from outside the room where her victim is. She has also displayed instances of superhuman strength. During Millennium's attack on London, after witnessing Walter Dornez desecrating Father Anderson's remains, Yumie attempts to cut him down. However, she is outmatched and cut into pieces by Walter's wires.

In the Crossfire manga, she was show to have a split personality known as Yumiko Takagi (高木 由美子, Takagi Yumiko). In contrast to Yumie, the Yumiko persona is shy and timid. Yumiko comments on how hard it is for her to "get Yumie to sleep" after she has been provoked into action. The two personalities switch by dueling for control inside their mind. Yumiko takes off her glasses to trigger the change, which can also occur after a strong blow to the head.

=== Renaldo ===
Voiced by: Osamu Saka (Episode 1), Takahiro Yoshino (Episode 3) (Japanese); William Fredrick Knight (English)

Renaldo is an old Iscariot member informing Anderson of a vampire attack. He appears later with Maxwell accompanying him in various instances. He also appears in a flashback talking to Maxwell where he will be raised by Anderson.

=== Makube ===
Voiced by: Takashi Taniguchi (Japanese); Jesse Merlin (English)

Makube is the leader of Iscariot for 30 years after the destruction of London and Maxwell's death. He comes off as more level-headed than Maxwell. He is also more patient than his predecessor and seems to have more of a friendly rivalry with Integra.

== Anime characters ==
=== Incognito ===
Voiced by: Takumi Yamazaki (Japanese); Isaac C. Singleton Jr. (English)

The main antagonist of the first anime series (not to be confused with the OVA), Incognito is a masochistic and homicidal vampire from Africa who comes to England with the mission to destroy London and eat Alucard after defeating him. After converting the SAS soldiers, he slaughters into a new breed of FREAK vampires, to be used to attack Cambridge and Trafalgar Square, Incognito captures Integra for a ritual to summon Set. However, Incognito ends up being killed by Alucard after Integra enables him to fight to his full abilities.

=== Peter Fargason ===
Voiced by: Unshō Ishizuka (Japanese); W. Morgan Sheppard (English)

A member of the Hellsing organization and one of Seras's mentors along with Alucard, Walter, and Integra. Fargason is killed by a soldier towards the end of the series.

=== Helena ===
Voiced by: Akiko Hiramatsu (Japanese); Akure Wall (English)

Helena is a vampire character who looks like a little girl. However, the truth is that she was bitten by a vampire centuries ago and is a member of a small category of vampires that don't feel the need to feast on human blood. Her true age is reflected in her monotone expression and womanly voice. A solitary individual, Helena resides in a candlelit apartment filled with books. Her role in the story is to show Seras that vampires cease aging and thus become disconnected from the rest of the world. When Incognito arrives in England, he kills and devours Helena seemingly just for sport. despite her demise, Helena dies satisfied, now that she can finally reach the afterlife.

=== Kim ===
A news reporter who wants to expose vampires to the world, Kim is attacked by a vampire in the second episode of the television series but is saved by the Hellsing Organization. She then tries to lure the organization into a trap to expose them but ends up being foiled by Seras Victoria. Kim is then killed by Alucard.

=== Paul Wilson ===
Voiced by: Ken Narita (Japanese); Craig Young (English)

A former SAS soldier, Wilson is turned into a minion by Incognito. He has a strange and creepy obsession with Seras.

=== Laura ===
Voiced by: Mika Doi (Japanese); Siobhan Flynn (English)

Laura is a vampire who works for Incognito. Using her mental powers, she convinces everyone in the Hellsing organization that she is Integra's sister. Her job is to turn Integra into a ghoul, but she fails thanks to Seras being immune to her telepathy.

=== Chris Pickman ===
Voiced by: Yūji Takada (Japanese); Gildart Jackson (English)

The captain of the Hellsing organization military forces after the Valentine brothers' attack. Known for his ability to keep calm under stressful situations and devotion to the organization, he gets gunned down by a vampire soldier in the final battle between Hellsing and Incognito and pleads with Alucard to end his life to avoid turning him into a ghoul, wanting to die a human, to which Alucard gives him an honorable death.

=== Harry Anders ===
Voiced by: Takashi Taniguchi (Japanese); Arthur Russell (English)

An elite investigator working for MI-5 involved within the FREAK chip case and an acquaintance of Helena. He was also presumably a good friend of Seras' late father. He was killed by a car bomb after he and Seras returned from a meeting with Helena.

== Other characters ==
=== The Convention of Twelve ===
The Convention of Twelve is a group that assists the Hellsing organization. In the epilogue set 30 years after the war, Rob Walsh leads the twelve while Islands and Penwood are succeeded by their descendants.

=== Arthur Hellsing ===
Voiced by: Chikao Ohtsuka (Japanese); John Breen (English)

Arthur Hellsing is Integra Hellsing's father, and previously had control over Alucard. He seemed to very wary of using Alucard on missions and would typically send Walter Dornez instead. Eventually he confines Alucard to the catacombs after becoming paranoid that the vampire was too powerful for him to control.

Over the next 20 years, Arthur falls ill with a disease that is deemed terminal, and on his deathbed, he appoints his daughter Integra as the new leader of the Hellsing Organization. Arthur seemed to have a very close relationship with Integra. He cared deeply for her, and taught her everything that she needed to know about vampires and other supernatural creatures. He also seemed to trust her more that his own brother and eventually hands the organization over to her.

The relationship between Alucard and Arthur is very vague, and Arthur seems to be very distant and wary of Alucard. Surprisingly though, Arthur has a deep understanding of Alucard, and vampires in general. He also trusted Alucard enough to send Integra to the catacombs to awaken Alucard at the time of his death.

=== Abraham Van Helsing ===
Voiced by: Chikao Ohtsuka (Japanese); Curt Lowens (English)

The founder of the Royal Order of Protestant Knights, better known as the Hellsing Organization. He is the grandfather of Integra Hellsing and the father of Arthur and Richard Hellsing. In the backstory of Hellsing, which is heavily based on the events of Bram Stoker's Dracula, Van Helsing leads a group consisting of Arthur Holmwood, Quincy Morris and John Seward to hunt Alucard, known at this time as Count Dracula, and save Holmwood's Fiancée, Mina Harker, from the vampire. Alucard is ambushed by the group and is staked in the heart, however his body is not completely destroyed. Van Helsing then took the corpse of Alucard to England, where he used the resources of the newly established Hellsing Organization to experiment on and resurrect the vampire. Alucard then pledged his loyalty to Van Helsing, and by extension his bloodline and the Hellsing Organization.

=== Cheddar Priest ===
Voiced by: Masahiko Tanaka (TV) Kazunari Tanaka (OVA) (Japanese); JB Blanc (English)

Cheddar Priest is the first antagonistic vampire encountered in the series. He is responsible for turning all of the inhabitants of a nearby village into ghouls and is using them as his minions. When a police team investigates the mysterious murders, the priest sends his ghouls to kill them, leaving Seras as the lone survivor. She encounters the priest in a church where he reveals himself as a vampire. He states that he does not want another "vampire with free will running around", and attempts to assault Seras, but is interrupted by Alucard.

The priest, believing that Alucard was another human, commanded his ghouls to kill him. However, Alucard quickly heals his wounds and begins killing off the surrounding ghouls. The priest realizes that he cannot beat Alucard, and attempts to barter him with Seras' life. In response to this barter, Alucard asks Seras if she is a virgin, and when she confirms, the vampire shoots her, and the priest through the chest, killing him and almost killing Seras. It is after these events that Seras is bitten and turned into a vampire.

=== Leif and Jessica ===
Leif and Jessica are two young teenaged Briton vampires who go around killing random families. They not only drink it but use the victim's blood to write heretical messages and symbols for a ritual. They are convinced these killings can complete this ritual and they can become immortal. They are later killed by both Alucard and Seras, after being dispatched by Integra.

=== Richard Hellsing ===
Voiced by: Norio Wakamoto (TV) Yōsuke Akimoto (OVA) (Japanese); Steven Brand (English)

Richard Hellsing is Integra's uncle and Arthur's brother. After Arthur's death, Richard learns that the duties of the Hellsing Organization were given to Integra, instead of himself. This deeply enrages Richard, and he makes the decision to kill his niece and claim the Organization for himself. He eventually finds Integra hiding in the Catacombs of the Hellsing Manor and prepares to kill her. However, Integra's blood from his gunshot wound land on Alucard's corpse, allowing the vampire to be resurrected and slaughter Richard's men. After having his arm ripped off, Integra takes his gun and kills him.
