= Tomoe Ohmi =

Japanese singer and voice actress (born 1982)

Tomoe Ohmi 近江 知永
- Born: October 13, 1982 (age 43)
- Genres: Pop, anison
- Occupations: Singer, voice actress
- Instrument: Vocals
- Years active: 2005–present
- Label: evolution

Tomoe Ohmi (近江 知永, Ōmi Tomoe; born October 13, 1982) is a Japanese singer and voice actress. She received training from the Japan Narration Acting Institute (日本ナレーション演技研究所, Nippon Narēshon Engi Kenkyūjo) and RAMS Professional Education. She made her debut as a voice actress in the anime television series School Rumble.

== Discography ==
=== Albums ===
List of albums, with selected chart positions
Title	Album information	Oricon
Title	Album information	Peak position
Happy Days	Released: August 5, 2009; Catalog No.: EVCA-0012, EVCA-0013; Format: CD+DVD, CD	–

=== Singles ===
List of singles, with selected chart positions
Title	Single information	Oricon	Album
Title	Single information	Peak position	Album
"Utakata" ウタカタ	Released: July 27, 2005; Label: evolution; Catalog No.: EVCS-0003	–	Happy Days
"Float: Sora no Kanata de" Float～空の彼方で～	Released: November 23, 2005; Label: evolution; Catalog No.: EVCS-0004	156	Happy Days
"Yuunagi" 夕凪	Released: May 10, 2006; Label: evolution; Catalog No.: EVCS-0007	87	Happy Days
"Happy Days"	Released: July 25, 2007; Label: evolution; Catalog No.: EVCS-0010, EVCS-0011; Format: CD+DVD, CD	–	Happy Days
"Fuyu no Himawari" 冬の向日葵	Released: November 15, 2008; Label: evolution; Catalog No.: EVCS-0014; Format: CD	–	Happy Days
"Beloved"	Released: May 13, 2009; Label: evolution; Catalog No.: EVCS-0016	157	–
"Girlfriend" ガールフレンド	Released: July 28, 2010; Label: Dwango; Catalog No.: DGES-10001	191	–

=== Other singles ===
- "Otomegokoro Mugen" (2008) on Tribute to Masami Okui Buddy album

== Filmography ==
=== Anime ===
List of voice performances in anime
Year	Title	Role	Notes	Source
2004–06	School Rumble series	Madoka Kido		
2005	SoltyRei	Sarah Revant		
2006	Strawberry Panic!	Chihaya Takemura		
2006	Ray the Animation	One		
2006	Hanoka	Kaori Harusaki		
2007	Sketchbook Full Color's	Juju Sasaki		
2008	Onegai My Melody Kirara★	Tomato-chan		
2009	Ontama ja:おんたま!	Hikari Tojo	web series	
2010	The Legend of the Legendary Heroes	Girl		

=== Video games ===
List of voice performances in anime
Year	Title	Role	Notes	Source
2007	Aquarian Age Alternative		Arcade	
2009	Shining Force Feather	Sayaka		

=== Audio dramas ===
List of dub performances in audio dramas
Title	Role	Notes	Source
Colorful Makia and からふるまきあ～と		Drama CD	
School Rumble		Drama CD	
Sketchbook Full Color's	Kigi Sasaki	Drama CD	
SoltyRei	Sarah Revant	Drama CD	
Strawberry Panic		Drama CD	

=== Dubbing ===
List of dub performances in overseas productions
Title	Role	Notes	Source
Johnny Bravo	Shinki	Ep. "Johnny Bravo Goes to Bollywood"	
The Mr. Men Show	Disaster-chan, Pickle-chan, Couscous-chan		
