= Alucard (Hellsing) =

Fictional character from Hellsing

- Hellsing character
- Alucard as illustrated by Kouta Hirano
- First appearance: Hellsing chapter 1: "Vampire Hunter" (1997)
- Created by: Kouta Hirano
- Voiced by: Jouji Nakata (Japanese); Crispin Freeman (English)

In-universe information
- Full name: Vlad Drăculea III
- Aliases: Prince of Wallachia; Count Dracula
- Nickname: Alucard
- Species: Vampire
- Gender: Male

Alucard (Japanese: アーカード, Hepburn: Ākādo; lit. Arucard), previously Count Dracula (ドラキュラ, Dorakyura), is a fictional character and the protagonist of the Hellsing manga and anime series created by Kouta Hirano. A vampire devoted entirely to the current head of the Hellsing family, Integra Hellsing, Alucard works with the Hellsing Organization against other vampires and evil forces, fighting with ferocity and cruelty, sometimes only killing after a target has been disabled and humiliated.

As Count Dracula, he was defeated by Abraham Van Helsing and became the family's loyal servant, being heavily experimented upon to create the "ultimate undead". Decades later, Abraham's direct descendant Arthur Hellsing gives the Count the codename "Alucard". Hellsing is set over a hundred years later, where Alucard and the Hellsing Organization are forced to fight the remnants of a rogue Nazi battalion. Alucard also appears in the prequel series Hellsing: The Dawn, taking a female form alongside his partner Walter C. Dornez in a fight against the Nazis to stop them from producing vampire soldiers.

Hirano created Alucard as a powerful character who serves as a deus ex machina, effortlessly defeating most enemies. Alucard is voiced by Jouji Nakata in Japanese and Crispin Freeman in English. Critical response to the character has been positive for Alucard's dark traits such as sadism or supernatural abilities that make him stand out as excessively violent despite being the main hero. Alucard's design also stood out for being called "stylish", praising his outfits and weaponry. Alucard's voice portrayals by Nakata and Freeman were also met with a positive response.

== Creation and development ==
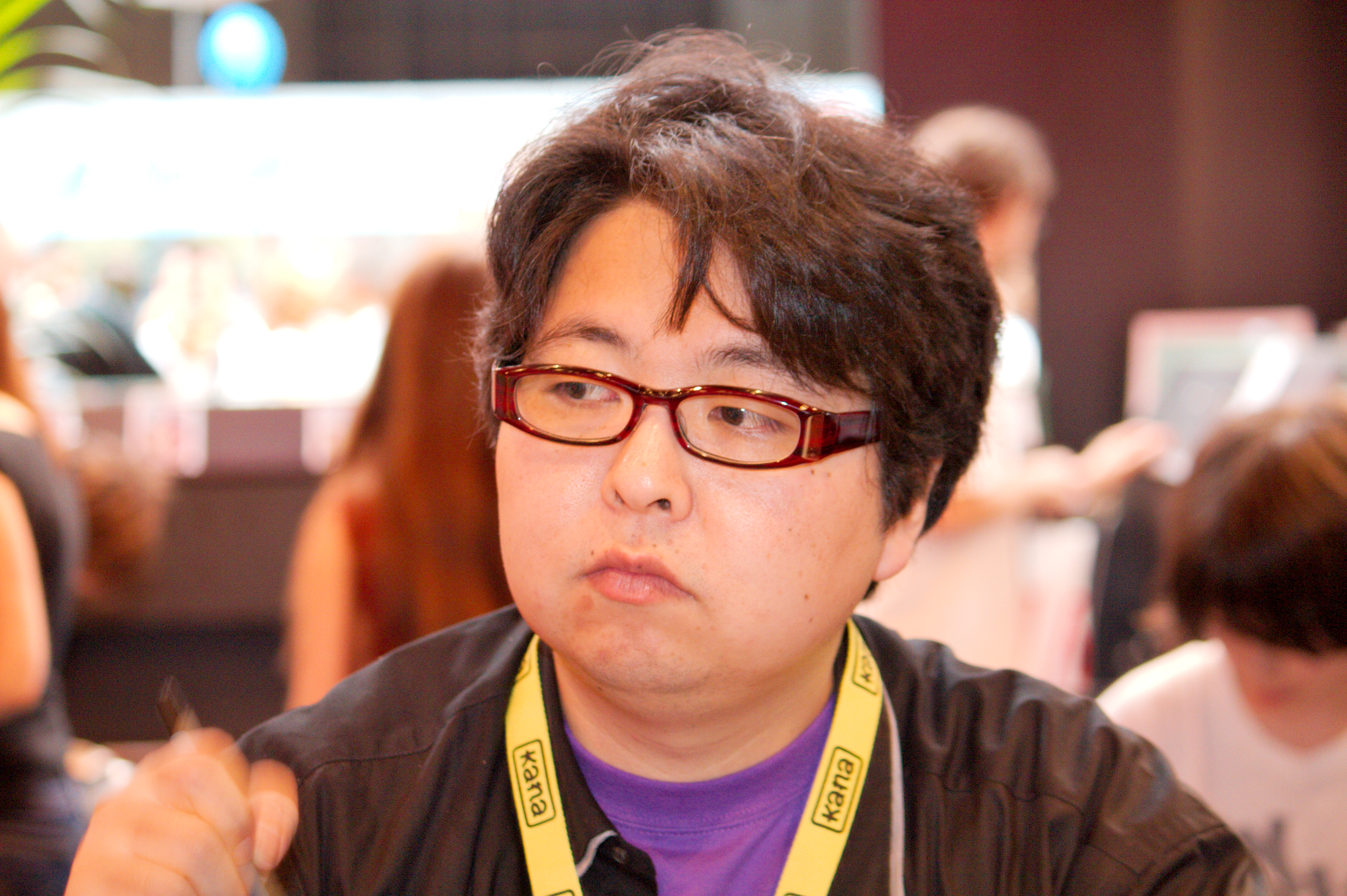
Kouta Hirano, the creator of Alucard

Manga author Kouta Hirano created Alucard. In regards to his drawing him, Hirano claims he does not particularly care about accurate depictions of weapons in his manga and draws multiple type of angles like whenever Alucard shoots a bullet. In regards to Alucard's weaponry in fighting, Hirano claims he simply has an endless supply of bullets. Initially, Hirano felt the manga had issues in terms of fighting because Alucard was too powerful. As a result, Father Alexander Anderson was created to be the only individual capable of being Alucard's equal. He thought about a character that could go against Alucard, and decided to create Anderson. Even if the Captain joined the battle between Alucard and Anderson, he does not think he would win. Even though the Millennium is the central evil organization, they are not strong enough to fight Alucard. Alucard does not struggle in his fights with the Millennium. He easily defeats him. He loses when the Major got involved, but in the end the Millennium was not really strong enough a character to be considered a rival.

The flow of the Hellsing manga was something that was decided on from the beginning. Multiple fans wondered if Alucard would form a relationship with his student Seras Victoria but Hirano did not find it possible. As a result, Hirano introduced the character Pip Bernadotte so he could stick him with Seras during the narrative. Meanwhile, Alucard would keep a deep bond with his master, Integra Hellsing, early in the story but he refrained from regarding it as a romantic style. That was an unwavering part of the unfolding story. For the prequel Hellsing: The Dawn, a dynamic was used between Alucard, Integra and Walter to act properly since Alucard was more active.

After manga volume 8, during series' climax, the author felt he "got a little hasty" and ended the long battle between Alucard and Anderson. As a result, he thinks Alucard's battle against Anderson had a better show of battle in comparison to the previous battle against Anderson were both fighters were nearly equals. The reason he thinks so is because he had a time limit for completion when he was drawing them. In regards to Walter's betrayal, Hirano decided to use him as a villain by the time Alucard, who had been sleeping underground, revived, to face Integra and claimed that despite the close experience both character has, Walter was still clearly weaker than Alucard.

=== Casting ===
Jouji Nakata voices the character in Japanese. Nakata recalls being praised for providing Alucard's emotions rarely explored and that his fans were from multiple demographies. Looking back at his career, Nakata said that Alucard was the one character he most enjoyed voicing and the easiest one to portray. He said that villain characters and ones with distinct personalities were easier than ones with not much personality as they can be shaped and changed up.

In an interview with Anime News Network, American voice actor Crispin Freeman stated that Alucard was the first big role he had ever since becoming an actor. He enjoyed voicing Alucard, stating that he loved "characters who are on the edge of madness for one reason or another". When the OVAs, Hellsing Ultimate, were announced, Freeman was not contacted to take the part of Alucard again, something that bothered his fans. However, Geneon Entertainment producers called Freeman and asked him if he could return to voice Alucard again. In comparing the two Alucards he voiced, he believes they are nearly different individuals as a result of how the OVAs differ from the television series. Freeman notes that he was originally going to give Alucard a Romanian accent, but decided on an American accent instead. Due to the length of Hellsing Ultimate, Freeman considered his work as a "marathon" due to the amount of lines he had to record per episode based on the screentime Alucard has. However, he felt that there were easier episodes due to the protagonist having fewer lines as the narrative was more primarily focused on a supporting character. Due to Alucard being based on the Bram Stoker's novel character Dracula and Freeman being a fan of mythological storytelling, the actor felt he highly enjoyed Alucard, calling him a "psychologically complex character".

== Appearances ==
=== In Hellsing ===
Alucard is a vampire working for the organization Hellsing. Alucard is violent, sadistic, and masochistic. He often taunts and belittles his opponents, allowing them to inflict wounds before regenerating and retaliating. His real identity is that of Vlad Drăculea III, who spent much of his mortal life fighting the Ottomans. Vlad was held captive by the Ottomans as a child, facing heavy abuse and sexual assault by his captors. Through his battles, Vlad sacrificed many, ally and foe, in the name of God, believing that God does not reward conventional prayer, but instead wants mortals to show their faith through battle. However, when his army is defeated and he faces execution, Vlad, believing he has been abandoned by God, turns his back on the divine by drinking the blood of the battlefield, becoming Count Dracula.

The manga briefly deviates the events of Bram Stoker's Dracula in regards to motive and his defeat. In Hellsing, Dracula travelled to England to pursue Mina Harker out of affection, rather than a lust for power. During his defeat, Dracula is staked in the heart by Quincy Morris, but unlike the novel, is not decapitated by Arthur Holmwood, who instead rescues and embraces Mina. Following his death, Dracula is taken back to England by Van Helsing where he is revived. The Count pledges his loyalty to Van Helsing, deeply respecting that a mere human was able to defeat a demonic creature.

Years after his defeat, Dracula became a servant of the Van Helsing family, who not only augmented his formidable abilities, but also placed shackles on his power. Now codenamed Alucard by Arthur Hellsing, he, along with a young Walter C. Dornez, were sent to Warsaw, Poland to stop Millennium's vampire production program. Later, Arthur imprisoned Alucard in a dungeon in the Hellsing manor, as he believed the vampire was too powerful to be used frequently. After 20 years of imprisonment, Arthur's daughter Integra Hellsing, who was marked for death by her traitorous uncle, opens Alucard's crypt as a final resort. Her blood awakened and resuscitated the ancient vampire, who then executed Integra's uncle and his followers, and willingly entered the service of Integra. Despite his nature, Alucard expresses admiration for humans, most notably Integra and the determination of his rival, Alexander Anderson, to destroy him an example of the "fantastic" and "magnificent" qualities of humans.

Whenever he drinks his victim's blood, Alucard (along with all other true vampires) absords the soul of that person to obtain their memories while converting the victim into an extension of himself referred to as a Familiar. Alucard exhibits incredible accuracy when firing his twin large caliber handguns (his basic set being chambered in a modified .454 Casull; a more powerful pair, codenamed 'Jackal' and armed with explosive rounds, was designed to fight regenerators. He can tear humans apart with ease and move faster than the eye can see. While often seen a male human, Alucard has a tendency to take other humanoid forms (among them being a young girl, a form he took while infiltrating the Nazi group Millennium during World War II).

Anderson, augmented into a supernatural being by the Nail of Helena, managed to critically injure Alucard during their final duel, which created a chain reaction that destroyed all Alucard's familiars except Luke Valentine and the Hellhound. Although Alucard recovered thanks to Seras' intervention and successfully defeated Anderson, he was then attacked by Walter, who had undergone vampirization by Millennium in order to kill Alucard when he was most vulnerable. However, Walter was tricked (via illusion) into killing Valentine instead; before he could get another chance to land a fatal blow, Alucard began absorbing the blood of the millions who died in the Battle of London, thus giving himself an indefinite number of regenerations and a new army of the dead. Unknown to Alucard, Schrödinger had killed himself and fallen into the river of blood on the Major's orders; mixed in with the millions of other souls Alucard had consumed, he was unable to recognize himself and therefore neither he nor Alucard was able to exist, causing Alucard to vanish. During the series' ending, after Alucard destroyed every additional soul in his body, he gained the ability to exist "everywhere and nowhere".

=== In Hellsing: The Dawn ===
The manga Hellsing: The Dawn and its animated adaptation focus on a younger Alucard taking the form of a woman while working during WWII. A much younger Walter is sent by Hellsing behind enemy lines with a giant casket to eliminate a new threat from the Nazis. In an attempt to stop the Nazi project and to protect England and The Allies current head of the Hellsing House, Sir Arthur Hellsing, is sending his best agents – Walter C. Dornez and Alucard – into German-occupied Poland where monstrous experiments are being conducted.

=== Other appearances ===
Alucard appears as a playable operator in Season 6 of Call of Duty: Modern Warfare II.

== Reception ==
=== Popularity ===
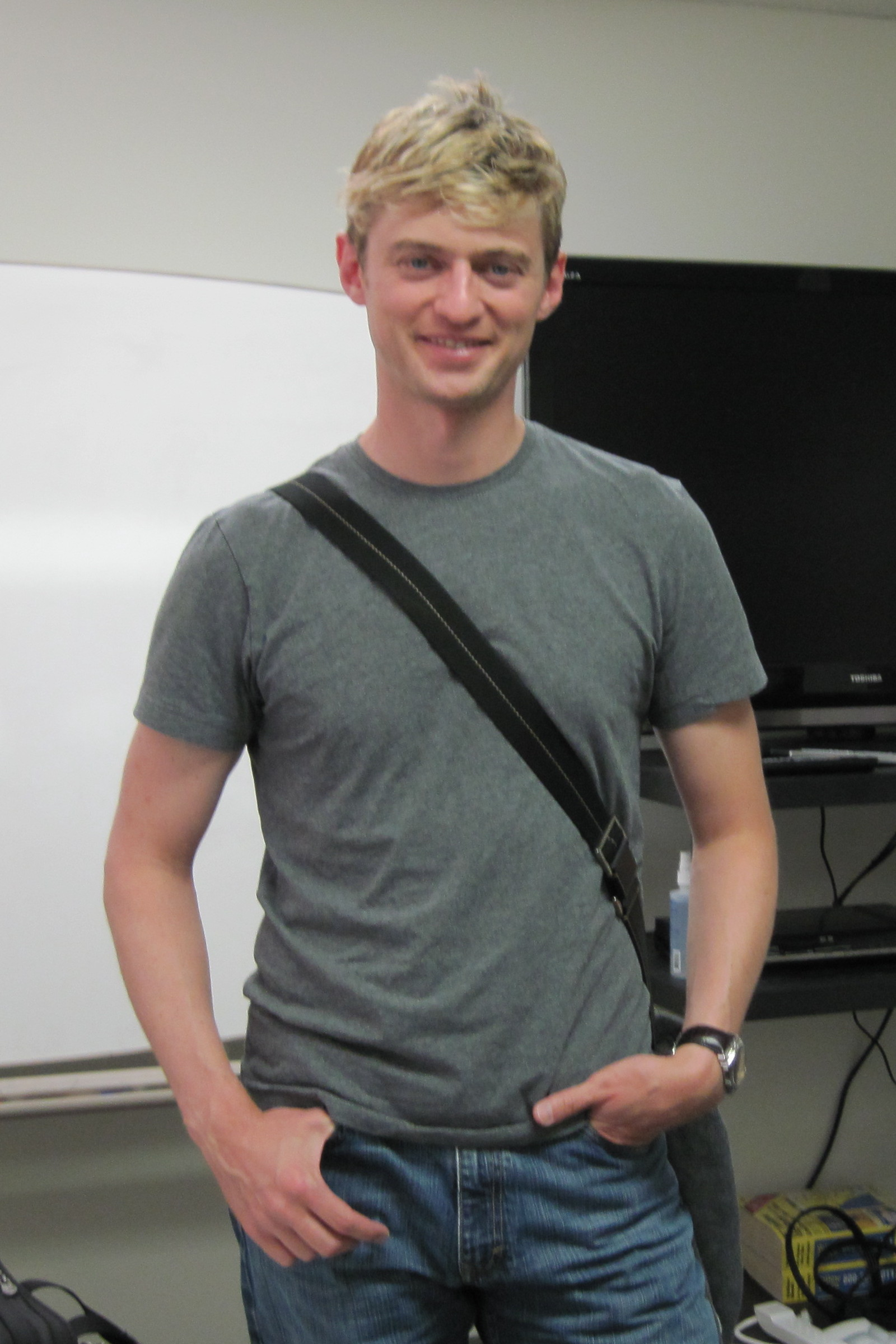
Crispin Freeman received praise for his portrayal of Alucard.

Alucard has been a popular character. In the Society for the Promotion of Japanese Animation Awards from 2008, Alucard was nominated as one of the best male characters with Jouji Nakata's portrayal of the character also being nominated. In a poll by AnimeAnime, Alucard was voted as the second best Nakata character behind Corporal Giroro from Sgt. Frog. However, both lost to Ichigo Kurosaki from Bleach and Tomokazu Sugita for The Melancholy of Haruhi Suzumiya's Kyon, respectively. Various merchandise based on Alucard's appearance has been created, including action figures, bust figures and key-chains. IGN ranked him as the 21st greatest anime character of all time, saying that "There have been many vampires in anime, but none have been as deliciously sadistic as Alucard." Complex listed him as the 15th most stylish character in anime. Anime News Network listed him as one of "6 Strange Faces of Dracula's Descendents" based on how different is Alucard to the novel character.

=== Critical response ===
Critical response to Alucard's character has been positive. Ever since his introduction in the manga, Justin Rich from Mania Entertainment saw Alucard as an interesting character due to his brief encounter with Anderson which shows a potential for what their actions in the future might be. Anime News Network's Mike Crandol praised Alucard for being "a refreshing change from the traditional, mopey, woe-is-me vampire anti-hero", and called him "quite the cool figure". On a similar note, Alucard's nature as a vampire was noted to be a new take of the usage of the archetype due to how Alucard trains Seras Victoria to the point it feels like a coming of age for Alucard's subordinate. Despite his sadistic nature, Comic Book Resources pointed out that Alucard is contrasted by the personalities of Seras and Integra whom are noted to make Alucard make more charming as he sees both of them in a friendlier well when compared to his regular dark persona. His dark personality stood out with T.H.E.M Anime Reviews calling him as an "anti-hero through and through, but you just can't help rooting for him even when it's obvious he's not really a good guy at all..." Carl Kimlinger also from Anime News Network said Alucard "He's one of the scariest, and most unspeakably cool, anti-heroes to ever slaughter his way through an anime." As a result, Kimlinger felt Alucard's character to be series' strongest part. Patrick King from AnimeFringe said that Alucard's portrayal in the first Hellsing anime made him come across as one of the best anime characters he has ever seen, comparing him with the famous Spike from Cowboy Bebop calling him "the perfect mix of grace and violence, propriety and chaos." DVD Talk found Alucard's first fight in the anime so ridiculously violent that he believes Toonami's audience would like it as instead Alucard would be more enjoyed by an adult demographic.

In regards to his role in the story, Comic Book Resources felt Alucard's battle to be enjoyable due to the amount of gore provided through his fighting style involving both supernatural abilities and usage of guns. The Fandom Post enjoyed both Alucard's presence and lack of presence in the narrative for the impact it has on the cast as well as how he is humanized when fighting with his full power while also interacting with Integra. Manga News expressed similar feeling as without Alucard, Seras Victoria's forces remain notably weaker in comparison to the point he missed the character. However, the writer had mix feelings in regards to Alucard's understanding of his rival Anderson's. While the final fight was praised for developing Alucard and show his past, his subsequent betrayal by Walter and brief fight with him felt "flat" alongside his fate in the finale. The same site also praised Alucard's final fight against Anderson in Hellsing Ultimate, citing it as the greatest highlight of the entire series and found Hirano's take on the Dracula myth as one of the "wildest interpretation" he has seen. Freeman's work for providing a "gothic depth befitting a powerful master vampire". THEM Anime Reviews noted that while Alucard might come across as a villain rather than a hero due to his sadistic actions, the poorly developed villains make it easier for the viewers to root for the lead. Similarly, DVD Talk praised how Ultimate portrayed Alucard in the finale not only for his fights against Anderson and Walter but also about how his past life is explored while acclaiming Freeman's work. Joji Nakata's work as Alucard was also met with similar response by Anime News Network alongside Norio Wakamoto (Anderson) for having the best deliveries in the Japanese version. Manga News criticized Alucard's fate in the finale for his apparent death during the fight against the Millennium organization only to return in the final chapter for unexplained reasons.

Critics often commented on Alucard's appearance. Comparing the Alucard's characterization between the television series and the OVAs, Anime News Network felt the former was "a kind of sexy bishonen character" as his action scenes were toned alongside the violence he occasionally caused, making the latter more interesting as a result of his sadistic nature and gore. UK Anime Network and Manga Life agreed, feeling that Alucard looks more like a villain in the OVAs rather than a hero. Comic Book Resources found the design stylish alongside the guns Alucard wields. Jason Thompson commented that when the manga started "Alucard looked too much like Master of Mosquiton, or another badass manga character with John Lennon glasses" and thought he seems like Vash the Stampede from Trigun, something which AnimeNation agreed with. Comics Beat claimed that Alucard's general look was "stylish" not only due to his clothing but the detail given to his guns. In a more negative view, Alucard's female form was criticized by Anime News Network due to Hirano not being able to draw properly a female character, resulting in the female form to look as tomboyish as Integra Hellsing.

Brianna Murch from Bridgewater State University commented that Alucard's acceptance of Integra as his new master finding her as an equal, the way Alucard shoots and bites Seras Victoria to make her a vampire was compared to the cruel of fate of raped women despite her accepting the role of becoming a vampire. As Integra is not a vampire, Alucard's respect for her convictions and calculating mind heighten his frustration towards Seras. Unlike Integra's relationship with Alucard, Alucard's relationship with Seras Victoria is compared more to a husband and master with his wife and student. The latter case was notable for being one of the few cases where a female vampire is portrayed in fiction. Alucard was also compared with Alexandru Muşina's novel Dracula's Nephew as two rather authoritative contemporary references modifying the vampiric epitome originally outlined by Bram Stoker.
