= Jouji Nakata =

Japanese voice actor and narrator

- 中田 譲治
- Born: Hitoshi Nakata; April 22, 1954 (age 72); Tokyo, Japan
- Occupations: Actor; voice actor; narrator
- Years active: 1979–present
- Agent: Office Osawa
- Height: 175 cm (5 ft 9 in)

Jouji Nakata (中田 譲治, Nakata Jōji; born April 22, 1954), sometimes anglicized to George Nakata, is a Japanese actor, voice actor, and narrator who is affiliated with the Office Osawa agency. His major voice roles include Alucard in Hellsing, Hijikata Toshizo in Golden Kamuy, Roy Revant in Solty Rei, Giroro in Sgt. Frog, Kirei Kotomine in the Fate franchise, and the title character in Gankutsuou: The Count of Monte Cristo. In video game franchises, he voices Ieyasu Tokugawa and Kenshin Uesugi in Samurai Warriors and Warriors Orochi series, Albert Wesker in the Resident Evil franchise, Sol Badguy in the Guilty Gear series since Guilty Gear 2: Overture, Naobito Zen'in in Jujutsu Kaisen and Kazuya Mishima in the first, second and first Tag installments of the Tekken series.

== Biography ==
Nakata studied at the Toho Gakuen College of Drama and Music. His first roles were for live-action works where his major characters portrayed included Sir Cowler in Choushinsei Flashman and Great Professor Bias in Choujuu Sentai Liveman of the Super Sentai series. He was doing theater work as well as live-action drama and voice dubbing when Michiko Nomura, who had worked on Sazae-san, suggested him to become a voice actor. Nakata said in an interview with Sutoraiku that he compared the pay for the roles and was very astonished by the difference, so he then switched to full-time voice acting.

He narrated Mobile Suit Victory Gundam which aired in 1993. In 1994, he voiced Murakumo Yagami, the series' main antagonist in Blue Seed. In 1994, he dubbed the voice of Kazuya Mishima in Tekken 1 and the voice was also used for the second chapter Tekken 2 (1995) and the subsequent Tekken tag tournament (1999). In the 1994 anime film Street Fighter II: The Animated Movie he voiced Balrog (Street Fighter) when the character was named M. Bison. Nakata said that his role in the 1996 anime Escaflowne helped advance his career; there he played Folken. He would continue to voice major antagonists including Gaav in Slayers Next, Stargazer in Lost Universe, and Brian J. Mason in Bubblegum Crisis Tokyo 2040.

In 2001, he voiced the antihero Alucard in the Hellsing TV series. Looking back at his career, Nakata said that Alucard was the one character he most enjoyed voicing and the easiest one to portray. He said that villain characters and ones with distinct personalities were easier than ones with not much personality as they can be shaped and changed up. He later reprised his role as Alucard in the Hellsing Ultimate OVAs.

The year 2004 saw Nakata in some breakout roles. He voiced the title character in Gankutsuou: The Count of Monte Cristo which was popular among the late night adult audience, but he also joined Sgt. Frog in voicing Corporal Giroro, which was popular with kids and adults as it aired during prime time. In 2005, he picked up voice roles as villains Megatron in Transformers Cybertron and Amshel Goldsmith in Blood+. He voiced Roy Revant, the protagonist of SoltyRei.; the director for SoltyRei would later cast him as the narrator in the Amagami SS visual novel anime adaptation.

He joined the Fate franchise, voicing Kirei Kotomine in the 2004 visual novel Fate/stay night, its anime adaptation in 2006, its feature film Fate/stay night: Unlimited Blade Works in 2010, and the prequel series Fate/zero. In his interview, Nakata said that co-creator Kinoko Nasu had known him since his Tokusatsu days, and that he had been involved in many of Type-Moon's titles, having voiced Nrvnqsr Chaos in Melty Blood and going on to voice Souren Araya in the anime adaptation of Kara no Kyoukai. In 2014, he reprised his role of Kirei for the Fate/stay night: Unlimited Blade Works television series.

In 2013 he was the narrator for Noucome, voiced lead character Sigmund in Unbreakable Machine-Doll, and voiced Nyanta in Log Horizon.

In video games, he voiced in the Samurai Warriors (Sengoku Musou) series as Uesugi and Tokugawa Ieyasu. In overseas dubbing, he has voiced various characters in shows and films such as 300, Sex and the City, and The Little Mermaid. Nakata said that because of his live-action background, he felt comfortable with portraying the overseas dubbing roles, although he still enjoyed the creativity coming from the two-dimensional anime characters.

== Filmography ==
=== Animation ===
Year	Title	Role	Notes	Source
1988	Legend of Galactic Heroes	Leopold Schumach		
1990	Record of Lodoss War	Jester	OVA	
1993–94	Mobile Suit Victory Gundam	Narrator, Godward Hain, Leonid Armodoval		
1994	Dirty Pair Flash	Waldes		
1994	Street Fighter II: The Animated Movie	M. Bison		
1994	Blue Seed	Murakumo Yagami		
1994–95	Shippu Iron Leaguer	Fighter Spirits/Silver Jasutisu		
1995	Armitage III: Dual Matrix	Strings		
1996–	Case Closed	Various characters		
1996	Power Dolls	Stan Finkle	OVA ep 2	
1996	The Vision of Escaflowne	Folken Fanel		
1996	Slayers Next	Gaav		
1996	X the Movie	Kusanagi Shiyu		
1996–98	Rurouni Kenshin	Lentz		
1996–97	Brave Command Dagwon	Brave Seijin		
1997	Ehrgeiz	Camel		
1997	Macross Dynamite 7	Graham		
1998	Bubblegum Crisis Tokyo 2040	Brian J. Mason		
1998–2000	Record of Lodoss War: Chronicles of the Heroic Knight	Kashue		
1998	Cowboy Bebop	MPU	Ep. 9	
1998	Lost Universe	Stargazer		
1998	Shadow Skill: Eigi	Caravan Master	Ep. 1	
1998	Serial Experiments Lain	Man in Black		
1998	Sorcerous Stabber Orphen	Childman		
2000	UFO Baby	Wannya's Father		
2000	Boogiepop Phantom	Spooky Electric		
2000	Argento Soma	Michael Heartland		
2001	Hellsing	Alucard	TV series	
2001	Samurai Girl Real Bout High School	Giroro		
2001	Condor Hero	Kakusei		
2002	RahXephon	Jin Kunugi		
2002	Shaman King	Ados	Ep. 49, 63	
2002	Macross Zero	Sara's father, Bird Human		
2003	Texhnolyze	Motoharu Kimata		
2003	Fullmetal Alchemist	Halling		
2003	Ninja Scroll: The Series	Rouga	TV	
2003–	Peacemaker Kurogane	Hijikata Toshizō		
2003	E's Otherwise	Branded		
2003	Gungrave	Lad Carabell		
2003	Gad Guard	Bart		
2003–07	Naruto	Baki		
2003	Requiem from the Darkness	Kitabayashi Danjou		
2004–05	Gankutsuou: The Count of Monte Cristo	The Count of Monte Cristo		
2004	Elfen Lied	Bandou		
2004	Fafner in the Azure: Dead Aggressor	Kōzō Minashiro (Soushi's father)		
2004	Galaxy Angel X	Bartender	Ep. 8	
2004	Ragnarok The Animation	Herman		
2004–05	Samurai Champloo	Momochi Ginsa		
2004–2011 and 2014	Sgt. Frog series	Corporal Giroro		
2005	The Princess in the Birdcage Kingdom	King		
2005	Transformers: Cybertron	Megatron (Japanese:Master Megatron)		
2005	Sonic X	Dark Oak		
2005–06	Blood+	Amshel Goldsmith		
2005–06	SoltyRei	Roy Revant		
2005	Magical Girl Lyrical Nanoha A's	Clyde Harlaown	Ep. 10	
2006	Kishin Houkou Demonbane	Titus		
2006	Fate/stay night	Kirei Kotomine		
2006	Black Lagoon	Kageyama		
2006	Hellsing Ultimate	Alucard		
2006–07	Code Geass series	Diethard Reid		
2006–07	Shijou Saikyou no Deshi Kenichi	Shōgo Kitsukawa (Berserker)		
2007	Lucky Star	Shop Assistant 1	Ep. 13	
2007	Sketchbook	Kuma		
2007	The Garden of Sinners	Souren Araya		
2008	Amatsuki	Shamon		
2008	To Love Ru	Guinguld	Ep.19	
2008	Nabari no Ou	Tojuro Hattori		
2008	Kurozuka	Benkei		
2008–09	Tales of the Abyss	Van Grants		
2008–09	Linebarrels of Iron	Kunio Ishigami		
2009	Kurokami: The Animation	Steiner		
2009	Saki	Haramura Nodoka's father, Narration		
2009	Shangri-La	Momoko		
2009	Canaan	Taxi Driver		
2010	Fate/stay night: Unlimited Blade Works	Kirei Kotomine	Feature film	
2010	Tegami Bachi	Reverend Weller	Ep. 17	
2010	Angel Beats!	Naoi's father	Ep. 6	
2010	Amagami SS	Narrator (Sae Nakata Chapter)	Ep. 9-12	
2010	Strike Witches 2	General B	Ep. 10	
2010	Demon King Daimao	Peterhausen		
2010	Amagami SS+ plus	Narrator (Sae Nakata Chapter)	Ep. 9-10	
2010–11	Nura: Rise of the Yokai Clan	Gyuki	Also Demon Capital	
2011	Kaibutsu Ōjo OVA	Gilliam		
2011	One Piece	Hody Jones		
2011	Working!!	Hyōgo Otoo		
2011	Crayon Shin Chan	Komachi's Husband (Ep. 617)		
2011–12	Fate/Zero	Kirei Kotomine		
2011	Dream Eater Merry	John Doe		
2011–2012	Horizon in the Middle of Nowhere	Innocentius, Narrator		
2011	A Certain Magical Index II	Yamisaka Ouma	Ep.1	
2011	Doraemon	Lying Mirror	3rd Series	
2011	C3	Abyss		
2011	Phi Brain: Puzzle of God	Enigma	3rd series	
2012	Saki Achiga-hen episode of Side-A	Narration		
2010	Nyaruko: Crawling with Love	Lloigor	Ep. 11-12	
2011–12	Sket Dance	Tetsuji Chūma		
2011–12	Carnival Phantasm	Neco-arc Chaos / Kirei Kotomine / Nrvnqsr Chaos		
2012	Chō Soku Henkei Gyrozetter	Hakase Kurudo (Dr. Claude?)		
2012	Code:Breaker	Prime Minister Fujiwara		
2012	Hakuōki Reimeiroku	Kamo Serizawa		
2013	Noucome	Narrator		
2013	Unbreakable Machine-Doll	Sigmund		
2013–21	Log Horizon	Nyanta	Also second & third season	
2013	Tamayura: More Aggressive	Maestro		
2014	Saki: The Nationals	Narration		
2014	D-Frag!	Sean Konekone	TV series and OAD	
2014–15	Samurai Warriors (Sengoku Musou)	Tokugawa Ieyasu	TV series	
2014	Fairy Tail	Keyes		
2014	Date A Live II	Elliot Baldwin Woodman	Ep.4	
2014	Akame ga Kill!	River		
2014	Fate/stay night: Unlimited Blade Works	Kirei Kotomine	TV series	
2014	Gugure! Kokkuri-san	Shigaraki		
2014	Amagi Brilliant Park	Rubrum the Red Dragon		
2014	Terra Formars	Alexander Gustav Newton	OVA	
2014	Tokyo ESP	Committee Head Edoyama		
2015	Yo-kai Watch: The Movie	Horse		
2015	Ace of the Diamond Season 2	Sakaki Eijirō		
2015	Aquarion Logos	Sōgon Kenzaki		
2015	Anti-Magic Academy: The 35th Test Platoon	Vlad		
2015	Million Arthur	Lion		
2015	Arpeggio of Blue Steel -Ars Nova Cadenza-	Shōzō Chihaya	2nd feature film in Arpeggio of Blue Steel series	
2016	Maho Girls PreCure!	Gamets	Eps. 1-18, 43-44	
2016	Concrete Revolutio: The Last Song	Carolco Wilder	Ep. 7	
2016	Blood Blockade Battlefront King of the Restaurant of Kings	Head Waiter	OVA	
2016	Fate/kaleid liner Prisma Illya 3rei!!	Ramen Shop Owner	Eps. 2, 4	
2017	Seiren	Vermilion		
2017	Land of the Lustrous	Kongo		
2017	In Another World With My Smartphone	Tristwin Ernes Belfast		
2017	The Ancient Magus' Bride	Ashen Eye		
2018–present	Golden Kamuy	Hijikata Toshizō	Also second, third, & fourth season	
2019	Date A Live III	Elliot Baldwin Woodman	Ep.3	
2019	Kengan Ashura	Hideki Nogi		
2019	High School Prodigies Have It Easy Even In Another World	Oslo El Gustav		
2019	Blade of the Immortal -Immortal-	Kagimura Habaki		
2020	The Seven Deadly Sins: Wrath of the Gods	Cusack		
2020	Ace of the Diamond act II	Sakaki Eijirō		
2020	Fate/Grand Order - Absolute Demonic Front: Babylonia	Ziusudra / King Hassan		
2020	Assault Lily Bouquet	Takamatsu Kogetsu		
2021-23	Jujutsu Kaisen	Naobito Zen'in		
2021	Vlad Love	Mitsugu's pops		
2021	Dragon Goes House-Hunting	Lord Samuel		
2021	Yu-Gi-Oh! Sevens	Goha 66		
2021	The Detective Is Already Dead	Cerberus		
2022	Date A Live IV	Elliot Baldwin Woodman	Eps. 4 and 6	
2023	My Daemon	Genjiro Houjou		
2024	Shangri-La Frontier	Professor	Ep.25	
2024	365 Days to the Wedding	Jouji-san		
2024	Nier: Automata Ver1.1a	Red Girls	Eps. 23 and 24	
2025	Guilty Gear Strive: Dual Rulers	Sol Badguy		

=== Animated films ===
Year	Title	Role	Notes	Source
2006–2026	Sgt. Frog	Corporal Giroro	Film hexalogy	
2017–2020	Fate/stay night: Heaven's Feel	Kirei Kotomine	Film trilogy	
2020	Crayon Shin-chan: Crash! Rakuga Kingdom and Almost Four Heroes	King Rakuga		
2022	One Piece Film: Red	Howling Gab		

=== Video games ===
Year	Series	Role	Notes	Source
1994	Tekken	Kazuya Mishima, Lee Chaolan	Arcade, PS1	
1995	Tekken 2	Kazuya Mishima	Arcade, PS1	
1998	Sonic Adventure	E-102 Gamma	Dreamcast	
1998	Saint of Braves Baan Gaan	Baan	PlayStation	
1998	Ehrgeiz	Ken Mishima / Godhand	Arcade, PS1	
1999	Tekken Tag Tournament	Kazuya Mishima, Lee Chaolan (laughs)	PS2	
2000	Persona 2: Eternal Punishment	Baofu	PS1, PSP	
2002	Xenosaga Episode I: Der Wille zur Macht	Margulis	PS2	
2002	Melty Blood	Nrvnqsr Chaos, Neko-Arc Chaos	PC	
2003	Arc the Lad: Twilight of the Spirits	Ganz	PS2	
2004	Samurai Warriors: Xtreme Legends	Uesugi	PS2	
2004	Xenosaga Episode II: Jenseits von Gut und Böse	Margulis	PS2	
2004	Kishin Houkou Demonbane	Titus	PS2	
2007	Dragon Quest VIII	Morrie	PS2, 3DS	
2005	Tales of the Abyss	Van Grants	PS2	
2005	Kingdom Hearts II	Luxord	PS2	
2006	Enchanted Arms	Kou	PS3, 360	
2006	Dirge of Cerberus: Final Fantasy VII	Grimoire Valentine, Weiss the Immaculate	PS2	
2006	Samurai Warriors 2	Uesugi Kenshin, Tokugawa Ieyasu	PS2, also Xtreme Legends	
2006	Kishin Hishou Demonbane	Titus	PC	
2006	Valkyrie Profile 2: Silmeria	Aegis, Alm, Woltar, Ehrde, Falx, Adonis	PS2	
2006	Xenosaga Episode III: Also Sprach Zarathustra	Margulis	PS2	
2007	Kingdom Hearts II Final Mix+	Luxord	PS2	
2007	Eternal Sonata	Jazz	360, PS4	
2007	ASH: Archaic Sealed Heat	Bamyganant	DS	
2007	The Legend of Heroes: Trails in the Sky the 3rd	Giliath Osborne	PC, PSP, PS3, PS Vita	
2007	Guilty Gear 2: Overture	Sol Badguy	Xbox 360, PC	
2008	Soulcalibur IV	Algol		
2008	Castlevania Judgment	Dracula	Wii	
2009	Kingdom Hearts 358/2 Days	Luxord	NDS	
2009	Samurai Warriors 3	Uesugi Kenshin, Tokugawa Ieyasu	PS2	
2010	Xenoblade Chronicles	Sorean	Wii, 3DS	
2011	Marvel vs. Capcom 3: Fate of Two Worlds	Albert Wesker	PS3, Xbox 360	
2011	Ultimate Marvel vs. Capcom 3	Albert Wesker	PS3, Xbox 360	
2011	The Legend of Heroes: Trails to Azure	Giliath Osborne	PSP, PS Vita, PS4, PC, Nintendo Switch, PS5, Nintendo Switch 2	
2011	Frontier Gate	Guild Master, Protagonist	PSP	
2012	Soulcalibur V	Algol	PS3, 360	
2012	Bravely Default	Fiore de Rosa	3DS	
2013	Sonic Lost World	Zavok	Wii U, Nintendo 3DS, PC	
2013	The Legend of Heroes: Trails of Cold Steel	Giliath Osborne	PS Vita, PS3, PC, PS4, Nintendo Switch	
2014	Guilty Gear Xrd -SIGN-	Sol Badguy	Arcade, PC, PS3, PS4, also -REVELATOR-	
2014	Samurai Warriors 4	Tokugawa Ieyasu		
2014	Resident Evil HD Remaster	Albert Wesker	Windows, PS3, PS4, Xbox 360, Xbox One	
2014	The Legend of Heroes: Trails of Cold Steel II	Giliath Osborne	PS Vita, PS3, PC, PS4, Nintendo Switch	
2015	Final Fantasy XIV: Heavensward	Varis	PC, PS3, PS4	
2015	JoJo's Bizarre Adventure: Eyes of Heaven	Enrico Pucci	PS3, PS4	
2015	Dead or Alive 5 Last Round	Leon		
2015–2016	Fate/Grand Order	Old Man of the Mountain / King Hassan, Grigori Rasputin	Mobile game	
2015	Seiyu's Life!	Western Detective sound director	Ep. 11	
2016	Resident Evil Zero HD Remaster	Albert Wesker	Windows, PS3, PS4, Xbox 360, Xbox One	
2016	Persona 5	Sojiro Sakura	PS4	
2016	World of Final Fantasy	Tonberry	PS4, PS Vita, PC, Nintendo Switch, Xbox One	
2017	Nier: Automata	Terminal Alpha, Terminal Beta	PS4, PC	
2017	Nioh	Date Shigezane	PS4; DLC-only	
2017	Overwatch	Doomfist	PC, PS4	
2017	Sonic Forces	Zavok	PS4, Xbox One, Nintendo Switch, PC	
2017	The Legend of Heroes: Trails of Cold Steel III	Giliath Osborne	PS4, PC, Nintendo Switch, PS5	
2018	Sdorica	Crushfang, Theodore Carlos	Android, iOS	
2018	Crystar	Heraclitus	PS4, PC	
2018	The Legend of Heroes: Trails of Cold Steel IV	Giliath Osborne	PS4, PC, Nintendo Switch, PS5	
2019	Kingdom Hearts III	Luxord	PS4	
2019	Teppen	Albert Wesker	Android, iOS	
2020	Kingdom Hearts III Re Mind	Luxord, Driver	PS4	
2021	Final Fantasy VII Remake Intergrade	Weiss	PS5	
2021	Guilty Gear -STRIVE-	Sol Badguy	Arcade, PS4, PS5, PC	
2021	The King of Fighters All Star	Sol Badguy	Android, iOS	
2022	Return to Shironagasu Island	Vincent Swift	Nintendo Switch, PC	
2023	Octopath Traveler II	Osvald V. Vanstein	PS4, PS5, Nintendo Switch, PC	
2022	Crisis Core: Final Fantasy VII Reunion	Weiss	Nintendo Switch, PC, PS4, PS5, Xbox One, Xbox Series X/S	
2023	Resident Evil 4	Albert Wesker	PS4, PS5, PC, Xbox Series X/S	

=== Drama CDs ===
Series	Role	Notes	Source
Bakuretsu Hunter	Saiba Isui		
Nura: Rise of the Yokai Clan	Gyuki		
Lodoss Tou Senki Kaze to Honoo no Majin	Jin		
Planet Ladder	Ido		
Unbreakable Machine-Doll	Sigmund		

=== Live action ===
Year	Series	Role	Notes	Source
1979	Kusa Moeru	Nitta Tadatsune	Taiga drama	
1981	Onna Taikōki	Maeda Toshinaga	Taiga drama	
1983	Tokugawa Ieyasu	Ōkubo Tadakazu	Taiga drama	
1984	Sanga Moyu	Yasuhide Kurihara	Taiga drama	
1986	Choushinsei Flashman	Sir Cowler	Actor, Eps. 15 - 48	
1987	Hikari Sentai Maskman	Guron Doguler	Ep. 34	
1988	Choujuu Sentai Liveman	Great Professor Bias	Actor	
1991	Super Rescue Solbrain	David Kosugi	Actor - Ep. 20	
2010	Kamen Rider OOO	Narration, Birth Driver Voice, Birth Buster Voice	Main Eps (Narration), Eps. 16 - 48 (Birth Driver Voice, Birth Buster Voice)	
2011	Kaizoku Sentai Gokaiger	Great Scientist Zaien	Ep. 30	
2014	Kamen Rider Gaim	Roshuo	Eps. 27 - 41	
2014	Kamen Rider Gaim: Great Soccer Battle! Golden Fruits Cup!	Roshuo	Movie	
2016	Doubutsu Sentai Zyuohger	Azald	Eps. 1 - 45 (Azald), 28, 45 - 46 (Azald Legacy)	
2017	Doubutsu Sentai Zyuohger vs. Ninninger the Movie: Super Sentai's Message from the Future	Azald	Movie	
2019	Kishiryu Sentai Ryusoulger	Tankjo	Eps. 1 - 6, 21 - 22	
2019	Kishiryu Sentai Ryusoulger the Movie: Time Slip! Dinosaur Panic	Tankjo	Movie	
2021	Kikai Sentai Zenkaiger	Great King Bokkowaus		

=== Dubbing roles ===
==== Film ====
Year	Series	Role	Voice dub for	Notes	Source
1996	Thunderbolt	Warner "Cougar" Krugman	Thorsten Nickel		
1998	Wishmaster	The Djinn / Nathaniel Demerest	Andrew Divoff		
2000	American Beauty	Buddy Kane	Peter Gallagher	Home video edition	
2001	Exit Wounds	Sergeant Lewis Strutt	Michael Jai White	Home video edition	
2004	Crusader	Brechner	Richard Tyson		
2005	Ronin	Vincent	Jean Reno	TV Asahi edition	
2007	300	Leonidas I	Gerard Butler		
2007	Transporter 2	Gianni Chellini	Alessandro Gassmann	TV Asahi edition	
2008	The Chronicles of Narnia: Prince Caspian	Glenstorm the Centaur	Cornell John		
2009	The Strangers	Man in the Mask	Kip Weeks		
2012	Machine Gun Preacher	Sam Childers	Gerard Butler		
2012	Men in Black 3	Boris the Animal	Jemaine Clement		
2014	Enough Said	Albert	James Gandolfini		
2018	Jurassic World: Fallen Kingdom	Benjamin Lockwood	James Cromwell		
2019	Spider-Man: Far From Home	Dimitri Smerdyakov	Numan Acar		

==== TV series ====
Year	Series	Role	Voice dub for	Notes	Source
1998–2004	Sex and the City	Mister Big	Chris Noth		
2010–19	The Good Wife	Peter Florrick	Chris Noth		
2016–17	Outcast	Byron Giles	Reg E. Cathey		
2021	And Just Like That...	Mister Big	Chris Noth		
2022	The Lost Symbol	Peter Solomon	Eddie Izzard		

==== Animation ====
Year	Series	Role	Voice dub for	Notes	Source
2000	Dinosaur	Kron	Samuel E. Wright		
2004	Watership Down	Bigwig	Stephen Mangan		
2014	Big Hero 6	General	Abraham Benrubi		
2015	The Book of Life	Xibalba	Ron Perlman		
2018	The Emoji Movie	Mel Meh	Steven Wright		

=== Other dubbing ===
- Macne Nana series app – Macne Papa
