= List of Solty Rei episodes =

The following is a list of episodes for the anime series SoltyRei, originally aired from October 6, 2005, to March 30, 2006, and one OVA episode special. Extra Episode(25 - 26) was a double feature-length episode and it was released on the final volume of the Japanese DVD collection in July 2006. Extra Episode (OVA) has also been aired on Animax when it premiered in the Southeast-Asia region.

== Episode list ==
No.	Title	Original release date
1	"The City Where The Aurora Falls"; Transliteration: "Ōrora no Furu Machi" (Japanese: オーロラの降る街)	October 6, 2005
Roy Revant is a bounty hunter and is tracking a man named Dale Boyd. However, after apprehending Dale, Roy is then targeted by Dale's partner, Grey Walker. When things are looking grim for Roy, all of a sudden he is saved by a girl who actually is a full-body Resemble (cyborg) who begins following him on the street. Who is this girl?
2	"A New Dawn"; Transliteration: "Atarashii Asa" (Japanese: 新しい朝.)	October 13, 2005
It seems that Miranda Maverick has made an enemy and is lucky to have been saved by Roy after an assassination attempt. Roy's now her bodyguard, protecting her from the unknown threat, but that night Roy seems to have an unwelcomed guest in his apartment. It turns out to be the same girl from before, the girl who has saved his life twice now. Also, government officials come to take away the girl since she is an unregistered citizen.
3	"The Girl In Blue"; Transliteration: "Ao no Shōjo" (Japanese: 青の少女)	October 20, 2005
Roy is given the job of protecting a briefcase from theft by the infamous Anderson brothers for the city hospital's director. At the same time, he brings in the Resemble girl, now named Solty, to the hospital for a physical before she gets her official ID issued. During the physical the technician makes a startling discovery. Roy is able to successfully protect the case when an attempt is made on it, but the Anderson brothers escape, and the director decides to hire more bounty hunters to transport the case the next day. During the transport, the Anderson brothers easily take out each of the hunters except for Roy, but the person who successfully steals the case is their sister who was disguised as the director's secretary.
4	"Friend" (Japanese: friend)	October 27, 2005
From the information gathered from Solty's previous physical, Yuto has discovered that she is 100% Resemble without a trace of human within. Soon after this Solty heads out for her morning walk when she meets a lost girl, Meril, and they become friends after Solty was able to help her find her way home. Meanwhile the PROCEED Team seem to be tracking down some Condemned Prisoner, but he manages to escape. Maybe he'll prove to become very troublesome later on.
5	"Waterside Panic"; Transliteration: "Wōtāsaido Panikku" (Japanese: ウォーターサイド·パニック)	November 3, 2005
When Rose breaks into a gallery to steal an emerald worth millions she trips the security alarm and is forced to stash it somewhere and what better place to do it than the local hot spring across the road. She takes up a job there to recover it the next day but unfortunately for her the R.U.C.'s elite team, Sylvia, Celica, and Accela, are taking one of their only days off at the same hot spring where the emerald is being hidden. By coincidence, Roy, Miranda, Kasha, Yuto, and Solty are also there.
6	"Beloved Daughter"; Transliteration: "Manamusume" (Japanese: 愛娘(まなむすめ))	November 10, 2005
Roy receives a job to apprehend a man who's an Unregistered Citizen. This person has stolen very rare P-10 crystals, which are capable of turning light into energy. However Roy receives some news of his own, news that his daughter has been found. Will he finally meet his daughter who has been missing since the Blast Fall disaster?
7	"A Little Blue Demon Comes To Visit"; Transliteration: "Koakuma no Hōmon" (Japanese: 小悪魔の訪問)	November 17, 2005
Roy's day doesn't seem to be going well from the very beginning when he gains another unwelcome roommate, and this time it's Rose Anderson. It turns out that the police have found their hideout and she got separated from her brothers, but it may seem that she has an ulterior motive.
8	"Revenge"; Transliteration: "Ribenji" (Japanese: リベンジ)	November 24, 2005
Rose is still living with Solty and Roy at his apartment, with Roy still unable to get rid of her. While there Rose seems to be scouting Solty to join her and her brothers in their bandit acts and determined as she is, she was given three days, by her older brother Larry, to make Solty into a thief. But plans seem to change when Rose sees a familiar face.
9	"Girls Day Off"; Transliteration: "Otometachi no Kyūjitsu" (Japanese: 乙女達の休日)	December 1, 2005
All the girls from the R.U.C. government organization seem to have the day off. Meanwhile, Rose seems to be bored 'cause everyone else is doing their own thing, so she goes out for a walk only to bump into the same stranger from the park as before, Ashley. They end up going on a date but are spotted and tailed by some familiar faces.
10	"Treasure and Rescue"; Transliteration: "Torejā & Resukyū" (Japanese: トレジャー&レスキュー)	December 8, 2005
Roy, Solty, and Rose are pursuing a criminal through some abandoned areas of the city, when all of a sudden the floor collapses trapping Solty and Rose in the underground city complex below. But no need to fret, the Resemble Rescue Team (RRT) has arrived, a special rescue team with each member having a special resemble parts for their role. However things begin to complicate their rescue attempt.
11	"Birthday Game"; Transliteration: "Bāsudē Gēmu" (Japanese: バースデーゲーム)	December 15, 2005
Roy's birthday is nearing and he is unaware of what the cheerful, excited Solty is planning for him. Meanwhile the PROCEED Team are at the scene of crime where a R.U.C. Resemble researcher was murdered by Hou Chuu, who seems to be committing gruesome crimes involving explosives. It seems that this same person has a grudge on Roy and has begun his sick, twisted game.
12	"Tears: After the Showdown"; Transliteration: "Kechaku no Hateni -na-mi-da-" (Japanese: 決着の果てに-na-mi-da-)	January 12, 2006
Hou Chuu has captured Rose and wants Roy to come and get her, alone; and sets a multiple bomb traps inside an abandoned building. Also Andy is in hospital after surviving a bomb blast, however he and Larry may have discovered something about Rose during their own private investigation. There seems to be a connection between Roy and Rose, but will Rose live to find out?
13	"Distance"; Transliteration: "Surechigai" (Japanese: distance(すれ違い))	January 19, 2006
After the major developments on the previous day, things begin very awkwardly at breakfast. Rose is still unable to accept that Roy is most likely her father, even though all the facts point to it being true. Meanwhile Yuto's friend and researcher, Jeremy Kolbel seems to be conducting some experiments to end R.U.C.'s monopoly on energy supply. Roy and Solty are on a pursuit to stop Jeremy performing her experiment. Meanwhile, Rose was on her way to home from shopping when she saw Roy heading towards the tower and chased after him. On the rooftop, Roy talks to his daughter on the ground while Solty tries to stop Jeremy's experiment. But the experiment fails, causing the clock tower to collapse from lightning strike, killing Rose in the process and almost triggering a second Blast Fall.
14	"Heavy Hearts"; Transliteration: "Kokoro Ōu Yami no Tameni..." (Japanese: 心覆う闇のために...)	January 26, 2006
The sudden loss of Roy's daughter Rita Revant/Rose Anderson in the clock tower accident, affects everyone, though some more than others. Roy has taken the news the worse and starts to take it out on those around him and himself. Solty is chased off by his anger and runs away. Jeremy, who caused the accident, has managed to survive and is recovering in the hospital, although bad things may happen if Roy finds out.
15	"Safe Haven"; Transliteration: "Tadoritsuita Basho" (Japanese: たどり着いた場所)	February 2, 2006
Solty is wandering a desolate environment where she collapses but is found by a young boy, Will. He befriends Solty later and convinces her to help him with a project he's doing, while also trying to help Solty with her problem. Yuto is still struggling to find Solty's whereabouts, but Roy is still in a deep depression over the loss of his daughter.
16	"Half Kidding"; Transliteration: "Jōdan Desu, Hanbun" (Japanese: 冗談です, 半分)	February 9, 2006
Will has died after his poor health caused a terrible plane accident and Joseph finally reveals Will's past to Solty. A flashback hits that Joseph used to work with Ashley, and may have been involved in the cause of the Blast Fall. Roy has finally snapped out of his depressive state after receiving a scolding from Miranda. Meanwhile the girls seem to feel that Ashley's been acting strangely, colder than usual. What is he up to?
17	"Lady"; Transliteration: "Redī" (Japanese: LADY(レディー))	February 23, 2006
Rose has been revealed to be alive and is now a member of the R.U.C's PROCEED Team - and is now the leader of it; Sylvia cannot accept this and is harboring jealous feelings towards Rose. Roy arrives at the house in the desert looking for Solty. Accela and Celica both get fired and Sylvia goes to confront Ashley. After Ashley reveals that he selectively altered Sylvia's genes and that Rose was by far superior to her, he kills Sylvia. Then both are witnessed by the other PROCEED members at shock.
18	"Welcome Home"; Transliteration: "Okaerinasai" (Japanese: おかえりなさい)	March 2, 2006
After a long day searching for Solty, Roy returns home only to find that she is already there. While Solty and Roy are getting back to their usual routine, Integra, Accela, and Celica have been framed for the murder of Sylvia. As they try to prove their innocence, Celica has other things on her mind: revenge.
19	"All Together"; Transliteration: "Zenin Shōgō!" (Japanese: 全員集合!)	March 9, 2006
Roy and Solty meet Rose for the first time since the accident and are dumbfounded to see her alive and well and working for the R.U.C. A news broadcast reveals that Celica was shot and killed resisting arrest for the murder of Sylvia. Later everyone gathers at Roy's apartment to search for answers, and while there Integra and Accela watch a heart-felt video recording of Celica. Back in the R.U.C. headquarters, Roy tries to get Rose to come home but she refuses and Ashley prevents him from talking to her while threatening his life. Back at Roy's apartment, Joseph leaves a message on the answering machine and Integra recognizes the voice. A flashback shows her and the other PROCEED members as children in a room with Joseph and Ashley arguing about their method for augmenting genes. Ashley seems to trust Rose enough to let her in on a very important secret.
20	"Catastrophe Calls"; Transliteration: "Otozureru Wazawai" (Japanese: 訪レル災い)	March 16, 2006
After hearing the message on the phone from Joseph, Integra heads out to do a little investigation of her own. She finds the original, now abandoned, PROCEED lab where her and the other members' genes were modified. Ashley runs into Solty and refers to her as "DK" hinting that they have a history. Later Miranda and Kasha find Solty deactivated in a dumpster and take her back to the apartment. Yuto and Andy went to Joseph's house to look for Integra but find it destroyed. Joseph turns up at Roy's apartment and helps to repair and turn back on Solty. Integra made her way back to Roy's apartment, gives the package Joseph sent to Accela, and then knocks her out. When Solty comes back online, she refers to herself as DK to Joseph, who is surprised to hear a name he knows, before shutting off again. Integra takes the van with power suits and assaults R.U.C. while Joseph explains to everyone in Roy's apartment that he worked on the PROCEED project. He explains that the Blast Fall put thousands of nano machines into the air, making the Aurora Shell, and that when certain girls were exposed to them altered their DNA making them superhuman but also fragile, thus requiring enhancements to survive. He also tells them that the Aurora Shell acts as a barrier keeping the air in the atmosphere, and without it this planet would not be habitable. Humans moved to this planet, and built the Aurora Shell to survive, which surprises everyone. Back at the R.U.C., Ashley reveals to Integra that he has built a ship to leave the planet, and that the first one he built failed 12 years ago, thus confirming the suspicion that he caused the Blast Fall. They fight and Ashley wins, deciding to use her as bait to get to Accela. Meanwhile Miranda goes to visit Rose to convince her to come back home, but all Miranda gets in return is a warning that they are being watched. There also seems to be a connection between Solty and Ashley Lynx, but what could it be?
21	"The Time for Truth"; Transliteration: "Shinjitsu no Toki" (Japanese: 真実の刻)	March 23, 2006
The R.U.C special forces which were stationed outside to watch them are now on the move, about to apprehend them all. Before the special forces reach Roy's apartment they all managed to escape into the underground city, with the help of Joseph. Joseph explains that the underground city was the first city built when humans arrived on this planet, before there was breathable air. It was built by taking apart the ship the colonists came on, and after the Aurora Shell was made everyone left for the surface. Joseph reveals that Solty was built using the materials from the underground city, or rather the old colonist ship. A news report explains that Integra was arrested and that Roy, Miranda, Yuto, Larry, and Andy all have arrest warrants for being Accela's accomplices. Joseph explains that the central computer to the city is called Eunomia, and it controls everything; power, water, etc. It was designed to ensure humanity's survival by controlling everything, but R.U.C. was created to control the population for Eunomia. Thus it was Eunomia that created the registration system that resulted in unregistered citizens suffering daily as way to control the population size. Meanwhile, Ashley Lynx finally reveals the true purpose of PROCEED experiment: to be free from Eunomia's control and take over using Rose as the perfect PROCEED to do the job. Ashley tells Rose that the Resemble technology is directly linked to Eunomia, and that it is trying to use it to fully take control of humanity directly. He also reveals that he is over 200 years old and helped in creating the registration system, but wants to undo it. Accela now understands that Ashley wants to use Rose to directly interface with Eunomia to hack into it and turn it off. In response to the hacking threat from Rose, Eunomia used her link to manipulate Resembles under her control, putting the city into a state of panic as those with Resemble parts start attacking those without. Accela takes control of Hilga, the gargantuan vessel hovering above R.U.C., in an attempt to destroy the relay antenna on the R.U.C. stop stop Euonmia's control over those with Resemble implants. However, while interfacing with the vessel she goes insane and starts blowing up parts of the city left and right.
22	"Three Girls, Three Intentions"; Transliteration: "Watashi to Kanojo to, Shōjo no Omoi" (Japanese: わたしと彼女と, 少女の思い)	March 30, 2006
The city is in chaos; Resembles are out of control, Hilga is destroying everything in its path, Roy, Andy and Larry are on a race against time to halt Eunomia's activity while Solty, finally gaining the ability to levitate, confronts Axela to stop the destruction. Accela fires her beam cannon, landing a hit on Solty. Rose appears in the nick of time to save Solty from falling. Rose tries to kill Accela only for Solty to intervene. Accela self-destructs Hilga to stop the beam cannon from firing on Rose and Solty. Meanwhile, Roy and Andy make it in time to put Eunomia on a stand-by mode only to face-off again with Ashley.
23	"Final Message"; Transliteration: "Saigo no Kotoba" (Japanese: Farewell Message(最後のコトバ))	March 30, 2006
The episode begins with a short flashback of Ashley and Illumina but it doesn't take long for it to go back to the events going on between Ashley and Roy. Ashley reveals to Roy, Eunomia and the events that led to the Blast Fall, 12 years ago. Ashley explains that as he was helping to build the underground city the ships carrying colonists stopped coming down to the planet's surface from the Orbitor. Joseph was also there, and refers to Eunomia, which tells them to keep building the city. While Ashley is concerned with Illumina, his wife, on the Orbitor a large pipe breaks and falls on him. He became the first person to undergo Resemble surgery directly from Eunomia, and as a result he stopped aging and created the R.U.C. and has always been the head of it. Once the Aurora Shell was put in place, Ashley tried to send a ship up to the Orbitor to find out what happened, but it got destroyed in the lightning. Twelve years ago, he tried to go into space on his own, after removing all his Resemble parts, but before he could take off a bolt of lightning from the Aurora Shell hit and destroyed the old R.U.C. building causing the Blast Fall. Eunomia saved him again. Suddenly, Rose and Solty crash in from nowhere and confront Ashley. Ashley merges himself with Eunomia and forces Roy to choose which one of the girls will die. Roy refuses to kill either of the people he considers his daughters and tries to kill Ashley, who in turn impales Roy. Witnessing their father being pierced by Eunomia's/Ashley's tentacle, they go berserk, causing Eunomia to break free from Ashley. Ashley faces off against Solty and Rose, and as he about to kill Solty Roy hits him with the mini grenade launcher on his pistol. Ashley turns and tries to kill him, and to prevent that Eunomia impales Ashley. As he lay dying, Solty tells him that everyone on the Orbitor died. All Ashley wanted was to see Illumina again, and Solty gives Ashley a message from her just before he dies. Solty goes over to Eunomia and turns it off, telling her "sister" good night. Accela and Integra wake up in a hospital alive and well, and the city starts to rebuild. Solty interfaces with Eunomia one more time and finds out that it communicated with Eirena, the computer on the Orbitor, and is going to crash it into the city to wipe out humanity.
24	"The Future"; Transliteration: "Korekara" (Japanese: これから)	March 30, 2006
With news of Eirena (one of the 3 core computers) and the migration vessel about to destroy the city, everyone on the surface has evacuated to the underground city. The R.U.C is planning some sort of mission to destroy the migration vessel before it falls to the city; Solty is a part of that plan. She takes Rose's power suit and Ashley's second ship and goes to meet Eirena. Once in orbit, Solty's ship gets destroyed by Eirena. Eirena expresses that Solty/DK's view that humanity can survive on its own is illogical and that both her and Eunomia lost their minds. As they engage in a fight (Solty flying through her levitation, and Eirena using the Orbitor's rail-guns) Solty explains that when Eirena and her found out Eunomia was out of control, Solty (DK) was sent down to the surface to figure out what happened. However, Solty realized that it was Eirena who caused the Blast Fall when she fired on Ashley's first ship through the Aurora Shell. Eirena felt she was preserving humanity by doing so because a very deadly and unknown virus had spread throughout the Orbitor colony ship and killed everyone on it. Eirena was preventing the virus from spreading to the colony on the surface. Solty forces her way onto the ship and sacrifices herself to destroy the core and the ship with it. Five years later Rose is running for election, and Roy and Yuto have built a ship and gone into orbit to search through the debris to find Solty. Roy finds her and takes her back home.
OVA	"Opportunities Missed, Love Shared"; Transliteration: "Surechigau Kimochi de, Omoi Au Kokoro de" (Japanese: すれ違うキモチで, 想い合うココロで.)	July 26, 2006
This is a two part story that happened after Rose moved into Roy's apartment. During the preparations for Appreciation Day, Solty watches people in the city going about and preparing for the celebration and is confronted with a thought: what is true happiness? While trying to understand happiness and the complexity of human emotions, a young girl who has had a falling out with her mother confronts Solty and Rose asking for their help. Love Shared is actually the second half of Opportunities Missed, while Opportunities Missed shows the entire story.
