= Solty Rei =

Japanese anime television series

- Key visual of the series
- Genre: Adventure; Post-apocalyptic
- Created by: Shuzilow.HA / Gonzo (planning and original concept)
- Anime television series
- Directed by: Yoshimasa Hiraike
- Written by: Noboru Kimura
- Music by: Toshiyuki Omori
- Studio: Gonzo; AIC
- Licensed by: Crunchyroll
- Original network: TV Asahi
- English network: SEA: Animax Asia; US: Funimation Channel, Crunchyroll Channel; ZA: Animax
- Original run: October 7, 2005 – March 31, 2006
- Episodes: 24 + 1 OVA
- Manga

Solty Rei: Aka no Shukujo
- Written by: Noboru Kibuya
- Illustrated by: Takimiya Kazutaka
- Published by: Ichijinsha
- Magazine: Comic Rex
- Original run: December 9, 2005 – April 8, 2006
- Volumes: 1
- icon

Solty Rei is a Japanese anime television series animated by Gonzo and AIC following the inhabitants of a city where an Aurora prevents aerial travel. The series aired on TV Asahi from October 2005 to March 2006.

In April 2006, Funimation confirmed at Anime Expo that it had the rights to distribute Solty Rei. In January 2009, the series made its North American television debut on the Funimation Channel.

== Media ==
=== Anime ===
Produced by Gonzo and AIC, and directed by Yoshimasa Hiraike, Solty Rei was broadcast for 24 episodes on TV Asahi from October 7, 2005, to March 31, 2006. Megumi Hinata (under the name "meg rock") performed the opening theme "Clover", while Tomoe Ohmi performed the ending themes "Float ~Sora no Kanata de~" (Float ～空の彼方で～, Furōto Sora no Kanata de) and "Return to Love".

Madman Entertainment acquired the rights for distribution of the series in Australia and New Zealand, and released it on six DVD volumes between August 15, 2007, and January 23, 2008. A complete collection, including the OVA as episodes 25 and 26, was released on September 17, 2008.

=== Manga ===
A manga adaptation, titled Solty Rei: Aka no Shukujo (SoltyRei―赤の淑女―, "Solty Rei: The Red Lady"), illustrated by Takimiya Kazutaka, was serialized in Ichijinsha's Monthly Comic Rex from December 9, 2005, to April 8, 2006. A collected tankōbon volume was released on June 9, 2006.

=== Other media ===
A fanbook, Solty Rei: Visual Fanbook (SoltyRei ビジュアルファンブック, Soruti Rei Bijuarufanbukku), was released by Ichijinsha on July 29, 2006.

== Reception ==
Hyper comments that "Studio Gonzo are famous for using computer-generated elements along with their traditional cell animation, and this same technique is used fairly frequently on Solty Rei. The hand drawn animation is nicely done and the CGI is good too". Hyper criticises the CGI graphics showing "the strings" in many sequences that use CGI, "which can be an unwelcome distraction".

== Sources ==
- Johnston, Chris. "Solty Rei volume 1". Newtype USA. 6 (1) p. 149. January 2007. ISSN 1541-4817.
