= Guilty Gear Dust Strikers =

2006 video game

- Developer: Arc System Works
- Publishers: JP: Arc System Works; NA: Majesco; EU: THQ
- Series: Guilty Gear
- Platform: Nintendo DS
- Release: NA: April 25, 2006; JP: October 5, 2006; EU: August 3, 2007; AU: August 23, 2007
- Genre: Fighting game
- Modes: Single player, Multiplayer

Guilty Gear: Dust Strikers (ギルティギア ダストストライカーズ, Giruti Gia Dasuto Sutoraikāzu), or Guilty Gear DS, is a fighting game of the Guilty Gear series for the Nintendo DS. Modeled after Guilty Gear Isuka, its gameplay allows up to four player fights. It was the first versus fighting game for the Nintendo DS to be released outside Japan.

Guilty Gear: Dust Strikers is also the first Guilty Gear game so far to have mini-games, ranging from the Balance Game where the player must help a chibi Jam balance the falling items with her plate, to Venom's Billiards, which puts the player and opponent in a pool-style game. The boss of the game's Story and Arcade modes is Gig, an immense insect-like monster with an angel attached to its bottom half. The game has 21 playable characters in all, but only twenty story modes, as Robo-Ky has no story mode.

== Characters ==
- Sol Badguy
- Ky Kiske
- May
- Millia Rage
- Axl Low
- Jam Kuradoberi
- Potemkin
- Chipp Zanuff
- Eddie
- Baiken
- Faust
- Testament
- Anji Mito
- Johnny
- Venom
- Dizzy
- Slayer
- I-No
- Zappa
- Bridget
- Robo-Ky

== Reception ==
Reception

Aggregate scores
| Aggregator | Score |
|---|---|
| GameRankings | 59% |
| Metacritic | 60/100 |

Review scores
| Publication | Score |
|---|---|
| 1Up.com | B− |
| Eurogamer | 3/10 |
| GamePro | 3/5 |
| GameSpot | 5.5/10 |
| GameSpy | 3/5 |
| IGN | 6/10 |
| Nintendo World Report | 7.5/10 |
| X-Play | 3/5 |

Guilty Gear Dust Strikers received "mixed or average reviews", according to Metacritic.
