= Ange =

Ange or Anges may refer to:

== Places ==
- Angé, Loir-et-Cher department, France, a commune
- Ånge Municipality, Västernorrland County, Sweden
  - Ånge, the seat of Ånge Municipality
- Änge, Jämtland County, Sweden, a locality
- Ange (river), Ain, France

== People ==
- Ange (given name), a list of people with the given name or nickname
- Anges Ngapy (born 1963), Congolese former footballer
- Francesco Ange (1675–1757), Italian painter

== Arts and entertainment ==
- Ange (band), French progressive rock band
- Les Anges (film) (fr), French 1973 film
- Les Anges (TV series), French 2011 reality TV series
- Anges (album), by Shunichi Miyamoto
- Ange Ushiromiya, a character from the 07th Expansion visual novel Umineko When They Cry

== Other uses ==
- Ange, a gold coin first issued in France in 1340; see Angel (coin)
- Ånge IF, a Swedish football club based in Ånge, Västernorrland County
- Anges FC, a Togolese football club based in Notsé

== See also ==
- Ainge (surname)
- Angie (disambiguation)
- Angel (disambiguation)
