= Anji =

Anji may refer to:

== Places ==
- Hu Prefecture, known as Anji Prefecture between 1225 and 1276
- Anji County, in Huzhou, Zhejiang, China
- Anji Bridge, or Zhaozhou Bridge, an ancient stone bridge in Hebei, China
- Anji, a village in Balasore (Orissa), India

== Arts and media ==
=== Works ===
- "Anji" (instrumental), a solo acoustic guitar piece composed and recorded by Davey Graham
- Anji (film), 2004 Indian Telugu-language film

=== Fictional people ===
- Anji Kapoor, a character in the Eighth Doctor Adventures
- Anji Mito, a character in the Guilty Gear series of fighting games
- Yūkyūzan Anji, a minor character in Rurouni Kenshin

== People ==
- Anji Hunter (born 1955), political ally of Tony Blair
- Anji Kaneko (1920–2010), Japanese Imperial Army soldier
- Kallam Anji Reddy (Anji Reddy, born 1940), founder of Dr. Reddy's Laboratories, an Indian pharmaceutical company
- Anji Xtravaganza (c. 1960–1993), performer

== Other uses ==
- Anji (Ryūkyū), a historical title and rank in the Ryukyu Islands
- FC Anji Mahachkala, a football (soccer) club in Russia

== See also ==
- Angi (formerly Angie's List), an American home services website
- Angie (disambiguation)
