= Bridget (Guilty Gear) =

Fictional character in the Guilty Gear video game series

- Guilty Gear character
- Bridget from Guilty Gear Strive
- First game: Guilty Gear X2 (2002)
- Created by: Daisuke Ishiwatari
- Voiced by: English: Kelly Ohanian (Strive); Japanese: Hiroko Konishi (X2 to XX Slash); Yukiko Kato (XX Accent Core); Manaka Iwami (Strive)

In-universe information
- Gender: Female
- Weapon: Yo-yo
- Origin: United Kingdom
- Nationality: British

Bridget (Japanese: ブリジット, Hepburn: Burijitto) is a fictional character in Arc System Works's Guilty Gear video game series. Bridget first appeared in the 2002 video game Guilty Gear X2. In the series, Bridget was born male with a twin brother in a village where the birth of same-sex twins is considered bad luck; therefore, Bridget's parents named and raised Bridget as a girl to hide her identity, despite how much it pained them. In her youth, Bridget recognized their pain and set out to be a man and gain great wealth in order to disprove the superstition and to make her parents happy. After disproving the superstition, Bridget found that being a man did not make her happy, and realized that her true self was her desire to live as a woman in accordance with her gender identity.

Bridget was created as "a cute character" by Daisuke Ishiwatari, who wanted to vary the cast of Guilty Gear X2, where she was presented as a cross-dressing but self-identifying boy. Due to the character's appearance, Bridget was initially described as female by video game press. When they became aware of her biological sex, reviewers included Bridget on lists of best androgynous and cross-dressing characters, and debated her sexual orientation. Bridget has become a popular character among gamers, and critics have described her as "a memorable character" in the series. Critics praised her appearance in Guilty Gear Strive in which she realized her identity as a trans woman.

== Conception and development ==
Bridget's original design, when they were intended to be a replacement for the character Kliff Undersn.

Introduced in the 2002 fighting game Guilty Gear X2 by Arc System Works, Bridget's character went through several concepts. Series creator Daisuke Ishiwatari initially intended them to be a replacement Kliff Undersn, a character that had appeared in the first Guilty Gear. He ultimately decided to make the character a cross-dressing boy that spoke with an Osaka accent, wanting "something unconventional" to differentiate Bridget from similar cute designs in other games, and felt it would be interesting. In 2022, when Bridget was added to sequel title Guilty Gear Strive, Ishiwatari redefined the character as transgender, now using female pronouns.

When working on X2, the rest of the development was not informed that she was a male character presenting as female; to avoid them approaching the animations from that context, Ishiwatari instead told them she was " a girl without breasts". To hint at the fact, he gave her in-game character portraits a slightly masculine face, and her androgynous appearance was meant to present a sense of charm. Ishiwatari stated that several times during development he almost abandoned the concept, worried about the potential backlash from incorporating such a character into the game, and as a result went to significant lengths in X2 to emphasize that Bridget was male in the game. The development team stated than when her gender and backstory were actually revealed, it sent shockwaves through the series' fanbase.

Bridget's weapons also went through several designs. One early concept featured a cat-themed oversized toy hammer that would "meow" when it struck an opponent. However, another developer proposed the idea of making a character based on an acquaintance of his, an experienced yo-yoer. Intrigued by the idea of such a weapon in a 2D fighting game due to how it moved, he changed the design entirely, and both bought and practiced with a yo-yo to fully understand the range of movement available. In an interview he joked that he may have spent more time with the yo-yo than drawing. However, as there was some elements he could not adapt to the fighting game character, he gave them a secondary weapon of a teddy bear. The weapon proved very difficult however, resulting in double the normal amount of animation frames due to the yo-yo's movements. He spent "a very long, very frustrating time" trying to get the concept to work, rejecting many versions before studio staff made Bridget "look natural".

=== Design ===
Standing 158 centimetres (5 ft 2 in) tall, Bridget is a feminine young girl with neck-length blonde hair that frames her face. As Ishiwatari developed her character he incorporated various ideas into the design, wanting to express her as "born unequal" in a similar manner to new character Dizzy, but at the same time someone that was happy despite the world assuming they were not. To this end he gave her an "immoral design" of a Catholic nun's outfit, coupled large metal handcuff was placed around her waist to indicate her capability of binding others. Crosses were used on her outfit, though instead of a religious symbol they were meant to represent femininity and her status between genders. The nun's habit was expanded into a cape behind her to obscure the visibility of her movements, though her feet were given a "bare" silhouette to compensate. In terms of personality, Ishiwatari wanted to illustrate Bridget as a comical character, wanting to deal with the life handed to her in a positive manner and show her parents the connections she had made with others.

When she was added to Strive, Ishiwatari wanted to unify Bridget's character design and outfit to give a sense of realism. Ishiwatari tried to avoid the disconnect a viewer would feel when seeing a character walk around in an outfit that cannot be considered normal clothing. One point in her design that he was particular about was the symbol on her head piece. Originally the male symbol ♂, he had clear intention of changing it to a transgender symbol ⚦ for Guilty Gear Strive. When drawing the roughs, where he had already drawn her with the transgender symbol, the person in charge of cleaning up the model sheets accidentally drew her with the old design's symbol, but this mistake was corrected.

== Appearances ==
Bridget was introduced in the third installment of the series, Guilty Gear X2 (2002), where she was presented as a cross-dressing boy wearing a nun's habit. Bridget was assigned male at birth, one of twin brothers named and raised by her wealthy parents as a girl in a British village. They do this to protect her and to hide her cisgender identity, since the other villagers believe that identical twins bring bad luck, and her parents were not willing to give her away. Bridget nonetheless grows up identifying as a boy. She possesses a cheerful and happy personality, which is result of her trying to not worry her parents who, unable to raise her as a boy, were in pain and felt guilt for feeling they are forcing her to live in a certain way. She even took up yo-yoing in order to show that she was happy. However, she realized the more she insisted that she was happy, the more it pained her parents. Bridget came to the conclusion that in order to free her parents from their guilt and to make them happy, she would need to live as a man and to bring home riches to disprove the superstitions. To do this, she becomes a bounty hunter who fights with her yo-yo and Roger (ロジャー, Rojā), Bridget's mechanical, oversized teddy bear. Although she makes one of her first bounties on the Gear Dizzy, she is tricked by I-No in taking fake bounties targeting other cast of characters. In one ending path, she goes to Ky to receive her bounty rewards. He points out that the targets of these fake bounties are innocent but compensates her for her troubles anyway. In a second path, Bridget finds Dizzy with May and the Jellyfish Pirates and tries to capture the Gear. However, after the fight, she finds out that Dizzy is not a bad person and befriends her instead. In the last path, Johnny intervenes and tries to seduce Bridget but soon gets embarrassed after he realized that she is a boy.

In Guilty Gear XX Accent Core Plus (2008), despite working to become an accomplished bounty hunter, all the wanted criminals were already taken care of. In order to make ends meet, she decides to become an entertainer. Although she tries to recruit Venom for his talent at pool and I-No for her ability to play electric guitar, both refuse her suggestion. Without money, in one ending Bridget works as a waitress in Jam Kuradoberi's restaurant. In an alternate ending she returns to her birth village, finds that her twin brother has disappeared, and begins searching for him.

Bridget is also a playable character in the spin-offs Guilty Gear Isuka (2004), Dust Strikers (2006), and Judgment (2006).

In 2022, Bridget returned as a DLC character for Guilty Gear Strive. English promotional material such as the Strive website and Bridget's official moveset guide video avoided referring to Bridget with any pronouns. At this point of time, although she was not able to capture Dizzy for her bounty, she showed great talent as a bounty hunter and managed to successfully bring home a great amount of wealth. Thus, the superstition faded and freed her and her parents from this restriction. But as a result, without her original goal, and after trying to live as a man but with it not feeling right, she is left searching for another purpose. Bridget begins Strive's arcade mode storyline presenting as a boy, as Bridget identified in previous games, but is now questioning this cisgender identity. In conversations with Goldlewis Dickinson and Ky Kiske, Bridget expresses feeling unhappy but afraid of making the wrong choice, and the other characters relate to Bridget by sharing their own experiences of hiding secrets for the sake of others and of having the courage to reveal them and live as one's "true self", drawing a comparison to Bridget hiding her transgender identity. At the end of her hard-difficulty mode story, Bridget comes out as a woman to Goldlewis and Ky.

== Critical reception ==
Bridget has been generally well received by fans and critics alike, both as a Guilty Gear character and in gaming as a whole. Gamasutra's Zoran Iovanovici ascribed Bridget's popularity to the fact that she was feminine despite being presented as a boy, to which Zoran was not surprised by her popularity. In a 2013 poll conducted by Arc System Works, Bridget was voted as the most popular character from the series. Eurogamer called Bridget "one of Guilty Gear's more memorable characters", while Kotaku's Brian Ashcraft, who called her an "iconic character", felt that she was both one of the most memorable characters in Guilty Gear but also gaming. Bridget received a nomination for Best LGBTQ+ Character at the Gayming Awards 2023, but lost to Lor from New Tales from the Borderlands.

Bridget has been the subject of discussion about her gender identity, even before the release of Guilty Gear Strive and confirmation that she is female rather than male, due to her feminine appearance. When she was first revealed for Guilty Gear X2, Game Watch and other sources identified Bridget as female, though the character identified as male at the time. It was clarified a month later that Bridget was a boy. When this was revealed, some fans online were disappointed, having expected a "new cute, playable girl". However, there was a shift in perception, with fans appreciating Bridget for being cute. The phrase "there's no way someone this cute is a girl" originated in a 5ch thread about Bridget, which eventually became a "defining phrase of the otokonoko boom". The phrase "everybody is gay for Bridget" also became a popular saying on the Internet. She was also regarded as a notable example of a cross-dressing character, as well as receiving praise from The Escapist for being a heroic cross-dressing player character, in contrast to more antagonistic cross-dressing and transgender characters, such as Poison.

Critics praised Bridget's storyline in Guilty Gear Strive, in which she struggled with her gender identity and ultimately came out as a trans woman. Bridget's debut as a DLC character for Guilty Gear Strive was her first playable appearance in 10 years. Kenneth Shepard of Fanbyte speculated that her extended absence may have been due to uncertainty over how to address her backstory, which he said was presented with homophobic and transphobic tropes in her prior appearances. Her announcement prompted Josh Tolentino of Siliconera to wonder if the developers planned to change her characterization with respect to gender presentation, noting that her official biography on Arc System Works's website avoided using gendered personal pronouns. Shepard acknowledged the challenge of sorting through Bridget's complicated backstory to tell a respectful coming out narrative. Renata Price of Waypoint drew parallels between Bridget's evolution and the increasing presence and acceptance of queer players in the fighting game community. She found Bridget's circuitous path to self-acceptance to be an asset, calling it "messy and genuine in the way that real queer stories are". Price and Shepard connected Bridget's story to Arc System Works's recent treatment of Testament, who identified as non-binary in a prior DLC for Strive.

=== Misinformation ===
Following her inclusion in Guilty Gear Strive, some fans alleged that Bridget's trans identity was invented by the translation and localization team and was not present in the Japanese version of the game; additional rumors purported that she only comes out as trans in a "bad ending" and identifies as a cisgender man in other endings, with the implication that Goldlewis pressured her into identifying as female. Both claims were refuted by Akira Katano and Daisuke Ishiwatari in their Developer's Backyard blog. Katano stated that "although the difficulty and story dialogue of Arcade Mode change depending on your match results, this doesn't change the main plot, nor are there alternate endings such as 'good' or 'bad' endings. The same goes for other characters' Arcade stories as well", while Ishiwatari reaffirmed that "[a]fter the events of Bridget's story in Arcade Mode, she self-identifies as a woman. So, as to whether 'he' or 'she' would be the correct pronoun for Bridget, the answer would be 'she'." Katano stated that they did expect it to be a topic of discussion and disagreement. However, they saw a lot more people misinterpreting the message they were putting out and asking for clarity. They were conflicted on stating their stance as not doing so invited an irresponsible amount of discussion. On the other hand, they also were opposed to spoiling the conclusion of her story on the official site. But after a forgery came out claiming to be an official Arc System Works response and that Bridget was still male, which was denounced by Arc System Works in an official response soon after, they felt the need to be clear on their position.
