= Guilty Gear Isuka =

2003 2D fighting video game

- North American PlayStation 2 cover featuring Sol Badguy
- Developer: Arc System Works
- Publishers: Sammy Studios: JP: Sammy Studios (Arcade, PS2, Xbox) Sourcenext (Windows); NA: Sammy Studios (PS2); EU: 505 Games (PS2, Xbox) Zoo Digital Publishing (Windows)
- Designer: Masaomi Kikuchi
- Composers: Daisuke Ishiwatari; Tetsuya Ohuchi; Yoshihiro Kusano
- Series: Guilty Gear
- Platforms: Arcade; PlayStation 2 Microsoft Windows; Xbox
- Release: December 17, 2003: Arcade; JP: December 17, 2003 PS2; JP: July 29, 2004; NA: November 2, 2004; EU: June 16, 2005 Windows; JP: November 25, 2005; EU: April 7, 2006; WW: January 16, 2014 (Steam) Xbox; JP: December 16, 2004
- Genre: Fighting
- Modes: Single player, multiplayer
- Arcade system: Atomiswave

Guilty Gear Isuka (Note: Japanese: ギルティギア 鶍, Hepburn: Giruti Gia Isuka) is a 2D fighting video game developed by Arc System Works and published by Sammy Corporation. Announced by Arc in September, it was released on December 17, 2003, in arcades as the sixth installment of the Guilty Gear series. Later, the game was ported for a release on the PlayStation 2 (PS2), Xbox, and Windows in Japan. The PS2 version was brought to North America by Sammy, and, in Europe, the home console version was released by 505 Game Street and the PC version by Zoo Digital Publishing.

While the gameplay remained almost the same as in previous titles, the game introduced a four-player battle mode, and the PS2 and Xbox version included new features to the series, including a scrolling adventure, a customization mode, and two new characters. Guilty Gear Isuka received mixed critical reviews. It was praised for its visual, music and customization features. However, although some aspects of the new gameplay—such as the two fighting planes and the turn button—were praised as original, their implementation was criticized. The removal of features present in previous titles was also not well received by critics.

== Gameplay ==
=== Combat system ===
The basic gameplay system of Guilty Gear Isuka is like the other games in the series. The game uses a four attack button configuration that consists of punch, kick, slash, and high slash. Unlike previous games, it features a "turn" button, since a character does not automatically turn around if its opponent moves to the other side of the screen. Each character (or team) starts a fight with at least a "soul"; when a character life bar is emptied, its life is filled while the player lost a soul. If the life is depleted when the player has no souls, it is defeated. It also features previous installments features like the tension gauge, which allows the player to perform super moves, and the burst gauge, which allows the player to break combinations and super moves.

=== Modes ===
Guilty Gear Isuka is the first game in the series to allow four characters to appear onscreen at the same time. HUD features (from top to down): the character's health, the burst gauge, and the tension gauge. The character's "souls" lie on the side of the burst gauge.

The game introduces a four-player option in Versus Mode, giving a player four characters who can fight two-on-two, three-on-one or everyone-for-themselves. There are two fighting planes, one in the foreground and the other behind it.

Another innovation was Boost Mode: a two-player, side-scrolling, arcade-style beat 'em up mode not included in the arcade version, in which a player fights enemy waves to accumulate items, health and experience. For the Xbox, this mode was adapted for online play with Xbox Live, supporting up to 16 players. Experience points from Boost Mode can be used in the new Robo-Ky II Factory mode, in which a player can customize a robot named Robo-Ky II by teaching him moves, combos, or one of 65 special attacks from other characters. In addition to the attacks, other aspects such as jump height, offense, defense, recovery time, tension, and speed can be improved.

The game also features other modes: Color Edit, a palette swap editor that allows the player to customize nearly every aspect of the characters, including buckles and hair; Training, in which a player can practice with (and against) computer-controlled opponents and Arcade, similar to the survival mode featured in other fighting games.

=== Playable characters ===
Guilty Gear Isuka features twenty playable characters in its arcade version: Anji Mito, Axl Low, Baiken, Bridget, Chipp Zanuff, Dizzy, Eddie, Faust, I-No, Jam Kuradoberi, Johnny, Ky Kiske, May, Millia Rage, Potemkin, Slayer, Sol Badguy, Testament, Venom, and Zappa. Three characters were added to the PlayStation 2 edition: A.B.A, Robo-Ky, and Robo-Ky II.

== Development and release ==
In September 2003, Sammy Corporation announced that a new game dubbed Guilty Gear X Series The Newest Version would be featured at the Japan Amusement Machinery Manufacturers Association (JAMMA) arcade show; at the show, the company revealed that Guilty Gear Isuka would be the game's name. "In Guilty Gear Isuka we want to satisfy existing fighter fans with new content and never-before-seen innovations. We also want to reach out to mainstream fans to show them that, right now, the envelope in fighting games is also being pushed in two dimensions", declared Tim Pivnicny, senior VP of Sammy Studios, Inc. A PlayStation 2 version of the game was announced to be in development on March 3, 2004. An August 24 announcement said that the game would be compatible with Xbox.

Guilty Gear Isuka was released in Japan on December 17, 2003, by Sammy for the Atomiswave arcade cabinets, followed by the PlayStation 2 version on July 29, 2004. An Xbox version was released by Arc System Works on December 16, 2004, and Sourcenext released the game for Windows on November 25, 2005. In North America, Guilty Gear Isuka was released by Sammy for PlayStation 2 on November 2, 2004. In Europe, 505 Games Street released it on June 16, 2005, for PlayStation 2, and the PC version was released on April 7, 2006, by Zoo Digital Publishing (now Zushi Games). In 2007, the game was made compatible with Xbox 360. DotEmu also released Guilty Gear Isuka on its DRM-free shop in April 2011. On January 16, 2014, the game was released on the Steam digital distribution platform for Windows PCs. In 2020, a homebrew conversion was released for the Dreamcast.

== Reception ==
Reception

Aggregate scores
Aggregator	Score
GameRankings	76%
Metacritic	73/100

Review scores
Publication	Score
1Up.com	D+
Famitsu	27/40
Game Informer	6.75/10
GamePro	4.5/5
GameRevolution	B
GameSpot	6.1/10
GameSpy	3/5
IGN	7.2/10

Guilty Gear Isuka was the 176th-bestselling Japanese title in 2004, with 74,270 copies sold for PlayStation 2 as of December 26. It was "Best Fighting Game" at the Best of E3 2004 Awards from IGN, and was nominated for "Best Sequel Fighting" at the 2004 National Academy of Video Game Testers and Reviewers (NAVGTR) Awards, which went to Dead or Alive Ultimate. The game received mixed reviews from critics, with a score of 76% at GameRankings and 73/100 at Metacritic. Allgame's Damian Francis gave the game three-and-a-half stars out of five; Famitsu's four reviewers scored it 7, 7, 6, and 7 (out of 10) respectively, with a total score of 27 out of 40.

Although the introduction of two planes and the turning button were considered good ideas in theory, both features were heavily criticized by reviewers. Jeremy Dunham of IGN, Manny LaMancha of GamePro and Benjamin Turner of GameSpy felt it difficult to fight one-on-one when a player can start a cat-and-mouse game, while GameSpot's Greg Kasavin and Brian Gee of Game Revolution found the features to cause "chaos". Turner said it deprived the player of the ability "to have a normal Guilty Gear X2-style match", and Dunham said the computer reacted faster. David Smith of 1UP.com called it an "irrational control scheme". The perceived poor execution of its new features led GameSpy to give it a special "It Sounded Good on Paper" award.

Conversely, other additions received more positive feedback. Dunham called the Boost and Factory modes "intriguing distractions", while Turner praised the latter for "much depth and nuance", unreached by other games. Kasavin said the Boost Mode gets boring quickly due to the lack of an objective; though Kasavin declared that the Factory Mode "is quite possibly the most interesting part of the gameplay", he criticized how it depends on playing "a mindless side-scroller over and over." The new backgrounds were commended by Dunham, Kasavin and Smith, with the latter saying that Sammy should have saved them for a better game.

The maintenance of aspects from previous titles, including its animation and soundtrack, was praised by Kasavin, Turner, and Gee. Its soundtrack was said to be "the best score in the franchise so far" by Dunham, and was rated among video game soundtracks which "never got the recognition they truly deserve" by Siliconera. LaMancha, however, criticized a lack of improvement of its animation and music compared to its gameplay. The removal of other features from previous titles was criticized: Dunham and Kasavin complained about the lack of a story mode, while Joe Juba of Game Informer said the series had a "magic" until Isuka, criticizing the new additions and the absence of a traditional arcade mode. Isuka was well-rated on balance, but considered inferior to the previous Guilty Gear X2 #Reload.

== Other media ==
=== Music ===
Guilty Gear Isuka Original Soundtrack (Note: ギルティギア イスカ オリジナルサウンドトラック, Giruti Gia Isuka Orijinaru Saundotorakku), composed by Daisuke Ishiwatari, Tetsuya Ohuchi and Yoshihiro Kusano, arranged by Ohuchi and Kusano, was released on CD by Team Entertainment on April 21, 2004. An additional edition was released on iTunes on November 23, 2005; it contains six more tracks, totalizing 26 tracks.

It was well received by critics; Don Kotowski and Harry of Square Enix Music Online rated it 8 out of 10. Kotowski said Ishiwatari is the mainstream in the soundtrack, while Ohuchi and Kusano "somewhat disappoint", qualifying it as "a great album" in overall. Harry said the only thing bad about this album is its "too short" length. Writing for the same site, a reviewer dubbed GoldfishX rated it 7 out of 10, citing "it lacks the depth of previous entries in the series."

=== Books ===
Ichijinsha released two Guilty Gear Isuka manga adaptations under its DNA Media Comics line. The first one, titled Guilty Gear Isuka 4 Koma Kings (Note: ギルティギア イスカ 4コマKINGS, Giruti Gia Isuka Yon Koma Kingusu), is a yonkoma series released on February 25, 2004. The other series is an anthology titled Guilty Gear Isuka Comic Anthology (Note: ギルティギア イスカ コミックアンソロジー, Giruti Gia Isuka Komikku Ansorojī), which was released on March 25 of the same year. Subsequently, on March 30, Guilty Gear Isuka Outlive Encyclopedia (Note: ギルティギアイスカアウトライブエンサイクロペディア, Giruti Gia Isuka Autoraibu Ensaikuropedia) was released by Enterbrain. It is an encyclopedia compiled by Monthly Arcadia, an Enterbrain magazine, which was released along with a DVD with commentaries on the game features. Two guidebooks were released by SoftBank Creative; Guilty Gear Isuka Technical Guide (Note: ギルティギア イスカ テクニカルガイド, Tekunikaru Gaido) and Guilty Gear Isuka Complete Guide (Note: ギルティギア イスカ コンプリートガイド, Konpurīto Gaido) were published on August 9, and on September 6, 2004, respectively.
