= Guilty Gear Strive: Dual Rulers =

- Based on: Guilty Gear Strive by Arc System Works
- Written by: Norimitsu Kaihō; Kō Shigenobu
- Directed by: Shigeru Morikawa
- Voices of: Issei Miyazaki; Jōji Nakata; Yui Ishikawa
- Opening theme: "AXCLUSION" by Ulma Sound Junction
- Ending theme: "Arika" by Nowlu
- Composer: Ryo Takahashi
- Country of origin: Japan
- Original language: Japanese
- No. of seasons: 1
- No. of episodes: 8

Production
- Producers: Ken Miyauchi; Daisuke Kobayashi; Yuuto Utsunomiya; Kei Fukura; Yusuke Onuki
- Cinematography: Daisuke Okumura
- Editor: Hatsumi Hidaka
- Production companies: Sanzigen; Arc System Works

Original release
- Network: Tokyo MX, ABC, BS Shochiku Tokyu, AT-X; Crunchyroll (licensee)
- Release: April 4 – May 24, 2025

Guilty Gear Strive: Dual Rulers (Note: Japanese: ギルティギア ストライヴ: デュアル ルーラーズ, Hepburn: Giruti Gia Sutoraivu: Dyuaru Rūrāzu) is a Japanese anime television series produced by Sanzigen and Arc System Works, based on the Guilty Gear video game series. It continues the storyline of the video game Guilty Gear Strive (2021). The series aired from April to May 2025.

== Plot ==
The plot centers around Gears, which are magical creatures made to advance human evolution. Some gears began fighting against humans, leading to a 100-year-long global conflict known as the Crusades. Years after the Crusades, Ky Kiske, a human, and Dizzy, a gear, are officially getting married, hoping to promote peaceful co-existence between humanity and gears. Their wedding is interrupted by a mysterious person named Unika and anti-gear activist Nerville Hammer. The story follows Ky and Dizzy's son, Sin Kiske, as he tracks down Unika. Other characters from the Guilty Gear series, such as Sol Badguy (now a human), Ramlethal Valentine, Baiken, Johnny, Bridget, and more also play prominent roles in the plot.

It is revealed that Unika was sent from another timeline to aid Nerville in his scheme to kill all Gears with a virus he developed by infecting Sin. Nerville sees Unika as disposable, not only because she is a Gear, but also because she is Sin's alternate future younger sister. Nerville learns that the virus he created is meant to cause the Gears to rampage like in Unika's timeline and the past Crusades. Both Nerville and Unika have been manipulated by Nerville's alternate future self, who becomes a malevolent being. Future Nerville absorbs his past self and attempts to destroy the main timeline. However, Sol uses a bullet he obtained from Dizzy and Ky on the eve of Sin losing control of his Commander Gear cell one. The bullet stabilizes Commander Gear cells without killing them, thus saving Sin, Unika and all other Gears at once. Upon awakening and seeing her friend Bridget critically injured from Future Nerville's attack, Unika is ready to atone for her actions and stop Future Nerville.

The siblings manage to save their parents and defeat Future Nerville, restoring peace. Thanks to encouragement from the U.S. President, Sol comes to terms with his past and ultimately attends the wedding of his daughter, Dizzy, where their relationships becomes publicly known. After the wedding, Unika departs to roam the world like her grandfather, Sol, before serving as a bodyguard in training, per U.S. government jurisdiction.

== Cast ==
The cast of Guilty Gear Strive reprise their roles for Dual Rulers, with the exception of Junichi Endo as President Vernon, who inherits the role following the death of previous actor Kiyoyuki Yanada in 2022.

- Issei Miyazaki as Sin Kiske
- Jōji Nakata as Sol Badguy
- Yui Ishikawa as Unika
- Takeshi Kusao as Ky Kiske
- Kazue Fujita as Dizzy
- Hiromi Igarashi as Jack-O Valentine
- Aya Suzaki as Elphelt Valentine
- Megumi Han as Ramlethal Valentine
- Manaka Iwami as Bridget
- Mayumi Asano as Baiken
- Norio Wakamoto as Johnny
- Keiichi Namba as Axl Low
- Tetsu Inada as Leo Whitefang
- Junichi Endo as President Vernon
- Yasuhiro Mamiya as Nerville Hammer
- Tomokazu Sugita as the narrator

== Production ==
The series was announced on June 14, 2024, on the Twitter account of Arc System Works, after which the studio released a trailer for the series on YouTube. The series aired from April 5 to May 24, 2025, on Tokyo MX and other networks. The opening theme song is "AXCLUSION", performed by rock band ulma sound junction, while the ending theme song is "Arika", by Nowlu. Crunchyroll licensed the series to watch online.

== Episodes ==
No.	Title	Directed by (Note: Production staff information is taken from the ending credits of each episode)	Written by	Storyboarded by	Original release date
1	"Ceremony"; Transliteration: "Shikiten" (Japanese: 式典 -Ceremony-)	Daichi Omori	Norimitsu Kaihō	Kozue Oka, Kenta Sasaki, Kotaro Kobayashi, Yuki Maeda, Chisato Ooshima, Daisuke Suzuki, Shoko Mori & Shigeru Morikawa	April 5, 2025
Ky Kiske and Dizzy are set to be married and hope to establish peaceful relations between humans and Gears going forward. The ceremony is interrupted by a girl named Unika who attacks Dizzy, still seeing Gears as evil. Sol Badguy, Ky, and Dizzy's son, Sin, manage to thwart the assassination attempt at the expense of Ky and Dizzy getting frozen, and must find out who Unika is and why she is doing this.
2	"Belief in Peace"; Transliteration: "Heiwa e no Shinnen" (Japanese: 平和への信念 -Belief in peace-)	Kotaro Ogawa	Kō Shigenobu	Shinpei Ishikawa, Kenta Sasaki, Kotaro Kobayashi, Yuki Maeda, Chisato Ooshima, Daisuke Suzuki, Dong Sujian & Shigeru Morikawa	April 12, 2025
Sol and Sin track down Unika and must prevent her from getting a key from the President of the United States that could kill all Gears.
3	"A Soaring Angel"; Transliteration: "Hane no Haeta Tenshisama" (Japanese: 羽根の生えた天使さま -A Soaring Angel-)	Daichi Omori	Norimitsu Kaihō	Kozue Oka, Kenta Sasaki, Hiroshi Morota, Kotaro Kobayashi, Yuki Maeda, Chisato Ooshima, Daisuke Suzuki & Shigeru Morikawa	April 19, 2025
Sol and Sin follow Unika to a run down city that distrusts Gears in the hope of keeping her from activating her plan. All the while, Sin tries to understand her motives, leading to a confrontation of ideals when they re-encounter & fight each other once more that results in Sin's latent Gear abilities activating.
4	"King of Gears"; Transliteration: "Gia no Ō" (Japanese: ギアの王-King of GEARS-)	Kotaro Ogawa	Norimitsu Kaihō	Kozue Oka, Kenta Sasaki, Hiroshi Morota, Kotaro Kobayashi, Yuki Maeda, Chisato Ooshima, Yuki Ijiri, Futo Suzuki, Akinori Miyahisa & Shigeru Morikawa	April 26, 2025
Unika is found and tended to by Bridget while Sin recovers from the fight, with both starting to reconsider their methods after briefly seeing the others' memories during their fight. Sol and Sin start to reach the conclusion that someone else is backing Unika. Suddenly Sin finds himself dubbed "The King of Gears" after he unwittingly activated the dormant Gears of the area, putting him in an awkward position with this newfound power.
5	"King's Decision"; Transliteration: "Ō no kettei" (Japanese: 王の決定 -King's Decision-)	Daichi Omori, Kotaro Ogawa	Kō Shigenobu	Kotaro Kobayashi, Kozue Oga, Kenta Sasaki, Yuki Ijiri, Futo Suzuki, Shinpei Ishikawa & Shigeru Morikawa	May 3, 2025
6	"Emissary from the Future"; Transliteration: "Mirai Kara no Shisha" (Japanese: 未来からの使者 -Emissary from the Future-)	Daichi Omori, Kotaro Ogawa	Norimitsu Kaihō	Kozue Oga, Kenta Sasaki, Kotaro Kobayashi & Shigeru Morikawa	May 10, 2025
7	"Dark Sun"; Transliteration: "Ankoku no Taiyō" (Japanese: 暗黒の太陽 -Dark Sun-)	Daichi Omori, Kotaro Ogawa	Kō Shigenobu	Kozue Oga, Kotato Kobayashi, Kenta Sasaki, Shinpei Ishikawa & Shigeru Morikawa	May 17, 2025
8	"What Makes You, You"; Transliteration: "Jibun no Katachi" (Japanese: 自分のカタチ -What Makes You, You-)	Daichi Omori, Kotaro Ogawa	Norimitsu Kaihō	Kozue Oga, Kotaro Kobayashi, Kenta Sasaki & Shinpei Ishikawa	May 24, 2025

== Reception ==
Overall reception to the early series was largely positive, with particular praise towards the series' animation and character interactions. Positive reviews pointed out the fusion between 2D and 3D graphics and extensive worldbuilding that the Guilty Gear series is known for. However attention to the first episode was given to the lack of effort put into explaining events that happened prior to the series.

== See also ==
- List of television series based on video games
- List of fighting games
