= List of Guilty Gear characters =

This is a list of characters from the Guilty Gear fighting game series.

== Creation and influences ==
Daisuke Ishiwatari has cited Kazushi Hagiwara's manga Bastard!!, and the fighting game Street Fighter II as influence to the Guilty Gear series. However, he noted that the majority of other fighting games were just recycling the character's same skins or style, and so he wanted every character "to be unique in their own way." Kazuhiko Shimamoto's characters were also noted as an inspiration for the male characters, with Ishiwatari saying they needed to be "chivalrous person-like characters", and citing Anji Mito "the most closest to this type". The female ones, on the other hand, have not followed a standard, with Ishiwatari only remarking that they needed to look like real women.

There are many musical references in the Guilty Gear series, including various characters' names and moves, which were inspired by rock and heavy metal bands like Queen, Guns N' Roses, and Metallica. For instance, the main character, Sol Badguy, was named after Queen's lead vocalist, Freddie Mercury. Both his real name, Frederick, and his last name were influenced by the singer, whose nickname was "Mr. Badguy".

== Introduced in Guilty Gear ==
=== Sol Badguy ===
Voiced by (English): David Forseth (Guilty Gear Xrd – present)
Voiced by (Japanese): Daisuke Ishiwatari (Guilty Gear, X and XX), Hikaru Hanada (Guilty Gear XX Series (story mode only)), Jouji Nakata (Guilty Gear 2 Overture (story mode & alternative voice in Guilty Gear XX Accent Core Plus only) – present)

Introduced in the first installment of the series (1998), Frederick Bulsara was one of the lead scientists of the Gear project, as well as being the prototypical Gear, dating from over a hundred years before the events of the Guilty Gear games. As a prototype, he is immune to the orders of Commander Gears. He was personally acquainted with Asuka R. Kreutz (typically known as That Man) prior to the Crusades. As Frederick, Sol created the "Outrage", which he called a supreme Anti-Gear weapon. The Outrage has eight components called "Jinki" (Godlike Weapons), which greatly amplify their wielders' magical ability. Later, he was himself recruited into the order, as a bounty hunter named Sol Badguy. Sol took part in the Crusades, during which he was a member of the Sacred Order of Holy Knights (Seikishidan), acquiring the nickname "Flame of Corruption" (背徳の炎, Haitoku no Honō). However, he later became disenchanted with the methods of the Sacred Order, and fled the order, taking with him the Fūenken (封炎剣; Fireseal). The theft earned him the enmity of Ky Kiske.

In 2175, Sol faced Justice directly. During the fight, which Justice won, she discovered that Sol was a Gear. Justice attempted to assert her power as a Commander Gear to control Sol, but was unable to do so. Exploiting her confusion and weakness from the fight, the Holy Order, led by Ky, sealed Justice away, bringing the war to an end. However, a Gear named Testament began a plan to free Justice, and to stop it, the Union of Nations held a tournament. The canon stated that Sol was the winner of the Tournament, which also resulted in Justice discovering that Sol was, in fact, Frederick. Justice, in her dying words, commented that she wished that "...the three of us..." could talk one last time, and Sol swore to kill Asuka.

In Guilty Gear X (2000), Sol has three endings, all of which involve a fight against Dizzy, who has a half-million dollar bounty on her head. However, he spares her life in all of them, losing against her in his second ending, and judging that she is not a threat to the world in the other two.

In the subsequent game, Guilty Gear X2 (2002), his story-line involved chasing down I-No. In his first ending, his defeat of I-No led to a direct confrontation with Asuka, who casually deflected all of Sol's attacks, saying that Sol was needed because soon a greater battle than the Crusades will occur. In Sol's second ending, Slayer informed him of the Post-War Administration Bureau's interest in Dizzy. In the third ending, he fought Dizzy, who had been possessed by Necro, after I-No knocked her off the Mayship, and sent Dizzy on her way to meet Johnny and May.

In Guilty Gear XX Accent Core Plus (2008), Sol had two endings. In one, I-No threw him back in time to fight his past self, Order-Sol. After both are weakened from the battle, I-No reappeared to murder Order-Sol, which, in turn, caused Sol's present form to cease existing. In his other ending, the same set of events played out, but Sol's present form, strangely, is unaffected by his past self's death. After escaping the time rift, Ky confronted and engaged him in battle. After the fight, Sol and Ky finally settled their differences and went their separate ways, with Ky asking Sol to promise that they will meet again. Though it was referenced in both Sol and Ky's endings, only Sol's told the events directly after the battle, which implied that Sol was the victor.

In Guilty Gear 2: Overture (2007), Sol Badguy took in a young man named Sin as his apprentice, and traveled the world with him as bounty hunters. During their journey, he met Izuna who told him that a man called Vizel was seeking out and destroying Gears by order of Valentine, and that his next target was the kingdom of Illyria. Sol, Sin, and Izuna go to Illyria and find Ky Kiske trapped with a binding spell. With Dr. Paradigm's help they were able to release him. Eventually, they captured Valentine who transformed herself into a monster. Sol fought her, and after the fight, he found himself in a white space, unable to return. However, he was confronted by That Man, who confirmed that Valentine was a copy of Aria, Sol's former lover. Sol was returned to the real world, where he reunited with his allies.

In Guilty Gear Xrd -SIGN- (2014), Sol continued his journeys with Sin when Ramlethal Valentine declared war on humanity. Working alongside Ky, Sin, Leo Whitefang, and Elphelt Valentine, Sol fought to stop the Conclave from using the Cradle to resurrect Justice and destroy humanity. In the end, Sol and his allies were able to stop Justice from reviving, but Elphelt betrayed them and tried to kill them. She was eventually taken to the Backyard, and Sol, Sin and Ramlethal set out to find her.

In Xrd -REVELATOR- (2016), Sol was confronted by Raven, who told him that That Man needed his help in preventing Elphelt from merging with Justice. Before the final battle against Ariels, Sol attempted to claim he is not related to Dizzy, due to her mother being Justice, who was once Aria. His allies began to theorize his connection with the two female Gears, which caused Ky—Dizzy's husband—and Sol to scream out in horror at the supposed revelation that the two rivals are in-laws. After Ariels' defeat, Jack-O took Elphelt's place and fused with Justice, becoming a reincarnated Aria, and Sol revealed to his allies That Man's true identity—Asuka R. Kreutz.

In the epilogue storyline added in Xrd REV 2 (2017), Sol visited Ky's manor, where he challenged Ky to a duel. As Ky noticed Sol's fighting intent, they took their discussion outside the manor to speak privately. While recalling their days as members of the Sacred Order of Holy Knights, Sol mocked Ky, claiming that he held back every time they fought, despite him not doing so when he battled Gears. He further remarked that Dizzy was a "monster", just like himself, angering Ky, who then entered a frenzied rage and managed to overpower Sol in combat. As Sol lied in a newly-formed crater, Sol explained that he had a score to settle with Asuka, with Ky asking him about it. Unbeknownst to them, at the same time they spoke, Asuka turned himself in to the United States government.

Sol returns as a main protagonist in Guilty Gear -STRIVE- (2021). Despite becoming a legendary hero since the previous event, Sol remains a bounty hunter, now accompanied by a fully recovered Jack-O, and the nation often goes to Ky to message Sol for urgent matters. Having taken a request from a weakened Ariels to stop I-No, Sol realizes that Happy Chaos, a demon-like sorcerer formerly Asuka's mentor known as The Original, possessed Ariels body and had been manipulating events alongside I-No herself. Sol's healing power as a Gear becomes slower, due to being shot by Chaos with the same material which created Nagoriyuki's katanas. He arrives at Washington as guest of the White House during a peace meeting with Asuka, where the Gear Maker is targeted by Chaos and I-No for the possession of the Tome of Origin. Sol's story concludes as he lets Asuka remove the Flame of Corruption from him to restore his humanity. Despite the Flame of Corruption's removal being on a bad timing when Chaos fused with I-No into a godlike being, Sol manages to kill a godlike I-No, with the help of Ky, Axl, and a redeemed Nightless samurai Nagoriyuki. He also saves Jack-O from sacrificing herself to stop I-No, declaring his love for her as Jack-O, not as Aria. With I-No's demise, Sol is officially declared dead by the U.S. government and is given a hero's burial. Now going by his original name, Frederick goes off the grid and opens a shop with Jack-O at the abandoned space station Iseo. However in a midquel season-based anime between third and fourth seasons, Dual Rulers, Sol returns to battle once again where he learn Unika's exact nature as his alternate future granddaughter, then properly comes in term with his past and presents himself at an official wedding of his daughter, Dizzy, thanks to Vernon's encouragement.

He was also a playable character in the spin-off games Guilty Gear Petit (2001), Isuka (2003), Dust Strikers (2006), and Judgment (2006). Along with Ky Kiske, he is one of the only characters to appear in every Guilty Gear game.

=== Ky Kiske ===
Voiced by (English): Sam Riegel (Guilty Gear Xrd -SIGN-), Sean Chiplock (Guilty Gear Strive)
Voiced by (Japanese): Takeshi Kusao

Orphaned at the age of 10 during the Holy War, a 100-year-war between mankind and bio-organic weapons called "Gears", he met the then-commander of the Sacred Order of Holy Knights (Seikishidan), Kliff Undersn. Ky was told to come back after five years of training if he really wanted to fight, and it was what he did. Due to the Undersn's retirement, the 16-year-old Ky Kiske was named the new chief of the Order. With the appointment, he was given the Fuuraiken (封雷剣; Thunderseal Sword), one of the Order's holiest treasures and a weapon that allows the wielder to manipulate lightning. He led them to win, ending the war, and with its aim reached the Order was disbanded. Five years later, Ky entered the International Police Force, where he is the captain.

Ky enters a tournament that will select members for a second Sacred Order of Holy Knights at the start of Guilty Gear (1998) after hearing rumors of the possible resurrection of Justice, a Commander Gear who was in the leadership of the Gears during the Holy War. In Guilty Gear X (2000), Ky hears more rumors of a new Commander Gear that does not wish to harm humans—Dizzy. He sets out to find the flaws of his own concept of justice. In Guilty Gear X2 (2002), he returns to his normal duties as a captain of the IPF after rescuing a beaten Dizzy and entrusting her to Johnny's care. When he returns to work, Ky is thrust into a new conspiracy which includes robot clones of himself—called Robo-Ky (ロボカイ, Robokai)—, a secret organization, I-No, and his rival, Sol Badguy. In its sequel, Guilty Gear XX Accent Core Plus (2008), after discovering Post-War Administration Bureau's interest in Dizzy, Ky abandons his post in the police force to protect Dizzy and help her to control her power, the two of them eventually entering into a romantic relationship.

In Guilty Gear 2: Overture (2007), Ky is the king of Illyria. He has a new sword as he is keeping Dizzy, now his wife, sealed within the Thunderseal to preserve her existence. Having grown much more mature and composed over the years, his rivalry and animosity towards Sol has diminished, having entrusted his half-Gear son, Sin, to Sol. However, he is at constant conflict towards his own ineptitude of being a father and a husband due to his bias regarding Gears.

Ky is a playable character in Guilty Gear Xrd (2014). He entrusts his old friend Leo as his replacement of being a current king of Illriya. After Dizzy's return, his son, Sin begins to call him, "dad", much to Ky's happiness to hear it from his son. In the final chapters of the story mode during the Conclave's ambush in using Justice to attack Illriya, Ky was ambushed and being shot by the Conclave's member, Axus to death. However, Ky gets back on feet immediately to finish Axus. Upon awakened from Axus' fatal shots on him, Ky's left eye becomes red and has a gear mark, originating from a result of his relationship with Dizzy and the birth of Sin, resulting Ky to acquire a Juno Scale Gear Cell through exchanging half of his normal human eye with Sin's half of Gear eye at time after his son's birth. It was explained before revealing himself to have half of a Juno Gear Cell, his hair keeps growing fast many times because of that cells' rapid progress, and was originally meant for Dizzy's return. The main reason why he and Sin switched half of their eye is because his son's Gear power would become even more dangerous at full power. In a standalone sequel -Revelator-/Rev 2, Ky eventually found out Sol, Dizzy and Justice's connections, much to their dismay. Despite his wife being exposed to the public and planning to move somewhere with his family, he is glad to hear the news from a recently cured Elphelt that Dizzy is instead being praised as a savior during a last battle against Sanctus Maximus Ariels. Ky, who is very displeased with Sol's parenting of Sin, intercepts Sol to discuss something with him privately outside the manor. Sol provokes Ky into battling him seriously when the former goads Dizzy as a monster. When Ky wins, he finds out Sol planned this for a preparation to settle with “That Man”, Asuka R. Kreutz the Gear Maker, who recently turned himself in to the government after the last battle against Ariels.

Ky returns as a playable character in Guilty Gear Strive (2021), where he will eventually begin to use his implemented Gear Cell's power, which allows him to be able to use Dragon Install similar to Sol, but can only be usable at low health unlike his rival. Ky was originally planned to volunteer a G4 summit with his family, but eventually halted due to I-No's invasion on Ariels’ prison and thereby saving his family from being held hostages during Happy Chaos’ invasion on U.S. White House, whereas the third Illirya king Daryl took care of Ky's place as the kingdom's main representative in the summit. Whether the summit needs Sol Badguy for urgent help, the letters are often goes to Ky, due to Sol's returning to his usual bounty hunting career. He and a fully recovered Jack-O interrogates I-No, when she suddenly surrendered herself on purpose after releasing Happy Chaos from Ariels' body. Ky and Jack-O suspect there might be more than just one traps during Chaos' invasion in U.S. white house, or rather, the airship Tir Na Nog. Ky and Jack-O arrive on time, after Sol, Asuka and U.S. president Vernon got rid of Happy Chaos at a same time witnessing Asuka reverting Sol back to his former human-self Frederick Bulsara through removing the Flame of Corruption in him. Unfortunately, Sol's de-transformation back to Frederick is on a bad timing when Chaos is still on the airship, taking a form of one of Giovanna's boss from security agency, and using the real Tome of Origin which fused with Asuka to fuse the Gear Maker's former master himself with I-No, restoring her full godlike power which Chaos split. With the help of Axl Low and Chaos' former servant Nagoriyuki, Ky uses Uno's Dragon Install to weakeaned I-No, allowing Sol to kill her with a god-killer weapon Outrage, thereby saving the universe from being destroyed and reset multiple times. In the epilogue, he and Dizzy are visited by Testament, introducing them to their new family. In the epilogue of Another Story A, set after the White House incident in the main story and midquel season-based anime Dual Rulers, Ky, and his son and wife, Sin and Dizzy are at the Illyrian Castle to celebrate the latter’s ceremonial welcome as an official Gear representative leader to the world, while his alternate future daughter Unika is now working as a bodyguard in training per United States' jurisdiction.

He is also a playable character in the spin-off games Guilty Gear Petit (2001), Isuka (2003), Dust Strikers (2006), and Judgment (2006). Along with Sol Badguy, he is the only character to appear in every Guilty Gear game.

=== Axl Low ===
Voiced by (English): Alexander Gross (Guilty Gear Strive)
Voiced by (Japanese): Keiichi Nanba

Axl Low (アクセル＝ロウ, Akuseru Rou) is a time traveller who comes from 20th-century England, over 150 years before the Guilty Gear storyline, before he was caught in a time slip that sent him into the future. Axl became a being similar to I-No with the ability to manipulate reality. He made attempts to return to his time and be reunited with his girlfriend, first participating in the Sacred Knights Tournament as he thought he could have his wish granted as the winner. He later tried to contact I-No upon realizing she can send him back to his time, only for Jack'O to reveal the truth of his powers and that he could erase their reality to return to his. After much deliberation, Axl finds the courage to use his powers to become someone Megumi could be proud of. In the end of the Strive storyline, Axl is reunited with Megumi after a dying I-No realized the connection between herself and Axl, making Axl realize that I-No was in fact Megumi's fallen alternate future-self, just as I-No discovered that Axl Low is an alternate timeline version of William (ウィリアム, Wiriamu).

=== Chipp Zanuff ===
Voiced by (English): Edward Bosco (Guilty Gear Xrd SIGN - present)
Voiced by (Japanese): Takuya Morito (Guilty Gear), Takeshi Miura (Guilty Gear X – XX), Yoshihisa Kawahara (Guilty Gear Xrd SIGN – present)

Chipp Zanuff (チップ＝ザナフ, Chippu Zanafu) was a youth who struggled to live life on the streets of America. Chipp was a drug trafficker that soon became a drug user. He found himself in a complicated situation that led to him fleeing from the Mafia. Chipp had become outnumbered and was almost dying, but his pursuers were dispatched by a man called Tsuyoshi (毅). He offered Chipp into his care, and trained Chipp in the art of Ninjutsu. They lived peacefully together until an assassin syndicate ordered Tsuyoshi's killing. Chipp, in an attempt to pursue the culprits responsible, entered the second sacred order tournament in order to get him a lead in his travels. Sometime during the events of XX onward, Chipp founded a kingdom called East Chipp Kingdom in a once lawless southern part of Africa. During Ariels' descent to madness, he is the first to discover that she is possessed by Happy Chaos, the true mastermind who manipulated the events and used Asuka as a scapegoat for the cause he did not commit.

=== Justice ===
Voiced by (Japanese): Takuya Moritou (Guilty Gear), Wakana Sakuraba (Guilty Gear XX), Kazue Fujita (Guilty Gear Xrd SIGN)

Justice (ジャスティス, Jasutisu) is the original Command Class Gear, created by Asuka from Aria as a means to end war. Through Happy Chaos's influence, the Universal Will took over Justice in an attempt to manifest into the physical world using her and the population of Japan. Asuka was forced to override Justice and force her to annihilate Japan to stop this. The ordeal shattered Aria's mind - she forgot her past and began the century-long conflict known as the Crusades, only regaining her memories as Aria when Sol killed her. However, Justice's body ended up in the possession of the Conclave, who sought to revive her so they could use her power to reform humanity according to their vision. Justice's body was taken by Ariels for her plan to merge with Elphelt Valentine, a genetic copy of Aria, to create a "complete humanity". Jack'O Valentine, possessing the fragmented half of Aria's soul, took Elphelt's place and merged with Justice to completely restore Aria.

=== Kliff Undersn ===
Voiced by: Hatsuaki Takami (Guilty Gear), Shigeru Sakano (Guilty Gear XX)

Kliff Undersn (クリフ＝アンダーソン, Kurifu Andāson) was a commander of the Holy Order and wields a massive sword known as the Dragonslayer (斬竜刀, Kiryūtō). A hero of the Crusades who clashed with Justice multiple times, he became a great mentor to Ky Kiske and personally scouted Sol Badguy to join the Holy Order, who had saved a younger Kliff from a rampaging Gear long ago. He is the foster-father of Testament, whom he found as an orphan during the Crusades. After decades serving as commander, he resigned from his position and entrusted it to Ky. For the rest of the Crusades, Kliff remained as an instructor, training new recruits. With the Crusade's end and the disbanding of the Order after Justice's defeat, Kliff finally retired. Only a couple years later, he would join the Second Holy Order Selection Tournament, and would lose his life to his own child.

=== May ===
Voiced by (English): Eden Riegel (Guilty Gear Xrd SIGN - present)
Voiced by (Japanese): Satomi Kōrogi

May (メイ, Mei) is the young, cute, and spunky first mate of the Jellyfish air pirates who is utterly dedicated to Johnny, the leader of the pirates who raised her after she was orphaned. She entered the first tournament in order to bail Johnny out of prison, and fights in later tournaments for his benefit. She fights with a massive ship's anchor, which she is able to swing with ease. May is revealed to be one of the endangered citizens of Japan who are cursed by the Universal Will with a seed that would transform them into living bombs bent on destroying the world. In Xrd, she begins to suffer an illness and is brought to Kum Haehyun for treatment. Thanks to the treatment, May has Information Flares in her which saves her from becoming an antimatter Gear.

=== Millia Rage ===
Voiced by (English): Tara Platt (Guilty Gear Xrd SIGN - present)
Voiced by (Japanese): Yuko Sumitomo

Millia's last name, Rage, is named after German heavy-metal band Rage. Daisuke Ishiwatari created Millia's character to, through her relationship with Zato, convey the feelings of a person who loves someone who is rejected from society. When designing her, Ishiwatari wanted her to be a "really cool woman". As an assassin her initial design drafts had knives strapped all over her body, and her gameplay was intended to focus on projectiles. However, in practice he felt Millia's weapon usage made her too similar to another character in the game, Baiken, and additionally that the game needed more character variety. Additionally Millia's outfit went through multiple designs as Ishiwatari had difficulty figuring out where the thrown knives would be stored, while also aiming for a design that looked feminine and easy to move in. After some consideration, he conceived her being able to attack with her hair as a weapon instead. He felt it represented a very "strange" and "feminine" trait, while was something easier to represent in 2D sprite art without looking unnatural. Several more drafts followed, before he settled on an outfit that resembled a woman just wearing a t-shirt, feeling it reflected a very feminine look for her.

After the death of her parents, she is adopted into a nearby assassin syndicate, the Assassin's Guild. There, she learns the Sixth Hi-Deigokutsuipou (or the "Six Forbidden Magics"), "Angra", which allows Millia's hair to model as she wants. Due to Zato-1's rise in power within the Guild, Millia seals him within a dimensional portal, and abandons the guild shortly thereafter, finding no comfort in the cruel ways of an assassin. In Guilty Gear (1998), Millia uses the Second Holy Order's Fighting Tournament as a method of tracking down Zato, who has escaped from the dimensional prison, to kill him. However, she can not do it as she is manipulated like the rest of the cast, and the bloodshed from the tournament releases Justice from her slumber. She is still in search of Zato in Guilty Gear X (2000). Panicked about a Gear with free-will, countries establish another tournament, awarding a prize to whoever captures the Gear. Millia uses this as another chance to find Zato. Canonically, she finds him, seemingly killing him. Unknown to her, a symbiotic creature named Eddie takes control of Zato's body.

In Guilty Gear X2 (2002), she receives sightings of a being similar to that of Zato's Forbidden Beast, Eddie. In XX, Millia has three different endings. In the first, faces Slayer just before she is about to confront Eddie. After a fight Millia manages to hold her ground but is unable to defeat him, Slayer tells Millia that her hair is of the same origins as Eddie, though Millia says she already knows it. In the second ending, she defeats Slayer and subsequently kills Eddie. The third ending shows that, after killing Eddie, she buries Zato's body. In Guilty Gear XX Accent Core Plus (2008), Millia sets off to find and kill Eddie and destroy the Assassin's Guild. In her first ending, she finishes her vendetta, as she slays Eddie. She continues to live on a run from the Assassin's Guild but did not falter in her mind and continues to keep her hair under control. In the second ending, however, she loses control of her hair and accidentally kills Bridget. As she stands horrified on her act, she is accidentally stabbed in the back by her fan, but she felt content as she died as herself, not as a monster.

By Guilty Gear Xrd (2014), Millia had made peace with Venom and worked together with him to find the resurrected Zato-1. Working with a reformed Assassin Guilt led by Zato-1, Millia became a new director of a reformed Post-War Administration Bureau in Guilty Gear Strive (2021). Both Millia and Zato are summoned by the third king of Illirya Kingdom, Daryl to investigate I-No's next plan, after she took something from an imprisoned Ariels, later revealed to be a demon-like sorcerer Happy Chaos. With the help of Anji and Chipp, during Chaos' terrorist attack on the U.S. white house, or rather an airship Tir Na Nog, Millia and the rest of the world learned the true identity of I-No's accomplish, his past relation to Asuka and the previous events. After I-No's demise at the hands of Sol Badguy (now a human named Fredrick Bulsara), Millia and Zato are last seen being regular customers of Venom and Robo-Ky's Bakery.

Millia is also a playable character in the spin-off games Guilty Gear Petit (2001), Isuka (2003), Dust Strikers (2006), and Judgment (2006).

=== Potemkin ===
Voiced by (English): Armen Taylor (Guilty Gear Strive)
Voiced by (Japanese): Hideyuki Anbe (Guilty Gear), Takashi Kondō (Guilty Gear X – present)

Potemkin (ポチョムキン, Pochomukin) is a massive slave-soldier of Zepp, a floating continent controlled by a military dictatorship. Potemkin was forced into the first tournament by his superiors. However, during the tournament, the government of Zepp was overthrown in a revolt led by his mentor Gabriel. Once Gabriel was made president of Zepp, Potemkin pledged his loyalty to the new government as a special agent. The mantle he wears was a slave collar used by his superiors to keep him in check, which he decided to keep as a memento of his past. From Xrd and onwards, he wears a Zepp Military Uniform and a masked helmet.

=== Testament ===
Voiced by (English): Kayleigh McKee (Guilty Gear -STRIVE-)
Voiced by (Japanese): Takami Akkun (Guilty Gear), Katsuaki Kobayashi (Guilty Gear X – XX), Yu Kobayashi (Guilty Gear -STRIVE-)

Testament (テスタメント, Tesutamento) was an orphan during the Crusades and was adopted by Kliff Undersn. When they were old enough, despite their foster father's wishes, they desired to inherit their father's name by joining the Holy Order. However, while carrying out one mission on behalf of the Order, Testament met an untimely end and their body was never found, assumed to be dead. They were in fact captured by government agents and converted into a Gear by the Post-War Administration Bureau for the purposes of experimenting and developing new weapons. Unlike most Gears, they still retained their sense of self. However, Justice turned them against humanity, and they found themself on the opposite side of the war from which they started, causing them to become cynical and filled with regret after being freed from Justice's mind control at the time of her death at the hands of Sol Badguy. While hiding from humanity, they acted as a guardian to Justice's daughter, Dizzy, when her Gear powers went awry and caused her to end up having a bounty on her head. That is until The Jellyfish Pirates adopted her, before she met and married Ky Kiske. Testament was not seen after Dizzy began her relationship with Ky until their return in the ending of Strive many years later, being introduced to Dizzy and Ky's son, Sin, including Elphelt and Ramlethal Valentine. When announced as the last Season 1 fighter of Strive, it was revealed that Testament now lives peacefully with Dizzy's adoptive human parents.

=== Zato-1 and Eddie ===
Voiced by (English): Matthew Mercer (Guilty Gear Xrd SIGN - present)
Voiced by (Japanese): Kaneto Shiozawa (Guilty Gear – X), Takehito Koyasu (Guilty Gear XX – present)

Zato-1 (ザトー＝ONE, Zato Wan) was a Spanish member of the powerful Assassins Guild that allowed himself to become the host of a symbiotic creature named Eddie (エディ, Edi) (Eddie's Name is seen as a reference to Eddie Brock, who shares a symbiotic relationship like Zato-1) in exchange for his sight. Because of this, Zato-1 was able to take control of his shadow, and use it as a weapon to gain great power. With this power, he made himself leader of the Assassins Guild. However, as his body weakened, Eddie was able to take control until Zato-1's death at the hands of Millia Rage. While his body was taken by Eddie from Guilty Gear XX onward, after the death of his voice actor Kaneto Shiozawa, Zato-1 was resurrected by the Conclave as part of their experiment and serving them until he is defeated by Faust. He later returns to the Assassins Guild and played a role in its reformation into a legit intelligence organization.

== Introduced in Guilty Gear X ==
=== Anji Mito ===
Voiced by (English): Aleks Le (Guilty Gear -STRIVE-)
Voiced by (Japanese): Toru Igarashi (Guilty Gear X – XX), Nobutoshi Canna (Guilty Gear -STRIVE-)

Anji Mito (御津 闇慈, Mito Anji), real name unknown, is among the few people born of Japanese descent. Because of this, he is protected by the government since full-blooded Japanese are an endangered race. While there are those who accept this lifestyle, Anji does not—he compares acceptance of government to living in a zoo's cage. To regain his freedom, he escaped from his colony and pursued "That Man" for answers. He fights with a pair of hand-held fans called Zessen (絶扇). It is implied that Anji stole the Zessen Wind Fans, which had been stored in the Japanese colony, before escaping. However, after Asuka turned himself in to the government and joined the world peace project in Strive, he is not "That Man" whom Anji refers to, it was the Gear Maker's former master, Happy Chaos, the true mastermind who had been possessing Ariels' body, and the one who both destroyed Baiken's village and used Asuka as a scapegoat for the cause.

=== Jam Kuradoberi ===
Voiced by (English): Xanthe Huynh (River City Girls 2)
Voiced by (Japanese): Manami Komori (Guilty Gear X – XX), Rei Matsuzaki (Guilty Gear Xrd REVELATOR)

Jam Kuradoberi (蔵土縁 紗夢, Kuradoberi Jamu) is a master chef, and longs to create her own restaurant, but lacks the means to do so. She seems to have terrible luck in this endeavor even once she gets it off the ground. She's a fairly docile character, and also relatively unimportant during the beginning arcs of the storyline. However, during XX, Jam's ability to wield Ki becomes a very notable aspect. She can be described as a bit of a flirt, as she has hit on both Bridget and Ky in her story. Jam returns in Guilty Gear Xrd -Revelator-/Rev 2, where her restaurant was somehow destroyed for the third time, and became frustrated when she found out that Ky married to Dizzy, leading her to return to bounty hunting. After Rev 2, as shown in the ending of -Strive-, Jam is opens a fourth restaurant, where she is seen serving dishes for Kum Haeyun, and later revealed to have a pet rabbit.

=== Johnny ===
Voiced by (Japanese): Norio Wakamoto
Voiced by (English): Liam O'Brien

Johnny (ジョニー, Jonī) is the captain of the airship May Ship and leader of the Jellyfish Pirates. His first appearance was in Guilty Gear as a non-playable character in May's ending, and he became a playable character in Guilty Gear X. Johnny is a compulsive womanizer; his entire crew, including May, is composed of young women, but when it comes to the protection of his crew, Johnny is a selfless acting man who will protect the lives of his crewmates as well as others if need be. He is protective of Dizzy, defending her from bounty hunters in Guilty Gear X and I-No's attack in Guilty Gear XX. He fights with a wood-handled Japanese sword and uses the Iaidō style of swordsmanship. Johnny made an NPC appearance again in Guilty Gear Xrd -Sign- before returning as playable in Guilty Gear Xrd -Revelator- and Guilty Gear Strive.

=== Venom ===
Voiced by (Japanese): Mikio Yaeda (Guilty Gear X), Junichi Suwabe (Guilty Gear XX – present)
Voiced by (English): Howard Wang (Guilty Gear Strive)

Venom (ヴェノム, Venomu) is an orphan raised by the Assassin's Guild. Venom became an apprentice and the devoted right hand of Zato when he saved him from being executed by the Guild who were displeased by Venom's reluctance to kill. Once Millia began to hunt Zato and the parasite Eddie began taking more control, Venom began his quest to save his beloved master. He fights using a cue stick.

In -Revelator-/Rev 2 storyline, he met and befriended Robo-Ky. After the storyline, he and a now bodyless Robo Ky are trying to readjust their new normal lives to repair the latter's body. Venom started out as a street vendor in a street alleyway before eventually being offered to open a bakery at a main shopping district. He has also done this to hide his identity and clear his assassination record. After the base story of Strive, Venom comes out of his retirement from fighting, to serve as a guardian phantom vigilante by night at his current hometown, with Robo-Ky, now under his new body serves as Venom's assist sidekick. Although another Robo-Ky who came to exist because the original Robo-Ky accidentally inhaling a gas of cloning flower Faust brought serves as a standlone playable.

== Introduced in Guilty Gear Petit ==
=== Fanny ===
Fanny (ファニー, Fanī) is a strange nurse with a connection to Dr. Baldhead who saves her life from a sickness. She fights her enemies in a similar same style to Dr. Baldhead, using a syringe that once belonged to her late mother. She appeared in the WonderSwan exclusive game Guilty Gear Petit and its sequel, Guilty Gear Petit 2. Her endings in both games show a connection with Dr. Baldhead. In the first she is wondering why Dr. Baldhead disappeared; in the second she is saying goodbye because she knows she will never see him again.

== Introduced in Guilty Gear X2 and updates ==
=== Robo-Ky ===
Voiced by (Japanese): Takeshi Kusao (Guilty Gear X – XX), Yutaka Terada (Guilty Gear XX #Reload – XX Slash), Takumi Inoue (Guilty Gear XX Accent Core), Shigeru Chiba (Guilty Gear Xrd REVELATOR/Rev 2 - Guilty Gear Strive (Season 5))
Voiced by (English): Alejandro Saab (Guilty Gear Strive)

Robo-Ky (ロボカイ, Robokai) is not simply one character, but in fact a line of robotic copies of Ky Kiske created by the shadowy Post War Administration Bureau. For some reason, Robo-Ky is often mistaken for the real Ky Kiske and vice versa during the game's story mode, even though his face is obviously metallic, his voice is higher-pitched and robotic, and he constantly blurts out *GIGIGI* or *BZZZT* noises during story sequences. As of Xrd, there's only one Robo-Ky left who survived its last appearance in XX Accent Core, the sentient first model unit, now as a con for hire and presumably homeless, until Venom hired the robot for some urgent emergencies. Sometimes later in After Story of Xrd Rev 2, Robo-Ky, now reduced to a head after sacrificing his body from his last battle against Bedman, is currently accompanying Venom, who wants to repay the robot's life to get more money and build a new body for him. Starting out as street vendors, they eventually open a bakery shop. After the base story of Strive, Venom has enough money to build a new body for Robo-Ky, and eventually comes out of retirement from fighting, with Robo-Ky serving as Venom's sidekick during his activity as a phantom guardian vigilante of their current hometown by night. Ultimately following the event of Dual Rulers, the result of the gas from a cloning flower Faust brought multiplies Robo-Ky whenever he sneezed, yet resulting one of them serves as a standalone playable once they build a new body and a new dual weapon, while the other still serve as Venom's sidekick and taking care of his bakery at night.

=== Slayer ===
Voiced by (Japanese): Iemasa Kayumi (Guilty Gear XX – Xrd SIGN), Takaya Hashi (Guilty Gear Xrd REVELATOR – Strive (Season 4))
Voiced by (English): JB Blanc (Guilty Gear Xrd -Sign-, Guilty Gear Strive)

Slayer (スレイヤー, Sureiyā) is one of the few surviving members of a nearly extinct ancient vampire race, the Nightless (ナイトレッスン, Naitoressu), who founded the Assassins Guild. He comes out of hiding when the Guild dives into chaos after Zato's disappearance. Cultured and debonair, Slayer adheres to a code of Dandyism. He enjoys haiku and spends his time with his wife Sharon, another immortal. He also has a personal connection with Gabriel, the president of Zepp, but seems to be acquainted with all of the movers and shakers of the Guilty Gear universe. He has the apparent motive of either observing the cast, or warning them of being targeted by the Post-War Administration Bureau. He personally knows "That Man"/Asuka and that character seems to hold him in high regard since he apologizes to Slayer. He was originally thought to be the only known surviving Nightless left, until another known as Nagoriyuki is found alive and unearthed by Happy Chaos during -STRIVE-.

=== Zappa ===
Voiced by: Yūji Ueda

Zappa (ザッパ, Zappa) is an unlucky young man, looking for a wife and writing in his diary about his new "disease" he has, which, from his point of view, consists of fainting and then waking up somewhere else, possibly with alarming wounds and fractures and no memory of how he got there. He seeks the doctor Faust to cure his paranormal ailment. When entering a battle, he is unconscious, with S-Ko (S子)—his most powerful vengeful spirit—and the other ghosts having control of his actions. These ghosts consist of three giant centipedes, several will-o-wisp-like apparitions that manipulate a broken sword, three gray ghosts, a dark chihuahua-like dog, and a manifestation of lightning called Raou. As of Xrd, he is now "cured" from S-Ko's possession and now working for a paranormal investigation team at Illyria, under direction of the third king Daryl. By the time he reunites with Faust, Zappa soon stumbled upon what Faust had been reading, realizing the true masterminds behind manipulating the Conclave to attack humanity wants something to do on annihilating the Japanese for their extra ordinary Ki.

== Introduced in Guilty Gear Isuka ==
=== A.B.A ===
Voiced by (Japanese): Maki Takimoto (GGIsuka-GGAC+R), Riho Sugiyama (GGST)
Voiced by (English): Anna Brisbin (GGST)

A.B.A (アバ, Aba) is an artificial life-form, or homunculus, that was created by a scientist who lived within Frasco (フラスコ, Furasuko) mountain. However, before her birth, her creator was taken away by the military. A.B.A found herself alone within Frasco, and lived the first ten years of her life in total isolation until she managed to escape from Frasco. She began to collect keys to find relief from her sadness as they represented the opening of a bold new world and an escape from imprisonment. Eventually, she finds Flament Nagel, an ancient war relic shaped like a key, and decides to keep it as her partner; whom she renamed Paracelsus (パラケルス, Parakerusu). Her new goal was to acquire an artificial body for her newfound partner, whom she refers to as her spouse. She later dyes her hair color in Strive.

=== Robo-Ky Mk. II ===
Voiced by: Takumi Inoue

Robo-Ky Mk. II (ロボカイⅡ, Robo Kai Tsū) is an upgraded model of the original Robo-Ky. Unlike his predecessor, he is able to imitate characters other than Ky Kiske. All of his parameters (like attack strength, defense, etc.) and moves are fully customizable in the RKII Factory Mode the game offers. Also unlike the original model, Mk. II is built by and has loyalty to a mysterious scientist, not the Post-War Administration Bureau.

=== Leopaldon ===
Leopaldon (レオパルドン, Reoparudon) is the boss of Guilty Gear Isuka. He is a good man at heart who somehow manages to control a giant Gear, his faithful dog. A killer who shows absolutely no mercy, he is also a formidable beast.

== Introduced in Guilty Gear Judgment ==
=== Judgment ===
Judgment was originally Raymond, a mad scientist working on the remote island of Isene and exploiting its inhabitants, trying to create a living weapon that would surpass even the Gears. He believed his work was the work of God. Raymond is devoured by Inus, a dark king of the underworld, who is subsequently killed. This allows Raymond to take control of Inus's power, transforming himself into Judgment. However, because Inus wished to remain dead, Judgment was subsequently consumed after being defeated.

== Introduced in Guilty Gear 2: Overture ==
=== Dr. Paradigm ===
Voiced by (Japanese): Yuji Mikimoto

Dr. Paradigm (Dr.パラダイム, Dokutā Paradaimu) is yet another of Guilty Gear 2: Overture's seven playable characters. He is one of the sealed Gears from the dimensional plane Backyard (バックヤード, Bakkuyādo) during the era of the Genocide Gear Justice in the Crusades. This action was done so Justice could not control his mind using her Commander Gear abilities. Paradigm was later released when the 100-year war was over. Dr. Paradigm is a strongly skilled magician with a fairly large book of magics. He has a protective bubble around him which appears to be permanent. Due to Justice's daughter, Dizzy married to a noble first king of Illriya, Ky Kiske and has a son named Sin, Dr. Paradigm begin to work for the kingdom.

=== Izuna ===
Voiced by (Japanese): Toru Furusawa

Izuna (イズナ) is another playable character who made his debut in Guilty Gear 2: Overture. Along with Valentine, Izuna also comes from the Backyard. Izuna is a Japanese fox spirit from a mysterious race called the Yokai. Unlike most spirits of his kind, Izuna gained a physical form through the power of his will. Izuna states that "There are more physical spirit demons like me, but were brainwashed by Valentine". He is a very skilled swordsman who wields a katana named "Namakura". Not only that, he possesses certain unique magical abilities such as his potent teleportation. Izuna is also the one to teach Sol Badguy and Sin how to use the tactics of the Ghost and Master Ghost system in the game as well. Most fans believed Izuna's looks were taken off of Slayer. Though this is not likely because various interviews with Daisuke Ishiwatari has him exclaiming that Izuna along with Valentine, Dr. Paradigm, and Sin are all new children (creations) of his.

Ever since the Cradle Incident in Xrd, his current whereabouts are not known, and no one has been able to reach him since.

=== Raven ===
Voiced by (Japanese): Shigeru Sakano (Guilty Gear XX), Hiroki Yasumoto (later games)

One of three servants to That Man. Born during the reign of the Holy Roman Empire in the Kingdom of Germany, Raven was an accomplished soldier with many victories in the war against a foreign country. However, after only a year, the campaign became unsustainable, and forced units like his to raid enemy farming villages for supplies. In one raid, his unit gets ambushed by enemy soldiers. Raven tried to flee, but was struck down by a hail of arrows and stabbed to death by these soldiers. But instead of dying, he woke up in a pool of his own blood with his wounds healed. That is when he realized he had the power of immortality. However, with time, Raven grew apathetic and tired of living. Attempting suicide many times, he even tried driving an experimental device through his skull to cut his brain stem but still failed. He would eventually meet with That Man and served under him.

In the Guilty Gear novel "Lightning the Argent", Raven shows unusual battle prowess by essentially ignoring Sol's fire attacks, via regeneration, and beating Faust in an inter-dimensional battle. He is also present in several endings in Guilty Gear XX. Raven appears as a boss character as well as was made a playable character via DLC in the game Guilty Gear 2: Overture for the Xbox 360. In Xrd second story of -Revelator, he is entrusted by That Man to carry on his mission in his absence, due to Bedman's interference while trying to stop Justice from destroying Earth, sending him into Nightmare Theater, though immune to the effect, but had him locked within isolated space, thus unable to exit real world, which That Man found it difficult to try. Raven was tasked to find Elphelt before she merges with Justice, and to seek out Jack-O, but first they need an assistance of Sol and his party since their objectives coincide. After finding Jack-O, he teleports himself and Jack-O away to await That Man's return. Later on he would save Ramlethal from a Gear's explosion.

After the successful defeat of Ariels' plans, he meets up with That Man to bid their farewells. Although That Man tries to part ways with him as just friends, Raven tells a story about his attempt to play God and to help people. Long ago, he settled into a village and used his powers to heal others and to overthrow tyrants. He was celebrated for his miracles. And word spread of his exploits to other settlements who sought his aid. So he left the village to help these other settlements. However, upon returning to the original village, he was blamed for problems that occurred during his absence. This is when he realized he was no savior, but only a repairman to these people. He believes that by being a "storyteller", he might be able to truly save people. Thus, he takes up this role for That Man, as a friend, and part ways with him.

Raven has been announced as a playable character for Revelator in February 2016.

=== Sin Kiske ===
Voiced by (English): Yuri Lowenthal (Guilty Gear 2: Overture), Lucien Dodge (Guilty Gear Xrd SIGN - present)
Voiced by (Japanese): Issei Miyazaki

Sin Kiske (シン＝キスク, Shin Kisuku) is another of the six unique playable characters in Guilty Gear 2: Overture. He is son of the king of Illyuria, Ky Kiske, and the Maiden of the Grove, who was confirmed to be Dizzy. He was left in Sol Badguy's care because of the exploitable fact of his Gear cells may be known to the public. He bears grudges towards his father for neglecting him because of his duties as a king. Though Sin is at most five years old, he has the appearance of a tall boy in his late teens—making it hard to notice his rash, childlike behavior. Through Sol's training, Sin has grown into a very strong child. Sin is playable in the console versions of Guilty Gear Xrd, where he reconciles with his father, after his mother was freed from her seal, and eventually realizes that Sol is related to him and his family, out of concern of his relation with Justice, Sin's grandmother whose identity was once Aria. With his mother's reputation being cleared for her heroic actions against a possessed Ariels, Sin returns home with his family to live peacefully, in addition of welcoming Elphelt and Ramlethal Valentines to the family. With Dizzy's previous outcast record being cleared, and being praised as a heroine and publicly as the first non-human leader, a queen, Sin becomes a knight, just like his father before him. Sin also serves as a protagonist of Dual Rulers, an anime midquel between third and fourth seasons of Strive ahead of his parents' official marriage, at the same time Sol ultimately comes in term with his past and confirm his kinship to his daughter, Dizzy, thanks to Vernon, as well as learning Unika as his alternate future younger sister.

=== Valentine ===
Voiced by (Japanese): Chie Sawaguchi

Valentine (バレンタイン, Barentain) is one of six playable characters in Guilty Gear 2: Overture. Valentine is the exact copy of Aria, who is indeed one form of the genocide Gear Justice. Valentine's motives lead her to be defeated by Sol Badguy who was once in love with Aria. Her weapon of choice is a talking balloon named Lucifero (ルシフェロ, Rushifero) with various amplified magic abilities. Valentine also has the power to brainwash enemies and turn them into her allies. Valentine's true form is a fake version of a Gear as yet her human looks resemble an unfinished Aria. Although she was destroyed, according to Raven and Asuka, there can be multiple Valentines, which eventually confirms only three known Valentines who first debut in Xrd.

== Introduced in Guilty Gear Xrd and updates ==
=== Answer ===
Voiced by (Japanese): Tomokazu Seki

Answer (アンサー, Ansā) is a chief officer of Chipp Zanuff. Originally, he was an average street punk before Chipp appeared in his home to clean up crime and help the downtrodden. Finding his preaching annoying, Answer had challenged Chipp to a duel, but lost. After this loss, he was swayed by Chipp's words and joined him in creating the East Chipp Kingdom. Answer is said to have a photographic memory, and he essentially assists Chipp as a 'human database'.

=== Bedman ===
Voiced by (English): Yuri Lowenthal
Voiced by (Japanese): Hikaru Midorikawa

Bedman (ベッドマン, Beddoman), real name Romeo F. Neumann (ロミオ・F・ノイマン, Romeo F Noiman), is a character who made his debut in Guilty Gear Xrd. He is smart, fast-talking and known to ramble, despite saying he does not like long conversations. He is a mind-reading assassin who in an induced coma like his sister Delilah due to their unique condition of their bodies unable to handle their greatly enhanced thought processes, creating a dream world to interact with others while using a weaponized roll-away bed to physically move about. Bedman is hired by Ariels to aid in her scheme with the promise that he would be able to retrieve his sister from her dream and they would thrive in the Absolute World, unaware that of what it actually is. After being forced to be awakened by Venom and Robo-Ky, the latter immune to his mind reading, Bedman succumbs to his condition and dies as he was about to kill Ariels upon learning she exploited him. Shortly after his death, an unknown person who appears to resemble Bedman, later revealed his recently awakened twin sister Delilah approaches his crumbling petrified corpse. As it turns out in Strive that Bedman's soul is still alive within his weaponized bed frame, and Delilah discovers that Happy Chaos is responsible for Ariels' corruption and her brother's eventual downfall prior to being separated by I-No. Thanks to being convinced by Sin to focus on Delilah's survival when her power is proved to be dangerous that would unintentionally destroy her surrounding in attempt to kill Chaos, Bedman sacrifice his soul to buy sometime for Ramlethal and Baiken to give a cure developed by Faust to Delilah. Sometimes later, Bedman's weaponized bed frame has been repaired by Delilah herself, off-screen where it was announced as DLC playable character for Season 2.

=== Elphelt Valentine ===
Voiced by (English): Cassandra Morris
Voiced by (Japanese): Aya Suzaki

Elphelt Valentine (エルフェルト バレンタイン, Eruferuto Barentain) is a character introduced in the console version of Guilty Gear Xrd as DLC. She is first portrayed as an ally, before and after capturing her sister, Ramlethal, and during a strike against Conclave and Justice. However, in the final chapters of Story Mode, once she exceeded her fighting limit too much, as Dr. Paradigm's warned her not to engage in combat while defending the Illriya castle, it is revealed her "true" objective was originally concealed from her own mind and didn't activate until after Justice's awakening. She was purposefully created not knowing her objective so that she could get close to Sol, Ky, and other major threats to "Mother." Even though Sol had much distrust for her in the beginning, he felt the need to save her from her programming as she started to remind him of Aria, not only in appearance, but personality as well. Before she self-destruct with no other way to stop it, she is stopped and saved by her sister Ramlethal as thanks for helping her awaken to the concept of emotions. She is then brought back to the Backyard where her fate is currently unknown. Apparently, she survived in -Revelator- storyline, but suddenly undergone a drastic change on her emotion and costume appearances. She is used by the mastermind, Ariels (or rather possessed by Happy Chaos) to be a vessel of Justice and destroyed humanity, but only to be saved Jack-O' by switching their places, and thus reviving Aria. Afterwards, she and Ramlethal lives in Kiske Estate. Thanks to Dizzy's recent heroic reputation and her marriage with Ky became known at the same time that led to Asuka's dream of co-existence world peace between human and Gears comes true, Elphelt has been forgiven by humanity and forms the band "Speothos Venaticus" as of -Strive-.

=== Jack-O' Valentine ===
Voiced by (English): Nicole Tompkins
Voiced by (Japanese): Hiromi Igarashi

Jack-O' Valentine (ジャックオー·バレンタイン, Jakkuō Barentain), more commonly known as simply Jack-O', is a playable character in Guilty Gear Xrd -Revelator- who uses Jack O'Lantern-themed weapons such as explosives . She is a Valentine that Asuka created from the remaining half of Aria's soul, created for the purpose to merge with Justice to restore her as Aria. Being incomplete made her slightly unstable and unable to function without her mask and toffee while developing a second childish persona. While Jack-O succeeds in her mission, she becomes the dominant persona of the completed Aria as she accompanies Sol as a bounty hunter. Despite already becoming a reincarnated Aria, Jack-O still has a conflict of being the original Aria's replacement, but her Aria-half insist she is better than she think she was, even Sol never once called Jack-O, "Aria", yet she already possess her pre-incarnate self's kindness completely from prior to becoming Justice as a primary reason for Sol to finally found peace and live.

=== Kum Haehyun ===
Voiced by: Hideaki Tezuka (Jeonryeok Kum)

Kum Haehyun (琴慧弦, Kumu Hehyon) is the head of the Kum family and descendant of "Tuners" who can control the flow of energy. Kum Haehyun is a female, unknown to all, and normally rides inside of the humanoid artificial body Jeonryeok Kum ("Full Power Kum"). Only the Kum family are able to manipulate the flow of energy, but their presence in the world is scarce.

=== Leo Whitefang ===
Voiced by (English): Jamieson Price
Voiced by (Japanese): Tetsu Inada

Leo Whitefang (レオ·ホワイトファング, Reo Howaitofangu) is a character who first appeared in the console version of Guilty Gear Xrd as DLC. One third of the triumvirate ruling Illyria. He's an old acquaintance of Ky's from the Crusades, during which they became friends and rivals. Once faced with the threat of annihilation on the frontlines, he proved his combat and leadership skills by leading his unit to survival. His raucous tone may give the impression that he lacks guile, but he's actually very discrete. He's proud and a sore loser, but he's also a hard worker, always willing to put in a little more effort. He created his very own dictionary, and privately enjoys adding people and incidents to the definitions of existing words. Leo is also an expert at surveillance. This is shown when he re-inspects which one is the real Happy Chaos, whom Sol, Asuka and Vernon thought to get rid of him off the White House airship Tir Na Nog.

=== Ramlethal Valentine ===
Voiced by (English): Erin Fitzgerald (Guilty Gear Xrd -SIGN-), Laura Stahl (Guilty Gear Strive)
Voiced by (Japanese): Megumi Han

Ramlethal Valentine (ラムレザル·バレンタイン, Ramurezaru Barentain) appears as a boss and later playable character in Guilty Gear Xrd. A lone girl who declared war on the entire world. She is a non-human life form born in the Backyard, which governs all of creation. Her relation to the Valentine who orchestrated the prior Baptisma 13 Incident (the Illyrian Invasion) is unknown. As an assassin of the Merciless Apocalypse, her objective is the extermination of the human race, and to that end she has formed an alliance of convenience with the United Nations Senate. Awakening the "Cradle" is her sole objective and mission. Her primary obstacle is Sol. However, her objective failed and she was easily captured because of Elphelt Valentine's sudden appearance. During her "imprisonment", she began to develop more emotions, instead of gloomy, sadistic and painless, under Sin and Elphelt's surveillance. When Bedman is sent by "Mother" to eliminate Ramlethal, he agrees to do so as he sees her as a thing, not a person. He is quite shocked, however, to see she has gained emotions and thus can't bring himself to kill a "little girl". When Elphelt went to help Leo to counter the Conclave and Justice's invasion on Illriya's castle, she exceeds her fighting limit. This turns her into a mindless puppet and she attacks her own allies after The Conclave and Justice are defeated. After Sol helps her re-assert her true consciousness, she decides to self-destruct to prevent herself from harming her allies, but Ramlethal deactivates her self-destruct sequence, in return for her kindness and introducing her to the concept of emotions. She is last seen in the company of Sol, Ky, and Sin as she watches her sister being summoned back into the Backyard. In -REVELATOR-, she is currently accompanying Sol and Sin as they search for Elphelt and Justice. After Jack-O switches places Elphelt and is reborn as Aria, she and Elphelt begin living at the Kiske Estate at the same time when Dizzy's public reputation is cleared and herself being praised as a perfect queen who married to a kind king like Ky. As of STRIVE, Ramlethal becomes a brigade commander at Illyria.

== Introduced in Guilty Gear Strive ==
=== Asuka R. Kreutz and Asuka R♯ ===
Voiced by (English): Yuri Lowenthal (Guilty Gear 2: Overture), Derek Stephen Prince (Guilty Gear XRD -SIGN- - present)
Voiced by (Japanese): Tomokazu Sugita

Asuka R. Kreutz (飛鳥＝Ｒ＝クロイツ, Asuka R. Kuroitsu), the Gear Maker, is the creator of the Gears, and both initially thought to be referred to as "That Man" (あの男, Ano Otoko) and the primary antagonist of the Guilty Gear games until Xrd revealed his past and how he was turned into a scapegoat. Asuka was an apprentice of The Original (now Happy Chaos) who was entrusted with the Tome of Origin, which he fused into his body, along with the Flame of Corruption and the Scales of Juno. He bestowed the two powers to Fredrick and Aria when saving the latter and honoring her request for Fredrick to continue living. However, he comes to regret it when Aria's transition into Justice and easily getting corrupted by Universal Will caused the Gear Wars known as Crusades, with his reluctant initial firing on Japan to prevent the will from turning more Japanese into the living bombs Antimatter Gears unwittingly served as a beacon. But in the Xrd storyline, aiding the protagonists in stopping the Conclave and then a possessed Ariels, Asuka revealed he only took the blame for the Universal Will's actions while creating Jack'O to complete Justice's restoration to Aria. Once Ariels is defeated, and Jack-O fully reincarnated as a fully human Aria, Asuka surrenders to the government so he can commence his World Peace Experiment with the intent of removing the Flame of Corruption from Sol, and leaving Earth to prevent the Tome of Origin from falling into the wrong hands. Although Asuka succeeds in removing Flame of Corruption from Sol, after he, Sol and U.S. president Vernon thought they got rid of Happy Chaos, their timing is at the worst peak when Chaos has escaped the ambush by swapping places with a brainwashed agent and expose the real Tome of Origin from Asuka's body to fuse himself with I-No, until Sol destroys her, with a help from Nagoriyuki, Axl and Ky. Following days, Asuka started a new normal life as a radio broadcaster in his own established studio, his dream job, with Tir na Nog as the main station while moving the U.S.A.'s White House to safer areas.

He was originally non-playable in the previous games, until he was announced as the fourth playable DLC of Strive's 2nd season on May 17, 2023, with a release date of May 25, 2023. Although his decoy clone, dubbed Asuka R♯ (飛鳥＝Ｒ♯, Asuka R♯) serves as the character's default palette.

=== Delilah Neumann ===
Voiced by (English): Jessica DiCicco
Voiced by (Japanese): Akane Fujikawa

A younger sister of the late Bedman, Romeo, and unwitting antagonist in the Another Story of Guilty Gear Strive, who briefly appeared as a cameo character in Guilty Gear Xrd sub-series. Due to her unstable physical condition, Delilah has been put into the Backyard while her brother has been working hard to find cures for her. Following Bedman's sacrifice to weaken Happy Chaos-possessed Ariels before the heroes' final battle against the fallen Sanctus Populi, Delilah returns to the real world shortly and is consumed by vengeance. As Baiken learns that Chaos cannot be killed easily, she has no choice to adopted Delilah at Anji and Chipp's behalf, to keep her from endangering herself.

By the time Happy Chaos is freed by I-No and made their next moves during Strive event, Delilah decides to get her revenge on Chaos. However, her full power is too unstable to be used to destroy Chaos and turns her into a living bomb that would destroy everything around her. Thankfully, Bedman, whose soul resides in his weaponized bed manages to buy his time to keep Delilah's power in check for short period, until Faust manage to administer a proper cure for her. This costs the former's soul and the latter's physical condition, but allows Baiken and Ramlethal to save her, with the help from Sin and Jellyfish Pirates. She then repaired Bedman's weaponized bedtime to serve her as her companion during the second season of the game.

=== Giovanna ===
Voiced by (English): Lilimar Hernandez
Voiced by (Japanese): Mayumi Shintani

Giovanna (ジオヴァーナ) is a Brazilian officer in the special operations unit that protects the President of the United States, accompanied by a wolf spirit called Rei. She is a very talented agent, yet still declined the privilege of earning a high ranked badge, due to hating its current new design made by president Vernon due to it being too cartoony. When Happy Chaos' invasion on the White House is about to begin, Giovanna was able to get there in time and took out most of Chaos' brainwashed agents and soldiers off-screen before the White House is revealed to be an airship Tir Na Nog. Giovanna wants to "find a good man," particularly the Illyrian second king, Leo Whitefang. Her distaste towards the special operations unit's cheesy high ranked badge design and her interest in Leo allows the second King to realize that the real Chaos was impersonating one of the new agents, Udos, and was still on the airship. In Season 4, after the anime Dual Rulers, Giovanna serves as a supervisor of Unika Kiske during training as a bodyguard under the government's jurisdiction.

=== Goldlewis Dickinson ===
Voiced by (English): Steven Barr
Voiced by (Japanese): Masafumi Kimura

Goldlewis Dickinson (ゴールドルイス＝ディキンソン, Gōrudorūisu Dikinson) is the right hand-man of the 76th US President Colin Vernon E. Groubitz and the Secretary of Defense, who fights alongside an alien spirit filled coffin, code name "Area 51 - U.M.A.". Dickinson is personally invested in the ordeal with Asuka R. Kreutz, trying to protect his country from a possible threat of destruction. After Asuka turned himself in to the government and volunteered the World Peace G4 Summit, Dickinson was originally skeptical about Asuka supposedly advocating for peace, and jokes about whether "That Man" is actually two separate people. Unfortunately, his joke turns out to be the truth and he was unknowingly right all along. Asuka was held responsible for the initial firing, because of the person who exacerbated the conflict during the Crusades and framed Asuka as a scapegoat was actually his fallen master, Happy Chaos, the former Original, whom the public had also pinned under the title of "That Man" due to not knowing whom to blame for it.

He was initially one of the major NPC characters in the Guilty Gear Strive's main storyline, prior to being released as the first downloadable playable character of Season 1. Dickinson also has a twin older brother who is a carefree sheriff in one of the American stages of Guilty Gear Xrd. Despite both sharing their love for eating fast foods (particularly Burgers), Goldlewis is dutiful, compared to his brother's carefree attitude.

=== Happy Chaos ===
Voiced by (English): Robbie Daymond
Voiced by (Japanese): Makoto Takahashi

Happy Chaos (ハッピーケイオス, Happī Keiosu) is an overreaching antagonist who took the name of secondary Jack'O Valentine that Asuka created as a contingency should Sol Badguy fail to defeat Ariels or I-No's power runs rampant, formally introduced in Guilty Gear Strive. His true identity is an Irish man known as The Original (第一の男, Daīchi no Otoko; First Man), a child prodigy from the last 20th century who discovered the Backyard and created the Universal Will; "The Father of All Magic." He gathered disciples in Asuka R. Kreutz and the Conclave as he instructed them and the Sanctus Populi to safeguard the world, entrusting the artifacts he took from the Backyard to Asuka before departing into it to create I-No as a replacement to the Ultimate Will. But he mutates from absorbing half of I-No's power to prevent her from unraveling reality, losing his sense of morality while sealed within the Universal Will. Through possessing the Universal Will, the Original orchestrated numerous disasters and tragedies through the Universal Will with Asuka as his scapegoat. He later gains physical form when after I-No extracted him from Ariels, convincing I-No to steal Asuka's Tome of Origin to restore her power. Though he fused into I-No to restore her full power, he later reconstitutes himself following her demise.

He was later announced a third playable DLC of Strive Season 1 at Red Bull Kumite on 14 November 2021, and was slated for November 30, 2021, release date.

=== Nagoriyuki ===
Voiced by (English): Evan Michael Lee
Voiced by (Japanese): Taiten Kusunoki

Nagoriyuki (名残雪) is a dark-skinned Nigerian Nightless vampire samurai and a war veteran of Crusades who debuted in Guilty Gear Strive. In battle, he wields an enormous katana paired with a large wakizashi and can drain opponents of their blood, like his fellow surviving Nightless, Slayer. In contrast to Slayer's dandyism, Nagoiryuki is devoted to bushido. The material from his katanas is powerful and dangerous, which would slow those who have healing factors, no matter what species, including godlike beings. It is also implied that he knew Chipp's master, Tsuyoshi; as Chipp recognized some of his attacks, such as Gamma Blade. Having been sealed and meditating beneath a building in Illriya, he was forced to serve Happy Chaos once again on invading the U.S. White House airship Tir Na Nog, until he met Sol Badguy, allowing himself to be freed of Happy Chaos' control and aid Sol in return.

=== Unika ===
Voiced by (English): Erin Yvette
Voiced by (Japanese): Yui Ishikawa

Unika (ユニカ, Yunika) is a mysterious girl from an alternate future. She has short black hair streaked with blue, and her red eyes are obscured by goggles that appear to have horn-like shapes protruding out of them. She wears a white turtleneck shirt of an unidentified kind with the words T.E.O.C on it and a de-saturated blue jacket adorned with belts. Alongside that, she wears dark gray shorts, matching thigh-high socks and boots of a slightly lighter shade of gray.

In reality, she is an alternate reality sister of Sin Kiske, and like her brother, is also a Commander-type Gear as their mother and grandmother, Dizzy and Aria/Justice. Her bloodline can also be foreshadowed by her weapon that is similar to a Junkyard Dog belonging to her grandfather, Sol Badguy, but contains a Thunderseal from her timeline's biological father, Ky. Thus making her full real name Unika Kiske (ユニカ＝キスケ, Yunika Kisuke). At time after she was born, she was secretly being kidnapped and turned into a pawn of Nerville Hammer. Having been raised into hating her own kind, unbeknownst she is actually one of them, she was sent by Nerville to cause mayhem in the present. Unbeknownst that he will dispose both of her and his own present-self when succeeded. It is until she witnessed Bridget, who she befriended with becomes critically injured by Nerville, she decides to seek atonement for her past actions. After helping Sin and his allies to defeat Nerville, she is currently under jurisdiction, with the U.S. president, Vernon assures Sol that her name will be fully cleared, someday. Under the jurisdiction, she begin her career as a trainee bodyguard, under Giovanna's supervision.

== Non-playable characters ==
=== Aria Hale ===
Voiced by (English): Nicole Tompkins (Guilty Gear Strive)
Voiced by (Japanese): Chie Sawaguchi

Aria Hale (アリア·ヘイル, Aria Heiru) is Sol's lover and acquittance of That Man/Asuka, first referred to during Guilty Gear 2: Overture. Aria was said to be born with have an incurable illness called TP infection. Initially, Aria refused to take Asuka's suggestion to go a cryosleep to keep the illness negated until the cure is found, but eventually agrees with his suggestion when Sol volunteered to be transformed into a prototype Gear. While Aria's body is preserved, there are four known Valentines created, such as the original Valentine, Ramlethal, Elphelt and Jack-O, with the latter contains half of her soul and memories. It is also hinted that she could be Justice as when she was killed off, her final words were wishing the three of them could talk one last time. However, this was false, as Justice is revealed to be one of Aria's clones created from the cryogenic remains of her DNA and only retains some of her memories after her conversion into a Gear. While Aria is recreated after Jack-O switches places with Elphelt to merge with Justice in -Revelator-, she remains dormant while letting Jack'O become the dominant persona.

=== Ariels ===
Voiced by (English): Valerie Arem
Voiced by (Japanese): Junko Minagawa

Sanctus Maximus Populi Ariels is the current leader of the Sanctus Populi and the vessel of the Universal Will, an entity created by The Original to ensure eternal happiness for humans without harming them. But the Original made a critical error in not defining humans, with his creation reaching its own conclusion that the humanity it to meant to serve has yet to come into being and thus considers current "human" race as "redundancies" that must be exterminated. With the Sanctus Populi by its creator, the Universal Will made attempts to gain physical form in the real world through first the creation of Justice and then by possessing those who are named Sanctus Maximus Populi. As Ariels, she created the Valentines and recruited Bedman for her scheme to create an "Absolute World" while merging Justice with Elphelt to create the first her ideal humans. But the plan is foiled and Ariels is incarcerated, the Universal Will's actions later revealed to be manipulated and possessed by The Original, Happy Chaos as I-No extracted him from Ariels's body. She request Sol to stop both I-No and Chaos before they warped the universe. After I-No's demise, Ariels is fully recover back to her real good-self.

=== Baldias ===
Baldias (バルディウス, Barudiusu) is a member of the Conclave and one of the disciples of The Original (aka Happy Chaos). His only prominent appearance is in the Guilty Gear Vastedge XT mobile pachinko game, in which he fought Sol Badguy and Sin Kiske in their quest to upgrade Sol's Junkyard Dog Mk.II, but was killed in battle. His ghost makes a cameo appearance in Xrd -Revelator-.

=== Colin Vernon E. Groubitz ===
Voiced by (English): Anthony Alabi (Guilty Gear Strive)
Voiced by (Japanese): Kiyoyuki Yanada (Guilty Gear Xrd - Guilty Gear -Strive [base story]), Junichi Endo (Guilty Gear Strive Dual Ruler onward)

The 76th and current President of the United States in the current Guilty Gear timeline as of Xrd, with his predecessor Erica Bartholomew as his vice-president. He used to love football before entering the political world, keeping his football and his family photo at the White House as mementos. Sometime in the past, Vernon lost his right arm and was given a mechanical one, which can be used as a weapon to defend himself from danger, such as being able to switch between combat mode or long-range. He plays an important role in the base and Dual Rulers stories of Strive, serving as an important adviser to Sol about being parents, especially during an important wedding of the latter's daughter, Dizzy.

=== Daryl ===
Voiced by (English): Kaiji Tang
Voiced by (Japanese): Toshiki Izawa

The Third King United Kingdoms of Illyria. Unlike Ky and Leo, Daryl favors pragmatism, or in his own words; 'thinking objectively'. He is the least popular of the three kings as a result, but the people cannot deny his ability to rule, earning him the nickname King of Groundworks. He is a leader of a paranormal team where Zappa is a member.

When I-No made her move for the next terrorist attack after Ariels was defeated, Daryl takes Ky's position to represent Illyria's participation in World Peace G4 Summit at Washington D.C. Daryl's participation at G4 directly saves Ky's Gear family, due to being originally meant to appear alongside Ky as the representatives of the Gear species shortly before I-No's next scheme happens. During Happy Chaos' invasion of the White House, Daryl remains calm with no fear. When U.S. president Vernon becomes more involved with Sol and Asuka, including Giovanna in stopping Chaos, Daryl was able to learn Chaos' origin and connection to I-No, and outsmart him to ensure the safety of himself and the other world's leader (safe for Vernon) and secretly implanted emergency magic communicator on Chaos' cold coffee to provide emergency backups. Daryl likes puddings and hot tea, and hates coffee and cold-temperature drinks.

At some point in the After Story of Xrd Rev 2, before the event of Strive, Daryl was both regrettably pushing one of his subordinates from overusing herself on finishing the biggest pudding in the world, and being one of the paranormal members (barring Zappa) for eating his subordinates' still incomplete, yet unexpectedly cursed giant dessert. At the time of Strive, Daryl and the rest of his subordinates who ate the incomplete pudding are freed from its penalty curse off-screen. By the end of Strive after Sol (now a human named Frederick) defeated Chaos-empowered I-No, Daryl's team celebrates a proper completion of the giant pudding they made together this time.

=== Erica Bartholomew ===
Voiced by (English): Sarah Anne Williams (Guilty Gear Strive)
Voiced by (Japanese): Masumi Tazawa

A former President of the United States turned vice-president in the current Guilty Gear timeline and from the novel, The Butterfly and Her Gale. An orphan, she is a child prodigy who became president at the age of 17. Chipp decided to become her bodyguard after the Assassin Syndicate tried to kill her. The reason for the attempt on her life is because the US had been under the influence and corruption of the Syndicate for many years. One of Erica's goals was to rid the US of its influence by forming an alliance with President Gabriel of Zepp since his nation was the most highly technological and powerful nation in the world. Despite attempts by the syndicate to frame each nation of an assassination attempt on their leaders, blackmailing the Senate, and kidnapping her guardian and caretaker of her orphanage, the alliance was finally made thanks to the help of Chipp. She is succeeded by Colin Vernon and demoted to vice-president as of Xrd.

=== Gabriel ===
Voiced by (English): Richard Epcar
Voiced by (Japanese): Takayuki Sugō

Gabriel is Potemkin's mentor and the current president of the Independent Airborne State of Zepp, who came to power leading the slave uprising in which he freed Potemkin. Though seldom seen in battle, when he does fight, his displayed feats indicate he's one of the most formidable characters in the series. He has a friendly rivalry with Slayer due to his aforementioned powers, being one of few people able to pose a challenge to Slayer. He is also a friend of the current U.S. president Vernon.

=== Inus ===
A dark king of the underworld, Inus is the fifth boss of Guilty Gear Judgment. Split into skeletal sections (two of them resembling skulls), he devours Raymond just before attacking the player character. After whatever character the player is controlling defeats Inus, he is subsequently killed, allowing Raymond to absorb his power to become Judgment. However, since Inus wished to remain dead, Judgment was consumed after he was defeated.

=== Jellyfish Air Pirates ===
Jellyfish Air Pirates (空賊のジェリーフィッシュ快賊団, Kūzoku no Jerīfisshu Kaizoku-dan) is Johnny's all-female air pirate crew, who travel with him on the May Ship. The members include eleven girls, one older woman, and a cat. There are several playable characters from the Jellyfish Pirates in the games; namely May, Dizzy and Johnny himself. Most of the members of the Jellyfish crew are orphaned girls adopted by Johnny, but there are exceptions; he took in Dizzy for her protection (and seclusion) from the larger world, and in one ending of Guilty Gear XX allows Bridget to live on the ship (although she is not officially a Jellyfish Pirate) when she has nowhere else to go.

The crew, whose names are derived from the English names of the twelve months of the year, includes, Janis, a black cat with a shaggy white forelock; Febby, a tall busty blonde who is the record-keeper; March, a pink-haired baby girl with a stuffed penguin; April, the ship's pilot; May, one of the crew's most capable fighters and the ship's namesake; June, the navigator; July, who is said to be the fourth strongest fighter on board, after Dizzy, Johnny, and May; Augus, a dark complexion fighter known to be fast; Sephy, a brown-haired and gentle-expressioned girl; Octy, the crew's lookout; Novel, the ship's mechanic who rides a large red mecha; Leap, an enormous white-haired woman who is the ship's cook; Dizzy, whom Johnny helped fake her death for her own protection.

=== Malcolm Myers ===
Malcolm Myers is a minor antagonist who first appeared in main story's first chapter of Guilty Gear -Strive-. He is a wanted hooded criminal with a gas mask whose spear can be extended and pierce through his enemy's body. After I-No unseals Happy Chaos from Ariels's body, Malcolm is captured by Sol Badguy and his partner Jack-O Valentine, who then take him into custody at Illyria.

=== Nerville Hammer ===
Voiced by (Japanese): Yasuhiro Mamiya

Nerville Hammer is a United States senator and staunch anti-Gear activist who serves as the antagonist of the Guilty Gear Strive: Dual Rulers anime series. During the Crusades, he worked as a scientist engineering an anti-Gear virus, but his research was rejected, and he became resentful as Ky began preaching coexistence with Gears. In an alternate future, his incomplete virus infected Dizzy and caused all Gears to go berserk, leading to a second Crusade. To change the past, he raised Dizzy's orphaned daughter Unika and used Axl's powers to send her back in time and collaborate with his present-day self to become the world's savior.

The present-day Nerville uses the virus to infect Sin, causing him to issue a command for all Gears to die. However, Unika is also infected and commands all Gears to live, the contradictory orders causing Gears to go haywire. The future Nerville appears and absorbs his present-day self, revealing his true goal was to destroy all humans and Gears, ruling over what remains of the world. Having modified himself with Unika's cells, he becomes a massive Gear-like being that fills the sky, capable of producing millions of clones. Sin, Unika, and their allies fight off his duplicates, finally killing him by injecting his own virus into his core.

=== Post-War Administration Bureau ===
The Post-War Administration Bureau (終戦管理局, Shūsen Kanrikyoku) (or P.W.A.B.) is a fictional secret society in the Guilty Gear fighting game series, making its first appearance in Guilty Gear XX. It is the organization that created Robo-Ky, and changed Testament into a Gear.

The organization was founded during the war between humans and Gears; as its name implies, it was intended to manage the affairs of the human race and support the reintegration of soldiers back into society once the Crusades was over. However, the war's end saw no need for them, and it was supposed to have been disbanded. Instead, they fell into the direct control of the Conclave and retreated to the shadows.

The group demonstrably has access to relatively advanced technology, as it created Robo-Ky. However, its members can also use magic; an unidentified member of the group used a crystal ball to observe Jam Kuradoberi in one of her endings.

The purpose of the organization has apparently shifted entirely to maintaining its own power and influence, as well as its own secrecy. Its members are willing to go to any lengths to do so, evidently lacking any ethics in how they go about this. Its interest in each character seems focused on whether they should be manipulated, killed, captured, or studied, as each characters' Story Mode begins with the P.W.A.B.'s profile for that character, accompanied with a "risk rating" that apparently denotes how dangerous they are to the organization. Robo-Ky was created both to impersonate Ky Kiske and as an equalizer should they decide that direct confrontation is necessary. However, despite most of them being destroyed, one of the Robo-Ky becomes a sentient being and survive the destruction.

After the Conclave was found to be the mastermind behind the Cradle Incident in Xrd, the group was due to be dismantled. However, Illyria's Third King Daryl restructered the Bureau into an intelligence agency that supports the Illyria government, incorporating the former Assassin's Guild and having Millia as its head.

=== Solaria ===
A character from the novel Lightning the Argent. Solaria is a full-blooded Gear created by the Blackard Company. She was used by the company to awaken and control the world's dormant Gears as their weapons. She was later rescued by Ky Kiske where she now lives freely under the protection of the International Police Force.

=== Tsuyoshi ===
Chipp's Sensei and the man who changed his life. Tsuyoshi was a ninja master who saved Chipp when he was about to be killed by the mafia. It was his tutelage that changed Chipp from a drug addict to the man he is now. He was killed by the Assassin Syndicate before the events of Guilty Gear. The novel The Butterfly and her Gale reveals he was killed because he was an undercover agent of the International Police Force who infiltrated the Syndicate until they found out about his true identity. Tsuyoshi also had mysterious relations with Nagoriyuki, due to the latter can also use Gamma Blade, a technique which Tsuyoshi taught to Chipp.

=== Volf ===
A member of the Assassin Syndicate from the novel The Butterfly and her Gale. He is the man responsible for the death of Tsuyoshi. In the novel he & the Syndicate tries to prevent President Erica from forming the US/Zepp alliance in any way and even he himself was responsible for kidnapping her guardian. Ironically, his plans were thwarted by Tsuyoshi student, Chipp. For his failure to kill Erica, Chipp and stopping the alliance, he was killed by Venom personally.

== Reception ==
The characters have often been noted as the best element of the Guilty Gear series. IGN said all the characters are very distinguishable and interesting, and remarked they "doesn't feel repetitive, even after dozens of hours of play", citing them as the reason that separates Guilty Gear from other fighting games. IGN also mentioned the character's play styles are "even more divergent" than their appearances. Game Informer stated "character complexity and unique visual design" have become hallmarks of Guilty Gear. GameSpy cited the characters as one of three reasons Guilty Gear X is "hands-down the best 2D fighting game" as of 2001, remarking that "[t]he difference in style for each character is profound". They also stated that it "has some of the coolest character designs ever seen in a game", and "one of the best casts of characters ever assembled in a fighter." GameSpot called them "unique character" and described their move-sets as "sometimes-bizarre". IGN called them "the best [...] outside Capcom/SNK", and GameSpot found them "truly awesome", noting their diversity "keeps Guilty Gear fresh". Allgame declared "superb is the only way to describe them", asserting they are all "pretty original". GamePro praised the characters' uniqueness as each have "distinct looks and strategies."

While some characters have been criticized for being "generic", "typical characters", and "unoriginal" the cast of characters in overall have also been generally described with adjectives such "bizarre", "quirk", and "crazy", with IGN noting that the series' cast makes "the biggest freak show" of Capcom, Darkstalkers, "look like a Saturday morning cartoon". Game Informer dubbed the cast "a roster of startling characters that would make Vincent Price whimper like a kitten." GameNOW even stated, "it makes me afraid to ponder the nature of the demons that have possessed the minds of the artists who created the characters ... They are among the wiliest and most violently flamboyant ever to grace a fighting game."
