= Angie =

Angie may refer to:

== People ==
- Angie (given name)
- Ängie (born 1995), Swedish pop singer
- Angie (Italian singer) (born 2001), Italian pop singer-songwriter
- Angie Nelp (born 1980), American basketball coach
- Angie Vázquez (born 2001), Mexican singer

== Arts and entertainment ==
- Angie (Angela Bofill album), 1978
- Angie (Spill Tab album), 2025
- "Angie" (song), a 1973 single by The Rolling Stones
- Angie (TV series), an ABC sitcom
- Angie (1994 film), starring Geena Davis
- Angie (1993 film), a Dutch film directed by Martin Lagestee
- Angie (novel), a 2007 Slovenian novel
- "Angie", a 2007 song by Cobra Starship from ¡Viva la Cobra!

== Other uses ==
- Angie, Louisiana, a village in the US
- Angie (mango), a named mango cultivar originating in south Florida
- Angie, an nginx fork by the former team

== See also ==
- Angela (disambiguation)
- Ange (disambiguation)
- Angi, home services directory
- Anji (disambiguation)
