= Ange (river) =

River in eastern France

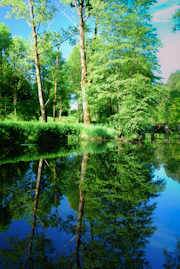
- The Ange at Montréal la Cluse

- Location within France Location within Auvergne-Rhône-Alpes

Location
- Country: France

Physical characteristics
- Mouth: Oignin
  - coordinates: 46.1714°N 5.5486°E
- Length: 20.7 km (12.9 mi)

Basin features
- Progression: Oignin→ Ain→ Rhône→ Mediterranean Sea

The Ange (French pronunciation: [ɑ̃ʒ]), less often called the Lange ([lɑ̃ʒ]), is a river in the Ain department, eastern France. It is a 20.7-kilometre (12.9 mi) left tributary of the Oignin. It flows into the Rhône by the river Ain.
