= Hu Prefecture =

Prefecture in imperial China

Huzhou or Hu Prefecture (湖州) was a zhou (prefecture) in imperial China, centering on modern Huzhou, Zhejiang, China. It existed (intermittently) from 602 until 1912. Between 1225 and 1276 it was known as Anji Prefecture (安吉州).

The modern prefecture-level city, created in 1983, retains its name.

== Geography ==
The administrative region of Hu Prefecture in the Tang dynasty is under the administration of modern Huzhou in northern Zhejiang. It probably includes parts of modern:

- Huzhou
- Anji County
- Changxing County
- Deqing County

== Population ==
In the early 1100s during the Song dynasty, there were 162,335 households and 361,698 people.

== See also ==
- Wuxing Commandery
