= Ange (given name) =

Ange is a French masculine given name and a nickname. It may refer to:

== Given name ==
- Ange Armato (born 1929), American baseball player in the All-American Girls Professional Baseball League
- Ange de Grimoard (circa 1315–1388), French cardinal
- Ange Diawara (1941–1973), Republic of the Congo politician
- Ange Flégier (1846–1927), French composer
- Ange Auguste Joseph de Laborde de Boutervilliers (1766–1786), French explorer
- Ange Leccia (born 1952), French painter, photographer and filmmaker
- Ange Mancini (born 1944), French politician
- Ange Nanizayamo (born 1998), French footballer
- Ange N'Guessan (born 1990), Ivorian footballer
- Ange McCormack (born 1996 or 1997), Australian journalist and radio presenter
- Ange Postecoglou (born 1965), Australian football coach and former player
- Ange Édouard Poungui (born 1942), Prime Minister of the Republic of the Congo
- Ange de Saint Joseph (1636–1697), French missionary friar
- Ange de Sainte-Rosalie (1655–1726), French genealogist

== Nickname ==
- Angelus de Baets (1793–1855), French painter
- Evangelos Goussis (born 1967), Australian boxer, kickboxer and murderer

== See also ==
- Angelo Lonardo (1911–2006), American mobster nicknamed "Big Ange"
