= Ainge (surname) =

Ainge is a surname. Notable people with the surname include:

- Austin Ainge (born 1981), American basketball player and coach
- Danny Ainge (born 1959), American basketball player and executive
- Edith Ainge (1873–1948), American activist
- Erik Ainge (born 1986), American football player
- Simon Ainge (born 1988), English footballer
- Tanner Ainge (born 1983), American politician
