= Guilty Gear Judgment =

2006 video game

- Developer: Arc System Works
- Publishers: Majesco (NA) (EU); Sega (JP)
- Producers: Russell Mock; Kouki Sadamori
- Designer: Takayuki Ideriha
- Composers: Osamu Aoki; Kennosuke Suemura
- Series: Guilty Gear
- Platform: PlayStation Portable
- Release: JP: August 24, 2006; NA: September 5, 2006; EU: August 3, 2007; AU: August 23, 2007
- Genre: Fighting game/Beat 'em up
- Modes: Single-player, multiplayer

Guilty Gear Judgment (ギルティギア・ジャッジメント) is a 2006 fighting/beat 'em up video game developed by Arc System Works and published by Majesco and Sega for the PlayStation Portable handheld game console as an entry in the Guilty Gear franchise.

== Gameplay ==
Guilty Gear Judgment consists of a port of Guilty Gear X2 #Reload and features a new side-scrolling single-player mode.

== Development and release ==
Majesco announced it for a spring 2006 release on January 30, 2006.

== Reception ==
Reception

Aggregate scores
Aggregator	Score
GameRankings	74%
Metacritic	77/100

Guilty Gear Judgment holds an average score of 74% on GameRankings and 77 out of 100 on Metacritic.

It was nominated for Best of E3 2006 by IGN. GameZone gave it praise as potentially being one of the "hottest" PSP fighting games.
