= Baiken =

Fictional character from Guilty Gear

- Guilty Gear character
- Baiken from Guilty Gear Xrd
- First game: Guilty Gear (1998)
- Created by: Daisuke Ishiwatari
- Voiced by: English: Patty Mattson (Strive); Japanese: Satomi Koorogi (Guilty Gear); Miho Sudou (X); Yonemoto Chizu (XX); Mayumi Asano (Xrd and Strive)

In-universe information
- Origin: Japan

Baiken (/baɪˈkɛn/; Japanese: 梅喧) is a character in Arc System Works' Guilty Gear fighting game series. Created by Daisuke Ishiwatari and first appearing in the 1998 video game Guilty Gear, Baiken was originally depicted as being male, before being changed to female tomboy to give her more impact as a character. While she was an optional boss in the first game, she has since appeared as a fully playable character in every entry since. The survivor of an attack upon Japan that cost her her family, an eye, and her right arm, Baiken seeks revenge against the man responsible. Dressed in a kimono and wielding a katana, she has a grappling hook concealed in her right sleeve, and fights by parrying her opponent's attacks. Over the course of the series she has been voiced by Satomi Koorogi, Miho Sudou, Yonemoto Chizu, Mayumi Asano, and Patty Mattson.

Baiken has been well received, described as a fan favorite. She has received significant praise for her personality and "swagger", and considered highly appealing for her rejection of feminine stereotypes often associated with characters in the same vein as her. While some criticism has been levied against the character's increased sex appeal as the games have progressed, it has also received praise for the increased discourse regarding her. The character has since appeared in several titles outside of the Guilty Gear series, including mobile games such as mobile game Crusaders Quest and the 2019 SNK-produced fighting game Samurai Shodown.

== Conception and design ==
Her design in the first game has been compared to manga character Himura Kenshin

First introduced in Guilty Gear, her role in the game was as an optional boss, meant to illustrate the importance of Japan in the series' storyline, and how rare Japanese survivors are due to the country being the first target of Gears, a race of magical bioweapons that attacked humanity prior to the events of the games. Designed by series creator Daisuke Ishiwatari, originally the character was intended to be a male ronin with a stubble beard inspired by the manga Blade of the Immortal. In his eyes, he "wanted someone that looked like they walked out of the Edo period. However, when the roster was completed he realized there was only one female character, and considered that there were very few women in fighting games overall. As a result he chose to make Baiken female instead, but kept aspects of their intended personality the same.

An amputee, Baiken is missing her right arm and left eye. While the initial concept had both arms, Ishiwatari pictured her having weapons in place of her right hand, and adjusted the design accordingly. He wanted characters like her to illustrate a "'minority' position of society", and portray them doing heroic things. As the series progressed he noted some expected him to remove her disability, however he instead wrote her story to not focus on it. In his view, just by showing those physical aspects he was able to portray Baiken as someone that actively chose to always keep living.

Standing 162 centimetres (5 ft 4 in) tall, Baiken is a woman with long pink hair in a ponytail, tattoos over her right eye and forehead, and a scar over her left eye socket. Her outfit consists of a black, red, and white kimono with a torn right sleeve, and a sarashi around her lower body. Her primarily weapon is a katana, with additional weapons hidden in her right sleeve. Ishiwatari wanted the kimono to set her silhouette apart from other characters, however feeling that a traditional design would not fit Guilty Gear's world, instead designed a semblance of one "made up of lines and such". Over the course of the franchise Baiken's design has changed little, outside of the addition of a goggle eyepatch over her left eye in Guilty Gear Xrd, and her breasts becoming larger and more prominent as the series has progressed. These design changes were meant to help give her a new look, and were inspired by Ishiwatari seeing a North American Baiken cosplayer who had incorporated Western elements into her outfit design.

In terms of personality, Baiken is a tomboy, described as easy to anger and prone to fights, as well as "loyal, self-centered, assertive, and independent of other people's opinions". Despite this, she appreciates those who accept her behavior. Her personality was intended to contrast against that of another female character, Millia Rage: where Rage was depicted as a "cool beauty", Baiken was intended to have a "sister-in-law" charm. Baiken's damaged body along with her concealed weapons were meant to represent an abandonment of femininity and her embrace of "manly superiority". Meanwhile, when designing said weapons, inspiration was taken from Blade of the Immortal and another manga, Dororo. When illustrating her, Ishiwatari wanted to show her as someone that had "given up being a woman in the setting", but still emphasize the sex appeal that came from that. In particular he felt her carefree nature would have an innate sexiness to it, but at the same time wanted to avoid portraying her as "gaudy" or "vulgar". Primary focus to this end came from showing her as "a beautiful woman in a kimono", stating that while it was possible to go for a simple Japanese look with such attire, he wanted to illustrate it as a fashion item despite admitting that may not entirely fit her personality. While he found her modest looks to be striking, in his artworks he wanted to illustrate a crass sexuality about her, without making her appear "slutty".

== Appearances ==
As introduced in the 1998 fighting game Guilty Gear, Baiken is an optional boss that is unlocked as a playable character upon defeat. Among the few people born of Japanese descent in the series, when the country was attacked by Gears she was heavily injured. Losing her family and friends, as well as an eye and arm, she declared revenge on the person responsible for the Gears' attack, Happy Chaos. However in Guilty Gear Strive, her view on the world has softened thanks to the help of others. She meets Delilah, a young girl also seeking revenge against Chaos. Taking her in, Baiken acts as a big sister to her and convinces Delilah not to ruin her life seeking revenge. Through the course of the series Baiken has been voiced in Japanese by various voice actresses including Satomi Koorogi, Miho Sudou, Yonemoto Chizu, and Mayumi Asano. In English for Strive, she is voiced by Patty Mattson.

Baiken's gameplay revolves around utilizing her "Azami" and "Kousou" moves to parry an opponent's attacks and then counterattacking. Her primary attacks consist of her sword strikes or retractable grappling hook hidden in her right sleeve to attack at mid-range. Other moves include "Tatami Mat", which creates a shockwave and can be activated midair, knocking the opponent upward if it connects. Meanwhile, "Suzuran" allows her to dash forward while parrying any standing attacks from the opponent. In Strive, she gained the ability called "Tethering", which after grabbing her opponent or hitting them with a special rope attack will allow her to more easily chain attacks together on them, at the risk of keeping the opponent close to her. The developers felt that her playstyle, and its reliance on counter-attacking, gave her a significant amount of appeal for players.

After her initial appearance, Baiken has been playable character in all subsequent Guilty Gear games, with the exception of Guilty Gear 2. Outside of the Guilty Gear series, Baiken appears as a playable character in the 2019 SNK fighting game Samurai Shodown. She also appears as part of Guilty Gear-themed crossovers with several mobile games, including Crusaders Quest, The King of Fighters '98 Ultimate Match Online, and The King of Fighters Allstar. In print media, Baiken appears in the third chapter of manga Guilty Gear Xtra, a story set between the events of the first game and its sequel. In it, she attacks the manga's protagonists due to their connection to Gear body parts falling from the sky, only to be stopped by series character Ky Kiske. In animated media, she appears in the anime Guilty Gear Strive: Dual Rulers, voiced by Asano.

== Promotion and reception ==
The character has been featured on various merchandise such as plushies and non-posable figures. As part of a collaboration between Arc System Works and distillery Wakatsuru, the latter produced a rice sake themed after the character in 2024, to celebrate the Guilty Gear series' 25th anniversary. In another collaboration, this time between Team Ninja and Arc System Works, Baiken's outfit from Xrd was one of several released as downloadable content for the character Momiji in the game Dead or Alive 5 Last Round. Similarly, a skin based on her was added for the character Maria in the mobile game #Compass. In 2020, Baiken was one of four 3D virtual reality avatars available for purchase as part of a promotion between Arc System Works and the Virtual Market 5 convention in California.

Baiken has been noted as a fan favorite character, with players jokingly coining the phrase "no Baiken, no Buy-ken" in regards to games she was excluded from. Kotaku's Ian Walker attributed much of the character's popularity to her design and attitude, stating "it's hard not to be charmed by the brash swagger she brings to every battle" and praising the character's strength. The book ”Fragile Avatars?” cited her as positive representation of disability in gaming, praising that while the primary focus was on her sword arm, her mechanical prosthesis replacing the other allowed for more elaborate combination attacks. Meanwhile, Baiken's design was cited as an inspiration for Kiyotaka Haimura for the character Tsubaki in Sword Oratoria, in particular the Japanese motif in her design.

Matt Sainsbury and Matthew Codd of DigitallyDownloaded.net considered Baiken to be a fascinating character, in part due to how she spurned feminine stereotypes despite her physique. Citing her heavy drinking and smoking, brashness, and machismo, in their opinion she represented the opposite of the "Yamato Nadeshiko" archetype he felt was often prevalent for female characters in samurai fiction. Instead, they argued that she embraced a "ronin anti-hero" vibe typically attributed to men in media, and felt the rejection of the "demure, reserved, traditional Japanese woman" cliche coupled with her wide arsenal of weapons made her one of the sexiest female characters in gaming.

Gavin Jasper of Den of Geek meanwhile stated that while he found the portrayal of Japanese characters like Baiken in Guilty Gear's fiction interesting in how they were portrayed as "incredibly rare, but also teeming with energy", he found her underwhelming. Stating that it felt like Arc System Works wanted her to be their version of Street Fighter series character Akuma due to her role as a hidden boss in the first game and upgrades in Xrd, he described her as "cool, but not cool enough to pull that off". Instead, in Jasper's eyes she fell behind other characters in a similar vein as the series progressed. He added thought that he did like her regardless, stating that despite "originally being a Kenshin palette swap with boobs", he enjoyed her intricate design, as well as elements such as her "no time for your shit" attitude and prominent drive for vengeance that helped her stand apart from similar characters.

Baiken's design, particularly its latter iterations with larger breasts, has received some criticism for sexualization. A thesis for the Federal University of Bahia cited her as an example of how Asian women are often portrayed with a sexualized orientalist design in fighting games, noting that while her kimono covers most of her body it still emphasizes her thighs and breasts. Comic Book Resources writer Sage Ashford called it out specifically as an example of fighting games overdoing fanservice, feeling that her "well endowed" design in Xrd and emphasis on her breasts via her kimono "feels like the entire point to her design". Ian Walker stated that as the series progressed she has been "pseudo-Flanderized with a design that focuses mostly on having boobs as big as her head", making her seem like a different person entirely as they've steadily grown and seemingly became in his eyes as important to her design as her prosthetic arm and missing eye. However, he did acknowledge that having large breasts did not exclude her from being a multifaceted character, and how they were utilized in a comical manner such as cushioning her fall during certain attacks. While he questioned just how much larger Arc System Works planned to make them, Walker appreciated the discourse the change to her character design caused.
