= I-No =

Fictional character from Guilty Gear

- Guilty Gear character
- I-No from Epic Seven
- First game: Guilty Gear X2 (2002)
- Created by: Daisuke Ishiwatari
- Based on: Ringo Sheena
- Voiced by: EN: Amber Lee Connors; JA: Kikuko Inoue

I-No (/ˈiːnoʊ/ EE-no; Japanese: イノ, romanized: Ino) is a character in Arc System Works' Guilty Gear fighting game series. Created by Daisuke Ishiwatari and first appearing in the 2002 video game Guilty Gear X2, she was originally conceived as a replacement for the character Justice, and a combination of a wizard and a musician. Ishiwatari designed her to be "the ultimate erotic character", making her cruel and sexually aggressive, while basing her physical appearance on musician Ringo Sheena. She is a minion of the villain Asuka R. Kreutz, though works towards her own goals, and often manipulates the other fighters against each other. Since her initial appearance, she has since gone on to appear as a playable character in most Guilty Gear games, as well as several mobile games. She is voiced in Japanese by Kikuko Inoue, and by Amber Lee Connors in the English localization of Guilty Gear Strive.

I-No has been praised for both her character's sex appeal, but also her high difficulty as a boss in Guilty Gear X2. Called one of the fighting game genre's "most magnetic fighters" by Destructoid, approval from media outlets also came in regards to her character and how she emphasized "evil as sexy", and fit the image of a "rock and roll lifestyle". Though some complained that she was often shown being defeated, her presence as a manipulator working towards her own goals and the twists with her character also saw praise. Meanwhile, fan reactions to her were seen as breathing life into the character, and that her counter-compliant nature provided her with an illusion of agency.

== Design and creation ==
I-No's design in Guilty Gear Strive was changed significantly to "allow more users to play the game".

Created for Guilty Gear X2, I-No stands 165 centimetres (5 ft 5 in) tall. I-No has a black hair in a bobcut, and wear fingerless black gloves, red thigh-high platform boots, and a choker. Her body is covered in a black and red tube dress that stops just below her breasts, while her jacket exposes her shoulders and strips of cloth dangling from it over her chest. The jacket is connected to fabric around her neck with a ring extending from it, which she can use to remove said jacket quickly. She has a witch's hat stylized after a skull, with a "mouth" she can animate to fire projectiles in some of her attacks. Her primary weapon is "Marlene", a blue guitar modeled after the Duesenberg Starplayer. In terms of personality, I-No is described as completely self-centered, and due to this sees others as just livestock able to be sacrificed. Due to her abilities she lacks empathy, though tries to keep her nature hidden unless she loses her composure.

In each installment of the series her outfit remained consistent until her appearance in Guilty Gear Strive, in which it was changed entirely. While the red witch's hat, black gloves, choker, thigh-high boots and blue guitar remained, her dress was replaced with short shorts, and a belt atop them that featured coat tails hanging off it. Meanwhile, her midriff was now exposed, with her torso covered by a black unbuttoned shirt that cups her breasts, and a cropped red leather jacket. The brim of her hat was expanded, and she now wears green sunglasses. Regarding the design change, Ishiwatari stated it was to take into account global audiences, not wanting it to be seen as due to "regulations" but instead a "change in expression" to "allow more users to play the game".

In all appearances, I-No is voiced by Kikuko Inoue in Japanese, and in Guilty Gear Strive by Amber Lee Connors in English. Much of I-No's dialogue is cruel and sexually charged, with the developers intending such to not only shock men and women alike but be captivating as well due to her portrayal as an evil woman. However, as a boss her dialogue changes to a significantly more aggressive tone. According to Inoue "She is the scariest role I've ever played. I've never said such abusive words before, and I'll probably never have a chance to say them again." However, she also wanted to express I-No as strong, due to her doing evil for her own sake rather than a reason such as revenge. Connors meanwhile stated she was a huge fan of the character's design, and during the audition period Arc System Works requested two takes, one attempting to match Inoue's tone and another with Connors' own approach to I-No's voice. The company went with the latter upon hiring her, which Connors referred to as a "dommy mommy" take on the character.

=== Conception and inspiration ===
When developing X2, they originally considered bringing back the character Justice, the final boss from the original Guilty Gear, as a playable character. Series creator Daisuke Ishiwatari however wanted instead to explore a new character that was based on several aspects of Justice, feeling that simply bringing Justice back would diminish some of their impact. When developing I-No, he gave her a "wizard-like" silhouette, while wanting to push the "limits of eroticism" with her design. He emphasized this in particular with how he drew her guitar, aiming to avoid making it feel like attacking with a baseball bat and instead appear erotic in motion, trying to plan out movements that felt interesting to watch. He wanted her color scheme to be a departure from that seen with previous Guilty Gear characters, giving her overall appearance, and heavily detailed her guitar. When project manager and animator Toshimichi Mori suggested just drawing the guitar as glossy, Ishiwatari refused and insisted that "Whatever it takes, draw it in every detail!"

While the concept originally started as a wizard, they felt the design would be too plain for Guilty Gear universe. It was considered to give her a large iron club, before deciding to make her look like a "delinquent". Going with a combination of a wizard and a musician, Ishiwatari stated it changed as he added his own tastes, wanting to portray someone that was "absolutely evil", but also the "ultimate erotic character". To complete the aesthetic, her guitar was meant to take the place of a witch's broom, allowing her to fly while straddling it. His concept art focused not only on heavily detailing her props such as her hat and guitar, but also the shape of her breasts under her jacket and her underwear, with several pieces depicting her near nude. Her name was inspired by musician Brian Eno, while physically she was based on musician Ringo Sheena. Ishiwatari stated the similarity was not originally intentional, and came about due to modelling her after "the most feminine person" he knew, even giving I-No a beauty mark in the same position as Sheena's. He noted that when coming up with the design, he even considered asking her to provide the character's voice. A key element Ishiwatari had in his mind regarding her character was "the fear of women from my perspective", and when illustrating her tried to maintain that image by changing her characteristics in various ways. In-game, I-No is often portrayed in "lewd situations" according to Ishiwatari, something he felt was a key part of her character.

== Appearances ==
I-No first appears in Guilty Gear X2 as a playable character, while also serving as the antagonist and final boss. She works under series villain Asuka R. Kreutz, though of her own accord due to wanting to see what happens when his plans come to fruition. To this end she tries to eliminate anyone that can impede his goals, particularly manipulating the other characters against each other to this end. Able to manipulate time and causality, Guilty Gear Xrd reveals she is a magic being created from humanity's "hopes and desires" for a better future, with half of her power having been stolen by villain Happy Chaos to prevent her from becoming all-powerful and destroying the world. After this revelation, I-No becomes obsessed with finding the answer to her purpose in Guilty Gear Strive. However even after recovering her power she is unable to, and tries to pass her abilities onto all of humanity so they might be able to in the future, despite the consequences. The protagonists fight her, and in the ensuing battle her body is destroyed. In her dying moments, I-No realizes that fellow time traveller Axl Low is an alternate timeline incarnation of her former boyfriend Will, and she uses her powers to reunite him with her counterpart from his timeline, Megumi.

When designing her gameplay they pulled from several elements of Justice's, in particular her projectile attacks as well as allowing her to fight well while in the air, while also having effective close-range attack options. Of the moves they designed for, "Megalomania", an attack that fills the screen with projectiles after a pause, proved to be the hardest to create. In addition to her aerial gameplay, she can also quickly rush down opponents, dashing forward with attacks such as "Sultry Performance" or "Stroke the Big Tree". Meanwhile, attacks such as "Antidepressant Scale" fire a projectile that she can control the vertical trajectory of, and does increased damage the farther it travels. I-No was designed to be more difficult to use overall, and a character they wanted players to practice with heavily. However, with Strive, they simplified some of the inputs necessary for her attacks, to try and increase her accessibility for players.

After her initial appearance, I-No has been playable character in all subsequent Guilty Gear games, with the exception of Guilty Gear 2. In external media, she appears in the audio plays Guilty Gear XX Drama CD Red and Guilty Gear XX Drama CD Black, stories set in an alternate timeline where the death of character Ky Kiske prior to the events of the first game has caused drastic changes to the storyline and characters. I-No also appears as part of Guilty Gear-themed crossovers with several mobile games, including Medal Masters, Epic Seven, Crusaders Quest, and The King of Fighters Allstar.

== Promotion and reception ==
I-No's animations received praise and criticism for their sexually charged nature, particularly her winpose.

Several figures were released of I-No, including a 1/7th scale figure by Max Factory, and gashapon figures produced by Yujin. As part of a collaboration between Team Ninja and Arc System Works, I-No's outfit was one of several released as downloadable content for the character Ayane in the game Dead or Alive 5 Last Round. In the mobile game Tales of the Rays, I-No's outfit from Strive was added as an option for character Alice to wear. While using it, Alice gains the ability to use I-No's "Antidepression Scale" and "Megalomania" attacks.

Cited as an example of an "unmistakably Japanese" influence in the designs of the Guilty Gear series by GameRevolution's Johnny Liu, I-No has been positively received since her introduction. IGN praised her sexual display in X2, and called her their favorite new character design. Other outlets offered similar praise, such as GameDaily and Complex, while also acknowledging her high difficulty to fight against as a boss. She was also featured in Play magazine's "Girls of Gaming" periodicals, which praised the complexities of her character and the enigma around her, thought stated "does it really matter when she's this...uh...alluring?"

Chris Moyse of Destructoid stated that I-No was one of the "poster characters" of the Guilty Gear series, stating that her "cool style and super-sexualized nature" had won over fans, and further called her one of the fighting game genre's "most magnetic fighters". In an earlier editor piece, the staff praised her as "badass", stating that "Sexy and deadly are always a good combination", and while fighting games had other characters that fit a similar theme they hadn't captured that aspect quite like I-No. While they noted the "evil is sexy" trope was common in gaming, they praised how it was not her sole defining trait, though acknowledged that sex appeal was a significant factor in her character through her voice and portrayal. Instead while she worked under the franchise's series villain, she was not portrayed as his puppet but a mastermind in her own right, manipulating other characters to her own ends. Additional praise came from how formidable she was to fight against, and her use of music in her fighting style.

Jasper Gavin of Den of Geek praised the character's personality, feeling that her aesthetic as a "guitar-playing nymphomaniac" suited her lack of concern over consequences, essentially living "the rock 'n' roll lifestyle" due to her immortality and corruption. He echoed Destructoid's approval that while she was a minion to the series' main villain "it's still her nature to mess with him by stepping out of bounds", maintaining a self-serving personality that puts anyone that falls in line with her whims "in deep shit". He further called the twist that she represented mankind's hopes and desire's interesting due to how well it played into her "kinky demeanor", but at the same time tragic for how jaded her character seemed. However he also criticized how inconsistently the series portrayed how powerful she was, and despite the emphasis on her being a "major threat, and a mysterious one at that", the games often showed her being defeated, sometimes by the person she had just defeated.

Comic book and WomenWriteAboutComics editor Claire Napier praised her character overall, in part due to her witch aesthetic, but moreso due to her personality which portrayed her as both vulgar and sexually charged through her verbal and body language. In terms of design she praised how well the emphasis of red worked with her appearance, and helped highlight the contrast of her guitar against her and gave an "unsettling" feel as it appeared to "cut through" her design. While she was critical of some aspects of her portrayal, particular the logistics behind a winpose where she tears off her jacket in one motion, she acknowledged the realism behind other elements of her design counterbalanced this. She additionally acknowledged the character's popularity in cosplay, and how cosplayers would often add additional bits to the costume to "reel back into their comfort zones". Napier felt this fit I-No's "do wot I want" mentality, and helped "breathe life" into I-No that her designers had not initially intended. She additionally called I-No "counter-compliant" enough to "produce the illusion of agency", stating that while some decisions the developers chose with her such as her frequent defeats should be criticized, "there's enough character informing the design that I don't feel shortchanged".
