= Dizzy (Guilty Gear) =

Fictional character from Guilty Gear

- Guilty Gear character
- Dizzy from Guilty Gear XX Accent Core
- First game: Guilty Gear X (2000)
- Created by: Daisuke Ishiwatari
- Voiced by: EN: Kira Buckland; JA: Kazue Fujita

Dizzy (Japanese: ディズィー, Hepburn: Dizī) is a character in Arc System Works' Guilty Gear fighting game series. Created by Daisuke Ishiwatari and first appearing in the 2000 video game Guilty Gear X, she acts as the game's final boss. Designed to resemble an angel, Ishiwatari wanted to illustrate the contrast of a character feared for her abilities despite her appearance. Her wings Necro and Undine have distinct personalities, attacking on her behalf due to her nature of hating conflict. Since her initial appearance she has returned as a playable character in most subsequent Guilty Gear series titles, as well as several mobile games and the ecchi game Queen's Gate: Spiral Chaos. In all appearances, she is voiced by Kazue Fujita, with Kira Buckland providing her English voice for Guilty Gear Strive.

Dizzy has been well received since her release, praised for both her design but also her character. She was also seen as adding depth to the series, particularly in regards to the central conflict and in contrast to how final bosses are often handled in fighting games. However, some concerns have been voiced in regards to her character's handling, particularly due to her young age despite being established as a mother in later games. Necro and Undine meanwhile have been examined in a study of how male and female characters are portrayed in fighting games, particularly in regards to how male characters are often allowed to be monstrous compared to their female counterparts.

== Conception and design ==
Introduced in Guilty Gear X as the game's final boss, Dizzy stands 167 centimetres (5 ft 5 1/2 in) tall, and is described as a woman with an "honest and pure heart" that hates conflict. Appearing as a girl in her teens, she has long blue hair fashioned into twintails behind her head, and bangs that frame her face. Dizzy's normal outfit consists of a black and white leather outfit that crisscrosses over her breasts while exposing her stomach, shoulders, and thighs. Black stockings cover her legs, while white boots cover her feet. Additionally, she has a long black tail, and matching yellow bows on her tail and the back of her head. She has two large feathered wings that protrude from her back, with the right one green and the left light blue. Called Necro and Undine, these wings act as independent defense units, able to transform into the semblance of a grim reaper and a woman respectively, and have independent personalities separate from Dizzy's. Meanwhile, her silhouette was meant to resemble that of Justice, the boss of the preceding game, in an effort to "make her look intimidating, no matter what."

When developing Guilty Gear X, series creator Daisuke Ishiwatari decided early on that the game's final boss would be female to continue what he felt would be a trend established by the previous game. He focused on designing a character that could summon a variety of projectiles, while also being "flashy enough" to be distinct from ordinary people. Her design was built around the duality of her being seen as dangerous due to her abilities, while resembling an angel with a gentle personality. Her tail and wings were heavily detailed to give her a dynamic expression, with Ishiwatari wanting her feathers to stand out as her main feature. He added a bow on her tail to represent her desire to be human. For many of her attacks, Necro and Undine act in the place of her arms and legs, particularly her special attacks, and were meant to highlight Dizzy's role as both a "god of death" and a "goddess" as well as give her more personality. The handling of Dizzy's hair was emphasized by Ishiwatari in her concept art, with each pigtail folded upon itself to keep it mostly above her shoulders. Her name is derived from December, due to Ishiwatari wanting to keep a theme of month-based names after developing the character May. In illustrations depicting moments after X's conclusion, he wanted to depict her happy and smiling "for once", showing her new home as a place of comfort where she could "live" rather than just "survive".

In subsequent appearances her design was kept consistent until Guilty Gear Xrd, in which she was given a long white shirt that covered her torso and midsection, while emphasizing her cleavage. In addition her hair was lengthened, extending more visibly behind her. It was changed again for Guilty Gear Strive, where she is now called Queen Dizzy. Her outfit was changed to a long black and blue dress skirt that exposes her right leg and thigh, a white top with a black ribbon tie at the collar and flowing sleeves, and bracers covering her hands extending her fingers. Her hair, while still framing her face, is now more loose and adorned with white and yellow flowers. Necro and Undine's designs were also changed, now appearing black with the top halves of their faces obscured; Necro's by a white shawl that covers his back, while Undine's white hair covers her brow and gives similar coverage.

== Appearances ==
As introduced in the 2000 fighting game Guilty Gear X, Dizzy acts as the game's final boss and a playable character. Her father is Sol Badguy, while her mother is Justice, a member of a race of magical bioweapons called Gears. Taken in by adoptive parents as an infant, by the time of X her body has matured despite being three years old, making her Gear heritage apparent. Hiding in a nearby forest, she meets the character Testament who watches after her, and is later taken in by another character Johnny as part of his airship pirate crew. After the events of Guilty Gear XX, she meets Ky Kiske, and after falling in love they have a son named Sin. In all appearances she is voiced by Kazue Fujita, with Kira Buckland providing her English voice for Strive.

In terms of gameplay, Dizzy was given a wide range of projectile attacks, but few defensive options outside of her high mobility, with players meant to keep opponents at a distance. She uses her wings to attack, with Undine specializing in ice attacks, able to generate pillars and spikes to knock the opponent away, while Necro attacks by generating arrows and a large sword. One of her strongest attacks, "Imperial Ray", fires a beam along the ground that generates a series of explosions. Throughout the series, Dizzy has lacked an "instant kill" attack available to every other character due to her pacifist nature. However, in Xrd, she received a variation of the concept with the move "Gamma Ray", where Necro would fire a large projectile before Dizzy pushes his arm away to protect the opponent. After the projectile explodes in a mushroom cloud in the distance, the opponent surrenders out of shock.

After her initial appearance, Dizzy has been a playable character in all subsequent Guilty Gear games, with the exception of Guilty Gear 2. In extended media for the Guilty Gear series, she is featured in a side story on audio play collection Guilty Gear X Drama CD Vol.2, which tells how she met and befriended Testament, while evading the assassin Venom. She also appears in Guilty Gear XX Drama CD Black, which showcases an alternate timeline where Dizzy embraces her Gear heritage and attacks humanity. A side story set in the main timeline was additionally included, where Dizzy has a misadventure while bringing a letter to Testament. In animated media, she appears in Guilty Gear Strive: Dual Rulers, an anime set during the events of Strive. In it, she marries Ky despite their society's ongoing disdain towards human/Gear relations. It later revealed in an alternate timeline she has a daughter, Unika, who travels to the past.

Outside of the Guilty Gear series, a gamebook for the Queen's Gate series of ecchi books was produced featuring Dizzy, and she later appeared in the related game Queen's Gate: Spiral Chaos. She also appears as a playable character in the 2020 Arc System Works crossover beat 'em up game Code Shifter. Dizzy has also appeared in several mobile games, including #Compass, Crusaders Quest, Epic Seven, Star Ocean: Anamnesis, Brave Frontier, The King of Fighters '98 Ultimate Match Online, and The King of Fighters Allstar.

== Promotion and merchandise ==
Dizzy has been promoted through various merchandise for the series, including t-shirts, plushies and cosplay outfits. In 2020, Dizzy was one of four 3D virtual reality avatars available for purchase as part of a promotion between Arc System Works and the Virtual Market 5 convention in California. In 2022, Fairy Tail Co., Ltd released a promotional perfume inspired by the character, meant to have a citrus scent. As part of a collaboration between Arc System Works and distillery Wakatsuru, the latter produced a malt whiskey themed after the character in 2024, to celebrate the Guilty Gear series' 25th anniversary. In another collaboration, this time between Team Ninja and Arc System Works, Dizzy's outfit from Xrd was one of several released as downloadable content for character Nyotengu in the game Dead or Alive 5 Last Round.

Additionally, several figures and sculptures of Dizzy have also been produced. Nendoroid released a chibi figure of her in 2021 as part of their signature line, which featured wings that could be replaced with likenesses of Necro and/or Undine. Two 1/8th scale figures were released by model company Alter for her appearance in Guilty Gear XX Accent Core, featuring her primary and secondary color palettes from the game. Another 1/8th scale figure was released by Kotobukiya, for her appearances in Queen's Gate: Spiral Chaos. Meanwhile, two diorama figures were released, based on her Xrd appearance by Kinetiquettes and Prime 1 Studio.

== Critical reception ==
Dizzy received praise for both her characterization and her animations.

Matt Sainsbury of DigitallyDownloaded.net described Dizzy as the "ultimate in fighting game characters", praising both aspects of her appearance as well as personality, but particularly for her sex appeal. While he acknowledged that the Guilty Gear series had many well designed characters, he felt that she "takes the cake by a significant margin". In their review of Guilty Gear X, the staff of Gameshark described her as a character that "defies description", calling Necro and Undine "a devil and angel in her soul" and praising their appearances in her attacks. Japanese website ITmedia meanwhile compared her to a "special seafood bowl" due to her complex combination of traits such as her physical age, role as a mother, and character design. They additionally noticed fans reacted positively to the nature of her "instant kill" attack in Xrd, who called it "innovative" and "interesting".

In terms of her character, Gavin Jasper of Den of Geek stated that Dizzy bucked a trend of sequel fighting games introducing a more imposing final boss than its predecessor. Instead, in Guilty Gear X, she was presented as "a confused Disney princess in fetish gear who is powerful enough to destroy humanity" that just wanted to relax in the forest. He stated that through this characterization it brought depth to the series' war against Gears, painting a formerly "black and white" conflict grey. However, he lamented that while she was portrayed as strong, she was constantly held back due to her pacifism and plot contrivance. Though he felt the story sidelined her as a character as the series progressed, he still found her role as a "minor character who is capable of leveling cities with her grim reaper wing" fascinating.

Meanwhile, Todd Ciolek of Anime News Network observed that some fans disliked what they perceived as her "meek 'moe' aura", and further the contradiction of her mentally being in her twenties despite only being physically three years old, something Ciolek felt was a reverse of a particular trend in anime media of a much older character in a younger female body. Destructoid writer Chris Carter also voiced some concerns over Sin's existence, stating it was possible "Dizzy could have aged a bit more by the events of Xrd, but it’s just...weird, even for Guilty Gear standards."

Necro and Undine were the subject of discussion in a dissertation by Perdosa Guilherme and Georgia da Cruz Pedrosa of the Federal University of Bahia. In their thesis regarding video game character designs in fighting games, they observed that the masculine Necro was presented as a monstrous cloaked figure whereas Undine was depicted as a scantily attired feminine humanoid. They felt this continued a trend in fighting games of female representation pursuing "the ideal of beauty", while also observing that both were aspects of the same character.
