= Adrian Moore =

Adrian Moore may refer to:

- Adrian William Moore, British philosopher and broadcaster
- Adrian Moore (composer) (born 1969), British musician
- Adrian Moore (French actor), French actor, known for Mia and Me and Certified Copy (film)
- Adrian Moore (German actor), German actor, known for Lessons of a Dream
- Adrian Moore (rapist), former Australian police officer and convicted rapist.
- Adrian Moore, television series character on Nip/Tuck; see list of characters
