= Ayashii Omawari-san =

Japanese manga series

- First tankōbon volume cover

怪しいおまわりさん
- Genre: Comedy, slice of life
- Manga
- Written by: Mukisitsu
- Published by: Shueisha
- Imprint: Young Jump Comics
- Magazine: Tonari no Young Jump
- Original run: October 2, 2024 – present
- Volumes: 3

Ayashi Omawari-san (怪しいおまわりさん) is a Japanese manga series written and illustrated by Mukishitsu. It began serialization on Shueisha's Tonari no Young Jump manga website in October 2024.

== Synopsis ==
The series is centered around the lives of four police officers in a small police box who deal with the issues in their town.

== Characters ==
Ashikawa (芦川)
Voiced by: Tomokazu Sugita (PV)
Izaki (井崎)
Voiced by: Tatsuhisa Suzuki (PV)

== Media ==
=== Manga ===
Written and illustrated by Mukishitsu, Ayashii Omawari-san began serialization on Shueisha's Tonari no Young Jump manga website on October 2, 2024. Its chapters have been compiled into three tankōbon volumes as of June 2026.

No.	Release date	ISBN
1	April 17, 2025	978-4-08-893636-9
2	December 18, 2025	978-4-08-894077-9
3	June 18, 2026	978-4-08-894259-9

=== Other ===
A promotional video commemorating the release of the first volume on April 17, 2025 was uploaded to the Young Jump Manga TV YouTube that same day. It featured voice performances from Tomokazu Sugita and Tatsuhisa Suzuki.

== Reception ==
The series was ranked twelfth in the Nationwide Bookstore Employees' Recommended Comics list of 2026. The series was nominated for the eleventh Next Manga Awards in 2025 in the web category.
