= Dance with Devils =

Japanese anime television series

- Promotional artwork for the anime series.

ダンス ウィズ デビルス (Dansu Wizu Debirusu)
- Genre: Musical, reverse harem, romance
- Manga

Dance with Devils -Blight-
- Written by: Samako Natsu
- Published by: Square Enix
- Magazine: GFantasy
- Original run: 18 September 2015 – present
- Volumes: 2
- Anime television series
- Directed by: Ai Yoshimura
- Produced by: Hiroyuki Tanaka; Hiroko Hosoya; Kazuhiro Asō; Jun Fukuda; Kozue Kaneniwa
- Written by: Tomoko Konparu
- Music by: Elements Garden: Junpei Fujita; Evan Call
- Studio: Brain's Base
- Licensed by: NA: Funimation
- Original network: Tokyo MX, Sun TV, BS Fuji
- English network: NA: Funimation
- Original run: 7 October 2015 – 23 December 2015
- Episodes: 12
- Video game
- Developer: Rejet
- Publisher: Rejet
- Music by: Elements Garden
- Genre: Otome game
- Platform: PlayStation Vita
- Released: 24 March 2016
- Anime film

Dance with Devils: Fortuna
- Directed by: Ai Yoshimura
- Written by: Tomoko Konparu
- Music by: Elements Garden
- Studio: Brain's Base
- Released: 4 November 2017
- Video game

Dance with Devils: My Carol
- Developer: Rejet
- Publisher: Rejet
- Music by: Elements Garden
- Genre: Otome game
- Platform: PlayStation Vita
- Released: 22 March 2018

Dance with Devils (Japanese: ダンス ウィズ デビルス, Hepburn: Dansu Wizu Debirusu) is a Japanese anime television series. It began airing in October 2015 and has been licensed in North America by Funimation. A manga began serialization in GFantasy in September 2015. It is often abbreviated as "DWD" or DanDevi (ダンデビ Dandebi).

== Plot ==
Ritsuka Tachibana, a second-year high school student who attends Shikō Academy, lives a peaceful and quiet life with her mother, Maria Tachibana in Shikō Town. One day, she is summoned to the "Third Library", which is not allowed for students to enter except the members of the student council, on suspicion of violating school rules. There she meets the head of the student council, Rem Kaginuki and its other members; Urie Sogami, Mage Nanashiro, and Shiki Natsumezaka. After claiming her innocence and leaving the library, Ritsuka returns home to find that her house has been ransacked and her mother has been kidnapped. In addition, she is attacked by mysterious men who are searching for the whereabouts of a mysterious magic book known as the "Forbidden Grimoire", which will enable anyone who possesses it to rule the world. As her normal life falls apart, Ritsuka becomes embroiled in the conflict between the devils and vampires seeking to obtain the Forbidden Grimoire...

== Characters ==
Ritsuka Tachibana (立華 リツカ, Tachibana Ritsuka)
Voiced by: Himika Akaneya (Japanese); Dawn M. Bennett (English)
A sixteen year old second-year student of Shikō Academy. She lived with her mother, Maria Tachibana, in Shikō Town before Jek ransacked their house and kidnapped her mother. She is, in fact, the "Forbidden Grimoire", leading the demons and vampires into a competition to obtain her. She wears a pendant containing potpourri given to her by her mother, which was intended to mask the scent of the grimoire. The grimoire's scent becomes more prominent when it reacts to Ritsuka's strong emotions in the form of a bright light that is unleashed from her body, and if it is removed from her, she will die. In episode 10, it is revealed that she is half-human and half-devil, due to her father being the fallen Demon King, Lord Maksis.
Rem Kaginuki (鉤貫 レム, Kaginuki Remu)
Voiced by: Sōma Saitō (Japanese); Garrett Storms (English)
A high-ranking devil and the head of the academy's student council. He is the heir of the Arlond family in the Demon Realm. At first, he only sees Ritsuka as a 'pawn' in order to find out the location of the grimoire, but over time, he starts to develop genuine feelings for her.
Lindo Tachibana (立華 リンド, Tachibana Rindo)
Voiced by: Wataru Hatano (Japanese); Gregory Lush (English)
Ritsuka's cousin, born a year before her. His real mother, Marta Tachibana died when he was young, and Maria Tachibana raised him and her daughter, Ritsuka as siblings since then. After being charged by their grandfather to protect the Tachibana family, he traveled to England to become an exorcist, returning after their mother's kidnapping and enrolling at Shikō Academy. He is very protective of Ritsuka, due to his feelings for her that go beyond family affection. When he is enraged, especially regarding someone threatening Ritsuka, his eyes will turn red and his fingernails transform into claws. In episode nine, it is revealed that he is a dhamphir, half-human, half-vampire.
Urie Sogami (楚神 ウリエ, Sogami Urie)
Voiced by: Takashi Kondō (Japanese); Aaron Roberts (English)
A womanizing devil (incubus) who serves as the vice-president of the student council. While he is not equal to Rem in status, they are closely matched in power.
Mage Nanashiro (南那城 メイジ, Nanashiro Meiji)
Voiced by: Subaru Kimura (Japanese); Ricco Fajardo (English)
An athletic and self-confident devil who serves as the student council's secretary.
Shiki Natsumezaka (棗坂 シキ, Natsumezaka Shiki)
Voiced by: Daisuke Hirakawa (Japanese); Seth Magill (English)
A sadistic fallen angel who serves as treasurer for the student council.
Maria Tachibana (立華 マリア, Tachibana Maria)
Voiced by: Hibiku Yamamura (Japanese); Morgan Garrett (English)
Ritsuka's mother. She was kidnapped by Jek at the beginning of the series. It is later revealed in episode 10 that she is, in fact, the wife of the fallen Demon King, Lord Maksis.
Azuna Kuzuha (葛葉 アズナ, Kuzuha Azuna)
Voiced by: Risae Matsuda (Japanese); Katherine Bourne (English)
Ritsuka's best friend at school. She cares for Ritsuka and is always worried when her friend gets caught up with the Student Council whom she doesn't trust nor like. In episode six, she is revealed to be an exorcist. She is killed by Jek in episode eight.
Loewen (ローエン, Rōen)
Voiced by: Kazutomi Yamamoto (dog), Tatsuhisa Suzuki (human) (Japanese); Derick Snow (English)
Rem's pet Pomeranian. He is terrified of Shiki due to the latter's tendency to torment him. It is revealed in episode seven that he is in fact Cerberus, the same as the mysterious person who can pass in and out of the third library freely, and is the servant of Lord Maksis; he wishes to procure the grimoire to help his master's fading strength.
Jek (ジェキ, Jeki)
Voiced by: Yuuto Suzuki (Japanese); Dave Trosko (English)
A vampire who is searching for the prohibited grimoire. He has an army of minions under his control. He is in the service of an entity named Nesta.
Nesta (ネスタ, Nesuta)
Voiced by: Keiji Fujiwara (Japanese); J. Michael Tatum (English)
The king of the vampires. He is searching for the grimoire, hoping to use it to overthrow the devils. Jek is one of his many servants. He is Lindo's biological father, having seduced Marta in an attempt to learn the secrets of the grimoire.
Marta Tachibana (立華 マルタ, Tachibana Maruta)
Voiced by: Kanami Sato (Japanese); Leah Clark (English)
Ritsuka's deceased maternal aunt and Lindo's mother. She died before the events of the series.
Maksis (マクシス, Makushisu)
A devil king and Ritsuka's father. His servant, Loewen, is searching for the grimoire so that he may regain his lost power. In episode 10, it is revealed that he initially got close to Ritsuka's grandfather in order to trick him into sharing with him the secrets of the grimoire, until he met Maria whom he fell in-love with and married, resulting in Ristuka's birth. When he learned that the "Forbidden Grimoire" slept within his daughter, he was overjoyed as it meant he would be able to rule not just the whole of the Demon Realm, but Heaven and earth would be in his hands as well.

== Media ==
=== Anime ===
The anime television series is produced as a collaboration between video game developer company Rejet, music studio Elements Garden, and music company Avex. The series is directed by Ai Yoshimura, with the animation studio Brain's Base producing the animation. The series is written by Tomoko Konparu, based on a concept by Daisuke Iwasaki and Grimoire Henshūshitsu. Hirotaka Maeda and Yuka Takashina provide the series character designs. Junpei Fujita and DIVE II Entertainment produce the series' music, which is composed by Elements Garden. The opening theme song is "Kakusei no Air" (覚醒のAir; Air of Awakening) by Wataru Hatano, and the closing theme song is "Mademo★iselle" by Pentacle★, a group composed of Sōma Saitō, Wataru Hatano, Takashi Kondo, Subaru Kimura, and Daisuke Hirakawa. It aired on Tokyo MX, Sun TV, and BS Fuji starting on 7 October 2015. Funimation licensed the series for release and simulcast in North America. Funimation also offered a "broadcast dub" for the series, starting on 11 November 2015.

An anime theatrical film was announced at a Dance with Devils concert event on 29 January 2017, titled Dance with Devils: Fortuna. It was released on 4 November 2017, with the staff and cast from the anime series returning to reprise their roles in the film.

==== Episode list ====
No.	Title	Original release date
1	"Depravity and the Forbidden Quadrille"; Transliteration: "Dai Ichi-maku Tōsaku to Kindan no Kadorīru" (Japanese: 第一幕 倒錯と禁断のカドリール)	7 October 2015
Ritsuka is summoned by the student council on suspicion of breaking school rules. As Rem, the student council president, approaches her, he is repelled by the amulet she wears; however, she is unaware of this. Later, she goes home to find her mother injured and strange men ransacking her home. She flees and calls the police, but when they arrive her house is undamaged and her mother is gone. Frightened, she calls her brother, who tells her to stay at her best friend, Azuna's home. She is attacked by the men while on the way there, and they demand that she reveal the location of the "Forbidden Grimoire". Rem arrives and saves her, taking her home with him. He agrees to help her, but makes it clear that he is not doing so for her sake, but to keep peace at the academy.
2	"Jitterbug of Doubts and Secrets"; Transliteration: "Dai Ni-maku Mayoi to Himitsu no Jiruba" (Japanese: 第二幕 迷いと秘密のジルバ)	14 October 2015
Ritsuka is summoned to the student council room again, where Urie, Mage, and Shiki attempt to make advances on her before Rem arrives. He informs her that the police have tracked the signal from her mother's phone to the house of her grandfather, a student of magic and magical lore. When Ritsuka mentions that her grandfather's research and materials are still at his house, Rem immediately takes her there. Upon arriving at the house, they find it ransacked and they both get locked inside. A fire starts, and when Ritsuka goes to get the extinguisher she is again attacked by the people who kidnapped her mother. Rem saves her and tells her to run, then confronts the attackers. He informs them that Ritsuska is his before using magic to turn them into dust. Later that evening, when they arrive back at Rem's house, they find Ritsuka's brother Lindo waiting for them.
3	"Tango of Passion and Seduction"; Transliteration: "Dai San-maku Jōnetsu to Yūwaku no Tango" (Japanese: 第三幕 情熱と誘惑のタンゴ)	21 October 2015
Lindo takes Ritsuka home, ignoring Rem's greetings. The next morning, he tells her not to leave the house, then sprinkles holy water around the property before leaving. Urie arrives, but is unable to cross the line of holy water. He informs Ritsuka that they have information on her mother, and offers to take her to Rem. However, he instead takes her to a large conservatory, where he attempts to hypnotize her but is repelled by her pendant. When she runs away, the conservatory suddenly becomes dark and a carnival magically appears, and she is chased by a group of girls with masks and strange marks on their necks who Urie calls his "butterflies". He then appears and saves her from them at the last moment, and they hide. Urie then reveals that he was lying about her mother, but then tries to break her trust in her brother by revealing that Lindo has been training as an exorcist in England without her knowledge. Putting her in a trance once again, he questions her on the location of the grimoire before ordering her to remove the amulet. Rem then arrives and rescues her, and she flees. Outside, she finds Lindo looking for her, and they leave for home, as she wonders how he knew where she was.
4	"Bolero of Solitude and Melancholy"; Transliteration: "Dai Yon-maku Kodoku to Aishū no Borero" (Japanese: 第四幕 孤独と哀愁のボレロ)	28 October 2015
Ritsuka wakes up to find that Lindo has chained the windows shut to protect her. When she asks him about being an exorcist, he tells her how their grandfather's research into the occult attracted the attention of vampires and devils, who laid a fatal curse on him. On his deathbed, he tasked Lindo with becoming an exorcist to protect Ritsuka and their mother. He explains that in the conflict between devils and vampires, both are searching for the forbidden grimoire to obtain victory, and also informs her that the members of the student council are all devils. Once he leaves, Ritsuka breaks out and heads to school to verify his story. Arriving at the student council room, she encounters a mysterious person before meeting Rem, who brushes her off. She later runs into him again, and he brings her to an empty storeroom, where she begins to suspect he isn't actually Rem. Meanwhile, Lindo arrives at the school after Azuna texts him. He finds Ritsuka just as she is attacked by a group of Rem duplicates. As they savagely beat him, Ritsuka cries out for them to stop, and her pendant breaks. Lindo exorcises them, revealing that they were in fact an illusion controlled by the mysterious figure Ritsuka encountered earlier. Back at their house, Lindo gives Ritsuka a ring of the Sacred Lux, an item that will protect her. He also reveals that he will be attending her school starting tomorrow.
5	"B-Boying of Vainglory and Impulse"; Transliteration: "Dai Go-maku Dokuzon to Shōhaku no Burēkin" (Japanese: 第五幕 独尊と衝迫のブレーキン)	4 November 2015
Mage bursts in while Ritsuka is in class, kidnapping her and taking her to the Tokyo Tower. He threatens her in his true demonic form in an attempt to extract the location of the grimoire, but is repelled by her ring. He then attempts to seduce her into telling him by treating her to a meal, but she runs away. In a back alley, she is threatened by a gang of thugs, but Mage catches up with her, allowing her to escape while he fights the thugs, devouring their souls. As she runs, she is found by Rem, who brings her to a helipad to send her back home. Still believing that he helped her out of kindness, she confronts him, and he reluctantly admits that he only needs her as a pawn in his game for power. Mage then finds them, taking Ritsuka and escaping through a portal. In an attempt to cheer her up, he takes her to watch the sun set over the ocean, but accidentally drops her in the water when he becomes captivated by her smell. Passing through a portal again, they find Lindo waiting for them. Seeing that Ritsuka is soaking wet, his eyes become red and he goes into a rage, attacking Mage. The two battle with magic, forcing Ritsuka to jump between them. Mage decides to withdraw, promising that he will return to claim her.
6	"Farandole of Reminiscence and Labyrinths"; Transliteration: "Dai Roku-maku Tsuisō to Meikyū no Farandōru" (Japanese: 第六幕 追想と迷宮のファランドール)	11 November 2015
Ritsuka finds Shiki in the school garden destroying thorned roses with his bare hands. She stops him and Shiki tells her that he was doing so because he thought that she might want to help him. Shiki reveals to Ristuka that he is a fallen angel. He suddenly tells her that he may know the whereabouts of her mother and he offers to take her there. Ristuka is hesitant, due to her previous encounters with the other members of the Student Council, until Azuna interferes. Shiki allows Azuna to accompany them. He takes the girls to a nearby art museum with many hallways like a maze. He disappears and Ritsuka gets separated from Azuna, becoming lost. While wandering around the museum, Ritsuka catches glimpses of her family's past until Shiki grabs her from behind. He tells her to become his, but Ritsuka pushes him away, prompting Shiki to use his powers to freeze her. He threatens to kill her if she doesn't comply, but Azuna intervenes by repelling him with a capsule of holy water. She attempts to exorcise him, but Shiki reveals that he can't be exorcized due to the angel blood within him. Black wings sprout from his back and he attacks the girls, wounding Azuna in the process. As he is about to kill her, Ritsuka convinces him to stop, and he teleports them back to the school garden where they first met. As Shiki begins to leave, Ritsuka asks him if he lied about knowing where her mother is, but he only replies by saying that lies are truth before disappearing.
7	"Pas de Deux of Fantasy and Innocence"; Transliteration: "Dai Nana-maku Gensō to Junshin no Pa do Du" (Japanese: 第七幕 幻想と純真のパ・ド・ドゥ)	18 November 2015
While Rem is being rebuked by his father for failing to obtain the grimoire, Shiki takes the opportunity to slip out in search of Ritsuka with Urie and Mage following behind him. Meanwhile, Ritsuka is shopping with Azuna when she comes across Loewen in the store. Following him outside, she is shocked when he transforms into the mysterious person from episode four and introduces himself as Cerberus, a servant of the fiend Maksis. He then offers to take her to the demon realm to learn the secrets of the grimoire. Shiki leads Mage and Urie to Azuna, hoping she can tell them where Ritsuka is, but they are forced to flee when Lindo arrives. Meanwhile, Loewen reveals to Ritsuka that she is, in fact, the forbidden grimoire, and her powers will be released on her seventeenth birthday. He tries to convince her to wait in the demon realm until that time comes, but Rem arrives and tells her not to. Loewen seizes her and threatens to rip her heart out if she doesn't come with him, but she repels him with the ring of the Sacred Lux. Lindo then arrives, and seeing Ritsuka bleeding from Loewen's injury, he blames Rem and attacks him. Ritsuka begs her brother to stop, but his eyes turn red and he grows claws, lashing at her when she gets in his way. Suddenly realizing what he is doing, he reverts to his normal self and Rem disappears. That night, Lindo tells Ritsuka that both he and their mother knew that she was the grimoire; the pendant that their mother gave her contained holy potpourri meant to mask the grimoire's scent. Going to bed, Ritsuka wonders who she can trust now.
8	"Waltz of Transience"; Transliteration: "Dai Hachi-maku Karisome no Warutsu" (Japanese: 第八幕 仮初のワルツ)	25 November 2015
As the school prepares for the culture festival, Rem lies to the student council about the location of the grimoire, claiming it is in Vienna. Meanwhile, Lindo and Azuna decide to place Ritsuka under constant protection, with one of them accompanying her wherever she goes. As the festival gets underway, Urie, Mage, and Shiki all ask Ritsuka to be their partner in the dance, but she refuses. When the time for the evening party comes round, she and Rem are chosen as king and queen, and begin to dance despite the misgivings of Lindo and Azuna. As they dance, the two realize that they have feelings for each other. When the party is over, Ritsuka heads home accompanied by Azuna and her brother, until they are ambushed by the vampires. Lindo is forced to transform, but Jek snatches Ritsuka. Azuna attempts to save her, slashing his cheek, and in his rage he impales her. Crying out in anguish, Ritsuka unleashes the power of the grimoire, destroying the surrounding vampires with a flash of light as Azuna dies in her arms. Jek, watching from afar, vows to return and claim her as soon as the light fades.
9	"War Cry of Secrets and Contrariness"; Transliteration: "Dai Kyū-maku Himegoto to Urahara no Wō Kurai" (Japanese: 第九幕 秘め事と裏腹のウォークライ)	2 December 2015
After Azuna's death, Lindo takes Ritsuka to the Exorcist Association for protection. Meanwhile, Urie, Mage and Shiki realise that Ritsuka was the grimoire all along and they start to search for her. The Exorcist Association then betray Lindo's trust, by deciding to kill Ritsuka in order to get rid of the grimoire, but Lindo interferes. They also reveal to Ritsuka that her brother is actually a 'dhamphir'; half-human, half-vampire. Lindo escapes with his sister and they hide in a Japanese shrine. While hiding, Lindo reveals to Ritsuka that they are not siblings; but cousins. His father was a vampire, and his real mother is actually their deceased maternal aunt, Marta. He then confesses to Ristuka that he is in-love with her and attempts to kiss her, only to be interrupted when Rem arrives. Assuming that Rem has come to obtain the grimoire, he and Rem decide to settle their matters once and for all in a battle using their powers. Rem injures Lindo and is about to finish him off until Ritsuka yells at him to stop. She calls him out on his stoic, icy front before yelling that she hates him, despises him and never wants to see him again. Rem leaves heartbroken after Lindo repels him with his magic. Ritsuka then takes Lindo to Shikō Academy's infirmary to treat his wounds and while there she decides to forget her feelings for Rem so she can protect her family. Meanwhile, Jek visits his master, Lord Nesta to inform him that he has found the grimoire.
10	"Tarantella of Desire and Deceit"; Transliteration: "Dai jū-maku yokubō to itsuwari no tarantera" (Japanese: 第十幕 欲望と偽りのタランテラ)	9 December 2015
Urie, Mage and Shiki confront Rem about his feelings for Ritsuka. They also tell him that they too have fallen in-love with her, causing Rem to explode in a jealous rage. Meanwhile, Ritsuka is looking after Lindo at Shikō Academy until she is greeted by Jek who introduces himself and he offers to take her to her mother. Ritsuka is hesitant since he was the one who kidnapped Maria, but Jek convinces her that vampires never tell lies. Jek takes Ritsuka to an abandoned building, revealed to be a hideout where Maria is, but Ritsuka is still cautious of him. As they sit down for tea, Jek reveals to Ritsuka that she is, in fact, the daughter of the Demon King, Lord Maksis, thus making Ritsuka half-devil, half-human. The truth sinks into her and Ritsuka laments how she had made the people around her suffer and get hurt because she's the daughter of Maksis. Jek suddenly tells her that his master, Lord Nesta can remove the grimoire from her, and he leads her down to a tunnel where they take a gondola to a castle shrouded in mist. Meanwhile, at Shikō Academy, Loewen finds Ritsuka's crown from the evening party she had discarded in the fountain.
11	"Samba of Jet and Crimson"; Transliteration: "Dai jū ichi-maku shikkoku to guren no sanba" (Japanese: 第十一幕 漆黒と紅蓮のサンバ)	16 December 2015
Ritsuka arrives at Lord Nesta's castle where she meets Lord Nesta for the first time. He reveals to her more about her family's past then has her taken away to be prepared for the ceremony. At Shikō Academy, the Student Council are wondering where Ritsuka is, until they are confronted by Lindo and Loewen. Loewen reveals to everyone that Ritsuka has gone to Lord Nesta's castle, prompting the devils and Lindo to go and save her. Rem is hesitant until Loewen gives him Ritsuka's crown as an encouragement, to which he declares as the "perfect checkmate", thus finally admitting his feelings for her. Meanwhile, Jek reveals his true colours to Ritsuka when she stubbornly presses him about the ceremony and refusing to comply if he doesn't explain. She is then brought before Lord Nesta whom she tries to attack with a pair of scissors she secretly brought along, but he hypnotises her to comply. While under Lord Nesta's spell, her mind still works and she regrets her decision as she is led to the sacrificial tower. Just before Lord Nesta could bite her, Loewen interferes followed by the other devils and Lindo. Ritsuka happily rushes to them, but Jek grabs her and holds her at knifepoint with the pair of scissors.
12	"Opera Ball of Endings and Beginnings"; Transliteration: "Dai jū ni-maku owari to hajimari no ōpanbaru" (Japanese: 第十二幕 終わりと始まりのオーパンバル)	23 December 2015
While the devils, Lindo and Loewen fight off the vampires, Jek takes Ritsuka back to Lord Nesta in order to continue the ceremony. Lord Nesta tries to bite Ritsuka again, but Loewen interferes allowing Ritsuka to escape and she is saved by Lindo who leaves her in Rem's care. Rem takes Ritsuka to a safe place, and while there, he hugs her, relieved she was safe. Lindo defeats Jek causing him to plummet and get impaled to death on a statue. Lord Nesta suddenly recognises Lindo as his estranged son and hypnotises him in order to make him his ally, but Lindo is quick to snap out of his spell and he stabs his father through the heart with his claws. Lord Nesta falls dead on the ground and the remaining vampires retreat. Ritsuka reunites with Lindo until Lord Nesta suddenly revives and gets up, causing the devils and Loewen to realise that Lord Nesta had hidden his 'real' heart elsewhere to prevent himself from dying. He attacks everyone by sending them flying into the walls, and Rem saves Ritsuka. Having had enough of her current situation, Ritsuka decides that she will protect everyone, and her determination activates the grimoire's powers. With the help of the grimoire, she is able to locate Lord Nesta's real heart which had been hidden in one of the statues, and she stabs it with the pair of scissors, ending Lord Nesta once and for all just as the grimoire's powers fade away. The devils also notice that the grimoire's scent no longer lingers. As they go outside, Rem is finally able to declare his love for Ritsuka which she happily accepts and rekindles. He then tells her with the grimoire gone, he has no need to remain in the human world and he asks her to live with him in the devil world. Ritsuka declines and they go their separate ways. Just before Rem disappears, he gives Ritsuka his crown from the evening party and they share a kiss as he fades away. Life returns to normal in the Tachibana family and Ritsuka wears Rem's crown around her neck at all times signifying her unending love for him with hopes of meeting him again someday. Meanwhile, Loewen opens a pair of large doors revealing a book. The locks on the book unlock itself and the pages fly open until a pair of black pages are shown. The episode ends with Loewen welcoming Lord Maksis back, implying that the story is unfinished.

=== Manga ===
An original manga, written and illustrated by Samako Natsu and titled Dance with Devils -Blight-, began publishing in Square Enix's shōnen magazine GFantasy on 18 September 2015. Rika Nakase will collaborate on the story.

==== Volumes ====
No.	Release date	ISBN
1	26 December 2015	978-4757548534
2	27 June 2016	978-4757550285

=== Stage plays ===
A series of 2.5D musical stage plays began in 2016. The visuals reveals Daiki Ise as Jek, Kōhei Norizuki as Noel, Ryūjirō Izaki as Holland (double-cast with Subaru Kimura). The previously announced cast includes Keisuke Kaminaga as Rem Kaginuki, Jin Hiramaki as Lindo Tachibana, Tsubasa Sakiyama as Urie Sogami, Yū Yoshioka as Mage Nanashiro, Junpei Yasukawa as Shiki Natsumezaka, and Taiki Naitō as Loewen. Kaori Miuchi began to direct the musical and writing the script. The play will have 14 performances between 3–13 March 2016 in Tokyo. The second musical plays were started at 21–27 December 2016 and the third stage plays were started on 15–25 March 2018.

=== Video game ===
Rejet released a Dance with Devils game for PlayStation Vita on 24 March 2016. The theme song, composed by Elements Garden, is performed by Wataru Hatano. A sequel titled Dance with Devils: My Carol was released 22 March 2018. The theme song was also composed by Elements Garden.
