= Diabolik Lovers =

Japanese game franchise

ディアボリックラヴァーズ (Diaborikku Ravāzu)
- Genre: Drama, mystery, romance
- Video game

Diabolik Lovers: Haunted Dark Bridal
- Developer: Rejet
- Publisher: Idea Factory
- Genre: Visual novel
- Platform: PSP; PS Vita (Limited V Edition); PlayStation 4
- Released: JP: October 11, 2012; JP: December 19, 2013 (PS Vita)
- Video game

Diabolik Lovers: More,Blood
- Developer: Rejet
- Publisher: Idea Factory
- Genre: Visual novel
- Platform: PSP; PS Vita / PS TV (Limited V Edition); PlayStation 4
- Released: JP: October 24, 2013; JP: January 15, 2015 (PS Vita)
- Anime television series
- Directed by: Shinobu Tagashira
- Produced by: Mayumi Ichikawa; Yuuko Kon
- Written by: Seiko Nagatsu
- Music by: Yuki Hayashi
- Studio: Zexcs
- Licensed by: NA: Sentai Filmworks; SA/SEA: Muse Communication
- Original network: AT-X
- English network: SEA: Aniplus Asia
- Original run: September 16, 2013 – December 9, 2013
- Episodes: 12 + 1 OVA
- Video game

Diabolik Lovers: Vandead Carnival
- Developer: Rejet
- Publisher: Idea Factory
- Genre: Visual novel
- Platform: PS Vita, PS TV
- Released: JP: December 4, 2014
- Video game

Diabolik Lovers: Dark Fate
- Developer: Rejet
- Publisher: Idea Factory
- Genre: Visual novel
- Platform: PS Vita, PS TV
- Released: JP: February 26, 2015
- Anime television series

Diabolik Lovers: More,Blood
- Directed by: Risako Yoshida
- Produced by: Mayumi Ichikawa; Kumi Totsuka; Kenji Ebato
- Written by: Hiroko Kanasugi
- Music by: Yuki Hayashi; Saki
- Studio: Zexcs
- Licensed by: NA: Sentai Filmworks
- English network: SEA: Aniplus Asia
- Original run: September 23, 2015 – December 9, 2015
- Episodes: 12
- Video game

Diabolik Lovers: Lunatic Parade
- Developer: Rejet
- Publisher: Idea Factory
- Genre: Visual novel
- Platform: PS Vita, PS TV
- Released: JP: February 25, 2016
- Video game

Diabolik Lovers: Lost Eden (paradise)
- Developer: Rejet
- Publisher: Idea Factory
- Genre: Visual novel
- Platform: PS Vita
- Released: JP: February 16, 2017
- Video game

Diabolik Lovers: Chaos Lineage
- Developer: Rejet
- Publisher: Idea Factory
- Genre: Visual novel
- Platform: Nintendo Switch
- Released: JP: March 28, 2019

Diabolik Lovers (Japanese: ディアボリックラヴァーズ, Hepburn: Diaborikku Ravāzu) is a Japanese otome game franchise by Rejet. Its first entry was released in October 2012 for the PlayStation Portable system. The franchise has released seven games with the first two having been remastered for the PlayStation Vita and released as "Limited V Editions". The seventh game was released in March 2019 playable on Nintendo Switch. The franchise has brought forth two 12-episode anime television adaptations by Zexcs, which aired from September to December 2013, and September to December 2015. The first series was followed by an original video animation (OVA), which was included in Diabolik Lovers: Dark Fate in February 2015. It has been made into various manga, anime, drama CDs, music CDs and fanbooks. Three stage plays also ran in August 2015, August 2016, and January 2018.

In February 2020, Rejet announced and launched a new project happening within the same universe as Diabolik Lovers, titled Carnelian Blood (Japanese: カーネリアンブラッド, Hepburn: Kānerian Buraddo) featuring thea 5-man unit called EROSION.

== Gameplay ==
Players take on the role as Yui Komori (小森 ユイ, Komori Yui, – default name), who can choose from a variety of male characters as her love interest. In Diabolik Lovers, every playable character's route is split into three sections: Dark, Maniac and Ecstasy. Each of these three sections is split into a prologue, ten subsections, and an epilogue. There are three possible endings for each character based on her choices.

The games were first brought out on PSP, by the third game they were continued in PS Vita / PS TV format, the first two games were soon also brought out in this format. In 2017 it was announced the first three games would be brought out on PlayStation 4. In 2018, a new game titled Diabolik Lovers: Chaos Lineage was announced and released in March 2019 on the Nintendo Switch.

Thus far seven games have been released:

- Diabolik Lovers: Haunted Dark Bridal
- Diabolik Lovers: More,Blood
- Diabolik Lovers: Vandead Carnival
- Diabolik Lovers: Dark Fate
- Diabolik Lovers: Lunatic Parade
- Diabolik Lovers: Lost Eden
- Diabolik Lovers: Chaos Lineage

== Plot ==
The main heroine, Yui Komori, is just a normal teenage girl in high school until her father, a priest, travels overseas for work. As a result, Yui is sent to a new town and arrives alone at a mansion which will be her new home. Nobody greets her, however, the door swings open on its own accord. Yui finds a handsome young man sleeping with no heartbeat on a couch. To her shock, he awakens, and five other young men gradually appear. Yui discovers that all six of them are brothers, but by three different mothers, and that they were all vampires from the very beginning.

After living with the Sakamakis for a month, Yui starts to have strange dreams and apparitions regarding a mysterious "Eve". One night, on their way to school, (Note: Reitei Academy High School (嶺帝学院高校, Reitei Gakuin Kōkō)) the brothers and Yui get involved in an unexplainable fiery car crash. The next day, four vampire brothers come to the house and kidnap her. What will happen with the Sakamakis? Will she come back?

== Characters ==
Protagonist:
The main character of the game and anime (name is changeable in the games)
Yui Komori (小森 ユイ, Komori Yui)
Voiced by: Rie Suegara (Japanese), Maggie Flecknoe (English)
Yui is the main female protagonist of the Diabolik Lovers series. She is a beautiful, kind, gentle, and clumsy 17-year-old student, who used to live with her father, a priest, who owns his own church. After her father moved overseas for work, she was forced to live in a mansion with six mysterious brothers, who are actually vampires. In the beginning, she was skeptical of their supernatural nature but came to find no other solution. In a struggle for survival, she decides to live with them, while bearing the fear of being attacked by each of them. She is the sacrificial bride legend of the Sakamaki vampires and the chosen "Eve" for Karlheinz's "Adam & Eve" plan. Despite being mistreated by the vampires, Yui always responds to them with kindness and attempts to understand them better. In the first episode of the anime's first season, it is revealed that she is adopted, and hence, begins to investigate her past. She also starts suffering chest pains while living with the Sakamakis, due to the fact that her heart was originally Cordelia's, who was the mother of the triplets named Ayato, Kanato, and Laito. This explains why all of the brothers were highly drawn to her blood.

=== Sakamaki Household ===
The Sakamaki brothers are the sons of Karlheinz, but from three different mothers. The oldest sons, Shū and Reiji, were conceived by Karlheinz's second wife, Beatrix. The triplets, named Ayato, Kanato, and Laito, were born from Karlheinz's first wife, Cordelia. The youngest, Subaru, came from Karlheinz's third wife, Christa. Even though they are brothers, they don't get along with each other, and they seem rather distant due to the way they were brought up.
Shu Sakamaki (逆巻 シュウ, Sakamaki Shū)
Voiced by: Kōsuke Toriumi (Japanese); Ty Mahany (English)
(Child) Voiced by: Kahoru Sasajima (Japanese); Krystal LaPorte (English)
Shu is the eldest son of the Sakamaki family, the current master of the mansion, and the first son of Beatrix. Shū grew up being given too much-unwanted attention from his mother. Due to Cordelia's hostilities towards Beatrix to be Karlheinz's best wife, she put all the pressures on the young Shu. He is one of the brothers who seem to have any prior knowledge of Yui's arrival, mentioning "that person" had contacted him asking to have her stay with them as a guest. According to the students of the school, Shū is the owner of the music room and can always be found sleeping there. Shu needs to use a lot of persuasion in order to get him awake and do something for himself. Shū loves music despite being apathetic and lazy. His only friend was a human boy named Edgar, who died in a fire, set on his village by Reiji. Shu was unable to save him, so he thought that his life was limited from humans. Despite Shū being the eldest, he's never responsible for looking after his brothers and the house. Instead, he mostly pushes these duties onto Reiji.
Reiji Sakamaki (逆巻 レイジ, Sakamaki Reiji)
Voiced by: Katsuyuki Konishi (Japanese); David Wald (English)
(Child) Voiced by: Yuka Nishigaki (Japanese); Nancy Novotny (English)
Reiji is the second son of the Sakamaki family and the second son of Beatrix. He is very formal and is generally the most composed aside from Shū. Although Shū is his only full-blood brother, he despises him for being the supposed favorite of their mother. It was also due to Beatrix neglecting him throughout his childhood because of Cordelia's hostilities. He eventually took his anger out by setting fire to Edgar's village when Shu refused to listen to their mother. When it seemed that Edgar's death wasn't enough to impress his mother and made Shū withdrawn, Reiji took out his anger again by hiring a vampire hunter to assassinate Beatrix. He later regretted this when she died at peace, happy to be freed from Cordelia's harassment and to be able to witness her son's mark of adulthood. He values rules and demands that others follow them, even though many of his decrees are odd and self-made. Reiji chooses to be the role model of the house even though he is the second son. Although Reiji has a very polite attitude and almost always acts like a gentleman, he is a man of very harsh words. Along with his passion for experimenting and making drugged potions, he loves to collect kitchenware.
Ayato Sakamaki (逆巻 アヤト, Sakamaki Ayato)
Voiced by: Hikaru Midorikawa (Japanese); Chris Patton (English)
(Child) Voiced by: Hiroko Ushida (Japanese); Shannon Emerick (English)
Ayato is the third son of the Sakamaki family, the eldest triplet, and the first son of Cordelia. He is the lead male protagonist serving as the storyline's hero. As a child, Ayato was similarly put pressure upon to be the best, just as Shū was. However, unlike Shu, he never received love from his mother. He was abused by her (both physically and verbally) to the point where she attempted to drown him if he was not the best. Therefore, he grew up always having to be the best; causing him to develop a self-centered, arrogant, and overconfident personality. He refers to himself most of the time as "Ore-sama". Due to never receiving any type of love from his mother. He is the first of the Sakamakis to appear at the beginning of the first episode of the anime's first season, as well as the first one to drink Yui's blood. He is also very good at playing basketball, and his favorite food is takoyaki. Prior to the start of the series, Ayato and his triplet brothers killed their mother. He stabbed Cordelia and drank her blood, claiming it to be the best.
Kanato Sakamaki (逆巻 カナト, Sakamaki Kanato)
Voiced by: Yūki Kaji (Japanese); Corey Hartzog (English)
(Child) Voiced by: Kaori Mizuhashi (Japanese); Tiffany Grant (English)
Kanato is the fourth son of the Sakamaki family, the second oldest of the triplets, and the second son of Cordelia. He is usually referred to as the "problem triplet". As a child, he received little attention from his mother. Very often, Cordelia would have sexual encounters with different men right in front of him. Due to being neglected, he often played alone and talked to his dolls, usually to his precious Teddy which he takes with him everywhere. However, there were occasions when his mother would request him to sing for her. She nicknamed him her "little songbird", because of his beautiful voice. Kanato tends to cry often and gets violently angry when he doesn't get his demands. He speaks politely, but is extremely sadistic and tends to display violent outbursts. He is also shown to be abusive. Kanato is also obsessed with the dead to the point where he prefers them to the living. Prior to the start of the series, he and his triplet brothers killed their mother. Kanato burned her body and placed her cremated remains in his Teddy.
Laito Sakamaki (逆巻 ライト, Sakamaki Raito)
Voiced by: Daisuke Hirakawa (Japanese); Blake Shepard (English)
(Child) Voiced by: Yuko Sasamoto (Japanese); Luci Christian (English)
Laito is the fifth son of the Sakamaki family, the youngest triplet, and the third son of Cordelia. He was sexually abused by his mother and began seeing her as a lover rather than a parent. When Karlheinz found out about the unusual relationship between them, he locked him in the basement. Later, Cordelia went to see him and told him that she was now having sexual relations with someone else and had only been using Laito for pleasure. The overall shock and the situation ended up with Laito becoming perverted and not having a clear understanding of love. He is always cheerful and loves to joke but is similar to Ayato when teasing Yui. However, his personality suddenly changes when something goes against his wishes, usually when Yui is too defiant around him. However, Laito has a phobia of insects, specifically spiders. Prior to the start of the series, Laito and his triplet brothers killed their mother. He pushed Cordelia off the balcony after pretending to help her fend off Ayato who had stabbed her and drank her blood earlier on. In terms of manipulation and scheming, he is arguably the worst of all the brothers. Intelligent, quick thinking, and skillful in his lies, he is the only brother that actively attempts to drive the MC insane. Highly dangerous, avoid.
Subaru Sakamaki (逆巻 スバル, Sakamaki Subaru)
Voiced by: Takashi Kondō (Japanese); Jessie James Grelle (English)
Subaru is the sixth and youngest son of the Sakamaki family and the only son of Christa. He is usually alone and never cares about whats happening around him, due to how he was brought up. His mother became mentally unstable after he was born, which made his relationship with her very complicated. Christa kept denouncing him as her son (both physically and verbally), and was constantly pressuring him to kill her, which was something he could not bring himself to do. This caused Subaru to see himself as filthy and unwanted, thus resorting to violence to vent out his anger and frustrations. He even goes as far as to break everything when he is extremely angered. However, Subaru manages to compress this side when he is around Yui, though he is still prone to outbursts. He is a delinquent type who loves to damage things, but there is a tsundere and gentle side of him that only Yui can see. He happens to care about Yui when he encouraged her to escape the mansion while she still had the chance. When Yui chose to stay in order to find the answers to her questions, he reluctantly complied with her decision by giving her his silver knife to protect herself. It is also hinted that Subaru is in love with her, though he denies such a possibility.
Kino (キノ, Kino)
Voiced by: Tomoaki Maeno
Kino is said to be an illegitimate child of Karlheinz. He made his first appearance in the sixth franchise of the series, Diabolik Lovers, Lost Eden. He was abandoned as an infant in a land called "Rothenberg" and was raised by a family of ghouls. However, living among the ghouls was not easy for Kino as he was discriminated against, bullied, and shunned. Everything changed for him one day when his vampire powers were awakened, which made Kino convinced that he was the illegitimate son of Karlheinz. Using his powers, he made the ghouls obey him and he decided to kidnap Yui in order to become Adam with her as Eve.

=== Mukami household ===
The Mukami brothers were new characters who debuted in the second version of the franchise, Diabolik Lovers More, Blood. Unlike the Sakamaki brothers, they are not blood-related to one another. They were originally humans who were later turned into vampires by Karlheinz, who serves as their benefactor. The Mukami brothers made their first anime appearances in the OVA of Diabolik Lovers and they appeared as new characters in the second season of the anime.
Ruki Mukami (無神 ルキ, Mukami Ruki)
Voiced by: Takahiro Sakurai (Japanese); Adam Gibbs (English)
Ruki is the eldest son of the Mukami family and is known as the 'Brains' of the group. When he was still a human, Ruki was the son of an aristocrat. As a child, he was spoiled and arrogant until his family went bankrupt. He became an orphan after his father committed suicide, while his mother ran away with her secret lover. This caused Ruki to distrust people since his mother never came back for him, even when she told him in a letter that she still loves him. Ruki ended up in the orphanage where he was bullied by the other orphans and mistreated by the staff since he was a former aristocrat until he met his brothers, Kou, Yuma, and Azusa. He devised a plan to escape the orphanage which failed when he and his brothers got shot by the orphanage staff, resulting in him getting branded as 'livestock' on the back as punishment. Just as he was dying, he met the Sakamakis' father, Karlheinz, who offered him another chance to live but as a vampire. Ruki immediately accepted the offer, seeing this as an opportunity to get revenge on those who abused him and deprived him of his humanity. As the leader of the Mukami's, Ruki is a cruel manipulator with a cool attitude who is able to keep things under his control and a bit of kuudere which Yui notices. He is often seen carrying a book around with him which is said to be a memento of his father. In the second season of the anime, he is the first of the four brothers to drink Yui's blood. He is also rivals with Ayato and seems to enjoy taunting and provoking him when it comes to Yui.
Kou Mukami (無神 コウ, Mukami Kou)
Voiced by: Ryōhei Kimura (Japanese); Bryson Baugus (English)
Kou is the second son of the Mukami family. When he was still a human, Kou was an orphan who was abandoned in a manhole, thus having no knowledge of his birth parents. His only desire that time was to see the vast blue sky out of his manhole. He ended up in the orphanage where he became a playtoy for the aristocrats due to his beauty. He was abused every day and he forced himself to accept being a playtoy since he was able to have a lot of nice things from the orphanage. This resulted in him losing his right eye, and since his wounds weren't given time to heal, he ended up having scars all over his body. As a result, Kou grew up believing that the world is about 'give-and-take'. He met his brothers, Ruki, Yuma, and Azusa, and attempted to escape the orphanage with them, but was shot by the orphanage staff. He met Karlheinz as he was dying and was offered another chance to live, but as vampires. Kou accepted the offer, seeing this as another chance to see the blue sky. After he was turned into a vampire, Karlheinz gave him a magical prosthetic eye that enables him to see into people's hearts. Due to his childhood trauma, Kou developed a two-faced personality that only surfaces when something doesn't go his way or when Yui is defiant. On top of that, he works as an idol in the present human world which gives him the advantage of using his beautiful and pristine features to deceive his fans and others. He is also rivals with Subaru and seems to enjoy provoking him when it comes to Yui.
Yuma Mukami (無神 ユーマ, Mukami Yuuma) / Edgar (エドガー, Edogā)
Voiced by: Tatsuhisa Suzuki (Japanese); Andrew Love (English)
Yuma is the third son of the Mukami family and is the tallest out of his brothers. He is actually Edgar, Shū's only human childhood friend whom Shū thought had perished in a fire. Yuma, then Edgar had actually survived the fire due to unknown circumstances but had lost all his memories of his past and who he was, resulting in him suffering from amnesia. He later joined a street gang and went under the name 'Bear'. In order to survive on the streets, he had to abandon his timidness and innocent traits; becoming, rough, violent, aggressive, rebellious, and dominating over time. The rest of his gang got killed during a coup d'etat and by unfortunate luck, he was the only survivor. He ended up in the orphanage where he met his brothers, Ruki, Kou, and Azusa, and attempted to escape with them, but was shot by the orphanage staff. He met Karlheinz as he was dying and was offered another chance to live, but as vampire. He accepted the offer, seeing this as another chance to fulfill his gang boss's dream; to get rid of the aristocrats and have a world where there are no social classes. Karlheinz renamed him "Yuma" after he was turned into a vampire. Whenever Yuma gets angry, he normally goes on rampages. He is a delinquent type with a passion for vegetable gardening and a bit of a tsundere which Yui notices. Shū recognizes Yuma as Edgar but refuses to believe it at first, thinking it's only his imagination. Reiji however, realizes that Yuma is actually Edgar sometime after Shū.
Azusa Mukami (無神 アズサ, Mukami Azusa)
Voiced by: Daisuke Kishio (Japanese); Greg Ayres (English)
Azusa is the fourth and youngest son of the Mukami family. When he was still a human, Azusa was an orphan who had no knowledge of his birth parents. He also doubted his existence and believed that his life had no meaning until he was picked up by three thieving children named; Justin, Melissa, and Christina, who would constantly beat him up for any ridiculous reason. However, the more Azusa was beaten up, he began to enjoy it and started seeing pain as his meaning of existence, believing that being able to feel pain would confirm that you're alive. This continued until Justin, Melissa and Christina were killed when they attempted to rob an aristocrat. Azusa started constantly cutting himself after their deaths and named three prominent cuts on his arm to immortalize them. He soon ended up in the orphanage where he became a punching bag for the other orphans until he met his brothers, Ruki, Kou, and Yuma. When Ruki devised a plan to escape from the orphanage, Azusa was hesitant until Ruki punched him. He agreed to go along with the escape plan and was shot by the orphanage staff. Karlheinz appeared before him as he was dying and offered him another chance to live, but as vampires. Azusa accepted the offer in order to feel pain again and was considered a pitiful human before being turned into a vampire. He is the only one out of the Mukami's who seems to treat Yui decently. Alongside his passion for knife collecting, the way he speaks is quite timid and he is a bit of a yandere. He is also rivals with Kanato and seems to enjoy provoking him.

=== Tsukinami household ===
The Tsukinami brothers were new characters who were introduced in the fourth game of the franchise, Diabolik Lovers, Dark Fate. They are the original founders of the vampires. They made their first anime appearances in the OVA of Diabolik Lovers and they made brief appearances in the second season of the anime.
Carla Tsukinami (月浪 カルラ, Tsukinami Karura)
Voiced by: Toshiyuki Morikawa (Japanese); Josh Morrison (English)
Carla is the First Blood King. He is also the elder brother of the founding vampires, possessing both intelligence and reason. However, he hides secret sadistic violence underneath that. Within his long lifespan, he has a lazy and calm character. Alongside his younger brother Shin, Carla is one of the last two remaining members of the founders' bloodline. As a founder, he has the ability to transform into a wolf, snake, bat, and eagle. He, however, never uses those forms, because he possesses the highest level of magic which makes him extremely powerful. And if he was not sick from the Endzeit, he probably would have been more powerful than Karlheinz.
Shin Tsukinami (月浪 シン, Tsukinami Shin)
Voiced by: Showtaro Morikubo (Japanese); Houston Hayes (English)
Shin is the younger brother of Carla. He possesses a high pride due to being a founder, he looks down upon vampires of other bloodlines. Beautiful blood is his preference and often utters narcissistic remarks. Ordinarily, his words are polite, but when he loses his temper his speech will become violent and often contain hurtful or insensitive words. Alongside his older brother Carla, Shin is one of the last two remaining members of the founders' bloodline. He has the ability to transform into a wolf, snake, bat, and eagle. However, he prefers using his wolf form. He has high strength, speed, and regenerative abilities. He is able to wield a sword as well.

=== Other characters ===
Tougo Sakamaki (逆巻 透吾, Sakamaki Tōgo) / Karlheinz (カールハインツ, Kāruhaintsu)
Voiced by: Masataka Sawada (Japanese); John Swasey (English)
Karlheinz is the father of the Sakamaki brothers, as well as the benefactor to the Mukami brothers. He is also the husband of Cordelia, Beatrix, and Christa. In the human world, he shapeshifts into Tougo Sakamaki, a famous politician. In Diabolik Lovers More, Blood, he shapeshifts into school doctor, Reinhart, in order to keep an eye on his sons, Yui, and the Mukami's as well as to observe his plan known as "Adam & Eve".
Richter (リヒター, Rihitā)
Voiced by: Jun Konno (Japanese); David Matranga (English)
Richter is the younger brother of Karlheinz thus making him the uncle of the six Sakamaki brothers. Cordelia began having an affair with him, and it is said that both he and Karlheinz fought over her once, but Karlheinz ended up winning her heart. In the anime, when Cordelia lay dying (after Laito pushed her off the balcony and before Kanato found her), she requested Richter to take out her heart and have it implanted into another vessel. Richter had the heart implanted into Yui when she was still an infant, and he handed her over to Seiji Komori who raised her as his daughter since then. He later returns to the Sakamaki mansion and he starts watching Yui from the shadows in order to observe the 'awakening'. However, it is later revealed that Richter never loved Cordelia from the very beginning, and was only using her as a tool in order to become the next head of the Sakamaki family. As the 'awakening' is happening, he tries to resurrect Cordelia in Yui's body but fails when he is fatally stabbed by Ayato and is finally killed by Laito at the end of the anime's first season.
Cordelia (コーデリア, Kōderia)
Voiced by: Akane Tomonaga (Japanese); Monica Rial (English)
Cordelia was the daughter of a Demon Lord and is Karlheinz's first wife. She is also the mother of the triplets: Ayato, Kanato, and Laito. Prior to the start of the series, she was killed by her sons but Richter removed her heart and had it implanted into Yui, so she would be able to resurrect in a different body. Cordelia also despises Karlheinz's second wife, Beatrix, since she was the first to conceive children instead of her. She tried to make her sons look better than Beatrix's by pushing her oldest triplet Ayato to always be the best in an unloving way. When the 'awakening' occurs, she possesses Yui and attempts to annihilate the Sakamaki brothers with Richter's help. This backfires when Richter reveals that he never loved her from the very beginning. In the final episode of the anime's first season, Cordelia is finally destroyed and permanently removed from Yui's body.
Beatrix (ベアトリクス, Beatorikusu)
Voiced by: Mana Hirata (Japanese); Luci Christian (English)
Beatrix is Karlheinz's second wife and the mother of Shū and Reiji. Not much is said about her marriage to Karlheinz, but even though she was his second wife, she conceived before Cordelia making Shū and Reiji the oldest sons. Cordelia despised her because of that and constantly tormented her. This caused Beatrix to end up focusing all her attention on her first-born, Shū, in order to groom him into Karlheinz's heir, while unintentionally neglecting her second-born, Reiji. In reality, Beatrix truly loved both her sons and cared for them sincerely, but she found it difficult to express those feelings due to her serious and awkward personality. Prior to the start of the series, she was killed by a vampire hunter whom Reiji hired, but Beatrix died at peace; happy to be freed from Cordelia's harassments and her regrets of how she had raised her sons.
Christa (クリスタ, Kurisuta)
Voiced by: Yuki Tashiro (Japanese); Brittney Karbowski (English)
Christa is Karlheinz's third wife and the mother of Subaru. Before she met Karlheinz, she was known as the "White Rose" by all vampires because of her beauty and kindness. Karlheinz married her leading to Subaru's birth. Christa became mentally unstable when she discovered Karlheinz saw her merely as another experiment. She even became delusional to the point where she would sometimes mistake her own son for her husband. Subaru was convinced that it was his fault for being conceived and he was constantly pressured by his mother to kill her with a silver knife that can annihilate vampires.
Seiji Komori (小森 セイジ, Komori Seiji)
Seiji is Yui's priest father who runs his own church. Not much is said about him, but prior to the start of the series, he suddenly had to go overseas for work and he left his daughter in the care of the Sakamakis. In the anime, Yui finds out that he is not her real father after discovering his diary. He is later revealed to be a vampire hunter whom Reiji once hired to assassinate his mother, Beatrix.
Justin, Melissa and Christina (ジャスティン、メリッサ、クリスティーナ, Jasutin, Merissa, Kurisutīna)
A group of thieving children whom Azusa was previously with before he met his brothers, and before he became a vampire. They constantly bullied Azusa, and their abusiveness towards him was the cause of his masochistic mindset. Even though Azusa knew that they had treated him horribly, he still considered them his 'family' since they had saved him from dying on the streets. He was deeply saddened by their deaths after they were killed for attempting to rob an aristocrat. This also caused him to develop his self-harming habit, by slicing himself and naming three prominent wounds on his arm to immortalize his bullies.
Lucks (ルクス, Rukusu)
He was the leader of a street gang Yuma joined before he met his brothers, and before he became a vampire. Yuma looked up to Lucks who scavenged, stole or worked hard in order to provide for himself and his gang. He also shared with Yuma his dream to get rid of the aristocrats and live in a world where there are no social classes. Yuma was traumatized when Lucks and his gang were all killed during a coup d'état, leaving him as the sole survivor.

== Games ==
=== Diabolik Lovers: Haunted Dark Bridal ===
The game was announced and began development in February 2012. The game was released on October 11, 2012 for the PlayStation Portable. It was released on the PlayStation Vita under the title Diabolik Lovers: Haunted Dark Bridal Limited V Edition on December 19, 2013.

=== Diabolik Lovers: More,Blood ===
Following the success of Haunted Dark Bridal, an event titled Rejet Fes 2013 VIVA LA REVOLUTION, was held where the anime adaptation and a new game, titled DIABOLIK LOVERS MORE, BLOOD, were announced. The game was released on October 24, 2013 for the PlayStation Portable. It was released for the title DIABOLIK LOVERS MORE, BLOOD LIMITED V EDITION on January 15, 2015.

=== Diabolik Lovers: Grand Edition ===
Diabolik Lovers: Grand Edition is a compilation game of Haunted Dark Bridal and More,Blood, it was announced at the Otomate Party 2017. The game served as a port of both game to the PlayStation 4. A promotional video for the game was released on January 12, 2018. The game was released on March 29, 2018 for the PS4. The game was released for the Nintendo Switch on November 21, 2019.

=== Diabolik Lovers: Vandead Carnival ===
The game was announced in June 2014 via Dengeki Girl's Style July issue. The game was released on November 4, 2014 for the PlayStation Vita.

=== Diabolik Lovers: Dark Fate ===
The game was announced in March 2014, at Otomate's new lineup for 2014. The game was released on February 26, 2015 for the PlayStation Vita. The Tsukinami brothers were introduced in Dark Fate.

=== Diabolik Lovers: Lunatic Parade ===
The game was announced in April 2015, the game's website was opened on November 4, 2015. The opening video and a promotional video were released on January 19, 2016. The release date was announced in November 2015, the game was released on February 25, 2016. This time, the game included mini-games such as shooting or juggling in between playthroughs, a Nursing Short Story (看病ショートストーリー, Kanbyō shōtosutōrī) was also included with the selected love interest, as well as sub-scenarios involving dates with the selected love interest, Date with SAKAMAKI (going on dates with the Sakamaki's), Date with MUKAMI (which involves camping), and Date with TSUKINAMI (which involves helping prepare a party).

=== Diabolik Lovers: Lost Eden ===
The game was announced in February 2016 during the "Rejet Shinsaku Happyōkai 2016 CHANGE" event as a direct sequel to Dark Fate, it officially introduced Kino, the illegitimate son of Karlheinz. A promotional video was released in December 2016. The release date was announced in B's-Log magazine, and the game was released on February 16, 2017 for the PlayStation Vita.

=== Diabolik Lovers: Chaos Lineage ===
The game was announced in September at the Otomate Party 2018. The release date was announced in March after the official website was set up. The opening was released on December 24. On January 7, 2019, a promotional video for the game was released. The game was released on March 28, 2019. In the game, the characters are divided into three houses, Scarlet, Violet, and Orange. On June 27, an updated version of the game was released in order to fix bugs.

=== Diabolik Lovers: Lunatic Fate Grand Edition ===
During Rejet ShowCase 2025 (which took place on April 26, 2025), it was announced that Dark Fate and Lunatic Parade would be ported to Nintendo Switch. The game was announced on November 20, 2025 as the 11th title in the Otomate Graffiti series, Diabolik Lovers: Lunatic Fate Grand Edition combines Lunatic Parade and Dark Fate into one game, serving as a port of both games for the Nintendo Switch. A promotional video featuring the characters and setting was released on December 24, 2025. The game was released on March 26, 2026 for the Nintendo Switch.

== Anime ==
An anime adaptation was first announced at a 2013 event called the "Rejet Fes 2013 Viva La Revolution". During the "Otomate Party 2013" event later that year, it was announced that the adaptation would be directed by Atsushi Matsumoto and produced by the Zexcs studio. It later premiered on AT-X between September 16 and December 9, 2013. The adaptation features three pieces of theme music. The opening theme is "Mr.SADISTIC NIGHT" performed by Hikaru Midorikawa and Kōsuke Toriumi. The ending theme is "Nightmare" performed by Yuki Hayashi. The second opening is "Kindan no 666" performed by Ryōhei Kimura and Daisuke Kishio. The DVD contained several mini dramas depicting events that occurred to the Sakamakis off-screen during the anime. An original video animation (OVA) episode was bundled together with the Diabolik Lovers: Dark Fate game and released on February 28, 2015. The Blu-ray edition of the series was released in 2015. Myah Eketone was the composer for most of the first two seasons of the anime, with most prominent work being "Floating Pain".

A second anime adaptation titled Diabolik Lovers More, Blood was directed by Risako Yoshida and written by Hiroko Kusanagi with a returning voice cast. The series comprised 12 episodes and aired from September 23 to December 3, 2015. The Blu-ray DVD edition of the second series was released on January 4, 2017, and the Diabolik Lovers II: More, Blood Complete Collection was released on DVD and Blu-ray on March 28, 2017. The second season was also licensed by Sentai Filmworks and received an English dub in March 2017.

Crunchyroll streamed the series. It was subsequently licensed by Sentai Filmworks and was released with an English dub and subtitles by the company on a 2-disc DVD volume set on December 2, 2014. After the acquisition of Crunchyroll by Sony Pictures Television, the owner of Funimation, Diabolik Lovers, among several Sentai Filmworks titles, was dropped from the Crunchyroll streaming service on March 31, 2022.

== Stage plays ==
A Diabolik Lovers stage play based on the first series of the anime ran in Rikkokai Theatre in Tokyo's Shinagawa ward from August 26 to August 30, 2015. It featured Japanese actors Taiki Yamazaki (Ayato), Shohei Hashimoto (Kanato), Katsuhiko Ibuka (Laito), Yūya Asato (Shu), Shungo Takasaki (Reiji), Kazumi Doi (Subaru), Ayumi Takamura (Yui), Yu Amemiya (Cordelia) and Takuma Obonro (Richter). The stage play received largely positive reviews and was released on DVD on February 24, 2016. Guiya Ōta, the writer of the Amnesia musical script, wrote the script and Yūsei Naruse, the Hetalia~Singin' in the World~ musical's script writer, was the producer of the play.

A second Diabolik Lovers stage play titled Diabolik Lovers~re:requiem~ ran in the Shinagawa Prince Hotel's Club eX event hall in Tokyo from August 24 to August 28, 2016. The cast from the original play returned with the exception of Shōhei Hashimoto (Kanato) who was replaced by Kaiki Ōhara and Takuma Obonro (Ritcher) who was replaced by Wataru Shiokawa. Guiya Ōta returned as the scriptwriter and Yūsei Naruse returned to produce the play at Office Inveider. The stage play received largely positive reviews and was released on DVD on December 21, 2016.

A third Diabolik Lovers stage play titled Diabolik Lovers: More, Blood will run at clubeX in Shinagawa, Japan from January 24 to January 28, 2018. The cast largely changed from that of the previous play casting Kazuhara Ara (Ayato), Yūsaku Satō (Kanato), Aren Kohatsu (Shu), Shin'ichi Wagō (Reiji), and Gaku Takamoto (Subaru). Only Katsuhiko Ibuka (Laito) and Ayumi Takamune (Yui) returned as their original characters. Guiya Ōta returned as the scriptwriter and Yūsei Naruse returned to produce the play. The stage play received largely positive reviews and was released on DVD on April 25, 2018.

== Puzzle Event ==
From December 26, 2018, to April 7, 2019, a collaboration event titled DIABOLIK LOVERS ZERO in Nazotomo Café: The Forgotten Art Museum (DIABOLIK LOVERS ZERO in なぞともカフェ 忘却の美術館, DIABOLIK LOVERS ZERO in Nazotomo Kafe: Bōkyaku no Bijutsukan) was held at all Nazotomo Café locations operated by Bandai Namco Amusement (Shinjuku, Shibuya, Kyoto Shinkyogoku, Namba Parks, and Nagoya Sakae) as part of a puzzle rally.

== Drama CD ==
Title	Release Date	Catalog Number	Oricon First Week Rank
DIABOLIK LOVERS Blood & LoveSweet	August 10, 2012	REC-024	None
DIABOLIK LOVERS DARK FATE Vol.1 Chapter of Eclipse (DIABOLIK LOVERS DARK FATE Vol.1 蝕の章, DIABOLIK LOVERS DARK FATE Vol.1 Shoku no Shō)	August 20, 2014	REC-127	36th
DIABOLIK LOVERS DARK FATE Vol.2 Chapter of Waxing Moon (DIABOLIK LOVERS DARK FATE Vol.2 上弦の章, DIABOLIK LOVERS DARK FATE Vol.2 Jōgen no Shō)	September 17, 2014	REC-128	38th
DIABOLIK LOVERS DARK FATE Vol.3 Chapter of Waning Moon (DIABOLIK LOVERS DARK FATE Vol.3 下弦の章, DIABOLIK LOVERS DARK FATE Vol.3 Kagen no Shō)	October 15, 2014	REC-129	20th
DIABOLIK LOVERS LOST EDEN Vol.1 Sakamaki Volume (DIABOLIK LOVERS LOST EDEN Vol.1 逆巻編, DIABOLIK LOVERS LOST EDEN Vol.1 Sakamaki-hen)	August 17, 2016	REC-443	43rd
DIABOLIK LOVERS LOST EDEN Vol.2 Kino Volume (DIABOLIK LOVERS LOST EDEN Vol.2 キノ編, DIABOLIK LOVERS LOST EDEN Vol.2 Kino-hen)	September 21, 2016	REC-444	45th
DIABOLIK LOVERS LOST EDEN Vol.3 Tsukinami Volume (DIABOLIK LOVERS LOST EDEN Vol.3 月浪編, DIABOLIK LOVERS LOST EDEN Vol.3 Tsukinami-hen)	October 19, 2016	REC-445	79th
DIABOLIK LOVERS LOST EDEN Vol.4 Mukami Volume (DIABOLIK LOVERS LOST EDEN Vol.4 無神編, DIABOLIK LOVERS LOST EDEN Vol.4 Mukami-hen)	November 16, 2016	REC-446	69th
DIABOLIK LOVERS CHAOS LINEAGE Vol.1 SCARLET	July 26, 2017	REC-652	49th
DIABOLIK LOVERS CHAOS LINEAGE Vol.2 VIOLET	August 23, 2017	REC-653	42nd
DIABOLIK LOVERS CHAOS LINEAGE Vol.3 ORANGE	September 27, 2017	REC-654	66th
DIABOLIK LOVERS HOUSE OF VAMPIRE	TBD		
