= Takashi Kondō =

Japanese voice actor

- 近藤 隆
- Born: May 12, 1979 (age 47); Okazaki, Aichi, Japan
- Occupation: Voice actor
- Height: 163 cm (64 in)

Takashi Kondō (近藤 隆, Kondō Takashi) (born May 12, 1979) is a Japanese voice actor represented by Amber Note. He voiced Terry Bogard in Fatal Fury, and Faust and Potemkin in Guilty Gear.

== Filmography ==
=== Anime series ===
Year	Title	Role	Notes
2001	Beyblade	Miguel	
2001	Captain Tsubasa	Pepe	2001 version
2001	The Prince of Tennis	Shiratama	
2003	Inuyasha	Kisuke	Episode 129
2003	Dear Boys	Tōya Takashina	
2003	Scrapped Princess	Leopold Scorpus	
2004	Initial D: Fourth Stage	Saiyu	
2005	Black Cat	Train Heartnet	
2005	Glass Mask	Hasegawa	Episodes 19–22
2005	Ichigo 100%	Okusa	
2006	Chocotto Sister	Awara	Episode 3
2006	Himawari!	Yonezawa	
2006	Katekyo Hitman Reborn!	Kyoya Hibari Fon, Alaudi	
2006	Red Garden	JC	
2006	Spider Riders	Shadow	
2007	Bleach	Di Roy Linker	
2007	Gurren Lagann	Kidd	
2007	Heroic Age	Iolaus Oz Nahilm	
2007	Shining Tears X Wind	Killrain	
2008	Slap-up Party: Arad Senki	Baron Abel	
2008	Tytania	Ariabart Tytania	
2008	Zettai Karen Children	Bullet	
2009	Naruto: Shippuden	Suigetsu Hozuki, Shin, Urushi	
2009	Student Council's Discretion	Ken Sugisaki	
2009	Bleach	Findor Carias	
2010	Fairy Tail	Hibiki Lates	
2010	Ichiban Ushiro no Dai Maō	Akuto Sai	
2011	Croisée in a Foreign Labyrinth	Claude Claudel	
2011	Pretty Rhythm Aurora Dream	Sho	
2011	Sekai-ichi Hatsukoi	Ritsu Onodera	
2011	Sekai-ichi Hatsukoi 2	Ritsu Onodera	
2012	Pretty Rhythm: Dear My Future	Sho	
2013	Diabolik Lovers	Sakamaki Subaru	
2013	Hetalia Beautiful World	Protagonist	Episode 5
2013	Leviathan The Last Defense	Leviathan's brother	
2013	My Youth Romantic Comedy Is Wrong, as I Expected	Hayato Hayama	
2013	Ace of Diamond	Nagao Akira	
2014	Lady Jewelpet	Prince Romeo	
2014	The Kawai Complex Guide to Manors and Hostel Behavior	Kurokawa	
2014	Fairy Tail	Hibiki Lates	
2015	My Teen Romantic Comedy SNAFU Too!	Hayato Hayama	
2015	Dance with Devils	Sogami Urie	
2015	Diabolik Lovers More, Blood	Sakamaki Subaru	
2016	Ooya-san wa Shishunki!	Maeda	
2016	91 Days	Avilio Bruno	
2016	Naruto Shippuden	Indra Otsutsuki	
2016	Scared Rider Xechs	Yuji Tsuga	
2016	Tsukiuta. The Animation	Yoru Nagatsuki	
2016	Touken Ranbu: Hanamaru	Kogitsunemaru	
2017	Kirakira PreCure a la Mode	Grocery Shop Owner	
2017	ēlDLIVE	Ken Mizoguchi	
2017	Kenka Bancho Otome: Girl Beats Boys	Haruo Sakaguchi	
2017	Katsugeki/Touken Ranbu	Kogitsunemaru	
2018	Touken Ranbu: Hanamaru 2	Kogitsunemaru	
2019	Ao-chan Can't Study!	Sōichirō Yabe	
2019	Kengan Ashura	Mitsuyo Kureishi	
2020	ID - Invaded	Shiratake	
2020	Tsukiuta. The Animation 2	Yoru Nagatsuki	
2020	My Teen Romantic Comedy SNAFU Climax	Hayato Hayama	
2021	I-Chu: Halfway Through the Idol	Mutsuki Kururugi	
2021	Dragon Goes House-Hunting	Huey	
2021	Backflip!!	Keisuke Tsukidate	
2021	IDOLiSH7: Third Beat!	Mido Torao	
2022	Trapped in a Dating Sim: The World of Otome Games is Tough for Mobs	Dan Fia Elgar	
2023	Junji Ito Maniac: Japanese Tales of the Macabre	Shimada (Headless statue)	
2025	Promise of Wizard	Oz	
2025	Pass the Monster Meat, Milady!	Kauss Laforg	
2026	Journal with Witch	Kazunari Tōno	

=== Anime films ===
Year	Title	Role	Notes
2006	Bleach: Memories of Nobody	Mue	
2008	Gurren Lagann The Movie: Childhood's End	Kidd	
2011	Legend of the Millennium Dragon	Raiko	
2014	Sekai-ichi Hatsukoi: Yokozawa Takafumi no Baai	Ritsu Onodera	
2017	Dance with Devils: Fortuna	Urie Sogami	
2022	Mobile Suit Gundam: Cucuruz Doan's Island	Job John	
2022	Backflip!!	Keisuke Tsukidate	

=== Original net animation ===
Year	Title	Role	Notes
2017-18	The King of Fighters: Destiny	Terry Bogard	

=== Video games ===
Year	Title	Role	Notes
2000	Guilty Gear X	Faust, Potemkin	
2002	Guilty Gear X2	Faust, Potemkin	
2004	Inuyasha: The Secret of the Cursed Mask	Michiru Kururugi	
2006	Dawn of Mana	Stroud Lorimar	
2007	Record of Agarest War	Leonhardt, Rex	
2007	Galaxy Angel II Mugen Kairou no Kagi	Roselle Mateus	
2008	Castlevania Judgment	Ralph Belmondo	
2008	Katekyo Hitman Reborn! Battle Arena	Hibari Kyoya	
2008	Super Robot Wars Z	Toby Watson	
2009	Sacred Blaze	Alecseed	
2009	Trinity Universe	Suzaku	
2009	Galaxy Angel II Eigou Kaiki no Toki	Roselle Mateus	
2009	Starry Sky in Summer	Shiratori Yahiko	
2011	Garnet Cradle	Teshigawara Touya	
2011	Omerta Chinmoku no Okite	Kiryuu Reiji	
2011	Suto*Mani: Strobe*Mania	Masamune Kiryu	
2011	S.Y.K	Suoh/RanFan	
2011	Aiyoku no Eustia	Caim Astraea	
2012	Diabolik Lovers	Sakamaki Subaru	
2012	Tales of Xillia 2	Ludger Will Kresnik, Victor	
2013	Skullgirls	Samson	
2013	Fairy Fencer F: Refrain Chord	All	
2013	Naruto Shippūden: Narutimate Accel 3	Suigetsu Hozuki	
2014	Under Night In-Birth: Exe Late	Carmine	
2014	Granblue Fantasy	Nehan	
2015	Idolish7	Mido Torao	
2015	I-Chu	Mutsuki Kururugi	
2015	Liar! Uncover The Truth	Itaru Yuikawa	
2015	Touken Ranbu	Kogitsunemaru	
2015	Hakuoki: Kyoto Winds	Miki Saburo	
2015	Guilty Gear Sign	Faust, Potemkin	
2016	Guilty Gear Xrd Revelator	Faust, Potemkin	
2016	Hakuoki: Edo Blossoms	Miki Saburo	
2016	The King of Fighters XIV	Terry Bogard	
2017	Sonic Forces	Infinite	
2017	Tsukino Paradise	Yoru Nagatsuki	
2018	BlazBlue: Cross Tag Battle	Carmine	
2018	Fighting EX Layer	Terry Bogard	
2018	Super Smash Bros. Ultimate	Terry Bogard	
2018	The King of Fighters All Star	Terry Bogard	
2019	The King of Fighters for Girls	Terry Bogard	
2019	Promise of Wizard	Oz	
2019	Blackstar: Theater Starless	Kokuyou	
2020	Genshin Impact	Ororon	
2020	Helios Rising Heroes	Will Sprout	
2020	Arknights	Executor	
2021	Guilty Gear Strive	Faust, Potemkin	
2022	Bravely Default: Brilliant Lights	Rufus	
2022	The King of Fighters XV	Terry Bogard	
2023	Street Fighter 6	Terry Bogard	
2025	Fatal Fury: City of the Wolves	Terry Bogard	

=== Drama CDs ===
Year	Title	Role	Notes
2005	Dateless Love	Yoshinobu 'Keiki' Tokugawa	
2006	Boku no Koi no Hanashi Himegoto	Kazui Umehara	
2008	Otona Keikenchi	Shinkai Seiji	
2008	Sekai-ichi Hatsukoi	Onodera Ritsu	
2008	Sentimental Garden Lover	Fuji	
2008	Touch Me Again	Eisuke	
2009	Hanakage	Kirishima Iori	
2009	Beauty & Ghost	Kota Sakaki	
2009	Crimson Spell	Valdrigr (Val) Areswies	
2010	Leopard Hakusho	Aya Hyoudou	
2010	Thanatos no Futago	Mihail Aramovich Khromushin	
2010	Twinkle Stars	Chihiro Aoi	
2011	Candy Color Paradox	Satoshi Onoe	
2011	Hana Wa Saku Ka	Minagawa Youichi	
2011	Koi no Shizuku	Maya Shibasaki	
2012	Diabolik Lovers	Subaru Sakamaki	
2012	Flutter	Ryousuke Mizuki	
2013	Seventh Heaven	Yuuri	
2013	Alice=Alice	Kuro Usagi	
2013	Kuroneko Kareshi no Asobikata	Shingo	
2014	Oz to Himitsu no Ai	Chikage	
2018	Mo Dao Zu Shi/Ma Dou So Shi	Xue Yang/Setsu You	

=== Dubbing ===
==== Live-action ====
Original Year	Title	Role	Original actor	Notes
2001	The 51st State	Omar	Ade	
2002	Live from Baghdad	Eason Jordan	Clark Gregg	
2004	The Libertine	Billy Downs	Rupert Friend	
2005–2006	Project Runway	Daniel Vosovic		
2006	Pray for Morning	Dylan	Dennis Flanagan	
2006	Flags of Our Fathers	Ed Block	Benjamin Walker	
2006	Bon Cop, Bad Cop	Jonathan	Erik Knudsen	
2006–2010	Ugly Betty	Marc St. James	Michael Urie	
2006–2010	Heroes	Narrator/Mohinder Suresh	Sendhil Ramamurthy	
2006–2012	Eureka	Douglas Fargo	Neil Grayston	
2007	Shooter	Dave Simmons	Mackenzie Gray	
2007–2014	Bones	Lance Sweets	John Francis Daley	
2008	Uncertainty	Bobby	Joseph Gordon-Levitt	
2008–2014	True Blood	Eric Northman	Alexander Skarsgård	
2011	Final Destination 5	Peter Friedkin	Miles Fisher	
2011	Pan Am	Dean Lowrey	Mike Vogel	
2014	Veronica Mars	Eli "Weevil" Navarro	Francis Capra	
2016	Their Finest	Tom Buckley	Sam Claflin	
2017	Dunkirk	Collins	Jack Lowden	
2018	Love, Simon	Simon Spier	Nick Robinson	
2018	Rampage	Connor	Jack Quaid	
2019	The Kill Team	Sergeant Deeks	Alexander Skarsgård	
