= Konrad Koch =

German teacher and football pioneer

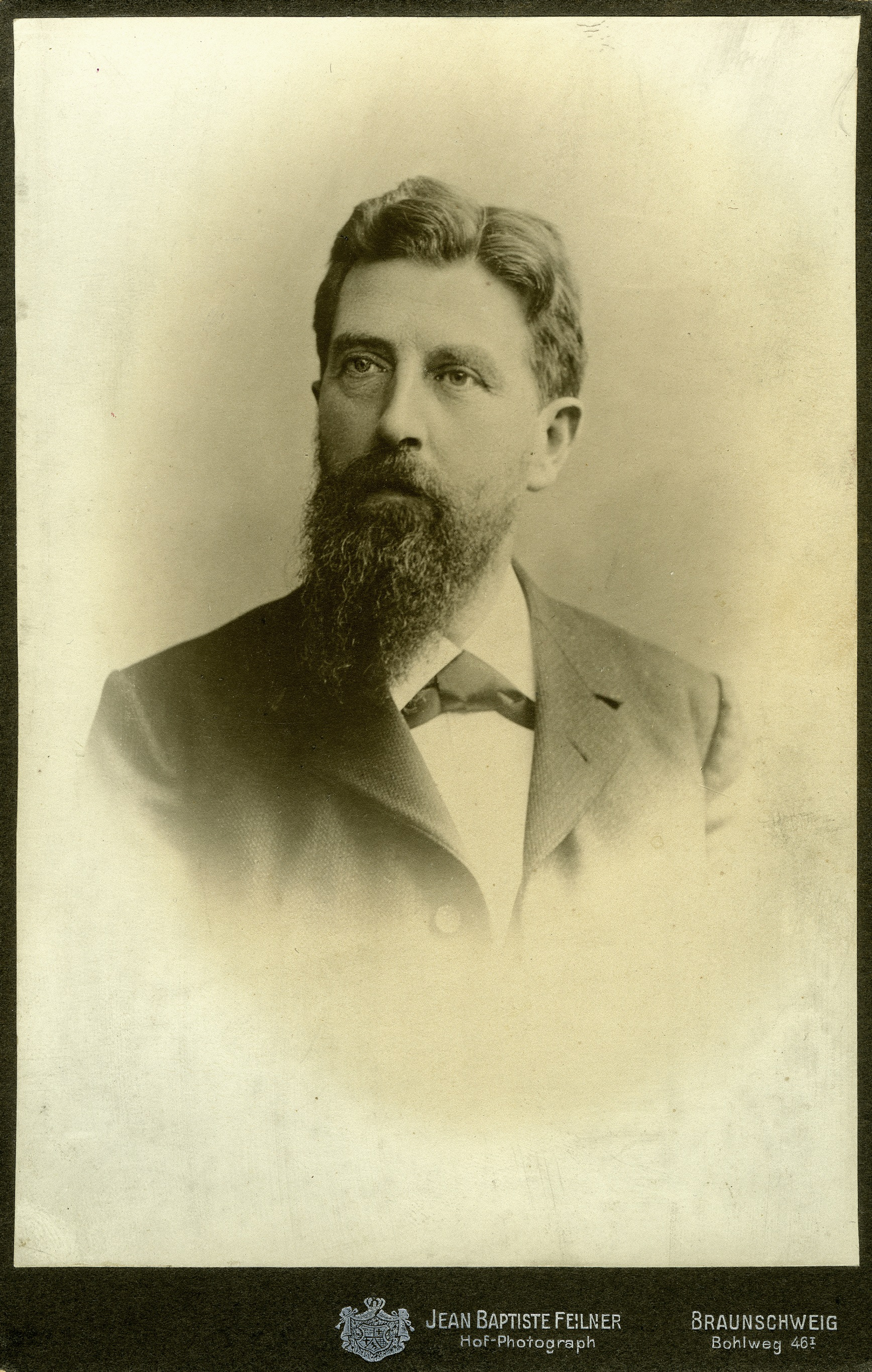
- Born: Wilhelm Carl Johann Conrad Koch; 13 February 1846; Braunschweig, Duchy of Brunswick
- Died: 13 April 1911 (aged 65); Braunschweig, German Empire
- Occupation: Teacher

Wilhelm Carl Johann Conrad Koch, commonly known as Konrad Koch (13 February 1846 – 13 April 1911) was a German teacher and football pioneer.

== Early life and career ==
Koch was born on 13 February 1846 in Braunschweig, Duchy of Brunswick. After finishing secondary school in Braunschweig, he studied theology and philology at the universities of Göttingen, Berlin, and Leipzig.

He returned to Braunschweig in 1868 to become a teacher for Ancient Greek, Latin, history, and geography at the prestigious Martino-Katharineum secondary school.

== Football ==
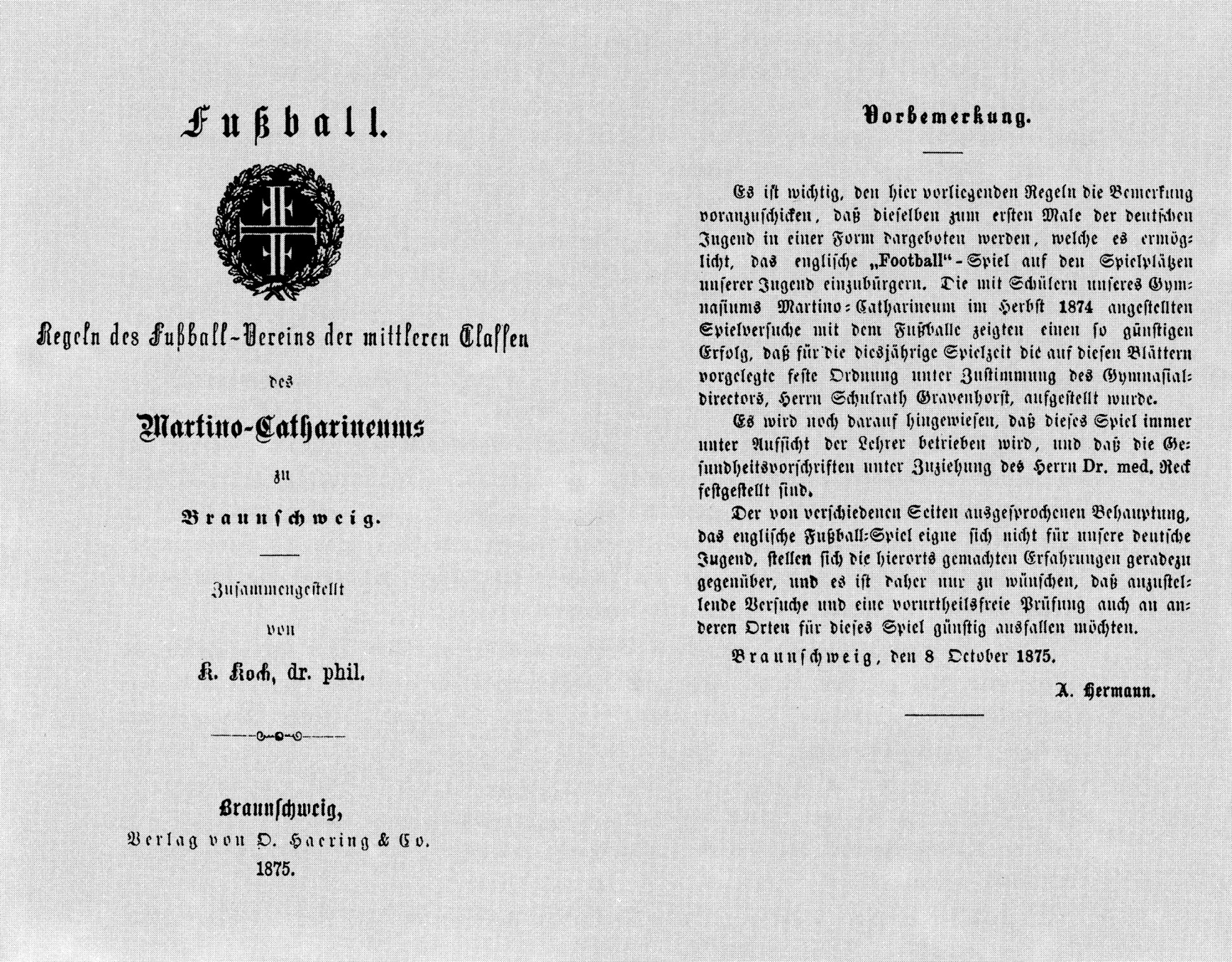
The first German version of the rules of football by Konrad Koch

Koch was a pioneer in introducing ball games as part of physical education in German schools. He was influenced by the ideas of Thomas Arnold respectively Thomas Hughes' novel Tom Brown's School Days. In 1874 Koch and his colleague August Hermann organized what is believed to be the first-ever football match in Germany, between pupils from their school Martino-Katharineum. However, according to other sources, earlier games of football might have taken place in other German cities, possibly between members of the Dresden English Football Club.

In 1875, Koch published the first German version of the rules of football, although Koch's version of the game still closely resembled rugby football. The new game was quickly adopted by other schools in Braunschweig and spread to other cities during the late 1870s, including Hanover, Bremen, Hamburg, and Göttingen.

In 1876, a newspaper in Hamburg wrote that Koch had learned about football during a trip to England. This is likely false, as there are no sources that indicate that he had visited England before 1895. Koch did speak English, however, as he had been taught from a young age by his father, an English teacher.

== Personal life ==
Koch was a close friend of novelist Wilhelm Raabe, and like Raabe, C.F. Theodore Steinway and Heinrich Büssing, among others, a member of the social club Die ehrlichen Kleiderseller zu Braunschweig.

== Selected works ==
- Daa augmento apud Homerum omisso (1867)
- Fußball. Regeln des Fußball-Vereins der mittleren Klassen des Martino-Katharineums zu Braunschweig (1875)
- Fußball, das englische Winterspiel (1877)
- Der erziehliche Werth der Schulspiele (1878)
- Die Geschichte des Fußballs im Altertum und in der Neuzeit (1894)
- Die Erziehung zum Mute durch Turnen, Spiel und Sport. Die geistige Seite der Leibesübungen (1900)

== In fiction ==
The 2011 German drama film Lessons of a Dream (German: Der ganz große Traum) is loosely based on Koch's life. In the film, Koch is portrayed by Daniel Brühl.

== Bibliography ==
- Hoffmeister, Kurt (2011). Der Wegbereiter des Fußballspiels in Deutschland. Prof. Dr. Konrad Koch 1846–1911. Eine Biografie. ISBN 978-3-84234-921-6
- Oberschelp, Malte (2010). Der Fußball-Lehrer. Wie Konrad Koch im Kaiserreich den Ball ins Spiel brachte. ISBN 978-3-89533-723-9

== See also ==
- Football in Germany
