= Tatsuhisa Suzuki =

Japanese voice actor

- 鈴木 達央
- Born: November 11, 1983 (age 43); Ichikawa, Chiba, Japan
- Other name: Ta_2
- Occupations: Voice actor; singer
- Years active: 2003–present
- Height: 173 cm (5 ft 8 in)
- Spouse: Lisa (m. 2020)
- Children: 1
- Musical career
- Genres: J-pop; anime song; rock
- Instrument: Vocals
- Years active: 2005–present
- Label: Lantis
- Formerly of: Oldcodex

Tatsuhisa Suzuki (鈴木 達央, Suzuki Tatsuhisa; born November 11, 1983) is a Japanese voice actor and singer. As the co-founder and former lead vocalist of Oldcodex, he used his stage name Ta_2.

== Biography ==
Shūkan Bunshun reported that Suzuki was engaged to Lisa in May 2019. In January 2020, they announced their marriage. On April 25, 2023, they announced the birth of their first child on Instagram.

On August 4, 2021, Suzuki went on hiatus due to poor health, following a report published on July 30 by Shūkan Bunshun alleging that he had an extramarital affair with a female co-worker. Suzuki had violated a non-disclosure agreement during the affair regarding music he and Oldcodex had been working on for other anime series. On August 30, 2021, Suzuki released a statement apologizing for careless behavior. Suzuki withdrew from Ultraman. He was also recast in Kikai Sentai Zenkaiger, the CD bonuses for the game adaptation of My Next Life as a Villainess: All Routes Lead to Doom!, Pokémon Journeys: The Series, Alchemy Stars, The Misfit of Demon King Academy, and Tokyo Revengers. However, Kyoto Animation confirmed that they did not replace him in Free!.

On October 31, 2023, Suzuki announced on Twitter that he had left I'm Enterprise and is working freelance.

== Filmography ==
=== Anime series ===
2003

- Dear Boys (Tsutomu Ishii)
- D.N.Angel (Masahiro Sekimoto)
- Mermaid Melody Pichi Pichi Pitch (Third Tachi Brother)

2004

- Aishiteruze Baby (Kazuhiro Tsuchiya)
- Gakuen Alice (Male student B, Reo's subordinate D, Yokoi)
- My-HiME (Male Student)
- Pokémon: Advanced (Kent)
- Saiyuki Gunlock (Castle Guard, Demon)

2005

- Best Student Council (Male Student 2)
- Bleach (Soul Reaper)
- Cluster Edge (No. 1)
- Hell Girl (Delivery Man)
- Loveless (Boy, Male Student, Natsumi's Father)
- Rozen Maiden (Baseball Player, Flower, Male Student)
- Shakugan no Shana (Vine)
- Shuffle! (Lottery Clerk)
- Solty Rei (Andy Anderson)
- Tide-Line Blue (Deputy Teshio)

2006

- Gaiking: Legend of Daiku-Maryu (Dick Alcain)
- Gin-iro no Olynssis (Akira)
- Gintama (Musashi)
- Hell Girl (Yohei)
- Kasimasi: Girl Meets Girl (Yanamoto)
- Lovely Idol (Yuji Nishizawa)
- The Familiar of Zero (Customer, Perisson)
- xxxHOLiC (Man)
- Wan Wan Celeb Soreyuke! Tetsunoshin (Rinia)

2007

- Digimon Data Squad (Magnamon)
- Dancouga Nova – Super God Beast Armor (Sakuya Kamon)
- Kamichama Karin (Jin Kuga)
- Nodame Cantabile (Yohei Hashimoto)

2008

- A Certain Magical Index (Ao Amai)
- Black Butler (Viscount Druitt)
- Library War (Hikaru Tezuka)
- Pokémon the Series: Diamond and Pearl (Jun)
- Wangan Midnight (Maki Kamiya)

2009

- Heaven's Lost Property (Eishirō Sugata)
- Miracle Train: Ōedo-sen e Yōkoso (Fuku Nishi-Shinjuku-Gochome)
- Corpse Princess (Hizuchi)

2010

- Baka and Test: Summon the Beasts (Yuji Sakamoto)
- Black Butler II (Viscount Druitt)
- Heaven's Lost Property Forte (Eishirō Sugata)
- Omamori Himari (Taizō Masaki)
- Tono to Issho (Date Masamune)

2011

- Beyblade: Metal Fury (Chris)
- Baka and Test: Summon the Beasts 2 (Yūji Sakamoto)
- Bakugan Battle Brawlers: Gundalian Invaders (Linus)
- Blood-C (Shinichirō Tokizane)
- Mashiroiro Symphony (Hayata Mukunashi)
- Sket Dance (Shinpei Takemitsu)
- Tono to Issho: Gantai no Yabō (Date Masamune)

2012

- Arashi no Yoru ni: Himitsu no Tomodachi (Tapu)
- My Little Monster (Haru Yoshida)
- Kuroko's Basketball (Kazunari Takao)
- Saint Seiya Omega (Wolf Haruto)

2013

- A Certain Scientific Railgun S (Ao Amai)
- Arata Kangatari (Akachi)
- Beyond the Boundary (Hiroomi Nase)
- Case Closed (Takuro Yoda)
- Free! (Makoto Tachibana)
- Inazuma Eleven GO Galaxy (Munemasa Ibuki, Bark Separk, Jinsuke Manabe, Maxim Adrov, Sevan Basha, Song Ji-Hun)
- Kuroko's Basketball Season 2 (Kazunari Takao)
- Maoyu (Soldier Apprentice)
- Servant × Service (Yutaka Hasebe)
- Uta no Prince-sama – Maji Love 2000% (Ranmaru Kurosaki)

2014

- Ace of Diamond (Yuuta Mishima)
- Bakumatsu Rock (Shinsaku Takasugi)
- Brynhildr in the Darkness (Kurofuku)
- Free! Eternal Summer (Makoto Tachibana)
- HappinessCharge PreCure! (Kenta Yamazaki)
- Hozuki's Coolheadedness (Haru, Inch-High Samurai)
- Invaders of the Rokujouma!? (Kenji Matsudaira)
- Monthly Girls' Nozaki-kun (Oze/Male Student)
- Nobunagun (Jack the Ripper/Adam Muirhead)
- Merman in My Tub (Takasu)
- The Seven Deadly Sins (Ban)

2015

- Dance with Devils (Roen)
- Diabolik Lovers More, Blood (Yuma Mukami)
- Fafner in the Azure: Exodus (Mitsugu Jinnai)
- Ghost in the Shell: Arise Alternative Architecture (Akira Hose)
- Kuroko's Basketball Season 3 (Kazunari Takao)
- Pokémon the Series: XYZ (Ippei)
- Transformers: Mystery of Convoy (Lockdown)
- Seraph of the End (Shinya Hiragi)
- The Perfect Insider (Yukihiro Yamane)
- Uta no Prince-sama Revolutions (Ranmaru Kurosaki)

2016

- Dagashi Kashi (Tō Endō)
- The High School Life of a Fudanshi (Yūjirō Shiratori)
- Prince of Stride: Alternative (Tasuku Senoo)
- Scared Rider Xechs (Yosuke Christoph Komae)
- Servamp (Tsubaki)
- Tsukiuta. The Animation (Mikaduki Yuzuru)
- Uta no Prince-sama Maji Love Legend Star (Ranmaru Kurosaki)

2017

- Akashic Records of Bastard Magic Instructor (Jatice Lowfan)
- Blend S (Kōyō Akizuki)
- ēlDLIVE (Laine Brick)
- Nana Maru San Batsu (Takumi Niina)

2018

- Bakumatsu (Tokugawa Yoshinobu)
- Butlers: Chitose Momotose Monogatari (Koma Jinguji)
- Dagashi Kashi 2 (Tō Endō)
- Free!: Dive to The Future (Makoto Tachibana)
- JoJo's Bizarre Adventure: Golden Wind (Prosciutto)
- Island (Setsuna Sanzenkai)
- Magical Girl Site (Kiichirō Misumi)
- Magical Girl Ore (Magical Girl Everything Crazy Beauty)
- Megalobox (Mikio Shirato)
- My Sweet Tyrant (Atsuhiro Kagari)
- Record of Grancrest War (Ion)
- The Seven Deadly Sins: Revival of the Commandments (Ban)

2019

- Attack on Titan Season 3 Part 2 (Grice)
- Namu Amida Butsu!: Rendai Utena (Ashura)
- To the Abandoned Sacred Beasts (Roy (Garm))
- Kengan Ashura (Ohma Tokita / Ashura)
- The Ones Within (Hikaru Genji)
- Bakumatsu Crisis (Tokugawa Yoshinobu)
- Special 7: Special Crime Investigation Unit (Kujaku "Analyzer" Nijō)
- African Office Worker (Honey Badger)
- The Seven Deadly Sins: Wrath of the Gods (Ban)
- Assassins Pride (William Jin)
- Blade of the Immortal -Immortal- (Taito Magatsu)

2020

- Somali and the Forest Spirit (Yabashira)
- My Next Life as a Villainess: All Routes Lead to Doom! (Alan Stuart)
- The Misfit of Demon King Academy (Anos Voldigoad)
- Pokémon Journeys: The Series (Raihan (episodes 27-45))
- Moriarty the Patriot (Blitz Enders)
- The God of High School (Axley Ivanovic)

2021

- Black Clover (Zenon Zogratis)
- The Seven Deadly Sins: Dragon's Judgement (Ban)
- Those Snow White Notes (Rai Nagamori)
- Burning Kabaddi (Kyōhei Misumi)
- Megalobox 2: Nomad (Mikio Shirato)
- Tokyo Revengers (Ken "Draken" Ryūgūji)
- Welcome to Demon School! Iruma-kun Season 2 (Ronove Lomiere)
- Shaman King (Ryo Sugimoto)
- My Next Life as a Villainess: All Routes Lead to Doom! X (Alan Stuart)
- Tesla Note (Kuruma)

2022

- VazzRock the Animation (Yuzuru Mikazuki)

2023

- Nier: Automata Ver1.1a (Eve)

2024

- The New Gate (Wolfgang Estaria)

2026

- Welcome to Demon School! Iruma-kun Season 4 (Ronove Lomiere)

2027

- No-Clipping My Way to Supremacy! (Guillermo)

=== Original video animation / Original net animation ===
- Saint Beast: Ikusen no Hiru to Yoru Hen (2005-2006) (Pearl)
- Sin in the Rain (Suspect)
- Master of Martial Hearts (2008-2009) (Hiroki Honma)
- Tenchi Muyo! War on Geminar (2009-2010) (Ulyte)
- Tono to Issho (Date Masamune)
- Heaven's Lost Property (2010) (Eishiro Sugata)
- Baka to Test to Shōkanjū: Matsuri (2011) (Yuji Sakamoto)
- Tight-rope (2013) (Ryunosuke Ohara)
- My Little Monster (2013) (Yoshida Haru)
- Kick-Heart (2013) (Romeo Maki/Masked Man M)
- Alice in Borderland (2014) (Daikichi Karube)
- Diabolik Lovers (2015) (Yuma Mukami)
- Free! Eternal Summer (2015) (Makoto Tachibana)
- The Seven Deadly Sins (2015) (Ban)
- Brotherhood: Final Fantasy XV (2016) (Noctis Lucis Caelum)
- Oblivion Battery (2020) (Aoi Tōdō)
- Record of Ragnarok (2021-2023) (Shiva)
- Ultraman – Season 2 (2022) (Kotaro Higashi / Ultraman Taro) – Replaced by Tomoaki Maeno
- The Grimm Variations (2024) – Jacob Grimm

=== Anime films ===
- Altered Carbon: Resleeved (Takeshi Kovacs)
- Black Butler: Book of the Atlantic (Viscount Druitt)
- Free!–the Final Stroke– Kouhen (Makoto Tachibana)
- Free! Take Your Marks (Makoto Tachibana)
- Free! Timeless Medley (Makoto Tachibana)
- Free!–the Final Stroke– Zenpen (Makoto Tachibana)
- Ghost in the Shell: Arise (Akira Hose)
- Heaven's Lost Property the Movie: The Angeloid of Clockwork (Eishiro Sugata)
- High Speed! Free! Starting Days (Makoto Tachibana)
- Inazuma Eleven: Saikyō Gundan Ōga Shūrai (Eska Bammel)
- Majime Fumajime Kaiketsu Zorori Nazono Takara Taisakusen (Nyanga)
- Keroro Gunsō the Super Movie (Yamada-sensei)
- Kingsglaive: Final Fantasy XV (Noctis Lucis Caelum)
- Kuroko's Basketball The Movie: Last Game (Kazunari Takao)
- My Next Life as a Villainess: All Routes Lead to Doom! The Movie (Alan Stuart)
- Seven Days War (Sōma Ogata)
- The Seven Deadly Sins: Cursed by Light (Ban)
- The Seven Deadly Sins: Grudge of Edinburgh (Ban)
- The Seven Deadly Sins the Movie: Prisoners of the Sky (Ban)
- Towa no Quon (Ryou)

=== Video games ===
- 13 Sentinels: Aegis Rim (Shu Amiguchi, Tetsuya Ida)
- Arknights (Aosta)
- Bakumatsu Rock (Shinsaku Takasugi)
- Birdie Crush (Kris Lowell)
- Breath of Fire 6 (Protagonist (Male))
- Call of Duty: Modern Warfare 3 (Sandman)
- Da Capo: Girl's Symphony (Ryohei Shinomiya)
- Datenshi no Amai Yuuwaku x Kaikan Phrase (Sakuya Okochi)
- Dear Boys Fast Break! (Tsutomu Ishii)
- Diabolik Lovers series (Yuma Mukami)
- Disgaea 4: A Promise Unforgotten (Valvatorez)
- Disgaea D2: A Brighter Darkness (Valvatorez)
- Dissidia Final Fantasy NT (Noctis Lucis Caelum)
- Dissidia Final Fantasy Opera Omnia (Noctis Lucis Caelum)
- Fatal Frame: Maiden of Black Water (Hōjō Ren)
- Fate/Grand Order (Ashwatthama)
- Final Fantasy XIV: A Realm Reborn (Aymeric)
- Final Fantasy XIV: Heavensward (Aymeric)
- Final Fantasy XV (Noctis Lucis Caelum)
- Final Fantasy Resonance (Noctis Lucis Caelum)
- Fire Emblem: Radiant Dawn (Ranulf, Tibarn)
- Fire Emblem Echoes: Shadows of Valentia (Berkut)
- Fire Emblem Heroes (Alfonse)
- Food Fantasy (2018) – Bamboo Rice
- Granblue Fantasy (Aglovale, Helnar)
- Gundam Breaker 3 (Will)
- Gunslinger Stratos 3 (Argo Odhner)
- Heaven's Lost Property (Eishiro Sugata)
- Itadaki Street: Dragon Quest and Final Fantasy 30th Anniversary (Noctis Lucis Caelum)
- JoJo's Bizarre Adventure: All Star Battle (Ghiaccio)
- JoJo's Bizarre Adventure: All Star Battle R (Prosciutto)
- JoJo's Bizarre Adventure: Eyes of Heaven (Ghiaccio)
- Kaikan Phrase CLIMAX -Next Generation- (Reon Okochi)
- Nier: Automata (Eve)
- Onmyōji (Minamoto no Hiromasa)
- Palais de Reine (Winfried)
- Palais de Royale (Winfried)
- Sdorica (Jerome Muca, Jerome SP)
- Shakugan no Shana (Ryūgan)
- Shinobi, Koi Utsutsu (Anayama Daisuke)
- Soul Nomad & the World Eaters (Levin, Rasukyuran)
- Super Robot Wars (Sakuya Kamon)
- Sword Art Online: Fatal Bullet (Itsuki)
- Tales of Crestoria (Aegis Alver)
- Tales of Fandom Vol.2 (Larry Hughes)
- Tekken 7 (Noctis Lucis Caelum)
- The King of Fighters All Star (Ban)
- The Seven Deadly Sins: Grand Cross (Ban)
- Uta no Prince-sama (Ranmaru Kurosaki)
- World of Final Fantasy Maxima (Noctis Lucis Caelum)
- Zero: Nuregarasu no Miko (Ren Hōjō)
- Zero Escape: The Nonary Games (Junpei)
- Zero Escape: Zero Time Dilemma (Junpei)
- Kamen Rider: Memory of Heroez- Eiji Hino/Kamen Rider OOO

=== Drama CDs ===
- Twinkle Stars (2010) (Saki)
- A Devil and Her Love Song (????) (Kanda Yuusuke)
- Akaiito (2015) (Touya Nanjou)
- Diabolik Lovers series (2012-) (Yuma Mukami)
- Utsukushii koto (????) (Matsuoka Yousuke)
- Itoshii koto (????) (Matsuoka Yousuke)
- Watashi ga Motete Dōsunda (2015) (Nozomu Nanashima)
- Mo Dao Zu Shi/Ma Dou So Shi (2020) (Wei Wuxian/Gi Musen)

=== Live-action films ===
- Library Wars: The Last Mission (2015)

=== Tokusatsu ===
- Tokumei Sentai Go-Busters (2012–2013) – Usada Lettuce
- Kamen Rider × Super Sentai: Super Hero Taisen (2012) – Usada Lettuce, Shinji Kido/Kamen Rider Ryuki, Kai Ozu/Magi Red
- Tokumei Sentai Go-Busters the Movie: Protect the Tokyo Enetower! (2012) – Usada Lettuce
- Tokumei Sentai Go-Busters vs. Kaizoku Sentai Gokaiger: The Movie (2013) – Usada Lettuce
- Kamen Rider × Super Sentai × Space Sheriff: Super Hero Taisen Z (2013) – Usada Lettuce
- Tokumei Sentai Go-Busters Returns vs. Dōbutsu Sentai Go-Busters (2013) – Usada Lettuce
- Ultraman Ginga S The Movie (2015) – Etelgar
- Kikai Sentai Zenkaiger (2021) – Gege (1 – 21)

=== Dubbing roles ===
==== Live-action ====
- 24: Legacy (Eric Carter (Corey Hawkins))
- Avengers: Doomsday (John Walker / U.S. Agent (Wyatt Russell))
- Breach (Noah (Cody Kearsley))
- Divergent (Tobias "Four" Eaton (Theo James))
- The Divergent Series: Insurgent (Tobias "Four" Eaton (Theo James))
- The Divergent Series: Allegiant (Tobias "Four" Eaton (Theo James))
- Escape Room (Jason Walker (Jay Ellis))
- The Falcon and the Winter Soldier (John Walker / Captain America / U.S. Agent (Wyatt Russell))
- Flatliners (Jamie (James Norton))
- Free Solo (Alex Honnold)
- Genius (Eduard Einstein (Eugene Simon))
- Lessons of a Dream (Konrad Koch (Daniel Brühl))
- Magadheera (Kala Bhairava / Harsha (Ram Charan))
- Master (Park Jang-goon (Kim Woo-bin))
- Miss Bala (Lino Esparza (Ismael Cruz Córdova))
- Mortal Kombat (Cole Young (Lewis Tan))
- Mortal Kombat II (Cole Young (Lewis Tan))
- The Mummy (Malik (Marwan Kenzari))
- Night Swim (Ray Waller (Wyatt Russell))
- Power Rangers (Zack Taylor/Black Ranger (Ludi Lin))
- Running Wild with Bear Grylls (Alex Honnold)
- Scary Stories to Tell in the Dark (Ramón Morales (Michael Garza))
- Star Trek: Picard (Narek (Harry Treadaway))
- Thunderbolts* (John Walker / U.S. Agent (Wyatt Russell))

==== Animation ====
- Captain Underpants: The First Epic Movie (George Beard)
- The Dark Crystal: Age of Resistance (Rian)
- Mao Mao: Heroes of Pure Heart (Mao Mao)
- Peter Rabbit (Johnny Town-Mouse)
- Peter Rabbit 2: The Runaway (Johnny Town-Mouse)
- Scoob! (Shaggy Rogers)
