= Scared Rider Xechs =

Japanese video game and anime series

スカーレッドライダーゼクス (Sukaāreddo Raidā Zekusu)
- Video game
- Developer: Rejet
- Publisher: Red Entertainment
- Released: PlayStation 2: JP: July 1, 2010; PlayStation Vita: JP: November 19, 2015
- Anime television series
- Directed by: Hideto Komori
- Produced by: Shūichi Takashino; Toshiaki Tanaka; Oshi Yoshinuma; Hiroaki Yozawa
- Written by: Naruki Nagakawa
- Music by: Takeshi Abo; Nao Harada
- Studio: Satelight
- Licensed by: NA: Funimation
- Original network: TV Tokyo, AT-X
- English network: SEA: Animax Asia
- Original run: July 5, 2016 – September 20, 2016
- Episodes: 12

Scared Rider Xechs (Japanese: スカーレッドライダーゼクス, Hepburn: Sukāreddo Raidā Zekusu) is a Japanese otome game published by Red Entertainment. It was released in Japan on July 1, 2010, for the PlayStation 2. A fan disc titled Scared Rider Xechs: Stardust Lovers was released in 2011. The game was ported to the PlayStation Vita in 2015. A 12-episode anime television series adaptation by Satelight aired between July 5 and September 20, 2016.

== Characters ==
Akira Asagi (麻黄 アキラ, Asagi Akira)
Voiced by: Ayaka Shimizu
Yosuke Christoph Komae (駒江 クリストフ・ヨウスケ, Komae Kurisutofu Yōsuke)
Voiced by: Tatsuhisa Suzuki
Takuto Kirisawa (霧澤 タクト, Kirisawa Takuto)
Voiced by: Mamoru Miyano
Yuji Tsuga (津賀 ユゥジ, Tsuga Yūji)
Voiced by: Takashi Kondō
Hiro Kurama (鞍馬 ヒロ, Kurama Hiro)
Voiced by: Hiro Shimono
Kazuki Suzuki (錫木 カズキ, Kazuki Suzuki)
Voiced by: Hiroki Takahashi
Hijiri Mutsuki (無月 ヒジリ, Mutsuki Hijiri)
Voiced by: Kenn
Fernandes (フェルナンデス, Ferunandesu)
Voiced by: Eiji Takemoto
Les Paul (レスポール, Resupōru)
Voiced by: Daisuke Namikawa
Diviser (ディバイザー, Dibaizā)
Voiced by: Rikiya Koyama
Duesenberg (デュセンバーグ, Dyusenbāgu)
Voiced by: Naozumi Takahashi
Rickenbacker (リッケンバッカー, Rikkenbakkā)
Voiced by: Nobuhiko Okamoto
Epiphone (エピフォン, Epifon)
Voiced by: Yuuki Fujiwara
Hako Salome Sakura (佐倉 サロメ・ハコ, Sakura Sarome Hako)
Voiced by: Satomi Akesaka

== Media ==
=== Anime ===
A 12-episode anime television series adaptation by Satelight aired between July 5 and September 20, 2016. The opening theme is "Ao to Kurenai no Forzato" (青と紅のフォルツァート, Ao to Kurenai no Foruzatto) performed by Tatsuhisa Suzuki and Mamoru Miyano. The ending theme is "old revelation" performed by Kenn. Funimation streamed the series in North America and AnimeLab streamed the series in Australia.

| No. | Title | Original air date |
|---|---|---|
| 1 | "RYUKYU Calling" | July 5, 2016 |
| 2 | "Combat Rock" | July 12, 2016 |
| 3 | "The Right Profile" | July 19, 2016 |
| 4 | "Hi-Fi Highway" | July 26, 2016 |
| 5 | "Plan 6 Channel 5" | August 2, 2016 |
| 6 | "My Generation" | August 9, 2016 |
| 7 | "Quadrophenia" | August 16, 2016 |
| 8 | "to Be Someone" | August 23, 2016 |
| 9 | "Away From The Number" | August 30, 2016 |
| 10 | "Stay or Go" | September 6, 2016 |
| 11 | "Not of This Blue Earth" | September 13, 2016 |
| 12 | "LAST GIG" | September 20, 2016 |
