= Rejet =

Japanese media company

Rejet Co., Ltd.
- Native name: Rejet株式会社
- Romanized name: Rejet Kabushiki-gaisha
- Type: Private (Kabushiki gaisha)
- Industry: Information and Communication
- Founded: June 5, 2009; 17 years ago
- Headquarters: 4-13 Ichigayadaimachi, Shinjuku-ku, Tokyo, Japan
- Key people: Daisuke Iwasaki (President & Founder)
- Products: Video games, Drama CDs, Music, Merchandise (specifically for the "Otome" market)
- Net income: 170 million JPY (2019)
- Number of employees: 48 (2025)
- Website: rejet.jp

Rejet Inc. is a media production company for women headquartered in Shinjuku-ku, Tokyo, Japan. They provide a comprehensive range of media for women, including music CDs, drama CDs, games, books, merchandise, and events.

The representative director is Daisuke Iwasaki. Employee creators include Hirotaka Maeda.

== Overview ==
- Daisuke Iwasaki, a former employee of the home video game console development company HuneX, founded the company on June 5, 2009, with illustrator Hirotaka Maeda after going independent.
- The representative works include DIABOLIK LOVERS, Pythagoras Production, Ken ga Kimi, Dear♥Vocalist, and Yuugen Romantica.
- Daisuke Iwasaki himself plans and writes the lyrics for their songs.
- Tomokazu Sugita voices the companies mascot Kuma D (クマD).
- The company operates the online store "SKiT Dolce" which sells its own merchandise, the physical store "Rejet shop," and the event "Rejet Fes".
- DMM GAMES acquired shares in 2018.

== List of Works ==
- Black Wolves Saga
- Ken ga Kimi
- Lucien Bee series
- Scared Rider Xechs
- Love Boss series
- Gekkaryoran ROMANCE
- Minus 8 (-8)
- Diabolik Lovers
- Marginal 4
- Dance with Devils

== Drama CDs ==
- Issei Fuubi -Gyakuten Ooku Koi Emaki- (一世風靡-逆転大奥恋絵巻-, Issei Fuubi -Gyakuten Ooku Koi Emaki-)
- Ookami-kun Chi. (オオカミ君ち。, Ookami-kun Chi.)
- Oz and the Secret Love (オズと秘密の愛, Oz to Himitsu no Ai)
- Onmyouji Genyaroku - Sleep in My Palm (-陰陽師幻夜録- 我が掌で眠れ, Onmyouji Genyaroku - Waga Tenohira de Nemure)
- C'mon Fellows! (カモンフェローズ！, Kamon Ferouzu!)
- CARNELIAN BLOOD
- Criminale! Series (クリミナーレ！ シリーズ, Kuriminaare! Siriizu)
  - Criminale! (クリミナーレ！, Kuriminaare!)
  - Criminale! F (クリミナーレ！F, Kuriminaare! F)
  - Criminale! X (クリミナーレ！X, Kuriminaare! X)
  - Criminale! DUELLO (クリミナーレ！DUELLO, Kuriminaare! DUELLO) (Note: The series' first spin-off work.)
  - Criminale! R (クリミナーレ！R, Kuriminaare! R)
  - Criminale! T (クリミナーレ！T, Kuriminaare! T) (Note: Rejet 10th Anniversary Work.)
- Princes of Grimm Street (グリム街の王子様, Gurimu-gai no Oujisama)
- Kuro-Yoshiwara Melancholia (黒吉原メランコリア, Kuro-Yoshiwara Merankoria)
- Corpse†Heart
- SACRIFICE
- Cia Voice (シアボイス, Shia Boisu)
- Jigoku Onsen (地獄温泉, Jigoku Onsen)
- Shuukyoku no Dolls (終極のDolls, Shuukyoku no Dooruzu)
- Shinsengumi Wasurenagusa Series (新撰組勿忘草 シリーズ, Shinsengumi Wasurenagusa Siriizu)
  - Shinsengumi Mokuhiroku Wasurenagusa (新撰組黙秘録 勿忘草, Shinsengumi Mokuhiroku Wasurenagusa)
  - Shinsengumi Kekkionroku Wasurenagusa (新撰組血魂録 勿忘草, Shinsengumi Kekkionroku Wasurenagusa)
  - Shinsengumi Hiyokuroku Wasurenagusa (新撰組比翼録 勿忘草, Shinsengumi Hiyokuroku Wasurenagusa)
  - Shinsengumi Gyoufuuroku Wasurenagusa (新撰組暁風録 勿忘草, Shinsengumi Gyoufuuroku Wasurenagusa)
- SEVENTH HEAVEN
- Zenryoku Shounen-tachi no Outa Series (全力少年達のおうた シリーズ, Zenryoku Shounen-tachi no Outa Siriizu)
  - Zenryoku Shounen-tachi no Outa & Toriai (全力少年達のおうた＆とりあい, Zenryoku Shounen-tachi no Outa & Toriai)
  - Zenryoku Shounen-tachi no Outa: 2nd Period (全力少年達のおうた 2時間目, Zenryoku Shounen-tachi no Outa 2-jikanme)
- Soubou Sangokushi (想望三國志, Soubou Sangokushi)
- Taisho Idol Romance "Teikoku Star" Series (大正偶像浪漫「帝國スタア」シリーズ, Taisho Guuzou Rouman "Teikoku Staa" Siriizu)
  - Taisho Idol Romance "Teikoku Star" (大正偶像浪漫「帝國スタア」, Taisho Guuzou Rouman "Teikoku Staa")
  - Taisho Idol Romance "Teikoku Star" Cinematograph (大正偶像浪漫「帝國スタア」キネマトグラフ, Taisho Guuzou Rouman "Teikoku Staa" Kinematogurafu)
- Taisho Kuro Kizoku (大正黒華族, Taisho Kuro Kazoku)
- THANATOS NiGHT Series (THANATOS NiGHTシリーズ, Thanatos Night Siriizu)
  - THANATOS NiGHT
  - THANATOS NiGHT Re:Vival
- CHU♥LDK
- Dear♥Vocalist Series
  - Dear♥Vocalist (ディア♥ヴォーカリスト, Dia♥Vookarisuto)
  - Dear♥Vocalist Riot (ディア♥ヴォーカリスト Riot, Dia♥Vookarisuto Riot)
  - Dear♥Vocalist Wired (ディア♥ヴォーカリスト Wired, Dia♥Vookarisuto Waiaado)
  - Dear♥Vocalist Xtreme (ディア♥ヴォーカリスト Xtreme, Dia♥Vookarisuto Ekustoriimu)
  - Dear♥Vocalist Evolve (ディア♥ヴォーカリスト Evolve, Dia♥Vookarisuto Eborubu)
  - Dear♥Vocalist Raving Beats!!! (ディア♥ヴォーカリスト Raving Beats!!!, Dia♥Vookarisuto Reibingu Biitsu!!!)
  - Dear♥Vocalist Unlimited (ディア♥ヴォーカリスト Unlimited, Dia♥Vookarisuto Anrimiteddo)
  - Dear♥Vocalist Headliner (ディア♥ヴォーカリスト Headliner, Dia♥Vookarisuto Heddorainaa)
  - Dear♥Vocalist Survival Wars #1 - 6 (ディア♥ヴォーカリスト Survival Wars #1 - 6, Dia♥Vookarisuto Sabaibaru Woozu #1 - 6)
  - Dear♥Vocalist THE BEST Rock Out!!! (ディア♥ヴォーカリスト THE BEST Rock Out!!!, Dia♥Vookarisuto THE BEST Rock Out!!!)
  - Dear♥Vocalist THE BEST Rock Out!!! #2 (ディア♥ヴォーカリスト THE BEST Rock Out!!! #2, Dia♥Vookarisuto THE BEST Rock Out!!! #2)
- Diabolik Lovers (A completely new drama CD and character song titled "DIABOLIK LOVERS HOUSE OF VAMPIRE" was scheduled for release in 2021 but was indefinitely postponed)
  - DIABOLIK LOVERS Do-S Kyuuketsu CD (DIABOLIK LOVERS ドS吸血CD, Diabolik Lovers Do-S Kyuuketsu CD)
  - DIABOLIK LOVERS Blood & LoveSweet
  - DIABOLIK LOVERS Do-S Kyuuketsu CD VERSUS - VERSUS IV Series (DIABOLIK LOVERS ドS吸血CD VERSUS～VERSUSⅣ シリーズ, Diabolik Lovers Do-S Kyuuketsu CD VERSUS - VERSUS IV Siriizu) (1st vol: Aug-Oct 2012, 2nd vol: Apr-Sep 2014, 3rd vol: Apr-Sep 2016, 4th vol: Oct 2017-Mar 2018)
  - DIABOLIK LOVERS Do-S Kyuuketsu CD MORE,BLOOD (DIABOLIK LOVERS ドS吸血CD MORE,BLOOD, Diabolik Lovers Do-S Kyuuketsu CD MORE,BLOOD)
  - DIABOLIK LOVERS DARK FATE
  - DIABOLIK LOVERS Do-S Kyuuketsu CD BLOODY BOUQUET (DIABOLIK LOVERS ドS吸血CD BLOODY BOUQUET, Diabolik Lovers Do-S Kyuuketsu CD Bloody Bouquet)
  - DIABOLIK LOVERS LOST EDEN
  - DIABOLIK LOVERS Pala-Selene
  - DIABOLIK LOVERS CHAOS LINEAGE
  - DIABOLIK LOVERS Do-S Kyuuketsu CD Mukami Family 5th Eternal Blood (DIABOLIK LOVERS ドS吸血CD 無神家5th Eternal Blood, Diabolik Lovers Do-S Kyuuketsu CD Mukamike 5th Eternal Blood)
  - DIABOLIK LOVERS ZERO (DIABOLIK LOVERS ZERO, Diabolik Lovers Zero)
  - DIABOLIK LOVERS Do-S Kyuuketsu CD Tsukinami & Kino Born To Die (DIABOLIK LOVERS ドS吸血CD 月浪＆キノ Born To Die, Diabolik Lovers Do-S Kyuuketsu CD Tsukinami & Kino Born To Die)
  - DIABOLIK LOVERS MORE, MORE BLOOD
  - DIABOLIK LOVERS DAYLIGHT
- 7th Special Task Unit: "Jukkyou Cemetery" (第七特命課 「十狂セメタリー」, Dai-nana Tokumeika "Jukkyou Semetarii")
- Tougenkyou AYAKASHI CHILDREN (桃源郷 AYAKASHI CHILDREN, Tougenkyou Ayakashi Chirudoren)
- HAPPY SUGAR Series (HAPPY SUGAR シリーズ, Happii Shugaa Siriizu)
  - √HAPPY+SUGAR=DARLIN
  - √HAPPY+SUGAR=IDOL
  - √HAPPY+SUGAR=VACATION
  - √HAPPY+SUGAR=SAND
- Mitsu-Koi (Honey) Liar!? (蜜恋（ハニー）ライアー!?, Mitsu-Koi (Hanii) Raiaa!?)
- Paradise o' Whisper (パラダイスo'ウィスパー, Paradaisu o' Wisupaa)
- VANQUISH BROTHERS
- FRESH KISS 100%
- FORBIDDEN★STAR
- Midnight Jiangshi Series (ミッドナイトキョンシー シリーズ, Middonaito Kyonshii Siriizu)
  - Midnight Jiangshi (ミッドナイトキョンシー, Middonaito Kyonshii)
  - Midnight Jiangshi: Tenchou Yuugi (ミッドナイトキョンシー 天頂遊戯, Middonaito Kyonshii Tenchou Yuugi)
- Meiji Kyuuketsu Kitan "Tsukiyasha" Series (明治吸血奇譚「月夜叉」シリーズ, Meiji Kyuuketsu Kitan "Tsukiyasha" Siriizu)
  - Meiji Kyuuketsu Kitan "Tsukiyasha" (明治吸血奇譚「月夜叉」, Meiji Kyuuketsu Kitan "Tsukiyasha")
  - Meiji Kyuuketsu Kitan "Tsukiyasha: Kurenai" (明治吸血奇譚「月夜叉 紅」, Meiji Kyuuketsu Kitan "Tsukiyasha Kurenai")
- Yuugen Romantica Series (幽幻ロマンチカ シリーズ, Yuugen Romantika Siriizu)
  - Yuugen Romantica (幽幻ロマンチカ, Yuugen Romantika)
  - Yuugen Romantica -Uchouten- (幽幻ロマンチカ-有頂天-, Yuugen Romantika -Uchouten-)
  - Yuugen Romantica -Hatenkou- (幽幻ロマンチカ-破天荒-, Yuugen Romantika -Hatenkou-)
  - Yuugen Romantica -Shin-kocchou- (幽幻ロマンチカ-真骨頂-, Yuugen Romantika -Shin-kocchou-)
  - Yuugen Romantica -Mantenka- (幽幻ロマンチカ-満天花-, Yuugen Romantika -Mantenka-)
  - Yuugen Romantica -Saikouchou- (幽幻ロマンチカ-最高潮-, Yuugen Romantika -Saikouchou-)
- Yotogi HoLiC (夜伽HoLiC, Yotogi HoLiC)
- Lacrimosa -The Seven Sins- (ラクリモサ-七つの罪-, Rakurimosa -Nanatsu no Tsumi-)
- LOVE★DON!!★QUIXOTE
- LIP ON MY PRINCE Series
  - LIP ON MY PRINCE
  - MOTTO♥LIP ON MY PRINCE
- Princess of Luciolle (リュシオルの姫, Ryushioru no Hime)
