= Adrian Moore (rapist) =

Australian criminal

Adrian Trevor Moore is a former police officer in Western Australia, convicted in October 2022 of drugging and sexually assaulting 13 women between 2007 and 2019, both during and after his police employment.

Moore used police computers to select victims, who he then drugged and subjected to violent sexual assaults, in some cases over an extended period. He was convicted in 2019 for misuse of restricted police computer systems, admitting 180 counts of accessing information relating to 92 women he had met on dating sites. He filmed the assaults, gathering "hundreds of thousands" of videos over more than a decade. The women were subjected to sadistic assaults, leaving at least one "bleeding from every orifice".

Following release, an investigation by Western Australia Police found further evidence, leading to an indictment on 108 charges in 2020. He was convicted in 2022 and sentenced to 30 years in jail.

The total number of actual victims has been estimated as high as 200.

== 60 Minutes Story ==
In March 2024, 60 Minutes Australia aired a full length investigative exposé as part of their 'Under Investigation' series on the Nine Network. The programme interviewed a number of Moore's victims who detailed the abuse perpetrated by Moore, including a fellow WA police officer. The programme detailed the failures of the Western Australia Police Force to stop Moore from assaulting other women. In January 2018 another female police officer that Moore had assaulted, reported him to Internal Affairs; who initially seized his computer and found thousands of videos and images of women being assaulted. The Internal Affairs unit claimed that they believed that the women in the videos had consented, and Moore was only charged and jailed for six months for misuse of police computer systems. The programme also brought on an Inspector who worked for the Independent Office for Police Conduct, the UK's Police Watchdog who handled two similar cases in the UK's Metropolitan Police; rapists David Carrick, and Wayne Couzens who assaulted women while being serving police officers.
