= Adrian Moore (German actor) =

German actor

- Born: Adrian Benjamin Moore; 1 January 1996 (age 29); Berlin, Germany
- Occupation: Actor
- Years active: 2002–2016

Adrian Benjamin Moore (born 1 January 1996) is a German former child actor.

== Career ==
Moore's first roles were minor characters in German drama's Storno (2002) and Im Schwitzkasten (2005). His breakthrough role came in 2011 when he played Joost Bornstedt in dramatic football film Lessons of a Dream, where he earned a nomination for the best performance in an international feature film in 'Leading Young Performer' category at the 33rd Young Artist Awards.

He left acting in 2016.

== Filmography ==
- 2002: Storno - Florian
- 2005: Im Schwitzkasten - Andi Lose
- 2010: Friendship - Jahre
- 2011: Lessons of a Dream - Joost Bornstedt
- 2011: Soko Wismar (1 episode) - Alex Bundschuh
- 2011: Mia and Me - Vincent
- 2012: Tatort (1 episode) - Fabian von Treunau
- 2014: Der Kriminalist (1 episode) - Felix Cloppenburg
- 2014: Josephine Klick - Allein unter Cops (1 episode) - Kai
- 2014: In aller Freundschaft (1 episode) - Lars Reichelt
- 2016: Letzte Spur Berlin (1 episode) - Ole Jacobsen
- 2016: Das Geheimnis der Hebamme - Lukas
