= Lessons of a Dream =

2011 German drama film

- German: Der ganz große Traum
- Directed by: Sebastian Grobler
- Screenplay by: Philipp Roth
- Produced by: Anatol Nitschke; Raoul B. Reinert
- Starring: Daniel Brühl; Burghart Klaußner; Justus von Dohnányi; Kathrin von Steinburg; Thomas Thieme; Jürgen Tonkel; Adrian Moore; Theo Trebs
- Cinematography: Martin Langer
- Edited by: Dirk Grau
- Music by: Ingo Frenzel
- Distributed by: Senator Film Verleih
- Release date: 24 February 2011 (Germany)
- Running time: 113 minutes
- Country: Germany
- Language: German
- Budget: €5.5 million

Lessons of a Dream (German: Der ganz große Traum) is a German drama film directed by Sebastian Grobler, loosely based on the life of late-19th-century football pioneer Konrad Koch. In the film, Koch is one of the first English teachers in the German Empire, in Braunschweig. He introduces his students to the new sport of football, completely unknown outside of England at the time, to get them interested in English culture and language. In the film, Koch's liberal teaching methods upset his conservative colleagues, the students' parents, and local dignitaries.

== Plot ==
In 1874, fresh Oxford graduate Konrad Koch is hired by headmaster Prof. Gustav Merfeld to teach English at the strictly run German boys school of Braunschweig. Everything the boys know about England and its culture are common prejudices handed down from their teachers and parents. The boys, led by class prefect Felix, habitually bully the diminutive Joost, whose mother is a proletarian, a social class deemed unfit for secondary education.

During an evening event, the chairman of the school board and Felix's father, Richard Hartung, chides Konrad for not raising children using strict Prussian discipline. In order to stir up enthusiasm for English, a subject resented by the students, Konrad, an adherent of Thomas Arnold's educational methods, decides to introduce the boys to football.

All the students except Felix embrace the new sport, and Konrad broadens the boys' vocabulary by incorporating football strategy into his teaching. Camaraderie between the students grows, and a sense of teamwork emerges for the first time, to the dismay of Felix, who is jealous of Joost's newfound recognition. The school board find out about Konrad's unorthodox educational strategy and bans it. Instead, Konrad initiates after-school and weekend practices, so that the boys can continue to play a game they have become fond of.

After they are informed of Konrad's initiative by Felix, the school board takes serious action. Konrad voluntarily resigns, and the students are placed in solitary confinement as punishment. Felix, feeling guilty about his deviousness, launches a plan with his classmates to escalate the matter to a visiting imperial delegation, with the help of the school secretary. The delegation lifts the ban and approves football's inclusion in the school curriculum. The students resume their practices under Konrad's guidance, despite continued opposition from the school board. A match is held between Konrad's students and a young English football team, and the German boys come out victorious, to the cheers of the delegation, teachers, parents, and the public.

== Cast ==
- Daniel Brühl as Konrad Koch
- Burghart Klaußner as Prof. Gustav Merfeld
- Justus von Dohnányi as Richard Hartung
- Kathrin von Steinburg as Klara Bornstedt
- Thomas Thieme as Dr. Roman Bosch
- Jürgen Tonkel as Dr. Jessen
- Axel Prahl as Schricker
- Josef Ostendorf as Pastor Werners
- Vincent Kastner as Officer Eugen Hohenlohe
- Adrian Moore as Joost Bornstedt
- Theo Trebs as Felix Hartung
- Till Valentin Winter as Otto Schricker
- Tim Blochwitz as Claasen
- Josef Dragus as Zumbrink
- Fabio Seyding as Hans
- Sten Horn as Wilhelm
- Lennart Betzgen as Emanuel
- Henriette Confurius as Rosalie

== Historical background ==
The real-life Konrad Koch was a teacher of German, Ancient Greek, and Latin in Braunschweig. He wrote the first German version of the rules of football and organized the arguably first-ever football match in Germany in 1874, between pupils of his school, the Martino-Katharineum. However, unlike in the film, Koch's original version of the rules of football, published in 1875, still closely resembled those of rugby football. In addition, Koch was actually a conservative himself and did not get into trouble with the authorities.
