= Family Card Games =

2009 video game

- Developer(s): Arc System Works
- Publisher(s): Aksys Games
- Platform(s): Wii (WiiWare)
- Release: JP: June 2, 2009; NA: November 11, 2009; EU: August 13, 2010
- Genre(s): Party
- Mode(s): Single-player, multiplayer

Family Card Games (Titled Okiraku Daifugō Wii (おきらく大富豪Wii) in Japan) is a video game developed by Arc System Works for the Wii. It was released as a WiiWare title in Japan on June 6, 2009, on November 11, 2009, in North America and on August 11, 2010, in PAL territories at a cost of 500 Wii Points. The game is the 7th in its series and brings an end to the long line of video games branded as Okiraku in Japan and Family games in North America and PAL territories, such as Family Table Tennis and Family Glide Hockey.

== Gameplay ==
Family Card Games features three different card games; Daifugo, Speed and Memory. The player controls one out of four different family members: Mommy, Daddy, Billy and Sarah. There are no differences between the characters except for their physical appearance. The game can be played against the computer in single player mode. Family Card Games also has a multiplayer mode which supports up to two-player local multiplayer and up to four-player online multiplayer (only when playing Daifugo) through WFC. You can also see where you rank globally through an online leaderboard. The game has downloadable content which can be uploaded through Nintendo's Pay & Play-service. You can download several different decks of cards. Each deck cost 100 Wii Points.

=== Daifugo ===
Daifugo is a well known Japanese card game. It's similar to the card game President. Essentially, Daifugo's a game of escalating values where you're always trying to play something stronger than the guy who played before you—going around the table and running through your cards until someone goes out and is declared the "Daifugo" or "Rich Man." The rich man then earns benefits in subsequent rounds, while the lower-placed players try to better their standing and draw themselves out of the hole. Daifugo is the only game featuring online connectivity. One can play up to four players online with random players. Online leaderboard is also supported.

=== Speed ===
Speed is a card game in which each player tries to get rid of all of his cards. Speed is a game associated with the card game Nertz. The game supports two-player local multiplayer and no online support, unlike Daifugo.

=== Memory ===
Memory is a card game in which all of the playing cards are laid face down on a surface and two cards are flipped face up over each turn. The object of the game is to turn over pairs of matching cards. This game supports up to two-player multiplayer, similar to Speed.

== Reception ==
Reception

Aggregate score
Aggregator	Score
GameRankings	43%

Review scores
Publication	Score
IGN	5/10
Nintendo Life	4/10
Official Nintendo Magazine	38%

Family Card Games released to generally unfavorable reviews. Reviewers criticised the lack of depth, quality and quantity of the games. However, some reviewers were positive to all the features included in Daifugo, even though they wished the two other card games would receive the same number of features. ONM said in their review that the video game was "three rubbish card games for just under a fiver". IGN's Lucas M. Thomas said that you should rather go buy a deck of cards for 99 cents instead of wasting 5 dollars on Family Card Games.
