= Xblaze =

Xblaze may refer to:

- Xblaze Code: Embryo, a visual novel published in 2013
- Xblaze Lost: Memories, its 2015 sequel
