= Family Mini Golf =

2009 video game

- Developer(s): Arc System Works
- Publisher(s): Aksys Games
- Platform(s): Wii (WiiWare)
- Release: JP: March 10, 2009; NA: June 22, 2009; PAL: April 2, 2010
- Genre(s): Sports
- Mode(s): Single-player, Multiplayer

Family Mini Golf (Okiraku Putter Golf in Japan) is a miniature golf video game developed by Arc System Works for WiiWare. It was released in Japan on March 10, 2009, in North America on June 22, 2009 and in the PAL region on April 2, 2010.

== Gameplay ==
Similar to Family Table Tennis and Family Glide Hockey, players control a member of a family, including a mother, father, son (Billy), and daughter (Sarah), to play against another in a round of mini golf.

The game features three, 9-hole courses, with an additional three available as paid downloadable content. Each 9 level pack is 200 Wii Points each. The game is 500 Wii Points itself so it's 1100 Wii Points in all.

== Reception ==
IGN called the game a "frustratingly un-fun effort", and were left confused by the controls which were at odds to the instructions in the game's operations manual. However, Nintendo Life found no apparent issue, praising their simplicity as well as the design of the courses, and thought the game excelled in multiplayer.
