= Monyu =

Monyu may refer to:

- Monyü, a festival in India
- Mon-Yu, a 2023 dungeon crawler video game
