= Aksys Games =

American video game publisher

Aksys Games Localization, Inc.
- Type: Video game publisher and localizer
- Industry: Video games
- Founded: July 14, 2006; 20 years ago
- Headquarters: Torrance, California
- Key people: Akibo Shieh (founder)
- Products: Video game console Arcade
- Website: www.aksysgames.com

Aksys Games Localization, Inc. is an American video game publisher that specializes in translating and localizing Japanese video games for English-speaking markets. It was founded by Akibo Shieh in 2006. Some of its clients include Bandai Namco Games, Xseed Games, and Atlus USA. Aksys Games is best known for its involvement in the Guilty Gear series, as well as for publishing numerous otome games in English. It has become a full-fledged game publisher with the announcement of Eagle Eye Golf for PlayStation 2, and has expressed a desire to publish for all current platforms from Microsoft, Nintendo, and Sony.

The company's name is coincidentally similar to Arc System Works, with whom it has a partnership. Despite their similar names, and the partnership between them, neither company owns the other. Aksys Games publishes many games for Arc System Works in North America, and has even assisted the latter in releasing the Bit.Trip series in Japan.

Aksys is also the North American distributor for the European publisher Rising Star Games. In addition, Aksys localized Nihon Falcom's role-playing game Tokyo Xanadu for the American market in 2017.

== Video games ==
=== Console games ===
==== PlayStation 2 ====
Title	First release	Developer(s)	Platform(s)
Eagle Eye Golf	October 10, 2006	Telenet Japan	PlayStation 2
Guilty Gear XX Accent Core	September 11, 2007	Arc System Works	PlayStation 2
Guilty Gear XX Accent Core Plus	April 7, 2009	Arc System Works	PlayStation 2

==== PlayStation 3 ====
Title	First release	Developer(s)	Platform(s)
BlazBlue: Calamity Trigger	June 30, 2009	Arc System Works	PlayStation 3
Battle Fantasia	December 22, 2009	Arc System Works	PlayStation 3 (PSN)
Record of Agarest War	April 27, 2010	Compile Heart, Red Entertainment	PlayStation 3 (PSN)
BlazBlue: Continuum Shift	July 27, 2010	Arc System Works	PlayStation 3
Arcana Heart 3	April 19, 2011	Arc System Works, Examu	PlayStation 3 (PSN)
Record of Agarest War Zero	June 14, 2011	Compile Heart, Red Entertainment	PlayStation 3
Record of Agarest War 2	June 26, 2012	Compile Heart, Red Entertainment	PlayStation 3
Crazy Strike Bowling	August 21, 2012	Corecell Technology	PlayStation 3 (PSN)
Bit.Trip Presents... Runner2: Future Legend of Rhythm Alien	March 5, 2013	Gaijin Games	PlayStation 3 (PSN)
Magus	February 25, 2014	Black Tower	PlayStation 3
BlazBlue: Chrono Phantasma	March 25, 2014	Arc System Works	PlayStation 3
Hakuoki: Stories of the Shinsengumi	May 6, 2014	Idea Factory	PlayStation 3
Xblaze Code: Embryo	June 24, 2014	Arc System Works	PlayStation 3
Arcana Heart 3: Love Max!!!!!	September 23, 2014	Arc System Works, Examu	PlayStation 3
Guilty Gear Xrd	December 16, 2014	Arc System Works	PlayStation 3
Under Night In-Birth Exe:Late	February 24, 2015	Ecole Software, French Bread	PlayStation 3
Tokyo Twilight Ghost Hunters	March 10, 2015	Arc System Works	PlayStation 3
BlazBlue: Chrono Phantasma Extend	June 30, 2015	Arc System Works	PlayStation 3
Xblaze Lost: Memories	August 11, 2015	Arc System Works	PlayStation 3
Aegis of Earth: Protonovus Assault	March 15, 2016	Acquire	PlayStation 3
Guilty Gear Xrd: Revelator	June 7, 2016	Arc System Works	PlayStation 3
BlazBlue: Central Fiction	November 1, 2016	Arc System Works	PlayStation 3
Guilty Gear Xrd: Rev 2	May 25, 2017	Arc System Works	PlayStation 3
Under Night In-Birth Exe:Late[st]	February 9, 2018	Ecole Software, French Bread	PlayStation 3

==== PlayStation 4 ====
Title	First release	Developer(s)	Platform(s)
Guilty Gear Xrd: Sign	December 16, 2014	Arc System Works	PlayStation 4
BlazBlue: Chrono Phantasma Extend	June 30, 2015	Arc System Works	PlayStation 4
Aegis of Earth: Protonovus Assault	March 15, 2016	Acquire	PlayStation 4
Chronicles of Teddy: Harmony of Exidus	March 29, 2016	LookAtMyGame	PlayStation 4 (PSN)
Guilty Gear Xrd: Revelator	June 7, 2016	Arc System Works	PlayStation 4
Tokyo Twilight Ghost Hunters	September 20, 2016	Arc System Works	PlayStation 4
Exist Archive: The Other Side of the Sky	October 18, 2016	Spike Chunsoft, tri-Ace	PlayStation 4
BlazBlue: Central Fiction	November 1, 2016	Arc System Works	PlayStation 4
Zero Escape: The Nonary Games	March 24, 2017	Spike Chunsoft	PlayStation 4
Guilty Gear Xrd: Rev 2	May 25, 2017	Arc System Works	PlayStation 4
Zero Time Dilemma	August 18, 2017	Spike Chunsoft	PlayStation 4
School Girl/Zombie Hunter	November 17, 2017	Tamsoft	PlayStation 4
Tokyo Xanadu eX+	December 8, 2017	Falcom	PlayStation 4
Under Night In-Birth Exe:Late[st]	February 8, 2018	Ecole Software, French Bread	PlayStation 4
Code:Realize ~Bouquet of Rainbows~	March 30, 2018	Otomate	PlayStation 4
Little Dragons Café	June 29, 2018	Toybox Inc.	PlayStation 4
Death Mark	October 31, 2018	Experience Inc.	PlayStation 4
Code:Realize ~Wintertide Miracles~	February 14, 2019	Otomate, Idea Factory	PlayStation 4
Spirit Hunter: NG	October 10, 2019	Experience Inc.	PlayStation 4
Ghost Parade	October 31, 2019	Lentera Nusantara Studio	PlayStation 4
Under Night In-Birth Exe:Late[cl-r]	February 20, 2020	Ecole Software, French Bread	PlayStation 4
Tin & Kuna	September 9, 2020	Black River Studios., Inc.	PlayStation 4
Undernauts: Labyrinth of Yomi	October 28, 2021	Experience Inc.	PlayStation 4
RICO London	December 9, 2021	Ground Shatter	PlayStation 4
Miss Kobayashi's Dragon Maid: Burst Forth!! Choro-gon Breath	August 25, 2022	Kaminari Games	PlayStation 4
Inescapable: No Rules, No Rescue	October 19, 2023	Dreamloop Games	PlayStation 4
Blazing Strike	October 17, 2024	RareBreed Makes Games	PlayStation 4

==== PlayStation 5 ====
Title	First release	Developer(s)	Platform(s)
Undernauts: Labyrinth of Yomi	August 11, 2022	Experience Inc.	PlayStation 5
Mon-Yu	September 21, 2023	Experience Inc.	PlayStation 5
Inescapable: No Rules, No Rescue	October 19, 2023	Dreamloop Games	PlayStation 5
Spirit Hunter: Death Mark II	February 15, 2024	Experience Inc.	PlayStation 5
Raging Bytes	June 27, 2023	Kemco	PlayStation 5
Ed-0: Zombie Uprising	July 13, 2023	Lancarse	PlayStation 5
Tales from Toyotoki: Arrival of the Witch	August 22, 2024	Kemco	PlayStation 5
Blazing Strike	October 17, 2024	RareBreed Makes Games	PlayStation 5
Yeah! You Want "Those Games," Right? So Here You Go! Now, Let's See You Clear Them! 1+2	December 19, 2024	Monkey Craft	PlayStation 5
C.A.R.D.S. RPG The Misty Battlefield	December 4, 2025	Acquire	PlayStation 5

==== Wii ====
Title	First release	Developer(s)	Platform(s)
Hooked! Real Motion Fishing	October 30, 2007	SIMS	Wii
Guilty Gear XX Accent Core	November 15, 2007	Arc System Works	Wii
MiniCopter: Adventure Flight	April 11, 2008	Sonic Powered	Wii
River City Ransom	April 21, 2008	Technos	Wii (Virtual Console)
Double Dragon	April 28, 2008	Technos	Wii (Virtual Console)
Renegade	May 5, 2008	Technos	Wii (Virtual Console)
Castle of Shikigami III	May 13, 2008	Alfa System	Wii
Family Table Tennis	May 26, 2008	Arc System Works	Wii (WiiWare)
Super Dodge Ball	September 22, 2008	Technos	Wii (Virtual Console)
Family Glide Hockey	January 19, 2009	Arc System Works	Wii (WiiWare)
Bit.Trip Beat	March 16, 2009	Gaijin Games	Wii (WiiWare)
Family Pirate Party	May 11, 2009	Arc System Works	Wii (WiiWare)
Guilty Gear XX Accent Core Plus	May 12, 2009	Arc System Works	Wii
Family Mini Golf	June 22, 2009	Arc System Works	Wii (WiiWare)
Bit.Trip Core	July 6, 2009	Gaijin Games	Wii (WiiWare)
Family Slot Car Racing	August 17, 2009	Arc System Works	Wii (WiiWare)
Crash 'n the Boys: Street Challenge	September 14, 2009	Technos	Wii (Virtual Console)
Family Tennis	September 21, 2009	Arc System Works	Wii (WiiWare)
Family Card Games	November 2, 2009	Arc System Works	Wii (WiiWare)
Hooked! Again: Real Motion Fishing	November 3, 2009	SIMS Co., Ltd.	Wii
The Combatribes	November 20, 2009	Technos	Wii (Virtual Console)
Bit.Trip Void	November 23, 2009	Gaijin Games	Wii (WiiWare)
Family Go-Kart Racing	February 22, 2010	Arc System Works	Wii (WiiWare)
Bit.Trip Runner	May 17, 2010	Gaijin Games	Wii (WiiWare)
Deer Captor	August 2, 2010	Arc System Works	Wii (WiiWare)
Bit.Trip Fate	October 25, 2010	Gaijin Games	Wii (WiiWare)
Derby Dogs	November 15, 2010	SIMS Co., Ltd.	Wii (WiiWare)
Bit.Trip Complete	September 13, 2011	Gaijin Games	Wii

==== Wii U ====
Title	First release	Developer(s)	Platform(s)
Chronicles of Teddy: Harmony of Exidus	March 31, 2016	LookAtMyGame	Wii U (eShop)

==== Nintendo Switch ====
Title	First release	Developer(s)	Platform(s)	
Little Dragons Café	June 29, 2018	Toybox Inc.	Nintendo Switch	
Death Mark	October 31, 2018	Experience Inc.	Nintendo Switch	
FUN! FUN! Animal Park	March 28, 2019	Nippon Columbia	Nintendo Switch	
Spirit Hunter: NG	October 10, 2019	Experience Inc.	Nintendo Switch	
Ghost Parade	October 31, 2019	Lentera Nusantara Studio	Nintendo Switch	
Fishing Star! World Tour	November 14, 2019	WFS, Inc.	Nintendo Switch	
Waku Waku Sweets	December 5, 2019	Sonic Powered	Nintendo Switch	
Deadly Premonition Origins	December 12, 2019	Marvelous Inc., Toybox Inc.	Nintendo Switch	
Code: Realize − Guardian of Rebirth	February 6, 2020	Idea Factory	Nintendo Switch	
Under Night In-Birth Exe:Late[cl-r]	February 20, 2020	Ecole Software, French Bread	Nintendo Switch	
Code: Realize ~Future Blessings~	April 23, 2020	Idea Factory	Nintendo Switch	
Collar × Malice	June 25, 2020	Idea Factory	Nintendo Switch	
Collar × Malice -Unlimited-	August 2020	Idea Factory	Nintendo Switch	
Tin & Kuna	September 10, 2020	Black River Studios., Inc.	Nintendo Switch	
Piofiore: Fated Memories	October 8, 2020	Idea Factory, Design Factory	Nintendo Switch	
Café Enchanté	November 5, 2020	Idea Factory, Design Factory	Nintendo Switch	
Pretty Princess Party	December 3, 2020	Nippon Columbia	Nintendo Switch	
Code: Realize ~Wintertide Miracles~	February 25, 2021	Idea Factory, Design Factory	Nintendo Switch	
Fishing Fighters: The Master of Mizugami Lands	May 27, 2021	Lategra	Nintendo Switch	
Olympia Soirée	September 9, 2021	Idea Factory	Nintendo Switch	
Undernauts: Labyrinth of Yomi	October 28, 2021	Experience Inc.	Nintendo Switch	
Pups & Purrs Animal Hospital	November 11, 2021	Nippon Columbia	Nintendo Switch	
Dairoku: Agents of Sakuratani	December 2, 2021	Idea Factory	Nintendo Switch	
RICO London	December 9, 2021	Ground Shatter	Nintendo Switch	
Variable Barricade	February 24, 2022	Idea Factory, Design Factory	Nintendo Switch	
Horgihugh and Friends	June 16, 2022	PiXEL	Nintendo Switch	
Miss Kobayashi's Dragon Maid: Burst Forth!! Choro-gon Breath	August 25, 2022	Kaminari Games	Nintendo Switch	
Piofiore: Episodio 1926	September 22, 2022	Idea Factory, Design Factory	Nintendo Switch	
Paradigm Paradox	October 27, 2022	Idea Factory	Nintendo Switch	
Lover Pretend	December 1, 2022	Idea Factory, Design Factory	Nintendo Switch	
Cuddly Forest Friends	February 2, 2023	Nippon Columbia	Nintendo Switch	
Norn9: Var Commons	March 30, 2023	Idea Factory	Nintendo Switch	
Spooky Spirit Shooting Gallery	April 27, 2023	Nippon Columbia	Nintendo Switch	
Winter's Wish: Spirits of Edo	May 18, 2023	Idea Factory	Nintendo Switch	
Jack Jeanne	June 15, 2023	Broccoli	Nintendo Switch	
Pretty Princess Magical Garden Island	June 22, 2023	Nippon Columbia	Nintendo Switch	
Radiant Tale	July 27, 2023	Idea Factory	Nintendo Switch	
Pups & Purrs Pet Shop	August 10, 2023	Nippon Columbia	Nintendo Switch	
Norn9: Last Era	August 31, 2023	Idea Factory	Nintendo Switch	
Mon-Yu	September 21, 2023	Experience, Inc.	Nintendo Switch	
Virche Evermore -ErroR: Salvation-	November 9, 2023	Idea Factory	Nintendo Switch	
Tengoku Struggle -Strayside-	April 4, 2024	Idea Factory	Nintendo Switch	
C.A.R.D.S. RPG The Misty Battlefield	May 22, 2024	Acquire	Nintendo Switch	
Radiant Tale -Fanfare!-	June 27, 2024	Idea Factory	Nintendo Switch	
Tokyo Xanadu eX+	July 25, 2024	Nihon Falcom	Nintendo Switch	
Tales from Toyotoki: Arrival of the Witch	August 22, 2024	Kemco	Nintendo Switch	
Fitness Boxing feat. HATSUNE MIKU	September 5, 2024	Imagineer	Nintendo Switch	
Blazing Strike	October 17, 2024	RareBreed Makes Games	Nintendo Switch	
Virche Evermore -EpiC: Lycoris-	November 7, 2024	Idea Factory	Nintendo Switch	
Zero to Dance Hero	November 21, 2024	Imagineer	Nintendo Switch	
Despera Drops	March 6, 2025	D3 Publisher	Nintendo Switch	
7'scarlet	May 15, 2025	Idea Factory, Toybox Inc.	Nintendo Switch	
Illusion of Itehari	September 18, 2025	Broccoli	Nintendo Switch	
The Good Old Days	October 23, 2025	GRAVITY Co., Ltd.	Nintendo Switch	
Mistonia's Hope -The Lost Delight-	November 13, 2025	Idea Factory	Nintendo Switch	
Path of Mystery: A Brush with Death	February 26, 2026	Imagineer/TOYBOX	Nintendo Switch	
Otome Daoshi: Fighting for Love	March 26, 2026	Idea Factory	Nintendo Switch	
Q Collection	May 21, 2026	liica, Inc.	Nintendo Switch	
Over Requiemz	August 20, 2026	Idea Factory, Kogado Studio	Nintendo Switch	
Another Eden Begins	September 17, 2026	Wright Flyer Studios	Nintendo Switch	Physical version
Tristia: Chronicles	September 17, 2026	Kogado Studio	Nintendo Switch	Collection of Tristia: Legacy and Tristia: Restore
Bounty Sisters	Fall 2026	Pixel Co.	Nintendo Switch	
Undergrounded	Fall 2026	Game Studio, round6	Nintendo Switch	
Cthulhu Mythos Adventures	Late 2026	Gotcha Gotcha Games	Nintendo Switch	
Illusion of Itehari -trail-	Spring 2027	Broccoli	Nintendo Switch	
Olympia Soiree -Catharsis-	Spring 2027	Idea Factory	Nintendo Switch	

==== Nintendo Switch 2 ====
Title	First release	Developer(s)	Platform(s)	Notes
Another Eden Begins	September 17, 2026	Wright Flyer Studios	Nintendo Switch 2	Physical version

==== Xbox 360 ====
Title	First release	Developer(s)	Platform(s)
Battle Fantasia	September 16, 2008	Arc System Works	Xbox 360
Guilty Gear 2: Overture	October 7, 2008	Arc System Works	Xbox 360
BlazBlue: Calamity Trigger	June 30, 2009	Arc System Works	Xbox 360
0-D Beat Drop	November 11, 2009	Cyclone Zero	Xbox 360 (XBLA)
Record of Agarest War	April 27, 2010	Compile Heart, Red Entertainment	Xbox 360
DeathSmiles	June 28, 2010	Cave	Xbox 360
BlazBlue: Continuum Shift	July 27, 2010	Arc System Works	Xbox 360
Record of Agarest War Zero	June 14, 2011	Compile Heart, Red Entertainment	Xbox 360
Bit.Trip Presents... Runner2: Future Legend of Rhythm Alien	February 27, 2013	Gaijin Games	Xbox 360 (XBLA)
A.R.E.S: Extinction Agenda EX	October 2, 2013	Extend Studio	Xbox 360 (XBLA)

==== Xbox One ====
Title	First release	Developer(s)	Platform(s)
BlazBlue: Chrono Phantasma Extend	June 30, 2015	Arc System Works	Xbox One
Tin & Kuna	September 9, 2020	Black River Studios., Inc.	Xbox One
Undernauts: Labyrinth of Yomi	October 27, 2021	Experience Inc.	Xbox One
RICO London	April 27, 2022	Ground Shatter	Xbox One
Inescapable: No Rules, No Rescue	October 18, 2023	Dreamloop Games	Xbox One

==== Xbox Series X|S ====
Title	First release	Developer(s)	Platform(s)
Inescapable: No Rules, No Rescue	October 18, 2023	Dreamloop Games	Xbox Series X|S

=== Portable games ===
==== Nintendo DS ====
Title	First release	Developer(s)	Platform(s)
Hoshigami: Ruining Blue Earth Remix	June 25, 2007	Barnhouse Effect	Nintendo DS
Super Dodgeball Brawlers	May 27, 2008	Arc System Works	Nintendo DS
Jake Hunter: Detective Chronicles	June 11, 2008	WorkJam	Nintendo DS
From the Abyss	August 26, 2008	Sonic Powered	Nintendo DS
Theresia	October 30, 2008	WorkJam	Nintendo DS
Princess on Ice	November 5, 2008	Arc System Works	Nintendo DS
Jake Hunter Detective Story: Memories of the Past	May 26, 2009	WorkJam	Nintendo DS
Rockin' Pretty	July 20, 2009	Arc System Works	Nintendo DS
Squeeballs Party	October 12, 2009	Eiconic Games	Nintendo DS
Hero's Saga Laevatein Tactics	October 20, 2009	GungHo Online Entertainment	Nintendo DS
Animal Puzzle Adventure	January 4, 2010	Arc System Works	Nintendo DSi (DSiWare)
Jazzy Billiards	January 11, 2010	Arc System Works	Nintendo DSi (DSiWare)
World Cup Of Pool	February 12, 2010	Midas Interactive Entertainment	Nintendo DS
Don't Cross the Line	June 7, 2010	Jupiter	Nintendo DSi (DSiWare)
River City Soccer Hooligans	June 10, 2010	Arc System Works	Nintendo DS
BlayzBloo: Super Melee Brawlers Battle Royale	August 2, 2010	Arc System Works	Nintendo DSi (DSiWare)
Everyday Soccer	September 20, 2010	Arc System Works	Nintendo DSi (DSiWare)
River City Super Sports Challenge	October 12, 2010	Million	Nintendo DS
999: Nine Hours, Nine Persons, Nine Doors	November 16, 2010	Chunsoft	Nintendo DS
Pro Jumper! Guilty Gear Tangent!?	June 23, 2011	Arc System Works	Nintendo DSi (DSiWare)
Defense of the Middle Kingdom	September 15, 2011	Arc System Works	Nintendo DSi (DSiWare)

==== Nintendo 3DS ====
Title	First release	Developer(s)	Platform(s)
BlazBlue: Continuum Shift II	May 31, 2011	Arc System Works	Nintendo 3DS
Bit.Trip Saga	September 13, 2011	Gaijin Games	Nintendo 3DS
Chase: Cold Case Investigations - Distant Memories	October 13, 2016	Arc System Works	Nintendo 3DS (eShop)
Double Dragon	October 20, 2011	Technos	Nintendo 3DS (Virtual Console)
Zero Escape: Virtue's Last Reward	October 23, 2012	Chunsoft	Nintendo 3DS
Hakuoki: Memories of the Shinsengumi	September 24, 2013	Idea Factory, Otomate	Nintendo 3DS
Shifting World	September 1, 2013	Fishing Cactus	Nintendo 3DS
Moco Moco Friends	November 17, 2015	Nippon Columbia	Nintendo 3DS
Family Fishing	November 19, 2015	Arc System Works	Nintendo 3DS (eShop)
Radiohammer	December 10, 2015	Arc System Works	Nintendo 3DS (eShop)
Slice It!	January 14, 2016	Arc System Works, Com2uS	Nintendo 3DS (eShop)
Langrisser Re:Incarnation Tensei	April 19, 2016	Career Soft, Masaya Games	Nintendo 3DS
Zero Time Dilemma	June 28, 2016	Spike Chunsoft	Nintendo 3DS
Creeping Terror	October 31, 2017	Sushi Typhoon Games, Mebius	Nintendo 3DS
Jake Hunter Detective Story: Ghost of the Dusk	September 28, 2018	Arc System Works	Nintendo 3DS

==== PlayStation Portable ====
Title	First release	Developer(s)	Platform(s)
Guilty Gear XX Accent Core Plus	April 7, 2009	Arc System Works	PlayStation Portable
BlazBlue: Calamity Trigger Portable	February 25, 2010	Arc System Works	PlayStation Portable
Cho Aniki Zero	March 25, 2010	extreme Co., Ltd.	PlayStation Portable (PSN)
Mimana Iyar Chronicle	March 30, 2010	Kogado Studio, Premium Agency	PlayStation Portable
Gladiator Begins	September 14, 2010	Goshow	PlayStation Portable
Blazing Souls Accelate	October 19, 2010	Neverland	PlayStation Portable
Jikandia: The Timeless Land	March 15, 2011	Opus Studio Inc.	PlayStation Portable
BlazBlue: Continuum Shift II	May 31, 2011	Arc System Works	PlayStation Portable
Fate/Extra	November 1, 2011	Type-Moon	PlayStation Portable
Hakuoki: Demon of the Fleeting Blossom	February 14, 2012	Idea Factory, Otomate	PlayStation Portable
Hakuoki: Warriors of the Shinsengumi	November 6, 2012	Idea Factory	PlayStation Portable
Ragnarok Tactics	February 19, 2013	GungHo Online Entertainment, Apollosoft, Chime	PlayStation Portable
Sweet Fuse: At Your Side	August 27, 2013	Idea Factory, Otomate, Comcept	PlayStation Portable

==== PlayStation Vita ====
Title	First release	Developer(s)	Platform(s)
Blazblue: Continuum Shift Extend	February 14, 2012	Arc System Works	PlayStation Vita
Zero Escape: Virtue's Last Reward	October 23, 2012	Chunsoft	PlayStation Vita
Muramasa Rebirth	June 25, 2013	Vanillaware	PlayStation Vita
Sorcery Saga: Curse of the Great Curry God	December 10, 2013	Compile Heart, ZeroDiv	PlayStation Vita
Mind Zero	May 27, 2014	Acquire, ZeroDiv	PlayStation Vita
BlazBlue: Chrono Phantasma	June 24, 2014	Arc System Works	PlayStation Vita
Xblaze Code: Embryo	June 24, 2014	Arc System Works	PlayStation Vita
Arcana Heart 3: Love Max!!!!	September 23, 2014	Examu	PlayStation Vita
Tokyo Twilight Ghost Hunters	March 10, 2015	Toybox Inc.	PlayStation Vita
BlazBlue: Chrono Phantasma Extend	July 28, 2015	Arc System Works	PlayStation Vita
Xblaze Lost: Memories	August 11, 2015	Arc System Works	PlayStation Vita
Code: Realize − Guardian of Rebirth	October 20, 2015	Otomate	PlayStation Vita
Norn9: Var Commons	November 10, 2015	Otomate	PlayStation Vita
Aegis of Earth: Protonovus Assault	March 15, 2016	Acquire	PlayStation Vita
Zero Escape: Zero Time Dilemma	June 28, 2016	Spike Chunsoft	PlayStation Vita
Shiren the Wanderer: The Tower of Fortune and the Dice of Fate	July 26, 2016	Spike Chunsoft	PlayStation Vita
Tokyo Twilight Ghost Hunters: Daybreak Special Gigs	September 20, 2016	Now Production	PlayStation Vita
Exist Archive: The Other Side of the Sky	October 18, 2016	Spike Chunsoft, tri-Ace	PlayStation Vita
Zero Escape: The Nonary Games	March 24, 2017	Spike Chunsoft	PlayStation Vita
Period: Cube ~Shackles of Amadeus~	April 28, 2017	Idea Factory	PlayStation Vita
Tokyo Xanadu	June 30, 2017	Falcom	PlayStation Vita
Ninja Usagimaru: Two Tails of Adventure	July 7, 2017	Arc System Works	PlayStation Vita
Under Night In-Birth Exe:Late[st]	July 20, 2017	Ecole Software, French Bread	PlayStation Vita
Collar × Malice	July 28, 2017	Idea Factory	PlayStation Vita
Drive Girls	September 8, 2017	Tamsoft	PlayStation Vita
Bad Apple Wars	October 3, 2017	Otomate, Idea Factory	PlayStation Vita
Code: Realize ~Future Blessings~	March 30, 2018	Idea Factory	PlayStation Vita
Psychedelica of the Black Butterfly	April 27, 2018	Otomate	PlayStation Vita
7'scarlet	May 25, 2018	Otomate	PlayStation Vita
Psychedelica of the Ashen Hawk	June 29, 2018	Otomate	PlayStation Vita
Death Mark	October 31, 2018	Experience Inc.	PlayStation Vita
Code:Realize ~Wintertide Miracles~	February 14, 2019	Otomate, Idea Factory	PlayStation Vita

==== iOS ====
Title	First release	Developer(s)	Platform(s)
Double Dragon iPhone	March 4, 2011	Brizo Interactive	iOS
Banshee's Last Cry	January 24, 2014	Spike Chunsoft	iOS
999: The Novel	March 17, 2014	Spike Chunsoft	iOS

=== PC games ===
==== Microsoft Windows ====
Title	First release	Developer(s)	Platform(s)
Xblaze Code: Embryo	March 2, 2016	Arc System Works	Microsoft Windows (Steam)
Mind Zero	March 8, 2016	Acquire, ZeroDiv	Microsoft Windows (Steam)
Aegis of Earth: Protonovus Assault	July 18, 2016	Acquire	Microsoft Windows (Steam)
Xblaze Lost: Memories	August 10, 2016	Arc System Works	Microsoft Windows (Steam)
Creeping Terror	October 31, 2017	Sushi Typhoon Games, Mebius	Microsoft Windows (Steam)
Tokyo Xanadu eX+	December 8, 2017	Falcom	Microsoft Windows (Steam)
Little Dragons Café	November 15, 2018	Toybox Inc.	Microsoft Windows (Steam)
Death Mark	April 4, 2019	Experience Inc.	Microsoft Windows (Steam)
Gabbuchi	July 18, 2019	h.a.n.d., Inc.	Microsoft Windows (Steam)
Spirit Hunter: NG	October 10, 2019	Experience Inc.	Microsoft Windows (Steam)
Ghost Parade	October 31, 2019	Lentera Nusantara Studio	Microsoft Windows (Steam)
Tin & Kuna	September 10, 2020	Black River Studios., Inc.	Microsoft Windows (Steam)
Undernauts: Labyrinth of Yomi	November 4, 2021	Experience Inc.	Microsoft Windows (Steam)
Mon-Yu	September 21, 2023	Experience Inc.	Microsoft Windows (Steam)
Inescapable: No Rules, No Rescue	October 19, 2023	Dreamloop Games	Microsoft Windows (Steam)
Spirit Hunter: Death Mark II	February 15, 2024	Experience Inc.	Microsoft Windows (Steam)
Blazing Strike	October 17, 2024	RareBreed Makes Games	Microsoft Windows (Steam)
