= 0-D Beat Drop =

2009 video game

- Developers: Cyclone Zero; JAMS SOFT
- Publishers: Aksys Games; Arc System Works
- Designer: Hiroyuki Masuno
- Platform: Xbox 360 (XBLA)
- Release: November 11, 2009
- Genres: Puzzle game, rhythm game
- Modes: Single-player, multiplayer

0-D Beat Drop is a 2009 rhythm-puzzle video game developed by Cyclone Zero and JAMS SOFT and published by Aksys Games and Arc System Works. With elements of Puyo Puyo and Lumines, the game has players organizing colored shapes onto a playing field in order to match three pieces and clear them using the game's titular Beat Drop, which requires the player to listen to the techno soundtrack. It also sponsored a Japanese K-pop band Sweat Vacation and the difficulty for this game was added based on it.

== Gameplay ==
0-D Beat Drop is designed as combat puzzle game for two or more players. As the players match up differently shaped pieces in various colors, a group of blocks is stored in the bank. When a chain is completed, a certain number of pieces fall down on the opponent's playing field. The pieces drop from the top of the screen, and they need to be placed so that the colors match. Matches formed from three consecutive colors can be vertical, horizontal, or go around angles.

For a block to form a match, it has to be dropped within the beat of the techno track in the background. A meter on the side of the screen helps the players keep track of the current beat, and if the pieces are dropped while the meter is in the scoring zone, it will allow the blocks to be destroyed. Doing so for a successive chain of blocks increases the score multiplier, while also making the scoring zone on the meter smaller.

0-D Beat Drop consists of 6 game modes: Planet Quest, Co-Op, Survival Four, Time Attack, Task and Multiplayer. One of the features of the game is the Beat-O-Matic, which can analyze music from a USB drive or the 360 hard drive, determine its BPM, and sync the game with it.

== Reception ==
Reception

Aggregate score
Aggregator	Score
Metacritic	80/100

Review scores
Publication	Score
IGN	8.5/10
Official Xbox Magazine (US)	8/10
TeamXbox	8.3/10

0-D Beat Drop received "favorable" reviews according to the review aggregation website Metacritic.

Since its release, the game sold 2,311 units worldwide by January 2011. Sales moved up to 2,618 units by the end of 2011.
