= Spirit Hunter: NG =

2018 video game

- Cover art for the international release
- Developer: Experience
- Publishers: JP: Experience; WW: Aksys Games
- Director: Motoya Ataka
- Producer: Hajime Chikami
- Designers: Yuuki Miura; Tomohiro Kokubu
- Artists: Fumiya Sumio; Kera; Kazuhiro Oya
- Writers: Kunimitsu Kobayashi; Satoru Okano; Makoto Obara; Kyo Yahagi; Ryoko Seki
- Composer: Naoaki Jimbo
- Series: Spirit Hunter
- Platforms: PlayStation Vita; PlayStation 4; Microsoft Windows; Nintendo Switch
- Release: September 13, 2018: PlayStation Vita; JP: September 13, 2018; WW: October 10, 2019 PlayStation 4; JP: February 21, 2019; WW: October 10, 2019 Microsoft Windows; WW: October 10, 2019 Nintendo Switch; WW: October 10, 2019; JP: May 21, 2020
- Genres: Horror Adventure, visual novel
- Mode: Single-player

Spirit Hunter: NG, (Note: Released in Japan as simply NG) short for No Good, is a 2018 horror visual novel adventure game developed by Experience. It is the second entry in their Spirit Hunter series, following 2017's Spirit Hunter: Death Mark, and is followed in turn by Spirit Hunter: Death Mark II. The game was originally released for the PlayStation Vita, and has since been ported to the PlayStation 4, Microsoft Windows, and Nintendo Switch.

In the game, the player investigates haunted locations, searching for clues relating to spirits, aiming to purify or destroy the spirit. The investigations are carried out together with partner characters, who the protagonist can form bonds with. The game was directed by Motoya Ataka, produced by Hajime Chikami, and designed by Yuuki Miura and Tomohiro Kokubu, and was developed to contrast with the previous game in the series in terms of its writing and protagonist, with gradually introduced horror and a hot-blooded player character. Critics praised the game for its story, characterization, and visuals, and considered it a good game for fans of Asian horror.

== Gameplay ==
Spirit Hunter: NG is a visual novel adventure game in which the player, in hunting spirits, investigates haunted locations, searching for clues related to their current case in a point-and-click adventure manner. At certain points, the player goes through "crisis choice" segments, where they must make a series of correct decisions with a set amount of time to escape from a pursuer; if they fail, they are taken back to the beginning of the segment and given the chance to retry it. At other times, they can gain information through the use the protagonist's "bloodmetry" ability, where they touch bloodstains to receive visions of events relating to the person the blood is from. During investigations, the player also has access to an optional series of side quests, where the protagonist receives text messages prompting the player to search for cards hidden in objects described in the messages.

When confronting the current spirit in a boss battle, the player makes use of items they have found during their investigation; item descriptions and entries in the protagonist's journal are used to determine what to do. The battle has different possible outcomes: if the player purifies the spirit, their partner is freed from spiritual shackles, whereas if they destroy the spirit, the spirit's curse is moved onto the player's partner, killing them. The player forms bonds with the protagonist's partners by talking to them, and by reacting to things they say through the "judging" mechanic.

== Development ==
Spirit Hunter: NG was developed by Experience, and was directed by Motoya Ataka, produced by Hajime Chikami, and designed by Yuuki Miura and Tomohiro Kokubu. It was written by Kunimitsu Kobayashi, Satoru Okano, Makoto Obara, Kyo Yahagi, and Ryoko Seki, with character designs by Fumiya Sumio, spirit designs by Kera, and concept art by Kazuhiro Oya, and with audio by Naoaki Jimbo.

In trying to get the right mood for the game, the developers looked through tens of thousands of pieces of concept art when looking for artists to recruit to the team, and played through each chapter multiple times, re-creating them from scratch when they did not match their vision. In contrast to the previous game's amnesiac, middle-aged protagonist who suddenly gets thrown into a dangerous situation, NG was written with a hot-blooded student protagonist who acts impulsively, and with a situation that is gradually introduced and worsens. The game was designed to depict horror in every-day life, which was reflected in the type of locations the player visits, compared to the previous game's psychic spots.

The game was announced in April 2018 through Famitsu, and was released in Japan by Experience for the PlayStation Vita on September 13, 2018 following a delay from August 9, with a PlayStation 4 port following on February 21, 2019. Aksys Games released the game internationally on October 10, 2019, for the PlayStation Vita, PlayStation 4, Nintendo Switch, and Microsoft Windows. Experience released the Nintendo Switch version in Japan on May 21, 2020.

== Reception ==
Reception

Aggregate score
| Aggregator | Score |
|---|---|
| Metacritic | NS: 73/100 |

Review scores
| Publication | Score |
|---|---|
| Famitsu | 32/40 |
| Nintendo Life | 7/10 |
| RPGFan | 90% |
| Digitally Downloaded | 5/5 |

Spirit Hunter: NG was well received, and was considered a step up from the previous entry in the series by critics. The game was featured as one of TouchArcade's SwitchArcade Highlights, and as one of The Dallas Morning News' recommended horror games to play during Halloween, specifically recommending it to fans of Asian horror stories like Ju-On: The Grudge and Ring.

Critics liked the game's writing and characterization; the characters were considered impactful, likable, interesting and distinct, with relatable issues, and the sympathy shown for the spirits, with the player having to get to know them, was well received. Famitsu appreciated the gradual introduction of the horror, which drew them into the story, but found the story's pacing to be dissatisfying at times.

The gameplay mechanics and user interface were considered accessible and convenient, and a step up from the previous game, although Famitsu found certain scenes too hard to fully understand, forcing them into brute-forcing their way through them by trying every action they have available; on the other hand, RPGFan found the game too forgiving. The new "judging" gameplay mechanic, which lets the player react to other characters, was appreciated for how it lets the player form bonds with the cast.

The graphics and visuals were well received, with Digitally Downloaded calling the game a "visual masterpiece", although with "minimal" animation. Praise was aimed at the environments and atmosphere, and the character and monster designs; Famitsu particularly considered the death scenes impactful and a highlight. The audio was criticized by RPGFan for having several reused tracks from the previous game in the series.

Neither of the PlayStation Vita and PlayStation 4 versions appeared on Media Create's weekly Japanese top 20 sales charts during their debut weeks, meaning they sold less than 3,569 and 2,724 physical copies each, respectively, during that time period.
