= Jikandia: The Timeless Land =

2010 video game

- North American packaging artwork
- Developer: Opus Studio
- Publishers: JP: Idea Factory; NA: Aksys Games
- Platform: PlayStation Portable
- Release: JP: July 8, 2010; NA: March 15, 2011
- Genre: Action role-playing
- Modes: Single-player, multiplayer

Jikandia: The Timeless Land (Note: Japanese: ジカンデファンタジア, Hepburn: Jikan De Fantasia; lit. Time in Fantasia) is an action role-playing game developed by Opus Studio and Idea Factory for the PlayStation Portable. It was published in Japan by Idea Factory on July 8, 2010, and in North America by Aksys Games on March 15, 2011.

The game tasks players with reuniting their fellow schoolmates and fighting off the evil of the land in the fantasy realm of Jikandia through a series of procedurally generated dungeons. The game featured a novel gameplay concept of allowing the player to set the time limit for their experience in a dungeon, ranging from 3 to 30 minutes— longer time periods mean the player can earn better rewards, but incur more risk. Critical reception to Jikandia was mixed; reviewers generally believed that it was not as good as their previous game, Half-Minute Hero, and that only genre fans would likely enjoy it.

== Gameplay ==
The game follows a group of nine schoolmates, that are teleported into the realm of "Jikandia" and must fight the evil of the land. Upon being teleported, the friends are separated, and it is up to the player to reunite them and to defeat the enemies. The player repeatedly enters procedurally-generated dungeons where they must set a time limit for themselves (ranging from 3 to 30 minutes) that decides the level of rewards they can receive. The longer a player stays in a dungeon (and survives the experience), the better the rewards they can earn. Each dungeon that the player clears earns a new friend that can fight with the main player; after rescuing them, the player can bring up to two of these friends to fight with them in future dungeons. Each friend has different strengths and weaknesses, introducing strategic decisions that the player must consider.

== Development ==
Idea Factory contacted Opus Studio to develop a game because of their experience with Half-Minute Hero, and Opus was interested in creating a game that could be finished in the time of a normal Japanese train commute. Opus noticed that there was a trend of side-scrolling video games like Shadow Complex and Bionic Commando which helped them decide the genre of the title; Idea Factory was supportive because it was outside the normal genres that they published (tactical role-playing games and games targeting women) and represented an opportunity to grow their customer base. Opus included the game's customizable time limit mechanic to try to give clear incentives and disadvantages to players for whatever time they selected for a particular level.

Jikandia was noted to use a similar timer mechanic as Half-Minute Hero. Developers from the studio replied that they believed time was "important to everyone" and "a fun theme" in explaining why their games featured it as a significant part of gameplay, also stating that they wished their own development would stay within the timeframe they set for it.

== Reception ==
Reception

Aggregate score
Aggregator	Score
Metacritic	60/100

Review scores
Publication	Score
GamesRadar+	3/5
IGN	5.5/10
RPGFan	68/100

The game received an aggregate score of 60/100 on Metacritic, indicating mixed or average reviews. IGN's Daemon Hatfield rated the game 5.5/10, saying that it "puts us in control of how long it takes to complete a level, but it doesn't give us a reason to stay any longer than we have to." RPGFan's Joe Czop rated it 68/100, saying that he would only recommend it to the "most rabid fans of the subgenre of parody RPGs with experimental twists", and comparing it unfavorably with Half-Minute Hero.

Heidi Kemps of GamesRadar+ rated Jikandia 3/5 stars, feeling that it was "destined to spend an eternity as a very niche appeal title" because of its flawed time mechanic. MTV's Jason Cipriano sounded a more positive note, praising the game's novel time mechanic and its blend of old and new formats, while criticizing the game's hard-to-read story elements and its at time tough to follow paths forward. Jenni Lada of Siliconera praised Jikandia in a preview, calling it intriguing, and its script clever and funny, but criticized its text box as moving too slowly and making it too easy to miss dialog.
