= Spirit Hunter: Death Mark =

2017 video game

- Cover art for the international release
- Developer: Experience
- Publishers: JP: Experience; WW: Aksys Games
- Director: Motoya Ataka
- Producer: Hajime Chikami
- Artists: Rui Tomono; Fumiya Sumio
- Composer: Naoaki Jimbo
- Platforms: Nintendo Switch; PlayStation Vita; PlayStation 4; Microsoft Windows; Xbox One
- Release: June 1, 2017: PlayStation Vita; JP: June 1, 2017; WW: October 31, 2018 PlayStation 4; JP: January 18, 2018; WW: October 31, 2018 Nintendo Switch; JP: June 28, 2018; WW: October 31, 2018 Xbox One; JP: October 25, 2018 Microsoft Windows; WW: April 4, 2019
- Genres: Horror Adventure, visual novel
- Mode: Single-player

Spirit Hunter: Death Mark (Note: Known in Japan as Shiin (死印; "Death Mark")) is a horror visual novel adventure game developed and published by Experience, and is the first entry in the Spirit Hunter (Note: Known in Japan as Shinrei Horror (心霊ホラー, Shinrei Horā; "Spirit Horror")) series. It was originally released in June 2017 for PlayStation Vita in Japan, and was later ported to PlayStation 4, Nintendo Switch and Xbox One. The game was published worldwide by Aksys Games in October 2018 for the same platforms except Xbox One, and was additionally released for Microsoft Windows in both English and Japanese in April 2019. It is followed by two sequels: 2018's Spirit Hunter: NG, and 2022's Spirit Hunter: Death Mark II.

The game was directed by Motoya Ataka and produced by Hajime Chikami, with art by Rui Tomono and Fumiya Sumio, and music by Naoaki Jimbo. It was well received by critics.

== Gameplay ==
The player investigates areas in a first-person perspective, aiming to eliminate spirits.

Spirit Hunter: Death Mark is a first-person visual novel adventure game in which the player investigates areas, and clears each of the game's chapters by eliminating a spirit.

The story is told in standard visual novel format, while the investigative aspects of the game are done in adventure game format with puzzle solving and item collecting. The game also includes some mild survival aspects as the player is given a health bar in the form of a "Spirit Power" meter which can filled past its initial fill by collecting talismans.

Occasionally the player will be given a challenge in the form of a timed choice in which the amount of time they have to answer a question is determined by how much Spirit Power they have, if the player answers incorrectly they will lose Spirit Power and losing all of it will result in a game over.

Near the end of a chapter; during a confrontation with an enemy spirit, the player character must defend themselves in a turn-based battle. The player is accompanied by another mark bearer during this battle and are allowed to use two different items per turn. Depending on the outcome of the battle the spirit will either be saved or destroyed which in turn affects the outcome of the chapter. If the spirit is properly purified then none of the mark bearers are killed, if the spirit is not purified then one of the mark bearers aside from the protagonist may be killed and the story will continue without them.

== Plot ==
The story is set in H City, Tokyo, where it follows an amnesiac, player-named man whose default name is Kazuo Yashiki. In the beginning of the game, Yashiki notices that he carries a scar on his arm, called the Mark, which according to rumors is caused by curses or contact with ghosts, and will lead to its bearer's death at dawn. After noticing the Mark, he blanks out, and finds himself in front of Kujou Mansion, where he finds its owner, Saya Kujou, dead. Kujou also bore the Mark, and had researched it, but died before finding a solution.

In the first chapter, "Hanahiko", Yashiki meets the sentient doll Mary in the mansion, who gives advice on the Mark, as well as two Mark bearers who had been drawn to the mansion: the occult-loving high school student Moe Watanabe, and the elementary school student Tsukasa Yoshida. Believing that they got the Mark from trespassing in the abandoned H Elementary School, they go there to investigate, and join with ex-detective Satoru Mashita, who also investigates the school and carries the Mark. They learn of the vengeful spirit of Hanahiko, an orphaned boy who was subject to child abuse by the school's principal for liking to wear skirts and makeup, and who as a spirit killed the school's staff. The group calms the spirit with Hanahiko's mother's lipstick, a keepsake from when Hanahiko was alive, which absolves everyone's Mark except Yashiki's; Mary believes Yashiki's to be from another spirit, although it is weakened, allowing him to live a while longer.

In the second chapter, "Shimi-O," another Mark bearer, the young delinquent Shou Nagashima, arrives at the mansion. He believes he got his mark from a "huge man" he encountered when his bike broke down outside of H Forest. Mary believes this huge man is Shimi-O, the spotted man of the woods. According to the rumors, he kills people with a massive drill and turns their bodies into beehives. Yashiki and either Shou or Mashita, who has stayed behind to help Yashiki, head to the forest to investigate. They encounter an enraged man named Masao Kimura whom they manage to calm down. They also find a series of cabins with notes about the "Honey Bee Family" cult, and corpses with holes drilled into them. Hiding inside one of these cabins is Christie Amamura, a journalist who was involved in a scandal and came out to the woods to kill herself. But after encountering Shimi-O, she became scared and joined up with Yashiki and his partner. The group was forced to flee the forest, narrowly escaping a deadly encounter with Shimi-O. Due to this encounter, Mashita's mark returned once more. The group learns that Shimi-O was the leader of the Honey Bee Family cult, who all participated in mass suicide in the forest. However, he survived, and became a vengeful, lonely spirit. Yashiki and his partner are able to put Shimi-O's spirit to rest by giving him a poisionous root covered in honey, killing him and allowing him to be reunited with his "family." Mashita and Shou's marks vanish after this, but Yashiki and Christie's marks remain, meaning that Shimi-O was not the spirit who cursed them.

== Development ==
Spirit Hunter: Death Mark was developed by Experience, and was directed by Motoya Ataka and produced by Hajime Chikami, with illustrations and concept art by Rui Tomono and Fumiya Sumio, and music by Naoaki Jimbo. Experience had previously mostly created dungeon crawler role-playing video games, and initially intended for Death Mark to be one as well, and tried out battle systems and hack-and-slash elements early in production. They did however see the opportunity to create another "pillar" for their studio and broaden their audience by creating it in the form of an adventure game instead, and saw the horror and role-playing game aspects as contrasting, preferring to focus on the horror than to create a mix of the two. Major influences for the game included supposedly haunted places and deserted areas in cities, and the spirits were based on urban legends and historical events.

The game was first announced with a teaser trailer and website in December 2016, and unveiled the following month. It was released for the PlayStation Vita by Experience on June 1, 2017. PlayStation 4 and Nintendo Switch ports were announced in October 2017, with higher graphic resolutions, and with a new gallery feature and the new episode "Urban Legend: Little Red Riding Hood of the Rain", which was also released as downloadable content for the PlayStation Vita version. The PlayStation 4 version was released on January 18, 2018, and the Nintendo Switch version on June 28, 2018. An Xbox One version followed on October 25, 2018.

Aksys Games announced at Anime Expo 2018 that they would localize the game and release it in North America and Europe for Nintendo Switch, PlayStation 4 and PlayStation Vita, and released it both digitally and physically for those platforms on October 31, 2018. In addition to the standard release, the game was available in a limited edition including an artbook, a soundtrack CD, a slipcase, and a temporary tattoo of the fatal Mark. Aksys Games also released a Microsoft Windows version on April 4, 2019, in both English and Japanese. They chose it for localization after internal playing and evaluation, considering it a perfect fit for them due to the horror themes and it being an interactive adventure game.

In April 2025, additional DLC was announced by Aksys Games for the Switch version of the game, which serves as the 7th chapter. It was originally released in Japan in August 2024.

== Reception ==
Reception

Aggregate score
Aggregator	Score
Metacritic	PS4: 83/100; NS: 77/100

Review scores
Publication	Score
Electronic Gaming Monthly	8/10
Famitsu	7/8/8/8 (Note: Each of the four reviewers in Famitsu scored the game on a ten point scale)
Nintendo Life	8/10
RPGFan	85%
Digitally Downloaded	4.5/5

Spirit Hunter: Death Mark was well received by critics, according to the review aggregator platform Metacritic. The game was described by game publications as one of the best Nintendo Switch horror games one of the best horror visual novels, and among the best visual novels on the Nintendo Switch. It won Digitally Downloaded's 2018 silver game of the year award in multiple categories, and was included in a PC Gamer feature about "exciting gems" on Steam.

Famitsu appreciated the game's atmosphere, typical of Japanese horror films, and how the gameplay made the game accessible to players who are not good at action games.

=== Sales ===
The PlayStation Vita version of the game was the eighth best selling physical video game in Japan during its debut week, with 7,099 physical copies sold; the PlayStation 4, Nintendo Switch and Xbox One versions did not chart at all in Media Create's weekly Japanese sales chart for their debut weeks, however, meaning that they sold less than 3,081, 2,046 and 2,384 physical copies each, respectively. Three weeks after the game's international release, however, over 100,000 copies of the game had been sold worldwide. The PlayStation Vita print release was additionally the best selling physical PlayStation Vita game in the UK during its debut week in December 2018 according to GfK Chart-Track.

== Other media ==
A sequel to the game, Spirit Hunter: NG, was released in Japan by Experience in 2018, and internationally by Aksys Games in 2019. A third game, Spirit Hunter: Death Mark II, was financed through crowdfunding, and was released in Japan in 2022.

The original game has also been adapted into other media: A novel, Shiin, written by Hitomi Amamiya and published by PHP Institute on February 20, 2019 in Japan, which tells the backstories of characters from the game; a manga adaptation of the game, which was drawn by Ena and published by Kakkiteki in Japan starting in February 2019; and an audio drama series which was released in Japan on August 19, 2019. The game's soundtrack album received a limited 12" vinyl print run by Aksys Games in 2019.

A reboot was announced by Experience in August 2025.
