= Pretty Princess Party =

2019 video game

- North American cover art
- Developer(s): Nippon Columbia
- Publisher(s): JP: Nippon Columbia; WW: Aksys Games
- Platform(s): Nintendo Switch
- Release: JP: December 5, 2019; WW: December 3, 2020
- Genre(s): Simulation
- Mode(s): Single-player, multiplayer

Pretty Princess Party (Note: Known in Japan as Pretty Princess Magical Coordinate (Japanese: プリティ・プリンセス マジカルコーディネート, Hepburn: Puriti Purinsesu Majikaru Kōdinēto)) is a 2019 simulation video game for the Nintendo Switch developed by Nippon Columbia. In the game, players create and control a princess character who serves as the stand-in for the player, with activities including decorating the rooms in a castle, dress-up, and six different minigames. The minigames can be played on one's own against computer-controlled opponents or in a multiplayer mode for up to four players.

The game saw generally positive reviews; critics liked its accessibility for child players, while still considering it appealing for adult players as well due to the castle customization and the adjustable difficulty for the minigames. The game was originally released by Nippon Columbia in Japan on December 5, 2019, and by Aksys Games internationally on December 3, 2020.

== Gameplay ==
As the princess, players decorate rooms with furniture and items.

Pretty Princess Party is a simulation video game where players create and take the role of a princess character in a fantasy world, who returns to a castle which has fallen into disrepair. The goal is to decorate the twenty rooms of the castle with a wide range of furniture and items, based on tablets indicating in what manner a room should be furnished. The game also features a dress-up activity for the princess, which includes several options for dresses, shoes, tiaras and crowns, makeup, and hair ornaments for players to pick from, and a photography mode where they can save pictures of the rooms while posing the princess in them. In addition to the story mode, the game features a list of optional challenges for players to attempt.

The player-character trains in being a princess through six different minigames: horse riding, ballroom dancing, archery, cake decoration, study, and flower arrangement. By completing these, players get access to a currency that can be used to decipher tablets or to acquire recipes and craft items, such as new outfits to wear, and furniture and decorations for the castle. Minigames are tied to one of three styles – cool, cute, and elegant – meaning one must play a variety of games to acquire all needed items for the castle. The minigames can be played alone against three computer-controlled princesses, or in a multiplayer mode supporting up to four players.

== Development ==
The game was developed by Nippon Columbia, continuing the style of the games they had previously developed for the Nintendo DS. They primarily aimed it at a child audience, with accessibility in mind. The main character was intended as a stand-in for the player, who was intended to feel like a fairy-tale princess through wearing beautiful dresses. Nippon Columbia announced the game in September 2019, and released it on December 5, 2019 in Japan for the Nintendo Switch. Aksys Games announced a localization of the game at the New Game+ Expo in June 2020, and released it internationally on December 3, 2020.

== Reception ==
Reception

Review scores
Publication	Score
Famitsu	29/40 (7, 7, 8, 7)
Siliconera	6/10

Although Pretty Princess Party saw generally positive reviews, it did not appear on Famitsu's weekly top 30 sales chart for retail video game sales in Japan during its debut week, indicating that it sold fewer than 3,000 physical copies during its first three days on sale.

Reviewers called the game accessible and good for children who like fairy tale princesses, with cute character designs. They still considered it to have appeal for adult players as well, through its element of building up an inventory of items and customizing the castle and its adjustable difficulty for the minigames. Famitsu enjoyed the core gameplay loop, but wished there were more minigames than just six; Siliconera found the minigames fine, if a little basic.

Famitsu criticized the furniture system as at times confusing, while Siliconera found the decoration charming, with furniture that looks good together, and called it unexpectedly involved. They criticized it for the long time it takes to decipher tablets, however, describing it as something one would expect from a free-to-play game rather than a paid release. Famitsu liked the dress-up, calling the clothing and hairstyles varied and beautiful, and the fluffy dresses and accessories "like a dream" for young players.
