= Aegis of Earth: Protonovus Assault =

2015 video game

- Developer: Acquire
- Publishers: JP: Acquire; EU: PQube; NA: Aksys Games
- Designer: Takeshi Oga (enemy designer)
- Composers: Noisy Croak Co., Ltd.
- Engine: Unity
- Platforms: PlayStation 3 PlayStation 4 PlayStation Vita; Microsoft Windows
- Release: PS3, VITA: JP: July 2, 2015; NA: March 15, 2016; EU: April 22, 2016; PlayStation 4: NA: March 15, 2016; EU: April 22, 2016; JP: August 1, 2016; Microsoft Windows: WW: July 19, 2016
- Genres: Strategy, real-time tactics
- Mode: Single-player

Aegis of Earth: Protonovus Assault (絶対迎撃ウォーズ, Zettai Geigeki Wars: Metropolis Defenders) is a 2015 real-time tactics video game developed and published by Acquire in Japan, with a western release by Aksys Games (North America) and PQube (Europe) coming the following year.

== Premise and gameplay ==
Aegis of Earth is set fifty years after a deadly event known as the "Silent Apocalypse". This catastrophic event brought forth various creatures hellbent on destroying humanity. Accompanying the arrival of the creatures was a new element called altenite, which stands as earth's last hope at survival. In the time prior to the game's beginnings, the surviving humans have built fortified cities which have since protected them from various assaults. However, with the approaching "Altered States" and continuous monster attacks, the inhabitants must prepare while continuing to expand and defend their cities.

Players take control of various urban areas, collecting taxes from residents, purchasing equipment, allocating resources and setting up the battlefield with units and artillery to protect the metropolis from the oncoming invasion. Once the battle has begun, waves of enemies will approach, with the player's responsibility being to use the weapons placed in the prior planning stage to defend their city. Various tactics can be used to successfully complete waves, for example, players may use the "merge" method, which involved placing two or more weapons of the same type in a line to increase the damage they will deal out.

== Release ==
The PlayStation Vita version sold 2,831 copies within its first week of release in Japan, which placed it 15th of the weekly sales charts. The PlayStation 3 version failed to make the list. These sales were considered disappointing.

In the United States, the game launched at a discounted price of $29.99 for the PlayStation 3 and Vita, as well as $39.99 for the PlayStation 4. In Canada, the low dollar forced an increase of $10 for each respective platform. Digital versions of the game released at an additional price cut.

== Reception ==
Reception

Aggregate score
| Aggregator | Score |
|---|---|
| Metacritic | PS4: 57/100 |

Review score
| Publication | Score |
|---|---|
| Destructoid | 4/10 |

Aegis of Earth: Protonovus Assault received mixed reviews from critics according to aggregate review website Metacritic.

Nic Rowen of Destructoid gave the game a 4/10, saying the graphics resemble those of a PlayStation 2 game. Additionally, Rowen criticized the dialogue and characters, citing a lack of interest for either, and called the gameplay "boring". Praise was given however to the abundance of weapons and upgrades.

Reviewing for Hardcore Gamer, Alexander Chatziioannou also insulted the graphics, comparing them to that of a PlayStation 2 as Rowen had. Additionally, Chatziioannou called the production values low, stating it was obvious the game had been made on a limited budget. However, he enjoyed his time with the title. Unlike Rowen, Chatziioannou enjoyed the dialogue and characters, comparing it to that of a teen soap drama. Ultimately though, Chatziioannou admitted that Aegis of Earth was a unexceptional, but still called the game "solid" and recommending it as an "adequate diversion", giving the title a final score of 3.5/5.
