= Variable Barricade =

2019 video game

- Developers: Otomate, Design Factory
- Publishers: JP: Idea Factory; NA/EU: Aksys Games
- Platforms: PlayStation Vita, Nintendo Switch
- Release: PlayStation Vita: JP: April 4, 2019; Nintendo Switch: JP: June 18, 2020; NA/EU: February 24, 2022
- Genres: Visual novel, otome game
- Mode: Single-player

Variable Barricade (stylized in all caps) is a 2019 otome game and visual novel developed by Otomate and Design Factory.

== Plot ==
Hibari Tojo (first name can be changed) is a teenage girl who is the only heir to her wealthy family. To her dismay, she learns that her grandfather has selected four young men to be her marriage candidates and arranged for her to live with them.

Following the game's "common route", each of Hibari's four love interests has his own route, and the game has an additional "true ending".

== Gameplay ==
As Variable Barricade is a visual novel, gameplay consists of reading text and making choices.

The choices the player makes increase either romance or reason. Increased romance levels allow the chosen love interest to break through the protagonist's "barricade", determining the ending the player sees.

The player also has access to flowchart-like "boards" that show which scenes lead into or unlock other scenes.

== Development and release ==
Variable Barricade was announced during the Otomate Party 2016 event. The game was released on April 4, 2019.

The Nintendo Switch version of the game, titled VARIABLE BARRICADE NS in Japan and released on June 18, 2020, includes new scenes and features.

Aksys Games announced in late 2020 that they would release the Nintendo Switch version of Variable Barricade in English in 2021, but this release was delayed until February 2022.

== Reception ==
Reception

Aggregate score
Aggregator	Score
Metacritic	79/100

Review scores
Publication	Score
Famitsu	33/40
Nintendo World Report	6.5/10
RPGFan	94/100
Siliconera	8/10

Variable Barricade received generally favorable reviews, according to the review aggregation website Metacritic.
