= Magus (video game) =

2014 video game

- North American cover art
- Developers: Black Tower, Aksys Games
- Publisher: Aksys Games
- Programmer: Naoki Saegusa (lead)
- Writers: Richie Casper; Rocco Scandizzo
- Engine: Unreal Engine 3
- Platform: PlayStation 3
- Release: NA: February 25, 2014; PAL: June 4, 2014
- Genres: Role-playing, action-adventure
- Mode: Single-player

Magus (pronounced "may-jus") is a 2014 action role-playing video game for the PlayStation 3, co-developed by Black Tower and Aksys Games. It has become infamous due to the negative reception it received from critics upon release and is often considered among the worst games on the console.

== Plot ==
Magus has been imprisoned in a tower in the Waterfall Kingdom and tortured for years. Magus remains handcuffed, imprisoned, immovable, clueless, and powerless, until a new prisoner, named Kinna, arrives and forces him to escape. Once Magus has escaped, their journey to discover Magus's true identity and abilities begins. Along the way they must face the wrath of the Kingdom Waterfall, and battle them in order to discover Magus's purpose.

== Gameplay ==
Magus uses divine powers, known as "Chroma Magic", which he can absorb from associated colored stones – red, green and blue. These powers increase over time and players can choose to master just one or all three. The game has a skill tree system with three (red, green and blue) chromatic arcana tiers. Magus can cast basic spells as much as he wants, but strong magic spells have a cooldown period.

== Reception ==
Reception

Aggregate score
Aggregator	Score
Metacritic	32/100

Review scores
Publication	Score
Hardcore Gamer	1/5
Joystiq	1.5/5
Push Square	2/10
RPGamer	1.5/5

Magus received "unfavorable" reviews according to the review aggregation website Metacritic. It was criticized for its dated graphics, lackluster gameplay, and poorly written dialogue and voice acting. The dialogue however had been stated as "unintentionally hilarious" and "probably the game's greatest selling point". Geoff Thew of Hardcore Gamer called it "a perfect storm of terrible ideas and botched execution", but found the game "endlessly enjoyable in spite of itself".

With a Metacritic rating of 32, Magus is the 9th lowest rated PlayStation 3 game on the website.
