= Virche Evermore: Error: Salvation =

2021 video game

- Virche Evermore

終遠のヴィルシュ (Shuuen no Virche)
- Genre: Dark fantasy, Otome
- Video game

Virche Evermore -ErroR: Salvation-
- Developer: JP: Idea Factory
- Publisher: JP: Otomate; WW: Aksys Games
- Directed by: Misa Yoshida
- Produced by: Fumiyoshi Tatematsu
- Designed by: Yomu (読)
- Platform: Nintendo Switch, Nintendo Switch Lite
- Released: JP: October 7, 2021; WW: November 9, 2023
- Video game

Virche Evermore -EpiC: Lycoris-
- Developer: JP: Idea Factory
- Publisher: JP: Otomate; WW: Aksys Games
- Directed by: Misa Yoshida
- Produced by: Fumiyoshi Tatematsu
- Designed by: Yomu (読)
- Platform: Nintendo Switch
- Released: JP: September 7, 2023; WW: November 7, 2024

Virche Evermore: Error: Salvation (終遠のヴィルシュ -ErroR:salvation-, Shuuen no Virche -ErroR:salvation-) is a Japanese otome game developed by Idea Factory and published under their Otomate brand.

== Plot ==
The story takes place in Arpéchéle (アルペシェール, Arupeshēru), a small Western European country. The people born here are cursed to die without fail by the age of 23, and for this reason, Arpéchéle was known as "the country bewitched by the Grim Reaper." As a result of long-term research conducted to resist this curse, a system was developed to allow people to live permanently by discarding their physical bodies and downloading their memories by the age of 23. The people who continue to live through this memory download system were called "Relivers." The protagonist was detested and called "the Grim Reaper" because those involved with her met with one misfortune after another. However, by meeting Ankou, who calls himself the "Watcher of Death," she comes closer to the mystery of the curse of death that infests this country.

== Characters ==
=== Main Characters ===
Ceres (セレス, Seresu)
Name can be changed
"The girl who parts ways with a fate bewitched by death"
18 years old.
The protagonist of this work. Her parents died before she was old enough to remember. She is called the "Grim Reaper" because those involved with her meet with one misfortune after another.
She usually helps out at the institution where she resides.
Yves (イヴ, Ivu)
Voiced by - Saito Sōma
"The man who enjoys the fate of loving people"
18 years old.
While being a member of the vigilante group, he runs a handyman business called Crun. He has a serious and honest personality and is highly trusted by others. A philanthropist.
He met with an accident in his childhood and has a burn on his face.
Lucas Proust (リュカ・プルースト, Ryuka Purūsu)
Voiced by - Hirakawa Daisuke
"The man who yearns for the fate of guiding people"
22 years old.
He works as a visiting teacher visiting churches and foster homes. He is methodical and sociable, and frequently shows a strong sense of justice. Deeply religious.
He has a sick younger sister and frequently visits the hospital.
Mathis Claude (マティス・クロード, Matisu Kurōdo)
Voiced by - Amasaki Kōhei
"The man who rejected the fate of forgiving people"
17 years old.
The head of the Claude family, living in the wealthy district. A timid boy who loves reading.
His deeply admired older brother was killed by the executioner "Bourreau", and he vows revenge.
Scien Brofiise (シアン・ブロフィワーズ, Shian Burofiwāzu)
Voiced by - Hosoya Yoshimasa
"The man who went wild for the fate of keeping people alive"
23 years old (physical age).
The director of the National Laboratory. The very person who developed the "memory download" system. He himself has continued to live for a long time as a "Reliver."
An efficiency-driven person. He believes that people are disposable tools, and possesses a mindset that views his own life and the lives of others as research materials.
Adolphe (アドルフ, Adorufu)
Voiced by - Yashiro Taku
"The man who resonates with the fate of seeking people"
21 years old.
The leader of the vigilante group. He grew up in the same institution as the protagonist and is like an older brother to her.
He speaks with a blunt manner of talking, but is kind at heart and has a personality where he cannot leave people in trouble alone.
Ankou (アンクゥ, Ankū)
Voiced by - Okitsu Kazuyuki
"The man who plays with the fate that rules over death"
Age unknown.
A mysterious individual who calls himself the "Watcher of Death." He approaches the protagonist and proposes that they pursue the mystery of death infesting Arpéchéle.

=== Secondary characters ===
Salome (サロメ, Sarome)
Voiced by - Kuwashima Hōko
21 years old (physical age). She manages the foster home where the protagonist lives. She herself is a "Reliver" who has survived through memory downloading.
Hugo (ヒューゴ, Hyūgo)
Voiced by - Yamashita Seiichirō
22 years old (physical age). Yves's close friend, who runs Crun (the handyman business) together with him. A member of the vigilante group.
Dahut (ダハト, Dahato)
Voiced by - Toki Shun'ichi
15 years old (physical age). The deputy director of the National Laboratory. He is called a genius second only to Scien.
Nadia Proust (ナディア・プルースト, Nadia Purūsu)
Voiced by - Kubota Risa
12 years old. Lucas's younger sister. She is hospitalized due to an illness of unknown cause.
Capucine (カプシーヌ, Kapushīnu)
Voiced by - Sawashiro Chiharu
22 years old. The director of the hospital where Nadia is hospitalized. He is also the 7th leader of the "Exorcist Order," which views Relivers as evil.
Jean (ジャン, Jan)
Voiced by - Takatsuka Tomohito
19 years old. A young man who serves as a butler for the Claude family.

== Media ==
=== Games ===
On November 20, 2020, the first game Virche Evermore: Error: Salvation (終遠のヴィルシュ -ErroR:salvation-, Shuuen no Virche -ErroR:salvation-), was announced as a collaboration between Otomate and illustrator Yomu. The games official website was launched on April 20, 2021, where much of the details regarding the game were revealed. On May 6, 2021, the opening movie for the game was released. On June 25, 2021, a promotional video for the game was released by Idea Factory. The game was released for the Nintendo Switch on October 7, 2021. At Anime Expo 2022, Aksys Games announced that they had licensed the game for an English release. The game was released in English on November 9, 2023.

A sequel titled Virche Evermore: -EpiC:lycoris- (終遠のヴィルシュ -EpiC:lycoris-, Shuuen no Virushe -EpiC:lycoris-), was announced at the Otomate Party 2022 (held between 3 and 4 September 2022). The official website was launched on April 20, 2023. On April 27, 2023, the opening movie was released, featuring the song Tayutau Hana (たゆたう花; 'Swaying Flower'), sung by Gesshoku Kaigi. On May 25, 2023, a special preview for the game was released. The game was released for the Nintendo Switch on September 7, 2023. In February 2024, Aksys Games announced that they were going to release the game in English. The game was released in English on November 7, 2024.

=== Reading plays ===
Virche Evermore has been performed as a full-length stage reading event under the Otomate Dramatic Theatre (オトメイトドラマティックシアター) brand.

- vol.3 Virche Evermore -RequieM:memory- (vol.3 終遠のヴィルシュ -RequieM:memory-, vol.3 Shuuen no Virushe -RequieM:memory-) performed at the Omiya Sonic City Main Hall on July 2, 2023.
- vol.3re Virche Evermore -LyriC:memory- (vol.3re 終遠のヴィルシュ -LyriC:memory-, vol.3re Shuuen no Virushe -LyriC:memory-) performed at the TFT Hall 1000 on June 15, 2025.

=== Stage play ===
Virche Evermore has been adapted twice into stage plays, in 2024, and 2026.

Virche Evermore: -Error: Salvation- Case. Scien Brofiise (終遠のヴィルシュ -ErroR:salvation- Case. Scien Brofiise, Shūen no Virushe -ErroR:salvation- Kēsu Shian Burofiwāzu), directed by Awashima Zuimaro was performed at Theatre Sunmall from 19 to 29 December 2024.

Cast
Character	Actor
Scien Brofiise	Ryusei Kitade
Ceres	Yuri Ota
Yves	Kento Kitamura
Lucas Proust	Mashiro Sano
Mathis Claude	Ryunosuke Nagashima
Adolphe	Gaku Takamoto
Ankou	Mitsuaki Hayashi
Salome	Haruna Ishii
Hugo	Ryota Nakada
Dahut	Ruito Koga
Ensemble	Masaya Hashimoto; Jo Koizumi; Haru Kubo; Yuki Otsuka; Arata Ryuzaki

Virche Evermore: -Error: Salvation- Case. Yves (終遠のヴィルシュ -ErroR:salvation- Case. Yves, Shūen no Virushe -ErroR:salvation- Kēsu Īvu) was performed at the Yurakucho Yomiuri Hall from 23 to 29 April 2026.

Cast
Character	Actor
Scien Brofiise	Ryusei Kitade
Ceres	Yuri Ota
Yves	Kento Kitamura
Lucas Proust	Mashiro Sano
Mathis Claude	Ryunosuke Nagashima
Adolphe	Gaku Takamoto
Ankou	Mitsuaki Hayashi
Salome	Haruna Ishii
Hugo	Ryota Nakada
Dahut	Ruito Koga
Ensemble	Masaya Hashimoto; Jo Koizumi; Haru Kubo; Yuki Otsuka; Arata Ryuzaki

== Reception ==
According to Famitsu's sales rankings from 4th till 10th September, 2023, EpiC:lycoris ranked fourth place with 8,633 units sold.
