= Rockin' Pretty =

2009 video game

- North American box art
- Developer: Arc System Works
- Publishers: JP: Arc System Works; EU: 505 Games; NA: Aksys Games; KR: CyberFront Korea
- Composer: Yasufumi Fukuda
- Platform: Nintendo DS
- Release: JP: May 21, 2009; NA: July 28, 2009; KR: February 21, 2012
- Genre: Rhythm
- Modes: Single-player, multi-player

Rockin' Pretty, known in Japan and South Korea as Happy Star Band (ハッピー☆スター☆バンド, Happī☆Sutā☆Bando) (Korean: 해피 스타 밴드 ~전국민 오디션 밴드편~) and in Europe as Diva Girls: Making the Music, is a 2009 rhythm game. It was developed and published in Japan by Arc System Works, in Europe by 505 Games, in North America by Aksys Games, and in South Korea by CyberFront Korea.

== Gameplay ==
Guitar gameplay in Rockin' Pretty

Rockin' Pretty features 4 different instruments to choose from. Players can choose between guitar, bass, keyboard, and drums, which each have their own unique play style.

Each stage consists of one or two songs, in which the player must complete before moving on to the next stage. Players can choose between easy, normal, and hard difficulties. This game also features an AutoPlay mode, in which players can watch the computer complete the stage.

Players can also customize the character's outfits and instruments by purchasing them in the game's shop menus using points. Points are obtained clearing songs and collecting stars. Stars are piled up on the top screen as the player plays through a song. The better the score, the higher the stars will pile. If the stars reach past the top line, players will collect the stars by dragging the stylus at the end of each stage. The game supports multi-player with local wireless connectivity.

== Plot ==
=== Characters ===
- Mai (まひる, Mahiru) is the guitarist in the band "Starlight". She's a happy, energetic girl who has dreamt of participating in the Rockin' Pretty contest. She has been practicing the guitar on her own until she was introduced to Kara. Reena calls her Mai-mai.
- Kara (カナミ, Kanami) is the bassist in the band "Starlight". She is an athletic tomboy who is the leader of the band "Starlight". She goes to the same school as Mai but has never spoken to her before.
- Mio (ミオ, Mio) is the keyboardist in the band "Starlight". As an intelligent, serious young girl, she aspires to become a great musician like her parents.
- Reena (リコ, Riko) is the drummer in the band "Starlight". A happy-go-lucky girl who enjoys strange things. She goes to the same school as Mio.
- Kenneth (ハヤト, Hayato) is a former "Rockin' Pretty" participant and works at the Instrument Center. He is Kara's brother and the one who assembled "Starlight". He is also referred to as Ken.
- Michelle (マイコ, Maiko) is a former "Rockin' Pretty" participant and works at the Dress-up Boutique. She helps the band "Starlight" get a gig at Star Cafe and gives them additional support.
- DJ H-Star (DJ H-STAR) is the MC for the "Rockin' Pretty" contest. He also owns the Star Cafe.

=== Story ===
Every year, bands gather from all over the country to participate in the "Rockin' Pretty" contest. Those who win are awarded a record deal, several hits, and stardom.

Mai watches a DVD of Rockin' Pretty in the lobby of Rockin' Hits Studio. She has always wished to enter Rockin' Pretty but has never found a band to join. However, Ken introduces her to his sister Kara, who is in dire need of a new guitarist after recently losing her old one. The group performs "See you again", which went better than expected. After their performance, the band accepts Mai into their group. They head to Central Park shortly after, which is known for hosting many band performances. "Starlight" performs attracting a number of people, but is overshadowed by the boy band "The Dreamboats". Fearing that they can't find places to perform, "Starlight" visits Michelle, a former Rockin' Pretty participant, for help.

"Starlight" is booked to play in Star Cafe, a famous cafe known for the variety of music played. There is a rumor that if the owner likes a band's music, they'll do well in Rockin' Pretty. Following their performance, DJ H-Star compliments "Starlight" on their performance and reveals that he is the owner of the cafe. He tells them that although they are lacking skill-wise, they have soul. The next day at the preliminaries, DJ H-Star visits "Starlight" to tell them that they are performing first. Out of the twenty bands, the two who made it to the next round were "The Dreamboats" and "Love Connection". However, runners-up have a second chance at the preliminaries at Melody Mall. Thirty bands have arrived at Melody Mall and "Starlight" was selected as the 15th band to perform. During their waiting period, Reena felt that they just didn't reach their crowd's heart. Mio suggests that they should be more cute, energetic, and have more fun. The band accepts Mio's suggestion and decide to play "Fluttering Heart" and "Happy Sunday".

Their new style was an apparent success and will be moving on to the semi-finals. The band had decided that they wanted to play one more live show before semi-finals. However, most places are booked so Reena decides to bring them to Symphony Park. They decide to play here and ask Ken to bring the instruments. The park performance was a complete success, attracting a wide variety of people. On the day of the semi-finals, the girls play with confidence and spirit. At the end of the semi-finals, DJ H-Star announces that "The Dreamboats" and "Starlight" will make it to the finals. He also compliments the girls on their improvement since the preliminaries. On the day of the finals, the girls reminisce on how they met. Following the performance of "The Dreamboats", the girls thank everybody who has helped them and promises to make this their best performance, playing the song "Rockin' Nova".

== Release ==
Rockin' Pretty is a spinoff of Princess on Ice (プリンセス☆オン☆アイス, Purinsesu on Aisu) which was released on April 25, 2008 in Europe. It was later released with the same box art in North America, but the characters were redesigned in the Japanese release.

The game was published by Aksys Games on July 28, 2009. It was released in South Korea by Cyberfront Korea on February 21, 2012.
