= Piofiore: Fated Memories =

2018 video game

ピオフィオーレの晩鐘 (Piofiōre no Banshō)
- Genre: Otome, Visual novel, crime, romance
- Video game

Piofiore: Fated Memories
- Developer: Idea Factory, Design Factory
- Publisher: Idea Factory
- Genre: Visual novel
- Platform: PS Vita; Nintendo Switch
- Released: JP: August 30, 2018 (PS Vita); JP: July 25, 2019 (Switch); WW: October 8, 2020
- Video game

Piofiore: Episodio 1926
- Developer: Idea Factory, Design Factory
- Publisher: Idea Factory
- Genre: Visual novel
- Platform: Nintendo Switch
- Released: JP: November 12, 2020; NA: September 22, 2022; EU: September 23, 2022

Piofiore: Fated Memories (ピオフィオーレの晩鐘, Piofiore no Banshou; lit. 'Piofiore's Vesper Bells') is a Japanese otome game released by Otomate on August 30, 2018.

== Production and release ==
The game was originally announced during the Otome Part 2017 (held between September 2 and 3, 2017). The game was released on August 30, 2018 for PlayStation Vita. A version for the Nintendo Switch was released on July 25, 2019 under the title Piofiore: Fated Memories -ricordo- (ピオフィオーレの晩鐘 -ricordo-), it was later ported for IOS and Android as well. A sequel titled Piofiore: Fated Memories -Episodio 1926- (ピオフィオーレの晩鐘 -Episodio 1926-) was announced during the Otome Party 2019, and released on November 12, 2020.

=== International release ===
Piofiore: Fated Memories was released in English for both North America and Europe by Aksys Games on October 8, 2020, for the Nintendo Switch. Episodio 1926 was also released in English for North America on September 22, 2022, it was released Europe the following day.

== Plot ==
Set in 1925, shortly after World War I, in the fictional Southern Italian town of Brulone (ブルローネ, Bururone), a town by the Adriatic Sea and controlled by the mafia with three different mafia families known as the "Brulone Mafia", the protagonist, Liliana Adornato, finds herself getting entangled with them. The families include: Falzone (ファルツォーネ, Farutsuōne; They have served as the Lord of Burlone since ancient times. They value bloodlines, traditions, and rules, with a policy of blood-based elitism where all members must be of Italian descent. They control the Falce District, the largest area of Burlone.), Visconti (ヴィスコンティ, Visukonti; A relatively new family who oppose of Falzone family. Their members consist of those who deflected the Falzone family. They are based on meritocracy, where members are promoted based on ability regardless of bloodline or nationality. They control the Creta District, which faces the sea and is a bustling area with active trade and many shops standing in rows.), and Lao-Shu (老鼠(ラオシュー), Raoshū; They are a sub-organisation of the Chinese group Rokuhoukai (六鳳会). They control the Veleno District, which is rather small as compared to other territories, however, it has a large population density of Chinese residents.)

== Characters ==
=== Main Characters ===
Liliana Adornato (リリアーナ・アドルナート, Ririāna Adorunāto)
*Name can be changed
21 years old. The protagonist of this story. She lives in the Burlone Church. She knows nothing about her life before living at the church. She has a birthmark on her chest.
Dante Falzone (ダンテ・ファルツォーネ, Dante Farutsuōne)
Voice - Kaito Ishikawa
23 years old. Born September 17th, blood type A. Height 178cm.
Capo (boss) of the "Falzone Family." He succeeded his father 5 years ago and became the head of the "Falzone House."
Having received an elite education as the legitimate successor of the family, he is often perceived as cold due to his respect for tradition and rules, but he is actually warm-hearted and takes good care of others.
Gilbert Redford (ギルバート・レッドフォード, Girubāto Reddofōdo)
Voice - Showtaro Morikubo
26 years old. Born July 26th, blood type O. Height 182cm.
Boss of the "Visconti Family." He wears an eyepatch over his left eye. He is flashy and confident, but is approachable and friendly to everyone.
Yang (楊, Yan)
Voice - Nobuhiko Okamoto
29 years old. Born December 12th, blood type B. Height 175cm.
Leader of the "Lao-Shu." "Yang" is an alias, and no one knows his real name. He acts according to his mood at the time and is a hedonist who pursues temporary pleasure.
Nicola Francesca (ニコラ・フランチェスカ, Nikora Furanchesuka)
Voice - Ryohei Kimura
28 years old. Born June 28th, blood type AB. Height 177cm.
Number 2 of the "Falzone Family" and the Capo's right-hand man. He is Dante's cousin. A typical Italian man, he is good with women.
Contrary to his good-natured appearance, which seems uncharacteristic of a mafia member, he can lie with ease when necessary.
Orlok (オルロック, Orurokku)
Voice - Toshiyuki Toyonaga
18 years old. Born April 23rd, blood type B. Height 170cm.
An informant who trades with the three "Burlone Mafia" organizations. His base of operations is a hideout in the "Creta District." He is reticent and a bit naive about the world.

=== Other Characters ===
Direttore (ディレットーレ, Direttōre) \ Henri Lambert (アンリ・ランベール, Anri Ranbēru)
Voice - Shinnosuke Tachibana
33 years old. Born January 18th, blood type AB. Height 180cm.
The manager (Direttore) of the state-run casino in Burlone; his legal Italian name is Sebastiano Gallie (セバスティアーノ・ガリエ, Sebasutiāno Garie). He provides a room in the casino for the "Burlone Mafia."
Leo Cavannis (レオ・カヴァニス, Reo Kabanisu)
Voice - Shunichi Toki
21 years old. Born May 17th, blood type O. Height 172cm.
A member of the "Falzone Family."
Julia Ceste (ジュリア・チェステ, Juria Chesute)
Voice - Harumi Asai
52 years old. Born August 2nd, blood type O. Height 161cm.
A housekeeper at the "Falzone House."
Oliver Haas (オリヴァー・ハース, Orivā Hāsu)
Voice - Toshiki Iwasawa
34 years old. Born January 30th, blood type A. Height 180cm.
Legal counsel for the "Visconti Family." A friend of Gilbert.
Lee Shi-Shan (リー・シーシャン, Rī Shīshan)
Voice - Keishi Inomata
28 years old. Born September 10th, blood type AB. Height 172cm.
The leader of a large faction that serves as number 2 within the "Lao-Shu" organization.
Roberto De Feo (ロベルト・デ・フェオ, Roberuto De Feo)
Voice - Yoshiyuki Matsuura
26 years old. Born July 17th, blood type AB. Height 180cm.
A detective with the Burlone Police Department. From another city.
Marco Calderoni (マルコ・カルデローニ, Maruko Karuderoni)
Voice - Gentoku
55 years old. Born January 5th, blood type A. Height 175cm.
A detective with the Burlone Police Department. Roberto's instructor.
Lan (ラン, Ran)
Voice - Juri Nagatsuma
15 years old. Born April 29th, blood type B. Height 158cm.
A combatant for the "Lao-Shu." Fei's twin sister.
Fei (フェイ, Fei)
Voice - Natsu Yorita
15 years old. Born April 29th, blood type B. Height 158cm.
A combatant for the "Lao-Shu." Lan's twin brother.
Emilio (エミリオ, Emirio)
Voice - Kōhei Amasaki
Age, birthday, and blood type unknown. Height 155cm.
A member of the clergy in Rome, "The Church."
Josef von Rosberg (ヨゼフ・フォン・ロズベルグ, YozeFu fon Rozuberugu)
Voice - Hitoshi Kamibeppu
62 years old. Born March 1st, blood type A. Height 169cm.
A member of the clergy in Rome, "The Church."
Luca (ルカ, Ruka)
Voice - Kaoru Sasajima
12 years old. Born June 4th, blood type B. Height 150cm.
A boy living in the slums called the "Strano District."
Elena Croce (エレナ・クローチェ, Erena Kurōche)
Voice - Marika Tanaka
22 years old. Born March 28th, blood type O. Height 162cm.
The protagonist's friend. She lives in the Burlone Church.
Sophia (ソフィア, Sofia)
Voice - Maya Okamoto
50 years old. Born December 3rd, blood type A. Height 160cm.
A nun at the Burlone Church.

=== Characters from "-Episodio1926-" ===
???
Voice - Kazuyuki Okitsu
34 years old. Blood type B. Height 182cm.
A mysterious man wearing a mask.
Theo (テオ, Teo)
Voice - Yoshiki Nakajima
22 years old. Blood type AB. Height 170cm.
A member of the clergy in Rome, "The Church."
Yuan (袁, Yuen)
Voice - Kenjiro Tsuda
An executive of the Chinese mafia, "Rokuhoukai."
Rui (睿, Rui)
Voice - Kento Hama
Yuan's subordinate. Becomes the new number 2 of the Lao-Shu.
Eugene (ユージーン, Yūjīn)
Voice - Shunsuke Sakuya
45 years old. Blood type O. Height 179cm.
An executive of the Chicago Mafia.
Raul Ghirlandaio (ラウル・ギルランダイオ, Rauru Girurandaio)
Voice - Kyousuke Kitayama
34 years old. Blood type AB. Height 177cm.
A distant relative of Dante and Nicola.
Johann Steiner (ヨハン・シュタイナー, Yohan Shutainā)
Voice - Toshinari Fukamachi
17 years old. Blood type B. Height 170cm.
An agent who came in place of Orlok.
Jack Avery (ジャック・エイヴァリー, Jakku Eivarī)
Voice - Koji Kawakami
21 years old. Blood type B. Height 177cm.
A hitman who came from Chicago.

== Music ==
=== Piofiore: Fated Memories ===
- Opening theme song: Nocturnal, with composition and arrangement from myu (composer). Lyrics by Yoshie Isoya. Vocals from Mao (singer, born December 20) and Kaori Oda.
- First ending theme song: Kaze-bana ~winter white lily~' (「風花 ～winter white lily～」; 'Snow Flurry ～winter white lily～'), with composed and arrangement from myu, lyrics by Yoshie Isoya, and vocals by SHOJI.
- Second ending theme song: Whispering Hope, with composition and arrangement by Ken Masutani, lyrics by Yoshie Isoya, and vocals by Kaori Oda.
- Third ending theme song: Fault, with composition & Arrangement by myu, lyrics by Yoshie Isoya, and vocals by mao.

=== Episodio 1926 ===
- Opening theme song: Current, with composition & arrangement by myu, lyrics by Yoshie Isoya, and vocals mao and Kaori Oda.
- First ending theme song: Hoshikage ~stella starrium~ (星影 ～stella starrium～; 'Light of the stars ~stella starrium~'), with composition & arrangement by Naoyuki Nagata, lyrics by Yoshie Isoya, and vocals by mao and Kaori Oda.
- Second ending song: Last Twilight, with composition and arrangement by Sei Anze, lyrics by Yoshie Isoya, and vocals by Kaori Oda.
- Third ending theme song: Silent Glim, with composition and arrangement by myu, lyrics by Yoshie Isoya, and vocals by mao.

== Stage play ==
A stage play under the title Piofiore: Fated Memories –The Fateful White Lily– (ピオフィオーレの晩鐘〜運命の白百合〜, Piofiore no Banshou ~Unmei no Shirayuri~) was performed at the Theater Sunmall in Tokyo. With eight total performances from October 23 to October 27, 2019.

=== Cast ===
Character	Actor
Dante Falzone	Yū Matsuda
Liliana Adornato	Yasuna Kageyama
Nicola Francesca	Shin'ichi Hashimoto
Gilbert Redford	Zen'itsu Hashimoto
Orlok	Issei Omata
Leo Cavannis	Haruto (CUBERS)
Roberto de Feo	Yūsuke Sera
Lee See-shan	Kazuto Watanabe (former VOYZ BOY) (Note: Initially, Kazuma Ibuki was scheduled to play the role, but he withdrew.)
Direttore	Shōgo Ajiro
Marco Calderoni	Yūki Takamizu
Lan	Saya Inoue
Fei	Mizuki Tōno
Oliver Haas	Takuya Kinoshita
Sofia	Eiko Nanami
Emilio	VALSHE
Yang	Toshihiko Tanaka

=== Ensemble ===
- Satsuki Sakuragi
- Keisuke Miyamoto
- Reon Kirita
- Shōta Yamanaka
- Hidehira Takamizawa

== Musical ==
A musical was originally planned for March 19 to March 21, 2021 at Tokyo Theatre 1010, and later at COOL PARK OSAKA from March 26 to March 28, 2021. However, due to the COVID-19 Pandemic, it was postponed to May 2022. Some of the staff was changed, the musical was performed from May 5 to May 15, 2022, at Tokyo's Sunshine Theatre.

=== Cast ===
Character	Actor
Liliana Adornato	Yui Ito
Dante Falzone	Kōta Shin'zato
Gilbert Redford	Masamichi Satanaka
Yang	Shōjirō Yokoi
Nicola Francesca	Mizuki Chiba
Orlok	Ryōki Nagae
Lan	Haruki Iwata
Fei	Yūka Yamauchi
Leo Cavannis	Rikiya Tomizono (VOYZ BOY)
Oliver Haas	Hiroki Satō
Lee See-shan	Shunsuke Takagi
Roberto de Feo	Hiromu Kudō
Emilio	Hitoshi Horinouchi
Direttore	Minami Tsurimoto (withdrew) / Shūto Washio

== Drama CDs ==
- Piofiore: Fated Memories Original Soundtrack (ピオフィオーレの晩鐘 オリジナルサウンドトラック, Piofiōre no Banshō Orijinaru Saundotorakku; TEAM Entertainment, September 5, 2018, XFCD-0063)
- Piofiore: Fated Memories Drama CD ~Mascherata di mezzanotte~ (ピオフィオーレの晩鐘 ドラマCD ～Mascherata di mezzanotte～, Piofiōre no Banshō Dorama CD ~Mascherata di mezzanotte~; TEAM Entertainment, May 29, 2019, XFCD-101)
- Piofiore: Fated Memories Character CD Vol.1 Dante Falzone (ピオフィオーレの晩鐘 Character CD Vol.1 ダンテ・ファルツォーネ, Piofiōre no Banshō Kyarakutā CD Vol.1 Dante Farutsōne; TEAM Entertainment, February 26, 2020, XFCD-0132)
- Piofiore: Fated Memories Character CD Vol.2 Gilbert Redford (ピオフィオーレの晩鐘 Character CD Vol.2 ギルバート・レッドフォード, Piofiōre no Banshō Kyarakutā CD Vol.2 Girubāto Reddofōdo; TEAM Entertainment, March 25, 2020, XFCD-0133)
- Piofiore: Fated Memories Character CD Vol.3 Yang (ピオフィオーレの晩鐘 Character CD Vol.3 楊, Piofiōre no Banshō Kyarakutā CD Vol.3 Yan; TEAM Entertainment, April 22, 2020, XFCD-0134)
- Piofiore: Fated Memories Character CD Vol.4 Nicola Francesca (ピオフィオーレの晩鐘 Character CD Vol.4 ニコラ・フランチェスカ, Piofiōre no Banshō Kyarakutā CD Vol.4 Nikora Furanchesuka; TEAM Entertainment, May 27, 2020, XFCD-0135)
- Piofiore: Fated Memories Character CD Vol.5 Orlok (ピオフィオーレの晩鐘 Character CD Vol.5 オルロック, Piofiōre no Banshō Kyarakutā CD Vol.5 Orurokku; TEAM Entertainment, June 24, 2020, XFCD-0136)
- Piofiore: Fated Memories Drama CD ~Grazie di cuore~ (ピオフィオーレの晩鐘 ドラマCD ～Grazie di cuore～, Piofiōre no Banshō Dorama CD ~Grazie di cuore~; TEAM Entertainment, December 16, 2020, XFCD-0167)
- Piofiore: Fated Memories -Episodio1926- Original Soundtrack (ピオフィオーレの晩鐘 -Episodio1926- オリジナルサウンドトラック, Piofiōre no Banshō -Episodio1926- Orijinaru Saundotorakku; TEAM Entertainment, December 16, 2020, XFCD-0168)
- Piofiore: Fated Memories Character Drama CD Vol.1 Nicola Francesca (ピオフィオーレの晩鐘 Character Drama CD Vol.1 ニコラ・フランチェスカ, Piofiōre no Banshō Kyarakutā Dorama CD Vol.1 Nikora Furanchesuka; TEAM Entertainment, April 28, 2021, XFCD-0188)
- Piofiore: Fated Memories Character Drama CD Vol.2 Gilbert Redford (ピオフィオーレの晩鐘 Character Drama CD Vol.2 ギルバート・レッドフォード, Piofiōre no Banshō Kyarakutā Dorama CD Vol.2 Girubāto Reddofōdo; TEAM Entertainment, May 26, 2021, XFCD-0189)
- Piofiore: Fated Memories Character Drama CD Vol.3 Orlok (ピオフィオーレの晩鐘 Character Drama CD Vol.3 オルロック, Piofiōre no Banshō Kyarakutā Dorama CD Vol.3 Orurokku; TEAM Entertainment, June 23, 2021, XFCD-0190)
- Piofiore: Fated Memories Character Drama CD Vol.4 Yang (ピオフィオーレの晩鐘 Character Drama CD Vol.4 楊, Piofiōre no Banshō Kyarakutā Dorama CD Vol.4 Yan; TEAM Entertainment, July 28, 2021, XFCD-0191)
- Piofiore: Fated Memories Character Drama CD Vol.5 Henri Lambert (ピオフィオーレの晩鐘 Character Drama CD Vol.5 アンリ・ランベール, Piofiōre no Banshō Kyarakutā Dorama CD Vol.5 Anri Ranbēru; TEAM Entertainment, August 25, 2021, XFCD-0192)
- Piofiore: Fated Memories Character Drama CD Vol.6 Dante Falzone (ピオフィオーレの晩鐘 Character Drama CD Vol.6 ダンテ・ファルツォーネ, Piofiōre no Banshō Kyarakutā Dorama CD Vol.6 Dante Farutsōne; TEAM Entertainment, September 22, 2021, XFCD-0193)
