= Family Pirate Party =

2009 video game

- Developer: Arc System Works
- Publisher: Aksys Games
- Platform: Wii (WiiWare)
- Release: JP: January 17, 2009; NA: May 11, 2009; PAL: July 30, 2010
- Genre: Party
- Modes: Single-player, Multiplayer

Family Pirate Party / Okiraku Sugoroku Wii (おきらくすごろくWii in Japan) is a pirate-themed party video game developed by Arc System Works for WiiWare. It was released in Japan on January 17, 2009, and later, released in North America on May 11, 2009, and the PAL region on July 30, 2010.

== Gameplay ==
Players control a member of a family, which includes a mother, father, son (Billy), and daughter (Sarah), as they traverse around a group of islands, competing against each other to collect the most gold pieces. In addition to picking up random Help Cards that allows them to gain more gold or steal pieces from other players, players may also encounter brief minigames that require them to use the Wii Remote to fight off an angry octopus or shoot down cannonballs or asteroids heading towards them.

The game features additional downloadable content in the form of new maps and a swimsuit costume for each character.

== Reception ==
Reception

Aggregate scores
Aggregator	Score
GameRankings	36.83%
Metacritic	46/100

Review scores
Publication	Score
IGN	4.5/10
Nintendo Life	3/10

Family Pirate Party received negative reviews from critics upon release. On Metacritic, the game holds a score of 46/100 based on 4 reviews, indicating "generally unfavorable reviews". On GameRankings, the game holds a score of 36.83% based on 6 reviews.

IGN criticized the game's lack of interaction, noting that the gameplay largely equates to "nothing more than the random, repetitive rolling of dice" by the computer. Nintendo Life called it "a poor man's Mario Party". Both reviews criticized Family Pirate Party's few mini-games, which they felt should have been the focus of the game as in the Mario title.
