= Creeping Terror (video game) =

2017 video game

- Developers: Nikkatsu Corporation, Mebius
- Publisher: Aksys Games
- Platforms: 3DS, Windows
- Release: WW: October 31, 2017
- Genres: Adventure, horror
- Mode: Single-player

Creeping Terror (Japanese: CREEPING TERROR クリーピング・テラー) is a 2D survival horror video game developed by Nikkatsu Corporation and Mebius for the Nintendo 3DS eShop and Steam. It was released in Japan on January 8, 2017, and it was published in western regions by Aksys Games where it was released on October 31, 2017. Inspired by traditional horror, the story follows a group of teenage friends who journey into an abandoned mansion with the intent of recording their experiences for an online video, and soon find themselves on the run from a terrifying figure. Players control Arisa, a Japanese exchange student, who must use only her wits and what's around her to find her friends and escape with her life.

As with many other horror games, the main story is left purposefully vague and ambiguous, with in-game materials providing supplementary information on the game's background and lore.

== Story ==
An abandoned mansion has recently been the subject of monster sightings and rumored disappearances among students. Arisa, a Japanese exchange student living in America, journeys to the mansion alongside her school friends, Bob, Emily; who is Bob's sister, and her supposed "loverboy", Ken, at the bequest of Bob. Bob wishes to film an online video of the mansion and wants a "cute girl in a uniform" in it to rack in views. After entering the mansion, an earthquake causes part of the flooring to cave in, and Arisa falls into the caves below the mansion, separated from the others, and without cell phone reception. While attempting to escape the caves, she encounters a shovel-wielding "monster", who subsequently stalks her to attempt to kill her. Arisa ultimately encounters Emily and the two escape into the mansion above.

After discovering that the bridge that allows escape from the premises has been destroyed, Arisa encounters a robed figure with an intent to specifically stalk her and is saved from her first encounter with the figure by a timely arrival from Bob. After restoring power to the mansion, Arisa discovers a route to another building nearby. Bob gets injured during another confrontation with the robed figure, and Arisa journeys to the other building by herself.

On her way there she is saved from falling to her death by Ken. Ken says that he has been hiding in the other building, a hospital. Arisa explores the hospital and uncovers bandages, and then discovers that Ken is missing. Arisa either returns immediately to the mansion to find an alive Emily and Bob, or she returns after a failed hunt for Ken and discovers their dead bodies. Arisa returns to the hospital to look for Ken, and either does or does not uncover a document that proves Ken's identity as the robed stalker, before discovering the information regarding an escape route. Depending on who is currently alive and what information she has uncovered, Arisa either escapes on her own, escapes with just Emily and Bob, escapes with Emily, Bob, and Ken, or escapes with just Ken, after which Arisa seemingly kills the "shovel monster" during a final confrontation.

If the escapees do not have the knowledge of Ken's true intent (all four/Arisa and Ken) they encounter the "shovel monster" again, whereas if they know Ken's true intent (Arisa, Emily and Bob/just Arisa) they are instead confronted by the robed stalker, who reveals that he is, indeed, Ken. Arisa is stalked one last time, either by the shovel-monster, or by the crazed Ken, up a series of ladders; in the case of the latter, Ken has been revealed as a mentally unsound stalker of Arisa who thinks that his divine purpose from God is to be with Arisa and to kill anyone else who gets near her. The stalker falls, seemingly to their death. If the final stalker was the "shovel monster", he mentions the names "Jessica" and "Ken" before he falls. The rest of the characters survive and reach the surface.

=== Endings ===
- Ending A: Arisa, Emily, Bob, and Ken all survive. They reach the surface after escaping the "shovel-monster", and return to their ordinary lives.
- Ending B: Arisa, Emily, and Bob survive after Arisa's escape from the stalker-Ken and are relieved to hear police sirens in the distance.
- Ending C: Arisa is the sole survivor after escaping the stalker-Ken. She is found by a police officer, but Ken kills him, and maniacally approaches the terrified Arisa.
- Ending D: Arisa and Ken survive after escaping the "shovel-monster", seemingly safe, and leave the rest to the police. A figure kills the police officers who enter the mansion.

== Gameplay ==
Players control Arisa through mapped locations, primarily consisting of an abandoned mansion and hospital, to progress the narrative and locate a method of escape. While exploring, the player may encounter one of several hostile figures intent on murdering, or otherwise stalking, Arisa. The player must escape from the figure by running away, and can throw the hostile figure off by hiding in one of the many "hiding spots". The player's only method of attack is throwing items which can temporarily stun a hostile. While she is being chased, Arisa has a stamina meter that decreases as she runs. If her stamina runs out entirely, she will not be able to run until it has fully recharged. Her total stamina also suffers permanent decrease when Arisa takes damage. If caught by a hostile the players take damage and must fight back to avoid getting killed outright. The lower Arisa's health is the harder it becomes to fight back when caught.

The player uses a flashlight app on Arisa's phone to light dark areas, which uses up the phone's battery power. They can find chargers throughout the map, which can be used to recharge Arisa's phone. Certain objects, such as rocks, may not be seen by Arisa if her flashlight is not on, resulting in her stumbling or falling over them. Other inventory objects that can be found are rations which can increase health, and throwing objects, which can be used to both get through sections of the game as well as stun hostiles. The player can find various documents throughout the map, which provide supplementary information regarding the game's story and lore. The game has multiple endings, with the ending that player gets being determined via choices that the player makes at a few key moments.

== Reception ==
The game received an aggregate score of 55/100 on Metacritic, indicating mixed or average reception. Fellow review aggregator OpenCritic assessed that the game received weak approval, being recommended by only 10% of critics.

CJ Andriessen of Destructoid rated the game 5/10 points, calling it "serviceable". While he appreciated its tribute to a "bygone era of horror gaming", he otherwise considered it a "toss-away title". Jenni Lada of Siliconera compared the game to the Clock Tower series, stating that it was made for those who wanted to feel hunted, but not in any real danger. Tris Mendoza of RPGFan rated Creeping Terror 58/100 points, saying it was overly easy and forgettable, and criticizing its lack of voice acting, but noting that its mystery was intriguing.

Cubed3 called the production value and graphics impeccable, stating that they look "incredible for a 3DS game". Although they felt that the "main event", the game's "stalkers", were undermined by a lack of challenge and difficulty, as well as being generic and uninteresting. They considered all the "working pieces" for a definitive 3DS horror game to be present, but "horribly implemented", and felt the attempt to create an exciting experience was "half-hearted".
