= Guilty Gear X2 updated versions =

Overview of the updated versions of Guilty Gear X2

Guilty Gear X2 (released as Guilty Gear XX: The Midnight Carnival in Japan) is a 2D fighting video game developed by Arc System Works, and published by Sammy Studios. It was first released on May 23, 2002 for Japanese arcades, and later ported to the PlayStation 2 for North America in 2003. The game received a series of updated revisions for several platforms, each containing various adjustments: Guilty Gear X2 #Reload (2003), Guilty Gear XX Slash (2005), Guilty Gear XX Accent Core (2006), Guilty Gear XX Accent Core Plus (2008), and Guilty Gear XX Accent Core Plus R (2012).

Although each installment has received both praise and criticism for its particularities, all the Guilty Gear X2 updated versions have generally been well received by critics. Graphics, online option and its price were the aspects most praised for the first update, while Accent Core divided opinions about its innovations and was panned by its Wii controls. Core Plus was the source of much praise, although it was not totally satisfying for reviewers; Plus R is the one that has the lowest average scores from GameRankings and Metacritic. However, as of 2022, Plus R is currently the highest rated traditional 2D fighting game on Steam. Sales-wise, there is a decline from #Reload to Core Plus.

== Guilty Gear X2 #Reload ==
Guilty Gear X2 #Reload
- Developer: Arc System Works
- Publishers: Sammy Studios: JP: Sammy Studios (Arcade, PS2); JP: Microsoft Game Studios (Xbox); JP: Media Kite (Win); JP: Sega (PSP); NA: Majesco (Xbox); EU: Zoo Digital Publishing (Win, Xbox, PS2)
- Series: Guilty Gear
- Platforms: Arcade, PlayStation 2, Microsoft Windows, Xbox, PlayStation Portable, Xbox 360 (Xbox Originals)
- Release: March 26, 2003: Arcade; JP: March 26, 2003 PlayStation 2; JP: July 31, 2003; EU: November 26, 2004 Xbox; JP: April 29, 2004; NA: September 14, 2004; EU: November 26, 2004 Microsoft Windows; JP: August 12, 2005; EU: April 7, 2006; WW: September 5, 2014 (Steam) PlayStation Portable; JP: September 29, 2005 Xbox Originals June 16, 2008
- Genre: 2D weapon based fighting
- Modes: Single-player, Multiplayer
- Arcade system: Sega NAOMI GD-ROM

Guilty Gear X2 #Reload (released as Guilty Gear XX: The Midnight Carnival #Reload in Japan) (ギルティギア イグゼクス シャープリロード, Giruti Gia Iguzekusu Shāpu Rirōdo; pronounced "Sharp Reload") is the first updated version of Guilty Gear X2. Adjustments on balance high-level play were made and Robo-Ky, whose moveset was heavily reworked from vanilla X2, was made playable from the beginning. The number of challenges in Mission Mode was increased to 100, Survival Mode has 1000 levels in #Reload, and the player can damage the enemy normally or perform combos to gain next level quicker. #Reload also featured a comprehensive training mode sans combo demos or tutorials, creating a Watch option where one can allow the CPU to take over and fight the CPU. It also first featured the COUNTER option to allow practicing attacks on the opponent as counterhits, which usually mean greater damage and different properties.

#Reload first released on March 26, 2003 in the Japanese arcades, and on July 31, 2003, for PlayStation 2 (PS2). Later, it was ported to Xbox, Windows, and PlayStation Portable (PSP), being released on April 29, 2004 by Microsoft, on July 23, 2004 by Media Kite, and September 29, 2005 by Sega, respectively. It was also released in the Xbox Live service "Xbox Originals" on June 16, 2008. Majesco acquired its rights in later April 2004, and published the Xbox's version in North America on September 14, 2004. The rights to its European release were acquired by Zoo Digital Publishing (now Zushi Games), which released it for PS2 and Xbox on November 26, 2004 and for Windows on April 7, 2006. On September 5, 2014, it was released on the Steam digital distribution platform for Windows PCs. The South Korean release was the most singular, because it included a new soundtrack composed by Korean musician Shin Hae Chul, and featured all synth. However, the rock and metal theme of the series' music remains in this soundtrack, as well. It also added Korean voices, marking the 2nd game in the franchise to have a Korean dub, alongside Guilty Gear X Plus.

=== Reception ===
Reception

Aggregate scores
Aggregator	Score
GameRankings	85.02%
Metacritic	86/100

Guilty Gear X2 #Reload's PS2 version sold 91,130 copies, and the PSP version sold 31,910 copies. Reviews for its Xbox version were generally positive, with aggregate scores of 85.02% from GameRankings, and 86/100 from Metacritic. Guilty Gear X2 #Reload was praised for its graphics; GamePro stated "The 2D-animation cel-like graphics are simply gorgeous and animate smoothly", while PALGN commented that its "[e]xcellent character design combined with some visually appealing backgrounds make GGX2:Reload one of the best looking 2D games ever." IGN said it "offers a solid framerate (even online), lush visuals, and an incredible amount of gameplay depth." G4 stated that "this is both a great fighting game and a great addition to the Xbox library." In addition to the several features, including the option to play multiplayer matches in Xbox Live, reviewers noted its price in North America as a reason to buy the game, giving high scores to it. ScrewAttack ranked it the tenth best fighting game of all time in 2007.

It received runner-up placements in GameSpot's 2004 "Best Fighting Game" and "Best Budget Game" award categories across all platforms.

== Guilty Gear XX Slash ==
Guilty Gear XX Slash
- Developer: Arc System Works
- Publisher: JP: Sega (Arcade, PS2)
- Series: Guilty Gear
- Platforms: Arcade, PlayStation 2
- Release: JP: September 28, 2005 (Arcade); JP: April 13, 2006 (PS2); JP: March 15, 2007 (Sega the Best)
- Genre: 2D weapons–based fighting
- Modes: Single-player, Multiplayer
- Arcade system: Sega NAOMI GD-ROM

Guilty Gear XX Slash (ギルティギア イグゼクス スラッシュ, Giruti Gia Iguzekusu Surasshu) is the second updated version of Guilty Gear X2. Once again, the game's balance was reworked by changing properties of certain moves and including new moves for some of the characters; GameSpot noted "the game seems to be balanced better than its predecessors." Two new characters were introduced to the game, these being A.B.A, who debuted in Guilty Gear Isuka, and Order-Sol, who is Sol Badguy with an entirely different costume, and moveset. It was first released on September 28, 2005 for the arcades in Japan. In December 2005, it was reported that it would be ported for PS2, which occurred on April 13, 2006. This version was the best-selling title for PS2 in its debut week, being fifth overall; it sold 87,414 copies in Japan as of December 31, 2006. It was later re-released under "Sega the Best" collection on March 17, 2007.

== Guilty Gear XX Accent Core ==
Guilty Gear XX Accent Core
- Developer: Arc System Works
- Publishers: JP: Arc System Works (Arcade, PS2, Wii); NA: Aksys Games (PS2, Wii); EU: 505 Games (Wii)
- Series: Guilty Gear
- Platforms: Arcade, PlayStation 2, Wii
- Release: December 20, 2006: Arcade; JP: December 20, 2006 PlayStation 2; JP: May 31, 2007; NA: September 11, 2007 Wii; JP: July 26, 2007; NA: October 16, 2007; EU: February 29, 2008; AU: March 6, 2008
- Genre: 2D weapons–based fighting
- Modes: Single-player, Multiplayer
- Arcade system: Sega NAOMI GD-ROM

Guilty Gear XX Accent Core (ギルティギア イグゼクス アクセントコア, Giruti Gia Iguzekusu Akusento Koa) is the third version of Guilty Gear X2. In addition to balance changes, Accent Core features a new type of special move, the "Force Break," which uses 25% of the tension gauge. It also introduces moves that make opponents stick briefly to walls or slide across the floor of a stage. New additions also include "Slashback," a form of parrying with reduced block stun, and throw breaks. Both versions of the game feature three gameplay modes per character, based on the Guilty Gear, Guilty Gear X, and Accent Core fighting systems. Accent Core also underwent a major aesthetic change for the series. In addition to a new opening movie, and a redesigned menu, all voices, including that of the announcer, have been re-recorded (or replaced with previously unused samples), sometimes by different actors. The playable character artwork was also redone, and new background songs were added. On the other hand, the Story Mode, as well as Justice and Kliff were removed.

It was first released to Japanese arcades on December 20, 2006. A home console version on PS2 was released on May 31, 2007. A Wii version of this game was released on July 26, 2007, complete with support for the Classic Controller and Nintendo GameCube controller, along with a setup using both the Wii Remote and Nunchuk. Some bugs were reported in the Japanese PS2 version of the game, and Aksys Games announced they would fix them for the American release. Aksys would later release the PS2 and Wii versions on their respective dates (September 11, 2007 and October 16, 2007). The publishing rights for the Wii was acquired by 505 Games in October 2007, and released it in Europe on February 29, 2008. 505 Games also published it on Australia for Wii on March 6, 2008.

=== Reception ===
Reception

Aggregate scores
Aggregator	Score
GameRankings	PS2: 78.75% Wii: 74.88%
Metacritic	PS2: 77/100; Wii: 75/100

Its PS2 version sold 50,983 copies in Japan as of December 30, 2007. Reviews for it were generally positive; aggregate-review websites GameRankings and Metacritic rated the PS2 version 78.75% and 77/100, and the Wii version 74.88% and 75/100. It was elected the tenth best PS2 game by IGN's Ryan Clements, who also did a review which put it among the IGN's "top ten highest rated PS2 games" of 2007. Although he called it "a great game", Clements noted it as "a remastered version of the original", and thus not "the next big Guilty Gear game" the fans were waiting for. GameDaily said it "may not have changed the recipe, but the meal is just as appetizing"; GameSpot wrote that the new features made the gameplay "a bit more interesting", while Game Informer labeled it as a "fresh wave" and "solid" changes. In IGN "Best of 2007", it was elected the best fighting game on PS2, and was a runner-up in the category of best fighting game in all consoles. On the other hand, the Wii version was heavily criticized due to its controls. Nintendo Life qualified it as a "terrible motion-sensitive control", and IGN gave it a 5.9 score in contrast to an 8.5 score given in the PS2 version.

== Guilty Gear XX Accent Core Plus ==
Guilty Gear XX Accent Core Plus
- Developer: Arc System Works
- Publishers: JP: Arc System Works (PS2); NA: Aksys Games (PS2, PSP, Wii); EU: Zen United and PQube (PS2, PSP, Wii)
- Series: Guilty Gear
- Platforms: PlayStation 2, PlayStation Portable, Wii, Xbox 360, PlayStation 3
- Release: March 27, 2008: PlayStation 2; JP: March 27, 2008; NA: April 6, 2009; EU: 3 December 2010 PlayStation Portable; JP: July 24, 2008; NA: April 6, 2009; EU: May 20, 2011 Wii; NA: May 12, 2009; EU: May 20, 2011 Xbox 360 (digital release); WW: October 24, 2012 PlayStation 3 (digital release); JP: November 1, 2012; NA: December 4, 2012
- Genre: 2D Weapon Based Fighting
- Modes: Single-player, Multiplayer

Guilty Gear XX Accent Core Plus (ギルティギア イグゼクス アクセントコア プラス, Giruti Gia Iguzekusu Akusento Koa Purasu) is the fourth version of Guilty Gear X2, and an enhanced version of Accent Core. No changes to the battle system have been made, but new features were added. Features include Kliff and Justice's return, with appropriate changes and additions, the return of Mission Mode, a new Survival Mode with level-up features, a new Gallery Mode with new illustrations, and bug fixes, rebalances, and tune ups from the previous version. It also features a new Story Mode. However all the in-game blood was removed and instead was replaced with more action/impact effects. The story is a continuation of the storyline from Guilty Gear X2. All characters have a storyline, and the stories cover the major events involving the mystery of Gears, "That Man" and conflict with the Post-War Administration Bureau.

It was first released on March 27, 2008 for the PS2, along with an "Append Edition" released on the same day. A version for the PSP with 3-on-3 tag matches was released on July 24, 2008 in Japan. A downloadable version through the PlayStation Store was also released on PSP on September 24, 2009. Aksys released it for the American market on April 6, 2009 for the PS2 and PSP, and on May 12 for the Wii. It was released for PS2 in Europe on November 26, 2010 by Zen United, which also released the Wii and PSP versions on May 20, 2011. Arc System Works released an Xbox 360 (via Xbox Live Arcade) version worldwide on October 24, 2012, and the PlayStation 3 (via PlayStation Network) version on November 1, 2012 in Japan. The PSN version was released in North America on December 4, 2012.

=== Reception ===
Reception

Aggregate scores
Aggregator	Score
GameRankings	PS2: 82.67% PSP: 78% X360: 72.89% PS3: 74.57% Wii: 78%
Metacritic	X360: 74/100; PS3: 75/100; Wii: 76/100

Its PS2 version sold 28,867 copies in Japan as of December 28, 2008, and has an aggregate score of 82.67% from GameRankings, which assigns a score of 78% on the PSP version. The Xbox 360 version has generally received mixed reviews, while the PlayStation 3 and Wii versions has generally received positive ones, with aggregating review websites GameRankings and Metacritic assigning the Xbox 360 version 72.89% and 74/100, the PlayStation 3 version 74.57% and 75/100, and the Wii version 78% and 76/100.

Clements affirmed, "Somewhat less glamorous than previous Guilty Gears, Accent Core Plus still has a polished feel and an interesting universe." He said the graphics and the music may be "a little old," but "it's still highly entertaining;" the visual on PSP, however, were criticized for being "a bit fuzzy" compared to the PS2. He also felt "the standard nunchuck setup just doesn't work", saying the Wii version can only be enjoyed with a Classic Controller. Although called it "an enjoyable experience" for two players, Richard Li from 1UP.com criticized the lack of "online matchmaking", as well as the "mostly nonsensical, ridiculous, and/or unexciting" story mode and the some times "overly frustrating" mission mode for its difficulty.

While deemed it "a good value", Official Xbox Magazine's Heidi Kemps said it is difficult for newcomers and that the "super-basic matchmaking and sometimes-laggy online play are also disappointing." Similarly, Chris Sculion of Official Nintendo Magazine said "it's not very user-friendly" but "you'll find there's a fantastic fighting game hidden inside." Vincent Ingenito of IGN said it is "arguably the best game to ever bear the name", and Matthew Codd of NZGamer stressed, "Poor online play doesn't stop you from getting a few mates around for an old fashioned side-by-side slugfest." Both NGamer and Nintendo Power commend the possibility of playing it several times, with the former labeling it "An absorbing, tactically rich fighter with endless replay value."

== Guilty Gear XX Accent Core Plus R ==
Guilty Gear XX Accent Core Plus R
- Developer: Arc System Works
- Publisher: Arc System Works
- Series: Guilty Gear
- Platforms: Arcade, PlayStation Vita, PlayStation 3, Xbox 360, Microsoft Windows, Nintendo Switch
- Release: September 20, 2012: Arcade; JP: September 20, 2012; JP: January 18, 2013 (version 1.10) PlayStation Vita; JP: March 19, 2013; NA: April 23, 2013; EU: February 14, 2013 PlayStation 3 (digital release); JP: August 7, 2013; NA: March 3, 2014 Xbox 360 (digital release); WW: October 11, 2013 Microsoft Windows (digital release); WW: May 26, 2015 Nintendo Switch; WW: May 16, 2019 (digital release in NA)
- Arcade system: RingEdge 2

Guilty Gear XX Accent Core Plus R (ギルティギア イグゼクス アクセントコア プラス アール, Giruti Gia Iguzekusu Akusento Koa Purasu Āru) is the fifth and latest updated version of Guilty Gear X2. The game's balance was reworked again and in-game bosses Kliff and Justice are also balanced for regular play. It was first released on September 20, 2012 to the Sega's arcade system board RingEdge 2. A new version of the game with changes known as Guilty Gear XX Accent Core Plus R version 1.10 was released on January 18, 2013. Guilty Gear XX: Accent Core Plus R was released on the PlayStation Vita in Japan on March 19, 2013 as an exclusively downloadable game. It was released in Europe on February 14, 2013 and in North America on April 23, 2013. A patch to update the PS3 version of Guilty Gear XX Accent Core Plus to Plus R was released on the Japanese PlayStation Store on August 7, 2013 and globally for Xbox Live on October 11, 2013. This patch was made available for North American PSN users on March 3, 2014. A PC port was released on May 26, 2015 via Steam, and was updated December 22, 2020 to add rollback netcode via GGPO. A Nintendo Switch port was digitally released worldwide on May 16, 2019.

=== Reception ===
Reception

Aggregate scores
Aggregator	Score
GameRankings	Vita: 67.00%
Metacritic	Vita: 69/100; PC: 75/100

Guilty Gear XX Accent Core Plus R for PS Vita has received "mixed or average reviews", according to Metacritic, which assigns an average score of 69/100, while GameRankings assigns 67% of approval. It was largely criticized for its lack of an online mode; Ingenito stated, "Both mechanically and visually, Guilty Gear XX Accent Core Plus R is an excellent fighter" but that it "feel[s] incomplete". Destructoid's Chris Carter wrote, "I'm pretty torn on the review given the omission of such a major function, but ultimately Guilty Gear is a great game, and that core was preserved here." Pocket Gamer's Peter Willington deemed it as neither good for newcomers due to its difficulty, nor for people used to the series, as "it's doubtful the tweaks to character moves or minimal additional content will be worth the price of admission if you own a copy on another platform." Bradly Hale of Hardcore Gamer also did not considered it worth buying for people who own the previous Core Plus due to its lack of online play, though he commented, "Its mechanics, its mode, its style and presentation are all top notch." However, the balance among the roster of characters was praised by Ingenito and Carter.
