= Chronicles of Teddy: Harmony of Exidus =

2015 action-adventure video game

- Developer: Storybird Games
- Publishers: Windows, macOS; LookAtMyGame, Plug In Digital; PlayStation 4, Wii U; Aksys Games; Nintendo Switch; Storybird Games
- Platforms: Windows macOS; PlayStation 4 Wii U Nintendo Switch
- Release: Windows, macOS; April 2, 2015; PlayStation 4; March 29, 2016; Wii U; March 31, 2016; Nintendo Switch; April 16, 2020
- Genres: Platform-adventure, metroidvania
- Mode: Single-player

Chronicles of Teddy: Harmony of Exidus, known in its original Windows release as Finding Teddy 2, is a 2015 action-adventure platform game created by French indie studio Storybird Games.

== Plot ==
A young girl enters a portal leading from her house into a fantasy world to save her friend and the land from evil. After this set-up, exposition is minimal and the narrative must largely be inferred with environmental clues, as the NPCs speak in musical notes, which can eventually be translated by finding musical runes.

== Gameplay ==
Chronicles of Teddy is a side-scrolling action-adventure game in which the player controls a girl who is initially equipped with a weak sword. Although she can initially do little but run and jump, she will eventually be able to purchase various equipment and items that will upgrade her abilities. Many of these items can be bought in shops by spending marbles, which are the in-universe currency. As NPC dialogue is largely indecipherable until later in the game, the player must discover many aspects of the world, including game mechanics, menus, etc., through experimentation.

== Reception ==
Chronicles of Teddy received positive reviews, currently sitting at 79/100 on Metacritic. PlayStation LifeStyle gave the game 8.5/10, calling it a "huge, gorgeous adventure by any reasonable standards, and while retro gamers will probably get a kick out of it more than anyone, it's not content to rest on its laurels and exploit nostalgia." It particularly praised the game's art, writing that, "This is a truly beautiful game, one in which every screen — from the smallest dungeon room to the largest overworld area — has its own identity forged from the intricate details around it." However, it criticized the game's "'learn by playing' approach", which it said "backfire[s] when it comes to some of the game's less-intuitive puzzles". Nintendo Life awarded it 6/10 and concluded it was a "somewhat satisfying puzzle platforming adventure game", praising the "gorgeous retro-inspired pixel art" but denouncing the "combat system that interrupts the flow of gameplay, and lots of backtracking from dungeon to dungeon can make the game feel slow and tedious in spots." Hardcore Gamer scored it 3/5, saying that a "lack of any direction permeates the title", nevertheless, it added that "the game can still be fun. Just like a good exploratory action/adventure game, the feeling of revisiting old areas with new powers to get at previously unobtainable treasures is exciting."
