= Spirit Hunter: Death Mark II =

2022 adventure video game

- Official game cover in English
- Developer: Experience
- Publishers: JP: Experience; WW: Aksys Games
- Director: Ataka Motoya
- Producer: Hajime Chikami
- Artists: Fumiya Sumio; Kazuhiro Oya
- Series: Spirit Hunter
- Platforms: Nintendo Switch; PlayStation 4; PlayStation 5; Windows
- Release: Nintendo Switch: JP: December 1, 2022; WW: February 15, 2024; PlayStation 4: JP: December 1, 2022; PlayStation 5, Windows: WW: February 15, 2024
- Genre: Adventure
- Mode: Single-player

Spirit Hunter: Death Mark II (known in Japan as Shinigami: Shibito Magire (Note: Japanese: 死噛 シビト マギレ; "Shinigami: Corpse Confusion")) is a horror-themed adventure game developed and published by Experience. It is the third entry in the Spirit Hunter series, following 2017's Spirit Hunter: Death Mark and 2018's Spirit Hunter: NG. The game was released for Nintendo Switch and PlayStation 4 on December 1, 2022 in Japan, and was released by Aksys Games for Nintendo Switch, PlayStation 5 and Windows on February 15, 2024 worldwide.

The story is set in a Tokyo suburb, and sees the player take the role of Kazuo Yashiki, who is hired to infiltrate a school as a teacher to investigate gruesome, spiritual incidents that occur there every ten years. Like previous Spirit Hunter games, it is an adventure game, but it also incorporates elements from tabletop role-playing games. The player investigates areas in a side-view perspective together with a number of partner characters; the choice of partner determines which locations the player has access to.

The game is directed by Ataka Motoya and produced by Hajime Chikami, and was financed through a crowdfunding campaign.

== Gameplay ==
In Death Mark II, players sometimes need to make a choice in order to progress.

Spirit Hunter: Death Mark II is an adventure game in which the player investigates areas in a side-view perspective.

The investigations are conducted together with one of several partner characters; depending on which is chosen, the player has access to different locations and items. Each character has a set of statistics, which in the player character's case can be increased. These are used to affect outcomes in dangerous situations, such as when being attacked by a spirit, in a system called Suspensive Act.

== Plot ==
Shibito Magire is set in a suburb of H City in Tokyo, and revolves around Konoehara Academy, where gruesome events occur every ten years. The police are unable to explain the incidents, and classify them as accidents, but they are rumored to be caused by spirits.

Because of this, Konoehara's principal hires Kazuo Yashiki of the Kujo family to infiltrate the school as a teacher and investigate the incidents.

== Development ==
Spirit Hunter: Death Mark II is developed by Experience, and is directed by Ataka Motoya and produced by Hajime Chikami, with character designs by Fumiya Sumio and concept art by Kazuhiro Oya. The development was financed through a crowdfunding campaign on the website Campfire, which began on November 25, 2019, with a goal of 15 million yen (approximately US$140,000), which was reached on December 29 with 17 days remaining of the campaign. The campaign also had further goals on top of the base goal, going up to 30 million yen, all of which were reached and thus allowed for production of a larger amount of art assets and voice-overs, added gameplay features, the addition of returning Spirit Hunter series characters, a new story expansion, and a novelization.

The game has a new theme and concept compared to previous Spirit Hunter games: the developers describe the theme as "a gloomy horror with suspense-based mystery", compared to the previous games' "spirit suspense horror", and the concept as "suspense that offers a new feeling of exploration and helplessness through changing perspectives", compared to "a new horror experience that succeeds the previous game". While it like previous Spirit Hunter games is an adventure game, it also incorporates elements inspired by tabletop role-playing games, such as character statistics that affect the success rates of certain actions.

== Release ==
Shibito Magire and its crowdfunding campaign were announced by Experience in September 2019 through their YouTube channel, along with a number of concept art pieces. It was published by Experience on December 1 2022, in Japan, for the Nintendo Switch and PlayStation 4, following multiple delays to allow for further quality improvements. A PlayStation Vita version was ruled out due to a lack of support for the system from the manufacturer.

Aksys Games are planning to publish the game internationally in Late February 2024. Initially announced for release on the same platforms in addition to Windows, the western PlayStation 4 version was cancelled in favor of the PlayStation 5 version in August 2023. The PS5/Nintendo Switch version in North America was released on February 15, 2024. They included a soundtrack CD.

== Reception ==
=== Sales ===
Famitsu reported that Death Mark II sold 3,836 copies in Japan after it was released.
