= Mind Zero =

2013 video game

MIND≒0
- North American cover art featuring Kei Takanashi, the game's protagonist
- Developers: Acquire, ZeroDiv
- Publishers: JP: GungHo Online Entertainment; NA/EU: Aksys Games
- Composer: Zizz Studio
- Platforms: PlayStation Vita, Microsoft Windows
- Release: PlayStation Vita: JP: August 1, 2013; NA: May 27, 2014; EU: May 28, 2014; Microsoft Windows: WW: March 8, 2016
- Genres: Role-playing, dungeon crawler
- Mode: Single-player

Mind Zero, stylized MIND≒0, (Japanese: マインド/ゼロ, Hepburn: Maindo/Zero) is a dungeon crawler role-playing video game developed for the PlayStation Vita. It was developed jointly by Acquire and Class of Heroes developer ZeroDiv, and published by GungHo Online Entertainment. It was released in Japan on August 1, 2013, and in May 2014 in Europe and North America by Aksys Games.

== Gameplay ==
The premise of the game has received many comparisons to the Persona series of role-playing video games. The game's dialogue is fully voiced and takes place in 2D, similar to that of a visual novel, while the game's battle system consists of 3D computer graphics and turn-based battles.

== Story ==
The game takes place in two different "worlds"; the real world, and a "crazy spiritual world". The real world aspect of the game is set in Japan, in the regions Saitama, Akihabara, Yokohama, Amamiya and Nippori. The story is simple, revolving around a high school student, Kei Takanashi, and a group of other high school students who stumble into the outer realm, and begin battling other MINDS and MIND Users to help protect and save people.

== Development ==
The game was first announced in March 2013 in an issue of Famitsu. It was announced to be in development jointly by Acquire and Class of Heroes developer ZeroDiv. As of announcement, the game was reported to be 70% complete. The game was scheduled for release on August 1, 2013 in Japan, and was the first game released by publisher GungHo Online Entertainment since buying out Acquire in 2012. After the existence of a pre-order spot for the game was noted at websites such as GameStop in January 2014, Aksys Games formally announced the game for a physical and digital release in North America, and a digital-only release in Europe, on 30 January. The game was later greenlit via the Steam Greenlight voting system and is now available for PC via Steam.

== Reception ==
Reception

Aggregate score
| Aggregator | Score |
|---|---|
| Metacritic | Vita: 59/100 |

Review scores
| Publication | Score |
|---|---|
| GameSpot | 4/10 |
| Hardcore Gamer | 4/5 |
| IGN | 7.0/10 |
| RPGamer | 3.0/5 |
| HonestGamers | 2.0/5 (PC) |

Upon release, Mind Zero has received mixed reception. Hardcore Gamer said that "For a game without any kind of established lineage, this is a very welcome addition to the Vita’s growing JRPG library.", whereas IGN praised the title for its battle system and voice acting but criticized it for repetitive dungeons and poor writing. GameSpot was much more critical, citing repetitive gameplay and that the game "fails at anything beyond being occasionally mediocre.". HonestGamers later reviewed the PC version released through Steam and, amongst over things, criticized it for being a low-quality port from the Vita.
