= Olympia Soirée =

2020 video game

- Developer: Idea Factory (Otomate)
- Publishers: JP: Idea Factory; NA/EU: Aksys Games
- Platforms: Nintendo Switch, iOS, Android
- Release: Nintendo Switch: JP: April 16, 2020; NA/EU: September 9, 2021; iOS, Android: JP: April 15, 2021
- Genres: Visual novel, otome game
- Mode: Single-player

Olympia Soirée is a 2020 otome game and visual novel.

== Synopsis ==
Players assume the role of a girl known as Olympia, the only known surviving member of the White, a lineage of women from Tennyo Island whose dancing for the goddess Amaterasu ensures the sun continues to shine. On Tenguu Island, where Olympia has lived for many years, there is a caste system separating people by the colors of their hair and eyes, where people of the primary colors are of higher status, and people are typically allowed to marry only if their colors are of similar status. On her eighteenth birthday, Olympia is told by the director of a Tenguu Island government organization that she must find a husband of any color within one year so that she can give birth to a child of the White who can continue her duties.

== Development and release ==
Olympia Soirée was released for the Nintendo Switch console in Japan on April 16, 2020, and Aksys Games released an English version of the game on September 9, 2021.

On April 15, 2021, the game was released in Japan for Android and iOS devices through the Otomate Selection program.

A fan disc, Olympia Soirée -Catharsis-, was released for the Nintendo Switch in Japan on December 18, 2025, and is set to be released in English by Aksys Games in 2027.

The theme song CD "Olympia Soiree Theme SONGS" was released by Capriccio Music Records on April 16, 2020.

== Reception ==
Reception

Aggregate score
Aggregator	Score
Metacritic	80/100

Review scores
Publication	Score
Hardcore Gamer	4.5/5
Nintendo World Report	7.5/10
RPGFan	93/100
Digitally Downloaded	4.5/5
Siliconera	6/10

Olympia Soirée received "generally favorable" reviews, according to the review aggregator website Metacritic.
