= Family Slot Car Racing =

2009 racing video game

- Developer(s): Arc System Works
- Publisher(s): Aksys Games
- Platform(s): WiiWare
- Release: JP: February 10, 2009; PAL: August 14, 2009; NA: August 17, 2009
- Genre(s): Racing
- Mode(s): Single-player, Multiplayer

Family Slot Car Racing (Okiraku Slot Car Racing in Japan) is a racing game developed by Arc System Works for WiiWare. It was released in Japan on February 10, 2009, in PAL regions on August 14, 2009, and in North America on August 17, 2009.

== Gameplay ==
Like other games in the Family series, players choose a member of a family, including a mother, father, son (Billy), and daughter (Sarah), to play as. The game sees players racing slot cars against an opponent across four circuits, each with several track configurations. The game features a number of slot cars to choose from, each with different attributes in acceleration, speed and grip, with additional cars unlockable as they progress through the game.

The game features very simple controls, with players only using the A button on the Wii Remote to make their slot car accelerate and letting it go to slow down. The skill in playing the game comes from determining when to slow down around corners so the player's car doesn't fly off the track, and when they should use their limited turbo boosts during the race.

Along with the single-player mode, the game features a two-player versus mode and a time attack mode. The game also features a minigame similar to roulette in which players race around a track to try to accumulate a score that matches or exceeds a goal score.

== Reception ==
Nintendo Life thought Family Slot Car Racing was an accessible game but suffered from bare-bones presentation and believed its inherent faithfulness to the hobby may limit its audience.
