= Mon-Yu =

- Developers: Experience, Inc. (Note: Additional development by Poppy Works.)
- Publishers: JP: Experience, Inc.; NA: Aksys Games; EU: Numskull Games; WW: Aksys Games (PC)
- Platforms: PlayStation 5, Nintendo Switch, Windows
- Release: Nintendo Switch, PS5: JP: July 15, 2021 (NS); NA: September 21, 2023; PAL: September 29, 2023; Windows: WW: September 21, 2023
- Genre: Dungeon crawler
- Mode: Single-player

Mon-Yu (Note: Full title: Mon-Yu: Defeat Monsters and Gain Strong Weapons and Armor. You May Be Defeated, but Don't Give Up. Become Stronger. I Believe There Will Be a Day When the Heroes Defeat the Devil King (Japanese: モンスターを倒して強い剣や鎧を手にしなさい。死んでも諦めずに強くなりなさい。勇者隊が魔王を倒すその日を信じています。, Hepburn: Monster wo Taoshite Tsuyoi Ken ya Yoroi wo Te ni Shinasai. Shindemo Akiramezu ni Tsuyoku Narinasai. Yuusha Tai ga Maou wo Taosu Sono Hi wo Shinjiteimasu)) is the shortened title of a first-person dungeon crawler video game developed by Tokyo-based studio Experience, Inc. and published by Aksys Games in the West. It was released in 2023 for PlayStation 5, Nintendo Switch and Windows. Its isekai-based story revolves around warriors from other worlds who are summoned to the land of Tir Na Balc in order to defeat the evil Devil King. The game received mixed reviews from critics, who noted that besides its unusually long name, it was otherwise fairly generic. Decrying its lack of depth, basic story and standard fantasy setting, reviewers called the game likely targeting and best suited for beginners to the genre.

== Reception ==
Reception

Review scores
Publication	Score
RPGFan	50/100
TouchArcade	3.5/5

Jenni Lada of Siliconera called the game's Nintendo Switch version "an enjoyable adventure", comparing its high difficulty and use of unique, powerful on-map enemies to the Etrian Odyssey series. She called the game's tone "pleasant", noting the ability to save anywhere made it more forgiving to newcomers. Shaun Musgrave of TouchArcade had a differing opinion, calling it far easier than other turn-based dungeon RPGs, though still noting it was "not a walk in the park". He said that despite its beginner-friendly mechanics, its onboarding for new players was weak.

Ben Love of RPGFan gave one of the most negative reviews, calling the game "excruciatingly bog-standard". He described it as "mind-numbingly dull" for experienced players, while giving new players no reason to pick it up. While praising the game's art as "beautiful", he nevertheless called strategies "limited" due to its lack of depth, and criticized death as inconsequential, as the player does not lose anything besides progress in the dungeon. He said that while the game attempts to be more approachable for newcomers, it removed much of what made the genre appealing.
