= Family Go-Kart Racing =

Racing video game

Family Go-Kart Racing is a racing video game developed and published by Japanese game developer Arc System Works. The game is part of Arc's Family series, which is a collection of Family themed games, exclusive to WiiWare. The game is a typical racing game, with the 6 playable characters (Billy, Sarah, Mommy, Daddy, Auntie and Gramps) being part of the same family.

== Gameplay ==
The game features 12 unique courses, and 6 unique vehicles, each one with different stats (Acceleration, Grip and Stability). Items can be collected throughout every race, and can be used to get boosts or slow down other players, similar to Nintendo's Mario Kart series. The game supports 4 player local multiplayer. There are two main modes: Grand Prix, which has players race in 4 courses in a row, and Time Trial, where players compete to get the fastest time on any course.

== Reception ==
Family Go-Kart Racing was received poorly among critics. The game's only review on Metacritic, via Nintendo Life's Spencer Mcllvaine, calls it "completely unplayable" and "as cheap as entertainment gets". Nintendo Life gave it a 1 out of 10.
