= Xblaze Lost: Memories =

2015 video game

- Left to right: "Nobody", "Me", and Es
- Developer: Arc System Works
- Publishers: JP: Arc System Works; NA: Aksys Games
- Director: Hiroaki Masuzawa
- Producer: Toshimichi Mori
- Artist: Konomi Higuchi
- Composer: Kikuo
- Series: BlazBlue
- Platforms: PlayStation 3, PlayStation Vita, Microsoft Windows
- Release: JP: April 9, 2015; NA: August 11, 2015; EU: June 21, 2016; Microsoft Windows: WW: August 11, 2016
- Genre: Visual novel
- Mode: Single-player

Xblaze Lost: Memories (エクスブレイズ ロスト：メモリーズ, EkusuBureizu Rosuto: Memorīzu) is a sequel to the 2013 visual novel Xblaze Code: Embryo developed by Arc System Works. It was released in Japan for the PlayStation 3 and PlayStation Vita on April 9, 2015, in North America on August 11, 2015 and in Europe on June 21, 2016 by Aksys Games. The Microsoft Windows's version was released worldwide on August 11, 2016.

== Gameplay ==
The protagonist unintentionally wanders into a mysterious alternate world known as the "Phantom Field" while searching for her missing sister. The Phantom Field is a strange place full of shifting pathways and traps to snare the unwary. Strange crystalline objects known as “Memory Fragments” are strewn throughout this place. In order to move on to the deeper levels of the field, players will have to find and gather these mysterious artifacts. Once you have gathered a certain number of Memory Fragments and make your way to the end of the level you're on, Nobody will appear to quiz you on what you've learned.

=== Main characters ===
All characters from Code: Embryo return in Lost Memories. In addition, the following characters are introduced:

- Me
- Nobody
- Little Sister
- Kiri
- Brain Cat/Freaks

== Reception ==
It has a score of 63% on Metacritic. PlayStation LifeStyle awarded it a score of 7.5 out of 10, saying "XBlaze Lost: Memories is a huge step in the right direction for the series, and is a very enjoyable read."
