= Xblaze Code: Embryo =

2013 video game

- From top left: Sechs, Hinata, Touya, Kuon, Es, and Mei
- Developer: Arc System Works
- Publishers: JP: Arc System Works; NA: Aksys Games; EU: Funbox Media
- Composer: Kikuo
- Series: BlazBlue
- Platforms: PlayStation 3, PlayStation Vita, Microsoft Windows
- Release: PlayStation 3, PlayStation Vita: JP: July 25, 2013; NA: June 24, 2014; EU: September 18, 2015; Microsoft Windows: WW: March 1, 2016
- Genre: Visual novel
- Mode: Single-player

Xblaze Code: Embryo (エクスブレイズ コード：エンブリオ, EkusuBureizu Kōdo: Enburio) is a prequel visual novel of the fighting game series BlazBlue by Arc System Works. It was released in Japan for the PlayStation 3 and PlayStation Vita on July 25, 2013 and North America on June 24, 2014 by Aksys Games. The Microsoft Windows's version was released worldwide on March 1, 2016. A sequel titled Xblaze Lost: Memories has been released for the PS3 and Vita in 2015 and on Windows in 2016.

== Synopsis ==
The story follows Touya Kagari, a sophomore at the prestigious Hakuou North Academy and a resident of Shin Yokozaki City. An earnest and responsible student, Touya initially leads an ordinary life. However, his life changes when he hears a mysterious sound coming from the Restricted Ward, an abandoned area of the city that has remained off-limits since a catastrophic disaster occurred there ten years earlier.

Driven by curiosity, Touya enters the ruins and travels deeper into the Restricted Ward. There, he discovers an injured man and approaches him to offer assistance. Instead of accepting Touya's help, the man suddenly attacks him, accusing him of being an enemy. Touya soon finds himself caught in a series of bizarre and dangerous events involving mysterious ringing bells, violent individuals, and supernatural phenomena.

As Touya struggles to survive, he is rescued by a small girl wielding an enormous sword. Despite her delicate and seemingly fragile appearance, the girl demonstrates extraordinary combat abilities. She introduces herself as Es, a soldier affiliated with the Mitsurugi Agency.

Following his encounter with Es, Touya becomes involved in a hidden world far removed from his ordinary school life. He learns about Seithr, Drives, Unions, and various secretive organizations operating behind the scenes. As he becomes increasingly entangled in their conflicts, Touya discovers that danger can come from both enemies and supposed allies.

=== Main characters ===
- Touya Kagari, in addition to being naturally curious, he also is incredibly kind and compassionate. Despite his calm demeanor, he will charge head long into any fights he sees in order to stop them. Currently lives with the Himezuru family and works part-time at the curry restaurant Maha Raja.
- Hinata Himezuru, the younger sister of the Himezuru family, of which Touya is unofficially a member. Incredibly friendly and cheerful, she always looks like she's enjoying life. She is the de facto head of the household as her older sister Yuki, who is a doctor, is always at work. However, she truly enjoys housework, especially cooking.
- Es, an anti-ability warrior (aka Sleipnir) attached to the Mitsurugi Agency. Outside of combat operations, she is shockingly naive and ignorant about the world around her. She rarely speaks or shows her emotions. In addition to her fighting prowess, she can also detect Discover Calls.
- Kuon Glamred Stroheim, an apprentice at the Academy located on the isle of Ishana. A daughter of the powerful Stroheim family, she has no tolerance for malfeasance and her tendency to white knight frequently gets her in trouble. Her temper is legendary, earning her the nickname "Fire Empress Stroheim". Due to her potential strength, most believe she will be the first in a long while to earn the right to become a Ten Sage.
- Mei Amanohokosaka, grudgingly works with the Mitsurugi Agency. The scion of the Amanohokosaka clan, she has been hunting Unions since she was a child. As a result, she is far more mature than her peers and often has problems relating to them. She practices a unique form of magic which she uses primarily to obtain information, though she will occasionally use her powers in combat.

== Reception ==
Reception

Aggregate scores
Aggregator	Score
GameRankings	(PSV) 55%
Metacritic	(PSV) 43/100

Review scores
Publication	Score
Famitsu	30/40
Pocket Gamer	6/10
USgamer	0.5/5
Gaming Age	B

On Metacritic the PlayStation Vita release of the game has a score of 43% based on reviews from 5 critics, indicating "generally unfavorable reviews".

Tom Farndon of Pocket Gamer UK wrote: "If you're a fan off the BlazBlue series, pick up a copy. If not, then you may want to avoid it unless a visual novel is exactly the experience you're looking for."
