= Family Glide Hockey =

2008 video game

- Developer(s): Arc System Works
- Publisher(s): Aksys Games
- Platform(s): Wii (WiiWare)
- Release: JP: October 21, 2008; NA: January 19, 2009; PAL: January 30, 2009
- Genre(s): Sports
- Mode(s): Single-player, Multiplayer

Family Glide Hockey (Okiraku Air Hockey Wii in Japan) is an air hockey video game developed by Arc System Works for WiiWare. It was released in Japan on October 21, 2008, and later released in North America on January 19, 2009 and the PAL regions on January 30, 2009.

== Gameplay ==
Similar to Family Table Tennis, players control a member of a family, including a mother, father, son (Billy), and daughter (Sarah), to play against another in a game of air hockey. The player can choose up to five settings, including a gymnasium, a forest park, a beach, an amusement park, and an arctic aquarium.

The game also features three minigames that involve the player trying the slam the puck into the goal while faced with different objectives, such as hitting targets or solving math problems.

== Reception ==
IGN summed up Family Glide Hockey as "a dull, awkwardly controlling air hockey game", but felt the minigames were marginally more fun than the core game.
