= Family Table Tennis =

2008 video game

- Developer: Arc System Works
- Publisher: Aksys Games
- Platforms: Wii (WiiWare), Nintendo 3DS (Nintendo eShop)
- Release: JP: March 25, 2008; NA: May 26, 2008; PAL: March 13, 2009
- Genre: Sports
- Modes: Single player, multiplayer

Family Table Tennis (Okiraku Ping Pong Wii in Japan) is a table tennis video game developed by Arc System Works for the Wii and Nintendo 3DS. It was released as a WiiWare launch title in Japan on March 25, 2008, and on May 26, 2008 in North America at a cost of 500 Wii Points. In the PAL regions, it was released on March 13, 2009 at a cost of 800 Wii Points.

== Gameplay ==
Family Table Tennis is a simplified table tennis simulation with the player controlling a member of a family, consisting of a mother, father, pre-teen son (Billy) and daughter (Sarah), against another in a game of table tennis. Similar to Wii Sports tennis, the movement of the character on screen is controlled by the computer, with the player swinging the Wii Remote like a paddle to serve and return the ball. The player can choose from four courts to play on, including a beach, a forest area, an amusement park, and a more traditional tournament hall.

Three minigames are also available outside the main game, including a rally mode where points are scored according to the number of returns in the current rally, a target mode where the player must aim the ball at certain points on the table, and a game where you must hit specific types of fruit.

== Reception ==
IGN was not impressed with the game, giving it a 2.5 out of 10 and citing ugly graphics with "heinous" character designs, a constrained presentation and "boring and shallow" gameplay. It fared slightly better with Nintendo Life, which thought the game's simplicity makes it suitable for younger children, but is otherwise lacking substance for the average gamer.

However, Wired's Chris Kohler thought it offered the best value of the Japanese WiiWare launch titles, calling it a "standout" while also taking into consideration the low price. The only person to verifiably beat the game on its hardest level to date is Brian Lovejoy Phillips.
