= Kanako Kondō =

Japanese voice actress (born 1981)

- 近藤 佳奈子
- Born: June 26, 1981 (age 45); Tokyo, Japan
- Occupations: Voice actress; singer
- Years active: 2002–present
- Agent: Re-max
- Children: 1
- Musical career
- Genre: Anison
- Instrument: Vocals
- Years active: 2010–present
- Label: Target Entertainment

Kanako Kondō (近藤 佳奈子, Kondō Kanako; born June 26, 1981) is a Japanese voice actress and singer. She voiced Noel Vermillion in BlazBlue.

== Personal life ==
In November 2020, it was announced that she got married and became pregnant. On April 24, 2021, she had announced on Twitter that she gave birth to her son.

== Filmography ==
=== Anime ===
List of voice performances in anime
Year	Title	Role	Notes	Source
2003	Di Gi Charat Nyo!	Buuko-chan		
2004	Galaxy Angel X	Various characters	4th series	
2005	Akahori Gedou Hour Rabuge	Kanako Beihua		
2005	Canvas 2: Niji Iro no Sketch		TV series	
2006	Poca Poca mori no rasukaru (ja:ぽかぽか森のラスカル)	Sue		
2006	Death Note	Kyoko, Noriko		
2008	Antique Bakery			
2010	Kigyō Ninja iga Shachō to Hisho Gāko 起業忍者 イガ社長と秘書ガーコ	Gāko	OVA	
2010	Ojarumaru			
2011	Penguindrum	Policewoman		
2012	Tanken Driland	Lala		
2012	Sengoku Collection	Jun Takahashi		
2012	Accel World	Manganese Blade		
2013	BlazBlue Alter Memory	Noel Vermillion, Lambda-11, Mu-12, Nu-13, others		
2013	Ojīchan ga nokoshite kureta mono ~ moete mo moenai? Moe nikui! おじいちゃんが残してくれたもの~燃えても燃えない?燃えにくい!	Aota		
	Chibi Maruko-chan			

=== Video games ===
List of voice performances in video games
Year	Title	Role	Notes	Source
2007	Tatchi de unō! DS タッチ・デ・ウノー!DS	Tomo		
2007	Disney Magical Dance (ディズニー)マジカルダンス			
2008–24	BlazBlue	Noel Vermillion, Lambda-11, Mu-12, Nu-13, others		
2011	Queen's Gate: Spiral Chaos	Noel Vermillion		
2011	Nazowaku 謎惑館~音の間に間に~	Kuri Otoko		
2013	Otometeki Koi Kakumei★Love Revo!! 100kg Kara Hajimaru → Koi Monogatari 乙女的恋愛革命★ラブレボ!!100 kg(ココ)からはじまる→恋物語	Rie Ogino	remake of Love Revo	
	Super Monkey Ball Party Excited Daishūgō	Yang-Yang		
	Puyo Puyo	Rulue		
	Galaxy Angel	Steline		

=== Drama CDs ===
List of voice performances in drama CDs and audio recordings
Title	Role	Notes	Source
BlazBlue	Noel Vermillion		
Aquarian Age 10th anniversary	Gillian		
七星魔導マフィン伝魔剣と姫君と暗黒卿の秘儀	Marimo, Soleil		
Science Boys: Our School Trip in Kyoto 理系男子。～ぼくらの修学旅行 in 京都～	Hanako Hanazawa		
Moe Sake Tom Rie series 萌え酒トムリエシリーズ	Ogin		

=== Dubbing ===
List of voice performances in film and television
Series	Role	Notes	Source
Satisfaction サティスファクション	Atareko		
Are You Scared?	Laura		
Herb	Bad schoolgirl		
Shadow	Rage		
NTSB: The Crash of Flight 323	Miriam		

== Discography ==
=== Albums ===
List of albums with selected chart positions
Release Date	Title	Catalogue Number (Japan)	Oricon	
Release Date	Title	Catalogue Number (Japan)	Peak position	Weeks charted
July 1, 2010	Pandora (mini-album)	GNCA-7154	233	1
January 25, 2012	Album♪	WMBM-0010A	183	1
August 21, 2013	Mirror	TQCJ-1018		
July 9, 2014	Prism	TQCJ-1020		
