= Izayoi =

Izayoi (written: 十六夜 lit. "Sixteenth Night"), is a Japanese family surname. Fictional people with the surname include:

- Izayoi, a character from the Japanese manga series Inuyasha
- Izayoi, alter ego of playable character Tsubaki Yayoi from the BlazBlue fighting game series.
- Sakamaki Izayoi, the main protagonist from the Japanese light novel series Problem Children are Coming from Another World, aren't they?
- Sakuya Izayoi, a character in Embodiment of Scarlet Devil from the video game series Touhou Project
- Miku Izayoi, a character from the a Japanese light novel series Date A Live
- Kyuemon Izayoi, also known as Kyuemon Shingetsu Kibaoni, a secondary villain from the 39th season of Super Sentai Series, Shuriken Sentai Ninninger
- Sonosuke Izayoi, a character from the second anime series based in the Danganronpa video game Danganronpa 3: The End of Hope's Peak Academy
- Nonomi Izayoi, a character from the mobile game Blue Archive
- Riko (also spelled Liko), a character from the anime series Witchy Pretty Cure! who takes on the last name Izayoi in the Non-Magical World.
