= BlazBlue: Clone Phantasma =

2012 video game

- Developer: Arc System Works
- Publisher: Arc System Works
- Series: BlazBlue
- Platform: Nintendo 3DS
- Release: JP: December 26, 2012; NA: August 21, 2014
- Genre: Fighting
- Modes: Single-player, Multiplayer

BlazBlue: Clone Phantasma, released in Japan as BlazBlue: Clonephantasma (ぶれいぶるー くろーんふぁんたずま, BureiBurū: Kurōnfantazuma), is a 2012 3D arena fighting video game developed by Arc System Works, released as an eShop application for the Nintendo 3DS. It is the sequel to BlayzBloo: Super Melee Brawlers Battle Royale. The game was released in Japan on December 26, 2012, and North America on August 21, 2014.

== Characters ==
- Ragna the Bloodedge
- Jin Kisaragi
- Noel Vermillion
- Rachel Alucard
- Taokaka
- Bang Shishigami
- Hazama
- Makoto Nanaya
- Platinum the Trinity
- Izayoi

== Reception ==
Reception

Aggregate score
| Aggregator | Score |
|---|---|
| Metacritic | 42/100 |

Review scores
| Publication | Score |
|---|---|
| Nintendo Life | 4/10 |
| Hardcore Gamer | 2/5 |

The game received “generally unfavorable reviews” according to the review aggregator Metacritic. Hardcore Gamer gave the game a 2/5, saying "Unless you love BlazBlue and short-burst, super basic brawlers enough to drop $5.99, this will be far too superficial an endeavor to warrant a purchase."
