= BlazBlue: Chrono Phantasma =

2012 video game

- Developer: Arc System Works
- Publishers: JP: Arc System Works; NA: Aksys Games; EU: PQube
- Designers: Toshimichi Mori; Yūki Katō
- Composer: Daisuke Ishiwatari
- Series: BlazBlue
- Platforms: Arcade; PlayStation 3; PlayStation Vita
- Release: Arcade: JP: November 21, 2012; PlayStation 3: JP: October 24, 2013; NA: March 25, 2014; EU: April 23, 2014; PlayStation Vita: JP: April 24, 2014; NA: June 24, 2014
- Genres: Fighting, Visual novel
- Modes: Single-player, multiplayer
- Video game

BlazBlue: Chrono Phantasma Extend
- Developer: Arc System Works
- Publisher: JP: Arc System Works; NA: Aksys Games; EU: PQube
- Designed by: Toshimichi Mori; Yūki Katō
- Music by: Daisuke Ishiwatari
- Platform: Arcade; PlayStation 3; PlayStation 4; PlayStation Vita; Xbox One; Microsoft Windows
- Released: Arcade: JP: October 9, 2014; PS3, PS4, PS Vita, Xbox One: JP: April 23, 2015; NA: June 30, 2015; NA: July 28, 2015 (PS Vita); EU: October 23, 2015; Microsoft Windows: WW: March 2, 2016

BlazBlue: Chrono Phantasma (BBCP), released in Japan as BlazBlue: Chronophantasma (BBC), is a 2D fighting game developed by Arc System Works. It was originally to be released first as an arcade game in summer 2012, but was delayed to November 2012. A PlayStation 3 version of the game was released in Japan on October 24, 2013, while it was released in North America on March 25, 2014. Due to limited hardware and disc space, the game was not released on Xbox 360.

An updated version of the game titled BlazBlue: Chrono Phantasma Extend, dubbed as BlazBlue: Chrono Phantasma 2.0 in the arcade version, was originally released for arcades in October 2014, and for the PlayStation 3, PlayStation Vita, PlayStation 4, and Xbox One in April 2015. It was released on June 30, 2015, in North America, with the European region version released on October 23, 2015. It is the third game of the main series.

== Plot ==
Ragna and Rachel arrive in Ikaruga, the site of a war five years ago. Rachel believes the Lynchpin is hidden here, and it can stop Hazama and his partners Relius and the Imperator. Meanwhile, military leader Kagura Mutsuki invites Noel, Makoto, Jin, Kokonoe, and Tager (with Rachel joining on her own) to stage a coup against the Imperator and install Kagura as the leader of the NOL, really intending to give its to the rightful leader Homura.

Ragna is attacked and severely wounded by Nu13, before the event is undone by a Phenomenon Intervention. However, his Azure Grimoire keeps its damage, which leaves him unable to use it. Kagura captures him easily and tries to recruit him in exchange for the location of the Lynchpin. Kokonoe introduces Celica A. Mercury, a Chronophantasma copied from the past, who is required to use the Lynchpin. Ragna and Celica have a heart to heart and he confesses that he feels directionless in life. She suggests he fight to protect his loved ones. That night, Noel learns to become Mu12 at will.

Meanwhile, disgruntled Sector Seven employees release the monstrous Azrael and sends him to kill Ragna and Kokonoe. Kagura hosts a tournament to lure in Azrael and Tsubaki, using Ragna’s capture for publicity. Ragna and Azrael fight, but Ragna resolves not to rely on his powers and refuses to use them to Azrael’s disappointment. Azrael wins, but Kokonoe traps him in the Boundary. Jin, Makoto, and Noel free Tsubaki from her brainwashing and she joins their cause.

Rachel reveals that Ragna and Hazama’s Azure Grimoires are fake, and that Celica has been suppressing their power. Rachel sends Ragna back in time to the Great Dark War, where he meets the past Celica. They discover the Lynchpin will shut down all magic, and requires Celica to be used as a human battery to activate. Upon returning, Ragna confronts Kokonoe, as she knew Celica would have to die the whole time. Rachel reveals that the Lynchpin already has a soul bound to it: Tenjo, Ikaruga’s leader who died in the war.

Ragna and Celica meet with Bang Shishigami, Tenjo’s student, and prepare to activate the Lynchpin. The Imperator activates all the cauldrons, leaking poisonous seither all over the world. She reveals she is possessed by Hades-Izanami, the god of death, and secedes her position to Homura, Tenjo’s daughter. Relius attacks the heroes, revealing the Ikaruga civil war was orchestrated to get enough power to kill Amaterasu, so that Relius can be the god of this world instead. He is defeated and Hazama is killed, but Hades-Izanami succeeds in powering the superweapon Take-Mikazuchi and luring Amaterasu out of the Boundary. Bang activates the Lynchpin, allowing Ragna to kill Take-Mikazuchi, who is revealed to be kept alive by Nu13. They fight one last time.

Hades-Izanami attempts to kill Amaterasu herself, but Rachel casts a protection spell on it. Nu13 stabs Ragna, causing his Azure Grimoire to take over. Ragna hospitalizes Jin and Noel before disappearing. Tsubaki prepares to bring Ragna to justice, but Rachel tells her that Ragna will die soon and she must kill him before then.

== Gameplay ==
Besides normal rebalancing from Continuum Shift Extend, Chrono Phantasma features several revamped gameplay mechanics and introduces seven new characters to the roster (with two additional characters added to the Extend version of Chrono Phantasma). Several character sprites have also been redrawn, including a full new set of sprites depicting Noel Vermillion in a new costume. Several new songs were composed for the game and all previous musical character themes were re-arranged. The storyline is set after Continuum Shift.

A new mechanic called "Overdrive" has been added to the game, replacing the Gold Bursts from Continuum Shift. Green Bursts are still in but are the only form of Burst available. Distortion Drives such as Ragna's "Blood Kain", Taokaka's "Almost Becoming Two!", Litchi's "Great Wheel" and Bang's "Fu-Rin-Ka-Zan" have been retooled to be their respective characters' Overdrives. The length of an Overdrive increases the lower a character's health is, and performing an Overdrive stops the round timer while it is active.

Guard Primers were removed entirely and the Guard Crush has been moved to a new mechanic called "Crush Trigger" where, at the cost of 25 Heat, a player may hit the A and B attack buttons simultaneously to cause a Guard Crush against blocking opponents, provided the player is using Barrier Block.

== Characters ==
Nineteen characters from BlazBlue: Continuum Shift Extend return in Chrono Phantasma, except Lambda-11, who was replaced by Nu-13 in the original release of the game. In Extend, Lambda and Nu became separate characters. This brings the total roster to twenty eight characters. For Chrono Phantasma, they include:

- Amane Nishiki, an young man clad in a kimono and the leader of a troupe of street performers. He became interested about Carl Clover for an unknown reason.
- Bullet, a mercenary seeking revenge on Sector Seven for the death of her squad.
- Azrael, a blood-thirsty, fist-fighting soldier of Sector Seven. Previously locked down by Kokonoe and Tager, is recently released by the higher-ups at Sector Seven.
- Izayoi, the true form of Tsubaki Yayoi when she releases the power of the Sealed Weapon.

Introduced in console release

- Kagura Mutsuki, the head of one of the most powerful Duodecim families and one of the NOL's greatest generals.

Introduced as DLC characters in console release

- Yūki Terumi, one of the Six Heroes and the ghost who used Hazama as his vessel now forced to be a separate entity. He is the one who created the Azure Grimore. His true identity is Susano'o.
- Kokonoe Mercury, a genius scientist of Sector Seven and the daughter of two of the Six Heroes, Jubei and Nine.

Introduced in Extend update

- Celica A. Mercury, a girl with courteous disposition and an infectiously optimistic outlook on life. She is the sister of Nine, one of the Six Heroes.
- Lambda-11, a character in Continuum Shift, and originally as a normal mode palette swap for Nu-13's Unlimited Mode only in that second game. Later re-introduce a standalone separate character on her own, such as having newly move sets and playstyles on her own, in contrast of Nu-13's playstyles and move sets, starting from the game. Silent and devoid of emotions, Lambda speaks in a very mechanical and detached manner, and is incapable of taking any kind of action without a direct command.

== Development and release ==
The game was announced on August 5, 2012.

It sold 86,771 copies in its first two weeks on sale, making it the best debut in the series. The Vita version sold 10,709 copies in Japan.

=== BlazBlue: Chrono Phantasma Extend ===
BlazBlue: Chrono Phantasma Extend was announced on September 22, 2014, for release on arcades (as BlazBlue: Chrono Phantasma 2.0), and later announced on December 16, 2014, for consoles (as Chrono Phantasma Extend). Chrono Phantasma Extend adds two additional characters: Lambda-11 (who was introduced in Continuum Shift, originally being a normal mode palette swap for Nu-13's Unlimited Mode only) and Celica A. Mercury.

The console release introduced extra story modes, such as the Beach Scenario from the PlayStation Vita version of Chrono Phantasma, a new story based on the BlazBlue: Remix Heart manga, and additional scenarios for certain characters such as Kokonoe, Kagura, and Bullet. For the localized version of Extend, Library Mode is reintroduced from the Japanese release. The PlayStation Vita version of Chrono Phantasma Extend also adds dual audio to the Story Mode, which was not present in the original Vita release. BlazBlue Chrono Phantasma Extend was released for PC through Steam on March 2, 2016.

In Japan, BlazBlue: Chrono Phantasma Extend sold 20,420 copies on PlayStation 3 and 7,589 copies on PlayStation 4.

== Reception ==
Reception

Aggregate score
Aggregator	Score
Metacritic	PS3: 83/100; PS4: 80/100; PC: 85/100

Review scores
Publication	Score
Destructoid	7.5/10
Eurogamer	80%
Famitsu	PS3: 34/40; VITA: 33/40
IGN	8.5/10
Play	91%

BlazBlue Chrono Phantasma received positive reviews upon release, with critics citing the overhauled fighting mechanics as an improvement over Calamity Trigger and Continuum Shift, seven new unique fighters, smooth online play, in-depth training and tutorial modes, and an engaging story. Criticism was still directed toward the character designs, as well as confusion of playing story mode without past knowledge of the previous games.
