= Otometeki Koi Kakumei Love Revo!! =

2006 video game

- Developer: HuneX
- Publishers: Interchannel (PS2); GungHo Works (DS); Asgard (PC); Idea Factory (PSP)
- Designer: Yura (由良)
- Platforms: PlayStation 2 Nintendo DS; Microsoft Windows; PlayStation Portable
- Release: JP: January 26, 2006 (PS2); JP: February 14, 2008 (DS); JP: March 28, 2008 (PC); JP: May 20, 2010 (PSP)
- Genre: Dating sim
- Mode: Single player

Otometeki Koi Kakumei Love Revo!! (乙女的恋革命ラブレボ!!; Girlish Love Revolution Love Revo!!) is an otome game originally released in 2006 for the PlayStation 2. A manga adaptation has been made, and the manga is published in English by Yen Press as Ugly Duckling’s Love Revolution. There are also drama CDs based on the story. Some characters from this title are featured in the PSP game B's LOG Party, released on May 20, 2010.

== Gameplay ==
Love Revo takes place over a school year and works on a 3-day block basis where the player decides what actions to take for the next three days (one if it is a Sunday or a holiday). The player can choose to spend the whole day, or divide her day, using half the time for studying in school. The actions vary for each choice; if the player chooses to use the whole day, the actions follow as study, literature, science, and physical education. Whereas when the player choose to use half her day to study, after she may explore, eat candy to relieve her stress, diet, go to the club, and so on. On holidays and Sundays, all actions are available including going on a date with guys.

== Plot ==
The main character, Hitomi Sakuragawa (桜川 ヒトミ) (default name, changeable), was once a cute, beautiful girl, winning beauty contests in childhood. However, after losing to the temptation of junk food received from fans, she has steadily gained weight... until she reached 100 kg in her second year of high school. At the beginning of the school year, the main character and her brother moved into her father's mansion-like dorm. She discovered that the school's most popular guys are also moving in. Their impressions on her shocked her into starting a diet.

=== Gameplay ===
Dieting is a half-day option on normal days and accumulates the most stress. The player can lose weight through exercises, by using equipment, or consuming slimming products. Each activity is given a star value and the player can only use up to certain values on different days. As a result of dieting, Hitomi will gain stress. In order to reduce stress, the main character has to consume snacks and foods which, sometimes, depending on the food, may increase weight.

There are many shops and facilities that Hitomi can visit in the game. By using these shops to her advantage the main character can purchase snacks, dieting products, equipment and services like facials.

For each male character there are two endings: a love ending and a friend ending. In addition, there are two extra endings: one where Hitomi successfully diets but fails to win a boyfriend and one where she fails to diet altogether.

== Characters ==
- Ren Ichinose (一ノ瀬 蓮)

CV : Takahiro Sakurai

The most popular guy at school. A perfectionist with a cool attitude, he has blond hair at medium length and normally stands at the front of the No.5 best of the school. It is said that because of his handsome attire many people come attracted to him but not many people can approach him also because of his cool attitude. During the character's diet training he visits her from time to time, but says only a few words of encouragement.

- Masaki Kahara (華原 雅紀)

CV : Jun'ichi Miyake

Ranked second most popular. Easy to talk to and loves sports. He had a friend who had once betrayed him and he could not trust anyone again. His smiles and laughs prove to be fake. He loves his dog, whom you can normally find going on a walk with.

- Souta Fukami (深水 颯大)

CV : Hisayoshi Suganuma

Shouta is a year younger than the protagonist, he is one of the only guys that treat you nicely in the beginning of the game. He loves sweets and often invites the character to have some with him at night. He participates in the festival play with the player as the main character and he becomes rather fond of the character, even if she does not show affection to him, often saying things like "If you don't like something about me, tell me, 'cause I'll change it". You can meet him at the sports center on random days.

- Kennosuke Tachibana (橘 剣之助)

CV : Nobuyuki Hiyama

Fourth most popular guy. He is an heir to a Yakuza gang but he has a very different dream from being a Yakuza leader in mind. He is known as the cool, or mature guy of the school (a bit like Ichinose). He talks politely and the character can find him at the goods store after a while. He loves basketball although he claims to have no hobby. Although his attire may seem cold he's really very shy.

- Ayato Kamishiro (神城 綾人)

CV : Daisuke Namikawa

Fifth most popular. He is the nice, warm, caring, quiet type and loves reading. Quite sickly and collapses if too strained. Thought to have anemia.

- Touru Kinomura (木野村 透)

CV : Kenji Nojima

The main character's childhood friend. With his father being a manga artist and his mother a cosplayer, he himself also grew to love anime and manga. Starts off as chubby like the main character but due to her influence decides to start dieting as well. He's always a bit timid or shy, blushing often when the character or Onii-chan compliments him. He worries about the character on her diet and later he goes to the US coming back slim and as handsome as the others, after not being able to eat the food properly and coincidentally breaking his glasses and switching to lens.

- Kaede Tokita (時田 楓)

CV : Akira Ishida

A student that transfers in week 2. He is still getting used to new life around campus and is often seen with Yurika. He has long purple hair and wears glasses. He is known to do ikabanna.

- Ryuutarou Wakatsuki (若月 龍太郎)

CV : Tomokazu Sugita

The school's doctor. Wakatsuki-sensei is rather like a student than a doctor. He loves alcohol, cigars and beer. He likes to tease the character and sometimes views her as 'impossible' but he helps her anyway. He is also a bachelor although he can't walk the character home as often as the others. He is always seen with a sky blue pony tail and head phones.

- Takashi Sakuragawa (桜川 鷹士)

CV : Daisuke Hirakawa

The main character's brother. He is usually known as Onii-chan (big brother in Japanese). Onii-chan supports the main character through her diet and also makes monthly charts that show how 'in love' the various candidates are with her. He is quite hot-headed, gets jealous easily, very protective and has an obvious sister complex. He is quite popular within the fandom. He also gives you a monthly allowance of 5000 yen.

- Shinobu (シノブ)

CV : Hikaru Midorikawa

- Satoshi (サトシ)

CV : Satoshi Matsuda

A hidden character based on the actual Matsuda Satoshi that can be unlocked if certain requirements are met.

- Yurika Toujou (東条 百合香)

CV : Mami Kingetsu

Daughter of a high-class family. Yurika is beautiful to the point that flowers are usually seen around her. However her personality is the exact opposite. She loves picking on the main character, though acting kind or polite most of the time, she envies the main character for staying at the same house as the No.5 best. She is considered innocent and beautiful to the class room boys.

- Yuu Shibazaki (柴崎 優)

CV : Ayumi Murata

One of the main character's friends. She is the second friend of the character, with two pink pony tails, she looks rather sleepy or calm.

- Rie Ogino (荻野 梨恵)

CV : Ai Maeda, Kanako Kondo (Love Revo 2)

One of the main character's friends, she has short hair and looks rather cool. She cares deeply for the main character as a friend and stands by her side.

- Natsumi (ナツミ)

CV : Mariko Kōda

== Manga ==
A manga adaptation by Yūki Fujinari was published by Enterbrain beginning in 2006.

== Reception ==
Famitsu rated the PSP version 31 out of 40.

An English-language fan translation patch was made for the Nintendo DS version of Otometeki Koi Kakumei Love Revo!.
