= BlazBlue: Calamity Trigger =

2008 video game

- The official arcade flyer for BlazBlue: Calamity Trigger, featuring (clockwise from the left) Ragna, Noel, and Jin
- Developer: Arc System Works
- Publishers: JP: Arc System Works; NA: Aksys Games; EU: PQube and Zen United
- Director: Toshimichi Mori
- Producer: Toshimichi Mori
- Designer: Hiroaki Masuzawa
- Programmers: Takumi Iguchi; Ryuji Okamoto
- Artists: Toshimichi Mori; Yūki Katō
- Writers: Toshimichi Mori; Bingo Morihashi; Takeshi Yamanaka; Nanako Arima
- Composer: Daisuke Ishiwatari
- Series: BlazBlue
- Platforms: Arcade, PlayStation 3, PlayStation Portable, Xbox 360, Microsoft Windows
- Release: Arcade: JP: November 19, 2008; NA: November 20, 2008; PlayStation 3, Xbox 360, JP: June 25, 2009; NA: June 30, 2009; EU: April 2, 2010; PlayStation Portable: JP: February 25, 2010; NA: March 9, 2010; EU: September 9, 2010; Microsoft Windows: JP: August 26, 2010; EU: August 20, 2010; NA: September 02, 2010; Windows Store: WW: October 1, 2013; Steam: WW: February 13, 2014
- Genres: Fighting game, Visual novel
- Modes: Single-player, multiplayer
- Arcade system: Taito Type X2

BlazBlue: Calamity Trigger (ブレイブルー カラミティ・トリガー) is a 2D fighting game developed by Arc System Works. Its name is a combination of the words "blaze" and "blue" when the title is rendered in rōmaji, and of the words "brave" and "blue" when rendered in katakana. As Japanese people usually follow the katakana rendering, the Japanese pronunciation is made similar to the word "bray", entirely omitting the "z" sound. The game was released for the arcade in 2008, and for the PlayStation 3 and Xbox 360 in 2009, and Microsoft Windows in 2010. A port for the PlayStation Portable, titled BlazBlue: Calamity Trigger Portable, was also released in 2010. It is the first game of the main series.

== Gameplay ==
BlazBlue is a traditional 2D fighting game where two characters participate in a duel. A round is called a "rebel" and one match can consist of one to five "rebels". To win a round, one player must either defeat the other by inflicting damage through various attacks to reduce their opponent's health to zero or by having more remaining health than their opponent within the time limit.

Every character has a weak, medium, and strong attack, as well as a "unique" technique, called a Drive attack, which is different for each character. Those attacks are also known as "A", "B", "C", and "D". Various combos can be performed by every character through careful input of regular and Drive attacks. A combo consists of two or more consecutive attacks that hit an opponent without them retaliating. As combos become longer, each attack will do less damage than normal to give the opponent a chance to retaliate. Grabs can be incorporated into combos also by pressing the "B" and "C" buttons at the same time. Occasionally, some attacks (e.g. Jin's Hirensou) will use portions of the player's heat gauge at the bottom of the screen. The heat gauge is filled by either dealing or receiving damage. When a character has 50% or more heat, special moves called "Distortion Drives" can be performed. When a Distortion Drive is successfully performed and connects with the opponent, it deals massive damage and is visually flashier than normal attacks.

Along with attacks every character has two types of block. One is the regular block that can be broken with a "Guard Crush". That can be achieved by pushing the "Guard Libra" gauge all the way to the opponent's side through repeated attacks. If the opponent keeps blocking, then their guard can be broken, leaving them open for attack. The second type of block is a Barrier Block, which is initiated by blocking while holding the "A" and "B" buttons at the same time. A Barrier Block cannot be broken like a normal guard, but there is a limit on how long one can be held, which is indicated by the Barrier Gauge. If the Barrier Gauge empties, the player will receive 150% damage until it regenerates to half-full.

=== Advanced tactics ===
A form of an advanced tactic is the "Rapid Cancel". These can be done after any attack to instantly cancel the character sprite's animation frames and reset back to the resting position. However, this can only be done at the cost of 50% of the heat gauge. Counters are one of the easier tactics to perform. All that is required is for a player to strike their opponent while they are in the middle of an attacking animation to stop them in their tracks. This leaves an opponent open for a combo. In addition to a player's regular block options, they can also "Instant Block", blocking as soon as an opponent's attack lands, but reduces the amount of time the character is stuck in their blocking animation and gives you a little heat. If a player is under pressure from the opponent, a "Barrier Burst" can be done at any time to send the opponent away to create some space at the cost of having no Barrier Block and receiving 150% damage for the rest of the round. A Barrier Burst may also be used offensively to break the opponents guard, though the player's character will still suffer the extra damage and cannot perform Barrier Block for the remainder of the round. A Barrier Burst can be performed twice at most throughout the entire match.

== Plot ==
Before the events of the game, humanity was on the verge of extinction from a creature called the "Black Beast." The world was saved by six heroes who wielded magic. They helped humanity create "Ars Magus", a fusion of magic and science, to defeat the Black Beast. This event would be later known as the First War of Magic.

After the war, the Novus Orbis Librarium (also referred to as "The Library" or the "NOL") was created to govern the world with the use of Ars Magus. A great deal of dissent was caused by the Library, partly due to Ars Magus' use in nearly every facet of society, and the widening socioeconomic gap between those who could and couldn't use Ars Magus. This dissent would eventually form years later into the Second War of Magic, also known as the Ikaruga Civil War, when the city of Ikaruga openly rebelled against the NOL. Upon winning the war, the NOL imposed a harsher rule on the world, punishing any rebellion against the NOL with death.

In December 2199 A.D., several years after the Second War of Magic, a branch of the NOL was utterly destroyed by an SS-class rebel named Ragna, also known as the "Grim Reaper", in an attempt to destroy the Librarium. The NOL, hoping to stop him, immediately announced the largest bounty ever, available to anyone who could capture him. Ragna possesses a powerful form of Ars Magus known as the Azure Grimoire. This led the NOL, as well as the other fighters, to hunt Ragna not just for his bounty, but the Azure Grimoire.

== Characters ==
- Ragna the Bloodedge, a Grim Reaper. He destroys several branches of the Library for unknown reasons. Consequently, he now has the highest bounty in NOL history on his head and all characters of the story are tied to him in some way.
- Jin Kisaragi, a soldier of the NOL during the Ikaruga war and commanding officer to Noel. He suddenly and unexpectedly abandoned his post, running to Kagutsuchi in search of Ragna.
- Noel Vermillion, a lieutenant in the NOL and a subordinate to Major Kisaragi. She has been sent to Kagutsuchi to retrieve him and use force if necessary. Throughout her adventure to seek him out she ends up in the most unexpected situations.
- Rachel Alucard, a mysterious vampire. She is the current head of the Alucard vampire family and is supposedly in Kagutsuchi only to relieve her boredom.
- Taokaka, a would-be "vigilante" if she knew what that word meant. She has been sent by her village to capture "Rawrgna" to get much money.
- Iron Tager, commonly referred to as the "Red Devil". He works for a group known only as Sector Seven. He is in Kagutsuchi to retrieve Hakumen.
- Litchi Faye-Ling, the beautiful doctor of Orient Town and once-scientist is in search of a creature known only as Arakune. Her reasons and connections to the creature are unclear.
- Arakune, a creature teeming with insects that lives within the lowest levels of Kagutsuchi. He is moving above ground, attracted to the presence of the Azure.
- Bang Shishigami, a proud ninja of Ikaruga. He became a vigilante protecting a small group of survivors and hoping to gain enough money and fame to rebuild Ikaruga and avenge it by defeating Jin. Finding out that Ragna has been spotted in town, he won't quit until he has brought the criminal to justice.
- Carl Clover, a talented vigilante. He and his doll Nirvana (whom he refers to as his sister, Ada) have come to Kagutsuchi in pursuit of Ragna, his Azure Grimoire, and the bounty on his head.
- Hakumen, also known as the "White Knight". He is one of the six heroes. Where he has been and why he has chosen to reappear now is a mystery.
- Nu-13, a "Murakumo Unit" sealed within the Sheol Gate who has a strong attachment to Ragna and would also appear to have a split personality. She is somehow related to Noel, which is later revealed in the story.

== Release ==
The game was first released for the Taito Type X2 arcade system board, with a 1.66:1 aspect ratio (also known as the 5:3 ratio) ratio and 768p resolution, on November 19, in Japan and November 20, 2008, in the United States. It was released on the PlayStation 3 and Xbox 360 home consoles on June 25, 2009, in Japan. A port for the PlayStation Portable, titled BlazBlue Portable, was released in Japan on February 25, 2010, and in Europe on September 9, 2010. The PC version was released in Europe on August 20 and in Japan on August 26, 2010. A direct conversion of the Xbox 360 version contains cross-platform compatibility via the Games for Windows - Live service. In February 2014, the game was ported to Steam with its Games for Windows - Live features removed and thus the online multiplayer along with it.

The limited edition U.S. version a Blu-ray disc for PS3 or DVD for Xbox 360 comes with a strategy guide and combo videos for every character. Also included is a two-disc Limited Edition soundtrack with special remixes from Oh No. In the European version the two-CD soundtrack is not included, and the tutorial Videos of the PS3 versions are now in DVD format. In the European Limited Edition an artbook is included, containing many drawings and concept art. The same and more pictures can be found in the game's gallery mode.

Console-exclusive features

The PlayStation 3 and Xbox 360 versions includes all content from the arcade version, along with content exclusive to the console versions, including:

- New music, animations, backgrounds and a console-exclusive story mode.
- Theme songs done by Kotoko (Ao-Iconoclast) for the OP (excluded in the PSP version in the western release, due to licensing issues), Hironobu Kageyama (Omae no Tettsui ni Kugi wo Ute) for Bang's Fūrinkazan Theme, and a song by Noel's Japanese VA, Kanako Kondou, titled 'Love So Blue', which plays at various points during story mode.
- The ability to switch between Japanese and English voices.
- Online multiplayer supporting up to six players, where 2 players play at a time and the remainder are able to watch the battle as spectators.
- Special "Unlimited" versions of characters, which grant boss-like properties similar to the Gold and Black forms in Guilty Gear. Unlimited versions of ν-13, Ragna, Rachel, and Hakumen can be fought and unlocked in the game's single player modes, while the rest are downloadable content. In the game's European release, all of the game's characters have an Unlimited version.
- Unlockable Astral Heats for all characters. Astral Heats require a full Heat gauge and the opponent to have 20% or less of their health, and can only be performed during the final round of a match (i.e. the third round of a best of three match). Successfully using an Astral Heat will result in what is known as an Astral Finish, in which the opponent is instantly defeated.
- The PlayStation 3 version includes remote play that allows users to play the game on a PSP after connecting it to their console.

Downloadable content for the PlayStation 3 and Xbox 360 versions of BlazBlue: Calamity Trigger included four additional color palettes for each character, four color packs, and a color pack bundle. Unlimited versions of Ragna, Rachel, Hakumen and ν-13 may also be purchased in favor of unlocking them through the game. The Unlimited forms for the other characters are also available for purchase through the Xbox Live Marketplace and PlayStation Network.

On January 14, 2010, Arc System Works announced a downloadable patch for both the Xbox 360 and PS3 versions of the game. This patch is stated to correct several bugs, such as the odd volume glitches regarding Rachel's lightning attacks and "Omae no Tettsui ni Kugi wo Ute!" (the former being occasionally too loud, and the latter suddenly becoming very quiet when Bang is hit during the Fu-Rin-Ka-Zan). It will also update the netcode for smoother online play, and will allow players to join games which are already in progress. It will also allow system updates to be made to the game. To coincide with this patch, a second set of downloadable color packs will be released, as well as the brand-new Unlimited characters from the PSP version.

== Reception ==
Reception

Aggregate score
Aggregator	Score
Metacritic	PS3: 87/100; X360: 86/100; PSP: 82/100

Review scores
Publication	Score
1Up.com	A
Destructoid	8/10
Eurogamer	9/10
Famitsu	30/40 (8/7/8/7)
Game Informer	7.75/10
GameSpot	8/10
GameSpy	4.5/5
GameTrailers	9/10
Giant Bomb	3/5
IGN	9.4/10

The console versions have received positive reviews, with scores of 87/100 and 86/100 for PlayStation 3 and Xbox 360 respectively on Metacritic. Praise has been given for the depth of gameplay in spite of a comparatively small roster as well as an excellent online component. The game's plot has also been well-received, many reviews noting it as well-conceived and exceptional amidst the often lackluster and convoluted stories that the fighting game genre has.

Both console versions of the game debuted in the top ten of Japanese sales charts during their week of release. The PlayStation 3 version entered at number five with 33,768 units sold and the Xbox 360 entered at number 6 with 24,812 units sold. Media Create included both versions in their top 500 software sales for 2009 at 57,796 and 36,065 units respectively. As of 2012, BlazBlue: Calamity Trigger and Continuum Shift sold 1.7 million units worldwide, including over 800,000 in the United States.

In 2009, BlazBlue was nominated for a Spike Fighting Game of the Year award but lost to Street Fighter IV.
