= BlayzBloo: Super Melee Brawlers Battle Royale =

2010 video game

- Developer: Arc System Works
- Publishers: JP: Arc System Works; NA: Aksys Games
- Series: BlazBlue
- Platform: Nintendo DSi
- Release: JP: January 27, 2010; NA: August 2, 2010
- Genre: Fighting game
- Modes: Single-player, Multiplayer

BlayzBloo: Super Melee Brawlers Battle Royale, released in Japan as BlazBlue: Battle × Battle (ぶれいぶるー -バトル×バトル-, BureiBurū: Batoru kurosu Batoru), is a 3D arena fighting video game developed by Arc System Works. It was published in Japan by Arc System Works on January 27, 2010 for the Nintendo DSi. The game was released in North America on August 2, 2010.

== Gameplay ==
BlayzBloo features battles between up to four players in 3D arenas. The game is played with the control pad and four buttons used to perform basic attacks, special Drive attacks, jumping, and using items acquired from chests in the arena. Unlike the other games in the series, characters cannot block, which means that attacks have to be avoided. Five playable characters are available, each presented in chibi form and with different attack properties: Ragna has a soul eating power, Rachel has a wind attack, Taokaka can perform dash moves, Jin can freeze opponents, and Noel can use chain combos.

Single Player mode has three different rule sets: Life (last man standing mode), Points (one with the most points win), and Flag (capturing the Panda Flag). There is a separate Free Battle Mode, in which things can be customized without limits in terms of stages and rules. BlayzBloo also supports local multiplayer in Free Battle Mode for up to four players who each own a copy.
