= BlazBlue: Continuum Shift =

2009 video game

- Promo Poster of BlazBlue: Continuum Shift featuring (clockwise) Noel, Hazama, Ragna, Jin, and Tsubaki
- Developer: Arc System Works
- Publishers: JP: Arc System Works; NA: Aksys Games; EU: Arc System Works UK
- Designers: Toshimichi Mori; Yūki Katō
- Composer: Daisuke Ishiwatari
- Series: BlazBlue
- Platforms: Arcade; PlayStation 3 Xbox 360; Windows
- Release: Arcade: JP: November 20, 2009; PlayStation 3, Xbox 360: JP: July 1, 2010; NA: July 27, 2010; EU: December 3, 2010; Windows: WW: December 11, 2014
- Genres: Fighting game, Visual novel
- Modes: Single-player, multiplayer

BlazBlue: Continuum Shift is a 2D fighting game developed and published by Arc System Works. It came to arcades, before it was released for the PlayStation 3 and Xbox 360. It was later released for the Taito Type X2 arcade system board, with a 1.66:1 aspect ratio (also known as the 5:3 ratio) and 1280 x 768 pixels (768p) resolution. Revisions entitled BlazBlue: Continuum Shift II and BlazBlue: Continuum Shift Extend were released in arcades between 2010 and 2011. They were later ported to the PlayStation 3, PlayStation Portable, PlayStation Vita, Nintendo 3DS, and Windows. It is the second game of the main series.

== Gameplay ==
Continuum Shift retains the traditional 2D fighter gameplay of two characters participating in a duel on a two dimensional plane. A match can consist of one to five rounds known as "rebels". To win a round, one player must either deplete the other one's life gauge to 0 by inflicting enough damage through various attacks or by having more remaining health after the round's timer depletes.

During each rebel, players fill a Heat Gauge which can be used for advanced techniques such as Distortion Drives, Rapid Cancels, Counter Assaults, and certain characters' attacks (Jin/Hakumen). The Heat Gauge can be filled via dealing damage, taking damage, and perfectly blocking attacks. However, some mechanics from the previous installment have been changed or completely replaced in the transition.

The Guard Libra system which utilizes a tug-of-war gauge has been replaced with the new Guard Primer point system. Each character has a certain number of points (e.g. Tager has a maximum of 10 primer points while characters like Carl or Ragna have 4 and 5 respectively). These points are depleted whenever moves with "Guard Break" properties (e.g. Jin's "Gale" or Hakumen's "Forward C") are blocked. Upon depletion of all points, the character is immobilized for a certain period of time known as Guard Crush. Barrier blocking can be used at critical times to prevent a Guard Crush by consuming 50% of the Barrier gauge instead. Primer points regenerate over time or after all points are depleted.

The game has undergone several changes to gameplay mechanics from its predecessor. Continuum Shift features at least eight new characters: Tsubaki Yayoi and Hazama (from the Arcade version), Mu-12 (Console-exclusive), Makoto Nanaya, Valkenhayn R. Hellsing, Platinum the Trinity and Relius Clover (the later four released via DLC); Lambda-11 replaces the character Nu-13; and rebalances previous characters with new or tweaked moves. The game also features all-new character select art, new and returning gameplay modes, and continues the story.

Barrier Burst was replaced by Break Burst, a similar ability but with different penalties. Break Burst can only be performed twice in a single match, and its second use only becomes available if the player lose a round. It no longer permanently drains the character's Barrier Gauge or gives the player the "Danger" penalty. A free unused burst is required for Astral Heats. Bursts have different properties depending on when they are used, as the offensive "Gold Burst" has high bounce and combo-ability, while the defensive "Green Burst" will provide invincibility for the entire burst motion, at the cost of permanently halving the character's maximum primer points. All lost primer points due to Green Bursts will not recover until the next round.

The conditions to use an Astral Heat, a flashy finishing move, have also been changed. Instead of requiring it to be the final round, having 100% Heat, and an opponent having 20% health or less, it now only requires it to be the player's match point round and an opponent being within 35% health, in addition to the aforementioned requirement of one free burst.

== Plot ==
The game is set after Calamity Trigger. A few days have passed since the reported raid by Ragna the Bloodedge, the 13th Hierarchical City "Kagutsuchi" forgets to celebrate New Years, as his alleged involvement in the "Mysterious Bombing" and "Huge Pentacle Sightings" becomes the talk of the town. With the NOL offering no official explanation, the citizens voice their own theories, exaggerating and spreading rumors like wildfire. Completely indifferent to the state of the city, Ragna bides his time—waiting for the chance to achieve his true objective, and the enormous "power" that has ensnared him.

Following the end of the time loop, Rachel meets with the machine Takamagahara, who reveals they have released the murderous ghost Terumi as a pawn to acquire Azure. Terumi possesses the living robot vessel Hazama. Hazama massacres a large amount of NOL employees to create the Kusinagi, a sword that can kill a god. He orders Tsubaki to kill Noel and Jin, but she fails and loses her sight and succumbs to Hazama’s mind control spell. Jin sets out to find a way to save her. Ragna attempts to kill Hazama, but Hazama reveals he has an Azure Grimoire as well, countering Ragna’s powers. The entire time, Takamagahara initiates a series of phenomenon interventions, which replaces the current timeline with another possibility. This is known as the Continuum Shift.

Meanwhile, scientist Kokonoe finishes fixing Lambda11, by inserting the soul of Nu13. This renders Lambda11 non-functional, so Kokonoe erases her memory, leaving her as an emotionless servant. Equipped with the Grimoire-countering Idea Engine, Kokonoe sends Lambda11 to attack Hazama, but she is beaten badly. Hazama taunts her by reminding Lambda11 of Nu13’s memories of Ragna before she retreats.

Hazama kidnaps Noel and reveals that she is actually Mu12, an unfinished robot designed to enter the Boundary. He breaks her mind and finishes her, granting her the Kusinagi to kill the god Amaterasu. As Mu12 leaves for a Cauldron, a portal to Amaterasu, Hazama prepares to kill Ragna. However, Lambda11 sacrifices herself and transfers her Idea Engine to Ragna, allowing Ragna to subdue Hazama. Jin stalls Mu12 until Ragna catches up and sacrifices his arm to restore her memories as Noel.

Hazama kills Takamagahara, ending the Continuum Shift. He prepares to kill the heroes, but stops when the Imperator appears, revealed to be Ragna and Jin’s long-dead sister Saya. Kokonoe builds Ragna a prosthetic arm. The entire cast leaves for Ikaruga for their own reasons. In a post credits scene, Hazama discovers Nu13 regenerating in the Boundary.

== Characters ==
The first wave of characters from Calamity Trigger return in Continuum Shift. This brings the total roster to twenty playable characters. For Continuum Shift, they include:

- Tsubaki Yayoi: Jin and Noel's childhood friend from the Military Academy, and a member of the NOL's Zero Division. She describes as a straight A student, with a rather sensitive personality. She is very serious and reserved, and is a member of the dignified Yayoi family.
- Hazama: The shady captain of NOL's Intelligence Division and Noel's supervisor who appeared as a NPC in Calamity Trigger, later revealed to be an artificial human created to house the spirit of Yuki Terumi, one of the Six Heroes, before becoming his own person in Central Fiction.
- Lambda-11 (Λ-11- / Λ -No. 11-): An imitation Murakumo Unit created by Kokonoe by combining the body of the 11th experimental replica of Saya with the soul of Nu-13, recovered after falling into the Gates of Sheol. Kokonoe completely erased her memory and as a result, Lambda-11 is only interested in carrying out Kokonoe's orders. Despite Kokonoe's efforts, Lambda still possesses feelings for Ragna.

Introduced in console release

- Mu-12 (μ-12- / μ -No. 12-): Noel, upon having her true powers awoken. She is a perfect Murakumo Unit who possesses Kusanagi and has a goal Terumi wished for: Destruction of the Sankishin Unit: Amaterasu and the world. However, in Central Fiction, Mu took on Noel's characteristics and became a separate character. It's because that Noel was Amaterasu all along using Mu as a host body like how Terumi used Hazama as a vessel.

Introduced as DLC characters in console release

- Makoto Nanaya: Another Military Academy classmate and one of Noel's best friends and a talking squirrel, She is quite hyperactive with a short attention span. The DLC character was released on PSN and Xbox Live Marketplace on August 3, 2010.
- Platinum the Trinity: A young girl with two personalities named Luna (a rude, unkind girl) and Sena (a polite, young boy) which flawless switch at a moment's notice. Like Hazama, Platinum is an artificial being created to house the soul of Trinity Glassfield of the Six Heroes. The character was released on 10 May for the Xbox 360, and 12 May for the PlayStation 3.
- Valkenhayn R. Hellsing: Initially a NPC in Calamity Trigger, he is one of the Six Heroes who served the Alucard family for generations, elderly in appearance yet protective of Rachel. The character was released on September 29 in the US and on September 21 in Japan for the PlayStation 3. Valkenhayn was released for the Xbox 360 on December 7 after a substantial delay.

Introduced in Extend update

- Relius Clover: Hazama's partner, Carl's father, and a Colonel in the NOL's R&D department. He is also the creator of the Murakumo Units and for Ada being Nirvana. He created her a copy, using his wife, Ignis.

== Release ==
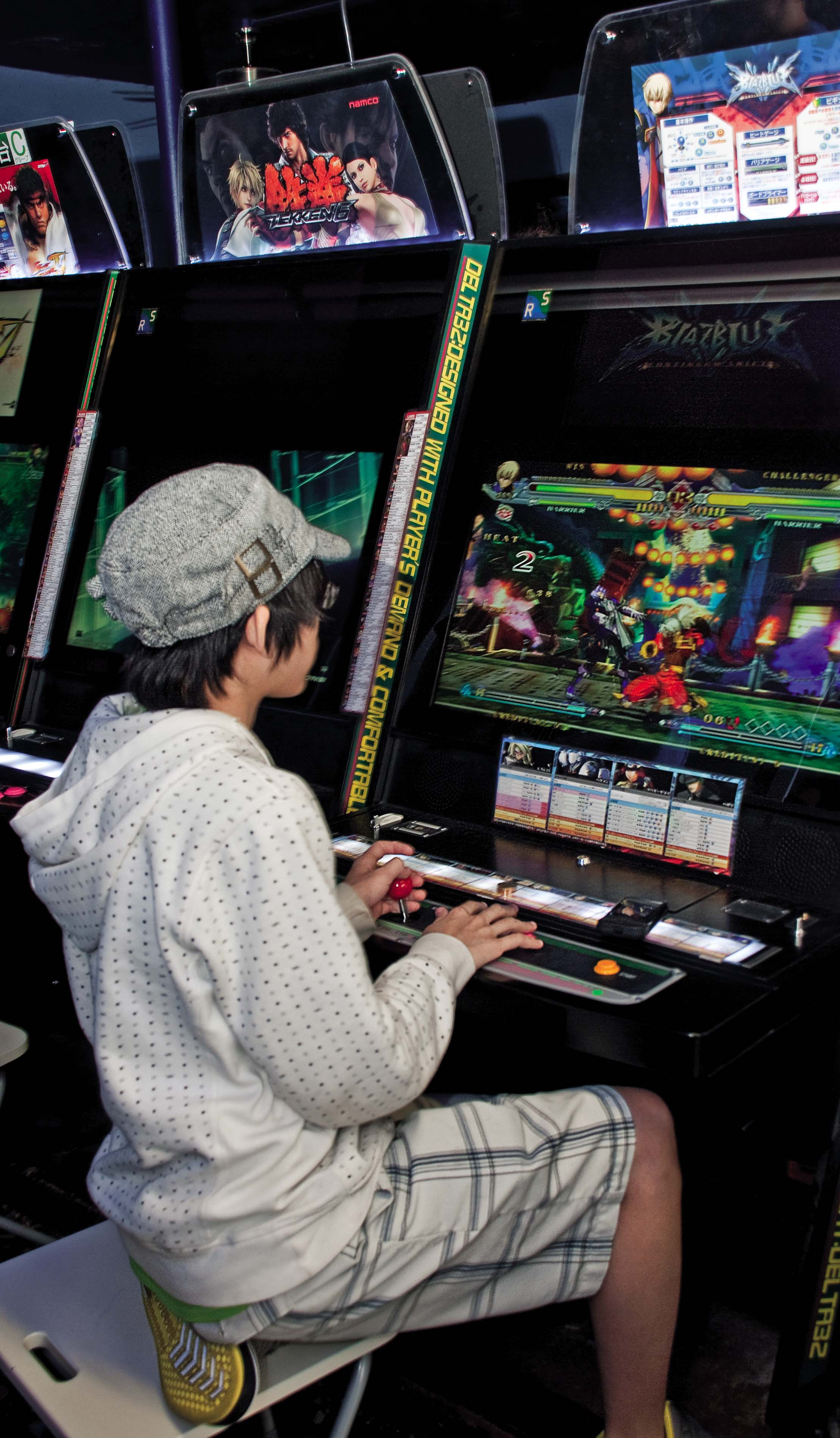
A man playing a Continuum Shift arcade cabinet in Austin, Texas, 2010.

BlazBlue: Continuum Shift was originally released for the Japanese arcades on November 20, 2009. A console version was released in Japan in 2010 along with a region-exclusive Limited Edition. Two of its updated versions were later released, which are available for PlayStation Portable, Nintendo 3DS, and PlayStation Vita.

The console port is arcade perfect and includes new stages, the Legion Mode from the PSP version of Calamity Trigger, and revamped versions of the original stages. There is also new Tutorial and Challenge modes similar to Street Fighter IV that help teach players the basics of the game's system. Additionally, the game will be patchable for character balance, with the first patch expected to be released within six months of the initial release date. This version includes a brand-new console-exclusive character: Mu-12, the true form of Noel Vermillion, as a new secret boss character and unlockable fighter: newcomer Makoto, released on August 3, 2010.

The Japanese version of the game was released on July 1, 2010. The standard edition was released in the United States on July 27, 2010, and included English and Japanese voice acting. A limited edition was released in Japan which includes a petit Nendoroid of Noel, a mini-script replica of the story, a visual book and a super picture label. European publishers Zen United have confirmed in an interview with Neo Empire that Europe will be getting a Limited Edition version of Continuum Shift. The limited edition includes a 96-page art book and eight art cards depicting various fighters and combos.

For a limited time, a Fan Edition was released on the Zen United store limited to five hundred copies which included the limited edition of Continuum Shift, along with the Makoto DLC Code, the Noel Nendoroid, an art print by UDON and Marvel Comics artist Alvin Lee and a Taokaka mouse-pad. However, in the United States, American publisher Aksys decided to not release a Limited Edition of the game due to time constraints and production lead times. The game's theme song is "Hekira no Sora e Izanaedo" (碧羅の天へ誘えど; lit. "Invitation to the Blue Sky")), performed by Kotoko.

=== BlazBlue: Continuum Shift II ===
BlazBlue: Continuum Shift II
- Developer: Arc System Works
- Publishers: JP: Arc System Works; NA: Aksys Games; EU: Arc System Works UK
- Designers: Toshimichi Mori; Yūki Katō
- Composer: Daisuke Ishiwatari
- Series: BlazBlue
- Platforms: Arcade; PlayStation 3 Xbox 360; PlayStation Portable; Nintendo 3DS
- Release: Arcade: JP: December 9, 2010; NA: May 18, 2011; EU: May 19, 2011; PlayStation 3 (Downloadable Update): JP: May 12, 2011; NA: May 17, 2011; EU: May 25, 2011; Xbox 360 (Downloadable Update): JP: May 10, 2011; NA: May 10, 2011; PlayStation Portable, Nintendo 3DS: JP: March 31, 2011; NA: May 31, 2011; EU: November 4, 2011
- Genre: Fighting game
- Modes: Single-player multiplayer

The first arcade revision of Continuum Shift, entitled BlazBlue: Continuum Shift II, was released in arcades on December 9, 2010. It features all the console exclusive characters, numerous balance changes, and other cosmetic changes such as a new announcer.

Toshimichi Mori confirmed that Continuum Shift II was released as a free downloadable update for both PlayStation 3 and Xbox 360 versions of BlazBlue: Continuum Shift on May 10, 2011, for both the Japanese and English Xbox 360 versions and on May 12, 2011, for the Japanese PlayStation 3 version. The PS3 US version was released on May 17, 2011, and the European version was released on May 25, 2011.

The PlayStation Portable and Nintendo 3DS ports of the game, released in Japan on March 31, 2011, include all the characters released as downloadable content (Makoto Nanaya, Valkenhayn R. Hellsing, and Platinum the Trinity) with possible new story elements for them, a new mode called "Abyss", and balance tweaks as well.

A software update for the Japanese arcade version of Continuum Shift II was released on July 15, 2011. It included changes in the display of player information at the VS screen and also allowed for Calamity Trigger stages to be used in tournament play. Another update was released during the winter of 2011 and includes several new balance changes and one new character, Relius Clover.

=== BlazBlue: Continuum Shift Extend ===
BlazBlue: Continuum Shift Extend
- Developer: Arc System Works
- Publishers: JP: Arc System Works; NA: Aksys Games
- Composer: Daisuke Ishiwatari
- Series: BlazBlue
- Platforms: Arcade, PlayStation 3, Xbox 360, PlayStation Vita, PlayStation Portable, Microsoft Windows
- Release: Arcade: JP: September 2011; PlayStation 3, Xbox 360, PlayStation Vita: JP: December 17, 2011; NA: February 14, 2012; EU: February 24, 2012; PlayStation Portable: JP: May 31, 2012; Microsoft Windows: WW: December 11, 2014
- Genre: Fighting game
- Modes: Single-player multiplayer
- Arcade system: Taito Type X^{2}

BlazBlue: Continuum Shift Extend (originally titled BlazBlue: Continuum Shift II Plus) was announced for the PlayStation Vita at E3 2011, and was later confirmed to be slated for the PlayStation 3 and Xbox 360 as well. The game features an updated version of Calamity Trigger's Story Mode called Blazblue Calamity Trigger Reconstruction; the inclusion of Relius Clover as a playable character; four new stories for Platinum, Makoto, Valkenhayn, and Relius; a new Unlimited Mars game mode; hidden Distortion Drives for every playable character's Unlimited form; and further balance tweaks. In addition, the game also includes a new opening animation produced by Production I.G. as well as new theme song called "Sōkyū no Hikari" (蒼穹の光, Celestial Light) by Faylan. Aksys has also released Continuum Shift Extend internationally.

A version for the game for the PlayStation Portable was released on May 31, 2012, in Japan. This version features an exclusive BBQ (BlazBlue Quiz) Mode not found in the other versions. However, while the other versions have full online play, the PSP version is limited to ad-hoc, with support for two to four players. On November 14, 2014, it was confirmed by Korean studio H2 Interactive that the game would be receiving a port to Valve's digital store, Steam, to be released on December 11, 2014, with online play intact, unlike the Steam port of Calamity Trigger which had the netplay removed possibly due to the game's usage of Games for Windows – Live.

In Japan, BlazBlue: Continuum Shift Extend sold 3,982 copies on PSP.

== Reception ==
Reception

Aggregate score
Aggregator	Score
Metacritic	PS3: 87/100; X360: 85/100; 3DS: 64/100; PSP: 77/100; PS3 (Extend): 73/100; VITA: 83/100; X360 (Extend): 79/100

Gaming Bus awarded the game a B+, citing as pros great tutorials, Abyss Mode, storyline, gameplay, difficulty adjustment, Stylish Mode makes game accessible to new players, online gameplay, a balanced versus mode, and the soundtrack. However, it did note that Unlimited Mars is unaccessible to new players, the game requires much faster reaction times than Marvel or Street Fighter, the learning curve can be a bit steep when learning to play against humans, and that the game will not appeal to those turned off by anime character designs.

At the 14th Annual Interactive Achievement Awards, the Academy of Interactive Arts & Sciences nominated BlazBlue: Continuum Shift for "Fighting Game of the Year".

As of 2012, BlazBlue: Calamity Trigger and Continuum Shift sold 1.7 million units worldwide, including over 800,000 in the United States.
