= Hisayoshi Suganuma =

Japanese voice actor (born 1978)

- 菅沼 久義
- Born: September 30, 1978 (age 48); Tokyo, Japan
- Occupation: Voice actor
- Employer: Aoni Production
- Website: cube.gotohp.com

Hisayoshi Suganuma (菅沼 久義, Suganuma Hisayoshi; born September 30, 1978 in Tokyo) is a Japanese voice actor and member of Aoni Production.

== Early life ==
Suganuma wanted to be a voice actor when he watched Mobile Suit Victory Gundam. He was also part of the voice actor unit G.I.Zoku with Kisho Taniyama and Hideki Tasaka.

== Filmography ==
=== Television animation ===
- .hack//Roots as Hideyo
- Natsume's Book of Friends as Atsushi Kitamoto
- Persona 5: The Animation as Sugimura
- World Trigger (2014) as Shirō Kikuchihara

=== Film ===
- Mobile Suit Gundam – The Movie Trilogy as Boy A (Special Edition)
- Clockwork Island Adventure as Donny

=== Video games ===
- Black Panther: New Like a Dragon Chapter as Tenma Sakaki
- Dynasty Warriors series as Jiang Wei, Sun Quan
- Gurumin as Puku, Prince
- Inuyasha as Tsuyu's husband
- Jump Force as Avatar
- Kamen Rider: Memory of Heroez as Kazari, Yousuke Togawa
- Kessen II as Ma Dai, Emperor
- The Legend of Heroes: Trails in the Sky as Gilbert Stein
- The Legend of Heroes: Trails into Reverie as Gilbert Stein
- Mamorukun Curse! as Luchino
- Otometeki Koi Kakumei Love Revo!! as Souta Fukami
- Puyo Puyo series as Suketoudara, Baldanders, Otomo & Gogotte
- Puyopuyo!! Quest as Incubus
- Rune Factory Frontier as Marco
- Sakura Wars: So Long, My Love as Shinjiro Taiga
- Super Robot Wars 30 as Shinjiro Taiga
- Tales of the World: Narikiri Dungeon 2 as Frio Sven
- Tales of Zestiria as Breunor
- Tokyo Xanadu as Tomoaki Mikuriya
- Yggdra Union as Cruz and Canaan
- Rockman ZX Advent as Tethys
