= BlazBlue =

Fighting game series

- Genres: Fighting; Visual novel; Card battle; Rhythm; Roguelike
- Developers: Arc System Works; 91Act; Linked Brain
- Publishers: Arc System Works; Aksys Games; Zen United; PQube; H2 Interactive; 91Act
- Creator: Toshimichi Mori
- Platform: Various
- First release: BlazBlue: Calamity Trigger; November 19, 2008
- Latest release: BlazBlue Entropy Effect; January 31, 2024
- Spin-offs: Xblaze series

BlazBlue (ブレイブルー, Bureiburū) is a video game series created by Arc System Works. The company's former chief development officer and video game franchise creator, Toshimichi Mori, was hired by Daisuke Ishiwatari to join Arc System Works on October 1, 2003. After eighteen years, Mori left the company on September 25, 2022. On February 28, 2023, he founded Studio Flare, a subsidiary owned by NetEase.

In July 2012, BlazBlue: Calamity Trigger and Continuum Shift had sold 1.7 million copies worldwide, including over 800,000 units in the United States.

== Games ==
=== Main series ===
Game	Details
BlazBlue: Calamity Trigger Original release dates: JP: November 19, 2008; NA: June 30, 2009; EU: April 2, 2010	Release years by system: 2008 – Arcade; 2009 – PlayStation 3, Xbox 360; 2010 – PlayStation Portable, Microsoft Windows
BlazBlue: Calamity Trigger Original release dates: JP: November 19, 2008; NA: June 30, 2009; EU: April 2, 2010	Notes: An arcade port was released for the Microsoft Store on December 21, 2012; The original PC release was removed from Games for Windows – Live, and released on Steam by H2 Interactive without online multiplayer in 2014
BlazBlue: Continuum Shift Original release dates: JP: November 20, 2009; NA: July 27, 2010; EU: December 3, 2010	Release years by system: 2009 – Arcade; 2010 – PlayStation 3, Xbox 360
BlazBlue: Chrono Phantasma Original release dates: JP: November 21, 2012; NA: March 25, 2014; EU: April 23, 2014	Release years by system: 2012 – Arcade; 2013 – PlayStation 3; 2014 – PlayStation Vita
BlazBlue: Chrono Phantasma Original release dates: JP: November 21, 2012; NA: March 25, 2014; EU: April 23, 2014	Notes: The PlayStation 3 and PlayStation Vita port were updated to version 1.1 in North America on May 14, 2014
BlazBlue: Central Fiction Original release dates: JP: November 19, 2015; NA: November 1, 2016; EU: November 4, 2016	Release years by system: 2015 – Arcade; 2016 – PlayStation 3, PlayStation 4; 2017 – Microsoft Windows; TBA – PlayStation 5
BlazBlue: Central Fiction Original release dates: JP: November 19, 2015; NA: November 1, 2016; EU: November 4, 2016	Notes: Released in western markets without an English dub

=== Updated versions ===
Game	Details
BlazBlue: Continuum Shift II Original release dates: JP: December 9, 2010; NA: May 10, 2011; EU: May 10, 2011	Release years by system: 2010 – Arcade; 2011 – PlayStation 3, Xbox 360; 2011 – PlayStation Portable, Nintendo 3DS
BlazBlue: Continuum Shift II Original release dates: JP: December 9, 2010; NA: May 10, 2011; EU: May 10, 2011	Notes: The PlayStation 3 and Xbox 360 versions of Continuum Shift were updated for free to Continuum Shift II as a downloadable patch; The portable versions feature offline gameplay
BlazBlue: Continuum Shift Extend Original release dates: JP: December 17, 2011; NA: February 14, 2012; EU: February 24, 2012	Release years by system: 2011 – Arcade; 2011 – PlayStation 3, Xbox 360, PlayStation Vita; 2012 – PlayStation Portable; 2014 – Microsoft Windows
BlazBlue: Continuum Shift Extend Original release dates: JP: December 17, 2011; NA: February 14, 2012; EU: February 24, 2012	Notes: The PlayStation Portable port features offline play and was released only in Japan; The Steam version was unavailable in Europe, and the regional lockout ended on May 19, 2015
BlazBlue: Chrono Phantasma Extend Original release dates: JP: April 23, 2015; NA: June 30, 2015; EU: October 29, 2015	Release years by system: 2014 – Arcade; 2015 – PlayStation 3, PlayStation 4, PlayStation Vita, Xbox One; 2016 – Microsoft Windows
BlazBlue: Chrono Phantasma Extend Original release dates: JP: April 23, 2015; NA: June 30, 2015; EU: October 29, 2015	Notes: Titled BlazBlue: Chrono Phantasma 2.0 instead on arcade release; The PlayStation 3 and PlayStation 4 versions have cross-platform online multiplayer; Unlike the original Chrono Phantasma release in North America, Extend features a localized Library Mode
BlazBlue: Central Fiction Special Edition Original release dates: JP: February 7, 2019; NA: February 7, 2019; EU: February 8, 2019	Release years by system: 2019 – Nintendo Switch
BlazBlue: Central Fiction Special Edition Original release dates: JP: February 7, 2019; NA: February 7, 2019; EU: February 8, 2019	Notes: The Nintendo Switch version of the port has all currently-released DLC; Digital-only release in North America

=== Spin-offs ===
Game	Details
BlayzBloo: Super Melee Brawlers Battle Royale Original release dates: JP: January 27, 2010; NA: August 2, 2010	Release years by system: 2010 – DSiWare
BlayzBloo: Super Melee Brawlers Battle Royale Original release dates: JP: January 27, 2010; NA: August 2, 2010	Notes: 3D arena fighting game
BlazBlue: Clone Phantasma Original release dates: JP: December 26, 2012; NA: August 21, 2014	Release years by system: 2012 – Nintendo 3DS
BlazBlue: Clone Phantasma Original release dates: JP: December 26, 2012; NA: August 21, 2014	Notes: 3D arena fighting game
Xblaze Code: Embryo Original release dates: JP: July 23, 2013; NA: June 24, 2014; EU: September 18, 2015	Release years by system: 2013 – PlayStation 3, PlayStation Vita; 2016 – Microsoft Windows
Xblaze Code: Embryo Original release dates: JP: July 23, 2013; NA: June 24, 2014; EU: September 18, 2015	Notes: Visual novel set 150 years before Calamity Trigger
Eat Beat, Dead Spike-san Original release date: WW: February 25, 2015	Release years by system: 2015 – iOS, Android; 2018 – Nintendo Switch
Eat Beat, Dead Spike-san Original release date: WW: February 25, 2015	Notes: Rhythm game featuring Dead Spike, Ragna the Bloodedge's signature special move; Whilst the mobile version is free-to-play, the Nintendo Switch version is buy-to-play, but includes all DLC content.
Xblaze Lost: Memories Original release dates: JP: April 9, 2015; NA: August 11, 2015; EU: June 21, 2016	Release years by system: 2015 – PlayStation 3, PlayStation Vita; 2016 – Microsoft Windows
Xblaze Lost: Memories Original release dates: JP: April 9, 2015; NA: August 11, 2015; EU: June 21, 2016	Notes: The sequel to Xblaze Code: Embryo
BlazBlue: Battle Cards Original release date: AU: April 30, 2015; CAN: May 6, 2015; NA: May 14, 2015	Release years by system: 2015 – iOS
BlazBlue: Battle Cards Original release date: AU: April 30, 2015; CAN: May 6, 2015; NA: May 14, 2015	Notes: Card battle game featuring characters from the series
BlazBlue Revolution Reburning Original release date: HK/TW: July 7, 2015; SG/MY: April 2, 2016; WW: June 8, 2016; JP: October 20, 2016	Release years by system: 2016 – iOS, Android
BlazBlue Revolution Reburning Original release date: HK/TW: July 7, 2015; SG/MY: April 2, 2016; WW: June 8, 2016; JP: October 20, 2016	Notes: Developed and published by 91Act; Ceased services in Japan on November 23, 2018
BlazBlue: Cross Tag Battle Original release date: JP: May 31, 2018; WW: June 5, 2018	Release years by system: 2018 – PlayStation 4, Nintendo Switch, Microsoft Windows; 2019 – Arcade; 2023 – Xbox One, Xbox Series X/S
BlazBlue: Cross Tag Battle Original release date: JP: May 31, 2018; WW: June 5, 2018	Notes: Crossover tag-team fighting game featuring characters from BlazBlue, Persona 4 Arena, Under Night In-Birth, RWBY, Arcana Heart, Senran Kagura, and Akatsuki Blitzkampf
BlazBlue Alternative: Dark War Original release date: JP: February 16, 2021 – January 31, 2022 (11 months, 2 weeks and 1 day)	Release years by system: 2021 – iOS, Android
BlazBlue Alternative: Dark War Original release date: JP: February 16, 2021 – January 31, 2022 (11 months, 2 weeks and 1 day)	Notes: Announced in 2017, the game resurfaced in early 2021; Developed by Linked Brain; Mobile game set in an alternate timeline; Discontinued on January 31, 2022
BlazBlue Entropy Effect Original release date: January 31, 2024	Release years by system: 2024 – iOS, Android, Microsoft Windows; 2026 – PlayStation 5, Xbox Series X/S, Nintendo Switch, Nintendo Switch 2
BlazBlue Entropy Effect Original release date: January 31, 2024	Notes: Acton-adventure roguelike developed and published by 91Act; Entered Steam Early Access on August 15, 2023 and had a full release on January 31, 2024; iOS and Android versions were initially only available in China, until a 2025 worldwide release; Ported to consoles as BlazBlue Entropy Effect X, with additional features including a new story scenario by series writers Mako Komao and Akihito Kumagawa
Untitled Mobile BlazBlue Spin-off N/A – iOS, Android	Notes: Developed by MACOVILL

== Other media ==
=== Novels ===
Game	Details
BlazBlue: Phase 0 2010 – Light novel	Notes: Single volume written by Mako Komao, illustrated by Yūki Katō, and published by Fujimi Shobo; The story follows Bloodedge, the Six Heroes, and Celica A. Mercury, set before Calamity Trigger
BlazBlue: Phase Shift 2011 – Light novel	Notes: Four volumes written by Mako Komao, illustrated by Yūki Katō, and published by Fujimi Shobo; The novels follow the conflict between humanity, the magic guild of Ishana, and The Black Beast
BlazBlue: Calamity Trigger 2013 – Light novel	Notes: Two volumes written by Mako Komao, illustrated by Yuki Sugiyama, and published by Fujimi Dragon Book; Novelization of the events for Calamity Trigger
BlazBlue: Continuum Shift 2013 – Light novel	Notes: Two volumes written by Mako Komao, illustrated by Yuki Sugiyama, and published by Fujimi Dragon Book; Novelization of the events for Continuum Shift
BlazBlue: Bloodedge Experience 2014 – Light novel	Notes: Two volumes written by Mako Komao, illustrated by Kyo Kuroichigo, and published by Fujimi Shobo; The novels follow Naoto Kurogane and Raquel Alucard
BlazBlue: Spiral Shift 2016 – Light novel	Notes: Single volume written by Mako Komao; Jin Kisaragi survives the Ikaruga Civil War

=== Manga ===
Game	Details
BlazBlue: Official Comics 2009 – Manga	Notes: Two-volume manga published to promote the releases of Calamity Trigger and Continuum Shift; Two collections of short scenarios written and illustrated by doujinshi artists
BlazBlue: Chimelical Complex 2011 – Manga	Notes: Two-volume manga by Toshimichi Mori, illustrated by Haruyoshi Kobayakawa, and published by Famitsu Comic Clear; The story follows Ragna the Bloodedge in the adaptation of Calamity Trigger
BlazBlue: Remix Heart 2012 – Manga	Notes: Four-volume manga written by Deko Akao, illustrated by Sumeragi, and serialized on Age Premium until 2014; Set before Calamity Trigger, Mai Natsume, a man transformed into a woman by the No-Name Grimoire, attends the Military Academy with her friends
BlazBlue 2013 – Manga	Notes: Two-volume manga written by Toshimichi Mori, illustrated by Sakaki Yoshioka, and published on Monthly Dragon Age; A second manga adaptation of Calamity Trigger
BlazBlue: Variable Heart 2016 – Manga	Notes: Three-volume manga written by Toshimichi Mori, illustrated by Sumeragi, and serialized on Monthly Dragon Age until 2017; A sequel to Remix Heart, Mai fights with the squad leader of the NOL

=== Anime ===
Game	Details
BlazBlue: Alter Memory 2013 – Anime series	Notes: One cour series by teamKG and Hoods Entertainment; Recap story of Calamity Trigger and Continuum Shift; Licensed by Funimation in North America

=== Other ===
Game	Details
BlazBlue Radio 2009 – Online radio show	Notes: An official radio show aired on Nico Nico Douga, featuring the antics of the game's voice actors through chibi versions of their characters in the same style as the Teach Me, Miss Litchi! game segments.; The show's nickname BuruRaji (ぶるらじ) is a contraction of "BlueRadio" in Japanese.; An official yonkoma gag manga series, BuruMan (ぶるまん, contraction of "BlueManga"), has been published infrequently on the official website.; Two comedic radio dramas were produced, titled BuruDora (ぶるどら, contraction of "BlueDrama"). A light novel based on the game and written by Mako Komao, titled BlazBlue: Phase 0, was published by Fujimi Shobo. It is set before Calamity Trigger.; Starting with season 8, BlazBlue Radio NEO, the show aired on YouTube with English subtitles.

== Characters ==
The main BlazBlue series iterated its roster with each new game release, growing the playable cast from ten characters from the arcade release of Calamity Trigger to thirty seven characters as of Central Fiction. Several characters have made appearances on game crossovers and other associated media.

Character	Calamity Trigger	Continuum Shift	Chrono Phantasma	Central Fiction	Cross Tag Battle
Ragna the Bloodedge	✓	✓	✓	✓	✓
Jin Kisaragi	✓	✓	✓	✓	✓
Noel Vermillion	✓	✓	✓	✓	✓
Rachel Alucard	✓	✓	✓	✓	✓
Taokaka	✓	✓	✓	✓	✗
Iron Tager	✓	✓	✓	✓	✓
Litchi Faye-Ling	✓	✓	✓	✓	✗
Arakune	✓	✓	✓	✓	✗
Bang Shishigami	✓	✓	✓	✓	✗
Carl Clover	✓	✓	✓	✓	✗
Hakumen	✓	✓	✓	✓	✓ (Note: DLC character.)
ν-No.13-	✓	✗	✓	✓	✓
Tsubaki Yayoi	✗	✓	✓	✓	✗
Hazama	✗	✓	✓	✓	✓
λ-No.11-	✗	✓	✓ (Note: Character exclusive to Extend re-release.)	✓	✗
μ-No.12-	✗	✓ (Note: Unlockable character.)	✓	✓	✗
Makoto Nanaya	✗	✓ (Note: Included in Extend / Special Edition re-release.)	✓	✓	✓
Platinum the Trinity	✗	✓	✓	✓	✓
Valkenhayn R. Hellsing	✗	✓	✓	✓	✗
Relius Clover	✗	✓	✓	✓	✗
Amane Nishiki	✗	✗	✓	✓	✗
Bullet	✗	✗	✓	✓	✗
Azrael	✗	✗	✓	✓	✓
Izayoi	✗	✗	✓	✓	✓
Kagura Mutsuki	✗	✗	✓	✓	✗
Kokonoe	✗	✗	✓	✓	✗
Yūki Terumi	✗	✗	✓	✓	✗
Celica A. Mercury	✗	✗	✓	✓	✓
Hibiki Kohaku	✗	✗	✗	✓	✗
Naoto Kurogane	✗	✗	✗	✓	✓
Nine the Phantom	✗	✗	✗	✓	✓
Izanami	✗	✗	✗	✓	✗
Es	✗	✗	✗	✓	✓
Mai Natsume	✗	✗	✗	✓	✓
Susano'o	✗	✗	✗	✓	✓
Jubei	✗	✗	✗	✓	✓
Trinity Glassfille	✗	✗	✗	✓ (Note: DLC available on PlayStation 4 and PC versions only.)	✗
Total	12	20	28	37	19/53 (Note: This total includes characters from all series represented in Cross Tag Battle.)

== Events and merchandise ==
Two official events, BuruFesu 2009: Riot Summer (ぶるふぇす 2009 -Riot Summer-) and BuruFesu: Spring Raid (ぶるふぇす -Spring Raid-) (contraction of "BlueFestival"), were held in June 2009 and February 2010. It features a variety of posters, artbooks, apparel, and figurines. On February 11, 2017, Arc System Works announced a collaboration with Koei Tecmo and Team Ninja to release the costume set, consisting of the costumes of some characters from BlazBlue and Guilty Gear for another game Dead or Alive 5 Last Round.
