= List of BlazBlue characters =

The cast of the mainline BlazBlue series as shown on the game's 10th Anniversary website

This is a list of characters for the fighting video game series BlazBlue.

== Playable in BlazBlue: Calamity Trigger ==
=== Ragna the Bloodedge ===
Voiced by (English): Patrick Seitz
Voiced by (Japanese): Tomokazu Sugita

Ragna the Bloodedge (ラグナ＝ザ＝ブラッドエッジ, Raguna za Buraddoejji) is the main protagonist of the series from Calamity Trigger to Central Fiction. Also known as the Grim Reaper, he is feared by the NOL for being the most powerful individual to have ever rebelled against them since the Ikaruga Civil War. His actions, which included destroying countless numbers of their branches, have labeled him the most wanted criminal and caused him to receive the largest bounty ever in the history of the NOL. He possesses a powerful form of "Ars Magus" called the Azure Grimoire, also known as the titular BlazBlue, which is often either the secondary or primary target of those after him and the bounty. His goal is to destroy the NOL, for he blames them for destroying his family. He is Jin Kisaragi's biological brother, whose rivalry with him stems from an incident that happened, when their sister Saya was presumably killed. His right arm is prosthetic because his real one was removed by Terumi, who had taken control of Jin's mind. He was resurrected by Rachel as a dhampir, causing one of his green eyes to turn red and his once-blond hair to white. The BlazBlue he possesses is only a fragment of an imitation. The true Grimoire is actually destined to be wielded by Noel Vermillion. In Continuum Shift, Ragna receives the Idea Engine from the dying Lambda which enabled him to access the true Azure. He realizes that Saya is possessed by Izanami, and decides to give up vengeance and protect his loved ones in Chrono Phantasma, In Central Fiction, he protects the girl inside Amaterasu from other people whose dreams are strong enough to remake the world. He and Jin (including his future-past counterpart Hakumen) soon learned that Noel/Mu can be used to recreate Saya, whose soul remains in her old body, possessed by Izanami. Once Noel and Mu merge, he helps Noel merge with Izanami and imprison her into her soul, recreating Saya. With the help of Jin and Trinity after Ragna separates the Susano'o armor from Terumi, Jin transports Ragna and Terumi to the Azure void where Ragna can kill him for good. Once all evils are finished, and after helping Noel merge with the Origin to free her from the Amaterasu Unit, Ragna casts himself into the cauldron and remain outside the world, to prevent anyone from retrieving the Azure. As this act would erase himself from the memories of everybody in the story, he says goodbye to his beloved siblings and tells Amane that he has no regrets at all. Ragna disappears and abandons his sword, which is later placed to the hill near Celica's church as a makeshift grave. It is unknown when will Ragna return to the real world, as the final scene shows that the sword has been taken by somebody. He is also hinted not to be a natural-born human due to his unusual features, an idea that is confirmed in the final game when it is revealed he is the child of the fifth Prime Field Device. Ragna's weapon is called Blood-Scythe (ブラッドサイズ Buraddo Saizu), a giant sword extending into a scythe. His Drive, Soul Eater, enables him to attack an opponent and steal a portion of damage dealt to replenish health. Ragna appears as "Sir Bloodedege" in the game Damon and Baby.

=== Jin Kisaragi ===
Voiced by (English): David Vincent
Voiced by (Japanese): Tetsuya Kakihara

Jin Kisaragi (ジン＝キサラギ) is a former Major in the NOL, one of the elite commanding officers and Ragna's rival. He is cool and calm, but he is sometimes jealous, ambitious and possessive with little care for others, treating them like they are mere obstacles. He displayed formidable actions to gain his rank during the Ikaruga Civil War. When he heard that Ragna the Bloodedge had arrived on the scene, he quickly abandoned his post to hunt him down by himself. However, the truth reveals that Ragna is Jin's biological brother, and Jin's early feelings of rivalry were furthered by his visions of the future and his Nox Nyctores' amplification of his emotions. Terumi corrupted Jin and incited him to remove Ragna's arm (the latter nearly dying without the intervention of Rachel) and supposedly kills Saya, and Jin often says that he is looking forward to killing Ragna again. After the incident, he was adopted into the Kisaragi house, a highly powerful and respected family within the NOL. He has a notable psychosis, said to be caused by his sword, the Nox Nyctores Mucro Algesco: Yukianesa (氷剣・ユキアネサ, Hyōken: Yukianesa). While the sword grants him manipulation over ice, it enhances primal feelings and is often blamed for insanity. It is also revealed that Hakumen is another incarnation of Jin from a different time cycle called "Calamity Trigger". Jin's Drive, Frost Bite, allows him to freeze his opponents. In Chrono Phantasma, he begins to resist the effects of his weapon. In Central Fiction, he no longer acts insane towards Ragna. At the end of the series, Ragna separates the Susano'o armor from Terumi, and Jin manages to don the armor with the help of Trinity and destroy Terumi's physical form, before transporting the two to an Azure void where Ragna defeats Terumi. Ragna takes the Master Unit away from the world, despite the warning of his siblings. After bidding Ragna farewell, Jin loses all memories of his brother. At the end of the series, Jin has been promoted to a higher rank, but he can no longer fight due to his deal with Trinity having used up all of his energy.

=== Noel Vermillion/Mu-12 ===
Voiced by (English): Cristina Vee
Voiced by (Japanese): Kanako Kondō

Noel Vermillion (ノエル＝ヴァーミリオン, Noeru Vāmirion) is the main heroine of the series, who was found as a young girl amidst the burning fields of Ikaruga where she was rescued, and then adopted by the noble Vermillion family. After her family was accused of treason, she attended the Military Academy in an attempt to save them. It was because of her outstanding combat activity that she became a lieutenant of the NOL using the Nox Nyctores revolver Arcus Diabolus: Bolverk (魔銃・ベルヴェルク, Majū: Beruveruku), which does not only fire bullets but rather inflicts damage by creating distortions in dimensional space. At the start of the series, she was Jin's secretary. In truth, Noel suffers amnesia, and is actually Mu-12 (ミュー·トゥエルブ, Myū-Tuerubu; μ-12-, μ -No.12-), a Murakumo Unit created by Relius Clover, the predecessor of Nu-13 and first playable in the console version of Continuum Shift, where her form serves as the final boss. After being saved by Ragna, Noel seeks out Rachel in Chrono Phantasma, who helps her learn to control her powers as Mu. In Central Fiction however, Noel separates from Mu to protect the gate to the Azure, and it is revealed that she is the Master Unit's link to the world, due to being based on the Origin itself. After Noel merges with Mu once again, she helps Ragna seal Izanami within her soul, in order to recreate Saya, though she prefers to still use "Noel", so as to prevent Izanami from possessing her. When Yūki Terumi kidnaps Hakumen and Noel to steal the Susano'o and Master Unit, this backfires and Ragna kills Terumi. At the end of the series, Noel merges with "The Origin", and Ragna takes the Master Unit away from the real world to prevent the time from looping, despite Jin's warning. Noel resigns from the NOL, and accompanies Lambda and the catatonic Nu-13 at Celica's restored church. With her Drive, Chain Revolver, Noel does different attacks in an active stance.

Jonathan Oyama at VentureBeat gave Noel positive reception, where he described her as being "extremely effective as a fighter," and stated "Oddly enough, she's one of the few game characters who I can truly sympathize with. Just like Noel, I often have a tough time remembering my own past."

Mu-12

Noel's true form, Mu-12 was introduced as the final boss of Continuum Shift. Initially, Terumi sealed Noel's memories after breaking her with intense psychological conditioning to hate the world, and she serves him for one purpose: to destroy the Sankishin Unit "Amaterasu" and erase the world from its existence. Due to this, she is called Kusanagi, the "Sword of the Godslayer" and the perfect form of a Murakumo Unit, and her hatred for the world has increased substantially, making her aggressive towards everything she fights. Like Nu, Mu wields the Nox Nyctores Lux Sanctus: Murakumo, though her version is different in color and appearance. Her Drive, Steins Gunner, projects a Stein to a targeted location. In the end of Continuum Shift, Ragna is able to undo Terumi's conditioning and restore Noel, who initially is afraid of her true self afterwards. However, in Chrono Phantasma, Noel acknowledges Mu as herself and is able to use her true abilities while retaining her personality. In Central Fiction Mu is separated from Noel after they learn the truth of the world in an effort to protect the gate to the Azure. This leaves Mu without a form and existing as only a soul, while an amnesiac Noel retains their body. Eventually, the two rejoin and are able to explain the truth of the world to Ragna and Jin, as well as the nature of Izanami. Noel uses this form to imprison Izanami within her soul, with the help from Ragna.

=== Rachel Alucard ===
Voiced by (English): Mela Lee
Voiced by (Japanese): Kana Ueda

Rachel Alucard (レイチェル＝アルカード, Reicheru Arukādo) is a vampire and the current head of the noble Alucard family. Despite her small appearance, she is a formidable opponent in battle, using her servants, Nago and Gii, as weapons, and her Drive, Silpheed, to control the wind. Rachel also possesses one of the three Sankishin, the Tsukuyomi Unit (ツクヨミユニット, Tsukuyomi Yunitto), which is a giant shield that she describes as the "ultimate defense". Rachel slipped out of her castle in search of fun because she hates to be bored, though in truth she is an 'Observer' tasked with watching over the actions of the main characters. Due to her hairstyle, several characters nickname her "Rabbit", a name that irritates her to no end, though Ragna seems to be the only one who can get away with her. Despite her status, however, she deeply loathes her vampiric impulses. She seems to be watching Ragna, as she is the one who accidentally turned him into a half-vampire by giving him her powers (this is also the reason behind his heterochromia and healing ability). Due to this, he is one of the only characters who is aware of her. Though Rachel often insults Ragna and treats him poorly, it is simply a ruse to hide the feelings she has developed for him. She also watches and toys with the other characters of the game as part of her amusement. In Chrono Phantasma, she asks Tsubaki to kill her if she, Jin or Noel fails to kill Ragna. In Central Fiction, it is shown that Rachel is losing her powers due to constant interference and she is shown to have reacted to Naoto due to his similarities to Ragna, making her lose her composure. In the ending, Rachel loses her memories of Ragna due to his sacrifice, but recalls having fond memories of someone whose name she does not know. It is implied that she will try to find Ragna once more, aided by White Justice, the future being of Tsubaki from an alternate timeline.

=== Taokaka ===
Voiced by (English): Philece Sampler (BBCT - Alter Memory)
Voiced by (Japanese): Chiwa Saitō

Taokaka (タオカカ), or Tao for short, is a catgirl wand a member of the Kaka tribe, wearing a large coat obscuring her true face, only exposing beady red eyes and a row of teeth (whether or not this is her true face is a mystery), paws for hands and feet, and a clearly visible tail. The rest of her body, from the chest to the ankles, is that of a human being, with tanned skin and large breasts. She wants to get back the sky above her village, which was sealed off by humans building cities above her village, was recently sent by the Elder to retrieve the bounty on Ragna's head, becoming a vigilante in the process. Despite this resolve, she is considerably food-obsessed and forgetful, often falling asleep on a whim, becoming hungry moments after a meal, or forgetting details moments after hearing them. She is good friends with Litchi, affectionately referring to her as "boobie lady". However, she does not seem to refer to anyone other than herself by name; she calls Ragna "good guy" (because he buys her food), Bang "scruffy man", Arakune "black squiggly", Noel "lacking lady", Hakumen "mask man", Nu "flappy-flap", and Jubei "cat person". She cannot recognize that Ragna the "good-guy" and "Rawrgna" the criminal are the same person. It is revealed the Kaka tribe, which she hails from, is actually genetically engineered from the genes of Jubei, one of the Six Heroes. With her Drive, Dancing Edge, Taokaka launches at her opponents in a torpedo-like fashion.

=== Iron Tager ===
Voiced by (English): Jamieson Price
Voiced by (Japanese): Kenji Nomura

Originally the leader of an Ikaruga unit, Tager (テイガー, Teigā) suffered a mortal wound during the Ikaruga Civil War and was forced to withdraw. He was revived as Iron Tager (アイアン＝テイガー, Aian Teigā; TR-0009), an enormous cyborg, by Kokonoe whom he pledged loyalty afterwards. After his revival, he bears a similar resemblance to a demon, which resulted in him dubbed as the "Red Devil of Sector Seven". He was originally Bullet's captain before his near death at the hands of Azrael. At the end of the series, Tager and Bullet remain partners. Tager uses his Drive, Voltic Battler, to magnetize his opponents for a short period of time.

=== Litchi Faye-Ling ===
Voiced by (English): Lauren Landa
Voiced by (Japanese): Chiaki Takahashi

Litchi Faye-Ling (ライチ＝フェイ＝リン, Raichi Fei Rin) is a renowned doctor living in Orient Town, located in Kagutsuchi. She owns a clinic there and is helped by her assistant Linhua. She had worked with Tager and Kokonoe in Sector Seven until the incident where Lotte "Roy" Carmine, one of her colleagues whom she had feelings for, became Arakune. She defends the local townspeople from Arakune and seeks to restore him to his former self through any means necessary, even through death. She also seems to respect Bang Shishigami, even apologizing to him if she defeats him in a match, although she remains unaware of the true extent of his feelings for her. In Continuum Shift, Litchi is compelled to join the NOL by Hazama in order to obtain information that can help her save Arakune. In Central Fiction, Litchi enters the Boundary, and finds Roy alive and well, and that Arakune is simply a shade of himself used to anchor his existence until he had acclimated to the Boundary. Finding closure with Roy, Litchi returns to the real world and is given Roy's blessing to destroy Arakune. However, Bang knocks Litchi out to do the deed for her, so she would not have to kill even a shadow of the man she loved. Her Drive, Mantenbō (萬天棒 lit. Myriad Heavens Staff), enables her to control her bō staff of the same name while changing her moveset.

Litchi is described as "The hottest doctor in video games" in the list of the 50 hottest video game characters by Complex, where she ranked at 38th.

=== Arakune ===
Voiced by (English): Spike Spencer
Voiced by (Japanese): Takashi Hikida

Arakune (アラクネ), formerly known as Lotte "Roy" Carmine (ロット＝カーマイン, Rotto Kāmain), is a black blob-like creature with a white mask who formerly worked alongside Tager, Kokonoe, and Litchi in Sector Seven. After an attempt to study the Boundary, he fell in and became what he is today, now housing innumerable insects with his now-blobby body and thriving on knowledge. His horrible condition has rendered him virtually insane and lacking any reliable memory, as well as distorting his speech to near incoherency (most of his dialogue consists of gibberish, insane laughter and tortured screaming). Throughout the series his sanity returns at times but is quick to disappear just as fast. In Central Fiction, it is revealed that Roy was inside the Boundary the whole time and Arakune was just his vessel that allowed himself to exist within the Boundary. Due to acclimating to the Boundary, Roy no longer needs Arakune to anchor himself. Choosing to stay within the Boundary to study it, Roy gives Litchi his blessing to destroy Arakune after making peace with her. Although Bang carries out Roy's last request for Litchi, she does not suffer from killing even a mere shadow of a man she loved. With his Drive, Crimson, Arakune's special attacks fill his Curse Gauge.

Chris Hoadley of VentureBeat listed Arakune as "15 most significant new fighting game characters," where he commented that he "fits the genre's "freak" archetype with erratic movements and the ability to pester foes with insects after inflicting a curse," and credited him paving the way for similar characters in Marvel vs. Capcom 3 and Injustice: Gods Among Us.

=== Bang Shishigami ===
Voiced by (English): Tony Oliver (Calamity Trigger); Steve Kramer (Alter Memory)
Voiced by (Japanese): Tsuyoshi Koyama

Bang Shishigami (シシガミバング, Shishigami Bangu) is a ninja from Ikaruga village. He lost his home in the Ikaruga Civil War and his master Tenjō at the hands of Jin Kisaragi, and he and his followers began living in Kagutsuchi waiting for the right moment to strike back at Jin and the NOL. There, he declares himself a hero of love and justice, and dedicates himself to exterminating evil and overturning injustice wherever he goes. He is quite over-exuberant, prone to speeches and tangents as well as making dramatic entrances. He has a romantic fascination with Litchi, always willing to go charging in headlong if he sees someone making her upset. He is overzealous in every way, subtlety not usually at the forefront of his mind (this is only reinforced where his Astral Heat in Continuum Shift destroys almost all of his clothes), however his fiery spirit and will have earned him the respect of a few characters, especially Hakumen. He also wants Ragna's bounty to rebuild the glory of Ikaruga. In Chrono Phantasma, it is revealed that Bang's giant nail is the Nox Nyctores, Phoenix: Rettenjō (鳳翼・烈天上 Hōyoku: Rettenjō), which greatly shocks him, and he decides to seek more answers about his weapon. Bang later learns that his weapon was in fact also a key to halt the flow of seithr across the world while also learning of Izanami's schemes. Donning a more serious attitude, Bang teams up with Ragna in order to help him save the world. At the end of the series, Bang leads a restoration of Ikaruga, under the order of his master's successor Homura. His Drive, Burning Heart, is a set of attacks that light up an icon in his Fu-Rin-Ka-Zan Gauge on hit.

=== Carl Clover ===
Voiced by (English): Michelle Ruff
Voiced by (Japanese): Miyuki Sawashiro

Carl Clover (カルル＝クローバー, Karuru Kurōbā) is a young boy who, like Noel and Jin, was a student at the Military Academy, but dropped out without warning while Noel and Jin graduated. He is currently after Ragna's bounty and the Azure Grimoire, leading him to become a vigilante. He travels with a maid-like puppet called Nirvana, whom he believes to be his sister Ada. He is unwilling to see that she is, in fact, the Nox Nyctores Deus Machina: Nirvana (機神・ニルヴァーナ, Kishin: Niruvāna), a causality weapon in the form of a marionette which amplifies its owner's desires to kill. After several people attempted to disassemble or remove Nirvana from him, Carl became extremely paranoid and possessive over her. He is the son of Relius, whom he hates and refuses to call his father. Despite this, over the course of the series Carl begins to slowly become more like Relius-a development many characters note. In Central Fiction, Carl peeks into the boundary and loses his right eye, blinding it but giving him an understanding of the nature of souls. At the end of the series, Carl takes the same path as his father, wearing an eyepatch with the same design as his father's signature mask. His Drive, Automaton, enables him to control Nirvana in battle.

=== Hakumen ===
Voiced by (English): David Vincent
Voiced by (Japanese): Tetsuya Kakihara

Leader of the Six Heroes, Hakumen (ハクメン; Alternatively spelled Haku-men) is a mighty warrior wielding a long sword, the Nox Nyctores, Interfectum Malus: Ōkami (斬魔・鳴神, Zanma: Ōkami). His body is one of the Sankishin, the Susano'o Unit (スサノヲユニット, Susano'o Yunitto). Though the armor acts as his body, Hakumen removes his mask at one point in the first game to reveal to an illusion of Ragna his face, though the player does not see it. Hakumen led mankind to defeat the Black Beast, and was said afterward to have been cast into a void between worlds known as the "Edge" after attempting to warn the people that they needed to "repent for their sins" lest the Black Beast return. The truth, however, is that Hakumen had Jubei seal him within the "Edge" alongside Yuki Terumi to seal the latter away. After drifting in the "Edge" for hundreds of years, Kokonoe helped him return to the world, hoping to use him to defeat Terumi, but he set out to achieve his own agendas before being completely salvaged from the Edge. During his journey, he has also shown tremendous respect towards Bang and his unyielding spirit-something surprising given his normally strict disdain for others. Hakumen's true identity is Jin Kisaragi from an alternate time cycle called "Calamity Trigger", who fell into the Cauldron beneath Kagutsuchi trying to save Ragna from Nu-13. Transported to the distant past and wounded greatly, he was saved by Rachel and had his soul inserted into the Susano'o Unit, which Rachel came to possess after its original owner discarded it. In the finale of Central Fiction, after he prevents Nu from merging with Ragna, Hakumen is assaulted by Terumi, who destroys his soul to recover the Susano'o Unit as it was his true body. Despite this seemingly permanent death, at the end of the story Hakumen briefly reappears in some form to have one last talk with Trinity before fading away entirely. Though Hakumen is normally a cold, almost emotionless individual a hidden softer side is shown in his love for Tsubaki, who in his timeline died taking a fatal blow in his stead. His desire to save her stems from this, and he is one of her most stalwart allies throughout the story. He is also shown to deeply despise anybody who dares to hurt her, mainly Nu -No .13- as she was the one who caused Tsubaki a gruesome end in the previous timeline, where Noel did not exist. His Drive is called Zanshin (斬神 lit. Slaying God), which projects a shield-like energy barrier that, when hit by an opponent's attack, will negate said attack and follow-up with an unblockable, invincible counter-attack.

=== Nu-13/Juusan ===
Voiced by (English): Cristina Vee
Voiced by (Japanese): Kanako Kondō

Nu-13 (ニュー·サーティーン, Nyū-Sātīn; ν-13-, ν -No.13-) is the main antagonist of Calamity Trigger, and a Murakumo Unit created by Relius Clover, who was forged in Kagutsuchi's Gates of Sheol. Her weapon is the Nox Nyctores, Lux Sanctus: Murakumo (神輝・ムラクモ Shinki: Murakumo), a giant sword that breaks apart to become her armor and a set of floating swords. She was programmed, either by Relius or his partner, Hazama, to terminate anyone she deems as hostile subjects that come near the Gate. Despite normally acting as an emotionless girl who speaks in a mechanical fashion, Ragna's presence causes her to shift to the personality of a bubbly yet highly murderous girl who is in love with Ragna, showcasing traits typical of a yandere. Nu temporarily inhabits the body of a makeshift Murakumo unit named Lambda-11 during Continuum Shift, suffering amnesia and only remembering her love for Ragna. After she sacrifices herself to save Ragna from a fatal blow by Terumi, her soul leaves Lambda's body. After this, Hazama and Relius restore her in her original form and return her memories, reverting her back to her normal state while under their control. In Central Fiction, her negative emotions become dominant though her sanity begins to dwindle along with it. At the end of the series, Nu suffers a fatal defeat at the hands of Ragna and Hakumen. She is shown alive in the ending but catatonic, being cared for by Noel and Lambda. In Alternative: Dark War, Nu recovers from her catatonic state and develops a calmer personality, quite similar to Ragna. She also discards her former identity and begins calling herself Juusan. Nu uses her Drive, Sword Summoner, to attack with sword-like projectiles at different angles.

== Playable in BlazBlue: Continuum Shift ==
=== Tsubaki Yayoi/Izayoi ===
Voiced by (English): Julie Ann Taylor
Voiced by (Japanese): Asami Imai

Tsubaki Yayoi (ツバキ＝ヤヨイ) is Jin's childhood friend/relative and Noel's former roommate from the Military Academy and a member of the NOL's 0 Division. She is described as a straight-A student, and has a rather no-nonsense personality. She is very serious and reserved, and is a member of the dignified Yayoi family, and possesses romantic feelings for Jin. In the true ending of Calamity Trigger, where she appears as a sub-character, she is assigned by Hazama to kill Noel and Jin, though this is just a false mission to further Hazama's objectives. In Continuum Shift, Tsubaki learns from Hazama that she was originally Jin's secretary in the previous timelines before Noel took her place in the current. This revelation, along with Hazama's goading, leads her to hate Noel due to the perception that she took everything from her, though Hazama intentionally did not tell her that she died in the previous timelines. In the end, Tsubaki was placed under the control of Izanami through the Mind Eater spell, turning her into a cold and emotionless enforcer of Izanami's will. However, in Chrono Phantasma, Tsubaki is freed thanks to the efforts of Jin, Noel, and Makoto and is able to unlock the true power of her weapon, Izayoi (イザヨイ). In Central Fiction, Tsubaki learns from Jin that Ragna is his brother, and vows to help Jin out however she can. Though she disdains Ragna, she aids him as well for Jin's sake. Tsubaki also greatly admires Hakumen, though is unaware he is Jin until the end of the series, who in return is one of her most stalwart allies. In the end, once Izanami and Terumi's threats are over, Tsubaki and Makoto visit the church Noel has been residing, offering Noel a position in the newly reformed NOL alongside her and Makoto. Another Tsubaki from an alternate timeline appears in the end of the story, and though her appearance is obscured, the shape of her hair and possession of Hakumen's Okami implies she has inherited the Susano'o Unit and his duty as well. She teams up with Rachel to try and find Ragna, after he sacrificed himself to change the world into one of everlasting peace. This confirms in Alternative Dark War mobile spin-off that the particular Hakumen-look alike Tsubaki is from an alternate timeline and refer herself as White Justice. Tsubaki's weapon is the Sealed Weapon Izayoi (封印兵装・十六夜 Fūin Heisō – Izayoi), an Ars Armagus that enables her to control light, though it can potentially lead to blindness. Her Drive, Install, charges her Install Gauge.

Izayoi

Tsubaki's form that undertakes after gaining access to the true depths of the Izayoi's power as a prototype Murakumo Unit, introduced playable in Chrono Phantasma. Initially acting as the most extreme version of her mind-controlled self, she is returned to her true self by Noel, Jin, and Makoto. As a result, Tsubaki gains full access to this form at will. Her Drive is named Scarlet Justice, which increases the speed and power of all her special attacks while in Gain Art Mode. Izayoi was designed to kill Observers and other beings that normally cannot die, and as such possesses the "Immortal Breaker" ability that can do just that.

=== Hazama ===
Voiced by (English): Erik Davies (Calamity Trigger); Doug Erholtz (Alter Memory onward)
Voiced by (Japanese): Yūichi Nakamura

Hazama (ハザマ), also known by his extend code name Hazama Honoka (ハザマ＝ホノカ), a captain of the NOL's Intelligence Division and the main antagonist of Continuum Shift. He is an artificial human born from an Azure grimoire created by Relius to be a vessel for Terumi. Hazama fights with balisong knives and the Nox Nyctores, Geminus Anguium: Ouroboros (蛇双・ウロボロス, Jasō: Uroborosu). His Drive, Ouroboros, enables him to summon chains that can be used to quickly move through the battlefield or attack his opponents. In Calamity Trigger, he appears to be supervising Noel's actions to keep her in line, but he has a sinister hidden agenda. Initially, it appears that Hazama has no will of his own and is simply a body and alias for Terumi, yet Chrono Phantasma reveals that the two share control of the body. Whenever Terumi is in control of Hazama's body, he discards the former's fedora hat and spikes up his hair, while gaining a manic look to his face. In Central Fiction, after separating from Terumi following a near-fatal clash with Platinum the Trinity, Hazama has decided to no longer be Terumi's vessel and wants to pursue his own desires to comprehend the emotions of others. Hazama goes through with this by inflicting as much pain, both physical and psychological, on others as he can, though Naoto and Ragna put a stop to his machinations. After Hazama enters the Boundary, his fate is unknown. His appearance in Bloodedge Experience hints that the cauldron deposited him in Naoto's timeline.

Chris Hoadley of VentureBeat listed Hazama as "15 most significant new fighting game characters," where he stated, "As a fighter, Hazama is a terror in close range with his knife slashes and Jayoku Houtenjin kick super, but in order to reach that point, he needs to use special chains to whip him around the screen," and credited him paving the way for similar characters in Marvel vs. Capcom 3.

=== Lambda-11 ===
Voiced by (English): Cristina Vee
Voiced by (Japanese): Kanako Kondō

Lambda-11 (ラムダ·イレブン, Ramuda-Irebun; Λ-11-, Λ -No.11-) is an imitation Murakumo Unit created by Kokonoe by combining the body of the 11th experimental replica of Saya with the soul of Nu, which was recovered after falling into the Gates of Sheol during the conclusion of Calamity Trigger's Story Mode. Her Drive, Sword Summoner EX, is a copy of Nu's. Lambda's personality and self initially is deleted by Kokonoe to allow her to be a vessel for Nu. At the end of Continuum Shift, however, Nu sacrifices herself to protect Ragna from a fatal blow from Terumi, passing on her Idea Engine to him as she dies in his arms. Lambda's original self is resurrected in her own body once Izanami creates the Embryo, which she promptly enters in order to find Ragna. At the end of the series, Lambda is shown to have become a nun alongside Noel, and cares for a catatonic Nu. Lambda is in many ways a foil to Nu: she is calm, soft-spoken, and quiet, and while she loves Ragna like Nu, she wishes to protect and aid him rather than killing him. While Nu gradually becomes more aggressive and insane throughout the series, Lambda becomes more determined and stable, and accompanies Noel at the church.

When being re-introduced in Chrono Phantasma Extend, Lambda had a role to differentiate from Nu's play style, although most of her moves remain the same as Nu's.

== Playable in Blazblue: Continuum Shift II ==
=== Makoto Nanaya ===
Voiced by (English): Cindy Robinson
Voiced by (Japanese): Tomomi Isomura

Makoto Nanaya (マコト＝ナナヤ) is another classmate of Noel's and Jin's from the Military Academy, much like Tsubaki. She is a beastkin with squirrel-like features, and is considerably hyperactive with a short attention span though has surprisingly high intelligence. She is outgoing, adventurous, and has inhuman reflexes. She has a few complexes about her race but nonetheless proudly acknowledges who she is. She initially appears to be working under the NOL's Intelligence Division, but is actually an informant for Sector Seven. After officially defecting from the NOL, Makoto stays by Noel's side to help her throughout the story. At the end of the series, Makoto rejoins the newly reformed NOL with Tsubaki, and is last seen visiting Noel at her church. In battle, she fights using her specially-made cross tonfas, and her Drive, Impact, allows her to execute special attacks depending on the level of charge. Many characters in the story comment on Makoto having an unusually strong soul.

=== Platinum the Trinity ===
Voiced by (English): Laura Bailey (Continuum Shift II - Chrono Phantasma); Alexis Tipton (Alter Memory onward)
Voiced by (Japanese): Aoi Yūki

Platinum the Trinity (プラチナ＝ザ＝トリニティ, Purachina za Toriniti) is a young girl created by Trinity Glassfille, whose spirit inhabits her Nox Nyctores Arma Reboare: Muchōrin (雷轟・無兆鈴, Raigō: Muchōrin). While Trinity rarely possesses her and manifests herself for brief moments, Platinum has two co-existing personalities: a rude girl named Luna (ルナ, Runa) and a polite boy named Sena (セナ) who both cherish Jubei. In Central Fiction, Trinity transferred herself into Jin's Yukianesa to help him stop the machinations of Izanami and Terumi. But this has causes Platinum to begin fading away as Luna and Sena are unable to maintain their existences within the Embryo on their own. But they are saved by Jin and Trinity, the former's power enabling Platinium to exist independently of Trinity. After the deaths of Ragna and Terumi, Luna and Sena merge into one entity, and Trinity passes on. Platinum stays at Litchi's clinic in Kagutsuchi. Platinum's Drive, Magical Symphony, equips her with a special item to use in battle.

=== Valkenhayn R. Hellsing ===
Voiced by (English): Doug Stone
Voiced by (Japanese): Motomu Kiyokawa (BBCT - BBDW)

Valkenhayn R. Hellsing (ヴァルケンハイン＝Ｒ＝ヘルシング, Varukenhain Aru Herushingu) is one of the Six Heroes and Rachel's elderly butler and trusted adviser who has served the Alucard family line for generations. He possesses a sharp wit and is concerned for Rachel's well-being. Valkenhayn seems to be worried about Rachel associating with things below her class (particularly Ragna, although others might apply), but he always acts in a sophisticated and gentlemanly manner. Before Ragna devices his final plan to save the world from looping itself in Central Fiction, Valkenhayn bids him farewell and good luck. At the end of the series, Valkenhayn is last seen pouring a tea while waiting for Rachel's return. Valkenhayn was once partnered with Relius Clover as an assassin in the past, and initially tried to kill Rachel's father before changing his ways and working under him. His Drive, Werewolf, enables him to transform into a wolf.

== Playable in BlazBlue: Continuum Shift Extend ==
=== Relius Clover ===
Voiced by (English): Travis Willingham (CS - Alter Memory)
Voiced by (Japanese): Junichi Suwabe

Relius Clover (レリウス＝クローバー, Reriusu Kurōbā) is one of the three main antagonists of the series, alongside his partner, Yūki Terumi, and their mistress, Hades Izanami. Relius is Carl and Ada's father. He is a genius alchemist known as the Puppeteer, and revealed in Central Fiction to be formerly a wizard known as One of the Ten Sages, using both magic and science for his inventory. His inventions include the artificial human Hazama and his modifications to Saya's body, both of whom were used to host Terumi and Izanami respectively. He also created the Murakumo Units, which themselves consist of Nu-13, Lambda-11, and Mu-12, and the Nox Nyctores named Deus Machina: Nirvana, which he harvested his daughter's body to create. He completed the latter with help from Kokonoe of Sector Seven, only for his son Carl to steal it and use it against him. His own puppet, the Fluctus Redactum: Ignis (デトネーター・イグニス, Detonētā: Igunisu), was created from the body of his wife, Ignis, who is similar in appearance to Nirvana. He summons Ignis into battle with his Drive, Detonator. Relius's main goal is to recreate the world to his desires, despising a world where the Master Unit controls everything. Though his plans are stopped in Chrono Phantasma and he becomes despondent for a time, Relius decides to watch how the end of things will play out. In Central Fiction, Relius grooms Carl as his successor and enters the Boundary. His fate is unknown.

== Playable in BlazBlue: Chrono Phantasma ==
=== Amane Nishiki ===
Voiced by (English): Yuri Lowenthal
Voiced by (Japanese): Akira Ishida

Amane Nishiki (アマネ＝ニシキ) is an effeminate young man clad in a kimono who's drawn to battle like it is a dance stage. He is armed with a seemingly living piece of cloth and his Drive, Spiral, involves transforming it into drills. It is hinted that he is immortal and seems to be acquainted with Rachel, who calls him "Uzume." In Central Fiction, he decides to directly intervene with the story to bring about a good ending, and directly aids the main protagonists. It is implied he is a deity like Susano'o, and he seems to be familiar with the Arbiter, Es. Despite his higher existence, not even Amane is able to retain his memories of Ragna at the end of the story-a fact he is aware of. Thus, he makes sure to give Ragna his respect before he disappears from the world.

=== Bullet ===
Voiced by (English): Erin Fitzgerald
Voiced by (Japanese): Toa Yukinari

Bullet (バレット, Baretto) is a mercenary who's been fighting and moving from battlefield to battlefield since a young age. She lost her entire squad during a mission for Sector Seven that she was left out of, and she seeks Kokonoe to find her answers as to why the tragedy happened. She later learns that Azrael fatally injured her captain, leading his transformation into a cyborg Iron Tager when he was rescued by Kokonoe. Though Tager does not have memories as a human, he and Bullet cannot find a measure of closure for them. They remain partners at the end of the series. Her Drive, Lockon, allows her to rush towards her opponent to grab and throw them.

=== Azrael ===
Voiced by (English): D. C. Douglas
Voiced by (Japanese): Hiroki Yasumoto

Azrael (アズラエル, Azuraeru) is a fist-fighting soldier of Sector Seven whose strength seems unnaturally high. He enjoys violence and relishes the idea that he is fighting over life and death. Azrael's philosophy is to use only his own strength and nothing else, save for self-imposed limitations on his power. One of his victims was Bullet's captain, who becomes a cyborg known as Iron=Tager, leading Bullet to initially blame Sector Seven due to her squad working with them at the time. Though locked away by Sector Seven after the incident, the leaders of the organization later free him to work for them as a countermeasure against Kokonoe, who they believe is beginning to act against them. Azrael instead uses this as a chance to go on a warpath to engage in life-or-death fights once more. During a coliseum battle set up as a trap to lure him out by Kagura, he reveals to Bullet that he was the one who fatally injured her captain in the past before nearly killing her. Ragna later steps up to fight him, where Azrael attempts to goad him into using all of his Azure so he may fight Ragna at his most wild, uncontrolled state. Unimpressed that Ragna suppressed himself from being controlled by the Azure, he fights Kagura, who takes Ragna's place. Though Kagura traps him in a dimensional prison, he breaks free in Central Fiction. Azrael works with Izanami to fulfill his goal of finding a fight that would bring him to the brink of death. However, Azrael is captured by Kagura and Jin, and is sealed away by Kokonoe. His Drive, The Terror, allows him to find weak points on his opponents to exploit.

=== Kagura Mutsuki ===
Voiced by (English): Grant George
Voiced by (Japanese): Keiji Fujiwara (BBCP - BBCF); Daisuke Namikawa (BBDW onward)

Kagura Mutsuki (カグラ＝ムツキ) Kagura is the representative Novus Orbis Librarium officer in the 5th Hierarchical City of Ibukido, and is known by the nickname "Black Knight". He is one of the disciples of Tenjo and plotting to overthrow the NOL to fulfill his master's wishes to have his master's son succeed as the true Imperator and reforming NOL. Kagura is also a member of the powerful Mutsuki family. Despite his position, Kagura is a laid-back individual who enjoys a wilder, flirtatious lifestyle. Despite this, he truly cares about the people of the world and is willing to do anything to create a better future for the NOL. Kagura works with Kokonoe and provides much aid for the main cast from Chrono Phantasma onward. His Drive, Black Gale, puts him into a stance where he can perform different moves.

=== Kokonoe ===
Voiced by (English): Julie Ann Taylor
Voiced by (Japanese): Chie Matsūra

Kokonoe Mercury (ココノエ＝マーキュリー) is Tager's superior at Sector Seven, Roy (who became Arakune) and Litchi's former employer and Jubei and Nine's daughter. She is a half-beastkin, a child of two of the Six Heroes, though she shows unexplained disdain for this fact, supposedly "staying angry for weeks" when Jubei is mentioned. Kokonoe is a rather serious and cynical woman with no regard for emotions, and always strives for Tager to complete his missions without fail. However, she can on rare occasions be quite personable, mostly around her creations. She is displayed and perceived as cranky most of the time, though she harbors much sadness and rage beneath her usual facade. Her true mission is to kill Terumi whom she held a grudge against due to him supposedly killing her mother which somehow led her mother's downfall as well. Due to the fact that Terumi grows stronger the more one hates him, however, she has learned to temper her hatred enough that during one of her arcade scenarios, Terumi is utterly powerless against her. Kokonoe is a powerful magic user herself, but dislikes using it and prefers to use her inventions in combat. After assisting Ragna from Continuum Shift onward, she would later seal away Azrael thanks Jin and Kagura at the end of the series and still acts as Tager's superior, then now also Bullet's too after the mercenary was ready to learn the truth and reconcile with her cybernized captain. With her Drive, Graviton, Kokonoe uses a small machine that pulls her opponent towards it.

=== Yūki Terumi/Susano'o ===
Voiced by (English): Doug Erholtz (Terumi); Ray Chase (Susanoo)
Voiced by (Japanese): Yūichi Nakamura (Terumi); Kenta Miyake (Susanoo)

Yūki Terumi (ユウキ＝テルミ) is the leading antagonist of the series and a member of the Six Heroes. He works alongside Hades Izanami and Relius Clover, while causing many of the tragedies that occur throughout the series. He was originally the Sankishin Takehaya Susano'o (タケハヤスサノオ) (or simply spelled as Susanoo), a brother deity to Amaterasu whom he served and grew to hate to the point of gaining his freedom by separating his soul from his body, as it becomes the Susanoo Unit later used by Hakumen. Using host bodies like Kazuma Kval and later Hazama, becoming maniacal compared to his more calm original self, Terumi caused the creation of the Black Beast and the Azure Grimoire, betraying his fellow Heroes once the Black Beast was destroyed. He then oversaw the establishment of NOL and Sector Seven while kidnapping Saya to use as Izanami's host. Like Hazama, he uses the Nox Nyctores Geminus Anguium: Ouroboros and balisong knives, Terumi utilizes a more brutal and aggressive style. With his Drive, Force Eater, his attacks have heavy Heat Gauge gain, while the opponent gains none from being hit by (or blocking) them. As Susanoo his Drive is called Divine Warrior where he uses it to unlock more moves and has a more brutal fighting style but Susanoo's appearance in Cross Tag Battle no longer has the seals, and all of its exclusive seal moves are usable by default in the said crossover game. Susanoo's personality was calmer but more controlled rage fueled compared to his own self.

After separating from Hazama in Chrono Phantasma, his former host nearly killed by Platinum, Terumi survived being destroyed by Hakumen by using self-observation as revealed in Central Fiction along with using the fear and hate of others to maintain himself temporary. With only a week left before he dissipates, unable to reclaim Hazama within the Embyro, Terumi raids the tomb of Clavis Alucard to acquire a relic known as Hihirokane that was meant to destroy him. Terumi bides his time until Noel absorbs and imprisons Izanami into her soul and becomes Saya again to force Hakumen's soul out of the Susanoo Unit and merge back into his body. Restored to his true self, Terumi absorbs Saya (Noel and Izanami together) to access the Azure, as he attempts to destroy everything. However, Jin and Trinity save Noel and Hakumen, and Ragna defeats Terumi in the Azure void.

In an alternate continuity after Central Fiction, depicted in a crossover game BlazBlue: Cross Tag Battle however, Takamagahara system had been preserving the combat data of Susano'o before Terumi's death. When Hazama enters the Takamagahara system's white room, he inadvertently use the Keystone to create a new world by connecting BlazBlue multiverses and other unseen completely different universes. As a result of his presence inside the white room, Takamagahara scans the remains of Terumi within Hazama's body, creating an incomplete clone of Susano'o. Despite its incomplete state, the Susano'o clone is as dangerous as the original and will still endanger the multiverse. As the time of multiverse's destruction is nearing fast, Hazama and the system to host a stamp collecting contest to find worthy contestants who can defeat the clone. Eventually, Naoto Kurogane and Ragna defeated the clone, yet the sentient Keystone system is still recovering from a result of holding off the clone from breaking free when "she" entrusted Hazama a role on hosting the contest, leaving otherworldly contestant to join a tag team battle royale until "her" full recovery.

== Playable in BlazBlue: Chrono Phantasma Extend ==
=== Celica A. Mercury ===
Voiced by (English): Carrie Savage
Voiced by (Japanese): Iori Nomizu

Celica A. Mercury (セリカ＝A＝マーキュリー, Serika Ē Mākyurī) is Nine's younger sister, and Kokonoe's aunt. She is a powerful magic healer whose true power is the control over the flow of life, though she cannot heal seithr poisoning. During the Phase Shift novels, Celica briefly traveled with the hero Bloodedge during the Dark War, whilst trying to find information about her father, Shūichirō Ayatsuki. After the Dark War, she watched over the Black Beast's remains and built a church, waiting for a chance to reunite with Bloodedge. She was also the caretaker of Ragna, Jin, and Saya, and was killed by Yūki Terumi's attack on the church in 2192. Despite this, in Chrono Phantasma, Kokonoe makes a copy of Celica's soul, using a time when Celica temporarily entered the Boundary and placing it in a cloned body, reincarnating her in the modern time as a time-displaced being called a 'Chronophantasma.' However, this Celica has a short lifespan as she was created for the sole purpose of activating 'Kushinada's Lynchpin,' A weapon capable of disrupting the flow of seithr, before her status as a Chronophantasma makes her fade away. Due to another method being found, Celica is able to remain in the present for longer than expected. Shortly after sending the heroes after Izanami during their final attempt to stop her, Celica finally fades out of existence with a tearful goodbye to Ragna and Noel. Celica's weapon is Ex Machina: Minerva (自動人形・ミネルヴァ, Ekusu Makina: Mineruva), an automaton that was created by Kokonoe and copied from the Nox Nyctores, Deus Machina: Nirvana. Its purpose is to protect Celica and amplify her powers. Celica's Drive, Minerva, enables her to control Minerva in battle.

== Playable in BlazBlue: Central Fiction ==
=== Hibiki Kohaku ===
Voiced by (Japanese): Mitsuhiro Ichiki

Hibiki Kohaku (ヒビキ＝コハク) is an assassin from the Kohaku clan and an assistant to Kagura, providing support and back-up for him from a nearby distance. As Kagura's servant and assistant, he is loyal to a fault and would do whatever he is commanded. Despite this, he has a sharp tongue and often criticizes Kagura's actions often (such as excessive drinking or his behavior towards women), though Hibiki admits that he truly admires Kagura. He is described as "a pretty boy with a poison tongue". His arcade scenario in Central Fiction shows the possibility that Hibiki may in truth wish to assassinate Kagura and his own emotions with him, turning him into the perfect killing. Ultimately, however, this scenario never comes to pass, and Hibiki remains loyal to Kagura to the end. Hibiki's Drive, Double Chase, allows him to make a duplicate of himself.

=== Naoto Kurogane ===
Voiced by (English): Billy Kametz (Cross Tag Battle 1.5 - 2.0)
Voiced by (Japanese): Nobunaga Shimazaki

Naoto Kurogane (ナオト＝クロガネ or 黒鉄ナオト, Kurogane Naoto), born Naoto Terumi (輝弥ナオト, Terumi Naoto) is the main protagonist of the novel series, Bloodedge Experience. He is from an alternate timeline than the main games and is gifted with the Hunter's Eye, which allows him to see the 'life-force' value of others. Much like Ragna, he becomes a servant to a vampire named Raquel Alucard, who seems to be the Rachel Alucard of his world. His life-force value hovered around 9,810 until he became Raquel's servant. In Central Fiction, Naoto searches for Raquel, who mysteriously disappeared, and made his way into the main timeline. As revealed by Relius, Naoto did at one point exist in the main timeline, but has been long dead after Clavis Alucard killed him. When he talks to Raquel through Rachel, he is tasked by his mistress to save the world he is currently in, as their world is connected and is in danger of disappearing due to the problems in the main timeline. His sister, Saya Terumi, is hinted to be the basis for the 5th Prime Field Device, potentially making him the uncle of Ragna, Jin and Noel/Saya. After helping Ragna calm down at a point in the story where he almost lost himself to rage, Naoto's purpose in the main timeline is fulfilled and he is sent to his own timeline, where he reunites with Raquel. With his Drive, Bloodedge, Naoto creates iron objects from blood. His brown eyes turn red and his brown hair turns white through heavy usage, making him resemble Ragna.

=== Nine the Phantom ===
Voiced by (English): Amanda C. Miller
Voiced by (Japanese): Ayumi Fujimura (CP - Cross Tag Battle 1.0); Rie Tanaka (Cross Tag Battle 2.0 onwards)

Konoe A. Mercury (コノエ＝A＝マーキュリ, Konoe Ē Mākyurī), more commonly known by the alias Nine (ナイン, Nain), is a witch and one of the Six Heroes. She passed down her knowledge of magic to mankind during the Dark War. During the Dark War, she journeyed alongside Bloodedge and later created the Nox Nyctores in order to help humans fight against the Black Beast. After the war, she married Jubei and started a family with him, giving birth to Kokonoe. Unfortunately, she discovered what Terumi's future plans were, for which he supposedly killed her. In truth, Nine survived and fell into the Boundary, where she learned the truth of the world. Enraged at being subject to the whims of the Origin within the Amaterasu Unit, Nine began to plot the destruction of the Amaterasu Unit and the recreation of the world with an artificial 'god' in Amaterasu's place, where the world would not loop due to the desires of any one being. To this end, she allows Izanami to manipulate her, disguising herself as the enigmatic Phantom (ファントム, Fantomu). In Central Fiction, Nine returns as a shadow of her true self, filled with unquenchable rage and sorrow who cares only for Celica, and enact her plans. Though she desires to kill Ragna as she blames him for the world's state due to the Master Unit reversing time to try and save him, she is later defeated by him after an intense fight. After recognizing Ragna's potential to change the way of the world, Nine makes peace with her husband and daughter and buys the protagonists time to figure out a way to stop Izanami by freezing time around her temporarily, before fading away. Nine does not possess a drive, which makes her exceedingly strong, and instead relies on her mastery of magic in combat. In-game, this manifests as a trait called The Abyss Diver, which activates a spell stored in her Active Slot.

=== Hades Izanami ===
Voiced by (English): Kate Higgins
Voiced by (Japanese): Yukana

Hades Izanami (冥王イザナミ, Meio Izanami) is one of the main antagonists of the BlazBlue series, and one of the masterminds behind all the misdeeds throughout the series. She is the main antagonist of Chrono Phantasma and the majority of Central Fiction. Using Saya as her vessel, Izanami plots to bring permanent death to the entire world, killing off all life forever and leaving an empty, silent world. She first appears at the end of Continuum Shift as the NOL Imperator, before later giving up the position willingly as she no longer requires it for her plans. She is the drive of the Master Unit Amaterasu, and is its power of 'destruction.' This makes her the embodiment of death in the real world, meaning she cannot truly be killed. By the time of Central Fiction her host body is beginning to fail and deteriorate. Relius reveals that not many bodies would be able to host her without immediately decaying or falling apart, and that it truly speaks to Saya's power that it could hold Izanami as long as it did. Initially cold, unfeeling, and emotionless, her time using Saya as a vessel causes her to develop a sense of self and personality, basically creating a soul of her own. After speaking with Relius on the nature of her existence, she decides that because she revels in the death and despair she causes that her desire to cause the death of the world is not due to being Amaterasu's drive but because of her own desires. Though she comes dangerously close to achieving her objective of the death of all life, Ragna helps Noel recreate Saya by imprisoning Izanami into her soul, where she remains to this day by the end of the series. Notably, this is the only time in the series where Izanami truly feels fear, as her imprisonment within Noel's soul results in the destruction of her own soul afterwards – the only way her soul can truly die, though her mind still lingers within Noel's mind. It is unknown when and how exactly Izanami can resist Noel. With her Drive, Sharin <Exodus Arc>, Izanami activates her weapon, Yasakani no Magatama (ヤサカニノ禍魂), allowing her to shoot Magatama projectiles, but removing her ability to block.

=== Es ===
Voiced by (Japanese): Mayuka Nomura

Es (えす, Esu) is the primary heroine of XBlaze series. She is also the true identity of Nobody (ノーバディ, Nōbadi), one of the main characters of the game. She makes her first playable appearance in BlazBlue: Central Fiction, introduced in the console version as DLC. Es's Drive, Crests Arts, turns the trail of her sword attacks into a trail of damage dealing Crests. She is the gate keeper of the Azure, and her duty sees her memories repressed and her returned to the emotionless state she first appeared in within her own series. Despite this, her memories will occasionally resurface, and she retains her deep love of pudding. She goes by the name Es Mitsurugi (御剣えす, Mitsurugi Esu), disguising herself as a high school student within XBlaze universe. Es is implied to have a history with Amane given their interactions. She is later revealed to be a false gatekeeper designed to draw attention away from Ragna, the true gatekeeper. After the end of the story, Es remains guarding the gate to the Azure though she later disappears. There are some hints that Es is guarding the gate and may simply be a recreation of the real one, but nothing is outright stated.

=== Mai Natsume ===
Voiced by (Japanese): Saori Hayami

Mai Natsume (マイ＝ナツメ) is the protagonist of the Heart manga series duology (Remix Heart and Variable Heart), two side-stories in Chrono Phantasma Extend, and introduced as a playable character in the console version of Central Fiction. She is a cheerful and forward-looking, sincerely sympathetic towards others and valuing her friends above all else. Mai attended the Military Academy, alongside Noel Vermillion, Tsubaki Yayoi, Makoto Nanaya and Kajun Faycott. Later, Mai and Kajun work with Kokonoe at Sector Seven. Though she had missed her friends for many years, Mai reappears in Central Fiction, assisting them in the final battle. At the end of the series, Mai and Kajun help Platinum acclimate to a normal life in Kagutsuchi. Her true name is Mai Hazuki (マイ＝ハヅキ) and she is the heir of one of the twelve noble families that govern the world. Mai was originally male but was transformed into a girl when he inadvertently became the vessel of the Nameless Grimoire (名もなき魔道書, Namonaki Madōsho), as the grimoire changed his sex and gender to suit the 'reflection of his heart'. Initially unsure about his new gender and wishing to find a way to return to his original sex, Mai begins to come to view herself as female and eventually accepts who she really is inside. She obtained a spear during Variable Heart called Gallia Sphyra: Outseal (朱弾(ガリアスフィラ)=アウトシール, Garia Sufira: Autoshīru) which she has used ever since. It is a Legacy Weapon replica that is as powerful as a Nox Nyctores. Her Drive has the same name as her spear and enables her to throw Outseal at her opponent, which she can change the direction of mid-flight and home into enemies if it initially misses.

=== Jubei ===
Voiced by (English): Kirk Thornton
Voiced by (Japanese): Masaki Terasoma

Jubei (獣兵衛, Jubē), also known as Mitsuyoshi (ミツヨシ), is one of the Six Heroes and Ragna's master who battled the Black Beast alongside Hakumen. As revealed in Phase 0, he was originally named Mitsuyoshi, and did not take up the name Jubei until the end of the Dark War. He is a beast-man and Kokonoe's father. It is revealed that Taokaka and her clan were genetically engineered from his DNA. Jubei's weapon is the Nox Nyctores, Mucro Somnio: Musashi (夢刀・六三四, Mujin: Musashi), which is a pair of kodachi blades that can cut "what cannot normally be cut."

=== Trinity Glassfille ===
Voiced by (English): Laura Bailey (BBCS - BBCP); Alexis Tipton (Alter Memory onward)
Voiced by (Japanese): Aoi Yūki

Trinity Glassfille (トリニティ＝グラスフィール, Toriniti Gurasufīru) is a member of the Six Heroes who made a name for herself as the Platinum Alchemist (プラチナ＝アルケミスト, Purachina Arukemisuto) during the Dark War before sealing her soul in her Nox Nyctores, Arma Reboare: Muchōrin which is currently used by her creation and host body Platinum the Trinity. She studied at the Magic Guild alongside Celica and Nine. Due to a comment dropped by Hazama, she was implied to be indirectly responsible for allowing him to kill Nine, due to him tricking her into releasing Nine's "Ruby: Mind Eater" spell, which forces him to kill both Trinity and Nine, as explained in one of the Phase Shift novels. In Central Fiction, Trinity separated from Luna and Sena and transferred herself into Yukianesa to aid Jin, later enabling the two kids to coexist in their shared vessel harmoniously and independently of her as she passes on to the afterlife. In June 2026, she was announced as an upcoming DLC character for Blazblue Central Fiction.

== Playable in BlazBlue Alternative: Dark War ==
=== Rei ===
The avatar character working for Mitsurugi Agency.

=== Ciel Sulfur ===
Voiced by: Rina Honnizumi

Ciel Sulfur (シエル＝サルファー, Shieru Sarufā) is the agent of Mitsurugi Agency. She also appears as a bonus chibi avatar in BlazBlue: Cross Tag Battle.

=== White Justice ===
Voiced by: Asami Imai

White Justice (ホワイトジャスティス, Howaito Jasutisu), much like how Hakumen being an alternate future Jin from the destroyed Calamity Trigger timeline, is an alternate Tsubaki Yayoi who dons a sister counterpart to Susano’o unit, the White Justice unit. She first appears in Central Fiction.

== Non-playable characters ==
=== Ada Clover ===
Voiced by (Japanese): Chiaki Takahashi

Ada Clover (エイダ＝クローバー, Eida Kurōbā) is Carl's older sister, and frequently doted on him when she was still human. Due to her affection, Carl idolized her, and frequently spoke highly of her to his friends at school (much to their amusement). One day, for reasons unknown, she agreed to become the subject of one of her father's experiments, but according to the story, there was a possibility Ada was forced.

=== Amateratsu ===
The Amateratsu Unit also known as the Master Unit is one of the three Sankishin units and the sister unit to Tsukuyomi and Susanoo. Amateratsu is a giant Satellite machine that is the most powerful of the original units due to warping reality. It was discovered by Humanity and was give the Izanagi systerm and the Izanami. It was wield by the Origin the first prime field device.

=== Black Beast ===
The Black Beast (黒き獣, Kuroki Kemono) is the legendary beast that threatened to cause much calamity before the series' start. It was confronted by the Six Heroes and sealed away. In actuality, it is a combination of Ragna and Nu-13 fusing together inside of the Cauldron (i.e. Ragna is its body, and Nu was its heart). Ragna can transform into the Black Beast on their own in the bad endings, and Arakune is in the process of becoming one in Central Fiction. It was revealed that during the Prime Field War, humanity created the first Black Beast to kill all the Prime Field Devices out of fear that they would become a danger to humanity. Humanity created the Takamagahara System to manipulate time so that they would be able to use the Amaterasu Unit to recreate the world after the inevitable destruction of it from the conflict of the Black Beast and the Prime Field Devices. However, the Prime Field Device that had first succeeded in contacting Amaterasu utilized it before they could, recreating the world and becoming the 'god' of it. A different Black Beast is mentioned in XBlaze and is implied to be the Yamata-No-Orochi of Japanese legend.

=== Bloodedge ===
Voiced by (English): Patrick Seitz
Voiced by (Japanese): Tomokazu Sugita

Bloodedge (ブラッドエッジ, Buraddoejji) was an ordinary man who single-handedly halted the Black Beast for an entire year during the Dark War and gave the Six Heroes the time to teach humanity magic to fight back. His sword and jacket are now in Ragna's possession following his death, though it is revealed that Bloodedge is actually Ragna from the original future of Calamity Trigger timeline where Noel Vermillion did not exist during Chrono Phantasma. Bloodedge and Hakumen (the latter being formerly Jin) were the only survivors of the timeline they originated from. Due to Bloodedge's heroic sacrifice against Black Beast, this leaves Hakumen as the sole survivor of original Calamity Trigger timeline to be living in the current timeline.

=== Claire Vermillion ===
Claire Vermillion (クレア＝ヴァーミリオン, Kurea Vāmirion) is Noel's foster mother. She cannot conceive naturally, and as such the noble family were without an heir, until her husband Edgar adopted the Murakumo unit Mu-12 out of pity. Claire is kind and caring towards Noel, but is not afraid to discipline.

=== Clavis Alucard ===
Voiced by (Japanese): Tamio Ōki

Clavis Alucard (クラヴィス＝アルカード, Kuravisu Arukādo; also incorrectly romanized as Claudius Alucard) was the previous head of the Alucard family, said to have lived for over a millennium. He watched over the human race and helped prevent the Black Beast from destroying them, as well as sealing Yūki Terumi inside the Boundary before the Six Heroes were formed. Rachel Alucard is his daughter, and Valkenhayn R. Hellsing served as his butler before (and after) working with the Six Heroes. Though deceased by the time of the games, he appears during Ragna's trip to the Dark Wars in Chrono Phantasma. Central Fiction reveals the connection with Naoto Kurogane's fates, whereas he killed Naoto in the main timeline, while in Bloodedge Experience not only he spare Naoto's life, also have a daughter named Raquel instead of Rachel.

=== Edgar Vermillion ===
Edgar Vermillion (エドガー＝ヴァーミリオン, Edogā Vāmirion) is Noel's foster father and the head of the once-noble Vermillion family. Following the Ikaruga Civil War, he, out of pity, adopted the Murakumo unit Mu-12 as his daughter Noel. Shortly thereafter, the Vermillion family lost their nobility after Edgar harshly criticized the NOL's ruthless actions. The NOL then charged both he and his wife Claire with treason, and threatened to exile the household from the Control Organization, forcing the couple to go into hiding. Like Claire, he too cares deeply for Noel's well-being.

=== Homura Amanohokosaka ===
Voiced by (Japanese): Inori Minase

The son of the former NOL Imperator Tenjō Amanohokosaka. Following the abandonment of the post by Izanami, he assumes his rightful role as Imperator. In the Japanese games, Homura's gender is never specified.

=== Ignis Clover ===
Ignis Clover (イグニス＝クローバー, Igunisu Kurōbā) is Relius Clover's wife, and Ada and Carl's mother. Like her daughter, she was transformed by her husband into the battle doll named Fluctus Redactum: Ignis (デトネーター・イグニス, Detonētā: Igunisu; Detonator: Ignis). She does the bidding of Relius Clover, engaging in combat on his command. She is one of Relius' Detonators whose powers can rival those of the Nox Nyctores.

=== Ikaruga Ninjas ===
One of Bang Shishigami's familiars and remnants to the proud ninjas of Ikaruga. They live in Ronin-Gai after surviving the Ikaruga Civil War.

=== Totokaka ===
A wise and old member of the Kaka Clan who seemingly supervises the entire clan. Unlike most other members, she is intelligent, speaking articulately and lacking the feline verbal tic common among them.

=== Kajun Faycott ===
Voiced by (Japanese): Saki Fujita

Kajun Faycott (カジュン＝ファイコット, Kajun Faikotto) is one of the main characters of the manga series, BlazBlue: Remix Heart and BlazBlue: Variable Heart. She is Mai Natsume's eccentric roommate at the Military Academy. However, in reality she was an undercover agent from Sector Seven sent by Kokonoe to obtain the Burning Red Grimoire.

In Cross Tag Battle, Kajun is one of the main lobby characters who greet the player and act as the guide for the game's initial portion.

=== Kazuma Kuvaru ===
Kazuma Kuvaru (カズマ＝クヴァル) is the protagonist of the novel BlazBlue: Phase Shift 1, but turned into one of the main antagonists within the current Phase Shift series. Suffering from amnesia and hallucinations, Kazuma is unable to remember anything seven years prior to the start of Phase Shift 1. He disliked physical activities, and preferred to stay in-door reading. With Relius Clover (his tutor at the time), he apparently traveled the world, then studied at the Magic Guild. Apparently, due to being quiet and disliking the outdoors, some people become uneasy around him. He was actually an artificial body for Yuki Terumi in which he succeeds in merging with him and was lost in the Boundary with his successor Hazama taking his place. Despite perishing, his legacy lives on in the form Terumi takes as a ghost, or rather particularly Hazama.

=== Linhua ===
Voiced by (Japanese): Yukiko Kato

Linhua (リンファ, Rinfa) is a young girl and Litchi's assistant in her clinic in Orient Town. She admittedly looks up to Litchi, and even looks out for her well-being, to the point where she even fights against Tager in the story to protect her, punching his giant, metal hide until her fists is damaged.

=== Lord Tenjō Amanohokosaka ===
Lord Tenjō (卿テンジョー, Kyō Tenjō) was Bang Shishigami's former teacher and the founder of Ikaruga, whom Jin killed in the Ikaruga Civil War. This caused Bang to seek revenge on him. In one of Bang's endings in Story Mode, Valkenhayn R. Hellsing mentions that Lord Tenjō's son, Homura might still be alive, which then confirmed in Chrono Phantasma, where Homura is under Kagura's protection. Bang heads to Ikaruga in his canon ending to find the answers he seeks.

=== Nago and Gii ===
Voiced by (English): Cindy Robinson (Gii)
Voiced by (Japanese): Masaru Suzuki (Nago); Sena Tsubaki (Gii; Calamity Trigger ~ Continuum Shift); Saeko Zogo (Gii; Chrono Phantasma ~ onward); Kazue Fujita (Gii; Drama CD)

Rachel's servants who are her weapons in battle. Nago (ナゴ) is Rachel's black transmogrifying cat that speaks and acts just as snobbishly as her. He is often seen in umbrella form but he could also morph into and be used as either a Lobelia (bat lance) cannon or a comfy chair. Gii (ギイ) is Rachel's stout red bat familiar. He is often burdened by Rachel's orders during teatime, or her fits wherein she has the penchant of either using him as a footrest or pinching his cheek. Due to his chubbiness, he is either mistaken for a flying pig or have at least been threatened to be eaten twice in the Story Mode.

=== Raquel Alucard ===
Voiced by (English): Mela Lee
Voiced by (Japanese): Kana Ueda

Raquel Alucard (ラケル＝アルカード) is one of the main characters in Bloodedge Experience light-novel. Her life-force value hovers around 80,000,000. She is the one who revived Naoto through turning him into a dhampir like Rachel did on Ragna, giving him the power of the Azure and the Drive, Bloodedge, in which regenerated his old right arm and manifested a weapon from his blood.

In Central Fiction, the reality where she and Naoto come from is destroyed, but since Raquel is connected to the Boundary, she managed to send Naoto to another world, which is the starting point of their world's possibility. Raquel warned Naoto that he should not touch the fragment of the Blue, and she briefly possessed her counterpart, Rachel to explain to Naoto what happened to him, asking him to save their world. After Ragna recreated his world at cost of ceasing his own existence, Raquel was seen near Naoto, but it is unknown whether they were in their own restored reality, or in the prime universe.

=== Saya ===
Voiced by (English): Cristina Vee (Calamity Trigger and Continuum Shift);

Kate Higgins (Continuum Shift Extend ~ onward [As Izanami])

Voiced by (Japanese): Kanako Kondō (Calamity Trigger and Continuum Shift); Yukana (Continuum Shift Extend ~ onward [As Izanami])

Saya (サヤ) is the younger sister of Jin and Ragna. She was born with a frail body, which led to Ragna caring for her. This caused her brother Jin to grow jealous of her for having more quality time with Ragna than him, and he began to bully her to get Ragna back into his life. Jin's jealousy grew so much that he eventually attempted to kill her with the Nox Nyctores, Yukianesa, immediately after she gave it to him as a gift to prevent bullying. However, it is hinted that, in Central Fiction, Jin's attempt to kill her was instead brought on by insanity induced by Yukianesa, and that Saya giving it to him was part of his delusions. She was kidnapped by Yūki Terumi shortly after and was given to Relius Clover to be used as a "vessel" for Hades Izanami. In Central Fiction, it is revealed that Saya's body was heavily modified by Relius to better suit Izanami, though it is falling apart by that point in time. Izanami references Saya's feelings throughout the series, mainly to taunt Ragna. After Noel defeats and seals Izanami, they merge and bring Saya back within their memories. Because Saya prefers to use the name 'Noel', Izanami cannot possess her reunified body or escape from her. After assimilating the Origin from the Master Unit, Saya loses all of her memories as Izanami due to Ragna's self-sacrificial actions, and therefore goes by just 'Noel'. She and Lambda-11 work at the church she grew up in, as they care for the catatonic Nu-13.

=== Shūichirō Ayatsuki ===
Shūichirō Ayatsuki (シュウイチロウ＝アヤツキ) was a scientist, alive before the Dark War. He is the father of Nine and Celica, and later the father-in-law of Jubei and the grandfather of Kokonoe. Shūichirō Ayatsuki was a scientist working with Relius Clover and to some extent Yuki Terumi, referred as the man with green hair and a snake-like smile, before the emergence of the Black Beast. He died shortly after its creation.

=== System No. XX ===
The female voice within the Keystone in Cross Tag Battle. She tricks Ragna and his friends into bringing it to the goal, but they defeat her.

=== Takamagahara ===
Voiced by (English): Geoffrey Chalmers, Bryce Papenbrook, and Wendee Lee
Voiced by (Japanese): Unknown

The Takamagahara (タカマガハラ) are three entities named TA, TB, and TC. The Takamagahara is the "supreme program" created by mankind, and its goal is to destroy the Master Unit, Amaterasu, so that it can control the flow of space and time and give existence a cold, mechanical sense of order. It is also the one responsible for the time loops in Calamity Trigger every time their plans fail. In Continuum Shift, Terumi tricks Takamagahara with the help of the Izayoi to blind them, using Ragna defeating Mu as a distraction, and upload a virus created by Phantom to infect them, so that Izanami can take over its powers and use them for her plan.

=== The Origin ===
Voiced by: Yukana

The Origin is the first Prime Field Device and the one who discovered the Master Unit: Amaterasu. She started to develop a will and as such was sealed away by humanity in the Boundary. After the Prime Field Wars destroyed the world, the Origin recreated the world using the Master Unit and became its 'god' in the process. She is often referred to synonymously with the name Amaterasu, though she is not the deity that gives its namesake to the Unit. Despite this, the Origin does not wish for this and wants to be freed of her duty, and has come to see Ragna as her "hero" that would save her. Every time Ragna dies or the world reaches a point where Ragna could not reach her, the Origin would reset it until Ragna found a greater path. It is due to this that the Origin has earned the ire of many other characters, notably Terumi and Izanami, whose war against each other for conquest of the world is always interrupted by the Origin's many time resets. Eventually, Noel reveals herself as the Origin's "true hero", as the two women are actually two quarters of Saya's soul. Noel, who has already merged with Saya's other two quarters, Mu-12 and Izanami (willingly with the former and forcibly with the latter), proves this by merging with the Origin, freeing her from her position in the 'Master Unit' and repairing Saya under Noel's control. Despite this, Ragna speaks to another being inside the Master Unit, showing the traits for Saya and Naoto's sister, Saya Terumi. It is unknown if this is a piece of the Origin left in the unit, Amaterasu, or another entity.

=== Tomonori ===
Tomonori (トモノリ) was Jubei's younger brother, Konoe's brother-in-law and Kokonoe's uncle, whom Terumi killed in BlazBlue: Phase Shift 1.

=== Torakaka ===
Voiced by (Japanese): Kaori Yagi

Torakaka (トラカカ) is a warrior of the Kaka clan. She is Taokaka's mentor, former village guardian, and is very knowledgeable about the current situation, as she is able to seemingly recognize Litchi being seduced by the Azure Grimoire in an injured Ragna's possession and stop her from acting on the impulse. Contrary to how Torakaka looks, she speaks quite dignified and sparingly uses the feline verbal tic Taokaka has. Tager also comments on how much more clever she is than the rest of the Kaka clan.

=== Tsukuyomi ===
The Tsukuyomi Unit is a giant shield wielded by Rachel, and one of the three Sankishin units brother of Amateratsu and Susanoo. It is by far the most mysterious among the siblings.

== Xblaze characters ==
=== Toya Kagari ===
Voiced by: Yukitoshi Kikuchi

An artificial human born in the Original Grymoire within the power similar to Ragna. In Alternative Dark War, a version of Toya called Hearn appears as a boss.

=== Hinata Himezuru ===
Voiced by: Rei Mochizuki

Yuki's adopted sister and the titular Code Embryo.

=== Kuon Glamred Stroheim ===
Voiced by: Yui Kondo

A user of the Legacy Weapon: Sealed Spear Izayoi.

=== Mei Amanohokosaka ===
Voiced by: Inori Minase

The Azure priestess, and Tenjo and Homura's ancestor.

=== Akira Kamewari ===
Voiced by: Yoshimasa Hosoya

Toya's friend with the willpower similar to the power of order.

=== Marcelyn F. Mercury ===
Voiced by: Chie Matsura

One of the Ten Saints under Zwei and Nine's ancestor. Her pseudonym is Ringo Akagi.

=== Yuki Himezuru ===
Voiced by: Tomomi Isomura

Hinata's adoptive sister and Ripper's daughter.

=== Elise von Klagen ===
Voiced by: Nozomi Yamamoto

A messenger of the Magic Guild and Kuon's partner.

=== Kazuto Kotetsu ===
Voiced by: Akira Kanazawa

Also known as Avenge, he kills Ripper.

=== Soichiro Unomaru ===
Voiced by: Takahiro Sakurai

The creator of the T-system whom Sechs killed. He has the same power like Terumi and Hazama.

=== Ryoko Kagari ===
Toya's mother.

=== Ripper/Freaks ===
Voiced by: Kenichi Suzumura

Ripper is a serial killer with similar abilities of a Kaka though he does have a similar appearance of Hazama. He was killed by Avenge, the man hunting him down throughout the game. In Lost Memories, he became the villain.

=== Es-N ===
A group of artificial humans created by Sochiro to capture Toya. While most of them died, at least one survived and lives with Mei. Their appearance is similar to Nu 13.

=== Acht ===
Voiced by: Seiko Yoshida

A fallen member of the Ten Saints transformed into seithr.

=== Drei ===
Voiced by: Kentaro Tone

A fallen member of the Ten Saints under number three.

=== Sechs ===
Voiced by: Hiroyuki Kinoshita

A member for the Six of the Ten Saints and the half-brother of Kuon, whom Toya killed. He resembles Ragna and has the same power like him.

== See also ==
For playable crossover characters in BlazBlue: Cross Tag Battle:

- List of Persona 3 characters
- List of Persona 4 characters
- List of RWBY characters
- Akatsuki Blitzkampf#Characters
- Arcana Heart#Characters
- Under Night In-Birth#Characters
- Senran Kagura#Characters
