= Kowloon High-School Chronicle =

2004 video game

- Promotional art for the Nintendo Switch remaster of Kowloon High-School Chronicle
- Developers: Shout! Design Works; Toybox Inc. (remaster)
- Publishers: JP: Atlus (PS2); WW: Arc System Works; EU: PQube (Switch, PS4)
- Director: Shuuhou Imai
- Composer: Takashi Nitta
- Series: Related to Tokyo Majin Gakuen Denki
- Platforms: PlayStation 2; Nintendo Switch; PlayStation 4; Windows
- Release: PlayStation 2: JP: September 16, 2004; re:charge: JP: September 28, 2006; Nintendo Switch: JP: June 4, 2020; NA: February 4, 2021; PAL: May 21, 2021; PlayStation 4: JP/PAL: March 18, 2022; NA: March 26, 2022; Windows: WW: November 10, 2022
- Genres: Action role-playing, dungeon crawler, visual novel
- Mode: Single-player

Kowloon High-School Chronicle (Note: Japanese: 九龍妖魔學園紀, Hepburn: Kūron Yōma Gakuen-Ki; lit. "Kowloon Spirit Academy Chronicle". The kanji spelling of "Kowloon" means "nine dragons", referring to nine potential legendary treasures in the game's universe, and bears relation to the area in Hong Kong in name only.) is a 2004 video game developed by Shout! Design Works and published by Atlus for the PlayStation 2. Genre-wise it is a dungeon crawler action role-playing and visual novel hybrid. A remaster licensed by Sega was released by Arc System Works for the Nintendo Switch in 2020, followed by ports for the PlayStation 4 and Windows in 2022.

Modeled after films such as Indiana Jones and The Mummy, the game revolves around exploring an Ancient Egyptian ruin in search of treasure. The Egyptian aspects are contrasted with Japanese elements, such as myths from the Nihon Shoki. The protagonist also attends modern-day Japanese high school, gradually building relationships with his classmates. Being a role-playing game with social elements, and revolving around high school students fighting folkloric monsters, the game has been compared to modern entries in the Persona series – although Kowloon precedes said entries.

Series director Shuuhou Imai has a long history of making games in the category he calls gakuen juvenile denki (學園ジュヴナイル伝奇; lit. "young adult school fantasy"), starting with the Tokyo Majin Gakuen Denki series. Though Kowloon is inextricably linked to the series and even takes place in the same fictional universe, it is only the second related video game to be released in English, after Tokyo Twilight Ghost Hunters. Kowloon, along with other games under the gakuen juvenile denki moniker, is considered a cult classic in Japan, but has garnered comparatively little attention in the West.

== Plot ==
The player assumes the role of a young treasure hunter who has learned of the existence of an ancient, treasure-filled ruin underneath Kamiyoshi Academy in Shinjuku, Tokyo. Entering the school as a faux transfer student, his true goal is to explore these ruins and unearth the treasures (and OOPArts) they hold. This is not an uncomplicated task, however: the ruins reveal themselves to be an upside-down Ancient Egyptian pyramid, guarded by traps and age-old monsters of Japanese myth – and the school's student council, being more than it seems at first glance, is equally determined to get in the way.

The story is told as in an anime: divided up into "episodes", each one starts and ends with the same opening and ending sequences, and has separate sub-stories contained to each episode.

== Gameplay ==
A tennis ball is thrown at an enemy in the dungeon crawler mode. Unlike the environments, enemies are rendered as 2D sprites.

The game is divided into two primary modes: 3D dungeon crawler RPG segments, which consist of exploring the ruins underneath the school to retrieve treasure, and visual novel segments, which further the story and allow for interaction with the game's characters. Joining the two are various skeuomorphic menus – such as maps and Windows 95-styled computer screens – that allow moving around the school and accepting quests.

In the tradition of classic dungeon crawlers such as Wizardry, the RPG segments assume a tile-based first-person perspective. Actions are turn-based, with characters having a given number of action points to spend before the turn ends. Attacks are carried out as if it were an action game, allowing the player to aim and shoot with a cursor. Atypically for the time, the game features a crafting system, through which two items can be combined to synthesize a new one. Unlike traditional dungeon crawlers, dungeon segments also heavily feature puzzles, some of which require use of this crafting system.

Returning from the Tokyo Majin Gakuen Denki series is the Emotion Input System (Note: 感情入力システム, kanjō nyūryoku shisutemu) used in the visual novel segments, albeit with differing specifics. When speaking to characters, in addition to standard text options, a wheel-shaped interface will sporadically appear. This wheel is adorned with eight different emotions – two in each cardinal direction – selectable by pressing or holding the corresponding direction on the D-pad. There are nine possible responses: "joy", "love", "amity", "hot", "cold", "anger", "somber", "grief", and finally ignoring the other party (by pressing nothing). Depending on the selection, the player's relationship to the character may improve or worsen, and they may become a party member with unique stats and abilities for the dungeon segments.

Included as a bonus mode is Rockford Adventure, an original PC-98-styled retro dungeon crawler RPG. Progress in this game rewards the player with statistic bonuses in the main game.

== Editions ==
Beyond the 2004 original, two further versions of the game have been produced.

=== re:charge ===
On September 28, 2006 – two years after the original game – Atlus published an enhanced edition for the PlayStation 2, subtitled re:charge (Note: 再装填(re:charge), rīchāji; lit. "reloaded" (by the meaning of the kanji, as opposed to the furigana reading)). It features various improvements, such as a procedurally generated infinite dungeon inspired by Atlus's Wizardry: Tale of the Forsaken Land, extra scenarios, epilogues for each character as well as for the main story, and new quest clients. On April 24, 2008, a budget reissue was released under the "Atlus Best Collection" label.

=== Origin of adventure ===
In 2020 – 16 years after the original game's release – Arc System Works published a remaster of the game for Nintendo Switch (with a PlayStation 4 version announced), subtitled ORIGIN OF ADVENTURE in Japan. This edition was released the following year in English as simply Kowloon High-School Chronicle. It adapts only the original game, foregoing the content of re:charge. Though it primarily aims to recreate the original game as closely as possible, some improvements were made.

In addition to implementing widescreen in the dungeon segments as well as recreating or re-sampling assets for HD, difficulty options were added. The original game features only partial voice acting, but for this remaster, the original voice actors were brought back to implement optional full voice acting (excluding Miyu Matsuki, who had since died, and a small number of actors who were unavailable).

Beyond the digital edition released through the Nintendo eShop, this version also received a Japanese physical edition, as well as a limited edition entitled "Yomigaeru Hihō-Ban" (蘇える秘宝版; lit. "Restored Treasure Edition"). The limited edition features the game, a box, a figure of Kotaro Minakami (a character from the game), an art book, and a CD of a newly produced audio drama. Though only released digitally in North America, the European edition of the game received a physical edition published by PQube, along with a limited edition consisting of the game, a box, and two acrylic art standees.

== Development ==
=== Original ===
After the development of Tokyo Majin Gakuen: Gehōchō, director Shuuhou Imai wished to create a new "young adult school fantasy" series. Fearing that it might draw unfavorable comparisons from fans if it was too similar to his previous work, he aimed to differentiate the new game both in theme and in characters.

The treasure-hunting theme of the game was inspired by films such as Indiana Jones and The Mummy, as well as Hideyuki Kikuchi's novel series Treasure Hunter Yagashira Dai (Note: トレジャー・ハンター八頭大; lit. "Treasure Hunter Dai Yagashira") (which similarly stars a high schooler who secretly hunts treasure) and the manga Spriggan. Imai, being a fan of treasure hunter stories, chose the theme as he felt that it was rare in the medium of video games. The game's crafting system was inspired by the survival skills depicted in MacGyver and the manga Master Keaton.

Imai has attributed the choice of first-person 3D to two factors. For one, he felt that in order to depict a pyramid in a video game, 3D was the only option. In a later interview, he stated that he has always wished for the protagonist in his games to be a self-insert proxy for the player, but that the isometric perspective of his earlier work necessitated graphics and voice acting for the main character. The first-person perspective, then, was a way to at last make a true silent protagonist.

=== Remaster ===
The remaster for Nintendo Switch (later ported to other platforms) was proposed by Minoru Kidooka, executive producer at Arc System Works, who approached Imai with the idea. Imai had previously wanted to make a sequel, but the original game was initially met with poor sales, which precluded such a chance. However, he anticipated that if a remaster was successful, it may create the possibility for a sequel on modern platforms. The project initially targeted traditional home consoles, but development shifted to the Nintendo Switch upon the console's release.

Developed by Toybox Inc., the remaster is made from the ground up in the game engine Unity. The high-definition assets used are a mix of re-sampled originals obtained from the game's original publisher Atlus, and complete recreations. Due to the time- and labor-intensive recreation process, the content of re:charge was not included, with the producer stating that doing so would have doubled the development required.

== Reception ==
Reception

Aggregate score
Aggregator	Score
Metacritic	NS: 72/100

Review scores
Publication	Score
RPGamer	NS: 3.5/5
RPGFan	NS: 68/100
IGN Japan	NS: 8/10

Kowloon High-School Chronicle is considered a cult classic in Japan, with Nishikawa of Famitsu describing it as "a work that enjoys indefatigable popularity to this day" (Note: 「いまだに根強い人気を誇る作品」, "imada ni nezuyoi ninki wo hokoru sakuhin") – a sentiment echoed by Taijiro Yamanaka of Automaton Media. The Nintendo Switch remaster was nominated for "Best Adventure Game" in the 2020 Famitsu Dengeki Game Awards.

The game's dungeon segments have been largely well received. Makoto Kawachi of IGN Japan found the battle system to be balanced, and praised it for requiring trial and error in the strategy employed. Abraham Kobylanski of RPGFan similarly noted a "tactical feel" in the game's battles, finding the action point system to be interesting and a "nice challenge". Nagaame of Dengeki Online emphasized the dungeon segments' controls, saying that "It was outstandingly fun to assign weapons to buttons and fight as though it were an action game." (Note: 「ボタンに武器を割り振って、アクションゲーム的に戦えるのがすごく楽しかったです。」, "Botan ni buki wo warifutte, akushongēmu-teki ni tatakaeru no ga sugoku tanoshikatta desu.") Paul Shkreli of RPGamer, on the other hand, found the game to have "outdated mechanics" and "problematic balancing issues" – though submitted that it "generally works".

Of particular note is the Emotion Input System, which has been praised and criticized in similar measure. Joel Couture of Siliconera opined that it "makes conversations feel realistic", stating that "[i]n offering this system and presenting it in such a mysterious way, [it captures] that awkward feeling of starting at a new school". He also imparted, "It really felt like I was getting comfortable with new friends as they grew more comfortable with me." Kawachi found the system to augment role-playing, but lamented its obtuse nature and minimal impact on the story, while Shkreli described the interface as "difficult to decipher".

Shkreli characterized the game's writing as "over the top"; a "hypnotic mix of Egyptian occult, survival horror, and high school anime tropes". Kawachi considered the story "typical", (Note: 「王道」, "ōdō") but remarked that "eccentric character designs and voices make an immense impression, and as a result the characters are all unforgettable". (Note: 「奇抜なグラフィックや口調などはインパクト抜群で忘れられなくなるような人物ばかりだ」, "kibatsu na gurafikku ya kuchō nado wa inpakuto batsugun de wasurerarenakunaru yō na jinbutsu bakari da") Kobylanski, meanwhile, argued that the game's social elements are "uncomfortable" and that the game has a "gross vibe", owing to romantic overtones and characters perceived to be offensive – though also praised the story as "emotionally affecting". Multiple characters – the protagonist's classmate Kotaro Minakami especially – have found lasting popularity in fandom and doujin culture.

At launch, Kawachi criticized the Nintendo Switch remaster for having a "fatal abundance of bugs" (Note: 「致命的なバグの多さ」, "chimeiteki na bagu no ōsa") that break the game balance – though numerous patches have since been released, which IGN Japan considered to address the issues.

== Other media ==
Similar to other titles under the Tokyo Majin Gakuen Denki umbrella, Kowloon follows a media mix marketing strategy, and as such various tangential media has been produced.

=== Audio dramas ===
As is the case for many games in and related to the franchise, multiple audio dramas based upon the game have been produced. These audio dramas feature the game's voice actors acting out scenarios penned by Shuuhou Imai. The first – a detective drama – was released in two volumes on September 22, 2005, and October 21, 2005, respectively, and sees characters from the game work together to solve a set of mysteries at their school festival. The second was produced for the Japanese limited edition of the Nintendo Switch remaster, and explores the characters' lives after the end of the game, as well as recreating part of the epilogues exclusive to re:charge.

=== Soundtrack ===
Composed by Takashi Nitta (also the composer for the Tokyo Majin Gakuen Denki series), the game's soundtrack has received particular notice. In a review, Patrick Gann of RPGFan described it saying "sometimes it's funky, sometimes it's smooth, sometimes it's crazy atonal jazz, and other times it's 'espionage jazz' (you know, James Bond music)", and that "every track is a winner". The game's opening sequence, along with its music, has been perceived as an homage to the anime Cowboy Bebop and the music thereof.

The soundtrack was published across two releases on February 25, 2005 and December 22, 2006. The latter is subtitled "The Lost Third Disc", (Note: 失われた第三のディスク, Ushinawareta Dai San no Disuku) and contains full versions of the songs that play while exploring the ruins, as well as the soundtrack for Rockford Adventure.

=== Books ===
A screenplay was published in two volumes by Shinkigensha on November 1, 2004, and December 1, 2004. It contains most of the game's script including branching paths, and unusually doubles as a "choose your own adventure"-style gamebook, allowing the story to be "played" through on paper. On July 1, 2005, Koei published a making-of in the form of a book. In addition to detailing the game's development and interviewing development staff, it contains further worldbuilding not included in the game. Beyond these two, various art books, strategy guides, and manga anthologies have been produced by third parties.

=== Kowloon Machiuke H.A.N.T ===
Kowloon Machiuke H.A.N.T (Note: 九龍待受H.A.N.T; lit. "Kowloon Wallpaper H.A.N.T") is a mobile game that was once playable via Atlus's mobile website on Japanese feature phones. In it, the player may talk to two characters from the game each real-world day, and use a simplified version of the emotion input system to converse with them. Should the player choose correctly, they receive one of 75 different wallpaper images for use on their mobile phone.

=== Minakami-Yama no Nazo wo Oe!! ===
Released on June 29, 2007, Kowloon Yōma Gakuen-Ki Special DVD: [Rosetta Kyōkai] Kyokuhi File – Minakami-Yama no Nazo wo Oe!! (Note: 九龍妖魔學園紀SPECIAL DVD 《ロゼッタ協会》極秘ファイル皆神山の謎を追え!!; lit. "Kowloon High-School Chronicle Special DVD: [Rosetta Society] Top Secret File – Chase the Mystery of Mt. Minakami!!!") is an adventure DVD game in which the player heads to Mt. Minakami - a real mountain in Nagano Prefecture – in search of a character from the game who has gone missing. Using the DVD player remote to select options, a simplified version of the emotion input system is even implemented. Through this gameplay, the player may unlock video content such as interviews and making-of footage.

Mt. Minakami is known as a hotspot for supernatural happenings. According to Imai, the in-game character Kotaro Minakami was named after the mountain for this reason.
