= Yuki Masuda =

Japanese voice actress

- 増田 ゆき
- Born: Atami, Shizuoka, Japan
- Other name: Aiko Gotokuji (豪徳寺 愛子)
- Occupation: Voice actress
- Years active: 1995–present
- Agent: Mausu Promotion
- Children: 1

Yuki Masuda (増田 ゆき, Masuda Yuki) is a Japanese voice actress affiliated with Mausu Promotion. Her major roles include Yuri Sakakibara in Sakura Wars, Nami Amou and Nanami Sousuke in La Corda d'Oro, Nicola in Kyo Kara Maoh!, Maria Alucard in Tokyo Majin, and Hibiki Amawa (female) in I My Me! Strawberry Eggs.

== Filmography ==
=== Anime ===
List of voice performances in anime
Year	Title	Role	Notes	Source
1992	Crayon Shin-chan	Baby		
1994	Mahōjin Guru Guru	Gurieru, Iris		
1996	Those Who Hunt Elves	Mandragora Elf	Ep. 7	
1996	YAT Anshin! Uchū Ryokō	Monica Francoise	Ep. 2	
1996	You're Under Arrest	Police Woman B	Ep. 5; 1996–97 TV series	
1997	Kindaichi Case Files	Sayaka Kozu		
1997	Flame of Recca	Yanagi Sakoshita	Also 2nd ending theme song "Zutto Kimi no Soba de"	
1997	Those Who Hunt Elves II	Priest Elf, Salina	Ep. 1	
1997	Berserk	Erika		
1997–99	Agent Aika	Blue Delmo A		
1998	Trigun	Moore		
1998	Sakura Wars: The Gorgeous Blooming Cherry Blossoms	Yuri Sakakibara	OVA ep. 4 "A Midsummer Night's Dream"	
1998	Bubblegum Crisis Tokyo 2040	Misae		
1999	Cybuster	Kamijo Mizuki		
1999	Soul Hunter	Chuuou		
1999	Restol, The Special Rescue Squad	Jay		
1999	Weekly Story Land	Lady at the reception desk		
1999	Sakura Wars: The Radiant Gorgeous Blooming Cherry Blossoms	Yuri Sakakibara	OVA ep. 1 "The Dreadful Assassin from New York"	
2000	Mon Colle Knights	Merman of leader		
2000	Mighty Cat Masked Niyandar	Demonga		
2000	Saiyuki	Tomo		
2000	Sakura Wars	Yuri Sakakibara		
2000	Labyrinth of Flames	Aoinatsu	OVA	
2000	Sakura Wars: The Radiant Gorgeous Blooming Cherry Blossoms	Yuri Sakakibara	OVA ep. 5 and 6	
2000–01	Vandread series	Belvedere Coco		
2000	Inuyasha	Eri, others		
2001	I My Me! Strawberry Eggs	Hibiki Amawa (female)		
2001	PaRappa the Rapper	Wedding Rarin	Ep. 17	
2001	Cyborg 009: The Cyborg Soldier	Veena, Helen		
2002	Secret of Cerulean Sand	Bunch		
2002	Cosplay Complex	Sachiko Arii 有井幸子		
2002	G-On Riders	Sachiko Arii		
2002	Naruto	Sakura's mother		
2002	Shinseikiden Mars 神世紀伝マーズ	Harumi Yokoyama		
2002	Gold Muscle ja:ゴールドマッスル	Julia Jones		
2003	Stratos 4	Reika Honjo		
2003	Digi Girl Pop!	Nails		
2003	Beast Fighter: The Apocalypse ja:魔獣戦線	Aerodactyl プテラ		
2003	Lingerie Soldier Papillon Rose: Tsubomi no Yume wa Yoru Hiraku	Regina Apis	OVA	
2003	Uninhabited Planet Survive!	Shingo mother		
2003	Chrono Crusade	Sister Anna, Kevin		
2004	Maria-sama ga Miteru	Mifuyu Uzawa		
2004–08	Kyo Kara Maoh!	Nicola	3 seasons	
2004	The Marshmallow Times	Lady at the reception desk		
2004	Midori Days	Mom bookmark		
2004	Duel Masters Charge	Kirumi		
2004	Beet the Vandel Buster	Saki		
2004	Futakoi	Mother of Article		
2004	Gakuen Alice	Homeroom teacher		
2005	Gallery Fake	Welcomed guests		
2005	Emma	Kitchen maid		
2005	Zoids Genesis	Ming Famiron		
2005	Munto	Irita	OVA ep. 2	
2006	Papillon Rose: The New Season	Regina Abyss		
2006	Bakegyamon	Hull		
2006	Soul Link	Sayaka Nagase		
2006	Otogi-Jūshi Akazukin	Oedo Mariko		
2006	Night Head Genesis	KiriHara Naoya (child), γ (gamma), Tengen Yuko		
2006	La Corda d'Oro: Primo Passo	Nami Amou		
2007	Tokyo Majin	Maria Alucard		
2007	Naruto Shippuden	Yone		
2007	Sugarbunnies	Mint Usa, blueberry Usa, Pierre Jeunet, Sofia Mom		
2007	Toward the Terra	Suwena-Darlton, Contact Yae's, Tsueren		
2007	Mushi-Uta	Mayu		
2008	Mnemosyne	Hanna		
2008	Itazura na Kiss	Yuko Matsumoto		
2008	Duel Masters Cross	Kirumi		
2008	Hakken Taiken Daisuki! Shimajirō	Ma-kun		
2008	Uchi no Sanshimai	Refrigerator		
2008	Junjo Romantica series	Teacher	Also 2	
2008	Hell Girl: Three Vessels	Sumi Asaba		
2008	Shugo Chara!! Doki—	Rurumama		
2008	Ga-Rei Zero	Kana Itabashi		
2009	Kurokami The Animation	Mother of eyebrows		
2009	La Corda d'Oro: Secondo passo	Nami Amou	First movement and Second movement	
2009–13	Hetalia: Axis Powers series	Ukraine	Starting with Phase 2	
2009	Inuyasha: The Final Act	Eri, others		
2011	Cardfight!! Vanguard	Misaki's mother		
2011	Manyū Hiken-chō	Contact Mitsuru		
2014	La Corda d'Oro Blue Sky	Nanami Sousuke		
2015	Rolling Girls	Moritomo Hinata fee		
2015	Dōshitemo eto ni hairitai ja:どうしても干支にはいりたい	Boar		

=== Film ===
List of voice performances in feature films
Year	Title	Role	Notes	Source
1997	Ultra Nyan: Mysterious cat descended from Ultra Nyan starry sky ウルトラニャン 星空から舞い降りたふしぎネコ	Snow		
1997	Spur Chiharu Igaya story to glory 栄光へのシュプール 猪谷千春物語	Inotani Chinatsu		
1998	Ultra Nyan 2: Happy Daisakusen ウルトラニャン2 ハッピー大作戦	Snow		
1999	ja:ハッピーバースデー 命かがやく瞬間	Megumi Hanamura		
2001	Sakura Wars: The Movie	Yuri Sakakibara		
2002	Inuyasha the Movie: The Castle Beyond the Looking Glass	Eri		
2004	Inuyasha the Movie: Fire on the Mystic Island	Moegi		

=== Video games ===
List of voice performances in video games
Year	Title	Role	Notes	Source
1996–2003	Sakura Wars series	Yuri Sakakibara		
1998	Xenogears	operator	PS1/PS2	
1998–2004	Tokyo Majin Gakuen series	Maria Alucard, Kikyo, Orin	Kenpūchō, Oboro-Kitan, Gehōchō, Gehōchō: Keppūroku	
1999	Boys Be... 2nd Season	Kitaooji Jennifer Doheny	PS1/PS2	
1999	Maboroshi Tsukiyo	Tsumugi Oshima	DC	
1999–2000	Tokimeki Memorial 2 series	Takumi Sakaki	PS1/PS2; Also Substories,	
1999	Yukyu Gensoukyoku 3 Perpetual Blue	Routing Wyeth	DC	
2000	Yuukyuu Kumikyoku Perpetual Suite All Star Project	Routing Wyeth	PS1/PS2	
2000	Happy Salvage	Nanami Marina	PS1/PS2	
2001	You're Under Arrest!	Cheryl	PS1/PS2	
2003–16	La Corda d'Oro series	Nami Amou, Nanami Sousuke		
2003	Ratchet & Clank 2	Angela		
2004	Flame of Recca Final Burning	Sako Shimoyanagi	PS1/PS2	
2004	Sentimental Prelude	Misao Ayasaki	PS1/PS2	
2004	Soul Link	Sayaka Nagase	PC Adult; Also Extension in 2006, Ultimate in 2010; As Aiko Gotokuji for Ultimate	
2005	God of War	Artemis, Priest	PS1/PS2	
2006	Everybody's Tennis	Miranda	PS1/PS2	
2012	Dragon Age II	Isabella		
2012	Fire Emblem Awakening	Licht, Velvet	DS	
	Di Gi Charat Fantasy	Luna	Also Fantasy Excellent	
	Zenkoku Seifuku Bishoujo Grand Prix -Find Love		Sega Saturn	
	Ren'ai Kouhosei	Aya	Windows	
	Shine	Hina Maeda		
	Let's Make a Professional Baseball Team ja:プロ野球チームをつくろう!	Ms. Warbler ウグイス嬢		

=== Drama CD ===
List of voice performances in drama CDs
Title	Role	Notes	Source
Seiryo most fear story	Ren Ayanokoji		
Gentlemen Alliance †	Otsumiyamidoriko		
Soul Link Drama Album	Nagase SunaKei		
Sakura Wars	Yuri Sakakibara		
Twilight Syndrome			
Yuukyuu Gensoukyoku 3 Perpetual Blue			
Anime Manager ja:アニメ店長	Jun Namihen 並辺ジュン		
How to kill a friendly dragon ja:やさしい竜の殺し方	Claudia クローディア		
My Funny Valentine Tirol マイファニーバレンタインチロル	Tirol チロル		

=== Dubbing ===
List of voice performances in dubbing
Title	Role	Notes	Source
Robots	Piper		
Road to Avonlea	Cecily		
The Trials of Rosie O'Neill	Kim		
Growing Pains	Clichy		
The Adventures of Swiss Family Robinson	Christina		
Popular Mechanics for Kids	Vanessa		
Alice's Adventures in Wonderland	Alice		
A Nightmare On Elm Street	Nancy		
War Stories	Nora	2003 film	
Psycho Beach Party	Florence		
ja:SF起源 タイムゲイト	Jane		
A Better Tomorrow	Jackie		
A Better Tomorrow 2	Jackie		
The Adventures of Tom Sawyer	Becky		
Chinese Heroes 中華英雄伝	Jupiter		
Stolen Summer	Danny		
Crocodile Dundee in Los Angeles	Mikey		
Jane Eyre	Ade - Le		
Kids Mission キッズミッション	Jonas		
The Big Boss	Xu Hong		
Dallas	Jamie		
The Patriot	Holly		
Shaolin Family Soccer 少林サッカー外伝	Paggou		

- Babs Seed in My Little Pony: Friendship Is Magic
- Dulcy the Dragon (also by Mayuko Aoki) in Sonic the Hedgehog

== Anime soundtracks ==
- Flame of Recca Ending 2 ("Zutto Kimi no Soba de")
