= Akimitsu Takase =

Japanese voice actor (born 1970)

- 高瀬 右光
- Born: September 1, 1970 (age 56); Chiba Prefecture, Japan
- Occupation: Voice actor
- Years active: 1990–present
- Agent: Aksent

Akimitsu Takase (高瀬 右光, Takase Akimitsu; born September 1, 1970) is a Japanese voice actor. He graduated from the Tokyo Seiyū Academy and Ezaki Productions Training School (currently Mausu Promotion Actors' School).

== Filmography ==
=== Anime series ===
- Nintama Rantarou (2001)
- Astro Boy (2003) – Delta
- Zipang (2004) – Gunichi Mikawa
- Attack on Titan (2013) – Darius Baer Varbrun

Unknown date

- Beelzebub (????) – Reiji Kiriya
- Ceres, Celestial Legend (????) – Tomonori Aogiri
- Daphne in the Brilliant Blue (????) – Thomas
- E's Otherwise (????) – Eiji Sagimiya
- Fafner of the Azure (????) – Haruko Kodate
- Fresh Pretty Cure! (????) – Keitarō Momozono
- Fullmetal Alchemist (????) – Cray
- Gallery Fake (????) – Kuraun
- Heat Guy J (????) – Joe Sayama
- Hikaru no Go (????) – Tatsuhiko Kadowaki
- Initial D Fourth Stage (????) – Smiley Sakai
- Lazarus (????) – Boat Owner
- Major (????) – Inui
- Naruto (????) – Kaiza, Akaboshi
- Super GALS! Kotobuki Ran (????) – Tsukasa Mitani, Kazuki Katase
- Shaman King (????) – Marco Lasso
- Shinshaku Sengoku Eiyū Densetsu – Sanada Jū Yūshi (????) – Sanada Nobuyuki
- Uninhabited Planet Survive! (????) – Bell
- Viewtiful Joe (????) – Hulk Davidson
- Wangan Midnight (????) – Takayuki Kuroki

=== Original video animation ===
- Sonic the Hedgehog (????) – Secretary

=== Anime films ===
- Crayon Shin-chan: Honeymoon Hurricane ~The Lost Hiroshi~ (????) – Riders
- Twittering Birds Never Fly – The Clouds Gather (????) – Kazuaki Hirata
- Sekiro: No Defeat (2026) – Hanbei

=== Video games ===
- Ace Combat 7: Skies Unknown - High Roller
- Advance Guardian Heroes - Sky Knight, Demon
- Initial D Extreme Stage - Smiley Sakai
- Fu-un Bakumatsu-den (????) – Yamagata Aritomo
- Koukidou Gensou Gunparade March (????) – Keigo Tosaka
- Kowloon Youma Gakuen Ki
- Max Payne (????) – Police Officer
- Monster Hunter: World - Huntsman
- Romance: The Brilliance of the Japanese Sword II (????) – Albion, Phalanx, Gorba
- Shaman King: Funbari Spirits (????) – Marco
- Shaman King: Soul Fight (????) – Marco
- Shaman King: Spirit of Shamans (????) – Marco
- Tenchu: Stealth Assassins (????) – Goo
- Tokyo Majin Gakuen Gehōchō: Keppūroku
- Tokyo Majin Gakuen: Kenpūchō
- Valkyrie Profile: Lenneth (????) – Suo
- Viewtiful Joe: Red Hot Rumble (????) – Hulk Davidson
- Yoshitsuneki (????) – Taira no Noritsune

=== Tokusatsu ===
- Tokusou Sentai Dekaranger (????) – Handorean Decho

=== Drama CDs ===
- Subete wa Kono Yoru ni (????) – Yasuyuki Takei

=== Radio Drama ===
- Final Fantasy Tactics Advance (????) – Judge, Cid's Coworker

=== Dubbing ===
- The 5th Wave – Oliver Sullivan (Ron Livingston)
- Divergent – Eric Coulter (Jai Courtney)
- The Divergent Series: Insurgent – Eric Coulter (Jai Courtney)
- Garden State – Mark (Peter Sarsgaard)
- Gotham – Alfred Pennyworth (Sean Pertwee)
- Guardians of the Galaxy – Watchtower Guard (Enzo Cilenti)
- Hail, Caesar! – Eddie Mannix (Josh Brolin)
- The Hitchhiker's Guide to the Galaxy – Ford Prefect (Mos Def)
- Infamous Second Son – Hank (David Stanbra)
- Jack Ryan: Shadow Recruit – Viktor Cherevin (Kenneth Branagh)
- Jeepers Creepers 2 – Scotty Braddock (Eric Nenninger)
- Lonely Hearts – Detective Reilly (Scott Caan)
- The Man from Nowhere – Man-seok (Kim Hee-won)
- Rise of the Planet of the Apes – Rodney (Jamie Harris)
- The Stand – Glen Bateman (Greg Kinnear)
- Street Kings – Coates (Common)
- Tactical Force – Demetrius (Michael Shanks)
- The Undeclared War – Andrew Makinde (Adrian Lester)
- X-Men: Evolution – Mesmero, Blob
