= Tokyo Majin Gakuen: Fuju Hōroku =

2000 video game

- Game Boy Advance cover art
- Developer: Shout! Design Works
- Publishers: Asmik Ace; Marvelous Entertainment (GBA)
- Series: Tokyo Majin Gakuen
- Platforms: WonderSwan, Game Boy Advance
- Release: WonderSwan: JP: October 12, 2000; Game Boy Advance: JP: April 1, 2004
- Genres: Visual Novel; Digital collectible card game
- Modes: Single-player, multiplayer

Tokyo Majin Gakuen: Fuju Hōroku (東京魔人學園符咒封録, Tōkyō Majin Gakuen Fuju Hōroku; lit. "Tokyo Wizard Academy: Sealed Spell Chronicle") is the second video game (excluding the fan disc for the first game) in the Tokyo Majin Gakuen franchise, and an entry in said franchise's Hito no Shō (人の章, lit. "Mankind Chapter") setting. It was originally released on October 12, 2000, on the WonderSwan, and later ported to Game Boy Advance. Like most entries in the franchise, it has never been released outside Japan.

== Gameplay ==
The player become a god who does battle using unique cards, of which 500 various types are available. The cards can be combined for greater powers and can be earned by connecting with other players and doing battle via link-up cable. The game's story covers thirteen chapters set in the unique Tokyo Majin Gakuen world. The story progresses through interactive conversation sequences, where the player's choices affect their path and the cards that they gain. The GBA version includes new characters and all-new cards, new rules and modes.
