= Tokyo Majin Gakuen Gehōchō: Keppūroku =

2004 video game

- Game cover
- Developer: Marvelous Entertainment
- Publisher: Marvelous Entertainment
- Series: Tokyo Majin Gakuen
- Platform: PlayStation 2
- Release: JP: August 12, 2004
- Genre: Role-playing video game
- Mode: Single-player

Tokyo Majin Gakuen Gehōchō: Keppūroku (東京魔人學園外法帖血風録), is a video game upgrade of Tokyo Majin Gakuen Gehōchō (東京魔人學園外法帖) (2002) re-released for the PlayStation 2 platform in 2004. The remake released with a companion book on Norse Mythology and character information.

The game is based on the Tokyo Majin Gakuen franchise. Like all of the other video games in the series, it was never released outside Japan.

== Gameplay ==
Players can join either the forces of Light or the forces of Shadow. Once the game is completed, players can unlock a third group to align themselves with. Beside participating in conflicts among various Japanese political and demonic organizations, you also come into contact with the gods from Nordic mythology, including Odin, Freia, Loki who are concerned about events in the Far East.

As with the tradition of Tokyo Majin games, this is an adventure/strategy RPG hybrid. In adventure mode, players interacts with characters for answers. Affecting the answers and overall story progression are nine "emotions": love, friendship, joy, agreement, sorrow, anger, indecision, scorn, and ignorance. In battle mode, the party fights on isometric battle screens, moving around the battlefield and attacking when enemies are in range.

== Plot ==
In the Bakumatsu era in 1860s feudal Japan, the dynasty of Tokugawa shōguns are continuously attacked by rebel groups that wish to end the shōguns and restore the Empire. Young people all over Japan united into different clans and organizations, wishing to conquer the power in the capital city Edo. At this time, divine and demonic creatures also started gaining power under the leadership of Tenkai Kodzunu. The hero is Tatsuto Hiyuu, an ancestor of Tatsuma Hiyuu, the main hero of earlier Tokyo Majin games. This also applies to all the other characters in the game as they are ancestors of the respective characters in the Keppūroku game.

== Characters ==
=== Hero ===
- 'HiIsamu Ryuto' (Hiyuu Tatsuto) (voice: Yasuyuki Kase)
  As led towards Edo to the fate of the mystery youth. Ancestor of the hero and HiIsamu Ryuasa of Kenfujo. The name is the default ones, can be changed. Others, birthday, four major, hometown freely can be set, whereby the initial compatibility with the performance and the character of the unit is changed. However, gender can not be changed are fixed in men is the same as the Kenfujo. Cultivate the ancient martial art of yang of empty-handed. Yadoboshi is "Huanglong". He is the first of the "yellow dragon bowl" has been historically recognized.

=== Dragon Flash group ===
- 'Ai Misato' (Aoi Misato) (voice: Yui Horie)
  September 20 was born. Kenfujo Character Aoi Misato ancestors. In kind-hearted girl who aspire to the way of the doctor, it is also the hidden Christians. The secret is hidden there in the birth. Like the offspring, in addition to use the "power" of healing, also it will have a high combat capability of using the angel of the force to grow to a high level. Yadoboshi is "Bodhisattva eye (Bodhisattva cancer)".
- 'Horaitera KyoWu' (Horai same Kyogo) (voice: Kawanabe Masaki)
  January 24, was born. Kenfujo Character Horaitera Kyoichi of those connected to the family. Not a direct ancestor, but descendants of the sister of Kyowu are to be Kyoichi, relationships with the special circumstances that Kyoichi is strong. Also in the swordsman of Burai, which wants the Kiwamen the way of the sword and Kyoichi, its qualities while self-taught is that of excellence. Although lazy a luck-pusher is usually in the heart chivalry cordial. I love the buckwheat. Yadoboshi is "Giboshi".
- 'Daigo Okei' (Daigo tangible) (voice: Takayuki Ishiguro)
  April 23, was born. An ancestor of Kenfujo Character Daigo parent, timer monk of Koyasan. Unlike the offspring I was a little nervous, a corrupt priest of exciting personality. Serious part is the same as the descendants, where wants to sag soon preaching the existence smoky for the Kyowu. Make full use of the advantage of the bulk fighting surgery and dense Oxley surgery. Yadoboshi is "tiger", the body's ability is further improved by awakening (called Hensei (Henjo)).
- 'Sakurai Shosuzu' (Sakurai Kosuzu) (voice: Yuu Asakawa)
  March 20, was born. Kenfujo Character Sakurai small Dill ancestors. In only daughter of archery dojo, like virtuoso of the bow and descendants. First person is me. It is a bright and active, but is often Buddhist prayer to Oribe shrine as "I want you to become a little more your graceful" from the parent. Where is the best friend of indigo is also the same as descendants. Yadoboshi is "Ti Star".

More than 4 people is not involved in the story progression, it has been fixed as the ally character of "yang" hen "evil" Hen.

Subsequent characters may may not result in companion by actions of the player.

- 'Ryokairi' (ink stone) (voice: EiSako Mai)
  September 1, was born. Kenfujo Character Kisaragi jade ancestors and is possible girl; does not also been unified opinion between the production staff in this regard, and the view that asserts that she is an ancestor of jade, Chennai dry is of the view that there is also a possibility of an ancestor is her brother both theory is presented at the same time. He served as a public affairs covert in the Shinobi of the sect called Fei water flow, manipulate the water with the "power". Was the poor reticent women to the movement of the emotion, we regained human feelings little by little in the encounter with the dragon Flash group. Although run by the antique stores along with his brother usually, the goods of the connoisseur is poor. Yadoboshi is "Xuanwu".
- 'Universe party' (the firmament Tou)
  This is a gentleman thief Kamen aimed at social reform, ancestors of Kenfujo character Cosmo Ranger. It is composed of three Benikage-black shadow-Momokage.

'Takeryu' (Ken Voice: Makoto Aoki) was born January 1, an ancestor of Benii Takeshi. But weak fireworks of care is usually, but changed to a strong personality that to disguise the Benikage.

'Jurota' (Jurota-Voice: Eiji Sekiguchi) was born February 2, an ancestor of Hayato Kurosaki. Impatient personality courier of usually Western rash. He is not the same as usual even if disguised as a black shadow.

'Kanon' (Canon Voice: Fumino Imaizumi) March 3 born in the ancestor of Momoka Hongo. It usually but apprenticed daughter of the countryside smell shy to teahouse, with a "force" that can communicate the intention with the plant. Accent is eliminated by disguise to Momokage, it changes to sophisticated impression. Each Yadoboshi • The Isamuhoshi-Joboshi-Chee Sing.

- 'Mana' (voice: Miyu Matsuki)
  September 14, was born. Character no kinship ties with other work. In Muschg people, girl it is the world too by stealing. Not only it is agile like a beast, with a "force" that can communicate with animals and intention. They are pouring a deep affection for the sickly sister, Mayu (Mayu). Most acquainted was Muschg who is born in the Kansai region, it speaks in Kansai dialect. Yadoboshi is unknown.
- 'Kasumi Umetsuki' (Kasumi Baigetsu) (voice: Akira Ishida)
  November 2, was born. Kenfujo Character Akizuki Masaki ancestor. His real name is Makoto Akizuki. Dawdle along with a haiku poet of, Takeru also to scry to predict the future lover. I had a momentary, hedonistic way of life in order to escape from the pressure of fate, but will reform the idea in the encounter with the dragon Flash group and Mana. By Kotodama it is possible to put the "power" to the haiku. Yadoboshi is "star view".
- 'Subtle' (voice: EiSako Mai)
  January 26, was born. Kenfujo Character Mairi-Claire ancestors. Or the United States ancestors of Mairi is why Japanese is a person of Her is found in the ending. Pious in the secret Christian, honest girl with a straightforward straight mind. Descendants and also manipulate the flame has the "power", Yadoboshi is "Suzaku".
- 'Oribe KuzuNǎi' (Katsuno Oribe) (voice: Makoto Tsumura)
  February 10, was born. An ancestor of Kenfujo Character Oribe sister, also Oribe priestess of the shrine. And Yukino descendants more powerful is the Mob skin of women, such as those in the dynamic. Fighting style is a combination of halberd and spiritual power. Yadoboshi is "Kusanagi".
- 'Chinook sprinkle door ' (Sid twill) (voice: Tomohiro Tsuboi)
  September 30, was born. Although kinship ties are not with other work, the presence that have some sort of association appeared to sword-like pledge. Weirdo's but with an ingenious contraption nurse, is also the person the universe party was organized by the special clothing and masks that you own manufacture. Instantly to understand its structure in any complex tool equipped with a "power" of the "Senju". Man concealed an important role in this work. Yadoboshi is "Ji".
- 'Hinokishin Mifuyu' (HinoKami Mifuyu) (voice: Nao Takamori)
  October 10, was born. Ancestor of Ssangyong strange Character cypress God Kagura. In only daughter of swordsmanship dojo "Garyukan", beauty wearing a kimono of men's things. The arm is something for sure, but there was a mentally fragile one side. However, we continue to overcome the weakness of the inner surface thereof through the encounter with the dragon Flash group and demon road crowd. It is also a strong psychic constitution. Modeling model of Shōtarō Ikenami "Kenkaku" business Sasaki Sanfuyu. Yadoboshi is "Shinboshi".
- 'Piseru' (voice: Nao Takamori)
  Exotic spirit that had descended from one situation to the body of the Mifuyu. Once in the presence, which has been referred to as the Orleans maiden, as originally, but he pronounced "Pucelle", it will be differences hear Kyowu is a "Piseru", is as it is called. Although they share the body and Mifuyu, hair when the consciousness of Piseru is out in the table is changed to gold. In the game, you can be a friend becomes a Mifuyu or Piseru either of the two taku.
- 'Liu' (dragon) (voice: Akira Taisuke)
  March 25, was born. Ancestor of Kenfujo Character Liu crescent. In a mission we came to Japan tinged with Qing of Hakka born boy Sendo mechanic, wizardry and martial arts consumer of. It is of small monkey Warabe Mediums the (Tanki) to buddy. Yadoboshi is "Reiboshi".

=== Demon road crowd ===
- 'Nine corners Ten Ring (Kozunu heaven) (voice: Yasuyuki Kase)
  March 14, was born. Kenfujo Character nine corners ancestor of Tendo. In crimson Sohatsu impressive dignified young samurai, big personality's bosom in the chieftain of the demon road crowd. Has received overwhelming adoration from men, Ten Ring also has given a deep understanding and trust with respect to each and every subordinate. Use the demon road and outside method, sharpen the fangs of vengeance against the shogunate, which destroyed the former own clan. Relationship that has been hidden there between the Ai Misato. Yadoboshi is unknown.
- 'Bellflower' (bellflower) (voice: Yuki Masuda)
  February 9, was born. Ancestor of Ssangyong strange character Nachi ShizuRumi. In beauty oozes bewitching atmosphere, are serving on its side swear deep allegiance to heaven precepts. Yin and Yang road and but with outstanding knowledge and skills outside method, this is due to its identity and her surprising feature. Yadoboshi is unknown.
- 'Kyukiri Naokumo' (Kudo fortune of business) (voice: Eiji Sekiguchi)
  October 25, was born. Ssangyong strange Character nine Kiri Izumo ancestors in a corrupt priest. In addition there is also a master of sōjutsu called Ryuzo Institute flow, this school is also intended to learn and Kenfujo Character Amemon thunder people. It is a cousin of Ten Ring, the loyal confidant. Free and vigorous nature in, prefer to fight against the strong. In the game, it has a special ability to remember stealing the tricks of the opponent. Yadoboshi is unknown.
- 'Kazamatsuri Aoji' (Okitsugu Kazamatsuri) (voice: Fumino Imaizumi)
  April 29, was born. Ssangyong change of hero and Kazamatsuri RyuWataru-RyuOsamu ancestor of brothers. In addition, they mastered the art of shadow of the dragon to become a martial arts and a pair cultivate a hero, which is also the school is posterity of sword-like pledge Character Mibu autumn leaves were wearing. In both most of the children's real age and mental age is in the demon road crowd, it is a strong unyielding boy of the bridge of nose. Competition awareness hero Unusual martial arts of alumni is strong, but coming rival to put in something, in a while a game is in progress is also the strange relationship that goes up his favorability more you or fling or kicking the Kazamatsuri. Yadoboshi is unknown.

More than 4 people is not involved in the story progression, it has been fixed as the ally character of "shadow" hen "evil" Hen.

Subsequent characters may may not result in companion by actions of the player.

- 'Gokamitsuchi' (MiKazuchi) (voice: Akira Ishida)
  March 18, was born. Although kinship ties are not with other work, the sword-like presence that appeared to have pledge some sort of association. It has been subject to oppression massacre in the survival of hidden Christians us, to anguish to Hazama of the faith and revenge missionary. As well as a consumer of the spear, with the "power" to manipulate lightning. Yadoboshi is unknown.
- 'Maitreya Mantoki' (Miroku Bansai) (voice: small above Hiromichi)
  February 3, was born. In character there is no kinship ties with other work, reticent man of the craftsman. Once in a domineering samurai surface striking nurses of the one-armed, which was cut off the right arm, dwells is curse basis "force" on the surface his carve. Yadoboshi is unknown.
  It is a character only, is the sublimation of tricks not in all character.
- 'Chennai dry' (flow) (voice: Eiji Sekiguchi)
  July 2, was born. Kenfujo Character Kisaragi man that might be an ancestor of jade (see the section of Ryokairi). It was once excellent public affairs covert, but became a Shinobu missing breaking the pilfering of the law to protect the cool nautical miles Jitsumai. In addition to having the "power" to manipulate the water, Nagajiru also in such disguise surgery. Usually runs a curio shop in Kita-ku, Tokyo also has excellent connoisseur of goods different from the sister. Yadoboshi is "Xuanwu".
- 'Mibu Shimoha' (Mibu is so) (voice: Yasuyuki Kase)
  December 4, was born. Kenfujo Character Mibu ancestor of the Autumn leaves. Once belonged to Shinsengumi, but was a man that had been touted a sword name among them, disappointed with the deterioration the first time of the Shinsengumi, exit the station. Demon Blade - but use the Muramasa, is to be need to without being a curse for the constitution, which does not emit animation called "no-soul disease". Yadoboshi is "Dog Star (Tenro surname)".
- 'Were days round' (Montenmaru) (voice: Toshitaka Shimizu)
  December 15, was born. Mt. of braggart to be brought up, it is possible to use the Horiki, youth of luck-pusher in womanizing. There is no kinship ties with other work. In the episode that Kenfujo characters who go to Kyoto in a school trip, Tengu legend has been told. Yadoboshi is "Tamonten".
- 'Hail' (leopard) (voice: Makoto Tsumura)
  July 22, was born. Although kinship ties are not with other work, the presence that have some sort of association appeared to sword-like pledge. Kigurai is high, in the beauty of the frosty atmosphere that do not allow the mind to others, in addition to having the "power" to manipulate the water, manipulate like creature the doll. But to move always in the bosom of a huge wind-up doll-Ganryuu, this is, once well as destroy their own clan to shogunate, it is to have a past that her own was also deprived of the freedom of walking. Yadoboshi is unknown.
- 'Tai' (Tai Shan) (voice: Akimitsu Takase)
  September 1, was born. Although kinship ties are not with other work, the presence that have some sort of association appeared to sword-like pledge. It giant with Herculean strength, but its Kokorone gently calm, animals and good terms. The past, had been living as a woodcutter, has lived received a wound to the head by the will and the shogunate officials to monopolize the found gold mine in is not the mountain, it has lost a part of the thinking. Yadoboshi is unknown.
- 'HiYap' (flame) (voice: Kentaro Ito)
  January 3, was born. Although kinship ties are not with other work, the presence that have some sort of association appeared to sword-like pledge. Thick man in-law humanity of what is wild and warlike. Was once the clan patriot, but lost both arms by change of Quemoy. His arm became prosthetic hand is now, Arashio has been armed with a contraption for blowing out the sharp claws and developed flame. Yadoboshi is unknown.
- 'Chris' (voice: Makoto Aoki)
  October 7, was born. Ancestor of Kenfujo Character Alan brewers. It is a simple and serious personality compared to the womanizing descendants. Wounded by the battle with nemesis Jeff was murdered sister, I came to Japan and picked up the place fell into the sea in Japan steamer. In the faint, there is a section looking at the remnants of the deceased sister. It is a virtuoso of the shooting, with the "power" to manipulate the wind. Yadoboshi is "Blue Dragon".
- 'Hira slope' (Hirasaka) (voice: Kozue Yoshizumi)
  September 7, was born. Kenfujo Character Hira slope ancestor of Shayoru. Trapped in the spectacle hut Mermaid ephemeral down beautiful girl blonde blind, which has been allowed to dress up in. As well as the offspring, it is possible to put the "power" frightful enough unparalleled in a beautiful singing voice. It is a key person for a serious and critical involvement in a unique narrative structure of outside Fengcheng, there she is what lead the fate of the hero. Its identity was revealed with blood wind proceedings were exactly what pressure the other. Yadoboshi is unknown.
- 'Arashio' (egg yolk) (voice: Tomohiro Tsuboi)
  September 30, was born. Although kinship ties are not with other work, the presence that have some sort of association appeared to sword-like pledge. For generations born into a family that serve nine corner house, "Arashio" is a name to succeed is the family head. It usually hides the real face to the birds face, engaged in operations planning and weapons development as the brain of the demon road crowd. Man concealed an important role in this work. Yadoboshi is unknown.

=== Other ===
- 'When Yuri Susa' (Tokizusa lily) (voice: Kaho Kōda)
  July 8, was born. It established bases in Longquan Temple, in the beauty to direct the dragon flash group as a public affairs covert, with the "force" of see the mind hole blown out of Ryumyaku "Tathagata eye (Tathagata cancer)". Magami school's founder. Although it is not that the descendants appear to directly sword-style pledge, on setting the school principal Magami in the era of Kenfujo it has become a person named "time Susa Makie". It does not participate in the battle.
- 'Enku' (Enku) (voice: Toshiaki Kuwahara)
  In Iemochi Tokugawa of is also a consultant Koyasan of Acharya, teacher of male Kei. He also was instructed dragon flash group founded in lilies. We are watching the dragon Flash group from behind and dressed as Kokoya usually living in row houses.
- 'Tono Anzuhana' (Kyoka Tono) (voice: Yukari Tamura)
  February 27, was born. In Kenfujo Character Kyoko Tono Kawaraban shop ancestors, Yakumawari to provide the same information to the heroes and descendants. Although there are a brother named holly (holly), play an important role in his some other works.
- 'Mikuriya Soshu' (Mikuriya so week) (voice: Toshiaki Kuwahara)
  July 8, was born. Tsukibeniden Character Mikuriya criminal, and an ancestor of Demons are Requiem Character Mikuriya Reinanji criminal, also protect the security of the city and the descendants arson thief breaks of concentric. Sense of justice is a regular guy of strong and decisive personality. It has been referred to as the "boss" is from Yosuke. Or lived in Hatchobori, or have been involved in the investigation of the Yoshiwara of murder, such as capture the corruption officials of the magistrate offices, the historical fact seems somewhat different set of Shokubun.
- 'Yosuke' (Yosuke) (voice: Akira Ishida)
  Subordinates of Mikuriya Oka. Luck-pusher that there is something a little a clunker.
- 'Your Lin' (Orin) (voice: Yuki Masuda)
  Popular Yoshihara of courtesan, the good elder sister beauty of the skin of the ethos. Heroes to convey the information.
- 'SakakiShigeru TamotsuEmon' (Sakaki Mohoemon) (voice: Tomohiro Tsuboi)
  In arson thief breaks the boss of Mikuriya feudal era police rank. While hunting a young man during the patrol in the gay-ish character, in fact, it is a strong officials sense of justice in the men think. In "Chifuroku", not recorded voice.
- 'Miya' (Miya) (voice: Junko Okada)
  Takeryu is working only daughter of Hanabiya "Bentendo". In unyielding personality, to pep talk the unreliable Takeryu.
- 'Mayu' (cocoon) (Voice: Junko Okada)
  True Nasu sister. Weak born body, helped the place that had a seizure in indigo. Polite opposite personality and sister, speaking in the standard language.
- 'Dog God Morzine' (Inugami Morito) (voice: Tomohiro Tsuboi)
  October 9, was born. Ronin living in the same tenement and Anzuhana. I hate large of human beings, extremely refuse to be involved with others. When Lily and the Susa seems terms of old friends.
- 'Father of the spectacle hut' (voice: Kawanabe Masaki)
  The Hira slope to the naked, man to spectacle as a mermaid. I did not learn by experience even if it receives the punishment of strike with the back of one's sword from KyoWu and Ten Ring, but Hira slope of force would have been done in the miasma of Hades that erupted when a runaway. Also appeared in the shadow knitting first Ichi story.
- 'Your leaf' (urination) (voice: Kaho Kōda)
  Yoshiwara courtesan. There was acquainted with bellflower, die and aggravated the tuberculosis.
- 'Rintaro Katsu' (and Rintaro) (voice: Akimitsu Takase)
  Captain of Kanrin Maru. It is in the works claiming to wind people Hitoshi (sound of heavy breathing again).
- 'Katamori Matsudaira' (Katamori Matsudaira) (voice: Toshitaka Shimizu)
  Shogunate of Kyoto Shugoshoku. We try to Uchitoro dragon flash group as an organization to promote the shogunate overthrow. In fact, had been obsessed black flies Weng.
- 'Iemochi Tokugawa' (Iemochi Tokugawa) (voice: Makoto Aoki)
  Edo shogunate 14th shōgun. Take is to appear in the Enku in order to stop the runaway of Katamori. Then he died.

=== Enemy characters ===
- 'Yagyu SoTakashi' (Munetaka Yagyu) (voice: Shōto Kashii)
  July 25, was born. Like the nine square heaven precepts, it has a crimson hair fiery, and dressed in the same color of the brawny armor, man of mystery to drop an eerie shadow on the back of various incidents.
- 'Hyakki Demon Church' (Yodo Nakiri) (voice: Akimitsu Takase)
  Yagyu subordinates. A Noroikinshi, eyes hidden in bandages, depicts the eyes only one on it. Profusely high-pitched laughter. The crushing defeat to the heroes, are executed in the dragonfly.
- 'Dragonfly' (heat haze) (voice: Kaho Kōda)
  Yagyu subordinates. Woman systemic bandage appearance. In consumer of Insect poison, also it has a toxic to the body. Torn heroes, died by their own corruption after the shot hit the Insect poison to indigo.
- 'Jeff' (voice: Kentaro Ito)
  Nemesis of Chris. Life saved to the Yagyu, it settles in the mansion of Vlad. Was a sneak attack on Chris, with the cooperation of the heroes who happened into play, disappear bites a stop to Chris.
- 'Vlad' (voice: Akimitsu Takase)
  Foreign gentleman living in the mansion. Its identity vampire.
- 'Serizawa Kamo' (Serizawa duck) (voice: Makoto Aoki)
  Primary Shinsengumi-General. But it was executed in Okita us, revived by an external method.
- 'Soji Okita' (place was cleaning) (voice: Makoto Aoki)
  Shinsengumi most Corps underlings. But this time was already suffering from pulmonary tuberculosis, defying battle to leave the Mibu.
- 'Hanzo Hattori' (Hanzo Hattori) (voice: Shōto Kashii)
  From Azuchi Momoyama period Edo period dominating ninja to the initial. Why it is possessed to the body of the monkey jump.
- 'Musashi Miyamoto' (Musashi Miyamoto) (voice: Nao Takamori)
  Swordsman who was active from the Azuchi Momoyama period to the early Edo period. They are possessed corpse of the woman who disappeared in the shade Hen first Ichi story.
- 'Jubei Yagyu' (Yagyu throughout Bay) (voice: Toshitaka Shimizu)
  Swordsman who was active from the Azuchi Momoyama period to the early Edo period. Yagyu SoTakashi brother (not his brother that SoTakashi to Jubei is a historical fact). It is possessed corpse of the old man.
- 'Abe no Seimei' (Abeno first and last name) (voice: Nao Takamori)
  In the Heian period Onmyoji, father of bellflower. It appears in the figure of the boy.
- 'KamiebisuKyoshi Sina' (Kyoushirou Kamui) (voice: Akimitsu Takase)
  Of the mystery wearing a mask warriors. Torn to Kyowu, it disappear admitted him as a disciple. Someone else with the same name the person of "Kenfujo".
- 'Kunlun' (Conlon) (voice: Toshiaki Kuwahara)
  September 5, was born. Kunlun Mountains Qing Sendo mechanic took the "Yin Zhi jewels" at the top of. Ringleader subjected to the art of immortality in Yagyu suffered the dying of serious injury. It was treated with indigo that has been affected by the venom of a dragonfly, but was only the enemy hated for the Liu.
- 'Kurohaeokina' (NIS King) (voice: Kentaro Ito)
  Yagyu subordinates. After the Yagyu has been defeated, transformed into a giant fly, and fight heroes.
