= Paul Chen =

Paul Chen may refer to:

- Western name of Chen Chao-Po (b. 1955), founder of Dalian Hanwei Metal Co. Ltd.
- Paul Chen (businessman), Canadian software businessman
- Paolo Gumabao, (b. 1998 as Paul Chen), actor and model based in the Philippines

== See also ==
- Chen (surname)
