= Hanwei =

Hanwei may refer to: It may refer to:

- 韩伟, 韓偉 hánwěi, the Chinese for Greater Korea
  - historical name for the Three Kingdoms of Korea
  - Hanwei (egg producer) (韩伟 hánwěi), company based in Dalian, China
  - Wei Han (韓偉 Hán Wěi, 1906–1992), Lieutenant General of the Chinese People's Liberation Army
  - Wei Han (韓偉 Hán Wěi, 1928–1984), Taiwanese scholar
- Hanwei (sword producer) (汉威 hànwēi), company manufacturing swords based in Dalian, China
