= Tokyo Majin Gakuen Denki =

Japanese video game and media franchise

Tokyo Majin Gakuen Denki 東京魔人學園伝奇
- Genres: Supernatural, Adventure, Role-playing video game, Visual novel
- Developers: Main series Shout! Design Works; Related works also by Toybox Inc. Now Production
- Publishers: Main series Asmik Ace; Marvelous Entertainment; Related works Asmik Ace; Marvelous Entertainment; Atlus; Arc System Works
- Creator: Shuuhou Imai
- Platforms: Main series PlayStation, PlayStation 2, WonderSwan, Game Boy Advance, Nintendo DS, i-mode Related works also on PlayStation Portable, PlayStation Vita, PlayStation 3, PlayStation 4, Microsoft Windows, Nintendo Switch
- First release: Tokyo Majin Gakuen: Kenpūchō; June 18, 1998
- Latest release: Kowloon High-School Chronicle; June 4, 2020

Tokyo Majin Gakuen Denki (東京魔人學園伝奇; lit. 'Tokyo Wizard Academy Fantasy'), colloquially also known as Tokyo Majin Gakuen (東京魔人學園; lit. 'Tokyo Wizard Academy'), is a Japanese media franchise primarily focused on video games, with branches into other media such as manga, anime, light novels and audio dramas. Though no game in the franchise has been released outside Japan, an anime based thereupon and two related games – Tokyo Twilight Ghost Hunters and Kowloon High-School Chronicle – have.

The franchise began June 16, 1998, with the release of the PlayStation game Tokyo Majin Gakuen: Kenpūchō. Beyond the franchise itself, there are also several video games considered linked to it through style, setting, or systems. Coined by series director Shuuhou Imai (今井秋芳), the franchise, its broader sphere of related works, and their unifying style are collectively known as "young adult school fantasy" (學園ジュヴナイル伝奇, gakuen juvunairu denki) – i.e., entries all center on students fighting the supernatural (typically demonic creatures from Japanese folklore and Shinto). This moniker – Gakuen Juvenile Denki – has also occasionally been used as a "series name", both officially and by third parties, for some of these related works led by Imai.

== Video games ==
Many video games have been released in or adjacent to the Tokyo Majin Gakuen Denki franchise, connected not only in name, but often in themes and systems as well. Nearly all of the games present their narrative through visual novel-like story segments, while the non-expository gameplay segments vary considerably in nature.

The emotion input system's first incarnation, appearing in Kenpūchō. On the left are negative responses: worried, cold, sad, and angry. On the right are positive responses: loving, friendly, in agreement, and happy.

Perhaps the most iconic idiosyncrasy that unites most all titles under the wider Tokyo Majin Gakuen Denki umbrella is the so-called emotion input system (感情入力システム, kanjō nyūryoku shisutemu). During story segments, the game will occasionally prompt the player for a directional input into a cross-like interface. Each vertex of the cross corresponds to an emotion (or, in some cases, one of the five senses), and depending on the player's choice (inaction is also an option), their relationship with the character being spoken to may improve, worsen, or remain unchanged. Through this method, the player may gain (or fail to gain) extra party members, access (or irreversibly miss) special story scenes, or affect which ending they eventually reach. The system has been upheld as unique and distinctive of the franchise, as well as criticized as too obtuse.

=== Main series ===
The games in the main series share gameplay consisting of a mix of the aforementioned visual novel-like story segments, and of tactical RPG battles. The characters are students who must do battle with demonic creatures based in Japanese folk lore and Shinto. Between battles are visual novel-style story segments, in which the player nurtures the relationships between the protagonist and various characters.

Excluding remakes and expansions, only two main games have been released, with a third having been announced but ultimately canceled.

Game	Details
Tokyo Majin Gakuen: Kenpūchō Original release date: JP: June 18, 1998	Release years by system: 1997—PlayStation; 2008—Nintendo DS; 2012—PlayStation Network
Tokyo Majin Gakuen: Kenpūchō Original release date: JP: June 18, 1998	Notes: Tokyo Majin Gakuen: Kenpūchō (東京魔人學園剣風帖; lit. 'Tokyo Wizard Academy: Blade Gale Book') is the progenitor of the franchise. It is the foundation of the present-day Jin no Shō (人之章, lit. "Chapter of Mankind") setting, upon which many works would eventually be based.
Tokyo Majin Gakuen: Oboro-Kitan Original release date: JP: April 12, 1999	Release years by system: 1999—PlayStation; 2008—Nintendo DS; 2012—PlayStation Network
Tokyo Majin Gakuen: Oboro-Kitan Original release date: JP: April 12, 1999	Notes: Tokyo Majin Gakuen: Oboro-Kitan (東京魔人學園朧綺譚; lit. 'Tokyo Wizard Academy: Hazy Beautiful Tales') is a fan disc that provides extra content for Kenpūchō. Its content is also featured in the Nintendo DS remake of Kenpūchō.
Tokyo Majin Gakuen: Gehōchō Original release date: JP: January 24, 2002	Release years by system: 2002—PlayStation; 2012—PlayStation Network
Tokyo Majin Gakuen: Gehōchō Original release date: JP: January 24, 2002	Notes: The second main entry in the franchise. It assumes the form of a jidaigeki – a story set in ancient Japan. Focusing on the ancestors of the characters of Kenpūchō, it acts as a prequel, and is the foundation of the historical Ten no Shō (天之章, lit. "Chapter of Heaven") setting.
Tokyo Majin Gakuen Gehōchō: Keppūroku Original release date: JP: August 12, 2004	Release years by system: 2004—PlayStation 2
Tokyo Majin Gakuen Gehōchō: Keppūroku Original release date: JP: August 12, 2004	Notes: An expanded remake of Gehōchō for the PlayStation 2.
Tokyo Majin Gakuen: Teisenchō Cancellation date: JP: July 1, 2010	Proposed system release: 2008—Nintendo DS
Tokyo Majin Gakuen: Teisenchō Cancellation date: JP: July 1, 2010	Notes: Announced for the Nintendo DS on July 22, 2008, Tokyo Majin Gakuen: Teisenchō (東京魔人學園帝戰帖; lit. 'Tokyo Wizard Academy: Imperial War Book') was declared canceled in 2010. The script for the game's first chapter was made public with a 2013 DVD, and in 2018 provided to Famitsu by director Shuuhou Imai. In this manuscript, it is revealed that the game was slated to take place in Japan's Imperial capital in 1943, between the events of Kenpūchō and Gehōchō, and was to start in Manchuria. In a 2018 interview with the same magazine, Imai stated that he still hopes to one day bring the world Teisenchō's story.

=== Spin-offs ===
Game	Details
Tokyo Majin Gakuen: Fuju Hōroku Original release date: JP: October 12, 2000	Release years by system: 2000—WonderSwan; 2004—Game Boy Advance
Tokyo Majin Gakuen: Fuju Hōroku Original release date: JP: October 12, 2000	Notes: Tokyo Majin Gakuen: Fuju Hōroku (東京魔人學園符咒封録; lit. 'Tokyo Wizard Academy: Sealed Spell Chronicle') is a digital collectible card game spin-off to Kenpūchō for portable consoles. It replaces the game's tactical RPG systems with card-based battles, while retaining its visual novel elements. In release order, it is the second standalone game in the franchise.
Tokyo Majin Gakuen: Gunseiden Original release date: JP: July 7, 2007	Release years by system: 2007—i-mode
Tokyo Majin Gakuen: Gunseiden Original release date: JP: July 7, 2007	Notes: Tokyo Majin Gakuen: Gunseiden (東京魔人學園群星伝; lit. 'Tokyo Wizard Academy: Star Cluster Legend') is a fighting game for Japanese i-mode feature phones, developed and published by Marvelous Entertainment. The game features characters from Kenpūchō fighting each other.

=== Related ===
A number of games not officially part of the franchise, but which are considered linked to it through systems, setting, or Shuuhou Imai's influence, have also been released. Kowloon High-School Chronicle and Tokyo Twilight Ghost Hunters were directed by Imai. The Tenshō Gakuen series, Kamiyo Gakuen, and Tokyo Mono Hara Shi, however, borrow systems and themes from Tokyo Majin Gakuen Denki (and, in the latter case, Kowloon High-School Chronicle), but share little to no production staff with the franchise.

Game	Details
Tenshō Gakuen: Gensōroku Original release date: JP: May 27, 2004	Release years by system: 2004—PlayStation 2
Tenshō Gakuen: Gensōroku Original release date: JP: May 27, 2004	Notes: Developed by the Tokyo Majin Gakuen Denki franchise's original publisher Asmik Ace – after Marvelous Entertainment obtained the publishing rights, without the input of Shuuhou Imai – Tenshō Gakuen: Gensōroku is a hybrid of visual novel and tactical RPG highly reminiscent of the main series of Tokyo Majin Gakuen Denki games.
Kowloon High-School Chronicle Original release dates: JP: June 4, 2004; JP: September 28, 2006 (re:charge); JP: June 4, 2020 (ORIGIN OF ADVENTURE); NA: February 4, 2021; WW: May 21, 2021	Release years by system: 2004—PlayStation 2; 2006—PlayStation 2 (re:charge); JP: 2020; WW: 2021—Nintendo Switch; 2022—PlayStation 4, Microsoft Windows
Kowloon High-School Chronicle Original release dates: JP: June 4, 2004; JP: September 28, 2006 (re:charge); JP: June 4, 2020 (ORIGIN OF ADVENTURE); NA: February 4, 2021; WW: May 21, 2021	Notes: Kowloon High-School Chronicle (九龍妖魔學園紀, Kūron Yōma Gakuen-Ki; lit. 'Kowloon Spirit Academy Chronicle') is one of only two Tokyo Majin Gakuen Denki-adjacent games to be released outside Japan. An expanded edition bearing the subtitle re:charge also followed the game's original release. Over a decade later, the game received a remastered edition on Nintendo Switch by the name Kowloon Yōma Gakuen-Ki: ORIGIN OF ADVENTURE, which was eventually translated and released in English as Kowloon High-School Chronicle. Though not under the Tokyo Majin Gakuen Denki moniker, it shares the franchise's setting, and the protagonist of Kenpūchō appears as a hidden character. Inspired by films such as Indiana Jones and The Mummy, the game mixes visual novel segments with first-person dungeon crawling RPG gameplay. Unlike typical dungeon crawlers, puzzle elements feature prominently in the dungeons.
Tenshō Gakuen: Gekkōroku Original release date: JP: November 22, 2006	Release years by system: 2006—PlayStation 2
Tenshō Gakuen: Gekkōroku Original release date: JP: November 22, 2006	Notes: The sequel to Tenshō Gakuen: Gensōroku.
Kamiyo Gakuen: Genkōroku – Kuru Nu Gi A Original release date: JP: October 9, 2008	Release years by system: 2008—PlayStation 2
Kamiyo Gakuen: Genkōroku – Kuru Nu Gi A Original release date: JP: October 9, 2008	Notes: Developed by Idea Factory and published and produced by the Tokyo Majin Gakuen Denki franchise's original publisher Asmik Ace, Kamiyo Gakuen is similarly a visual novel-RPG hybrid featuring the emotion input system (though here called the "feeling system"). The RPG segments take the form of first-person JRPG battles. The development staff features the character designer from Tenshō Gakuen.
Tokyo Mono Hara Shi: Karasu no Mori Gakuen Kitan Original release date: JP: April 22, 2010	Release years by system: 2010—PlayStation Portable
Tokyo Mono Hara Shi: Karasu no Mori Gakuen Kitan Original release date: JP: April 22, 2010	Notes: Tokyo Mono Hara Shi is a spiritual successor to Kowloon High-School Chronicle in that it carries over most of the game's systems, in both visual novel and dungeon crawling modes. It is, however, unrelated by setting, and staff-wise only the character designer worked on both games.
Tokyo Twilight Ghost Hunters Original release dates: Original version: JP: April 10, 2014; NA: March 10, 2015; EU: March 13, 2015 (Physical); WW: April 8, 2015 (PS Store); Daybreak Special Gigs: JP: November 26, 2015; NA: September 20, 2016; WW: October 21, 2016; WW: March 17, 2017 (Windows)	Release years by system: Original version JP: 2014; WW: 2015—PlayStation Vita, PlayStation 3 Daybreak Special Gigs; JP: 2015; WW: 2016—PlayStation Vita, PlayStation 3, PlayStation 4; 2017—Microsoft Windows
Tokyo Twilight Ghost Hunters Original release dates: Original version: JP: April 10, 2014; NA: March 10, 2015; EU: March 13, 2015 (Physical); WW: April 8, 2015 (PS Store); Daybreak Special Gigs: JP: November 26, 2015; NA: September 20, 2016; WW: October 21, 2016; WW: March 17, 2017 (Windows)	Notes: Tokyo Twilight Ghost Hunters (魔都紅色幽撃隊, Mato Kurenai Yūgekitai; lit. 'Demon Capital Crimson Ghost-Fighting Squad'), along with its later expanded edition Daybreak Special Gigs, is the first game adjacent to the franchise to be released outside Japan. It carries over many elements from Kowloon High-School Chronicle's visual novel segments, but foregoes dungeon crawling for a battle system reminiscent of a board game.

== Anime ==
In 2007, the anime Tokyo Majin (Japanese: 東京魔人學園剣風帖龖, Hepburn: Tokyo Majin Gakuen Kenpūchō Tō; lit. 'Tokyo Wizard Academy: Blade Gale Book – Dragon's Flight') was broadcast in Japan. The same year, it was localized into English by ADV Films, becoming the franchise's first entry to be released outside Japan. It is a loose adaptation of the first game, Kenpūchō, though due to the absence of creative influence from series director Shuuhou Imai, it significantly differs from the original work.

== Other media ==
In a media mix marketing strategy, tangential works in other media have also been produced. This includes:

- The audio dramas Taimajin (退魔陣), Gekkōden (月紅伝), Kōryūsai (黄龍祭), Yōkitan (妖鬼譚), and Kagerō (陽炎). In addition, audio dramas based on Kowloon High-School Chronicle, Tenshō Gakuen: Gensōroku, Tenshō Gakuen: Gekkōroku, Tokyo Mono Hara Shi, and Tokyo Requiem have been released, as well as one only available with the Japanese limited edition of the Nintendo Switch version of Kowloon High-School Chronicle.
- The radio dramas Gakkyū Nikki (学級日誌; lit. 'Class Diary'), based on the anime, and Tokyo Majin Gakuen Hōsōbu (東京魔人學園放送部; lit. 'Tokyo Wizard Academy Broadcast Club') – the latter being web radio, later collected on DVD.
- The manga Tokyo Requiem (妖都鎮魂歌(トーキョー・レクイエム)).
- The light novel series Sōryūhen (双龍変). In addition, a light novel based on Tokyo Twilight Ghost Hunters: Daybreak Special Gigs has been released.
