= E's =

Multimedia franchise based on manga of the same name

- The first volume of E's, published in Japan by Square Enix on March 18, 2003

エス (Esu)
- Genre: Action, fantasy, science fiction
- Manga
- Written by: Satoru Yuiga
- Published by: Enix (1997-2003); Square Enix (2003-2010)
- English publisher: NA: Broccoli Books
- Magazine: Monthly GFantasy
- Original run: 1997 – 2010
- Volumes: 16
- Anime television series

E's Otherwise
- Directed by: Masami Shimoda
- Produced by: Norio Yamakawa; Hidenori Itahashi; Ken Hagino
- Written by: Katsuhiko Chiba
- Music by: Hajime Hyakkoku; Kazunori Miyake
- Studio: Studio Pierrot
- Licensed by: NA: ADV Films
- Original network: TXN (TV Tokyo)
- English network: US: Anime Network
- Original run: April 1, 2003 – September 23, 2003
- Episodes: 26
- Light novel

E's The Time to Baptisma
- Written by: Satoru Yuiga
- Published by: Enix
- Imprint: GFantasy
- Published: February 26, 1999
- Light novel

E's Unknown Kingdom
- Written by: Satoru Yuiga
- Published by: Enix
- Imprint: GFantasy
- Published: January 27, 2000

E's (Japanese: エス, Hepburn: Esu) is a Japanese shōnen manga series written and drawn by Satoru Yuiga. It was originally serialized in Monthly GFantasy from 1997 through 2005, and later published in 16 tankōbon volumes by Square Enix from March 18, 2003, to February 27, 2010. The series focuses on Kai Kudō, an "Esper", who is recruited by an organization called Ashurum to become a soldier to purportedly save other psychics from regular humans. After a mission in Gald goes wrong, Kai finds himself living with a man named Yuuki and his adopted sister Asuka. As he learns more about Ashurum, Kai finds himself wondering what their true goals are, and worrying about his ill sister, who is under Ashurum's care.

The series was adapted into a twenty-six episode anime series entitled E's Otherwise (エス·アザーワイズ) by Studio Pierrot. It debuted in Japan on April 1, 2003, on TV Tokyo; the final episode aired on September 23, 2003. Two light novels and three drama CDs related to the series have also been released in Japan.

Broccoli Books licensed the manga series for English-language publication in North America in 2006. ADV Films licensed the anime series for North American broadcast and distribution, with the English dubbed version of the series airing on Anime Network.

== Plot ==
Kai and Hikaru are protected by a corporation called ASHURUM, from a society that fears E's. ASHURUM is 1 of the 12 corporations that rule the world. Found by Eiji, Kai was selected to be in ASHURUM's special force AESES and had to undergo intensive training in different areas, such as combat, hacking, and psychic training.

When Kai had free time he visited Hikaru at the hospital. Hikaru's condition never improved, however. After a year, Shen-long warned Kai that Eiji actually only wanted his sister, because she was said to possess amazing psychic powers, but she was not able to use them due to her illness. Shen-long then went on to tell Kai that Eiji was just hoping that Kai would have those amazing powers too.

Kai did not believe Shen-long and goes on a mission to Gald city, with the other E's, to infiltrate a hideout of guerillas that is said to have been using E's against their will. Kai finds some civilians caught in the middle of the battle. While trying to save a little girl, one of the civilians that is afraid of E's, shoots and kills Kai's partner.

Kai, still shocked from the death of his partner, tries to help the civilians, but meets up with Shen-long. In a rage, Shen-long unleashes a psychic blast that decimates half the city.

Later, Kai, washed up ashore, was found by a girl named Asuka. After being brought back to health, Kai was told by Yuuki, Asuka's brother, that he would not have his psychic powers back to the level they were unless he goes back to ASHURUM. However, after spending some time in the city with its residents, Kai decides to stay with Asuka and Yuuki for a while. As it turns out, ASHURUM has been brain-washing Kai and the other E's in order to make them more powerful. Eiji plans to use Hikaru to destroy the human race to 'speed up evolution' so that only E's survive.

== Characters ==
Kai Kudō (戒=玖堂, Kai Kudō)
Kai Kudō is the series protagonist. Orphaned before the start of the anime, his only remaining family member is his sickly sister Hikaru Kudō, who is noted to have extremely powerful psychic powers. It is also believed by Eiji Sagimiya that Kai also has the potential to become powerful as Hikaru, but either he has not unlocked these powers out of dormancy yet or isn't aware of them. He's also extremely sensitive to sweets, to the point where even the mention or sight of it makes him uneasy. Kai and Hikaru were taken by ASHURUM in order to receive protection from people who hate espers, and in return Kai has to enroll into AESES, a psychic division with similarities to the Special forces in the U.S. military. However, his stay was rendered short after a failed mission that resulted in the death of his partner and a devastating psychic explosion that throws him into Gald, a run-down city run by crime syndicates. Although he was met with distrust from Yuki Tokugawa, a Gald resident who hates espers, Kai is eventually accepted by him and his little foster sister Asuka Tokugawa, a young empath who develops a crush on him. It is during his stay in Gald where Kai starts seeing the kinder side of humanity. Toward the end of the anime, Kai helps his former rival Shen-Long Belvedere in restoring his twin sister's personality, after being informed of ASHURUM's true purposes, and is later aided in rescuing Hikaru from Eiji by Yuki. Kai confronts Eiji on his true motives, and engages in a final decisive battle for the fate of the world. It is not explicitly known what the outcome of the battle was, it is implied that Kai had won but it is hotly debated whether he survived and is somewhere on the other side of the planet or he sacrificed his life to beat Eiji. In the anime television series, Kai is voiced by Yūki Tai in Japanese and Chris Patton in English.
Hikaru Kudō (光流=玖堂, Hikaru Kudō)
Hikaru Kudō is Kai's orphaned younger sister. Hikaru is an innocent, childlike girl who is an esper harboring immensely powerful psychic abilities, but due to an unknown illness she is unable to use them and remains bedridden for the duration of the anime until the end. Her frail condition led her to being hospitalized in ASHURUM's hospital, where her stay is often frequented by visits from Kai or Eiji, her caretaker. Kai often worries about Hikaru's well-being and occasionally experiences dreams about his younger sister. Later, Hikaru is taken away by Eiji, who wants to use her psychic abilities to wipe out most of Earth's population because he claims that it'll make espers like her "happy". The plan is nearly successful, as Hikaru was put into a machine that enhances her telepathic abilities to the point it can cover and attack a vast area of people, but Kai, who was informed by Shen-Long, and Yuki Tokugawa intervened and rescued her from such a fate. She is later seen in Gald in perfect condition, watching the night stars with Asuka Tokugawa. In the anime television series, Hikaru is voiced by Hisayo Mochizuki in Japanese and Danielle Kimball in English.
Shen-Long Belvedere (神龍(シェンロン)=ベルヴェディア, Shenron Beruvedia)
Shen-Long Belvedere is the younger twin brother of Shin-Lu Belvedere, his older sister. He is a very powerful psychic, capable of telekinesis and teleportation. He also hates anyone who gets in his way, especially Kai, with whom he develops an antagonistic rivalry. Shen-Long hates normal humans because of the rough childhood they caused him and Shin-Lu, and is very protective of his sister. Shen-Long is revealed to be telepathically linked to Shin-Lu, after being affected by the intense pain of a telepathic attack that rendered his sister comatose. In a rage, he creates a devastating psychic explosion that wipes out the entire area, causing Kai to end up in Gald. Later, he finds that Shin-Lu had recovered, but was also brainwashed, causing him to search for ways to restore her old personality, siding with Kai to achieve this. Shen-Long also discovers that Eiji took in Hikaru, Kai's younger sister, so he can use her powers to wipe out most of Earth's population. At the end of the anime, Shen-Long engages in a vicious psychic battle with his older sister, and succeeds in snapping her out of her brainwashing at the cost of himself. It is unknown whether Shen-Long had survived this fate. In the anime television series, Shen-Long is voiced by Masako Nozawa in Japanese and Greg Ayres in English.
Shin-Lu Belvedere (神露(シンルー)=ベルヴェディア, Shinrū Beruvedia)
Shin-Lu Belvedere is the older sister to her younger twin brother Shen-Long. She cares about her younger brother a lot as an older sister should, but she is frustrated with his condescending and sardonic attitude towards Kai Kudō, a newcomer recruited into ASHURUM. She initially began developing some sort of affection for Kai, as evidenced by baking a cake for him. During one of the first missions assigned to Kai's division during the beginning of the anime, she was rendered comatose by a telepathic attack on her mind, which immediately affected Shen-Long because of their telepathic link. Later on she was revived, but upon being found by Shen-Long she revealed to be brain washed after recovering. Shin-Lu then engaged in a vicious psychic battle with her younger brother, but was seemingly snapped out of her brainwashing when she mortally wounded Shen-Long. In the anime television series, Shin-Lu is voiced by Akeno Watanabe in Japanese and Kira Vincent-Davis in English.
Yuki Tokugawa (勇基=篤川, Yūki Tokugawa)
Yuki Tokugawa is Asuka's foster brother and one of the few residents of Gald, a run-down city led by crime syndicates. He takes odd jobs for money, which he uses to support his younger foster sister and himself. He also takes care of the orphaned kids that do not have a family. When Kai Kudō winds up in Gald after a devastating explosion caused by Shen-Long Belvedere, Yuki instinctively distrusts him because of his esper heritage and even came close to shooting him, but allows Kai to stay at his house for a while and later becomes one of his strongest allies against ASHURUM. He later aids Kai in rescuing his younger sister Hikaru from Eiji's clutches while Kai goes and distracts Eiji in a decisive battle. In the anime television series, Yuki is voiced by Yasunori Matsumoto in Japanese and Ben Pronsky in English.
Asuka Tokugawa (明日香=篤川, Asuka Tokugawa)
Asuka Tokugawa is a resident of a run-down city named Gald, and is the younger foster sister of Yuki. Orphaned before the start of the anime, she was among the first children in Gald that Yuki started taking care of, and now ended up living with him. Asuka adores animals and had developed a habit of taking in any strays that she finds. She is kind and caring, but dislikes being useless. Asuka often makes well-intended attempts to help around the house, but her cooking is horrible to the point Yuki has banned her from their kitchen, to her chagrin. She is later revealed to be an empath, a person who "senses" the feelings of others, as she explains to Kai. It was Asuka who introduces Kai to the kinder side of humanity, making him side with them in the end. After the events of the series, Asuka is shown standing with Kai's sister Hikaru, showing her the stars for the first time. In the anime television series, Asuka is voiced by Sanae Kobayashi in Japanese and Hilary Haag in English.
Eiji Sagimiya (曳士=鷺宮, Eiji Sagimiya)
Eiji Sagimiya is the mysterious head of ASHURUM, a corporation that protects espers, known as "E's", from those who would rather have them dead. He was the one who brought the Kudō siblings Kai and Hikaru to ASHURUM long after they were orphaned, bringing medical care for Hikaru, who became ill with an unknown sickness. At first Eiji is a kind but firm person, and protective of the espers under his care, and is even trusted by Kai. He oversees the activities of ASHURUM, organizing "missions" for the espers that seem to have a benefit for outside society, hoping the espers will eventually receive equal treatment. However, in reality he is revealed to be manipulative and has inner motives. He desires to destroy the majority of Earth's population and reshape it into a world where only espers live, without having to deal with prejudice and racism against their kind, which was why he kept Hikaru and Kai because of their immensely powerful psychic abilities. However, Kai found out from Shen-Long about Eiji's involvement with Hikaru and intervened with his plans, resulting in a final decisive battle that revealed Eiji as one of the espers. In the anime television series, Eiji is voiced by Akimitsu Takase in Japanese and Jay Hickman in English.
Maria (マリア)
Maria is a witch and the granddaughter of Erimiya. She befriends Yuki and later aids him in his quest to bring down ASHURUM. In the anime television series, Maria is voiced by Akiko Hiramatsu in Japanese and Christine Auten in English.
Erimiya (衿宮)
Erimiya is the grandfather of Maria, a witch, and the local wise man of Gald. He has precognitive abilities, and it is because of this why Eiji highly values him. He was kept hidden from those who seek to exploit him for his knowledge of the future or kill him. Erimiya serves as one of the key players in predicting the final battle between humanity and ASHURUM's espers. He is responsible for telepathically attacking Shin-Lu and causing Shen-Long to go berserk and destroying much of Gald. In the anime television series, Erimiya is voiced by Mahito Tsujimura in Japanese and T.P. Postlewaithe in English.

== Media ==
=== Manga ===
Written and illustrated by Satoru Yuiga, E's was first serialized in GFantasy in 1997. The individual chapters were then compiled into 16 tankōbon volumes by Square Enix. The first volume was released on March 18, 2003, with the final volume released on February 27, 2010.

The series licensed for an English-language release in North America by Broccoli Books. However Broccoli International USA closed down at the end of 2008 and stopped all printing in progress and have halted release of new works. As of October 2007, the company has published four volumes of the series. The series is also licensed for regional language releases in German by Carlsen Comics and in Chinese by Tong Li Publishing.

=== Anime ===
Studio Pierrot adapted the manga series into a twenty-six episode anime series entitled E's Otherwise (エス·アザーワイズ). Directed by Masami Shimoda, the episodes debuted in Japan on April 1, 2003, on TV Tokyo; the final episode aired on September 23, 2003.

ADV Films licensed the anime series for North American distribution in 2004. It initially released the series across 6 DVD volumes, with the first volume released on February 15, 2005, and the final volume released March 21, 2006. On December 12, 2006, the company re-released the entire series in a single five-disc box set. ADV Films also released the series in Germany, with German dubbing provided by Elektrofilm.

The anime series uses two pieces of theme music. "Jōhō" (情報) performed by Suitei-Shōjo is used for the series opening theme, while "Tonight/Midnight" by Chicochair is used for the ending theme.

==== Episode listing ====
No.	Title (Note: All English titles listed are the official English titles as determined by ADV Films.)	Original release date
1	"A Superficial Peace"; Transliteration: "Kyoshoku no Heion" (Japanese: 虚飾の平穏)	April 1, 2003
Kai Kudō, said to have supernatural psychic abilities, is revived by Eiji Sagimiya in the ASHURUM corporation. After undergoing a year of intense training in the AESES division, Kai is given the mission to arrest a psychic criminal roaming the streets. After finding the criminal, Kai is soon able to trap him in a sphere of water.
2	"We Are Not Here to Destroy"; Transliteration: "Warera Hakai no Tame de Naku" (Japanese: 我ら破壊の為でなく)	April 8, 2003
Eiji assigns the AESES division to infiltrate Gald, a run-down city led by crime syndicates. Kai tries to persuade Eiji for him not to carry his gun for this mission, seeing as he is against killing his opponents. Meanwhile, Yuki Tokugawa is sent to see Erimiya, who tells him that the ASHURUM corporation has sent the AESES division to find the Sacrament of Calvaria from within the city.
3	"The Arrow That Has Been Loosed"; Transliteration: "Hanatareta Ya" (Japanese: 放たれた矢)	April 15, 2003
In the midst of the inflamed city, Kai rescues a girl inside a building and leaves her in the care of Ruri Hisaishi. However, Ruri is soon shot by a group of residents, causing Kai react out of rage. Elsewhere, Shin-Lu Belvedere is rendered unconscious due to Erimiya's power. Her brother Shen-Long Belvedere comes to her aid and also attacks Kai for ignoring the operation, causing a mass explosion encompassing the city.
4	"At the Place He Washed Ashore"; Transliteration: "Hyōchaku no Chi de" (Japanese: 漂着の地で)	April 22, 2003
Kai is washed ashore to a greenhouse, where is treated for his wounds and then interrogated by Yuki, who is soon interrupted by his younger sister Asuka Tokugawa. Doctor Asakura, believing that the ASHURUM corporation has brainwashed the AESES division, suggests that Kai should stay in the greenhouse to recuperate from his weakened state before returning to the ASHURUM corporation.
5	"Magnificant Approach"; Transliteration: "Karei Naru Apurōchi" (Japanese: 華麗なる助走)	April 29, 2003
Failing to make breakfast for him, Asuka takes Kai with her to the shopping district. While on their way back, Asuka senses what Kai is struggling with. Kai is later summoned by Yuki to enter a casino disguised as a couple, given the task to assist the police department in having a crime syndicate leader arrested.
6	"Test Site City"; Transliteration: "Jikkenjō no Machi" (Japanese: 実験場の街)	May 6, 2003
Kai and Yuki are assigned to locate a cybernetic human for a client. When they find the human in the streets, they noticed it wearing a laser ring. Asuka later comes along, making matter worse, as she becomes a target. The three escape to a warehouse storing some weapons. When the cybernetic human finds them again, Kai shoots at it repeatedly, gradually disabling it and soon causing it to self-destruct.
7	"Purple Destiny"; Transliteration: "Pāpuru Desutinī" (Japanese: パープルデスティニー)	May 13, 2003
Kai and Yuki are hired at a library to capture a man wearing a purple mask, who is after the first edition of a comic book series. Leonid, an acquaintance of Yuki, later finds the two in the library. When the masked man appears, it is revealed that he has psychic powers and has been identified as a comic book enthusiast. The masked man becomes weak after using up his powers after being chased.
8	"Interlude: The Chronicle of the Rise and Fall of Tokugawa Ramen"; Transliteration: "Interlude Rāmen Tokugawa Seisui Ki" (Japanese: Interlude ラーメン篤川盛衰記)	May 20, 2003
Kai and Yuki discuss about how Asuka is unable to cook and about how Yuki chooses to protect her. When the three decide to go to a ramen shop, Yuki is displeased with its service. After acquiring the necessary ingredients for the perfect recipe, the three open up their own outdoor ramen shop, attracting many customers. Unfortunately, Asuka accidentally destroys it.
9	"The Bewitched Soul"; Transliteration: "Miseraretaru Tamashii" (Japanese: 魅せられたる魂)	May 27, 2003
Leonid tells Yuki to convince Kai to dress up like a woman again, setting him up on a date with a client named Edgar Hanson. Kai becomes speechless when Edgar unexpectedly proposes to him. It is soon realized that Edgar is wanted for an arrest, explaining that he is an arms broker in order to secure the alliance of the twelve guerrilla corporations of Gald.
10	"Rewritten Memory"; Transliteration: "Riraiteddo Memorī" (Japanese: リライテッドメモリー)	June 3, 2003
Shin-Lu is released from the hospital and taken to the laboratory to have her memory overridden, unbeknownst to Shen-Long. Later on, Shen-Long encounters Maxim Feller, along with Sherry and Kyou, who are now his new teammates. Kyou provokes Shen-Long into a duel, but Maxim intervenes and restricts Shen-Long's powers. Shin-Lu later confronts Shen-Long about how he put Kai's life in danger by the explosion he caused at Gald.
11	"Sweet Melancholy"; Transliteration: "Suwītto na Yūutsu" (Japanese: スウィートな憂鬱)	June 10, 2003
Kai becomes a bodyguard for Dzhyuma for a few days. Yuki finds out that Dzhyuma is the adopted son of the president of the anti-psychic weaponry production guerrilla corporation. Kai and Yuki prevent a man from stealing Dzhyuma's research equipment, but the two become suspicious of Dzhyuma's intentions. He momentarily shows his jamming device, capable of weakening the psychics through electromagnetic waves.
12	"Blind Spot"; Transliteration: "Buraindo Supotto" (Japanese: ブラインドスポット)	June 17, 2003
Dzhyuma is permitted by Yuki to borrow Kai for his research, yet Kai grows to respect him. While Dzhyuma goes on a date with Asuka, Kai and Yuki walk them from a distance. It is not long before Kai and Yuki are forced to use the jamming device against two psychics sent by Dzhyuma's father. Dzhyuma sends his regards to Kai and Yuki, and he leaves Asuka with a gown as a gift of his affection.
13	"Innocent Enthusiasm"; Transliteration: "Muku Naru Jōnetsu" (Japanese: 無垢なる情熱)	June 24, 2003
Yuki goes to an orphanage to donate, but he is too embarrassed for Kai and Asuka to know. Meanwhile, Kai and Asuka go out to search for a lost cat in the streets. The two eventually track down the lost cat in a restricted area, and they then receive a monetary reward from the owner. Maria later contacts Yuki for him to bring her the psychic that he has been sheltering, not knowing she was referring to Asuka instead of Kai.
14	"Solitary Shooting Star"; Transliteration: "Kodoku na Ryūsei" (Japanese: 孤独な流星)	July 1, 2003
Shen-Long begins to see changes in his sister's personality over time. Professor Chigaya summons Shin-Lu to participate in a mock battle against Shen-Long in the training chamber. Shin-Lu easily defeats her brother in combat, to which Eiji compares the psychic abilities of Kai to that of Maxim. Shen-Long is taken to the intensive care unit room, but he disappears when Shin-Lu enters the room.
15	"Residents of Paradise"; Transliteration: "Rakuen no Jūnin" (Japanese: 楽園の住人)	July 8, 2003
Kai begins to lose control of his psychic powers, and he vanishes right before Asuka's eyes. He appears at a cathedral, where he meets a group of psychic children who called him through telepathy. Kai tries to escape, but he is stopped by Cardinal Ghibelline. After evading to the outside, Kai meets Erimiya, who tells him to discover himself. Soon after, Shen-Long attacks Kai for how Shin-Lu has changed after the explosion at Gald.
16	"Similar Vessels"; Transliteration: "Ainitaru Utsuwa" (Japanese: 相似たる器)	July 15, 2003
Ghibelline proves his knowledge about Kai from research, much to the latter's dismay. After Kai seeing a sickly Raphael being tested against anti-psychic weaponry, Ghibelline requests Kai to stay at the cathedral in order to use his psychic powers to find the Sacrament of Calvaria. Kai encounters Maxim, who attacks him mercilessly. At the same time, Hikaru collapses in Eiji's presence, due to the psychic energy felt through Kai.
17	"Escape to the Light"; Transliteration: "Hikari e no Dasshutsu" (Japanese: 光への脱出)	July 22, 2003
Kai attempts to release the psychic children from the cathedral, but Ghibelline does any means necessary to prevent the matter. When Raphael becomes separated along with Kai from the other children, he uses telepathy to reach out to and reunite with them, as they all make their way to the outside. Kai asks Yuki to take the psychic children to the orphanage for the time being.
18	"Same Bed, Different Dreams"; Transliteration: "Dōshōimu" (Japanese: 同床異夢)	July 29, 2003
Shin-Lu tries persuade Kai to return to the ASHURUM corporation, even to the point of singing. Kyou shows up and taunts Kai for being weak, and Shin-Lu also tries to prove to him that she has gotten strong through training. Meanwhile, Asuka is visited by Maria, who wants to bring her to see Erimiya. However, Maxim arrives and tries to capture Asuka for his own purposes, to which Maria does anything she can to prevent that from happening.
19	"As You Are Guided"; Transliteration: "Michibikareru Mama ni" (Japanese: 導かれるままに)	August 5, 2003
Shen-Long takes Shin-Lu back to the ASHURUM corporation, later realizing that Eiji was wounded when Hikaru collapsed. Sherry calls Kyou in for a mission, later recognized as to capture Asuka. After Kai says his farewell to Raphael, he recalls about a discussion with Eiji concerning telepathy. Yuki, who resists working with Maria, learns that Asuka is a psychic. Kai finds out that Yuki and Asuka are headed towards the guerrilla home base.
20	"Intent and Fate"; Transliteration: "Ishi to Unmei" (Japanese: 意思と運命)	August 12, 2003
Kai goes back to the cathedral, surprisingly finding Leonid investigating about the home base, and they soon find an underground passageway that might lead there. Hitomi gives an impatient Shen-Long some information about Shin-Lu's behavioral change after her rehabilitation. Yuki, Asuka, and Maria board with Sherry and Kyou on a ship serviced by Rikumi, but the former three are unaware that they are directing the latter two into the home base.
21	"Cruel Flame"; Transliteration: "Reikoku na Honō" (Japanese: 冷酷な炎)	August 19, 2003
Yuki prevents Sherry from stealing Erimiya's will, but he is later charged at by Kyou as a distraction. Erimiya defends himself against Maxim's attacks, but it is not long before he is overwhelmed. Kai appears and defeats Kyou, and he then fights Maxim for Erimiya's life. However, Erimiya's dies in Kai's arms when Maria arrives.
22	"Rhapsody"; Transliteration: "Rapusodī" (Japanese: 狂想曲)	August 26, 2003
Maria comes to the house to battle Kai, assuming that he was one who killed Erimiya. Kai knocks her unconscious after saying he is not at fault. In the next morning, Kai attempts to reason with Maria, but she leaves by pointing out how the guerrilla corporations treat psychics as weapons rather than as people. Eiji travels to Gald to show Erimiya's will to Ghibelline, convincing an alliance with him.
23	"Distant Dawn"; Transliteration: "Tōi Yoake" (Japanese: 遠い夜明け)	September 2, 2003
Unable to cease the two military forces of the rivaled corporations from engaging in war, Kai inflames his psychic energy and eradicates the area. This has an effect upon Hikaru, who calls out for Kai, although Asuka is somehow able to hear her voice as well. Sherry and Shin-Lu prepare to head towards the home base. Maxim, now recuperated, fails to tell Eiji that he dreamed of seeing Kai as his reflection.
24	"Waking Nightmare"; Transliteration: "Mezameshi Akumu" (Japanese: 目覚めし悪夢)	September 9, 2003
Asakura unveils to Hitomi that Eiji has not only been altering the memories of the psychics, but has also been planning to create a society of psychics. Meanwhile, Eiji reveals to Kai his superior psychic abilities, while noting that Kai currently has no identity. Asakura further mentions that it is possible to restore the memories of the psychics. Kai finds Shen-Long when he breaks into the laboratory, however Chigaya tries to interfere.
25	"Harvest Time"; Transliteration: "Shūkaku no Toki" (Japanese: 収穫のとき)	September 16, 2003
Eiji bring Hikaru to the home base via helicopter. After making it to the arms hangar, Kai and Shen-Long use a military airplane to travel back to Gald. A wounded Leonid appears at the house with footage of the home base. A cybernetic Kyou soon shows up and attacks Maria, yet Yuki chases him away using the jamming device and a bazooka gun. After viewing the footage, Leonid says that Gald has become an execution site.
26	"The Approaching Daybreak"; Transliteration: "Kitaru Beki Reimei" (Japanese: 来るべき黎明)	September 23, 2003
Shen-Long is forced to fight Shin-Lu, and Maria later settles a score with Maxim. Kai goes into the chamber where Hikaru is contained. When Kai is unable to stand his ground against Eiji, Yuki arrives and attempts to save Hikaru. Hikaru emits a burst of light awakening the Sacrament of Calvaria, yet Asuka is able to calm her down from afar. Kai and Eiji disappear as they collide in psychic energy, causing destruction within the city. Yuki, Asuka, and Hikaru all wait for Kai to return to them one day.

=== Light novels ===
Two light novels adaptations of the manga, also written by Yuiga, have been published by Square Enix. The first volume, E's The Time to Baptisma, was published on February 26, 1999. The second volume, E's Unknown Kingdom, followed on January 27, 2000.

=== Drama CDs ===
Square Enix released three drama CDs based around the manga. The first, E's Volume 1 was released on September 25, 1999. The second, E'S Vol Extra, followed on March 24, 2000. The final volume, E's Volume 2, which used the same voice actors as the anime adaptation, was released on September 26, 2003, after the television broadcast concluded.

=== Other media ===
E's Zero World Guidance (E'S ワールドガイダンス 零, E'S Waarudo Gaidansu Rei), published by Square Enix in August 2003, is a guidebook containing additional information about the various fictional aspects of the series, characters, etc.

eSpecial: E's Postcard Book contains fifteen postcards featuring characters from the series was published in March 2003.
