= Tokyo Mono Hara Shi: Karasu no Mori Gakuen Kitan =

2010 video game

- Developer: Atlus
- Publisher: Atlus
- Artist: Saito Susumu
- Writer: Akatsuki Kawasaki
- Composers: Kenichi Tsuchiya; Atsushi Kitajoh
- Series: Tokyo Majin Gakuen
- Platform: PlayStation Portable
- Release: JP: April 22, 2010
- Genres: Adventure, role-playing
- Mode: Single-player

Tokyo Mono Hara Shi: Karasu no Mori Gakuen Kitan (東京鬼祓師 鴉乃杜學園奇譚) is an adventure Role-playing video game developed and published by Atlus for the PlayStation Portable. The game is a spin-off of the Tokyo Majin Gakuen media franchise, and was released in Japan on April 22, 2010.

== Gameplay ==
The game is combination of visual novel and dungeon crawler.

When it is time for school, the player can talk with classmates while searching for clues and tracking down cursed hanafuda cards. The emotion input system lets the player respond to discussions and bond with sub-characters by selecting a feeling. School exploration is done via a menu.

=== Combat ===
Dungeons are shown from a first-person perspective. While exploring, the player can trigger commands like "jump" with the face buttons. There is no transition prior to battles.

== Plot ==
The story centered on a group of high school students tracking down cursed hanafuda cards that released demons called the "hidden people" into the human world.

== Music ==
The opening theme "Trump Card" (キリフダ, Kirifuda), composed by Kenichi Tsuchiya and sung by Haruka Tomatsu. The ending theme "Song of Invitation" (誘の訴, Izanai no Uta) is composed by Atsushi Kitajoh and sung by Haruka Tomatsu.

== CD Drama ==
Volume 1 was released on June 23, 2010 and volume 2 was released on July 22, 2010 in Japan by Frontier Works.
