= Yoshihara =

Yoshihara is a Japanese surname. Notable people with the surname include:

- Daijiro Yoshihara (born 1978), Japanese racing driver
- Jiro Yoshihara (1905–1972), Japanese painter
- Kota Yoshihara (born 1978), Japanese footballer
- Mari Yoshihara (born 1968), American academic
- Yoshihara Shigetoshi (1845–1887), Japanese diplomat
- Shinya Yoshihara (born 1978), Japanese footballer
- Tomoko Yoshihara (born 1970), Japanese volleyball player
- Yukari Yoshihara (born 1973), Japanese Go player
- Yoshindo Yoshihara (born 1943), Japanese swordsmith
- Nancy Yoshihara, American journalist and co-founder of the Asian American Journalists Association
