= Acid (Japanese band) =

Japanese rock band

- Origin: Japan
- Genres: Alternative metal; emo; post-hardcore
- Years active: 2003–2009
- Labels: Akatsuki Label
- Past members: Masamitsu; Junpei; Kim; Hideki; Daisuke; Yuta; Seiichiro

Acid was a Japanese rock band originally created by Hideki after Siam Shade disbanded.

== History ==
Acid formed in August 2003 through auditions held by Hideki. Their live setlist was made up of both of Hideki's solo albums at the beginning and, after one year of excessive touring through Japan, the group went into the studio at the end of 2004 to record their first album. Acid 1.5: Punk Drunker was released in March 2005.

With the end of Siam Shade, Hideki didn't want people to always compare the two bands, which is why he chose to change his position to behind the keyboard, before later leaving Acid completely in June 2005. Furthermore, he stated after his departure that Acid is his pride and that he would like to see them perform live at Tokyo Dome one day.

However, after losing a few more members (Kim left in 2006 to join the mandatory military services back in Korea, Junpei left in 2008 due to health problems, along with Masamitsu who left for unknown reasons), the three remaining members decided to disband and create a new band. Mizuki Sakagami, who used to play with Daisuke in E.mu, joined them in 2009 as the vocalist and they adopted Needless Lyrics as their new name.

== Musical style ==
In the beginning, Hideki had a huge influence on Acid and they played a mix of alternative metal and emo with emphasis placed on his and Junpei's twin vocals. After he left the band in 2005, their songs became less focused on vocals and turned a bit more pop-ish, but still kept their "heavy" sound due to having three guitarists.

== Final lineup ==
- Daisuke – vocals, guitars (2005–2009)
- Yuta – bass guitars (2003–2009)
- Seiichiro – drums, percussion (2003–2009)

=== Past members ===
- Masamitsu – guitars (2003–2008)
- Junpei – vocals, screaming (2003–2008)
- Kim – guitars (2003–2006)
- Hideki – vocals, keyboards, piano (2003–2005)

== Discography ==
Albums

- 2005 – Acid 1.5: Punk Drunker
- 2005 – Acid 1.7: Spiritual Circus
- 2006 – Acid 2.0: Spiritual Circus Complete
- 2007 – Pray for the Future

Singles

- 2007 – "0:00 AM/Hanafubuki" – opening/ending theme to the anime Tokyo Majin Gakuen Kenpuchō: Tō
- 2008 – "Sekai ga Owaru Made wa.../Fake"

Demo

- 2004 – "Acid 1 ~ Punk Drunker" – only sold at live shows)
1. "Business"
2. "Place of Love"
3. "Renewal My Soul"
4. "Zaisei"
5. "Precious Day"
6. "We Are What We Are"
