= Dalian Hanwei Metal =

Chinese manufacturing company

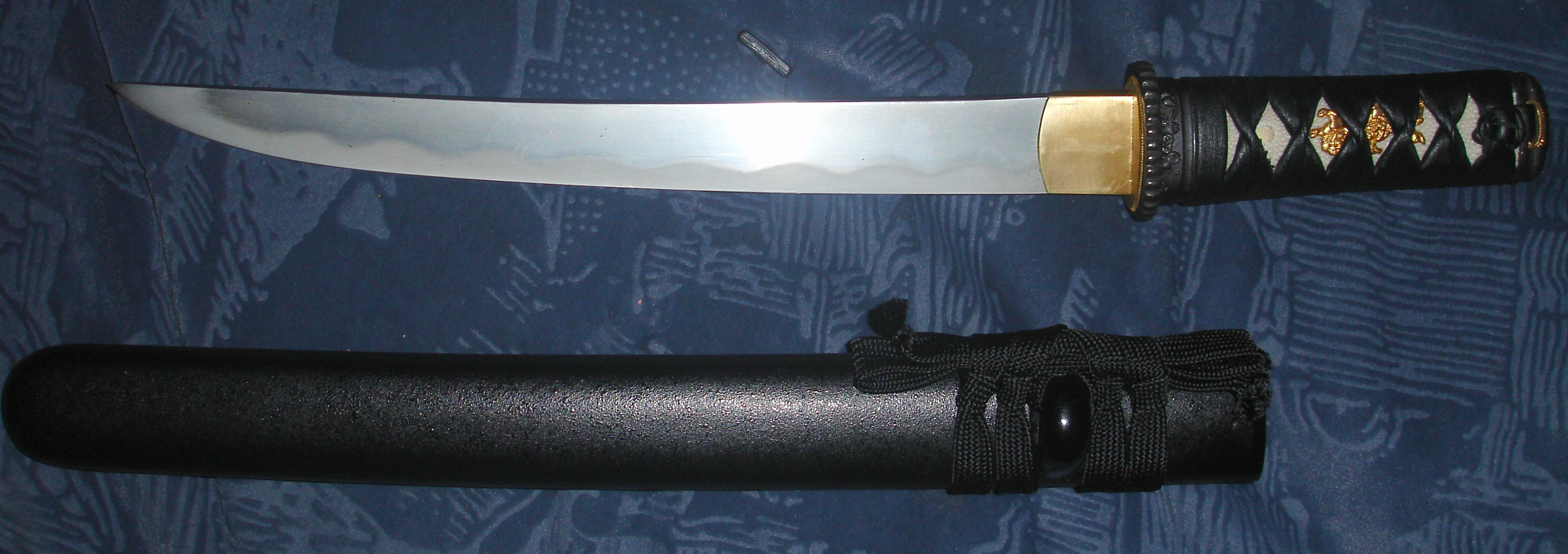
"Practical Plus Tanto" (SH2259)

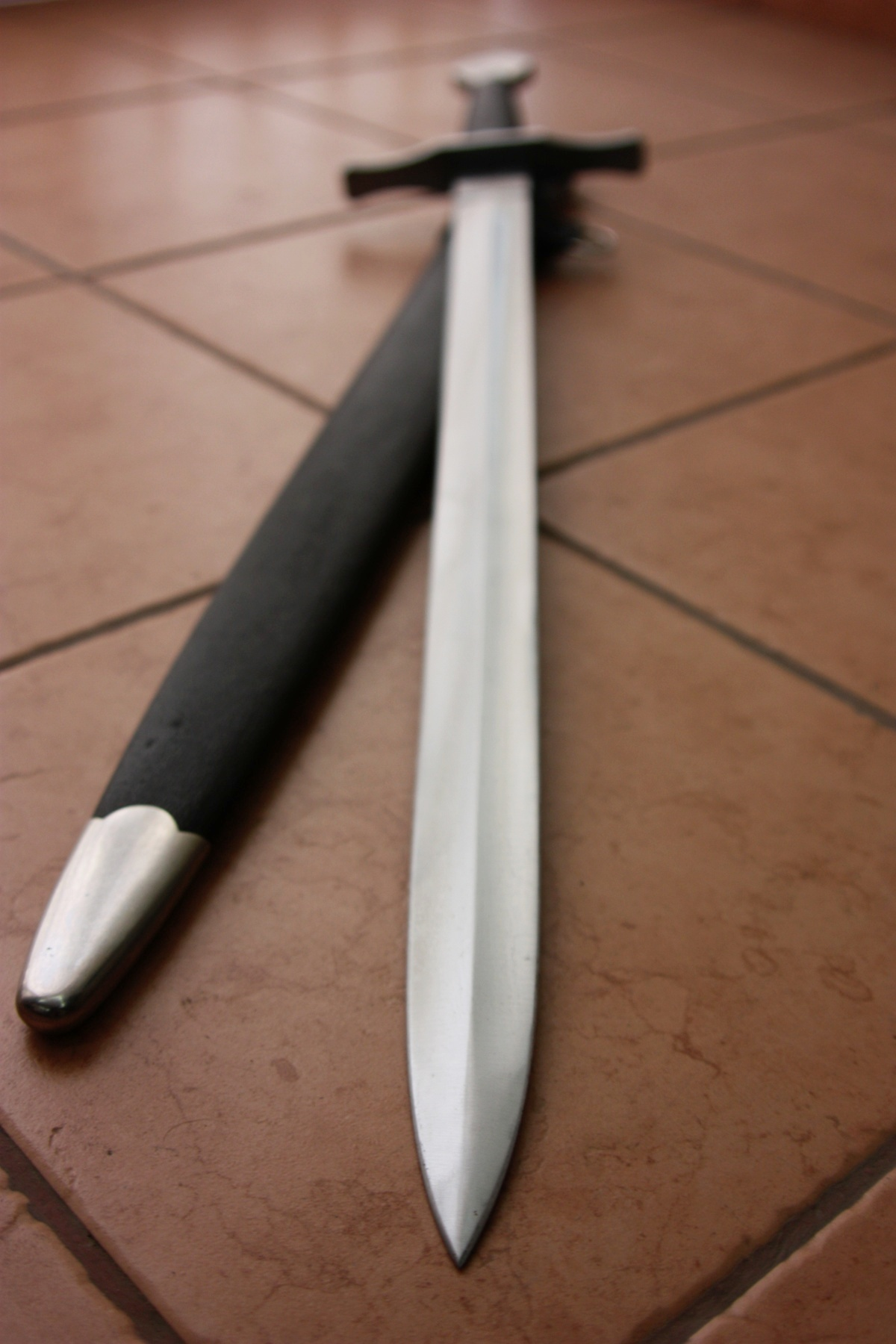
"Agincourt Sword" (SH2371)

Hanwei (Dalian Hanwei Metal Co. Ltd., Chinese: 汉威金属制造 hànwēi jīnshǔ zhìzào) was a Chinese company manufacturing replica swords and other types of medieval arms and armor. The company was founded in 1990 by Chen Chao-Po (陈朝波, Western name Paul Chen, born 1955).

The company produces replicas or reconstructions of Japanese swords, Chinese swords and European swords, besides various types shorter-bladed daggers, sidearms or combat knives, other historically inspired weapons such as axes and polearms, and reconstructions of historical helmets. Their production of Japanese swords (katanas) ranges from inexpensive swords made from differentially hardened spring steel ("Practical" series) to more elaborate production methods approximating traditional hand-forged folded steel blades starting from powder steel. The "L6 Bainaite" series is produced based on L6 steel, by means of a heat treatment process resulting in blades exhibiting Bainite/Martensite microstructures, a process pioneered by Howard Clark of Omimi and adopted by Hanwei from c. 2012.

Chen in 1987 founded Taiwan Chengfeng Trading Co., Ltd. for the importing of custom made swords. He founded the factory in Dalian in 1990. The company was officially registered in 1993, as Dalian Luwei Metal Co., Ltd. In 1996, the company based in Dalian made reproductions of the collection of the Liaoning Provincial Museum. Hanwei enjoys considerable success among hobbyists (e.g. practitioners of Iaido and of Western martial arts). Their Dalian facility is estimated as employing about 350 people. In March 2011, the Dalian factory was destroyed by fire, leading to a drop in production until the completion of a new facility in 2014. The son of Chen Chao-Po, Chen Jiangrong (Ron Chen), born 1981, learned sword making techniques at Dalian Hanwei Metal Co., Ltd. from 2003. In 2004, he studied traditional Japanese techniques with Yoshindo Yoshihara. In 2007, he reconstructed a production method for Wootz steel. Nowadays Ron Chen has a company in Taiwan, Sakae Forge. It specialises in making high quality custom swords.

Hanwei utilizes a number of authorized dealers to reach Western consumers. Its official distributor in the United States is C.A.S. Iberia, Inc., a company based in Sale Creek, Tennessee.

Hanwei's factory shut down in December 2024.

== See also ==
- List of sword manufacturers
