= Tokyo Twilight Ghost Hunters =

2014 video game

Tokyo Twilight Ghosthunters
- European PlayStation Vita box art
- Developers: Now Production; Toybox Inc.
- Publishers: JP: Arc System Works; NA: Aksys Games; EU: NIS America; WW: PQube (Windows)
- Director: Shuho Imai
- Producer: Tomio Kanazawa
- Artist: Chinatsu Kurahana
- Writer: Shuho Imai
- Composer: The Key Project
- Series: Tokyo Majin Gakuen Denki
- Platforms: PlayStation 3, PlayStation Vita, PlayStation 4, Windows
- Release: April 10, 2014: Original version; JP: April 10, 2014; NA: March 10, 2015; PAL: March 13, 2015 Daybreak: Special Gigs; JP: November 26, 2015; NA: September 20, 2016; PAL: October 21, 2016; AU: October 28, 2016 (PS4); WW: March 17, 2017 (Windows)
- Genres: Adventure, visual novel, strategy role-playing

Tokyo Twilight Ghost Hunters (魔都紅色幽撃隊, Mato Kurenai Yūgekitai) is a 2014 visual novel produced by Toybox Inc. for the PlayStation 3 and PlayStation Vita. It was originally released in Japan by Arc System Works and was released in North America by Aksys Games and in the PAL region by NIS America in 2015. An updated version with a reworked battle system, titled Tokyo Twilight Ghost Hunters Daybreak: Special Gigs, first released in Japan in 2015 before releasing worldwide for PlayStation 3, PlayStation 4, PlayStation Vita, and Windows.

The game includes adventure game and visual novel gameplay, as well as strategy role-playing elements.

== Reception ==
=== Tokyo Twilight Ghost Hunters ===
Tokyo Twilight Ghost Hunters

Aggregate score
Aggregator	Score
Metacritic	(PS3) 64/100 (Vita) 63/100

Review scores
Publication	Score
Destructoid	(Vita) 8/10
Famitsu	(PS3) 7/10, 8/10, 8/10, 8/10
Hardcore Gamer	(Vita) 2/5
Jeuxvideo.com	(PS3) 10/20
Push Square	(PS3) 8/10
RPGamer	(Vita) 3.5/5
RPGFan	(PS3) 60%
The Digital Fix	(PS3) 6/10

The original game received "mixed" reviews on both platforms, according to the review aggregation website Metacritic. In Japan, however, Famitsu gave the PS3 and Vita versions each a score of 31 out of 40.

Hardcore Gamer criticized the lack of explanations for many of the elements of the Vita version, such as the icon-based system for responding to characters, while also praising the character animation.

Erren VanDuine of PlayStation LifeStyle also disliked the lack of in-game explanations, but gave praise in particular to the art style, character animation, backgrounds, story, and the English localization, while criticizing the role-playing segments for being too frustrating and luck-based.

=== Daybreak Special Gigs ===
Tokyo Twilight Ghost Hunters: Daybreak Special Gigs

Aggregate scores
Aggregator	Score
GameRankings	(PS4, Vita) 65% (PC) 60%
Metacritic	(PS4, Vita) 64/100

Review scores
Publication	Score
Destructoid	(Vita) 7.5/10
Hardcore Gamer	(Vita) 2.5/5
Push Square	(PS4) 7/10
RPGamer	(PS4) 3/5

The PlayStation 4 and Vita versions of Daybreak Special Gigs received "mixed" reviews according to Metacritic.
