= Tokyo Majin =

2007 Japanese anime series

- Cover art from the first volume of ADV's DVD release of Tokyo Majin

東京魔人學園剣風帖 龖 (Tokyo Majin Gakuen: Kenpuchō Tō)
- Genre: Action, horror, supernatural
- Anime television series
- Directed by: Shinji Ishihira
- Produced by: Masayoshi Matsumoto; Futoshi Nakabayashi; Fumiki Yamazaki
- Written by: Toshizo Nemoto
- Music by: Takayuki Negishi
- Studio: AIC Spirits; BeSTACK
- Licensed by: NA: Crunchyroll
- Original network: Animax
- English network: US: Chiller, Crunchyroll Channel
- Original run: January 19, 2007 – October 12, 2007
- Episodes: 26
- icon

Tokyo Majin, known in Japan as Tokyo Demon Academy: The Book of Weapons – The Ascension (東京魔人學園剣風帖龖, Tōkyō Majin Gakuen: Kenpuchō Tō), is a Japanese anime series, which premiered in Japan on the anime satellite TV network Animax. Part of the Tokyo Majin Gakuen franchise, it is loosely based on a Japan-exclusive video game series.

On June 26, 2007, ADV Films announced that it had acquired the license to the anime.) ADV distributed the series under the title of Tokyo Majin, dropping "Gakuen: Kenpuchō Tō" from the title. In 2008, the anime became one of over 30 ADV titles whose licenses were transferred to Funimation. American television network Chiller began airing the series as part of their Anime Wednesdays programming block on July 15, 2015.

== Plot ==
The nights of Tokyo are disturbed by mysterious deaths involving the 'Reborn Dead', people who disappear at night and suddenly reappear during the day as a corpse. Also, as corpses are sent to the morgue to be autopsied, they disappear again leaving signs showing that they escaped themselves.

To fight these 'Reborn Dead' and to prevent more deaths, mysterious transfer student Tatsuma Hiyuu and delinquent student Kyouichi Houraiji stay up every night to fight the demons and discover the cause. They are joined by rest of the final year students at the Magami Academy, who all have supernatural powers. They must fight not only the demons, but the powerful beings controlling them who are bent on destroying the city and the people within it.

== Characters ==
=== Main characters ===
Tatsuma Hiyuu

Tatsuma Hiyuu (緋勇 龍麻, Hiyū Tatsuma)
Voiced by: Hiro Shimono (Japanese); Brandon Hearnsberger (English)
Tatsuma is a mysterious boy who transfers to Magami Academy in his senior year of high school. He is often shown as being very silent and carefree, but he actually has more insight than the people around him. He usually hangs out with Kyouichi and helps him fight gangsters from other schools, giving him the status of the fifth most delinquent student in Magami's history. Tatsuma is probably the only one in the group who is close to Kyouichi and will often calmly tease and irritate him.
He is a highly trained fighter; he knows a person's vital points, whether or not they are fighting seriously, and if they have killed before. He is often the first to realize a threat that is approaching them and sometimes gets a strange feeling when someone near him is in danger. What adds to his mysteriousness is the fact that two months prior to enrolling in Magami High, it is revealed that he was actually sent there by his master (who said that his skills will be needed there), though none of the others know of this. Also, during a fight with Kodzunu, they both see a flashback image of four people, who bear similarities to Tatsuma's current group, during the Bakumatsu. This bothers Kodzunu; he leads Tatsuma into a trap to find out more. Once again, the two see a vision of the past. This time Kodzunu realizes that Tatsuma's ancestors had a hand in the destruction of the Kodzunu clan during the Edo period.
Tatsuma has birth marks on both of his hands (as well as both feet and his chest) which he was told by his father to treasure because it will one day be of important use. As it turns out the mark symbolizes that he is the Vessel of the Golden Dragon. His opposite is the Black Dragon. The Dragons are the only Deities to fully access the Dragon Stream to its full potential. They are compared to the Yin and Yang symbol.
Due to his handsome looks and his habit of sleeping in class, he is often called Sleeping Beauty by his homeroom teacher, Maria Alucard. He is always seen wearing a blue hoodie with his school uniform worn over it. Tatsuma dislikes regular milk, so when he was a child, his mother mixed in some strawberries, calling it 'magic'. Since then, he is often seen drinking strawberry milk. After transferring to Magami, Tatsuma lives alone in Shinjuku after traveling to Tokyo.
During the second season, it is revealed that Tatsuma is an orphan and had previously lived with his foster parents. His foster parents were killed in episode 20 of the first season by Ryuuji "Chaos" Yashiro. He is last seen fighting the Black Dragon in what appears to be China.
Combat Style: Hand-to-hand, Martial arts

Kyouichi Horaiji

Kyouichi Horaiji (蓬莱寺 京一, Hōraiji Kyōichi)
Voiced by: Masaki Kawanabe (Japanese); David Wald (English)
Kyouichi is a well-known delinquent at Magami Academy who always carries around a bokutō. He often gets into fights with gangsters from other schools. When he first encounters Tatsuma, they also engage in a fierce fight, which turns out to have been just a way of getting to know each other.
Tatsuma is the only other student who Kyouichi considers a friend. He may seem to be mean to others, but in the end, he always looks out for them and tries to protect them. This is mostly seen towards Aoi, with whom he seems exceptionally mean, but he may care for her more than he admits. It is noted that he is constantly protecting her or saving her.
Kyouichi's father was a 'samurai-for-hire' at a kabuki bar who was killed by a local gang. After the death of his father, child-Kyouichi picked up his dad's bokuto and took it upon himself to take revenge against the assailants and guard Kabukichō. However, his hot temper and immature skills nearly got him killed, but a mysterious ronin named Kyoushiro Kamui saved him. Kamui ultimately takes the child as his apprentice, becoming like a second father to Kyouichi.
Growing up on the streets of Shinjuku's Red Light district, Kyouichi is very knowledgeable of the Tokyo underworld. He was acquainted with several Chinese Taoist henchmen (before they were killed), and knows the location of a hospital which specializes in supernatural cases.
At the end of the second season, Kyouichi leaves the ruins of Tokyo with Hisui Kisaragi and wanders to search for Tatsuma's whereabouts.
Combat Style: Swordsmanship using a Bokutō
Aoi Misato (美里 葵, Misato Aoi)
Voiced by: Yui Horie (Japanese); Stephanie Wittels (English)
A girl from a rich family and the President of the Magami Academy Student Council. Aoi is a sensitive person and gets very upset when she is unable to help someone. Years ago she was unable to save her friend from a classroom fire, and this gave her a strong desire to protect people. There is a scar that she received during the fire on her lower back, though only Tatsuma knows about it. Aoi seems to harbor feelings for Tatsuma, which can be first seen in the last few episodes of the first season of the anime. Towards the end of the second season, however, she also shares an emotional moment with Kyouichi and promises to wait for him as he leaves to search for Tatsuma.
Initially her powers were purely defensive in nature, causing her to be very insecure in her ability to fight alongside her friends. Later, it is revealed she possesses the Bodhisattva Eye. It is said that her Bodhisattva Eye is capable of healing, reviving the dead, or increasing the rate at which a person ages; she can cause someone to die instantaneously of old age. After she is kidnapped by Kodzunu and forced under his spells she begins using her abilities offensively to generate powerful blasts of force and unleash her full potential.
Aoi's family emblem is similar to that of the Tokugawa clan.
Combat Style: Bodhisattva Eye, Naginata-jutsu
Komaki Sakurai (桜井 小蒔, Sakurai Komaki)
Voiced by: Satomi Arai (Japanese); Melissa Pritchett (English)
Captain of the Kyūdō Club and Aoi's best friend. Komaki is quick to defend Aoi whenever Kyouichi seems to bully her. Unlike Aoi, Komaki is aggressive towards people who get in the way or harm those she cares about. Komaki is shown to have lost a Kyūdō club friend, who became an oni in order to locate and take Komaki's shooting arm. Despite being headstrong and brave, Komaki is likely the weakest when it comes to emotions and mentality. When Tatsuma's adoptive parents were killed, Komaki was the first to break down crying, causing Aoi to comfort her. Komaki can be considered weak in that nature, as she is easily disheartened or worried.
She seems oblivious to the fact that Yuuya Daigo has a crush on her, but eventually accepts and returns his affections.
Combat Style: Kyūdō (Archery)
Yuuya Daigo (醍醐 雄矢, Daigo Yūya)
Voiced by: Katsui Taira (Japanese); Andrew Love (English)
Daigo is the captain of the Magami Academy Wrestling Club and an aspiring chef. Yuuya Daigo happens to have a crush on Komaki Sakurai and he is constantly seen cooking big meals for her; at one point Komaki gets angry at him and says that he does not truly understand how she feels, throwing his meal on the ground, greatly upsetting Daigo. Tohno then gives him a book of Komaki's favorite foods, which are mostly candy and regular convenience store foods. Komaki then accepts his next meal, along with his apology for not being considerate. At the end of the 2nd season, it seems Daigo and Komaki's relationship deepens as they are seen together in the end.
Daigo wasn't always such a considerate, humble guy. In his middle school days he resented his father so much that Daigo created a gang of thugs with his best friend, Renji Magatsu, as his lieutenant. They stole and brawled throughout the Shinjuku back streets, even clashing with Kyouichi Houraiji. It wasn't until Renji was arrested for murdering his own father that Daigo decided to clean up his act.
When Tatsuma Hiyuu first transferred to Magumi high school, Yuuya Daigo challenged him to a fight in the abandoned mansion near the school. It was disrupted by Aoi and Komaki, but ultimately gathering the students together during the disruption in the Dragon Stream. This results in each of them gaining their powers.
Daigo sometimes fights with his chain belt wrapped around his arm. Later it is revealed he is the Vessel of the White Tiger or Byakko; Daigo is the first to metamorphose into the Deity in Dai ni Maku, protecting Komaki against Renji Magatsu.
Combat Style: Hand-to-hand, Wrestling
Hisui Kisaragi (如月 翡翠, Kisaragi Hisui)
Voiced by: Eiji Sekiguchi (Japanese); Illich Guardiola (English)
An owner of an antiques shop who has business dealings with the Misato family. Hisui Kisaragi has been close to Aoi since the two were children, and he seems to harbor feelings for her. He received a charm bracelet from Aoi when they were younger, which he now holds in a pouch around his neck. He also promised that he will always protect her no matter what; thus he is very loyal to Aoi and properly calls her Aoi-sama. He is revealed to be a member of a family that has killed demons since the days of the Tokugawa shogunate. He fills the group in about demons and other phenomena that are happening around the city. Later, it is revealed that his family also has the duty of killing the person who possesses the Bodhisattva Eye (Aoi). Due to his feelings for her, he cannot bring himself to complete this task.
Kisaragi is the Vessel of the Black Tortoise, or Genbu. At the end of season two he joins Kyouichi in looking for Tatsuma.
Combat Style: Ninjutsu, Throwing Kunai, Shinto spells/talismans

=== Enemies ===
Tendo Kozunu (九角 天童, Kozunu Tendō)
Voiced by: Anri Katsu (Japanese); Vic Mignogna (English)
A young man with superhuman abilities who is able to transform humans into ogres and demons. A secretive and malicious person, he is responsible for bringing disorder to the Dragon Stream, causing demons to rise in the mundane realm.
Images of when his mother killed herself still haunt him, and he is often shown in a sympathetic light. It is revealed his mother was a descendant of the Kozunu (or phonetic Kodzunu) bloodline, a clan which revolted against the Shogunate when the Shogunate used force to try and take a girl with the Bodhisattva Eye from their family. The clan ultimately lost, and those that survived went into hiding. In modern time, it was discovered by Kodzunu's father's family that his mother was actually a descendant of the Kodzunu, which led them to lock her away. Wanting revenge for his mother's long suffering and suicide, he took an offer from a mysterious man named Munetaka Yagyuu who granted him power. He then slaughtered his family. To avenge his mother, he set out to destroy everything.
Tendou especially grew a strong hatred for Tatsuma Hiyuu, blaming his ancestors for the destruction of the Kodzunu clan, which ultimately led to the unfair death of his mother. His overall goal is to gather the 10 Sacred Treasures to revive the Kidou-shuu and find the Bodhisattva Eye. Eventually he manipulates Aoi Misato, using her Bodhisattva powers to bring back his ancestors in an attempt to destroy all humans. He ultimately failed and, before Tatsuma could save him, Yagyuu had him sucked into the underworld.
Marie Claire (マリィ・クレア, Marii Kurea)
Voiced by: Kana Ueda (Japanese); Serena Varghese (English)
A mystifying 15-year-old girl with the ability to manipulate fire. Marie Claire carries a black cat named Mephisto, and is always by Kodzunu's side, but not really as his ally; she was sent by her master, Munetaka Yagyuu, to observe him and act as a messenger. Kodzunu commented that she is a doll that obeys to her master. When the temperamental child gets angry, bolts come out of her arms and forehead, and she starts to cry and drool greenish fluid as her face contorts. She then releases a devastating blast that destroys her surroundings. In the end, she was betrayed by Yagyuu and was sucked into the underworld.
Claire returns in the second season, seeking revenge against Tatsuma Hiyuu. Some of her elusive past is revealed, where she was a student at the Rozenkreuz Academy and subjected to experiments because of her pyrokinesis; Marie Claire caused the school science wing to explode and escaped into a snowstorm - only to be "rescued" by Yagyuu. Mephisto is his familiar, a gift to the girl as well as his eyes on her. However, the now lonely little girl falls in love with Tatsuma, and constantly talks about their future together (causing Mephisto to vanish).
She is the Vessel of the Vermilion Bird or Suzaku. At the end of season two she is blind and weak. She is last seen collapsing, possibly dead, as a side effect of containing the power of the Vermilion Bird.
Ryouichi Karasu (唐栖 亮一)
Voiced by: Daisuke Sakaguchi (Japanese); Greg Ayres (English)
The former leader, guitar player, and song writer of the indie band CROW. He is very shy and withdrawn, and his only friend has been Raito Umon (vocal for CROW). When Raito started disregarding Ryouichi's feelings in favor of including the other two band members of CROW (most notably changing lyrics to a particularly personal song by Ryouichi), Ryouichi snaps and murders the other band members before disappearing. Raito finds Ryouichi when the Dragon Stream breaks, giving them both supernatural powers.
Again, Ryouichi disappears, seemingly unaware of his new powers. He was later awakened to these powers through the Dark Arts by Tendou Kodzunu, which he used to terrorize the city. As his last name would suggest, Ryouichi Karasu can control flocks of crows. He is later defeated by the Magami kids in an effort to protect the city, as well as his best friend Raito. Unable to contain the Dark Arts, Ryouichi transforms into a crow-like demon. Inevitably he goes on a rampage before being killed by Kodzunu, who no longer needed him.
Reiji Sagaya (嵯峨野麗司)
Voiced by: Yoshimitsu Shimoyama (Japanese); Chris Patton (English)
Aoi's old classmate who was badly picked on when he was in middle school. No one ever bothered to step in to help him, but only Aoi showed him kindness. While he was feeding a stray dog he adopted (named Chibi), Aoi arrived to help care for dog and befriend Reiji. The bullies that picked on him were angered at the fact he talked to the popular Aoi, thus deciding to kill Chibi in front of Reiji. Roughly three years later, while playing the "Chaos Game", Reiji is sought out by Kodzunu, who gave him the power to control the dream realm. He then used this power to take revenge against the people who harassed and abused him. Finally, he then tried to use this power to capture and keep Aoi, but fails when her friends came to her rescue.
Aoi later helped to clear the darkness in his heart. He fell into a coma immediately after the fight. Later, he woke up and used his psychic powers to help lead the Magami kids to Aoi after she was kidnapped by Kodzunu. In the 2nd season, Reiji has stayed at the Sakuragaoka Clinic and learns to control his own power, as well as heal others. He quickly falls in love with Nurse Maiko Takamizawa.
Sera Rikudou (六道 世羅, Rokudō Sera)
Voiced by: Saori Seto (Japanese); Maggie Flecknoe (English)
A second year high school student who had the ability to control wire-like objects coming out of slashes on her wrists. These garrote-like wires could powerfully slice any mundane object such as buildings and people, and Sera was apathetic about using them to kill. For unknown reasons, she wanders Shinjuku as if lost, and does not speak (although she is not mute). She later used up too much energy and was on the verge of death. Aoi saved her by unknowingly healing her wounds.
With apparently no memory and no longer an enemy to their "cause", Sera is left to wander freely. In the 2nd season, she has found a home with the homeless leaving along the river, and is primarily seen with Alan Claude, hinting at a relationship. Sera Rikudou dies protecting the group of homeless men when Tokyo collapses.
Yagyuu Munetaka (柳生宗崇)
Voiced by: Shouto Kashii (Japanese); Charles C. Campbell (English)
A mysterious man on a motorbike. He uses his servant, Marie Claire, as an observer and messenger between himself and Kodzunu. He was also revealed to have been the one who gave Kodzunu powers. He is the primary antagonist of the series, but only appears in the latter half of the second season, where he razes Tokyo and possesses Ryuuji (Chaos) in order to obtain the power of the Black Dragon. One of the most powerful magicians, Yagyuu can absorb any damage and reflect it back on the user. He is also very proficient in sword combat and martial arts as he managed to best Raito, Kyouichi, Tatsuma, Kureha Mibu and Ukon Yatsurugi.
Munetaka Yagyuu was alive during the Bakumatsu, helping Tendou Kodzunu's ancestors during the rise of the Kidou-shuu. He lived to face Tatsuma Hiyuu's father, Genma, who sacrificed himself so that Ryuuzan Arai, Tougo Narutaki, Doushin Narasaki, and Kyoushiro Kamui could seal him and his devastating powers. And by the time Tatsuma Hiyuu was in middle school, Munetaka Yagyuu broke free of his seal and began using his Dark Arts once more to serve his own purposes.

=== Others ===
Kyoko Touno (遠野 杏子, Touno Kyoko)
Voiced by: Sayaka Narita (Japanese); Brittney Karbowski (English)
A member of the Newspaper Club at Magami Academy whom Kyouichi labels a stalker. Goes by the nickname "Anko". A curious and determined girl, Kyoko is always out to get the scoop on Tatsuma and his group's actions. Sensing that the main characters may be hiding something, she tails them and witnesses them using their "powers". She was overwhelmed by the fact that someone was murdered during their fight with Ryouichi Karasu and locked herself in her room, refusing to go anywhere. After some persuasion by Aoi, she reconciles with the main characters. She often helps them by providing information regarding the incidents happening around the city. She seems to have extensive information of everything and good research skills. It is shown towards the end of the second season that she has a crush on Kyouichi.
Raito Umon (雨紋 雷人, Umon Raito)
Voiced by: Go Shinomiya (Japanese); Jason Douglas (English)
The vocalist of the rock band CROW. He has the ability to manipulate lightning and electricity, as well as the ability to use a form of spell casting (accompanied by chanting and symbols). He is an extremely skilled fighter, as he was able to defeat Kyouichi, Daigo and Komaki during their first meeting.
Combat Style: Spear melee, Electrical manipulation, Spell-casting
Maiko Takamizawa (高見沢 舞子, Takamizawa Maiko)
Voiced by: Kyoko Hikami (Japanese); Melissa Davis (English)
A nurse who works at Sakuragaoka Clinic. Although a bit of an airhead, she has the ability to see Yūrei. Maiko also has an intense empathy and compassion which allow her to connect with and soothe the psychologically damaged. She has an affinity for animals, and is often seem caring for stray pets. Because she is able to see (and ultimately heal) the spirit of Reiji Sagaya's dog, Maiko proves a true help during the Dream World encounter. When he recovers, Reiji develops a crush on her, and the two are eventually seen as a couple, planning their future.
Maiko admires Takako Iwayama, aspiring to be as great as the doctor. A picture Maiko is seen studying seems to show that there is some relationship between Doctor Iwayama and Teacher Inugami, the picture seeming to imply he was some sort of father figure to Iwayama.
Combat Style: Non offensive, Intense empathy
Morihito Inugami (犬神 杜人, Inugami Morihito)
Voiced by: Tomohiro Tsuboi (Japanese); John Gremillion (English)
A teacher at Magami Academy, he is also Kyoko Tohno's homeroom teacher. He is often seen feeding rabbits in hutches in the school compound. Laid back and emotionless, he is not much of teacher since he never attends meetings. He seems to know about the actual events that are happening around the city. He is actually an Inugami (literally a Dog-God or Dog-Spirit), raised during the Edo period by the creator of Magami Academy to guard the old school grounds.
Maria Alucard (マリア・アルカード, Maria Arukādo)
Voiced by: Yuki Masuda (Japanese); Robin Terry (English)
Tatsuma, Kyouichi and Aoi's homeroom teacher. She can be very childish as a teacher, often screaming at the students and throwing stuff at them. She is often annoyed by Kyouichi, who calls her Maria-chan and always comes up with excuses to skip class. Though her attitude does not show it, she cares deeply for the safety of her students. She rides a motorcycle to school everyday and often speaks in English. She is, in reality, an Ogre. She reveals towards the end of the second season that she had planned to harm humans, but the conflict seemed to have caused a change of heart and she now professes to want to protect and stay with humans, especially her students.
Yukino Oribe (雪乃 織部)
Voiced by: Michiru Yamazaki (Japanese); Kara Greenberg (English)
One of two shrine maidens that are friends of Komaki. They later come to the aid of the main characters when they are forced to fight against a possessed Aoi. She, along with Hinano, appears to dislike men; she becomes very angry at Kyouichi when he first meets them. During the fight against Aoi, Yukino, Hinano, and Raito were able to combine their powers to perform what appeared to be a teleportation spell.
Combat Style: Naginata-jutsu, Spell casting
Hinano Oribe (雛乃 織部)
Voiced by: Ryoko Ono (Japanese); Maggie Flecknoe (English)
The second of two shrine maidens that are friends of Komaki. They later come to the aid of the main characters when they are forced to fight against a possessed Aoi. She appears to be very shy around men; she hides behind Yukino when Kyouichi first meets them.
Combat Style: Kyūdō, Spell casting
Takako Iwayama (岩山たか子, Iwayama Takako)
Voiced by: Yōko Sōmi (Japanese); Christine Auten (English)
The doctor from Sakuragaoka Central Hospital. She has a healing ability allowing her to treat patients wounded by demonic powers. She treats those who are injured during the battle against Kodzunu. She knows Kyouichi from a very young age, as she said that he used to cry to her when he was young. Kyouichi doesn't like her as she tends to embarrass him in front of others.
Combat Style: Kekkai, Purification of the dead
Ryuuzan Arai (新井龍山, Arai Ryūzan)
Voiced by: Ikyuu Juku (Japanese); Christopher Ayres (English)
A fengshui master. The Oribe sisters are seen reporting to him. He knows about the history of Kodzunu's family and about the power of Aoi. Referred to as "Mr. Eyebrows" by Tendou Kodzunu. He appeared with Doushin Narasaki (楢崎道心), fighting Tendou in episode one.
Sayo Hirasaka (比良坂紗夜, Hirasaka Sayo)
Voiced by: Kozue Yoshizumi (Japanese); Serena Varghese (English)
Second year student from Sakurajou High who was killed in the incident involving Ryouichi. Kodzunu revived her temporarily in order to make her lead Tatsuma into a trap. In exchange, Kodzunu had promised her that he would revive her parents, allowing her to live a normal life again. After leading Tatsuma into the trap, Kodzunu revealed that he was lying to her. In the end, before she dies again, she rescues Tatsuma from Kodzunu's trap.
Alan Claude (アラン·クロード, Arren Kuraudo)
Voiced by: Shuuhei Sakaguchi (Japanese); Josh Grelle (English)
A mysterious delinquent who appears early in the second season. He doesn't seem too important, but is aware of the events going on around the city. He is close to Sera Rikudou and is the Vessel of the Azure Dragon or Seiryuu. At the end of season two events he is last seen by Sera's grave and appears to be ill, possibly a side effect of being a vessel as mentioned by Ryuuzan Arai.
Ryuuji Yashiro / Chaos (耶之路龍治)
Voiced by: Hiroaki Miura (Japanese); Blake Shepard (English)
A teenager who appears in the last episode of the first season. He is the second season's first antagonist. He can control people through a cellphone game that was played by Reiji Sagaya. Through the cellphone game, he sent a possessed person to kill Tatsuma's foster-parents. He is the Yin of the Golden Dragon and is possessed by Yagyuu at the end of the second season who then uses his powers.

== Anime ==
=== Season 1 ===
The first season, Tokyo Majin Gakuen Kenpuchō: Tō (東京魔人學園剣風帖 龖?, lit., "Tokyo Demon Academy Sword Wind Book: Flight of the Dragon") originally aired on January 19, 2007, and ended on April 20, 2007. All of the episodes in the season are called the 'Dark Arts Chapters' (外法編 Gehou-hen).

In the nights of Tokyo, mysterious deaths involving the 'Reborn Dead' occur. The mysterious transfer student, Tatsuma Hiyuu, and delinquent student, Kyouichi Houraiji, fight the demons and attempt to discover the cause. Along with the other students at the Magami Academy in Shinjuku who all have supernatural powers, they fight the vengeful Tendo Kozunu who has unleashed a long-dead evil, bringing disorder to the Dragon Stream and threatening destruction of the city.

=== Season 2 ===
A second season, titled Tokyo Majin Gakuen Kenpuchō: Tō Dai Ni Maku (東京魔人學園剣風帖 龖 第弐幕?, lit., "Tokyo Demon Academy Sword Wind Book: Flight of the Dragon Second Act") originally aired on July 27, 2007, to October 12, 2007. Its first five episodes are called the 'Martial Fist Chapters' (拳武編 Kenbu-hen), its next five episodes are called the 'Stars of Fate Chapters' (宿星編 Shukusei-hen), and the last two episodes are called 'Extra Chapters' (番外編 Bangai-hen). The 'Extra' episodes do not run in the chronological timeline of the story, but are flashbacks and fillers.

The students at the Magami Academy look forward to their graduation, but the underground assassin group known as the Twelve Heavenly Generals of the Martial Fist begin to move against those protecting the city from demons. The students discover that the Martial Fist have been duped by the evil Yagyuu Munetaka who has manipulated them. Together with the Martial Fist, the Magami students led by Tatsuma Hiyuu, risk their lives to defeat Yagyuu who is more powerful than Tendo Kozunu whom he had used as his pawn.

== Themes ==
Opening themes
"0:00 a.m." by ACID (first season + episodes 1–5 and 11 of second season)
"Prayer" by ACID (second season: episodes 6–9)
Closing theme
"Hanafubuki" ("花吹雪") by ACID
Insert songs
"Growing Up" by ACID
"15 sai -fifteen-" ("15才-fifteen-") by ACID
"The Four Seasons-Winter, Violin Concerto" by Antonio Vivaldi
