= Yoshindo Yoshihara =

Japanese swordsmith based in Tokyo

Yoshindo Yoshihara (1943) is a Japanese swordsmith based in Tokyo. His family has made swords for ten generations, and he himself learned the art from his grandfather, Yoshihara Kuniie. Yoshindo himself gained his licence as a smith in 1965.

Yoshihara uses traditional techniques in his work, and uses tamahagane steel. Until 1970 he produced swords primarily in the Soshu tradition of Masamune, but switched in the 1970s to creating swords in the Bizen style.

Yoshihara has trained nine apprentices, including his son Yoshikazu who was to take over the business, but his son died unexpectedly.
