= Tokyo Majin Gakuen: Kenpūchō =

1998 video game

- Developer(s): Shout! Design Works
- Publisher(s): Asmik Ace; Marvelous Entertainment (DS)
- Director(s): Shuuhou Imai
- Series: Tokyo Majin Gakuen
- Platform(s): PlayStation, Nintendo DS
- Release: PlayStation: JP: June 18, 1998; Nintendo DS: JP: August 21, 2008; PlayStation Network: JP: March 28, 2012

Tokyo Majin Gakuen: Kenpūchō (東京魔人學園剣風帖, lit. "Tokyo Wizard Academy: Blade Gale Book") is a game released for the PlayStation on June 18, 1998, and later remade for the Nintendo DS. It is the first entry in the Tokyo Majin Gakuen franchise, and the work around which the Jin no Shō (人之章, lit. "Chapter of Mankind") setting is based. Though it is sometimes referred to as "Tokyo Majin Gakuen: Ken Kaze Tobari" in English sources, this is a mistransliteration confusing an on'yomi word with its kun'yomi reading.

== Gameplay ==
Kenpūchō consists of extensive interactive visual novel-like sequences between characters and conventional tactical role-playing game battles where a team of students battle enemies in isometric-view action. The game includes limited voice acting.

== Successors ==
A number of works that build directly on Kenpūchō have been released.

=== Tokyo Majin Gakuen: Oboro-Kitan ===
A fan disc for the game, Tokyo Majin Gakuen: Oboro-Kitan (東京魔人學園朧綺譚, lit. "Tokyo Wizard Academy: Hazy Beautiful Tales"), was released on April 12, 1999. Among other things, it contains endings for characters who didn't receive one in the original game, a set of scenarios that detail the protagonist's story before transferring schools, battle-focused challenges, quizzes, and a feature that allows you to freely control your friendship levels with characters in Kenpūchō. On July 13, 2000, a value pack featuring both Kenpūchō and Oboro-Kitan was released under the name Tokyo Majin Gakuen: Kenpūchō Emaki (東京魔人學園剣風帖繪巻, lit. "Tokyo Wizard Academy: Blade Gale Book Picture Scroll").

=== Nintendo DS Remake ===
To celebrate the game's 10-year anniversary, on August 21, 2008, the game received a Nintendo DS remake under the same title, including the content from the fan disc. Early preorders of the re-release included a pair of bonus Tokyo Majin Gakuen chopsticks that were given out in 30% ratio.
