= Code Shifter =

2020 video game

- Nintendo Switch cover art, featuring characters in the game, from left to right, Hudson, Stella, Rudy, Greig (above), and Mozzie (below)
- Developer: Arc System Works (Note: Additional development by Land Ho! for the Microsoft Windows version.)
- Publisher: Arc System Works
- Platforms: Nintendo Switch; PlayStation 4 Windows; Xbox One
- Release: PlayStation 4, Windows, Xbox One: WW: January 30, 2020; Switch: NA: January 29, 2020; EU: January 30, 2020
- Genres: Action, platform
- Modes: Single-player, multiplayer

Code Shifter is a 2020 action-platform game developed and published by Arc System Works. The game was released worldwide on January 30, 2020, for Microsoft Windows, PlayStation 4, and Xbox One. It was released on January 29, 2020, in North America, and a day later in Europe, for the Nintendo Switch.

== Plot ==
The story takes place in a video game development studio named Awesome Rainbow Corp., with initials spelling 'ARC', referencing the developers of the game. The player controls Stella, a video game developer working for said studio. Stella is currently developing a new fighting game. As Stella is about to finish developing the game, she discovers newly-found glitches in the game. Stella develops a debug program called Code Shifter. The player sends Stella's debugger avatar, Sera, into various files through Code Shifter to combat flaws that appear as platforming stages in order to fix the glitches in Stella's game. The goal is to eliminate all glitches before the game's release date arrives.

== Gameplay ==
A screenshot from the game, as Sera

The player controls control Sera, Stella's debugger avatar, inside her new fighting game, to combat flaws and fix glitches in the game. The game appears as an action side-scrolling video game. In these stages, the player finds data on other fighters (from Arc System Works' other works), which is used to turn Sera into 2D 8-bit versions of them. The game also has a 'Colorful Fighters' game mode featuring a brawler mini-game that allows up to 4 players to fight against each other. After every stage, the player is allowed to roam around the studio as Stella. Here, the player can talk to other developers which appear as non-player characters.

A screenshot from the game, featuring all 30 playable characters, with Sol Badguy selected as Player 1

=== Characters ===
The game uses 30 characters from 13 of Arc System Works' other works, consisting of:

- Birthdays the Beginning
- BlazBlue
- Damascus Gear: Operation Tokyo
- Double Dragon
- Guilty Gear
- Inferno Climber
- Jake Hunter
- Kunio-kun
- Of Mice and Sand
- Prism of Eyes
- River City Girls
- Stay Cool, Kobayashi-San!: A River City Ransom Story
- Wizard's Symphony

The game also has 70 characters from Arc System Works' other works, appearing as non-player characters.

== Development ==
The game was first announced at the start of January 2020, with a confirmed release in the first quarter of 2020.

== Reception ==
Reception

Aggregate scores
Aggregator	Score
Metacritic	NS: 55/100
OpenCritic	19% recommend

Review scores
Publication	Score
4Players	5/10
Destructoid	5/10
IGN	6/10
Nintendo Life	5/10
PCMag	(NS)

The Nintendo Switch version of Code Shifter received "mixed or average" reviews according to review aggregation website Metacritic. The game also received a 19% critic recommendation average from review aggregation website OpenCritic.

A few critics stated that the levels were dully or poorly staged, condemning the repetition of designs and backgrounds. Many critics compared the Nintendo Switch version of Code Shifter to another Nintendo Switch game, namely Super Smash Bros. Ultimate. One critic compares the development studio in the game to two animated series, namely 6teen and Total Drama Island.

A few critics criticized the 'Colorful Fighter' game mode, stating that it has "rigid controls and stiff movement", one found it "boring", whereas one critic stated that it was "funky" and "turbulent". Matthias Schmid for 4Players complemented the absence of microtransactions within the game.

Many critics also condemn the story of the game, stating that it is "poorly written" and "overbearing". Will Greenwald for PCMag criticized the mechanics of the game, stating that it is "poor." Many critics condemn the way Arc System Works' characters have been used in Code Shifter, stating that the game "does nothing really interesting with them" and that it "feels like a massively missed opportunity".
