= Tantei Jingūji Saburō: Shinjuku Chūō Kōen Satsujin Jiken =

1987 video game

- Box art by Katsuya Terada
- Developer: Data East
- Series: Jake Hunter
- Platform: Famicom Disk System
- Release: JP: March 24, 1987
- Genre: Adventure

Tantei Jingūji Saburō: Shinjuku Chūō Kōen Satsujin Jiken (Note: Japanese: 探偵神宮寺三郎新宿中央公園殺人事件; lit. Detective Saburo Jinguji: Shinjuku Central Park Murder Case) is a 1987 adventure video game developed and published by Data East for the Famicom Disk System. It is the first of fhe Jake Hunter series.

Tantei Jingūji Saburō: Shinjuku Chūō Kōen Satsujin Jiken received a sequel titled Tantei Jingūji Saburō: Yokohama-kō Renzoku Satsujin Jiken (1988), which follows the narrative set-up by this game. The 1987 game has since been re-released in compilations, digital forms and remade for feature phones and the Nintendo DS in the 2000s.

== Gameplay ==
A writer for Famitsu described the game in the "command-select" adventure game, a popular genre at the time with other similar games like The Portopia Serial Murder Case and Sanma no Meitantei.

The game also features and over-head map for traversing locations, similar to the ones seen in role-playing games of the era.

== Plot ==
Tantei Jingūji Saburō: Shinjuku Chūō Kōen Satsujin Jiken begins with the discovery of the strangled body of hostess Momoko Takada. With no witnesses to the murder, Inspector Kumano asks his friend Jinguji Saburo, who runs a detective agency in Shinjuku's Kabukichō district, to take the case. As the investigation continues, it is revealed that Momoko was on good terms with a wealthy man and that the bar manager owed her money, as other suspects emerge.

== Development ==
The artwork for the game cover was by Katsuya Terada. Initially, Toshio Nishiuchi was creating artwork for the game, but his style did not match the Hardboiled style, leading Nishiuchi to suggest Terada for the job. At the time, Terada said he was a fan of video games, but not what he'd describe as an "avid gamer", saying he did not even own Nintendo's console at that point.

== Release and reception ==
Reception

Review scores
| Publication | Score |
|---|---|
| Famicom Hisshoubon | 4/5, 3/5 |
| Famicom Tsūshin | 6/10, 6/10, 8/10, 6/10 |

Tantei Jingūji Saburō: Yokohama-kō Renzoku Satsujin Jiken was released in Japan for the Famicom Disk System on March 24, 1987. It was re-released as part of the video game compilation Detective Jinguji Saburo Early Collection for the PlayStation in 1999.

In Famicom Tsūshin, four reviewers all complimented the graphics with one calling them dramatic and mature and another saying it was the most charming part of the game, with is illustrations being reminiscent of the work of manga artist Jiro Taniguchi. Two reviewers dismissed the overhead map screen for traversing the world, which resembled a Dragon Quest game, with one reviewer saying it was unintentionally funny in contrast to the graphics of the other parts in the game.

In Famicom Hisshoubon, the first review complimented the game's narrative quality and flashy style and hoped it would not get overlooked with the looming popularity of Sanma no Meitantei. A second reviewer said that most mystery stories, the usual problem is that the characters are all unique but lack depth.

== Legacy ==
Tantei Jingūji Saburō: Shinjuku Chūō Kōen Satsujin Jiken was the first installment in the Tantei Jinguji Saburo video game series. It was following by Tantei Jingūji Saburō: Yokohama-kō Renzoku Satsujin Jiken (1988) which continues the plot of the first game. The series has gone through several developers and publishers, with new games in the series still being released by 2024.

No games in the Tantei Jingūji Saburō series would be released commercially with an English translation until the release of Capcom's Phoenix Wright: Ace Attorney in 2005 in the United States. Capcom game's success led to similar Japanese mystery-themed games being released in English markets, with Jake Hunter: Detective Chronicles (2008) to be the first game in the Tantei Jingūji Saburō series to receive an English release. Tantei Jingūji Saburō: Shinjuku Chūō Kōen Satsujin Jiken was remade for feature phones as an app through EZWeb and released in the Japanese market in 2005. The game was re-made for the Nintendo DS as Tantei Jingūji Saburō DS Inishie No Kioku (2007) which Famitsu described as having significantly changed content.

== See also ==
- List of Data East games
- List of Famicom Disk System games
- Video games in Japan
