= Sanma no Meitantei =

1987 video game

- Developer: Namco
- Publisher: Namco
- Platform: Family Computer
- Release: JP: 2 April 1987
- Genre: Adventure

Sanma no Meitantei (Note: Japanese: さんまの名探偵; lit. Great Detective Sanma) is a 1987 adventure game made by Namco for the Family Computer (Famicom). The game is a comedic murder mystery featuring real-world comedians from Japan such as Sanma Akashiya. In the game, the players teams up with Sanma to solve a murder and diamond heist that occurred at the president of Yoshimoto Kogyo's home.

On Sanma no Meitantei release, it topped the sales charts for Famicom games in Famicom Hisshoubon. The game received positive reviews in Famicom Hisshoubo and Famicom Tsūshin. Hardcore Gaming 101 said that the game had "something of a cult reputation" in Japan, leading to it being referenced in later games such as Super Mario RPG (1996) and Atsushi no Meitantei (2022).

== Plot ==
In Sanma no Meitantei is set in the Kansai region of Japan. The player assumes the role of a detective to solve the mystery of the diamond theft and murder of Bunchin Katsura, a rakugoka comedian, that took place at the president of Yoshimoto Kogyo's home. He is assisted by his partner, comedian Sanma Akashiya. The goal is to find the murderer among the many culprits who were Yoshimoto comedians of the era.

There are multiple endings to the story, and only one where the player captures the real culprit.

== Gameplay ==
Gameplay featuring Sanma Akashiya at the bottom of the screen. Unlike other similar adventure games of the time, Sanma no Meitantei features graphical elements for its menu selection of actions.

Famitsu described the game as a "command-input adventure" styled-game, similar to other popular games of the era, such as The Portopia Serial Murder Case or Tantei Jingūji Saburō: Shinjuku Chūō Kōen Satsujin Jiken which were popular at in the late 1980s in Japan. The game allows the player to select from a menu of commands. Instead of text-based commands, the commands are presented through icons. Objects on display on the screen can be investigated through a cursor shaped like a crab.

Some portions of the game features action sequences, such as avoiding falling plates to grab a falling notebook or having to continually hit the buttons on the controller to win a boat race, or an optional mini-game that is a parody of Galaxian called Crabaxian.

== Production ==
Sanma no Meitantei was developed by Namco. The game features several 1980s comedians from Japan's Yoshimoto Kogyo.

One of the lead developers of the game said they focused on making the game very user-friendly as they wanted many people to play it. While developing the game, he watched several television shows that Sanma appeared in and read anything he could about him. The characters in the game speak in a Kansai dialect, with the developer saying he tried to have the language in the game be at a level that everyone would understand.

== Release and reception ==
Reception

Review scores
Publication	Score
Famicom Hisshoubon	4/5, 4.5/5
Famicom Tsūshin	8/10, 9/10, 9/10, 8/10

Sanma no Meitantei was released on April 2, 1987 for the Family Computer. From April 1 to April 15, Famicom Hisshoubon reported that Sanma no Meitantei was the highest-selling Famicom game "by a long shot". An English fan translation was released in 2018.

In Famicom Tsūshin, the four reviewers complimented the game with one praising its unrepetitive nature and another saying that as a rare comedy-themed adventure game, it brought fresh air to the genre. One reviewer specifically praised all the small touches made within the game that made it truly great. Reviewers in Famicom Hisshoubon complimented the use of Yoshimoto comedians, with one reviewer saying it was the best Famicom adventure game ever made, despite compiling the best parts of previous efforts. Sanma no Meitantei was the third-highest rated game of 1987 in Famicom Tsūshin, only being topped by Dragon Quest II and Zelda II: The Adventure of Link.

In retrospective reviews, In Game Criticism then compared to games based on murder mysteries such as the Tantei Jingūji Saburō series were often considered dark and serious, and the comedic tone of the game opened up more casual gamers to adventure games. The review concluded that it was an ambitious work that remained entertaining today. A reviewer in Hardcore Gaming 101 described it as an "interesting footnote in the history of Japanese adventure games" complimenting the graphics and finding the music good, but too short making it repetitive. They concluded that it was not a game for everyone as it was occasionally too impenetrable at times to know how to progress.

== Legacy ==
Hardcore Gaming 101 said that it had "something of a cult reputation" in Japan. The game was voted by readers of Weekly Famitsu in 2003 as being among their favourite Famicom games, being listed in the 20th spot. Famitsu also polled their audience on their website in 2003 on which Namco games were their favourite. Sanma no Meitantei placed 7th in the poll. Discussing the game at a panel about older Family Computer games in 2023, the panelists found the game to still be fun with one of them saying it remained one of the few successful games to feature celebrities.

Sanma Akashiya would continue to be connected with other Nintendo products in the future. In the Japanese-language version of Super Mario RPG (1996), a character refers to a phrase Sanma uses in the game when examining objects. Sanma Akashiya would also later become the spokesperson for Nintendo's Mii Channel and for the game Wii Sports (2006).

On December 31, 2022 the Japanese indie game publisher Phoenixx released Atsushi no Meitantei (Note: あつしの名探偵; lit. Great Detective Atsushi), which paid tribute to Sanma no Meitantei. The game features graphics similar to those of the original game and features contemporary comedians.

== See also ==
- List of Namco games
- Video games in Japan
