= Alternate Jake Hunter: Daedalus The Awakening of Golden Jazz =

2018 video game

- Steam promo art
- Developer: Neilo Inc
- Publisher: Arc System Works
- Series: Jake Hunter
- Platforms: Nintendo Switch, PlayStation 4, Windows
- Release: JP: December 13, 2018
- Genres: Adventure game, visual novel
- Mode: Single-player

Alternate Jake Hunter: Daedalus The Awakening of Golden Jazz (Note: Japanese: ダイダロス：ジ・アウェイクニング・オブ・ゴールデンジャズ; lit. Daedalus The Awakening of Golden Jazz) (stylized as Alternate Jake Hunter: DAEDALUS The Awakening of Golden Jazz) is a 2018 adventure video game developed by Neilo Inc and published by Arc System Works. It is part of the Jake Hunter series of video games and a prequel to the game Tantei Jingūji Saburō: Yume no Owari ni (Note: 探偵 神宮寺三郎 夢の終わりに; lit. Detective Saburo Jinguji: At the Dream's End) (1998). The plot involves Jinguji Saburo traveling to New York and eventually becoming the master detective he is known for being.

Daedalus The Awakening of Golden Jazz has been described as both a visual novel and an adventure game. The player solves mysteries in the game's chapters of the game by investigating crime scenes and interrogating the people around them. The game features new elements in the series, such as the ability to rotate a camera around an area in 360 degrees to observe a scene.

It was first released for the PlayStation 4, Nintendo Switch, and Windows in Japan in 2018 and received an English-language release in 2019. It received positive scores from Famitsu in Japan, but less enthusiastic reviews from IGN Japan and Adventure Gamers.

== Plot ==
The game is billed as a prequel to the game Tantei Jingūji Saburō: Yume no Owari ni (1998).

== Cast ==
- Jinguji Saburo, voiced by Yuichi Nakamura. While the character's name was anglicized to Jake Hunter in previous entries, he uses his original Japanese moniker, Jinguji Saburo, in the English version of this game.
- Yulia Marks (Yoko Misono), voiced by Ayumi Fujimura
- Abby, voiced by Aika Kobayashi

== Gameplay ==
Daedalus The Awakening of Golden Jazz has been described as both an adventure game and a visual novel. Its story is structured in chapters. In each chapter, the player solves a major case and then moves on to the next one.

The game features a new user interface not seen in previous entries in the Tantei Jingūji Saburō series. When searching for evidence or making inquiries, the player can freely look around in 360 degrees. This viewing mode can also be used during a conversation with another character. Another mode allows for unexplored areas to become clearly highlighted.

The player can also change their "stance" in the game during conversations with characters, which adjusts the tone of the player's dialogue. Different stances with different characters can allow the player a range of options, from extracting different information from them to potentially ending the game.

== Development ==
Daedalus The Awakening of Golden Jazz was in development after the release of Tantei Jingūji Saburō: Fukushū no Rondo (Note: 探偵 神宮寺三郎 復讐の輪舞; lit. Detective Saburo Jinguji: The Rondo of Revenge) (2012) and prior to the release of Jake Hunter Detective Story: Ghost of the Dusk (2017), with the latter game being directed by Kenji Sato of Arc System Works.

Writer Hirotaka Inaba, who had previously written Tantei Jingūji Saburō: Yume no Owari ni (1998), worked on this game as well. When Takaomi Kaneko of Arc System Works approached Inaba about a new Tantei Jingūji Saburō game, he initially asked if they could do a different project. Kaneko promised that the project would be different, which led them to develop plans for an overall story that would take place, which took up to around three months.

While working on that game, Inaba planned an episode set in New York in the past, but could not get it included. When working on Daedalus, he received Kaneko's permission to develop a story with this setting. He felt New York would best capture the "cool" essence that the character Jinguji has.

Kaneko felt the gameplay system of the games had not changed much since the Nintendo DS era of the series, and opted to change the look and feel of the game. Yuda described the making of the game as "extremely difficult", struggling to get the concept of "genius experience," and give the players a sense of accomplishment when finishing a case.

The game went through various title changes during development, with some titles not even referencing the Detective Jinguji Saburo name. Kaneko felt the game could be a spin-off of the series initially, but then thought it could not be, as Jinguji has not even become a detective yet.

== Release and reception ==
Reception

Review scores
Publication	Score
Adventure Gamers	3/5
Famitsu	8/10, 8/10, 8/10, 7/10
IGN	4/10

Daedalus The Awakening of Golden Jazz was released in Japan for PlayStation 4, Nintendo Switch, and PC on December 13, 2018. An English-language version with Japanese voice-acting was released by Arc System Works on May 16, 2019, for PlayStation 4, Nintendo Switch, and through Steam.

In a review from IGN's Japanese site, the reviewer said that the game was only impressive at the beginning and that often characters were seen from a distance, meaning they lacked emotional expression without the ability to see close-ups, and that the visuals of said characters were lackluster. It was also said that both the main story and the flavor text between interactions were bland.

== See also ==
- 2018 in video games

== Sources ==
=== References ===
- "いま語られる、神宮寺三郎の過去――『ダイダロス：ジ・アウェイクニング・オブ・ゴールデンジャズ』プレイレビュー" [The Story of Saburo Jinguji's Past is Now Revealed - "Daedalus: The Awakening of Golden Jazz" Play Review]. Famitsu. Archived from the original on November 29, 2018.
- "『ダイダロス：ジ・アウェイクニング・オブ・ゴールデンジャズ』制作スタッフインタビュー――"神宮寺三郎：新章"が生まれた理由" [Daedalus: The Awakening of Golden Jazz Production Staff Interview—The Reason Behind "Saburo Jinguji: New Chapter"]. Famitsu (in Japanese). December 20, 2018. Archived from the original on December 20, 2018.
- Becky (January 8, 2020). "Reviews for Alternate Jake Hunter: Daedalus – The Awakening of Golden Jazz". Adventure Gamers. Archived from the original on July 13, 2025.
- Fukuyama, Koji (December 28, 2018). "ダイダロス：ジ・アウェイクニング・オブ・ゴールデンジャズ - レビュー" [Daedalus: The Awakening of Golden Jazz - Review]. IGN Japan (in Japanese). Archived from the original on November 12, 2020.
- Romano, Sal (September 20, 2018). "Daedalus: The Awakening of Golden Jazz launches December 13 in Japan". Gematsu. Archived from the original on September 20, 2018.
- Romano, Sal (December 4, 2018). "Famitsu Review Scores: Issue 1566". Gematsu.
- Romano, Sal (March 20, 2019). "Alternate Jake Hunter: Daedalus The Awakening of Golden Jazz coming west on May 16". Gematsu.
- Yamoto, Shinichi (December 6, 2018). "お洒落でムーディーな，新たな神宮寺。「ダイダロス：ジ・アウェイクニング・オブ・ゴールデンジャズ」インプレッションをネタバレ無しでお届け" [A Stylish and Moody New Jingūji. Impressions of "Daedalus: The Awakening of Golden Jazz" Delivered Spoiler-free.]. 4gamer.net.
- Yoshida, Rampage; Ashida, Gigolo; Urara, Umezono; Uchizawa, Goro (2018). "ダイダロス：ジ・アウェイクニング・オブ・ゴールデンジャズ". Famitsu.
