= WorkJam =

WorkJam may refer to:

- WorkJam (software company), a Canadian workforce management software company founded in 2014
- WorkJam (video game company), a defunct Japanese video game publisher
