= Tantei Jingūji Saburō: Yokohama-kō Renzoku Satsujin Jiken =

1988 video game

- Famicom box art
- Developer: Data East
- Publisher: Data East
- Series: Jake Hunter
- Platform: Family Computer
- Release: JP: 26 February 1988
- Genre: Adventure
- Mode: Single-player

Tantei Jingūji Saburō: Yokohama-kō Renzoku Satsujin Jiken (Note: Japanese: 探偵 神宮寺三郎 横浜港連続殺人事件; lit. Detective Jingūji Saburō: The Yokohama Port Serial Murder Case) is a 1988 adventure video game developed and published by Data East for the Famicom. It was the second release in the Tantei Jingūji Saburō series, known as the Jake Hunter series in English territories.

On its release, it received positive reviews in Japanese video game magazines Famicom Tsūshin and Famicom Hisshoubon. It would be listed among the top ten best-selling Famicom games in Japan in April 1988, according to Famicom Tsūshin' sales charts.

The game has since been re-released in compilations, digital forms and remade for feature phones.

== Gameplay ==
Tantei Jingūji Saburō: Yokohama-kō Renzoku Satsujin Jiken is an adventure game. In the game, the player navigates menu options that allow them to investigate an area. These include options to examine someone in closer detail, look around the area, take items as evidence such as photos navigating to different areas.

== Plot ==
Detective Jingūji Saburō receives a letter from a man asking to find his fiancée Eva Christina. This leads him to Yokohama where he starts seeking out clues with his assistant Yoko Sakaishi where the detective discovers the case goes beyond searching for a missing person.

== Background and development ==
After the release of The Portopia Serial Murder Case (1985) for the Famicom, a number of adventure games for the console has increased with many similar titles released in 1988 and 1989 with strong sales numbers, with the number of titles released quickly decreasing after.

Tantei Jingūji Saburō: Yokohama-kō Renzoku Satsujin Jiken was the second installment in the Tantei Jinguji Saburo video game series, following Tantei Jingūji Saburō: Shinjuku Chūō Kōen Satsujin Jiken (Note: 探偵 神宮寺三郎 新宿中央公園殺人事件, lit. Detective Jingūji Saburō: Murder in Shinjuku Central Park) released on April 24, 1987 for the Famicom Disk System. Its narrative is a continuation of the first game.

The game is set in real-life locations such as Yokohama.

== Release ==
Tantei Jingūji Saburō: Yokohama-kō Renzoku Satsujin Jiken was released in Japan for the Famicom on February 26, 1988. Polling various Tokyo and Osaka-based retailers, Famitsu continuously listed Yokohama-kō Renzoku Satsujin Jiken as being among the top 30 selling Famicom games in Japan by late April 1988.

It was re-released as part of the video game compilation Detective Jinguji Saburo Early Collection for the PlayStation in 1999. It was remade for feature phones as an app through EZWeb and released in the Japanese market in 2005. The original game was made available for digital download on the Nintendo Wii's Virtual Console on September 2, 2008.

No games in the Tantei Jingūji Saburō series would be released commercially with an English translation until the release of Capcom's Phoenix Wright: Ace Attorney in 2005 in the United States. Capcom game's success led to similar Japanese mystery-themed games being released in English markets, with Jake Hunter: Detective Chronicles (2008) to be the first game in the Tantei Jingūji Saburō series to be receive an English release.

== Reception ==
Reception

Review scores
Publication	Score
Famicom Hisshoubon	3.5/5
Famicom Tsūshin	7/10, 7/10, 8/10, 7/10

The four reviewers of in Famicom Tsūshin all generally complimented the game. While one reviewer said they wished it were released on the Famicom Disk System. Another said it was a considerably faster-paced game by switching to the Famicom cartridge. One reviewer found the story lacking more shocking and mysterious elements early on, while another said it was all a bit cheesy, but was happy to have another story with Jinguiji again.

Reviewers in Famicom Hisshoubon compared the game to the previous title Shinjuku Chūō Kōen Satsujin Jiken, with one reviewer in Famicom Hisshoubon saying that the more frustrating elements of the last game were gone, making progress much smoother while still being appropriately difficult. The two reviewers in Famicom Hisshoubon complimented the game, writing that it was visually superior to the previous title.

One reviewer in Famicom Hisshoubon said it was one of the more exciting games in recent memory. Critic Mariko Miyashita of Famicom Tsūshin chose the game as her "Pick of the Week" on February 19, 1988 saying that along with Matsumoto Tōru no Kabushiki Hisshōgaku, both were games that can be enjoyed on a mature adult level.

== See also ==
- List of Data East games
- Video games in Japan
