= Zero4 Champ DooZy-J Type-R =

1997 video game

- Developer: Media Rings
- Publisher: Media Rings
- Director: Yutaka Kaminaga
- Series: Zero4 Champ
- Platforms: Sega Saturn, PlayStation
- Release: JP: June 20th, 1997
- Genre: Racing
- Modes: Single-player, multiplayer

Zero4 Champ DooZy-J Type-R (ゼロヨンチャンプ Doozy-J TypeR) is a 1997 touge racing game for the Sega Saturn. It was released by Media Rings exclusively in Japan as part of the Zero4 Champ series. It was released on the same day as the PlayStation version, Zero4 Champ DooZy-J; besides the name, both games are identical to each other.

== Summary ==
DooZy-J Type-R is a typical installment apart from the backgrounds being made of polygons instead of sprites.

There are also around 5 mini-bonus games.

== Reception ==
Zero4 Champ's graphics and sound design weren't well-received as the developers decided to use sprites for the cars rather than polygon models. Praise was given for its extreme car customization, a mechanic used so that the vehicles can outperform the opposition. Overall, Zero4 Champ was considered an average drag racing-style game, not an adequate arcade racer or racing simulation.
