= Theresia (video game) =

2008 video game

- North American packaging artwork featuring Leanne and Emile
- Developer: WorkJam
- Publishers: JP: Arc System Works; NA: Aksys Games
- Series: Theresia
- Platform: Nintendo DS
- Release: JP: September 11, 2008; NA: October 30, 2008
- Genres: Visual novel, adventure
- Mode: Single-player

Theresia (テレジア), known in Japan as Theresia: Dear Emile, is a psychological horror visual novel adventure game developed by WorkJam and published by Aksys Games, released exclusively for the Nintendo DS. It is one of the few DS games to receive an ESRB rating of M for "Mature" and a CERO rating of C from "ages 15 and older", and is the fifth of 11 DS games overall to be issued the former rating for a North American release. The game follows an amnesiac teenager named Leanne wandering an abandoned military installation, trying to regain her memories and escape while avoiding traps designed to kill her.

Theresia was released on September 11, 2008, in Japan and on October 30, 2008, in North America. Arc System Works acquired the rights to the series in 2017. The game is the second release of a mobile phone game series of the same name. The DS version contains a remake of the original phone title, renamed as "Dear Martel."

== Premise ==
Theresia is a psychological horror visual novel adventure game from a first-person perspective, consisting of two stories, each sharing a common background: an unnamed country, presumably under strict martial law by the time the game takes place, is engaged in a fierce and bloody war with an unspecified opposing nation. No further details are provided: the player is then thrust directly into the role of Leanne, the protagonist of the first half of the story. Upon completion of the main game, a shorter second chapter is unlocked, consisting of a remake of the series' original phone game. Featuring an unnamed protagonist, it provides a deeper insight into the overarching background narrative.

Throughout the course of the game, both characters have to explore their confinements, trying to escape and learn the details of their past, avoiding traps and coming face-to-face with personal demons and other psychological dilemmas along the way. The game makes use of the Nintendo DS touchscreen capabilities.

== Gameplay ==
Gameplay is divided into two modes: a movement mode, where the player navigates the facility and searching for different rooms, and an observational mode, in which the player investigates certain areas and solves puzzles. During the latter mode, the player may activate traps that harm the player and reduce their life bar. Only careful observation or usage of a found 2x4 can reveal them to the character to prevent harm. The player can regain lost health via the use of found elixirs.

== Plot ==
=== Dear Emile ===
Leanne, a teenage girl wakes up in a small, dim room with no memories. The only clue is the word Theresia scribbled upon a piece of paper. The first areas of the game instruct the player on the controls, set the atmosphere and introduce the survival aspect. The building is not only the sub-basement of a larger complex, but also riddled with hidden traps. Most doors are locked, barricaded, or blocked by environmental hazards. Leanne discovers she is in an underground prison facility, which stretches over several underground stories and includes waterworks, storage and torture rooms, and unknown crypts.

In the upper levels, more of the setting and Leanne's background are revealed: the country is losing the war, and the prison is part of a military installation which includes a testing laboratory, run by a woman named Maylee, who Leanne has seen in flashbacks. She also has flashbacks of a young man named Sacha and a silver-haired woman drenched in blood.

Evidence reveals that the testing was of an enemy's bioweapon, known to cause uncontrollable bleeding, high fever, madness, amnesia, and ultimately death as the body swells and turns purple. After the death of an infected, it becomes an airborne virus named Epicari. To stop Epicari from spreading, the bodies would be burned. Leanne heads toward the surface, until reaching the commander's office.

Along the way, journal entries and notes cause Leanne to have flashbacks and recover pieces of her memory. She remembers she was the sole survivor of a village destroyed in the war. Growing up at the church, she longed to talk to a young boy named Sacha, but her foster mother, Emile, made her promise never to talk to anyone but her. Sacha and Leanne exchanged letters in secret. When Emile discovered Sacha embracing Leanne, she ran at him with a knife, killing another church member who got in the way. Emile was restrained and taken to the underground part of the facility and was no longer allowed to visit Leanne.

Epicari had begun to surface, killing many people. Maylee and a group of scientists created a cure from Emile's blood, called "Theresia" after her last name. The virus continued to spread and the military moved everyone underground to their base. Sacha tried to convince Leanne to run away with him, as the two had fallen in love, but Leanne couldn't forget Emile. She asked Maylee to take her to see her mother. Emile chained Leanne and locked her in a prison cell but Leanne was happy to be with her mother again.

Eventually, the military ordered mass executions to finally stop the virus. Sacha came to release a reluctant Leanne, but was discovered by Emile. He pointed a gun at her, but she calmed him down by singing him a lullaby she often sang to an infant Leanne. She took his gun and killed him. She tried to escape with Leanne, assisted by Maylee, who had come to care for them. Emile murdered many of her own comrades to protect her daughter. Remembering this, Leanne realizes her mother really did love her.

Leanne eventually becomes infected with Epicari. Maylee gave her the vaccine, Theresia, made from her mother's blood, which gave her amnesia. Emile was the one who left her journal entries. She also set up the traps, attempting to keep Leanne safe from others, and to keep her from escaping. In the commander's office, Leanne finds her mother's body and mourns. She takes the final key needed for her escape, which her mother had seemingly been protecting. Casting aside her possessions, along with the pendant her mother had given her, Leanne escapes the facility.

Outside, she finds an abandoned infant which she resolves to take. After the credits, the camera zooms in on Leanne kneeling outside with the baby, Emile standing behind her. There is a strange noise, and the camera falls over.

=== Dear Martel ===
The game takes place sometime before the events of Dear Emile. It starts with the protagonist waking up in a room with no memories of his past.

The protagonist is unnamed. Martel was the name of his sister, who had a different father than him. After the death of their mother soon after she was born, he sent her to an orphanage ran by their grandfather. He was adopted and continued his studies. Years later, he returns to the orphanage to be a doctor and to do research. He is reunited with Martel, who has grown into a kind, beautiful young woman. The two seem to get along well. He also becomes friends with two other doctors there Franz and Maylee. The doctor becomes very happy with his new family.

The doctors unknowingly create the Epicari virus and infect the children. As the virus spreads, they request help from the government. Soldiers come, but only to forcibly take samples from the children. The orphanage is then quarantined. As more and more children die, the doctor, Franz, and Maylee struggle to find a cure. Martel buries the dead children without fear of being infected herself, and the fact that she doesn't eventually leads to the creation of the vaccine Theresia from her blood.

By this time, Franz was unknowingly infected with Epicari. He had suddenly started hiding his face, claiming he hated how he looked. One of the symptoms of the virus was the exacerbation of personal issues, but because they falsely believed the virus only affected children, they didn't realize this until it was too late. Eventually he went mad and attacked people with an axe. When his mask fell off, he killed himself by ramming his face into the axe embedded in the wall.

Though they finally managed to create the vaccine, the place was stormed by soldiers. The staff tried to tell them that they now had a cure, the soldiers were relentless and used flamethrowers to massacre all the children and many of the staff. The doctor managed to hide with Martel, but was separated from Maylee. She ultimately survived, going on to try and create more of the vaccine as shown in Dear Emile's story.

When everything was over, the doctor and Martel left their hiding places. A disheveled and slightly bloody Martel stepped on and killed an insect without realizing it. The doctor, who was unknowingly suffering from Epicari himself, snaps from this sight and strangles her. He buries her amongst the red flowers she had grown outside the orphanage. Knowing he will soon forget, the doctor leaves the notes and journal entries to remind him what he has done. He also sets up the traps and writes the messages on the wall, as a way to punish himself for what he has done.

The game ends with the protagonist obtaining the vaccine and getting back his memories. After exiting the orphanage, he desperately tries to dig up Martel's body but cannot find it. He is happened upon by Maylee, who talks with him.

== Sequel ==
A sequel to the original game, entitled Theresia II: Dear Lizst, was released in Japan for mobile phones.

It was removed from app stores in 2012 along with other versions of Theresia, when WorkJam closed down.

== Development and release ==
Theresia was developed by the Japanese company WorkJam, which was most notable for the Jake Hunter series. It was first announced on February 11, 2008, set to be published by Arc System Works in Japan. It was speculated that the game would be localized for North America upon announcement.

Western Release

Aksys Games confirmed the game would receive a North American release in a press release on July 7, 2008. Associate Marketing Manager Harry Chang noted that the female protagonist [Leanne] "loves her mom...a lot." which was perceived as "incesteous" and unusual by one publication.

The game was released on November 3, 2008.

== Reception ==
Reception

Aggregate score
Aggregator	Score
Metacritic	61/100

Review scores
Publication	Score
1Up.com	C−
Adventure Gamers	2.5/5
Famitsu	8/10, 7/10, 7/10, 6/10
GamesRadar+	2/5
IGN	7.1/10

Theresia received "mixed or average" reviews according to the review aggregation website Metacritic. Critics praised its plot, sound and cutscenes but criticized its gameplay and design flaws. In Japan, Famitsu gave it a score of one eight, two sevens, and one six, for a total of 28 out of 40.

Alex Lucard of diehardgamefan.com gave Theresia a positive review, saying that “[Theresia] features one of the best stories you’ll find in a game this year, some amazing hand drawn art, creepy puzzles, and an atmosphere second to none.” Daemon Hatfield of IGN gave it a 7.1/10 or “good” review, explaining that “Theresia offers a mature, high-concept Nintendo DS experience that, while frustrating at times, might provide adventure gamers with the fix they need.” Henry Gilbert from GamesRadar+ was very critical of the game, rating it a 4/10. He comedically noted that the best part of the game was “finally solving some annoying puzzle, putting down DS and staring at clouds.”

== See also ==
- Nine Hours, Nine Persons, Nine Doors
