= Wizard's Harmony =

1995 video game

- Developer: Arc System Works
- Publisher: Arc System Works
- Series: Wizard's Harmony
- Platforms: PlayStation, Sega Saturn
- Release: JP: December 29, 1995
- Genre: Raising sim
- Mode: Single-player

Wizard's Harmony (Note: Japanese: ウィザーズハーモニー) is a raising sim video game by Arc System Works. The game has a fantasy-setting, where the player has various apprentices and guides them in enhancing their magic abilities.

It was released for the Sega Saturn and PlayStation on December 29, 1995. It had two follow-ups: Wizard's Harmony 2 (1997) and Wizard's Harmony R (1998). Reviews in Dengeki PlayStation and Famicom Tsūshin found that there was plenty of variety in the game, it suffered from poor voice acting and unclear goals in the tasks to reach specific endings.

== Gameplay ==
Reviewers in Famicom Tsūshin described Wizard's Harmony as a Graduation -like game. Graduation (1992) was a type of simulation game where players act as a parent or teacher and enjoy the process of guiding a young girl. Wizard's Harmony has a fantasy-themed setting, and the "raising" element of the game is to enhance the magic ability of their apprentices.

While Hirokazu Hamamura of Famicom Tsūshin described it as a bishōjo game, another reviewer in the magazine noted that players could select male characters to raise as well. There is no video in the game, but there is what a reviewer in Famicom Tsūshin described as an emphasis on sound, with all the characters being voice-acted. There are more female than male characters.

The player takes the role of Rufus, a student at Wizards Academy. The school is on the verge of closure, with Rufus's goal being to revive the academy. The goal involves getting five apprentices from around the school and recruiting them. Depending on the choices the player makes during conversations, certain potential apprentices may join or part ways with the player. Once five of the potential fifteen are gathered, the game continues.

Rufus has one in-game year to complete their task of raising the students. There are six days of club activities to enhance the apprentice's magic a week. A weekly schedule is set with the goal of having the student pass their magical skill tests. Three times a year, the chosen apprentices must be at a certain level of magic ability as dictated by three different tests a year.

== Release ==
Following the release of Exector (1995), Arc System Works' next release was Wizard's Harmony. It was released in Japan for the Sega Saturn and PlayStation on December 29, 1995. A reviewer in Famicom Tsūshin said that aside from the differences in backgrounds, the Sega Saturn and PlayStation versions' content were basically the same.

Follow-ups to the game include Wizard's Harmony 2 (1997) for the PlayStation and Saturn and Wizard's Harmony R (1998) for the PlayStation. The three games sold around approximately 100,000 copies. Arc Systems released Wizard's Symphony (2018), a role playing video game set 20 years after the events of Wizard's Harmony.

== Reception ==
Reception

Review scores
Publication	Score	
Publication	PS	Saturn
Dengeki PlayStation	55/100, 75/100, 60/100, 70/100	
Famicom Tsūshin	6/10, 6/10, 5/10, 5/10	6/10, 6/10, 5/10, 5/10
Sega Saturn Magazine		5.33/10

A number of reviewers in Famicom Tsūshin and two in Dengeki PlayStation found the game to have plenty events that gave the game good pacing. One reviewer in Dengeki PlayStation found that the events ended too abruptly while another said they should have had more to it, such as having mini-games.

One Famicom Tsūshin reviewers complimented the variety of characters, while another called them unique. The initial reviewer cautioned that if you are not interested in the design of these characters with pointed ears, the game may not be to some players' tastes. Other reviewers found the use of magic in the games to be confusing as it was not explained on screen, while one summarized that the game was not as strong as Tokimeki Memorial (1994). A reviewer in Sega Saturn Magazine said that other mechanics were too confusing such as what made would make certain characters more compatible than others and that compared to previous games in the genre, Wizard's Harmony lacked originality. Another reviewer from the magazine said the events seemed too random to be enjoyable.

Both Sega Saturn Magazine and Famicom Tsūshin complimented the games lower than average price as positive.
