= Zero4 Champ RR =

1994 video game

- Developer: Media Rings
- Publisher: Media Rings
- Director: Yasunori Iseki
- Programmers: Ryoichi Sato; Hiroshi Kato
- Composers: Katsuhiro Hayashi; Jouji Iijima
- Series: Zero4 Champ
- Platform: Super Famicom
- Release: JP: July 22, 1994
- Genre: Racing
- Modes: Single-player, multiplayer

Zero4 Champ RR (ゼロヨンチャンプ ダブルアール) is a 1994 racing video game developed and published by Media Rings for the Super Famicom. The game is about an 18-year-old race car driver who must chase his dreams of drag racing after being turned down for university and becoming a rōnin due to his joblessness status. The game received a sequel, Zero4 Champ RR-Z.

== Gameplay ==
A drag race is underway between two vehicles of a similar make.

In between races, the player must maintain a part-time job in order to earn money for the next race. There are elements of the role playing and simulation game genres present as the player must build up the character through his job as a security guard and through social interactions with the racing community. While being a security guard, players can bump into random encounters into enemies such as wandering rats. Attacking, using an item, or running away from battle are the only options. Losing all of the player's experience points means getting fired from the security guard job.

Vehicle models included in the game are Toyota, Nissan, Mitsubishi, Mazda, and Honda. Automatic transmission is not available in the game but players can choose between 4-speed, 5-speed, or 6-speed manual transmission for their chosen Japanese car. All measurements are done using metric (i.e., kilometres per hour as opposed to miles per hour). Besides the story mode, the player can either challenge computer opponents or the best time on the battery backup to a drag racing showdown with all the rules of drag racing (including flying starts). Players must go to driving school and pass a test based on their proficiency with gear shifting and speed control before beginning their racing careers.

The versus mode that allows the single contestant to either play by himself or against a computer opponent also allows multiple human opponents. In order for the three different multiplayer modes to be selected, additional controller(s) must be inserted. The "four drag strip system" is used when three to four competitors are involved as opposed to the "two drag strip system". All the important drag race rules apply even in three-player and four-player matches (with violating the rules more than twice leading to automatic disqualification and game over).

== Release and reception ==
Reception

Review score
Publication	Score
Famitsu	8/10 8/10, 7/10, 7/10

Zero Champ RR was released for the Super Famicom in Japan on July 22, 1994.
