= Cyber Spin =

1992 video game

- North American cover art
- Developer: Arc System Works
- Publisher: Takara
- Designers: Masako Araki; Keiko Kayajima
- Composer: Junya Kozakai
- Platform: Super NES
- Release: JP: March 19, 1992; NA: November 1992
- Genre: Racing
- Mode: Single-player

Cyber Spin is a futuristic racing video game released in 1992 to Japan and North America for the Super NES. It is known in Japan as Shinseiki GPX: Cyber Formula (新世紀GPXサイバーフォーミュラ, New Century GPX Saiba Fomyura; "New Century GPX Cyber Formula") which is based on the anime Future GPX Cyber Formula.

== Gameplay ==
Cyber Spin uses a top-down perspective and was designed in the same technique as classic arcade racing games. The vehicles are different in the two versions. There are tracks all around the world. Players become a part of a science-fiction version of the 2015 Formula One season, in which all automobiles are turbocharged with future technology that gives extra speed every time a "Power Boost" is used, at the cost of the vehicle's energy reserves. In the Japanese version, the fastest car (Super Asurada 01) can travel up to 512 kilometres per hour (318 mph).

Choosing a car/pilot in the Free mode or GPX mode. This feature is only available in the Japanese title.

Players do not automatically qualify for races, and must beat a certain time limit to advance the storyline. There are a free mode, a GPX mode (Japanese release only), password mode, and scenario mode (with Japanese anime-like cut scenes in the Japanese version). Players can keep their progress in the game using passwords consisting of letters and numbers. In the scenario mode, the object is to guide an up-and-coming driver to victory. Quitting once means game over. The order of the race tracks is different in the Japanese and North American versions. For example, the tracks in the earlier stages of the North American version are quite simple, while the Japanese version includes more complex race layouts starting from the second level.

== Reception ==
Allgame gave this video game a score of 3 stars out of a possible 5.

== See also ==
- Battle Grand Prix
