= The Legend of Bishin =

1993 video game

- Cover art by Katsuya Terada
- Developer: Magifact
- Publisher: Magifact
- Composers: Osamu Kido; Takeshi Sakamoto
- Platform: Super Famicom
- Release: JP: December 25, 1993
- Genres: Beat 'em up, action, racing
- Modes: Single-player, multiplayer

Zoku: The Legend of Bishin (美神伝説Ｚｏｋｕ, Bishin Densetsu Zoku) is a hybrid racing and beat 'em up video game that was developed and published by Magifact for the Super Famicom in 1993 only in Japan.

== Gameplay ==
The player must drive an automobile through a labyrinth-like series of roadways using either the male character Koji or the female character Lisa and fighting off the thugs that roam the roads. This part of the game is similar to F-Zero and Spy Hunter. A failure to make it to a destination on time results in a game over and a Final Fight-type sequence commences if the player's vehicle suffered enough damage. A versus version of it also available as a standalone mode from the main menu, featuring Koji, Lisa, and some of the game's bosses: Lei-Fan, Miki & Aki (ninja twins fighting at once), Miyabi, Flare, and Ryoko.

== Plot ==
The game takes place in and around Neo Tokyo after a new Great Depression of 2010 (future at the time of the game's release) and after Mount Fuji erupts in a catastrophic manner in the year 2020. While Tokyo survives and the people managed to repair the areas destroyed by the volcano, it became infested with motorcycle gangs. An all-female gang known as the Bishin dominates with the help of their leader, Ryoko.

Koji (コージ), a 20-year-old former professional boxer, and Lisa (リサ), a 16-year-old who used to be a high-ranking Bishin member but left, are attacked and one of them is kidnapped while the other sets out to take down the gang and rescue his or her partner using Koji's Cobra 429 car. They go through a desert (boss: Lidera), forest (boss: Roller and Dozer), volcano (boss: Lei-Fan), super-highway (boss: Miki & Aki), construction area (boss: Miyabi), bayside highway (boss: Flare), and the streets of Neo-Tokyo (boss: Ryoko).
