= Zero4 Champ RR-Z =

1995 video game

- SFC game cover
- Developer: Media Rings Corporation
- Publisher: Media Rings Corporation
- Composer: Kennosuke Suemura
- Series: Zero4 Champ
- Platform: Super Famicom
- Release: JP: November 25, 1995
- Genre: Arcade racing
- Modes: Single-player, multiplayer

Zero4 Champ RR-Z (ゼロヨンチャンプ ダブルアール・ヅィー, Double R Dzui Zero Yon Chanpu) is a 1995 racing video game developed by Media Rings for the Super Famicom and the sequel to Zero4 Champ RR.

== Summary ==
Both of the players are trying to win a drag race.

Vehicle manufacturers in the game include Honda, Mazda, Mitsubishi, Mitsuoka, Nissan, Subaru, and Toyota.

This game is an anime-style racing video game with an extensive simulation mode. In the game, the 18-year-old that the player controlled in Zero Champ RR became the champion of the Japanese Drag Racing World but was insulted. As a result, he moved to a new city to start his drag racing career over from scratch. Automatic transmission is now included but has a 0.5 second stall time between changing gears.

There are three options on the title screen: the full story (involving the 18-year-old driver pursuing his dreams), a versus mode (allowing players to use all the automobiles available in the game), and a mini-story mode that allows players to play on episodic matches in selected high-priced racing vehicles (some of them costing almost one billion yen).
