= Kyūkōsha no Shōjo =

2012 video game

- Developer(s): Arc System Works
- Publisher(s): Arc System Works
- Platform(s): Nintendo 3DS
- Release: JP: August 1, 2012
- Genre(s): Adventure
- Mode(s): Single-player

Kyūkōsha no Shōjo (脱出アドベンチャー旧校舎の少女) is a 2012 Nintendo 3DS video game.
