= World End Syndrome =

2018 video game

- Developer: Toybox Games
- Publishers: Arc System Works, PQube (Europe)
- Artist: Yuki Kato
- Writer: Tomio Kanazawa
- Platforms: Nintendo Switch, PlayStation 4
- Release: JP: August 30, 2018; NA: May 19, 2019; EU: June 14, 2019
- Genre: Visual novel
- Mode: Single-player

World End Syndrome is a 2018 Japanese visual novel developed by Toybox Games. The game was published by Arc System Works in Japan and North America, and by PQube games in Europe, and was released on the Nintendo Switch and PlayStation 4 platforms. A sequel, World End Phenomenon, has been announced, though no details have been revealed yet.

== Gameplay ==
The game largely plays as a traditional visual novel, with most of the game consisting of reading text and selecting different dialogue choices that divert the path of the story. The game features a similar game structure to modern Persona video games, where progression is tied to a calendar system, where players may choose to move to different locations see various events across different days and times of day including morning, afternoon, and evening.

== Story ==
The story takes place in the small fictional Japanese town of Mihate. The game follows an unnamed male high school student who moves to the town and joins his school's "Mystery Club". In it, he investigates the urban legend of the "Yomibito", an event occurring every 100 years where corpses rise from the dead and rampage across the land. Investigation is spurred upon the realization that it has been 100 years since the supposedly last occurrence, and the unexplained recent deaths of students of the school. The game delves into a number of different genre as the story unfolds, including horror, mystery, romance, and "slice of life".

== Development ==
The game's Japanese release was initially scheduled for April 2018, before being delayed into mid-2018. The game was later translated into English and released in North America on May 2, 2019, and Europe on June 14, 2019. All regions of the game were released on the Nintendo Switch and PlayStation 4 video game consoles. The game was developed by Toybox Games, and outside of Europe, where it was published by PQube, the game was published by Arc System Works, publisher of the BlazBlue and Xblaze video games. World End Syndrome features the art and character designer from the two titles, from artist Yuki Kato. The game's scenario was written by Tomio Kanazawa, who had previously produced Deadly Premonition. Toybox and Arc System Works had previously collaborated on the title Tokyo Twilight Ghost Hunters.

== Reception ==
The game was generally well received by critics. Multiple reviewers praised the character development of the characters in the game, with characters evolving out of their original appearance of a standard anime tropes. Critics generally praised the story, but conceded that the game didn't particularly break any new ground for the genre, and that there were a fair amount of typos in the script. Some reviewers also had mixed feelings about the developer's decision to force the player to receive the "bad ending" the first time through the game, without the ability to avoid it, or any indication that another outcome becomes available upon subsequent playthroughs of the game. Hardcore Gamer praised the game for what it was, concluding that the game "isn't going to change anyone's mind about visual novels. That's not the developer's goals. This is a title aimed squarely at existing fans. For the forgiving segment of the audience, this is a must-play". Nintendo World Report echoed these sentiments. Pocket Gamer compared its juxtaposition of cheerful graphics and story with dark undertones to Doki Doki Literature Club.

Nintendo Life named it one of the stand-out visual novels for the Nintendo Switch, praising the depth of the characters.

== Potential sequel ==
In December 2019, in a segment where Japanese developer hint about what they will be working on in the upcoming year, Toybox Games developer Tomio Kanazawa announced that the title would receive a sequel titled World End Phenomenon. However, as of 2025, no further developments have been announced regarding the title.
