= Cross Tantei Monogatari =

1998 video game

- Sega Saturn cover art
- Developer: WorkJam
- Publisher: WorkJam
- Platform: Sega Saturn PlayStation
- Release: Sega Saturn: JP: 25 June 1998; PlayStation: JP: 21 October 1999
- Genres: Visual novel, adventure
- Mode: Single-player

Cross Tantei Monogatari (クロス 探偵 物語) also known as Cross Detective Story is an adventure game developed and published by WorkJam for the PlayStation and Sega Saturn. It was released only in Japan in 1998.

The game was the first to be developed by WorkJam. It was originally released for the Sega Saturn, and was remade for the PlayStation, containing additional features. Upon release, Japanese reviews were positive, but the game was a commercial failure.

== Gameplay and Plot ==
Cross Tantei Monogatari is a visual novel, and is mostly played as a young 18-year-old detective named Koruso Ken. Aided by his partner Nishiyama Tomoko, they must solve 7 cases. Each case takes place in different parts of the city and involves different suspects.

In each case, background information is provided first, and then a crime happens. The player then examines the crime scene for clues to solve the case. The game has been noted to have similarities to the Ace Attorney game series.

== Release ==
The game was featured in Japan's June 1996 issue of Sega Saturn Magazine. Those who pre-ordered the game also received a demo of the game beforehand, plus a copy of the game's theme song. In addition, those who completed the game and entered a code found at the end of the game on WorkJam's website were entered in a draw for a trip to Italy, and various tech products.

PlayStation Release

WorkJam also launched the game on PlayStation, featuring additional voice acting and corrections from the original. It was released on October 21, 1999. Hamster later published it as a budget game in two separate releases: Kōhen and Zenpen. Each release is one half of the game, and they contain bonus content. Both were released for 1500 yen each on September 28, 2000.

== Reception ==
Reception

Review score
Publication	Score
Famitsu	8/10, 8/10, 8/10, 8/10 (PS)

Sega Saturn Release

Japanese reviews were positive. segaretro.com aggregated 5 known reviews, and it averaged at 83/100.

Famitsu reviewers praised the presentation, story and difficulty, while criticizing the lack of hints in the gameplay. Sega Saturn Magazine and Saturn Fan also gave the game positive reviews, with a 94/100 and an 83/100 respectively.

PlayStation Release Reviewers in Famitsu noted that the PlayStation version fixed some problems with the original.

Sequel WorkJam announced a sequel to the game shortly after its release. In a 2002 press interview, WorkJam announced, "We will focus on developing games with Jinguji Saburo and Cross as our two main pillars." While the Jinguji Saburo series continued to be developed, the Cross series did not receive further games. Game Eye Magazine also reported that sales for the game were low.
