= Zero4 Champ =

1991 video game

- Developer(s): Media Rings
- Publisher(s): Media Rings
- Director(s): Yutaka Kaminaga
- Platform(s): PC Engine
- Release: JP: 1991
- Genre(s): Racing video game
- Mode(s): Single-player, multiplayer

Zero4 Champ (ゼロヨンチャンプ, Zeroyon Chanpu) is a series of racing games created by Yutaka Kaminaga at Media Rings, which started in 1991 with the PC Engine title Zero4 Champ.

The series would transfer to the Kaminaga-founded WorkJam with the PlayStation 2 title Zero4 Champ Series: Drift Champ, co-developed by Tamsoft and published by Hudson Soft, along with the mobile phone Go! Zero4 Champ developed by Profire, both of which were released in late 2002.

The series is something of a predecessor to works like Initial D and Wangan Midnight, with its touge racing, aero parts tuning, and anime-style "Story Mode". It has also RPG and simulation gameplay which was succeeded by the Shutokou Battle titles Kattobi Tune and Racing Battle C1 Grand Prix.

== Conception ==
In Japan, street racing sometimes occurs on long straights in industrial areas, which are used for drag races. These races are known as "zero-yon" (ゼロヨン) or "04", short for "0-400 meters", ヨン being Japanese for the number four.

Japanese drag racing is noted for its flair, featuring various sport-grade Japanese cars such as the Toyota MR2-GT (SW20), Mazda RX-7 Type RS (FD3S), Mitsubishi Lancer Evolution VI (CP9A), Subaru Impreza WRX STi (GDB), the Nissan Skyline GT-R V-Spec (BNR34), and Honda NSX Type-S Zero (NA2), all import scene classics.

== Games ==
The following games are released under the Zero Champ series:

- (Japan) 1991.03.08: Zero4 Champ (ゼロヨンチャンプ), PC Engine
- (Japan) 1993.05.03: Zero4 Champ II (ゼロヨンチャンプII), PC Engine Super CD-ROM²
- (Japan) 1994.07.22: Zero4 Champ RR (ゼロヨンチャンプ ダブルアール), Super Famicom
- (Japan) 1995.11.25: Zero4 Champ RR-Z (ゼロヨンチャンプ ダブルアール・ヅィー), Super Famicom
- (Japan) 1997.06.20: Zero4 Champ DooZy-J (ゼロヨンチャンプ ドゥーヅィージェイ), PlayStation / Sega Saturn (subtitled Type-R / タイプアール for the latter console)
- (Japan) 2002.11.21: Zero4 Champ Series: Drift Champ (ゼロヨンチャンプ シリーズ ドリフトチャンプ), PlayStation 2 (Hudson Soft)
- (Japan) 2002.12.24: Go! Zero4 Champ (GO!04チャンプ), Mobile phone i-mode 504i (Hudson Soft / Profire)

== Zero4 Extreme ==
In June 2005, a fan-made flash game Zero4 Extreme (ゼロヨンエクストリーム) was released by Kuruma, though it is currently a dead link.

== See also ==
- Initial D
- Wangan Midnight
- Shutokou Battle
