= The Monkey King (manga) =

Japanese manga series

西遊奇伝 大猿王 (Saiyukiden Daienou)
- Genre: Adventure, fantasy
- Manga
- Written by: Katsuya Terada
- Published by: Shueisha
- English publisher: NA: Dark Horse Comics
- Magazine: Ultra Jump
- Original run: 1998 – present
- Volumes: 2+

The Monkey King (西遊奇伝 大猿王, Saiyukiden Daienō; literally "Legendary Journey to the West: The Great Monkey King"), also known as Katsuya Terada's The Monkey King, is a fantasy manga series, written and illustrated in full color by Katsuya Terada.

== Story ==
The story is based on the 16th century Chinese novel Journey to the West. Katsuya Terada's take on the legend of the Monkey King in a savage, lusty saga that The Portland Tribune calls "a Buddhist version of Conan the Barbarian."
