= Ground Divers! =

2022 video game

- Developer: Arc System Works
- Publisher: Arc System Works
- Artists: Shigeto Koyama; Kakeru Kakemaru
- Composer: Hironobu Kageyama
- Platform: Nintendo Switch
- Release: June 30, 2022
- Genres: Roguelike; Strategy
- Mode: Single-player

Ground Divers! is a 2022 roguelike strategy game developed and published by Arc System Works for Nintendo Switch. Described as a "slapstick discovery game", the game tasks players with guiding the titular "Ground Diver" robot Tsuruhashi as it seeks to uncover "rare matter", an energy source found deep underground. It received average reviews from critics.

== Gameplay ==
Ground Divers! is a real-time strategy roguelite revolving around time and resource management. The player guides the robot Tsuruhashi across seven timed main stages and numerous sub-stages with the ultimate goal of finding rare matter. Instead of directly controlling Tsuruhashi, players instead set down pins on a grid-based map in order to plot a line for Tsuruashi to dig. Each pin requires a certain amount of AP in order to be set. Set pins can be removed in order to regain AP. AP is generated through mining blocks, destroying enemies, and selling or using items. Depending on its current equipment, Tsuruhashi can use a special move by using AP and a resource called "Cheer Energy", where the player cheers for Tsuruhashi for a short amount of time. During this period, Tsuruhashi's mining and combat efficiency is greatly increased. Additionally, more special moves can be unlocked and used during this time if certain AP and cheer thresholds are met. Cheer Energy depletes naturally over time and decays faster the farther Tsuruhashi descends underground due to it being pumped from the main base. Cheer Energy can be replenished if Tsuruhashi connects cables found in the tunnels across the map.

Additional sub-camps can be created within the mining fields that temporarily pause the timer and, depending on the camp's upgrade level, can give Tsuruhashi access beneficial options by spending AP such as exchanging items for additional AP, leveling up, scouting out uncovered areas of the map, purchasing support droids, and changing equipment.

Combat is performed automatically as Tsuruhashi automatically attacks enemies within range. If Tsuruhashi gets within an enemy's radius, they will fight Tsuruhashi for a small amount of time before attempting to head to the player's camp and destroy it, which will result in a game over.

The player can also visit the main base to watch additional story segments, upgrade the base, unlock accessories to decorate the base, customize Tsuruhashi, or replay main or sub-stages.

== Plot ==
In the past, on a planet in a distant solar system, society faced destruction due to the increasing scarcity of energy sources. The planet was saved by divine intervention in the form of a tool known as “Tsuruhashi” by teaching the people to excavate an energy source known as “rare matter” from deep underground. Tsuruhashi then vanished afterwards. In the present, teams known as Ground Divers create “mining frames” to explore the underground and unearth rare matter. The player takes a role as a member of Studio Tsuruhashi and pilots the mining frame “Tsuruhashi”, named after the planet's savior, which operates using energy from “Cheer Crystals.” The player guides Tsuruhashi deep underground to find rare earth while also seeking to uncover the mystery behind the Cheer Crystals.

== Reception ==
Reception

Aggregate scores
Aggregator	Score
Metacritic	72/100
OpenCritic	38% recommend

According to the review aggregation website Metacritic, Ground Divers! received "mixed or average" reviews from critics. Fellow review aggregator OpenCritic assessed that the game received fair approval, being recommended by 38% of critics. Siliconera reviewer Jenni Lada noted that while the game suffered from intense difficulty spikes, the difficulty was ultimately manageable, and that the game had immense replay value its additional difficulty levels and optional challenges.
