= R/C Helicopter =

2002 video game

Petit Copter
- Developers: Arc System Works; Sonic Powered; AquaSystem (Xbox)
- Publisher: AquaSystem
- Platforms: Windows; PlayStation 2 Xbox; Wii
- Release: JP: May 30, 2002

R/C Helicopter: Indoor Flight Simulation (titled Puchi Copter in its original Japanese release) is a flight simulation video game for the PlayStation 2, Xbox and Windows that involves piloting a radio-controlled helicopter. It received multiple sequels: Radio Helicopter II (Puchi Copter 2 in Japan), released for Windows in 2003 and PlayStation 2 in 2005, and Mini Copter: Adventure Flight (Puchi Copter Wii: Adventure Flight in Japan) for Wii by Arc System Works and Sonic Powered, which was released in 2008.
