= Katsuya Terada =

Japanese illustrator and cartoonist

- Born: December 7, 1963 (age 62); Tamano, Okayama, Japan
- Occupations: Illustrator and cartoonist
- Website: cacazan.com

Katsuya Terada (寺田 克也, Terada Katsuya; born December 7, 1963), is a Japanese illustrator and cartoonist from the town of Tamano, Okayama. His alias is the portmanteau Rakugakingu (ラクガキング, "Doodle King"). Terada's prolific visual arts practice uniquely straddles the lines between manga, fine art, and digital design. His work ranges widely from highly detailed comics and novel illustrations to expressive, futuristic character designs for video games and anime. Terada posts actively on Facebook as Katsuya "t e r r a" Terada, as well as on his web blog terra's book.

== Biography ==
Since his childhood, Terada grew up immersed in Japanese manga culture. When Terada was fifteen years old, he discovered the work of French artist Jean Giraud, also known as Moebius, and the Japanese manga artist and creator of Akira, Katsuhiro Otomo. Growing up, these two artist were inspirational to Terada for combining clean line art styles from book illustration with the dynamic energy of manga. The work of Moebius also encouraged Terada to develop his own aesthetic stylized less along anime lines, but rather more realistic in its approach. In elementary school, Terada notes that he stood out for drawing and painting, stating, "I was small and couldn't study, so I focused more on painting." Like many young Japanese boys, he grew up buying Weekly Shonen Jump and other comic book titles from his pocket money. As a child, he aspired to becoming a cartoonist, but worried about having to write his own narratives. In junior high school, he geared his ambitions more towards becoming a book illustrator. He says, "I wanted to have it the easy way. An illustrator doesn't have to think about the story." The artist describes himself as an "incessant scribbler," riding the Tokyo subway filling up notebooks that he buys "by the box." He describes drawing as almost a physical need for him, comparing his daily routine to the preparations of a marathon runner: "The more time I spend on drawing, the closer I get to that line that I am imagining. Every day of practice prepares you better for that one moment."

Terada began his career as a manga artist and illustrator. After high school, Terada enrolled in Asagaya College of Art and Design in Tokyo while his family lived in Chiba, and took his first assignments designing advertisements. With this early advertising success, Terada rented his first apartment. At age 21 he received a commission for work from animator Toshio Nishiuchi to produce character designs, background illustrations, instruction manual art, as well as a logo for Nintendo's home entertainment system, the NES/Famicom. Following this assignment, Terada took on more work in the Japanese gaming industry. From 1989 to 1995, he produced illustrations for Nintendo Power, a promotional magazine for North American markets, particularly on The Legend of Zelda: Link's Awakening and The Legend of Zelda: A Link to the Past. Terada's illustrations served to supplement player experiences of the NES games, due to the early system's limited capacity to show details on a screen. Terada then worked on the box art for the Japanese edition of the video game Prince of Persia for the SNES, as well as character designs for Virtua Fighter 2, SEGA's 1994 follow-up to the influential Virtua Fighter, embracing 3D designs.

However, he has become best known for character design projects, such as his work for the Japanese animated film Blood: The Last Vampire. In the case of Blood: The Last Vampire, the game's director, Hiroyuki Kitakubo, specifically reached out with the film script in hand to commission Terada to develop character sketches. Terada has also undertaken work related to American comics, such as Iron Man and Hellboy (one of his illustrations was used for an official statuette of Hellboy). He made additional contributions to early issues of Nintendo Power, including a special edition strategy guide for Dragon Warrior and artwork for The Legend of Zelda. In Japan, he was responsible for the original character designs for the Tantei Jingūji Saburō mystery adventure video game series, and has worked prolifically on this series, most consistently as the cover illustration artist. Terada was in charge of the book cover and illustrations for the Kimaira series written by Baku Yumemakura, and was in charge of cover design and illustrations for Garōden, Shin Majugari, and Yamigarishi, as well. Terada has defined himself as a "rakugaki" artist, which he invokes more in terms of a philosophy than a specific style of drawing: he draws a little bit everywhere, all the time, on notebooks and other surfaces without thinking too much. He is a very prolific artist with one of his sketch collections numbering more than 1000 pages, and appropriately titled RakugaKing. He has done very little group-drawn work, his principal activities being illustration and character design.

The exception to this is Terada's manga The Monkey King, originally published by Shueisha as Saiyukiden Daienō in Japanese in 1995, then translated into English in 2005 by Dark Horse publishing. The 2005 release was Terada's first-ever English manga. The Monkey King is based on epic hero narrative of the pilgrimage to India by Hsüan Tsang (ca. 596–664), a Tang period Buddhist monk, which over time has been combined with pre-existent Chinese folktales. In the sixteenth century, the narrative was synthesized into a one hundred-chapter master narrative titled Xi You Ji or The Journey to the West by Wu Ch'êng-ên (ca.1500-1582). Terada's full-color graphic novel reimagines the narrative of the Monkey's Journey to the West, with monstrous and demonic characters.

Other major works by Terada include Rakuda Laughs, or Rakuda Ga Warau, a 2022 manga that follows the misdemeanors of a trigger-happy Yakuza member named Rakuda; Busin 0 (for video game character and world design); and Yatterman and Kamen Rider (for TV/film character design).

His use of CG tools is integrated very well in his illustrations, giving his work a vivid and rich appearance. He has admitted various influences on his work, particularly European ones, like Jean Giraud (aka Moebius) and the magazine Métal hurlant which he has said gave him a taste for strong, scantily-clad women.

Along with other illustrators such as Takashi Okazaki, Terada has done illustrations for a book by film historians Steve Ryfle and Ed Godziszewski that is included in a Godzilla Criterion box set. Terada was also invited to create variant cover for Geof Darrow's American comic series Shaolin Cowboy: Cruel to Be Kin issue 5, published by Dark Horse.

== Art style ==
In his review of The Monkey King, writer Ray Olson writes that Terada's artwork "explodes with energy, overflows with baroque lineation and voluptuous figuration, exploits color like a chameleon with multiple personality disorder." His unique pictorial style—which pulls from an internal lexicon of imagined elements—combines Western and Asian comic conventions and motifs. Pulling from this large internal bank of visual vocabulary, he is known for doing hours-long live-drawing events, in which he creates original artworks line-by-line from imagination without sketching, a type of event popularized by Korean artist Kim Jung Gi. He describes his design process as pulling from his internal visual bank: "I have a habit of looking at objects and imagining how they would transfer from shapes to lines. Over time, I have built a visual library in my head where I am able to pull up these images and details when I need them." By drawing lines that he describes as not existing in the natural world, he builds original images, characters, and subjects one pen-stroke at a time. Speaking to his live-drawing practice, Terada notes: "The drawing starts as soon as the line becomes visible. As the lines start to emerge, you start to see more connections. Things come to a halt when they stop appearing. So, I try to avoid making mistakes. I look closely at what I am doing and go through a catalogue of objects (in my head). I put them together and then start to draw, while questioning if what I am doing is correct. If I check that I haven't made any mistakes, eventually I feel alright with the creation. It might not be a feeling of total satisfaction, but I think this type of journey is what live drawing is all about." Over the years his work has spanned a range of media, using water-based markers, paints, brush pens and pencils, as well as digital media. Presently, Terada says that he sketches nearly everything on a 13" iPad Pro, allowing him to work with speed and freedom.

== Works ==
His first portfolio art book, Zenbu, was published in Japan in 1999 by Kodansha; it is a 300 pages collection of character and concept designs. This portfolio was followed by Cover Girls in 2000, and RakugaKing in 2002. In 2003, Terada was chosen as one of 25 artists to rework and release twelve pairs of the Nike Dunk sneaker as part of Nike's traveling White Dunk Competition. Terada's first U.S. exhibition was held in 2004 at Compound Gallery in Portland, Oregon, co-hosted by Dark Horse Comics. This was followed by a second solo exhibition at Compound again in 2011 titled Terra‘s Black Marker. In 2008, Terada published an illustration book with Katsuhiro Otomo titled VIVA IL CICLISSIMO! (ビバ・イル・チクリッシモ!), which centers on professional cycling. For this project, Terada and Otomo followed the Giro d'Italia cycling race (Tour of Italy, which is the second largest cycling race after the Tour de France) for a month to gather materials and research. Terada's artbook DRAGON GIRL & MONKEY KING: The Art of Katsuya Terada (Dark Horse Comics) was published in the US in 2014. To promote its publishing, Terada attended San Diego Comic-Con in 2014 and did multiple book signings and live drawings. In 2014, Terada also published his artbook Erotic Engineering, exploring his personal brand of mixing pin-up style images of women with machinery, including small captions giving insight to the over-eighty illustrations. In 2013, Kyoto International Manga Museum held the exhibition Katsuya Terada TEN – 10 Year Retrospective, his first solo retrospective. The exhibition featured 300 color illustrations and background designs, and included original artwork. It was a project supervised by writer, editor, and game designer Gabin Ito, and coincided with Terada's TEN - 10 Year Retrospective illustration book. Then, the solo exhibition KATSUYA TERADA Koko 12 years - How do you Draw a Picture? (寺田克也 ココ12年～絵を描いて生きていく方法？) was held in 2015 at the Fukushima Sakura Yu-gakusha. Terada has also shown work in gallery settings throughout Japan and Taiwan for many years. Terada also has shown work on the West coast of the United States, and in particular, in Los Angeles every December with Giant Robot 2. In 2017, Terada's work was included in a major group show curated by Takashi Murakami and Juxtapoz Magazine Editor-in-Chief Evan Pricco titled Juxtapoz x Superflat at the Vancouver Art Gallery. The exhibition, featuring 36 global artists, focused on art practices shaped by subcultures like skate, surf, graffiti, street art, comics, and digital arts. The artbook Real Size was released in 2019 as a book of 150 illustrations containing one-shot drawings using only black marker. Its release was followed by a signing event at Kinokuniya, Los Angeles. Terada's first work in bronze sculpture was exhibited at Tokyo-based gallery Hidari Zingaro in 2021 for the solo exhibition Monster Head Girl. The work utilized 3D data and served as Terada's first venture into digital sculpture using Nomad sculpt software. At Gallery House Maya in Aoyama, Tokyo, Terada also held a 2020 exhibition of 19 new pencil illustrations titled The Monster and the Boy (モンスターと少年).

=== Illustration collections ===
Romaji Title	Japanese Title	Release Date	ISBN
	戦国自衛隊1549	05-20-05	ISBN 4-04-873614-0
Work Jam Licensed Detective Saburō Jingūji - Artbook: Detective File	ワークジャム公認探偵神宮寺三郎DETECTIVE FILE	02-05	ISBN 4-7572-1136-8
Katsuya Terada & Stapa & Gabin - Photobook: John Symmetry	ジョン・シンメトリー	06-04	ISBN 4-947752-63-7
Busin 0 – Character & World Guide for the game Busin 0	寺田克也グラフィックス	03-31-04	ISBN 4-7577-1852-7
Paint Visual Works Poster Book	彩京ビジュアルワークスポスターブック	05-03	ISBN 4-89829-882-6
Shashou	車掌	04-03	ISBN 4-434-03067-1
Lemni3003 Imada Minu Megamitachi E	Lemni3003 未だ見ぬ女神たちへ	12-19-02	ISBN 4-334-90106-9
Terada Katsuya Presents - Rakuda Ga Warau	ラクダが笑う	11-02	ISBN 4-89829-866-4
Painter bon!	ペインタボン!	07-02	ISBN 4-947752-22-X
RakugaKing	寺田克也ラクガキング	01-23-02	ISBN 4-7572-0885-5
Bitch's Life Illustration File	ビッチズ・ライフイラストレーションファイル	01-01	ISBN 978-4-7661-1209-2
Terada Katsuya Poster Book	寺田克也ポスターブック	12-00	ISBN 4-06-345073-2
Terra's Cover Girls	カバー・ガールズ	11-00	ISBN 4-89829-813-3
Zenbu – The Complete Works	寺田克也全部―寺田克也全仕事集	10-99	ISBN 4-06-330083-8
Saiyukiden Daienou (Monkey King) Vol.1	西遊奇伝大猿王	12-98	ISBN 4-08-782575-2
Devilman 1999	デビルマン1999	11-98	ISBN 4-06-330067-6
Virtua Fighter 2 - Ten Stories	バーチャファイター2テンストーリーズ	03-97	ISBN 4-89366-684-3
Chotto Furukute Ii Kuruma Nya Norazu Ni Irarenai !	ちょっとフルくてイイくるまにゃのらずにいられないっ!	10-94	ISBN 4-418-94405-2

=== Works published in English ===
Title	Release Date	ISBN
The Monkey King Volume 1	09-25-05	ISBN 1-59307-304-6
Terada KATSUYA + KIM Jung Gi	2017	ISBN 978-89-959732-9-5

=== Films ===
English Title	Credit
Blood: The Last Vampire	3d cgi, character design
Cutie Honey	concept artist, costume design
Devilman (live action)	concept artist
Godzilla: Final Wars (live action)	Designer: Monster X
The Great Yokai War: Guardians	yōkai designer [with Junya Inoue and Hiromitsu Soma]

=== Video games (character and world design) ===
Title	Platform
Tantei Jingūji Saburō series	FDS, NES, SS, PS, PS2, 3DS, PS4, Switch
Wizardry: Tale of the Forsaken Land	PS2
Busin 0: Wizardry Alternative NEO	PS2
Sangokushi	PS2
Street Golfer	PS2
The Legend of Bishin	Super Famicom
Battle K-Road	Arcade
The Fallen Angels/Daraku Tenshi	Arcade
Sol Divide - Sword of Darkness	Arcade
Virtua Fighter Remix	Sega Saturn
The Legend of Zelda	Nintendo Entertainment System
The Legend of Zelda: A Link to the Past	Super NES
The Legend of Zelda: Link's Awakening	Nintendo Game Boy
Prince of Persia	Super NES
Tekken 5	PS2
Tekken Tag Tournament 2	PS3, Wii U, Xbox 360
Wizardry Variants Daphne	iOS, Android, Microsoft Windows
Ryūteki Gosennen: Dragons of China	Sega Saturn
Castlevania: Belmont's Curse	PC (Steam), Xbox Series X|S, PS5

=== Television ===
- Kamen Rider W (2009) - Creature design
- Kamen Rider Ex-Aid (2016) - Creature design
