= WorkJam (video game company) =

Former Japanese video game developer

WorkJam Co. Ltd.
- Industry: Video games, Computer software
- Founded: December 15, 1998
- Founder: Yutaka Kaminaga
- Defunct: 2011
- Headquarters: Chiyoda, Tokyo

WorkJam Co., Ltd. (株式会社ワークジャム Work Jam Co., Ltd.) was a Japanese video game company. Its main headquarters were located in Chiyoda, Tokyo. It was notable for developing the Jake Hunter and Theresia series.

The company held a close relationship to Arc System Works, which published or co-developed many of their games.

== History ==
WorkJam was founded by Yutaka Kaminaga,a former employee of Media Rings on December 15, 1998. That same year, they released their first title in Japan, an adventure game titled Cross Tantei Monogatari. It was published for the Sega Saturn and later the PlayStation. In 1999, Data East licensed out the Tantei Jingūji Saburō series (aka Jake Hunter) to WorkJam. In 2002, it released the first of these licensed games, titled Tantei Jingūji Saburō: Innocent Black. Full rights to the series were given to WorkJam after Data East went bankrupt in 2003.

In 2002, WorkJam and Tamsoft developed Zero4 Champ: Drift Champ, a racing game for the PlayStation 2. It was published by Hudson Soft. WorkJam's founder Yutaka Kaminga had previously directed the Zero4 series when it was still being developed by Media Rings.

WorkJam entered the mobile game market in the early 2000s. They launched many Jake Hunter titles on mobile phones, and in 2006, created a new psychological horror series, titled Theresia. The first title launched for Docomo FOMA phones, as just Theresia.

In 2008, Aksys Games localized and published Jake Hunter: Detective Chronicles in the US, the first WorkJam title to make it out of Japan. Following negative reviews due to its poor localization, it was remade and re-released as Jake Hunter Detective Story: Memories of the Past, this time to more favorable reception.

Later that year, Theresia: Dear Emile launched on the Nintendo DS, which also received an English localization by Aksys. The title contained a remake of one of WorkJam's previous mobile phone games, Theresia: Dear Martel. The game received mixed reviews and was the last WorkJam title to be released outside of Japan.

In early 2009, Theresia received a Japanese-only iPhone port. It was shortly followed by a third and final title, Theresia: Dear Liszt. It followed a similar timeline, with new characters and map. WorkJam also briefly entered the Korean market, localizing Theresia: Dear Martel for Korean audiences in August 2009.

In 2011, WorkJam closed down, passing responsibilities for the part-developed Fukushū no Rondo to co-developer Arc System Works. It also removed all of its mobile phone games from appstores. The company's social game business was purchased by CommSeed and Cykan Holdings at the end of the same year.

On February 6, 2017, Arc System Works announced that they had acquired the rights to all of the ex-WorkJam properties which had passed to Expris, namely the Jake Hunter, Theresia, Nazo no Jikenbo, and Koneko no Ie series.

== Games ==
- Cross Tantei Monogatari (Sega Saturn, 1998; PlayStation, 1999)
- Tantei Jingūji Saburō: Innocent Black (PlayStation 2, 2002)
- Zero4 Champ: Drift Champ (PlayStation 2, 2002)
- Tantei Jingūji Saburō: Kind of Blue (PlayStation 2, 2004)
- Tantei Jingūji Saburō: Shiroi Kage no Shōjo (Game Boy Advance, 2005)
- Theresia: Dear Martel (i-APPLI, iOS, 2006)
- Jake Hunter: Detective Chronicles (Nintendo DS, 2007)
- Tantei Jingūji Saburō DS: Kienai Kokoro (Nintendo DS, 2008)
- Gakkou no Kowai Uwasa: Hanako-San ga Kita!! Minna no Hanako-San (Nintendo DS, 2008)
- Theresia: Dear Emile (Nintendo DS, 2008)
- Jake Hunter: Seaside City Conspiracy (iOS, 2008)
- Jake Hunter: A Ring with Memories (iOS, 2008)
- Jake Hunter: Crash and Burn (iOS, 2009)
- Jake Hunter: Waiting for Sunrise (iOS, 2009)
- Jake Hunter: A Decisive Move (iOS, 2009)
- Theresia: Dear Liszt (i-APPLI, 2009)
- Tantei Jingūji Saburō DS: Fuserareta Shinjitsu (Nintendo DS, 2009)
- Tantei Jingūji Saburō: Hai to Daiyamondo (PlayStation Portable, 2009)
- Koneko no Ie: Kirishima-ke to Sanbiki no Koneko (Nintendo DS, 2010)
- Tantei Jingūji Saburō DS: Akai Chō (Nintendo DS, 2010)
- Tantei Jingūji Saburō: Fukushū no Rondo (Nintendo 3DS, 2012)
