= Exector =

1995 video game

- Developer: Arc System Works
- Publisher: Arc System Works
- Designer: Daisuke Ishiwatari
- Programmer: Hiroshi Tsuboi
- Composers: Souichi Naritomi; Masahiro Kuroishi; Hajime Asano; Takeshi Matsuoka
- Platforms: PlayStation; PlayStation Portable; PlayStation 3 PlayStation Vita
- Release: JP: 22 September 1995
- Genre: Action–shooter
- Mode: Single-player

Exector (Japanese: エグゼクター) is an action–shooter mech-based video game developed and published by Arc System Works for the PlayStation. It was released exclusively in Japan in 1995 and was the first original title by Arc System Works sold to the general public. In 2017 it was later digitally reissued on PlayStation Portable (PSP), PlayStation 3, and PlayStation Vita.

== Gameplay ==
Players pilots the super-robot Exector from a third-person/top-down perspective and must prevent the Spin Drift's destruction, a space station being pulled toward a mysterious planet by a strange ruin, within a real-time ten-hour mission timer. The player must eliminate enemy robots and find key cards to unlock doors. Available weapons include missiles, lasers, flame throwers, and the "Xector Genocide Gun".

== Release ==
Arc System Works was founded in 1988 and started developing original titles in 1995, releasing Exector in 22 September 1995, the company's first title to be sold to the general public. Exector was launched exclusively for the PlayStation in Japan. In 2017 it was later digitally reissued on PlayStation Portable (PSP), PlayStation 3, and PlayStation Vita.

== See also ==
- List of downloadable PlayStation games (Japan)
