= Birthdays the Beginning =

2017 video game

- North American cover
- Developer: Arc System Works
- Publishers: JP: Arc System Works; WW: NIS America
- Platforms: PlayStation 4, Microsoft Windows, Nintendo Switch
- Release: PlayStation 4: JP: January 19, 2017; NA: May 9, 2017; EU: May 12, 2017; AU: May 26, 2017; Windows: WW: May 9, 2017 (on day of PS4 NA release); Switch: JP: March 29, 2018; NA: June 5, 2018; EU: June 8, 2018; AU: June 15, 2018
- Genres: Life simulation, sandbox
- Mode: Single-player

Birthdays the Beginning (バースデイズ・ザ・ビギニング, Bāsudeizu za Biginingu) is a life simulation sandbox game developed by Arc System Works for PlayStation 4 and Microsoft Windows in 2017. A Nintendo Switch port, called Happy Birthdays (ハッピーバースデイズ, Happī Bāsudeizu), was released in 2018.

== Reception ==
Reception

Aggregate score
Aggregator	Score
Metacritic	(Switch) 71/100 (PS4) 65/100 (PC) 62/100

Review scores
Publication	Score
Destructoid	(PS4) 8/10
Famitsu	(PS4) 33/40
Game Informer	(PS4) 5/10
GameSpot	(PS4) 5/10
Hardcore Gamer	(PS4) 4/5
Nintendo Life	(Switch)
Nintendo World Report	(Switch) 6/10
PlayStation Official Magazine – UK	(PS4) 7/10
Polygon	(PS4) 6/10
Push Square	(PS4)
Common Sense Media	5/5 stars
Metro	(PS4) 6/10

The game received "mixed or average reviews" on all platforms according to the review aggregation website Metacritic. In Japan, Famitsu gave the PlayStation 4 version a score of 33 out of 40.
