= Jake Hunter Detective Story: Ghost of the Dusk =

2017 video game

- Developer: Arc System Works
- Publishers: Arc System Works, Aksys Games
- Series: Jake Hunter
- Platform: Nintendo 3DS
- Release: JP: August 31, 2017; NA: September 28, 2018
- Genres: Visual novel, adventure
- Mode: Single-player

Jake Hunter Detective Story: Ghost of the Dusk (Note: Japanese: 探偵 神宮寺三郎 Ghost of the Dusk, Hepburn: Tantei Jingūji Saburō Ghost of the Dusk) is a visual novel adventure game developed and published by Arc System Works and Aksys Games in the United States. The game is part of the Jake Hunter series of detective games. It was released for Nintendo 3DS on August 31, 2017, in Japan, and September 28, 2018, in the United States. It received mixed reviews from critics, who criticized the game's linearity and thought its gameplay was outdated.

== Reception ==
Reception

Aggregate score
Aggregator	Score
Metacritic	65/100

Review scores
Publication	Score
Adventure Gamers	2.5/5
Destructoid	6/10
Famitsu	7/10, 8/10, 8/10, 7/10
RPGFan	70/100

The game received an aggregate score of 65/100 on Metacritic, indicating "mixed or average reviews".

Tris Mendoza of RPGFan rated the game 70/100 points, calling it "criminally predictable and painfully easy", and saying it compared poorly to similar games such as Phoenix Wright: Ace Attorney - Spirit of Justice. While praising the game's music, he said that it could not save the game's story from "mediocrity".

CJ Andriessen of Destructoid rated the game 6/10 points, calling the game "not the best but not the worst". He noted that while the game opened teasing a haunted house supernatural element, it ultimately became less interesting as the game progressed and the premise was revealed as more conventional. He also criticized the inconsistencies between the American setting of the localization and the Japanese setting of the original. Calling the touch controls a surprisingly poor way to play the game, he stated the circle pad worked better. Additionally, he called questioning people too easy, with obvious answers. He summed the game up as having some "neat designs", but overall being "outdated and in desperate need of a refresh".

Pascal Tekaia of Adventure Gamers rated the game 2.5/5 stars, stating that it was unengaging and would not likely bring the series new fans in the West. Saying that the game's main case was interesting, he nevertheless called the side cases largely unrelated. Saying the game was rarely exciting, he criticized its handholding mentality.
