= Jake Hunter Detective Story: Memories of the Past =

2007 video game

- Original box art under the Jake Hunter: Detective Chronicles name
- Developer: WorkJam
- Publishers: Arc System Works, Aksys Games
- Series: Jake Hunter
- Platform: Nintendo DS
- Release: Detective Chronicles; July 19, 2007 (JP); June 11, 2008 (NA); Detective Story: Memories of the Past; May 26, 2009 (NA)
- Genres: Visual novel, adventure game
- Mode: Single-player

Jake Hunter Detective Story: Memories of the Past (Note: Known in Japan as Detective Jinguji Saburo DS ~Ancient Memories~ (Japanese: 探偵 神宮寺三郎DS ~いにしえの記憶~, Hepburn: Tantei Jingūji Saburō DS ~Inishie no Kioku~).) is a detective visual novel adventure game developed by WorkJam and published by Arc System Works in Japan and Aksys Games in the United States. It is part of the Jake Hunter series of detective games, and the first to be localized in the West. It was released on July 19, 2007, in Japan, and June 11, 2008, in the United States for Nintendo DS under the name Jake Hunter: Detective Chronicles. Marking the series' 20th anniversary, it includes remakes of the series' first five games as well as an additional case. Unlike its Japanese version, the initial Western version of the game lacked three of the cases, and was widely criticized for its poor localization. Its May 26, 2009 re-release received more positive reviews for its completely new translation and inclusion of the game's full content.

== Gameplay ==
The gameplay of both the game and its re-release involve solving crimes by going to various locations, collecting evidence and information, and then answering an end-of-day quiz in order to proceed the story. The cases are linear with losing impossible.

== Reception ==
Reception

Aggregate score
| Aggregator | Score |
|---|---|
| Metacritic | 47/100 (Chronicles); 72/100 (Story) |

Review scores
| Publication | Score |
|---|---|
| Adventure Gamers | 1/5 (Chronicles); 4/5 (Story) |
| Game Informer | 6.5/10 (Chronicles) |
| IGN | 6.4/10 (Chronicles); 7.9/10 (Story) |
| Nintendo Power | 5/10 (Chronicles); 6/10 (Story) |
| RPGFan | 69/100 (Chronicles); 73/100 (Story) |

The original Detective Chronicles received an aggregate score of 47/100 on Metacritic, indicating "generally unfavorable reviews". The game's re-release, Detective Story: Memories of the Past, received a Metacritic score of 72/100, indicating "mixed or average reviews".

Neal Chandran of RPGFan rated Detective Chronicles 69/100 points, comparing the game's localization to that of Revelations: Persona and calling it "hacked up for US audiences", even after games like Persona 3 had embraced their Japanese setting. He criticized the game's "Americanization", calling it "incongruent with the Japanese aspects of the game" such as a right-hand-side steering wheel and obvious Japanese signs. Stating that the game had no replay value, he called it a "rip off" even at its budget price due to its cut cases. He also called the cases "shallow" in comparison to similar games for the platform, like Hotel Dusk: Room 215, and the graphics "unimpressive" and "washed out" compared to the Ace Attorney series. In his subsequent review for Detective Story, he rated it 73/100 points, calling it a "major improvement" on its predecessor, but stating that his score for the former may have been generous. While praising the new translation, he criticized the decision to keep the games set in America, and noted that the gameplay remained linear and largely menu-based, with only a single ending to each case and unlimited retries. He continued to call the music "mostly forgettable".

Daemon Hatfield of IGN rated Detective Chronicles 6.4/10 points, saying it held the player's hand too much and could not compare to Phoenix Wright. Calling the game's characters "one-dimensional", he stated it was a "decent way to kill a few hours", but lacked effort or any humor, with artwork being generic and having only a single pose regardless of emotion, rather than scenario-appropriate art. Lucas M. Thomas of the same publication rated Detective Story 7.9/10 points, calling it polished and fun, and describing the Unleashed bonus episodes as "hilarious". He said he came away impressed with the game, saying it "does the introduction of Jake Hunter to America right".

Emily Morganti of Adventure Gamers rated Detective Chronicles 1/5 stars, calling it a "terribly-written snooze-fest", despite the Nintendo DS's potential for visual novels. Saying that the music was so repetitive she turned it off for most of the game, she also disliked the writing's constant emphasis on it being set in America, despite the Japanese version's setting. Describing the translation as poor, she said that the game "takes localization gaffes to the next level", and that the writing contained "a slew of errors any half-decent proofreader should have caught". Stating the characters "have zero personality", she summed up the game as not even worth it for free, and that its plastic case was of higher value than the game cartridge itself. Andrea Morstabilini of the same publication gave a comparatively higher review of 4/5 stars to Detective Story, saying it was "no surprise" that the game had been re-released, and calling the new version "clearly the game as it was originally intended to be". She described the new translation as "staying true to the gritty, grim realism of the setting without lapsing into triviality or flatness". Characterizing the game's setting as "depressingly harsh" in comparison to games like Phoenix Wright, she called it "refreshingly realistic", similar to early Police Quest games. Stating that she enjoyed all of the cases, she noted that one of them made her cry, demonstrating the game's immersion. However, she said that the game lacked interactivity, and was too straightforward for its own good.

Chris Hoffman of Nintendo Power gave Detective Chronicles a 5 out of 10 and criticized the story and the sloppy localization: "Although the serious tone and mysterious premises held my attention (especially since they offer a nice change of pace from similar games on DS), they're kept in check by dull characterization, inconsistent art, and typo-filled writing. The stories lack interesting twists and turns, and there's no sense of danger-you can't lose." Hoffman was nicer in his review of Detective Story, praising the writing and the Jake Hunter Unleashed bonus episodes, but he still had problems with the game's delivery of story content: "A lot of the events are predictable, and when unexpected twists do occur, there's rarely any sense of drama."
