= Arc System Works =

Japanese video game company

Arc System Works Co., Ltd.
- Native name: アークシステムワークス株式会社
- Romanized name: Āku Shisutemu Wākusu kabushiki gaisha
- Type: Kabushiki gaisha
- Industry: Video games
- Founded: May 12, 1988
- Founder: Minoru Kidooka
- Headquarters: Yokohama, Japan
- Key people: Minoru Kidooka; (President and CEO); Daisuke Ishiwatari; (Chief Creative Officer); Toshimichi Mori; (Chief Development Officer [2003 - 2022])
- Products: BlazBlue series; Double Dragon series; Guilty Gear series; Jake Hunter series; Kunio-kun series; Licensed: Dragon Ball FighterZ; Persona 4 Arena (Ultimax); Granblue Fantasy Versus (Rising); Marvel Tokon: Fighting Souls
- Revenue: ▲¥680 million
- Number of employees: 223 (December 2024)
- Website: arcsystemworks.com

Arc System Works Co., Ltd. (アークシステムワークス株式会社, Āku Shisutemu Wākusu kabushiki gaisha), commonly referred to as ArcSys, is a Japanese video game developer and publisher located in Yokohama. Founded by Minoru Kidooka in 1988, the company is known for arcade 2D fighting game franchises, including Guilty Gear and BlazBlue. They have also developed other fighting games using external licenses, including Dragon Ball FighterZ, Persona 4 Arena and Arena Ultimax, Granblue Fantasy Versus and Versus Rising, Marvel Tōkon: Fighting Souls, and others.

== History ==
The company was founded in January 1988 and incorporated as Arc Co., Ltd. in May. The company spent early years as a contract developer for Sega, Sammy, and Banpresto. It consisted at the time of around eight developers; most of whom had previously worked at Sega including founder Minoru Kidooka. It was renamed Arc System Works in 1991. In 1992 they developed a game for the Famicom called Pizza Pop!. The company produced a series of Sailor Moon video games for publisher Angel including Bishōjo Senshi Sailor Moon S: Jōgai Rantō!? Shuyaku Sōdatsusen which was the first fighting game it produced.

It published its first title in 1995 which was Exector for the PlayStation.

On June 11, 2015, the company acquired the intellectual properties of Technōs Japan, such as Double Dragon and Kunio-kun, from Million Co., Ltd. Even prior to its acquisition of Million's library, the company had been the publisher of Technōs' video games for Virtual Console in Japan. Following the transaction, the company took the publishing duties from Aksys Games for Virtual Console releases in North America, though some Technōs games were already published by Arc System Works.

On February 6, 2017, the company acquired the rights to the Jake Hunter, Theresia, Nazo no Jikenbo, and Koneko no Ie series from publisher WorkJam. On November 2, 2017, the company announced the establishment of a North American branch in Torrance, California, known as Arc System Works America, Inc.

In July 2024, Arc System Works opened a European branch in Paris, France. In October 2026, the company revealed that they would be opening a new studio in Shinjuku on November 2 of that year. The new studio will help Arc System Works develop a new fighting game title.

== Ludography ==
=== Games developed ===
Year	Title	Platform(s)	Publisher
1988	Final Lap	Family Computer	Namco
1988	Double Dragon	Master System	Sega
1989	Scramble Spirits	Master System	Sega
1989	Rolling Thunder	Family Computer	Namco
1989	Battle Out Run	Master System	Sega
1989	Vigilante	Master System	Sega
1990	Ghouls 'n Ghosts	Master System	Sega
1990	Michael Jackson's Moonwalker	Master System	Sega
1990	Code Name: Viper	Nintendo Entertainment System	Capcom
1990	Chiyonofuji no Ōichō	Family Computer	Face
1990	Operation Wolf	PC Engine	NEC Avenue
1990	Pengo	Game Gear	Sega
1990	Super Monaco GP	Master System	Sega
1990	Hissatsu Shigotonin	Family Computer	Banpresto
1990	SD Sengoku Bushō Retsuden: Rekka no Gotoku Tenka o Nusure!	Family Computer	Banpresto
1991	Battle Commander: Hachibushu Shura no Heihou	Super Famicom	Banpresto
1992	Pizza Pop!	Family Computer	Jaleco
1992	Kyōryū Sentai Zyuranger	Family Computer	Angel
1992	Great Battle Cyber	Family Computer	Banpresto
1992	Bishoujo Senshi Sailor Moon	Game Boy	Angel
1992	Cyber Spin	Super NES	Takara
1992	Ayrton Senna's Super Monaco GP II	Master System	Sega
1993	Battletoads	Game Gear, Genesis	Sega
1993	Suzuka 8 Hours	Super NES	Namco
1994	Gaia Saver	Super Famicom	Banpresto
1994	Bishōjo Senshi Sailor Moon	Mega Drive	Ma-Ba
1994	Bishōjo Senshi Sailor Moon S: Jōgai Rantō!? Shuyaku Sōdatsusen	Super Famicom	Angel
1995	Exector	PlayStation	
1995	Wizard's Harmony	PlayStation, Saturn	
1997	Wizard's Harmony 2	PlayStation, Saturn	
1998	Guilty Gear	PlayStation, PSP, PlayStation 3, PlayStation Vita, Windows, PlayStation 4, Nintendo Switch	Atlus (US) / Virgin Interactive (UK)
1998	Wizard's Harmony R	PlayStation	
1999	Prismaticallization	Dreamcast, PlayStation	
1999	Tanaka Torahiko no Uru Toraryuu Shogi	Dreamcast, PlayStation	
2000	Guilty Gear X	NAOMI, Dreamcast, PlayStation 2, Game Boy Advance, Windows	Sammy Studios
2000	Grappler Baki: Baki Saikyo Retsuden	PlayStation 2	Tomy
2001	Guilty Gear X Plus	PlayStation 2	Sammy Studios
2001	Digital Holmes	PlayStation 2	
2002	Guilty Gear X2	NAOMI, PlayStation 2	Sammy Studios
2003	Guilty Gear X Ver.1.5	Atomiswave	Sammy Studios
2003	Guilty Gear X2#Reload	NAOMI, PlayStation 2, Xbox, Windows, PSP	Sammy Studios
2004	Guilty Gear Isuka	Atomiswave, PlayStation 2, Xbox, Windows	Sammy Studios
2004	Dragon Ball Z: Supersonic Warriors	Game Boy Advance	Atari/Banpresto/Bandai
2005	Fist of the North Star	Atomiswave, PlayStation 2	Sega
2005	Dragon Ball Z: Supersonic Warriors 2	Nintendo DS	Atari/Banpresto/Bandai
2005	Guilty Gear XX Slash	NAOMI, PlayStation 2, PSP	Sammy Studios/SEGA
2006	Guilty Gear XX Accent Core	NAOMI, PlayStation 2, Wii	Sammy Studios/Aksys Games (US)
2007	Guilty Gear 2: Overture	Xbox 360, Windows	Arc System Works/Aksys Games/505 Games
2007	Battle Fantasia	Taito Type X2, PlayStation 3, Xbox 360, Windows	Arc System Works/Aksys Games/505 Games
2007	Hoshigami Remix	Nintendo DS	ASNetworks/Aksys Games/505 Games
2008	Guilty Gear XX Accent Core Plus	PlayStation 2, PSP, Wii, Xbox 360, PlayStation 3	Sammy Studios/Arc System Works(Wii)
2008	BlazBlue: Calamity Trigger	Taito Type X2, PlayStation 3, Xbox 360, Windows, PSP	Arc System Works/Aksys Games/PQube/Zen United
2008	Sengoku Basara X	System 246 / System 256, PlayStation 2	Capcom
2008	Super Dodgeball Brawlers	Nintendo DS	Arc System Works/Aksys Games
2008	Tantei Jinguji Saburo DS	Nintendo DS	Arc System Works/WorkJam
2008	Petit Copter	Wii	Aqua System
2008	Family Table Tennis	Wii	Aksys Games
2009	Diva Girls: Princess on Ice	Wii, DS	505 Games
2009	Family Glide Hockey	Wii	Aksys Games
2009	Family Pirate Party	Wii	Aksys Games
2009	Family Mini Golf	Wii	Aksys Games
2009	Family Slot Car Racing	Wii	Aksys Games
2009	Family Card Games	Wii	Aksys Games
2009	Family Grand Tennis	Wii	Aksys Games
2009	BlazBlue: Continuum Shift	Taito Type X2, PlayStation 3, Xbox 360	Arc System Works/Aksys Games/Arc System Works UK
2009	Animal Puzzle Adventure	DSiWare	
2009	Jazzy Billiards	Nintendo DSi	
2009	Othello	Windows, Nintendo 3DS, Nintendo DSi, Nintendo Switch, PSP, PlayStation Vita, Wii, Wii U	
2010	BlazBlue: Continuum Shift II	Taito Type X2, PSP, Nintendo 3DS	Arc System Works/Aksys Games/Arc System Works UK
2010	BlayzBloo: Super Melee Brawlers Battle Royale	DSiWare	
2010	Pro Jumper! Guilty Gear Tangent!?	DSiWare	
2011	Hard Corps: Uprising	PlayStation 3, Xbox 360	Konami
2011	Nurarihyon no Mago: Hyakki Ryouran Taisen	PlayStation 3, Xbox 360	Konami
2012	BlazBlue: Chronophantasma	Taito Type X2, PlayStation 3, PlayStation Vita	Arc System Works/Aksys Games
2012	Guilty Gear XX Accent Core Plus R	Arcade, PlayStation Vita, Windows, Nintendo Switch	Sammy Studios/Arc System Works (Steam)
2012	BlazBlue: Continuum Shift Extend	PlayStation Vita, PlayStation 3, Xbox 360, PSP, Windows	Arc System Works/Aksys Games/Arc System Works UK
2012	Persona 4 Arena	Taito Type X2, PlayStation 3, Xbox 360	Atlus
2012	Kyūkōsha no Shōjo	Nintendo 3DS	
2012	Phi Brain: Kizuna no Puzzle	PlayStation Portable	
2013	Persona 4 Arena Ultimax	Taito Type X2, PlayStation 3, Xbox 360, Nintendo Switch, PlayStation 4, Windows	Atlus/Sega
2013	Xblaze Code: Embryo	PlayStation 3, PlayStation Vita, Windows	Arc System Works/Aksys Games/Funbox Media
2013	Magical Beat	PlayStation Vita	
2013	Damascus Gear: Operation Tokyo	PlayStation Vita, PlayStation 4, Windows, Nintendo Switch	Arc System Works
2014	Guilty Gear Xrd -SIGN-	Sega RingEdge 2, PlayStation 3, PlayStation 4, Windows	Arc System Works/Aksys Games
2014	BlazBlue: Chronophantasma Extend	Taito Type X2 (as 2.0), PlayStation 3, PlayStation 4, Xbox One, PlayStation Vita, Windows	Arc System Works/Aksys Games
2014	Conveni Dream	Nintendo 3DS	
2014	Fantasy Hero: Unsigned Legacy	PlayStation Vita, Nintendo Switch	
2014	Slice It!	Nintendo 3DS	Arc System Works/Aksys Games
2015	Downtown Nekketsu Koushinkyoku: Soreyuke Daiundoukai All-Star Special	PlayStation 3	
2015	Family Tennis SP	Wii U	Aksys Games
2015	BlazBlue: Central Fiction	Taito Type X2, PlayStation 3, PlayStation 4, Playstation 5, Windows, Nintendo Switch	Arc System Works/Aksys Games/PQube
2015	Xblaze Lost: Memories	PlayStation 3, PlayStation Vita, Windows	Arc System Works/Aksys Games
2015	Dragon Ball Z: Extreme Butōden	Nintendo 3DS	Bandai Namco Entertainment
2016	Guilty Gear Xrd -REVELATOR-	Sega RingEdge 2, PlayStation 3, PlayStation 4, Windows	Arc System Works/Aksys Games/Sony Computer Entertainment
2016	Chase: Cold Case Investigations - Distant Memories	Nintendo 3DS	Arc System Works/Aksys Games
2016	Inferno Climber	PlayStation 4, Nintendo Switch, Windows	
2016	One Piece: Great Pirate Colosseum	Nintendo 3DS	Bandai Namco Entertainment
2016	River City Melee: Battle Royale SP	PlayStation 4, Windows	Arc System Works, H2 Interactive
2017	Double Dragon IV	PlayStation 4, Windows, Xbox One, Nintendo Switch	
2017	Simple Mahjong Online	Nintendo Switch	
2017	Birthdays the Beginning	PlayStation 4, Windows	NIS America
2017	Jake Hunter Detective Story: Ghost of the Dusk	Nintendo 3DS	Arc System Works/Orange
2017	Shephy	Android, iOS, Nintendo Switch, Windows	
2018	Dragon Ball FighterZ	PlayStation 4, Xbox One, Windows, Nintendo Switch, PlayStation 5, Xbox Series X/S	Bandai Namco Entertainment
2018	Happy Birthdays	Nintendo Switch	NIS America
2018	BlazBlue: Cross Tag Battle	PlayStation 4, Nintendo Switch, Windows, Arcade, Xbox One, Xbox Series X/S	Arc System Works/PQube
2019	Wizard's Symphony	PlayStation 4, Nintendo Switch	
2019	River City Melee Mach!!	PlayStation 4, Windows, Nintendo Switch	
2019	Stay Cool, Kobayashi-San!: A River City Ransom Story	PlayStation 4, Xbox One, Windows, Nintendo Switch	
2020	Code Shifter	PlayStation 4, Xbox One, Windows, Nintendo Switch	
2020	Granblue Fantasy Versus	PlayStation 4, Windows	Cygames/XSEED Games
2021	Guilty Gear Strive	PlayStation 4, PlayStation 5, Windows, Arcade, Xbox One, Xbox Series X/S, Nintendo Switch	Arc System Works/Bandai Namco Entertainment
2022	DNF Duel	PlayStation 4, PlayStation 5, Nintendo Switch, Windows	Nexon
2023	Granblue Fantasy Versus: Rising	PlayStation 4, PlayStation 5, Windows, Nintendo Switch 2	Cygames/XSEED Games
2024	Another Code: Recollection	Nintendo Switch	Nintendo
2024	Umamusume: Pretty Derby – Party Dash	PlayStation 4, Nintendo Switch, Windows	Cygames
2025	Dear me, I was...	Nintendo Switch 2, Android, iOS, Nintendo Switch, Windows	Arc System Works
2026	Goritaire	PlayStation 4, PlayStation 5, Nintendo Switch, Windows, Android, iOS	Arc System Works
2026	Damon and Baby	PlayStation 4, PlayStation 5, Nintendo Switch, Windows	Arc System Works
2026	Marvel Tōkon: Fighting Souls	PlayStation 5, Windows	Sony Interactive Entertainment
2026	Donutal	Windows	Arc System Works
2026	River City Survivors: Downtown of the Dead	Apple Arcade	Arc System Works

=== Games published ===
Year	Title	Platform(s)	Developers
2006	Castle of Shikigami III	Arcade, Wii, Xbox 360, Windows	Alfa System, Barnhouse Effect
2007	Hooked! Real Motion Fishing	Wii	SIMS
2009	Strikers 1945 Plus Portable	PSP	Psikyo
2011	Arcana Heart 3	PlayStation 3, Xbox 360	Examu, Team Arcana
2012	Chaos Code	PlayStation 3, PlayStation 4, Windows	FK Digital
2012	Go! Go! Kokopolo - Harmonious Forest Revenge	Nintendo DS	Tanukii Studios Limited
2013	Bit.Trip Saga	Nintendo 3DS	Gaijin Games
2014	Arcana Heart 3: Love Max!!!!!	Taito X2, PlayStation 3, PlayStation Vita, Windows	Examu, Team Arcana
2014	Tokyo Twilight Ghost Hunters	PlayStation 3, PlayStation Vita	Toybox Inc.
2014	Under Night In-Birth: Exe Late	PlayStation 3, Windows	Ecole Software, French Bread
2015	Skullgirls: 2nd Encore (Japan only)	PlayStation 4, PlayStation Vita	Reverge Labs/Lab Zero
2016	Tokyo Twilight Ghost Hunters: Daybreak Special Gigs	PlayStation 3, PlayStation Vita, PlayStation 4, Windows	Toybox Inc.
2017	Arcana Heart 3: Love Max Six Stars!!!!!	Taito Type X2, Windows	Examu, Team Arcana
2017	Melty Blood Actress Again Current Code	Windows	Type-Moon, French-Bread, Ecole Software
2017	Under Night In-Birth: Exe Late[st]	Sega RingEdge 2, PlayStation 3, PlayStation 4, PlayStation Vita, Windows	Ecole Software, French Bread
2017	Wonder Boy: The Dragon's Trap (Asia only)	PlayStation 4	Lizardcube
2017	DJMax Respect (Japan only)	PlayStation 4	Rocky Studio, Neowiz MUCA
2018	Daedalus: The Awakening of Golden Jazz	PlayStation 4, Nintendo Switch, Windows	Neilo Inc
2018	Resonance of Fate (Japan only)	PlayStation 4	tri-Ace
2018	World End Syndrome	Nintendo Switch, PlayStation 4	Toybox Games
2018	The Missing: J.J. Macfield and the Island of Memories	Nintendo Switch, PlayStation 4, Xbox One, Windows	White Owls Inc.
2019	Kill la Kill the Game: IF	Nintendo Switch, PlayStation 4, Windows	A+ Games
2019	River City Girls	Nintendo Switch, PlayStation 4, Xbox One, Windows, PlayStation 5	WayForward
2020	Under Night In-Birth: Exe Late[cl-r]	Nintendo Switch, PlayStation 4, Windows, Sega ALLS HX	Ecole Software, French Bread
2021	Kowloon High-School Chronicle	Nintendo Switch	Toybox Inc.
2021	Arcana Heart 3: Love Max Six Stars Xtend!!!!!	Windows, ex-Arcadia	Team Arcana
2021	River City Saga: Three Kingdoms	Nintendo Switch, PlayStation 4, Windows	A+ Games
2022	Ground Divers!	Nintendo Switch	Studio Tsuruhashi
2022	RWBY: Arrowfell	Nintendo Switch, PlayStation 4, PlayStation 5, Windows, Xbox One, Xbox Series X/S	WayForward
2022	River City Girls 2	Nintendo Switch, PlayStation 4, PlayStation 5, Windows, Xbox One, Xbox Series X/S	WayForward
2023	Under Night In-Birth II [Sys:Celes]	Nintendo Switch, PlayStation 4, PlayStation 5, Windows	French Bread
2024	Library of Ruina	Nintendo Switch, PlayStation 4	Project Moon
2024	River City Saga: Three Kingdoms Next	Nintendo Switch, PlayStation 4, Windows	A+ Games, R-Force Entertainment
2025	Hunter × Hunter: Nen × Impact	Nintendo Switch, PlayStation 5, Windows	Eighting
2025	Super Technos World: River City & Technos Arcade Classics	Nintendo Switch, PlayStation 5, Windows	Intense
2025	Double Dragon Revive	Nintendo Switch, PlayStation 4, PlayStation 5, Xbox One, Xbox Series X/S, Windows	Yuke's
2025	Bubble Bobble Sugar Dungeons	Nintendo Switch, PlayStation 5, Windows	Taito
2026	Puzzle Bobble Everybubble!	Windows	Taito
2026	River City Saga: Journey to the West	Nintendo Switch, PlayStation 5, Windows	UnitePlus
2026	Qliphah in Providence’s Shadow	Nintendo Switch, PlayStation 5, Windows	UnitePlus
2026	Demon’s Night Fever	Nintendo Switch, PlayStation 5, Windows	Drecom, SuperNiche
