= Damascus Gear: Operation Tokyo =

2013 video game

- Developer: Arc System Works
- Publisher: Arc System Works
- Platforms: PlayStation Vita, PlayStation 4, Microsoft Windows, Nintendo Switch
- Release: PS Vita: JP: December 25, 2013; NA: March 24, 2015; PAL: April 28, 2015; PlayStation 4: JP: February 22, 2017; WW: May 31, 2017; Windows; August 8, 2017; Nintendo Switch; March 1, 2018
- Genre: Action role-playing game
- Mode: Single-player

Damascus Gear: Operation Tokyo, known in Japan as Damascus Gear: Tokyo Shisen (ダマスカスギヤ -東京始戦-, Damasukasu Giya -Tokyo Shisen-), is an action role-playing game developed and published by Arc System Works for PlayStation Vita on December 25, 2013, in Japan, and in 2015 elsewhere. A version of the game, called Damascus Gear: Operation Tokyo - HD Edition (Damascus Gear: Tokyo Shisen - HD Edition (ダマスカスギヤ -東京始戦- HD Edition, Damasukasu Giya -Tokyo Shisen- HD Edition) in Japan), was released for PlayStation 4 and Microsoft Windows (via Steam) in 2017. The game was ported to Nintendo Switch via Nintendo eShop in 2018.

== Reception ==
Reception

Aggregate score
Aggregator	Score
Metacritic	(PS4) 70/100 (Vita) 59/100 (Switch) 58/100

Review scores
Publication	Score
4Players	37%
Famitsu	28/40
Hardcore Gamer	3/5
Nintendo Life	6/10
Nintendo World Report	6.5/10
Push Square	6/10
RPGamer	3/5

The game received "mixed or average reviews" on all platforms according to the review aggregation website Metacritic.
