= Jake Hunter =

- Genre: Adventure game
- Developers: Data East; WorkJam; Marvelous Interactive; Arc System Works; Orange; Neilo
- Publishers: Data East; Media Rings; WorkJam; Expris; Arc System Works; Aksys Games
- Artists: Katsuya Terada; JUNNY; Yoshio Sugiura
- Writers: Kazushige Nojima; Kazutaka Kodaka; Mitsue Kaneko
- Composers: Seiichi Hamada; Katsuhiko Nakamichi; Tomoyoshi Sato
- Platforms: Family Computer Disk System, Nintendo Entertainment System, Sega Saturn, PlayStation, PlayStation 2, Game Boy Advance, Nintendo DS, PlayStation Portable, Virtual Console, Nintendo 3DS, PlayStation 4, Nintendo Switch, Windows, DMM GAMES
- First release: Shinjuku Chūō Kōen Satsujin Jiken; April 24, 1987
- Latest release: Tantei Jingūji Saburō New Order; July 31, 2019

Jake Hunter, known in Japan as Tantei Jingūji Saburō (探偵神宮寺三郎; "Detective Saburō Jingūji"), is a mystery adventure game series originally developed and published by Data East in 1987. The property would transfer to WorkJam after its seventh instalment, and later to Arc System Works.

The first associated game to receive an English language release was Tantei Jingūji Saburō DS: Inishie no Kioku, retitled and released in North America on June 11, 2008, by Aksys Games in truncated form as Jake Hunter: Detective Chronicles. The game was re-released on May 26, 2009, as Jake Hunter Detective Story: Memories of the Past, containing the originally localised three cases with new translations, plus three further cases, and a large number of unlockables including comics. No further releases would be announced until July 1, 2017, when Aksys Games revealed they would be bringing over Tantei Jingūji Saburō: Ghost of the Dusk in 2018. A prequel game, given the branding Alternate Jake Hunter internationally, was localised internally and released in 2019 with original character names and settings preserved.

== History ==
According to Enterbrain's Famitsu, the Tantei Jingūji Saburō franchise had sold over 2,220,000 units at the time of its twentieth anniversary, making it one of the longest running and best-selling Japanese adventure game series in history. There are nineteen main series entries, complemented by a 25-game mobile sub-series and various examples of tie-in media. A recurrent series tradition takes titles from popular music as names for instalments, with frequent reference made to works of Kenji Sawada.

=== Family Computer ===
The first game of the series, Shinjuku Chūō Kōen Satsujin Jiken (新宿中央公園殺人事件; Shinjuku Central Park Murder Case), was released in 1987 by Data East for the Family Computer Disk System. Following in the style of Yuji Horii's popular Famicom-ported adventure games, the "command selection" style games featured advanced graphics, sound effects, and distinct hardboiled scenarios to set themselves apart from contemporaries. The series employed a number of advanced game mechanics, developing techniques which would later find popularity in the industry at large. Time played an important role in the first game, with each command selected by the player causing a certain amount of in-game time to elapse; failure to solve the mystery during the allotted time period resulting in a bad ending. This time system would later be revived in the series' 7th installment. The scenario for the series' 3rd and 4th installments was written by a fledgling Kazushige Nojima, who added segments following the secondary lead which alternated on a predetermined basis.

=== Fifth generation consoles ===
Production was halted after the 4th installment, but would be revived internally when Data East took on series fan Tatsuya Saito. Saito would become scenario writer for the 5th game in the series, directed by Eiichi Nishiyama, imminent heir to the role of series producer, and released on the PlayStation and Sega Saturn in 1996. This fifth entry would see several developments on the original games made possible by the use of the CD-ROM: an update to the series' graphics and sound, including an opening movie featuring an animated prelude and voice acting for the first time; a "zapping" system which allowed different branches of the story to be played by way of alternating characters; 3D-rendered mini games; and the inaugural installment of a sub-series known in Japan as the Mystery Casebook games (Jake Hunter Unleashed in English releases), featuring super-deformed caricatures of the main trio encountering small-scale mysteries demanding careful logic-puzzle gameplay, which would be included alongside mainline games.

Most of these features would become recurrent in the series, with the 6th installment, written by Hirotaka Inaba, replacing the previous game's stylised character design with a painted realist style rendered by original character designer Katsuya Terada, and adding a new "password" mechanic, involving hidden codes in the main game which could be used to unlock bonus content. Bearing the newly christened series subtitle "Detective Adventure Game", both this game and the next, released exclusively for PlayStation, would feature opening movies directed by Shimako Satō.

=== Sixth generation consoles ===
In 1999, a financially troubled Data East licensed out the series to WorkJam, to which Nishiyama's "Team Jingūji" would transfer when Data East went bankrupt in 2003. The transition between studios marked a shift in game design, story paths becoming once more linear and perspective shifts scripted, setting the formula for later games in the series. With WorkJam founder Yutaka Kaminaga finding previous scenario writers unavailable, writing credit for the series' eighth installment, released for PlayStation 2 in 2002, fell to Mitsue Kaneko. The resultant game featured a number of peripheral references to the contemporary Grasshopper Manufacture debut The Silver Case.

The series continued at WorkJam with a further game for the PS2 and reimaginings of the Famicom games released as the inauguration of a line of mobile phone applications. The final game of the generation, co-developed by Marvelous Interactive for the Game Boy Advance, marked the series debut on handheld platforms.

=== Seventh generation consoles ===
Beginning with a special 20th anniversary release for the Nintendo DS, WorkJam would work with Arc System Works in development of console games, now released exclusively on handheld platforms, predominantly in the form of the Tantei Jingūji Saburō Detective Story compilation line, with the addition of a PlayStation Portable release similar in form to earlier PlayStation installments. WorkJam licensed a series of PlayStation Game Archives releases of the original Data East games to Expris, and continued their mobile game line, featuring contributions from writers such as then-Flagship affiliate Kazutaka Kodaka, to a total of twenty-four releases before it was retired.

=== Eighth-generation consoles ===
In 2011, WorkJam began to wind down production, with full responsibilities for the ongoing development of a special 25th-anniversary game for the Nintendo 3DS falling to Arc System Works. Several WorkJam staff, including Nishiyama and Kaneko, would form a new studio, Orange, while rights to various company properties including the Tantei Jingūji Saburō series passed to Expris. For the next five years the series would remain largely dormant, aside from Game Archives rereleases of WorkJam's two PS2 games from Expris, and a cameo by the title character in Inuwashi Urabure Tantei to Ojou-sama Keiji no Ikebukuro Jiken Fairu, a mobile game developed by Orange and scored by longtime series composer Seiichi Hamada.

In 2017, Arc System Works announced that plans for a 30th-anniversary revival had led to its obtaining of exclusive rights to Expris' WorkJam-inherited properties at the end of the previous year. Following this, the company worked with Orange and Neilo to publish several titles for handheld and home consoles, while exploring new avenues for PC delivery and reviving the mobile line for smart devices.

== Characters ==
The main character of the series is Jake Hunter (known in Japan as Saburō Jingūji (神宮寺三郎, Jingūji Saburō)), a thirty-something (29 for the first five installments) private investigator who operates a detective agency in the Tripudio district of the fictional American city of Aspicio (Kabukichō, Shinjuku in the Japanese original). He was born the third son of a wealthy business enterprise owner, but chose to travel to New York City during his youth to work as an assistant detective. He is a heavy smoker, and often assembles his thoughts with the help of a Marlboro cigarette. According to his in-game profile, his favorite alcoholic beverage is cognac, and he drives a green Mini Cooper.

Hunter is persistently accompanied in his investigations by Yulia Marks (known in Japan as Yōko Misono (御苑洋子, Misono Yōko)), his polyglot assistant, and often collaborates with his old friend Scott "King" Kingsley (known in Japan as Sanzō "Kuma-san" Kumano (熊野参造, Kumano Sanzō)), a middle-aged inspector with the city police.

=== Voice acting ===
Voice acting was first used in certain game scenes in the 5th installment, and has been implemented in most subsequent releases, excluding those released for mobile, GBA and DS. Jingūji has been voiced by Yukimasa Kishino, Akio Ōtsuka, Jūrōta Kosugi, and Kaoru Katō; Yōko by Tsumugi Ōsawa, Yōko Saitō, Fumiko Orikasa, Kazue Nakamoto, Seiko Yoshida, and Mamiko Noto; and Sanzō by Fumihiko Tachiki, Kōji Ishii, Masaaki Tsukada, and Naomi Otome.

== List of media ==
#	Title	Release date	Developer	Platform	Synopsis
1	Shinjuku Chūō Kōen Satsujin Jiken 新宿中央公園殺人事件; Shinjuku Central Park Murder Case	JP: April 24, 1987	Data East	Disk System	The strangled corpse of a popular hostess is discovered at the Shinjuku Central Park. A doctor, a homeless man and someone else may know something.
2	Yokohama-kō Renzoku Satsujin Jiken 横浜港連続殺人事件; Yokohama Port Serial Murder Case	JP: February 26, 1988	Data East	Family Computer	The search for a missing girlfriend results in the discovery of hidden firearms, and the police begin to suspect a link with an underground trafficking organization.
3	Kiken na Futari Zenpen 危険な二人 前編; Dangerous Duo Former Part	JP: December 9, 1988	Data East	Disk System	Jingūji visits a race circuit at the invitation of one of Yōko's friends. A motorcycle racer crashes at the circuit, but a different racer's body is recovered from the crash site.
3	Kiken na Futari Kōhen 危険な二人 後編; Dangerous Duo Latter Part	JP: February 10, 1989	Data East	Disk System	Jingūji visits a race circuit at the invitation of one of Yōko's friends. A motorcycle racer crashes at the circuit, but a different racer's body is recovered from the crash site.
4	Toki no Sugiyuku Mama ni... 時の過ぎゆくままに... Let Time Pass By...	JP: September 28, 1990	Data East	Family Computer	Jingūji investigates a burglary at a mansion, while Yōko searches for the home of a young boy. Both cases appear simple, until they become one.
5	Mikan no Rupo 未完のルポ; The Unfinished Report	JP: November 29, 1996	Data East	PlayStation; Sega Saturn	An overseas package sent by a journalist acquaintance of Jingūji's arrives at the agency, containing a small key. Collaborating with a new ally, he sets out in search of a way to uncover its meaning.
6	Yume no Owari ni 夢の終わりに; At the Dream's End	JP: April 23, 1998	Data East	PlayStation; Sega Saturn	Jingūji is tormented by hideous dreams of his past. The mystery begins as Yōko unwittingly decides to pursue a request.
N/A	Tantei Jingūji Saburō Early Collection	JP: August 5, 1999	Data East	PlayStation	A compilation of the early games released for the Family Computer and Family Computer Disk System
7	Tomoshibi ga Kienu Ma ni 灯火が消えぬ間に; While the Lights Remain	JP: November 25, 1999	Data East	PlayStation	An injured young man suddenly takes refuge from yakuza at the agency, complicating the investigation of two cases, as each of the separate events are gradually woven together.
8	Innocent Black	JP: October 4, 2002	WorkJam	PlayStation 2	Jingūji is asked to search for the missing daughter of the director of a hospital where he had received treatment. This small case gradually expands to revive a deep and complex mystery.
9	KIND OF BLUE	JP: April 22, 2004	WorkJam	PlayStation 2	Lonely and bored after several months without any cases, Jingūji gladly returns to work when the Kantō Meiji group requests the investigation of a certain individual. A direct sequel to the previous game.
10	Shiroi Kage no Shōjo 白い影の少女; The Girl with White Shadow	JP: January 27, 2005	WorkJam; Marvelous Interactive	Game Boy Advance	When Jingūji attends a friend's funeral, the departed man's mother asks him to investigate a missing person, while Kumano approaches him with the urban myth of "Yū-chan".
11	Inishie no Kioku いにしえの記憶; The Ancient Memory Jake Hunter: Detective Chronicles Jake Hunter Detective Story: Memories of the Past	JP: July 19, 2007; NA: June 11, 2008; NA: May 26, 2009	WorkJam; Arc System Works	Nintendo DS	Jake is arrested by the police for a crime he did not commit; a young man named Ken seems the only person who might prove his innocence. This release marks the series' 20th anniversary, and includes the first five games from the original mobile series. Unlike the Japanese version, the initial U.S. version, titled "Jake Hunter: Detective Chronicles", only contains the first three cases and many of the extras were cut from the game. The game was later rereleased as "Jake Hunter Detective Story: Memories of the Past", unedited and retranslated.
12	Kienai Kokoro きえないこころ; Unvanquished Spirit	JP: April 24, 2008	WorkJam; Arc System Works	Nintendo DS	Jingūji is asked to investigate the suicide of an elementary school girl from 20 years ago. When he visits her school, he meets the school principal who demands the investigation of another new case... Also contains five games from the original mobile series (No.6–No.10)
13	Fuserareta Shinjitsu 伏せられた真実; Withheld Truth	JP: March 29, 2009	WorkJam; Arc System Works	Nintendo DS	After finding himself momentarily caught in the limelight, Jingūji returns to his craft when a kidnapper specifically requests the involvement of "Detective J". Also contains five games from the original mobile series (No.11–No.15)
14	Hai to Daiyamondo 灰とダイヤモンド; Ashes and Diamonds	JP: September 17, 2009	WorkJam; Arc System Works	PlayStation Portable	Looking into an inheritance dispute, Jingūji ends up investigating five seemingly unconnected cases and discovers a conspiracy.
15	Akai Chō 赤い蝶; Red Butterfly	JP: September 30, 2010	WorkJam; Arc System Works	Nintendo DS	Following a fresh wave of violence, Jingūji sets out on the trail of a terrorist known as "Red Butterfly" who was responsible for a series of bombings twenty years ago. Also contains five games from the original mobile series, previously released as DSiWare (No.16–No.20)
16	Fukushū no Rondo 復讐の輪舞; The Rondo of Revenge	JP: June 28, 2012	WorkJam; Arc System Works	Nintendo 3DS	Pursued by both sides of the law, Jingūji finds himself juggling his own survival and his search for the truth. An atypical game featuring several unique mechanics, released to mark the series' 25th anniversary
N/A	Tantei Jingūji Saburō Oldies	JP: June 26, 2017	Arc System Works; Orange	iOS; Android	App collecting remasters of games in the original mobile series (No.2-No.20)
17	GHOST OF THE DUSK Jake Hunter Detective Story: Ghost of the Dusk	JP: August 31, 2017; NA: September 28, 2018; EU: September 28, 2018	Arc System Works; Orange	Nintendo 3DS	The discovery of a dead vagrant in a run-down mansion rapidly spirals into a decades-old investigation. The title also contains the final four games from the original mobile series (No.21–No.24)
18	Prism of Eyes	JP: August 9, 2018	Arc System Works; Orange	PlayStation 4 Nintendo Switch; DMM GAMES	A trio of standalone stories starring each of the three series regulars, alongside remakes of ten games from the original mobile series (No.4, 6, 7, 8, 11, 12, 14, 16, 18, 19)
SP	Daedalus: The Awakening of Golden Jazz Alternate Jake Hunter - Daedalus: The Awakening of Golden Jazz	JP: December 13, 2018; NA: May 23, 2019	Arc System Works; Neilo	PlayStation 4 Nintendo Switch; Windows	A young Saburō Jingūji heads to New York prior to joining the Tokyo Metropolitan Police after the death of his grandfather. A prequel to the series, tying in loosely to the sixth game.
N/A	Tantei Jingūji Saburō New Order	JP: July 31, 2019	Arc System Works; Orange	iOS; Android	App for distribution of games in a new mobile series

=== Mobile series ===
The mobile games began development under WorkJam for flip phones in 2003. The first four games were remakes of the original Famicom games, featuring (often significant) reworking of their stories. Following Arc System Works' acquisition of the series in 2017, the original games were collected in a smartphone app, and the line relaunched with a new series beginning in 2019.

#	Japanese title	English title
01	Shinjuku Chūō Kōen Satsujin Jiken 新宿中央公園殺人事件; Shinjuku Central Park Murder Mystery	The Petty Murder of a Fragile Heart (on DS)
02	Yokohama-kō Renzoku Satsujin Jiken 横浜港連続殺人事件; Yokohama Port Serial Murder Mystery	Seaside City Conspiracy (on DS)
03	Kiken na Futari 危険な二人; Dangerous Duo	Crash and Burn (on DS)
04	Toki no Sugiyuku Mama Ni... 時の過ぎゆくままに... Let Time Pass By...	As Time Goes By (on DS)
05	Akai Me no Tora アカイメノトラ; The Red-Eyed Tiger	The Red-Eyed Tiger (on DS)
06	Rokumai no Hankō; 6枚の犯行; The Six Sheets of Crime	—
07	Bōen wo Sagase! 亡煙を捜せ! Search for the Dying Smoke!	—
08	Aoi Me no Ryū アオイメノリュウ; The Blue-Eyed Dragon	—
09	Kito no Yoru キトの夜; The Night of Quito	—
10	Shikaku no Wana 四角の罠; The Square Trap	—
11	Inu to Yobareta Otoko イヌと呼ばれた男; The Man Who Was Called a Dog	—
12	Futairo no Shōjo ふた色の少女; The Two-Colored Girl	—
13	Inochi Tatsu Kokugen 命絶つ刻限; Prophecy of Death	—
14	Takusareta Yubiwa 託された指輪; The Entrusted Ring	—
15	Shingi no Hazama 真偽の狭間; Between Truth and Lie	—
16	Tsubaki no Yukue 椿のゆくえ; Whereabouts of the Camellia	—
17	Akenai Yoru ni 明けない夜に; In Night without Daybreak	—
18	Kadan no Itte 果断の一手; The Decisive Move	—
19	Rensasuru Noroi 連鎖する呪い; The Linking Curse	—
20	Naki Ko no Shōzō 亡き子の肖像; The Portrait of a Dead Child	—
21	Onihimeden 鬼姫伝; Demon Princess Legend	Legend of the Demon Princess (on 3DS)
22	Ai Yue ni 愛ゆえに; In the Case of Love	For Love (on 3DS)
23	Wasurenagusa no Omoi 勿忘草の想い; Sentiment of the Forget-Me-Not	Forget-me-not (on 3DS)
24	Yurameku Hitotose 揺らめくひととせ; One Wavering Year	Four Seasons (on 3DS)
25	Giwaku no Ace 疑惑のエース; The Suspicious Ace	—

=== Other media ===
The series has been accompanied by a plethora of tie-in books, the first of which, a choose-your-own-adventure style gamebook for young adults, was released in 1988. After the series revival at Data East, Tatsuya Saito would pen a prequel novel documenting the first meeting between Jingūji and Kumano. A further novel would be published in 2000, followed by a novelisation of the eighth game. Another prequel, telling a story set during Jingūji's schooldays, was published by Dengeki Bunko in 2004, followed by a brief sequence of releases at Sesame Books, ending in 2007.

Manga adaptations of the third and sixth games were previously made available online, and several game guides were published prior to the series' shift toward handheld platforms.

Several soundtrack CDs have also been released, featuring a range of music from across the series composed by series stalwart Seiichi Hamada and others. A Drama CD featuring three short vignettes was included with early copies of the sixth game.

The first four games in the series were released on the Wii's Virtual Console in Japan.
