= Media Rings =

Japanese publishing company

- Company type: Defunct
- Industry: Video games
- Founded: October 1989
- Defunct: April 2007
- Headquarters: Akasaka 8-5-32 Tokyo
- Number of employees: 50 (former)
- Website: Official website at the Wayback Machine (archived 2009-03-19)

Media Rings Corporation (メディアリング) was a Japanese music, video game, and software publishing company located in Akasaka, Tokyo. Founded in October 1989 as a music and video packaging firm, it since became a distributor and producer of electronic entertainment. The company has been involved with several video game developers on a number of systems beginning with the PC Engine in 1990, and was primarily known for their Zero4 Champ racing game series, as well as the Game Boy Advance title Lunar Legend. The company's name is sometimes incorrectly translated as "Magic Rings" by English websites. It has been officially dissolved as of April 2007.

== Video games ==
=== Published ===
PC Engine

- Spin Pair (1990)
- Spiral Wave (1991)
- Zero4 Champ (1991)
- Toilet Kids (1992)

PC Engine CD

- Tecmo World Cup Super Soccer (1992)
- Zero4 Champ II (1993)

Super Famicom

- Zero4 Champ RR (1994)
- Ballz (1995)
- Zero4 Champ RR-Z (1995)

Sega Saturn

- Tactical Fighter (1997)
- Zero4 Champ: DooZy-J Type R (1997)

PlayStation

- Suzumepai Yuugi '99: Tanuki no Kawasanyou (1998)
- Yuugen Kaisha Chikyuu Boueitai: Earth Defenders Corporation (1999)
- Mahjong Toriadama Kikou (2000)
- Super Bass Fishing (2000)
- Tantei Jinguuji Saburo: Touka ga Kienu Mani (2000)
- Tantei Jinguuji Saburo: Yume no Owarini (2000)
- Runabout 2 (2000)
- Kowloon Jou (2000)
- Tantei Jinguuji Saburo: Mikan no Report (2000)
- Phat Air: Extreme Snowboarding (2000)
- Superstar Dance Club (2000)
- Tantei Jinguuji Saburo Early Collection (2000)
- Doki Doki Poyatachio!! (Cancelled)

Game Boy Advance

- Mugen Kinogyou Zero Tours (2001)
- Saibara Rieko no Dendou Mahjong (2001)
- Wizardry: The Summoning (2001)

=== Developed ===
PC Engine

- Boxyboy (1990)
- Zero4 Champ (1991)

PC Engine CD

- Zero4 Champ II (1993)

Super Famicom

- Zero-4 Champ RR (1994)

Game Boy Advance

- Lunar Legend (2002)

== Animation ==
=== Published ===
- Figures of Happiness (1990–1991)
- Burn Up W (1996)
