= Evolution Championship Series =

Annual United States fighting game tournament

- Logo
- Formerly: Battle by the Bay
- Sport: Fighting games
- Founded: 1996
- Founder: Tom "inkblot" Cannon, Tony "Ponder" Cannon, Joey "MrWizard" Cuellar, Seth "S-Kill" Killian
- Most recent season: Evo 2026
- Owner: Public Investment Fund (RTS)
- Country: United States
- Most recent champions: Vegas: SF6: Saul "MenaRD" Mena II; T8: Arslan "Arslan Ash" Siddique"; 2XKO: Jo'siah "HIKARI" Miller; Rivals 2: Justin "Plup" McGrath; GGST: "RedDitto"; GBVSR: Mathieu "Kojicoco" Fardet; CotW: Zheng "Xiaohai" Zhuojun; Invincible VS: "Heiho"; VSAV: "Kaji"; BBCF: "Fukku"; UNI2: Izayah "BigBlack" Davis; VF5REVO: Avery "GentlemanThief" Carey; Japan: SF6: Eisuke Yamaguchi; T8: Min-Kyu "iKARi" Kim; GGST: "Tyurara"; GBVSR: "Kasausagi"; CotW: Zheng "Xiaohai" Zhuojun; 2XKO: Jo'siah "HIKARI" Miller; VSAV: "Kaji"; KOFXV: Masanobu "M'" Murakami; VF5REVO: "Virgo"; MBTL: "Yutta"; HnK: "K.I"; UNI2: "Oushuu-Hittou"; France: SF6: Kevin "Dual Kevin" Barrios; T8: Sang-Hyun "Jeondding" Jeon; Tōkon: Atir "Zando" Yosef; 2XKO: "bleed"; ATL: Martín "Pepe Uehara" Portela; GGST: Shamar "Nitro" Hinds; CotW: Goichi "GO1" Kishida; GBVSR: "Zangief_Dream"
- Most titles: Justin Wong (9)
- Qualification: None (open)
- Website: www.evo.gg

The Evolution Championship Series, commonly known as Evo, is an American, Saudi-owned annual esports event that focuses exclusively on fighting games. The tournaments are completely open and use the double elimination format. As with Super Battle Opera, contestants travel from all over the world to participate, including gaming hubs such as Japan, South Korea and Pakistan. The first Evolution was originally held as a Super Street Fighter II Turbo and Street Fighter Alpha 2 tournament called the Battle by the Bay. It changed its name to Evo in 2002. Every successive tournament has seen an increase of attendees. It has been held at various venues across the Las Vegas Valley since 2005, while spin-off events have since been held in Japan and France.

The event was originally founded by Tom Cannon; in 2021, Evo was acquired by a joint venture between Sony Interactive Entertainment and the Endeavor-backed agency RTS. In 2025, Sony sold its stake to the Indian company Nodwin Gaming, while Saudi Arabia's Public Investment Fund subsequently acquired RTS. In turn, RTS acquired Nodwin's stake in Evo in February 2026, placing it solely under Saudi ownership.

== History ==
Evo was founded by Tom Cannon, also known for his work on Shoryuken.com, a fighting game website. The tournament started as "Battle by the Bay", a 40-man Super Street Fighter II Turbo and Street Fighter Alpha 2 tournament in 1996 in Sunnyvale, California. The event eventually moved to its recurring venue in the Las Vegas Valley, Nevada. The event changed its name to Evolution Championship Series, or EVO for short, in 2002. Over time, the tournament grew, recording over one thousand participants in 2009.

Originally the tournament used arcade cabinets, but in 2004 the decision was made to move all games over to their console versions, to a large amount of controversy. During the transition to games on the seventh generation consoles, most games were played on a PlayStation 3, though Evo 2014 ran most games on the Xbox 360. Aside from the official tournaments, there is also a "BYOC" ("bring your own console") area in which many different games are played and side tournaments are held.

=== 1996–2003: Tournament beginnings and re-branding ===
B3: Battle by the Bay was organized by Tom "inkblot" Cannon, Tony "Ponder" Cannon, Joey "MrWizard" Cuellar, and Seth "S-Kill" Killian, and held in the Golfland arcade hall in Sunnyvale, California. The tournament had 40 contenders mostly from the United States, though B3 also featured players from Canada and Kuwait. B3 featured a Super Street Fighter II Turbo and Street Fighter Alpha 2 tournament.

The B4 Street Fighter Championships were held on July 15–16, 2000, in Folsom, California. B4 introduced several new Capcom fighting games to the roster: Street Fighter Alpha 3, Street Fighter III: 3rd Strike, and Marvel vs. Capcom 2: New Age of Heroes. The newly released Marvel vs. Capcom 2 was the first non-Street Fighter game to be included, and a precedent for the tournament to branch out to other games. The Capcom Versus series has since had a large presence in the Battle of the Bay and Evolution Championship Series events.

Held in August 2001 in Folsom, California, the B5 Championships was attended by a much larger international crowd, particularly from Japan. Capcom vs. SNK: Millennium Fight 2000 made its introduction in the tournament roster at B5, and Marvel vs. Capcom 2 was again a headliner of the event, being described by TechTV as "the hottest arcade fighting game of the season."

In 2002, the event became formally known as its current name, "Evo". Evo 2002 took place on August 9, 2002, at the University of California, Los Angeles.

=== 2004–08: Change to consoles, Moment 37 and EVO Circuit ===
Evo 2004 took place at California State Polytechnic University, Pomona in Southern California from July 29 to August 1. The tournament amassed approximately 700 competitors from over 30 countries to compete in over nine different games. The games featured included Super Street Fighter II Turbo, Street Fighter III: 3rd Strike, Marvel vs. Capcom 2, Capcom vs. SNK 2, Virtua Fighter 4: Evolution, Guilty Gear XX, Soulcalibur II, Tekken 4, and Tekken Tag Tournament.

Evo 2004 used home consoles for most of their tournament games instead of arcade cabinets, with the only exception being 3rd Strike which used the more traditional arcade cabinets. Evo 2004 was the birthplace of "Evo Moment #37". During the Street Fighter III: 3rd Strike tournament, Daigo Umehara (playing as Ken), while facing Justin Wong (using Chun-Li), successfully parried one of Chun-Li's "Super Moves" while having very little health left and then countered with his own, winning the match. This highlight became highly influential within the fighting game community.

2005 was the first year Evo was held at the Green Valley Ranch casino and hotel in Las Vegas.

Evo 2006 took place at the Red Rock Resort Spa and Casino in Las Vegas. 2006 was the first year that Capcom gave its official, public support of the Evolution tournaments. Traditionally, Evo has only included fighting games, but in 2006 it included Mario Kart DS in its lineup. The fighting games featured were Dead or Alive 4, Guilty Gear XX Slash, and Hyper Street Fighter II.

Evo 2007, officially called Evo World 2007, took place from August 24 to 26 at the Green Valley Ranch, in Las Vegas. Throughout the year there were several other tournaments held throughout the US bearing the Evo name. The game roster had eight games, Street Fighter III: 3rd Strike, Capcom vs. SNK 2, Virtua Fighter 5, Marvel vs. Capcom 2, Super Street Fighter II Turbo, Tekken 5: Dark Resurrection, Guilty Gear XX Λ Core, and Super Smash Bros. Melee.

Evo 2008 took place at the Tropicana Las Vegas on the Las Vegas Strip. from August 8 to 10. The tournament would feature six games within its official roster: Capcom vs. SNK 2, Tekken 5: Dark Resurrection, Street Fighter III: 3rd Strike, Super Smash Bros. Brawl, Super Street Fighter II Turbo, and Marvel vs. Capcom 2. The Brawl tournament was widely criticized for its ruleset, which allowed items on and saw a relatively unknown player defeat Ken Hoang.

Evo 2008 also allowed attendees a preview of BlazBlue: Calamity Trigger, Street Fighter IV, Super Street Fighter II Turbo HD Remix, and Tatsunoko vs. Capcom.

=== 2009–13: Street Fighter IV, live streams, and record numbers ===
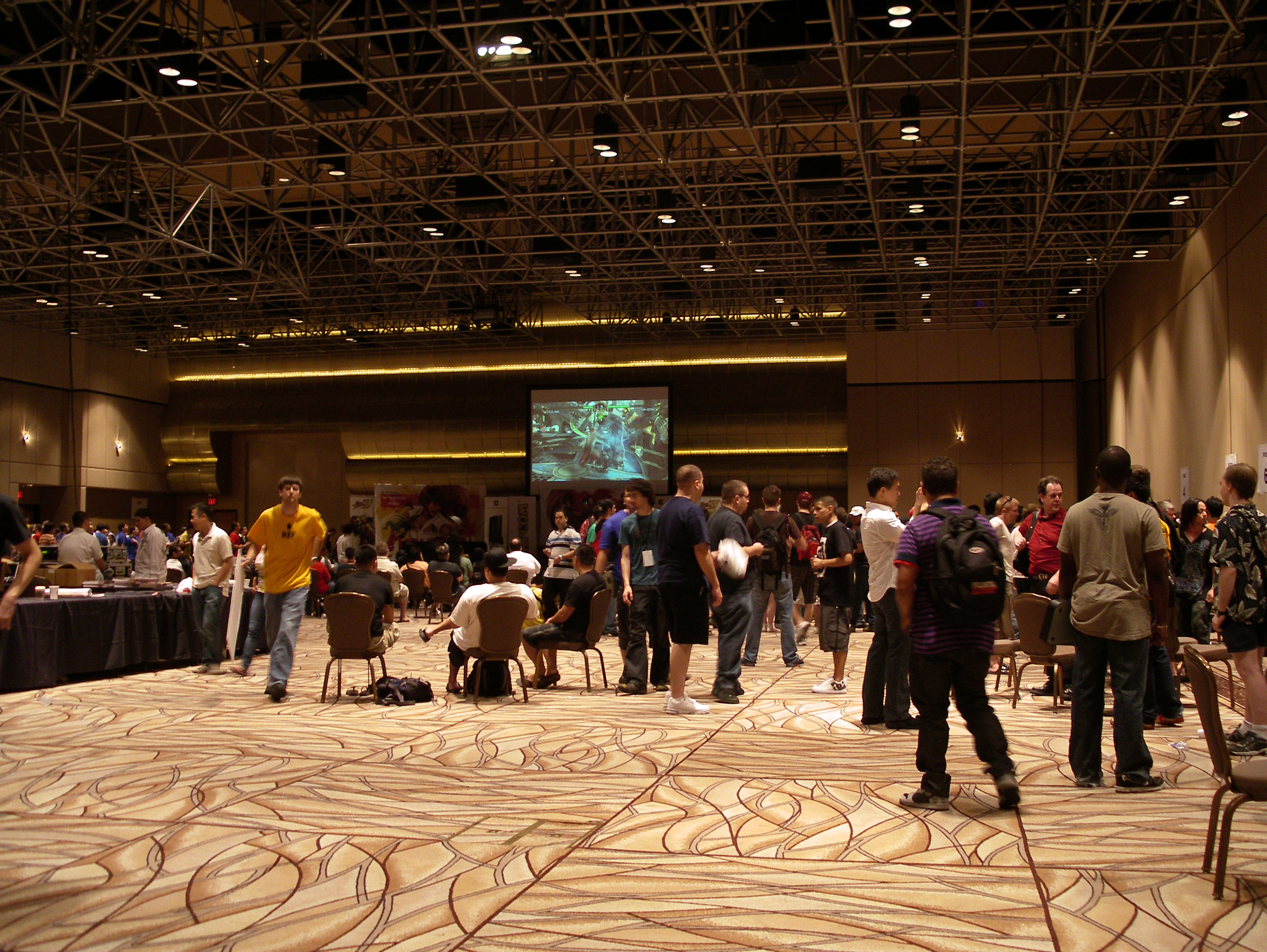
A crowd in the main hall on day 2 of Evo 2009

Evo 2009 took place on July 17 to 19. Held at the Rio Convention Center, in Las Vegas, Nevada, the tournament itself would feature six games on its official roster: Soulcalibur IV, Guilty Gear XX: Accent Core, Marvel vs. Capcom 2, Street Fighter III: 3rd Strike, Super Street Fighter II Turbo HD Remix and Street Fighter IV. Notably, the newly released Street Fighter IV increased Evo attendance by a considerable margin, and the tournament for it alone boasted more than 1000 participants, almost three times that of the tournaments for the other games.

Evo 2010, held at Caesars Palace from July 9, 2010 through July 11, 2010 had a massive number of competitors, with Super Street Fighter IV amassing approximately 1,800 players to duel for a $20,000 guaranteed prize pot. Most notable in this EVO was Justin Wong cementing his dominance in Marvel vs. Capcom 2 in its proverbial swan song, defeating the champion of the previous year, Sanford Kelly. Also notable was Wong failing to make the top 8 in Super Street Fighter IV, falling victim first to Vance "Vangief" Wu, and soon after to Taiwanese player Bruce "GamerBee" Hsiang. Melty Blood: Actress Again was included after a poll on Shoryuken.com to decide on the final game of the tournament, beating out Street Fighter III: 3rd Strike, Capcom vs. SNK 2, Marvel vs. Capcom 2, Soulcalibur IV, and The King of Fighters XII. BlazBlue: Calamity Trigger was to be included, but after a majority of the community moved on to BlazBlue: Continuum Shift, the decision was made to replace it with Marvel vs. Capcom 2. Also notable was G4's limited coverage of the event, even offering X-Play host Adam Sessler for commentary of the Super Street Fighter IV finals.

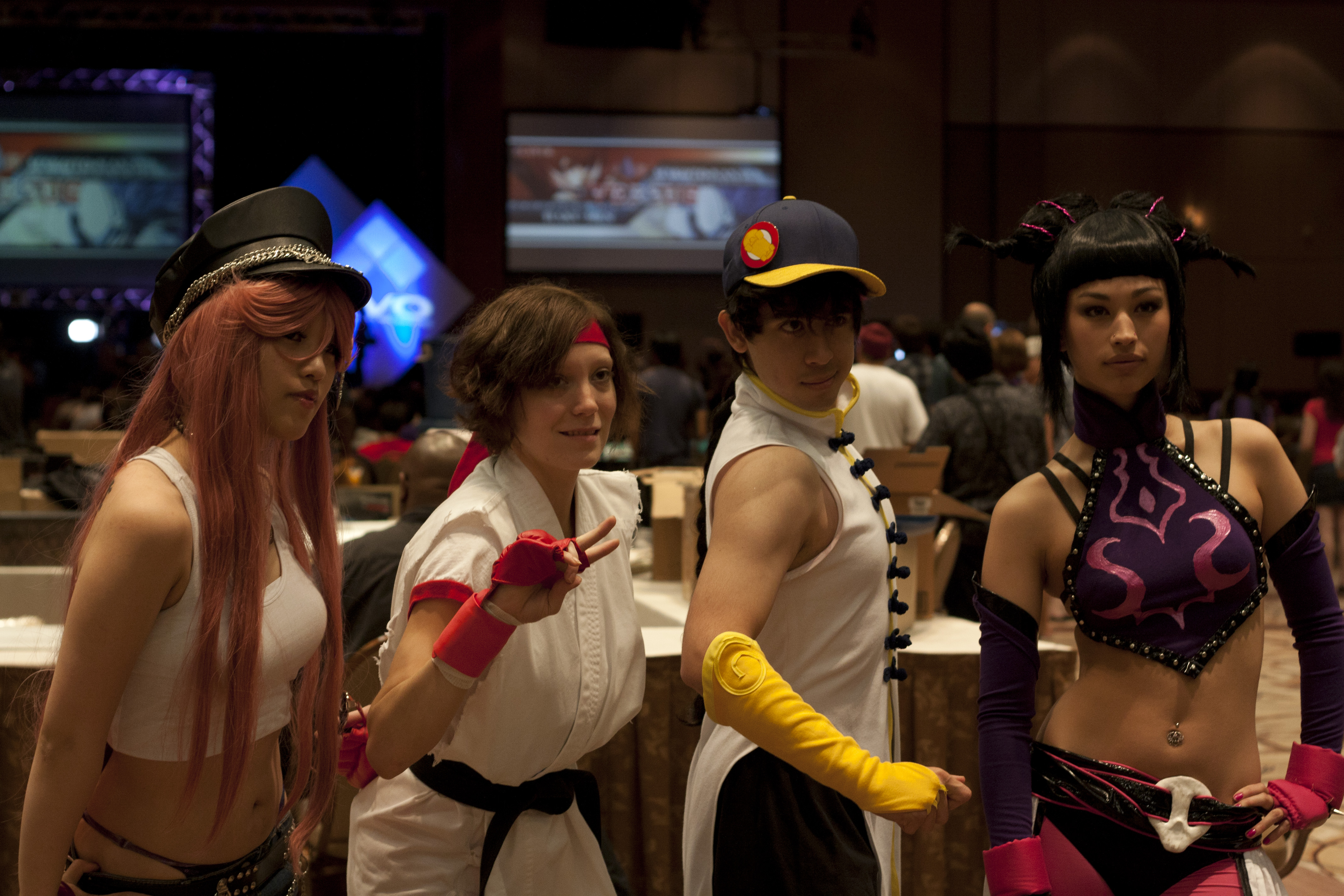
Street Fighter cosplayers at Evo 2011

For Evo 2011, a tournament season was announced in which players could earn ranking points at one of eight tournaments. It took place at the Rio All Suite Hotel and Casino from July 29 to 31, utilizing a 55,000-square-foot (5,100 m^{2}) ballroom. All 50 states of the U.S. were represented, as well as 44 additional countries. Its livestream was watched by over 2 million unique viewers on UStream over the course of the event.

In attendance was Street Fighter series producer Ono Yoshinori, who announced a free balance patch for Super Street Fighter IV Arcade Edition. Tekken series producer Katsuhiro Harada was also on hand to show new mechanics for Tekken Tag Tournament 2 and Soulcalibur V. Other unreleased games shown were Ultimate Marvel vs. Capcom 3, King of Fighters XIII, Skullgirls and Street Fighter III: 3rd Strike Online Edition. A Skullgirls side tournament was held in which the winner received a one-of-a-kind Skullgirls-themed arcade stick. Media outlets G4, GameSpot and Destructoid were all present to cover the event.

Evo 2012 took place July 6 to 8, 2012, at Caesars Palace, Las Vegas. On January 3, Joey Cuellar announced that Evo 2012 would have 6 main tournament games, Super Street Fighter IV: Arcade Edition (Version 2012), Ultimate Marvel vs. Capcom 3, Mortal Kombat, Soulcalibur V, The King of Fighters XIII and Street Fighter X Tekken. The tournament series from the previous year returned, featuring seeding points for all six games in 17 events all across the world.

Evo 2013 was announced on December 2, 2012. It was held on July 12–14 at Paris Las Vegas. On January 8, Joey Cuellar announced that EVO 2013 would have eight main tournament games, with the first seven revealed being Ultimate Marvel vs. Capcom 3, Super Street Fighter IV: Arcade Edition (Version 2012), Tekken Tag Tournament 2, Mortal Kombat, Street Fighter X Tekken (Version 2013), The King of Fighters XIII, and Persona 4 Arena. The eighth game was voted on by players via online donations, all proceeds of which went to the Breast Cancer Research Foundation. The eventual winner of the poll was Super Smash Bros. Melee with $94,683 raised for that game, while the total amount of donations was $225,744. Nintendo of America initially sent a cease and desist letter to cancel the streaming of Melee matches, although after popular backlash a live stream was ultimately allowed to be carried out as planned. On May 7, 2013, it was announced that Injustice: Gods Among Us would be a main tournament game, thus expanding the game roster from eight to nine.

=== 2014–19: Smash boom and international growth ===
Evo 2014 was announced on September 15, 2013. It was held on July 11–13, 2014 at the Westgate Las Vegas Resort & Casino On February 6, 2014, Cuellar announced that Evo 2014 would include BlazBlue: Chrono Phantasma, Ultimate Marvel vs. Capcom 3, Injustice: Gods Among Us, The King of Fighters XIII, Killer Instinct, and Ultra Street Fighter IV while also mentioning that discussions were ongoing with Nintendo on the possible inclusion of Super Smash Bros. Melee. Melee was eventually officially added to the roster with Nintendo's approval. Tekken Tag Tournament 2 was also later added to the roster.

Evo 2015 took place on July 17–19, 2015 at the Bally's / Paris Las Vegas Casino. On January 20, 2015, Cuellar announced that Evo 2015 would include Guilty Gear Xrd -SIGN-, Ultimate Marvel vs. Capcom 3, Super Smash Bros. for Wii U, Killer Instinct, Mortal Kombat X, Persona 4 Arena Ultimax, Ultra Street Fighter IV, Super Smash Bros. Melee, and Tekken 7.

While EVO 2015 initially was supposed to run on the PlayStation 4 version for Ultra Street Fighter IV, the tournament instead used the Xbox 360 version, due to a large number of bugs and glitches found by players in the newly released port. Cuellar also confirmed that EVO 2015 would use the technically outdated build of Persona 4 Arena Ultimax on PlayStation 3. On May 25, Cuellar confirmed that both Super Smash Bros. Melee and Super Smash Bros. for Wii U surpassed 1,500 entrants each. Cuellar later confirmed that Ultra Street Fighter IV surpassed 2,000 entrants. EVO 2015 also acted as a Capcom Cup qualifier for Ultra Street Fighter IV, as well as a Killer Instinct World Cup qualifier for Killer Instinct, with both games receiving respective bonus pots of $50,000 from Capcom/Sony and Iron Galaxy/Microsoft respectively. NetherRealm and Warner Bros. have also donated $50K towards the bonus pot for Mortal Kombat X, due to the success of the Blue Steel Sub-Zero skin. In addition, Atlus has donated $10K towards the bonus pot for Persona 4 Arena Ultimax, while Arc System Works and Aksys Games donated the same amount to the bonus pot for Guilty Gear Xrd. Bandai Namco has announced that they have provided a $30K bonus pot for Tekken 7 as well as providing all competitors in said game an exclusive T-shirt featuring franchise veteran Lili and Tekken Revolution newcomer Eliza.

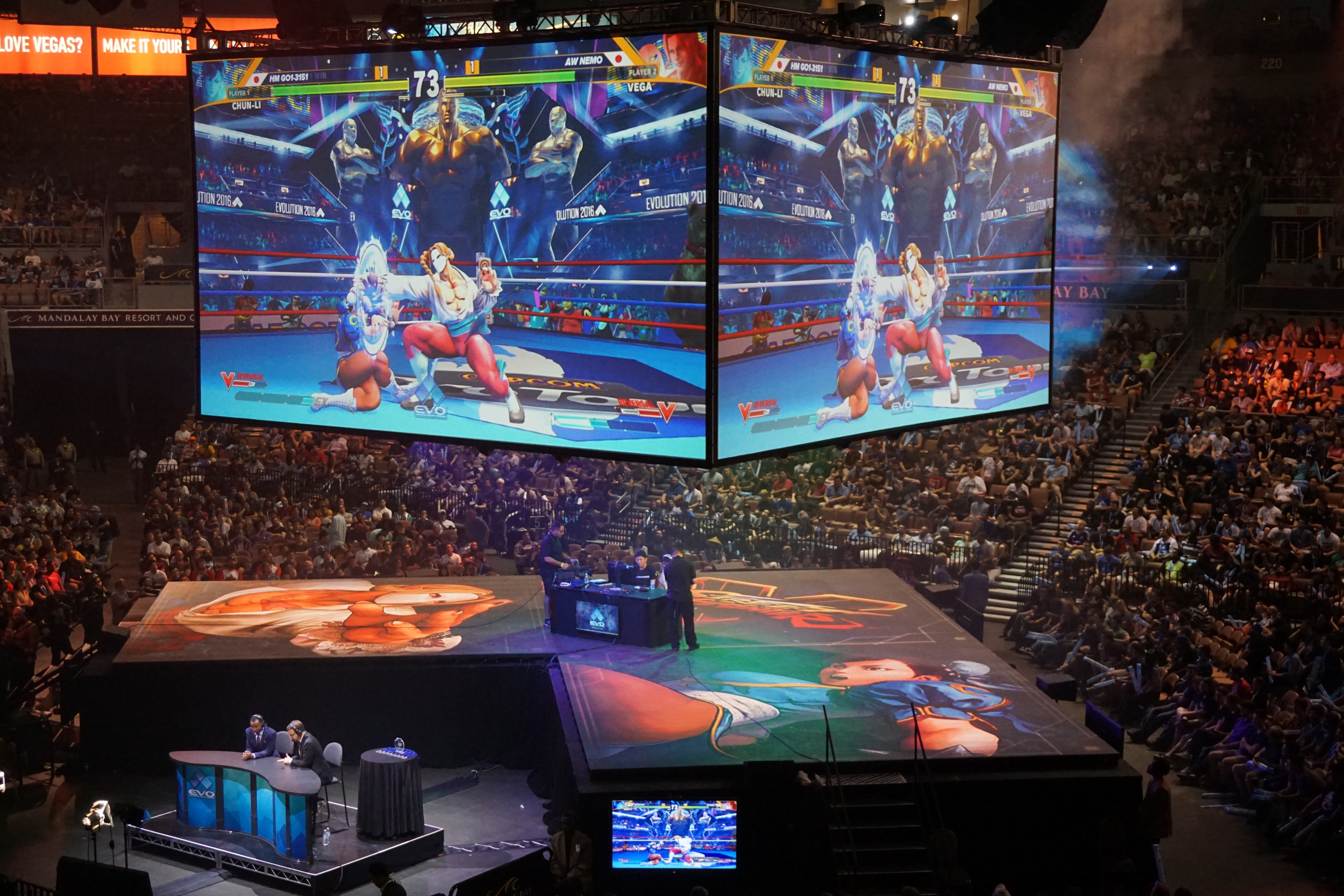
The Evo 2016 Street Fighter V finals in the Madalay Bay

Evo 2016 took place from July 15–17 at the Las Vegas Convention Center, while Sunday finals took take place at the Mandalay Bay Events Center. The tournament featured Guilty Gear Xrd -REVELATOR-, Street Fighter V, Super Smash Bros. Melee, Super Smash Bros. for Wii U, Mortal Kombat XL, Pokkén Tournament, Killer Instinct, Ultimate Marvel vs. Capcom 3, and Tekken 7: Fated Retribution. The tournaments for Street Fighter V, Super Smash Bros. Melee, Guilty Gear Xrd -REVELATOR-, Ultimate Marvel vs. Capcom 3, and Mortal Kombat XL finished on Sunday. The finals for Street Fighter V was broadcast live on ESPN2 and live coverage of the tournament was available through ESPN's WatchESPN service, in addition to the tournament's regular Twitch streams.

Joey Cuellar has announced record breaking numbers which includes Street Fighter V reaching more than 5,000 entrants, Smash 4 and Melee each reaching more than 2,000; Pokkén reaching more than 1,000 entrants while other games either increased or decreased. Like EVO 2015's Ultra Street Fighter IV finals, Capcom and Sony have provided a $50,000 bonus pot towards Street Fighter V's prize pool and is also a Capcom Pro Tour qualifier. The Pokémon Company has announced a $10,000 bonus pot towards Pokkén Tournament's prize pool and is a Pokkén Tournament Championship Series qualifier, with 1st and 2nd place being able to qualify for the finals. As with EVO 2015, NetherRealm and Warner Bros. have provided a $50,000 bonus pot towards Mortal Kombat XL's prize pool. Killer Instinct will be receiving a $15,000 bonus pot as part of the KI Ultra Tour funding. On July 11, Aksys Games announced a $10,000 bonus pot towards Guilty Gear Xrd -REVELATOR-'s prize pool.

Evo 2017 took place on July 14 to 16 with the entire event being held at the Mandalay Bay resort. The tournament featured Guilty Gear Xrd REV2, BlazBlue: Central Fiction, Super Smash Bros. for Wii U, Super Smash Bros. Melee, Injustice 2, Street Fighter V, Tekken 7, The King of Fighters XIV, and Ultimate Marvel vs. Capcom 3. The ninth game was chosen by a donation drive which all of the funds have gone towards Make-A-Wish International. Ultimate Marvel vs. Capcom 3 was the winning game with Pokkén Tournament being the runner-up. Other games in contention were Skullgirls: 2nd Encore, ARMS, Mortal Kombat XL, Nidhogg, Windjammers, Killer Instinct, and Super Street Fighter II Turbo. The Sunday finals included Ultimate Marvel vs. Capcom 3 (as the opening game), BlazBlue: Central Fiction, Tekken 7, Super Smash Bros. for Wii U, and Street Fighter V. Upon the victory of UMvC3, Cuellar announced that Evo 2017 would be running the event with the PlayStation 4 version being used.

Evo 2018 took place on August 3 to 5 with the entire event being held at the Mandalay Bay resort. The tournament featured Street Fighter V: Arcade Edition, Tekken 7, Super Smash Bros. for Wii U, Super Smash Bros. Melee, BlazBlue: Cross Tag Battle, Guilty Gear Xrd REV2, Injustice 2, and Dragon Ball FighterZ.

Evo 2019 took place on August 2 to 4 with the entire event being held at the Mandalay Bay resort. The tournament featured Street Fighter V: Arcade Edition, Tekken 7, Super Smash Bros. Ultimate, Mortal Kombat 11, Soulcalibur VI, Under Night In-Birth Exe:Late[st], Dragon Ball FighterZ, BlazBlue Cross Tag Battle, and Samurai Shodown.

=== 2020–present: COVID-19 cancellation and new ownership ===
Evo 2020 was to have taken place from July 31 to August 2 at the Mandalay Bay resort. However, due to the COVID-19 pandemic, the physical event had been canceled, with all event and hotel reservations to be refunded. Online tournament events had been scheduled from July 4 to August 2 as replacement activities. However, at the start of July 2020, charges of sexual misconduct were leveled at EVO CEO Joey Cuellar. The EVO board released Cuellar on July 2 and replaced him with Tony Cannon as interim CEO but by then, several publishers including Capcom, Bandai Namco, NetherRealm, and Mane6 had decided to pull out from the event. The EVO board decided to cancel the event, refund those tickets and donate the remaining funds to Project HOPE.

On March 18, 2021, it was announced that Evo had been acquired from original owner Triple Perfect by a joint venture between Sony Interactive Entertainment and RTS—a gaming-oriented talent agency backed by Endeavor and co-founded by streamer Pokimane. It was concurrently announced that Evo Online 2021 will be held August 6–8 and August 13–15, 2021, and feature Guilty Gear Strive, Mortal Kombat 11 Ultimate, Street Fighter V: Champion Edition, Tekken 7, and Skullgirls: 2nd Encore. Evo stated that the Sony ownership of the competition will not affect its ability to include events for non-PlayStation games, although all games in the 2021 lineup are either available on, or console-exclusive to, PlayStation.

Evo 2022 took place from August 5 to 7 at the Mandalay Bay resort. The event is the first since 2019 to take place in-person due to the COVID-19 pandemic. The tournament featured Dragon Ball FighterZ, Granblue Fantasy: Versus, Guilty Gear Strive, The King of Fighters XV, Melty Blood: Type Lumina, Mortal Kombat 11 Ultimate, Skullgirls: 2nd Encore, Street Fighter V: Champion Edition, and Tekken 7.

Evo 2023 was announced for August 4 to 6, with Street Fighter 6, Guilty Gear Strive, Dragon Ball FighterZ, The King of Fighters XV, Melty Blood: Type Lumina, Mortal Kombat 11 Ultimate and Tekken 7 all being featured. Ultimate Marvel vs. Capcom 3 was also announced as the eighth game of the lineup, serving to launch a new category dubbed a Throwback Tournament. Additionally, a pre-release tournament for Granblue Fantasy Versus: Rising was held, acting as the unofficial ninth lineup title. The event also underwent a format change, with finals switching from Top 8 to Top 6, seemingly due to runtime concerns. With 9,182 entrants, Evo 2023 was the largest Evo tournament in its over two decade history.

EVO 2024 took place from July 19 to 21 and was held in the Las Vegas Convention Center. The lineup included Street Fighter 6, Tekken 8, Mortal Kombat 1, Granblue Fantasy Versus: Rising, Under Night In-Birth II [Sys:Celes], Guilty Gear -Strive-, and The King of Fighters XV, with Street Fighter III: 3rd Strike being the year's Throwback Tournament in celebration of both the 25th anniversary of the game, as well as the 20th anniversary of Moment #37.

EVO 2025 was held from August 1 to August 3, with a lineup of Street Fighter 6, Tekken 8, Granblue Fantasy Versus: Rising, Guilty Gear -Strive-, Under Night In-Birth II [Sys:Celes], Fatal Fury: City of the Wolves, and Mortal Kombat 1, with Marvel vs. Capcom 2 being featured as the Throwback Tournament. Additionally, 2025 rebranded the Evo Community Showcase to the Evo Extended Lineup, a series of side tournaments officially organized and recognized by Evo despite not being featured in the main arena lineup. The Extended Lineup included Killer Instinct, Virtua Fighter 5 R.E.V.O., Rivals of Aether II, The King of Fighters XV, BlazBlue: Central Fiction, Guilty Gear Xrd REV2, Samurai Shodown and Capcom vs. SNK 2. The Top 8 format also returned.

In August 2025, Sony sold its ownership stake in Evo to the Indian events company Nodwin Gaming. Concurrently, the Qiddiya Investment Company —an investment firm owned by Saudi Arabia's Public Investment Fund—announced that it had made an investment in RTS. Quiddya Investment Company subsequently acquired RTS entirely in September 2025, and then acquired Nodwin's stake in February 2026, making it sole owner. RTS stated that Nodwin would continue to provide marketing services for the event.

Evo 2026 saw the Extended Lineup and Throwback Tournament being scrapped in place of the main lineup featuring twelve games, with the six highest-entered games being featured on the arena stage. The year's lineup included Street Fighter 6, Tekken 8, Fatal Fury: City of the Wolves, Under Night In-Birth II [Sys:Celes], Granblue Fantasy Versus: Rising, Rivals of Aether II, Invincible VS, Vampire Savior, Guilty Gear Strive, BlazBlue: Central Fiction, Virtua Fighter 5 R.E.V.O. World Stage, and 2XKO.

== Outside Vegas ==
In 2010, the Evolution Championship organizers announced its first overseas spin-off for the Evo series, titled "Evo Japan", which will be held in Japan. Its first tournament was originally planned to be held in the following year, initially titled "Evo vs Godsgarden", but was cancelled per the safety concerns after the Tōhoku earthquake and tsunami. Following Evo 2013, Cuellar noted that plans for the tournament to be held in Japan is still possible. Its first tournament finally held in 2017, titled Evo sài, first announced during the Evo 2016 event. Japanese media companies Aetas, Hearts United Group, and Shochiku Broadcasting worked together on investing a combined total of US$1 million into the event. During a presentation at the Tokyo Game Show in 2016, the Evolution organizers announced that the tournament is to be held in January 2018, while some form of "pre-tournament" took place in 2017.

At Evo 2017, the Evo Japan 2018 lineup was revealed to consist of Street Fighter V, Guilty Gear Xrd REV 2, Tekken 7, Super Smash Bros. for Wii U, BlazBlue: Central Fiction, The King of Fighters XIV, and ARMS; the event took place from January 26 to 28. The lineup is known to emphasize titles that are popular in Japan, as titles such as Super Smash Bros. Melee, Injustice 2, and Marvel vs. Capcom: Infinite are notably absent mostly due to their lack of popularity in the region.

Despite the 7,000 entrants, Evo Japan ended up reporting a $1.13m loss according to financial reports by Hearts United Group. However, its success had resulted in the 2019 edition being greenlit, which was held in February 2019.

In October 2019, Evo announced that the 2020 installment would feature Super Smash Bros. Ultimate as its headliner. The 2020 installment was the last completed Evo tournament prior to the suspension of the events due to the COVID-19 pandemic.

Following Evo 2022, the Evo Japan marked its return for the first time after a two year hiatus, due to be held in March 2023. Five months later, while Evo Japan 2024 tournament has been announced, scheduled to be held in April, Evo also announced its second overseas spin-off, which would later revealed to be held inside Palais des Expositions, in Nice, France, held in October 2025.

Also in July 2024, at the same time with Evo France's announcement, two tournaments were also announced. The first was the one-off special Evo Awards which would take place February 2025 in Los Angeles, and the second being the third overseas spin-off to be held in Singapore for the first time. In February 2026, Evo announced the dates for the first Evo Singapore tournament, scheduled on January 15-17, 2027, with the lineup revealed on September 17, 2026.

== Events ==
=== Battle by the Bay ===
Event	Dates	Venue	Location	Games
B3: Battle by the Bay	July 19-20, 1996	Golfland USA	Sunnyvale, California	Street Fighter Alpha 2; Super Street Fighter II Turbo
B4 Championships	July 15-16, 2000	Gameroom Folsom	Folsom, California	Marvel vs. Capcom 2; Street Fighter III: 3rd Strike; Street Fighter Alpha 2; Street Fighter Alpha 3; Super Street Fighter II Turbo
B5 Championships	August 3-5, 2001	Gameroom Folsom	Folsom, California	Capcom vs. SNK; Marvel vs. Capcom 2; Street Fighter Alpha 3; Super Street Fighter II Turbo

=== Evo ===
Event	Dates	Venue	Location	Games
Evo 2002	August 10-11, 2002	University of California, Los Angeles	Los Angeles, California	Capcom vs. SNK 2; Marvel vs. Capcom 2; Super Street Fighter II Turbo
Evo 2003	August 8-10, 2003	California State Polytechnic University, Pomona	Pomona, California	Capcom vs. SNK 2; Guilty Gear XX; Marvel vs. Capcom 2; Soulcalibur II; Street Fighter III: 3rd Strike; Super Street Fighter II Turbo; Tekken 4; Tekken Tag Tournament; Virtua Fighter 4: Evolution
Evo 2004	July 28-30, 2004	California State Polytechnic University, Pomona	Pomona, California	Capcom vs. SNK 2; Guilty Gear XX; Marvel vs. Capcom 2; Soulcalibur II; Street Fighter III: 3rd Strike; Super Street Fighter II Turbo; Tekken 4; Tekken Tag Tournament; Virtua Fighter 4: Evolution
Evo 2005	August 12-14, 2005	Green Valley Ranch Resort	Henderson, Nevada	Capcom vs. SNK 2; Guilty Gear X2 Reload; Marvel vs. Capcom 2; Street Fighter III: 3rd Strike; Super Street Fighter II Turbo; Tekken 5; Tekken Tag Tournament
Evo 2006 West	July 1-2, 2006	LAX Marriott	Los Angeles, California	Capcom vs. SNK 2; Dead or Alive 4; Guilty Gear XX Slash; Hyper Street Fighter II; Mario Kart DS; Marvel vs. Capcom 2; Street Fighter III: 3rd Strike; Tekken 5: Dark Resurrection
Evo 2006 East	July 15-16, 2006	Westin Stamford Hotel	Stamford, Connecticut	Capcom vs. SNK 2; Dead or Alive 4; Guilty Gear XX Slash; Hyper Street Fighter II; Mario Kart DS; Marvel vs. Capcom 2; Street Fighter III: 3rd Strike; Tekken 5: Dark Resurrection
Evo 2006 Finals	August 18-20, 2006	Red Rock Casino, Resort & Spa	Summerlin South, Nevada	Capcom vs. SNK 2; Dead or Alive 4; Guilty Gear XX Slash; Hyper Street Fighter II; Mario Kart DS; Marvel vs. Capcom 2; Street Fighter III: 3rd Strike; Tekken 5: Dark Resurrection
Evo 2007 East	May 24-27, 2007	Westin Stamford Hotel	Stamford, Connecticut	Capcom vs. SNK 2; Guilty Gear XX Accent Core; Marvel vs. Capcom 2; Street Fighter III: 3rd Strike; Super Smash Bros. Melee; Super Street Fighter II Turbo; Tekken 5: Dark Resurrection; Virtua Fighter 5
Evo 2007 West	July 26-29, 2007	San Diego Convention Center; Omni San Diego Hotel	San Diego, California	Capcom vs. SNK 2; Guilty Gear XX Accent Core; Marvel vs. Capcom 2; Street Fighter III: 3rd Strike; Super Smash Bros. Melee; Super Street Fighter II Turbo; Tekken 5: Dark Resurrection; Virtua Fighter 5
Evo 2007 Finals	August 24-26, 2007	Green Valley Ranch Resort	Henderson, Nevada	Capcom vs. SNK 2; Guilty Gear XX Accent Core; Marvel vs. Capcom 2; Street Fighter III: 3rd Strike; Super Smash Bros. Melee; Super Street Fighter II Turbo; Tekken 5: Dark Resurrection; Virtua Fighter 5
Evo 2008	August 8-10, 2008	Tropicana Las Vegas	Paradise, Nevada	Capcom vs. SNK 2; Marvel vs. Capcom 2; Street Fighter III: 3rd Strike; Super Smash Bros. Brawl; Super Street Fighter II Turbo; Tekken 5: Dark Resurrection
Evo 2009	July 17-19, 2009	Rio Convention Center	Paradise, Nevada	Guilty Gear XX: Accent Core; Marvel vs. Capcom 2; Soulcalibur IV; Street Fighter III: 3rd Strike; Street Fighter IV; Super Street Fighter II Turbo HD Remix
Evo 2010	July 9-11, 2010	Caesars Palace	Paradise, Nevada	Marvel vs. Capcom 2; Melty Blood: Actress Again; Super Street Fighter II Turbo HD Remix; Super Street Fighter IV; Tatsunoko vs. Capcom: Ultimate All-Stars; Tekken 6
Evo 2011	July 29-31, 2011	Rio Convention Center	Paradise, Nevada	BlazBlue Continuum Shift II; Marvel vs. Capcom 3; Mortal Kombat (2011); Super Street Fighter IV: Arcade Edition; Tekken 6
Evo 2012	July 29-31, 2012	Caesars Palace	Paradise, Nevada	The King of Fighters XIII; Mortal Kombat (2011); Soulcalibur V; Street Fighter X Tekken; Super Street Fighter IV: Arcade Edition; Ultimate Marvel vs. Capcom 3
Evo 2013	July 12-14, 2013	Bally's Las Vegas; Paris Las Vegas	Paradise, Nevada	Injustice: Gods Among Us; The King of Fighters XIII; Mortal Kombat (2011); Persona 4 Arena; Street Fighter X Tekken; Super Smash Bros. Melee; Super Street Fighter IV: Arcade Edition; Tekken Tag Tournament 2; Ultimate Marvel vs. Capcom 3
Evo 2014	July 11-13, 2014	Westgate Las Vegas Resort & Casino	Las Vegas, Nevada	BlazBlue: Chrono Phantasma; Injustice: Gods Among Us; Killer Instinct (2013); The King of Fighters XIII; Super Smash Bros. Melee; Tekken Tag Tournament 2; Ultimate Marvel vs. Capcom 3; Ultra Street Fighter IV
Evo 2015	July 17-19, 2015	Bally's Las Vegas; Paris Las Vegas	Paradise, Nevada	Guilty Gear Xrd; Killer Instinct; Mortal Kombat X; Persona 4 Arena Ultimax; Super Smash Bros. Melee; Super Smash Bros. for Wii U; Tekken 7; Ultimate Marvel vs. Capcom 3; Ultra Street Fighter IV
Evo 2016	July 15-17, 2016	Las Vegas Convention Center; Mandalay Bay Events Center	Las Vegas, Nevada; Paradise, Nevada	Guilty Gear Xrd Revelator; Killer Instinct (2013); Mortal Kombat XL; Pokkén Tournament; Street Fighter V; Super Smash Bros. Melee; Super Smash Bros. for Wii U; Tekken 7: Fated Retribution; Ultimate Marvel vs. Capcom 3
Evo 2017	July 14-16, 2017	Mandalay Bay Convention Center; Mandalay Bay Events Center	Paradise, Nevada	BlazBlue: Central Fiction; Guilty Gear Xrd REV 2; Injustice 2; The King of Fighters XIV; Street Fighter V; Super Smash Bros. Melee; Super Smash Bros. for Wii U; Tekken 7; Ultimate Marvel vs. Capcom 3
Evo 2018	August 3-5, 2018	Mandalay Bay Convention Center; Mandalay Bay Events Center	Paradise, Nevada	BlazBlue: Cross Tag Battle; Dragon Ball FighterZ; Guilty Gear Xrd REV 2; Injustice 2; Street Fighter V: Arcade Edition; Super Smash Bros. Melee; Super Smash Bros. for Wii U; Tekken 7
Evo 2019	August 2-4, 2019	Mandalay Bay Convention Center; Mandalay Bay Events Center	Paradise, Nevada	BlazBlue: Cross Tag Battle; Dragon Ball FighterZ; Mortal Kombat 11; Samurai Shodown (2019); Soulcalibur VI; Street Fighter V: Arcade Edition; Super Smash Bros. Ultimate; Tekken 7; Under Night In-Birth Exe:Late[st]
Evo Online	August 6-15, 2021	Virtual	Virtual	Guilty Gear Strive; Mortal Kombat 11 Ultimate; Skullgirls 2nd Encore; Street Fighter V: Champion Edition; Tekken 7
Evo 2022	August 5-7, 2022	Mandalay Bay Convention Center; Michelob Ultra Arena	Paradise, Nevada	Dragon Ball FighterZ; Granblue Fantasy Versus; Guilty Gear Strive; The King of Fighters XV; Melty Blood: Type Lumina; Mortal Kombat 11 Ultimate; Skullgirls 2nd Encore; Street Fighter V: Champion Edition; Tekken 7
Evo 2023	August 4-6, 2023	Mandalay Bay Convention Center; Michelob Ultra Arena	Paradise, Nevada	Dragon Ball FighterZ; Guilty Gear Strive; The King of Fighters XV; Melty Blood: Type Lumina; Mortal Kombat 11 Ultimate; Street Fighter 6; Tekken 7; Ultimate Marvel vs. Capcom 3
Evo 2024	July 19-21, 2024	Las Vegas Convention Center	Las Vegas, Nevada	Granblue Fantasy Versus: Rising; Guilty Gear Strive; The King of Fighters XV; Mortal Kombat 1; Street Fighter III: 3rd Strike; Street Fighter 6; Tekken 8; Under Night In-Birth II [Sys:Celes]
Evo 2025	August 1–3, 2025	Las Vegas Convention Center	Las Vegas, Nevada	Fatal Fury: City of the Wolves; Granblue Fantasy Versus: Rising; Guilty Gear Strive; Marvel vs. Capcom 2: New Age of Heroes (Marvel vs. Capcom Fighting Collection); Mortal Kombat 1: Khaos Reigns; Street Fighter 6; Tekken 8; Under Night In-Birth II [Sys:Celes]; BlazBlue: Central Fiction**; Capcom vs. SNK 2 (Capcom Fighting Collection 2)**; Guilty Gear Xrd REV2**; Killer Instinct**; The King of Fighters XV**; Rivals of Aether II**; Samurai Shodown**; Virtua Fighter 5 R.E.V.O.**; Beyblade X
Evo 2026	June 26-28, 2026	Las Vegas Convention Center	Las Vegas, Nevada	BlazBlue: Central Fiction; Fatal Fury: City of the Wolves; Granblue Fantasy Versus: Rising; Guilty Gear Strive; Invincible VS; Rivals of Aether II; Street Fighter 6; Tekken 8; Under Night In-Birth II [Sys:Celes]; Vampire Savior; Virtua Fighter 5 R.E.V.O. World Stage; 2XKO

^{**} denotes an Extended Lineup title.

=== Evo Japan ===
Event	Dates	Venue	Location	Games
Evo sài	May 20-21, 2017	Akiba Square	Tokyo, Japan	Guilty Gear Xrd REV 2; Super Smash Bros for Wii U; Tekken 7: Fated Retribution
Evo Japan 2018	January 26–28, 2018	Akiba Square; Sunshine City	Tokyo, Japan	ARMS; BlazBlue: Central Fiction; Guilty Gear Xrd REV 2; The King of Fighters XIV; Street Fighter V; Super Smash Bros. for Wii U; Tekken 7
Evo Japan 2019	February 15-17, 2019	Fukuoka Kokusai Center; Fukuoka International Congress Center	Fukuoka, Japan	BlazBlue: Cross Tag Battle; Guilty Gear Xrd REV 2; The King of Fighters XIV; Soulcalibur VI; Street Fighter V; Tekken 7
Evo Japan 2020	February 24-26, 2020	Makuhari Messe	Chiba, Japan	BlazBlue: Cross Tag Battle; Samurai Shodown; Soulcalibur VI; Street Fighter V; Super Smash Bros. Ultimate; Tekken 7
Evo Japan 2023	March 31-April 2, 2023	Tokyo Big Sight	Tokyo, Japan	Granblue Fantasy: Versus; Guilty Gear Strive; The King of Fighters XV; Melty Blood: Type Lumina; Street Fighter V: Champion Edition; Tekken 7; Virtua Fighter 5 Ultimate Showdown
Evo Japan 2024	April 27-29, 2024	Ariake GYM-EX	Tokyo, Japan	Granblue Fantasy Versus: Rising; Guilty Gear Strive; The King of Fighters XV; Street Fighter III: 3rd Strike; Street Fighter 6; Tekken 8; UNDER NIGHT IN-BIRTH II Sys:Celes
Evo Japan 2025	May 9-11, 2025	Tokyo Big Sight	Tokyo, Japan	Granblue Fantasy Versus: Rising; Guilty Gear Strive; The King of Fighters XV; Street Fighter III: 3rd Strike (Cooperation Cup Vol.19); Street Fighter 6; Tekken 8; Virtua Fighter 5 R.E.V.O. (19th Beat-Tribe Cup)
Evo Japan 2026	May 1-3, 2026	Tokyo Big Sight	Tokyo, Japan	Street Fighter 6; Tekken 8; Guilty Gear Strive; Granblue Fantasy Versus: Rising; The King of Fighters XV; Virtua Fighter 5 R.E.V.O. World Stage; Fatal Fury: City of the Wolves; Fist of the North Star; Vampire Savior; Melty Blood: Type Lumina; Under Night In-Birth II [Sys:Celes]; 2XKO

=== Evo Awards ===
Event	Dates	Venue	Location
Evo Awards 2025	February 15, 2025	Optimist Studios	Los Angeles, California

=== Evo France ===
Event	Dates	Venue	Location	Games
Evo France 2025	October 10-12, 2025	Palais des Expositions	Nice, France	Dragon Ball FighterZ; Fatal Fury: City of the Wolves; Granblue Fantasy Versus: Rising; Guilty Gear Strive; Hunter × Hunter: Nen × Impact; Street Fighter 6; Tekken 8
Evo France 2026	October 9-11, 2026	Palais des Expositions	Nice, France	2XKO; Avatar Legends: The Fighting Game; Fatal Fury: City of the Wolves; Granblue Fantasy Versus: Rising; Guilty Gear Strive; Marvel Tokon: Fighting Souls; Street Fighter 6; Tekken 8

=== Evo Singapore ===
Event	Dates	Venue	Location	Games
Evo Singapore 2027	January 15-17, 2027	Marina Bay Sands	Singapore	Granblue Fantasy Versus: Rising; Guilty Gear Strive; Marvel Tōkon: Fighting Souls; Street Fighter 6; Tekken 8 (Tekken World Tour 2026 Last Chance Qualifier+Finals)
