= French-Bread =

Japanese video game developer

Soft Circle French-Bread
- Native name: フランスパン
- Romanized name: Furansu Pan
- Formerly: Watanabe Seisakujo (1995–2003)
- Industry: Video games
- Founded: 1995; 31 years ago
- Founder: Nobuya Narita
- Headquarters: Taitō, Japan
- Key people: Nobuya Narita; (Studio Manager); Seichi Yoshihara; (Primary Sprite Artist); Kamone Serizawa; (Game Director); Masaru Kuba (Raito); (Sound and Music Composer); Takehiko Wagatsuma; (Special Effect, UI and Layout Artist)
- Products: Melty Blood series; Under Night In-Birth series
- Number of employees: 14 (2021)
- Website: www13.plala.or.jp/french/ (Old) unknown-corp.co.jp (New)

Soft Circle French-Bread, also known simply as French-Bread, is a Japanese video game developer founded in 1995 as Watanabe Production (渡辺製作所, Watanabe Seisakujo), based in Taitō, Tokyo, Japan. Originally a doujin circle, French-Bread became well known for their work in fighting games, particularly the Melty Blood series. In recent years, they worked on other licensed-based fighting games, such as Dengeki Bunko Fighting Climax and the company's original game, Under Night In-Birth. Most of its developed video games are commonly released for Microsoft Windows, Sega arcade systems, and PlayStation consoles.

== History ==
The Queen of Heart '98 cover art

The studio was named after a friend of Nobuya Narita, with whom he often played video games after school. They initially developed desk accessories for Windows. Narita discovered dojin Windows action games and fighting games such as the Tokimeki Taisen (ときめき大戦) and Moon Lights 2 that were ported from the X68000 home computer. He subsequently decided to develop his own project for Windows. It was initially conceived as an original work, but creating unique character designs and graphics proved difficult. Narita was later introduced to the visual novel To Heart and decided to develop his game as a derivative work. Characters for his project were sourced from To Heart, while the system mechanics were based on Asuka 120%, a game that served as an influence for Narita and his team. The Queen of Heart '98 was released on 30 December 1998 to positive critical reception from dojin gamers. The Queen of Heart series sold about 100,000 copies, and Watanabe Seisakujo became one of the most popular dōjin game developers. This surfaced significant copyright concern. Some hobbyists also uploaded M.U.G.E.N characters with data extracted from the game. Watanabe Seisakujo and Leaf received many inquiries about permission, although they had no relation to uploaders. Narita didn't hope a derivative work disturbed its original work and developer. He decided to stop creating unlicensed games, and start fresh with French-Bread (フランスパン, Furansu Pan). The circle name came from the dōjin circle to which Narita belonged to before Watanabe Seisakujo. As for the French Bread part in their name, this was due to being so broke at the time that they could only afford tap water and convenience store french bread to fill the staff's stomachs.

Since Melty Blood, French-Bread heavily uses a sprite drawing software known as EDGE2 to create character sprites for their future games.

Narita is also a close friend of Hiiragiboshi Takumi, the author of the Absolute Duo light novel series. They met over 15 years ago while both were still amateurs making doujins. Narita and the game developer's sprite artist Seichi Yoshihara has helped in designing battle suits for said novel series.

The founder of freelance video game developer group Subtle Style and the creator of Akatsuki EN-Eins series, Subtle becomes reoccurring freelance sprite artist for later modern French-Bread games since Under Night In-Birth and exchange to allow French Bread to include the titular Akatsuki Blitzkampf protagonist guest appearing in French Bread's said first original game series.

== Games developed ==
=== As Watanabe Seisakujo ===
Title	Year	Platform(s)	Notes
The Queen of Heart '98	1998	Microsoft Windows	Features characters from To Heart. Its game system was influenced by Asuka 120%.
The Queen of Heart '99	1999	Microsoft Windows	Features characters from Leaf games Features additional gameplay gimmicks from existing fighting games in the time period.
The Queen of Heart '99 Second Edition	2000	Microsoft Windows	
Ayu-chan Punch! (あゆちゃんパンチ!)	2000	Microsoft Windows	
Demon Hunter Mai (魔物ハンター舞 -少女の檻-)	2000	Microsoft Windows	Features characters from Kanon and is inspired by Capcom's Strider series.
The Queen of Heart '99 with Second Edition	2001	Microsoft Windows	
Party's Breaker: The Queen of Heart 2001	2001	Microsoft Windows	Features characters from Comic Party
-AIR- Flight (えあふり 観鈴ちん危機一髪)	2001	Microsoft Windows	Features characters from Air
Glove on Fight (GLOVE ON FIGHT ぐろ～ぶおんふぁいと)	2002	Microsoft Windows	Features characters from various dating sims, anime, and dōjin games.
Melty Blood	2002	Microsoft Windows	Features characters from the visual novel Tsukihime and is jointly produced with Type Moon prior to incorporating as a company.

=== As Soft Circle French-Bread ===
==== Arcade Games ====
Title	Year	Publisher(s)	Hardware	Notes
Melty Blood: Act Cadenza	2005	Ecole Software	Sega NAOMI	Updated to Version A in 2005, Version B in 2006, and Version B2 in 2007.
Melty Blood: Actress Again	2008	Ecole Software	Sega NAOMI	The first French Bread game to be featured at the international Evolution Championship Series tournament in 2010.
Melty Blood: Actress Again Current Code	2010	Ecole Software	Sega RingWide	Updated to Ver.1.05 and Ver.1.07 in 2011.
Under Night In-Birth	2012	Ecole Software	Sega RingEdge 2	Updated to EXE:Late in 2013.
Dengeki Bunko: Fighting Climax	2014	Sega and Dengeki Bunko	Sega RingEdge 2	
Under Night In-Birth Exe:Latest	2015	Arc System Works	Sega RingEdge 2	
Dengeki Bunko: Fighting Climax Ignition	2015	Sega and Dengeki Bunko	Sega RingEdge 2	
Under Night In-Birth Exe:Late cl-r	2021	Arc System Works	Sega ALLS HX	

==== Console & Computer Games ====
Title	Year	Platform(s)	Notes
Drill Milky Punch	2003	Microsoft Windows	Features characters from Âge games
Bike Banditz	2003	Microsoft Windows	Horizontally scrolling shooter, succeeding Wizards Star 2nd developed by the defunct dōjin circle NEXT.
Melty Blood Re-ACT	2004	Microsoft Windows	
Melty Blood Re-ACT Final Tuned	2005	Microsoft Windows	
Melty Blood: Act Cadenza	2006	PlayStation 2	
Melty Blood: Act Cadenza Ver. B	2007	Microsoft Windows	
Ragnarok Battle Offline	2004	Microsoft Windows	Published outside Japan by Gravity, this was one of French Bread’s earliest works released for the English-speaking market.
Glove on Fight 2: Gleam of Force (小鳩ヶ丘高校女子ぐろー部 Gleam of Force)	2008	Microsoft Windows	
Lilian Fourhand	2009	Microsoft Windows	Features characters from Maria-sama ga Miteru
Melty Blood: Actress Again Current Code	2011	Microsoft Windows	Published on Steam by Arc System Works in 2016. French Bread's first official foray into the English-speaking market.
Under Night In-Birth Exe:Late	2013	PlayStation 3 Microsoft Windows	Balancing update to Under Night In-Birth. Ported by Arc System Works. Updated to Exe:Late [st], then Exe:Late [cl-r]
Dengeki Bunko: Fighting Climax	2014	PlayStation 3 PlayStation Vita	
Under Night In-Birth Exe:Late [st]	2015	PlayStation 3 PlayStation 4 PlayStation Vita; Microsoft Windows	Balancing update to a console version of Under Night In-Birth Exe:Late. Ported by Arc System Works.
Dengeki Bunko: Fighting Climax Ignition	2015	PlayStation 3 PlayStation 4 PlayStation Vita	Balancing update to Dengeki Bunko Fighting Climax. The first game to release downloadable characters.
Under Night In-Birth Exe:Late [cl-r]	2020	PlayStation 4 Nintendo Switch; Microsoft Windows	Balancing update to Under Night In-Birth Exe:Late[st]. Previous owners of PlayStation 4 and Microsoft Windows versions of Exe:Late[st] upgraded to this version automatically, although this version's new content remains as paid downloadable content. Ported by Arc System Works.
Melty Blood: Type Lumina	2021	PlayStation 4 Nintendo Switch; Xbox One; Microsoft Windows	The first Melty Blood game depicts in remake timeline of Tsukihime series, and Melty Blood Act sub-series. Published by Aniplex subsidiary, Lasengle (formerly a game division of Delightworks in 2021).
Under Night In-Birth II [Sys:Celes]	2024	PlayStation 4 PlayStation 5 Nintendo Switch; Microsoft Windows	A sequel to Exe:Late sub-series. Published by Arc System Works.
Melty Blood: Twi-Lumina	2027	PlayStation 4 PlayStation 5 Xbox One; Nintendo Switch; Nintendo Switch 2 Microsoft Windows	A sequel to Melty Blood: Type Lumina set to release in 2027
