= Under Night In-Birth II =

2024 video game

Under Night In-Birth II [Sys:Celes]
- Developer: French-Bread
- Publishers: PlayStation 4, PlayStation 5, Nintendo Switch: JP: Arc System Works; NA: Bandai Namco Entertainment; AS: Capcom; EU: Clear River Games; Microsoft Windows: WW: Arc System Works; Arcade: JP: Arc System Works
- Directors: Nobuya Narita; Osamu Sugiyama; Kamone Serizawa
- Producers: Nobuya Narita; Osamu Sugiyama
- Designer: Seiichi Yoshihara
- Artist: Seiichi Yoshihara
- Composer: Raito
- Platforms: PlayStation 4; PlayStation 5; Microsoft Windows; Nintendo Switch; Arcade
- Release: PS4, PS5, Switch, Windows: WW: 21 January 2024; Arcade: JP: March 27, 2025
- Genres: Fighting, visual novel
- Modes: Single-player, multiplayer
- Arcade system: Sega ALLS

Under Night In-Birth II [Sys:Celes] (Note: Japanese: アンダーナイトインヴァースII) is a 2024 fighting game developed by French-Bread and published by Arc System Works. It is a sequel to Under Night In-Birth. It was released for PlayStation 4, PlayStation 5, Microsoft Windows, and Nintendo Switch on 21 January 2024. The arcade version was released for the Sega ALLS arcade board in 2025.

== Gameplay ==
Under Night In-Birth II is a 2D fighting game where two players compete against each other. The Grind Grid (GRD) system from the first game returns, located at the bottom centre of the screen. It is composed of six blocks per fighter, and fills whenever a fighter makes offensive moves. The player can activate the GRD Vorpal mode which adds bonus to the damage.

== Development and release ==
Under Night In-Birth II was developed by French-Bread, the creative studio behind the original Under Night In-Birth, as well as anime-inspired fighting games such as Dengeki Bunko: Fighting Climax and Melty Blood. The staff of the first game returned, including director Kamone Serizawa and graphic designer Seiichi Yoshihara.

On September 21, 2021, director Nobuya Narita and composer Raito confirmed on Twitter that the "next" installment of Under Night In-Birth was in development. Narita expressed interest in the announcement of said title coinciding with the tenth anniversary of the original release of the game. It was not explicitly stated whether this referred to a new version of Under Night In-Birth or a wholly new title set within the same universe. Eventually during Evolution Championship Series on August 4, 2023, the title was announced to be a sequel titled Under Night In-Birth II [Sys:Celes] and it was released on January 25, 2024. It serves as a final chapter of the Hollow Night storyline. It features DLC characters in season passes.

During Paris Games Week 2023, an open beta test for [Sys:Celes] was announced to take place from November 17 to 20, 2023 for PlayStation 4 and PlayStation 5. An early access release was made available for PlayStation owners in Japan, Hong Kong, England, and the United States on January 21, 2024.

After Stormy Night tournament on November 2, 2024, an arcade version for Sega's ALLS was announced. It is be powered by ALL.Net P-ras Multi version 3 and was released on March 27, 2025, in addition to the first two DLC characters will be available at launch, while the remaining DLC characters will be added post-launch at a same day as their DLC console releases. A new DLC fighter, Izumi, was announced at EVO 2025.

== Reception ==
Reception

Aggregate scores
Aggregator	Score
Metacritic	PC: 84/100; PS5: 80/100
OpenCritic	71%

Review scores
Publication	Score
Nintendo Life	9/10
Shacknews	9/10
Siliconera	9/10

Under Night In-Birth II received "generally favorable" reviews according to review aggregator website Metacritic. 71% of critics recommended the game according to OpenCritic.
