= Dengeki Gakuen RPG: Cross of Venus =

2009 video game

- Cover art
- Developer: Pegasus Japan
- Publisher: ASCII Media Works
- Platform: Nintendo DS
- Release: JP: March 19, 2009; Remake: JP: February 10, 2011
- Genre: Action role-playing
- Mode: Single-player

Dengeki Gakuen RPG: Cross of Venus (電撃学園RPG Cross of Venus) is a Japanese action role-playing video game developed by Pegasus Japan and published by ASCII Media Works for the Nintendo DS handheld video game console, and was first released in Japan on March 19, 2009, in limited and regular editions. An enhanced remake was released on the Nintendo DS in February 2011, titled Dengeki Gakuen RPG: Cross of Venus Special. The game was produced in commemoration of the fifteenth anniversary of ASCII Media Works' light novel imprint Dengeki Bunko. The player assumes the role of an unnamed protagonist attending Dengeki Academy who stumbles into a fight between heroines from Dengeki Bunko novel worlds and the evil organization Zetsumu. The reality-based world of Dengeki Academy and the novel worlds have become connected, and the player is able to help the Dengeki Bunko heroines fight the Zetsumu by going between the worlds. Eight heroines are presented, including Shana from Shakugan no Shana, Kino from Kino's Journey, and Kana Iriya from Iriya no Sora, UFO no Natsu. Each heroine fights with her own unique style of weapon, combos, and special attacks. The protagonist is designed by Kouhaku Kuroboshi, and his childhood friend Kizuna Kasugai is designed by Noizi Ito.

== Gameplay ==
In Dengeki Gakuen RPG, the story progresses through the player exploring Dengeki Academy and the novel worlds, and conversing with the characters in the game. When an enemy is encountered, the game switches over to the action RPG aspect of gameplay. During these times, the player can either choose to battle the enemy with the player character or switch during battle to one of the novel heroines. The player and each of the heroines have a life bar denoting how much health the character has, and an energy bar denoting the energy still usable for attacks. Each of the fighters use weapons specific to them, such as Shana from Shakugan no Shana using her katana, and Kino from Kino's Journey using her firearms. Combo attacks are possible to execute, and each character has his or her own unique combo and special attack. Enemies originally featured in the heroines' novels also make appearances. Of the eight heroines featured in the game, three—Index, Haruka Nogizaka, and Misao Minakami—are designated as helper characters. They can provide battle assistance via ability cards that can be used to attack enemies and heal the player's team, among other support. These cards have their origins in Dengeki Bunko novels, such as ability cards featuring helpful attacks and items from Spice and Wolf and Inukami!.

== Plot ==
=== Characters ===
The player assumes the role of an unnamed sixteen-year-old protagonist attending Dengeki Academy as a second-year high school student; the player is given the choice of any name for him. He does not often give deep thought before he acts, but is also a softhearted person. He is accompanied by his seventeen-year-old childhood friend and classmate Kizuna Kasugai (春日井 キズナ, Kasugai Kizuna; voiced by: Eri Kitamura) whom he met during kindergarten. In contrast to the protagonist, who does not read much, Kizuna is the library committee chairman and loves to read. She is described as a fan of Dengeki Bunko light novels, and a dream of hers is to read all the novels under that imprint, which exceeded 1800 volumes in July 2009. She takes the initiative in everything she does, and is the type to be responsible for keeping the peace. She is a caring person, but she is a little unyielding. Dengeki Gakuen RPG features eight main female characters from Dengeki Bunko light novel series, who include: Shana (voiced by: Rie Kugimiya) from Shakugan no Shana, Kino (voiced by: Ai Maeda) from Kino's Journey, Kana Iriya (voiced by: Ai Nonaka) from Iriya no Sora, UFO no Natsu, Index (voiced by: Yuka Iguchi) from Toaru Majutsu no Index, Taiga Aisaka (voiced by: Rie Kugimiya) from Toradora!, Dokuro (voiced by: Saeko Chiba) from Bludgeoning Angel Dokuro-Chan, Haruka Nogizaka (voiced by: Mamiko Noto) from Nogizaka Haruka no Himitsu, and Misao Minakami (voiced by: Haruka Tomatsu) from Asura Cryin'. There are also characters that can become available, such as Mikoto Misaka (voiced by: Rina Satō) from Toaru Majutsu no Index and Toaru Kagaku no Railgun.

=== Story ===
Dengeki Gakuen RPG is set primarily at Dengeki Academy, a Japanese private school that the main characters attend. The story revolves around an unnamed protagonist who one day hears a recent rumor that a ghost has been appearing during the night at school. While he does not have any real interest in the occult, he uses searching for the ghost as an excuse to sneak into the school campus one night. However, his childhood friend Kizuna Kasugai comes with him to search for the ghost, and the two decide to search around the bench in front of the campus store. In the silent darkness, the two gradually arrive at the door of the store, and before them, they see a person's shadow move in the room. By straining his eyes, the protagonist sees that the person casting the shadow is eating melon bread, and realizes that this must be the cause of the ghost rumor; the shadow is in fact cast by Shana from Shakugan no Shana. This is possible because one day the reality-based world of Dengeki Academy and the worlds of the Dengeki Bunko light novels suddenly become connected, allowing people from both the real-world and the novel worlds to cross over.

By meeting Shana, the protagonist and Kizuna become entangled in a struggle by the members of the novel worlds to protect their worlds from the unidentified evil organization known as Zetsumu (絶夢), who have been changing story details from the novel worlds and creating disorder in them. Their goal is "to snatch away the smiles from every person". In order to combat Zetsumu, the protagonists will help the fighters from the novel worlds by traveling between the real-world and the novel worlds.

== Development ==
Dengeki Gakuen RPG: Cross of Venus was developed by Pegasus Japan, and published by ASCII Media Works. The CG artwork featured in the game was done by a team of graphic artists from Akabeisoft2. The music in the game is composed by Yūji Toriyama. The game's opening theme song, "Odyssey" (オデッセイ, Odessei), is sung by Yuuka Nanri and the lyrics are written by Yūho Iwasato. The game was first released in Japan on March 19, 2009, in limited and regular editions. The limited edition was sold at nearly twice the price of the regular edition, and included with the game a set of four small super deformed figurines of Taiga, Shana, Kino, and Index. A book of short stories written by Dengeki Bunko authors entitled Dengeki Gakuen RPG Bunko (電撃学園RPG文庫) was given as a special favor for reserving either game edition; each story is set at Dengeki Academy.

An enhanced remake was released on the Nintendo DS on February 10, 2011, titled Dengeki Gakuen RPG: Cross of Venus Special (電撃学園RPG Cross of Venus SPECIAL) developed by the same team. This version features a whole new map layout, upgraded to 3D graphics instead of the previous 2D graphics. Other additions include: new dialogue and party conversation, three new sub-scenarios, gameplay balancing, and a boss rematch mode.

== Related media ==
The single for "Odyssey" was released on February 25, 2009. The game's original soundtrack was released on March 25, 2009. A drama CD entitled Dengeki Gakuen RPG: Kizuna no Bōken (電撃学園RPG キズナの冒険) was released on March 28, 2009. The CD also contains two vocal songs sung by Eri Kitamura, the drama CD's theme song "Believe", and the game's insert song "Planetary". The game's official fan book was released on March 19, 2009, published by ASCII Media Works.

The Zetsmu Organization reappears as the antagonist of a later Dengeki crossover title, Dengeki Bunko: Fighting Climax.

== See also ==
- Dengeki Bunko: Fighting Climax
