= Ragnarok Battle Offline =

- Developer: French-Bread
- Publishers: French-Bread; Gravity
- Artist: Namikai Harukaze
- Composer: Masaru Kuba (Raito)
- Series: Ragnarok series
- Platform: Microsoft Windows
- Release: 2004
- Genre: Beat 'em up
- Modes: Single-player, multiplayer

Ragnarok Battle Offline is a beat 'em up game for Microsoft Windows created by dojin soft developer French-Bread. The soundtrack is composed by Raito of Lisa-Rec. It is a homage and a spoof of the massively multiplayer online role-playing game Ragnarok Online created by South Korean developer Gravity Corporation.

The game's high sales led Gravity Corporation to give it a release outside of Japan. Released as Ragnarok Battle, the game has been distributed in Indonesia, Taiwan, Thailand and a deluxe package in Korea which comes with its own gamepad. Level Up! Games also released an English version of Ragnarok Battle Offline available in the Philippines, but this release is based only on the initial version of Ragnarok Battle Offline, which does not include the expansions released by French-Bread.

Since April 2007, the game has been digitally distributed through Melonbooks DL.

== Gameplay ==
Though primarily a beat 'em up game, Ragnarok Battle Offline also contains some role-playing elements. The player creates a character from one of six basic classes and one unlockable class, allocate points to the character's stats and skills, and enter one of the stages. Up to three people can play at once, using the keyboard, joysticks or gamepads.
