= BlazBlue: Cross Tag Battle =

2018 video game

- Limited edition boxart, featuring (clockwise from top) Ruby, Yu, Ragna and Hyde
- Developer: Arc System Works
- Publishers: WW: Arc System Works; EU: PQube (NS, PS4)
- Producer: Toshimichi Mori
- Artist: Konomi Higuchi
- Series: BlazBlue: Persona; Under Night In-Birth; RWBY; Arcana Heart; Senran Kagura; Akatsuki Blitzkampf
- Platforms: Nintendo Switch; PlayStation 4; Windows; Arcade; Xbox One; Xbox Series X/S
- Release: NS, PS4, Windows: JP: May 31, 2018; NA: June 5, 2018; EU: June 22, 2018; Arcade: JP: April 25, 2019; Amazon Luna: US: February 18, 2021; Xbox One, Series X/S: WW: April 26, 2023
- Genre: Fighting
- Modes: Single-player, multiplayer
- Arcade system: Taito Type X3; Sega ALLS UX

BlazBlue: Cross Tag Battle (Note: BureiBurū Kurosu Taggu Batoru (Japanese: ブレイブルー クロスタッグバトル) in Japanese) is a 2D crossover fighting game developed and published by Arc System Works, first released for PlayStation 4, Nintendo Switch, and Windows in 2018.

Cross Tag Battle features characters from different series, including BlazBlue, Persona 4 Arena, Under Night In-Birth, and RWBY. After the game was released, characters from Arcana Heart, Senran Kagura, and Akatsuki Blitzkampf were added as downloadable content. An arcade port was released in 2019 in Japan, a version for Amazon Luna was made available in 2021, and the Special Edition with all post-launch content was released for Xbox One and Xbox Series X/S in 2023.

The game received mostly positive reviews, with praise for the visuals, music, online functionality and mechanics. However, it was criticised for lack of overall content at launch and DLC practices.

== Gameplay ==
Cross Tag Battle is a fighting game with tag team mechanics. In its main modes, players battle in 2-vs-2 matches: they control one of the two selected characters at a time, and are able to switch between them on command. In addition to the standard fighting game meter that is expended to perform special and EX moves, the game features another resource: the assist meter. If they have enough, players can also have the second character use assist attacks to extend combos, keep the opponent away, or alternatively use all meter on "Cross Burst" to escape from dangerous situations. Similar to Marvel vs. Capcom, even if one character on the team loses all of their health, the match continues until both are down.

To accommodate for the tag mechanics and make characters easier to learn, the controls were simplified compared to mainline BlazBlue games and other participating series. In addition, each character was given some universal options, such as an overhead with the heavy button, invincible reversal attack, and auto combos. Some series-specific mechanics were retained, but heavily reworked to fit the game. Examples include the Persona system for the Persona cast, Reverse Beat for the Under Night In-Birth cast, or Reflector for the Akatsuki Blitzkampf cast.

== Plot ==
A singularity called the "Phantom Field" mixes reality with other universes. When the "Keystone" divides into four fragments, the female voice system known as "System XX" instructs one of the main characters to keep it away from others and reach the goal, gathering all characters to join the battle, who hope to separately return home to each universe. After all fragments merged into one, they prevent the system from changing the universe.

However, the next episode of the storyline ends, when Hazama possesses the primary keystone containing the system itself, and attempts to use it to hijack the Takemagahara System. Takemagahara detects the remnants of Yūki Terumi within him, and copies his genes to create the clone of Susano’o as a countermeasure, but indirectly leads to the destruction of multiverse. While System XX holds off the clone from being unleashed, a regretful Hazama took over the role as the multiversal tournament's conductor at the former's behest. As System XX cannot hold off the Susano’o clone much longer, Hazama changes the contest that was solely Tag Battle-themed keystone hunting into multiple-themed stamp collecting, in addition to bring characters in from three more universes, hoping for the winners to assist him and System to defeat the clone. Despite the fact that the Susano’o clone was defeated by Ragna the Bloodedge and Naoto Kurogane, System XX cannot return the characters to their respective universes, due to being critically weakened from holding off the clone. The storyline ends with the characters participating in the endless Tag Team-based Battle Royale and waiting for System XX's full recovery.

=== Characters ===
The game released with twenty characters playable in the base game. A further twenty were then available as "Season 1" DLC. On June 7, 2018, Minoru Kidooka confirmed that "Season 2" DLC would be added for arcade edition in April 2019 and for the console version in May 2019. Blake Belladonna and Yang Xiao Long were also altered to be free downloadable content, while other characters are available at a cost. Naoto Kurogane, Teddie, Seth, and the titular Arcana Heart protagonist Heart Aino, were included with the release of the Japanese arcade version, and as paid content with version 1.5 update of the PC and console versions. Version 2.0 introduced battle changes, new story content, and the inclusion of the characters: Celica A. Mercury, Susano'o, Elizabeth, Tohru Adachi, Hilda, and Neopolitan. Characters from Senran Kagura and Akatsuki Blitzkampf were also added as sixth and seventh series, with Yumi, Akatsuki, and Blitztank. There are 53 playable characters in total as of Version 2.0.

RWBY notably stands-out as the only series included which is not of video game origin, let alone that of a fighting/hack-and-slash video game. RWBY did receive a hack-and-slash video game in the form of RWBY: Grimm Eclipse prior to Cross Tag Battle's release, but RWBY content is included in Cross Tag Battle under the labelling of the whole franchise. This is contrary to the inclusion of Persona 4 Arena, which is always referred to with that specific title (rather than broadly "Persona" or "Persona 4") within the context of Cross Tag Battle. The character Aegis notably keeps the Japanese spelling of her name in the English version, despite the character being called "Aigis" in all official English releases of Persona content outside of Cross Tag Battle.

	BlazBlue		Persona 4 Arena	Under Night In-Birth	RWBY	Arcana Heart	Senran Kagura	Akatsuki Blitzkampf
Base game	Ragna; Jin; Noel; Rachel; Tager	Nu-13; Hazama; Makoto; Azrael; Es	Yu; Yosuke; Chie; Yukiko	Hyde; Linne; Waldstein; Gordeau	Ruby; Weiss			
S1 DLC	Hakumen; Platinum; Izayoi	Nine; Mai; Jubei	Kanji; Naoto S.; Mitsuru; Akihiko; Aegis; Labrys	Carmine; Orie; Merkava; Vatista; Yuzuriha; Mika	Blake‡; Yang‡			
S2 DLC	Celica; Naoto K.	Susano'o	Teddie; Elizabeth; Adachi	Seth; Hilda	Neo	Heart	Yumi	Akatsuki; Blitztank

Notes:
‡ Free downloadable content character

== Development ==
In a 2016 interview with Forbes, producer Toshimichi Mori revealed his interest in RWBY, in particular each character's signature colour and personal theme. Before the game was released, Rooster Teeth teased the possibility of a RWBY fighting game being revealed at Evo 2017 on their Twitter account. The game was announced at the Evo 2017 championships on July 16, 2017, following Ryusei Ito's victory in BlazBlue: Central Fiction. Ragna the Bloodedge, Jin Kisaragi, Yu Narukami, Hyde Kido, and Ruby Rose appeared in the game's announcement trailer. Konomi Higuchi served as a character designer. According to Mori, Cross Tag Battle was designed for home consoles, although an arcade version was later announced. The arcade port features support for USB controllers, and is cross-compatible with both Sega's ALL.Net and Taito's NESiCAxLive services.

In an interview with Famitsu, Mori stated that the game was developed with overseas audiences in mind. Cross Tag Battle is the first BlazBlue game since Chrono Phantasma to be dubbed into English, with an option to toggle between English and Japanese voices on each character. Arc System Works published the game in most territories, while PQube released the console versions in Europe.

Pre-release, Arc System Works announced that there would be twenty paid downloadable content characters for the first season of the game, resulting in Cross Tag Battle launching with only half of its planned roster at twenty. This caused backlash from fans, with the arguments that the game reused assets from the past fighting games, and that half of Team RWBY would be sold separately. In response, Mori announced that Blake and Yang would be released free of charge. In addition, he stated that costs for the characters would not exceed that of the game's base retail cost. Post-release, Arc System Works revealed a teaser trailer for a fifth franchise to be included as part of Season 2, later revealed to be Arcana Heart at EVO Japan 2019. The sixth and seventh franchises, Senran Kagura and Akatsuki Blitzkampf, were revealed at EVO 2019.

At CEO 2021, it was revealed that the PlayStation 4 and Steam versions of the game were patched with rollback netcode in 2022. A version for Amazon Luna was released on February 18, 2021. At Tokyo Game Show 2022, it was announced that the Special Edition of the game, containing all post-release downloadable content, would launch for Xbox One and Xbox Series X/S in Q2 2023. This final version of the game released on April 26, 2023.

== Reception ==
Reception

Aggregate score
Aggregator	Score
Metacritic	NS: 79/100; PS4: 76/100

Review scores
Publication	Score
Destructoid	8/10
Famitsu	35/40
GamesMaster	88%
GameSpot	9/10
IGN	8.3/10
PlayStation Official Magazine – UK	6/10

The game received mostly positive reviews, with praise for visuals, music, online functionality, and game mechanics, but criticism was given to a lack of overall content at launch and its downloadable content (DLC) practices. Famitsu awarded it a score of 35/40.

=== Sales ===
The game sold 11,696 copies for PlayStation 4 and 4,271 copies on Nintendo Switch in Japan. It had sold over 450,000 copies worldwide in June 2020.

=== Accolades ===
The game was nominated for "Best Fighting Game" at The Game Awards 2018, for "Fan Favorite Fighting Game" at the Gamers' Choice Awards, for "Best Fighting Game" at the Titanium Awards, for the Raging Bull Award for Best Fighting Game at the New York Game Awards, and for "Fighting Game of the Year" at the 22nd Annual D.I.C.E. Awards.
