= Under Night In-Birth =

2012 video game

- Genres: Fighting, visual novel
- Developers: French-Bread; Ecole Software
- Publishers: JP: Sega (original and Exe:Late), Arc System Works (consoles and post-Exe:Late); NA: Aksys Games (Exe:Late sub-series); EU: NIS America (Exe:Late), PQube (Exe:Late[st/cl-r]), Clear River Games (Sys:Celes); WW: Arc System Works (Exe:Late sub-series [Microsoft Windows], Sys:Celes)
- Creators: Nobuya Narita; Toshimichi Mori (UNIEL[ST/CL-R]); Osamu Sugiyama (UNI2SC); Seiichi Yoshihara; Raito
- Platforms: Arcade (Sega RingEdge 2, Sega ALLS HX); PlayStation 3; Microsoft Windows; PlayStation 4; PlayStation Vita; Nintendo Switch; Amazon Luna; PlayStation 5
- First release: Under Night In-Birth; September 20, 2012
- Latest release: Under Night In-Birth II [Sys:Celes] January 25, 2024

Under Night In-Birth (Note: Japanese: アンダーナイトインヴァース, Hepburn: Andā naito invāsu) is a fighting game developed by French-Bread and Ecole Software. Initially published in arcades by Sega in 2012, Arc System Works assumed publishing duties after the game's first home console release in 2014.

A sequel, Under Night In-Birth II, was released in 2024.

== Versions ==
Under Night In-Birth (Exe:Late ([st/cl-r]))
- Developers: French-Bread; Ecole Software
- Publishers: JP: Sega (original and Exe:Late), Arc System Works (consoles and post-Exe:Late); NA: Aksys Games; EU: NIS America (Exe:Late), PQube; WW: Arc System Works (Microsoft Windows)
- Director: Nobuya Narita
- Producers: Nobuya Narita; Toshimichi Mori
- Artist: Seiichi Yoshihara
- Composer: Raito
- Platforms: Arcade; PlayStation 3; Microsoft Windows; PlayStation 4; PlayStation Vita; Nintendo Switch; Amazon Luna
- Release: September 20, 2012: Arcade; JP: September 20, 2012 Exe:Late Arcade; JP: September 9, 2013 PlayStation 3; JP: July 24, 2014; NA: February 24, 2015; EU: February 27, 2015 Microsoft Windows; WW: July 12, 2016 Exe:Late[st] Arcade; JP: July 23, 2015 PS3, PS4, PS Vita; JP: July 20, 2017; NA: February 9, 2018; EU: February 9, 2018 Microsoft Windows; WW: August 20, 2018 Exe:Late[cl-r] PS4, Nintendo Switch; JP: February 20, 2020; NA: February 20, 2020; EU: February 21, 2020 Microsoft Windows; WW: March 27, 2020 Amazon Luna; US: January 21, 2021 Arcade; JP: April 15, 2021
- Genres: Fighting, visual novel
- Modes: Single-player, multiplayer
- Arcade system: Sega RingEdge 2 Sega ALLS HX (Exe:Late[clr])

The first entry in the series, Under Night In-Birth, was released exclusively as an arcade game using Sega's RingEdge 2 arcade board on September 20, 2012 by Sega in Japan. In March 2013, support for Sega's ALL.Net P-Ras Multi service was added. A major revision, subsequently entitled Under Night In-Birth Exe:Late (アンダーナイトインヴァースエクセレイト, Andā naito invāsu ekusereito), was released on September 9, 2013. This updated version of the game would receive a port published by Arc System Works for PlayStation 3 in Japan on July 24, 2014. A 2015 release for North America and Europe was later announced, with the North American version published by Aksys Games on February 24, 2015 and the European version released by NIS America on February 27, 2015. Exe:Late was released on Steam for Microsoft Windows systems on July 12, 2016.

A further update to the game entitled Under Night In-Birth Exe:Late[st] was announced on May 15, 2015. Under Night In-Birth Exe:Late[st] was released on PlayStation 3, PlayStation 4, and PlayStation Vita in Japan on July 20, 2017, and in North America and Europe on February 9, 2018. Arc System Works later published this version on Steam for Microsoft Windows systems on August 20, 2018.

A final revision of the game, entitled Under Night In-Birth Exe:Late[cl-r], was announced on August 3, 2019 at Evolution Championship Series. It was released for the PlayStation 4 and Nintendo Switch on February 20, 2020 in Japan and North America and February 21, 2020 in Europe. A version for Steam for Microsoft Windows was released on March 27, 2020, superseding the Exe:Late[st] release from 2018. The PlayStation 4 and Steam versions of Exe:Late[st] received updates to match the contents of this revision, while those who purchased the PlayStation 3 version were eligible to upgrade to the latest version via a limited-time discount, which ran until April 30, 2020 in Japan and North America, and April 31, 2020 in Europe. New content exclusive to Exe:Late[cl-r], such as a new playable character and additional character palettes, could be added to Exe:Late[st] through the purchase of paid downloadable content. The game was released for Amazon Luna on January 21, 2021. An arcade port of Exe:Late[cl-r] using Sega's ALL.Net P-Ras Multi service was released on April 15, 2021.

== Gameplay ==
Under Night In-Birth is a 2D fighting game with similar mechanics to Melty Blood, Guilty Gear, and BlazBlue. Characters have weak, medium, and strong attack buttons, along with a fourth one tied to the game's Grind system. Attacks can cancel into each other in any order, and they can cancel into special and super attacks.

The Grid system, abbreviated to GRD in the game, is a tug-of-war mechanic between players that rewards them for certain defensive or offensive actions. This is visually represented by an on-screen gauge called the Grind Grid, which shows the influence each player has during a match. Playing aggressively and utilizing system mechanics well increases a player's influence over the Grind Grid, while actions such as taking damage and retreating lowers their influence. At set intervals of time, the game evaluates which player has the most influence over the Grind Grid and rewards the player with various advantages, such as a temporary damage increase and the ability to cancel any attack at the cost of resources. When utilized poorly, such as failing to guard against an attack with the appropriate defensive shield, a player can temporarily be locked out of functions related to the Grind system and placed at a disadvantage.

A traditional super meter known as the EXS Gauge fills up whenever players attack or get hit. Characters can expend resources from the gauge for various functions, such as enhancing special attacks, performing super attacks known as Infinite Worths, or changing momentum from a defensive position. At low health, characters can also use a unique super attack called an Infinite Worth EXS, which are highly damaging and often feature a cinematic element when performed successfully.

Each later release after the original adds new features:

- Exe:Late adds Guard Thrust, a defensive option, and Force Functions, a unique character specific action that costs GRD to use.
- Exe:Late[st/cl-r] adds Cross-Cast Veil Off, a combo-based burst where characters with at least half a bar of super meter and Vorpal state can cancel combos into a Veil Off burst; and a prequel-based visual novel series Chronicle Mode.
- II [Sys:Celes] adds not only custom coloring and rollback netcode which first appeared in Melty Blood: Type Lumina, but also a Celestial variant of GRD Vorpal when players' GRD is at level six or beyond, and a dodge roll-based Creeping Edge. Additionally, it also includes an exclusive special attack function that can only be cancelled from normal attacks, either as fourth option of improved Smart Steer or A+B, akin to the first two options of Rapid Beat, and Moon Skill from Type Lumina.

== Plot ==
Every month, since feudal times, a phenomenon called the Hollow Night brings forth invisible creatures called Voids. They feed upon a power known as EXS, a latent resource within every human, and they harvest EXS from those who are unfortunate to wander into the Hollow Night. Many of these attacks end in death, insanity, or a human being transformed into a Void and the city of Kanzakai has been facing an ever increasing amount of cases of missing people due to these frequent attacks. Those who survive these encounters become beings known as In-Births, gaining the ability to manipulate their bodies' natural EXS.

After surviving a Void attack, high school student Hyde Kido develops his own power after narrowly escaping with his life thanks to the assistance of his impromptu savior, a mysterious girl named Linne. She explains that on-top of being an In-Birth, she has been alive for the past 500 years and has been seeking a way to end her life permanently, with Kanzakai being her most recent stop on her journey. She explains that Hyde's newly developed ability holds promise in being the one to finally end her cursed existence and she has him make a promise to end her life when the time is right. Before that however, Linne has her sights set on stopping a group of In-Births in town known as Amnesia, led by a woman called Paradox, from ascending to become a Re-Birth, a powerful existence that surpasses ordinary In-Births.

Other groups of In-Births out in the Hollow Night prepare to make their way to Paradox's Altar for their own reasons. The Licht Kreis, a foreign group of In-births intent on policing the usage of EXS around the world has returned to Japan to investigate the city's growing case of Voids and In-Births while the ancient group of In-Births known as the Night Blade continue to patrol their ancestral homeland.

By the end of the Exe:Late sub-series, Hyde and Linne confront Amnesia's leader, Hilda the Paradox and bring an end to her plans. However, the true mastermind behind Hilda's movements, among many others, Linne's older brother, and the original wielder of Hyde's sword, Kuon the Aeon has yet to show himself during the Hollow Night. He would reveal himself a month after Hilda and Hyde are defeated. For months, Hilda temporarily becomes a Zero Vessel and loses her power, before she regains it back. When Kuon makes his true plans that will lead to the destruction of the world, Linne sets out to fight him alone.

=== Characters ===
The original release of the game included ten playable characters, with two more being added post-launch before the game was retitled to Exe:Late. The roster currently has a total of twenty eight characters as of Under Night In-Birth II [Sys:Celes] and one of its Season Pass DLC, with two guest characters from other fighting games. Most of these characters who are added after the original title originally either non-playable or being referred by most of them in previous entries. The game has Japanese-language voice acting. Some characters who first appeared in Exe:Late to Exe:Late[st] later appeared in BlazBlue: Cross Tag Battle, where they received English voice actors for the first time.

==== Introduced in the original release and Exe:Late subseries ====
- Hyde Kido (城戸 灰都(キド ハイド), Kido Haido): A second-year high school student and the protagonist of the series. He is attacked by a Void on his way home from school, is saved by Linne, but still awakens as an in-birth. Feeling indebted to her, he joins her cause in stopping Hilda's plans, and agrees to eventually cede to her wish and end her immortal life. He gains the ability to wield the legendary blade called the Insulator that holds the power to kill immortals. Despite his newcomer status, Hyde is able to contend with more experienced in-births due to the Insulator's power. Hyde is successful in ending Hilda's plans and bring about a relative peace to the city before Kuon's return brings about the Final Night. Hyde is childhood friends with Yuzuriha, friends with Orie and Tsurugi, a rival to Seth, and Vatista's caretaker.
- Linne (リンネ, Rinne): The ancient immortal princess of the Night Blade who has roamed the country for the past 500 years. She was cursed as an immortal alongside her older brother, where Linne's soul transfers to a new host body against her will every time she dies. Linne and Waldstein arrive in Kanzakai, which was close by to the ancestral home of the Night Blade 500 years ago, to investigate the rising cases of in-births and EXS-related activity. Linne and Waldstein identify Amnesia and its leader Hilda as targets to deal with unless Hilda completes her goals of becoming a Re-Birth and becoming a larger threat. During her investigation, Linne runs into Hyde and later saves him from a Void attack but she fails to prevent him from becoming an in-birth. However, Hyde's ability holds the potential for Linne to permanently die so she decides to train Hyde with Wald, making a promise to Hyde for him to one day end her life. Linne's current body is that of an elementary school student. Linne was also involved with a young Seth ten years prior to the story where Seth promised her that he would be the one to save her from being immortal.
- Waldstein (ワレンシュタイン, Warenshutain): A giant and brutish half-Void who fights with weaponized armed claws. He has some wisdom gained from his centuries-long life. He is a former high-ranking member of Licht Kreis before his defection to Night Blade after a war between two organizations, particularly after Kuon saved him from becoming a Void-Fallen. Honoring his oath to Kuon, Waldstein served as Linne's guardian and father-figure for over 500 years. With Kuon's return, Waldstein leaves Linne and joins Kuon's plans to bring out the Immortalize, if only to have his rematch with the man who once both defeated and saved him.
- Carmine Prime (カーマイン・プライム, Kāmain Puraimu): A delinquent and solitary third-year high school student. His prowess has gained the attention of many in-birth organizations across the city, but his severe aversion to groups has him antagonize nearly everyone he meets. He uses a red substance in battle which he thinks is his blood, and thus suffers from placebo wherein he feels weakened should he use his powers for too long. Carmine was scouted by Gordeau to join Amensia to which Carmine vehemently refused and promised to show up and beat them down for the trouble. Carmine is later defeated by Kuon and Carmine swears revenge on him.
- Orie Ballardiae (オリエ・バラーディア, Orie Barādia): A second-year high school student and a fifth-rank Executor of the Licht Kreis. She was orphaned ten years prior to the story where her parents were killed by a Void who had the ability to speak. She was recruited into the Licht Kreis and trained as one of their executors, befriending Lex, Kaguya, and Mika, and becoming the squad leader of the group. She is sent to Kanzaki alongside her friend Lex Bartholomew, to go undercover, observe, and report on the worsening In-birth situation in Kanzakai as a student "Orie Harada" ("原田 織依"(ハラダ オリエ), "Harada Orie"). She becomes close friends with Hyde after transferring to his school.
- Gordeau the Harvester (ハーヴスター・ゴルドー, Hābesutā Gorudō; Harvester Gordeau): A bartender, and one of the co-founders of Amnesia, an organization seeking to dominate the Hollow Night. Gordeau is considered one of the most powerful in-births in the city and was responsible for bringing Chaos into Amnesia's fold after realizing they desperately needed someone with intelligence to guide their actions. He leaves the organization after an accident involving the death of a friend and fellow Amnesia founder, Roger the Survivor (サーヴイヴー・ロジャー, Sābaibā Rojā; Survivor Roger), who was transformed into a Void-Fallen during the same night Amnesia dueled against Bankikai. Gordeau provisionally returns to Amnesia as a mercenary for hire, both defending Hilda's goals while also hunting for Wagner for killing Roger. Gordeau finds it unbecoming for someone his age to feel so powerless and grudge-bearing when he fully knows Wagner saved his life where he hesitated to put Roger down.
- Merkava (メルカヴァ, Merukava): A mysterious humanoid-Void capable of speech. He is amnesiac, before he was transformed into a monster. He was once a human allegedly seeking to become a Re-Birth, but the process failed and he was left with a human conscious living inside a Void's body, constantly driven to sate an unnatural hunger. Merkava is all but confirmed to be the Void behind the death of Orie's parents. As a Void, Merkava does not use EXS, but a power known as False (abbreviated as "FLS"). He is the only character to have two Arcade endings in Sys:Celes, with using Infinite Worth EXS against Kuon in the final stage of Arcade Mode results a bad ending, while his good ending has him revert to a human once again.
- Vatista (バティスタ, Batisuta): Unit code, 10,067. An ancient "Autonomic Nerve" designed as an anti-Void weapon from eons past. Due to her inhuman origin, she lacks common sense and understanding of human society and social norms. 500 years ago, she gave her seventh wing to Kuon that eventually became the Insulator to save Waldstein's life. Vatista awakens from her slumber in the present day due to the massive fluctuations of EXS in the city, and she seeks to find the one responsible. Like Merkava, Vatista uses the power of FLS rather than EXS. She meets Hyde out in the Night and when Hilda's defeat unexpectedly has Vatista still operational, Vatista concludes that her mission was not complete. Vatista tells Hyde that she planned to stay awake and wait in the park for another month but he offers her to stay at home.
- Seth the Assassin (アサシン・セト, Asashin Seto; Assassin Seth): A first-year high school student and a descendant of the original Night Blade clansmen. He met Linne ten years ago, when she was inhabiting another body named Chitose (チトセ). Seth made a promise to her that he would free her from the immortality forced upon her but his powers were incompatible with his goals. In the present day, he gains a pair of daggers named the Eliminators from Chaos, who himself was supplied by an unknown benefactor, in exchange for his skills to be used for Amnesia's purposes in targeting problematic In-births in the city that would threaten their position. Seth accepts the offer as the Eliminators give him the chance he always sought after to save Linne from her fate. Seth seeks to end Kuon and Linne's tortured lives and absolve his family line of their crimes. He is a rival to Hyde because of this as Hyde is reluctant to end Linne's immortality.
- Yuzuriha (ユズリハ): A carefree swordswoman hailing from the clan who abandoned the Night Blade centuries ago and founded the Dual Moon Single-Blade Style of swordsmanship. Wielding her family heirloom the Iris Blade: Kamiji-no-Homare, nicknamed "Ayame" (アヤメ), Yuzuriha acts as the neighborhood guardian, patrolling the night to subdue quarreling in-births and save people from Void attacks. She is a childhood friend of Hyde, before an awkward incident led to them avoiding each other.
- Hilda the Paradox (パラドックス・ヒルダ, Paradokkusu Hiruda; Paradox Hilda): The first boss character of the original release and Exe:Late sub-series, and the leader and co-founder of Amnesia alongside Gordeau and Roger. She seeks to become a Re-Birth due to her exceptional EXS capacity. Her excessive use of her powers have caused her "other-self" to take over her psyche, slowly turning her more unhinged and bloodthirsty to the point it has evolved her powers. Hilda is eventually defeated by Hyde and her ambitions are temporarily put on hold. Her second attempt to become a Re-Birth is personally thwarted by a restored Kuon. Hilda returns to make her third and final bid at becoming a Re-Birth in the Final Night.
- Bloody Chaos (ブラッディ・ケイアス, Buraddi Keiasu): Real name Kei Asuma (明日真 景(アスマ ケイ), Asuma Kei). Amnesia's chief tactician and de-facto second-in-command who has the ability to project and manifest a creature based on the catalyst of his choosing that is limited to books. He is accompanied by Azhi Dahaka (アジ・ダハーカ, Azi Dahāka), a monstrous lizard-like Void summoned from the Chaos Code stolen from a Licht Kreis facility shortly before joining Amnesia. He is the one who hired Seth with the Eliminators he gained from an interested third party. Chaos is revealed to have been supporting Kuon for a considerable amount of time in order to learn the secrets of the Hollow Night. After Kuon regains his powers and announces the Final Night, Chaos breaks away and seeks to stop him.
- Nanase (ナナセ): A second-year middle school girl who is attacked by a Void and turned into an In-Birth. Misunderstanding how one becomes an In-Birth, she mistakenly believes Hyde to be responsible for her transformation despite him being the one who saved her. Later, Nanase temporarily has a truce with her pursuit of Hyde and follows Phonon's footsteps to join the EFG in Sys:Celes,
- Byakuya (ビャクヤ): A middle school boy accompanying his "sister", Tsukuyomi (ツクヨミ). In truth, Byakuya's real sister died in a car accident and Byakuya ventured into the night in a fit of sadness and rage. In an attempt to die out in the wilderness, Byakuya becomes an In-Birth when he encounters a powerful Void. Byakuya eventually meets Strix (ストリックス, Sutorikkusu), a former member of the disbanded Bankikai, who he insists on escorting around the Hollow Night because she resembles his sister. Strix accepts her role, because she cannot access her powers to defend herself as a result of becoming a Zero Vessel (器割れ(ゼロヴェセル), Zero Vesseru). He helps Strix search for her former fellow member, Zohar, who went insane after being tainted by the Abyss as well as the presumed death of their leader, Ogre.
- Phonon the Chemeti (シュメティ・フォノン, Shumeti Fonon; Chemeti Phonon): Real name Yoshiko (良子(ヨシコ)). Nanase's upperclassman and childhood-friend with a chūnibyō personality. She is recruited to join a student-led organization called the Exist Force Guardians (EFG), who seek to protect their fellow students from Voids and groups of other In-Births as an on-and-off member. Phonon joined at the promise of receiving a weapon, where she receives her pet-snake and whip Muniel. Phonon expresses her intent to leave the organization multiple times as she finds the rules of the EFG too limiting but frequently cites her affiliation with them.
- Mika Returna (ミカ・リターナ, Mika Ritāna): A tenth rank Executor of Licht Kreis and a member of Orie's team. She is reckless, stubborn and hyperactive to the point she is often punished by her superiors for her hastiness. Despite her petite frame, she wields extraordinary strength and her gauntlets amplify them even further. Mika was initially meant to be sent to Japan alongside Orie and Lex for their assignment but her failure to pass a written exam barred her from leaving. Mika decides to stage a daring escape from Licht Kreis headquarters and boards a plane that is shot down and is forced to survive on a remote island before trying to reach Japan by raft. Mika is eventually able to reach Japan and reunite with her friends.
- Gaien Enkidou (円鬼堂 凱庵(エンキドゥ ガイエン), Enkidō Gaien): An experienced martial artist who goes by simply Enkidu (エンキドゥ). He felt that human opponents did not challenge him enough for his quest for strength and became an In-Birth to challenge those with supernatural abilities. Enkidu's EXS powers are pointed out by multiple characters as being incredibly faint and that his combat prowess is predominantly his own skills in martial arts. He ends up joining Amnesia after Hilda promises him that in their organization's quest for dominance she will provide him all the worthwhile challengers he seeks. He particularly wishes to duel Gordeau and Waldstein. After achieving victory over Waldstein, he leaves Amnesia and later sides with Kuon in Sys:Celes who similarly promises him the prospect of fighting many powerful challengers seeking to stop his plans. The shackle on his wrist is revealed to be suppressing an entity separate from the alter-ego that is within every in-birth.
- Miyashiro Erika Wagner (宮代(ミヤシロ)・エリカ・ワーグナー, Miyashiro Erika Wāgunā): A high-ranking fourth rank Executor of Licht Kreis and the scion of the esteemed Wagner family who have faithfully served the Licht Kreis for at least five centuries. Famed as the prodigious "Void Hunter", she is Orie's self-proclaimed rival after a perceived slight. Wagner was sent to school in Japan as both punishment for her previous misconduct and to grow past her sheltered upbringing. She is usually accompanied by her two aides, Sakurai and Murayama. She was responsible for mercy-killing Roger when he transformed into a Void-Fallen after the duel between Ogre and Hilda. Initially attending a prestigious all-girls academy, she later transfers to the same school as Hyde, Orie, Seth, Carmine, and Tsurugi.
- Londrekia Light (ロンドレキア・ライト, Rondorekia Raito): Wagner's self-proclaimed rival and a member of Ritter Schild, a male-only branch organization of Licht Kreis resulting from Waldstein's defection to the Night Blade that made Licht Kreis' supreme leader Adelheid exile all the men from her organization. Londrekia was created specifically to defeat the heirs of the Wagner bloodline and has cryo-based abilities to counter the Wagner's fire-based abilities. He ultimately seeks to have both organizations make amends and unite again to strengthen their ability to help and protect others. He becomes acquainted with Merkava and offers him a chance to become human again should the Ritter Schild find a way to reverse his condition.

==== Introduced in II [Sys:Celes] ====
- Kuon the Aeon (永劫のクオン, Eigō no Kuon) The second boss character of the series and Linne's older brother. Before becoming a Re-Birth, he was once a noble leader of the Night Blade and the original wielder of the Insulator before Hyde. After many centuries of harboring the Seal of Immortality, he progressively became more corrupted and his transformation into a Re-Birth changed his physiology, where half of his human body transformed into that of a Void. He currently fights with eight floating blades resembling the Insulator as well as manipulating raw EXS as projectiles. He was also responsible for giving Seth the Eliminators through Chaos and arranging certain characters to move according to his plans. His goal is to amass EXS to tear through the Hollow Night, access the world of Voids, and hunt down a particular individual who was responsible for the Insulator's disappearance after the Litch Kreis War, an entity known as Higan (ヒガン). The fruition of Kuon's plans would result in a world merge between human and void worlds, destroying the former world.
- Kaguya Jingu (カグヤ・ジングウ, Kaguya Jingū): A sixth rank Executor of Licht Kreis and the long-range support for Orie’s Executor squad. Unlike her friends who come from orphaned backgrounds, Kaguya hails from a renowned family with ties to the Licht Kreis. However, it is revealed that Kaguya was forced to kill her father in self-defense after manifesting her abilities along with her pistols in her youth. Kaguya wandered the streets for a time before being discovered and defeated by a young Silvaria who subsequently had Kaguya join the Licht Kreis. She was originally assigned a different mission from Orie and Lex, but she returns to Kanzakai to confront Kuon.
- Tsurugi (ツルギ): The second in-command of the EFG who wields a shield as long as he is tall. He is also one of Hyde's friends at school. He is responsible for bringing in new members for the organization and is considered the group's most capable fighter. When Kuon plans to conquer the world during a Final Night, Tsurugi is sent out by the EFG President Sakaki to deal with Kuon.
- Uzuki the Black Monger (ブラックモンガー•ウズキ, Burakkumongā Uzuki; Black Monger Uzuki): A disturbing pink-haired necromancer who was formerly a top member of Amnesia. She was made leader of her own unit with two subordinates, J.J. and Tempest. Uzuki leaves Amnesia along with her accomplices in Sys:Celes because she never got along with organization head Hilda and because of Amnesia's general lack of activity. As confirmed by Vatista and Byakuya, Uzuki's EXS is actually an FLS, which is associated to Voids and Autonomic Nerves. Because of her nature as an FLS user who retained her human appearances instead of being transformed into a Void, Uzuki is an entity that resembles a Re-Birth despite saying that she does not consider herself one.
- Ogre (オーガ, Ōga): The leader of the defunct organization, Bankikai, whose power and notoriety once rivaled Hilda from Amnesia. Ogre has the ability to summon and empower himself from his Gate of Hades ability, allowing him to empower his physical attacks and transform into a horned Void-like form. Ogre disappeared on the night Amnesia and Bankikai faced off in a duel when the aftermath of the conflict was cut short after a Void-Fallen Roger attacked everyone involved. Ogre saves Gordeau's life and was thought to have died following his disappearance. Nine months later, Ogre mysteriously reappears in the city, and sets out into the Night to learn the circumstances of his return.
- Izumi Shirogane (白銀 泉(シロガネ イズミ)): A mysterious white haired young girl and an acquaintance of EFG. She earned the moniker "Serene". She is guided by a mysterious fish creature Elefee (エレフェ, Erefe), the third known Indulgence Weapon besides Insulator and Eliminator, which serves as a final key to unlock the door of the Final Night. Untransformed, Elefee's takes the form of Izumi's shawl. Izumi wishes to be free from Elefee when her duty comes to an end.

Zohar (ゾハル, Zoharu) The co-leader of Bankikai and a former second in command to the leader Ogre. She was replaced by her close friend Strix, due to the nature of her EXS ability. After surviving the battle with Amnesia, yet suffering split personality disorde by the effecfs of Abyss which corrupt her EXS, and also corrupted and killed Amnesia member, Roger into a Void-Fallen, Zohar sets out to find Strix and Byakuya.

==== Guest Characters ====
- Sion Eltnum Altasia (シオン＝エルトナム＝アトラシア) from the fighting game series for Tsukihime franchise, Melty Blood. She is referred to as Eltnum (エルトナム) within the game's context. One of the main characters in Melty Blood, Sion's role in the story of Under Night In-Birth is unserious, self-referential, and fourth-wall breaking. She often remarks on other fighters as if they are novices and shows awareness that she is a character from French-Bread's past games, with Sys:Celes has her sought to find a luminous place for her full debut in Tsukihime remake timeline, after the era of A piece of blue glass moon. This awareness extends to meta-references about appearing in arcade games and information related to that subject, such as the Sega Naomi hardware used for Melty Blood Actress Again and Team Arcana's defunct parent company, Examu.
- Akatsuki (アカツキ) from Subtle Style’s fighting game series Akatsuki Shisei Ichigō/Blitzkampf, and its sequel EN-Eins Perfektewelt, who served as the titular protagonist of the former game. He has no role to the main story, but little known about his displaced involvement this series' storyline takes place during his titular game's canon storyline between his venture at China, and prior to his encounter with Kanae and Fritz, during his return to Japan. However, in contrast to his actual displaced storyline in this series, his win quote in Sys:Celes mistakenly took place between his game and EN-Eins. Initially, during Exe:Late sub-series, unlike Sion, Akatsuki is in no way self aware and only looking for a way to return to his duties. Though he ultimately becomes aware of his displaced involvement in the main story of the game.

== Development ==
Release timeline
2012	Under Night In-Birth
2013	Under Night In-Birth Exe:Late
2014–2016
2017	Under Night In-Birth Exe:Late[st]
2018–2019
2020	Under Night In-Birth Exe:Late[cl-r]

Under Night In-Birth began development in 2010. The game's producer, Nobuya Narita, explained that development arose from the team's experiences working on Melty Blood, and a tentative remake of the game. French-Bread originally planned to work in high definition for the remake, but development later stalled while Type-Moon went on to work on Witch on the Holy Night. Early prototypes provided the foundation for Under Night In-Birth. Narita emphasized they wanted to differentiate the game from Melty Blood, so the lore, visuals, systems and combat flow are very different from the previous game. It marked the team's first game using high definition and hand-drawn high-resolution sprites. Due to the challenges they faced working in high definition with high-resolution assets for the first time, the French-Bread staff members frequently consulted BlazBlue game creator Toshimichi Mori.

A decade later, French-Bread and Type-Moon would later work together again to continue development on the Melty Blood HD remake project. With the studio's work on Under Night In-Birth serving as the foundation, the previously untitled remake was announced as Melty Blood: Type Lumina, a reboot game to the Melty Blood series and a tie-in to the remake timeline of Tsukihime franchise.

== Reception ==
Reception

Aggregate score
Aggregator	Score
Metacritic	PS3: 80/100; PC: 81/100; PS4: 78/100; NS: 82/100; PS4 (cl-r): 80/100

Review scores
Publication	Score
Destructoid	9/10
Eurogamer	8/10
Famitsu	29/40
Hardcore Gamer	4/5
IGN	8/10

The PlayStation 3 version of the game received a 29/40 by Famitsu. Reviewers appreciated the ease of the controls but felt there was a barrier to entry and that the basics could be better explained. Kyle MacGregor of Destructoid said that it was "an intelligent, tactical fighting game that I'll surely be playing for a long time to come." Victor Ayora of IGN Spain said it was "One good fighting game. Maybe it's not as deep as previous Arc System Works games, but successfully achieves what it is aiming: to let the player enjoy it." Biagio Etna of IGN Italy lauded the art and combat system but criticized the steep learning curve and the pacing of the visual novel-style Chronicle Mode introduced in Exe:Late[st]. Filippo Facchetti of Eurogamer concluded "an interesting 2D fighting game with a very unique fighting system. Just try it, and you'll be amazed."

=== Awards ===
Exe:Late[cl-r] was nominated for the category of Best Fighting Game at The Game Awards 2020, but lost to Mortal Kombat 11.

== See also ==
- Skullgirls
- Melty Blood
- Akatsuki Blitzkampf
- Dengeki Bunko: Fighting Climax
- BlazBlue: Cross Tag Battle
