= Dengeki Bunko: Fighting Climax =

2014 video game

- Japanese PS Vita cover art
- Developers: Ecole Software; French Bread
- Publisher: Sega
- Director: Takaharu Terada
- Producer: Ryutaro Nonaka
- Composer: Yui Isshiki Sega Digital Studio: Kenichi Tokoi Tomoyuki Nakazawa Teruhiko Nakagawa Naofumi Hataya Tadashi Kinukawa Hideaki Kobayashi Tomonori Sawada Mitsuharu Fukuyama Tatsuyuki Maeda Tomoya Ohtani Jun Senoue
- Platforms: Arcade, PlayStation 4, PlayStation 3, PlayStation Vita
- Release: Arcade: JP: March 18, 2014; PlayStation 3, PlayStation Vita: JP: November 13, 2014; NA: October 6, 2015; EU: October 6, 2015; Ignition: Arcade: JP: July 28, 2015; PlayStation 4, PlayStation 3, PlayStation Vita: JP: December 17, 2015
- Genre: Fighting game
- Modes: Single-player, multiplayer
- Arcade system: Sega RingEdge 2

Dengeki Bunko: Fighting Climax (Note: Japanese: 電撃文庫 FIGHTING CLIMAX, Hepburn: Dengeki Bunko Faitingu Kuraimakkusu) is a 2D arcade fighting game developed by Ecole Software and French Bread and published by Sega. The game celebrates the 20th anniversary of ASCII Media Works' Dengeki Bunko imprint, featuring various characters from light novels published under the imprint. The game was first released in Japanese arcades in March 2014, and later released on PlayStation 3 and PlayStation Vita on November 13, 2014. The console version was released in North America and Europe in October 2015. The game's theme song is "Belief" by Mami Kawada.

An updated version of the game, titled Dengeki Bunko: Fighting Climax Ignition (電撃文庫 FIGHTING CLIMAX IGNITION, Dengeki Bunko Faitingu Kuraimakkusu Igunishion), was released in July 2015. The update contains additional characters and more balanced gameplay. The updated version was released on PlayStation 3, PlayStation 4 and PlayStation Vita in December 2015 only in Japan. The updated version's theme song is "ID" by LiSA.

== Gameplay ==
Dengeki Bunko: Fighting Climax is a two-dimensional fighting game, in which two players fight against each using both a playable fighter character and an assist character. Fighting uses three main attack buttons: weak, medium, and strong, along with a support button used for summoning a player's assist character. After an assist character is summoned, players need to rebuild their support gauge before they can summon them again. By building the Climax Gauge with attacks, players can perform powerful Impact Skill attacks, and can also use Blast Icons to perform Blast Attacks, allowing them to escape from combos. The home version features an original story campaign, Dream Duel Story, and online multiplayer, and supports cross-save functionality between the PS3 and Vita versions. Samples from the represented light novel series are also included as unlockable content.

In the Ignition update, it adds another assist character slot, but for Blast only instead of Assist. A new system called Ignition is introduced, giving one character in each team a power-up after each round. From the second round on, if the same Ignition on the team's character from the previous round is reused, it gives an "Extra Ignition".

== Character roster ==
The initial roster features 12 playable characters and 18 assist characters from 22 light novels and the current roster is 19 playable characters and 30 assist characters. The roster features characters under the Dengeki Bunko imprint, among playable characters and assist characters that can be called while in the middle of a round to help the playable character in various ways. All characters are voiced by their respective actors from the anime adaptations, with a few exceptions. A non-playable character known as Denshin (電神) (voiced by Mao), based on the Dreamcast character from Sega Hard Girls, summons the playable characters for their aid to combat a malevolent entity (voiced by Ken Narita) from the organization Zetsumu who takes the form of the captured playable characters, followed by a form of Akira Yuki from Sega's Virtua Fighter series, with Pai Chan as his assist, as boss characters; both Akira and Pai later became playable characters in the console ports and post-Version 1.20 arcade versions.

Eight additional characters (four playable and four assists) were added to the roster by mid-2014. The second Sega guests, Selvaria Bles and Alicia Melchiott of Valkyria Chronicles, first appeared in the console ports and later added to the arcade version 1.30, along with other assist characters from other Dengeki Bunko's published series. The games' various stages and their accompanying music tracks are based on other Sega titles, such as Sonic the Hedgehog, Nights into Dreams..., Shinobi, Border Break, Valkyria Chronicles, 7th Dragon and Phantasy Star Online 2. The DLC characters from Sword Art Online, Yuuki and the assist Llenn, were released on December 25, 2015. DLC characters from And you thought there is never a girl online?, Ako and the assist Rusian, was included in a future update.

=== Playable characters ===
Character	Series	Voice actor	Arcade revision	Original	Ignition
Akira Yuki^{a}	Virtua Fighter	Shin-ichiro Miki	1.2	Yes ^{b}^{c}	Yes
Ako^{a}^{e}^{g}	And You Thought There Is Never a Girl Online?	Rina Hidaka	2.3	No	Yes
Asuna	Sword Art Online	Haruka Tomatsu	1.0	Yes	Yes
Emi Yusa^{a}^{e}	The Devil Is a Part-Timer!	Yōko Hikasa	2.0	No	Yes
Kirino Kosaka	Oreimo	Ayana Taketatsu	1.0	Yes	Yes
Kirito	Sword Art Online	Yoshitsugu Matsuoka	1.0	Yes	Yes
Kuroko Shirai^{a}^{e}	A Certain Magical Index / A Certain Scientific Railgun	Satomi Arai	2.15	No	Yes
Kuroyukihime	Accel World	Sachika Misawa	1.0	Yes	Yes
Mikoto Misaka	A Certain Magical Index / A Certain Scientific Railgun	Rina Satō	1.0	Yes	Yes
Miyuki Shiba^{a}^{f}	The Irregular at Magic High School	Saori Hayami	1.1	Yes	Yes
Qwenthur Barbotage^{e}	Heavy Object	Natsuki Hanae	2.0	No	Yes
Rentarō Satomi^{a}	Black Bullet	Yuki Kaji	1.15	Yes	Yes
Selvaria Bles^{a}	Valkyria Chronicles	Sayaka Ohara	1.2	Yes ^{b}	Yes
Shana	Shakugan no Shana	Rie Kugimiya	1.0	Yes	Yes
Shizuo Heiwajima	Durarara!!	Daisuke Ono	1.0	Yes	Yes
Taiga Aisaka^{a}	Toradora!	Rie Kugimiya	1.1	Yes	Yes
Tatsuya Shiba^{a}^{f}	The Irregular at Magic High School	Yuichi Nakamura	2.1	No	Yes
Tomoka Minato	Ro-Kyu-Bu!	Kana Hanazawa	1.0	Yes	Yes
Yukina Himeragi^{a}	Strike the Blood	Risa Taneda	1.15	Yes	Yes
Yuuki^{a}^{e}^{g}	Sword Art Online	Aoi Yūki	2.2	No	Yes

=== Assist characters ===
Character	Series	Voice actor	Arcade revision	Original	Ignition
Accelerator and Last Order^{a}	A Certain Magical Index/A Certain Scientific Accelerator	Nobuhiko Okamoto and Rina Hidaka	1.2	Yes	Yes
Alicia Melchiott	Valkyria Chronicles	Marina Inoue	1.2	Yes ^{a}^{b}	Yes
Boogiepop	Boogiepop	Kaori Shimizu	1.0	Yes	Yes
Celty Sturluson	Durarara!!	Miyuki Sawashiro	1.0	Yes	Yes
Dokuro Mitsukai^{a}	Bludgeoning Angel Dokuro-chan	Saeko Chiba	1.2	Yes	Yes
Enju Aihara^{a}	Black Bullet	Rina Hidaka	1.15	Yes	Yes
Erio Tōwa	Ground Control to Psychoelectric Girl	Asuka Ōgame	1.0	Yes	Yes
Floretia Capistrano^{a}^{e}	Heavy Object	Shizuka Itō	2.0	No	Yes
Haruyuki Arita	Accel World	Yuuki Kaji	1.0	Yes	Yes
Hinata Hakamada^{d}	Ro-Kyu-Bu!	Yui Ogura	1.0	Yes	Yes
Holo	Spice and Wolf	Ami Koshimizu	1.0	Yes	Yes
Iriya Kana^{a}^{e}	Iriya no Sora, UFO no Natsu	Ai Nonaka	2.15	No	Yes
Izaya Orihara^{a}	Durarara!!	Hiroshi Kamiya	1.2	Yes	Yes
Kazari Uiharu^{a}^{e}	A Certain Magical Index/A Certain Scientific Railgun	Aki Toyosaki	2.15	No	Yes
Kino	Kino's Journey	Aya Hisakawa	1.0	Yes	Yes
Kōko Kaga	Golden Time	Yui Horie	1.0	Yes	Yes
Kojou Akatsuki^{a}	Strike the Blood	Yoshimasa Hosoya	1.15	Yes	Yes
Kuroneko	Oreimo	Kana Hanazawa	1.0	Yes	Yes
Leafa	Sword Art Online	Ayana Taketatsu	1.0	Yes	Yes
Llenn^{a}^{e}^{g}	Sword Art Online Alternative Gun Gale Online	Minami Tsuda	2.2	No	Yes
Mashiro Shiina	The Pet Girl of Sakurasou	Ai Kayano	1.0	Yes	Yes
Miyuki Shiba^{a}^{f}	The Irregular at Magic High School	Saori Hayami	2.1	No	Yes
Pai Chan^{a}	Virtua Fighter	Minami Takayama	1.2	Yes ^{b}^{c}	Yes
Rusian^{a}^{d}^{e}^{g}	And you thought there is never a girl online?	Toshiyuki Toyonaga	2.3	No	Yes
Ryūji Takasu^{a}^{d}	Toradora!	Junji Majima	1.1	Yes	Yes
Sadao Maō	The Devil Is a Part-Timer!	Ryōta Ōsaka	1.0	Yes	Yes
Tatsuya Shiba^{a}^{f}	The Irregular at Magic High School	Yuichi Nakamura	1.1	Yes	Yes
Toma Kamijo	A Certain Magical Index	Atsushi Abe	1.0	Yes	Yes
Tomo Asama^{a}^{e}	Horizon in the Middle of Nowhere	Ami Koshimizu	2.15	No	Yes
Wilhelmina Carmel	Shakugan no Shana	Shizuka Itō	1.0	Yes	Yes
Zero^{a}^{e}	Grimoire of Zero	Karin Takahashi	2.15	No	Yes

=== Other characters ===
Characters who appear for certain playable characters' Special and Super Moves
Character	Series	Voice actor	Arcade revision	Original	Ignition
Heivia Winchell^{a}^{e}	Heavy Object	Kaito Ishikawa	2.0	No	Yes
Milinda Brantini^{a}^{e}	Heavy Object	Eri Suzuki	2.0	No	Yes
Airi Kashii	Ro-Kyu-Bu!	Rina Hidaka	1.0	Yes	Yes
Alas Ramus^{e}	The Devil Is a Part-Timer!	Unknown	2.0	No	Yes
Maho Misawa	Ro-Kyu-Bu!	Yuka Iguchi	1.0	Yes	Yes
Saki Nagatsuka	Ro-Kyu-Bu!	Yoko Hikasa	1.0	Yes	Yes

Notes

- ^a: Available as extra, post-arcade and console release content.
- ^b: Unlockable, but unplayable in Arcade and Dream Duel Modes in original game's console version.
- ^c: Akira and Pai were originally non-playable in pre-console release arcade versions of original game.
- ^d: Also appears for certain playable characters' Special and Super Moves.
- ^e: Introduced in Ignition.
- ^f: Both playable and assist characters. If certain playable characters are selected, certain playable characters will instead be assist characters and cannot be selected as the same character who has already been selected from the playable roster in Ignition.
- ^g: Downloadable characters in "Ignition".

== Reception ==
Reception

Aggregate scores
Aggregator	Score
GameRankings	67.06%(PS3); 73.20% (Vita)
Metacritic	66% (PS3); 75% (Vita)

Review score
Publication	Score
Destructoid	65%

Awarding it 4 out of 5, Hardcore Gamer described it as "a love-letter to anime and Sega fans". In contrast, PlayStation Lifestyle awarded it a score of 5.5 out of 10, writing that "although solid enough as a fighting game, the emphasis here is certainly not on gameplay and can often leave newcomers disconnected from the fun." Destructoid said that it "may be too simplistic for most hardcore fighting game fans to enjoy as anything more than an ephemeral lark, but also perhaps still too complex for those that find the genre intimidating."

The PlayStation 3 version of Dengeki Bunko: Fighting Climax sold 34,671 copies within its first week in Japan, placing it at number six on the video game sales chart, while the PlayStation Vita version sold 25,607 copies in the same week, placing it at number nine on the chart.

== See also ==
- Dengeki Gakuen RPG: Cross of Venus
- Dengeki Bunko: Crossing Void
- Under Night In-Birth
