= Melty Blood =

Video game series

- Cover of the first game

メルティブラッド (Meruti Buraddo)
- Video game
- Developer: Type-Moon; Watanabe Seisakujo
- Genre: Fighting game, visual novel
- Platform: Microsoft Windows
- Released: JP: December 30, 2002
- Video game

Melty Blood Re-ACT
- Developer: Type-Moon; French-Bread
- Platform: Microsoft Windows
- Released: JP: May 30, 2004
- Video game

Melty Blood Act Cadenza
- Developer: Type-Moon; French-Bread; Ecole Software
- Publisher: Sega (Arcade); Ecole Software (PS2)
- Platform: Arcade (Sega Naomi); PlayStation 2 Microsoft Windows
- Released: Arcade: JP: March 25, 2005; PlayStation 2: JP: August 10, 2006; Microsoft Windows: JP: July 27, 2007
- Manga
- Written by: Takeru Kirishima
- Published by: Kadokawa Shoten
- Magazine: Comp Ace
- Original run: June 2005 – August 2011
- Volumes: 9
- Video game

Melty Blood Actress Again
- Developer: Type-Moon; French-Bread; Ecole Software
- Publisher: Sega (arcade); Ecole Software (PS2)
- Platform: Arcade (Sega Naomi); PlayStation 2
- Released: Arcade: JP: September 19, 2008; PlayStation 2: JP: August 20, 2009
- Video game

Melty Blood Actress Again Current Code
- Developer: Type-Moon; French-Bread; Ecole Software
- Publisher: Sega (arcade); Arc System Works (Steam)
- Platform: Arcade (Sega RingWide); Microsoft Windows
- Released: Arcade: JP: July 29, 2010 (Note: 1.05 title update was released on May 18, 2011. 1.07 title update was released on October 14, 2011.); Microsoft Windows: JP: December 30, 2011; WW: April 19, 2016
- Manga

Melty Blood X
- Written by: Takeru Kirishima
- Published by: Kadokawa Shoten
- Magazine: Comp Ace
- Original run: May 2011 – November 2011
- Volumes: 2
- Manga

Hana no Miyako
- Written by: Takeru Kirishima
- Published by: Kadokawa Shoten
- Magazine: Comp Ace
- Original run: January 2013 – August 2014
- Volumes: 3
- Manga

Melty Blood Back Alley Alliance Nightmare
- Written by: Takeru Kirishima
- Published by: Kadokawa Shoten
- Magazine: Comp Ace
- Original run: December 2015 – October 2016
- Volumes: 2

Melty Blood (メルティブラッド, Meruti Buraddo), sometimes shortened as Merubura (メルブラ), is a series of 2D visual novel fighting video games, co-developed by dōjin circles Type-Moon and French-Bread as the meta-sequel of Type-Moon's first visual novel Tsukihime.

The first game was originally released at Comiket in December 2002, and later spawned multiple sequels, such as an arcade version titled Act Cadenza, developed by Ecole Software, which was ported to the PlayStation 2, the first Type-Moon game to receive a console release.

A manga series, written and illustrated by Takeru Kirishima, was first serialized in Kadokawa Shoten manga magazine Comp Ace in 2006. The series ended in 2011 with nine bound volumes released in Japan.

While the original timeline series ends with Actress Again and its updates, it continues with a reboot timeline series which takes place in a remade Tsukihime timeline continuity, first depicted in Tsukihime -A piece of blue glass moon-, as well as the prequel to the timeline, Witch on the Holy Night, starting from Melty Blood: Type Lumina since 2021.

== Gameplay ==
Melty Blood makes use of widely used concepts in fighting games such as cancels (canceling a normal attack with a special attack before its animation ends, allowing for more complex and damaging combos) chain combos (normal moves that cancel into other normal moves) and the use of super bars (Magic Circuits).

Unique to the game are mechanics like Shielding, an advanced defensive technique which can completely nullify damage from incoming attacks, as well as French-Bread Games' staple gameplay mechanic Reverse Beat, a type of chain combo that can cancel from a higher normal move to a weaker normal move. The series is also characterized by its freedom of movement, especially in the air, where players have access to a variety of options, including jumps, double jumps, super jumps, and air dashes, which can be combined to create complex, unpredictable movement not typically possible in other series.

The original series of games, culminating in Melty Blood: Actress Again: Current Code, features the Moon system. Similar to the groove system pioneered in Capcom vs. SNK 2, each character in the game has three different variants corresponding to the phases of the moon, which can be selected during character select. Each moon type includes baseline mechanics that apply to all characters of that moon, while each character will typically have a drastically different moveset depending on the selected moon, impacting normal as well as special moves.

The remake series of the game that started in Melty Blood: Type Lumina introduced many gameplay changes from the original series, with many players describing the gameplay as a combination of the Melty Blood games and French Bread's game series Under Night In-Birth. A new moon system exists in Type Lumina which functions more as a meter and provides access to additional techniques like Moon Skill attacks (similar to traditional EX attacks from other fighting games) and Moon Drive.

== Plot ==
The original Melty Blood game takes place one year after Tsukihime and a month after Kagetsu Tohya. In August 2001, Shiki Tohno hears of a new series of murders in Misaki Town, similar to the ones that took place in Tsukihime, in the last weeks of October 1999. Whilst searching for the murderer, he meets Sion Eltnam Atlasia, who initiates a fight with him, attempting to capture him. After the fight, she reveals that her reason for trying to capture him is to get in contact with the "True Ancestor" (referring to Arcueid) so that she may acquire information on the "cure for vampirism". Shiki then decides to help her with this task. The game's story moves through a series of fights. Depending on the outcome of the fight, the story will branch in one of two ways. This corresponds to the ending of the game.

=== Characters ===
As of Melty Blood Actress Again Current Code Ver. 1.07, there are 31 playable characters.

They have three Moons, with each providing new variation to normal moves, special moves, system mechanics, and gameplay feel. They consist of Crescent, Full, and Half Moon.

Tsukihime characters:

- Shiki Tohno (遠野 志貴, Tōno Shiki): Kenji Nojima
- Arcueid Brunestud (Arukweido Buryunsutaddo): Ryōka Yuzuki
- Ciel (シエル, Shieru): Kumi Sakuma
- Akiha Tohno (遠野 秋葉, Tōno Akiha): Hitomi
- Hisui (翡翠): Miyu Matsuki
- Kohaku (琥珀): Naoko Takano
- Aoko Aozaki (蒼崎 青子): Kotono Mitsuishi
- Satsuki Yumizuka (弓塚 さつき): Omi Minami
- Nrvnqsr Chaos (Nero Kaosu, Nero Chaos): Jouji Nakata
- Michael Roa Valdamjong (Mihairu Roa Barudamuyōn): Ken Narita
- Neco-Arc (猫アルク/ネコアルク, Neko Aruku): Ryōka Yuzuki

Kagetsu Tohya characters:

- Shiki Nanaya (七夜 志貴): Kenji Nojima
- Len (レン, Ren): Kaori Mizuhashi
- Kouma Kishima (軋間 紅摩, Kishima Kōma): Jūrōta Kosugi

The Garden of Sinners characters:

- Shiki Ryougi (両儀 式, Ryōgi Shiki): Maaya Sakamoto

New characters:

- Sion Eltnam Atlasia (Shion Erutonamu Atorashia): Rio Natsuki) - the main character of the original Melty Blood series
- Night of Wallachia (ワラキアの夜, Warakia no Yoru) (real name: Zepia Eltnam Oberon (ズェピア・エルトナム・オベローン, Zuepia Erutonamu Oberōn): Yasunori Masutani - the boss character for the first entry of the series
- Miyako Arima (有間 都古): Miwa Kōzuki - A bajiquan rookie, whose family used to temporarily adopt Shiki when the former was still young before the latter returned to the household
- Mech-Hisui (メカヒスイ, Meka-Hisui): Miyu Matsuki - A robot counterpart of the original Hisui, created by Kohaku
- White Len (白レン, Shiro Ren): Kaori Mizuhashi - Len's doppelganger, created from the remains of Zepia and the unused part of original Len by Aoko
- Riesbyfe Stridberg (Rīzubaife Sutorindovari): Akeno Watanabe - Sion's partner who died before the first game's events, but revived as a sentient TATARI
- Neco-Arc Chaos (ネコアルク・カオス, Neko Aruku Kaosu): Jouji Nakata
- Dust of Osiris (オシリスの砂, Oshirisu no Suna) (boss of Melty Blood Actress Again, full vampiric form of Sion Eltnam Atlasia from alternate timeline): Rio Natsuki - not playable in Current Code 1.07

Alternative/bosses, team-up slots and hidden characters:

- Akiha Vermillion (紅赤朱 秋葉, Kurenai Sekishu Akiha) or 赤主秋葉 Sekishu Akiha: Hitomi
- Hisui & Kohaku: Miyu Matsuki & Naoko Takano
- Sion TATARI (吸血鬼 シオン, Kyūketsuki Shion): Rio Natsuki
- G-Akiha (G秋葉): Hitomi - does not appear in Current Code 1.07
- Red Arcueid (暴走 アルクェイド, Bōsō Arukueido; Berserk Arcueid): Ryōka Yuzuki
- Damien Armies (ダミアン・アーミー, Damian Āmī) - does not appear in Current Code 1.07
- Neco Chaos Black G666 (Neko Kaosu Burakku G666): Jouji Nakata
- Kohaku & Mech-Hisui: Naoko Takano & Miyu Matsuki
- Neco-Arc & Mech-Hisui: Ryōka Yuzuki & Miyu Matsuki
- Seifuku Akiha (制服 秋葉, Akiha wearing school uniform): Hitomi
- Archetype:Earth (True Ancestor Arcueid (真祖 アルクェイド, Shinso Arcueid)): Ryōka Yuzuki - playable character and the boss in her route
- Powerd Ciel (Executioner Ciel (完全 武装 シエル, Kanzen Busō Shieru; Fully Armed Ciel)): Kumi Sakuma

In the original Melty Blood, only six (Sion, Arcueid, Ciel, Akiha, Kohaku & Hisui, and Shiki Tohno) of the characters above were available for play, with eight more being unlockable through story mode. However, in a later update released for the game (the "Nero" patch), all the characters are available from the start. The reasons for this are slightly unclear; it appears to be the result of a legal misunderstanding whereby Type-Moon mistakenly thought they would no longer be allowed to produce updates/patches, and thus made a "last patch" which unlocked the characters as a sort of gift for the fans. Whatever the case, Type-Moon has left these characters available throughout all subsequent releases. In addition, Aoko and Kouma were both added to the game as of Act Cadenza, although Aoko was an unplayable boss character in previous versions. Act Cadenza also changed the given names of several characters, generally to make it easier to identify the doppelgangers by name.

== Release ==
Release timeline
2002	Melty Blood
2003
2004	Melty Blood Re-ACT
2005	Melty Blood Act Cadenza
2005	Melty Blood Re-ACT Final Tuned
2006
2007	Melty Blood Act Cadenza Ver.B
2007	Melty Blood Act Cadenza Ver.B2
2008	Melty Blood Actress Again
2009
2010	Melty Blood Actress Again Current Code
2011	Melty Blood Actress Again Current Code Ver. 1.05
2011	Melty Blood Actress Again Current Code Ver. 1.07
2012–2020
2021	Melty Blood: Type Lumina
2022–2026
2027	Melty Blood: Twi-Lumina

=== Original timeline ===
==== Melty Blood ====
The original Melty Blood was announced on October 8, 2001, at Tsukihime Matsuri Himehajime (月姫祀〜秘初〜), the dōjin convention hosting only Tsukihime content. The plan was suggested by Nobuya Narita of Watanabe Seisakujo (French-Bread, from 2003). Kinoko Nasu wrote scenarios and Takashi Takeuchi designed characters. Watanabe Seisakujo developed the game system and pixel art. They were known as the creators of parody games, but Nasu requested not to break the style of Tsukihime. They had difficulty thinking of attacks because original characters didn't have an attractive skill suited for the fighting game. They also worked hard to create frames of animation exceeding Street Fighter III.

The full version of Melty Blood was released in December 2002 for Windows. An expansion patch, Re-ACT released two years later in May 2004, and an update, Re-ACT Final Tuned, released in July 2005. An arcade version of the series, Melty Blood Act Cadenza, was later developed by Ecole Software and released in March 2005. Later, a PlayStation 2 version of Act Cadenza was released on August 10, 2006. A Windows version, Melty Blood Act Cadenza Ver.B, was also released on July 27, 2007. The following entry in the series, Melty Blood Actress Again, was released on September 19, 2008. The series' newest game, Melty Blood: Type Lumina, was released on September 30, 2021.

==== Melty Blood Re-ACT ====
An expansion to the original game, featuring an 'Arcade Mode' whose storyline takes place after the original Melty Blood. The expansion made numerous changes in regards to character balance and removed many infinite-combo sequences. New movesets were created for the doppelgänger characters, whereas in the original, most of these characters had nearly identical movesets to their counterparts. It also made changes to the game's mechanics and added several new characters, though only two are playable while the other four remained as NPCs: Len, Satsuki Yumizuka, Neco-Arc (non-playable character) Executioner Ciel (Ciel holding the Seventh Holy Scripture, non-playable character), White Len (Sub Boss) and Aoko Aozaki (non-playable boss).

The final update to Re-ACT, Final Tuned, adds several features designed to allow the game to be configured to resemble the gameplay of Melty Blood Act Cadenza. It also adds a large number of gameplay tweaks and slightly updated animations, such as the inclusion of a new, analog-friendly controller setup; new configuration options that lets players assign multi-button commands to individual buttons; the ability to alter and adjust many of the game's internal variables (via new interface options); and four new colors for each player.

==== Melty Blood Act Cadenza ====
Melty Blood Act Cadenza was the first arcade port of the series and was published by Ecole Software. The visual novel was removed, while the Arcade Mode dialogue featured in Re-ACT returns. It completely revamped Aoko Aozaki's movelist for use as a playable character, and introduced Kouma Kishima into the series, a man who was deeply involved in Shiki Tohno's past. It also introduced the Shielding mechanic (separate from EX-Shielding), as well as including various changes to the properties of characters. This version (as well as the later released Ver. A) can be identified by the Atlasia crest, and the phrase "Through the Looking-Glass, Black Light transparently", both present in the logo.

Melty Blood Act Cadenza, released for the PlayStation 2, was unique as a port in that it included an option to revert to Version A mechanics, yet introduced significant changes that were later included in Ver. B, including an early version of Neco-Arc Chaos as a hidden character. It is sometimes known as "Ver. A2".

Melty Blood Act Cadenza Ver. B is an arcade port of the PS2 game with various changes and upgrades, the most notable of which is the inclusion of White Len as a playable character, with a significantly weakened moveset. It also introduced a fifth button that served as a contextual action depending on the situation and the direction held on the joystick when pressed, such as dodging or throwing. This version can be identified by a dual silhouette of Len and White Len in the logo and the phrase "Through the Looking-Glass, Northern Light transparently".

Melty Blood Act Cadenza Ver. B2 is a Windows port of the arcade Ver. B. It has added features including tag-team mode, a 4-player team battle mode, a programmable dummy for training purposes, and a new hidden boss character, Neco-Arc Chaos Black G666 (replacing G-Akiha from Melty Blood Re-ACT). It also included subtle gameplay changes, most notably altered defense ratings for characters and adjustments to the game's input system. It was released on July 27, 2007.

==== Melty Blood Actress Again ====
Melty Blood Actress Again is the fourth game in the Melty Blood fighting game series. It was released on September 19, 2008, in Japan for the Sega Naomi hardware. Compared to Act Cadenza, the game features three entirely new playable characters, as well as several new alternate versions of existing characters in the PS2 version. All characters now feature selection between three different fighting styles, known as Full Moon, Crescent Moon (most similar to Act Cadenza) and Half Moon, which change not only the way in which the life and Magic Circuit meters function, but also each character's basic and special attacks. Actress Again was first announced in the December 2007 issue of the Japanese arcade game magazine Monthly Arcadia, published by Enterbrain. Additional new artwork and a description of the three styles were introduced in the January 2008 issue of Tougeki Damashii magazine. Also in early 2008, Ecole launched the official Actress Again website. Actress Again was released for the PS2 in Japan on August 20, 2009.

==== Melty Blood Actress Again Current Code ====
Melty Blood Actress Again Current Code is an arcade port of the PS2 version. The game underwent location testing in Akihabara from December 19–20, 2009. The characters formerly exclusive to the PS2 version of Actress Again became available for use, and the game runs on Sega's RingWide arcade system, as opposed to NAOMI like Act Cadenza and the original Actress Again. The game's website was launched on February 11, 2010, and after being unveiled officially at Japan's Arcade Operators Union show on February 20, 2010, the game began undergoing another two-week round of location testing. Unverified reports stated that the price for the game and RingWide hardware would be ¥230,000 plus ¥100,000 for a RingWide Harness and shipping costs, equaling US$3,560.83 at exchange rates as of May 13, 2010. Several arcade machine distributors showed the game as being pegged for a release on July 29, 2010.

An upgrade for Melty Blood Actress Again Current Code was launched on May 18, 2011, branded as Melty Blood Actress Again Current Code Ver. 1.05, with new changes in gameplay and adding 2 new playable characters, including Powerd Ciel (Ciel's Executioner version from Melty Blood Re-ACT) with her own Story Mode and ending, along with new moves and sprites for her.

Actress Again Current Code being played at a tournament at James Madison University in 2026.

A final upgrade for Melty Blood Actress Again Current Code was launched on October 14, 2011, named Melty Blood Actress Again Current Code Ver. 1.07. It includes a complete version of Archetype:Earth (princess version of Arcueid Brunestud) with new sprites and moves, and her Story Mode and ending. Also added were Story Modes and endings for the Neco & Mech and Kohaku & Mech teams. Riesbyfe Stridberg (just as Neco-Arc in the PlayStation 2 version of the game) can gain a new route in Story Mode, showing her as living her new life with Sion Eltnam Atlasia and Satsuki Yumizuka as a member of the Back-Alley Alliance (after the endings of Sion and Satsuki).

Melty Blood Actress Again Current Code was released for Windows on December 30, 2011, along with the Blu-ray release of Carnival Phantasm Season 3 limited edition. It included an online multiplayer option and an online matching mode. The matching server was taken down on October 10, 2014; however, direct connection is still available. Four patches have been released, the latest one bringing the game to version 1.4.0. This version was made available on Steam, published by Arc System Works on April 19, 2016, and is the first in the series to introduce English language without modifications.

=== Remake timeline ===
==== Melty Blood: Type Lumina ====
Melty Blood: Type Lumina is the fifth game in the series. It also serves as the first installment of Melty Blood remake timeline series, which itself takes place in the new continuity established by Tsukihime -A piece of blue glass moon-, the first entry of the Tsukihime remake series, as well as direct prequel Witch on the Holy Night. As such, it shares the remake's modernized setting, revised designs, exclusive characters, and story changes. The visuals and mechanics of the game were also redone from the ground up. It was released worldwide on PlayStation 4, Xbox One, Nintendo Switch and Microsoft Windows on September 30, 2021.

==== Melty Blood: Twi-Lumina ====
Melty Blood: Twi-Lumina is the sixth game in the series overall and the second entry of the Melty Blood remake entry which depicted in Tsukihime remake series. It serves as a remake equivalent to a fan-disc game spin-off of Tsukihime series, Kagetsu Tohya in which a character Len serve as its main heroine. This game also improves the gameplay from Type-Lumina. It is set to be released worldwide on April 22, 2027, for PlayStation 5 and Nintendo Switch 2, other than PlayStation 4, Xbox One, Microsoft Windows and Nintendo Switch.

== Reception ==
Reception

Aggregate score
Aggregator	Score
Metacritic	Actress Again Current Code: 78/100

Review score
Publication	Score
Destructoid	80%

Destructoid concluded their review with "Nearly 14 years after first bursting onto the scene, Melty Blood has aged to the point of near-perfection. While a few aspects of the package leave something to be desired, the fact remains that, at its core, this is a supreme fighter with a diverse roster and deep, compelling mechanics that merit your attention."

Melty Blood Act Cadenza has been featured at the international fighting game tournament Tougeki in 2006, 2007, and 2008, but was not present at the 2009 Tougeki. Melty Blood Actress Again was featured at the Evolution Championship Series 2010 tournament after winning a poll, beating titles such as Street Fighter III: 3rd Strike.
