= BlazBlue: Central Fiction =

2015 video game

- Developer: Arc System Works
- Publishers: JP: Arc System Works; NA: Aksys Games; EU: PQube
- Director: Tatsunori Ishikawa
- Producer: Toshimichi Mori
- Designers: Kyouhei Kato; Masanari Ara; Riku Ozawa
- Programmer: Yuki Kawakami
- Artists: Yuuki Katou; Mayumi Tsusaki
- Composers: Daisuke Ishiwatari; Norichika Sato
- Series: BlazBlue
- Platforms: Arcade; PlayStation 3; PlayStation 4; Windows; Nintendo Switch; PlayStation 5
- Release: Arcade: JP: November 19, 2015; PS3, PS4: JP: October 6, 2016; NA: November 1, 2016; EU: November 4, 2016; Windows: WW: April 26, 2017; Nintendo Switch: JP/NA: February 7, 2019; EU: February 8, 2019
- Genres: Fighting, Visual novel
- Modes: Single-player, multiplayer

BlazBlue: Central Fiction is a 2D fighting game developed and published by Arc System Works. It is the final game of the main series and the only game not to have an English dub due to Arc System Works's then financial problems.

== Gameplay ==
Following the gameplay from Chrono Phantasma Extend, there are additional changes and new mechanics. The Overdrive activation's duration is now shown under the Burst Gauge in the form of a countdown timer (which counts seconds and split-seconds); The character portrait near the health bar shakes when taking damage; and each character's emblem appears on their side when the phrase "The Wheel of Fate is Turning" shows at the start of the first Rebel.

The new gameplay mechanics are: Exceed Accel, a special type of Distortion Drive, which is executed a same input as Overdrive activation by holding it during Overdrive activation, or pressing it, begins with the character performing a specific attack in their move-set, and once it connects the rest of the background shatters away into the Overdrive background effect when the attack is performed. It dishes large damage, but immediately ends Overdrive; and Active Flow, which acts as the opposite of Negative Penalty status. A character that fights offensively goes into an Active Flow, which boosts damage and recovery of the Burst Gauge. Active Flow also increases the damage of Exceed Accel (for some it may add extra effects and animations). When a character enters Active Flow, his/her emblem on the health bar becomes purple pink. The purple pink color itself is also shown surrounding the Overdrive Gauge, when a character is close to entering Active Flow. A character can only enter Active Flow once per round.

The story mode for Central Fiction runs around forty hours, with extra arcade mode stories separated into three acts.

== Plot ==
Following the destruction of Take-Mikazuki, the population of the world who does not possess a Drive has been killed. Noel gets a vision of a gate and the whole cast gets sucked into the Embryo, a pocket dimension forming a cage around Amaterasu.

Ragna awakens with amnesia in a world with an altered past, where he relives the plot of Calamity Trigger. However, instead of fighting Nu he offers to save her. Nine the Phantom interrupts and mocks him. She tells everyone that the only way to realize their Dreams is to defeat Izanami.

The cast slowly remembers the world outside the Embryo. The cast each defeat Izanami and see a glimpse of their Dream before the event is undone. When Ragna, who doesn’t have a Dream, fights Izanami, she reveals she is the Drive of Amaterasu. Inside Amaterasu is a young girl, and the world is controlled by her dream - her CentralFiction, which has been overwriting everyone else’s. Izanami and an unaware Noel are two halves of the physical manifestation of this girl. Amaterasu undoes the event with phenomenon intervention.

Izanami announces that whoever kills Noel will have their dreams come true. Ragna uses his Drive to take everyone’s dreams. Kokonoe learns that Nine is initiating phenomenon interventions and sets up a team with Ragna, Jin, Noel, Celica, Minerva, and Jubei to break into her lab. Nine finds them and reveals her replacement for Amaterasu, Requiem, and how the apocalypse really started:

Human scientists discovered god was a machine and thought they could control it, so they created human-like Prime Field Devices to survive the Boundary to communicate with it. The first, the Contact Unit, was granted Azure by Amaterasu, scaring the humans into waging a war. They cast that unit into the Boundary, where she made contact with Amaterasu again. Humanity then created a superweapon, the Black Beast, but it resulted in the end of the world. However, the Contact Unit wished for a “human world” and rewound time until humanity had a fighting chance, the Six Heroes. Upon returning from being thrown into the Boundary, Nine was angered to learn the world was controlled by the whims of a child and swore to kill her.

Ragna kills Nine, breaking Requiem. In her final act, Nine traps Izanami in a time freeze, delaying the end of the world. Celica heals Rachel enough to teleport everyone away, and dies soon after. The team finds themselves in the church, mysteriously intact. Noel learns of her connection with Izanami.

Ragna and Noel fight Izanami and instead of killing her, Noel absorbs her. However, Terumi kills Hakumen and reclaims his body, revealing himself as the god Susano’o who hates Amaterasu and abandoned his body so he wouldn’t have to play by her rules. Susano’o kidnaps Noel and uses her to find the Azure Gate. Ragna follows him and fights Susano’o before Jin kills them both. They wake up on the other side of the Azure Gate and fight until Ragna kills Terumi. Ragna takes the Azure, the power to turn possibility into reality.

Noel absorbs the Contact Unit, releasing the world from her dream. Ragna releases everyone’s dreams into Amaterasu, creating a world where anyone’s dream is possible. Ragna demands that Amaterasu erase him from existence, depriving the world of a way to reset. The ending shows everyone going on to their new lives. Rachel stares at Ragna’s sword, not sure whose it is, but vowing to find its owner. A post credits scene shows the sword missing.

== Characters ==
All twenty eight characters from Chrono Phantasma Extend return in Central Fiction. The additions throughout the game's arcade and console releases bring the roster to thirty seven characters.

Introduced with arcade release

- Hibiki Kohaku: Kagura's secretary and personal assassin. Born into a line of assassins serving the Mutsuki household.
- Naoto Kurogane: The main character of Bloodedge Experience. He is an outsider of the parallel world who searches for a girl called Raquel Alucard.
- Nine the Phantom: Originally one of the Six Heroes. Possessing an exceptional intellect and extraordinary magical power, she is the creator of the "Nox Nyctores" and "Ars Magus." In 2200 A.D., she works with the Imperator.
- Hades Izanami: The former Imperator, highest ranking political official and commander of the Novus Orbis Librarium. In reality, she is the Drive of The Origin. Her goal, to bring upon the day of reckoning, and destroy everything from the world.

Introduced with console release

- Es: One of the main characters of the XBlaze spinoff series. Also known as Embryo Storage. She is the gatekeeper observing the proxy that conveys the will of the Azure.
- Mai Natsume: The main character of the manga series, Remix Heart and Variable Heart. She is the heir to the Duodecim's Hazuki family and a former student of the Military Academy.
- Susano'o: One of the Six Heroes who defeated the Black Beast once upon a time, as well as Yuuki Terumi's true form. Due to the effect of the Susano'o Unit, his impulse for destruction is unchecked, and he brings atrocities tyrannically.
- Jubei: One of the Six Heroes, Kokonoe's father, and Nine's husband. A beastkin warrior who fights with a sword and his razor-sharp claws. He believes in duty and humanity, and has a strong sense of justice. He was released in Japan and North America on August 31, 2017, and in Europe on September 4, 2017.
- Trinity Glassfille: Known as the Platinum Alchemist, one of the Six Heroes previously seen as a non-playable character in the past games.

== Release ==
The game was released for the arcades on November 19, 2015, with a location test having been done in mid-July of that year. A console version was released in Japan on October 6, 2016, in North America on November 1, 2016, and in Europe on November 4, 2016, for the PlayStation 3 and PlayStation 4. Aksys Games has confirmed a limited edition for North American markets which includes a soundtrack disc, a nendoroid figure and a hardcover art book.

A Steam port was released on April 26, 2017.

A Nintendo Switch release called BlazBlue: Centralfiction - Special Edition was released digitally on February 7, 2019, on Nintendo's eShop. It was also released physically in Europe and in Japan, but not in North America besides a limited release by Limited Run Games in 2022. This version has every character (including the PlayStation console added characters) and the DLC character, Jubei.

At CEO 2021, it was revealed that the Steam version of the game will be patched with rollback netcode in 2022. The rollback netcode for the Steam version was officially released on February 1, 2022.

In June 2026, Riku Ozawa announced during the Arc System Works Showcase the game would add a new playable character. During Evo 2026, the character was announced to be Trinity Glassfille.

== Reception ==
Reception

Aggregate score
Aggregator	Score
Metacritic	PS4: 84/100; NS: 86/100

Review scores
Publication	Score
Destructoid	8.5/10
Eurogamer	9/10
Famitsu	34/40
Nintendo Life	9/10
Nintendo World Report	8.5/10
Pocket Gamer	4/5

In Japan, BlazBlue: Central Fiction sold 26,506 copies on PS4 and 9,674 copies on PS3. Aggregate reviewer Metacritic gave the game an 84 out of 100 citing generally positive reviews from websites. Famitsu gave the game a 34/40 for the PlayStation 3 and PlayStation 4 versions. Chris Carter of Destructoid gave the title an 8.5/10 while complimenting the impressive amount of effort with few problems for a niche game. Filippo Facchetti of Eurogamer gave a score 9 out of 10 for Central Fiction, recommending players who love fighting games and anime to buy the title.
