= NESiCAxLive =

Digital distribution system for arcade video games

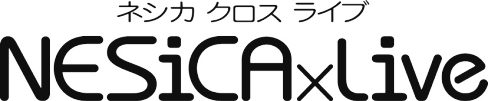
- Developer: Taito
- Type: Arcade video game network system
- Launched: JP: 2010; US: 2015
- Platform: Arcade video game
- Status: Active

NESiCAxLive (Japanese: ネシカ クロス ライブ, Hepburn: Neshika Kurosu Raibu) is a digital distribution system for arcade video games developed by Taito. It is similar to the SEGA ALL.Net game distribution system. Taito uses NESiCAxLive to distribute not only its own games, but also allows other companies to use it as a publication platform. On its introduction SNK, Cave, and Arc System Works had agreed to distribute games on NESiCAxLive. Currently, 8 games are operated as alone running titles and 29 titles as downloadable titles on candy cabinets.

== History ==
The system was first revealed in September 2010 at the 48th Amusement Machine Show in Chiba, Japan, as the Taito Vewlix NESiCA arcade cabinet, and was launched on 9 December 2010. The first game to be released for the system was Arc System Works' BlazBlue: Continuum Shift II. Taito introduced the NESiCAxLive 2 system in June 2017.

== System ==
The NESiCAxLive system consists of an arcade system board combined with a dedicated router to access and download games. The system currently works on the Taito Type X2, Taito Type X Zero, Taito Type X3, and Taito Type X4 arcade boards. The connected machines access the Taito NESYS online network to allow arcade operators to download games from Taito's servers directly to the arcade cabinet; previously arcade operators had to purchase new game boards (as well as dispose of old ones) to run a new game. Games can also be downloaded to a local server to allow quicker distribution to machines, as well as allow rapid swapping in and out of games according to player demand. Taito allows arcade operators to download games free, as part of a revenue sharing system, with income split with Taito and the game developer. The original NESiCAxLive system was initially exclusive to Japan, but was later made available at Round 1 arcades in the United States beginning in 2015.

Taito introduced the NESiCAxLive 2 platform in June 2017. The upgraded system allows player versus player competition between machines in different locations, as well having improved CPU and GPU performance.

== NESiCAxLive games ==
(★ marked with dedicated software delivery NESiCAxLive)

- 3D Cosplay Mahjong (2013) ★
- Akai Katana Shin for NESiCAxLive (2012) ★
- Aquapazza: Aquaplus Dream Match (2011) ★
- Arcana Heart 2 for NESiCAxLive (2012) ★
- Arcana Heart 3 Love Max!!!!! (2013) ★
- Arcana Heart 3 Love Max Six Stars!!!!!! (2014) ★
- Battle Fantasia Network Edition for NESiCAxLive (2011) ★
- BlazBlue: Central Fiction (2015) ★
- BlazBlue: Chronophantasma (2012) ★
- BlazBlue: Continuum Shift II (2010) ★
- Chaos Breaker for NESiCAxLive (2012) ★
- Chaos Code: New Sign of Catastrophe (2013) ★
- Crimzon Clover for NESiCAxLive (2013) ★
- Daemon Bride - Additional Gain (2011) ★
- Dark Awake for NESiCAxLive (2012) ★
- Do Not Fall (2013) ★
- Dragon Dance for NESiCAxLive (2011) ★
- Elevator Action for NESiCAxLive (2014) ★
- EN-Eins Perfektewelt for NESiCAxLive (2012) ★
- EN-Eins Perfektewelt Anastasis (2023) ★
- Exception for NESiCAxLive (2011) ★
- Gouketsuji Ichizoku: Matsuri Senzo Kuyou for NESiCAxLive (2012) ★
- Homura for NESiCAxLive (2012) ★
- Hyper Street Fighter II: The Anniversary Edition for NESiCAxLive (2014) ★
- Ikaruga for NESiCAxLive (2013) ★
- Magical Beat (2012) ★
- Nitroplus Blasterz: Heroines Infinite Duel (2015) ★
- Persona 4: The Ultimate in Mayonaka Arena (2012) ★
- Persona 4: The Ultimax Ultra Suplex Hold (2013) ★
- Psychic Force 2012 for NESiCAxLive (2012) ★
- Puzzle Bobble for NESiCAxLive (2012) ★
- Raiden III for NESiCAxLive (2012) ★
- Raiden IV for NESiCAxLive (2012) ★
- Rastan Saga for NESiCAxLive (2014) ★
- Samurai Spirits Sen for NESiCAxLive (2011) ★
- Senko No Ronde Duo - Dis-United Order for NESiCAxLive (2011) ★
- Skullgirls 2nd Encore (2015) ★
- Space Invaders for NESiCAxLive (2012) ★
- Spica Adventure for NESiCAxLive (2011) ★
- Strania -The Stella Machina- (2011) ★
- Street Fighter III 3rd Strike: Fight for the Future for NESiCAxLive (2014) ★
- Street Fighter Zero 3 for NESiCAxLive (2014) ★
- Suggoi! Arcana Heart 2 for NESiCAxLive (2012) ★
- The King of Fighters '98 Ultimate Match Final Edition for NESiCAxLive (2011) ★
- The King of Fighters 2002 Unlimited Match for NESiCAxLive (2011) ★
- The King of Fighters XIII Climax for NESiCAxLive (2013) ★
- The pieces Naimmentanpin-Doradorara~tsu miss! (2014) ★
- The Rumble Fish 2 for NESiCAxLive (2012) ★
- Tottemo E-Mahjong (2013) ★
- Trouble Witches AC for NESiCAxLive (2012) ★
- Ultra Street Fighter IV (2014) ★
- Vampire Savior for NESiCAxLive (2014) ★
- Yatagarasu: Attack on Cataclysm (2015) ★
- Yatagarasu: Enter the Eastward (2024) ★

== NESiCAxLive2 games ==
(★ marked with dedicated software delivery NESiCAxLive2)

- BlazBlue: Central Fiction for NESiCAxLive2 (2017) ★
- BlazBlue: Cross Tag Battle (2019) ★
- Fighting EX Layer (2018) ★
- The King of Fighters XIV Arcade Ver. (2017) ★
- Million Arthur: Arcana Blood (2017) ★
- Omen of Sorrow (2022) ★
- Samurai Shodown (2019) ★
- Levels VS Addictive Puzzle Game (2020) ★
- SNK Heroines AC: Tag Team Frenzy (2018) ★
- Street Fighter V: Type Arcade (2019) ★
- Street Fighter 6: Type Arcade (2023) ★

== See also ==
- Digital distribution in video games
- Taito Type X
- Taito NESYS
