= Akatsuki Blitzkampf =

Akatsuki EN-Eins
- Genre: Fighting
- Developer: Subtle Style
- Publishers: Subtle Style, PIC, Rutobu Games Work, NESiCAxLive
- Platforms: Arcade (Sega NAOMI, NESiCAxLive), Microsoft Windows
- First release: Akatsuki Shisei Ichigō; November 2003
- Latest release: EN-Eins Perfektewelt Anastasis; February 21, 2023

Akatsuki EN-Eins (アカツキ/エンアイン, Akatsuki EN-Ain) is a series of Japanese dōjin 2D fighting games, developed by the dōjin circle SUBTLE STYLE for Microsoft Windows and arcades. It takes place in an alternate 21 century in the year 200X - 20XX, but with a World War II era aesthetic.

== Games ==
=== Akatsuki ===
The initial game in the series had three major revisions: Akatsuki Shisei Ichigō, Akatsuki Blitzkampf, and Akatsuki Blitzkampf Ausf. Achse.

Akatsuki Shisei Ichigō
- Developer: Subtle Style
- Publisher: Subtle Style
- Platform: Microsoft Windows
- Release: JP: November 2003
- Genre: Fighting
- Modes: Single-player, multiplayer

Akatsuki Shisei Ichigō (アカツキ試製一號, lit. Akatsuki Prototyp 1; Akatsuki Prototyp 1) is the first installment of the series, which was released in November 2003 for Microsoft Windows. As the game itself has no storyline, it is a prototype version of Akatsuki Blitzkampf, below.

Akatsuki Blitzkampf
- Box art of the game
- Developer: Subtle Style
- Publisher: Subtle Style
- Platform: Microsoft Windows
- Release: JP: April 30, 2007
- Genre: Fighting
- Modes: Single-player, multiplayer

Akatsuki Blitzkampf (アカツキ電光戦記, Akatsuki Denkō Senki; Akatsuki Flash Fight) is a full version of Akatsuki Shisei Ichigō for Microsoft Windows, including additional characters, game modes and online play.

Akatsuki Blitzkampf Ausf. Achse
- Promotional art of the game
- Developer: Subtle Style
- Publisher: PIC
- Platforms: Arcade (Sega NAOMI); Microsoft Windows
- Release: Arcade: JP: February 20, 2008; Microsoft Windows: WW: TBA
- Genre: Fighting
- Modes: Single-player, multiplayer

Akatsuki Blitzkampf Ausf. Achse (アカツキ電光戦記 Ausf. Achse, Akatsuki Denkō Senki Ausf. Achse; Akatsuki Flash Fight Axis Edition) is the final standalone revision of the first game for arcade and Microsoft Windows. After finding success on the Dōjin soft scene, on September 27, 2007, Monthly Arcadia magazine confirmed that the game would be launched as an arcade title, with the provisional name "Akatsuki Blitzkampf AC", published by SUBTLE STYLE itself. The first location test was held on November 23, 2007, at High Tech Land Sega AViON in Japan. It features improved graphical enhancements and re-introduces a new character known as Perfecti (Kanzensha in Japan), who was originally a mere alternate version/palette swap of Mycale in the original Blitzkampf. The final release of Ausf. Achse was in Japanese arcades on February 20, 2008, for the Sega NAOMI system and published with the help of PIC company. Although Ausf. Achse being announced on March 29, 2019, to have a Microsoft Windows port, under the name Akatsuki Blitzkampf Type-A (アカツキ電光戦記 A式, Akatsuki Denkō Senki A-Shiki; Akatsuki Flash Fight Type-A), the COVID-19 pandemic cause the release date and development to be delayed.

It is a common misconception that the subtitle is a misspelling of the German phrase "Auf Achse," meaning "on tour/on the road/on the move". In fact, the term "Ausf." is short for "Ausführung" and has been very common in historic German military nomenclature, meaning "option model" or "version". Therefore, "Ausf. Achse" literally means "option model with axle(s)" or "moveable/mobile/non-stationary version". "Achse" also translates to "axis", and given the game's militaristic style, a very probable translation is "Akatsuki Flash Fight Axis Edition".

=== EN-Eins ===
The sequel to the first game and its updates has itself had two revisions: EN-Eins Perfektewelt and EN-Eins Perfektewelt Anastasis.

EN-Eins Perfektewelt
- Developers: Subtle Style; Rutubo Game Works
- Publisher: Subtle Style
- Engine: Zou Engine
- Platform: Arcade
- Release: JP: June 25, 2010; JP: February 22, 2012; (NESiCAxLive)
- Genre: Fighting
- Modes: Single-player, multiplayer

EN-Eins Perfektewelt (エヌアイン完全世界, EN-Ain Kanzen Sekai; EN-Eins Perfect World) is a sequel to Akatsuki Blitzkampf Ausf. Achse, co-developed between Subtle Style and Rutubo Game Works and released in arcades. It was released on the System Board Y2 arcade system on June 25, 2010. The game was later ported to the Taito Type X² arcade board and released digitally via NESiCAxLive on February 22, 2012.

The subtitle comes from the German phrase "Perfekte Welt," meaning "Perfect World", referring to the new titular protagonist EN-Eins, the last surviving clone of his cloning batch who aims to defeat one of Knights Templar’s leaders, such as Valkyria (a boss version of her playable clone, Tempelritter) for the sake of creating a perfect world. The game also re-introduces Mycale's replacement and former host, Kati as a playable character, as well introducing Anonym-Guard as a replacement for Anonym Merel Lambuth.

EN-Eins Perfektewelt Anastasis
- Developer: Subtle Style
- Publisher: Subtle Style
- Engine: Zou Engine
- Platform: Arcade
- Release: Arcade: JP: February 21, 2023; (First launch): JP: 2025; (Full version)
- Genre: Fighting
- Modes: Single-player, multiplayer
- Arcade system: NESiCAxLive

EN-Eins Perfektewelt Anastasis (エヌアイン完全世界 ANASTASIS, EN-Ain Kanzen Sekai Anastasia; EN-Eins Perfect World Rebirth) is an updated version of the sequel game, developed and published by Subtle Style. It was first released on NESiCAxLive arcade digital for the game's NESiCAxLive port's 10th-anniversary debut and to celebrate NESiCAxLive's 12th anniversary.

The subtitle comes from the Greek word "Anastasis," meaning "rebirth", which also represents Subtle Style's return to game development since the series appeared in certain games crossed over. As the series' creator Subtle confirm that the original release was in fact in the beta stage, this update, being an actual finalized version of the original release, not only adds completely re-worked artwork, UI, and an arcade storyline, it re-introduces Mycale in the body of Anonym Merel Lambuth which she stole at the end of the previous game and a playable version of Valkyria, as well as introduces a new character who is a motorcyclist Blitzsoldier known by the name Inazuma. Apart from the new version of Mycale and playable Valkyria, 2 unknown brand new characters (a second new playable character and the true final boss (planned to be initially non-playable) were part of the crowdfunding however, the two latter's inclusions did not meet the funding's stretch goal for its full release plan by the time the funding ends.

The crowdfunding held by Subtle Style and its sponsored arcade center KO-HATSU for the new contents within Anastasis first started on April 26, 2022, until June 5, 2022. Game Center Will opened a tournament charity event of original EN-Eins Perfektewelt on May 29, 2022, to support the crowdfunding before the end of the funding date.

At the same time the official website opened on November 11, 2022, the location test was only for November 25 until 27, 2022 at the arcade centers Ko-Hatsu (Osaka), Game Center Will (Tokyo), Maxim Hero (Hokkaido), and Fantasista (Okayama) prefecture, before its initial launch. Originally, the game’s initial release was meant to be released at the end of 2022. However, on December 5, 2022, Ko-Hatsu and Subtle Style confirmed that the release date would be delayed to around 2023, in order to fix various gameplay issues based on the location test’s data. Following its wide arcade release in late February 2023, a proper full version of the game which includes crowdfunded playable characters and finalized contents is in the works, with the release date having yet to be revealed. Between the initial release and full release, each crowdfunded playables are added on December each years.

== Gameplay ==
The game's playstyle is regarded as relatively "old school" in comparison to many other dōjin fighter releases such as Melty Blood, Eternal Fighter Zero, or Big Bang Beat, as many of the systems and conventions in the game are rather similar to several late 1990s fighting games made by companies such as Capcom. The game is slower-paced and focuses more on careful footwork and space control than the aforementioned games. The extra modes the game provides and the ways in which they are unlocked also resemble console releases of old fighting games, further reinforcing the retro feel. A signature feature of the series is the Reflector (攻性防禦, Hōsebōgyo; Assault Protection), a reversal-parry move that allows players to guard against incoming attacks without taking chip damages or cost guard gauge, and can only counterattack into Interceptor (要撃攻性防禦, Yōgeki Hōsebōgyo; Interception Assault Protection) at close range, whether on the ground (both standing or crouching) or in the air.

In EN-Eins, the Reflector button (B+C) can also be assigned to the D button for beginner-friendly use. When activating a burst-like move known as Perfektewelt by pressing A+B+D, the game will grant the player increased boosts, such as health regeneration, at the cost of no longer being able to use EX or regular Super moves once this state has been entered. Once the gauge limit of Perfektewelt depletes, players cannot use EX or regular Supers until the regular gauge returns to being usable in the following round(s). While in the Perfektewelt state before reaching the gauge limit, players can press A+B+D again to perform an Instant Kill-like attack while in close proximity, the "Perfekte Finish". EN-Eins also introduces a double jump-like air dashes, auto combos, and dash attacks.

The co-op-based modes does not appear in Akatsuki Blitzkampf Ausf. Achse's arcade version and the original EN-Eins Perfektewelt, with the former’s said port because of its arcade board game space limitations, while the latter was a beta like Akatsuki Shisei Ichigo. While the original Akatsuki Blitzkampf has both 2-on-2-based Team Battle Versus and a non-canonical Arcade mode which can be played by 1 - 4 players, the full version release of EN-Eins Perfektewelt Anastasis only has 2-on-1-based Dramatic Battle like in the Street Fighter series, but it follows the storyline of the first player who starts playing the game.

== Synopsis ==
Akatsuki EN-Eins is set in an alternate Japanese Imperial year, Koki 266X A.D. (200X AD in a Gregorian year) up to 20XX AD, involving several characters that resemble the Nazis and soldiers of the World War II era and a bit from both Mediterranean and Scandinavian myths, among others. In-game visuals supplement this sort of specific militaristic theme and environment, portrayed by the flat and somewhat cubist character portraits and story sequence images. Akatsuki Blitzkampf (Ausf. Achse) is also the finalized version of its 2003 beta title Akatsuki Shisei Ichigō, involving many characters from the game. The series’ plot heavily focuses on unearthing ancient surroundings (mainly sourced from a hollowed Earth located at Agartha beneath Tibet and a fictional Neuland beneath Antarctica), reincarnations, cloning and godhood.

In 195X, Imperial Army high-class technical engineer Akatsuki is transporting a new weapon, the "Blitz Motor", from Germany to Japan, when his submarine is damaged. Akatsuki is able to survive by using a Hibernation Unit to remain frozen in the submarine for 50 years. Later, in 200X AD, the submarine suddenly emerges in the Arctic Ocean. Akatsuki begins to carry out his final orders received during the war, which were to destroy the Blitz Motor to prevent it falling into enemy hands. However, various organizations begin to search for Akatsuki in order to gain the power of the Blitz Motor for themselves.

EN-Eins storyline takes place around ten years after Murakumo's defeat at the hands of Akatsuki. In 20XX AD, there was a small report of a collapse accident in the undeveloped Tibetan Tsampo Canyon. With Murakumo's fall from leadership, this allows the ancient witch Mycale and her partner, the battle maiden Valkyria an opportunity to take over "Gesellschaft" (German for "society") assets. A few months later, the world's chaos starts due to the simultaneous global terrorist attack by an organization claiming to be the "Neu Tempera Orden" (German for "New Orders of Knights Templar"), the one secretly leading and end up revealing themselves as the organization's originator under the front name "Perfecti Cult". Taking on this chaos, a dark fight for the hegemony of the new world begins.

== Characters ==
=== Introduced in Akatsuki Shisei Ichigō ===
- Akatsuki (アカツキ)

Voiced by: Shinobu Matsumoto (Note: Credited as Souji Hijikata prior to Ausf. Achse onward) (Japanese); Kaiji Tang (Cross Tag Battle). (English)
High-class technical officer of the Imperial army and one of the former Gesellschaft members. Believed to have died in the Arctic oceans at a critical time after the war came to an end, during the transportation of a new military unit from an allied country. Fifty years later, he returns alive and unchanged in appearance. Now wielding superhuman abilities powered by the original prototype Blitz Motor, he resumes his mission. He soon learns that his last mission during an imperial day was set up by his superior, Murakumo to have himself supposedly killed, but the plan fails as Akatsuki survives and awakens fifty years later. As Murakumo is the original Akatsuki before him and Akatsuki was the first successful Blitz Motor super-soldier known as a Blitzsoldier (電光兵(デンコウヘイ), Denkōhei; lit. Lightning Soldier), Akatsuki is referred to by his former superior and the rest like Fritz and even Kanae as "Prototyp 1", with Akatsuki's real name being unknown. After killing Murakumo's original body with the help of Kanae, Marilyn and Wei, Akatsuki is likely indirectly free a young soldier named EN-Eins from his stasis before escaping from Gesellschaft's destruction. He and EN-Eins share a similar reason, destruction of Gesellschaft and its originator, the Tempera Orden. A few years later, while being targeted by the Tempera Orden who are now in possession of the remaining Gesellschaft assets, Akatsuki set to return to Antarctica, believed to be the main source of Blitz technologies in the underground world.
He also appeared in Under Night In-Birth (starting from Exe:Late until Sys:Celes) and BlazBlue: Cross Tag Battle patch 2.0, in which the former game series takes place between his venture at Shanghai and prior to his encounter with both Kanae and Fritz at Fuji during his titular game's storyline, while the latter crossover game takes place after his and EN-Eins's titular games.

- Mycale (ミュカレ, Myukare)

Voiced by: Karumagu (Kati's body), Tokio Fukamachi (Merel's body)
A French witch of falling moon from an ancient time that belongs to a secret religious society called "Neu Tempera Orden" (originally known as an unnamed "Perfecti Cult"); in 1253, they have been manipulating history from behind the scenes and she was planning to wipe out old humanity under "Operation Dynamis" since Middle Age until the Holy Club interfered and had her original body was burned alive in public for her villainy. Thankfully, inspired by Praeses Valkyria's Heilige Lanze, Mycale used the black magic and learned its attributes to link her soul to her weapon Dainsleif, under its sealed marshal wand appearance, and be able to possess a host's body when one of them touches it. She was part of the Gesellschaft alliance during World War II before her host's body from that time was killed by Adler, sometimes after Akatsuki Zero (now Murakumo) sabotaged Akatsuki's submarine in the 1950s. Upon possessing the young Kati in the present, she manipulates her host's parents and is able to avoid Sai's suspicion, in order to further her plans to recover the missing weapons. However, she has to deal with disposing Murakumo over their leadership on leading Gesellschaft, using anyone else's desires, such as Marilyn's ambitions to overthrow Black Hand's leadership from Yin Hu to quickly succeed her plan and obtaining a Blitz Motor from Akatsuki to become a next leader of the triad, then disposing of them as well. Although Mycale is separated from Kati by a Holy Club member Anonym Merel Lambuth, the nun ends up possessed by the witch's soul when she holds the Dainsleif containing the former's soul. While her first "form" is replaced by her spiritual replacement and former host, Kati in the sequel game, EN-Eins Perfektewelt, while her second "form", which possessed Merel's body dubbed Mycale Anastasis (ミュカレ•アナスタシス, Myukare Anastasisu) (or Mycale-A for short, with Japanese text spelled as 'Mycale A.' (ミュカレ•A, Myukare A.)) is playable in the Anastasis update, where the latter was to be added in 1.20 update of Anastasis, replacing Inazuma as a final boss, but without transforming into her Perfecti form after losing a round for a time being.
There were multiple choices between wearing her glasses or not while possessing Merel's body based on the crowdfunding supporters' choice via comments on Ko-Hatsu's Ci-En account in the first fifteen days of September 2022 for her "new form"'s inclusion in Anastasis. Despite the final poll result on September 21, 2022 where Mycale Anastasis would fight with her glasses on in the final release, the first day of October 2022 reveals a version without wearing her glasses will be included as well. However, at time of her release in 1.20 update, due to the game currently have no exact option to switch between with and without glasses versions, and can only add twelve color palettes, it cost Mycale Anastasis to sacrifice her last six color slots for the latter version, and the said version does not inherit the first six color palettes.

- Sai (塞(さい)) (real name: Claude D'Aspremont (クロード・ダスプルモン, Kurōdo Dasupurumon))

Voiced by: Shion Hibiki
An information broker for the Xinhua computer company of Hong Kong, who is, in reality, an English secret agent for MI6, working undercover to investigate the company's connection to Gesellschaft. He through clandestine means gathers information throughout the world. Rumors say that behind his sunglasses lurks mystical evil eyes that can kill a man instantly and somehow made Sai younger and immortal for decades. Sai had a rivalry with Murakumo fifty years ago and their connection is related to Sai's evil eye abilities. Sai happens to be associated with the family of Kati, a young girl who was possessed by Mycale and concerned about her safety for her parents' sake. After Akatsuki, Kanae, Marilyn and Wei kills Murakumo's original body, once Kati freed from Mycale's possession by Anonym Merel, Sai secures her safety and conjures a curse on a Morgenstern as he found at Gesellschaft Base before the base was destroyed, then later gave the weapon to her, under specific condition for her own safety. Unfortunately, to his dismay, Kati ignores his advice from going home.

- Fritz (不律(ふりつ), Furitsu)

Voiced by: Shion Hibiki
A military surgeon dubbed a "Hell's Doctor" who practiced in the Imperial army and was among those who founded Gesellschaft during the war prior to defection fifty years later. During his time with Gesellschaft, he was involved with artificial being projects such as cloning (namely Elektrosoldat) and supposedly defunct cybernization (Blitztank). Albeit becoming unaccounted for afterward, he sets off on eliminating all those who have appeared concurrently with Akatsuki's revival, then investigates the connection between Gesellschaft and its actual originator, the Tempera Orden. He was also remember what happened to his excellency and a prototype clone, Mitford at the beginning World War II. He uses Mugai ryu swordsmanship and a katana Herschel Kotetsu to fight. He may have a prototype Blitz suit as Akatsuki, but does not have a Blitz Motor in it, as evident why he remains aging.
Added in version 1.02.

- Kanae (鼎(かなえ))

Voiced by: Rin Nanishi (Note: Credited as 724)
An intelligence operative, who utilizes a body armored suit to strengthen her entire body. She started out as a lieutenant for the second office of the Ground Staff Overseeing Department in Akatsuki title. With the news of Akatsuki's revival, she is ordered to recover a secret "Blitz Motor", lost at the end of the war, but was ordered to retreat afterward. Unaware to Kanae, her boss, Major Senke is one of Murakumo's clones and somehow disappeared by the time Kanae was discharged from G.S.O.D and recruited by Cabinet Intelligence and Research Office at the same time as Mycale's Neu Tempera Orden has all Gesellschaft's assets and declares war on humanity alongside Valkyria, causing Kanae to find his current whereabout and who Senke truly is. Thanks to CIRO's intelligence, Kanae is able to discover all official governments which Murakumo and Mycale compromised, then backed by eradication troops to find and eradicate them all.
Added in version 1.03.

=== Introduced in Akatsuki Blitzkampf ===
- Marilyn Sue Dajie (マリリン・スー・大姐(ター・チェ), Marilin Sū Tā Che)

Voiced by: Karumagu
An assassin for the continent's largest international mafia "Black Hand" and a master of assassination techniques using Piguaquan. She was born to a farmer family in a rural village at Hebei, China, but unfortunately she was considered a Heihaizi conceived outside from One-child policy, until an Old Farmer adopted her for 100 yuan, and revealing his past history to her and teach her master arts of Piguaquan. She began to help his farm work, in order to work out her body, and earns enough money to buy "iron sandbag", filled with iron grains and mung beans to train. Being left orphan again after Old Farmer passes away, find jobs in the Shanghai's springs for her survival and likely to find a way to honor her adoptive grandfather's wish, she applied for Mizu shōbai and it was very profitable. But one fateful night, she was being accused for touching customer's money during her job. When she nearly killed the customer and hostess, she was running soaked and wet in the rain to alleyway. However, one of the members of Black Hand found and captured her, yet immediately welcomed and respected by its leader, Yin Hu for her lethal skills. She was one of top rank assassins and future candidates for leaders to lead Black Hand along with her fellow member, Wei. She was told by Mycale (during her time possessing Kati's body) to murder her boss, Yin Hu as the first request. By plundering the Blitz Motor from Akatsuki, she aims to rise in influence and power. In reality, she was also told by Mycale (as a messenger) to either defeat or kill Akatsuki then take his Blitz Motor from him to take control of the mafia. Until she learned both Mycale and Gesellschaft deceived her, and Yin Hu was the one of Murakumo's clones. Nevertheless, despite failing to defeat Akatsuki then take his Blitz Motor under Mycale's second request, she along with Kanae and Wei helps Akatsuki to defeat Murakumo. After that, she use big amounts of money to bribe the mafia's higher-up and succeeds taking over Black Hand. By the time Mycale got the Gesellschaft's assets to the Tempera Orden and declares war on humanity alongside Valkyria a few years later, Marilyn enters the war and aid the allied resistance, just to purposely attempt to become the savior of the world in her quest.

- Dawei Ye Lue (大魏也略(ダー・ウェイ・イェ・ルウ), Tā Wei Ye Rū)

Voiced by: Shinobu Matsumoto
A cold-blooded, yet honorable assassin and master of Xingyi Quan, who rose up to the ranks of Black Hand's leaders. After his patron, Yin Hu was assassinated, Wei searches for the criminal. After finding out that his boss, Yin Hu was one of the clones of Murakumo, he along Kanae and Marilyn helps Akatsuki to defeat Murakumo. After that, he has the list of the clones that infiltrated the organization and the political world, then fake his death for a time being to train himself at a mountain in preparing to kill all Murakumo clones. By the time the Tempera Orden has Gesellschaft's assets and declares war on humanity alongside Valkyria, Wei completed his training at the same time he suspects Murakumo will be there as well.

- Anonym Merel Lambuth (アノニム・メレル・ランバス, Anonimu Mereru Ramubasu)

Voiced by: Strange Heke (ABK(AA), Tokio Fukamachi (EN1A onward)
An Armed Inquisitor of Heresy, within a religious society - The Holy Club. She is sent to destroy the headquarters of an organization charged with the heresy of aiding Gesellschaft, the Tempera Orden. Anonym Merel is a master of the Lambuth-style gun technique, a combination of Chinese self-defense and two pairs of pistols, Webley-Fosbery. She is replaced by her superior, Anonym-Guard in the sequel game EN-Eins. While confirming to be the one who she saved Kati from Mycale's possession, it also caused her to end up being the current host of the witch.

- Elektrosoldat (エレクトロゾルダート, Elekutorosorudāto)

Voiced by: Yohei Takino (Note: Credited as Kyosuke Amasaki prior to Ausf. Achse onward)
Private Blitzsoldier army of Gesellschaft, and later Neu Tempera Orden, cloned from Ernst von Adler. Although equipped with the same Blitz Motor as Akatsuki, albeit the latest version known as “Blitzkamp Motor”, the connection between them lies shrouded in mystery. However, one soldier begins to oppose Gesellschaft, while at the same time of ended up dying of an unknown disease caused by the side-effect of Blitz Motor. The second clone who defects the Tempera Orden befriends another defector, EN-Eins, realizing he might be a cure for the Elektrosoldat cloning batch's short lifespan.

- Ernst von Adler (エルンスト・フォン・アドラー, Erunsuto fon Adorā)

Voiced by: Yohei Takino (ABK) (uncredited), Reizi Nagase (ABKAA onward)
While primarily a mad scientist, Adler is also a former officer within the organization "Ahnenerbe", as he did research on German ancestry. He participated in the excavation of Tibet's ancient heritage and founded Gesellschaft together but upon the discovery of the ancient city of Agartha, he uses the science for his own ambitions. He is the originator of the Elektrosoldat clone army. It might be possible that he was involved in helping Murakumo murder Mycale's body prior to her possession of young Kati. At some point, before EN-Eins begin, Adler died and was reincarnated by possessing a powerful and stabled Elektrosoldat's body, proclaiming himself as "Super Adler" and resuming his work with the Tempera Orden.
Added in version 1.1.0 SP Beta.

- Blitztank (Denkōsensha (電光戦車(デンコウセンシャ); lit. Lightning Tank) in Japan)

An electrical tank, powered by a modified Blitz Motor, known as "Perfecti Motor" as its source of power. According to a copy of the document on new engine research labeled "Gesellschaft", a test piece was developed. However, it was revoked along with the plan itself before the full-scale production could take place. In the near climax of Akatsuki storyline, the tanks are revealed to be originally dying soldiers who had been cybernated into living tanks as they are now. Playable Blitztank begins to remember something upon encountering Akatsuki and progressively attempts to rebel against Gesellschaft, while another which used by the Tempera Orden for warfare against humanity is mind-controlled by EN-Eins to help him save it.
It also appeared in BlazBlue: Cross Tag Battle, in which it unusually uses the localized name "Blitztank" even in Japanese.

- Murakumo (ムラクモ) (formerly known as Akatsuki Zero (アカツキ零号))

Voiced by: Shinobu Matsumoto
The final boss of the first game. At the time of the previous war, he was a military officer stationed in Germany who planned actions for an inspection group on military affairs through leading his Akatsuki unit, being both former superior of Akatsuki and ally of Fritz on the unit he led. In this position, he got in touch with Neu Tempera Orden through Mycale, including Ernst von Adler from Ahnenerbe, and established the Military Technique Research facility, nicknamed "Gesellschaft", then discover Agartha and created Blitz Motor. Towards the end of the war, news from Berlin is interrupted, but the "Gesellschaft" remains active. True by his rank, he was the original Akatsuki before the main protagonist himself, as he was a leader of “Akatsuki” unit. Once an honorable man, the discovery of Blitz Motor and the “Perfecti” magical method turned him into a megalomaniac who will do anything to obtain a godhood, which involves sabotages the government and betraying his own allies behind the scenes for fifty years, such as his failed attempt on sabotaging Akatsuki's submarine, having had Adler killed Mycale's previous host to take over Gesellschaft under his rule, and causes Fritz to defect from the organization. The reason he and Mycale having a recent odd each other because of their different views to become an immortal Perfecti, whereas Murakumo wants to rule humanity under his tyrannical rule, while Mycale wants to destroy the old humanity and replace with new ones. Despite his original body was killed by Akatsuki, Kanae, Marilyn and Wei, he revealed to have some of his clones to be used as his vessel to keep him alive, namely Senke (his current host, and Kanae's superior), and Yin Hu (Black Hand's late-leader who was killed by Marilyn sent by Mycale). Aside ruling G.S.O.D and Black Hand behind the scene, Xinhua Computers was also his sub-organization he ruled, until is its infiltrated by his old nemesis, Sai. While in Senke's body at the time Mycale has all Gesellschaft's assets back to Tempera Order, and declare a war alongside Valkyria on humanity, Murakumo remains to manipulate the government systems while trying to get the assets for his own godhood goal back. He was also involved in the creation of Inazuma, before the latter escape, but resurfaced sometimes later when the Tempera Orden wages war on humanity.

=== Introduced in Akatsuki Blitzkampf Ausf. Achse ===
- Perfecti (Kanzensha (完全者(カンゼンシャ); lit. Perfect One) in Japan)

Voiced by: Keiko Utsumi (Note: Credited as Keiko Tani since 2017)
While Perfecti is commonly a moniker of those who sought to achieve a perfect immortality, whether through body possession or reincarnations, the playable Perfecti in this series is an ultimate form of the witch Mycale, equipped with a different type of Blitzkamp Motor than Adler and his Elektrosoldat unit. She can transform her Dainsleif from its sealed marshal wand state into a Devil Blade bayonet. She was originally a mere palette swap of Mycale in Akatsuki Blitzkampf prior to being re-introduced in Ausf. Achse update as her own character and the second round's sub-boss of the said update after defeating Mycale.

=== Introduced in EN-Eins Perfektewelt ===
- EN-Eins (エンアイン, EN-Ain) (full name: Energaia Eins (エネルゲイア・アイン, Enerugeia Ain))

Voiced by: Aina Nishimura (Note: Credited as Aina Yasukuni)
The sole survivor of Gesellschaft's Energaia cloning batch cloned from an unnamed Neuland God, yet inherit the bloodline of another discovered ancient civilization, Neuland. He is presumably indirectly saved by Akatsuki before Gesellschaft is destroyed after Akatsuki killed Murakumo's original body, with EN-Eins already escaped from the base during the said battle. Upon receiving his power by the Gesellschaft's experiments to achieve godhood and destroy the old humanity, EN-Eins becomes an esper, which grant him psychic abilities. EN-Eins also wears two pairs of special gloves ES Kampfhandschuh to not only keep his psychic power in check, but also grant the user a pyrokinesis. EN-Eins aims to stop the evil military organization to avenge his clone "siblings" and save humanity. Unbeknownst to him, he is not the only survivor of his batch.

- Kati (カチィ)

Voiced by: Keiko Utsumi
The former host of Mycale in Akatsuki-title games after the latter possessed the body of the Holy Church member, Anonym Merel Lambuth. As Kati is now freed from Mycale, she becomes her own as a playable character. Kati was born in Germany and raised in Shanghai, China, where her parents are associated with Sai, her first and only known friend. Unknown to her during her time after being freed from Mycale's possession, it was likely that Anonym Merel saved her life at cost of being possessed by Mycale. Once Kati unexpectedly awaken at Tsampo Valley, Tibet, she found a morningstar wand called "Wand of Evil Eye: Morgenstern", and learns that Sai was the one who gave it to her for her own protection. The morningstar she wields holds a dangerous power that may curse its user with its eye. Thankfully, Kati is taught by Sai to be immune to the staff's curse with both index and pinky fingers holding up. Despite Mycale committing unforgivable crimes (including using Kati's body as her previous host), Kati still views her as a friend, due to being lonely like her.

- Anonym-Guard (アノニミ・ガード, Anoninum Gādo)

Voiced by: Strange Heke (EN1), Haruno Fujiwara (EN1A 1.20 onward)
The Anonym Merel's replacement and superior, after her disappearance and being possessed by Mycale. She is an elite palace guard of the Holy Club from an elite palace branch that is based on Switzerland, whose fighting style is an improved version of Merel's martial arts. Following Merel's disappearance, Anonym-Guard begin to search for her and free her from Mycale's possession.

- Tempelritter (テンペルリッター, Tenperurittā)

Voiced by: Kaori Ota
The female clones of Valkyria, who resemble Nazi Valkyries serving as the Neu Tempera Orden's foot soldiers like Elektrosoldat. Furthermore, Tempelritter's creation also directly comes from a genetic template of Valkyria's current host, Mitford, who was an early clone of Tempelritter batch. Despite wielding a whip-devil sword Laevateinn and a wearing a power level analyzer-based suit Vrilbeobachteranzug, Tempelritter wields imitation versions due to being clone foot soldiers. Despite having an unstable bloodlust when it reaches too far as the main flaws, they are still warriors at heart.

- Valkyria (ヴァルキュリア, Varukyuria)

Voiced by: Kaori Ota
A self-proclaimed destroyer of the world who is both ancient Battle Maiden and a grandmaster (dubbed Praeses) of Neu Tempera Orden. After her soul was sealed inside the Heilige Lanze Gungnir, at some point during the beginning of World War II, a prototype clone of Unity Mitford called "Mitford" stumbled upon the lance and touches it. However, Mitford committed suicide by shooting her own head to prevent Valkyria from possessing her. Unfortunately, the lance already fused with Mitford's body, as her soul ceased to exist, Valkyria's soul becomes dormant and heal Mitford's corpse. While possibly being an inspiration of Mycale's Dainsleif on having similar host possession attributes, Valkyria's Gungnir cannot be easily removed from her host, due to the lance fuses with the host body and can be summon from a thin air. Sometimes later, like Adler, she also have let herself be cloned to mass-produce Tempelritter army, similar to Adler's Elektrosoldat. In additions to Gungnir, she also wears and wields original Vrilbeobachteranzug and Laevateinn. She briefly appeared as part of Mycale's Reflector moves in Akatsuki-titles, until properly she made her debut in the sequel EN-Eins. In the original version of the second game, she was simply a power-up palette swap final boss version of Tempelritter, such as can use EX/Super gauge moves infinitely, even after “Perfektewelt” state being used and was highly recommended for the players to prepare a Reflector against her. Later being re-introduced as a fully playable balanced character in 1.10 update of the second game's update title, Anastasis, to differentiate herself from her clone's moveset.

=== Introduced in EN-Eins Perfektewelt Anastasis ===
- Inazuma (イナズマ) (real name: Energaia Neun (エネルゲイア・ノイン, Enerugeia Noin), or EN-Neun (エヌノイン, EN-Noin) for short)

Voiced by: Mahatto
Tentatively under an unidentified Blitzsoldier generic name. A mysterious unidentified Type-1 Blitzsoldier who rides the weaponized one seated motorcycle-like Elektromagnetisch Tracked Vehicle, and is thought to be the robotic counterparts of Akatsuki. He was originally found unused in the original version of EN-Eins as an incomplete character. Based on his designs and move sets, Inazuma is a homage to Kamen Riders. Inazuma's origin begins when Murakumo (now possessing Senke's body after Akatsuki, Kanae, Marilyn and Wei killed the previous body) took over the Land Research Institute's development. In reality, he was once known a ninth Energaia clone, the other surviving member his nearly extinct cloning batch besides EN-Eins, having been experimented by Murakumo to be equipped with Type-1 Blitz tech. By the time EN-Neun becomes Inazuma, he immediately escapes from Murakumo and discarded his former name, off-screen, until he resurface from the shadow few years later where the Neu Tempera Orden wages war against humanity. He aim to obtain a godhood for himself, making him a polar opposite to both Akatsuki and EN-Eins, but not as ambitious as Murakumo. Although Inazuma is not actually different than Akatsuki for having similar motives, as his reason to achieve godhood is to ensure its power never fell to the wrong hands.

- 2 unnamed characters were originally planned through the crowdfunding stretch goal for their initial inclusion in this game’s full launch, with the second fighter originally set to be a non-playable true final boss of the updated game. However, in the end, the crowdfunding did not meet its goals for their inclusions in the updated game, by the time the crowdfunding ends, leaving their fates unknown.

== Development ==
The founder of the dōjin circle Subtle Style, known as 'Subtle', had previously worked for a video game company helping develop numerous fighting games. After leaving the company in April 2000, Subtle founded Subtle Style and began development of Akatsuki Shisei Ichigō as a prototype first entry to the series. Shisei Ichigo released in November 2003 for Microsoft Windows, and would later receive a finalized version under the title Akatsuki Blitzkampf on April 30, 2007. Following the success of Blitzkampf, Subtle Style shifted to a focus on Arcades, and released the arcade-only update title Akatsuki Blitzkampf Ausf. Achse, powered by Sega NAOMI and published by PIC on February 28, 2008.

Subtle later produced a sequel to Akatsuki Blitzkampf Ausf. Achse, known as EN-Eins Perfektewelt, featuring a new protagonist and updated gameplay. The initial release was published by Rutubo Games Work exclusively in the Japanese arcade, first on the SYSTEM BOARD Y 2 on June 25, 2010, before being released digitally via NESiCAxLive on February 22, 2012. The series was put on hiatus as Subtle became a recurring freelance sprite artist for French Bread. This resulted in Akatsuki appearing as a guest character in French Bread's game Under Night In-Birth, and then through French Bread's relationship with Arc System Works, appearing again in BlazBlue: Cross Tag Battle. These guest appearances brought a new recognition of the Akatsuki EN-Eins series, particularly to unfamiliar Western audiences.

On March 26, 2019, it was revealed on Subtle Style's blog that Akatsuki Blitzkampf Ausf. Achse would be ported to Microsoft Windows, though it was subsequently delayed due to the emergence of the COVID-19 pandemic, leaving the release date unknown. Subtle Style has since been asked about a possible Steam release.

Ten years after the release of its NESICAxLive arcade port, just as the COVID-19 pandemic progressively decrease of Japanese arcade marketing, EN-Eins Perfektewelt received a finalized version under the title EN-Eins Perfektewelt Anastasis. The crowdfunding for the development of Anastasis ran from April 26, 2022, until June 5, 2022. Additionally, the crowdfunding was supported by a charity tournament of original EN-Eins Perfektewelt at Gamecenter on May 29, 2022. On July 18, 2022, Subtle Style and Ko-Hatsu revealed through the latter's Ci-En e-mail account that they chose NESICAxLive as the primary arcade platform for EN-Eins Perfektewelt Anastasis in response to the decrease of arcades and arcade cabinet manufacturers. At the same date, Ko-Hatsu confirmed that the current development on July is at 70%, planning, at the time, to be released in December 2022. However, the release date have been delayed to around 2023, due to last month’s climate, and ongoing COVID-19 pandemic.

== Reception ==
The first game in the series, Akatsuki Shisei Ichigō, received mixed reviews from reviewers, who praised the gameplay and art of the game but criticized the small amount characters (3 characters at launch, 5 after being patched) and various gameplay issues. Its finalized version titled Akatsuki Blitzkampf added new characters, backgrounds, and game modes, as well as added online play and further deepened the combat system. Akatsuki Blitzkampf has a strong community in Japan with tournaments and ranking battles in arcade centers like Ko-Hatsu. Outside of Japan communities have formed on websites such as Shoryuken.com (the official host of the Evolution Championship Series fighting game tournaments in the US).

== See also ==
- List of fighting games
- BlazBlue: Cross Tag Battle
- Under Night In-Birth
