= NESYS =

Arcade game network communication system

Taito NESYS
- Developer: Taito
- Type: Arcade video game network system
- Platform: Arcade video game
- Status: Active
- Website: Official website (in Japanese)

The Taito NESYS (Network Entry System) is an arcade game network communication system by Taito. It connects up arcade machines via a network, and allows players to participate in national rankings and online play, as well as allowing arcade operators to download updates for games. The Taito NESiCAxLive digital distribution system uses NESYS as its networking system.

The system uses the NESYS IC Card smart card to allow players to save game data at arcade machines; one example of this is Street Fighter IV. These cards will remain compatible with the machine even as the games it hosts change. The card itself can hold data for multiple different games at the same time. This is similar to the Konami e-AMUSEMENT system, and the smart card function of the SEGA ALL.Net system.

== See also ==
- Taito NESiCAxLive
