= Crimzon Clover =

2011 video game

- Developer: Yotsubane
- Publishers: Yotsubane, Degica
- Composer: potechi
- Platforms: Windows, Arcade, Nintendo Switch
- Release: Windows: JP: January 11, 2011; Arcade: JP: April 25, 2013; Crimzon Clover: World Ignition; Windows: WW: June 6, 2014; Crimzon Clover: World EXplosion; Nintendo Switch: WW: October 29, 2020; Windows: WW: December 6, 2021
- Genres: Scrolling shooter, bullet hell
- Mode: Single-player

Crimzon Clover (Note: Japanese: クリムゾンクローバー, Hepburn: Kurimuzon Kurōbā) is a dōjin, vertically scrolling, bullet hell shooter developed by Yotsubane and released at the 79th Comiket. Its name is a reference to the crimson clover, a species of clover native to Europe. Originally released for Windows on January 11, 2011 in Japan, a NESiCAxLive arcade version was released on April 25, 2013. An updated Windows version, entitled Crimzon Clover: World Ignition was released worldwide on June 6, 2014 via Steam, on December 3, 2014 via GOG.com. Another updated Nintendo Switch version, titled Crimzon Clover World EXplosion, released on October 29, 2020. World EXplosion was later released for Windows via Steam on December 6, 2021, replacing World Ignition on the Steam storefront after December 21, 2021.

== Gameplay ==
The player controls one of four types of ship - Type I, II, III or Z. All ships share the same control scheme, though movement speed, option arrangement, and break gauge refill differ between the three. A fourth ship, Type Z, was added for the updated World Ignition.

Controls

- Arrow keys move the craft.
- Button 1 (default Z) releases rapid fire straight ahead from both the craft and its options.
- Button 2 (default X), when held, creates a circular field around the player, denoted by a green border. When enemies move inside the border, the craft locks on to them (denoted by a blue line connecting the craft and enemies).
  - One enemy can be locked onto multiple times, but the number of times they can be locked on to depends on the amount of health remaining. For example, enemies with only 1 hit point can only be locked onto once.
  - When the ship reaches the maximum number of allotted lock-ons (16 to start, but more after being powered up/entering Break or Double Break mode), a chime plays and the blue lines connecting the craft to its targets turns red.
  - Releasing Button 2 when any number of lock-ons are active deploys a number of homing lasers equal to the number of active lock-ons.
  - Releasing a large number of lasers in one lock-on grants the player a score multiplier for a short amount of time - during the multiplier, the value of every enemy kill and item acquisition is multiplied by the current multiplier (similar to ESP Ra.De.'s secondary shot multiplier). The maximum possible multiplier is ×6.4, which is accessible only through use of Double Break Mode.
- The function of Button 3 (default C) varies depending on the current status of the Break Gauge.

The Break Gauge

In Original and Unlimited modes, using a bomb when the 'Break Mode' gauge is full activates Break Mode. This gives a small window of invincibility, increases firepower, and doubles the speed at which the "Break Rate" counter rises and falls. You can also stack one full Break Mode gauge on top of another - which activates Double-Break Mode, featuring the most intense amount of firepower and score capability. Attacking multiple enemies in a short time increases the "Break Rate" counter, which multiplies the score given for collecting the golden stars dropped by defeated enemies.

Difficulty levels

The game has 3 difficulty levels - Simple, Original, and Unlimited.

- Simple mode lacks the ability to enter Break Mode, but the Break Gauge has a special utility in this mode - as it passes 50% and 100%, the speed of bullets increases. In this way, gauge level acts similar to rank in Battle Garegga. When the Break Gauge is full, shooting enemies at point-blank range will create a shower of point items, and the score will increase automatically, similar to the Maximum bonus in the DoDonPachi series.
- Original mode allows (Double) Break Mode, and features a "Break Rate" in addition to the lock-on multiplier. Break Rate increases by shooting enemies or locking on to large groups. When in Break Mode, the Break Rate temporarily doubles, and when Double Break Mode is accessed the Rate temporarily doubles yet again. Deaths and bombs deplete the Break Gauge.
- Unlimited mode has the same play system as Original mode, but features higher bullet count. Players also have the ability to clear all bullets on the screen by hitting and killing at least one enemy with a full lock-on.

Plot

Little plot information is given, however pieces of plot information are revealed in the World Ignition edition via Steam. The player takes the role of a pilot of mysterious identity sent on a mission to assault a military base of a hostile army, and destroy a mechanical entity known as Gorgoneion which is in the process of constructing a doomsday weapon known as the Crimson Heart.

== Development and release ==
Yotsubane, the developer of Crimzon Clover, released two trial versions over the development period, and one paid trial at Comiket 78. The game was originally scheduled to come out during Comiket 78, but schoolwork forced Yotsubane to push back the release date.

- Version 0.10 has only one stage and relatively crude graphical and audio quality.
- Version 0.20 has three stages (though the Stage 3 boss is unfinished), as well as a second difficulty level, Unlimited. Only one stage of Unlimited is available.
- Version 0.30, released during Comiket 78, adds the "Double Break" mechanic (see below) and includes 3 completed stages on Original mode, as well as 2 stages on Unlimited and two stages on a new difficulty, Simple. It also adds more items to the game shop, including the ability to skip various scenes and restart the game more quickly, and a second ship type.
- Version 1.00, released during Comiket 79 and available through Toranoana online shopping and various independent retailers, contains 5 stages and two sequential true last bosses for all 3 difficulties. It also adds level practice and unlockable music pieces that can be accessed through the "Sound Test" option in the main menu.
- Version 1.01 adds replay support and western-style score display (referred to as "World") while fixing various bugs, including a scrolling bug that allowed for the duplication of the fifth boss and spawning of the second boss during the final boss fight.

A screenshot on Yotsubane's blog also shows a version labeled 0.40 however differences between this and 0.30 are unknown.

== Reception ==
Reception

Aggregate score
Aggregator	Score
GameRankings	82.5%

Review score
Publication	Score
Destructoid	8.5/10

Hardcore Gamer praised Crimzon Clover: World Ignition, giving it a 4 out of 5 and stating: "we didn't have much to say about Crimzon Clover: World Ignition that was negative. That was by design, though, as we can't fault a game for flaws it doesn't possess. If anything, the only flaws it may have are the ones intrinsic to the genre, not the game." Destructoid described the game as being similar to CAVE shooters.
