= List of Japanese arcade cabinets =

This is a list of all known Japanese arcade cabinets, also known as "candy cabinets".

The majority are sitdown cabinets, with the occasional upright (Sega Swing, SNK MV25UP-0) and cocktail (Sega Aero Table). Construction is usually of metal and plastic, with wood also being used in earlier cabinets. Colours tend to be light (normally white) and the cabinets do not allow for custom side art. This is in stark contrast to the American/European style cabinets, which are normally upright, constructed entirely of wood, dark in colour and can be completely customised for the game inside.

These cabinets are found almost exclusively within Japan, and were rarely shipped outside of eastern Asia. As a result, none to very little English information is available for the majority, with most being provided by hobbyist or specialist arcade gaming sources

== exA-Arcadia ==
=== ARC-32 ===
The exA-Arcadia ARC-32 is a modern sitdown candy cabinet which features an easy monitor rotate design held in high regard by shoot 'em up players. It features a low display lag full color range monitor unlike its contemporary, the Taito Vewlix.

- Type: Sitdown
- Released: July 2024
- Japanese Name: AAKU32
- Dimensions: W80 cm x H162 cm x D80.5 cm
- Wiring: JVS/JVS'
- Monitor: 32 in, 1080p 60 Hz 1 ms Full Color Range
- Rotatable: Yes (no rotate mechanism)
- Weight: 115 kg
- Power: 150 W
- Control Panel: 1 Player (1L6B), 2 Players (2L12B)
- Optional riser stand available to install it as an upright cabinet

== Konami ==
=== Windy ===
The Konami Windy is a sitdown candy cabinet held in high regard by shoot 'em up players. It's notable for its bright pink artwork, the smallest footprint out of all the 29 in monitor cabinets, and one of the best 15/24 kHz monitors available.

- Type: Sitdown
- Released: 1996
- Japanese Name: UINDI
- Dimensions: 750 x 905 x 1339 (1699 with marquee) mm
- Wiring: JAMMA
- Monitor: 29 in, 15/24 kHz
- Rotatable: Yes (no rotate mechanism)
- Weight: 105 kg

=== Windy II ===
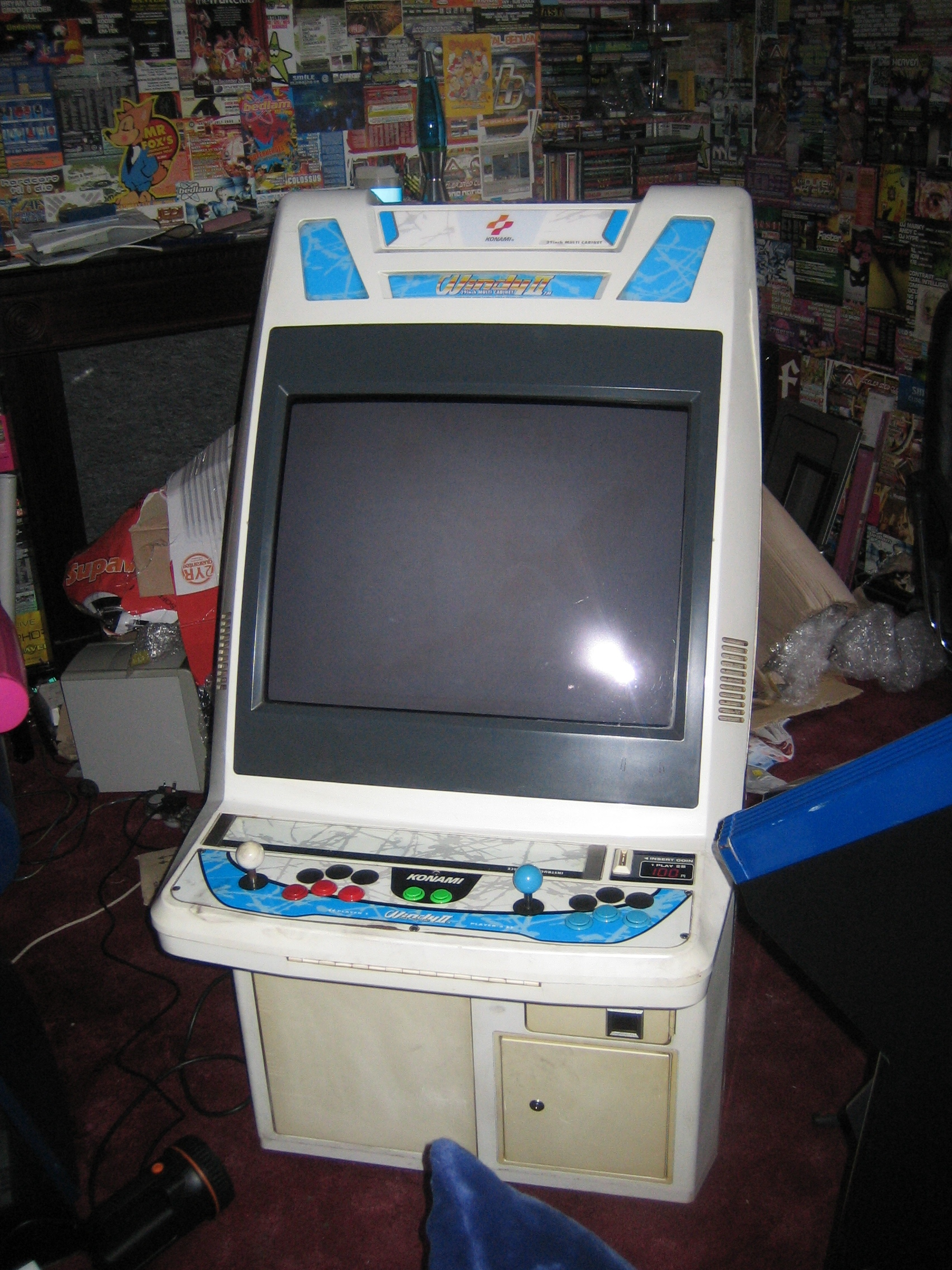
Konami Windy II

The Windy II updated the original Windy with a colour scheme change (blue), a tri-sync monitor, and with a change of I/O to the new JAMMA Video Standard (JVS). Dimensions and weight remain the same, but unfortunately the design also maintained the easily breakable neck of the original cabinet. Konami included a first party adapter to convert the cabinet to the more common JAMMA standard.

- Type: Sitdown
- Released: 1998
- Japanese Name: UINDI II
- Dimensions: 750 x 905 x 1339 (1699 with marquee) mm
- Wiring: JVS
- Monitor: 29 in, 15/24/31 kHz
- Rotatable: Yes (no rotate mechanism)
- Weight: 105 kg
- Notes: Both the Windy cabinets neither have a rotate mechanism nor a monitor frame. As a result of this the monitor is generally kept permanently in either vertical or horizontal orientation. Rotating the monitor requires extreme care – the lack of a frame leaves the fragile neck exposed and easy to snap, rendering the tube useless.

=== Domy Theater 50 ===
- Type: Sitdown
- Japanese Name: DOMISHIATA 50
- Released: 1996
- Dimensions: 1190–1885 x 2400 x 1929 mm
- Monitor: 50 in, 15/24 kHz
- Rotatable: No
- Weight: 275 kg

=== Domy Jr ===
- Type: Sitdown
- Dimensions: 630 x 780 x 1200 mm
- Monitor: 26 in
- Rotatable: Yes
- Standard: JAMMA

=== Domy Theater 33 ===
- Type: Sitdown
- Monitor: 33 in
- Dimensions: 750 x 980 x 1610 mm
- Rotateable: Yes

=== Plasma ===
- Type: Sitdown
- Dimensions: 1200 x 694 x 1775 mm

=== Sauroid ===
- Type: Upright

== Sega ==
Sega's cabinets are usually designed in their Mechatronics division.

=== City ===
- Type: Sitdown
- Release: 1986
- Dimensions: 580 x 715 x 1000 mm
- Wiring: JAMMA
- Monitor: 19 in, 15 kHz
- Weight: 60 kg
- Power: 150 W

=== Aero City ===
- Type: Sitdown
- Release: July-1988
- Dimensions: 660 x 955 x 1320 mm
- Wiring: JAMMA
- Monitor: 26 in, 15/24 kHz
- Rotatable: Yes (no rotate mechanism)
- Weight: 110 kg
- Power: 125 W

=== Aero Table ===
- Type: Cocktail
- Release: 1988
- Dimensions: 900 x 900 x 640 (to table top) / 1120 (to marquee top) mm
- Wiring: JAMMA
- Monitor: 26 in, 15 kHz
- Rotatable: Yes (no rotate mechanism)
- Weight: 90 kg
- Power: 150 W

=== Astro City ===
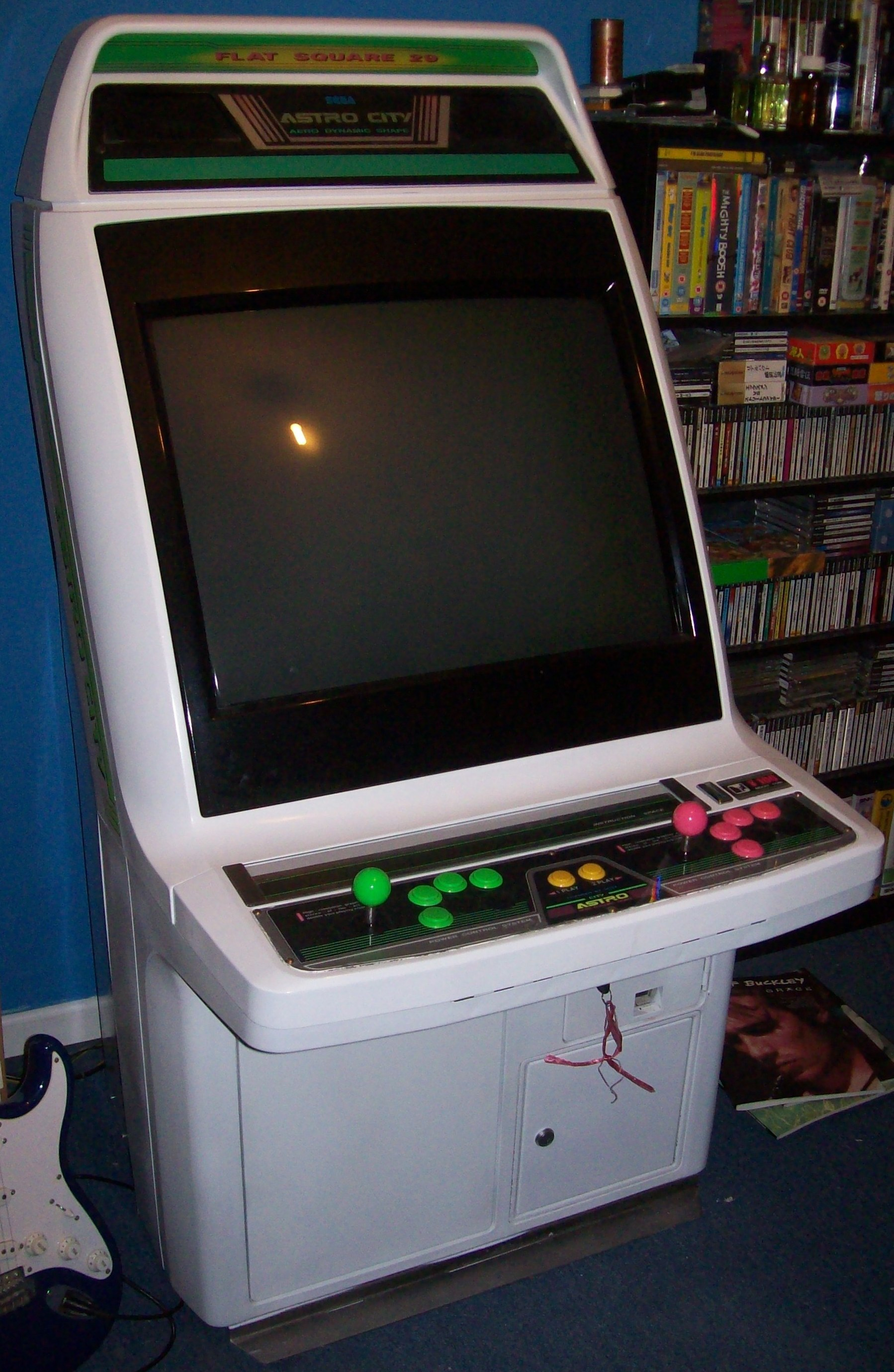
Sega Astro City

- Type: Sitdown
- Japanese Name: ASUTOROSHITI
- Release: February-1993
- Dimensions: 750 x 905 x 1445 mm
- Wiring: JAMMA
- Monitor: Nanao MS8, 29 in, 15/24 kHz
- Rotatable: Yes (no rotate mechanism)
- Weight: 93 kg
- Power: 140 W

=== Blast City ===
- Type: Sitdown
- Japanese Name: BURASUTOSHITI
- Release: October 1996
- Dimensions: 760 x 939 x 1643 mm
- Wiring: JAMMA
- Monitor: 29 in, 15/24/31 kHz
- Rotatable: Yes (no rotate mechanism)

=== New Astro City ===
- Type: Sitdown
- Released: 1995
- Dimensions: 750 x 905 x 1445 mm
- Wiring: JAMMA
- Monitor: Nanao MS9, 29 in, 15/24 kHz
- Rotatable: Yes (no rotate mechanism)

=== Astro City II ===
- Type: Sitdown
- Released: 1997
- Dimensions: 770 x 1040 x 1450 mm
- Wiring: JAMMA
- Monitor: Nanao, 29 in, 15/24 kHz
- Rotatable: Yes (no rotate mechanism)

=== Super Megalo ===
- Type: Sitdown
- Dimensions: 1140 x 2250 x 1867 mm

=== Super Megalo 2 ===
- Type: Sitdown
- Released: June 1994
- Dimensions: 1140 x 3100 x 1867 mm
- Monitor: 50 in, 15/24 kHz
- Weight: 330 kg

=== Megalo 410 ===
- Type: Sitdown
- Released: July 1996
- Dimensions: 890 x 1180 x 1630 mm
- Monitor: 41 in, 15/24/31 kHz
- Wiring: JAMMA
- Weight: 134 kg
- Power: 354 W
- Rotatable: No

=== Megalo 50 ===
- Type: Sitdown
- Dimensions: 1230 x 2260~3200 x 1880 mm
- Monitor: 50 in, 15/24 kHz
- Wiring: JAMMA
- Rotatable: No
- Weight: 378 kg
- Power: 301 W

=== Naomi Deluxe Universal ===
- Type: Sitdown
- Released: 2005
- Dimensions: 1054 x 1981 x 2144 mm
- Monitor: 38 in
- Wiring: JVS
- Rotatable: No
- Weight: 308 kg

=== Naomi 50 Universal ===
- Type: Sitdown
- Dimensions: 1150 x 2130 x 2015 mm
- Monitor: 50 in
- Rotatable: No
- Wiring: JVS
- Weight: 258 kg

=== Versus City ===
- Type: Sitdown
- Japanese Name: VASASUSHITI
- Released: January 1996
- Dimensions: 750 x 1834 x 1950 mm
- Monitor: 29 in, 15/24 kHz
- Wiring: JAMMA
- Rotatable: No

=== New Versus City ===
- Type: Sitdown
- Japanese Name: NEW VASASUSHITI
- Released: November 1996
- Dimensions: 750 x 1834 x 1678 mm
- Rotatable: Yes

=== Swing ===
- Type: Upright
- Released: 1991
- Dimensions: 880 x 995 x 1980 mm
- Wiring: JAMMA
- Monitor: 26 in, 15/24 kHz
- Rotatable: Yes
- Weight: 125 kg
- Power: 125 W

=== Naomi Universal ===
- Type: Sitdown/Upright
- Released: March 1999
- Dimensions: Sitdown – 760 x 980 x 1750 mm Upright: 760 x 968 x 2030 mm
- Wiring: JVS
- Monitor: 29 in, 31 kHz
- Rotatable: Yes
- Weight: 117 kg
- Power: 322 W

=== Net City ===
- Type: Sitdown/Upright
- Released: December 1999
- Dimensions: Sitdown – 760 x 980 x 1750 mm Upright: 760 x 968 x 2030 mm
- Wiring: JVS
- Monitor: 29 in, 15/24/31 kHz
- Rotatable: Yes
- Weight: 117 kg
- Power: 322 W

=== New Net City ===
- Type: Sitdown/Upright
- Dimensions: Sitdown – 760 x 980 x 1750 mm Upright: 760 x 968 x 2030 mm
- Wiring: JVS
- Monitor: 29 in, 15/24/31 kHz
- Rotatable: Yes
- Weight: 117 kg
- Power: 322 W

=== Lindbergh Universal ===
- Type: Sitdown/Upright
- Released: 2007
- Dimensions: 820 x 827 x 1800 (2100 with marquee) mm
- Monitor: 32 in widescreen, 31–60 kHz
- Wiring: JVS
- Rotatable: No
- Weight: 122 kg
- Power: 460 W

ALL.Net P-ras MULTI Version 3

- Type: Sitdown
- Released: 2019
- Dimensions: 736 x 801 x 2130 (1502 w/o billboard) mm
- Wiring: JVS/USB
- Monitor: 32 in 1920x1080 LCD monitor (1080P LCD Monitor)
- Rotatable: No
- Weight: 127 kg

== Jaleco ==
=== Table Pony ===
- Type: Cocktail

=== Table Pony 25 ===
- Type: Cocktail
- Wiring: JAMMA
- Monitor: 25 in, 15 kHz
- Dimensions: 625 x 860 x 670 mm
- Rotateable: No
- Weight: 59.5 kg
- Power: 82 W

=== Table Pony 25 VH ===
- Type: Cocktail
- Wiring: JAMMA
- Monitor: 25 in, 15 kHz
- Dimensions: 625 x 860 x 770 mm
- Rotateable: Yes
- Weight: 71 kg
- Power: 130 W

=== Pony ===
- Type: Sitdown

=== Pony Mark II 19 ===
- Type: Sitdown
- Released: 1996
- Monitor: 19 in
- Dimensions: 560 x 650 x 1050 mm

=== Pony Mark II 27 ===
- Type: standup
- Released: 1992

=== Pony Mark III ===
- Type: Sitdown
- Released: 1997

=== Pony Mark IV ===
- Type: Sitdown
- Dimensions: 860 x 730 x 1360 mm
- Rotateable: Yes
- Wiring: JAMMA

=== Pony Mark V ===
- Type: Sitdown

=== Pony 40 ===
- Type: Sitdown
- Dimensions: 1140 x 2120 x 1755 mm
- Weight: 160 kg
- Monitor: 42 in
- Power: 330 W

== Irem ==
=== Madonna ===
- Type: Sitdown
- Dimensions: 620 x 840 x 1320 mm
- Weight: 100 kg
- Monitor: 25 in 15/24 kHz
- Rotatable : Yes (no easy rotation)
- Power: 120 W

=== Madonna 33 ===
- Type: Sitdown

== Capcom ==
=== BGS-25 ===
- Type: Sitdown
- Dimensions: 800 x 965 x 1435 mm
- Note: Usually called the Capcom Q25

=== Impress ===
- Type: Sitdown
- Monitor: 29 in, 15 kHz
- Dimensions: 730 x 920 x 1460 mm
- Weight: 110 kg
- Power: 150 W

=== Cute ===
- Type: Sitdown
- Dimensions: 500 x 690 x 1300 mm
- Wiring: JAMMA
- Rotation : Yes, it's proved
- Weight: 60 kg

=== Status 18 ===
- Type: Sitdown
- Dimensions: 560 x 660 x 1105 mm
- Monitor: 18 in
- Weight: 60 kg

=== Status 25 ===
- Type: Sitdown
- Dimensions: 598 x 785 x 1133 mm
- Monitor: 25 in
- Weight: 70 kg

=== Playzass ===
- Type: Upright
- Dimensions: 760 x 980 x 1750 mm

=== Captain IV ===
- Type: Upright
- Monitor: 29 in
- Dimensions: 1870 x 1104 x 1130 mm
- Weight: 140 kg
- Power: 160 W

=== CAV 2 OOB 60 ===
- Type: Upright
- Monitor: 60 in

=== OOB-50 ===
- Type: Sitdown
- Dimensions: 1140 x 2200 x 1875 mm
- Monitor: 50 in, 15/24 kHz
- Wiring: JAMMA
- Weight: 270 kg
- Power: 350 W

=== CAV System 60 ===
- Type: Sitdown
- Dimensions: 2463 x 1500 x 3005 mm
- Monitor: 60 in

== Sigma ==
=== Game Explorer ===
- Type: Sitdown
- Dimensions: 750 x 1696 x 925
- Monitor: Panasonic 29 in
- Chassis: Toei 15/24/31 kHz
- Wiring: JAMMA/Half JVS
- Weight: 98.5 kg
- Power: 100 W

== SNK ==
=== Candy 18 ===
- Type: Sitdown
- Monitor: 18 in
- Wiring: JAMMA

=== Candy 25 ===
- Type: Sitdown
- Monitor: 25 in
- Dimensions: 620 x 790 x 1216 (1486 with marquee) mm
- Wiring: JAMMA
- Power: 120 W

=== Candy 26 ===
- Type: Sitdown
- Monitor: 26 in
- Wiring: JAMMA

=== MV19SC-0 ===
- Type: Upright
- Monitor: 19 in
- Dimensions: 550 x 680 x 1510 mm
- Power: 180 W
- Wiring: JAMMA/MVS
- Weight: 70 kg

=== MV25TA-0 ===
- Type: Cocktail
- Monitor: 25 in
- Dimensions: 900 x 800 x 1121 (1258 at maximum tilt) mm
- Wiring: JAMMA/MVS
- Power: 180 W
- Weight: 103 kg

=== MV25U4-0 ===
- Type: Upright
- Monitor: 25 in
- Dimensions: 640 x 920 x 1930 mm
- Wiring: JAMMA/MVS
- Power: 180 W
- Weight: 185 kg

=== MV25U6-0 ===
- Type: Upright
- Monitor: 25 in
- Dimensions: 810 x 920 x 1930 mm
- Wiring: JAMMA/MVS
- Power: 180 W
- Weight: 200 kg

=== MV25UP-0 ===
- Type: Sitdown
- Monitor: 25 in
- Dimensions: 680 x 850 x 1724 mm
- Wiring: JAMMA/MVS
- Power: 180 W
- Weight: 103 kg

=== MVS-U1/33 ===
- Type: Sitdown
- Monitor: 33 in
- Wiring: JAMMA/MVS

=== MVS-U2 ===
- Type: Sitdown
- Monitor: 25 in
- Dimensions: 620 x 790 x 1266 mm
- Wiring: JAMMA/MVS
- Power: 120 W
- Notes: Became known as an MVS-U2/25 once the larger screen U2's were released.

=== MVS-U2/29 ===
- Type: Sitdown
- Monitor: 29 in
- Wiring: JAMMA/MVS

=== MVS-U2/33 ===
- Type: Sitdown
- Monitor: 33 in
- Wiring: JAMMA/MVS

=== MVS-U4 ===
- Type: Sitdown
- Monitor: 25 in
- Dimensions: 620 x 790 x 1266 mm
- Wiring: JAMMA/MVS
- Power: 120 W
- Notes: Became known as an MVS-U4/25 once the larger screen U4's were released.

=== MVS-U4/29 ===
- Type: Sitdown
- Monitor: 29 in
- Dimensions: 695 x 870 x 1346 mm
- Wiring: JAMMA/MVS
- Power: 120 W

=== MVS-U4/33 ===
- Type: Sitdown
- Monitor: 33 in
- Wiring: JAMMA/MVS

=== Neo 19 ===
- Type: Sitdown
- Monitor: 19 in
- Dimensions: 520 x 646 x 1340 mm
- Wiring: JAMMA/MVS
- Weight: 60 kg
- Power: 100 W

=== Neo 25 ===
- Type: Sitdown
- Monitor: 25 in
- Dimensions: 630 x 850 x 1368 mm
- Wiring: JAMMA/MVS
- Weight: 89 kg
- Power: 120 W

=== Neo 29 ===
- Type: Sitdown
- Monitor: 29 in
- Dimensions: 715 x 958 x 1440 mm
- Wiring: JAMMA/MVS
- Weight: 108 kg
- Power: 120 W

=== Neo 50 ===
- Type: Sitdown
- Wiring: JAMMA/MVS

=== Neo 50 II ===
- Type: Sitdown
- Wiring: JAMMA/MVS
- Dimensions: 1995 x 800 x 1200 mm

=== Neo 50 III ===
- Type: Sitdown
- Wiring: JAMMA/MVS/HNG
- Dimensions: 1146 x 681 x 1900 mm (Monitor section), 960 x 1320 x 902 mm (Monitor section)
- Power: 325 W
- Weight: 300 kg (Total), 140 kg (Monitor section), 160 kg (Control panel section)

=== Neo Candy 25 ===
- Type: Sitdown
- Wiring: JAMMA/MVS
- Dimensions: 600 x 890 x 1200 mm

=== Neo Candy 29 ===
- Type: Sitdown
- Wiring: JAMMA/MVS

=== SC14-2 ===
- Type: Sitdown
- Monitor: 14 in
- Dimensions: 420 x 555 x 1224 mm
- Wiring: JAMMA/MVS
- Power: 75 W

=== SC19-4 ===
- Type: Sitdown
- Monitor: 19 in
- Dimensions: 510 x 595 x 1282 mm
- Wiring: JAMMA/MVS
- Power: 100 W

=== SC25-4 ===
- Type: Sitdown
- Monitor: 25 in
- Dimensions: 600 x 708 x 1414 mm
- Wiring: JAMMA/MVS
- Power: 120 W

=== SCB-U4 ===
- Type: Upright
- Dimensions: 520 x 655 x 1412 mm
- Wiring: JAMMA/MVS
- Power: 100 W

=== Super Neo 29 ===
- Type: Sitdown
- Monitor: 29 in
- Wiring: JAMMA/MVS

=== Super Neo 28 Candy ===
- Type: Sitdown, or standup, vice versus
- Released: 1996-97
- Monitor: 33 in, 15/25 kHz
- Wiring: JAMMA/MVS, kbh, or standard kbh-vhsh
- Dimensions: 745 x 897 x 1437 mm

=== Super Neo 29 Type II ===
- Type: Sitdown
- Dimensions: 710 x 890 x 1927 mm (including marquee)
- Monitor: 29 in
- Wiring: JAMMA/MVS
- Power: 200 W
- Weight: 102 kg

=== Video game ===
- Type: Sitdown
- Dimensions: 580 x 750 x 1120 mm

== Taito ==
=== Canary ===
- Type: Sitdown
- Released: 1991
- Dimensions: 660 x 805 x 1280 (1710 with marquee) mm
- Wiring: JAMMA
- Monitor: Nanao MS8, 25 in, 15/24 kHz
- Rotation: Yes (no rotate mechanism)

=== Egret 29 ===
- Type: Sitdown
- Japanese Name: 29 IGURETTO
- Released: 1994
- Dimensions: 695 x 794 x 1580 mm
- Weight: 95 kg
- Monitor: Nanao MS8, 29 in, 15/24 kHz
- Rotatable: Yes (rotate mechanism)
- Standard: JAMMA

=== Egret II ===
- Type: Sitdown
- Japanese Name: IGURETTO II
- Released: 1996
- Dimensions: 750 x 903 x 1450 mm (1765 mm including Marquee)
- Weight 102 kg
- Power 125 W
- Monitor: Nanao MS9, 29 in, 15/24 kHz
- Rotatable: Yes (rotate mechanism)
- Standard: JAMMA

=== Egret 3 ===
- Type: Sitdown
- Japanese Name: IGURETTO 3
- Released: 2003
- Monitor: 29 in, 15/24/31 kHz
- Dimensions: 750 x 903 x 1450 mm

=== Teatro Ex 33 ===
- Type: Sitdown
- Rotatable: Not by design.

=== Teatro 50 ===
- Type: Sitdown
- Monitor: 50 in, 15/24 kHz
- Dimensions: 1160 x 2430~3700 x 1900 mm
- Weight: 230 kg
- Power: 325 W

=== Hatris ===
- Dimensions: 720 x 410 x 510 mm

=== MT5 ===
- Type: Sitdown
- Released: 1989
- Dimensions: 750 x 980 x 500 mm

=== MT2 ===
- Type: Sitdown
- Released: 1987

=== Uni ===
- Dimensions: 1995 x 800 x 1200 mm

=== Vewlix ===
- Type: Sitdown
- Dimensions: 798 x 798 x 1570 mm
- Monitor: 32in LCD, 720p HD
- Rotatable: Yes
- Weight: 120 kg
- Power: 170 W

== Namco ==
=== Cyber Lead ===
- Type: Sitdown
- Released: 1997
- Japanese Name: SAIBARIDO
- Dimensions: 760 x 970 x 1480 mm
- Wiring: JVS
- Monitor: Nanao MS9, 29 in, 15/24 kHz
- Rotatable: No
- Weight: 120 kg
- Power: 120 W

=== Cyber Lead II ===
- Type: Sitdown
- Released: September 2000
- Japanese Name: SAIBARIDO II
- Dimensions: 760 x 970 x 1480 mm
- Wiring: JVS
- Monitor: Nanao 15/24/31 kHz
- Rotatable: No
- Weight: 120 kg
- Power: 120 W

=== Dynalive ===
- Type: Sitdown
- Japanese Name: DAINARAIVU
- Dimensions: 750 x 905 x 1699 mm

=== Excelcabinet ===
- Type: Sitdown
- Japanese Name: EKUSERUKYABINETTO
- Monitor: 25 in

=== Exceleena 1 ===
- Type: Sitdown
- Monitor: 29 in
- Dimensions: 978 x 940 x 1473 mm

=== Exceleena 2 ===
- Type: Sitdown
- Dimensions: 860 x 730 x 1360 mm

=== Arena Site ===
- Type:Sitdown
- Monitor: 50 in

=== Noir ===
- Type: Sitdown
- Released: 2007
- Monitor: 32 in

== Tecmo ==
=== Kyotaro ===
- Type: Sitdown

=== Urban ===
- Type: Sitdown

== Sammy ==
=== Atomiswave SD ===
- Type: Sitdown
- Released: 2003
- Monitor: Wei-Ya 29 in, 15/24/31 kHz
- Dimensions: 750 x 903 x 1450 mm
- Notes: A rebranded Taito Egret 3

=== Atomiswave ===
- Type: Upright

=== Seychelles ===
- Dimensions: 730 x 869 x 1362 mm

== Sunsoft ==
=== Rana ===
- Type: Sitdown
- Monitor: 18 in
- Dimensions: 550 x 600 x 1350 mm
- Weight: 55 kg
- Power 105 W

== River Service ==
=== Delta ===
- Type: Sitdown
- Monitor: 32 in
- Wiring: JAMMA

=== New Delta ===
- Type: Sitdown
- Monitor: 32 in
- Wiring: JVS

== Lucky ==
=== Galaxy ===
- Type: Sitdown
- Monitor: 32 in
- Wiring: JAMMA

== MSP ==
=== Joymax ===
- Silkroad online
- Deco Online

== Other ==
=== AMBO ===
- Type: Sitdown

=== MAS 25 ===
- Type: Sitdown
