= E-Amusement =

Konami arcade game service

e-Amusement
- e-Amusement Pass design, 2017
- Developer: Konami
- Type: Arcade video game network system
- Launched: 2003
- Platform: Arcade video game
- Status: Active
- Website: Official website (in Japanese)

e-Amusement, stylized as e-amusement, is an online service operated by Konami, used primarily for online functionality on its arcade video games. The system is used primarily to save progress and unlockable content between games, participate in internet high score lists, access other exclusive features depending on the game, and access the Paseli digital currency service.

The system uses online user accounts tied to a contactless smart card system called the "e-Amusement Pass". Users log into an e-Amusement enabled game by holding their pass up to the card reader and using a PIN.

The system is similar to parts of the functionality of the rival Taito NESYS and SEGA ALL.Net systems.

== Magnetic cards ==
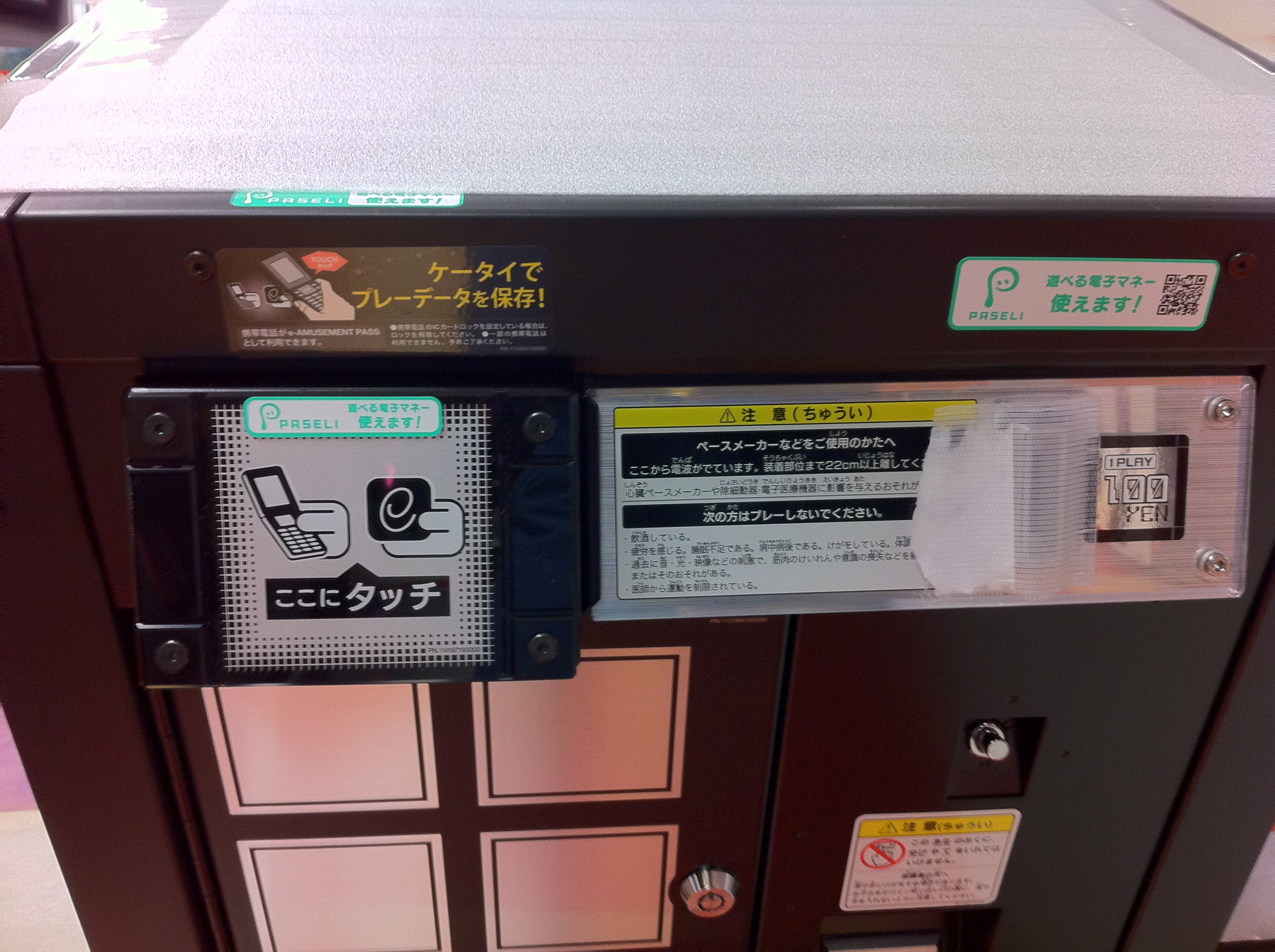
An e-Amusement card reader on a Jubeat machine

Prior to 2006, e-Amusement used magnetic stripe cards called Entry Passes that were sold separately for each game using the platform, either from an arcade desk or through a vending machine. Each card held data for one player, and typically came in 5 designs specific to the game (usually featuring character artwork). "Special" cards were also distributed from time to time, often alongside the console versions of certain games; these cards could sometimes be used to unlock special content in their respective game. These were exclusive to each title and could not be used on other games. For instance, the entry card for "beatmania IIDX 9th Style" could not be used for "pop'n music 9". In addition to this, even for the same title, an entry card for a particular entry in a series could not be used in a new release, and so cards had to be repurchased.

== e-Amusement Pass ==
In 2006, Konami began to phase out the original magnetic card system in favor of the e-Amusement Pass; an IC contactless smartcard that works across all games that were upgraded to use the new system. The new cards also use a 4-digit PIN for security. In the event the pass is lost, its existing data can be transferred over to a new pass through Konami's website.

The pass can also be linked to a mobile phone "Konami NetDX" account, allowing players to access their scores and other data on their mobile phone. On some games, customization of the game can also be done through the NetDX system. However, only smartphones sold in Japan with FeliCa RFID support can use this function.

Starting with the fourth generation of card, the name "e-amusement pass" is written in all lowercase, rather than as "e-AMUSEMENT PASS", which coincided with the same change made on official websites.

== Features ==
The e-Amusement pass mainly functions as a method to allow players to save their progress across game sessions. Several compatible arcade game series incentivize the use of the system by offering a free round to first-time card holders.

== Games ==
Several arcade games that are compatible with e-Amusement are also playable via PC download, most of which have versions denoted as "console" releases rather than "arcade" by the name konasute (コナステ).

Game	PC	iOS/Android	Arcade	Release year
beatmania IIDX INFINITAS	Yes		Yes	2015
Bombergirl	Yes		Yes	2021
DanceDanceRevolution GRAND PRIX	Yes			2021
GITADORA Konasute	Yes			2020
Mahjong Fighting Club Extreme	Yes	Yes	Yes	2018
Nostalgia Konasute	Yes			2021
pop'n music Lively	Yes			2020
Quiz Magic Academy Konasute	Yes	Yes	Yes	2019
QuizKnock STADIUM Konasute	Yes	Yes	Yes	2022
SOUNDVOLTEX EXCEED GEAR Konasute	Yes		Yes	2021
SOUNDVOLTEX III: Gravity Wars Konasute	Yes		Yes	2017
Tenkaichi Shogikai 2	Yes	Yes	Yes	2017

== See also ==
- Taito NESYS
- SEGA ALL.Net
