= Arcade cabinet =

Housing within which an arcade game's electronic hardware resides

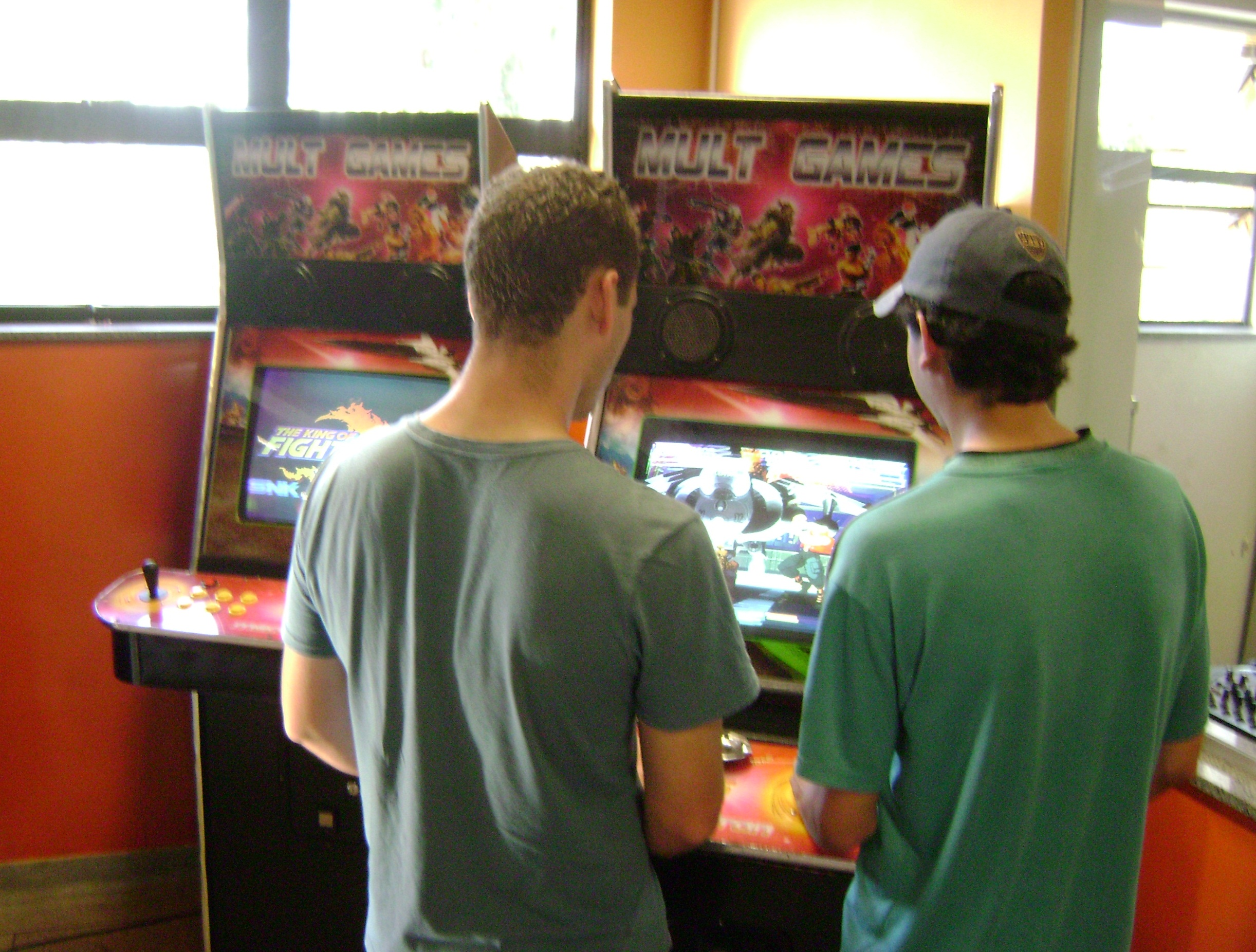
People playing an arcade game

An arcade cabinet, also known as an arcade machine or a coin-op cabinet or coin-op machine, is the housing and structural framework within which an arcade game's electronic hardware resides. Most cabinets designed since the mid-1980s conform to the Japanese Amusement Machine Manufacturers Association (JAMMA) wiring standard. Some include additional connectors for features not included in the standard.

== Parts of an arcade cabinet ==
Because arcade cabinets vary according to the games they were built for or contain, they may not possess all of the parts listed below:

- A display output, on which the game is displayed. They may display either raster or vector graphics, raster being most common. Standard resolution is between 262.5 and 315 vertical lines, depending on the refresh rate (usually between 50 and 60 Hz). Slower refresh rates allow for better vertical resolution. Monitors may be oriented horizontally or vertically, depending on the game. Some games use more than one monitor. Some newer cabinets have monitors that can display high-definition video.
- An audio output for sound effects and music, usually produced from a sound chip.
- Printed circuit boards (PCB) or arcade system boards, the actual hardware upon which the game runs. Hidden within the cabinet. Some systems, such as the SNK Neo-Geo MVS, use a mainboard with game carts. Some mainboards may hold multiple game carts as well.
- A power supply to provide DC power to the arcade system boards and low voltage lighting for the coin slots and lighted buttons.
- A marquee, a sign above the monitor displaying the game's title. They are often brightly colored and backlit.
- A bezel, which is the border around the monitor. It may contain instructions or artwork.
- A control panel, a level surface near the monitor, upon which the game's controls are arranged. Control panels sometimes have playing instructions. Players often pile their coins or tokens on the control panels of upright and cocktail cabinets.
- Coin slots, coin returns and the coin box, which allow for the exchange of money or tokens. They are usually below the control panel. Very often, translucent red plastic buttons are placed in between the coin return and the coin slot. When they are pressed, a coin or token that has become jammed in the coin mechanism is returned to the player. See coin acceptor. In some arcades, the coin slot is replaced with a card reader that reads data from a game card bought from the arcade operator.
- Service menu/mode control panel, which controls settings of the game (such as setting number of coins per credit, number of lives, and number of stages) and performs maintenance mode and diagnostics test. It is usually behind the cover for coin slots, coin return, and coin box.

The sides of the arcade cabinet are usually decorated with brightly colored stickers or paint, representing the gameplay of its particular game.

== Types of cabinets ==
There are many types of arcade cabinets, some being custom-made for a particular game; however, the most common are the upright, the cocktail or table, and the sit-down.

=== Upright cabinets ===
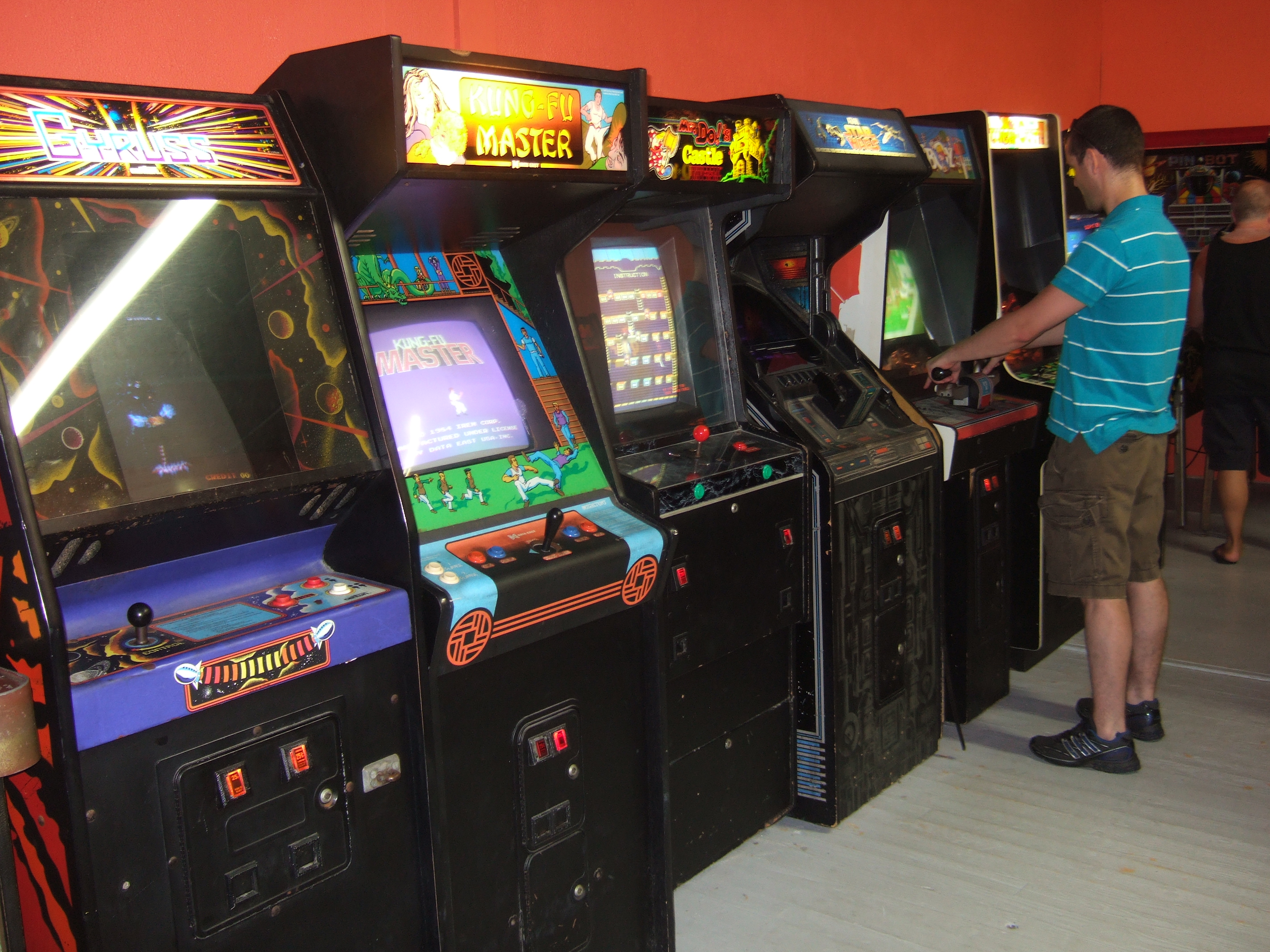
Upright cabinets

Upright cabinets are the most common in North America, with their design heavily influenced by Computer Space and Pong. While the futuristic look of Computer Space's outer fiberglass cabinet did not carry forward, both games did establish separating parts of the arcade machine for the cathode-ray tube (CRT) display, the game controllers, and the computer logic areas. Atari also had placed the controls at a height suitable for most adult players to use, but close enough to the console's base to also allow children to play. Further, the cabinets were more compact than traditional electro-mechanical games and did not use flashing lights or other means to attract players. The side panels of Atari's Pong had a simple wood veneer finish, making it easier to market to non-arcade venues, such as hotels, country clubs, and cocktail bars. In the face of growing competition, Atari started to include cabinet art and attraction panels around 1973–1974, which soon became a standard practice.

Arcade cabinets today are usually made of wood and metal, about six feet or two meters tall, with the control panel set perpendicular to the monitor at slightly above waist level. The monitor is housed inside the cabinet, at approximately eye level. The marquee is above it, and often overhangs it.

In Computer Space, Pong and other early arcade games, the CRT was mounted 90 degrees from the ground, facing directly outward. Arcade game manufacturers began incorporating design principles from older electro-mechanical games by using CRTs mounted at a 45-degree angle, facing upward and away from the player but towards a one-way mirror that reflected the display to the player. Additional transparent overlays could be added between the mirror and the player's view to include additional images and colorize the black-and-white CRT output, as is the case in Boot Hill. Other games, like Warrior, used a one-sided mirror and included an illuminated background behind the mirror, so that the on-screen characters would appear to the players as if they were on that background. With the advent of color CRT displays, the need for the mirror was eliminated. The CRT was subsequently positioned at an angle permitting a typical adult player to look directly at the screen.

Controls are most commonly a joystick for as many players as the game allows, plus action buttons and "player" buttons which serve the same purpose as the start button on console gamepads. Trackballs are sometimes used instead of joysticks, especially in games from the early 1980s. Spinners (knobs for turning, also called "paddle controls") are used to control game elements that move strictly horizontally or vertically, such as the paddles in Arkanoid and Pong. Games such as Robotron: 2084, Smash TV and Battlezone use double joysticks instead of action buttons. Some versions of the original Street Fighter had pressure-sensitive rubber pads instead of buttons.

If an upright is housing a driving game, it may have a steering wheel and throttle pedal instead of a joystick and buttons. If the upright is housing a shooting game, it may have light guns attached to the front of the machine, via durable cables. Some arcade machines had the monitor placed at the bottom of the cabinet with a mirror mounted at around 45 degrees above the screen facing the player. This was done to save space, as a large CRT monitor would otherwise poke out the back of the cabinet. To correct for the mirrored image, some games had an option to flip the video output using a dip switch setting. Other genres of games such as Guitar Freaks feature controllers resembling musical instruments.

Upright cabinet shape designs vary from the simplest symmetric perpendicular boxes as with Star Trek to complicated asymmetric forms.

Games are typically for one or two players; however, games such as Gauntlet feature as many as four sets of controls.

=== Sit-down or table cabinets ===
==== Cocktail cabinets ====
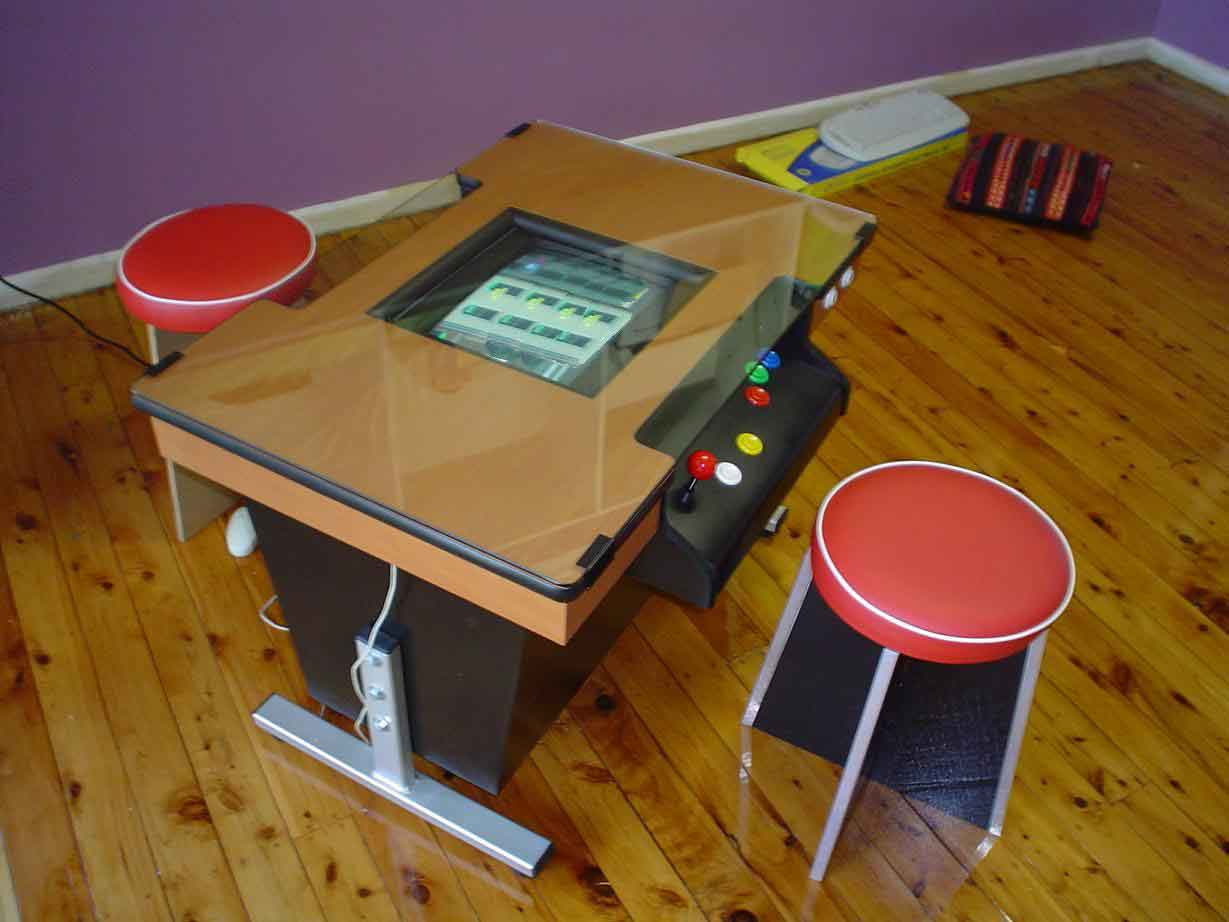
A cocktail or table cabinet. This style is sometimes referred to as Japanese or Aussie style.

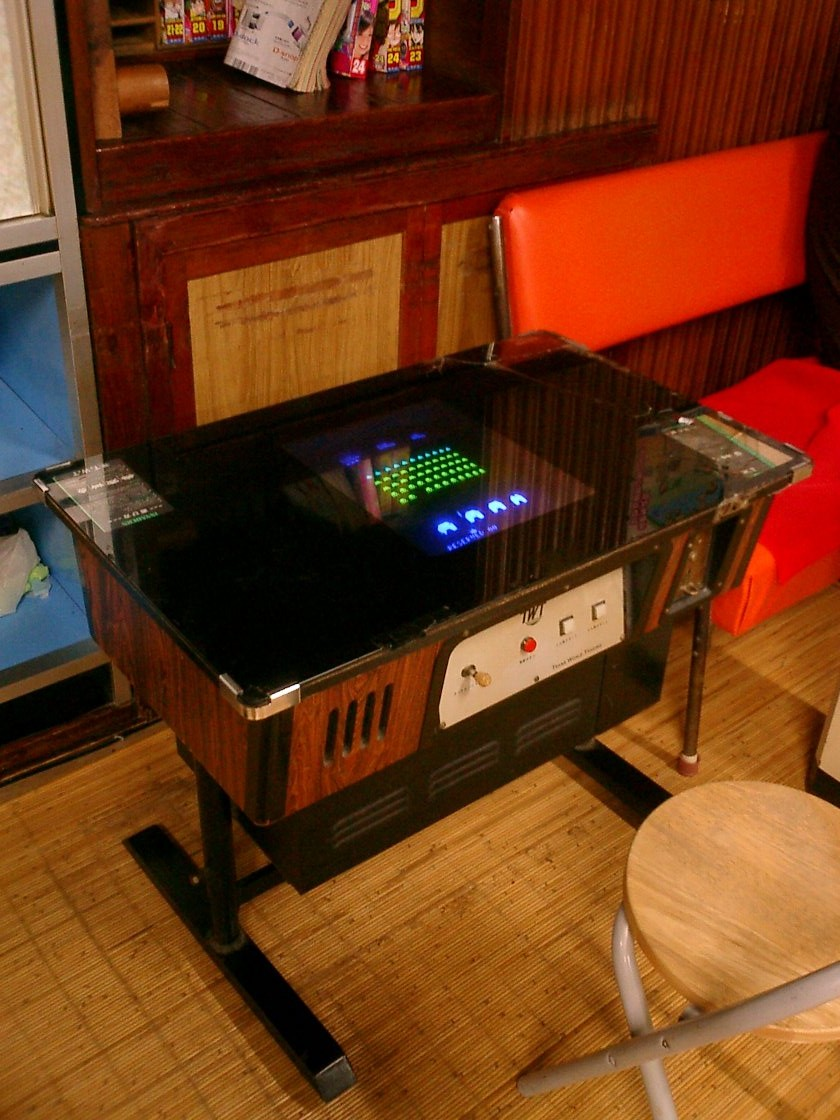
Another example of a cocktail cabinet (Space Invaders, known in Japan as T.T. Space Invaders)

Cocktail cabinets are shaped like low, rectangular tables, with the controls usually set at either of the broad ends, or, though not as common, at the narrow ends, and the monitor inside the table, the screen facing upward. Two-player games housed in cocktails were usually alternant, each player taking turns. The monitor reverses its orientation (game software controlled) for each player, so the game display is properly oriented for each player. This requires special programming of the cocktail versions of the game (usually set by dip switches). The monitor's orientation is usually in player two's favor only in two-player games when it is player two's turn and in player one's favor all other times. Simultaneous, four-player games that are built as a cocktail include Warlords, and others.

In Japan, many games manufactured by Taito from the 1970s to the early 1980s have the cocktail versions prefixed by "T.T" in their titles (eg. T.T Space Invaders).

Cocktail cabinet versions were usually released alongside the upright version of the same game. They were relatively common in the 1980s, especially during the golden age of arcade video games; however, they have since lost popularity. Their main advantage over upright cabinets was their smaller size, making them seem less obtrusive, although requiring more floor space (more so by having players seated at each end). The top of the table was covered with a piece of tempered glass, making it convenient to set drinks on (hence the name); they were often seen in bars and pubs.

==== Candy cabinets ====
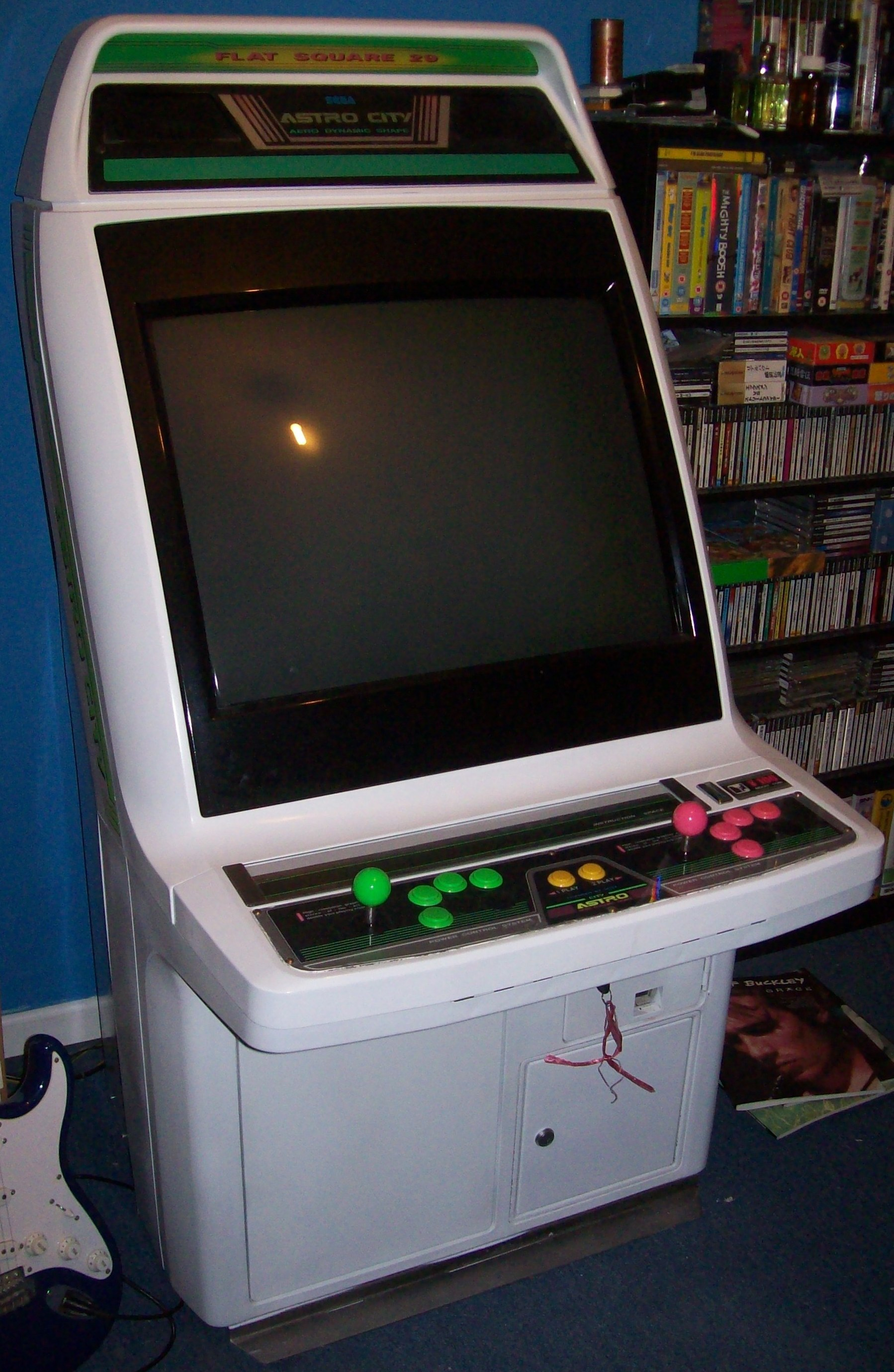
A candy cabinet (Sega Astro City)

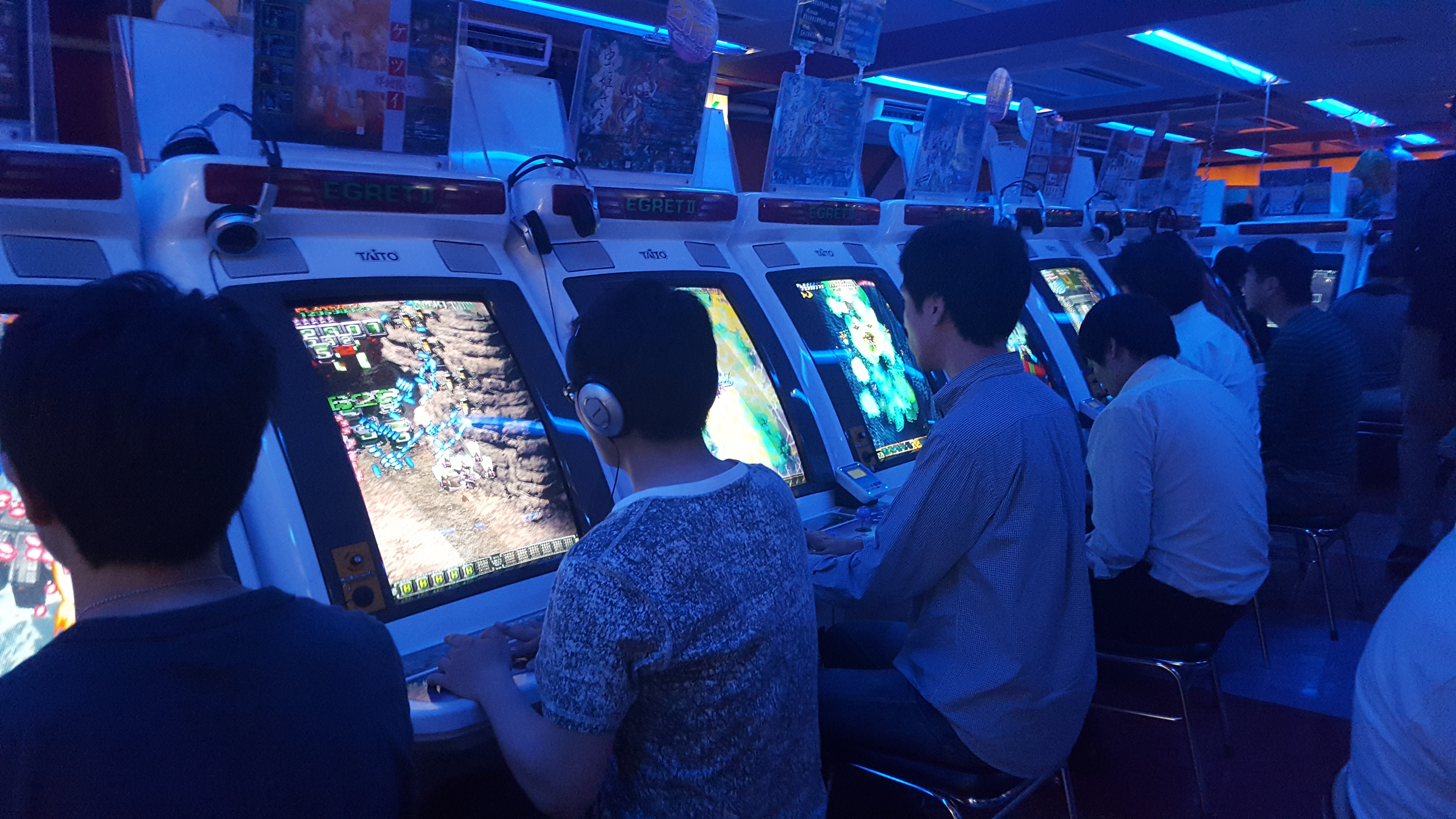
Candy cabinets at an arcade in Akihabara. Many candy cabinets have CRT screens that can be physically switched between portrait and landscape modes.

Owing to the resemblance of plastic to hard candy, they are often known as "candy cabinets", by both arcade enthusiasts and by people in the industry. They are also generally easier to clean and move than upright cabinets, but usually just as heavy as most have 29" screens, as opposed to 20"–25". They are positioned so that the player can sit down on a chair or stool and play for extended periods. SNK sold many Neo-Geo MVS cabinets in this configuration, though most arcade games made in Japan that only use a joystick and buttons will come in a sit-down cabinet variety. In Japanese arcades, this type of cabinet is generally more prevalent than the upright kind, and they are usually lined up in uniform-looking rows. A variant of this, often referred to as "versus-style" cabinets are designed to look like two cabinets facing each other, with two monitors and separate controls allowing two players to fight each other without having to share the same monitor and control area. Some newer cabinets can emulate these "versus-style" cabinets through networking.

=== Deluxe cabinets ===
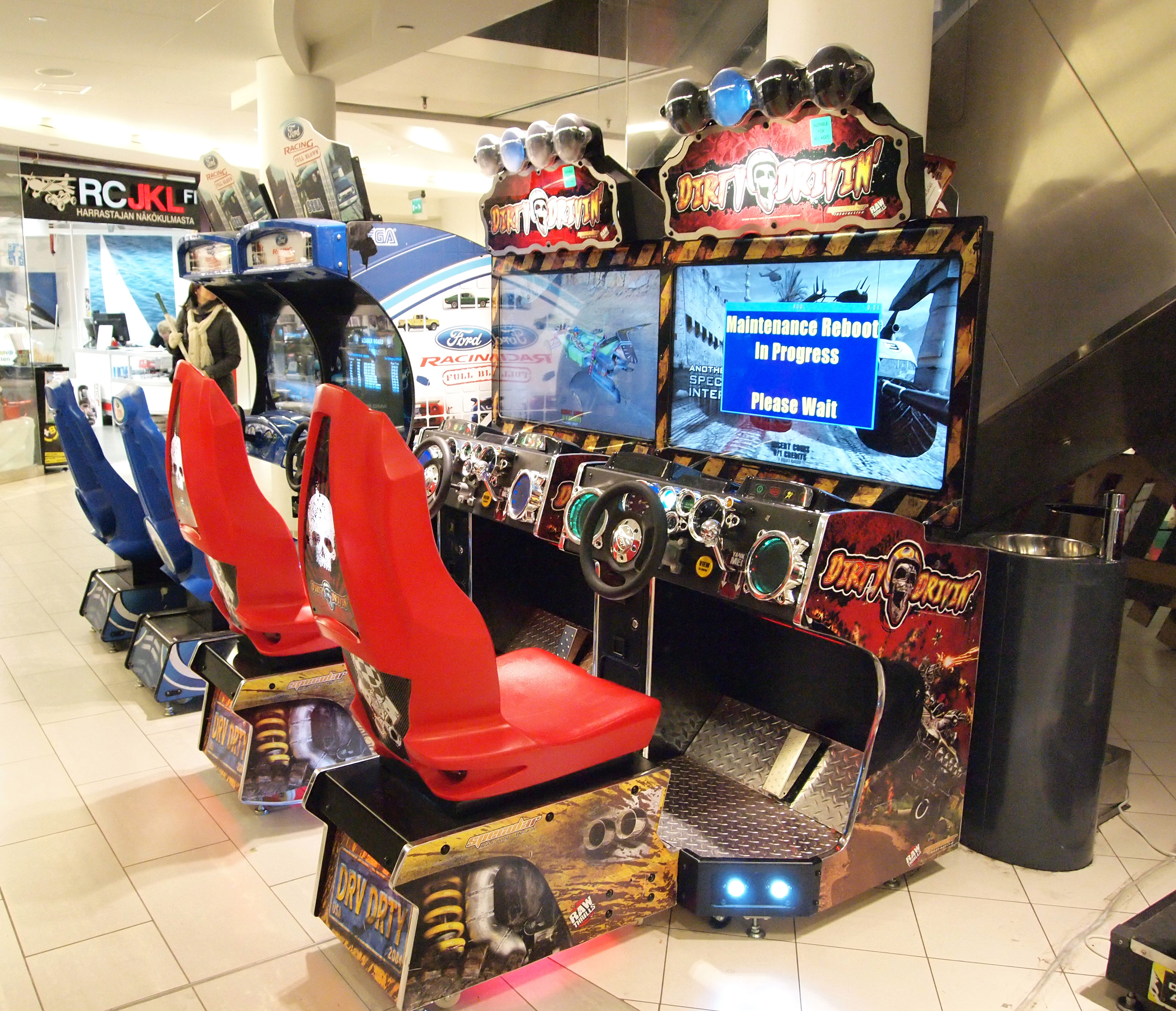
Deluxe cabinets

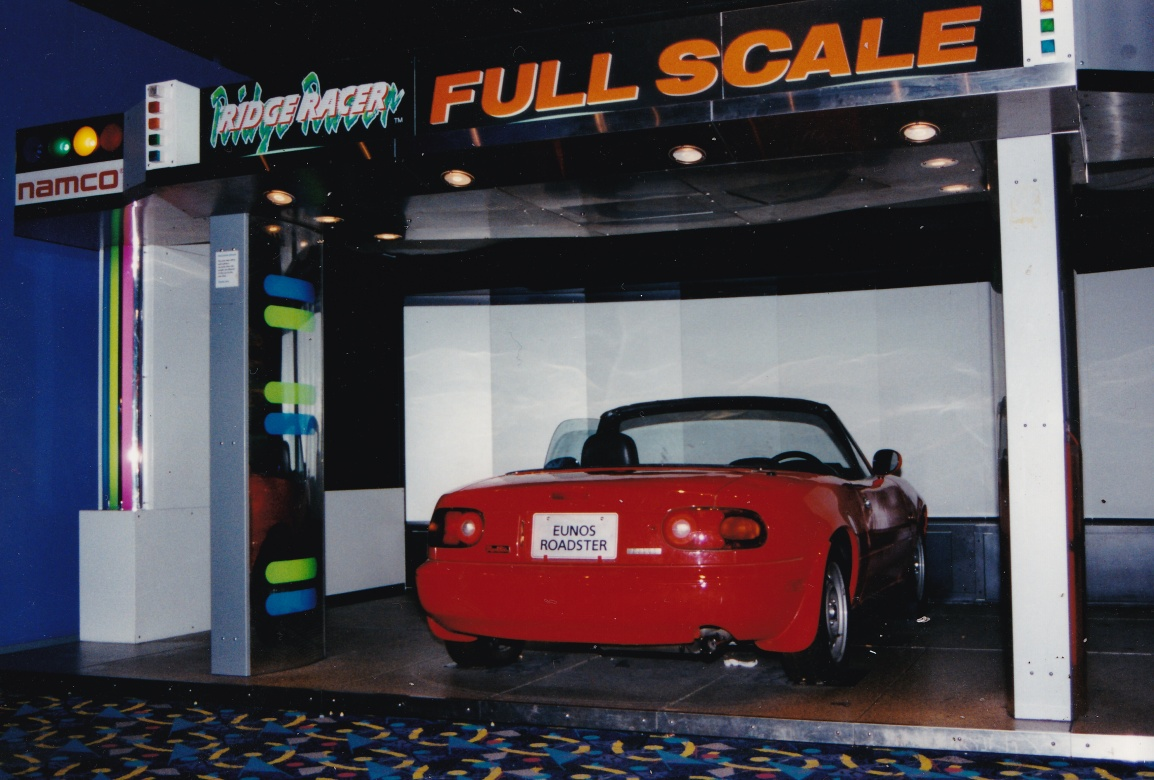
Ridge Racer Full Scale, an exceptionally-large deluxe cabinet that uses a full-scale Mazda MX-5 dashboard arrangement for the controls

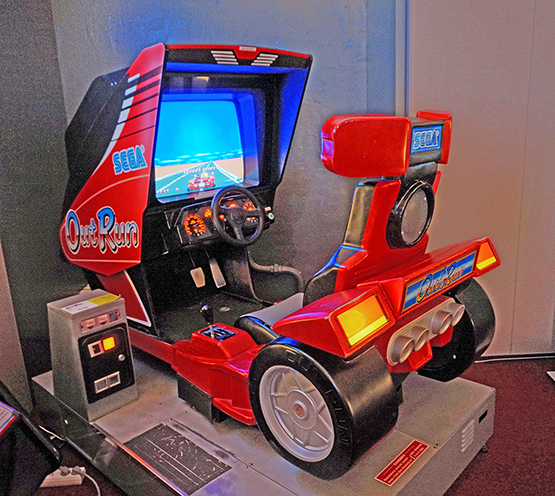
An older deluxe cabinet (Out Run)

Deluxe cabinets (also known as DX cabinets in Japan) are most commonly used for games involving gambling, long stints of gaming (such as fighting games), or vehicles (such as flight simulators and racing games). These cabinets typically have equipment resembling the controls of a vehicle (though some of them are merely large cabinets with features such as a large screen or chairs). Driving games may have a bucket seat, foot pedals, a stick shift, and even an ignition, while flight simulators may have a flight yoke or joystick, and motorcycle games handlebars, and a seat shaped like a full-size bike. Often, these cabinets are arranged side-by-side, to allow players to compete together. Sega is one of the biggest manufacturers of these kinds of cabinets, while Namco released Ridge Racer Full Scale, in which the player sits in a full-size Mazda MX-5 road car.

==== Cockpit or environmental cabinets ====
A cockpit or environmental cabinet is a type of deluxe cabinet where the player sits inside the cabinet itself. It also typically has an enclosure. Examples of this can be seen on the Killer List of Videogames, including shooter games such as Star Fire, Missile Command, SubRoc-3D, Star Wars, Astron Belt, Sinistar and Discs of Tron as well as racing games such as Monaco GP, Turbo and Pole Position. A number of cockpit/or environmental cabinets incorporate hydraulic motion simulation, as covered in the section below.

==== Motion simulator cabinets ====
A motion simulator cabinet is a type of deluxe cabinet that is very elaborate, including hydraulics which move the player according to the action on screen. In Japan, they are known as "taikan" games, with "taikan" meaning "body sensation" in Japanese. Sega is particularly known for these kinds of cabinets, with various types of sit-down and cockpit motion cabinets that Sega have been manufacturing since the 1980s. Namco was another major manufacturer of motion simulator cabinets.

Motorbike racing games since Sega's Hang-On have had the player sit on and move a motorbike replica to control the in-game actions (like a motion controller). Driving games since Sega's Out Run have had hydraulic motion simulator sit-down cabinets, while hydraulic motion simulator cockpit cabinets have been used for space combat games such as Sega's Space Tactics (1981) and Galaxy Force, rail shooters such as Space Harrier and Thunder Blade, and combat flight simulators such as After Burner and G-LOC: Air Battle. One of the most sophisticated motion simulator cabinets is Sega's R360, which simulates the full 360-degree rotation of an aircraft.

=== Mini or cabaret cabinets ===
Mini or cabaret cabinets are similar forms of arcade cabinet but are intended for different markets. Modern mini cabinets are sold directly to consumers and are not intended for commercial operation. They are styled just like a standard upright cabinet, often with full art and marquees, but are scaled down to more easily fit in a home environment or be used by children. The older form of mini or cabaret cabinets were marketed for commercial use and are no longer made. They were often thinner as well as shorter, lacked side art, and had smaller marquees and monitors. This reduced their cost, reduced their weight, made them better suited to locations with less space, and also made them less conspicuous in darker environments. In place of side art they were often clad in faux wood grain vinyl instead.

=== Countertop cabinets ===
Countertop or bartop cabinets are usually only large enough to house their monitors and control panels. They are often used for trivia and gambling-type games and are usually found installed on bars or tables in pubs and restaurants. These cabinets often have touchscreen controls instead of traditional push-button controls. They are also fairly popular with home use, as they can be placed upon a table or countertop.

=== Large-scale satellite machines ===
Usually found in Japan, these machines have multiple screens interconnected to one system, sometimes with one big screen in the middle. These also often feature the dispensation of different types of cards, either a smartcard in order to save stats and progress or trading cards used in the game.

== Conversion kit ==
An arcade conversion kit, also known as a software kit, is special equipment that can be installed into an arcade machine that changes the current game it plays into another one. For example, a conversion kit can be used to reconfigure an arcade machine designed to play one game so that it would play its sequel or update instead, such as from Street Fighter II: Champion Edition to Street Fighter II Turbo.

== Restoration ==
Since arcade games are becoming increasingly popular as collectibles, an entire niche industry has sprung up focused on arcade cabinet restoration. There are many websites (both commercial and hobbyist) and newsgroups devoted to arcade cabinet restoration. They are full of tips and advice on restoring games to mint condition.

=== Artwork ===
Often game cabinets were used to host a variety of games. Often after the cabinet's initial game was removed and replaced with another, the cabinet's side art was painted over (usually black) so that the cabinet would not misrepresent the game contained within. The side art was also painted over to hide damaged or faded artwork.

Of course, hobbyists prefer cabinets with original artwork in the best possible condition. Since machines with good quality art are hard to find, one of the first tasks is stripping any old artwork or paint from the cabinet. This is done with conventional chemical paint strippers or by sanding (preferences vary). Normally artwork cannot be preserved that has been painted over and is removed with any covering paint. New paint can be applied in any manner preferred (roller, brush, spray). Paint used is often just conventional paint with a finish matching the cabinet's original paint.

Many games had artwork that was silkscreened directly on the cabinets. Others used large decals for the side art. Some manufacturers produce replication artwork for popular classic games—each varying in quality. This side art can be applied over the new paint after it has dried. These appliques can be very large and must be carefully applied to avoid bubbles or wrinkles from developing. Spraying the surface with a slightly soapy water solution allows the artwork to be quickly repositioned if wrinkles or bubbles develop like in window tinting applications.

=== Control panels, bezels, marquees ===
Acquiring these pieces is harder than installing them. Many hobbyists trade these items via newsgroups or sites such as eBay (the same is true for side art). As with side art, some replication art shops also produce replication artwork for these pieces that is indistinguishable from the original. Some even surpass the originals in quality. Once these pieces are acquired, they usually snap right into place.

If the controls are worn and need replacing, if the game is popular, they can be easily obtained. Rarer game controls are harder to come by, but some shops stock replacement controls for classic arcade games. Some shops manufacture controls that are more robust than originals and fit a variety of machines. Installing them takes some experimentation for novices, but are usually not too difficult to place.

=== Monitors ===
While both use the same basic type of tube, raster monitors are easier to service than vector monitors, as the support circuitry is very similar to that which is used in CRT televisions and computer monitors, and is typically easy to adjust for color and brightness. On the other hand, vector monitors can be challenging or very costly to service, and some can no longer be repaired due to certain parts having been discontinued years ago. Even finding a drop-in replacement for a vector monitor is a challenge today, as few were produced after their heyday in the early 1980s. CRT replacement is possible, but the process of transferring the deflection yoke and other parts from one tube neck to the other also means a long process of positioning and adjusting the parts on the CRT for proper performance, a job that may prove too challenging for the typical amateur arcade collector. On the other hand, it may be possible to retrofit other monitor technologies to emulate vector graphics.

Some electronic components are stressed by the hot, cramped conditions inside a cabinet. Electrolytic capacitors dry out over time, and if a classic arcade cabinet is still using its original components, it may be near the end of its service life. A common step in refurbishing vintage electronics (of all types) is "recapping": replacing certain capacitors (and other parts) to restore, or ensure the continued safe operation of the monitor and power supplies. Because of the capacity and voltage ratings of these parts, it can be dangerous if not done properly, and should only be attempted by experienced hobbyists or professionals. If a monitor is broken, it may be easier to just source a drop-in replacement through coin-op machine distributors or parts suppliers.

=== Wiring ===
If a cabinet needs rewiring, some wiring kits are available over the Internet. An experienced hobbyist can usually solve most wiring problems through trial and error.

Many cabinets are converted to be used to host a game other than the original. In these cases, if both games conform to the JAMMA standard, the process is simple. Other conversions can be more difficult, but some manufacturers such as Nintendo have produced kits to ease the conversion process (Nintendo manufactured kits to convert a cabinet from Classic wiring to VS. wiring).

== See also ==
- Arcade controller
- Arcade game
- Slot machine
- Video arcade
- Arcade system board
- JAMMA
- MAME
