= Japan Amusement Machine and Marketing Association =

Japanese trade association headquartered in Tokyo

- 日本アミュ一ズメントマシン協会
- Pronunciation: Nihon Amyūzumento Mashin Kyōkai
- Formation: January 1981; 45 years ago
- Type: trade association
- Headquarters: Chiyoda, Tokyo, Japan
- Location: Japan
- Region served: Japan

The Japan Amusement Machine and Marketing Association (Japanese: 一般社団法人日本アミュ一ズメントマシン協会, Hepburn: Ippan Shadanhōjin Nihon Amyūzumento Mashin Kyōkai) (formerly the Japan Amusement Machinery Manufacturers Association (社団法人日本アミューズメントマシン工業協会, Shadanhōjin Nihon Amyūzumento Mashin Kōgyō Kyōkai), abbreviated JAMMA) is a Japanese trade association headquartered in Tokyo.

JAMMA is run by representatives from various arcade video game manufacturers, including Bandai Namco Entertainment, Sega, Taito, Koei Tecmo, Capcom, and Konami among others. Nintendo was also a member of the organization until its departure on February 28, 1989. Nichibutsu left in 1992 over content issues in their mahjong games.

The corporation was renamed on 1 April 2012 after they merged with the Nihon Shopping Center Amusement Park Operator's Association (NSA) and the Japan Amusement Park Equipment Association (JAPEA).

Before 2012, JAMMA had been organizing an annual trade fair called the Amusement Machine Show for many years. In 2013, they began collaborating with the Amusement Machine Operators' Union (AOU), who had their own trade show, to promote a new event: the Japan Amusement Expo.

== Arcade machine standards ==
=== Controllers ===
JAMMA is the namesake of a widely used wiring standard for arcade games. An arcade cabinet wired to JAMMA's specification can accept a motherboard for any JAMMA-compatible game. JAMMA introduced the standard in 1985; by the 1990s, most new arcade games were built to JAMMA specifications. As the majority of arcade games were designed in Japan at this time, JAMMA became the de facto standard internationally.

Before the JAMMA standard, most arcade PCBs, wiring harnesses, and power supplies were custom-built. When an old game became unprofitable, many arcade operators would rewire the cabinet and update the artwork in order to put different games in the cabinets. Reusing old cabinets made a lot of sense, and it was realized that the cabinets were a different market from the games themselves. The JAMMA standard allowed plug-and-play cabinets to be created (reducing the cost to arcade operators) where an unprofitable game could be replaced with another game by a simple swap of the game's PCB. This resulted in most arcade games in Japan (outside racing and gun shooting games that required deluxe cabinets) to be sold as conversion kits consisting of nothing more than a PCB, play instructions and an operator's manual.

The JAMMA standard uses a 56-pin edge connector on the board, with inputs and outputs common to most video games. These include power inputs (5 volts for the game and 12 volts for sound); inputs for two joysticks, each with three action buttons and one start button; analog RGB video output with negative composite sync; single-speaker sound output; and inputs for coin, service, test, and tilt.

The JAMMA connector has a .156" pin spacing edge connector (male on the game board) with other specifications based on number of pins.

20 pin, 36 pin, 44 pin, 56 pin and 72 pin connectors are available where the 56 pin JAMMA connector pinouts values are shown in the reference table and other game boards connectors may have different pinout values.

The connector circuitry of some later games, such as Street Fighter II: The World Warrior (1991) and X-Men (1992), implement extra buttons, different controller types, or support more players by adding extra connectors—or even by utilizing dormant JAMMA pins. Circuitry designs that overstep the JAMMA specification in this way are unofficially called JAMMA+.

=== Video ===
The JAMMA Video Standard (JAMMA VIDEO規格, JVS) is a newer JAMMA connector standard. The standard specifies a communication protocol based on RS-485 and physical interfaces for peripheral devices using commonly-available USB connectors and cables. JVS is incompatible with USB devices because it does not use the USB signaling standard and protocol.

Per the first edition of the JVS, published in 1996, peripheral devices connect to a dedicated I/O board. The main board connects to the I/O board via a USB Type-A to USB Type-B interface cable, and peripherals connect to the I/O board via USB-A connectors.

JAMMA published the second edition of the JVS on 17 July 1997, and the third edition on 31 May 2000. The third edition adds support for ASCII and Shift-JIS output; device drivers for secondary and tertiary input devices; a device driver for a mahjong controller; and recommended values for SYNC-code timing.

=== Similar technologies ===
Other manufacturers use similar edge connectors such as Tektronix for the TM50X, TM500X, 5000 and 7000 system mainframe equipment.

Connectors with similar designs have been used for different systems circuitry interfaces with 22 pins such as the Tektronix SC-503 extender, 26 pins 58900A Extender, 48 pins 5080-2843A Extender, 72 pins J-2306-01 Extender Board and others.

Some systems circuitry interfaces use special adapters that have been custom-made using the JAMMA connectors, such as with the Tektronix TM500/5000/7000 series extension cable adapters.

These different systems can be custom-built based on user requirements, where even basic guides have been created to assist users in the making of such adapters.

== See also ==
- Expansion card
- IEEE-488 (IEEE-488 GPIB or HPIB connectors)
- Micro ribbon connector
- Registered jack 21 (RJ21 Telco 50)
