= Big Bang Beat =

2007 video game

Big Bang Beat - 1st Impression -
- Screenshot of title screen.
- Developer: NRF
- Publisher: AliceSoft
- Platform: Microsoft Windows
- Release: JP: May 26, 2007
- Genre: 2D fighting game
- Modes: Multiplayer, Singleplayer

Big Bang Beat - 1st Impression - is a dōjin fighting game made by NRF based on the eroge Daibanchou: Big Bang Age by AliceSoft. Released in May 2007, the game borrows some elements from fighting games by Capcom and Arc System Works. In August 2011 the sequel Big Bang Beat - Revolve was released.

== Game Modes ==
Story Mode: The character goes through a series of random fights with two pre-determined mid-bosses. The final boss for every character is Devil Daigo and if beaten on a certain conditions on the opponents, you'll face Kamui as the secret final boss.

VS Hum: A quick 1-on-1 match with a human player.

VS Com: A quick 1-on-1 match with a computer-controlled opponent.

Survival Mode: An endurance run against randomly selected opponents which continues until the player is KO'ed.

Training Mode: Allows a player to practice moves against an opponent with customizable features.

Replay: Allows playback of a previously recorded fight.

Watch: A quick 1-on-1 match between two computer-controlled characters

Option: Allows various gameplay and minor system behaviors to be changed.

== Gameplay Mechanics ==
Ren Idagawa demonstrating a simple combo against Agito of the Dark

There are several key gameplay mechanics unique to Big Bang Beat:

P-Gauge: The P-Gauge is placed directly under the Health Bar, and monitors usage of special moves. Whenever a special move (or, in versions after 1.01, the strong attack) is used, this meter depletes. If a move would consume an amount of power that is greater than what is available, it cannot be performed. This meter automatically fills, or can be filled faster by using the game's "Charge" feature, which leaves the player vulnerable to attack. As the player loses health, the P-Gauge can "fill in" the empty parts of the Health Bar, thus allowing the player to use more specials if the Health Bar is low.

Attack Power Correction Value: Represented by a number near the center of the screen. When the P-Gauge is full, by holding the "Charge" button and rapidly pushing the directional buttons, the player can sacrifice health for increased damage from all of the character's attacks. The maximum value places attacks at 199% power and leaves the character with 1 health point.

B-Power Gauge: The game's "Super Bar." This bar is filled either by attacking the opponent or by picking up stones dropped by attacked opponents, known as "B Stones." When the number on the bar (called the "B-Power Stock") is 100 or higher, the player can execute one of several techniques that depend on this gauge:

- B Power Arts: The term for this game's "Super Moves." All B Power Arts cost 1 stock.
- B Dash: An advanced version of the character's Dash. It is much faster, and has the ability to cancel any move type, allowing for more combo opportunities. Costs 1 stock.
- B Counter: Activated by pushing the "B" button while blocking an opponent's attack. Allows the user to ignore block stun, and follow up with a counterattack. Costs 1 stock
- B Escape: Allows the player to escape being attacked. This drains a significant amount of power compared to the other movements above. Costs 4 stocks.
- Air Dash (1.01 only): In the first release, air dashing removed a small amount of B-Power. Every version thereafter borrows from the P-Gauge instead.
- Big Bang Break (1.02 on): A powerful move that can only be performed in character unique situations, usually by canceling a specific B Power Art with a special command. Costs two stocks.

An interesting note in this Gauge's history is that the first release had 9 levels of power, while every version after this only featured 5.

Enhance: Basically the equivalent of a taunt. Any character can use an enhance three times per fight at maximum, except for Heita who can use it six times. The effects of the enhance vary wildly from character to character, and can be as minuscule as damage tweaks to a single move (Ren) or transformation into a new character (Heita).

== Reception ==
Reviews have generally been mixed. Hardcore Gaming 101 states that the game is "one of the finest original 2D fighters in years", praising both its fluid animation quality and its gameplay. However, it has also had its share of criticisms. General complaints include a faulty fighting system that's easily exploited as well as updates to the game not addressing said problems and actually causes further problems.
