= ALL.Net =

Arcade game network system

- Developer: Sega Fave
- Type: Arcade video game network system
- Launched: June 30, 2004
- Platform: Arcade video game
- Status: Active
- Website: Aime service site (English); ALL.Net P-ras MULTI official site

ALL.Net (Amusement Linkage Live Network, and commonly pronounced as simply "all net" (オールネット)) launched on June 30, 2004 as an arcade video game network, and later a digital distribution system owned and operated by Sega Fave, a subsidiary of Sega Corporation. While owned by Sega, the service was announced as a joint partnership with Sammy (prior to merging with Sega) and Namco (now Bandai Namco).

The service facilitates network communication between machines and allows users to store play data, rankings, and unlockables to network user profiles. This data is registered to and accessed using arcade IC cards

At service launch, game-specific IC cards were used for registering user profile data. Sega introduced a unified IC card called Aime, and new games became compatible with it starting November 10, 2010. Bandai Namco introduced a unified IC card called Banapassport (now Bandai Namco Passport) on May 25, 2011. Since January 22, 2019, Sega's cards as well as those of competitors Bandai Namco, Konami, and Taito all use the Amusement IC standard. Data can be registered to and accessed using any Amusement IC card.

== History ==
=== Launch ===
Sega released Virtua Fighter 4 on August 1, 2001. It introduced an online network called "VF.NET", allowed players to create and access user profile data with IC cards, and had mobile phone connectivity with the i-mode service. Industry competitors, such as former Tekken series producer Katsuhiro Harada, point to this release being a turning point for the industry.

Later networked Sega arcade games used services tied to each individual game. Namco would not release a game using a game-specific network. On June 30, 2004, Sega, Sammy, and Namco announced and launched a new multi-game and publisher network known as ALL.Net. Some existing games were updated on that date to use ALL.Net, such as Virtua Fighter 4: Evolution, and all new titles would use it as well. On November 16, 2004, Namco launched Tekken 5. It used ALL.Net and became their first arcade game to use a network and IC card system. With this, existing services like VF.NET, and new services such as TEKKEN-NET for Tekken 5, all became a part of ALL.Net.

=== Arcade IC cards: Aime and Bandai Namco Passport ===
==== Game-specific IC cards ====
Sega introduced a system of registering profile data to game-specific IC cards with the release of Virtua Fighter 4 on August 1, 2001. This allowed players to maintain and track profile data, including scores, rankings, and unlockables between machines. Namco would introduce such functionality with Tekken 5.

==== Unified IC card introduction ====
Following those two releases, Sega and Bandai Namco games would use game-specific IC cards. On September 9, 2010, Sega announced the Aime (アイミー, Aimī) IC card as a unified replacement of all game-specific IC cards. Osaifu Keitai-compatible cell phones could also be used in lieu of a physical card, but no games were compatible with digital payments at the time. It was announced that it would support two of Sega's previously released games, Hatsune Miku: Project DIVA Arcade (初音ミク Project DIVA Arcade) and Sega Network Taisen Mahjong MJ4 Evolution (セガネットワーク対戦麻雀MJ4 Evolution, Sega Network Battle Mahjong MJ4 Evolution) on release. On November 10, 2010, Sega released the first new game that supported Aime, Sengoku Taisen -1560 Owari no Fuunji- (戦国大戦 -1560 尾張の風雲児-). Sega Network Taisen Mahjong MJ4 Evolution was compatible with Aime by Sengoku Taisen's launch. Aime support for Hatsune Miku: Project DIVA Arcade was added with the Version A update on January 27, 2011.

On May 25, 2011, Bandai Namco officially launched the Banapassport (バナパスポート) (now Bandai Namco Passport (バンダイナムコパスポート)) IC card as their unified replacement starting with the release of Dragon Ball: Zenkai Battle Royale (ドラゴンボール ZENKAIバトルロイヤル)

==== Cross-compatibility ====
Starting, November 1, 2011 Aime and Banapassport cards became cross-compatible. Of the then actively operating titles from both publishers, most were compatible with either card immediately. Dragon Ball: Zenkai Battle Royale became compatible with Aime cards starting November 2, 2011.

Sega, Bandai Namco, and Konami teamed up to introduce the Amusement IC standard. Starting October 25, 2018, cards from all three companies could be used with any game made by those companies, including Sega Sammy and Bandai Namco games using ALL.Net. Taito joined this standard on January 22, 2019.

==== Digital options ====
At launch, both Aime and Bandai Namco Passport supported Osaifu-Keitai and compatible cell phones could be used in lieu of a physical IC card. Using cell phones required the user to tap the card reader like they would a physical IC card.

However, on June 1, 2022, Bandai Namco terminated support for Osaifu-Keitai, requiring that users switch to physical cards. On August 25, 2026, Sega announced new Aime registrations using Osaifu-Keitai would cease on December 8, 2026. Existing users could continue to use it.

No app-based replacements were announced, unlike how Konami's e-amusement pass could be used from within their PASELI app starting July 15, 2025. Since using e-amusement pass via the app requires scanning QR codes generated by the game—as opposed to tapping the user's phone—it is not compatible with the Amusement IC standard.

=== Foreign Expansion ===
Initially, the service was only available in Japan.

By 2006, the service was available in the United States, with Sega pushing Extreme Hunting 2 Tournament Edition as the first game with nationwide online multiplayer thanks to it using ALL.Net.

A location test in Hong Kong began on April 17, 2008 with two titles, Sangokushi Taisen 2 (三国志大戦2) and Mobile Suit Gundam: Bonds of the Battlefield (機動戦士ガンダム 戦場の絆, Kidō Senshi Gundam: Senjō no Kizuna). By October 24, 2008, the service was widely available across parts of Asia with 29 arcades in Hong Kong, 34 in Taiwan, 1 in Shanghai (mainland China), and 13 in Singapore operating machines connected to ALL.Net.

On October 12, 2011, the service expanded to South Korea with the launch of Tekken Tag Tournament 2, which garnered controversy for requiring Bandai Namco's Banapassport IC cards and a network connection, contributing to a high purchase price.

As of 2024, maimai DX International serves as a prominent ALL.Net title in the US.

=== New service model: P-ras and P-ras MULTI ===
On July 12, 2006, Sega released Virtua Fighter 5. This would be the first title to support a new revenue share system called ALL.Net P-ras. So long as existing supported titles were connected to a server, any new titles could be purchased for no additional cost, and some of the proceeds from consumers would go to both the publisher and the arcade operator.

On February 17, 2012, Sega announced ALL.Net P-ras MULTI (APM) which introduced the following new features on top of the revenue share model:

- Revenue share would be extended to third-party publishers (outside of Sega Sammy and Bandai Namco)
- Operators would install games via DVD-ROM to the machine's internal storage. A new installation would replace the existing game

This followed Taito and Konami introducing similar systems, NESiCAxLive and e-amusement Participation respectively. The system launched on September 20, 2012 with two new games, Guilty Gear XX Accent Core Plus R and Under Night In-Birth.

On February 15, 2013, Sega announced APM version 2 (APM2) which introduced the following new features:

- Digital distribution would now be used to update existing titles and add new ones
- Multi-game machines were introduced. Any installed title could be selected from a menu

The system launched on March 14, 2013 with no new titles. On April 4, 2013, Mages released Phantom Breaker: Another Code (ファントムブレイカー アナザーコード) via the APM2 system, marking the first ever third-party game to use ALL.Net.

On April 18, 2019, Sega released APM version 3 (APM3) with the following features:

- Complete overhaul of the machine design
- The hardware was switched to the ALLS UX system and supports Unreal Engine 4
- A 32-inch touch-screen monitor
- USB controller support
- Digital payment support via the same card reader used for the Aime IC card
  - This follows Konami introducing PASELI as a digital payment platform in spring 2010. The system could be used for game credits instead of coins, and even supported PASELI alongside standard options
- USB charging
- 3.5 mm headphone jack support

Guilty Gear Xrd Rev 2 APM3 Edition and Puyo Puyo eSports Arcade (ぷよぷよ eスポーツ アーケード) were available at launch. By the launch of Virtua Fighter 5: Ultimate Showdown on APM3 on June 2, 2021, there were over 1,700 APM3 machines in over 500 locations across Japan.

== ALL.Net games ==
See List of ALL.Net games

== Service incidents ==
A picture of a maimai DX CiRCLE PLUS (left) and a Chunithm Mate (right) cabinet on November 1, 2026. The cabinets during that time had no connection to the server due to the cyberattack.

=== 2026 server cyberattack ===
At 3:00 p.m. Japan Standard Time (UTC+9) on November 1, 2026, all online games and services using ALL.Net were suspended for 'emergency maintenance', due to a cyberattack involving the unauthorized access of its servers.

Offline trial operation for Bandai Namco Experience titles in Japan resumed a week later on November 8. International models were not afftected by the outage.

Limited trial service for certain SEGA titles, both Japan and International models, has resumed on November 15, 2026 (UTC+9). More SEGA arcade titles, including maimai DX and Chunithm in Japan, have gradually resumed online services on November 21, 2026.

== See also ==
- Digital distribution in video games
- List of Sega arcade system boards
