= Mike Zaimont =

American video game designer

- Zaimont at Game Developers Conference 2011
- Occupations: Video game programmer; designer; director
- Years active: 2004 - Present

Michael "Mike" Zaimont, also known as Mike Z, is an American video game designer, programmer and director known for his work on fighting and action games such as Skullgirls and Indivisible.

== Career ==
Zaimont started his career in video game development in 2004 at Pandemic Studios as an intern on Star Wars: Battlefront before being promoted to a programmer on Battlefront II. He would continue to work at Pandemic until their dissolvement in 2009.

In his spare time, Zaimont would start work on an engine for a fighting game project. In 2008, Zaimont would meet artist Alex Ahad who had been working on various characters for a "hypothetical" fighting game project. Together the two would form a studio called Reverge Labs, later renamed to Lab Zero Games, and work on the project that would eventually release as Skullgirls in 2011. Ahad would be the game's main artist, while Zaimont would be the game's lead gameplay designer and programmer. Zaimont would cite some of his inspirations as Killer Instinct (1994), Marvel vs. Capcom 2 and the work of George Kamitani at Vanillaware.

In June 2020 while commentating during an official tournament, Zaimont would make a joke involving the phrase "I can't breathe," the last words of police brutality victim George Floyd less than two weeks after his murder. Zaimont would release an apologize on Twitter the same day, however staff at Lab Zero Games were still upset with his behavior. That same month on June 29, he would be accused of sexual harassment by two separate cosplayers. Much of the Lab Zero Games' staff would leave soon after, and claim that Zaimont frequently abused his power as head of the studio. After negotiations with the company's board of directors fell through, Zaimont moved to dismantle the board. By the end of August, any remaining employees at Lab Zero Games would be laid off by Zaimont. In September, much of the former employees would form a worker-owned studio under the name Future Games. The lawsuits regarding Zaimont's sexual harassment accusations would be settled in April 2026.

Zaimont continued to work in the game's industry at Maximum Games as the director for the 2024 title Diesel Legacy: The Brazen Age, and would work on Avatar Legends: The Fighting Game. Controversy would ignite regarding his continued employment.

== Ludography ==
Game Credits
Year	Game	Role	Ref(s)
2004	Star Wars: Battlefront	Production tester and intern	
2005	Star Wars: Battlefront II	Programmer	
2008	Mercenaries 2: World in Flames	Additional programming	
2009	The Lord of the Rings: Conquest	Combat designer	
2011	Street Fighter III: 3rd Strike Online Edition	Special thanks	
2013	Skullgirls	Design director, lead gameplay designer, lead programmer, voice actor for Tommy and Lorenzo	
2013	Killer Instinct	Additional programming	
2015	Guilty Gear XX Λ Core Plus R	GGPOZ engine creator	
2018	Them's Fighting Herds	Engine lead	
2019	Indivisible	Design director, programming, additional sound design	
2024	Diesel Legacy: The Brazen Age	Director	
2026	Avatar Legends: The Fighting Game	Combat engine director	
