= EAW =

EAW may refer to:

- Eastern Acoustic Works, an American manufacturer of audio tools
- Electrical Association for Women, a feminist and educational organisation founded in Great Britain in 1924 to promote the benefits of electricity in the home
- Elektro-Apparate-Werke, a former East German manufacturer
- Environment Agency Wales, a UK government agency responsible for environmental policy and control in Wales
- Equestria at War, a 2017 total conversion mod for the grand strategy video game Hearts of Iron IV
- European Arrest Warrant, an arrest warrant which is valid throughout the states of the European Union
- Expeditionary Air Wing, a Royal Air Force unit
- Extraordinary Attorney Woo, a 2022 South Korean legal drama
- Star Wars: Empire at War, a 2006 real-time strategy video game
