= Indivisible (video game) =

2019 video game

- Key artwork
- Developer: Lab Zero Games (Note: Dragon's Lake Entertainment co-developed the Switch version.)
- Publisher: 505 Games
- Directors: Mike Zaimont; Mariel Kinuko Cartwright
- Producer: Francesca Esquenazi
- Designer: Mike Zaimont
- Programmers: Cassandra Matthews; Robert Thomas; Mike Zaimont
- Artist: Mariel Kinuko Cartwright
- Writers: Mariel Kinuko Cartwright; Brandon Sheffield
- Composer: Hiroki Kikuta
- Platforms: Linux; macOS; Windows; PlayStation 4; Xbox One; Nintendo Switch
- Release: Linux, macOS, Windows, PlayStation 4, Xbox One: NA: October 8, 2019; PAL: October 11, 2019; Nintendo Switch: WW: April 28, 2020
- Genres: Action role-playing, platform
- Modes: Single-player, multiplayer

Indivisible is a 2019 action role-playing platform video game developed by Lab Zero Games and published by 505 Games. The game was initially released in October 2019 for Linux, macOS, Windows, PlayStation 4, and Xbox One and on April 28, 2020 for Nintendo Switch. It was released in Japan on July 16, 2020. A version for Amazon Luna was released on October 20, 2020, despite Lab Zero Games going defunct 11 days prior, thus discontinuing all additional content for the game. It was the final game to be developed by Lab Zero prior to their dissolution.

== Gameplay ==
Indivisible is an action RPG that combines platform-style exploration with combat mechanics inspired by Valkyrie Profile. The game features two distinct gameplay styles. In the overworld, players control Ajna, the main character, in a 2D action platformer format. Ajna can move left, right, and jump. As the game progresses, she learns new abilities and moves, allowing her to explore further and faster.

When encountering enemies in the overworld, the game seamlessly transitions to action RPG combat. Each character in the party is controlled using a specific button. Pressing a button moves the character toward the enemy for an attack. The order of button presses determines attack combos, and players can modify attacks by holding up or down on the analog stick or D-pad. Upgrades enable characters to attack multiple times.

Defensive options include blocking enemy attacks using the attack button for a specific character or blocking with the entire party. Additionally, a meter fills during battle, allowing players to unleash super attacks with their characters when it is full.

== Plot ==
The game begins with a battle between a group of warriors led by Indr (voiced by Keith Silverstein) and the malevolent goddess Kala (voiced by Anjali Bhimani). The battle ends with Kala being defeated and sealed on Mount Sumeru while Indr finds an abandoned baby they call Ajna (voiced by Tania Gunadi) and raises her as his own daughter.

16 years later, Ajna lives with her father in the village of Ashwat until it comes under attack by an army led by Dhar (voiced by Benjamin Diskin), who kills her father. After defeating Dhar, Ajna unexpectedly awakens a power in her that absorbs him into her mind, which houses a pocket dimension, and so she forces him to take her to his leader, the warlord Ravannavar (voiced by Michael Dorn), who ordered the attack. While gaining more companions and absorbing them into her mind, Ajna eventually confronts and chases Ravannavar to Mount Sumeru where she kills him, unaware that Ravannavar's intention was to use her power to unseal Kala, as Ajna is revealed to be a part of Kala that broke off following Kala's imprisonment and turned into the baby that Indr found, so that the goddess can destroy and recreate the world. Dhar defects to Ajna's side after learning that Ravannavar lied to him about wanting to create world peace.

After being cast out of Sumeru, Ajna and her companions are rescued by the Deva Thorani (voiced by Zehra Fazal), who guides her to the nearby port, where she meets Angwu (voiced by Laura Patalano) a former member of Indr's party who instructs Ajna to look for three chakra gates around the world and activate them so that she can increase her power in preparation to face Kala in battle. Throughout her journey, she encounters various foes who threaten the lands with the chakra gates. After doing so, Ajna returns to Sumeru despite being warned by her friends that she might not be ready yet due to her earlier reckless actions, and while facing Kala, she loses herself to anger, becoming a monster that causes massive destruction. With her friends unable to get through to her, Dhar sacrifices himself to stop her.

One week later, Ajna recovers and, after seeing the error of her ways (actually revealed to have been caused by Kala's influence on her), becomes determined to atone for her mistakes. She travels the world again to regroup with some of her friends, while helping to solve some problems she unwillingly caused during her previous journey and learns that her former foes have also been influenced by Kala, and returns to Sumeru for a final battle with Kala. In the occasion, Ajna bids farewell to her companions and convinces Kala to give up on destroying the world; the two merging together and disappearing.

In the post credits, an image of a merged Ajna and Kala is seen in an unknown location, living a new life.

== Development ==
Indivisible was developed by Lab Zero Games, which consisted of members best known for the 2012 fighting game Skullgirls. Lab Zero Games announced Indivisible during their Skullgirls panel at the Anime Expo on July 2, 2015. According to the developer, the game's storyline was influenced by southeast Asian mythology and other cultures. It also features 2D hand-drawn animation by Lab Zero Games' artists. Composer Hiroki Kikuta, best known for his work on Secret of Mana, scored the game's soundtrack. The game features animation by Japanese anime studio Trigger and American animation studio Titmouse, Inc., with the opening animation directed by Yoh Yoshinari of Little Witch Academia.

Lab Zero Games launched a crowdfunding campaign on Indiegogo on October 5, 2015, with a goal of US$1,500,000. A playable prototype of the game was released in tandem with the launch. If Lab Zero Games met or exceeded their goal, publisher 505 Games would contribute their remaining development budget. The campaign's initial 40-day contribution period faced relatively sluggish fundraising, earning approximately $764,000 by November 8, 2015. However, on November 13, 2015, the campaign was extended for an additional 20 days after the game received roughly US$963,000 in pledges, above Indiegogo's required 60% threshold. Following the extension, the goal was eventually reached on December 2, 2015. The game was released on October 8, 2019 in North America and released three days later in Europe.

The game was surprise-released on Nintendo Switch on April 28, 2020, without any input from Lab Zero Games. The Switch version was launched with missing features that were added through updates, such as co-operative play and New Game+ mode. This was due to the game accidentally being launched on its original planned release date, rather than being delayed to early May 2020 as was intended.

On October 9, 2020, 505 Games announced the cancellation of all future updates and content for Indivisible following the dissolution of Lab Zero Games. The final update for the Nintendo Switch version was released on October 13, 2020, with an Amazon Luna port of the game being released on the 20th.

Cancelled downloadable content included several guest characters such as Shovel Knight, Red from Transistor, Annie from fellow Lab Zero game Skullgirls (which, unlike Indivisible, continued getting further updates through Hidden Variable Studios and Future Club), the Drifter from Hyper Light Drifter, and Shantae, among others, which were announced in early November 2015.

== Scrapped animated series adaptation ==
On July 17, 2020, it was announced that an animated adaptation of Indivisible was in development for the Peacock streaming service, with Meg LeFauve and Jonathan Fernandez as writers and executive producers. The series was to be produced by DJ2 Entertainment and Legendary Television. The status of the series is currently unknown due to the closure of Lab Zero Games though it is assumed to be scrapped.

== Reception ==
Reception

Aggregate score
Aggregator	Score
Metacritic	PC: 78/100; PS4: 77/100; XONE: 82/100; NS: 79/100

Review scores
Publication	Score
Computer Games Magazine	9/10
Destructoid	7/10
Edge	6/10
Game Informer	7/10
GameRevolution	3.5/5
GameSpot	8.8/10
IGN	8.8/10
Jeuxvideo.com	16/20
Nintendo Life	7/10
Nintendo World Report	8/10
PlayStation Official Magazine – UK	7/10
PC Gamer (US)	75/100
RPGamer	3.5/5
RPGFan	85%
Shacknews	9/10
USgamer	4/5

Indivisible received "generally favorable reviews" according to Metacritic.

Joe Juba of Game Informer praised the game's art style, animation, music and combat but criticized the backtracking and some other issues with the combat.

=== Accolades ===
The game was nominated for "Character Design" and "Game, Original Role Playing" at the NAVGTR Awards.
