= Autumn Games =

American video game publisher

- Type: Video game publisher
- Industry: Video games
- Founded: 2007
- Founder: Alex Collmer and Jason Donnell
- Headquarters: New York, New York
- Products: Console, PC, mobile and social games
- Services: Marketing, publishing and distribution
- Website: autumngames.com

Autumn Games is an American video game publisher based in New York City. The company was founded by Alex Collmer and Jason Donnell in 2007 with institutional sponsorship from Communications Equity Associates and Autumn Entertainment Partners.

The company's first video game was Def Jam Rapstar, which was nominated for awards in the annual Spike Video Game Awards. The game was co-published by Autumn Games and Konami Digital Entertainment. Def Jam Rapstar was the result of a several-year publishing arrangement between Autumn Games and 4mm Games.

In November 2011, the company released its second game, developed by Isopod Labs. The game was a collaboration with Jimmie Johnson named Jimmie Johnson's Anything with an Engine.

Autumn Games had a publishing partnership with Famous Games.

Autumn Games partnered with Reverge Labs to publish the 2D fighting game Skullgirls. Skullgirls was released on Xbox Live Arcade and PlayStation Network in April 2012. The game was later released in Japan on the PlayStation Network in February 2013.
