= Q (Street Fighter) =

Playable Street Fighter character

- Street Fighter character
- Q in Street Fighter III: 3rd Strike
- First game: Street Fighter III: 3rd Strike (1999)
- Designed by: Hiroshi Shibaki
- Voiced by: Len Carlson

Q is a character from Capcom's Street Fighter fighting game series.

== Conception and design ==
When working on the Capcom fighting game Street Fighter III: 3rd Strike, development of Q had started after Chun-Li and Makoto. When developing his character they wanted him to be robotic and feel "like it's being manipulated from behind the scenes". Character designer Hiroshi Shibaki was initially unsure how to approach the character, and worked with others on the development team to figure out his details. Early versions were intended to be a handsome, regular man. Q was purposefully made as a mysterious character with no intended answers as to who he actually was.

Thought Q's exact height is never stated, he is established as one of the tallest characters in Street Fighter III. His outfit consists of a brown trenchcoat, matching fedora with a red band, white gloves, black pants, and black shoes. Under his jacket he wears a white shirt and a tie. His face is covered by a metal mask which has two glowing robotic yellow eyes, and is locked to his head by a keyhole on the left hand side where the ear should be. Design notes for his character stated that he should feel emotionless and robotic, while also feeling like he's "being manipulated from behind the scenes".

== Appearances ==
Q is an enigmatic figure who first appeared in the 1999 Capcom fighting game Street Fighter III: 3rd Strike. Voiced by Len Carlson, he travels the world fighting strong opponents for unknown reasons, and is currently being investigated by groups such as the C.I.A. He also acts as an optional boss for the game's arcade mode, challenging the player if the proper conditions are met. Outside of his appearance in 3rd Strike, the SNK vs. Capcom: Card Fighters series also features him as an available card, as does GungHo Online Entertainment's mobile game TEPPEN.

== Promotion and reception ==
To support the release of 3rd Strike's Online Edition, player avatar items of the character were released for Sony's PlayStation Network. For Street Fighter 6, costume items based on Q's appearance for the game's "World Tour" mode were added for players to use on their custom characters. A stationary miniature was also released by Jasco Games, as part of a Street Fighter III character pack.

Since his debut, Q was mostly well received. Paul Furfari of UGO.com stated that while Q was not a standout design among the Street Fighter III cast, but when compared to those from the rest of the franchise "he's an oddity with a vocal fan base". Furfari added that while player perception of the character could vary greatly, Q had a unique fighting style that was both brutal and clumsy, able to deal significant damage in the hands of a patient player. On the other hand, game developer David Sirlin cited Q alongside the character Twelve in his pitch for a fourth Street Fighter game as examples of how newer characters had failed to resonate with audiences. Sirlin felt that a continuation of the series should focus on popular legacy characters.

Suriel Vazquez and Eric Van Allen of Paste stated that little was known about the character, and that in itself made him interesting. Pointing out how theories about the character being present in previous Street Fighter titles due to how little was known about him, they felt his mystery alluded to bigger things in the series. They added that the curiosity around him is what helped make him so appealing, and stated that in "a series filled with comical stereotypes and eccentric fighters, an enigmatic masked detective is sure to be a welcome change of pace".

Ian Walker in his own article for Paste suggested that while the questions around Q made him a fan favorite and a compelling character, they also implied an aspect of creepiness from how his gameplay was portrayed. Elaborating, he pointed out how in his introduction crowds appear to be actively running away from him, while his body moves in a robotic, jerky fashion. Meanwhile, in the few instances he shows emotion he appeared to refer to himself as an abomination and shed a tear for fallen opponents. Walker noted that given the lack of information from the developers it was tempting to make assumptions regarding the character, and often these theories could lead to dark assumptions on just how much free will Q had. He closed by stated players would likely never get answers regarding the character, and in that way "Q is all the more macabre for it."

=== Analysis of design and gameplay ===
Q's design has been compared to K, protagonist of the show Robot Detective

Journalist John Learned in his YouTube series examining the characters of Street Fighter III stated that Q was clearly made to be an enigma, with parts of his outfit acting as cultural signifiers of film noir men of mystery in a similar way to DC Comics character Question. He further pointed out that fans had also noted similarities between Q's design and the protagonist of tokusatsu show Robot Detective K, an android detective with a similar mask that is also referenced in an easter egg in Q's ending. But even with this in mind, he pointed out Q was purposefully left vague, with even supplemental media offering little details, and even the notion of multiple Qs being a possibility.

In a later podcast with Retronauts, Learned described Q as "a slower, moving brick wall Balrog", referencing the Street Fighter II boxer in that both characters featured rushing attacks of different angles. Co-commentator Shivam Bhatt stated while Q was just fine, he saw him as "one of those gimmick characters" the development team "happened to need". Learned added that he felt Q an interesting concept that didn't really pan out other than to be referenced by G later on in Street Fighter V. Host Diamond Feit stated he was always drawn to weird characters like Q and played him heavily on the Dreamcast port of 3rd Strike, and Learned stated that while he personally loved the character, he understood that Q was not for everyone.

While Gavin Jasper of Den of Geek emphasized the mystery around the character, he stated Q was also a "creepy, menacing, hard-hitting tank not to be messed with". He pointed out that the character had various ticks and quirks in how he moved and fought that made him "easy to be enthralled with", and expressed his wish that Capcom would use him in another title. Destructoid community manager "Occams Electric Toothbrush" shared similar sentiments, calling Q the best character in the franchise due to how his appearance begged the question "What are you?" Describing Q as a cross between a Japanese businessman robot and tokusatsu hero Ultraman, he appreciated his fighting style of pure brute force without finesse, while his mannerism and jerky movements fit what one would expect from his appearance. He added that everything about the character was fun in his eyes, and while he noted Q was not innately cool or imposing like fellow characters Ryu and Alex respectively, "He's strange and I appreciate strange".
