= Legends of Equestria =

2017 video game

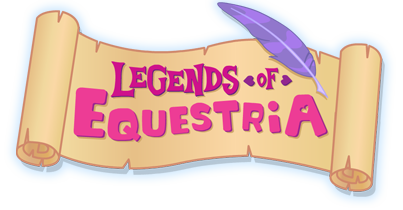
- Developer: Legends of Equestria Team
- Engine: Unity
- Platforms: Microsoft Windows; macOS; Linux; Android; iOS
- Release: September 9, 2017: macOS, Linux, Windows; September 9, 2017; Android; August 12, 2021; iOS; April 11, 2022
- Genre: Massively multiplayer online role-playing game
- Mode: Multiplayer

Legends of Equestria is a 2017 fan-made free-to-play indie massively multiplayer online role-playing game (MMORPG) based on the animated television series My Little Pony: Friendship is Magic. The game was released for Microsoft Windows, macOS, and Linux on September 9, 2017. It was also ported to Android in August 2021 and iOS in April 2022.

== History ==
Legends of Equestria began development as a fan project for the My Little Pony: Friendship Is Magic fandom by an international team of volunteers. The game launched its early access release on August 19, 2017 after five years in development, which included the first story arc, with plans for continued development and content expansion post-launch.

In April 2024, the development team announced the closure of the European server (Europonia).

== Gameplay ==
Legends of Equestria is a family-friendly MMORPG that emphasizes socialization, exploration, and customization over traditional combat mechanics. The game features a talent system that allows players to choose from various skill sets including magic, herbalism, mining, cooking, and partying. When combat does occur, players can use non-violent objects like apples, cakes, pies, and horseshoes. Players can customize their pony characters with various options including mane and tail styles and colors, race, gender, body color, eye color, accessories, and pre-designed cutie marks.

== See also ==
- Equestria at War
- Them's Fightin' Herds
