= Fightcade =

Software client used in video games

- Developers: Pau "Pof" Oliva; Papasi
- Final release: 0.42 / September 1, 2015; 10 years ago
- Operating system: Microsoft Windows, macOS, Linux
- Type: Freeware
- License: Non-commercial
- Website: www.fightcade.com

Fightcade is a software client used to enable online play for various arcade and home console systems through emulation. Fightcade utilizes networking middleware GGPO to mitigate the effects of network latency on gameplay, and functions as a successor of GGPO's now-defunct matchmaking client.

== History ==
GGPO, the networking middleware which Fightcade uses for facilitating online play, was created by Tony Cannon in response to the poorly-received netcode of the 2006 Xbox 360 re-release of Street Fighter II: Hyper Fighting. GGPO was originally bundled with a client that enabled users to play networked multiplayer games via an embedded emulator. The GGPO client supported a wide variety of popular arcade games, such as Street Fighter II, King of Fighters, and Metal Slug.

Pau "Pof" Oliva, one of Fightcade's major contributors, noted that the GGPO client often suffered from intermittent service, sometimes going offline for several days at a time. Expressing concern over the future of GGPO, Oliva began work on Fightcade during a prolonged GGPO service outage. Oliva originally intended to only use the Fightcade client amongst friends, but positive reception from beta testers encouraged him to publicly release the client.

Fightcade launched into beta in late 2014, during a period where other contemporary netplay clients were noted to be largely unsupported by their creators, suffering from either lengthy outages or financial distress. Following the discontinuation of the GGPO client, Fightcade now functions as the GGPO client's de facto successor.

A significant portion of Fightcade's functionality was developed through reverse-engineering GGPO's client; Fightcade would go on to inherit many of the GGPO client's features. New features exclusive to Fightcade were also implemented, such as network hole punching, which forgoes the need to port forward when connecting to other users, and replays, which enable users to re-watch their game matches at a later time.

In October 2017, Fightcade 2.0 was released through a limited public beta. Features added in 2.0 include an overhauled GUI and an updated version of the bundled emulator, which enables Fightcade to support a broader range of arcade and console hardware.

== Design ==
Fightcade contains several built-in emulators, which it uses to run supported games. GGPO is utilized for online multiplayer play, affording Fightcade the same "rollback" lag mitigation techniques present in GGPO's original client.

The software client supports a large variety of arcade hardware, including many Capcom boards (CPS-1, CPS-2, CPS-3), the Neo Geo and the Sega NAOMI. With the release of Fightcade 2.0, Fightcade added support for several home consoles such as the Sega Genesis, TurboGrafx-16, Super NES and Dreamcast.

Although the software is free, players must acquire and install the ROM files themselves. This is done for legal reasons, as while the concept of emulation is perfectly legal, the necessary files are usually downloaded without permission from the copyright owner, which is a form of online piracy.
