= Twelve (Street Fighter) =

Playable Street Fighter character

- Street Fighter series character
- Twelve in Street Fighter III: 3rd Strike.
- First game: Street Fighter III: 3rd Strike (1999)
- Voiced by: Lawrence Bayne

In-universe information
- Origin: Mediterranean
- Fighting style: Hyper adaptation

Twelve (トゥエルヴ, Tueruvu) is a character from the Street Fighter fighting game series.

== Conception and design ==
When creating Twelve for Street Fighter III: 3rd Strike, the development team aimed for a character that was "deliberately weird and atypical", with his design meant to break the rules they had established for the series. Early concepts of his appearance portrayed a bald hunched-over man with a harness on his torso and shorts on his lower body, while his body would have had camouflage patterns. His role in the game was primarily meant to flesh out other characters, and intended to be a "perfected" version of Necro, a character introduced earlier in the series that had been experimented on to be a bioweapon. Initial designs were intended to have him be able to change his face, but the finalized design instead gave him a move to mimic his opponent entirely.

Standing 172 centimetres (5 ft 7 1/2 in) tall, Twelve's default appearance is as a milky-white male human. Beyond a muscled physique, his body is generally smooth and featureless, save for his head which resembles a helmet with black, featureless eyes. His lower jaw is thin and sets under the faceplate area of his head and lacks teeth. Twelve features long, thin hands, which he often turns into various weapons to attack with for a fighting style described as "Hyper adaptation". His design was meant to have simple coloring while they focused on making his movement and animation interesting.

In Street Fighter V, a precursor to Twelve, Eleven, was introduced. Resembling Twelve but with a finned head, instead of being a fully playable character it will transform into a random fighter from the game before the match. Series director Takayuki Nakamura had wanted to include a "random" character in the game since the start, and the development team had wanted to initially use Twelve and his transformation move for his purpose but were unable to, so they instead created a new character for the role. The shape of Twelve's head meanwhile was inspired by another Capcom character, Leafman, who they had previously introduced in their mobile game Otoranger.

== Appearances ==
Twelve is a mutated humanoid from the Mediterranean who first appeared in the fighting game Street Fighter III: 3rd Strike, and is the first of a series of mass-produced models of the same kind. A living bioweapon created by Gill's Illuminati, he was created to be a stronger version of the character Necro. Twelve's body is fluid and capable of shape shifting into various forms or generating weapons from his limbs. While his memories are reset after each mission, unknown to his creators he is steadily becoming self aware. Twelve speaks in binary code, and his original mission was to recapture Necro and Effie for the Illuminati. Twelve is voiced by Lawrence Bayne.

Several attacks were considered that were never implemented such as being able to swim on the ground, while another would have let him spray poison mist from his mouth.

== Promotion and reception ==
To support the release of 3rd Strike's Online Edition, player avatar items of the character were released for Sony's PlayStation Network.

Twelve was poorly received upon debut, and is often considered the worst character in Street Fighter III. Gavin Jasper of Den of Geek praised how beautifully the character was animated, stating the "T-1000 sperm creature is a wonder to look at". However the praise ended there, as he felt Twelve blended into the background of the game due to lacking personality, and any "creepiness" factor that could have been afforded it was done better by another character in the game, Q. By comparison, he felt Twelve was handled better in the UDON comics, describing his role in the story as a neat surprise. Meanwhile, game developer David Sirlin cited him alongside Q in his pitch for a fourth Street Fighter game as examples of how newer characters had failed to resonate with audiences, and felt a continuation of the series should focus on popular legacy characters.

Suriel Vazquez and Eric Van Allen of Paste considered him the strangest character of Street Fighter III cast, a game they felt was already full of strange characters. Elaborating, they stated that Twelve oozed novelty in a way that made him feel more like a character from Capcom's Darkstalkers franchise than Street Fighter with his use of tentacles and flying maneuvers. However said novelty was short lived as the most memorable part of the character ended up being his transformation ability. Further calling him unfun to play, they stated that while Twelve had the beginnings of a good idea, he was ultimately "an enigma who’s just not very alluring to figure out".

On the other hand, journalist Steve Hendershot in the book Undisputed Street Fighter described Twelve as "one of the great aesthetic successes of Street Fighter III. He considered watching Twelve be able to change its arms into various weapons a joy to watch in game, though acknowledged that many of his attacks were not as potent as one would like. Furthermore he praised X.C.O.P.Y. as the real fun of the character, emphasizing how it was not only a great visual effect, but also allowed players to demonstrate their mastery of the game's roster. Hendershot also echoed Jasper's earlier praise of how Twelve was used in the comics, citing UDON comics writer Siu-Chong's statement on how it elevated X.C.O.P.Y. from a cool gameplay element to a helpful narrative one.

=== Analysis of gameplay and themes ===
Shivam Bhatt on Retronauts's podcast stated that while Twelve had similarities to Necro, he played "weird", with host Diamond Feit added "in a game of weirdos, he's the even weirder one". Bhatt went further to describe him as a milky-white kind of blob with an odd combination of attacks, particularly his ability to turn invisible. Commentator John Learned meanwhile felt the character had been imported from the Marvel vs. Capcom series, incorporating air dashing and aerial mobility in a way he found interesting but contributed to how the character felt unfinished. They however considered X.C.O.P.Y. a neat concept, with Bhatt comparing it to the Mortal Kombat character Shang Tsung in how it enabled messing with opponents during matches.
