= Makoto Tsumura =

Japanese voice actress (born 1965)

- 津村 まこと
- Born: Yumie Tsumura (津村 由美枝); July 22, 1965 (age 61); Hokkaidō, Japan
- Occupation: Voice actress
- Years active: 1990–present
- Agent: Aoni Production
- Height: 157 cm (5 ft 2 in)

Makoto Tsumura (津村 まこと, Tsumura Makoto; born July 22, 1965 as Yumie Tsumura (津村 由美枝, Tsumura Yumie)) is a Japanese voice actress. She entered a training school attached to Ezaki Productions in 1991 and belonged to Mausu Promotion (formerly Ezaki Productions) from 1993 to 2007. After leaving Mausu, she worked as a freelancer from 2007 to September 2008. Later, she worked for D-Color from October 2008 to September 2013, and Aksent from October 2013 to November 2018, before joining Aoni Production in December 2018.

Tsumura took over the role of Atom from Mari Shimizu for the 2003 Astro Boy television series, and since 2005, has been voicing the role of Wakame Isono in the long-running Fuji TV television anime series Sazae-san, succeeding Michiko Nomura.

== Filmography ==
=== Television animation ===
- Astro Boy (2003) (Astro Boy)
- Digimon Tamers (Takato Matsuda)
- Digimon Ghost Game (Monmon)

Unknown date

- Arc the Lad (Boy (A))
- Beet the Vandel Buster (Nakku)
- Bleach (Shibata Yūichi)
- Captain Tsubasa Road to 2002 (Mitsuru Sano, Kazuki Sorimachi, Rivaul's Son)
- Demashita! Powerpuff Girls Z (Gomma)
- Diamond Daydreams (Haruto Eizawa)
- Dokkiri Doctor (Gen Genda, Male Student)
- Fullmetal Alchemist (Selim Bradley)
- Ghost Stories (Leo Kakinoki)
- Goldfish Warning! (Shuuichi Kitada)
- Hello Kitty: Ringo no Mori to Parallel Town (Henry)
- Hikaru no Go (Kimihiro Tsutsui)
- Idaten Jump (Kakeru Sakamaki)
- Inukami! (Tomekichi)
- Kamichu! (Shōkichi Hitotsubashi)
- Naruto (Kimimaro (young))
- Paradise Kiss (Suguru Hayasaka)
- Paranoia Agent (Shogo Ushiyama)
- Pokémon (Tsubasa, Burūsu Chan, Saburō)
  - Pokémon: Advanced Generation (Marshtomp, Poochyena, Azurill, others)
  - Pokémon: Diamond & Pearl (Ayako, Chimchar, Shinx, others)
- Sazae-san (Wakame Isono (third voice))
- Shaman King (Elly)
- Uninhabited Planet Survive! (Beru (child))
- Viewtiful Joe (Captain Blue Junior)

=== Theatrical animation ===
- Tsubasa Chronicle the Movie: The Princess of the Country of Birdcages (xxxx) (Koruri)

=== Video games ===
- Astro Boy (2004) (Astro Boy)
- Bravely Default (xxxx) (Airy)
- Night Trap (Japanese dub, xxxx) (Cindy)
- Onimusha series (xxxx) (Yumemaru)
- Sakura Taisen V Episode 0 ~Kouya no Samurai Musume~ (xxxx) (Chesana Cycles)
- Street Fighter III: 3rd Strike - Fight for the Future (1999) (Makoto)
- Super Street Fighter IV (2010) (Makoto)
- Ratchet & Clank series (Japanese dub, xxxx) (Ratchet)
- Sonic and the Black Knight (xxxx) (Merlina)
- PlayStation All-Stars Battle Royale (Japanese dub, xxxx) (Ratchet)

=== Dubbing roles ===
==== Live-action ====
- Aliens (2004 TV Asahi edition) (Newt (Carrie Henn))
- Annie: A Royal Adventure! (Colin Norris (Sam Stockman))
- Apollo 13 (Jeffrey (Miko Hughes))
- Asteroid (1997 TV Asahi edition) (Elliot McKee)
- The Blue Lagoon (2015 Wowow edition) (Young Richard (Glenn Kohan))
- Cube (Joan Leaven (Nicole de Boer))
- Dr. Dolittle (John Dolittle (young))
- East of Eden (Lee Dong-chul (5 years old) (Shin Dong-woo))
- ER (Alex)
- Face/Off (Jamie Archer)
- Firewall (Andy Stanfield (Jimmy Bennett))
- Goosebumps (The Barking Ghost) (Cooper)
- Hancock (Aaron Embrey (Jae Head))
- Hotel for Dogs (Bruce (Jake T. Austin))
- John Q. (2007 NTV edition) (Mike Archibald)
- The Kite Runner (Young Amir)
- Knowing (Young Lucinda Embry / Abby Wayland (Lara Robinson))
- Nanny McPhee and the Big Bang (Megan "Megsie" Green (Lil Woods))
- The Sixth Sense (Bobby)
- Unfaithful (2006 TV Asahi edition) (Charlie Sumner (Erik Per Sullivan))

==== Animation ====
- ChalkZone (Rudy)
- Foster's Home for Imaginary Friends (Mac)
- Ned's Newt (Ned)
- PB&J Otter (Peanut)
- Ratchet & Clank (Ratchet)
- Rugrats In Paris (Kimi Watanabe-Finster)
- Rugrats Go Wild (Kimi Watanabe-Finster)
- Winter Sonata Anime (Kong Jin-Sook)
