= Remy (Street Fighter) =

Playable Street Fighter character

- Street Fighter character
- Remy in Street Fighter III: 3rd Strike
- First game: Street Fighter III: 3rd Strike (1999)
- Voiced by: Eiji Sekiguchi

In-universe information
- Origin: France
- Nationality: French
- Fighting style: Savate

Remy (レミー, Remī) is a character from Capcom's Street Fighter fighting game series.

== Conception and design ==
When developing 3rd Strike, the development team felt the game was missing something and decided they needed to include a handsome male character, particular one that fit the Japanese bikei trope, something that they felt Capcom was not particularly known for. His character designer put together a wide variety of concepts, creating 40-50 character designs which included a doctor, a priest, a prince, and a monster all in that aesthetic, with the priest concept being one of the final designs they considered. Early design traits for his character described him as a "genius that looks down on others" and "cool but with a feminine side".

Standing 173 centimetres (5 ft 8 in) tall, Remy is a slim man with long turquoise colored hair that often covers his right eye. His outfit consists of red pants, matching shoes and belt, and a zipped up black jacket with the Greek letter omega emblazoned on the upper chest across the zipper. Remy was intended to be a hardcore martial artist in the same vein was fellow characters Alex and Ryu. In terms of gameplay, several ideas were also considered in this regard, before deciding on a character that would use attacks that required to be charged first. While Remy was added late in development, the team was happy his character was able to be completed.

Amongst the multiple character designs considered during Remy's development was a young man with multiple personalities and a Shadaloo symbol on the back of his jacket, referencing the criminal organization ran by Street Fighter II villain M. Bison. This particular iteration of Remy's design would have also been able to poison enemies with his hands. When developing Street Fighter V, Capcom recycled many of these ideas from this concept to create the character F.A.N.G.

== Appearances ==
Remy is a young French man introduced in the 1999 Capcom fighting game Street Fighter III: 3rd Strike. Seeking revenge on his father for abandoning him, he extends rage towards all martial artists. Driven insane by the death of his sister, he encased her body in ice to preserve her body, keeping it secluded in an underwater cave. By the game's conclusion he realizes despite the battles he feels no different. Putting his sister at rest, he puts his past behind him and feels peace for the first time. In 3rd Strike, he is voiced by Eiji Sekiguchi. In other games, the SNK vs. Capcom: Card Fighters series also features him as an available card, as does GungHo Online Entertainment's mobile game TEPPEN.

Remy fights using Savate, a form of French boxing.

== Promotion and reception ==
To support the release of 3rd Strike's Online Edition, player avatar items of the character were released for Sony's PlayStation Network. For Street Fighter 6, costume items based on Remy's appearance for the game's "World Tour" mode were added for players to use on their custom characters.

Since his debut, reception for Remy has been divisive and mostly negative. In particular, he has often been compared to Guile, a character with similar attacks introduced in Street Fighter II. He has often been singled out as one character heavily disliked from the Street Fighter III cast, with Nicholas Tan of GameRevolution stating that while he'd welcome the return of any of the others "Remy can just stay on the sidelines forever as far as I'm concerned". At the same, other media outlets have requested to see the character return in more recent Street Fighter releases as they felt he would fit the aesthetic of the modern series, with Jahanzeb Khan feeling in particular he fit the darker art direction of Street Fighter V and "pulls off his offense with more grace and finesse" than Guile.

Gavin Jasper of Den of Geek described him as "a Guile-like replacement who is bitter and nobody really cares", feeling that nobody cared that his story was left unresolved. Paste attributed his absence in later Street Fighter titles to how similar his gameplay was to Guile, stating that while the concept in the game was unique it was not done well, voicing additional dislike for his personality. In another article for the site, he was described as "deliberately designed to evoke the late ‘90s Hot Topic aesthetic" while lacking the timelessness that made much of Street Fighter's cast memorable.

Video game journalist Drew Mackie in an article for his website Thrilling Tales of Old Video Games drew a parallel between Remy and Final Fantasy VII character Vincent Valentine, in that both characters had someone they cared about hidden in a submerged cave. He suggested the both concepts may be a homage to Saint Seiya, more specifically the character Cygnus Hyoga's relationship with his mother. In the series, his mother's body is lost at sea and becomes frozen at the bottom of the ocean, with Hyoga training his body to reach her preserved corpse. Hyoga's fixation his mother comes across as oedipal, and in this way he pointed out how both characters have an illicit undertone with their own lovers, complete with a resolution of letting them go to achieve greater power.

=== Design analysis ===
Shivam Bhatt on Retronauts's podcast described Remy as "bishonen Guile", criticizing his gameplay as lackluster but heavily praising his animation and design. Host Diamond Feit stated that he felt the character was more of a knockoff of SNK character Iori Yagami, something that Bhatt also agreed with. However, Feit added that was before he realized that fighting games were often going to have the "beautiful man" type of character, and felt Capcom was less creating a copy of Iori but moreso a copy of the same sort of character style. They touched upon the fact that of 3rd Strike's cast he was the last character added and how disconnected he felt with the game itself, while also acknowledging how the series itself had appeared to forget him by not referencing him since.

Gaming journalist John Learned in his YouTube series examining Street Fighter characters stated that Remy "wasn't designed to be bad, but in a way he was". He felt that the development team were trying to repeat their success with the characters Yun and Yang Lee in the previous games by "willing a character into popularity", particularly in their focus on a beautiful man archetype which felt was in response to seeing how other franchises had seen success with similar characters, such as Castlevania's Alucard and Final Fantasy's Squall Leonhart. He observed that even the character's name lent to this, being a French unisex name meaning "oar", which further fit into the ice and water theme demonstrated in his character story and attacks.

In an article for The Michigan Daily discussing the portrayal of LGBTQ and adjacent characters in fighting games, Ariel Litwak felt Remy filled a gap for androgynous characters in the franchise, acting as a visual design foil for series characters Ryu and Alex. She further compared the character to SNK's Ash Crimson in that both representing a trope of "gender-nonconformity signifying non-heroism", in that while neither were villains both characters were shown as rivals of their respective series' protagonists while generally antagonistic towards them.
