= 4mm Games =

American video game development company

4mm Games, LLC
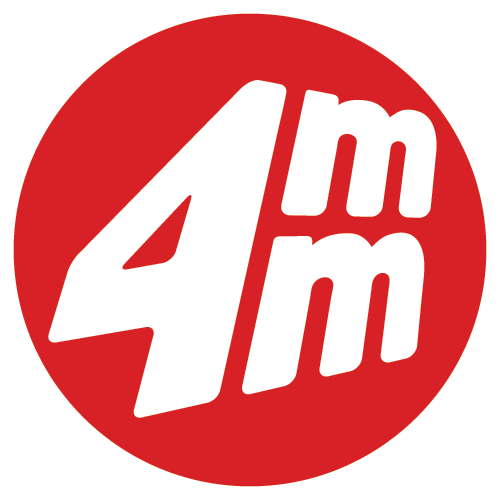
- Type: Private
- Industry: Video games
- Founded: 2008; 18 years ago
- Defunct: 2012
- Fate: Dissolved
- Headquarters: New York City, New York, U.S.
- Key people: Jamie King, Gary Foreman, Nicholas Perrett, Paul Coyne
- Products: Def Jam Rapstar; Dog Show Friends; Alli Skate

4mm Games, LLC was a New York-based video game development company founded in 2008 by two founders of Rockstar Games, Jamie King and Gary Foreman along with former Image Metrics executive Nicholas Perrett, and Def Jam Enterprises, Warner Music Group and NBC executive Paul Coyne. OBE and former NCSoft CEO Geoff Heath was a member of the advisory board and offered strategic input.

The company released the Terminal Reality developed and Konami / Autumn Games published the hip-hop music game Def Jam Rapstar on October 5, 2010, in North America and November 26, 2010, in Europe for the PlayStation 3, Nintendo Wii, and Xbox 360.

4mm Games released Dog Show Friends, a Facebook social game based on The National Dog Show presented by Purina in conjunction with NBC Sports on November 24, 2010.

The company was working with Alli, the Alliance of Action Sports, to create new digital titles based on the organization's events. The plan was to release games based on sports such as snowboarding, skateboarding and motocross, as well as Alli tournaments such as the Dew Tour, Gatorade Free Flow Tour and Winter Dew Tour. According to 4mm, the games would have provided both "bite sized and fully immersive game play experiences" and would be released on a range of platforms, including mobiles, smartphones, TV, and web browser. The first of these games was to have been a free-to-play browser-based skateboarding game called Alli Skate.

== Closure ==
The release of Def Jam Rapstar was lukewarm and a year later the web portal burned through available funds and was closed without warning. 4mm founder Jamie King later stated in an interview that the problem was that they became too ambitious and that he wished they had "either pushed the game back and made it for Kinect or [had it] come out a year earlier." 4mm continued to work on other projects such as an experiment with UK game developer Jagex, which Jamie King, Gary Foreman and Nick Perrett subsequently joined in May 2011 to form a new holding company working on multiple Jagex titles, including the core Runescape franchise. However, on March 31, 2012, EMI Music Group filed a suit against 4mm and Terminal Reality. The suit claims that the game uses 54 unlicensed tracks that EMI values at $150,000 each. On May 15, 2012, GameIndustry held an interview with King who stated that 4mm was on-hold. One of the reasons King cited was the ongoing lawsuit with EMI. Two months later, City National Bank sued Konami and Autumn Games for $8.9 million over a $15 million line of credit it approved for the game's development.
