= Makoto (Street Fighter) =

Street Fighter character

- Street Fighter character
- Makoto in Street Fighter III
- First appearance: Street Fighter III: 3rd Strike (1999)
- Designed by: Keigo Chimoto
- Voiced by: EN: Jessica D. Stone (Street Fighter IV); JA: Makoto Tsumura

In-universe information
- Fighting style: Rindoukan Karate
- Origin: Japan
- Nationality: Japanese

Makoto (Japanese: まこと) is a character in Capcom's Street Fighter fighting game series, designed by Keigo Chimoto and first appearing in 1999's Street Fighter III: 3rd Strike. In the series, she is a young Japanese woman who utilizes her family's dojo teachings of Rindo-kan karate as her fighting style, seeking to restore glory to her deceased father's dojo. She has since appeared in UDON Entertainment's Street Fighter comic series, and due to her overwhelming popularity was included in Street Fighter IV's first upgrade, Super Street Fighter IV. Makoto is voiced by Makoto Tsumura in Japanese for both of her appearances, and Jessica D. Stone in English for Street Fighter IV.

The character has been positively received, in both location tests for the original game and a later official poll in which she placed second out of all the characters. Particularly, the staff of 1UP.com declared her as one of the key reasons they prefer 3rd Strike over the preceding Street Fighter III titles. Several outlets have declared her their favorite character in the franchise, and others have praised her design and character heavily in contrast of other series characters.

== Conception and design ==
Designed as a "masculine, fierce hot headed girl", the direction they took with Makoto caused significant discussion amongst the team.

During development of Street Fighter III: 2nd Impact, the development team was tasked to create a character based around the karate concept of ikken hissatsu, which they summed up as "simple, direct and powerful". Feeling other Street Fighter characters Ryu and Ken use a more "American" form of karate, they focused on Makoto having a more Japanese style, with a secondary focus to illustrate her determination to fix up her rundown dojo. Designed by Keigo Chimoto, Developer Hidetoshi Ishizawa noted that due to them running out of time to properly implement her, they were unable to add her to 2nd Impact before release and instead added her to its followup title, Street Fighter III: Third Strike. Chimoto would later praise Ishizawa's "ability to adjust", feeling it benefited her development. In order to give a "hot-blooded" tone to her character, her dialogue in-game is spoken with a Japanese Tosa dialect.

Makoto stands 160 centimetres (5 ft 3 in) and has measurements of 80-61-87 cm (32-24-34 in). During development many designs were proposed with a guideline to include a loose fitting karate gi though the amount of the outfit sometimes varied drastically from one design to the next. The gi was intended to be the oversized and loose fitting on her due to it being her deceased father's. According to the book All About Capcom Fighting Games 1987-2000, due to her behavior and attire she is commonly confused by players to be "Ryu's little sister". Her finalized design consists of a barefoot muscular woman with short black hair wearing a white loose gi, a red halter top underneath her gi resting at her cleavage, a long flowing yellow ribbon around her neck. The ribbon in particular was added by 3rd Strike's development team to demonstrate her speed and trajectory, as well as telegraph to the opponent certain moves Makoto performs.

Years later, she was included in Street Fighter IV's first upgrade, Super Street Fighter IV. Game director Taisaku Okada attributed her appearances in the game to her wide popularity at Street Fighter III tournaments, and his own desire to include characters from that franchise. While her outfit was carried over to game, so was the behavior of her neck ribbon, which necessitated the development team to create new code to handle the 'flutter' effect. The development team had some difficulty pinpointing her character's appeal, feeling that her "feminine cuteness" and outfit were rather plain. Producer Yoshinori Ono felt that her appeal lied in the "exhilaration" she expressed when landing an attack, and focused particularly on her animations to convey this element. In the game, she was also given four alternate outfits in the game, including a gardening outfit with gloves and apron and a schoolgirl outfit with a bandaged thigh, none of these retained the ribbon and were noted in developer comments as particularly hard to design. Her dialect also caused issues, causing Capcom to hire a professional in country dialects to oversee the sound recording team. This resulted in countless retakes, and the development team expressed their gratitude to her voice actor for not giving up.

== Appearances ==
Makoto was introduced in the 1999 video game Street Fighter III: 3rd Strike, inheriting her father's Rindōkan karate dojo which has fallen into disrepair and lost students. She enters the game's tournament to showcase and spread word of her fighting style, and by the conclusion of her story many people travel to try and join her dojo, much to the delight of her family. In Street Fighter IV, a precursor to Street Fighter III, she discovers the rundown state of the dojo, and after reading about the Worldwide Fighting Tournament, decides to enter to use the prize money and repair it. However Makoto walks away with nothing due to the tournament secretly being a trap by its organizer, and while repairing the dojo she considers making a name for herself may bring students, leading to her story in 3rd Strike. In all appearances, Makoto's Japanese voice is provided by Makoto Tsumura, while Jessica D. Stone provides her English voice for Street Fighter IV.

Outside of fighting games, she is an available character Capcom's mobile game Street Fighter Battle Combination as well as TOPJOY's mobile role-playing game Street Fighter: Duel, the latter of which features an alternate version called "Kimono Makoto" exclusive to the Chinese version. The SNK vs. Capcom: Card Fighters series also features her as an available card, as does GungHo Online Entertainment's mobile game TEPPEN. In physical trading card media she appears in Versus TCG, a card game based on Card Fighters' Clash, and Jasco Games' Universal Fighting System.

In print media, Makoto is featured in UDON Entertainment's Street Fighter comic series, in which she is first introduced in issue eleven of Street Fighter II Turbo as the heir to her father's fighting dojo. Abandoned by his former students due to her age and gender, she challenges other dojos to try and restore glory to her own. She later appears in UDON's Street Fighter Legends: Ibuki series, attending a school as a new student and immediately declares her intention to fight anyone to demonstrate the superiority of her fighting style. After discovering another student, Ibuki, is a martial artist she challenges her, though they later come to an arrangement to postpone the fight after Makoto discovers she is a ninja and trying to keep it a secret. Afterwards Ibuki helps keep Makoto in line while the latter helps train the former. After helping her fight off a rival ninja clan, Makoto requests they have their duel and the comic ends as the two begin to spar. In Street Fighter Unlimited, both her and Ibuki are invited to self-proclaimed god Gill's fighting tournament, joining in on an impromptu dance party prior to said tournament. After Gill reveals himself to be a villain, she fights alongside the other participants to take him down. She later appears in a smaller role in the Street Fighter: Back to School Special comic, in which after wrestling with fellow Street Fighter III character Elena, they ponder what college to attend.

=== Gameplay ===
Described as a rushdown character, Makoto's gameplay revolves around closing the distance between herself and the opponent and quickly delivering fast blows. According to Capcom developers, unlike other characters in Street Fighter III she lacked the ability to produce large combos, forcing the player to consider each move and making it harder for beginners to use her. Her walking speed is slower than average, however to compensate her dashes are faster and farther while several of her moves give her forward momentum, specifically her "Hayate" attack which consists of a high speed dashing punch that allows her to cross a large part of the screen instantly and can be followed up with another attack if it connects. Her "Karakusa" grab attack is unique, in that unlike other grabs instead of instantly knocking down the opponent it leaves them standing a moment, allowing for a follow up attack. The developers noted an intention to reference actual karate techniques with her gameplay, something that caused some difficulty for the development team.

The development team for Street Fighter IV commented that characters from III were harder to implement due to that game's parry system, a game mechanic that allows the user to negate an attack and counterattack in a brief window, which is not present in IV. This was particularly problematic in the case of Makoto. Moves such as her "Tanden Renki", a power up super attack that greatly increases her strength for a short period of time, but prevents her from being able to block attacks when using it had to be modified, allowing her to block attacks while reducing the increase in the strength of the power up. Several other moves were also changed with the intention of giving her more variety, such as her anti-air attack "Fukiage" which now has her stepping forward in all variations of the move and allows for easier follow up attacks. However, the lack of parry in the game leaves her more vulnerable to projectile attacks, something that Okada did by design and feels makes her a harder character for beginners to use.

== Promotion and reception ==
Capcom noted Makoto as the most popular character in location tests of 3rd Strike in both North America and Japan, and in their 2018 worldwide poll, she was voted second most popular Street Fighter character. She has been also featured through many figures and other merchandise items, such as a bust by F-Toys to celebrate the 15th Anniversary of the Street Fighter series. A stationary miniature was also released by Jasco Games, as part of a Street Fighter III character pack. Meanwhile, to support the release of 3rd Strike's Online Edition player avatar items of the character were released for Sony's PlayStation Network.

Makoto was met with mostly positive reception. Martin Robinson of IGN described her as one of a handful of characters worth salvaging from Street Fighter III, adding that it was not until her introduction that "Capcom's bold vision for its prize series found its real star," and called her possibly his favorite character from the whole series. The staff of 1UP.com, in their Retronauts podcast, heavily emphasized Makoto's inclusion in 3rd Strike as one of the game's best aspects, with Ryan Scott stating "You have some weird characters, then you have characters like Makoto, who are basically like...this is pure Street Fighter right here." The other hosts agreed, with Jeremy Parish stating it was one of the reasons people preferred the game over the preceding Street Fighter III titles.

Further praise was given to her personality and storyline. Suriel Vazquez and Eric Van Allen of Paste stated her "brash, intense fighting style perfectly suits a teenager trying to make her mark on the world", comparing her to fellow Street Fighter character Sakura in that regard. They further described Makoto as her polar opposite due to her being "someone who dreams not of finding a mentor and emulating them, but of forging her own path", adding that her story was "as motivating as Ryu's globe-trotting adventures, and it doesn't get the play it deserves in the series' storyline." Den of Geek's Gavin Jasper however felt that when her fighting style was removed from consideration she was somewhat tame compared to the rest of the Street Fighter III cast, stating unlike the other characters she was just "a girl in a karate gi", and in regards to her storyline "at the end of the day, she's like Dan played straight(er), and that doesn't measure up."

In terms of gender representation, Becky Chambers and Amanda LaPergola of The Mary Sue both heavily praised Makoto for her story in light of how other women in the series were often portrayed as obsessed with finding romance, with LaPergola stating "I will forgive Street Fighter III all its flaws because they introduced Makoto to the world." Chambers in turn complimented her practical outfit, with LaPergola stating she felt that Makoto was an exception to how many female characters in Street Fighter were designed for the male gaze thanks to the masculine aspects of her appearance. Meanwhile, in a dissertation given at the SBGames simposium in Brazil, Tiago Oviedo Frosi and Felipe O. Frosi examined how Makoto's character design deviated from how female characters were often depicted in fighting games while portraying karate accurately. In their view while she still projected aspects of "the ideal woman", she also reflected traits of the Nio, figures in Buddhist religion, through her prominent hands and feet. While the authors emphasized that these aspects were often more common in masculine characters, they felt Capcom had avoided the "athlete's 'compromise of femininity'" through her poses and how her karate gi illustrated her developed abdomen and breasts, presenting her in a sensual manner.
