= Skullgirls =

2D fighting video game

- Developer: Reverge Labs (Note: Post-release content developed by Lab Zero Games (2014–2019), Hidden Variable Studios (2020–2025), and Future Club. Arcade version developed by M2. Skullgirls Mobile developed by Hidden Variable Studios.)
- Publisher: Autumn Games (Note: Initially distributed by Konami before Autumn Games eventually took on self-distribution. Published by CyberFront in Japan. PC version previously published by Marvelous. Arcade version published by M2. 2nd Encore published by Arc System Works in Japan. Nintendo Switch version published by Skybound Games. Skullgirls Mobile originally published by Line.)
- Designers: Mike Zaimont (2012–2019); Peter Bartholow
- Programmer: Mike Zaimont (2012–2019)
- Artists: Alex Ahad; Mariel Kinuko Cartwright; Jonathan Kim; Brian Jun
- Composers: Michiru Yamane; Vincent Diamante; Brenton Kossak; Blaine McGurty
- Platforms: PlayStation 3; Xbox 360; Microsoft Windows; PlayStation 4; Arcade; PlayStation Vita; Linux; OS X; Android; iOS; Nintendo Switch; Xbox One; Xbox Series X/S
- Release: April 10, 2012: Skullgirls; PlayStation 3; NA: April 10, 2012; EU/AU: May 2, 2012 Xbox 360; WW: April 11, 2012 Microsoft Windows; WW: August 22, 2013; Skullgirls Encore; PlayStation 3; NA: February 11, 2014; EU/AU: March 19, 2014; JP: July 15, 2014 Windows, Xbox 360; WW: April 22, 2014; Skullgirls 2nd Encore; PlayStation 4; NA: July 7, 2015; EU/AU: July 23, 2015; JP: April 14, 2016 Arcade; JP: October 29, 2015 PlayStation Vita; WW: April 5, 2016; EU/JP: April 14, 2016 Linux, Windows, OS X; WW: April 13, 2016 Nintendo Switch; WW: October 22, 2019 Xbox One, Series X/S; WW: July 19, 2023; Skullgirls Mobile; Android, iOS; WW: May 25, 2017
- Genre: Fighting
- Modes: Single-player, multiplayer
- Arcade system: Taito Type X²

Skullgirls is a 2012 fighting video game developed by Reverge Labs and published by Autumn Games, originally released digitally for PlayStation 3 and Xbox 360 and ported to various other home and portable systems afterwards. A 2D fighter, Skullgirls consist of team-based fights and revolves around the "Skull Heart", an artifact which grants wishes for women. If a wisher with an impure soul uses the Skull Heart, she is transformed into a monster known as the "Skullgirl".

The game was initially released through the PlayStation Network and Xbox Live Arcade platforms, and received generally positive reviews from critics, who praised the animation and gameplay mechanics, while criticizing its initial roster size and online multiplayer features. The game was then ported to Windows, released through the Steam platform, before a dispute between Autumn Games and distributor Konami led to its removal from the console storefronts; it was re-released on both platforms in 2014 as Skullgirls Encore, before a PlayStation 4 port and a version for Japanese arcades under the retitled name Skullgirls 2nd Encore in 2015. It has since been ported to other platforms including PlayStation Vita, Nintendo Switch, Xbox One and Xbox Series X/S. A spin-off mobile title was released in 2017 for Android and iOS, developed by Hidden Variable Studios.

Development of Skullgirls 2nd Encore continues in the form of downloadable content. After Skullgirls's initial release, the core team of Reverge Labs reformed as Lab Zero Games and developed the game until its dissolution in 2020, with several of its members forming another indie studio, Future Club, who have been the Skullgirls developers since.

== Gameplay ==
Beowulf (right) fights against Valentine (left) in a two-on-three tag team battle. Skullgirls allows players to use differently sized teams.

Skullgirls is a tag team-based fighting game in which players control characters, each with unique attacks and fighting styles, to engage in combat. Players must damage the opponent and completely drain their health, thus knocking them out. A player wins when all opposing characters are knocked out. If time expires before then, the player with the most remaining health is declared the winner. Players may select a single fighter or choose to form a team of two or three. A solo character possesses more health and deals more damage. Larger teams, while weaker, gain the ability to recover health when tagged out and perform "assists", also known as "ensemble attacks", where the on-screen character summons an off-screen teammate to perform a move. Players can assign custom assists in Skullgirls, further enhancing team customization.

The gameplay for Skullgirls was modeled after Marvel vs. Capcom 2: New Age of Heroes, incorporating the latter's tag team mechanics, assists, and control scheme. The control scheme utilizes six buttons, consisting of light, medium, and hard punches and kicks. These basic attacks can be chained together to form simple combos. Using a combination of button presses and directional inputs, players can also perform "special attacks", which are slightly stronger than normal moves, and "blockbusters", which are cinematic super moves that deal heavy damage and can hit multiple times. Blockbusters require players to build and expend meter, known in-game as "dramatic tension". As the fight progresses, the players' dramatic tension gauge will fill. Up to five bars of dramatic tension can be stored, with more powerful blockbusters requiring more bars of tension to execute. Dramatic tension can also be used to perform other universal techniques, such as "outtakes", which force the opponent to switch characters, and "blockbuster sequels", which allow the player to use multiple blockbusters consecutively.

Skullgirls includes technical features to address system and balance problems common in fighting games, such as "infinite combo" detection and protection against "unblockable attacks". Infinite combos occur when a player is able to create a repeating, inescapable loop of attacks as an exploit. When the game detects an infinite combo through monitoring a player's actions, the opposing player can break free from it by hitting any button. Unblockable attacks occur when a player, for example, uses a low-hitting move and a high-hitting assist at the same time, making it impossible for the opponent to block. The game attempts to remedy the issue by offering a brief grace period after blocking which will guard against other hit types.

=== Modes ===
Skullgirls has a variety of single-player and multiplayer game modes, including story mode, arcade mode, versus mode, tutorial mode, training mode, and online play. The story mode features small, non-canonical vignettes for each playable character, detailing "what if" scenarios playing out across alternate timelines. A canonical story mode has been teased, however, with the developers citing the inclusion of downloadable content (DLC) characters from the first season pass as necessary to tell their "true" story. The arcade mode lets players fight against waves of AI-controlled opponents before reaching the final boss character, Marie. The tutorials section teaches players the gameplay fundamentals of Skullgirls, in addition to covering concepts underlying the fighting game genre as a whole. Seventeen tutorial courses are available, explaining both basic and advanced topics. The training room gives players the opportunity to practice combos against an AI-controlled dummy, as well as access to advanced data, such as hitboxes. The training room was later updated in Skullgirls Encore to include online functionality, allowing players to practice with friends instead. Online multiplayer features ranked and unranked matches using the GGPO networking library, providing a smoother online experience.

Skullgirls Encore added "The Typing of the Skullgirls", a mode inspired by The Typing of the Dead. When enabled, teams automatically generate dramatic tension and all basic attacks deal negligible damage. Blockbusters give timed typing prompts to the player, awarding damage for typing accuracy. Skullgirls 2nd Encore introduced several new game modes, including challenge mode, where players fight against computer opponents under unique battle conditions; trials mode, which tests players' skills by having them perform combos under a button-by-button instructional system; and survival mode, which pits players against endless waves of enemies.

== Setting ==
Skullgirls takes place in the fictional Canopy Kingdom, a country reminiscent of 1940s post-World War II United States, which is ruled by the Renoir royal family and plagued by the Medici mafia. The kingdom is populated by humans, anthropomorphic animals, giants, and other species. Magical items, creatures, and entities exist that grant their users and hosts various superhuman abilities, such as "Parasites" and "Living Weapons". A large part of the kingdom follows the religion of the Trinity, a trio of extraterrestrial goddesses consisting of Venus, Aeon, and their mysterious Mother. Numerous individuals and organizations seek to obtain the Skull Heart, a sentient artifact with reality-warping powers created by the Trinity. The Skull Heart appears once every seven years and grants a woman a single wish. If the woman's wish is impure, she is transformed into an undead monster known as the Skullgirl. The Skullgirl and Skull Heart are devices used by the Trinity to wreak havoc on the world. Humanity has fought against many Skullgirls over the course of history, establishing agencies to build weapons to confront them, the most notable of which is Canopy Kingdom's Anti-Skullgirl Labs, a black-ops research institution spearheaded by the scientist Brain Drain.

During the Grand War, a battle fought between the Canopy Kingdom and two neighboring nations, Queen Nancy Renoir nearly brought the world to ruin when she attempted to use the Skull Heart for the sake of peace. The three countries formed an alliance to bring down the Skullgirl, signing a peace treaty thereafter. Seven years later, a slave girl named Marie Korbel has emerged as the newest Skullgirl and begun to terrorize the Canopy Kingdom to exact revenge against the Medici. The game's story mode follows several fighters and their journeys to confront Marie and claim the Skull Heart. Each fighter has their own motive for seeking the Skull Heart, whether to destroy it or use its power for their own interests.

=== Characters ===
The Skullgirls roster initially consisted of eight playable characters: Filia, Cerebella, Peacock, Parasoul, Ms. Fortune, Painwheel, Valentine, and Double. Following the conclusion of the game's Indiegogo crowdfunding campaign in 2013, an additional five DLC characters were developed: Squigly, Big Band, Eliza, Beowulf, and Robo-Fortune. In 2014, a clone of Filia, named Fukua, was added in a free update. Fukua reuses assets from Filia and was designed as a nod to palette-swapped characters in fighting games. She was originally intended to be a temporary inclusion for April Fools' Day, but was kept in response to fan feedback. From 2021 through 2023, four more playable fighters were released as part of the Season 1 Pass: Annie, Umbrella, Black Dahlia, and Marie.

== Development ==
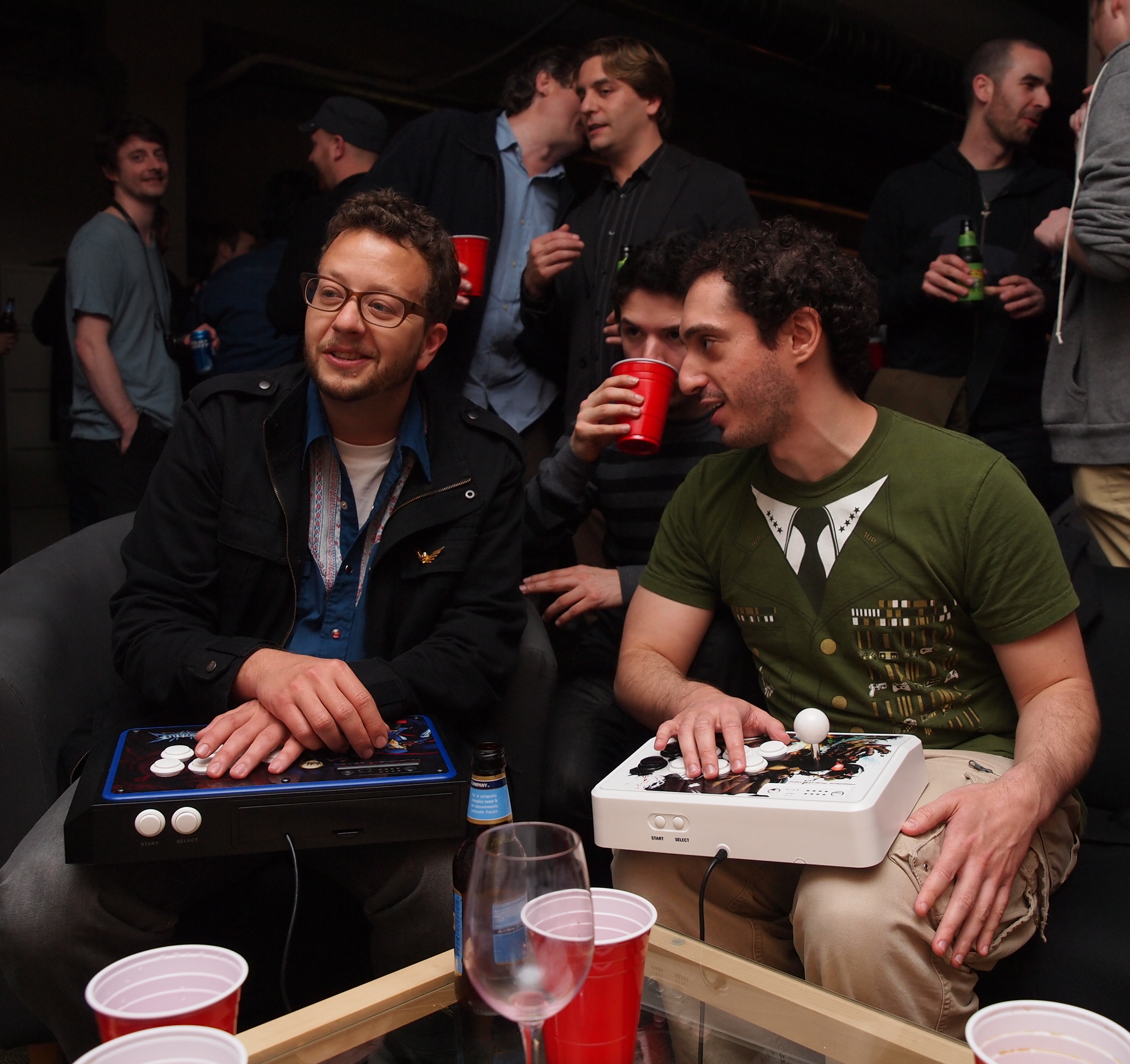
Mike Zaimont (right) discussing Skullgirls with EVO-organizer Seth Killian in 2011

Skullgirls was originally conceived as several stray character designs that illustrator Alex "o_8" Ahad had been creating since high school. While attending college, Ahad had the hypothetical idea to use the character concepts for a fighting game roster. The idea would later become a reality when Ahad was introduced to fighting game enthusiast and tournament-goer Mike "Mike Z" Zaimont, who had been working on a fighting game engine during his own spare time. Early work on their new Skullgirls project began in 2008. Engine development and pre-production began in 2009. Ahad drew the art style and character designs based on a wide variety of his influences and inspirations, such as the works of Mike Mignola and Bruce Timm, Gainax's FLCL, Tex Avery's Red Hot Riding Hood, Capcom's Darkstalkers, and artists George Kamitani and Daisuke Ishiwatari. Ahad and Zaimont pitched Skullgirls to several companies, eventually teaming up with recently founded independent developer Reverge Labs in 2010. They later went on to sign with publisher Autumn Games. In April 2011, Reverge Labs licensed OtterUI as its user interface solution for the development of Skullgirls. At the Electronic Entertainment Expo 2011, Japanese developer and publisher Konami announced that they would help distribute the game.

Following the game's release, the Skullgirls team began teasing future content for the game, including new voice packs, color palettes, and downloadable characters. However, shortly thereafter, Autumn Games was hit with a series of lawsuits regarding Def Jam Rapstar, which "gummed up everything related to Autumn's funding." The entire Skullgirls development team was laid off by Reverge Labs in June 2012 after Autumn Games and Reverge Labs allowed their contract to expire without agreeing upon a new one. This prompted the team to reform under a new moniker, Lab Zero Games, to continue work on the PC release and downloadable content. Autumn Games, revealed to be in full possession of the IP, claimed it was "fully behind the new studio" and promised to "continue to work with [Lab Zero Games] in the future on all Skullgirls-related endeavors."

From January through February 2013, fighting game website Shoryuken hosted a charity donation drive to determine the final game to be featured in the 2013 Evolution Championship Series' (EVO) tournament lineup, with all proceeds sent to the Breast Cancer Research Foundation. The Skullgirls community raised over US$78,000, placing second to eventual winner Super Smash Bros. Melee, which raised over $94,000. Although the game did not win, Shoryuken announced that EVO 2013 event organizers would support the Skullgirls side tournament by providing prize money and exhibition support due to their effort in the fundraiser.

=== Crowdfunding and publisher transition ===
Despite Autumn Games' support and desire to expand Skullgirls, their continued litigation prevented the publisher from providing any financial backing. Attempting to pick up where they left off, Lab Zero Games decided to ask its fanbase for help once more, following the success of the EVO 2013 charity drive. In February 2013, Lab Zero Games set up an Indiegogo page for Skullgirls, in an effort to raise $150,000 for the development of the game's first DLC character, Squigly. Contributors received various rewards, including desktop wallpapers, a digital copy of the official soundtrack, and the chance to add a background character to the game, among others. The campaign reached its initial goal in less than 24 hours, while the stretch goal of a second DLC character, Big Band, secured funding in just over 2 weeks. A third DLC character, determined by fan vote, was funded during the final two days, along with a playable robotic version of Ms. Fortune named Robo-Fortune. An additional stretch goal that would provide a free license for the game's engine, Z-Engine, to the developers of Them's Fightin' Herds (at the time called Fighting is Magic) was also funded. Just before the end of the drive, the last stretch goal was met, securing funding for another fan-selected DLC character. The Indiegogo campaign raised nearly $830,000 of its original $150,000 goal. Several alternate character and announcer voice packs were also funded. All downloadable characters and voice packs were free to download on all platforms within the first three months of their release.

In November 2013, Lab Zero Games announced that Autumn Games had severed ties with Konami, citing Konami's unresponsiveness as a major hurdle to the release of further console patches. Following the dissolution of the partnership, Konami requested the removal of Skullgirls from the PlayStation Network and Xbox Live Arcade by the end of 2013. In response, Lab Zero Games announced in December 2013 that Skullgirls would be re-released on consoles as Skullgirls Encore, a new build including up-to-date changes and additions, in January 2014. Encore marked the transition of the console versions to its new publishers, Marvelous and CyberFront, and coincided with the console release of Squigly. While Encore was released as a title update for the Xbox 360 version, the PlayStation 3 version required owners to re-download the game at no cost; leaderboard rankings, save data, and trophies were not carried over. The PC version was later patched to reflect the new title.

=== Staff resignations and developer transition ===
In June 2020, multiple allegations of misconduct were made against lead designer and programmer Mike Zaimont. Two individuals claimed that Zaimont had made inappropriate sexual comments towards them, which triggered an internal investigation of Zaimont's behavior within Lab Zero Games. A decision was reached by Lab Zero Games' board to request Zaimont's resignation. According to senior art producer Brian Jun, Zaimont refused to resign unless a series of demands were met, which Jun deemed "unrealistically high and potentially illegal". Zaimont's demands were rejected by the board. In response, Zaimont disbanded the board and assumed sole ownership of Lab Zero Games. Senior animator Jonathan "Persona" Kim claimed that Zaimont delivered an ultimatum wherein he gave all unsatisfied employees until the end of August to leave the company. By late August, Kim, Jun, and lead animator Mariel Cartwright resigned from Lab Zero Games and individually issued statements denouncing Zaimont's actions.

Within a day of the series of resignations, Hidden Variable Studios and Autumn Games severed their ties with Mike Zaimont and Lab Zero Games in a joint statement. In the statement, both parties expressed intent to work with the employees who resigned from Lab Zero Games on the continued development of Skullgirls. Shortly after the resignations, Zaimont retaliated by firing the rest of the staff, leaving him the sole employee and owner of Lab Zero Games. Cartwright raised money for the staff, who had been fired without severance, by selling her sketchbooks. Additional inappropriate interactions with the community came to light after the resignations. Several former Lab Zero Games members, including Cartwright and Kim, then went on to establish a new cooperatively-structured independent game studio called Future Club.

In February 2021, Autumn Games revealed the development of the Season 1 Pass, which included four DLC characters, a digital artbook, and an updated soundtrack. The publisher also teased the possibility of a fifth DLC fighter, along with other free content, depending on the success of the season pass. In March 2021, Future Club formally announced their collaboration with Hidden Variable Studios in developing 2nd Encore's DLC content.

=== Legal ===
In April 2021, lead animator Mariel Cartwright and CEO Francesca Esquenazi sued Lab Zero for Mike Zaimont's wrongful termination. In May 2021, Lab Zero countersued, stating that Cartwright and Esquenzai were out to intentionally destroy Lab Zero and Zaimont's image, causing the company to break up so they could start a competing business and poach Lab Zero employees. The countersuit also claims that Cartwright and Esquenzai were the ones who talked about sex and related topics with Zaimont, and then publicly mischaracterized it as harassment. Cartwright and Esquenzai motioned to dismiss the countersuit, but the Los Angeles Superior Court Judge denied the motion in May 2022, and allowed the countersuit to proceed. The wrongful termination suits were settled by all affected parties in April 2026.

In January 2025, Hidden Variable ended their partnership with Autumn Games and filed a lawsuit against them alleging unpaid fees of roughly $1.2 million for work done on Skullgirls Mobile since November 2024. Autumn Games responded by claiming they have "taken over" development of the game and will continue to support it with new features, such as Guilds.

== Soundtrack ==
Skullgirls Original Soundtrack

Soundtrack album by Various artists
- Released: April 24, 2012
- Genre: Video game soundtrack
- Length: 71:46

The Skullgirls Original Soundtrack consists of 28 original compositions. The album features music by Michiru Yamane, Vincent Diamante, Blaine McGurty, and Brenton Kossak. Yamane's involvement was announced by Reverge Labs in April 2011, marking the first time a Japanese composer had anchored the soundtrack for an American-developed game. According to Reverge Labs CEO Richard Wyckoff, the developers sought out Yamane because "[they] knew her mixture of haunting gothic themes, jazz and rock would lend itself perfectly to Skullgirls' 'Dark Deco' style." When Reverge Labs requested Yamane to write "jazzy" music, she "played a bit with the rhythm and different sounds to try and heighten the impact and almost primal nature of the unique graphics." The soundtrack was released on April 21, 2012, on iTunes.

== Release ==
Skullgirls was released on the PlayStation Network in North America on April 10, 2012, and worldwide through the Xbox Live Arcade on April 11, 2012. Europe and Australia later received the PlayStation Network version on May 2, 2012. The Microsoft Windows version was released by Marvelous on August 22, 2013. The game was also published in Japan by CyberFront and brought to Japanese arcades through the NESiCAxLive digital distribution system by developer M2.

Skullgirls Encore launched on the PlayStation Network in North America on February 11, 2014, and Europe on March 19, 2014. The Xbox Live Arcade version of Skullgirls received an update for Encore on April 22, 2014. On July 10, 2014, Lab Zero Games announced that Skullgirls Encore would be released on PlayStation 4 and PlayStation Vita sometime in 2014. This port, later titled Skullgirls 2nd Encore, would eventually be delayed until 2015. 2nd Encore was released for PlayStation 4 in North America on July 7, 2015, and Europe on July 23, 2015. The PlayStation Vita version was released in North America on April 5, 2016, and Europe on April 14, 2016. 2nd Encore was also published for both platforms in Japan by Arc System Works on April 14, 2016. In North America, Hidden Variable Studios and Limited Run Games produced a limited physical edition of 2nd Encore, which included a disc-based copy of the game, a slip cover, a full-color instruction manual, and a special selection soundtrack.

In May 2013, when Lab Zero Games was asked on their official Twitter account about a potential release for Nintendo's Wii U console, the developer replied that while it was possible, it "[wasn't] looking likely", citing the console's low sales and not having an established "digital presence" at the time. During Anime Expo in July 2018, Lab Zero Games confirmed that a port of 2nd Encore was in development for its successor, the Nintendo Switch. The Nintendo Switch release would include all content, and be available both physically and digitally. In February 2019, an Xbox One port was announced, which was planned for release alongside the Nintendo Switch version, courtesy of Skybound Games. The game was released for the Nintendo Switch on October 22, 2019; however, the Xbox One version was postponed indefinitely "due to unforeseen development and production challenges". In May 2022, the Xbox One port was revealed to be in development again, along with versions for the Xbox Series X and Series S. The ports had a targeted release window of 2022, but were eventually pushed back to 2023.

=== Skullgirls Mobile ===
The free-to-play spin-off for Android and iOS, titled Skullgirls Mobile, was released on May 25, 2017, in North America, South America, Europe, Australia, New Zealand, and the Philippines. It was developed by Hidden Variable Studios and published by Line Corporation, creators of the Line communications app. The mobile version of Skullgirls incorporates role-playing-like progression, customization, and deck-building mechanics. Eventually, Line Corporation decided to part ways with the project, with Autumn Games taking over publishing duties. As such, the old version of the game, preemptively renamed LINE Skullgirls, was removed from all storefronts on January 15, 2018. A new version, designated Skullgirls 2.0 by the developer, was released on January 18, 2018, and allowed existing players to carry over their progress. As a result of the move, Hidden Variable Studios promised more transparency over the game's microtransactions, namely in its gacha rates, as well as more consistent release of new content. Currently, Skullgirls Mobile is supported alongside 2nd Encore, and shares many of its updates.

== Adaptations ==
=== Webcomics ===
At the 2019 Anime Expo, a webcomic series published by South Korean publishing service WEBTOON was announced. The webcomic, written by Mike Exner III and illustrated by Wiirdo/Pasteldot and Artist Black/Suzi Blake, began publishing weekly on November 19, 2022. and finished February 2, 2024 with 26 episodes divided into 1 season.

== Reception ==
=== Critical response ===
Reception

Aggregate score
| Aggregator | Score |
|---|---|
| Metacritic | PS3: 82/100; X360: 78/100; PC: 83/100; PS4: 82/100; VITA: 76/100; NS: 80/100 |

Review scores
| Publication | Score |
|---|---|
| 1Up.com | B+ |
| Eurogamer | 7/10 |
| G4 | 4/5 |
| Game Informer | 8/10 |
| GameSpot | 8/10 |
| GamesRadar+ | 4/5 |
| GameTrailers | 8.3/10 |
| IGN | 8.5/10 |
| Joystiq | 3/5 |

Skullgirls received "generally positive" reviews, according to video game review aggregator website Metacritic.

Several reviewers praised the presentation and animation. Ryan Clements of IGN praised the graphics, claiming that the game created "some of the best hand-drawn character sprites ever used in gaming." Clements also gave the game an Editor's Choice award. John Learned of GamesRadar also praised the art style, stating that the art deco design gave playable characters and backgrounds added flair. However, some reviewers criticized the art style and overtly sexualized all-female cast, including accusations of sexism. Dan Ryckert of Game Informer stated that while Skullgirls was beautifully animated, some animations were "juvenile and unnecessary". Ryckert expressed disappointment with the artistic focus on "anatomy and fetishistic outfits."

Reviewers also praised the gameplay and system mechanics. Maxwell McGee of GameSpot credited the ability to adjust team sizes, adding that the trade-off between strength and versatility helped to accommodate a wider skill range of players. Neidel Crisan of 1UP praised the tutorial system for teaching beginner players about the fundamentals of the fighting game genre. Daniel Maniago of G4 complimented the custom assists, anti-infinite system, and online play, praising Reverge Labs for utilizing feedback from the fighting game community during development.

Skullgirls received its share of criticism. IGN's Ryan Clements criticized the small selection of gameplay modes, missing character move lists, and overly aggressive AI. GameTrailers criticized the limited roster size, stating that the tag-based battling felt underdeveloped as a result. Simon Parkin of Eurogamer pointed out the lack of online features, such as a spectator mode, replays, and endless lobbies. Jordan Mallory of Joystiq reprimanded the game for its "goofy and immature" premise, sexualized art style, and unoriginal character movesets. Mallory concluded that the series would have been better off spending another year in development.

Skullgirls received Best Fighting Game nominations from IGN, 1UP, and the Official E3 Game Critics Awards. The game was nominated for 2012 Best Animated Video Game at the 40th Annual Annie Awards. Skullgirls was also recognized in the 2013 Guinness World Records Gamer's Edition for the most frames of animation per character, reaching 11,515 total frames for its initial eight characters and averaging 1,439 frames per fighter. In 2017, Skullgirls 2nd Encore was listed in Game Informer's list of "The 10 Most Underrated Games Of This Generation".

=== Sales ===
Skullgirls sold over 50,000 copies across both platforms within ten days, becoming the highest selling game on the Xbox Live Arcade upon its release and third best-selling title on PlayStation Network for April 2012. The game saw a similar performance in Japan, climbing to the top of PSN's list of best-selling downloadable PlayStation 3 titles within a week. According to Peter Bartholow, CEO of Lab Zero Games, Skullgirls met Japanese publisher CyberFront's lifetime sales expectations in the first two weeks of release. The PS4 version entered the Japanese charts at #17. On September 4, 2017, Zaimont announced that Skullgirls had sold one million copies on Steam.

=== Legacy ===
In 2020, after the Evolution Championship Series announced its shift to an online-only format in response to the COVID-19 pandemic, Skullgirls 2nd Encore was added to its main lineup of games, owing to its use of rollback netcode. The entire event was eventually cancelled after EVO CEO Joey Cuellar was placed on administrative leave following sexual misconduct allegations. Skullgirls ultimately made its debut as a main lineup game at EVO 2022, over a decade after its original release.

In June 2023, the game was review bombed on Steam after a patch was released which focused on altering elements deemed insensitive or exploitative by Hidden Variable Studios, Future Club, and Autumn Games, with negative fan reviews proclaiming the alterations as a form of censorship. These changes included, among other things, the removal of allusions to real world hate groups and upskirt shots of teenage fighters, toning down depictions of racial violence in the story, and deleting several illustrations from the guest art gallery. According to game director Charley Price, the updates were made to reflect the "values and broad vision for Skullgirls moving forward."
