= Jimmie Johnson's Anything with an Engine =

2011 video game

- Developer: Isopod Labs
- Publisher: Autumn Games
- Platforms: PlayStation 3, Wii, Xbox 360
- Release: NA: November 1, 2011
- Genre: Racing
- Modes: Single-player, multiplayer

Jimmie Johnson's Anything with an Engine is a 2011 racing video game for the PlayStation 3, Wii and Xbox 360. The game features NASCAR Sprint Cup Series champion Jimmie Johnson.

== Promotion ==
On August 13, 2011, Johnson competed in the Zippo 200 at the Glen at Watkins Glen International, driving the No. 7 Jimmie Johnson's Anything with an Engine Chevrolet Impala for JR Motorsports. Johnson finished the race in second place.

On November 25, 2011, Johnson appeared on Late Night with Jimmy Fallon to announce the game's first downloadable character, a James Bond-inspired Jimmy Fallon, from which a portion of the download proceeds would be donated to the American Red Cross. The character can only be acquired in the PlayStation 3 and Xbox 360 versions of the game.

== Reception ==
Jimmie Johnson's Anything with an Engine received mixed reviews from critics. On Metacritic, the game holds scores of 67/100 for the PlayStation 3 version (based on 5 reviews) and 65/100 for the Xbox 360 version (based on 5 reviews). Matthew Kato of Game Informer rated the game a 7.25/10, praising the game's various modes and tracks but criticizing the game's lack of new or stand-out features to "expand the kart-racing genre."
