= Avatar Legends: The Fighting Game =

- Developers: Gameplay Group International exA-Arcadia (Arcade)
- Publishers: PM Studios; Paramount Games Studio exA-Arcadia (Arcade)
- Directors: Campbell Tran; Young Chow
- Producers: José Rodrigues; Geoff Mendicino
- Designers: Ryan Santiago; Mario Cruz
- Programmers: Mike Zaimont; Rossen Tachkov; Chris Huval
- Artists: Léana Lapointe; Magui Barone; Santiago R. Villa; Lua Costa
- Platforms: Arcade; Nintendo Switch; Playstation 5; Windows; Xbox Series X/S; Nintendo Switch 2
- Release: July 14, 2026: Arcade; July 23, 2026; Nintendo Switch, PlayStation 5, Windows; July 23, 2026; Xbox Series X/S; September 3, 2026; Nintendo Switch 2; October 29, 2026
- Genre: Fighting
- Modes: Single-player, multiplayer

Avatar Legends: The Fighting Game is a 2026 fighting game developed by Gameplay Group International and published by PM Studios and Paramount Games Studio, based on the Avatar Legends franchise. The game was released on July 23, 2026 on Microsoft Windows, PlayStation 5, and Nintendo Switch. An Xbox Series X/S version was released on September 3, while the Nintendo Switch 2 version released on October 29, 2026. The game received positive reviews from critics.

== Gameplay ==
Avatar Legends: The Fighting Game consists of one-on-one fights as well as a 27-chapter Story Mode. In the story, Aang, Korra, and Kyoshi find the world has been drastically altered by a rift during the Harmonic Convergence, bringing people from different eras and altering their memories, and investigate who is behind the phenomenon.

Each character comes with three supports that can alter their playstyle, similar to the variation system seen in Mortal Kombat X. For example, if Aang has Gyatso as a support, his air scooter improves, but if he has Momo as a support, he has more control over his glider.

=== Playable Characters ===
The game also includes twelve characters from Avatar: The Last Airbender and The Legend of Korra. In addition, five more characters will be added via a Year One Pass with the fifth character will be determined by a fan poll, with the options being Tenzin, Kuvira, Amon, King Bumi and Asami. On July 2026 it was announced that Tagah from the recently released Avatar Aang movie would also be added to Season 1 as free DLC.

- Aang
- Avatar Aang ^{U}
- Azula
- Bolin ^{D}
- Iroh ^{D}
- Katara
- Korra
- Kyoshi
- Lin Beifong ^{D}
- Nightmare Korra ^{U}
- Ozai
- Sokka
- Tagah ^{D}
- Toph Beifong
- Ty Lee ^{D}
- Zaheer
- Zuko

^U Unlockable characters
^D DLC only

== Development ==
Development for Avatar Legends: The Fighting Game was announced in February 2024, with a planned 2025 release. The game was originally to be developed by Maximum Games. The game was quietly cancelled in late 2024 according to a financial report. The game resumed development the next year under a new developer, Gameplay Group International, who develops previously cancelled games. The game features hand-drawn animations that mimic the series' art style.

== Release ==
The game was originally set to be released on July 3, 2026, but then the game was delayed to July 23. The game was further delayed on Xbox Series X/S just hours before the game's launch, with a new release date of September 3. Nintendo Everything reported that a Nintendo Switch 2 version will be released later in the year on October 29.

A PlayStation 4 version was planned to be released, but it was quietly cancelled.

== Reception ==
Reception

Aggregate scores
Aggregator	Score
Metacritic	PC: 80/100; PS5: 77/100
OpenCritic	61% recommend

Review score
Publication	Score
IGN	8/10

The game received "generally favorable" reviews, according to review aggregator website Metacritic. Mitchell Saltzman of IGN wrote that the game is "one of the most fun fighting games I’ve ever played", praising the game's 2D animations, combos, and combat styles. Saltzman also liked the playstyles of each of the game's 12 characters. Saltzman criticized the game's story mode and lack of features, including the ability to change the AI's difficulty.

Avatar Legends: The Fighting Game received a nomination for "Best Fighting Game" at The Game Awards 2026.
