= Ikken hissatsu =

Martial Art

Japanese name
- Kanji: 一拳必殺
- Hiragana: いっけんひっさつ

Ikken Hissatsu (一拳必殺) is a term used in traditional karate, meaning "to annihilate at one blow" or "one blow; sure kill". This, however, does not mean that any clash can nor should be resolved with the use of only one stroke, but it conveys the spirit with which the karateka should approach every movement in training and kata.

According to some (but not all) interpretations of the practical applications of kata (aka 'bunkai'), karate was modeled so that a person could face more than one opponent simultaneously which would make Ikken Hissatsu crucial. Some believe the advent of 'sports karate' has thus de-emphasised Ikken Hissatsu. Others argue, however, that kime (決め, the instant of full-body tension at the end of a properly applied karate technique) may only be attainable with a that mindset of "one blow; sure kill".

None-the-less, arduous training is required to effectively attain such a technique.
