= Street Fighter III: 3rd Strike =

1999 video game

- Japanese arcade flyer
- Developers: Capcom; Iron Galaxy Studios (Online Edition)
- Publishers: Capcom; Dreamcast: JP/NA: Capcom; PAL: Virgin Interactive
- Producers: Yoshiki Okamoto; Noritaka Funamizu; Kouji Nakajima
- Designers: Toshiba Ishizawa; Haruo Murata; Tomonori Ohnuma
- Composer: Hideki Okugawa
- Series: Street Fighter
- Platforms: Arcade, Dreamcast, PlayStation 3, Xbox 360
- Release: May 12, 1999: Arcade; JP: May 12, 1999; EU: June 8, 1999; NA: 1999 Dreamcast; JP: June 29, 2000; NA: October 4, 2000; UK: December 15, 2000 PlayStation 3 & Xbox 360 (Online Edition); JP/NA: August 23, 2011; EU: August 24, 2011
- Genre: Fighting
- Modes: Single-player, multiplayer
- Arcade system: CP System III

Street Fighter III: 3rd Strike - Fight for the Future (Note: Japanese: ストリートファイターIII サードストライク ファイト・フォー・ザ・フューチャー) is a 1999 fighting game developed and published by Capcom for arcades. It is the second and final updated version of Street Fighter III, following Street Fighter III: 2nd Impact. Like its predecessors, it runs on the CP System III hardware.

3rd Strike increased the character roster by adding five new characters, notably including Chun-Li. It also added further refinements to the previous game's play mechanics and rules, including improvements to the parry system. It was ported to the Dreamcast in 2000. In 2004, it was released on the PlayStation 2 and Xbox as part of the Street Fighter Anniversary Collection. A downloadable online version titled Street Fighter III: 3rd Strike Online Edition was released on PlayStation 3 and Xbox 360 in 2011.

Although not very popular upon release, it amassed positive reviews, and eventually gained a large cult following years after release. The game has a significant competitive gaming scene, which included Evo Moment 37 (also known as the "Daigo Parry"), often considered the most iconic moment in competitive gaming history. On May 29, 2018, Street Fighter III: 3rd Strike was released as a part of the Street Fighter 30th Anniversary Collection for the Nintendo Switch, PlayStation 4, Windows, and Xbox One.

== Gameplay ==
Released in May 1999, the third and final installment of Street Fighter III brought back the classic Street Fighter II character Chun-Li, along with four new characters (Makoto, Remy, Q, and Twelve), extending the selectable roster to 19 characters, with Akuma now being a regular character. All of the returning characters from the previous Street Fighter III games were given new stages, endings, and voice actors for certain characters, continuing the overall storyline from where the first two games left off.

The commands for air parries, throws/holds, and leap attacks were changed from 2nd Impact. Additionally, the player can perform a "Guard Parry" or a parry during a guard stun if the timing is right. A "Guard Parry" is also known as a "Red Parry" because the character turns red when performing it. The game also introduces a grade-based "Judgement System", in which the winning player in a single or two-player match is graded after the match based on offense, defense, techniques, and extra points. Special points are also awarded after fulfilling specific requirements.

The single-player mode consists of fighting ten regular opponents, which includes a character-specific rival as the penultimate opponent and Gill as the final boss for each of the characters except for Gill himself, whose final boss is Alex. Despite his status as a regularly selectable character, the CPU version of Q can only be fought in the single-player mode as a secret challenger. The "Parry the Ball" minigame from Street Fighter III: 2nd Impact returns as well as a new version of the "Crush the Car" minigame from Street Fighter II.

== Characters and timeline ==
All the characters from 2nd Impact returned, with the exception of Shin Akuma, a computer-controlled version of Akuma with more powerful techniques (although the character still exists in the game's code). All of the returning characters, with a few exceptions, had new voice actors for 3rd Strike. The following five characters were added to the roster:

- Chun-Li (voiced by Atsuko Tanaka) - After having retired from fighting for a while, she becomes a fighter once again when a young orphan under her care is kidnapped under mysterious circumstances and sets off to find her.
- Makoto (voiced by Makoto Tsumura) - A young Japanese girl, trained in karate. Since her father's death, Makoto's dojo, Rindoukan, has been floundering, so she seeks to challenge other fighters around the world to restore her school to a flourishing state.
- Q (voiced by Len Carlson) - A mysterious figure wearing a mask and an overcoat who is being pursued by the CIA because of sightings around the world near accidents and he is even thought to have been the cause. While he can be chosen as a playable character, he is a hidden computer-controlled opponent in the single-player mode.
- Remy (voiced by Eiji Sekiguchi) - A long-haired fighter from France wearing a leather jacket emblazoned with an omega. He bears a grudge against all fighters after he and his late sister were abandoned by their father who decided to go fight. His move set is similar to that of Guile and Charlie, but has a different fighting style known as Savate.
- Twelve (voiced by Lawrence Bayne) - A shapeshifting soldier developed by Gill's organization. Twelve is ordered to hunt down his prototype, Necro, as his first mission.

Chronologically, 3rd Strike takes place nearly one year after the events of New Generation and 2nd Impact, as confirmed by Elena's official character profile, which notes that nearly a year has passed since she parted ways with her friends in Japan, and hopes to gain new friends while studying in France. Other character profiles note a continuation of previous character storylines, such as Necro still on the run from Gill's organization, Ibuki about to graduate from high school, and Urien resentful of the fact that he sees himself as living in his brother's shadow despite becoming the new president of their organization (as depicted in his 2nd Impact ending) and seeks to “punish” Gill for being promoted to Emperor (a higher ranking position) instead of him.

== Release ==
Street Fighter III: 3rd Strike was originally released for the arcades in 1999. There are three revisions of the arcade board, with differences in bugs and gameplay mechanics (specifically, "unblockables" for the characters Urien and Oro).

The Dreamcast version was released in 2000. Like Double Impact, this version features an Arcade, Versus, Training (with normal and parry training) and Options modes, as well as a "System Direction" mode which allows the player to adjust several of the game's features. Like in Double Impact, Gill can be selected by the player, but only after fulfilling certain requirements. Also, one additional remix of each character's musical theme, not present in the original arcade version, was composed for this version, and it was played during the third round of each match. These additional remixes were also included in the PlayStation 2 version. This version was based on the third revision of the game that removed the "unblockables" for some characters. In this version, by clearing the game with every character including Gill, the extra options, such as infinite super arts, will be available for toggling on/off. It did however introduce significant lag that EVO 2004 players opted to play on the original arcade version as the definitive version of the game.

A PlayStation 2 version of 3rd Strike was released in 2004, with all of the features from the Dreamcast version, including a choice between the arcade and Dreamcast version's respective soundtracks, but based on the earlier arcade revisions with "unblockables" intact. It was released in Japan as a standalone game, with a limited edition package containing an All About Street Fighter history book, a 500-piece jigsaw puzzle, and a strategy DVD. The PS2 version was released in North America as part of the Street Fighter Anniversary Collection, a two-in-one bundle that also includes Hyper Street Fighter II. The PS2 version was not released in the PAL region. The PS2 version was re-released in Japan on September 18, 2008, in a two in one bundle with Capcom vs. SNK 2.

An Xbox version of the Street Fighter Anniversary Collection was also released during the year in all three regions. The Xbox version of 3rd Strike includes all of the features from the PS2 version, as well as an online Versus mode.

=== Online Edition ===
At the 2010 San Diego Comic-Con, Capcom announced that an online edition of 3rd Strike titled Street Fighter III: Third Strike Online Edition was in development. The game features enhanced visual settings and GGPO-built online play. The version was done by Iron Galaxy Studios and has similar features to Final Fight: Double Impact, including visual filters, an optional remixed soundtrack by Simon Viklund, and bonus content unlocked by completing in-game achievements. Other new modes include Tournament and Spectator modes, as well as Trial modes that teach the game's fundamentals and the ability to share replays on YouTube.

Online Edition was released for PlayStation 3 via PlayStation Network on August 23, 2011, and on Xbox 360 via Xbox Live Arcade on August 24, 2011. Although marketed as "arcade perfect", its codebase is derived from the PS2 version. The game reached #8 at the PSN download sales chart. A final patch to correct certain issues with the game was released on February 12, 2014.

=== Street Fighter 30th Anniversary Collection ===
The arcade version of 3rd Strike is a featured game in 30th Anniversary Collection (released 2018); this game, in conjunction with Street Fighter II: Hyper Fighting, Super Street Fighter II Turbo and Street Fighter Alpha 3, has online functionality. Unlike Online Edition, 30th Anniversary Collection features a proprietary netcode solution developed by Digital Eclipse.

== Soundtrack ==
The themes for the games are predominantly house, jungle and drum and bass, with some jazz, hip-hop, and techno elements. While Yuki Iwai worked on the soundtracks for New Generation and 2nd Impact, Hideki Okugawa worked on all three games. The soundtrack to the first game in the series was released on CD by First Smile Entertainment in 1997, while the 3rd Strike original soundtrack was released by Mars Colony Music in 2000 with an arranged version afterward. The soundtrack to 3rd Strike features three songs and announcer tracks by Canadian rapper Infinite.

== Reception ==
Reception

Aggregate scores
Aggregator	Score		
Aggregator	Dreamcast	PS3	Xbox 360
GameRankings	81%		
Metacritic	84/100	86/100	86/100

Review scores
Publication	Score		
Publication	Dreamcast	PS3	Xbox 360
1Up.com		A	A
Destructoid		9/10	
Electronic Gaming Monthly	78.30%		
Eurogamer			9/10
Famitsu	8/10, 8/10, 9/10, 9/10		
G4		5/5	5/5
Game Informer	82.50%		
GamePro	18/20	4.5/5	
GameRevolution	B−	B+	B+
GameSpot	7.4/10	8/10	8/10
GamesTM			9/10
IGN	8.3/10	9/10	9/10
Next Generation	3/5		
PlayStation Official Magazine – UK		9/10	
Official Xbox Magazine (UK)			9/10
Official Xbox Magazine (US)			9/10
Play		5/5	
PlayStation: The Official Magazine		9/10	
Gaming Age	A		A−
DC-UK	7/10		
Metro GameCentral			9/10
Retro Gamer		96%	

In Japan, Game Machine listed the game on their July 1, 1999 issue as being the most-successful arcade game of the month. It became Japan's ninth highest-grossing arcade software kit of 1999. The home console versions sold 56,741 units for the Dreamcast in Japan, 49,088 for the PS2 in Japan, and 60,246 for the Dreamcast in the United States. 3rd Strike was initially not very popular, but was moderately profitable. It eventually gained a large cult following years after its release.

Street Fighter III 3rd Strike has received positive reviews. In 2004, Game Revolution said that it "just isn't a very exciting addition. The game is essentially like all the other Street Fighters, but with a parrying system", before concluding that it does not do "anything remotely interesting graphically; unsurprising when you consider that these games have barely grown at all visually in fifteen years" IGN said it was "worthy of just about anyone's private collection... that is unless you already have Double Impact," while CNET said it was "weaker in the graphics department than its predecessor."

Reviewing the Dreamcast version, the four reviewers in Famitsu gave the game high scores. Two reviewers found it amazing that the series continued to evolve with each new installment while two reviewers also complimented the additional modes in the game such as a training mode. One of the reviewers said the game may be daunting for newcomers to fighting games, and one said they felt the characters may be a bit imbalanced, while still condluding that it was among the best of the 2D fighting games currently available.

Chet Barber reviewed the Dreamcast version of the game for Next Generation, rating it three stars out of five, and wrote it was "A very deep and complex game that's a blast to play, with welcome new characters and a few extras. But if you've already played SFIII, you're probably as burned out as we are."

Retrospectively, 3rd Strike was ranked as the 11th best arcade game of the 1990s by Complex; the magazine also placed it tenth on their list of best 2D fighting games of all time in 2013, stating it "is a lot better than many people ever gave it credit for."

== Legacy ==
While not particularly popular at the time of its release (which is generally attributed to it being a 2D fighter during a 3D craze and the growing power of home consoles over arcades), the reputation of 3rd Strike improved over time in the fighting game community. Its smooth graphics and pixel animations have also received praise for their clarity and personality. 3rd Strike is also notable for being the game played in the now-famous Evo Moment 37 (where Daigo Umehara performed the "Daigo Parry"), which is often considered the most iconic moment of competitive gaming and inspired many to start playing 3rd Strike which brought new life into the fighting game community during a time when the community was in a state of stagnancy. A 2022 article published by IGN named it "the greatest fighting game ever made."
