= Them's Fightin' Herds =

2020 video game

- Developer: Mane6
- Publishers: Humble Bundle (2018–2021); Modus Games (2022–2025); Gameplay Group International
- Producer: Aaron Stavely
- Designers: Lauren Faust; Omari Smith
- Programmers: Chris Huval (lead); Patrick McCarthy; Kenneth Leung
- Artists: Lindsay Towns; Lucas Ellinghaus; Lachlan Cartland
- Writers: Lauren Faust; Ryan Faust; Francisco Copado; Aaron Stavely
- Composers: Stuart Ferguson; Kare "Whitetail" Wade
- Platforms: Microsoft Windows; Linux; macOS; Nintendo Switch; PlayStation 4; PlayStation 5; Xbox One; Xbox Series X/S
- Release: Windows; April 30, 2020; Linux; March 25, 2021; macOS; October 27, 2021; Switch, PlayStation 4, PlayStation 5, Xbox One, Xbox Series X/S; October 18, 2022
- Genre: Fighting
- Modes: Single-player, multiplayer

Them's Fightin' Herds is an indie fighting game developed by Mane6 and published by Gameplay Group International. It features a cast of ungulate characters fighting each other to find a champion worthy of gaining a magical key that will protect their world from predators. First released into early access in February 2018, the full release was on April 30, 2020, for Microsoft Windows, followed by Linux on March 25, 2021, and a beta macOS version was added on October 27, 2021. The game was released for Nintendo Switch, PlayStation 4, PlayStation 5, Xbox One, and Xbox Series X/S on October 18, 2022.

The project is a spiritual successor to Mane6's earlier, unreleased fighting game Fighting Is Magic, based on the animated television show My Little Pony: Friendship Is Magic. Mane6 was a nine-man game development team and part of the adult fandom of the show. Fighting Is Magic featured the six main pony characters from that show. Early versions of this game were released in 2012, drawing attention from both players in the Evolution Championship Series due to the unique moves associated with non-bipedal characters in fighting games, as well as from Hasbro which owned the intellectual property to My Little Pony. After Hasbro sent Mane6 a cease and desist letter, Mane6 discarded the assets tied to the show, while keeping some of the fundamental gameplay factors to create the new title Them's Fightin' Herds.

The creator of My Little Pony: Friendship Is Magic, Lauren Faust, offered to help with designing the new characters for the game. Development of the game was completed with crowdfunding through Indiegogo.

A separate effort created by fans not associated with the Mane6 team released their Fighting Is Magic: Tribute Edition of the original Mane6 My Little Pony-inspired game in early 2014. This game was made from various beta assets of the original which Mane6 developed in the first two years, and were later leaked by other parties.

== Gameplay ==
The game uses a four-button fighting system: a button each for light, medium, heavy, and magic attacks, and includes staple fighting game maneuvers such as launchers, pushblocking, and cross-ups.

Currently, there are seven playable characters, with four more purchasable through DLC, all of which have their own unique fighting styles and moves. These fighting styles range from fast and aggressive, to slow and defensive, with all characters having a high emphasis on fighting with combos.

The game supports both local and online multiplayer via both a near-isometric pixel art lobby system, and an automatic matchmaking system. Players who own BlazBlue: Central Fiction, Guilty Gear Xrd Rev 2 or Skullgirls on Steam will unlock special cosmetics for their in-game lobby avatars inspired by characters from those games. There are also offline single-player modes available, including an extensive tutorial plus training mode, an incomplete story mode, and player vs. AI fighting (arcade mode).

== Synopsis ==
=== Setting and characters ===
Them's Fightin' Herds is a fighting game based on sapient four-legged hoofed creatures from the world of Fœnum, which is being threatened by the return of carnivorous beasts known as the Predators. The Predators were locked away in a separate realm, but they have found a way to escape it. To put an end to the threat, selected champions of the various Fœnum races are chosen as "Key Seekers" by their tribes to find the key that will lock the Predators away again. The Key Seekers must face each other in a friendly competition to determine which one will be the Key Keeper who will face the champion of the Predators.

There are six playable characters—Arizona the cow (voiced by Tara Strong), Velvet the reindeer (Tia Ballard), Paprika the alpaca (Marieve Herington), Oleander the unicorn (Alexa Kahn) who can summon a demonic being known as "Fred" (Keith Ferguson), Pom the sheep (Allie Moreno) and Tianhuo the longma (Kay Bess)—each with different fighting move sets and unique movement options such as flight, short hops, double jumps, or air dashes. Jessica Gee voices the game's announcer. A seventh playable character, pirate goat Shanty (Afi Ekulona), was also released as downloadable content due to the crowdfunding campaign reaching its stretch goals; she was later included in the base roster for all versions. Additional characters were released via a season pass, including Arizona's bull father Texas (Patrick Seitz), Velvet's father Stronghoof (Christopher Sabat), Nidra the tapir (Anjali Kunapaneni), and Baihe (Crystal Lee), another longma fighter.

=== Storyline ===
The game's story mode begins with Arizona making her way from the prairie to Reine City, sent on her quest by her parents, as the declared Champion of the Prairie. Along the way, she passes through a system of caves that used to be a salt mine, which are now filled with shadowy predators. In Reine City, Arizona heads to the museum to find some clues about the Prophet's Key. When Velvet shows up and learns that Arizona is the Champion of the Prairie, she challenges Arizona to a fight on the steps in front of the museum. Arizona defeats her, and Velvet's ice sprites carry her away. Desperate to get Arizona out of the city, a citizen gives her his boat tickets and sends her off to the Alpake Highlands. In the Highlands, Arizona climbs up a mountain while fighting off birds of prey. At the top, exhausted, she is rescued by members of the local Alpake tribe. After waking up, she talks to their leader, Adobo, who warns her of the "Terror of the Foggy Mountaintops". Arizona is pursued by a mysterious figure in the fog, but the figure always stays hidden a distance away while laughing. At a clearing in the fog, Arizona examines a stone only to see it rumble; Paprika bursts out of it and proceeds to "fight" Arizona through a series of hugs, kisses, and fourth-wall-breaking stunts. Arizona prevails, leaving Paprika dazed and out cold.

In the Temple of the Ancestors, which Arizona learned about at the Reine City Museum and from Adobo, Arizona fights more predators while solving some puzzles. Finally, she reaches the Hall of the Monolith. Before she can inspect the monolith, Oleander shows up, and like with Velvet, realizes that she and Arizona are rivals. Oleander and Arizona begin fighting, with Fhtng th§ ¿nsp§kbl (or "Fred") helping her out as the battle progresses. Arizona eventually prevails, but Fred knocks her out and rants about how she is ruining his plans. Fred then wakes Oleander up to tell her that she won. While Oleander copies down the inscriptions on the monolith, Fred loots Arizona for all of the items she found along her journey. After the duo leave, Arizona wakes up, severely dazed, and at a loss for what to do next. If the player loses during the third phase of Oleander's fight, the same thing happens, but Fred does not knock Arizona out and talk about how she is ruining his plans.

== Development ==
=== My Little Pony: Fighting Is Magic ===
The My Little Pony: Friendship Is Magic series, while aimed at young girls and their parents, has drawn a large number of adult fans from 15 to 35, typically male, who are often referred to as "bronies". These fans were drawn in by the creativity of Lauren Faust and her team, who wrote the show to appeal across generations. The show's characters, Flash animations, adventure-themed stories, and occasional pop cultural references are considered other draws for the older audience.

Many members of the brony fandom are technology-savvy, a common activity in the fandom being the creation of images of the show's ponies, parodying other commercial works including video games. Fighting Is Magic grew out of a set of images for a hypothetical "Marevel vs. Clopcom" game, parodying the Marvel vs. Capcom fighting game series, created by Anukan, who would later become one of the Mane6 developers. Anukan didn't expect anything to come from these images, but found that at discussion boards, fans were postulating how the various pony characters would translate into fighting games; such as what sorts of moves they would use. One of these users, Nappy, recognized the potential in realizing a complete game, and began the formation of Mane6, including Anukan, Jay Wright, Lucas Ellinghaus, James Workman, and Prominence.

The team decided on using the Fighter Maker 2D game engine, despite having no prior experience with the software. After getting in the basics of having characters hit one another, they discovered that they could get the engine to include wall bounces—the rebounding of a character from walls at the edges of the screen—which according to Ellinghaus, show "the potential for both the game and the team". Much of the development work was spent in trying to achieve certain effects within the Fighter Maker engine, referred to by the team as "taming" the engine.

The game was initially developed as a three button-based fighter, allowing to remain simple to be picked up by players but still offering a variety of combinations of moves, while limiting the amount of animations for the various moves for all characters. The three buttons were designed to mimic the light, medium, and heavy attacks of the Marvel vs. Capcom series. However, the development team also wanted to include an EX system like the one in Street Fighter IV where pressing two attack buttons at the same time executes a special move. Within the initial game engine, Fighter Maker, the game would only register two simultaneous button presses if they were within the same processing time frame, which would hinder gameplay. To work around this, the team designed a fourth button, (a "magic" button as described by Mane6), used to have the character remain still while doing a specific activity that would build up an EX meter, such as Twilight Sparkle reading a book. With a full EX meter, the player would then be able to execute special moves with any of the other three buttons.

Character selection screen, in its form at the time of the cease and desist

Mane6 focused initial efforts to build up the six main characters from the show as the initial fighters, but have stated that an expanded roster of up to seventeen characters would be in their planned final version. The game was to be downloadable and free-to-play, with local and online multiplayer modes as well as a story mode. Character-specific moves were to be present in-game. The individual movesets for each character are based not only on how they are represented in the show, but also considering other characters in fighting games to fill out their fighting style. Twilight Sparkle, in the show, is a unicorn with powerful magic abilities, which the Mane6 matched with Akuma from the Street Fighter series, while Rainbow Dash, an aggressive pegasus, was compared with Magneto's playstyle in the Marvel vs. Capcom series. Fluttershy, a timid character within the show, does not fight directly, but instead her animal companions fight for her, creating a playstyle similar to Eddie from Guilty Gear XX or Phoenix Wright in Ultimate Marvel vs. Capcom 3. In another case, Pinkie Pie, a hyperactive pony who is shown to have some fourth wall reality-warping powers in the show, allowed the team to experiment with a wide range of haphazard moves. They had designed one move where Pinkie would use her "party cannon" to launch a present at the opponent, and then she would then pop out of the present at close range. As they were developing the game, Persona 4 Arena was released, in which the character of Kuma/Teddie had a similar move. They realized they were thinking along the same lines as the professional developers and continue to work more of Pinkie's moves based on Teddie's moveset. While these other characters helped to inspire additional moves, the Mane6 team made sure to stay true to the characterization on the show and not introduce moves that would be outside of this, such as Fluttershy herself making an aggressive attack.

After each character's moveset was tested and refined based on testing feedback, the team then began to animate each character, first by creating Flash-based animations and then transforming these to sprites needed for Fighter Maker. The team noted that the pony shape of the characters proved an additional challenge both visually and for the engine. With most fighting games, players can easily identify heads, arms, and legs, and know where to watch for attacks, but the same was not true for the ponies. They proceeded to add effects like sparks on the attacking character and opponent responses to help players recognize attacks. In terms of the engine, the hitboxes for the ponies were more horizontal than vertical as would be the case with humanoid fighter characters, and they had to work around this in the engine to accurately model attacks. Additionally the more horizontal shapes of the characters limited how much of the fighting stage space they could use; they overcame this within the game by using a 3/4ths view of the characters that shortened their on-screen lengths giving them more space to work with.

==== Release ====
The team had released early pre-alpha gameplay footage as they added the main six characters to the game. Though the team had expected the game to be popular within the brony community, the game has been noticed by other fighting game players through these videos. The team was invited to demonstrate their game at the July 2012 Evolution Championship Series by one of its founders, Joey "MrWizard" Cuellar, as part of other indie fighting games. For the 2013 Evolution series, the game was one of seventeen nominees for the "Player's Choice" slot in the main competition.

Though the game is an unlicensed work of Hasbro's My Little Pony franchise, the Mane6 team did not receive any cease and desist notices from the company until February 8, 2013. Like much of the rest of the Internet phenomenon surrounding Friendship is Magic, Hasbro had been mostly tolerant; allowing episodes of the show along with parodies and mashups of the works to be redistributed freely across the Internet. This helped to create a participatory culture that has drawn a broader audience to the show, even going as far as to say they have no intentions of ever filing takedown notices as they see this as "Free Advertising and spreading". The Mane6 had taken no monetary donations for their work and planned to keep the game as a free release. Further, while a fighting game, they did not show any characters getting wounded, or show any signs of blood, as to keep with the generally nonviolent theme of the show. The Mane6 had stated that even if the project was shut down, they had learned much from the effort to apply towards their next project with original characters, which they were already planning.

==== Cease and desist from Hasbro ====
An unfinished version of the game was leaked to 4chan's /mlp/ board on August 2, 2012. Mane6 responded by terminating their QA program and pushing the project into a closed development cycle. In February 2013, shortly after the 2013 EVO voting selection, Hasbro's lawyers sent a cease and desist letter to the Mane6 team; this was only a few weeks before they had expected to be completed with the initial version of their game. They obeyed the cease and desist letter, halting all production and removing all assets from their website, while Mane6 attempted to enter legal negotiations with Hasbro. Artist Elosande resigned from the team. The team also sought legal advice to fight the cease and desist but were told it would be an expensive battle. Mane6 were unable to come to agreements with Hasbro and started to redo the game using new artwork assets. They subsequently renamed the new game to simply Fighting Is Magic. On February 28, 2014, a fandom news site, Equestria Daily, announced the release of a "finished" version of the game. Using a combination of the Mane6 team's unfinished build and fan-made contributions, this version features all main six characters of the television show as playable, as well as new stages and multiplayer capability. Now known as Fighting is Magic: Tribute Edition, the game is openly available for download and play.

=== Reworking as Them's Fightin' Herds ===
Promotional artwork of the game's first six playable characters, based on Lauren Faust's designs. From left going clockwise: Oleander the unicorn with her Unicornomicon, Tianhuo the longma, Velvet the reindeer, Paprika the alpaca, Arizona the cow, and Pom the lamb with one of her puppies.

With no legal option to continue to use the My Little Pony characters, the Mane6 team opted to keep most of their work to date and reworked the game with new art assets, retaining the theme of four-legged creatures. Faust herself supported the fan effort, understanding the "irony" of a fighting game based on a show about friendship, but appreciated that "the original version of the game was that they made the Ponies fight in character" without resorting to typical fighter elements like weapons, and praising the animations that the team has already built. On hearing of the cease and desist, Faust contacted the team, offering to provide some of her time to create new characters for their game, and her official involvement with the project was announced at the end of February. The team accepted her offer; developer Jay Wright noted that "you can't copyright Lauren's distinctive style", and that while the game will still be unique, it will likely still carry the spirit of My Little Pony. According to Faust, she was happy to provide "my little part to help Mane6 finish up this game in a way that stays true to the spirit of the original—but in a way that can freely be shared". Faust also helped to develop the story and setting for the game. She noted that the common story concept for fighting games, where the characters would be fighting to be the champions of a tourney, was overused, and instead designed one around where the individual characters have already been determined to be champions from their individual tribes, and now are fighting each other for the key, each believing it is their destiny to obtain and use the key against the Predators.

The characters in the game remain four-legged as with the My Little Pony version, which Mane6 developer Francisco Copado believes is a first for a fighting game. Silhouette teaser images released by the Mane6 team showed a trio of four-legged non-pony characters as preliminary designs for the new game, while as of April 2013, three additional characters were still in development.

The Mane6 team also gained contributions from the Lab Zero Games studio, the same developers of Skullgirls. Lab Zero has also developed a fighting game engine, named the Z-Engine, from scratch for their own title. While others had contacted Lab Zero to use the Z-Engine for other fighting games, the studio was drawn to the work of the Mane6 who, according to Lab Zero's Mike Zaimont, had shown a high degree of competence of what made a good fighting game compared to other efforts, and wanted to support their work. Lab Zero used an Indiegogo crowd-sourcing effort to gain development funds, and having readily cleared their initial target of $150,000 and with additional stretch goals of new characters and content for their game, included a $725,000 target that would allow Mane6 to use and distribute the Z-Engine for free as part of their new game, and challenged the brony community to help towards that via online donation. The goal was met on the final day of the funding campaign, which was on March 27, 2013. The Z-engine allowed the Mane6 team to expand beyond the limitations of Fighter Maker, though they kept some of the conventions learned from working with Fighter Maker, such as the use of 3/4rd views to reduce the horizontal lengths of the four-legged characters. The Skullgirls engine also brought in the open-source networking code GGPO ("Good Game Peace Out"), designed specifically for overcoming known limitations of playing fighting games online. GGPO uses a system called "rollback" that delays the game's response to the user's input slightly, masked by character animations, coupled with predictive behavior to appear to give zero-latency gameplay for players against online opponents.

In August 2015, the Mane6 revealed the revamped title, Them's Fightin' Herds, which was suggested by Craig McCracken. They announced that they would be starting an Indiegogo campaign starting on September 21, 2015, seeking to raise US$436,000 to complete the game. The funding was successful with a final funding amount of US$586,346, meeting the stretch goals to offer the game on OS X and Linux computers alongside Microsoft Windows, and the introduction of a seventh playable character, a goat, stages and stories based on that character.

By early February 2018, the Mane6 affirmed the game's early access release on February 22, 2018. They had gained support from Humble Bundle for publishing; in turn, Humble Bundle had reached out to publishers of other fighting game developers to bring themed assets into Them's Fightin' Herds, including Guilty Gear Xrd, BlazBlue: Central Fiction, and Skullgirls. On December 1, 2021, the partnership between Mane6 and Humble Bundle had ended. On January 20, 2022, Mane6 announced that they were purchased by and entered a publishing deal with Maximum Games.

=== Post-release ===
The game was released on April 30, 2020. Only the first chapter of the game's story mode was available at launch, though all six characters were fully playable in the game's competitive modes. Mane6 intended to continue to support the game and add additional chapters to the story mode following release. Art and gameplay for Shanty was showcased by Mane6 around August 2020, though they had no planned date when the character would be released. Shanty was released on March 25, 2021, alongside the Linux version of the game. A macOS port was released on October 27, 2021. On May 25, 2022, it was announced that the game would be released for home consoles later in the year. On August 18, 2022, it was announced that versions for Nintendo Switch, PlayStation 4, PlayStation 5, Xbox One, and Xbox Series X/S would be made available on October 18.

On November 22, 2023, Mane6 and Modus announced that, following the release of the last season pass character in 2024, the game would be ending active development, with the remaining story chapters being canceled. The announcement was met with backlash from the player community, as the story mode had been part of the planned development since its crowd-funding plans. The Mane6 development team was fired from the project shortly thereafter. The final DLC characters, Baihe and Nidra, were released in February 2024 but the update contained numerous bugs, which also prompted a backlash from players and fans.

In September 2025, the publishing rights to the game, alongside Diesel Legacy: The Brazen Age (another fighting game developed and published by Maximum Games/Modus), were acquired by Gameplay Group International, a brand new publishing label with a specific aim to acquire and continue development of "cancelled" games. Founder and chief creative office Victor Lugo has stated that "Our initial slate of fighting games is especially close to my heart", though Gameplay Group has yet to provide any information on what they intend to do with the game.

== Reception ==
Reception

Aggregate score
Aggregator	Score
Metacritic	PS5: 83/100; XSXS: 80/100

Review scores
Publication	Score
IGN	8/10
Nintendo Life	8/10
Nintendo World Report	8/10
TouchArcade	4.5/5

Them's Fightin' Herds received "generally favorable" reviews according to review aggregator website Metacritic.

IGN gave the game a score of 8 out of 10.

One of the challenges that the Mane6 developers have stated with getting people to play the game is the stigma of its basis on the My Little Pony foundations and association with the brony fandom; however, Mane6 president Aaron Stavely said that once they were been able to get fighting game players to try out the game, they have generally seen them impressed with the game and walk away with positive feedback.

Them's Fightin' Herds was supposed to be one of four games used for the open tournaments in the revamped online version of Evo 2020, which was cancelled. Both Them's Fightin' Herds and Skullgirls were used for the online events due to their capable forms of online play enabled by GGPO, along with Mortal Kombat 11 and Killer Instinct, which were both developed with internal versions of rollback netcodes.

During the 24th Annual D.I.C.E. Awards, the Academy of Interactive Arts & Sciences nominated Them's Fightin' Herds for "Fighting Game of the Year", which was ultimately awarded to Mortal Kombat 11 Ultimate.

== See also ==
- Equestria at War
- Legends of Equestria
