= Equestria at War =

Total conversion mod for Hearts of Iron IV

- Steam Workshop icon
- Developer: Equestria at War Team
- Composers: Acryliks; Red Spark; Resonant Tonality; Zvykar
- Series: Hearts of Iron IV
- Engine: Clausewitz Engine
- Platform: Microsoft Windows, macOS, Linux
- Release: June 30, 2017
- Genres: Grand strategy, real time strategy, simulation
- Modes: Single-player, multiplayer, co-op

Equestria at War is a total conversion mod for the grand strategy video game Hearts of Iron IV (2016) based on the animated television series My Little Pony: Friendship Is Magic. Set in a darker version of its fantasy world, it replaces the base game's map with three new continents inhabited by various sapient races featured in the show.

Like the base game, the player takes control of a country and guides it through conflicts which occur in the world. Instead of World War II, the world's primary conflict is a Changeling invasion of Equestria with the goal of continental domination.

The mod has been received positively by critics, and ranks highly among total conversions for Hearts of Iron IV. As of July 2025, the mod had approximately 252,000 subscribers on the Steam Workshop.

== Setting ==
Like Friendship is Magic, the setting of Equestria at War is a magical fantasy world inhabited by sapient creatures of different races, such as ponies. Set after the return of Nightmare Moon, an industrial revolution has taken place with the world becoming increasingly characterized by political instability, social strife, corruption and war.

The continent of Equus plays host to Equestria, the preeminent superpower, which is struggling to adapt its long-held ideals of Friendship and Harmony to meet the challenges of an increasingly dangerous world. It borders the insurgent Changeling Lands, which seeks to avenge its humiliation after a failed decapitation attack on Equestria a few years earlier, (Note: As depicted in the Friendship is Magic episode "A Canterlot Wedding".) and establish a continental hegemony for itself. Northeast of Equestria is the breakaway province of Stalliongrad, which gained its independence in a communist revolution sparked by a famine exacerbated by Equestrian mismanagement.

On the continent of Griffonia, the once dominant Griffonian Empire has been reduced to a rump state after a series of revolutions and secessions, with a dying Emperor and an heir too young to rule. The collapse of the Empire gave way to many new griffon states in a violent aftermath, as well as triggering a continental economic crisis. Regional powers such as Wingbardy and Aquileia compete to fill the ensuing power vacuum. To the east in the Riverlands region, primarily inhabited by ponies and other minorities, countries which form the defensive River Coalition debate the alliance's future after the collapse of their main adversary.

To the south lies the continent of Zebrica. The Storm King, who united the yetis of the south and marched north with the intent of launching an invasion of Equestria, was defeated by Hippogriffia before he could cross the sea. Despite this, large parts of the continent, particularly the central zebra states and the feline Kingdom of Abyssinia, are reeling from the economic effects of their recent conquest by his forces. To the east lies the Realm of Kiria, home of the kirin race. The country is ending a century of self-imposed isolation from the outside world, known as the Silence. As it opens up to the world, Kiria gears up for an ambitious but volatile modernization process aiming to bring the nation into the current age.

== Gameplay ==
The core country management gameplay of Hearts of Iron IV is retained in Equestria at War. However, the mod heavily modifies and replaces the base game's map, factions, technologies, and characters. Players can control countries inhabited by different species from My Little Pony and wage wars against other states. The world map is replaced with three new continents based on the My Little Pony universe: Equus, Griffonia and Zebrica.

In order to better reflect the setting, the base game's ideologies are altered. The existing democratic and fascist ideologies are replaced with "harmonic" and "supremacist" ideologies respectively. Additionally, the existing technology trees are expanded with options for magical equipment, and new technology trees to represent the racial and magical abilities of the fantasy races are introduced.

One of the central conflicts in Equestria at War is between Equestria and the changelings.

== Development ==
The mod was initially launched on June 30, 2017. The development team's "Knights and Flowers" update, announced on April 1, 2018, added the continent of Griffonia and new playable countries. Version 2.0, "Shores of Zebrica", was released on July 31, 2022, and added the continent of Zebrica. Version 2.2, released in September 2023, expanded faction development trees and technology options.

== Reception ==
Adrian Werner of Gamepressure praised the mod's ambition, calling it "surprisingly enjoyable." EIP Gaming included it in a 2025 selection of recommended Hearts of Iron IV mods, and it placed seventh in the players' vote for Mod DB's 2023 Mod of the Year awards.

== See also ==
- Kaiserreich
- Legends of Equestria
- Pony Town
- Them's Fightin' Herds
