= Def Jam Rapstar =

2010 video game

- Developers: 4mm Games, Terminal Reality
- Publisher: Konami
- Platforms: PlayStation 3, Wii, Xbox 360
- Release: NA: October 5, 2010; EU: November 26, 2010
- Genre: Music
- Modes: Single-player, multiplayer

Def Jam Rapstar is a music video game based on rapping, developed by 4mm Games and Terminal Reality. It was released on October 5, 2010 in North America and on November 26, 2010 in Europe.

== Gameplay ==
Def Jam Rapstar is a rap-themed karaoke game. There are two modes, Career and Party modes. The Career mode is in five stages. Each stage has eight tracks for the player to master, including a New Song Challenge which is unlocked as the player progresses through the stage. The Party mode allows players to simply pick an individual song and perform it.

== Development ==
Executive Vice President Paul Coyne of 4mm Games said, "Internally, we used [Get on da Mic] as the architectural model of how not to do Def Jam Rapstar."

In using censored radio versions of every song in its setlist, Rapstar becomes the first Def Jam game to be rated Teen by the ESRB since Def Jam Vendetta. Players are also not obligated to sing profanities, and missing any does not affect their score.

== Reception ==
Reception

Aggregate scores
Aggregator	Score		
Aggregator	PS3	Wii	Xbox 360
GameRankings	76%	70%	76%
Metacritic	75/100	65/100	74/100

Review scores
Publication	Score		
Publication	PS3	Wii	Xbox 360
Eurogamer	N/A	N/A	7/10
Game Informer	7.75/10	N/A	N/A
GameRevolution	B−	N/A	B−
GameSpot	7.5/10	6.5/10	7.5/10
GameTrailers	N/A	N/A	7/10
GameZone	8/10	N/A	8/10
Giant Bomb	4/5	N/A	4/5
IGN	7.5/10	N/A	7.5/10
Official Nintendo Magazine	N/A	63%	N/A
Official Xbox Magazine (US)	N/A	N/A	7/10
The Guardian	N/A	N/A	4/5

The PlayStation 3 version received "generally favorable reviews", while the Xbox 360 and Wii versions received "mixed or average reviews" according to video game review aggregator Metacritic.

The Guardian gave the Xbox 360 version four stars out of five and called it "an absolute must. If you've found yourself mouthing the words to A Milli on the tube, there's a huge amount of fun to be had here. And while it doesn't have the universal appeal of its more mainstream counterparts, the potential of its online feature means it could well become a huge sleeper success."

IGN gave the Xbox 360 and PS3 versions of the game a 7.5 out of 10. They praised the scoring accuracy and the features, but criticized the censorship in the songs as the game went for a "Teen" rating.

== See also ==
- Karaoke Revolution
- SingStar
- Battle Rap Stars
