= HappinessCharge PreCure! the Movie: The Ballerina of the Land of Dolls =

2014 film by Chiaki Kon

- Theatrical release poster
- Kanji: 映画 ハピネスチャージプリキュア！人形の国のバレリーナ
- Revised Hepburn: Eiga Hapinesuchāji Purikyua! Ningyō no kuni no barerīna
- Directed by: Chiaki Kon
- Screenplay by: Yoshimi Narita
- Based on: Pretty Cure by Izumi Todo
- Starring: Megumi Nakajima; Megumi Han; Rina Kitagawa; Haruka Tomatsu; Naoko Matsui; Miyuki Koburi
- Cinematography: Yoshiyuki Anzai
- Edited by: Yoshihiro Aso
- Music by: Hiroshi Takaki
- Production company: Toei Animation
- Distributed by: Toei Company, Ltd.
- Release date: October 11, 2014
- Running time: 71 minutes
- Country: Japan
- Language: Japanese

HappinessCharge PreCure! the Movie: The Ballerina of the Land of Dolls (Japanese: 映画ハピネスチャージプリキュア！人形の国のバレリーナ, Hepburn: Eiga Hapinesuchāji Purikyua! Ningyō no Kuni no Barerīna) is a 2014 Japanese animated action science fantasy film based on the Pretty Cure franchise created by Izumi Todo, and its eleventh series, HappinessCharge PreCure!. The film is directed by Chiaki Kon, written by Yoshimi Narita, and produced by Toei Animation. The film was released in Japan on October 11, 2014.

The catchcopy of the film is "A bond of love and friendship causes a miracle!" (愛と友情のきずながキセキをおこす!, Ai to yūjō no kizuna ga kiseki o okosu!).

== Plot ==
One day, after Megumi, Hime, Yuko, and Iona help put on a puppet show at a nursery, they come across a living doll named Tsumugi, who claims that her homeland, the Doll Kingdom, is under attack from the Saiarks. As the girls follow Tsumugi to the Doll Kingdom, where they fight against a Windmill Saiark, Blue, who had never heard of the Doll Kingdom before, is attacked by darkness that emerges from his mirror. After defeating the Saiark, the girls are introduced to the Doll Kingdom's prince, Zeke, who Hime gains a crush on, and are taken to the kingdom's castle for a celebratory party. As Yuko and Iona suspect there is something amiss, Seiji is ambushed by Bee Saiarks and transformed into a doll. As more Saiarks suddenly appear, Megumi learns that Tsumugi is the one who created the fake Saiarks and led the Cures into a trap.

It is revealed that Zeke and the other residents of the kingdom are all Tsumugi's dolls. She loved to dance in the real world but one day lost the ability to use her legs, becoming shut off from her friends and family. She was brought into a man-made kingdom by a commander of the Phantom Empire named Black Fang, who stated that if she wanted to continue dancing in the kingdom, she had to defeat the Pretty Cures. After the Cures retreat, Megumi laments that she can't help cure Tsumugi's legs, but the others assure her they can do something if they work together. Together, they try to show Tsumugi what she truly needs to be happy, but they are all ensnared by Black Fang, who reveals that he stole Tsumugi's ability to dance to wield the power born from her despair. Wanting Tsumugi to remember happiness, Zeke and the other dolls sacrifice themselves to free the Cures, allowing Megumi to reach Tsumugi. Stating her firm desire to help her, Megumi helps Tsugumi realize there are things besides dancing that bring her happiness and stops her flow of despair, freeing Seiji and Blue in the process. Black Fang uses the despair he has collected to transform into a more powerful form, which blocks out the power of the Miracle Dress Lights Blue sends to people around the world. However, Megumi's undying determination gives Tsumugi the strength to turn her despair into hope, allowing the power of the Miracle Dress Lights to reach Megumi, who transforms into Super Happiness Lovely and defeats Black Fang alongside the other Cures.

After assuring Megumi that she has the power to make everyone happy, Tsumugi returns to the real world and regains the use of her legs, finally able to dance the way she wants again.

== Voice cast ==
- Megumi Nakajima as Megumi Aino / Cure Lovely
- Megumi Han as Hime Shirayuki / Cure Princess
- Rina Kitagawa as Yuko Ōmori / Cure Honey
- Haruka Tomatsu as Iona Hikawa / Cure Fortune
- Naoko Matsui as Ribbon
- Miyuki Kobori as Glasan
- Shouma Yamamoto as Blue
- Ryōsuke Kanemoto as Seiji Sagara
- Sachiko Kojima as Miyo Masuko
- Takuya Matsumoto as Saiark
- Yui Horie as Tsumugi Orihara (織原 つむぎ, Orihara Tsumugi), a girl who wishes to become a ballerina dancer. She lost functionality of her legs because of Black Fang, who deceived her to stay in the Doll Kingdom, where she could dance again, in exchange for defeating the Pretty Cure. However, he secretly planned to absorb her despair to fuel his power. Ota based Tsumugi's character design on Horie herself.
- Daisuke Ono as Prince Zeke (ジーク王子, Jiiku Ouji), a prince from the Doll Kingdom who has feelings for Tsumugi. It is later revealed that he is one of Tsumugi's dolls.
- Toshiyuki Morikawa as Black Fang (ブラックファング, Burakku Fangu), the main antagonist of the film and an elite commander of the Phantom Empire. A demonic man who created the Doll Kingdom to deceive Tsumugi and make her stay there. He was responsible for taking away Tsumugi's ability to use her legs to feed off her despair and fuel his power. He is ultimately defeated by Cure Lovely in her Super Happiness Lovely form. As a character, he was described as an "overwhelming bad guy", "zero familiarity". and "a partner who can be beaten in a row".
- Funassyi (ふなっしー, Funasshī) as himself, appearing in the prologue "Funassyi Show", where he is attacked by a Saiark. He uses the "Miracle Dress Light" in both the prologue and in the climax to cheer on the Cures, also calling upon the audience to cheer them on.

== Production ==
Chiaki Kon was appointed as the film's director, the first one outside of Toei Animation. Producer Hiroaki Shibata, along with character design/drawing director Kazuhiro Ota, both outside-appointed, said:

It is also interesting to have the outside staff set up in the main, and it also stimulates people inside.

Kon was a fan of the previous Pretty Cure series, and had a dream of directing Pretty Cure. He asked Shibata to produce a performance from the previous year's DokiDoki! PreCure and became the film's director.

Yui Horie, Daisuke Ono, and Toshiyuki Morikawa voice the film-only character Tsumugi, Zeke, and Black Fang. Additionally, Funassyi, an unofficial mascot of the city of Funabashi, Chiba, appears as himself and was appointed as a support captain of this work.

The film had a large-scale tie-up with Yokohama City. In honor of the dolls being the motif of the story, a special display of doll goods was held at the Yokohama Doll House, and stamp rallies were held throughout the city. On October 5, the four seiyu attended a ceremony to light the ferris wheel at Yokohama Cosmo World pink.

At Shinjuku WALD9, a public event was held the day before the film's theatrical release. A free screening of the Futari wa Pretty Cure Max Heart film on Niconico Namahōsō to commemorate the Pretty Cure 10th anniversary; this was the first time a Pretty Cure work was screened there.

=== Music ===
The opening song is HappinessCharge PreCure! WOW!, sung by Sayaka Nakaya, and the ending song is Party Has Come. The insert song is Where Courage is Born (勇気が生まれる場所, Yūki ga Umareru Basho).

==== Single ====
"Where Courage is Born"

Single by Cure Lovely (Megumi Nakajima); Cure Princess (Megumi Han); Cure Honey (Rina Kitagawa); Cure Fortune (Haruka Tomatsu); Tsumugi (Yui Horie)
- B-side: "If You Look to the Blue Sky"
- Released: October 8, 2014
- Genre: J-pop, Anime song
- Length: 19:50
- Label: Marvelous
- Composer: Hiroshi Takaki
- Lyricists: Masaori Koda (#1); Sumiyo Mutsumi (#2)

Where Courage is Born (勇気が生まれる場所, Yūki ga Umareru Basho) is an insert song of the anime film HappinessCharge PreCure! the Movie: The Ballerina of the Land of Dolls released on October 11, 2014. It is sung by four Cures (Nakajima, Han, Kitagawa, and Tomatsu) appearing in the film.

The single was released from Marvelous on October 8. The B-Side is the image song "If You Look to the Blue Sky" by Megumi Aino (Nakajima) and movie-only character Tsumugi (Yui Horie).

==== Overview ====
Producer Hiroaki Shibata wanted to make another Pretty Cure insert song like with DokiDoki! Precure the Movie: Mana's Getting Married!!? The Dress of Hope Tied to the Future the previous year. Director Chiaki Kon agreed to this, and decided to use a song that would heat up the climax battle scene like with Sailor Moon R: The Movie's "Moon Revenge". He also specifically ordered composer Hiroshi Takaki to make the song "contemporary style with a hot feeling".

The songs were recorded in the order of Tomatsu, Nakajima, Kitagawa, and Han. Although they were not asked which scene they were used for after-recording of animation, they were immediately used in which scene when they read the lyrics.

- Tomatsu said: "It's very cool that there are many talks, or there are many overlapping ones."
- Nakajima said: "'Shiawase wo akiramenai!' was a lovely line in the play as it is in the lyrics, and it made it so crowded."
- Kitagawa said: "I felt that while I was singing, I thought that a slightly different [Cure] Honey could be seen from this song."
- Han said: "The message that [Cure] Princess told in the film is the same song ... It is something that four people sing and can not sing without one. [It is] a song that everyone sings together."

Horie said of If You Look to the Blue Sky:

It was very easy to get in because the lyrics were drawn with a film version of the story. It was difficult [for me] to sing as a small child.

The single topped at #59 in the Oricon Singles Chart on October 20, 2014.

===== Track listing =====
1. Where Courage is Born (勇気が生まれる場所, Yūki ga Umareru Basho) (5:01)
  Sung by: Cure Lovely (Megumi Nakajima); Cure Princess (Megumi Han); Cure Honey (Rina Kitagawa); Cure Fortune (Haruka Tomatsu)
  Lyrics： Masaori Koda
  Work and Arrangement： Hiroshi Takaki
  - Insert song of HappinessCharge PreCure! the Movie: The Ballerina of the Land of Dolls
  - Later used as a song in episode 44 of the main series.
2. If You Look to the Blue Sky (見上げれば青い空, Miagereba Aoisora) (4:56)
  Sung by: Cure Lovely (Megumi Nakajima); Tsumugi (Yui Horie)
  Lyrics: Sumiyo Mutsumi
  Work and Arrangement: Hiroshi Takaki
3. Where Courage is Born (Original Karaoke) (勇気が生まれる場所（オリジナル・カラオケ）, Yūki ga Umareru Basho (Orijinaru Karaoke)) (5:01)
4. If You Look to the Blue Sky (Original Karaoke) (見上げれば青い空（オリジナル・カラオケ）, Miagereba Aoisora (Orijinaru Karaoke)) (4:56)

==== Soundtrack ====
The film's original soundtrack was released on October 11, 2014. Hiroshi Takaki recorded the soundtrack. In addition, the movie-sized theme song is included. A jacket-size sticker was bundled as a first-time limited-time offer. It topped at #254 at the Oricon Albums Chart on October 20, 2014.

Track listing
No.	Title	Length
1.	"Appear in a Pinch! HappinessCharge PreCure! (ピンチに登場!ハピネスチャージプリキュア!, Pinchi ni tōjō! Hapinesuchājipurikyua!)"	2:10
2.	"Pretty Cure・Happiness Big Bang!! (プリキュア・ハピネスビッグバーン!!, Purikyua hapinesubiggubān!!)"	1:42
3.	"The Invitation From Within The Mirror (鏡の中からの誘い, Kagami no naka kara no sasoi)"	0:25
4.	"The Fun Puppet Show (楽しい人形劇, Tanoshī ningyō geki)"	1:17
5.	"Dreaming Hime (夢みるひめ, Yumemiru Hime)"	0:37
6.	"The Mysterious Doll (ふしぎな人形, Fushigi-na ningyō)"	1:17
7.	"HappinessCharge PreCure! WOW! (Movie size) (ハピネスチャージプリキュア!WOW! (映画size), Hapinesuchāji Purikyua! WOW! (Eiga size))"	1:32
8.	"Disturbing Shadow (不穏な影, Fuon'na kage)"	0:38
9.	"PreCure! Kururin Mirror Change! -charge up version- (プリキュア!くるりんミラーチェンジ! -charge up version-, Purikyua! Kururin Mirāchenji! -charge up version-)"	1:58
10.	"Defeat! The Windmill Saiark (倒せ!風車サイアーク, Taose! Kazaguruma saiāku)"	2:08
11.	"Prince Zeke on the White Horse (白馬の王子ジーク, Hakuba no ōji jīku)"	1:16
12.	"PreCure Parade (プリキュア・パレード, Purikyua Parēdo)"	1:14
13.	"Tsumugi's Dance (Flower Waltz) (つむぎの踊り (花のワルツ), Tsumugi no odori (Hana no Warutsu))"	0:39
14.	"Doll Castle's Ball (Vienna Essence) (ドール城の舞踏会 (ウィーン気質), Dōru-jō no budōkai (Wīn katagi))"	3:25
15.	"Even though I did my best... (がんばったけど私は..., ganbattakedo watashi wa...)"	1:05
16.	"The Attacking Saiark (襲いくるサイアーク, Osoi kuru saiāku)"	2:10
17.	"For Tsumugi's sake (つむぎのために, Tsumugi no tame ni)"	1:01
18.	"My Legs Cannot Dance (踊れない足, Odorenai ashi)"	1:09
19.	"Tsumugi's Kingdom of Dreams (つむぎの夢の王国, Tsumugi no yume no ōkoku)"	3:03
20.	"Unfulfilled Feelings (届かぬ思い, Todokanu omoi)"	1:36
21.	"That's what HappinessCharge PreCure is! (それがハピネスチャージプリキュア!, Sore ga Hapinesu Chāji Purikyua!)"	2:02
22.	"Black Fang's Temptation (ブラックファングの誘惑, Burakku Fangu no yūwaku)"	0:56
23.	"Let's Go Back Together (いっしょに帰ろう, Issho ni kaerou)"	1:04
24.	"Spinning the Unhappy Thread (紡がれる不幸の糸, Tsumugareru fukō no ito)"	2:58
25.	"Help Tsumugi! (つむぎを助けて!, Tsumugi o tasukete!)"	2:43
26.	"The Counterattack of Rage (怒りの反撃, Ikari no Hangeki)"	2:00
27.	"Because We're Friends (友だちだから, Tomodachi dakara)"	2:57
28.	"Black Fang's Threat (ブラックファングの脅威, Burakku Fangu no kyōi)"	2:25
29.	"PreCure Ganbare! (プリキュアがんばれ!, purikyua ganbare!)"	1:40
30.	"Happiness for Everyone (ハピネスをみんなに, Hapinesu o min'na ni)"	1:35
31.	"Keep Up With Your Dreams (夢を追いつづけて, Yume o oi tsudzukete)"	1:01
32.	"Party Has Come (Movie size) (パーティ ハズカム (映画size), Pāti Hazukamu (eiga size))"	2:03

== Release ==
The film was released in theaters in Japan on October 11, 2014. The Blu-ray and DVD were released on March 18, 2015. On March 30, the special-version DVD and regular-version DVD charted at 55 and 139 in the Oricon DVD Chart, while the BR charted at 28 in the Blu-ray Disc Chart.

== Reception ==
It was released on 210 screens nationwide, and in its first two days (October 11 and 12), 85,396 people attended the film. With a revenue of ¥1389600, this was the first time Kōgyō Tsūshin ranked a Pretty Cure film at fifth-place in film attendance. In addition, it ranked #2 in the first-day satisfaction ranking by Pia's survey. However, box office revenues were sluggish, with the final office revenue ending at ¥530 million.

It was analyzed by Otapol and Itmedia's Netolab division that several issues hindered people from splitting income for the film, thus causing the film's box-office decline:

- It was released during the consecutives holidays in early-October instead of the usual late-October;
- It was released at the same time as athletic meet season and the approach and landing of Typhoon Vongfong;
- The massive success of Frozen in Japan;
- Two popular anime – Yo-kai Watch and Aikatsu! – had successful film adaptations during the 2014 holiday season.
