= List of Tsukihime characters =

This is a list of characters in Tsukihime, as well as Melty Blood.

== Main characters ==
Shiki Tohno (遠野 志貴, Tōno Shiki)
Voiced by: Kenji Nojima (Melty Blood, Carnival Phantasm), Ryōsuke Kanemoto (remake), Kenichi Suzumura (anime series) (Japanese); Steve Staley (English)
A high school boy possessing mystical eyes which allow him to see the "Lines of Death" which, once traced, destroys whatever object or being they are on but only when he takes his glasses off. An accident eight years prior to the game's events resulted in him being excommunicated from the Tohno clan by his father, leading him to live with one of the branch families, the Arima (有間) clan. At the beginning of the game, he returns home at the behest of his sister, Akiha after their father's death. He wields a switchblade with his Eyes to kill supernatural enemies. In later storyline, where he was revealed to be adopted to Tohno clan, Shiki's real name was Shiki Nanaya (七夜 志貴, Nanaya Shiki), a sole survivor of his clan, a group of demon hunting assassins who inherited the same mystical eyes as him. The injuries from an accident eight years prior and some time after his adoption has permanently damaged his mystical eyes, where they are permanently activated while having the memory of his past life as a Nanaya sealed. During the events of Tsukihime, the seal on his cold blooded Nanaya instinct starts to progressively break.
Arcueid Brunestud (アルクェイド・ブリュンスタッド, Arukweido Buryunsutaddo)
Voiced by: Ryoka Yuzuki (Melty Blood, Carnival Phantasm, Fate/EXTRA), Ikumi Hasegawa (remake), Hitomi Nabatame (anime series) (Japanese); Michelle Ruff (English)
A mysterious princess of a born vampire race known as the "True Ancestor". She lacks some vampiric qualities, such as needing to consume blood to survive (although she suppresses the desire) and being nocturnal. She seems to be quite knowledgeable about many things, but is portrayed as very naïve when it comes to modern ideas. She is killed by Shiki in their first encounter, but regenerates, and recruits him to hunt the Apostle Ancestor-type vampires.
Her design was loosely based on an image of a model in a fashion magazine that Takashi Takeuchi had read in 1995. Online research suggested that this person was Amanda Dyer, a Canadian model; Dyer herself would later confirm this.
Ciel (シエル, Shieru)
Voiced by: Kumi Sakuma (Melty Blood, Carnival Phantasm), Kaede Hondo (remake), Fumiko Orikasa (anime series) (Japanese); Wendee Lee (English)
An upperclassman of Shiki and the sole member of the Japanese tea ceremony club. She is also a secret agent of the Church's "Burial Agency" created to exterminate heresy. Her birth name was Elesia (エレイシア, Ereshia). Before joining the agency, when she was sixteen years old, she used to be the seventeenth host of a certain Dead Apostle. However, even after Arcueid freed her from the Dead Apostle’s influence, Ciel was cursed with immortality and will continue to live as long as the Dead Apostle does.
Akiha Tohno (遠野 秋葉, Tōno Akiha)
Voiced by: Hitomi (Melty Blood, Carnival Phantasm), Shino Shimoji (remake), Shizuka Itō (anime series) (Japanese); Julie Ann Taylor (English)
Shiki's sister, assumed the responsibility as the family's head and acquired the knowledge, behavior, and etiquette for an appropriate noble family. She has mixed feelings about her brother Shiki, whom she has been estranged with for seven years, and seeks him to live like an upper-class man.
Once Shiki's revealed to have been adopted into the Tohno family and is merely a human, Akiha and her blood family are revealed to be half-demons who wield the "Crimson Red Vermillion" (紅赤朱, Kurenai Sekishu), a cursed demon's blood which not only grants them pyrokinetic abilities but also changes their hair color and enhances their physical capabilities. However, those who have succumbed to the curse also lose their sanity, excluding those who have inherited willpower such as Akiha, certain members of the Arima, and the last surviving member of Kishima (軋間) clan.
Hisui (翡翠)
Voiced by: Miyu Matsuki (Melty Blood, Carnival Phantasm), Kana Ichinose (remake), Yumi Kakazu (anime series) (Japanese); Kate Higgins (English)
The younger of the twin maids in the Tohno mansion and is a childhood friend of Shiki. She attends Shiki when he comes back to the Tohno mansion. She acts cold and unfeeling, but it is only an act to hide her kinder nature.
Kohaku (琥珀)
Voiced by: Naoko Takano (Melty Blood, Carnival Phantasm), Yūki Kuwahara (remake), Kana Ueda (anime series) (Japanese); Kari Wahlgren (English)
The older of the twin maids in the Tohno mansion and is always seen to be smiling and cheerful. She is gifted with medicine. Beneath her warm demeanor, Kohaku hides a traumatic past, causing her and Hisui to switch personalities in the present.
Len (レンズ, Ren)
Voiced by: Kaori Mizuhashi (Melty Blood, Carnival Phantasm), Kaori Ishihara (remake)
A succubus familiar who has an ability to create dream worlds and can shape shift into a normal black cat. She was once belonged to Arcueid, before eventually reside at Tohno Manor. Serving as a main viewpoint heroine of Kagetsu Tohya, set after the event of Tsukihime, she uses her dream manipulation put Shiki into slumber to keep him alive, until a mix between Shiki's psyche and her power goes horribly wrong that created two his worst nightmares. However, Shiki manage to solve his situations to face his fears, before ultimately made pacts with Len to be his familiar. She will return to play a major role in upcoming Melty Blood Twi-Lumina.

== Recurring characters ==
Aoko Aozaki (蒼崎 青子, Aozaki Aoko)
Voiced by: Kotono Mitsuishi (Melty Blood, Carnival Phantasm), Haruka Tomatsu (remake), Akiko Kimura (anime series) (Japanese); Karen Strassman (English)
A mysterious vagabond sorceress, who gives Shiki glasses that allow him to suppress his Mystic Eyes from its ongoing activation. She also appears in Witch on the Holy Night, a prequel to Tsukihime franchise, particularly connected to its remake timeline.
Arihiko Inui (乾 有彦, Inui Arihiko)
Voiced by: Makoto Furukawa (remake), Takahiro Sakurai (anime series) (Japanese); Dave Wittenberg (English)
Shiki's best friend and classmate, who is frequently absent from school.
Satsuki Yumizuka (弓塚 さつき, Yumizuka Satsuki)
Voiced by: Omi Minami (Melty Blood, Carnival Phantasm), Minami Tanaka (remake), Kaori Tanaka (anime series) (Japanese); Carrie Savage (English)
Shiki's classmate. In the Far-side routes, she becomes a Dead Apostle.
NRVNQSR Chaos (ネロ・カオス, Nero Kaosu) (Note: The Hebrew form of the Greek form of "Nero Caesar"; per gematria, this has a value of 666, the number of the beast—see SCM Core Text New Testament, Richard Cooke, SCM Press, 2009, p. 310)
Voiced by: Jouji Nakata (Melty Blood, Carnival Phantasm), Kenta Miyake (anime series) (Japanese); Jamieson Price (English)
A Dead Apostle and the secondary antagonist of the Near-side routes in original game. In the remake of Near-side routes, he is a minor character. His real name was Fabro Rowan (ファブロ・ロワン, Faburo Rowan).
Michael Roa Valdamjong (ミハイル・ロア・バルダムヨォン, Mihairu Roa Barudamuyon)
Voiced by: Ken Narita (Melty Blood, Carnival Phantasm, Fate/Grand Order Drama CD), Yōhei Azakami (remake), Hiroyuki Yoshino (anime series) (Japanese); Kirk Thornton (English)
An 800-year-old Dead Apostle who uses reincarnation through possessing his current host as a path to immortality. His seventeenth host was Ciel. He is the main antagonist for the Near-side Routes.
Shiki Tohno (遠野 四季, Tōno Shiki) (Note: In English, Shiki's name is typically written in either italics or all-caps to distinguish him from the main protagonist, as their names are spelled with different kanji characters in Japanese.)
Voiced by: Yōhei Azakami (remake), Hiroyuki Yoshino (anime series) (Japanese); Kirk Thornton (English)
Akiha's older brother, and the protagonist’s adoptive brother. He is also Roa’s current eighteenth host. The main antagonist in the Far-side routes.
Neco-Arc (猫アルク／ネコアルク, Neko Aruku)
Voiced by: Ryoka Yuzuki (Melty Blood, Carnival Phantasm), Ikumi Hasegawa (remake)
A small anthropomorphic mascot cat version of Arcueid who occasionally appears alongside a Teacher variant of Ciel as guides for the players who fell into the Bad Ending of a certain route they ended up. She is an interdimensional anthropomorphic alien cat known as Neco Spirit originating from the Great Cat's Village where most of her people's appearances are closely just like her and Arcueid, albeit with few differences in resembling one of their Earth counterparts in different Type-Moon timelines. While often making cameo appearances in Tsukihime-related media, Neco-Arc also appears in other non-Tsukihime media.
Makihisa Tohno (遠野 槙久, Tōno Makihisa)
Voiced by: Kinryū Arimoto (anime series) (Japanese); Michael McConnohie (English)
The late biological father of Akiha and original Shiki Tohno, and a posthumous antagonist of the series. He was also responsible for orchestrated a massacre on the other Shiki’s home clan by sending one of his henchman to kill them except that Shiki, as well as his brutal treatments towards his own blood children and even Kohaku. His death at the hands of his own son, Shiki led the latter to become Roa’s current host.
Kouma Kishima (軋間 紅摩, Kishima Kōma)
Voiced by: Jurota Kosugi (Melty Blood), Daiki Hamano (remake)
A masterwork of Kishima clan and the clan's eldest son. When Makihisa sent him to massacre Nanaya clan, Kouma fought Shiki's biological father Kiri, who took out his eye before Kouma killed him. Kouma spared a young Shiki per Makihisa's order before voluntarily gone into exile as a hermit Buddhist who resides at a mountain. In Kagetsu Tohya, he only appears as one of Shiki's nightmares.
Miyako Arima (有間 都古, Arima Miyako)
Voiced by: Miwa Kouzaki (Melty Blood, Carnival Phantasm), Hisako Kanemoto (remake)
She is adopted cousin of Shiki Tohno and used to live with him until he was taken back to Tohno Mansion. Miyako practices the martial arts of bajiquan.
Kiri Nanaya (七夜 黄理, Nanaya Kiri)
Shiki's late biological father.

== Melty Blood exclusives ==
Sion Eltnam Atlasia (Shion Erutonamu Atorashia)
Voiced by: Rio Natsuki (Melty Blood, Carnival Phantasm), Satomi Akesaka (Under Night In-Birth)
The main heroine of the original timeline Melty Blood series. She is an alchemist of Atlas, who deserted from her pose to hunt down a man who responsible for forcefully awaken her dormant Dead Apostle vampire blood, and cost her friend to sacrifice her life to keep Sion's vampire side in check for moment. Upon learning the vampire she is looking for is at Japan, Sion also happens to find and took in a recently vampirized Satsuki Yumizuka under her care, before eventually resurface to continue her mission where she seeks Shiki Tohno's help, due to his connection with Arcueid.
Sion later appeared in the French-Bread's spiritual successor of the series, Under Night In-Birth, under her middle name Eltnum, which itself created prior to Tsukihime remake series and its associated Melty Blood remake series.
Night of Wallachia (ワラキアの夜, Warakia no Yoru)
Voiced by: Yasunori Masutani
The main antagonist of the first entry of Melty Blood. He was Sion's ancestor named Zepia Eltnam Oberon (ズェピア・エルトナム・オベローン, Zuepia Erutonamu Oberōn), who has gone rogue into insanity that led him to become a Dead Apostle, using the Reality Marble ability called TATARI to cause terrors, and the one who responsible for forcefully awaken Sion's dormant vampire blood.
Mech-Hisui (メカヒスイ, Meka-Hisui)
Voiced by: Miyu Matsuki
A robot counterpart of the original Hisui, created by Kohaku. There are multiple Mech-Hisui units.
White Len (白レン, Shiro Ren)
Voiced by: Kaori Mizuhashi (Melty Blood, Carnival Phantasm), Kaori Ishihara (remake)
Len's doppelganger who inherits her discarded energetic emotion, while being created by Aoko. In original timeline, she was created from the remains of Zepia, as well. In remake, however, White Len's existence will be different.
Riesbyfe Stridberg (Rīzubaife Sutorindovari)
Voiced by: Akeno Watanabe
Sion's partner who died before the first Melty Blood, but revived as a sentient TATARI in Actress Again.
Neco-Arc Chaos (ネコアルク・カオス, Neko Aruku Kaosu)
Voiced by: Jouji Nakata
A Neco Spirit equivalent to Chaos.
Dust of Osiris (オシリスの砂, Oshirisu no Suna)
Voiced by: Rio Natsuki
The main antagonist of Melty Blood: Actress Again. She is Sion from an alternate timeline, where she is fully succumbed to her vampiric side. She is not playable in Current Code 1.07.

Guest characters

Unlike characters from Witch on the Holy Night, these are guest characters, hails from outside Tsukihime timelines. Most of them are second party guests originated from Fate timelines, both Fate prime timeline depicted in both The Garden of Sinners and Fate/Stay Night, and Fate/Grand Order timeline.

- Shiki Ryougi from Fate prime, title, The Garden of Sinners is the only guest in Melty Blood Actress Again and its updates.
- In Melty Blood remake sub-series, starting from Melty Blood: Type Lumina, Saber version of Altria Pendragon from also a Fate prime timeline title, Fate/Stay Night is included, in additions to characters from Fate/Grand Order Shielder version of Mash Kyrielight, Rider version of Ushiwakamaru and Avenger version of Edmond Dantès (under the name "Count of Monte Cristo").

== Remake exclusives ==
Mio Saiki (斎木 みお, Saiki Mio)
Voiced by: Rina Hidaka
A mysterious girl who Shiki meet sometimes in the city.
Gouto Saiki (斎木 業人, Saiki Gōto)
Voiced by: Chikahiro Kobayashi
The head of the Saiki branch family of the Tohno clan, his entire face is wrapped in black bandages due to burns. He looks down on Shiki, who was excommunicated from the Tohno family and hates him. In the original timeline, the Saiki family originally debuted in the sequel Kagetsu Tohya, where the family head (who may be also Gōto) appears as a flashback character related to Shiki’s birth family.
Arach (阿良句(アラク), Araku)
Voiced by: Mamiko Noto
A scientist who claims to be an old acquaintance of Makihisa from the university, due to her closeness with the Tohno family through him, she's been working for Akiha as a consultant in both architectural and medical matters. In Ciel's Route, it appears that Arach has a mysterious connection to the Dead Apostles since the French Incident, with one of them being a spider-themed vampire, leaving Arach's true origins a mystery.
Noel (ノエル, Noeru)
Voiced by: Ai Kayano
A foreign teacher at Shiki's school whose actually a subordinate of Ciel and goes by the alias Noel Aizome (愛染 ノエル, Aizome Noeru). Beneath her demeanor, Noel hides a traumatic past she had been endured since her village in France was destroyed by Roa when Ciel was his host thirteen years ago. In Ciel’s Route of the Near-Side storyline, she becomes a Dead Apostle and engages Shiki and Ciel in a fight. She is executed immediately by Ciel out of misery.
Mario Gallo Bestino (マ－リオゥ・ジャッロ・ベスティーノ, Mario Jarro Besutino)
Voiced by: Ayane Sakura
A young Italian man and the son of Cardinal Laurentis (who's first mentioned in Fate/Extra CCC), Mario is a bishop of the Holy Church despite only being a teenager. He got his nickname “The Puppeteer” due to his gauntlet-like weapon, “Piano Machine”, that allows him to use strings for combat purposes as well as controlling the movements of others (particularly Holy Church nuns, and even Noel in Arcueid's Route) like they were marionettes. He seeks Roa for his knowledge of immortality in order to fix his father’s aging problem, but eventually learns that all Roa's research has long since hit a dead end.
Yuugo Ando (安藤 裕吾, Ando Yugo)
Voiced by: Ryota Asari
One of Mario's direct subordinates.
Karius Berlusconi (カリウス・ベルルスコーニ, Carius Berlusconi)
Voiced by: Shuta Morishima
One of Mario's direct subordinates.
Vlov Arkhangel (ヴローヴ・アルハンゲリ, Vurōvu Aruhangeri)
Voiced by: Kenjiro Tsuda
A Russian Dead Apostle Ancestor who used to be a knight centuries ago, he possesses the ability to manipulate temperature which allows him to generate and project both fire and ice for different purposes. He serves as the secondary antagonist, replacing the role of NRVNQSR Chaos from the original game. He despises Roa, for tricking him into murdering his adopted mother, Zaria Offenbaum (ゼリア・アッヘェンバウム, Zaria Ahheenbaumu). In Ciel’s Route of the Near-Side storyline, he is directly responsible for Noel's downfall, despite his vampire bite not being that deep.
