= HappinessCharge Pretty Cure! =

Japanese anime television series

- HappinessCharge PreCure!
- Cover for the first DVD volume released by Marvelous, featuring the 4 main cures (Lovely, Princess, Honey and Fortune) and their fairy mascots

ハピネスチャージプリキュア! (Hapinesuchāji Purikyua!)
- Genre: Magical girl, science fiction
- Created by: Izumi Todo
- Anime television series
- Directed by: Tatsuya Nagamine
- Produced by: Shigehaki Dohi; Tomoko Takahashi; Hiroaki Shibata
- Written by: Yoshimi Narita
- Music by: Hiroshi Takaki
- Studio: Toei Animation
- Original network: ANN (ABC, TV Asahi)
- Original run: February 2, 2014 – January 25, 2015
- Episodes: 49
- Manga
- Written by: Izumi Todo
- Illustrated by: Futago Kamikita
- Published by: Kodansha
- Magazine: Nakayoshi
- Original run: March 2014 – February 2015
- Video game

HappinessCharge PreCure! Kawarun Collection
- Developer: Bandai Namco Games
- Publisher: Bandai Namco Games
- Genre: Minigame
- Platform: Nintendo 3DS
- Released: July 31, 2014
- Anime film

HappinessCharge PreCure! the Movie: The Ballerina of the Land of Dolls
- Directed by: Chiaki Kon
- Written by: Yoshimi Narita
- Music by: Hiroshi Takaki
- Studio: Toei Animation
- Released: October 11, 2014
- Runtime: 71 minutes

HappinessCharge PreCure! (ハピネスチャージプリキュア!, Hapinesuchāji Purikyua!), also called HappinessCharge Pretty Cure! or Happiness Charge PC, is a 2014 Japanese magical girl anime series produced by Toei Animation, and the eleventh installment in Izumi Todo's Pretty Cure metaseries, released to celebrate the franchise's 10th anniversary. It is directed by Tatsuya Nagamine, who previously directed HeartCatch PreCure!, and written by Yoshimi Narita, who previously wrote for Yes! PreCure 5, with character designs from Masayuki Sato of Air Gear.

It aired in Japan from February 2, 2014 to January 25, 2015, succeeding DokiDoki! Precure in its timeslot. The series' main topic is love, with fashion styles and dance moves as the Cures' motifs. It features trading cards, mirrors, and changing forms as important key elements. It was succeeded by Go! Princess PreCure on February 1, 2015.

== Plot ==
The evil Phantom Empire (幻影帝国, Gen'ei Teikoku), led by its ruler Queen Mirage, and its generals begins its alien invasion of Earth with Choiarks and powerful monsters called Saiarks. Around the world, Pretty Cures are chosen to fight against the Phantom Empire. Hime Shirayuki, an extraterrestrial princess from the Blue Sky Kingdom (ブルースカイ王国, Burū Sukai Ōkoku), which the Phantom Empire conquered, becomes the Pretty Cure Cure Princess, but is too timid to fight.

After receiving a Crystal of Love from the spirit of Earth, Blue, who tells her to find a partner to fight alongside her, Hime goes to the city of Pikarigaoka (ぴかりが丘) and throws the crystal into the air, deciding to partner with whoever it lands on. It lands on Megumi Aino, a kind-hearted girl always looking to help others, who becomes Cure Lovely and is recruited by Hime to fight with her. Along with Cure Honey and Cure Fortune, using the power of the PreCards and their changing forms, they form the Happiness Charge Pretty Cure team to collect the PreCards and protect Earth from the Phantom Empire.

== Characters ==
=== Pretty Cures ===
The Pretty Cures are legendary Warriors of Light chosen by Blue, the spirit of Earth, to protect it from the Phantom Empire. They use the Pretty Change Mirror (プリチェンミラー, PuriChen Mirā), along with cards called PreCards (プリカード, PuriKādo), to transform with the phrase "Pretty Cure Rolling Mirror Change!" (プリキュアくるりんミラーチェンジ!, Purikyua Kururin Mirā Chenji!). Cure Fortune uses the Fortune Piano (フォーチュンピアノ, Fōchun Piano) to transform with the phrase "Pretty Cure Shining Star Symphony!" (プリキュアきらりんスターシンフォニー!, Purikyua Kirarin Sutā Shinfonī!). In addition to transformation, the PreCards can be used to change outfits in and outside of battle, providing new powers and abilities, and are said to grant a wish to those who collect enough of them.

HappinessCharge Pretty Cure, the protagonist team, consists of the four Cures currently active in Pikarigaoka of Japan. Cure Lovely and Cure Princess use the LovePreBrace (ラブプリブレス, RabuPuriBuresu), which allows them to create their own attacks. Cure Honey uses the Triple Dance Honey Baton (トリプルダンスハニーバトン, Toripuru Dansu Hanī Baton), while Cure Fortune, who previously used the Love PreBrace, uses the Fortune Tambourine (フォーチュンタンバリン, Fōchun Tanborin). They can also use the Shining Make Dresser, Axia's true form, to perform their group finishing attack, Innocent Purification. The Cures have another transformation called Innocent Form, with a design that resembles Japanese idols, through the power of the special PreCards. To activate the form, they must have a reason to protect someone they care about.

Together, they introduce themselves as "Infused with happiness! Charged with glee! HappinessCharge Pretty Cure!" (ハピネス注入! 幸せチャージ! ハピネスチャージプリキュア!, Hapinesu Chūnyū! Shiawase Chāji! HapinesuChāji Purikyua!)

Megumi Aino (愛乃 めぐみ, Aino Megumi) / Cure Lovely (キュアラブリー, Kyua Raburī)
Voiced by: Megumi Nakajima

The main protagonist. 14-year-old second-year student at Public Pikarigaoka Academy who strives to help people when they are troubled or depressed, but sometimes inadvertently interferes with their problems. Despite this, she is optimistic and able to see the good in people. She has an interest in fashion, but struggles with fashion sense. Her wish is to cure her mother, who influenced her to help others. After being chosen by Hime's Crystal of Love, she transforms into Cure Lovely. As Cure Lovely, her dark magenta hair turns bright magenta and is worn in a ponytail. She uses the LovePreBrace to attack and transform into the alternate forms Cherry Flamenco (チェリーフラメンコ, Cherī Furamenko), which uses fire-based attacks, Lollipop Hiphop (ロリポップヒップホップ, Roripoppu Hippuhoppu) which uses music-themed attacks, and her Innocent Form. Megumi has two other special forms: Super Happiness Lovely (スーパーハピネスラブリー, Sūpā Hapinesu Raburī) in the movie and Forever Lovely (フォーエバーラブリー, Fōebā Raburī) in the series finale. She introduces herself as "The big love spreading throughout the world! Cure Lovely!" (世界に広がるビッグな愛!キュアラブリー!, Sekai ni hirogaru biggu na ai! Kyua Raburī!) and represents love. As Super Happiness Lovely, she introduces herself as "Infused with happiness! Charged with glee! Super Happiness Lovely!" (ハピネス注入, 幸せチャージ！スーパーハピネスラブリー!, Hapinesu Chūnyū! Shiawase Chāji! Sūpā Hapinesu Raburī!) As Forever Lovely, she introduces herself as "The eternal love illuminating throughout the world! Forever Lovely!!" (世界に照らす永遠の愛！フォーエバーラブリー！！, Sekai ni terasu eien no ai! Fōebā Raburī!!) Her theme color is pink.

Hime Shirayuki (白雪 ひめ, Shirayuki Hime) / Cure Princess (キュアプリンセス, Kyua Purinsesu)
Voiced by: Megumi Han
Born Himelda Window, Cure Queen of the Blue Sky (ヒメルダ・ウィンドウ・キュアクイーン・オブ・ザ・ブルースカイ, Himeruda Windō Kyua Kuīn Obu Za Burū Sukai). A 13/14-year-old extraterrestrial princess of the Blue Sky Kingdom, which the Phantom Empire conquered after she heard a sad voice coming from Axia and decided to open it, freeing them. She became a Pretty Cure to save the Blue Sky Kingdom from the Phantom Empire, though struggled to fight because of her timid nature. After arriving on Earth, she lives with Blue and Ribbon at an embassy in Pikarigaoka and has trouble making new friends because of her shyness. However, after meeting Megumi and becoming her partner, she begins to open up and become more confident. Her wish is to restore her homeland and atone for her mistake. She later develops a temporary crush on Seiji and worries about becoming Megumi's rival for his love, but later finds that she is happier supporting him and Megumi's relationship. As Cure Princess, her dark aqua hair becomes light blue and is worn in twintails. She uses the LovePreBrace to attack and transform into the alternate forms Sherbet Ballet (シャーベットバレエ, Shābetto Baree) and Macadamia Hula Dance (マカダミアフラダンス, Makadamia Fura Dansu), and her Innocent Form. She introduces herself as "The blue wind dancing in the sky! Cure Princess!" (天空に舞う蒼き風!キュアプリンセス!, Tenkū ni mau aoki kaze! Kyua Purinsesu!) and represents courage. Her theme color is blue.
Yuuko Omori (大森 ゆうこ, Ōmori Yūko) / Cure Honey (キュアハニー, Kyua Hanī)
Voiced by: Rina Kitagawa
Megumi's 13/14-year-old classmate and best friend, whose family runs a bento shop. She enjoys cooking and trying different foods and is known for her homemade honey candy that she gives to others to cheer them up. Her wish is to share delicious food with the people she cares about, as she once had a dog and was inspired to cook food for the sake of people's happiness. She first appeared in Pretty Cure All Stars New Stage 3: Eien no Tomodachi before her debut in the series, later revealing herself to be Cure Honey, having received a Crystal of Love from Blue prior to the beginning of the series, and officially joining the team. As Cure Honey, her straight brown hair turns blond and is worn in a ponytail. Her main weapon is the Triple Dance Honey Baton, which has three modes; Microphone Mode for singing soothing melodies that put her enemies in a trance, Ribbon Mode for restraining her opponents with ribbons, and Maracas Mode for healing her allies. Her alternate forms are Popcorn Cheer (ポップコーンチア, Poppukōn Chiā), Coconuts Samba (ココナッツサンバ, Kokonattsu Sanba), and her Innocent Form. She introduces herself as "The light of life flourishing on the earth! Cure Honey!" (大地に実る命の光!キュアハニー!, Daichi ni minoru inochi no hikari! Kyua Hanī!) and represents life. Her theme color is yellow.
Iona Hikawa (氷川 いおな, Hikawa Iona) / Cure Fortune (キュアフォーチュン, Kyua Fōchun)
Voiced by: Haruka Tomatsu
A 14/15-year-old girl from Megumi's neighboring class who is known for her academics and is the main apprentice of her grandfather, the master of the "Hikawa Karate Dojo". She first appears as a Pretty Cure who works alongside her own fairy partner, Glasan, and is powerful and skilled at fighting, though kind to citizens. Unlike the other Cures, who received their powers from Blue, she received her powers from her older sister Maria, who was Cure Tender until Phantom defeated her and trapped her in a mirror. Her wish is to become stronger in order to defeat Phantom and rescue Maria.she is fighting to save her sister. While she resolved to fight independently in her pursuit of Phantom, who is considered her arch-enemy, she warms up to Megumi's idea of teamwork and later reveals her identity to the group. She holds a grudge against Hime for freeing the Phantom Empire from their prison, but during a battle with Phantom, she loses her PreCards and her ability to transform. Hime apologizes to her by giving her PreCards to her to fill her PreCard File, and Iona uses her wish to regain her ability to transform, reconciling with Hime and officially joining the group afterwards. After regaining her transformation, her transformation device is the Fortune Piano and her main weapon is the Fortune Tambourine. Her alternate forms are Anmitsu Komachi (あんみつこまち, Anmitsu Komachi), Pine Arabian (パインアラビアン, Pain Arabian), and her Innocent Form. She introduces herself as "The star of hope that glitters in the night sky! Cure Fortune!" (夜空にきらめく希望の星!キュアフォーチュン!, Yozora ni kirameku kibō no hoshi, Kyua Fōchun!) and represents hope. Her theme color is purple.

=== Blue Sky Kingdom ===
Ribbon (リボン, Ribon)
Voiced by: Naoko Matsui
Hime's mediator, who comes to Japan with her and serves as the fairy partner for her, Hime, and Yuko. Despite her cute appearance, she can be harsh and is more courageous than Hime. She has the ability to convert the positive feelings of those freed from the Phantom Empire's mirrors into PreCards.
Glasan (ぐらさん, Gura-san)
Voiced by: Miyuki Kobori
Iona's fairy partner, who, like Ribbon, can convert positive feelings into PreCards.
Blue (ブルー, Burū)
Voiced by: Shouma Yamamoto
The spirit of Earth, who resembles a young man with light blue hair and is often referred to as "God" (神様, Kami-sama). He travels to different countries to find candidates who could become Pretty Cures, giving them Crystals of Love that grant their powers. He uses magic mirrors to monitor the Pretty Cures and the Phantom Empire from the Cross Mirror Room (クロスミラールーム, Kurosu Mirā Rūmu). Originally from the Blue Sky Kingdom, he comes to Japan with Hime and Ribbon to aid them and the Cures in their fight against the Phantom Empire. He is later revealed to have known Queen Mirage when she was a Pretty Cure and unknowingly caused her descent into evil after he left for his duties as a god. This allowed Red, who is later revealed to be his estranged brother, to take advantage of her anger towards him to manipulate her. After Red is defeated and reconciles with him, Blue entrusts the Cures with protecting Earth before leaving with Red and Mirage to help restore the Red Planet.
King and Queen
Hime's parents and the extraterrestrial rulers of the Blue Sky Kingdom, who, along with its inhabitants, were trapped in mirrors when the Phantom Empire conquered it. After Mirage's defeat, they are freed and reunite with Hime.

=== Phantom Empire ===
The Phantom Empire (幻影帝国, Gen'ei Teikoku) are the main antagonists of the series. Having conquered the Blue Sky Kingdom after Hime released them from Axia (アクシア, Akushia), they use it as their base of operations while invading Earth by having their Saiarks terraform the environment and replace love and happiness with sorrow and misfortune. It is later revealed that Deep Mirror was using them, using Mirage to act through before she is purified. Red then summons the Red Planet in an attempt to conquer the world with his army of Saiarks, but is defeated and repents.

==== Leaders ====
Red (レッド, Reddo) / Deep Mirror (ディープミラー, Dīpumirā)
Voiced by: Kazuhiko Inoue
The main antagonist of the series and the ruler of the Phantom Empire. He is a spirit who once watched over the Red Planet until its people died, causing him to become hateful and aim to turn Earth, which is under the protection of his brother Blue, into a place of hatred. Red assumes the alias of Deep Mirror for most of the series, appearing as a silhouette in a mirror and acting as an advisor to Queen Mirage, giving orders to the commanders. However, his true role in the Phantom Empire is revealed when he intervenes to prevent the commanders from being purified and it is revealed that he manipulated Mirage through her anger towards Blue. After she is purified, Red attacks the Cures directly, brainwashing Seiji to attack the Cures while summoning the Red Planet to attack Earth. After Megumi saves Seiji, Red personally battles the Cures before being defeated by Megumi as Forever Lovely. Afterwards, he reconciles with Blue and leaves to restore the Red Planet with help from Blue and Mirage. He is based on the Magic Mirror from Snow White.
Mirage (ミラージュ, Mirāju) / Queen Mirage (クイーン・ミラージュ, Kuīn Mirāju) / Cure Mirage (キュアミラージュ, Kyua Mirāju)
Voiced by: Mariko Kouda
The secondary antagonist of the series and the queen of the Phantom Empire, who has butterfly-like wings and wields a staff. As the Cures learn, she was a shrine maiden of Pikarigaoka who met Blue 300 years ago and developed feelings for him as she fought with her as Cure Mirage. However, after Blue left her for his duties as a god, she fell under Red's influence after he amplified her anger towards Blue. Her Saiarks creates fog and chaos. After the Cures defeat and purify Mirage, restoring her to her original form, she transforms into Cure Mirage again to help the Pretty Cures stop Red's invasion. She later leaves with Blue and Red to help restore the Red Planet. Mirage's motif is based on the costume worn by Kyary Pamyu Pamyu in the promotional video for Tsukematsukeru.

==== Commanders ====
Mirage's elite minions, whose Saiarks each create a different environment. Namakelder, Hosshiiwa and Oresky form a group called the Oresky Trio (オレスキートリオ, Oresuki Torio), while Phantom and Madam Momere act independently. They have the power to trap people in mirrors to create Saiarks, which take away their love and happiness.

Oresky (オレスキー, Oresukī)
Voiced by: Takehito Koyasu
The leader of the Phantom Empire's three main commanders. He is a strict and egotistical militant and wears glasses resembling a Saiark on his hat. His Saiarks turn the environment into barren wastelands with dark clouds. While he is almost purified, Deep Mirror saves him, and he is fully purified by Cure Fortune during the final battle. His name is derived from the phrase ore suki (俺好き, "I like it") and his motif is based on Ranba Ral from Mobile Suit Gundam. In the finale, he, along with Namakelder and Hosshiwa, are reborn, and he is shown to be a police officer in Pikarigaoka who is seen helping Mitsuya.
Hosshiwa (ホッシーワ, Hosshīwa)
Voiced by: Akemi Okamura
One of the Phantom Empire's three main commanders. Selfish and greedy, she wears an apple-shaped hat and carries an umbrella. Her Saiarks turn the environment into sweets and desserts. While she is almost purified, Deep Mirror saves her, and she is fully purified by Cure Honey during the final battle. Her name is derived from the word hoshii (欲しい, "desired") and her motif is based on Marie Antoinette. In the finale, she, along with Namakelder and Oresky, are reborn, and she is shown to be a kindergarten teacher named Ms. Hoshi.
Namakelder (ナマケルダ, Namakeruda)
Voiced by: Tetsuo Kanao
One of the Phantom Empire's three main commanders. Intelligent and lazy, he has grasshopper antennae and wears a hat and carries a cane. His Saiarks spread mold and are immune to Cure Honey's song. While he is almost purified, Deep Mirror saves him, and he is fully purified by Cure Princess during the final battle. His name is derived from the word namakeru (怠ける, "to laze around") and his motif is based on the grasshopper from The Ant and the Grasshopper. In the finale, he, along with Hosshiwa and Oresky are reborn, and he is shown to be a businessman named Namase (生瀬).

Phanphan (ファンファン, Fanfan) / Phantom (ファントム, Fantomu) / Cure Unlovely (キュアアンラブリー, Kyua Anraburī)
Voiced by: Hirofumi Nojima (Phanphan/Phantom), Megumi Nakajima (Cure Unlovely)
Formerly Cure Mirage's fairy partner Phanphan, he transformed into a human after she fell under Red's influence and became known as Phantom, gaining notoriety as the Pretty Cure Hunter (プリキュアハンター, Purikyua Hantā) by defeating Pretty Cures and sealing them in mirrors in the Pretty Cure Graveyard. His Saiarks turn the environment into amethyst mines and crystal. Phantom holds a grudge against Blue for breaking Mirage's heart, and intends to destroy anyone he sees as harmful to her. Phantom begins to view Cure Fortune as his arch-rival after targeting the Cures, later using his powers to absorb Megumi's shadow and become Cure Unlovely. After the Pretty Cures treat his injuries after losing to him, he begins to have second thoughts as Yuko allows him to return to Mirage's side. Deep Mirror later influences Phantom to attack the Pretty Cures before they purify him to his original form. After the final battle, he chooses to stay with the Pretty Cures on Earth and begins working at Yuko's father's bento shop. His armor was inspired by Monster Hunter.
Madam Momere (マダム・モメール, Madamu・Momeiru)
Voiced by: Kenji Hamada
One of the Phantom Empire's commanders, who is cool-headed and charismatic and has an androgynous appearance. He enjoys seeing people fight rather than helping each other. His Saiarks turn the environment into frozen lands. Unlike the other commanders, who target Pikarigaoka, Momere is assigned to conquer Hawaii and deal with the Aloha Pretty Cure.
Saiark (サイアーク, Saiāku)
Voiced by: Takuya Masumoto
The monsters of the series, who wear sunglasses and scarves and are summoned when a commander of the Phantom Empire traps a human in a dark mirror, reflecting their happiness into darkness and suffering. When they are defeated, the person is freed and their positive feelings are transformed into PreCards by a fairy. Their name is derived from the Japanese word saiaku (最悪, "worst"). While most Saiarks wear scarves reflecting the member of the Phantom Empire that summoned them, Red has his own legion of red Saiarks.
Choiark (チョイアーク, Choiāku)
Voiced by: Takuya Masumoto
The underlings of the Phantom Empire, resembling a weaker form of a Saiark, wearing black suits, white gloves and boots, and red sunglasses. They do not speak proper sentences, only saying 'choi', and take orders from the commanders. Their name is derived from the Japanese word choi (ちょい, "little"). They turn white after being purified by a Pretty Cure's attack in their Form Change.

=== Pikarigaoka residents ===
Seiji Sagara (相楽 誠司, Sagara Seiji)
Voiced by: Ryosuke Kanemoto, Yayoi Sugaya (child)
A 14-year old boy who is Megumi's neighbor and classmate and has been friends with her since childhood, serving as an ally to the Cures after learning that Megumi is a Cure. He is an apprentice at Iona's family "Hikawa Karate Dojo" and enjoys training. Despite being somewhat popular among girls, he claims to have no romantic interest, but secretly has feelings for Megumi. Red later brainwashes Seiji by taking advantage of his feelings of hatred and anger towards Megumi, but she frees him by expressing her own feelings of love towards him for everything he has done for her and her friends.
Miyo Masuko (増子 美代, Masuko Miyo)
Voiced by: Sachiko Kojima
A reporter and the host of the TV show Pretty Cure Weekly, which reports news about Pretty Cures from around the world. Having been saved by a Pretty Cure in the past, she wanted to become one herself and dedicated herself to learning about them. She learns the identities of the HappinessCharge Pretty Cures after Megumi offers to help her become a Cure. Although Blue gave her a Crystal of Love, it did not react to her, which he believes is because she already has a role in this world. She is based on Mika Masuko from Yes! PreCure 5 and, like her, her name is a pun on "mass communication" (マスコミ, masukomi).
Kaori Aino (愛乃 かおり, Aino Kaori)
Voiced by: Kyoko Donowaki
Megumi's mother, who spends time with her while her husband is away on business trips. Despite her frail body and constantly having to take medicine, she maintains a positive attitude and is the one who influenced Megumi to help others.
Masaru Aino (愛乃 勝, Aino Masaru)
Voiced by: Teruaki Ogawa
Megumi's father, who is often away on business trips.
Mao Sagara (相楽 真央, Sagara Mao)
Voiced by: Yayoi Sugaya
Seiji's younger sister.
Hiroko Sagara (相楽 ひろ子, Sagara Hiroko)
Voiced by: Yukiko Iwai
Seiji and Mao's mother. Her work as a courier causes her to not have much time to spend with them, so they usually have dinner with the Aino family.
Yoko Omori (大森 ようこ, Ōmori Yōko)
Voiced by: Mari Adachi
Yuko's mother, whose runs the bento shop "Omori Gohan" with her husband and two daughters.
Takeo Omori (大森 たけお, Ōmori Takeo)
Voiced by: Satoshi Taki
Yuko's father.
Ai Omori (大森 あい, Ōmori Ai)
Voiced by: Asami Yano
Yuko's older sister.
Yonezo Omori (大森 米蔵, Ōmori Yonezō) & Ine Omori (大森 イネ, Ōmori Ine)
Voiced by: Shigeru Ushiyama, Mami Horikoshi
Yuko's grandfather and grandmother. They live and grow rice in the nearby Pikari Mountain, which is directly supplied to "Omori Gohan".
Izumi (和泉)
Voiced by: Yayoi Sugaya
Megumi's homeroom teacher.
Elena Shiina (椎名 えれな, Shīna Erena), Kana Furuta (古田 かな, Furuta Kana), Rei Takano (高野 れい, Takano Rei) & Rin Ishigami (石神 りん, Ishigami Rin)
Voiced by: Mami Ozaki, Asami Yano, Miki Hase & Miyuki Kobori
Megumi's classmates.
Kenta Yamazaki (山崎健太, Yamazaki Kenta)
Voiced by: Tatsuhisa Suzuki
Megumi, Hime, Yuko and Seiji's classmate and a member of the baseball club, who usually has the lowest test scores in their class.
Kazumi (かずみ)
Voiced by: Ayumi Fujimura
Megumi's classmate, who is a member of the karate club and Iona's apprentice.
Yuya Kaido (海藤裕哉, Kaidō Yūya)
Voiced by: Kōki Uchiyama
Seiji's classmate, who wants to date Iona.

=== Other Pretty Cures ===
Happiness Charge is unique from other seasons in that it has multiple active Pretty Cure teams in addition to the main team. Blue has given girls around the world the power to transform into Pretty Cure to fight the Phantom Empire. The teams range in number from one member to multiple members and operate in their own country, although some large countries, such as the United States, have multiple teams. The Cure's outfits are designed around the same theme, but have variations based on their culture. It is unclear how many Cures are active in total, but Phantom later reveals that when he kills a Cure and puts their bodies in a mirror, he sends them to the Pretty Cure Graveyard, where there are over a hundred defeated Cures. After Mirage's defeat, they are freed from the mirrors.

Maria Hikawa (氷川 まりあ, Hikawa Maria) / Cure Tender (キュアテンダー, Kyua Tendā) / Dark Tender (ダークテンダー, Dāku Tendā)
Voiced by: Sanae Kobayashi
Iona's older sister, whom Phantom defeated and trapped in a mirror while protecting Iona from him. Iona used her Pretty Change Mirror to become Cure Fortune. Her disappearance is explained to her friends and family as her being away to study abroad. Later, Mirage mind controls her and sends her to fight her sister and the Cures as Dark Tender. After the Cures free her using Innocent Purification, she leaves to America to visit her parents and aid the Cures. She later returns to Pikarigaoka to defend it from Red's Saiarks with the other Cures, while the Happiness Charge Cures travel to the Red Planet to fight Red.
Bomber Girls Pretty Cure (ボンバーガールズプリキュア, Bonbā Gāruzu Purikyua)
Voiced by: Miyuki Kobori, Mariko Kouda, Akemi Okamura
America's Pretty Cure team, which consists of three Cures. The pink Cure has blonde hair worn in a curly ponytail and wears a cowboy hat. The blue Cure has red hair worn in curly pigtails with a star hair accessory. The yellow Cure has silver hair worn with a brown headband and a feather hair accessory. Their theme is the Wild West, and their group attack is Star Boomerang (スターブーメラン, Sutā Būmeran).
Wonderful Net Pretty Cure (ワンダフルネットプリキュア, Wandafuru Netto Purikyua)
Voiced by: Miki Hase
India's Pretty Cure team, consisting of two Cures. The orange Cure has short orange hair and wears a green jewel head accessory and a yellow head scarf. The green Cure has long green hair and wears a white head scarf as well as an orange jewel and a golden oval on her forehead and in her hair. They both wear glasses. Their theme is technology, and their group attack is Optical Wave (オプティカルウェーブ, Oputikaru U~ēbu)
Cure Earl (キュアアール, Kyua Āru)
Voiced by: Asami Yano
The sole member of France's Pretty Cure team, Merci Pretty Cure (メルシィプリキュア, Merushi Purikyua). She has long blonde hair worn in worm tails and wears a pink hair accessory. Her weapon is a giant paintbrush with a red ribbon. Her theme is art, and her solo attack is Pinceau Arc-en-ciel (パッソーアルカンシエル, Passō Aruk An Shieru)
Cure Nile (キュアナイル, Kyua Nairu)
Voiced by: Miyuki Kobori

Africa's only known Cure, who is from Egypt. She has blue hair worn in a ponytail and wears a crown with a blue gem and a yellow transparent cloth. She wears a black vest with a blue collar with a white design and long puffy white sleeves, as well as a white skirt with golden lining and a yellow cloth. She also wears transparent loose yellow leggings and yellow sandals. Her attack is Nile Stream (ナイルストリーム, Nairu Sutorīmu)

Alo~ha Pretty Cure (アロ～ハプリキュア, Arōha Purikyua)
Hawaii's Pretty Cure team, consisting of twin sisters Ohana and Olina, Cure Sunset and Cure Wave respectively. Together, they introduce themselves as "The two lights sparkling in the southern lands! Alo~ha Pretty Cure!" (南国にかがやく2つの光! アロ～ハプリキュア!, Nangoku ni kagayaku futatsu no hikari! Aro~ha Purikyua!). Their duo attack is Hawaiian Lino Ahua (ハワイアン リノアフア, Hawaian Rino Afua).

Ohana (オハナ) / Cure Sunset (キュアサンセット, Kyua Sansetto)
Voiced by: Hitomi Yoshida
The elder twin of the Alo~ha Pretty Cure, who wields the power of the sun. As Cure Sunset, she introduces herself as "The red setting sun is a vow for tomorrow, Cure Sunset!" (赤い夕日は明日への誓い、キュアサンセット!, Akai yūhi wa asu e no chikai, Kyua Sansetto!).
Olina (オリナ, Orina) / Cure Wave (キュアウェーブ, Kyua Wēbu)
Voiced by: Sayaka Nakaya
The younger twin of the Alo~ha Pretty Cure, who wields the power of waves. As Cure Wave, she introduces herself as "The eternal melody of the rhythmic splashes, Cure Wave!" (よせては返す悠久の調べ、キュアウェーブ!, Yosete wa kaesu yūkyū no shirabe, Kyua Wēbu!).
Aloalo (アロアロ, Aroaro)
Voiced by: Seria Fukagawa
Ohana and Olina's fairy partner.

==== Other International Cures ====
Most information about them is unknown besides their appearance and current location.

England's only known Cure is Cure Continental (キュアコンチネンタル, Kyua Konchinentaru). She has bright yellow hair worn with a blue bow and blue eyes, and wears white spade-shaped earrings and a blue and white outfit that resembles the Alice in Wonderland dress.

Russia's only known Cure is Cure Katyusha (キュアカチューシャ, Kyua Kachūsha), who is shown to be among Phantom's victims. Her Cure name, Katyusha, is a shortened form of the Russian name Ekaterina.

Australia's only known Cure is Cure Southern Cross (キュアサザンクロス, Kyua Sazankurosu). Her Cure name is likely derived from the Southern Cross, which is featured on Australia's flag.

Italy has two Cures - Cure Gonna (キュアゴーンナ, Kyua Gōn'na) and Cure Pantaloni (キュアパンタローニ, Kyua Pantarōni), which mean Skirt and Trousers in Italian, respectively. They are identical twins who have blonde-orange hair worn in a ponytail and orange eyes.

=== Movie Characters ===
Tsumugi Orihara (織原つむぎ, Orihara Tsumugi)
Voiced by: Yui Horie
A girl who wants to become a ballerina dancer, but lost use of her legs because of Black Fang, who told her that she could stay in the Doll Kingdom and be able to dance if she defeated the Pretty Cure. In reality, he planned to absorb her despair to fuel his power.
Prince Zeke (ジーク王子, Jiiku Ouji)
Voiced by: Daisuke Ono
A prince from the Doll Kingdom who has feelings for Tsumugi and is one of her dolls brought to life.
Black Fang (ブラックファング, Burakku Fangu)
Voiced by: Toshiyuki Morikawa
The main antagonist of the film and a commander of the Phantom Empire, who created the Doll Kingdom to deceive Tsumugi into staying there and use her despair to fuel his power and conquer Earth. He is defeated by Cure Lovely in her Super Happiness Lovely form.
Funassyi (ふなっしー, Funasshī)
Voiced by: Himself
A yellow mascot from Funabashi, Chiba Prefecture.

== Production ==
The series was first filed by Toei in the Japan Patent Office for a variety of goods on October 2, 2013, and made public on October 24, 2013. In an issue of Nikkan Sports' PreCure Shimbun newspaper, Dokidoki! PreCure's producer, Hiroaki Shibata, confirmed the series and series writer Ryota Yamaguchi confirmed Dokidoki! PreCure's 49 episode run and that HappinessCharge Precure! would debut in the beginning of February 2014. The project was then officially revealed in the January 2014 issue of Shogakukan's CoroCoro Comic Magazine. The anime's form changing is also used in the ending and would make use of advanced 3D/CGI graphics and motion capture, which was used in the previous series' dancing ending themes.

On January 3, 2014, Megumi Nakajima of Macross Frontier fame announced that she will voice the series' main character, Megumi Aino. She stated that Pretty Cure was something she had adored for a long time, so it was like a dream to be allowed to star in it herself. It is the first time she took another lead anime role after previously announcing an indefinite hiatus from her music career at the end of March 2014. A day later, the first commercial for the series was aired at the end of episode 46 of DokiDoki PreCure!, showcasing Cure Lovely and Cure Princess' transformations. On January 26, the trailer for the first episode was aired at the end of the final episode of DokiDoki PreCure!

== Media ==
=== Anime ===
The series began airing on ABC and other ANN stations from February 2, 2014, replacing DokiDoki! Precure in its initial timeslot with the Broadcasting System of San-in broadcasting on February 8, 2014. The first 34 episodes feature a special 10th anniversary message presented by one of the previous Pretty Cures in the franchise including the HappinessCharge Cures themselves. DVDs and Blu-rays of the series were released in volumes.

==== Films ====
The main characters of the series also appeared in the film Pretty Cure All Stars New Stage 3: Eternal Friends on March 15, 2014. The movie's single and soundtrack was released three days prior to the movie's premiere.

A spinoff movie of the series has also been revealed, titled HappinessCharge PreCure! the Movie: The Ballerina of the Land of Dolls (映画ハピネスチャージプリキュア！人形の国のバレリーナ, Eiga HapinesuChāji PuriKyua! Ningyō no kuni no barerīna) was released on October 11, 2014. The single and soundtrack for the movie was released on October 8, 2014, along with the anime's second ending theme single.

==== Music ====
The series uses three pieces of theme music, one opening theme and two ending themes. The opening theme is "HappinessCharge PreCure! WOW!" (ハピネスチャージプリキュア!WOW!, Hapinesu Chāji Purikyua! WOW!) by former AKB48 member Sayaka Nakaya. The ending theme for the first 26 episodes is "PreCure Memory" (プリキュア・メモリ, Purikyua Memori) by Hitomi Yoshida, whilst the theme for episode 27-49 is "Party Has Come" (パーティ ハズカム, Pāti Hazukamu) by Yoshida. The single containing both songs was released by Marvelous AQL (later, Marvelous Inc.) on March 5, 2014. All of the theme songs are composed by Yasuo Kosugi except for Party Has Come, which is by Hizashi, and the background music is by Hiroshi Takaki, who previously composed DokiDoki! Precure's background music. The first original soundtrack was released on May 21, 2014, with the title PreCure Sound Charge!! Also, the first vocal album was released on July 23, 2014, with the title Hello! Happiness Friends! featuring songs performed by the main characters of the anime along with the theme songs. On October 8, 2014, the single for the anime's second ending theme was released. The anime's second official soundtrack was released on November 5, 2014, with the title Precure Sound Big Bang!! Also, the second vocal album was released on November 19, 2014, with the title Shining ☆ Happiness Party. In addition, a vocal best album was released on January 14, 2015.

=== Manga ===
Like the series before it, a manga adaptation by Futago Kamikita began serialization in Kodansha's Nakayoshi magazine in March 2014.

=== Video games ===
The Pretty Cures debuted in HappinessCharge PreCure! were added in the new update of the Pretty Cure All Stars Data Carddass arcade game in February 2014. This update included compatibility with the collectible PreCards. A video game based on the series, titled HappinessCharge Precure! Kawarun Collection (ハピネスチャージプリキュア! カワルン☆コレクション), developed by Bandai Namco Games, was released on the Nintendo 3DS on July 31, 2014. The game features all the Pretty Cures from previous series, with early editions including a download code to unlock all the Cures from the start and three exclusive PreCards.

=== Merchandise ===
Throughout the anime's run, merchandise was released, including watches, weapons, transformation items, cards, bags, and more. Most of this merchandise was distributed by Bandai, the main sponsor of the series. Special PreCards were also released during the anime's run, beginning with promotional cards included in McDonald's Happy Meals in January 2014.

Preceded by DokiDoki! PreCure	HappinessCharge Pretty Cure! 2014-2015	Succeeded by Go! Princess PreCure
