= Melty Blood: Type Lumina =

Fighting game

- Developer: French-Bread (Note: Additional work by Tamsoft and GameLoop Inc.)
- Publishers: Delightworks (2021-2022); Lasengle (2022-present); Aniplex (Twi-Lumina)
- Director: Kamone Serizawa
- Producer: Nobuhisa Hiroshige
- Designer: Kamone Serizawa
- Artist: Takashi Takeuchi
- Writer: Kinoko Nasu
- Composer: Raito
- Series: Melty Blood
- Platforms: Nintendo Switch; PlayStation 4; Xbox One; Windows; Nintendo Switch 2; PlayStation 5
- Release: Type: Lumina; September 30, 2021; Twi-Lumina; April 22, 2027
- Genres: Fighting, visual novel
- Modes: Single-player, multiplayer

Melty Blood: Type Lumina (Note: Japanese: メルティブラッド：タイプルミナ) is a 2021 2D fighting game developed by French-Bread with assistance from Tamsoft and GameLoop, and published by Delightworks and Lasengle for Nintendo Switch, PlayStation 4, Windows, and Xbox One. It is a reboot of Melty Blood, a series of fighting games based on the visual novel Tsukihime by Type Moon. Unlike the earlier entries, Type Lumina takes place in the continuity of its 2022 remake, Tsukihime -A piece of blue glass moon-.

A sequel titled Melty Blood: Twi-Lumina, (Note: Japanese: メルティブラッド：トワイルミナ) was announced at Evo Japan 2026. It is set to be released by Aniplex in April 22, 2027 for the same platforms in addition to Nintendo Switch 2 and PlayStation 5.

== Gameplay ==
Gameplay screenshot

Most of the gameplay systems were carried over from the previous Melty Blood games, except Guard Meter and Moon Styles.

These new mechanics are:

- Rapid Beat: Auto-combo sequences that are executed by repeated presses of an attack button. However, once the same button is pressed while using this mechanic, the third chain combo will immediately end with a Launcher while on the ground and an air throw in the air. Reverse Beats cannot be performed during a Rapid Beat.

In August 2022, the second string of Rapid Beat was changed to work by pressing the A and B buttons simultaneously. The option to turn it off for air attacks (or even entirely) was also added. However, the original Rapid Beat function is still required in Mission mode.

- New Moon System. Instead of Moon Styles that act as variations of a single character, a Moon Icon is now present. This gauge is used for the following techniques:
  - Moon Skills: Very powerful special moves that can be unleashed by consuming the Moon Icons that appear next to the life gauge. These deal greater damage than regular special moves, and are not only more powerful, but easy to activate with simple controls using combinations of the directional and attack buttons.
  - Moon Drive: A Chain Shift/Overdrive-based power-up that can be activated by using all of Moon Icons any time with more than one-half full. It temporarily boosts Moon Skill, increases Magic Circuit or the number of possible Jumps/Dashes, and provides various other effects.

Additionally, the Last Arc move mechanic has been updated and received an alternative method of activating it. Instead of strictly requiring a successful EX Shield during Blood Heat, Last Arc moves can now be done as an independent move, similar to Infinite Worth EXS mechanic from Under Night In-Birth. However, this can only be done once after losing a previous round and uses four bars of Magic Circuit meter, with one bar permanently removed if the Last Arc lands.

The game supports rollback netcode, but does not feature cross-play between different platforms.

== Plot ==
The game is set in 2014, in the new continuity first established by Tsukihime -A piece of blue glass moon-, ten days before the events of the visual novel, unlike the earlier entries in the Melty Blood series set in 2001, a year after a hypothetical Satsuki Yumizuka route of original Tsukihime and a month after Kagetsu Tohya. Although some of the characters’ storylines alternatively take place during Tsukihime remake games -A piece of blue glass moon- and the upcoming -The other side of red garden-.

Unlike the first game in the series, Type Lumina does not have an overarching story with a single point of view. Instead, each character has their own Story Mode that consists of multiple stages, with select encounters accompanied by conversations presented in a visual novel style, and an ending sequence. A Boss Rush story featuring Miyako, unlocks after completing all individual scenarios.

Additional scenarios for Arcueid and Ciel, written by acpi based on the draft by Nasu, and a second Boss Rush story focusing on Noel, were added after release. The cutscenes were also updated, displaying dynamic character sprites in addition to their portraits, bringing the presentation closer to Arcade Mode of past Melty Blood games.

It also features a crossover storyline between Tsukihime and Fate universes, which ends in the third and fourth Boss Rush chapters, with Neco-Arc as a boss character. In the latter, a silhouette of Kagetsu Tohya’s main heroine Len appears after the credits. She would later appear as a central character in Twi-Lumina.

== Characters ==
The game features fourteen fighters in its initial roster. Eight characters were added later as free downloadable content, bringing the total to twenty two.

Twi-Lumina will add other characters, with two already confirmed.

Launch roster

- Shiki Tohno (Voiced by: Ryōsuke Kanemoto)
- Arcueid Brunestud (Voiced by: Ikumi Hasegawa)
- Red Arcueid (Voiced by: Ikumi Hasegawa)
- Ciel (Voiced by: Kaede Hondo)
- Akiha Tohno (Voiced by: Shino Shimoji)
- Hisui (Voiced by: Kana Ichinose)
- Kohaku (Voiced by: Yūki Kuwahara)
- Hisui & Kohaku (Voiced by: Kana Ichinose and Yūki Kuwahara)
- Noel ^{a} (Voiced by: Ai Kayano)
- Vlov Arkhangel ^{a} (Voiced by: Kenjiro Tsuda)
- Michael Roa Valdamjong (Voiced by: Yohei Azakami)
- Kouma Kishima (Voiced by: Daiki Hamano)
- Miyako Arima (Voiced by: Hisako Kanemoto)
- Saber ^{a}^{b} (Voiced by: Ayako Kawasumi)

Downloadable content

- Dead Apostle Noel ^{a} (Voiced by: Ai Kayano)
- Aoko Aozaki (Voiced by: Haruka Tomatsu)
- Powered Ciel (Voiced by: Kaede Hondo)
- Mario Gallo Bestino ^{a} (Voiced by: Ayane Sakura)
- Neco-Arc (Voiced by: Ikumi Hasegawa (Note: Select colors feature unique voices: Kaede Hondo (Neco-Ciel), Yūki Kuwahara (Neco-Kohaku), Kana Ichinose (Neco-Hisui), Shino Shimoji (Neco-Akiha)))
- Mash Kyrielight ^{a}^{b} (Voiced by: Rie Takahashi)
- Ushiwakamaru ^{a}^{b} (Voiced by: Saori Hayami)
- The Count of Monte Cristo ^{a}^{b} (Voiced by: Nobunaga Shimazaki)

Twi-Lumina exclusive

- Len (Voiced by: Kaori Ishihara)
- White Len (Voiced by: Kaori Ishihara)

^a New character.
^b Guest character from the Fate series.

== Development ==
In 2010, Melty Blood: Type Lumina was originally planned as a yet-to-be-titled remake of Melty Blood. However, development stalled when Type-Moon began working on the visual novel Witch on the Holy Night. This led to French-Bread starting Under Night In-Birth in 2011, where the main character of Melty Blood, Sion Eltnam Atlasia, became a guest character.

A decade later, Type-Moon and French-Bread collaborated once again to continue the development of "Melty Blood HD" and reboot the series with Type Lumina, a fighting game set in the same setting as the 2021 remake of Tsukihime. As the remake made changes to the original story, setting, and characters, some fighters who last appeared in previous Melty Blood games, most notably Sion, have not made a return. The reduced roster has allowed the developers to include more voiced lines and unique interactions between different combatants, with Arc System Works and Cygames-developed game Granblue Fantasy Versus cited as the main inspiration. Built from the ground up, the game supports high definition 2D visuals and features an updated fighting system.

On March 25, 2021, Melty Blood: Type Lumina, developed by French-Bread and produced by Project Lumina, an entity consisting of Type-Moon, Aniplex, and Delightworks, was announced for a 2021 worldwide release for the Nintendo Switch, PlayStation 4, and Xbox One consoles. On June 23, 2021, it was announced through the Type-Moon Vol. 3 broadcast that a Microsoft Windows version will be released via Steam alongside consoles, as well as the game's September 30 release date, and standard and deluxe editions. Originally during Type Moon Vol. 5, released on August 24, 2021, it was said that the game's initial playable roster will be 13. However, in Type Moon Vol. 6, released on September 29, 2021, one more initial character was revealed, Altria Pendragon (in her original Saber-class variant), a guest character from Type-Moon's Fate series.

Raito, the composer for the previous Melty Blood games, has returned to create the music for Type Lumina. The opening theme Stack Black performed by Hiyori Miyamoto, was written, composed, and arranged by Kegani from Live Lab, who also wrote the opening themes of Tsukihime -A piece of blue glass moon-. The ending themes, Blue-Teared Moon and Bloodlust Lullaby, were both composed by Raito with lyrics of RyoRca. Blue-Teared Moon was performed by Reina Nagao and Bloodlust Lullaby was performed by Raito.

=== Post-launch support ===
On October 30, 2021, a month after the game's release, it was announced that DLC characters and their associated stages are in the works, and being made available for free, except for their voice announcers. Initially, new characters had to be downloaded at the online storefronts. However, as of August 2022, all DLC characters are immediately available as part of the latest update patch.

The first DLC character, a Dead Apostle-type vampire version of Noel, was revealed on December 22, 2021. During Fate Project New Year's Eve TV Special in the end of 2021, Aoko Aozaki was announced to return as a second DLC character to promote upcoming movie adaption and home console ports of Tsukihime prequel title, Witch on the Holy Night. Both characters were released on January 13, 2022.

The next pair of DLC characters was announced after the first official tournament on April 10, 2022, held by Type-Moon and French Bread. A powered-up form of Ciel (who is also part of regular Ciel’s Arc moves), and a new character exclusive to the remake, Mario Gallo Bestino, were released on April 14, 2022. Every character also received five additional color palettes.

After the second official tournament on June 26, 2022, held by Type-Moon and French Bread, further updates to the game were announced, including four more characters to be released in pairs in Q2 2022 and Q4 2022 respectively.

On July 31, 2022, it was announced that Neco-Arc, a series mainstay who was non-playable in the initial release of the game, will return as a playable fighter, accompanied by another Fate guest character, Mash Kyrielight, in exchange for the inclusion of Arcueid's Archetype=Earth variant in the Fate mobile RPG gacha game Fate/Grand Order. Both characters were released on August 19, 2022 as part of a major update that brought many gameplay and balance changes to the game. Additionally, the Story Mode was updated with new scenarios, and "enhanced direction" in the cutscenes.

During the third official tournament it was announced that two "unusual" characters will be added to the game in Q4 2022. Meanwhile, an anniversary update on September 30, 2022 added update color customization systems, stage select menus, and ten remastered music tracks from Melty Blood Actress Again. In addition, cosmetic items based on Type Lumina were included in Phantasy Star Online 2: New Genesis.

On December 11, 2022, the "unusual" characters were revealed to be other Fate/Grand Order servants, the Rider-class Ushiwakamaru and the Avenger-class Edmond Dantès (named The Count of Monte Cristo). Both were released on December 15, 2022 alongside their stages, ten more remastered Actress Again tracks, and the third and fourth "Boss Rush" scenarios. As part of the ongoing collaboration between this game and Grand Order, the latter game will feature card abilities based on the former.

Despite the Delightworks video game branch's acquisition to Aniplex under the banner "Lasengle", it does not affect the DLC productions of Type Lumina.

== Reception ==
The game received overwhelming positive reviews. The Japanese magazine Gamer found that the game was accessible thanks to its combo mechanics and the introduction of Rapid Beat system, and recommended it to players who wish to further enjoy the story of Tsukihime -A piece of blue glass moon-, even if they do not play fighting games. The reviewer was surprised that even after the visual evolution with larger sprites, it still retained the basic feel of past titles. Gamer ended their review by saying that the new systems and innovations have created a completely new experience for the new Melty Blood era.

In the West, the game did not receive enough reviews to score at review aggregator Metacritic. Inverse criticized the game's netcode, deeming its implementation of rollback inferior to Guilty Gear Strive. Besides some other perceived issues, such as the low Shield being too powerful, the reviewer thoroughly enjoyed the game, and said it highlights many of the genre’s strong points, while also being a good entry point. The deep movement options on offer were given special praise, naming the end result a "unique flavor that feels like a mix of Under Night In-Birth, classic Melty Blood, Dengeki Bunko: Fighting Climax, and Dragon Ball FighterZ. Inverse ended their review by calling Type Lumina "one the best new fighting games in years", awarding it a score of 9/10.

For the first time since the inclusion of Melty Blood Actress Again in the main event of EVO 2010, Type Lumina was included in the main event of EVO 2022. It was also announced to be part of the main lineup for EVO Japan 2023.

At the 25th Annual D.I.C.E. Awards, the Academy of Interactive Arts & Sciences nominated Melty Blood for Fighting Game of the Year.

=== Sales ===
Melty Blood: Type Lumina sold 11,604 units on the Nintendo Switch and 18,833 units on the PlayStation 4, for a total of 30,437 retail copies sold in Japan. This does not include download sales.

On March 14, 2022, the game's sales surpassed 270,000 units worldwide. On September 24, 2022, it was announced that the game's worldwide sales surpassed 330,000 units.

As part of the 5th anniversary of Type-Lumina, an update Melty Blood: Twi-Lumina was announced at EVO Japan 2026 at May 2026.
