= Rina Kitagawa =

Japanese voice actress (born 1993)

- 北川 里奈
- Born: July 6, 1993 (age 33); Yokohama, Kanagawa Prefecture, Japan
- Other name: Kitarina
- Occupation: Voice actress
- Years active: 2013–present
- Agent: Ken-On
- Height: 158 cm (5 ft 2 in)
- Website: www.ken-on.co.jp/kitagawa/

Rina Kitagawa (北川 里奈, Kitagawa Rina; born July 6, 1993) is a Japanese voice actress. She is affiliated with Ken-On.

== Biography ==
Kitagawa made her debut anime role for Gatchaman Crowds.

== Filmography ==
=== Anime series ===
- Blood Blockade Battlefront – Angelica
- Brotherhood: Final Fantasy XV – Lunafreya Nox Fleuret
- Cannon Busters - 12welve
- Case Closed – Koyuki Ujisato
- Chieri to Cherry – Shouta
- Dragon Ball Super – Brianne de Chateau, Ribrianne
- HappinessCharge Precure – Yuko Omori/Cure Honey
- Keijo – Saya Kogatana
- My Love Story!! – Nanako Yamazaki, Mio
- Orange – Female student, Male student, Marie
- Precure All Stars Movie: Haru no Carnival♪ – Yuko Omori/Cure Honey
- Tamayomi – Ryō Kawasaki

=== Anime films ===
- HappinessCharge PreCure! the Movie: The Ballerina of the Land of Dolls – Yuko Omori/Cure Honey
- A Whisker Away – Yumi Hinode

=== Video games ===
- Sengoku X
- Final Fantasy XV – Lunafreya Nox Fleuret, Mysterious Voice (DLC)
- Yokai Hyakkitan – Fenghuang, Sansei
- Bara ni Kakusareshi Verite – Marie Antoinette
- Medarot Girls Mission – Kokushou Sayuri
- Food Fantasy (2018) – Sushi, Tiramisu, Milk
- Disgaea 7 – Seefour

=== Dubbing ===
- All of Us Are Dead, Jang Ha-ri (Ha Seung-ri)
- All We Had, Ruthie Carmichael (Stefania LaVie Owen)
- The Mule, Ginny (Taissa Farmiga)
- Shane (New Era Movies edition), Marian Starrett (Jean Arthur)
