= Koisuru One Piece =

Japanese manga series by Daiki Ihara

- First tankōbon volume cover

恋するワンピース (Koisuru Wan Pīsu)
- Genre: Comedy
- Created by: Eiichiro Oda
- Manga
- Written by: Daiki Ihara
- Published by: Shueisha
- Imprint: Jump Comics+
- Magazine: Shōnen Jump+
- Original run: June 18, 2018 – January 22, 2026
- Volumes: 12
- Original net animation
- Directed by: Yū Kamatani; Hazuki Omoya
- Studio: Toei Animation
- Released: April 1, 2025 – April 5, 2025
- Runtime: 6-7 minutes
- Episodes: 5
- icon

Koisuru One Piece (Japanese: 恋するワンピース, Hepburn: Koisuru Wan Pīsu; lit. 'One Piece in Love') is a Japanese manga series written and illustrated by Daiki Ihara. It was serialized on Shueisha's Shōnen Jump+ manga service from June 2018 to January 2026. It is a spin-off of Eiichiro Oda's One Piece manga series. An original net animation adaptation was released in April 2025.

== Premise ==
A group of high school students with the same names as the Straw Hat Pirates end up forming a One Piece fan club. Throughout the series, parodying moments from the One Piece manga.

== Characters ==
Luffy Yamamoto (山本 海賊王(ルフィ), Yamamoto Rufi)
Voiced by: Ryōsuke Kanemoto
Nami Koyama (小山 菜美, Koyama Nami)
Voiced by: Ayane Sakura
Usopp Nakatsugawa (中津川 嘘風(ウソップ), Nakatsugawa Usoppu)
Voiced by: Yuichi Nakamura
Sato Yoshioka (吉岡咲灯, Yoshioka Satō)
Voiced by: Akari Kitō
Biology Club President (生物部部長, Seibutsu-bu Buchō)
Voiced by: Akira Ishida
Tsuchi (つっち)
Voiced by: Megumi Han
Toriko Kurono (黒野虜, Kurono Toriko)
Voiced by: Takehito Koyasu
Narrator (ナレーション, Narēshon)
Voiced by: Mahito Ōba

== Media ==
=== Manga ===
Written and illustrated by Daiki Ihara, Koisuru One Piece began serialization on Shueisha's Shōnen Jump+ manga service on June 18, 2018. The series went on hiatus on November 7, 2021, due to Ihara launching Protect Me, Shugomaru! in Weekly Shōnen Jump later in the year. It resumed serialization on April 10, 2025, and ended on January 22, 2026. Its chapters have been compiled into twelve tankōbon volumes as of January 2026.

No.	Release date	ISBN
1	December 4, 2018	978-4-08-881680-7
2	July 4, 2019	978-4-08-881884-9
3	October 4, 2019	978-4-08-882130-6
4	December 28, 2019	978-4-08-882199-3
5	September 4, 2020	978-4-08-882371-3
6	November 4, 2020	978-4-08-882476-5
7	June 4, 2021	978-4-08-882689-9
8	September 3, 2021	978-4-08-882767-4
9	April 4, 2022	978-4-08-883080-3
10	September 4, 2025	978-4-08-884687-3
11	November 4, 2025	978-4-08-884755-9
12	January 5, 2026	978-4-08-884860-0
13	March 4, 2026	978-4-08-884887-7

=== Anime ===
An original net animation adaptation was announced during an AnimeJapan event on March 22, 2025. The series consisted of five anime shorts that aired on YouTube, Instagram and TikTok from April 1 to 5, 2025.

== See also ==
- Protect Me, Shugomaru!, another manga series by the same author
