= Protect Me, Shugomaru! =

Japanese manga series by Daiki Ihara

- First tankōbon volume cover

守れ!しゅごまる (Mamore! Shugomaru)
- Genre: Comedy
- Manga
- Written by: Daiki Ihara
- Published by: Shueisha
- English publisher: NA: Viz Media
- Imprint: Jump Comics
- Magazine: Weekly Shōnen Jump
- Original run: November 22, 2021 – June 6, 2022
- Volumes: 3
- icon

Protect Me, Shugomaru! (Japanese: 守れ!しゅごまる, Hepburn: Mamore! Shugomaru) is a Japanese manga series written and illustrated by Daiki Ihara. It was serialized in Shueisha's shōnen manga magazine Weekly Shōnen Jump from November 2021 to June 2022. As of August 2022, its chapters have been collected into three tankōbon volumes.

== Publication ==
Written and illustrated by Daiki Ihara, Protect Me, Shugomaru! was serialized in Shueisha's shōnen manga magazine Weekly Shōnen Jump from November 22, 2021, to June 6, 2022. The series was collected into three tankōbon volumes, releasing on April 4, June 3, and August 4 2022, respectively.

Viz Media and Manga Plus published its chapters in English simultaneously with the Japanese release.

=== Volumes ===
No.	Original release date	Original ISBN	English release date	English ISBN
1	April 4, 2022	978-4-08-883074-2	December 26, 2023	978-1-9747-3607-2
01. "Protect Sanagi, Shugomaru!"; 02. "Protect Me While Weeding, Shugomaru!"; 03. "Protect Me From Hebihara, Shugomaru!"; 04. "Protect Me at the Station, Shugomaru!"; 05. "Protect Me During Clubs, Shugomaru!"; 06. "Protect Me During Track and Field, Shugomaru!"; 07. "Protect Me at Cooking Club, Shugomaru!"; 08. Protect Me From Oikaze, Shugomaru!"; Side Story: "Rendezvous"; Side Story: "Kotatsu"; Special Bonus Chapter: "Shugomaru Security Software"
2	June 3, 2022	978-4-08-883144-2	December 26, 2023	978-1-9747-4031-4
09. "Can You Even Protect Me, Shugomaru?!"; 10. "Protect Me From Fujii, Shugomaru!"; 11. "Protect Me Alongside the Malevolent God, Shugomaru!"; 12. "Protect Me From Aoi, Shugomaru!"; 13. "Expose the Boss's Identity, Shugomaru!"; 14. "Fight Your Big Brother, Shugomaru!"; 15. "Show Them That Shachihoko, Shugomaru!"; 16. "Protect Me Like Usual, Shugomaru!"; 17. "Student Council President Shugomaru?!"; Special Bonus Chapter: "Oden Cart"
3	August 4, 2022	978-4-08-883145-9	December 26, 2023	978-1-9747-4032-1
18. "Protect Me with Your Classmates, Shugomaru!"; 19. "Protect Me at the Mall, Shugomaru!"; 20. "Think of a Gift, Shugomaru!"; 21. "Protect Me in the Snow, Shugomaru!"; 22. "What's Gonna Happen, Shugomaru?!"; 23. "It's Time to Duel, Shugomaru!"; 24. "Learn the Truth, Sanagi!"; 25. "What's Your Move, Sanagi?"; 26. "Kofuku's Future"; Special Bonus Chapter: "Epilogue"

== Reception ==
Steven Blackburn from Screen Rant criticized the series, stating the series is unoriginal and had little long-term sustainability.

== See also ==
- Koisuru One Piece, another manga series by the same author
