= Ryōsuke Kanemoto =

Japanese voice actor

- 金本 涼輔
- Born: September 2, 1988 (age 38); Okayama Prefecture, Japan
- Education: Osaka University of Commerce
- Occupation: Voice actor
- Years active: 2011-present
- Agent: Aoni Production
- Height: 171 cm (5 ft 7 in)

Ryōsuke Kanemoto (金本 涼輔, Kanemoto Ryōsuke; born September 2, 1988) is a Japanese voice actor.

== Filmography ==
- Koisuru One Piece as Luffy Yamamoto (2025)
- MapleStory as Will

=== Dubbing ===
- Anne with an E as Gilbert Blythe (2020)
