= New Theatrical Movie Keroro Gunsō: Upon Revival, Immediately Facing the Threat of Earth's Destruction! =

2026 Japanese film by Fumitoshi Oizaki and Yūichi Fukuda

- Theatrical release poster
- 新劇場版ケロロ軍曹 復活して速攻地球滅亡の危機であります!
- Directed by: Fumitoshi Oizaki; Yūichi Fukuda (chief)
- Screenplay by: Yūichi Fukuda
- Based on: Sgt. Frog by Mine Yoshizaki
- Starring: Kumiko Watanabe; Houko Kuwashima; Chiwa Saitō; Etsuko Kozakura; Jōji Nakata; Takehito Koyasu; Takeshi Kusao; Jesse
- Narrated by: Shinobu Hasegawa
- Cinematography: Takeo Ogiwara
- Edited by: Akari Saitō
- Music by: Eishi Segawa
- Production company: BN Pictures
- Distributed by: Kadokawa; Bandai Namco Filmworks
- Release date: June 26, 2026 (Japan)
- Running time: 109 minutes
- Country: Japan
- Language: Japanese
- Box office: $931,400

New Theatrical Movie Keroro Gunsō: Upon Revival, Immediately Facing the Threat of Earth's Destruction! (Japanese: 新劇場版ケロロ軍曹 復活して速攻地球滅亡の危機であります!, Hepburn: Shin Gekijō-ban Keroro Gunsō Fukkatsu Shite Sokkō Chikyū Metsubō no Kiki de Arimasu!) is a 2026 Japanese animated comic science fiction film directed by Fumitoshi Oizaki and written and chief directed by Yūichi Fukuda. Based on the Sgt. Frog manga series by Mine Yoshizaki, the film is the sixth installment in the Sgt. Frog film series and celebrates the 20th anniversary of the Sgt. Frog television series. Produced by BN Pictures and distributed by Kadokawa and Bandai Namco Filmworks, the film was released in theatres on June 26, 2026 in Japan.

It is the first Sgt. Frog feature film in 16 years since Keroro Gunso the Super Movie: Creation! Ultimate Keroro, Wonder Space-Time Island in 2010.

== Synopsis ==
The Keroro Platoon, living their lazy days as if invasion were nothing. Then one day, they face a series of bizarre phenomena erupting across the nation. Feeling a sense of crisis, the Keroro Platoon rises up, staking their pride as invaders! What is the meaning of the mysterious symbols they encounter wherever they go. The largest-scale battle in the history of Sgt. Frog begins in the Reiwa era!

== Voice cast ==
Character	Voice actor
Sergeant Keroro	Kumiko Watanabe
Fuyuki Hinata	Houko Kuwashima
Private Second Class Tamama	Etsuko Kozakura
Corporal Giroro	Jōji Nakata
Sergeant Major Kululu	Takehito Koyasu
Lance Corporal Dororo	Takeshi Kusao
Natsumi Hinata	Chiwa Saitō
Aki Hinata	Akiko Hiramatsu
Momoka Nishizawa	Haruna Ikezawa
Angol Mois	Mamiko Noto
Koyuki Azumaya	Ryō Hirohashi
Saburo	Akira Ishida
Kogoro	Nobuyuki Hiyama
Lavie	Tomoko Kaneda
Aruru	Jesse
Deruru	Jesse
Researcher Robot	Ano
Murasaki	Haruka Kinami
Hotoke (Buddha)	Jiro Sato
Shibuya Man	Keigo Satō
Space Police Chief	Kōichi Yamadera
Alien	Natsuki Hanae
Shibuya Woman	Rina Watanabe
Danjō	Shin Takuma
Man in Shibuya	Soshina
Kumamoto Announcer	Suzanne
Yoshihiko	Takayuki Yamada
Warrior #7	Tomokazu Seki
Merebu	Tsuyoshi Muro
Shibuya Man	Yūsei Yagi
HK	Ryohei Suzuki
Gintoki Sakata	Shun Oguri
Shinpachi Shimura	Masaki Suda
Kagura	Kanna Hashimoto
Isao Kondō	Nakamura Kankurō VI
Toshiro Hijikata	Yuya Yagira
Sogo Okita	Ryo Yoshizawa
Narrator	Shinobu Hasegawa

As part of a collaboration project with Sunrise's Gundam series, the RX-78-2 Gundam and the MS-05 Zaku II Char Custom appear in the film.

== Production ==
To commemorate the 20th anniversary of the Sgt. Frog television anime series, Bandai Namco Pictures announced in April 2024 that production on a new Sgt. Frog anime project had started, with the anime's voice actors confirmed to reprise their roles.

In July 2025, a teaser trailer for the new Sgt. Frog anime project was released, revealing that the project was a feature film slated to release in the summer of 2026, with Fumitoshi Oizaki directing with Yūichi Fukuda as the film's screenwriter and chief director.

In December 2025, a second teaser trailer, a visual poster, and the film's official title of Shin Gekijōban Keroro Gunsō: Fukkatsu Shite Sokkō Chikyū Metsubō no Kiki de Arimasu! were unveiled, with further confirmation that many of the anime's voice actors would return to reprise their roles for the film. A new Sgt. Frog television anime titled Sgt. Frog☆ was announced days later, set to feature an entirely new voice cast, making the film the last Sgt. Frog media to feature the original anime voice actors.

In March 2026, it was announced at the AnimeJapan stage panel for Sgt. Frog that the film would release on June 26 of that year, with movie characters Aruru and Deruru unveiled for the first time.

In April 2026, a full trailer and theatrical poster for the film were released. More cast members were unveiled, with SixTONES member Jesse announced as the voice of Aruru and Deruru.

In May 2026, it was announced that Ano and Soshina, who performed the film's opening theme song "Mata Kaettekita Kero! to March", would feature as guest voice actors and that comedian Shinobu Hasegawa would serve as the film's narrator, replacing Keiji Fujiwara who died in 2020 and had served as the narrator for previous Sgt. Frog media starting with the original anime series. That same month Tomokazu Seki, Natsuki Hanae, Kōichi Yamadera, Keigo Satō, Yūsei Yagi, Suzanne, and Rina Watanabe were all announced as guest voice actors for the film.

The film's ending theme is titled "Kashippanashi Destiny", and is performed by Ano. It was released on a digital single in June 2026, with a collaboration music video releasing later that same month.

== Release ==
=== Theatrical ===
New Theatrical Movie Keroro Gunsō: Upon Revival, Immediately Facing the Threat of Earth's Destruction! was released in Japan on June 26, 2026.

== Reception ==
=== Box office reception ===
The film debuted at fourth place in the Japanese box office, earning US$931,400 on 350 screens during its opening three-day weekend.

=== Audience reception ===
The film has been met with poor reception from Sgt. Frog fans and audiences, with heavy criticism aimed at the film's "boring story," "cliché writing," "disappointing animation quality," "wasted or mishandled characters," and "derivative parodies" of Attack on Titan, Neon Genesis Evangelion, and Ultraman. The film's perceived misunderstanding and lack of respect for the Sgt. Frog franchise was the subject of heavy criticism online, with chief director and screenwriter Yūichi Fukuda receiving heavy backlash for his work on the film. It has also been seen as a poor send-off to the original Sgt. Frog anime voice actors.

It received very low review scores on Japanese movie review sites on its opening day, such as 1 out of 5 stars on Eiga and 2 out of 5 stars on Filmarks.

== Controversy ==
Bandai Namco Filmworks and Bandai Namco Pictures issued an apology statement for "making unauthorized references to various intellectual properties" in the film, particularly Attack on Titan. "We deeply apologize to all rights holders involved and to all fans of these works for the immense trouble and concern we have caused. As companies that create and protect works, our failure to give sincere and sufficient consideration to the responsibilities incumbent upon us is a matter we take seriously", BNF and BNP stated. BNF also issued an apology to the film's production staff, Sgt. Frog creator Mine Yoshizaki, and the editors of Monthly Shōnen Ace. TV Tokyo also apologized on July 8th. Due to this, the stage greeting scheduled for July 2, 2026 at the Toho Cinemas Hibiya was cancelled due to "various circumstances".

Shun Oguri's comment, "I have no particular attachment to Sgt. Frog," also stirred controversy. While some interpreted it as humor characteristic of his Gintama character, Gintoki Sakata, others expressed sadness, calling the remark harsh.
