= Mamiko Noto =

Japanese voice actress (born 1980)

- 能登 麻美子
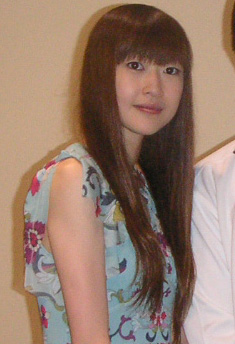
- Noto after her second panel at Otakon 2007
- Born: February 6, 1980 (age 46); Kanazawa, Ishikawa, Japan
- Occupations: Actress; voice actress; singer
- Years active: 1998–present
- Agent: Office Osawa
- Height: 162 cm (5 ft 4 in)
- Children: 1
- Musical career
- Genre: J-Pop
- Instrument: Vocals
- Years active: 2006–present
- Label: Lantis

Mamiko Noto (能登 麻美子, Noto Mamiko; born February 6, 1980) is a Japanese actress and singer. Some of her prominent anime roles include Kotomi Ichinose in Clannad, Rin in Inuyasha, Warrior Priestess Tomoe in Queen's Blade, Kotori Monou in X, Aoi Kannazuki in Kaitō Tenshi Twin Angel, Durandal in Honkai Impact 3rd, Ishmael in Punishing: Gray Raven, Haruka Nogizaka in Nogizaka Haruka no Himitsu, UMP9 in Girls' Frontline, Fiel Nirvalen in No Game No Life, Sawako Kuronuma in Kimi ni Todoke, and Satellizer L. Bridget in Freezing. Noto was nominated in the 1st Seiyu Awards for her work as Yakumo Tsukamoto in School Rumble and as Masane Amaha in Witchblade, and she was one of the recipients of the Best Supporting Actor Award at the 18th Seiyu Awards. Noto has released several character songs and albums which have charted in Oricon and was a guest at the Otakon and Anime Expo conventions held in the United States.

== Biography ==
Noto was born in Ishikawa Prefecture, Japan. After graduating from Baba Elementary School in Kanazawa City in 1992, she entered Kanazawa City Koshomachi Junior High School. In 1995, Noto entered Hokuriku Gakuin High School. After graduating from high school in 1998, Noto attended Yoyogi Animation Gakuin for a year, after which she became a trainee at the Osawa office. There, she was in charge of the script for episode 21 of the UHF anime, Tōka Gettan, first broadcast in April 2007.

Noto was introduced as a person from Ishikawa Prefecture in the morning edition of the Hokkoku Shimbun column "In the distance" on April 7, 2008.

Noto agreed to appear as a voice actress in the seventh volume of Haruka Nogizaka's Secret. The scene where she encounters Haruka at the CD release event is depicted with the impression that "the voice and characters are similar to Haruka." In volume nine, she reappears as "N's" and depicts the workplace and the scene of accepting autograph requests.

== Career ==
=== Voice acting ===
Noto's voice has been described as a "whisper voice" and a "healing voice".

Since the mid-2000s, Noto has been increasingly in charge of narration. Her voice is heard in promotional commercials such as for Mitsubishi Electric, Kewpie Corporation, and "Avocado.com". Aside from commercials, she is also in charge of the anime Inadvertently Penelope and the DVD The Scottish Fold Brothers: Atom & Luke.

Noto supervised the use of the Kanazawa dialect in Hanasaku Iroha, which is set in Noto's home of Ishikawa Prefecture. It has been noted that Noto requested her parents' cooperation, and in the staff roll of the seventh episode, "People of the Noto family" are credited as supervisors of the Kanazawa dialect.

In 2024, Noto was one of the recipients of the Best Supporting Actor Award at the 18th Seiyu Awards.

=== Music ===
Noto sang "Ashita no Te" (あしたの手) in the anime series Witchblade.

On November 23, 2011, Glory Heaven released Noto's debut single, "Ao no Kiseki". The OP / ED theme of the radio "Mamiko Noto / Earth NOTE", for which she is a personality, was recorded by her. Before that, she released the CD "Scoop! / 7 days after" in collaboration with Ayako Kawasumi, who often co-stars at the same office.

== Personal life ==
Noto announced her marriage on September 14, 2018. Noto announced the birth of her first child on February 1, 2019.

== Filmography ==
=== Anime ===
List of voice performances in anime
Year	Title	Role	Notes	Source
2000	Boogiepop Phantom	Moto Tonomura		
2001	Angelic Layer	Asuka Kitamura		
2001–22	Inuyasha series	Rin (supporting role); First year girl (episode 38)	Also The Final Act and Yashahime: Princess Half-Demon	
2001	PaRappa the Rapper	Ann	Episode 7	
2001	X	Kotori Monou		
2002	Naruto	Katsuyu		
2002	Full Metal Panic!	Shinji Kazama		
2002	Digimon Frontier	Floramon	Ep. 4	
2002	Kiddy Grade	Vendredi		
2002	Tenchi Muyo! GXP	Yoshiko Yamada		
2003	The World of Narue	Narue Nanase		
2003	Full Metal Panic? Fumoffu	Shinji Kazama		
2003	Godannar	Momoko "Momochie" Momozono		
2003	Shadow Star	Akira Sakura		
2003	Yami to Bōshi to Hon no Tabibito	Hazuki Azuma		
2003	Gunslinger Girl	Elsa de Sica		
2004	Mezzo DSA	Aiko Hasegawa	Ep. 2	
2004–09	Maria-sama ga Miteru	Shimako Tōdō	Also OVAs	
2004	Burn Up Scramble	Lilica Evette		
2004	Princess Tutu	Freya	Ep. 16	
2004	Paranoia Agent	Tsukiko Sagi		
2004	Hit o Nerae!	Mitsuki Ikuta		
2004	Sgt. Frog	Angol Mois		
2004	The Melody of Oblivion	The Melody of Oblivion		
2004–05	Monster	Nina Fortner, others		
2004–05	Girls Bravo	Yukinari Sasaki	Also Second Season	
2004	Elfen Lied	Yuka		
2004	My-HiME	Yukino Kikukawa		
2004	Onmyō Taisenki	Shōshi		
2004	Kannazuki no Miko	Reiko Ohta		
2004–06	School Rumble	Yakumo Tsukamoto	Also Second Semester and extras; nominated "Best Actress in a supporting role" 1st Seiyu Awards	
2004	Azusa Will Help!	Azusa	TV movie	
2005	Starship Operators	Sanri Wakana		
2005–06	Ah! My Goddess	Sayoko Mishima	Also Flights of Fancy	
2005	Mahou Sensei Negima	Nodoka Miyazaki	Also OVAs, specials	
2005	Canvas 2 ~Niji Iro no Sketch~	Yurina Kimikage	Ep. 8	
2005	The Law of Ueki	Rinko Jerrard		
2005	Strawberry 100%	Aya Tōjō	Also OVAs	
2005	Trinity Blood	Esther Blanchett		
2005	Yakitate!! Japan	Megumi Kimura	Ep. 34	
2005	Full Metal Panic!: The Second Raid	Shinji Kazama		
2005–07	Strawberry Marshmallow	Ana Coppola	Also OVAs	
2005–17	Hell Girl series	Ai Enma		
2005	My-Otome	Yukino Chrysant		
2005–12	Shakugan no Shana series	Hecate, Fumina Konoe		
2005	SoltyRei	Accela		
2006	High School Girls	Ayano Sato		
2006	Majokko Tsukune-chan	Mika Onigawara		
2006	Simoun	Rimone		
2006	Witchblade	Masane Amaha	Nominated "Best Actress in a leading role" 1st Seiyū Awards	
2006	xxxHolic	Girl	Ep. 7	
2006	Negima!?	Nodoka Miyazaki		
2006–14	Kenichi: The Mightiest Disciple	Shigure Kōsaka	Also OVAs	
2006	Ukkari Penelope	Narration		
2006–07	My-Otome Zwei	Yukino Chrysant		
2007	Naruto Shippuden	Katsuyu		
2007	Shinkyoku Sōkai Polyphonica	Mailreit		
2007	Bokurano	Komoda, Takami		
2007	Tōka Gettan	Hazuki Azuma	Also Scenario writer	
2007	Idolmaster: Xenoglossia	Naze Munakata		
2007–10	Bakugan Battle Brawlers	Alice	Also New Vestroia	
2007	Sola	Matsuri Shihō		
2007–09	AIKa R-16: Virgin Mission	Karen Minamino	Also Zero	
2007	Princess Resurrection	Reiri Kamura		
2007–12	The Familiar of Zero series	Tiffania Westwood		
2007	Clannad	Kotomi Ichinose		
2007	Kimikiss pure rouge	Mitsuki Shijō		
2008	Persona -trinity soul-	Ayane Komatsubara		
2008	Mnemosyne	Rin Asōgi		
2008	Allison & Lillia	Fiona		
2008–10	To Love Ru	Oshizu	Also Motto	
2008	Kanokon	Kōta Oyamada		
2008	Kaiba	Neiro		
2008–09	Nogizaka Haruka no Himitsu	Haruka Nogizaka	Also specials	
2008	Blade of the Immortal	Makie Otonotachibana		
2008	Kara no Kyōkai 3: Remaining Sense of Pain	Fujino Asagami		
2008	Clannad After Story	Kotomi Ichinose		
2008	Linebarrels of Iron	Emi Kizaki		
2008–11	A Certain Magical Index	Aisa Himegami	Also Index II, others	
2009	Akikan!	Yell		
2009	Sengoku Basara: Samurai Kings	Oichi	Also Sengoku Basara: End of Judgement	
2009–12	Queen's Blade series	Tomoe		
2009	Taishō Baseball Girls	Yuki Soya		
2009	Canaan	Hakko		
2009	Utsurun Desu.	Kappa		
2008–11	Kaitō Tenshi Twin Angel	Aoi Kannazuki	OVA and TV series	
2009	Student Council's Discretion	Lilicia Toudou		
2009–11	Kämpfer	Norainu Chissoku	Also für die Liebe	
2009–present	Kimi ni Todoke	Sawako Kuronuma	Also Second and Third Season	
2009	Aoi Bungaku		Ep. "Osamu Dazai's No Longer Human (Ningen Shikkaku)"	
2010	Gintama	Pandemonium	Ep. 197 and 249	
2010	B Gata H Kei	Kazuki Kosuda		
2010	Princess Jellyfish	Jiji		
2010	Honey Tokyo		Anime short by Tokyo Metropolitan Government	
2011–13	Freezing	Satellizer L. Bridget	Also Vibration	
2011	Hanasaku Iroha	Tomoe Wajima		
2011	Dororon Enma-kun Meramera	Yukiko-hime		
2011	Nura: Rise of the Yokai Clan: Demon Capital	Hagoromo Gitsune		
2011	Penguindrum	Yuri Tokikago		
2011–13	Ro-Kyu-Bu!	Nayu Hasegawa	Also SS	
2011	MonHun Nikki Girigiri Airū-mura G	Pugi		
2012–19	Fairy Tail	Mavis Vermillion		
2012	Lagrange: The Flower of Rin-ne	Yoko Nakaizumi		
2012	Gokujyo	Saya Abakane		
2012	Black Rock Shooter	Saya Irino		
2012–13	Hunter x Hunter	Kalluto Zoldyck		
2012–13	Shirokuma Cafe	Oosaki Ayumi (Ep. 8)		
2012–13	Saint Seiya Omega	Aria		
2012	Sket Dance	Koma Morishita		
2012–13	AKB0048	Haruna Kojima the 8th	Also Next Stage	
2012	La storia della Arcana Famiglia	Felicitá		
2012	Muv-Luv Alternative: Total Eclipse	Inia Sestina		
2012	Oda Nobuna no Yabō	Yoshimoto Imagawa		
2012	Zettai Junpaku: Mahō Shōjo	Kotone Sasaki	OVA	
2012–present	To Love Ru Darkness	Oshizu Murasame	Also 2nd	
2012	Gokicha!! Cockroach Girls	Gokicha		
2013	The Devil Is a Part-Timer!	Yuki Mizushima	Ep. 10	
2013	Hyakka Ryōran Samurai Bride	Keiji Maeda		
2013	Sunday Without God	Scar		
2013-17	The Eccentric Family	Benten		
2013	Genshiken Second Season	Kaminaga		
2013	Code Geass: Akito the Exiled	Maria Shing	Ep. 2	
2013	Coppelion	Ibuki Kajii		
2013	Unbreakable Machine-Doll	Lisette Norden/Eliza		
2014-15	Knights of Sidonia	Yure Shinatose		
2014	Pupa	Sachiko Hasegawa		
2014	No Game No Life	Fil Nilvalen		
2014	Nanana's Buried Treasure	Yukihime Fugi		
2014	Brynhildr in the Darkness	Mako Fujisaki		
2014	Akame ga Kill!	Sheele		
2014	Selector Spread WIXOSS	Iona Urazoe (Real)		
2014	Laughing Under the Clouds	Nishiki		
2015	Kantai Collection	Taihō		
2015	Maria the Virgin Witch	Viv		
2015	Food Wars: Shokugeki no Soma	Hinako Inui		
2015	Magical Girl Lyrical Nanoha ViVid	Einhart Stratos		
2015	Ninja Slayer From Animation	Electronic Maiko		
2015	Blood Blockade Battlefront	Gilica	Ep. 4	
2015	Gangsta	Alex Benedetto		
2016	Grimgar of Fantasy and Ash	Barbara		
2016	Fairy Tail Zero	Mavis Vermillion		
2016	Please Tell Me! Galko-chan	Narrator		
2016	Re:Zero	Elsa Granhiert		
2016	Rin-ne	Alligator Girl	Ep. 31	
2016	JoJo's Bizarre Adventure: Diamond Is Unbreakable	Yukako Yamagishi		
2016	Qualidea Code	Airi Yūnami		
2016	Classicaloid	Liszt		
2016	Occultic;Nine	Ririka Nishizono		
2017	Alice & Zōroku	Miriam C. Tachibana		
2017	Atom: The Beginning	Tsukie Saruta		
2017	Sakura Quest	Sayuri Shinomiya		
2017	Welcome to the Ballroom	Tamaki Tsuburaya		
2017	Elegant Yokai Apartment Life	Migiwa Hase		
2017	Armed Girl's Machiavellism	Yukino Fujibayashi	Also OVA	
2017	Altair: A Record of Battles	Caterina di Rossi		
2017	Land of the Lustrous	Euclase		
2017	Recovery of an MMO Junkie	Moriko Morioka		
2018	A Place Further than the Universe	Gin Tōdō		
2018	Golden Kamuy	Inkarmat	Ep.12	
2018	Cells at Work!	Narrator		
2018	Xuan Yuan Sword Luminary	Yun	Also narrator	
2018	Comic Girls	Haruko Moeta	Ep. 10 and 12	
2019	7 Seeds	Chisa Taiami		
2019	Bakugan: Battle Planet	Pyravian		
2019	The Ones Within	Yukako Niki		
2019	To the Abandoned Sacred Beasts	Elaine Bluelake		
2019	Demon Slayer: Kimetsu no Yaiba	Kotoha		
2020	Wave, Listen to Me!	Makie Tachibana		
2020	Bakugan: Armored Alliance	Pyravian		
2021	Attack on Titan: The Final Season	Lara Tybur/Warhammer Titan		
2021	World Trigger Season 3	Yuri Rindō		
2021	Kaginado	Kotomi Ichinose		
2022	The Genius Prince's Guide to Raising a Nation Out of Debt	Gardmeria		
2022	Chimimo	Mutsumi Onigami		
2022	Mobile Suit Gundam: The Witch from Mercury Prologue	Elnora Samaya		
2022	Mobile Suit Gundam: The Witch from Mercury	Prospera Mercury		
2022	Tekken: Bloodline	Jun Kazama		
2022	Bleach: Thousand Year Blood War	Kanae Katagiri		
2023	Kubo Won't Let Me Be Invisible	Yoshie Shiraishi		
2023	Hell's Paradise: Jigokuraku	Yui		
2023	Insomniacs After School	Usako Kurashiki		
2023	Heavenly Delusion	Asura		
2023	Otaku Elf	Haira		
2023	Ragna Crimson	Chimera		
2023	Shy	Spirit		
2023	Butareba: The Story of a Man Turned into a Pig	Brace		
2024	Ishura	Elea the Red Tag		
2024	The Apothecary Diaries	Empress Dowager		
2024	Grandpa and Grandma Turn Young Again	Ine		
2024	Chillin' in Another World with Level 2 Super Cheat Powers	Yorminyt		
2024	Suicide Squad Isekai	Aldora		
2024	No Longer Allowed in Another World	Esche		
2025	Sakamoto Days	Rion Akao		
2025	A Mangaka's Weirdly Wonderful Workplace	Ren Takizawa		
2025	Ninja vs. Gokudo	Maya Kohara		
2026	Kaya-chan Isn't Scary	Kaya-Mama (Mirai Satō)		
2026	The World Is Dancing	Nariko		

=== Film ===
List of voice performances in anime feature films
Year	Title	Role	Notes	Source
2000	Digimon: The Golden Digimentals	Kokomon		
2003	Tokyo Godfathers	Kiyoko		
2005	Rockman.EXE Hikari to Yami no Isan	Shūko Kido		
2006	Keroro Gunsō the Super Movie	Angol Mois		
2007	Chō Gekijōban Keroro Gunsō 2: Shinkai no Princess de Arimasu!	Angol Mois		
2008	Keroro Gunso the Super Movie 3: Keroro vs. Keroro Great Sky Duel	Angol Mois		
2009	Keroro Gunso the Super Movie 4: Gekishin Dragon Warriors	Angol Mois		
2009	Professor Layton and the Eternal Diva	Aroma		
2010	Keroro Gunso the Super Movie: Creation! Ultimate Keroro, Wonder Space-Time Island	Angol Mois		
2011	Drawer Hobs	Noeru	Short film, limited theatrical release (Note: Drawer Hobs was part of the Young Animators Fostering Project 2010, promoted by the Agency for Cultural Affairs of Japan)	
2012	Rainbow Fireflies	Saeko (adult)		
2013	Persona 3 The Movie: No. 1, Spring of Birth	Fuuka Yamagishi		
2014	Persona 3 The Movie: No. 2, Midsummer Knight's Dream	Fuuka Yamagishi		
2015	Doraemon: Nobita's Space Heroes	Burger Director		
2015	Girls und Panzer der Film	Mika		
2017	No Game No Life Zero	Fil Nilvalen		
2019	KonoSuba: God's Blessing on this Wonderful World! Legend of Crimson	Yuiyui		
2020	Crayon Shin-chan: Crash! Graffiti Kingdom and Almost Four Heroes	Yūma's mother		
2022	Re:cycle of Penguindrum	Yuri Tokikago		
2023	The Feast of Amrita	Aki		
2025	Tatsuki Fujimoto Before Chainsaw Man	Alien Bride	Compilation Film (Segment: Love is Blind)	
2026	Shin Gekijōban Keroro Gunsō: Fukkatsu Shite Sokkō Chikyū Metsubō no Kiki de Arimasu!	Angol Mois		

=== Video games ===
List of voice performances in video games
Year	Title	Role	Notes	Source
2002	Galaxy Angel series	Kuromie Quark		
2005	Lucky ☆ Star Moe Drill	Hinata Miyakawa		
2005	Mahou Sensei Negima! 1-Jikanme: Okochama Sensei wa Mahoutsukai!	Nodoka Miyazaki		
2006	Kimikiss	Mitsuki Shijō		
2006	Persona 3	Fuuka Yamagishi		
2006	Sengoku Basara 2	Oichi		
2007–18	Professor Layton series	Aroma		
2007	Lupin III: Lupin Ni Wa Shi o Zenigata Ni Wa Koi o	Ginrei		
2007	Shin Lucky ☆ Star Moe Drill: Tabidachi	Hinata Miyakawa		
2008	Rune Factory 2	Dorothy		
2008	Clannad Full Voice	Kotomi Ichinose	Original game was unvoiced	
2008	Mugen no Frontier: Super Robot Wars OG Saga	Suzuka-hime		
2008	Tales of Hearts	Paraiba Marine Dore		
2009	Shin Megami Tensei: Devil Survivor	Amane Kuzuryu		
2009	Sonic and the Black Knight	Merlina the Wizard		
2009	Dengeki Gakuen RPG: Cross of Venus	Haruka Nogizaka		
2010	.hack//Link	Klarinette		
2010	Sengoku Basara 3	Oichi		
2011	Tekken Tag Tournament 2	Jun Kazama		
2012	Zero Escape: Virtue's Last Reward	Luna		
2013	Kantai Collection	Taihō, Akitsumaru, Maruyu		
2013	God Eater 2	Ciel Alençon		
2013	Liberation Maiden Sin	Hijiri Fuwa		
2013	Drakengard 3	Three		
2014	Super Heroine Chronicle	Aoi Kannazuki/Blue Angel, Tiffania		
2014	Persona Q: Shadow of the Labyrinth	Fuuka Yamagishi		
2014	Granblue Fantasy	Lennah		
2015	Fate/Grand Order	Altera, Scathach, Brynhildr, Fujino Asagami	Smartphone RPG	
2015	Project X Zone 2	Ciel Alençon, Unknown		
2016	Girls' Frontline	UMP9	iOS, Android	
2016	Onmyoji	Shouzu, Enma		
2016	Fate/Extella	Altera		
2016	Zero Escape: Zero Time Dilemma	Diana		
2017	Dissidia Final Fantasy Opera Omnia	Garnet Til Alexandros XVII		
2017	Tantei Jingūji Saburō: Ghost of the Dusk	Yōko Misono		
2017	Occultic;Nine	Ririka Nishizono		
2017	Xenoblade Chronicles 2	Adenine/Shiki		
2018	Sword Art Online: Fatal Bullet	Zeliska		
2018	Tantei Jingūji Saburō: Prism of Eyes	Yōko Misono		
2018	Persona Q2: New Cinema Labyrinth	Fuuka Yamagishi		
2019	Catherine: Full Body	Catherine		
2019	Eternal City	Watari		[159]
2019	Arknights	Reed, Necrass		
2020	Guns GirlZ	Jyahnar		
2020	Honkai Impact 3rd	Durandal		
2020	Cytus 2	Rin		
2020	Sdorica	Miranda		
2020	Another Eden	Mistrare	iOS, Android	
2020	Azur Lane	Shinano, Vittorio Veneto	iOS, Android	
2021–22	Teppen	Oichi, Sengoku Machine Armor	iOS, Android	
2021	Alchemy Stars	Beverly, Sariel	iOS, Android	
2021	Illusion Connect	Seeger, Kristine, Ophelia	iOS, Android	
2021	Tsukihime -A piece of blue glass moon-	Dr. Arach		
2022	JoJo's Bizarre Adventure: All Star Battle R	Yukako Yamagishi		
2022	Arena of Valor	Lauriel Dimension Breaker	iOS, Android	
2022	Tower of Fantasy	Pepper		
2022	Echocalypse	Shiyu		
2022	Goddess of Victory: Nikke	Emma		
2023–2024	Punishing: Gray Raven	Primal Projection/Ishmael	Android, iOS, Microsoft Windows	
2023	Atelier Resleriana: Forgotten Alchemy & the Liberator of Polar Night	Saskia		
2023	Genshin Impact	Skirk		
2024	Persona 3 Reload	Fuuka Yamagishi		
2025	Zenless Zone Zero	Yixuan		
2025	Cookie Run: Kingdom	Eternal Sugar Cookie		
2026	Wuthering Waves	Hsin	Android, iOS, Microsoft Windows	
2026	Ace Combat 8: Wings of Theve	Carmille Tewy	Microsoft Windows, Xbox Series X/S, PlayStation 5	

=== Tokusatsu ===
List of voice performances in Tokusatsu films
Title	Role	Notes	Source
Avataro Sentai Donbrothers	Mother		

=== Dubbing roles ===
List of voice performances in localizations of overseas shows and films
Title	Role	Notes	Source
iCarly	Morgan, Amber Tate		
Andersen Stories	The Little Mermaid		
Arrow	Isabel Rochev/Ravager		
Burying the Ex	Olivia		
Dark Phoenix	Jean Grey		
Devil May Cry	Eva		
Her	Catherine		
Journey to the West: The Demons Strike Back	The Spider Demon		
The Maze Runner film series	Teresa Agnes		
The Night Of	Andrea Cornish		
Resident Evil: Retribution	Becky		
My Little Pony: Equestria Girls – Legend of Everfree	Gloriosa Daisy		
X-Men: Apocalypse	Jean Grey		

== Discography ==
=== Albums ===
List of albums, with selected chart positions
Title	Album information	Oricon
Title	Album information	Peak position
Kanjiru Tiffania (The Familiar of Zero: Princess no Rondo character CD 2)	Released: September 3, 2008; Catalog No.: COCX-35139	160
Mamiko Noto Character Song Collection	Released: February 25, 2009; Catalog No.: LHCA-5095	66
Jigoku-Shoujo Ending Collection	Released: September 27, 2017; Catalog No.: SBCV-80273	–

=== Singles ===
List of singles, with selected chart positions
Title	Album information	Oricon
Title	Album information	Peak position
"Feel the glow" (Burn Up Scramble character song collection)	Released: March 3, 2004; Catalog No.: NECA-13029	–
"Made in Onnanoko" (Strawberry Marshmallow character CD 3: Ana)	Released: May 11, 2005; Catalog No.: GNCA-0011	–
Zinc White (Strawberry 100% Character File 1)	Released: May 25, 2005; Catalog No.: LACM-4198	–
"More" (The Law of Ueki character song collection)	Released: November 30, 2005; Catalog No.: AVCA-22447	133
"Ashita no te" (あしたの手)	Released: June 28, 2006; Catalog No.: COCC-15905	143
Kinu Watarase (Tetsudou-Musume Character Song Collection, Volume 11)	Released: March 26, 2008; Catalog No.: LACM-4470	129
"Le Secret" (Nogizaka Haruka secret character song 1)	Released: August 29, 2008; Catalog No. GNCA-0116	79
Tomoe (Queen's Blade: Wandering Warrior character + short drama)	Released: July 24, 2009; Catalog No.: ZMCZ-4622	178
"Ao no kiseki" (青のキセキ)	Released: November 23, 2011; Catalog No.: LASM-4124	102

=== Drama CDs ===
List of voice performances in drama audio recordings
Series	Role	Notes	Source
Clannad	Kotomi Ichinose		
Gangsta	Alex Benedetto		
Gyarukan	Kyouko Furuide		
Hayate X Blade	Inukami Isuzu		
Idolm@ster Xenoglossia	Munakata Naze		
Mahou Sensei Negima	Nodoka Miyazaki		
Shinakoi	Yukino Fujibayashi		
Mai Hime Destiny	Yukino Kikukawa		
Nogizaka Haruka no Himitsu	Haruka Nogizaka		
