= Sgt. Frog (TV series) =

Japanese anime television series

- Also known as: Sergeant Keroro
- ケロロ軍曹
- Based on: Sgt. Frog by Mine Yoshizaki
- Developed by: Mamiko Ikeda (#1–103); Masahiro Yokotani (#104–358)
- Directed by: Junichi Sato (chief, #1–103); Yusuke Yamamoto (#1–103); Nobuhiro Kondo (#104–358)
- Music by: Saeko Suzuki
- Country of origin: Japan
- Original language: Japanese
- No. of seasons: 7 (Note: As used on the VHS and DVD releases by Bandai Visual. In Japan, Sgt. Frog aired year-round continuously with regular preemptions in place for specials and sporting events, not split into standard seasonal cycles.)
- No. of episodes: 358 (list of episodes)

Production
- Producers: Yoshikazu Beniya; Norio Yamakawa; Aya Yoshino; Naoki Sasada; Teruaki Jitsumatsu; Kazuhiro Asou; Tomoko Takahashi; Chieo Ohashi; Masayuki Ozaki
- Running time: 24 minutes
- Production companies: TV Tokyo; NAS; Sunrise (Note: As of 2015, the copyright for this work was transferred to BN Pictures.)

Original release
- Network: TXN (TV Tokyo)
- Release: April 3, 2004 – April 3, 2011

Related
- Anime television series

Keroro
- Directed by: Haruki Kasugamori
- Produced by: Tsuyoshi Kikuchi; Hiroyuki Watanabe; Hiromitsu Higuchi
- Written by: Haruki Kasugamori; Mine Yoshizaki
- Music by: SuperSweep co., Ltd.
- Studio: Sunrise (Note: Production assistance for all episodes provided by Gathering.)
- Original network: Animax
- Original run: March 22, 2014 – September 6, 2014
- Episodes: 23
- Anime television series
- Keroro☆ (2026)
- Films
- Keroro Gunsō the Super Movie (2006); Chō Gekijōban Keroro Gunsō 2: Shinkai no Princess de Arimasu! (2007); Keroro Gunso the Super Movie 3: Keroro vs. Keroro Great Sky Duel (2008); Keroro Gunsō the Super Movie: Crushing Invasion, Dragon Warriors (2009); Keroro Gunso the Super Movie: Creation! Ultimate Keroro, Wonder Space-Time Island (2010); New Theatrical Movie Keroro Gunsō: Upon Revival, Immediately Facing the Threat of Earth's Destruction! (2026)

Sgt. Frog (Japanese: ケロロ軍曹, Hepburn: Keroro Gunsō) is a Japanese comedy anime television series based on the manga series of the same name by Mine Yoshizaki. Produced by Sunrise, the series aired on TV Tokyo and its TXN affiliates from April 3, 2004, to April 3, 2011, for 358 episodes and since then, it has spanned six movies, video games and merchandise. A short-form second series titled Keroro (ケロロ), aired from March to September 2014. A third series also titled Keroro premiered in October 2026.

As of 2015, the copyright to the works in the Sgt. Frog series are owned by BN Pictures and since then, it has continued its lifespan through rebroadcasts, character licensing and another movie sequel releasing in June 2026.

== Voice cast ==
Character	Voice actor	English voice actor (Funimation)	English voice actor (Animax)
Sergeant Keroro	Kumiko Watanabe	Todd Haberkorn	Andrea Kwan Sarah Hauser
Private Major Class Tamama	Etsuko Kozakura	Brina Palencia	Alice Beaver
Corporal Giroro	Jouji Nakata; Akiko Hiramatsu (young)	Christopher Sabat	Scott Evans
Sergeant Major Kululu	Takehito Koyasu	Chuck Huber	Michael C. Pizzuto
Lance Corporal Dororo	Takeshi Kusao	J. Michael Tatum	David Lee McKinney
Fuyuki Hinata	Tomoko Kawakami (episodes 1-231) Houko Kuwashima (episodes 232-358)	Leah Clark	Candice Moore
Natsumi Hinata	Chiwa Saito	Cherami Leigh	
Aki Hinata	Akiko Hiramatsu	Jamie Marchi	Candice Moore Gloria Ansell
Narrator	Keiji Fujiwara	R. Bruce Elliott	Michael C. Pizzuto

== Production and release ==
The anime series started airing on TV Tokyo and its TXN affiliates in 2004 and ended in 2011. The anime is produced by TV Tokyo, NAS, and Sunrise and was also rebroadcast on several other channels with over 358 episodes have been created during its seven-year run. Unlike the manga which is aimed at older audiences, the anime adaptation has been toned down to a level suitable for family audiences.

The anime ran almost year-round, with first 51 episodes airing on Saturdays, but the show was moved to Fridays for episodes 52-154. The show returned to Saturdays for episodes 155-307, and the final episodes aired on Sundays.

The term "Pokopen" and "Pokopenjin" are both derogatory words the Japanese historically used to describe China and its people during the Sino-Japanese Wars; thus, they were changed to "Pekopon" & "Pekoponjin" respectively.

The first English-language dub of the show to be released was entitled Sergeant Keroro and aired on Animax Asia, a pay TV channel received in multiple countries in Southeast Asia, including Indonesia, Malaysia, the Philippines, Singapore, and Thailand. It premiered in 2008.

In the United States, ADV had previously announced they had acquired exclusive rights to an English dub of Sgt. Frog (for $408,000). However, on July 4, 2008, it was announced that rights to the English release were transferred to Funimation Entertainment.

ADV Films had originally added a brief teaser page to their website, announcing their licensing of the anime. The site turned to static before playing a short clip of Keroro dancing to "Afro Gunso", then leaving the message "hacked by the frog". This was followed by a press release from ADV on November 20, 2006, stating that they had licensed all Sgt. Frog properties (except the manga, which was already licensed by Tokyopop) for the US. It was once confirmed that the anime dub would be released on DVD in the United States in February 2007. However, ADV Films had never confirmed a release date. ADV announced at the 2007 San Diego Comic-Con that the US release date had been delayed because of TV negotiations but would not comment on which networks they were talking to. In a DVD included with the December issue of Newtype USA was an English-language trailer for Sgt. Frog released by ADV, with voices for Keroro (said to be voiced by Vic Mignogna), Natsumi, Fuyuki, Aki, and the narrator. ADV was 90% done on getting a deal with the show, though they created a separate team to work specifically on it that included people from Summit Entertainment (the company that worked with 4Kids Entertainment during the time they had Pokémon). They had dubbed three episodes, but they were dubbed three times because ADV created three different pilot-packages for television to see which one worked the best. They made an otaku/fan pilot, a mass-market pilot, and a kids' pilot. They received positive responses from three different networks. Cartoon Network liked the mass-market pilot, while Nickelodeon liked the kids' pilot. Nickelodeon told them that they would air the show if ADV got the merchandising rights. However, as of July 4, 2008, the English license for the first 51 episodes of the Sgt. Frog anime was transferred to Funimation Entertainment through a deal with Sojitz.

Funimation released a dubbed version of episode 12B as a test on YouTube to be reviewed by the viewers. Many instances of regional name changes were observed; Natsumi is renamed Natalie, and Giroro's cat was renamed "Mr. Furbottom," (despite being female). Additionally, the word Pekopon was changed to Planet Wuss, Pekoponians were referred to as Wussians, Keron was changed to Frogulon and Keronians were called Frogulonians respectively. The extra-terrestrial frogs' names remained the same as the Japanese version, though shortened by one syllable (e.g. Keroro changed to Kero, Tamama to Tama). The test episode had mixed reviews by fans involving the voice acting, jokes, and name changes.

At Otakon 2009, the first five episodes of Sgt. Frog were screened, where the original versions of the various names that were changed were used. The voice actor for Sergeant Keroro in the test video, Chris Cason, was swapped out for Sergeant Major Kululu's test actor, Todd Haberkorn. Kululu was changed to Chuck Huber, and the narrator also appears to have been changed. Funimation stated at their panel that they were going to keep the anime as similar as possible to its Japanese counterpart, and claimed to only change references from Japanese pop culture (save for those Americans were already familiar with) to references from American pop culture. Those present at the showing seemed to enjoy the changes, and the reception of the official dub was very positive. On February 19, 2011, Funimation announced at Katsucon that they had licensed more episodes of Sgt. Frog.

According to Funimation, as of February 2013, the English dub of Sgt. Frog was "now on hiatus".

On July 31, 2009, Funimation added the first 4 dubbed episodes of the series to their online video portal. After a considerable delay following between the release of the first dubbed episodes, Funimation began making dubbed episodes other than the first 4 available on the portal. Currently, the first 51 subtitled episodes are available on the Funimation video portal and Hulu. The 51 dubbed episodes later expired, although they were all later placed back on the portal and on Hulu. The show is rated TV-PG on the DVDs and on Hulu. Unlike the other versions released outside Japan, the US version remains uncut.

The episode distribution scheme has been slightly changed from the Japanese video releases by Bandai Visual. Although the first 51 episodes are known as "Season 1" in Japan, Funimation has divided the episodes into a "Season 1" and a "Season 2". The Season 1 Part 1 DVD set was released September 22, 2009. It contains episodes 1 through 13, Season 1 Part 2 was released on November 24, 2009, and contains episodes 14 through 26. Season 2 Part 1 was released on January 26, 2010, containing episodes 27–39. In addition, Season 2 Part 2 was released on March 30, 2010, containing episodes 40–51. The first two boxsets were re-released into one Season 1 set on March 29, 2011. The complete Season 2 set followed up on April 26, 2011. Season 3 Part 1 was released to DVD by Funimation beginning on July 26, 2011, containing episodes 52–65. Season 3 Part 2 was released to DVD on August 16, 2011, containing episodes 66–78. A complete Season 3 boxset containing episodes 52-78 was released on November 13, 2012. On all of the box sets, it states, "from the creators of the Gundam series". This is relatively incorrect because Sunrise did not create the Gundam series, they produced it, so it should say "from the studio that brought you Gundam". The creator of Gundam is Yoshiyuki Tomino. After the Funimation home video sets went out of print, Discotek Media re-licensed the North American home video rights. Discotek's release began with season 1 (episodes 1-51) on October 21, 2021, followed by season 2 (episodes 52-103) on June 28, 2022, seasons 3-4 (episodes 104-205) on September 26, 2023, and seasons 5-7 (episodes 206-358) on November 26, 2024.

All three seasons were available on Netflix in North America as of December 2011; however, the first two seasons, and the first half of the third, were removed without warning in January 2013, before the series was completely removed in April of the same year. Crunchyroll added the series to its library in North America on June 17, 2021.

=== Keroro ===
On January 7, 2014, it was announced that a new Flash anime television series entitled Keroro (ケロロ) would premiere on Animax on March 22 of that year. Haruki Kasugamori is the director of the series at Sunrise and the animation studio Gathering is providing assistance with the animation. The series airs during the programming block, Keroro Hour, which airs both the series and reruns of Sgt. Frog. The series features new character designs and includes the characters, New Keroro, Tomosu Hinohara, and Myō Kaneami, all of which were originally manga-only characters. The opening to the series is "Keroro☆Popstar" (ケロロ☆ポップスター), performed by Mayumi Gojo. The flash anime ended on September 6 of the same year, with a total of 23 episodes.

=== Future projects ===
On April 1, 2024, it was announced through a video that the series would receive a new anime project produced by BN Pictures in commemoration of the anime's 20th anniversary. Many of the original cast are reprising their roles. It was later revealed to be a film titled Shin Gekijōban Keroro Gunsō: Fukkatsu Shite Sokkō Chikyū Metsubō no Kiki de Arimasu!, directed by Fumitoshi Oizaki, with Yūichi Fukuda serving as supervising director and screenwriter, and Satoshi Koike serving as character designer. It was released in Japanese theaters in on June 26, 2026 by Kadokawa and Bandai Namco Filmworks. The film features a new rendition of the series' famed "Kero to March" titled "Mata Kaettekita Kero! to March", performed by Ano and Soshina while the ending theme is titled "Kashippanashi Destiny" by Ano.

On December 23, 2025, a new anime television series featuring an all new cast was announced. The series is produced by BN Pictures and directed by Akihiko Sano, with Nobuhiro Kondo serving as chief director, Toshimitsu Takeuchi handling series composition, Hatsue Nakayama designing the characters, and Kan Sawada composing the music. The series premiered on TV Tokyo and its affiliates on October 3, 2026.

== Films ==
Six full-length theatrical movies have been released:

- Super Movie Keroro Gunsou (超劇場版ケロロ軍曹, Chō Gekijō-ban Keroro Gunsō) (2006)
- Chō Gekijōban Keroro Gunsō 2: Shinkai no Princess de Arimasu! (超劇場版ケロロ軍曹2 深海のプリンセスであります!, Chō Gekijō-ban Keroro Gunsō Tsû Shinkai no Purinsesu de Arimasu!) (2007)
- Keroro Gunso the Super Movie 3: Keroro vs. Keroro Great Sky Duel (超劇場版ケロロ軍曹3 ケロロ対ケロロ天空大決戦であります!, Chō Gekijō-ban Keroro Gunsō Surî Keroro tai Keroro, Tenkū Daikessen de Arimasu!) (2008)
- Keroro Gunso the Super Movie 4: Gekishin Dragon Warriors (超劇場版ケロロ軍曹 撃侵ドラゴンウォリアーズであります!, Chō Gekijō-ban Keroro Gunsō Gekishin Doragon Woriāzu de Arimasu!) (2009)
- Keroro Gunso the Super Movie: Creation! Ultimate Keroro, Wonder Space-Time Island (超劇場版ケロロ軍曹 誕生!究極ケロロ奇跡の時空島であります!!, Chō Gekijō-ban Keroro Gunsō Tanjou! Kyuukyoku Keroro, Kiseki no Jikuu-jima, de Arimasu!!) (2010)
- New Theatrical Movie Keroro Gunsō: Upon Revival, Immediately Facing the Threat of Earth's Destruction! (新劇場版ケロロ軍曹 復活して速攻地球滅亡の危機であります!, Shin Gekijō-ban Keroro Gunsō Fukkatsu Shite Sokkō Chikyū Metsubō no Kiki de Arimasu!) (2026)

The first five movies were released on Blu-ray in North America by Discotek Media on August 25, 2026.

An exclusive feature only available for limited time at specific Planetariums was released after the end of the show titled Keroro Gunsō the Super Movie: Take Back the Starry Sky! The Great Chase in the Solar System!! (超投影版 ケロロ軍曹 星空をとりもどせ！ 太陽系大追跡であります！！, Chō Tōei-ban Keroro Gunsō Hoshizora o Torimodose! Taiyōkei Daitsuiseki de arimasu!!), released in 2014.

== Reception ==
Theron Martin of Anime News Network stated that the show is "a remarkably attractive-looking series. Sure, the human character designs give off a vibe very typical of more kid-oriented shows, but the Keronian designs are a wonderful balance of cute, quirky, and (in Giroro's case) mean" while also praising the music as well as the opening and ending themes. Carl Kimlinger also states that "and without tears of laughter to blind us, the show's major shortcomings are only too obvious: the repetitious nature of it, the sometimes uncomfortable tension between its wholesome messages and frivolous treatment of them (particularly in English), the way it occasionally lets Keroro torture Natsumi so long that it gets weirdly sadistic".
