= Ryō Hirohashi =

Japanese voice actress

- 広橋 涼
- Born: August 5, 1977 (age 49); Mitsuke, Niigata, Japan
- Education: Ryukoku University
- Occupation: Voice actress
- Years active: 2002–present
- Agent: Aoni Production
- Notable work: Haibane Renmei as Rakka; Kaleido Star as Sora Naegino; My Hero Academia as Minoru Mineta; Sonic the Hedgehog as Miles "Tails" Prower; Bamboo Blade as Tamaki Kawazoe; Clannad as Kyou Fujibayashi; Blue Archive as Hina Sorasaki; Arknights as Jessica / Shaw
- Height: 160 cm (5 ft 3 in)
- Website: Official profile

Ryō Hirohashi (広橋 涼, Hirohashi Ryō) (born August 5, 1977) is a Japanese voice actress affiliated with Aoni Production. She is known for voicing Miles "Tails" Prower in the Sonic the Hedgehog series.

== Biography ==
Hirohashi was born in Niigata Prefecture, her family's home being a Buddhist temple. Due to family reasons, she attended Ryukoku University in Kyoto, a Buddhist university. Moreover, in the middle of her first year, Hirohashi was told by her parents that she could do what she liked even if it was not related to Buddhism, so Hirohashi sought out what she wanted to do. During her second year, Hirohashi remembered a radio show she used to listen to in middle school and became interested in voice acting, leading her to attend Aoni Coaching School Osaka while attending university at the same time. The radio personality Hirohashi had listened to was a voice actress, and upon learning that such a job exists, she decided to become one herself.

== Filmography ==
=== TV Anime ===
Year	Title	Role	Note
2002	Ai Yori Aoshi	Mihori-san	
2002	Aquarian Age: Sign for Evolution	Girl C	Ep 3
2002	Haibane Renmei	Rakka	
2002	Varanoir Kingdom of Chaos The Universe	Ryuto	
2003	Uchuu no Stellvia	Kazamatsuri Rinna	
2003	Kaleido Star	Sora Naegino	
2003	Sonic X	Miles "Tails" Prower, Cheese	
2004	Area 88	Kim Aba	
2004	Sgt. Frog	Koyuki Azumaya	
2004	Tweeny Witches	Eva	
2005	Magical Canan	Chihaya Hiiragi	
2005	Negima	Anya	
2005	Aria the Animation	Alice Carroll	
2005	Pani Poni Dash!	Suzune Shiratori	
2005	Onegai My Melody	Miko-tan	
2005	Solty Rei	Integra Martel	
2006	Aria the Natural	Alice Carroll	
2006	Onegai My Melody: KuruKuru Shuffle!	Miko-tan, Red the Fairy, Blue the Fairy, Green the Fairy	
2006	Kamisama Kazoku	Lulu	
2006	Twin Princess of Wonder Planet Gyu!		
2006	Coyote Ragtime Show	Franca	
2007	Romeo x Juliet	Antonio	
2007	Bakugan Battle Brawlers	Marucho	
2007	Shining Tears X Wind	Elwyn	
2007	Moribito: Guardian of the Spirit	Saya	
2007	Baccano!	Chane Laforet	
2007	Bamboo Blade	Tamaki Kawazoe	
2007	Clannad	Kyō Fujibayashi	
2007	KimiKiss Pure Rouge	Asuka Sakino	
2008	Aria the Origination	Alice Carroll	
2008	Kyōran Kazoku Nikki	Hyōka Midarezaki	
2008	Akaneiro ni Somaru Saka	Shiraishi Nagomi	
2008	Clannad After Story	Kyō Fujibayashi	
2009	Akikan!	Misaki Miyashita	
2009	Pandora Hearts	Echo/Zwei	
2009	Bakugan Battle Brawlers: New Vestroia	Marucho	
2009	Denpa teki na Kanojo	Ame Ochibana	
2009	Taishō Baseball Girls	Tamaki Ishigaki	
2009	Kanamemo	Yume Kitaoka	
2009	Tatakau Shisho	Kyasariro Totona	
2010	Katanagatari	Pengin Maniwa	
2010	Ichiban Ushiro no Dai Maō	Lily Shiraishi	
2010	Working!!	Aoi Yamada	
2010	Star Driver: Kagayaki no Takuto	Marino Yō	
2011	Bakugan Battle Brawlers: Gundalian Invaders	Marucho	
2011	Astarotte no Omocha!	Unnbjörg "Yuna" Signar	
2011	Double-J	Shizuma Sanada, Uguisu jou	
2011	Working!!	Aoi Yamada	
2011	Tamayura: Hitotose	Komachi Shinoda	
2011	Chibi Devi!	Karin	
2012	Sengoku Collection	Hōjō Sōun	
2012	Mysterious Girlfriend X	Ayuko Oka	
2012	Shining Hearts: Shiawase no Pan	Rouna	
2012	Hyouka	Mamiko Senoue	
2013	Cardfight!! Vanguard: Link Joker	Nagisa Daimonji	
2013	Tamayura: More Aggressive	Komachi Shinoda	
2013	Servant × Service	Daisy	Eps. 8
2013	Gundam Build Fighters	Susumu Sazaki	
2014	Hōzuki no Reitetsu	Kodama	
2014	Mobile Suit Gundam-san	Kycilia-tan	
2014	Gugure! Kokkuri-san	Kohina Ichimatsu	
2014	Gundam Build Fighters Try	Kaoruko Sazaki	
2014–2016	Pretty Guardian Sailor Moon Crystal	Luna	ONA, Seasons 1&2 (Dark Kingdom arc & Black Moon arc); TV Anime, Season 3 (Death Busters arc)
2015	Gintama°	Soyo Tokugawa	
2015	Koufuku Graffiti	Kirin's mother	
2015	Working!!!	Aoi Yamada	
2015	World Trigger	Sayoko Shiki	
2016	My Hero Academia	Minoru Mineta	
2016	Digimon Universe: Appli Monsters	Takeru Wato	
2017	My Hero Academia Season 2	Minoru Mineta	
2017	Land of the Lustrous	Obsidian	
2018	Bakutsuri Bar Hunter	Totta Tachitsute	
2018	My Hero Academia Season 3	Minoru Mineta	
2018	Free! Dive to the Future	Ayumu Kunikida	
2019	7 Seeds	Momotaro Nobi	
2019	My Hero Academia Season 4	Minoru Mineta	
2021	My Hero Academia Season 5	Minoru Mineta	
2021	Kaginado	Kyō Fujibayashi	
2021	World Trigger Season 3	Yukari Obishima	
2022	My Hero Academia Season 6	Minoru Mineta	
2022	To Your Eternity Season 2	Iddy	
2024	Blue Archive the Animation	Hina Sorasaki	
2024	My Hero Academia Season 7	Minoru Mineta	
2025	Blue Exorcist: The Blue Night Saga	Jenny Kal	
2025	My Hero Academia: Final Season	Minoru Mineta	
2025	Hell Teacher: Jigoku Sensei Nube	Kasa-obake	
2026	Mebius Dust	Shirayuki	

=== Films ===
Year	Title	Role	Note
2006	Keroro Gunsō the Super Movie	Koyuki Azumaya	
2007	Keroro Gunsō the Super Movie 2: The Deep Sea Princess	Koyuki Azumaya	
2008	Keroro Gunso the Super Movie 3: Keroro vs. Keroro Great Sky Duel	Koyuki Azayuma	
2009	Keroro Gunsō the Super Movie 4: Crushing Invasion, Dragon Warriors	Koyuki Azayuma	
2010	Keroro Gunsō the Super Movie 5: Creation! Ultimate Keroro, Wonder Space-Time Island	Koyuki Azayuma	
2014	Space Battleship Yamato 2199: Odyssey of the Celestial Ark	Milt Evans	
2018	My Hero Academia: Two Heroes	Minoru Mineta	
2019	My Hero Academia: Heroes Rising	Minoru Mineta	
2021	Pretty Guardian Sailor Moon Eternal The Movie	Luna	2-Part Film, Season 4 of Sailor Moon Crystal (Dead Moon arc)
2021	Aria the Crepusculo	Alice Carroll	
2023	Pretty Guardian Sailor Moon Cosmos The Movie	Luna	2-Part Film, Season 5 of Sailor Moon Crystal (Shadow Galactica arc)
2024	Mobile Suit Gundam: Silver Phantom	Haro	
2026	Doraemon: Nobita and the New Castle of the Undersea Devil	Mizunaka Buggy	
2026	Shin Gekijōban Keroro Gunsō: Fukkatsu Shite Sokkō Chikyū Metsubō no Kiki de Arimasu!	Koyuki Azumaya	

=== Video games ===
Year	Title	Role
2002	Rockman Zero	Alouette
2003	Sonic the Hedgehog video game series	Tails, Cheese, Chocola
2003	Tales of Symphonia	Chocolate
2003	Venus & Braves	Finney
2004	Clannad	Kyō Fujibayashi
2004	Shining series	Elwing
2005	Critical Velocity	Pat
2005	Tales of Legendia	Shirley Fennes
2005	Wild Arms 4	Fiore/Asia
2006	Rockman ZX	Prairie
2007	One Piece: Unlimited Adventure	Popora
2007	Enchanted Arms	Yuki
2010	God Eater Burst	Kanon Daiba
2013	God Eater 2	Kanon Daiba
2016	Granblue Fantasy	Sen
2017	Xenoblade Chronicles 2	Pandoria
2019	Arknights	Shaw / Jessica
2020	Guardian Tales	Scrivener Lahn
2021	Blue Archive	Hina Sorasaki
2021	Shin Megami Tensei V	Miyazu Atsuta
2021	Cookie Run: Kingdom	Tails Cookie
2023	Xenoblade Chronicles 3: Future Redeemed	Linka
2023	Goddess of Victory: Nikke	Mast

=== Dubbing ===
Year	Title	Role	Note
2022	Sonic the Hedgehog 2	Miles "Tails" Prower	Japanese dub
2024	Sonic the Hedgehog 3	Miles "Tails" Prower	Japanese dub
