= Shining Tears X Wind =

Japanese anime series

- Shining Tears X Wind logo

シャイニング·ティアーズ·クロス·ウィンド (Shainingu Tiāzu Kurosu Windo)
- Genre: Action, Adventure, Fantasy
- Created by: Sega
- Anime television series
- Directed by: Hiroshi Watanabe
- Produced by: Masahiro Nakayama
- Written by: Hiro Masaki
- Music by: Kei Haneoka
- Studio: Studio Deen
- Licensed by: NA: Discotek Media
- Original network: Chiba TV, Hiroshima Home TV, Tokyo MX, TV Saitama
- Original run: April 6, 2007 – June 29, 2007
- Episodes: 13

Shining Tears X Wind (シャイニング·ティアーズ·クロス·ウィンド, Shainingu Tiāzu Kurosu Windo) is a Japanese anime based on the PlayStation 2 games Shining Tears and Shining Wind. Shining Tears X Wind presents an adapted version of Shining Wind's story, seen from the perspective of the character Souma. It is directed by Hiroshi Watanabe and produced by Studio Deen. The series started airing in Japan on April 6, 2007, and finished airing on June 29, 2007. The anime has the same opening and ending themes as the game Shining Tears. A sequel to this is a mobile game entitled Shining Wind X, which was released in January 2008.

== Storyline ==
A group of students from St. Luminous College are investigating the mysterious disappearances that are happening all around Tatsumi Town. One student, who was researching a book entitled 'End Earth', which describes an alternate world, also mysteriously disappears. As Mao, a being from the other world, enters their world in order to look for her friend, Zero, she teams up with Souma and Kureha in order to battle a monster who also came to their world. Just when things seem to go their way, an accident teleports Souma and Kureha into another world. To make things more complicated, Zero appears to the two stating that he will now entrust the world to Souma. As they travel this new world, they encounter familiar friends and enemies, and they begin to realize that getting back to their own world is harder than they previously thought.

In End Earth, a war, surrounding a legendary item called "The Holy Grail", begins. Zero later tells Souma that the world will end if Zeroboros, the guardian of time and space, awakens. This guardian will use whoever wins the war as a body.

== Characters ==
=== Real World (Elde) ===
Souma and Kureha, respectively.

Souma Akizuki (秋月 蒼真, Akizuki Souma)
- Voiced by: Souichiro Hoshi
An athletic student who, along with Kureha, was transported to the dream continent, End Earth. At the beginning of the series, Souma has feelings for Kureha, despite knowing that she has feelings for Kiriya; he sometimes gets annoyed at Kiriya for not noticing her feelings for him. He then confesses his affection for her, which apparently is not mutual, shortly before being transported to the other world. After seeing Kureha presumably die, he was able to pull out a legendary sword from Kureha's body. Souma turns out to be a 'Soul Blader', which is a person that can form a sword from the heart of any person he shares similar emotions with. Unlike Kureha, Souma would rather stay in End Earth, as he believes that it is the right place for him and since he thinks that he could be "together" with Kureha in End Earth. Later, after Souma and Kureha meet up with Kiriya and Seena, he departs from the group, leaving Kiriya and Seena to take care of Kureha, realizing that she did not feel the same way about him and thus decided to no longer use Kureha's heart as a Soul Blade, since he knew that her heart had feelings for Kiriya. So, he temporarily uses a katana when there are no Soul Blades around for him to use.
When Souma and Kureha were between dimensions, they were greeted by Zero, who entrusted Souma in guarding the world from then on.
After his second meeting with Zero, he receives one of the Twin Dragon Rings, and begins to see the world in a whole new way. His attitude also shifts from a rash and emotional state, to having a calm and understanding demeanor. Souma becomes a sort of mediator, not taking any sides, and travels with Lazarus, Ryuna, Elwyn, and Blanc Neige, in his mission to protect and save the world. After expressing his desire to join Weissritter, he is nominated as its proxy leader. In the end, after seeing Mao's sad and tearful face, he realizes his true feelings for Mao and her feelings for him. Souma then decides to give up his chance of going back to his own world and decides to stay with Mao and Weissritter.
Out of the rest of the characters, Souma was able to extract the most Soul Blades; having drawn blades from Kureha, Hiruda, Kiriya, who in fact possesses his Holy Grail, and also from all the members of the current Weissritter.
Touka Kureha (呉羽 冬華, Kureha Touka)
- Voiced by: Yui Horie
A student who also happens to work at a shrine as a miko, or shinto priestess. Kureha is skilled in the art of archery, or kyūdō. She was transported to End Earth with Souma after they helped Mao defeat a monster. Upon their arrival, she was attacked by monsters and presumably died. Fortunately, she was revealed to be unscathed after Souma pulled out a sword from her body, the Spirit Sword Snow Moon Flower (霊剣 雪月華, Ryōken Setsu Getsu Ka). After Kiriya and Souma's fight, she joins Kiriya and the other Luminous Knights. Kiriya can also draw a sword from her, the Spirit Sword Blazing Sunlight (霊剣 日輪烈光, Ryōken Nishirin Rekkō).
Kureha has feeling for Kiriya, but she never expresses them to him. In the end, she returns to her own world, together with Kiriya and Seena.
Kaito Kiriya (霧谷 魁斗, Kiriya Kaito)
- Voiced by: Akira Ishida
A quiet and shy student who receives a message from an elven woman from End Earth. When he tells his friends, the group dismisses the message as they believe it to only be a dream. Kiriya is a skilled swordsman; ranging from kendo to fencing. It is said that no one could beat him if he was to fight seriously. The cherry blossom of their college transports him and Seena to End Earth right after Souma and Kureha, taking the entire building as well. He becomes the knight for an independent mercenary group called the 'Luminous Knights', which is started by Seena.
Like Souma, Kiriya is also a Soul Blader, who uses Seena's "heart" as a sword. Kiriya is completely oblivious to Kureha's and Seena's feelings for him, the latter being one of his childhood friends. He later forms a close bond with an elf named Xecty, who is later revealed to be an artificial recreation of the Elven Queen. Until Xecty's death, he was confident in his mission to have Saionji admit defeat. Since the start of the war, his attitude shifted from his shy and quiet self, to a rash and emotional state, who sees that fighting is the only way to win (the complete opposite to Souma's change of behavior).
He is later revealed to hold Souma's Holy Grail, Souma's Ultimate Soul Blade (究極心剣, Kyūkyoku Shinken). The one who holds his Holy Grail is Xecty.
In the end, he chooses to return to his own world, together with Kureha and Seena.
Kanon Seena (椎名 夏音, Shiina Kanon)
- Voiced by: Nana Mizuki
A student who belongs to the Student Council just like the other characters. She, along with Kiriya, are later transported to End Earth shortly after Kureha and Souma. Upon their arrival, Seena and Kiriya form an independent mercenary group called the Luminous Knights; with Seena as the leader. She lets Kiriya use her heart as a sword only to allow him to fight, the Gun Sword Blade Cannon (砲剣 ブレイドカノン, Hōken Bureido Kanon).
Seena is also very skilled in fencing.
In the end, she returns to her own world, together with Kiriya and Kureha.
Haruto Saionji (西園寺 春人, Saionji Haruto)
- Voiced by: Ryotaro Okiayu
An heir to a rich family and Student Council President. He, along with Hiruda, are transported to End Earth before the other main characters. When he first encounters his old friends in End Earth, he is revealed to be an enemy. He became the Emperor of Baelgard, and goes by the name "Traihard".
Like Souma and Kiriya, he is also a Soul Blader, and chooses to draw swords from Baelgard's four guardians, which includes Reia Hiruda. Seeing Soul Bladers as "chosen ones", he offers Kiriya and Souma to join him in his crusade. Saionji plans to conquer all of End Earth, under the pretense that he is actually "saving" it from darkness. His plans, however, are thwarted by Killrain's release of dark energy. After Hiruda reverts to her normal self, Hiruda attempts to rescue Saionji when he is linked to the dark tower, with his life in danger. It is then that Saionji realizes her true feelings for him, and in return, he seems to develop feelings for her also, resulting in him being able to draw his Holy Grail from her heart.
In the end, he decides to stay in End Earth, together with Hiruda, Xecty, and Jin-Crow in Baelgard, to restore the forest back to its former glory.
Saionji is an extremely talented swordsman; he was capable of defeating Kiriya in a duel with normal swords.
Reia Hiruda (蛭田 麗亜, Hiruda Reia)
- Voiced by: Kumi Sakuma
A seemingly innocent and quiet girl, who is devoted to Saionji. She found the book that allows herself and Saionji to be brought into End Earth. Though she wants to follow him, she does not want to be engulfed in darkness, so she develops a dark second personality, one that will do all the things that she does not want to. She becomes one of Baelgard's four guardians, the Hellfire Alchemist, Hildareia. Her alter ego prefers the darkside, and even betrays Saionji by siding with Killrain after he takes over the dark elven army. She often does experiments on many elves, turning them into mindless soldiers for Baelgard. Her dark soul blade is called Mythical Beast Sword Mysteltain (妖獣剣 ミストルティン, Yōjūken Misutorutin). Destroying the evil personality's soul blade is the only way to bring back the original Reia Hiruda.
The good personality contains Saionji's Holy Grail, Saionji's Ultimate Soul Blade (究極心剣, Kyūkyoku Shinken), which was instrumental in defeating Er Fahren. She decides to stay in End Earth, together with Saionji, Xecty, and Jin-Crow in Baelgard, to restore the forest back to its former glory.

=== End Earth ===
==== Valeria Country ====
===== Mercenary Knighthood Weissritter =====
Zero (ゼロ, Zero)
- Voiced by: Souichiro Hoshi
Zero is Xion, or what is left of his soul. His angelic wings represent the two entities inside his body, the black one resembles Zeroboros, the white one resembles what is left of Xion, but for all causes, Xion no longer exists. It seems he went to Elde to find someone able to replace him as the Guardian of End Earth. He later chooses Souma, and after meeting him between worlds, states that he now 'entrusts' the world to him. He was shown to have still possessed the Twin Dragon Rings, but gave Souma one of the rings, telling him to use it to see the true world.
He keeps running from Mao, as some time before, he unwillingly killed Ryuna (she impaled herself upon his sword) in order to destroy Zeroboros, who lived inside her, but instead it possessed him, making him sprout black wings form his back. During that altercation he also killed Lazarus. It was Mao's calling that made him fight Zeroboros' possession, turning one of the black wings white, thus leaving a piece of Xion's soul. He later accepted himself as no longer a human, and revived Ryuna and Lazarus using the capsules in the Sea Dragon King Ruins.
He decides to leave the group and is currently watching the world, entrusting Souma with protecting the world in his place.
Mao (マオ, Mao)
- Voiced by: Chiwa Saito
A quarter-beast; she has a pair of cat-like ears. She is also the Princess of Bestia. She traveled to Souma's world looking for Zero. In the process, she accidentally sent Souma and Kureha into her world. She previously saw Xion standing next to the dead bodies of Lazarus and Ryuna. Since Xion flew away before telling her that he has been possessed by Zeroboros, she was left there confused and in shock. This prompted her search for Zero, whom her country of Bestia had placed on the wanted list for murdering a priestess: Ryuna. Though she explains that this makes it easier for her to find him. She is also the true leader of Weissritter. Souma is able to draw a soul blade with fire properties from her, the Beast King Sword Lion King's Flame Dance (獣王剣 獅子王炎舞, Jūōken Shishiō Enmu). Her particular soul blade becomes Souma's preferred soul blade. She falls in love with Souma and her feelings for him are revealed when she cries when he wants to leave, which moves him and he decides to stay with her in End Earth.
Ryuna (リュウナ, Ryuuna)
- Voiced by: Misato Fukuen
A priestess of Etwarl Shrine who believes in Souma. Zeroboros lived inside her, so in order to stop him, she committed suicide by throwing herself into Xion's sword. She was later resurrected by Zero, along with Lazarus. Souma is able to pull a broadsword type soul blade from her called Holy Dragon Sword Heavenly Cloud Bush (聖龍剣 アマノムラクモ, Seiryūken Amanomurakumo); it has the power to paralyze its enemies with a blinding light.
Lazarus (ラザラス, Razarasu)
- Voiced by: Yoshinori Sonobe
Note: Though Japanese versions translated the name as Razalus, the official English translation became Lazarus.
A Dragonian tribesman, who swore to protect Souma. He is also a friend to Ryuna, who acknowledged Zero's intentions. He was killed by Xion when he got possessed by Zeroboros, but was later resurrected by Zero, along with Ryuna. Souma is able to draw an enormous single-bladed sword from him called Holy Dragon Blade Solid Outrage (聖龍刀 逆鱗金剛, Seiryūtō Gekirinkongō).
Elwyn (エルウィン, Eruuwin)
- Voiced by: Ryou Hirohashi
Note: Though Japanese versions translated the name as Elwing, the official English translation became Elwyn.
An old friend of Zero from the Elf race, and is also the princess of Fontina. Elwyn is now traveling with Souma, and had mentioned that she would kill Zero if he abuses his powers. Souma is able to draw a soul blade with lightning properties from her, the Wind Thunder Sword Blitzbringer (風雷剣 ブリッツブリンガー, Kazeraiken Burittsuburingā).
Blanc Neige (ブラン·ネージュ, Buran Nēju)
- Voiced by: Ayako Kawasumi
An old friend of Zero and an Ice Sorceress, who lives in an ice house and showers with ice. She is also the princess of Runevale. She is considered a beauty, but is often cold toward others.Souma is able to draw a soul blade with ice and snow properties from her, the Ice Snow Sword Glass-Diamond (氷雪剣 グラスディアマンド, Hyōsetsuken Gurasu Diamando).
For unexplained reasons, the remaining members of Weisritter (Dr. Pios, Volg, Cupido and Keiner) do not appear in the anime nor is any mention made of them by their former allies.

==== Liberia Country ====
===== Holy Kingdom Philias =====
Clalaclan Philias (クララクラン·フィリアス, Kurarakuran Firiasu)
- Voiced by: Ayako Kawasumi
Princess and Priestess of Philias' Tower of the Sun.
Caris Philias (カリス·フィリアス, Karisu Firiasu)
- Voiced by: Umeka Shouji
Prince of Philias, thus the future king, and Clalaclan's younger brother. He was victim of a curse by Shumari, which made him very sick, but was later healed by Houmei. In the last episode, he becomes the king of Philias.
Raidel (ライデル, Raideru)
- Voiced by: Hirohiko Kakegawa
Priest of Seiran.

===== United Trading Nation Seiran =====
Rouen (ロウエン, Rouen)
- Voiced by: Daisuke Matsuoka
The King of Seiran. Before becoming king, he was the captain of a pirate crew, but his great conviction and good heart made him win the trust of the beastmen. In the last episode, he becomes a captain again, leaving the throne to Hyouun. In the game, he joins Weissritter.
Shumari (シュマリ, Shumari)
- Voiced by: Tetsuharu Ōta
Chancellor of Seiran who had the appearance of a nine-tailed fox. He was responsible for the assassination of Astraea's queen and of the curse bestowed upon Caris. He is later killed by Baelgard's moving fortress 'Eisen Sarg', right before he was to kill Souma.

L to R: Hyouun, Kouryuu, Houmei, Raihi, and Rouen.

Raihi (ライヒ, Raihi)
- Voiced by: Naoki Imamura
One of Seiran's five generals. A tiger-like warrior, who is a good friend of Hyouun. He is very proud of his skills as a warrior.
Basou (バソウ, Basou)
- Voiced by: Takahiko Sakaguma
One of Seiran's five generals. A quiet centaurian warrior. He acts as King Rouen's scout.
Enu (エンウ, Enu)
- Voiced by: Kazunari Tanaka
One of Seiran's five generals. A bird-like warrior.
Kouryu (コウリュウ, Kouryuu)
- Voiced by: Kunihiro Kawamoto
One of Seiran's five generals. A bow-wielding turtle-like warrior. When sober, he is very understanding, however, when he is drunk, he fights others for no apparent reason.
Hyoun (ヒョウウン, Hyouun)
- Voiced by: Hiroki Yasumoto
One of Seiran's five generals. He was ordered to watch over Houmei. He is unofficially considered part of the Luminous Knights due to his involvement with Houmei who is revealed to be his older sister. He has fallen in love with human girls, particularly Kureha and Seena, but he has to keep these feelings to himself due to Houmei's intervention. In the last episode, he becomes the king of Seiran.
Houmei (ホウメイ, Houmei)
- Voiced by: Chiwa Saito
The Priestess of Seiran's Tower of Rain Water. Centuries ago, she tried to destroy the world. Due to that, she was imprisoned in the forbidden lands of Konron. She later joined the 'Luminous Knights' as their tactician. Despite her appearance, she is actually 3000 years old.
In the game, she is actually of the same dragon race as Hyoun although doesn't look like it. An event in the game explains this connection. In the anime, she is referred to as an elf.

===== Demonic Alchemy Empire Baelgard (Former Elven Kingdom Astraea) =====
Zechti Ein (ゼクティ·アイン, Zekuti Ain)
- Voiced by: Houko Kuwashima
One of Baelgard's four guardians, who is an artificial life-form made by Hiruda, using an ancient weapon as base. She is in fact Killrain's sister, Celestia, as Hiruda made her body as Xecty using Celestia's cells, but then she ended up getting infected by the darkness and Hiruda created a dark matter to absorb the forces of darkness, preventing her from further infection.
During a duel with Kiriya, an earthquake causes the two to fall into a cavern. Kiriya talks with Xecty and tells her the importance of hope and believing in your self, forming a close bond with her. Later, during the fight between Kiriya and Saionji, she gets in the middle and is stabbed by Saionji, sacrificing her life in order to stop the war. She explains to him that she did it in order to give hope to the world, and that Kiriya is her hope. Her spirit then joins the wind, as a way to protect both. She is later revived by one of the pods from the Sea Dragon King Ruins, and joins the Luminous Knights. She also becomes the priestess of Astraea's Tower of the Wind. Her soul blade is called Sword of Emperors Excelion (剣帝 エクセリオン, Kentei Ekuserion). She also contains Kiriya's Holy Grail, being drawn from her Kiriya's Ultimate Soul Blade (究極心剣, Kyūkyoku Shinken).
She decides to stay together with Saionji, Hiruda, and Jin-Crow in Baelgard, to restore the forest back to its former glory.
Zeed (ジード, Jīdo)
- Voiced by: Takeshi Kusao
One of Baelgard's four guardians. Also an immortal due to a contract with his demon sword. He is in fact Philias' late prince, Leon, now under the control of his demon sword. His soul blade is called Holy Armor Sword Balmunc (聖鎧剣 バルムンク, Seigaiken Barumunku), and the sword and armor are similar to the ones used by Leon. He was later defeated by Souma, resulting in Leon's spirit becoming free from the demon sword's control.
Killrain (キルレイン, Kirurein)
- Voiced by: Takashi Kondo
One of Baelgard's four guardians. Originally a normal and kind elf, until he was infected by the darkness. Though he is the brother of Astraea's queen, Celestia, he kept Xecty from knowing her true origins. He's shown to possess immense dark energy, as shown after Xecty's death, when he released said energy as a powerful blast, which covered nearly all of Liberia in an icy blizzard. His anger prompted him to blame all living souls, and after controlling the dark elven army of Baelgard, he plans to destroy everything. Only after Souma, Kiriya, and Saionji use the combined powers of their Holy Grails, that his soul is liberated. Together with his sister Celestia, he decides to stay behind and be sealed in the other dimension.
His soul blade is called Demon Gun Sword Gallatin (魔砲剣 ガラティン, Mahōken Garatin), a giant sword able to shoot laser beams. Unlike the others, Killrain himself transforms into a giant sword, rather than having the sword drawn from within him.

==== Others ====
Jin-Crow (ジンクロウ, Jinkurou)
- Voiced by: Atsushi Ono
A mysterious birdman. Jin-Crow is a friend to Killrain, before the latter was infected by dark energy. He can still be seen at Killrain's side, but he also searches for a way to help his friend overcome the darkness. He gives Kiriya the location of the ancient weapons, and later escorts Kiriya's group to Bestia. In the past, he, Killrain, and Leon, Clalaclan's older brother, swore peace to the countries, but then Shumari's plot ruined their plans. He decides to become Xecty's protector. Together with Saionji, Hiruda, and Xecty, they are busy restoring the forest back to its former glory.
The Eternal Forest's Chanting (久遠の森の詠み手, Kyūen no Mori no Eimishu)
- Voiced by: Houko Kuwashima
She is a mysterious elven girl who spoke to Kiriya through dreams. She is later revealed to be the spirit of Celestia, the elven queen of Astraea, whose cells were used to create Xecty. With her help, Xecty becomes the priestess of Astraea's Tower of the Wind. She decides to be with her brother, the soul of the liberated Killrain, and they are sealed together in the other dimension.
Lassi (ラッシィ, Rasshii)
- Voiced by: Junko Hagimori
A strange little fellow who guided Souma and Elwyn through an icy blizzard. He guided the group to Celestia through a secret opening in the forest to the north of Philias. There, he is revealed to be the Spirit King of the Wind. He has an affinity towards elves who can strangely understand him. After Celestia, he joins Xecty in Baelgard, to restore the forest to its former glory.

== Soul Blades ==
Here's a list of all known Soul Blades, from the game Shining Wind and the anime.

=== Souma ===
Kureha: Spirit Sword Snow Moon Flower (霊剣 雪月華, Ryōken Setsu Getsu Ka)
Ryuna: Holy Dragon Sword Heavenly Cloud Bush (聖龍剣 アマノムラクモ, Seiryūken Amanomurakumo)
Elwyn: Wind Thunder Sword Blitzbringer (風雷剣 ブリッツブリンガー, Kazeraiken Burittsuburingā)
Blanc Neige: Ice Snow Sword Glass-Diamond (氷雪剣 グラスディアマンド, Hyōsetsuken Gurasu Diamando)
Lazarus: Holy Dragon Blade Solid Outrage (聖龍刀 逆鱗金剛, Seiryūtō Gekirinkongō)
Mao: Beast King Sword Lion King's Flame Dance (獣王剣 獅子王炎舞, Jūōken Shishiō Enmu)
Kiriya: Ultimate Soul Blade (究極心剣, Kyūkyoku Shinken)

=== Kiriya ===
Seena: Gun Sword Blade Cannon (砲剣 ブレイドカノン, Hōken Bureido Kanon)
Kureha: Spirit Sword Blazing Sunlight (霊剣 日輪烈光, Ryōken Nishirin Rekkō)
Clalaclan: Demon Sword Caladbolg (魔剣 カラドボルグ, Maken Karadoborugu)
Caris: Holy Sword Excalibur (聖剣 エクスカリバー, Seiken Ekusukaribā)
Houmei: Deva Sword Dragon's Tail Fan (仙剣 竜尾扇, Senken Ryū Bisen)
Hyoun: Treasure Sword Heaven Dragon's Seven Fangs (宝剣 七天竜牙, Hōken Shichi Tenryū Ga)
Rouen: Mythical Blade Heavenly Tidal Wave (魔砲剣 ガラティン, Yōtō Ama Tsunami)
Jin-Crow: Heaven Sword Echna Bird (天剣 エクナバード, Tenken Ekuna Bādo)
Xecty: God Spear Bow Sword Brionac (神槍弓剣 ブリューナク, Kamisōkyūken Buryūnaku)
Xecty (End Section): Ultimate Soul Blade (究極心剣, Kyūkyoku Shinken)

=== Traihard ===
Xecty: Sword of Emperors Excelion (剣帝 エクセリオン, Kentei Ekuserion)
Hildareia: Mythical Beast Sword Mysteltain (妖獣剣 ミストルティン, Yōjūken Misutorutin)
Zeed: Holy Armor Sword Balmunc (聖鎧剣 バルムンク, Seigaiken Barumunku)
Killrain: Demon Gun Sword Gallatin (魔砲剣 ガラティン, Mahōken Garatin)
Hiruda Reia: Ultimate Soul Blade (究極心剣, Kyūkyoku Shinken)

== Episode list ==
No.	Title	Original release date
1	"Today X The Other World" "Gendai Kurosu i Sekai" (現代×異世界)	April 6, 2007
A group of students are concerned over mysterious disappearances happening all around Tatsumi Town. A being from another world complicates the lives of two students and accidentally sends them to another world.
2	"Heart X Sword" "Kokoro Kurosu Ken" (心×剣)	April 13, 2007
Souma and Kureha become more familiar with the dream continent, End Earth. As they are greeted by the people of the Seiran territory, word of a battle against the Philias territory would later thrust the two students into battle. The two are shocked when they realize that their enemy is their own friends, Kiriya and Seena.
3	"Friend X Love" "Tomo Kurosu Koi" (友×恋)	April 20, 2007
When Souma realized that the enemy they are battling against is Kiriya and Seena, he begins to fight Kiriya even though they are friends. When Kiriya refuses to fight seriously against him and tries to reason with Souma, telling him that the people of Seiran tricked him, Kureha is suddenly used as a hostage by Shumari. The group then comes together to rescue Kureha.
4	"Mission X Companion" "Shimei Kurosu Nakama" (使命×仲間)	April 27, 2007
Souma's disappearance troubles the group, but they soon realize that they have an even bigger problem. They encounter an old friend who is in control of a massive army, proclaiming himself Emperor of Baelgard. Meanwhile, Souma meets Zero face-to-face.
5	"Elf X Elf" "Yousei Kurosu Yousei" (妖精×妖精)	May 4, 2007
During the battle between Kiriya and Xecty, one of Saionji's four guardians, an earthquake occurs, causing both warriors to fall into a cavern, trapping them. Meanwhile, Souma and his new group comes across a Baelgard camp, where elves are turned into mindless soldiers for Baelgard.
6	"Hot Sand X Ice and Snow" "Nessa Kurosu Hyousetsu" (熱砂×氷雪)	May 11, 2007
A berserk Xecty escapes from her cell, tracks down Kiriya, and attacks him, but she is retrieved by Hiruda, who temporarily reverts to her original personality after her alter ego's soul blade is defeated by Souma.
7	"Wind X Tears" "Kaze Kurosu Namida" (風×涙)	May 18, 2007
Souma attempts to negotiate a peaceful settlement between Kiriya's and Saionji's parties, but fails. As Kiriya and Saionji face off in an all-out war, only Xecty's sacrifice can stop them, but this act has unforeseen consequences.
8	"Weissritter X Zero" "Shiro Kishi Kurosu Rei" (白騎士×零)	May 25, 2007
After Souma is rescued by Zero, Zero reveals his past as a member of Weissritter and tells a story about his life. At the same time, the Luminous Knights and Jin-Crow arrive at Valeria and meets Mao.
9	"Despair X Hope" "Zetsubou Kurosu Kibou" (絶望×希望)	June 1, 2007
Xecty's death prompts Killrain to release an immense dark force, which also causes him to go mad with vengeance. He starts his destruction by controlling the Baelgard elven army, and goes after Saionji. Before Saionji engages in battle with Killrain, he entrusts Souma with a capsule containing the world's "hope". Meanwhile, Mao encounters Blanc Neige, and furthers her search for Zero and Souma.
10	"Reunion X Bond" "Saikai Kurosu Kizuna" (再会×絆)	June 8, 2007
Souma is unexpectedly reunited with of all his friends. The reunion begins with Souma leading the depressed Kiriya to meet the world's "hope". Souma and Mao catch up and talk about Zero, who at the same time secretly overhears their conversation and decides to depart from their presence. Later, Mao and Souma fight together against Zeed.
11	"Spirit X Witch" "Seirei Kurosu Majo" (精霊×魔女)	June 15, 2007
Lassi guides the combined group to meet the elf Kiriya saw in his dreams. Xecty becomes the priestess of the tower of the wind, but Killrain's actions prevented her from completely releasing the tower's power. The group now decides to storm Killrain's place and liberate Saionji, whose power prevents them from restoring the tower of the wind's power. In the process, Souma and his friends restore Hiruda back to normal by destroying her soul blade, and she helps the group by leading them to Killrain and Saionji.
12	"Light X Darkness" "Hikari Kurosu Yami" (光×闇)	June 22, 2007
After arriving at the destined place, the group splits up, focused on rescuing Saionji. After fighting their way towards Saionji, the group is unable to pierce the barrier surrounding him until Hiruda arrives and tries it herself. Meanwhile, Killrain is revealed to be possessed and becomes Er Fahren. Later, each of the three Soul Bladers discovers who their 'Holy Grails' resides in.
13	"World X Heart" "Sekai Kurosu Kokoro" (世界×心)	June 29, 2007
By combining the power of the three Ultimate Soul Blades, the soul bladers are able to defeat Er Fahren and liberate Killrain's soul. Killrain and Celestia decide to be sealed behind together. Saionji and Hiruda decide to remain behind to help restore the forests of Baelgard. Using the power of his Ultimate Soul Blade, Souma is able open the path to his own world. After seeing Mao's depressed face, Souma decides to stay in End Earth leaving only Kiriya, Seena and Kureha to go back to their own world.

== Music ==
Opening theme

- "Shining Tears"
  Lyrics by: Natsuko Kondo
  Composition and arrangement by: Gou Takahashi
  Song by: Souichiro Hoshi

Ending theme

- "Light's Silhouette" (光のシルエット, Hikari no Shiruetto)
  Lyrics by: Yurie Kokubu
  Composition and arrangement by: Masaki Iwamoto
  Song by: Souichiro Hoshi

== Staff ==
- Original Work: Sega
- Director: Hiroshi Watanabe
- Series Composition: Hiro Masaki
- Screenplay: Hiro Masaki
- Music: Kei Haneoka
- Original Concept: Tsuyoshi Sawada
- Original Character Design: Tony Taka
- Character Design: Mariko Emori, Yukiko Ban
- Art Director: Michiyo Miki
- Director of Photography: Shinya Kondou
- Producer: Masahiro Nakayama
- Animation Producer: Masahiro Toyosumi
- Color Setting: Shinji Matsumoto
- Editing: Masahiro Matsumura
- Music Director: Fumiko Harada
- Planning: Tsuyoshi Sawada
- Sound Director: Ayako Misawa
- Animation Company: Studio Deen
