= Takeshi Kusao =

Japanese actor and singer (born 1965)

- 草尾 毅
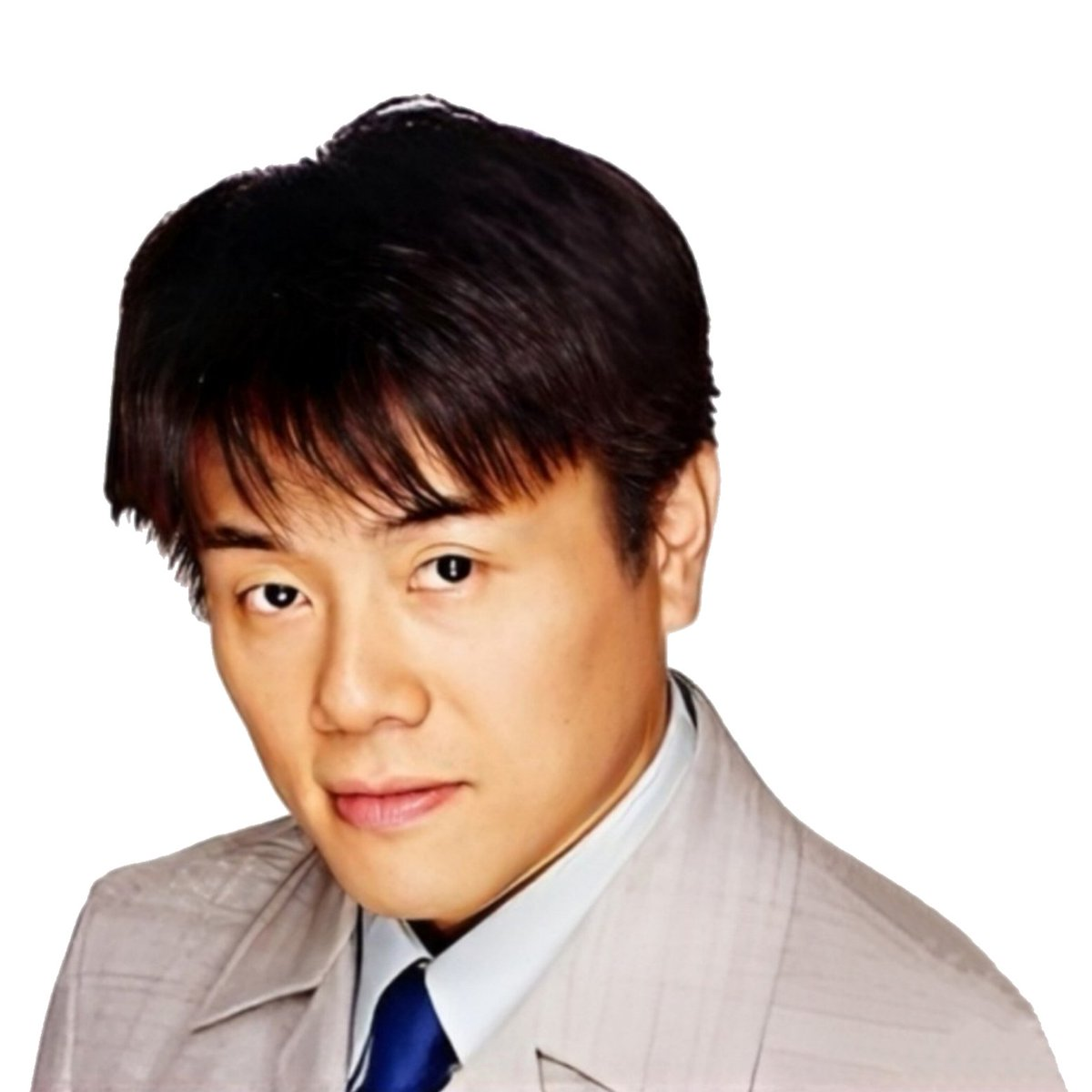
- Born: November 20, 1965 (age 60); Tokorozawa, Saitama, Japan
- Occupations: Actor; voice actor; singer
- Years active: 1987–present
- Agent: Aoni Production
- Spouse: Yuka Saitō (m. 2015)
- Children: 2
- Website: Official profile

Takeshi Kusao (草尾 毅, Kusao Takeshi; born November 20, 1965) is a Japanese actor, voice actor, and singer. He was born in Tokorozawa, Saitama, and is affiliated with Aoni Production. Among his many roles, he is best known for his voice roles as Trunks in Dragon Ball Z, Kabutack in B-Robo Kabutack, Hanamichi Sakuragi in Slam Dunk, Ryo Sanada in Yoroiden Samurai Troopers, Parn in Record of Lodoss War, Coco/Kōji Kokoda in Yes! PreCure 5, Ky Kiske in Guilty Gear, Yukimura Sanada in Samurai Warriors and Warriors Orochi, Dororo in Sgt. Frog, and Mao in Code Geass.

== Personal life ==
In May 2015, he married fellow voice actress Yuka Saitō and they have a child.

He and his wife later had a second child born on November 13, 2021.

== Filmography ==
=== Television animation ===
1988

- Saint Seiya, Wolf Nachi
- Transformers: Super-God Masterforce, Clouder/Double Clouder
- Yoroiden Samurai Troopers, Ryo Sanada

1989

- Akuma-kun, Kirihito
- Dragon Ball Z, Piegerro
- Momotaro Densetsu, Tarou Urashima

1990

- Knights of Ramune & 40, Lamune
- Brave Exkaiser, Green Laker
- RPG Densetsu Hepoi, Ryuuto

1991

- Getter Robo Go, Gou Ichimonji
- Dragon Ball Z, Trunks

1992

- Ashita e Free Kick, Shun Godai
- Tetsujin 28-go FX, Saburo Natsuki
- Super Bikkuriman, Phoenix

1993

- Slam Dunk, Hanamichi Sakuragi

1995

- Mobile Suit Gundam Wing, Mueller
- Dragon Ball Z, Trunks, Upa
- Sorcerer Hunters, Kou

1996

- Knights of Ramune & 40 Fire, Lamuness I
- GeGeGe no Kitarō, Kasa-bake
- Dragon Ball GT, Trunks

1997

- Clamp School Detectives, Takeshi Shukaido
- Revolutionary Girl Utena, Kyoichi Saionji
- Shinkai Densetsu Meremanoid, Madam

1998

- Steam Detectives, Le Bled
- Kare Kano, Hiroyuki Miyazawa
- The Kindaichi Case Files, Kawashima
- Shadow Skill, Darkness, Snake Man
- Case Closed, Osamu Honda, Tōru Amuro (Episode 1150+)

2000

- Excel Saga, Key
- Saiyuki, Kougaiji
- Digimon Adventure 02, Revolmon
- Boys Be..., Young Man
- Descendants of Darkness, Tetsuhiro Abiko

2001

- Super GALS!, Takeru
- Run=Dim, Suguru Saeki

2002

- Spiral: The Bonds of Reasoning, Kousuke Asazuki
- Midnight Horror School, Docky
- Naruto, Gōzu
- Pecola, Jabatto-san
- One Piece, Koza

2003

- Inuyasha, Bankotsu
- Saiyuki Reload, Kougaiji
- D.N.Angel, Krad
- Cheeky Angel, Pierre
- Planetes, Sully
- Pluster World, Gingardo
- One Piece, Zap

2004

- Sgt. Frog, Dororo, Dokuku
- Saiyuki Gunlock, Kougaiji
- Samurai 7, Hyogo
- Hit o Nerae!, Kenjiro Kurume
- Ring ni Kakero 1, Ishimatsu Katori

2005

- Gaiking: Legend of Daikū-maryū, Jian Xin, Haccho
- Moeyo Ken, Ukon Tanaka
- Speed Grapher, Ran Yurigaoka
- Solty Rei, Will
- Beet the Vandel Buster, Rosegoat

2006

- Ergo Proxy, Rogi
- Sumomomo, Momomo, Tenka Koganei
- Powerpuff Girls Z, Hiro
- Naruto, Gouzu
- Happy Lucky Bikkuriman, Prince Yamato
- Yume Tsukai, Michiaki Mishima
- One Piece, Jaguar D. Saul

2007

- Yes! PreCure 5, Coco
- GeGeGe no Kitarō, Makoto Washio
- Code Geass, Mao
- Darker than Black, Zhi-Jun Wei, EPR Member (ep 16)
- MapleStory, Anji

2008

- Yes! Precure 5 GoGo!, Coco/Kōji Kokoda
- Skip Beat!, Ushio Kurosaki
- Tytania, Alses Tytania
- Sands of Destruction, Frog Master

2009

- Sōten Kōro, Xiahou Dun
- Beyblade: Metal Fusion, Busujima

2010

- Inuyasha: The Final Act, Magatsuhi, Demon of the Shikon Jewel
- Super Robot Wars Original Generation: The Inspector, Vigagi
- Digimon Fusion, Kiriha Aonuma, Ballistamon, Bagramon, Greymon, ZekeGreymon
- The Animal Conference on the Environment, Pao the Panda
- Dragon Ball Kai, Trunks
- Naruto Shippuden, Shiranami
- Ring ni Kakero 1: Shadow, Ishimatsu Katori

2011

- The World's Greatest First Love, Hasegawa
- Fujilog, Osamu Fujiyama
- Maji de Watashi ni Koi Shinasai!, Gakuto Shimazu
- Yondemasu yo, Azazel-san, Sariel
- Ring ni Kakero 1: Sekai Taikai-hen, Ishimatsu Katori
- One Piece, Gol D Roger (Young)

2012

- Gon, Jack
- Saint Seiya Omega, Unicorn Jabu
- Tanken Driland, Rogai
- Nyaruko: Crawling with Love, Nyaruo

2013

- Kingdom, Jiang Zhang

2014

- Captain Earth, Reito Hirosue/Pointer
- Sgt. Frog, Dororo
- Phi Brain: Puzzle of God, Zagadka
- Minna Atsumare! Falcom Gakuen, Adol, Phan
- World Trigger, Masafumi Shinoda

2015

- Samurai Warriors, Sanada Yukimura
- Dragon Ball Kai, Trunks
- Dragon Ball Super, Trunks
- Magic Kaito 1412, Detective Delon
- Minna Atsumare! Falcom Gakuen SC, Phan

2016

- Dragon Ball Super, Future Trunks
- One Piece, Karasu

2017

- Dragon Ball Super, Lavender, Narirama

2018

- Major 2nd, Fujii
- Bakutsuri Bar Hunter, Tōma Tachitsute
- Black Clover, Ladros
- GeGeGe no Kitarō, Wolfgang

2019

- Senki Zesshou Symphogear XV, Enki
- Kishiryu Sentai Ryusoulger, Pterardon

2020

- Digimon Adventure:, Joe Kido
- Noblesse, Ragar Kertia

2021

- Yashahime, Mayonaka/Mahiruma

2023

- Bungo Stray Dogs 4, Mushitarō Oguri

2024

- Kinnikuman: Perfect Origin Arc as Nemesis
- Dragon Ball Daima, Trunks

2025

- Guilty Gear Strive: Dual Rulers as Ky Kiske

=== Original video animation (OVA) ===
- Guyver (1989), Sho Fukamachi/Guyver
- Megazone 23 Part III (1989), Eiji Takanaka
- Ys (1989–1991), Adol Christin
- Record of Lodoss War (1990), Parn
- Ys II: Castle in the Heavens (1992–1993), Adol Christin
- Casshan: Robot Hunter (1993), Tetsuya Azuma/Casshan
- Ranma ½ (1994), Shinnosuke
- Saint Seiya: Hades (2002–2006), Capricorn Shura
- Tales of Phantasia (2004–2006), Cless Alvein (Cress Albane)
- Dogs: Bullets & Carnage (2009), Magato

=== Theatrical animation ===
- Akira (1988), Kai (debut)
- Saint Seiya: Warriors of the Final Holy Battle (1989), Sailors
- Mobile Suit Gundam F91 (1991), Dorel Ronah
- Slam Dunk (1994), Hanamichi Sakuragi
- Slam Dunk: Conquer the Nation, Hanamichi Sakuragi! (1994), Hanamichi Sakuragi
- Slam Dunk: Shohoku's Greatest Challenge! (1995), Hanamichi Sakuragi
- Slam Dunk: Howling Basketman Spirit!! (1995), Hanamichi Sakuragi
- Inuyasha the Movie: Fire on the Mystic Island (2004), Jūra
- Keroro Gunsō the Super Movie (2006), Lance Corporal Dororo
- Chō Gekijōban Keroro Gunsō 2: Shinkai no Princess de Arimasu! (2007), Lance Corporal Dororo
- Keroro Gunso the Super Movie 3: Keroro vs. Keroro Great Sky Duel (2008), Lance Corporal Dororo
- Keroro Gunso the Super Movie 4: Gekishin Dragon Warriors (2009), Lance Corporal Dororo
- Keroro Gunso the Super Movie: Creation! Ultimate Keroro, Wonder Space-Time Island (2010), Lance Corporal Dororo
- Dragon Ball Z: Battle of Gods (2013), Trunks, Gotenks
- Short Peace (2013), Frog
- Dragon Ball Z: Resurrection 'F' (2015), Future Trunks
- Dragon Ball Super: Broly (2018), Trunks
- Free! Road to the World: The Dream (2019), Ryuji Azuma
- Dragon Ball Super: Super Hero (2022), Trunks, Gotenks
- Detective Conan: One-Eyed Flashback (2025), Rei Furuya / Tōru Amuro
- Shin Gekijōban Keroro Gunsō: Fukkatsu Shite Sokkō Chikyū Metsubō no Kiki de Arimasu! (2026), Lance Corporal Dororo

=== Video games ===
- SegaSonic the Hedgehog (1993), Sonic the Hedgehog
- Dragon Ball Z 2: Super Battle (1995), Future Trunks
- Tales of Phantasia (1995), Cless Alvein (Cress Albane), Chester Burklight
- Abalaburn (1998), Blood
- Rakugaki Showtime (1999), John Calibur
- Rockman DASH 2 ~Episode 2: Ooi Naru Isan~ (2000), Gaga
- Super Robot Wars Alpha (2000), Dorel Ronah
- Super Robot Wars Alpha 2 (2003), Dorel Ronah
- Advance Guardian Heroes (2004), Dylan
- Blood Will Tell (2004), Tahōmaru
- Saint Seiya: The Sanctuary (2005), Capricorn Shura
- Saint Seiya: The Hades (2007), Capricorn Shura
- Super Robot Wars: Original Generations (2007), Vigagi
- Code Geass: Lost Colors (2008), Mao
- Cosmic Break (2008), Lios
- Tales of the World: Radiant Mythology Cless Alvein (Cress Albane)
- Ys Seven (2009), Adol Christin
- Super Robot Wars NEO (2009), Lamune
- Ys vs. Trails in the Sky (2010), Adol Christin
- The Sly Collection (2011), Sly Cooper (Japanese dub, only on PS3 version)
- Tales of the World: Radiant Mythology 3 (2011), Cless Alvein (Cress Albane)
- PlayStation Move Heroes (2011), Sly Cooper (Japanese dub)
- Saint Seiya Senki (2011), Capricorn Shura
- Heroes Phantasia (2012), Dororo
- Tales of the World: Reve Unitia (2012), Cless Alvein (Cress Albane)
- PlayStation All-Stars Battle Royale (2013), Sly Cooper (Japanese dub)
- Guilty Gear Xrd -SIGN- (2014), Ky Kiske
- Guilty Gear Xrd -REVELATOR- (2015), Ky Kiske
- Warriors All-Stars (2017), Yukimura Sanada
- Super Smash Bros. Ultimate (2019), Solo (Dragon Quest IV)
- Jump Force (2019), Future Trunks
- Super Robot Wars T (2019), Saizo Tokito
- Dragon Ball Z: Kakarot (2020), Future Trunks, Trunks (Kid), Gotenks, Opa
- Saint Seiya: Rising Cosmo (2020), Capricorn Shura
- Guilty Gear -STRIVE- (2021), Ky Kiske

Unknown date

- Dragon Ball series (Trunks)
- Guilty Gear series (Ky Kiske, Robo-Ky)
- Samurai Warriors series (Yukimura Sanada)
- Samurai Warriors: Spirit of Sanada (Yukimura Sanada)
- Tales of Phantasia (Cless Alvein (Cress Albane) & Chester Burklight (Chester Barklight))
- Warriors Orochi series (Yukimura Sanada)

=== Tokusatsu ===
- B-Robo Kabutack (1997), Kabutack, Junichiro Kunitachi
- Voicelugger (1999), Voicelugger Sapphire/Takeshi Tenma
- Tokusou Sentai Dekaranger (2004), Bokudenian Biskes
- Mahou Sentai Magiranger (2005), Magical Cat Smoky
- Juken Sentai Gekiranger (2007), Pyon Biao
- Tokumei Sentai Go-Busters (2012), Jishakuloid
- Unofficial Sentai Akibaranger (2012), various Sentai male voices, Kameari Alpaca
- Zyuden Sentai Kyoryuger (2013), Debo Supokoun
- Kishiryu Sentai Ryusoulger (2019), Kishiryu Pterardon/Kishiryu Ptyramigo (Voiced by Masaki Terasoma (Kishiryu Tyramigo))

=== Dubbing ===
==== Live-action ====
- Leonardo DiCaprio
  - This Boy's Life (Toby)
  - What's Eating Gilbert Grape (Arnold "Arnie" Grape)
  - The Basketball Diaries (Jim Carroll)
  - Romeo + Juliet (Romeo)
  - Titanic (Broadcasting inflight Version) (Jack Dawson)
  - Celebrity (Brandon Darrow)
  - The Man in the Iron Mask (King Louis XIV/Phillipe)
- Zachary Levi
  - Chuck (Chuck Bartowski)
  - Shazam! (2021 The Cinema edition) (Shazam)
  - Harold and the Purple Crayon (Harold)
- Ralph Macchio
  - The Karate Kid (Daniel LaRusso)
  - The Karate Kid Part III (Daniel LaRusso)
  - Karate Kid: Legends (Daniel LaRusso)
- American Psycho (Patrick Bateman (Christian Bale))
- The Benchwarmers (Clark Reedy (Jon Heder))
- Brideshead Revisited (Lord Sebastian Flyte (Ben Whishaw))
- Buffy the Vampire Slayer (Oliver Pike (Luke Perry))
- Fargo (Josto Fadda (Jason Schwartzman))
- Final Destination (2002 TV Asahi edition) (Alex Browning (Devon Sawa))
- Galgameth (Prince Davin (Devin Oatway))
- The Last Emperor (1989 TV Asahi edition) (Puyi (15 years old) (Wu Tao))
- The Namesake (Nikhil "Gogol" Ganguli (Kal Penn))
- Napoleon Dynamite (Napoleon Dynamite (Jon Heder))
- Painted Faces (Teenage Cheng Lung)
- Pleasantville (David/Bud Parker (Tobey Maguire))
- Radio (James "Radio" Kennedy (Cuba Gooding Jr.))
- Stuck on You (Robert "Bob" Tenor (Matt Damon))
- Willow (Willow Ufgood (Warwick Davis))

==== Animation ====
- ¡Mucha Lucha! (Ricochet)
- The Adventures of Tintin (Tintin)
- Teenage Mutant Ninja Turtles: Mutant Mayhem (Baxter Stockman)
