= Keroro (2026 TV series) =

Japanese anime television series

- Keroro☆
- Key visual for the series
- ケロロ軍曹☆
- Based on: Sgt. Frog by Mine Yoshizaki
- Directed by: Nobuhiro Kondo (chief); Akihiko Sano
- Series composition: Toshimitsu Takeuchi
- Character designer: Hatsue Nakayama
- Music by: Kan Sawada
- Country of origin: Japan
- Original language: Japanese

Production
- Editor: Daisuke Imai
- Studio: BN Pictures (Note: Production assistance (制作協力) provided by Bridge and Aisle.)
- Producers: Takanori Ito; Dai Kimura; Norio Yamakawa; Ryouga Suzuki
- Production companies: Keroro Committee (Note: Label consisting of various companies.)

Original release
- Networks: TXN (TV Tokyo), AT-X, TUF
- Release: October 3, 2026 – present

Related
- Video game

Keroro Gunsō☆ Hachamecha TV Shō ~Shōkin Getto dai sakusen dearimasu!~
- Developer: Rengame
- Publisher: Rengame
- Platform: Nintendo Switch, Windows
- Released: JP: December 9, 2026

Keroro☆ (Japanese: ケロロ軍曹☆, Hepburn: Keroro Gunsō☆; stylized in all caps) is a Japanese comedy anime television series based on the manga series Sgt. Frog by Mine Yoshizaki, serving as the third television installment in the Sgt. Frog series, following the 2004 anime television series and the 2014 short anime series. Produced by BN Pictures, the series premiered in October 2026.

== Voice cast ==
Character	Voice actor
Sergeant Keroro	Makoto Koichi
Private Second Class Tamama	Rika Nagae
Corporal Giroro	Toshiki Masuda
Sergeant Major Kululu	Kōsuke Echigoya
Lance Corporal Dororo	Satoshi Inomata
Fuyuki Hinata	Yuki Sakakihara
Natsumi Hinata	Minori Fujidera
Momoka Nishizawa	Sumire Morohoshi
Paul Moriyama	Yoshimitsu Shimoyama
Mutsumi Hōjō	Hiiro Ishibashi
Koyuki Azumaya	Koko
Angol Mois	Kana Ichinose
Aki Hinata	Chiwa Saitō
Narrator	Satomi Arai

== Production and release ==
On December 23, 2025, it was announced that a new Sgt. Frog television anime series, set to feature an entirely new voice cast, was to release in Q4 2026.

On September 7, 2026, a trailer was streamed worldwide on the series' official YouTube channel, featuring the series' staff and the voice actors for Keroro, Tamama, Giroro, Kululu, and Dororo.

Produced by BN Pictures with Bridge and Aisle handling production assistance, the series is directed by Akihiko Sano, with Nobuhiro Kondo serving as chief director, with series composition by Toshimitsu Takeuchi, characters designed by Hatsue Nakayama, and music composed by Kan Sawada, who composed the 2004 series' opening theme Kero! to March. The series premiered on October 3, 2026, on TV Tokyo and its affiliates. The opening theme song is "Kirai nochi Suki!" (キライのちスキ！; 'From Hate to Love!'), performed by Ano, while the ending theme song is "Himitsu no Panorama" (秘密のパノラマ; 'Secret Panorama'), performed by Purple Bubble. Crunchyroll streams the series worldwide except Asia-Pacific.

Prior to the start of the series' broadcast, a preview screening of the first two episodes of the series was held at the United Cinemas Toyosu on September 26, 2026, with the voice actors of the Keroro Platoon making an appearance. On October 3, 2026, the day of the series' premiere in Japan, the voices of Angol Mois, Aki Hinata, and the Narrator were revealed to be Kana Ichinose, Chiwa Saitō, and Satomi Arai respectively.

=== Episodes ===
No.	Title	Directed by (Note: Production staff information is taken from the ending credits of each episode.)	Written by	Storyboarded by	Original release date
1	"Keroro's Dreamland"; Transliteration: "Keroro no Dorīmu Rando" (Japanese: ケロロのドリームランド)	Akihiko Sano	Toshimitsu Takeuchi	Akihiko Sano	October 3, 2026
2	"My Friend Is an Invader"; Transliteration: "Tomodachi wa Shinryaku-sha" (Japanese: ともだちは侵略者)	Unknown	Unknown	TBA	October 10, 2026
2	"Sergeant Keroro, in a Windowless, Bathless Room with History"; Transliteration: "Keroro Gunsō no, Furo Nashi Mado Nashi Iwakutsuki" (Japanese: ケロロ軍曹の、風呂なし窓なしいわくつき)	Unknown	Unknown	TBA	October 10, 2026
3	"The secret of 2"; Transliteration: "Himitsu no 2-ri" (Japanese: ひみつの2人)	Unknown	Unknown	TBA	October 17, 2026
3	"Heart-pounding! Momoka's Thrilling Tour Operation!"; Transliteration: "Dokidoki ★ Momoka no Tokimeki Tsuā dai Sakusen!" (Japanese: ドキドキ★桃華のときめきツアー大作戦！)	Unknown	Unknown	TBA	October 17, 2026
4	"Angol Mois' One More End of the Century ~A Wonderful Apocalypse with Uncle~"; Transliteration: "Angoru = Moa no Wanmoa Seikimatsu ~Oji-sama to Sutekina Shūmatsu o~" (Japanese: アンゴル＝モアのワンモア世紀末 ～おじさまと素敵な終末を～)	Unknown	Unknown	TBA	October 24, 2026
4	"The Rainy Season is Total Chaos!"; Transliteration: "Tsuyu-ba wa Shuraba!" (Japanese: 梅雨場は修羅場！)	Unknown	Unknown	TBA	October 24, 2026
5	"Invasion! The Red Menace"; Transliteration: "Shūrai! Akai aitsu" (Japanese: 襲来！赤いアイツ)	TBA	TBA	TBA	October 31, 2026
5	"The 59th Kissho Academy Grand Sports Festival"; Transliteration: "Dai Go-Jū Kyū-kai Kisshō Gakuen dai Taiiku-sai" (Japanese: 第五十九回吉祥学園大体育祭)	TBA	TBA	TBA	October 31, 2026
6	"Fuyuki and Momoka's Skin of Their Teeth Secret Base Tour"; Transliteration: "Fuyuki to Momoka no Himitsu Kichi Kichi Tanbō" (Japanese: 冬樹と桃華の秘密基地きち探訪)	TBA	TBA	TBA	November 7, 2026
7	"The Dangerous Duo"; Transliteration: "Abunai Futari" (Japanese: あぶないふたり)	TBA	TBA	TBA	November 14, 2026
7	"How About Some Radio Tonight?"; Transliteration: "Koyoi wa Chotto Rajiode mo" (Japanese: 今宵はちょっとラジオでも)	TBA	TBA	TBA	November 14, 2026
8	"Is It a Cavity? No, It's a Caries War"; Transliteration: "Mushibadeshou ka? Īe, kariesu u~ō" (Japanese: 虫歯でしょうか？いいえ、カリエス・ウォー)	TBA	TBA	TBA	November 21, 2026
8	"Aki Becomes a Middle School Student"; Transliteration: "Aki, Chūgakusei ni Naru" (Japanese: 秋、中学生になる)	TBA	TBA	TBA	November 21, 2026

== Media ==
=== Video game ===
A video game based on the series, Keroro Gunsō☆ Hachamecha TV Shō ~Shōkin Getto dai sakusen dearimasu!~ (ケロロ軍曹☆ ハチャメチャTVショー ～賞金ゲット大作戦であります！～), developed and published by Rengame is scheduled to be released for the Nintendo Switch and Windows on December 9, 2026.
