= Bakutsuri Bar Hunter =

Japanese media franchise

爆釣バーハンター (Bakutsuri Bā Hantā)
- Manga
- Written by: Sakaban Suzuki
- Published by: Shogakukan
- Magazine: CoroCoro Comic
- Original run: 15 March 2018 – May 2019
- Video game
- Developer: Bandai Namco Entertainment
- Publisher: Bandai Namco Entertainment
- Genre: Fishing
- Released: March 2018
- Anime television series
- Directed by: Kenji Seto
- Written by: Yoichi Kato
- Music by: Takatsugu Wakabayashi
- Studio: Toei Animation; Studio Gallop
- Original network: TXN (TV Tokyo)
- Original run: 2 October 2018 – 26 March 2019
- Episodes: 25

Bakutsuri Bar Hunter (爆釣バーハンター, Bakutsuri Bā Hantā; "Big Catch Bar Hunter") is a Japanese media franchise created by Bandai, Shogakukan, Studio Gallop, and Toei Animation. It consists of a toy line that started releasing on March 17, 2018, a Nintendo 3DS game, a manga series and an anime television series.

== Characters ==
Totta Tachitsute (立津手 トッタ, Tachitsute Totta)
Voiced by: Ryō Hirohashi
Potepen (ポテペン)
Voiced by: Yumi Uchiyama
Kiba Samejima (鮫島 キバ)
Voiced by: Mitsuki Saiga
Shuwajirō (シュワ次郎)
Voiced by: Kouta Nemoto
Touma Tachitsute (立津手トウマ, Tachitute Touma)
Voiced by: Takeshi Kusao
Tonpei Tachitsute (立津手トンペイ, Tachitute Tonpei)
Voiced by: Daisuke Sakaguchi
Totta Mother (トッタの母)
Voiced by: Umeka Shōji

== Media ==
=== Anime ===
An anime television series by Toei Animation and Studio Gallop aired from October 2, 2018. The opening theme is "Bakutsuri Soul", performed by SymaG and the ending theme is "Yūjō ZABOOOON!!", performed by Mikako Komatsu.

=== Manga ===
A manga series has been serialized in Shogakukan's CoroCoro Comic since March 15, 2018.

=== Video game ===
A Nintendo 3DS game was released in March 2018. It consists of a barcode camera and a fishing reel accessory called a Bakutsuri Bar Rod. The game itself is a free download from the Nintendo eShop. The player uses the barcode camera on a barcode to open a fishing spot, which allows them to fish for "bar soul" lifeforms.
