= Keroro Gunso the Super Movie: Creation! Ultimate Keroro, Wonder Space-Time Island =

Keroro Gunso the Super Movie 5: Creation! Ultimate Keroro, Wonder Space-Time Island
- Theatrical release poster
- 超劇場版ケロロ軍曹 誕生!究極ケロロ 奇跡の時空島であります!!
- Directed by: Suzumu Yamaguchi; Junichi Sato (chief)
- Screenplay by: Hiroshi Yamaguchi
- Based on: Sgt. Frog by Mine Yoshizaki
- Starring: Kumiko Watanabe; Houko Kuwashima; Yūtarō Honjō; Tamaki Matsumoto
- Narrated by: Keiji Fujiwara
- Edited by: Imai Daisuke
- Music by: Saeko Suzuki
- Production companies: Sunrise (Note: As of 2015, the copyright for this work is owned by Bandai Namco Pictures.); Bridge
- Distributed by: Kadokawa Pictures
- Release date: February 27, 2010 (Japan)
- Running time: 75 minutes
- Country: Japan
- Language: Japanese
- Box office: $2,560,000

Keroro Gunso the Super Movie 5: Creation! Ultimate Keroro, Wonder Space-Time Island (超劇場版ケロロ軍曹 誕生!究極ケロロ 奇跡の時空島であります!!, Chō Gekijō-ban Keroro Gunsō: Tanjou! Kyuukyoku Keroro, Kiseki no Jikuu-jima, de arimasu!!) is a 2010 Japanese animated comic science fiction film directed by Junichi Sato and Susumu Yamaguchi. It is the fifth installment in the Sgt. Frog series created by Mine Yoshizaki.

The film was released in theatres on February 27, 2010, in Japan. It was produced by Sunrise, the studio behind the anime series, alongside Bridge.

== Plot ==
Fuyuki Hinata has a nightmare that one day the world will be destroyed by an unknown threat. His nightmare involves the Hinata household is attacked and the entire Keroro Platoon is entombed in stone, with Keroro being killed and himself walking around an empty black space. Fuyuki sees a burning ship crashing from the sky and turns around the Keroro Platoon (minus Keroro) is frozen in stone, but wakes up from the nightmare.

Alisa Southerncross then comes and throws an artifact at him, which causes Fuyuki to stumble off the couch. Fuyuki greets Alisa, and notes that the artifact looks like Keroro. Then both hypothesize that the statue comes from Easter Island, which appears as an important location several times in the previous stories, due to visual similarities it has with the other statues there.

Then the house floods with water, promptly followed by Natsumi yelling at them and telling them to clean it up. Fuyuki explains to Keroro about the statue and its relation to the "Moai" statues at Easter Island. Keroro shrugs this off as Fuyuki talking about Alisa that goes by Angol Mois. Keroro sees this as a challenge, and decides him and his platoon are going to conquer the Easter Island. They go to Easter Island, and during the trip there, they encounter a storm and crash down onto the island.

They wake up later and find themselves to be in captivity of the local peoples of Easter Island. The rest of the Keroro Platoon search for Keroro and Fuyuki, as an enemy known as AkuAku is trying to exterminate all humanity. With Keroro and Fuyuki trying to find a way home. Fuyuki wakes up and meets Lo and Rana who are trying to cook Keroro.

They both have a joyful reunion and learn about Kanini. Giroro and Kululu find out about Fuyuki and Keroro sneaking out to the island and decide to get Dororo and Tamama because AkuAku has been making trouble and they might be endanger.

== Cast ==
Character	Voice actor
Sergeant Keroro	Kumiko Watanabe
Fuyuki Hinata	Houko Kuwashima
Alisa Southerncross	Akiko Yajima
Natsumi Hinata	Chiwa Saito
Private Second Class Tamama	Etsuko Kozakura
Corporal Giroro	Jōji Nakata
Angol Mois	Mamiko Noto
Akuaku	Shigeru Chiba
Sergeant Major Kululu	Takehito Koyasu
Lance Corporal Dororo	Takeshi Kusao
Rana	Tamaki Matsumoto
Io	Yûtarô Honjô
Aki Hinata	Akiko Hiramatsu
Saburo	Akira Ishida
Momoka Nishizawa	Haruna Ikezawa
Koyuki Azumaya	Ryō Hirohashi
Narrator, Paul Moriyama	Keiji Fujiwara

== Reception ==
The film debuted in the Japanese box office sixth, earning US$662,651 on 144 screens. It was the 13th most watched anime film of the first of half of 2010 in Japan.
