= Etsuko Kozakura =

Japanese voice actress

- 小桜エツコ
- Born: Kumi Uchino (内野 久美); February 22, 1971 (age 55); Mizuho, Tokyo, Japan
- Other name: Ecchan (エッちゃん)
- Occupation: Voice actress
- Years active: 1991–present
- Agent: Little Portal
- Height: 148 cm (4 ft 10 in)
- Spouse: Jin Domon
- Website: little-portal.com

Kumi Domon (土門 久美, Domon Kumi; née Uchino (内野), born on February 22, 1971), better known by her stage name Etsuko Kozakura (小桜エツコ, Kozakura Etsuko), is a Japanese voice actress from Mizuho. She was formerly with Ohsawa Jimusho, but now heads her own agency called Little Portal with husband Jin Domon. Some of her major roles are Daizu Noyama in Azuki-chan, along with Yukana Nogami, Ryo-Ohki in the Tenchi Muyo! series, Coquelicot along with Noriko Hidaka and Kikuko Inoue in Sakura Wars, Piplup in Pokémon, Tamama in Sgt. Frog, and Yōhei Yamada in Chi's Sweet Home. In video games, she is the voice of Omochao in the Sonic series, Jibanyan in the Yo-kai Watch series, and Yoriko Nikaidou alongside Sakiko Tamagawa, Akiko Hiramtsu and Rica Matsumoto of JAM Projects, Sakakibara Yoshiko, and Akira Ishida in You're Under Arrest!, You're Under Arrest! Fast and Furious Season 2 & Your Under Arrest Full Throttle Season 3.

== Filmography ==
=== Anime ===
List of voice performances in anime
Year	Title	Role	Notes	Source
1991	Little Ghosts, There, Here, and Where	Nezumi no Chiiki	Debut role	
1991	Reporter Blues	Child	Episode 23, Minor Role	
1992	Floral Magician Mary Bell	Bit		
1992–93	Chōdendō Robo Tetsujin 28-go FX	Futaba		
1992	Crayon Shin-chan	Mimiko Sakura, Fumie		
1992–2005	Tenchi Muyo! series	Ryo-Ohki		
1992–93	Mikan Enikki	Koringo		
1992	Tomatoman	Tentopea		
1994	Final Fantasy: Legend of the Crystals		OVA	
1994–2008	You're Under Arrest series	Yoriko Nikaidou		
1995	Magical Girl Pretty Sammy	Ryo-Ohki	OVAs	
1995	Azuki-chan	Daizu Noyama		
1995–98	El-Hazard	Alielle Relryle		
1996–97	Magical Project S	Ryo-Ohki		
1998	Bomberman B-Daman Bakugaiden	Blue Bomber		
1998–99	Kurogane Communication	Lillith		
1999	Legend of Himiko	Tadami		
1999	Digimon Adventure	Pinochimon		
1999	Guruguru Town Hanamaru-kun (ja:ぐるぐるタウンはなまるくん)	Chiyurin		
2000	Gate Keepers	Megane		
2000	Time Bokan 2000: Kaitou Kiramekiman	Kirameeru		
2000	NieA 7	Wakaba the Cat		
2000	Android Kikaider: The Animation	Etsuko Sarutobi		
2001	Ghost Stories	Mary	Episode 11, minor role	
2001	PaRappa the Rapper	Julia the Cat		
2002	Panyo Panyo Di Gi Charat	Meek (Mike)		
2002–05	Mirmo!	Mirmo		
2002	Atashin'chi	Yuri Ishida		
2002-12	Genki Genki Nontan	Raccoon		
2003	Sakura Wars: Ecole de Paris	Coquelicot	OAV	
2003–04	Kaleido Star	Jonathan		
2003–04	Di Gi Charat Nyo!	Mike Charat		
2003–04	Full-Blast Science Adventure - So That's How It Is	Dai		
2003	Inuyasha	Ippō		
2004–11	Sgt. Frog	Private Second Class Tamama		
2004	Sakura Wars: Le Nouveau Paris	Coquelicot	OAV	
2005	Sonic X	Cosmo		
2006	Pokémon the Series: Diamond and Pearl	Dawn's Piplup		
2006	Intrigue in the Bakumatsu – Irohanihoheto	Benimaru		
2006	Happy Lucky Bikkuriman	Kikoshi Kori miko		
2006	Akubi Girl	Ruru-chan		
2008–09	Chi's Sweet Home	Youhei Yamada	Also Chi's New Address	
2008–11	Stitch!	Waracchi	Ep. 10	
2009	Tamagotchi!	Watchlin		
2008–11	Inazuma Eleven	Kamezaki Kappa	Ep. 100	
2010–11	Nura: Rise of the Yokai Clan	Natto Kozou		
2011	Nichijou	Biscuits 2-go		
2011	Future Diary	Orin Miyashiro		
2012	Is This a Zombie? of the Dead	Eu (imaginary)	Eps. 5–7	
2012	Yappo Island (ja:ふしぎのヤッポ島 プキプキとポイ)	Poi		
2012	Pocket Monsters: Best Wishes! Season 2	Dawn's Piplup		
2014–18	Yōkai Watch	Jibanyan		
2015	Yo-Kai Watch: Enma Daiō to Itsutsu no Monogatari da Nyan!	Jibanyan		
2016–21	My Hero Academia	Chiyo Shuzenji		
2018	Zoids Wild	Onigiri		
2020	Yo-kai Watch Jam - Yo-kai Academy Y: Close Encounters of the N Kind	Momo		
2021	Pokémon Master Journeys: The Series	Dawn's Piplup		
2025	Okitsura	Oki Memo Shisha		
2025	Me and the Alien MuMu	MuuMuu		

=== Films ===
List of voice performances in films
Year	Title	Role	Notes	Source
1997	Noiseman Sound Insect	Noiseman		
2002	A Tree of Palme	Moo		
2002	Bo nobo no kumomo no ki no koto (ja:ぼのぼの クモモの木のこと)	Popo-kun		
2006	Keroro Gunsō the Super Movie	Private Second Class Tamama		
2006	Atagoal: Cat's Magical Forest	Hideko		
2007	Chō Gekijōban Keroro Gunsō 2: Shinkai no Princess de Arimasu!	Private Second Class Tamama		
2007	Pocket Monsters Diamond & Pearl the Movie - Dialga VS Palkia VS Darkrai	Hikari's Pochama		
2008	Keroro Gunso the Super Movie 3: Keroro vs. Keroro Great Sky Duel	Private Second Class Tamama		
2008	Pocket Monsters Diamond & Pearl the Movie - Giratina and the Sky's Bouquet: Shaymin	Hikari's Pochama		
2009	Keroro Gunso the Super Movie 4: Gekishin Dragon Warriors	Private Second Class Tamama		
2009	Pocket Monsters Diamond & Pearl the Movie - Arceus: To a Conquering Spacetime	Hikari's Pochama		
2010	Keroro Gunso the Super Movie: Creation! Ultimate Keroro, Wonder Space-Time Island	Private Second Class Tamama		
2010	Pocket Monsters Diamond & Pearl the Movie - Supreme Ruler of Illusions: Zoroark	Hikari's Pochama		
2018	Waka Okami wa Shōgakusei!	Suzuki		
2018	Yo-kai Watch: Forever Friends	Nekomata		
2019	Yo-kai Watch Jam the Movie: Yo-Kai Academy Y - Can a Cat be a Hero?	Momo		
2026	New Theatrical Movie Keroro Gunsō: Upon Revival, Immediately Facing the Threat of Earth's Destruction!	Private Second Class Tamama		

=== Video games ===
List of voice performances in video games
Year	Title	Role	Notes	Source
1995	Cyberbots: Full Metal Madness	Devilotte		
1995–97	Tenchi Muyo! series	Ryo-Ohki		
1996	Shimpi no Sekai El-Hazard	Alielle Relryle	Sega Saturn	
1998–present	Sonic the Hedgehog series	Omochao		
1999	Meguri Aishite (ja:めぐり愛して)	Ryou Asamizu	PlayStation	
1999	Himikoden Renkai	Tadami	PlayStation	
2001	Sakura Taisen 3 ~Pari wa Moeteiru ka~	Coquelicot		
2002	Sakura Taisen 4 ~Koi Seyo, Otome~	Coquelicot		
2004	Sakura Taisen Taisen Monogatari ~Mysterious Paris~	Coquelicot		
2006	Tokimeki Memorial Girl's Side: 2nd Kiss	Chiyomi Onoda		
2006	Blue Dragon series	Marumaro		
2007	Final Fantasy Crystal Chronicles: Ring of Fates	Teteo Ojo		
2007	Tales of Innocence	Coder, Ada		
2008	Tokimeki Memorial Girl's Side: 2nd Season	Chiyomi Onoda	Nintendo DS	
2008	Inazuma Eleven	Shourinji Ayumu	Nintendo DS	
2008	White Knight Chronicles	Rocco		
2010	Karada de Kotaeru Atarashii No Tore (体で答える新しい脳トレ)	Mr. Watt	Xbox 360	
2012	Project X Zone	Devilotte	Nintendo 3DS	
2019	Our World is Ended	Junkuma	PC/PS4/Nintendo Switch	
2023	Puzzle Bobble Everybubble!	Bub	Nintendo Switch	

=== Overseas dubbing ===
List of voice performances in overseas dubbing
Title	Role	Notes	Source
The Adventures of Happy Planet	Paintball, Willy		
Angela Anaconda	Gina Rush		
Boy Meets World	Stewart Minkus		
Dr. Quinn Medicine Woman	Brian		
Malcolm in the Middle	Dewey Wilkerson		
Pinky Dinky Doo	Tyler		
Tom and Jerry	Nibbles		
Tom and Jerry: Snowman's Land	Taffy		

== Discography ==
=== Drama audio recordings ===
List of voice performances in drama audio recordings
Title	Role	Notes	Source
Haneda Mitaka no Aozora Douchuu	Arere Uguisudani		
El-Hazard	Alielle Relryle		
Legend of Himiko	Tadami		
The Irresponsible Kids	Eliza		
Tenchi Muyo!	Ryo-Ohki		
Tenchi Muyo Daiichi Otaku ha Dare?	Ryo-Ohki		
Vampire Hunter	Felicia		

== Awards ==
Year	Award	Category	Result
2015	9th Seiyu Awards	Kids Family Award	Won
2016	25th Japan Movie Critics Awards	Best Voice Actor Award	Won
