= Keroro Gunso the Super Movie 4: Gekishin Dragon Warriors =

- Theatrical release poster
- 超劇場版ケロロ軍曹 撃侵ドラゴンウォリアーズであります!
- Directed by: Susumu Yamaguchi
- Screenplay by: Hiroshi Yamaguchi
- Based on: Sgt. Frog by Mine Yoshizaki
- Starring: Kumiko Watanabe; Tomoko Kawakami; Jouji Nakata; Etsuko Kozakura; Takehito Koyasu; Daisuke Gouri; Nana Mizuki; Ikue Ōtani
- Music by: Saeko Suzuki
- Production company: Sunrise (Note: As of 2015, the copyright for this work is owned by BN Pictures.)
- Distributed by: Kadokawa Pictures
- Release date: March 7, 2009
- Running time: 77 minutes
- Country: Japan
- Language: Japanese

Keroro Gunso the Super Movie 4: Gekishin Dragon Warriors (超劇場版ケロロ軍曹 撃侵ドラゴンウォリアーズであります!, Chō Gekijō-ban Keroro Gunsō: Gekishin Doragon Woriāzu de arimasu!) is a 2009 Japanese animated comic science fantasy film directed by Susumu Yamaguchi. It is the fourth film installment in the Sgt. Frog series created by Mine Yoshizaki. The film was released on March 7, 2009, in Japanese theatres and later got released to DVD on July 24, 2009, in Japan.

== Plot ==
Mysterious giant dragon-like creatures called "Dragon Tails" appeared across the world. Due to the danger it could bring, the Keroro Platoon did a worldwide research on the Dragon Tails, but Tamama suddenly disappeared during the research. Because of this, the whole platoon started their search for Tamama and ended up in Mont-Saint-Michel, France where they met mysterious girl named Sion, who holds the mysterious Ryū no Hon (Dragon Book). But little they know about the secrets about her and the worldwide calamity that would destroy the entire world, as they know it.

== Cast ==
Character	Voice actor
Sergeant Keroro	Kumiko Watanabe
Private Second Class Tamama	Etsuko Kozakura
Corporal Giroro	Jōji Nakata
Sergeant Major Kululu	Takehito Koyasu
Lance Corporal Dororo	Takeshi Kusao
Fuyuki Hinata	Tomoko Kawakami
Natsumi Hinata	Chiwa Saitō
Aki Hinata	Akiko Hiramatsu
Shion	Nana Mizuki
Pierre	Daisuke Gouri
Terara	Ikue Ōtani
Koyuki Azumaya	Ryō Hirohashi
Angol Mois	Mamiko Noto
Mutsumi Saburo	Akira Ishida
Paul Moriyama	Keiji Fujiwara
Momoka Nishizawa	Haruna Ikezawa
Narration	Keiji Fujiwara

== Reception ==
During its first week, Keroro Gunso the Super Movie 4: Gekishin Dragon Warriors was placed 5th at the Japanese box office.
