= Sgt. Frog =

Japanese manga series by Mine Yoshizaki

- First New Edition tankōbon volume cover, featuring Sergeant Keroro

ケロロ軍曹 (Keroro Gunsō)
- Genre: Comedy; Science fiction
- Manga
- Written by: Mine Yoshizaki
- Published by: Kadokawa Shoten
- English publisher: NA/UK: Viz Media
- Magazine: Monthly Shōnen Ace; (April 1999 – September 2007, October 2013–present); Kerokero Ace; (October 2007 – September 2013)
- Original run: April 1999 – present
- Volumes: 35
- Manga

Chō Keroro Gunsō UC: Keroro Robo Daikessen
- Written by: Yūtarō Shido; Mine Yoshizaki (original)
- Published by: Kadokawa Shoten
- Magazine: Monthly Shōnen Ace
- Original run: October 2018 – present
- Anime television series
- Sgt. Frog (2004–2011); Keroro (2014); Keroro☆ (2026)
- Films
- Keroro Gunsō the Super Movie (2006); Chō Gekijōban Keroro Gunsō 2: Shinkai no Princess de Arimasu! (2007); Keroro Gunso the Super Movie 3: Keroro vs. Keroro Great Sky Duel (2008); Keroro Gunsō the Super Movie: Crushing Invasion, Dragon Warriors (2009); Keroro Gunso the Super Movie: Creation! Ultimate Keroro, Wonder Space-Time Island (2010); New Theatrical Movie Keroro Gunsō: Upon Revival, Immediately Facing the Threat of Earth's Destruction! (2026)
- Related media
- List of Sgt. Frog video games

Sgt. Frog, known in Japan as Keroro Gunso (Japanese: ケロロ軍曹, Hepburn: Keroro Gunsō; lit. 'Sergeant Keroro' (Note: Kerokero (ケロケロ) is the Japanese onomatopoeia for a frog's ribbit.)), is a Japanese manga series written and illustrated by Mine Yoshizaki, which is published and serialized in Kadokawa Shoten through its Monthly Shōnen Ace magazine since April 1999. The story follows the attempts of a platoon of frog-like alien invaders to conquer Earth. Sergeant Keroro, the titular character, is the leader of the platoon, but is at the mercy of a human family of three after being captured by them. Keroro is forced to do meaningless chores and errands for the family after his army abandons his platoon on Earth.

The series was later adapted into an anime television series by Sunrise, which aired from April 2004 to April 2011. A second short-form series aired from March to September 2014. A new anime project was announced in April 2024 to celebrate the 20th anniversary of the original anime, and was released as a film in June 2026. A new anime television series premiered in October 2026.

The manga was released in North America by Tokyopop from March 9, 2004, to May 10, 2011, and later digitally by Viz Media since December 2014. An English dub of the anime series aired on Animax Asia in 2008 with the title Sergeant Keroro; with Funimation releasing a second 78-episode English dubbed version in North America in 2009, which aired as Sgt. Frog on Crunchyroll, Funimation and later on Netflix, as well as on DVD sets. Discotek Media re-released the Funimation dub in SD Blu-ray in 2021.

In 2005, the manga received the 50th Shogakukan Manga Award for the children's manga category.

== Plot ==
The Keroro Platoon is a group of five, frog-like alien soldiers from Planet Keron. They mean to conquer "Pekopon" (their name for "Earth") but fail each every time they try. Their leader, Sergeant Keroro, is incompetent and has little interest in conquering Pekopon. Instead, he likes making plastic Gundam models, watching TV, or coming up with schemes to make money. The four other members of the platoon are: the adorable but violent Private Second Class Tamama; the bellicose yet tenderhearted Corporal Giroro; the intelligent but mischievous Sergeant Major Kururu; and the disciplined but traumatized Lance Corporal Dororo.

The largest obstacle in the way of their mission is the Hinata Family, who must take care of the Keroro Platoon due to the Keron Army deserting the latter on Earth. Keroro is kept busy with manual labor and constant abuse, primarily from the family daughter, Natsumi. Each member of the platoon finds himself in the care of a human: Giroro's is Natsumi Hinata, whom he falls in love with; Keroro's is Fuyuki Hinata, who considers the sergeant his only true friend; Kururu's is Mutsumi Saburo, who is just as mischievous as him; Dororo's is Koyuki Azumaya, a fellow ninja; and Tamama's is Momoka Nishizawa, who is just as bipolar as him. All are tied to the Hinatas in some way throughout the events in the series.

== Media ==
=== Manga ===
Written and illustrated by Mine Yoshizaki, Sgt. Frog is published and serialized by Kadokawa Shoten through its Monthly Shōnen Ace magazine, and is published in English by Tokyopop. The manga, first aimed at the older audience (teens/adults) from the first to the seventh volume, was toned down once the anime adaptation started (since the TV series was a family show). However, the manga still maintains its suggestive comedy that only the more mature audiences would understand in present volumes.

Tokyopop initially held the American rights to the manga until 2011 when the company ceased operations, which had 21 volumes published by the time their publication ended. Their release has censored nipples drawn in some scenes, in order to get away from the OT (older teen) rating to maintain its Teen rating. Viz Media relicensed the manga for digital release on December 16, 2014.

To commemorate the 20th anniversary of the series, the November issue of Shōnen Ace announced the launch of a new manga on October 26, 2018. Titled Chō Keroro Gunsō UC: Keroro Robo Daikessen (Super Sgt. Frog Ultra Cool: Keroro Robo's Epic Climactic Battle), the series is created by Yūtarō Shido, while Mine Yoshizaki is credited as the original author.

=== Anime ===
An anime television series produced by Sunrise aired from 2004 to 2011, on TV Tokyo and its affiliates. A second short-form series aired from March to September 2014, and a third series premiered in October 2026.

=== Spin-offs and guest appearances ===
- Spin-offs include a manga called Musha Kero that has recently been adapted in the anime. The series has spawned a magazine called Keroro Land that promotes toys, games, media, and events based on the manga and anime.
- Sgt. Keroro, Tamama, Giroro, Dororo and Kululu make cameo appearances in the 1st movie of Kaiketsu Zorori.
- Keroro and Tamama have appearances in the OVA of Lucky Star, and Kagami Hiiragi spends almost all her money on a grip-claw game trying to get a Keroro doll.
- Japanese action RPG game Monster Hunter Tri G has downloadable costumes of Keroro for the humanoid companions Kayamba and Cha-Cha.
- Keroro, Giroro, Tamama, Kururu and Dororo appeared as playable characters in the Nexon mobile game Kemono Friends. The characters were added during a collaboration event. Like the animal characters in the game, the Keronians take the form of human girls. Enemy monsters called "Ceruleans" also appear, taking the forms of Natsumi and Keroro herself. Mine Yoshizaki, the creator of Sgt. Frog, is also the concept designer of the Kemono Friends franchise.

== Video games ==
Many of the video games were only released in Japan, but there were others released in Korea.

Game	Console	Date
Keroro Gunsō: Otoshimasu	Windows	August 17, 2004
Keroro Gunsō: MeroMero Battle Royale	PlayStation 2	September 30, 2004
Keroro Gunsō Taiketsu! Gekisō Keronprix Daisakusen de Arimasu!!	Game Boy Advance	December 9, 2004
Keroro Gunsō: MeroMero Battle Royale Z	PlayStation 2	November 17, 2005
Chō Gekijō-ban Keroro Gunsō: Enshū Dayo! Zenin Shūgō	Nintendo DS	March 16, 2006
Keroro Gunsō: Enshū Dayo! Zenin Shūgō Part 2	Nintendo DS	February 22, 2007
Mitsukete! Keroro Gunsō: Machigai Sagashi Daisakusen de Arimasu!	Nintendo DS	September 27, 2007
Chō Gekijō-ban Keroro Gunsō 3: Tenkū Daibōken de Arimasu!	Nintendo DS	February 28, 2008
Chō Gekijō-ban Keroro Gunsō: Gekishin Dragon Warriors de Arimasu!!	Nintendo DS	February 19, 2009
Keroro RPG: Kishi to Musha to Densetsu no Kaizoku	Nintendo DS	March 4, 2010

== Reception ==
In 2005, the manga received the 50th Shogakukan Manga Award for children's manga.
