= Mine Yoshizaki =

Japanese manga artist (born 1971)

- Born: December 2, 1971 (age 54); Isahaya, Nagasaki, Japan
- Occupation: Manga artist
- Notable work: Sgt. Frog
- Website: Mine Yoshizaki's Homepage

Mine Yoshizaki (吉崎 観音, Yoshizaki Mine; born December 2, 1971) is a Japanese manga creator. His most well known works are Sgt. Frog, a manga he created which later received an anime adaption, and Kemono Friends, a multimedia franchise for which Yoshizaki serves as concept designer.

== Career ==
Yoshizaki was born in Isahaya, Nagasaki. As a graduate student of Nagasaki University, he started from drawing his own dōjinshi, based on video games that were famous at that time (somewhere in the 1980s). With that dōjinshi, he practiced and improved his drawing skills day by day. Yoshizaki said that his experience in drawing dōjinshi was the most priceless experience that he ever had. According to him, making dōjinshi gave him the opportunity to seek through the world of the manga industry, with all aspects from drawing to producing (meeting with printers, editing process etc.). This allows him to do all the work, rather working in a big-scale production company that lets him work in one particular branch.

Yoshizaki later worked as an assistant to manga artist Katsu Aki. His first publication was featured in a compilation book published by Shogakukan in 1989.

He is best known for his manga Keroro Gunso, published as Sgt. Frog in the United States, which was first published in the Japanese manga magazine Shōnen Ace. He is also the creator of Arcade Gamer Fubuki and did character designs on the series Seven of Seven. In 2005, Sgt. Frog received the 50th Shogakukan Manga Award for children's manga.

Due to various Gundam references, an ongoing Sgt. Frog anime was produced by Sunrise, the original creators of the Gundam franchise. The show's main sponsor is Bandai, Sunrise's parent company, and the maker of the plastic model Gundam kits commonly seen in both the manga and anime (also known as "Gunpla" in Japan). This led to Yoshizaki collaborating on certain Gundam projects, such as designing the mascot girls Reiko Holinger and Catharine Blitzen for the Gundam Card Builder game.

He was also the designer of the Angel-XX figurine series from Neon Genesis Evangelion.

He provided character designs for the 1999 PlayStation video game Pop'n Tanks!.

He later was a character designer for the Konami Gradius-type shooter Otomedius. This is significant because, instead of simply moving a fighter craft around, the player controls a unique character bound within a vehicle.

He has also designed a playable character called Angol Fear (a nod to his character Angol Mois in Sgt. Frog – they even wield similar weapons) to the fighting game Soulcalibur IV. He also is credited as concept designer for the Kemono Friends franchise, including the anime series.

== Works ==
- 1993–1995: FANTASWEAT
- 1993–1995: Detana!! TwinBee (spin-off from the video game series Twin Bee)
- 1994–1995: 8BIT FIGHTER SHIEN
- 1995–1997: Space Juubei
- 1996–1998: VS Knight Lamune & 40 Fire (tie-in manga)
- 1998–2002: Arcade Gamer Fubuki
- 1999–present: Sgt. Frog (story and design)
- 1999: Pop'n Tanks! (character design)
- 2000–2003: Dragon Quest Monsters +
- 2005: Taisen Hot Gimmick: Axes-Jong (partial character design)
- 2007–2011: Otomedius (spin-off from the Gradius series)
- 2015: Kemono Friends (concept design)
