= List of Hamtaro characters =

A list of characters from the anime series Hamtaro. The English language names are listed before the Japanese names. The characters are also referred to in their English-language forms.

== Hamsters ==
=== Ham-Ham Gang ===
Hamtaro (ハム太郎, Hamutarō)
Voiced by: Kurumi Mamiya (Japanese), Chiara Zanni (English)
Owned by Laura, Hamtaro is a courageous Ham-Ham who's always ready to help out his friends and his owner Laura. However, he cannot stand being ignored by Laura. He is clueless about many things being that he is of an innocent nature, especially love (much to Bijou and Sparkle's dismay). Hamtaro makes the most of his life as a golden hamster (8.6cm) and lives each day in happiness hoping to make more friends and have fun. Hamtaro usually ends his sentences with "noda" (のだ) or "nanoda" (なのだ), a phrase often used by playful characters in the Japanese version. This is omitted in the English version. In both Japanese and English versions, he says such things as "Hamha!", "Heke", "Packa-packa" ("kaji-kaji"), and "kushi-kushi".
Bijou (リボンちゃん, Ribon-chan)
Voiced by: Kazusa Murai (Japanese), Chantal Strand (English)
Owned by Maria. She is a somewhat foreign hamster who loves her blue ribbons, but she is not above getting dirty when she needs to help her friends, and has been known to be generous and helpful. She used to live in France before moving to where she is now, but she feels attached to Japan and has even refused to go back to France. In the Japanese version, she speaks normal Japanese and adds the words "dechuwa" (でちゅわ) (most likely a hamster version of "desu wa") at the end of her sentences, while the English version of Bijou has a French accent. The name "Bijou," is French for "small, exquisitely wrought trinket", or it can also mean "jewel". She has a huge crush on Hamtaro (this is proven in the first episode, when she winked at him after their dancing performance) and is always touched by Boss's affection towards her.
Oxnard (こうしくん, Koushi-kun)
Voiced by: Rikako Aikawa (Japanese), Saffron Henderson (English)
Owned by Kana. Oxnard is Hamtaro's best friend in the series and the first Ham-Ham he meets. Oxnard is a bit clumsy at times and has a love for delicious food, especially sunflower seeds (of which he always carries one around). He breaks down in tears when he loses the sunflower seed he carries around. He looks up to Boss and often tries to train with him whenever possible, wanting to be as strong and brave as him. He was originally an easily frightened Ham-Ham, but he has become braver and more dependable in recent episodes. Oxnard has a crush on his close childhood friend Pepper. His Japanese name translates to "calf", which is probably referring to his spotted cow-like fur and his large appetite.
Boss (タイショーくん, Taishō-kun)
Voiced by: Kentarō Itō (Japanese), Ted Cole (English)
A wild field hamster who wears a helmet and carries a shovel. The self-proclaimed leader of the Ham-Hams, Boss has a huge crush on Bijou. He often tries to look like he knows everything, only to have it backfire in his face. He has a bit of a temper, but he is very dependable, courageous, and nice, even shy at times (especially around Bijou). Because he is a field hamster, he is more familiar with nature and is more independent compared to the other Ham-Hams. He has even developed a field hamster sense that instinctively tells him what kind of weather is approaching. However, he cannot deal with the sea as he is prone to sea sickness. Near the end of Hamtaro: Ham-Ham Heartbreak, it is hinted that he has a small crush on Harmony. Later in the series, Boss develops a crush on other girl-hams, such as Gelato and Oshare.
Pashmina (マフラーちゃん, Mafurā-chan)
Voiced by: Rei Sakuma (Japanese), Tabitha St. Germain (English)
Owned by June. Considered to be a very maternal Ham-Ham, as she often takes care of Penelope and tends to Cappy. She loves the color pink and always wears her pink scarf. Dexter and Howdy often fight for her affection, but she does not seem to notice (sometimes acting like a mediator for them). She feels that she is too young for a relationship anyway. Her Japanese name translates to "scarf", while her English name is based on the word pashmina.
Penelope (ちび丸ちゃん, Chibimaru-chan)
Voiced by: Kaori Matoi (Japanese), Jocelyne Loewen (English)
Owned by Kylie. Considered the youngest of all the Ham-Hams, Penelope is usually never seen without the cover of her yellow blanket (though a few seconds in the opening theme show her blanket coming off, revealing her brown and white fur). Although she is friendly to everyone, she feels particularly attached to Pashmina. Being innocent and naive, due to her age, she gets into trouble more often than most of the other Ham-Hams. In season two, she has shown some cross-species affection for Herbert the Pig, a boy by the name of Ethan (Kylie's younger cousin), and a rabbit at Ethan's school. Unlike the other Ham-Hams, and perhaps because of her young age, Penelope can't say anything more than "Ukyu" (うきゅ) in the Japanese version, and "Ookwee" or "Ookyoo" in the English version.
Maxwell (のっぽくん, Noppo-kun)
Voiced by: Takako Honda (Japanese), Brad Swaile (English)
Owned by the eldest son of a bookstore owner (though it seems that the bookstore owner's daughter is the one who cares for him). He always carries a book with him, and is often turned to for information. He seems to know a lot about science and literature due to his love of reading. He is a little taller than the other Ham-Hams, partially due to his tall ears. He has a crush on Sandy, though it is never initiated until Hamtaro tells him about Sandy's feelings.
Sandy (トラハムちゃん, Torahamu-chan)
Voiced by: Haruna Ikezawa (Japanese), Brittney Wilson (English)
Owned by Hillary. A sporty young girl Ham-Ham who carries a ribbon, and is the twin sister of Stan. Her interest in rhythmic gymnastics have been influenced by Hillary, who is a gold medal gymnast. She has a crush on Maxwell. While in the English version it might seem that the two have confessed their affections, a Japanese episode confirms that they are not quite romantically involved yet. In the English version, she has a valley girl accent. She is also shown to be good friends with Hamtaro, as she confided in him her crush on Maxwell.
Stan (トラハムくん, Torahamu-kun)
Voiced by: Kōki Miyata (Japanese), Noel Fisher (English), Michael Coleman (English)
Owned by Noel. Sandy's twin brother, who is often caught flirting with the other girl hamsters. As a result, he can be an annoyance to the other boy Ham-Hams, especially Boss, Howdy, and Dexter. Initially, Sandy and Stan were separated, after Noel (who had a crush on Hillary) offered to take care of one of her hamsters. He is often seen shaking his maracas or riding his skateboard. Stan seems to have a crush on Flora, the nurse hamster pet of the veterinarian, Dr. Lion.
Howdy (まいどくん, Maido-kun)
Voiced by: Yū Sugimoto (Japanese), Paul Dobson (English)
Owned by Goldie. A Ham-Ham notorious for telling bad jokes, especially at inconvenient times. He speaks with a kansai dialect in the Japanese version and with an American Southern accent in the English version. He and Dexter are long-time friends but often fight with each other over the affections of Pashmina, whom they both have a crush on.
Snoozer (ねてるくん, Neteru-kun)
Voiced by: Yū Sugimoto (Japanese), Cathy Weseluck (English)
A mysterious hamster that Boss found in his hideaway (which would soon become the Clubhouse). It is unknown where he came from or how he found his way there. He is always sleeping, but often utters some helpful and wise advice when the Ham-Hams are in need of it. Through uncanny streaks of luck, any bad situations he may end up in always seem to work themselves out for him; leaving him no worse than before. In the English version, he talks with a lisp. His Japanese name is based on the word "neru" (寝る to sleep), while his English name is based on the word "snooze".
Dexter (めがねくん, Megane-kun)
Voiced by: Chihiro Suzuki (Japanese), Samuel Vincent (English)
Owned by Curtis. A refined hamster, who is quite smart. He has a crush on Pashmina, but often battles with his long-time friend, Howdy, for her affection. His Japanese name is a pun: Megane means "glasses" in reference to the tan markings of fur around his eyes that makes him look like he's wearing glasses. Coincidentally, his owner is an optometrist.
Cappy (かぶるくん, Kaburu-kun)
Voiced by: Ai Uchikawa (Japanese), Ellen Kennedy (English)
Owned by Kip and Sue. One of the younger Ham-Hams, Cappy loves hats. The two hats he most commonly wears are his green swimming cap, and the giant red saucepan that he usually hides under. While he loves his home, he does not like being spoiled, and looks up to Boss due to Boss's independence as a field hamster. Pashmina often tends to him when they are together. He has developed some sort of a rivalry with Stucky, especially when it comes to hide and seek. His Japanese name is based on the word "kaburu" (被る to wear/put something on one's head), while his English name is based on the word "cap".
Panda (パンダくん, Panda-kun)
Voiced by: Yūko Saitō (Japanese), Jillian Michaels (English)
Owned by Mimi. A Ham-Ham whose fur matches his name, he is the sweet and gentle-natured builder/carpenter of the Ham-Hams who built and repaired many things throughout the duration of the anime as well as in the game. He also designed the Ham-Ham Fun Park. Mimi's parents own and operate a wood working shop in their house, meaning Panda always has access to construction supplies.
Jingle (トンガリくん, Tongari-kun)
Voiced by: Yū Asakawa (Japanese), Terry Klassen (English)
A field hamster. Appears occasionally throughout the series (usually when someone loses something). He speaks in rhymes, which often confuse the other Ham-Hams, but they soon figure out what he means. He is clueless about many things, but tends to give wise advice. Always seen carrying his guitar. In 'Hamtaro, Please Come Home' and all other appearances afterwards, he is seen with Herbert the Pig. He has a habit of forgetting names. Whenever he appears, he usually mispronounces someone's name (Hamtaro's most of the time). Whenever he is corrected, he usually replies "You changed your name again?"
Lapis (ラピスちゃん, Rapisu-chan)
Voiced by: Saeko Chiba (Japanese)
Owned by newcomer Mindy O'Hara. She and her younger sister, Lazuli live in Jewelry House next to Maki's house. She likes jewels and sparkling objects such as diamonds. She seems to have a crush on Hamtaro.
Lazuli (ラズリーちゃん, Razuri-chan)
Voiced by: Akane Omae (Japanese)
Owned by newcomer Mindy O'Hara along with her older sister, Lapis. She likes sweets and candy as well as using various potions to create magical seeds that turns into either animals or flying clouds. She seems to have a crush on Snoozer as in Season 3 and 4, she is seen with him fairly often.

=== Hamuhaa no Ki no Jūnin (Hamha Tree Inhabitants) ===
Sky Ham (そらハムくん, Sorahamu-kun)
Voiced by: Hikaru Tokita (Japanese)
He appeared in the Japanese Hamtaro game, Nazo Nazo Q. His dream is to cross the sky, hence the name Sky Ham. He once had a crush on Pashmina.
Okini (オーキニーちゃん, Ōkinii-chan)
Voiced by: Sayaka Maeda (Japanese)
She is greedy and once tried to make money off of Sparkle. It is rumored that she has a crush on Broski.
Mystery (ミステリーちゃん, Misuteri-chan)
Voiced by: Hisayo Mochizuki (Japanese)
She predicts hamsters' futures with her magical crystal ball, usually chanting "I see it, atarinchu".
Magical (マジカルくん, Majikaru-kun)
Voiced by: Miyako Itō (Japanese)
He is Mystery's little brother and assistant. He usually goes, "pitarin, pitarin, atarinchu" in addition to Mystery's "atarinchu".

=== Otome Gang ===
Otome (おとめちゃん, Otome-chan)
Voiced by: Tōko Aoyama (Japanese)

A female hamster with very long green hair.

Lion (ライオンくん, Raion-kun)
Voiced by: Masashi Ogawa and Tetsuharu Ōta (Japanese)

A lion-maned male hamster.

Bear (くまくん, Kuma-kun)
Voiced by: Hiroko Oyamada (Japanese)

A tall male hamster who resembles a bear.

=== Djungarians ===
Leo (ライオンさん, Raion-san)
Voiced by: Miharu Iijima (Japanese), Michael Coleman (English)
Member of Team Djungle, who lives at Djunglebell Island. He wears a lion costume.
Stripes (ゼブラさん, Zebura-san)
Voiced by: Makoto Tsumura (Japanese), Sharon Alexander (English)
Member of Team Djungle, who lives at Djunglebell Island. He wears a zebra costume.
Bunny (ウサギさん, Usagi-san)
Voiced by: Kimiko Koyama (Japanese), Annette Ducharme (English)
Member of Team Djungle. As her name implies, she wears a rabbit costume. She always says "hop" in every sentence and lives at Djunglebell Island. Appears in Hamtaro: Ham-Ham Games.
Warts (カエルさん, Kaeru-san)
Voiced by: Lee Tockar (English)
Member of Team Djungle. Primarily wears a frog outfit, but often changes and lives at Djunglebell Island. When wearing a frog costume, he makes the sound of a frog.
Cactus Brothers (サボテンブラザース, Saboten Burazāsu)
Voiced by: Sayaka Narita, Emiri Katō and Keiko Nemoto (Japanese)
Fox (キツネさん, Kitsune-san)
Voiced by: Daisuke Sakaguchi (Japanese)
Raccoon Dog (タヌキさん, Tanuki-san)
Voiced by: Chie Kōjiro (Japanese)
Treasure Box (宝箱くん, Takaraba-kun)
Octopus (タコさん, Tako-san)
Voiced by: Chigusa Ikeda (Japanese)
Dolphin (イルカさん, Iruka-san)
Voiced by: Hitomi Nabatame (Japanese)
Pheasant (キジくん, Kiji-kun)
Voiced by: Runa Akiyama (Japanese)

=== Rainbow Country Hamsters ===
Prince Bo (にじハムくん, Nijihamu-kun)
Voiced by: Hiroko Taguchi (Japanese), Rebecca Shoichet (English)
Prince of Rainbow Country. Appears in Hamtaro: Ham-Ham Games and Hamtaro: Rainbow Rescue.

==== Rainbow Girls ====
The Rainbow Girls (レインボーガールズ, Reinbō Gāruzu) are three cheerleaders who serve royalty to Rainbow Country; The Rainbow Girls are Prince Bo's palace fans. They appear in Hamtaro: Ham-Ham Games. They were jealous that the Ham-Hams got to carry the everlasting torch, so they pursued them to steal it. They grow butterfly wings when they fly.

Rosy (ビューティー, Byūtī; Beauty)
Voiced by: Shōko Kikuchi (Japanese), Alexandra Carter (English)
Rosy's signature color is red, and she is lazy and thinks the Ham-Hams are nice. Sometimes she likes to be tough.
Ivy (キューティー, Kyūtī; Cutie)
Voiced by: Masumi Asano (Japanese), Kelly Sheridan (English)
Ivy's signature color is green, and she is cute.
Daisy (プリティー, Puritī; Pretty)
Voiced by: Haruhi Terada (Japanese), Kelly Sheridan (English)
Daisy is the leader of the Rainbow Girls and her signature color is yellow.

=== Other Hamsters ===
Elder Ham (長老ハム, Chōrōhamu)
Voiced by: Takkō Ishimori (Japanese), Don Brown (English)
A narcoleptic elderly hamster, he is always falling asleep while talking. Despite this, he is a source of wisdom for the Ham-Hams.
Auntie Viv (おハムばあさん, Ohamubaa-san)
Voiced by: Masako Nozawa (Japanese), Pam Hyatt (English)
Extremely fit elderly hamster with an attitude. Used to be involved with Elder Ham.
Omar (オアシスくん, Oashisu-kun; Oasis-kun)
Voiced by: Hiromi Ishikawa (Japanese), Cathy Weseluck (English)
A hamster from a far-away land who looks exactly like Snoozer. Left his wealthy owner, a king, to travel the world.
Sabu (サブさん, Sabu-san)
Voiced by: Tomohiro Nishimura (Japanese), Richard Ian Cox (English)
Hamster with a pigeon named Françoise. He appears in the series from time to time with different roles. Mainly, he's a seed vendor who feeds anyone he sees. At one point, Boss considered him more of a man than he was.
Pepper (じゃじゃハムちゃん, Jyajyahamu-chan; Jajahamu)
Voiced by: Motoko Kumai (Japanese), Nicole Oliver (English)
Pepper is the girlfriend of Oxnard. She is the pet hamster of Kana's cousin, Dylan, who lives in the country. Compared to Oxnard, she is a lot braver and can be very rough. She ends up marrying Oxnard in the final episode.
Sparkle (くるりんちゃん, Kururin-chan)
Voiced by: Masako Jō (Japanese), Jocelyn Loewen (English)
Owned by Glitter. Sparkle is a spoiled pop star hamster. She did not like the Ham-Hams at first, but she gradually became very attached to them. In the Japanese episodes, Sparkle began to fall in love with Hamtaro, and has since then been trying to get him to notice her. For this and many other reasons, she sees Bijou and Oshare as rivals.
Stucky (ぬけないくん, Nukenai-kun)
Voiced by: Fujiko Takimoto (Japanese), Jillian Michaels (English)
A brown hamster who is the best hide and seeker like his best friend, Cappy. Stucky is "stuck" in a plastic pipe, so he can only move by running or rolling. His pipe resembles a warp pipe from the Mario series both in shape and color.
Robo-Joe (メカージロウ, Mekaa Jirō; Mecha Jirō)
Created by Laura's Grandpa, Robo-Joe is a robot hamster whose appearance seems to be based on Hamtaro. Robo-Joe's main function is the ability to learn and mimic what he hears; both human language and Ham-Ham language. In a later Japanese episode, Laura's Grandfather places a slightly modified Robo-Joe in a Battlebots-like tournament.
Nin-Ham (ニンハムくん, Ninhamu-kun)
Voiced by: Chie Kōjiro (Japanese), Seren Pendleton-Knoll (English)
A Ninja hamster who comes from IgaIga valley. Being the worst ninja in his home, he left so he could be appreciated by non-ninja Hams.
Hannah (ハナちゃん, Hana-chan)
Voiced by: Hanako Yamada (Japanese), Caroline Chan (English)
Childhood friend of Howdy. A southern belle who develops a short-lived crush on Dexter. She is one of the very few who can stand Howdy's jokes.
Chef Ham (コックさん, Kokku-san; Cook-san)
Voiced by: Toshihiko Seki (Japanese), Paul Dobson (English)
A chef hamster with a colorful Italian accent and many children.
Flora (ナースちゃん, Naasu-chan; Nurse-chan)
Voiced by: Haruhi Terada (Japanese)
A nurse hamster who is willing to cure any hamster she sees, and is very concerned about the health of her patients, even animals other than hamsters. Stan has a crush on her.
Harmony (エンジェルちゃん, Enjeru-chan; Angel-chan)
Voiced by: Yūko Kaida (Japanese)
A white hamster in an angel costume who fights with Spat and tries to save love for all hamsters. She was a major character in Hamtaro: Ham-Ham Heartbreak.
Spat (デビハムくん, Debihamu-kun; Devi-hamu-kun)
Voiced by: Keiko Yamamoto (Japanese)
A gray hamster in a devil costume who fights with Harmony and tries to ruin love for all hamsters. He made an appearance in Hamtaro: Ham-Ham Heartbreak (video game) as the main villain. In the Japanese version, Spat appears from time to time with different evil plots. Just as in Ham-Ham Heartbreak, the Ham-Hams always thwart his plans.
Barrette (ポニーテールちゃん, Ponītēru-chan; Ponytail-chan)
Voiced by: Chiemi Chiba (Japanese)
Runs the photo studio in the Ham-Ham Clubhouse with her boyfriend Seamore. She makes an appearance in Hamtaro: Ham-Ham Heartbreak. In the TV series it is rumored that she has a crush on Hamtaro.
Ook-Ook (ウキハムくん, Ukihamu-kun)
Voiced by: Rie Kugimiya (Japanese)
A hamster who wears a monkey costume. He makes an appearance in 'Hamtaro: Rainbow Rescue', and appears in some of the Japanese episodes.
Buster (たいほくん, Taiho-kun)
Voiced by: Wasabi Mizuta (Japanese)
Made an appearance in Rainbow Rescue. But in the Japanese series he appears in some episodes. He is a police/security Ham-Ham, and is usually chasing Ook-Ook.
Seamore (カメハムくん, Kamehamu-kun)
Voiced by: Yūji Ueda (Japanese)
Hamster with a turtle shell on his back (hence his Japanese name); can swim (unlike most hamsters). Seamore appears in Hamtaro: Ham-Ham Heartbreak(video game), and Hamtaro: Rainbow Rescue. He also runs a photo studio in the Ham-Ham Clubhouse with his girlfriend, Barrette.
Hambini (or Little Hams) (ちびちゃんず, Chibi-chanzu; Chibi-chans)
Young triplet hamsters who are owned by a nice lady whose name is unknown. Flora and the Ham-Hams take care of them sometimes. (Not to be confused with Chef-Ham's hambini).
Tomy-T (トマトくん, Tomato-kun)
Voiced by: Rie Kugimiya (Japanese)
He makes an appearance in Hamtaro: Rainbow Rescue. He is a gardener along with Eggy-P.
Eggy-P (ナッスーくん, Nassū-kun)
Voiced by: Yayoi Kuroda (Japanese)
He makes an appearance in Hamtaro: Rainbow Rescue. He is a gardener along with Tomy-T.
Marron (ちびくりちゃん, Chibikuri-chan)
Voiced by: Kumiko Higa (Japanese)
She makes an appearance in Hamtaro: Rainbow Rescue. A young Ham-Ham who likes chestnuts and is friends with Tomy-T and Eggy-P. She also seems to have a friendship with Penelope.
Tater (ポテトくん, Poteto-kun; Potato-kun)
Voiced by: Takayuki Yamaguchi (Japanese)
It is proven that he has a crush on Malta.
Malta (シェイクちゃん, Sheiku-chan; Shake-chan)
Voiced by: Noriko Shitaya (Japanese)
It is proven that she has a crush on Tater.
Solara (ひまわりちゃん, Himawari-chan; Sunflower-chan)
Voiced by: Yumiko Kobayashi (Japanese)
She makes an appearance in Hamtaro: Rainbow Rescue.
Oshare (おしゃれちゃん, Oshare-chan)
Voiced by: Ikue Ōtani and Naoko Matsui (Japanese)
She, like Bijou, came from France. Boss once had a crush on her, but she developed a crush on Hamtaro. This, of course, gets her in trouble with both Bijou and Sparkle.
Radar (みみよりくん, Mimiyori-kun)
Voiced by: Romi Park (Japanese)
News reporter hamster. He appeared in Hamtaro: Ham-Ham Heartbreak and Hamtaro: Rainbow Rescue. In the Japanese series, he is a prince who marries princess Championi.
Championi (きのこちゃん, Kinoko-chan)
Voiced by: Satomi Arai (Japanese)
She appears in Hamtaro: Rainbow Rescue. In the Japanese version, she is a princess who marries prince Radar. The name Championi is a play on the Spanish word for mushroom "champiñón."
King of the Sunflower Kingdom (ひまわり王国の王様, Himawari Ōkoku no Ōsama)
Voiced by: Kenichi Ogata (Japanese)
Sunflower Princess (ひまわり姫, Himawari-hime)
Voiced by: Satsuki Yukino (Japanese)
Hanamaru (花丸, Hanamaru)
Voiced by: Takuma Suzuki (Japanese)
Drizzle (くろハムくん, Kurohamu-kun)
Voiced by: Yoshiko Kamei (Japanese)
News reporter hamster. He appears in Hamtaro: Ham-Ham Heartbreak. In the game, he is a newspaper editor who works along with Radar.
Gelato (ジェラードちゃん, Jeraado-chan)
Voiced by: Sawa Ishige (Japanese)
She is a colorful hamster with one pink ear and one green ear with an orange body and white head who belongs to an ice cream vendor. Boss has a crush on her.
Broski (サーファーくん, Saafaa-kun; Surfer-kun)
Voiced by: Kahoru Sasajima (Japanese)
Surfing hamster. He appears in Hamtaro: Ham-Ham Heartbreak (video game) and "Hamtaro: Rainbow Rescue". He pretends to be a surfer, but he really can't surf, and this gets him in trouble It is rumored that he has a crush on Malta. Okini once had a crush on him.
Ice (アイスくん, Aisu-kun; Ice-kun)
Voiced by: Junko Takeuchi (Japanese)
He makes an appearance in Hamtaro: Rainbow Rescue. He is an ice cream vendor along with his sister Lolly.
Lolly (キャンディーちゃん, Kyandii-chan; Candy-chan)
Voiced by: Yuri Shiratori (Japanese)
She makes an appearance in Hamtaro: Rainbow Rescue. She is an ice cream vendor along with her brother Ice.
Mole (or Digger) (もぐるくん, Moguru-kun)
Voiced by: Kumiko Watanabe (Japanese)
He is a hamster who likes to dig all over the world.
Nande (なんでくん, Nande-kun)
Voiced by: Junko Ueda (Japanese)
He makes an appearance in the Japanese Hamtaro game Nazo Nazo Q. He is constantly asking "Why?" about everything.
Tux (ペンハムくん, Penhamu-kun)
Voiced by: Chigusa Ikeda (Japanese)
He makes an appearance in Hamtaro: Rainbow Rescue. He is the grandson of Salia
Salia (あざらしちゃん, Azarashi-chan)
Voiced by: Akiko Takeguchi (Japanese)
She makes an appearance in Hamtaro: Rainbow Rescue. She is Tux's grandmother.

== Human characters and other animals ==
=== Haruna Family ===
Laura Haruna (春名 ヒロ子, Haruna Hiroko; Hiroko Haruna)
Voiced by: Haruna Ikezawa (Japanese), Moneca Stori (English)
Hamtaro's owner and the main human character. Also known as Roko-chan. Laura cares for Hamtaro very much, just as Hamtaro cares for her. Several episodes involve the Ham-Hams trying to help Laura with whatever problem she is facing. She is best friends with Kana, and has a huge crush on her friend Travis. She is one of the two human characters who can actually talk to the Ham-Hams and is in the 5th grade.
Marian Haruna (春名 ヒロミ, Haruna Hiromi; Hiromi Haruna)
Voiced by: Rei Sakuma (Japanese), Cathy Weseluck (English)
Laura's mother, and Forrest's wife.
Forrest Haruna (春名 ユメ太郎, Haruna Yumetarō; Yumetarō Haruna)
Voiced by: Hiroshi Isobe (Japanese), Samuel Vincent (English)
Laura's father. He and Kana's father, Conrad, tend to become competitive with one another.
Brandy (どんちゃん, Don-chan)
Voiced by: Rikako Aikawa (Japanese), Don Brown (English)
Laura's pet brown dog. His real name is Brandon (ブランドン, Burandon). Brandy rarely does anything except yawn, but he has been considered a great friend to the Ham-Hams (He saved Boss and Bijou from drowning in episode 56 Boss, the Cool Ham of the Sea! and the Ham-Hams made him his own scarf in episode 72 The Knitting Craze.) In many of the dreams that the Ham-Hams have, Hamtaro rides Brandy. In several of those cases, he can fly. In one episode, he was even able to talk, due to Lazuli giving him a magical cookie that could make dogs talk.
Woody Haruna
Voiced by: Hiroshi Ito (Japanese), Richard Newman (English)
Laura's grandfather, an inventor.
Willow Haruna (春名 ユメ, Haruna Yume; Yume Haruna)
Voiced by: Masako Nozawa (Japanese), Kathy Morse (English)
Laura's grandmother.
Emiko Haruna
Laura's cousin who first appeared in "Stucky Falls In Love!", who invited her and her mother to her house to see her wear her wedding dress and make a floral bouquet. She owns a gray Persian cat named Lucy. Emiko mentions to Laura that after she gets married, she will move far away from her home.

=== Iwata Family ===
Kana Iwata (岩田 カナ, Iwata Kana)
Voiced by: Ai Uchikawa (Japanese), Daniella Evangelista (English)
Oxnard's owner. Kana met Laura the day Laura moved in and they have become friends since then. She is also a very talented artist.
Conrad Iwata
Voiced by: Kentarō Itō (Japanese) Trevor Devall (English)
Kana's father. He and Laura's dad, Forrest, tend to be competitive with each other.
Cindy Iwata
Voiced by: Ellen Kennedy (English)
Kana's mom and Conrad's wife.
Mimi Iwata (岩田 モモ, Iwata Momo; Momo Iwata)
Voiced by: Yūko Sasamoto (Japanese), Brenna O'Brien (English)
Panda's owner and Kana's second cousin twice removed. A kindergarten-grade student and one of the two human characters who can actually talk to the Ham-Hams. She is a patient and understanding girl, but tends to feel lonely at home.
Jack Iwata (岩田 竹蔵, Iwata Takezō; Takezō Iwata)
Voiced by: Jūrōta Kosugi (Japanese), Paul Dobson (English)
Mimi's father. He cares about Mimi and knows that she is lonely at home, but is not able to spend as much time with her as he likes.
Mac Iwata (岩田 まつお, Iwata Matsuo; Matsuo Iwata)
Voiced by: Rikako Aikawa (Japanese), Matt Smith and Seren Pendleton-Knoll (English)
One of Mimi's two older brothers.
Josh Iwata (岩田 きくお, Iwata Kikuo; Kikuo Iwata)
Voiced by: Kaori Matoi (Japanese), Cathy Weseluck (English)
One of Mimi's two older brothers.
Tina Iwata (岩田 ヒナ, Iwata Hina; Hina Iwata)
Mimi's baby sister. On the day of Mimi's birthday, Tina is born.
Dylan (ダイスケ, Daisuke; Daisuke)
Voiced by: Ryōtarō Okiayu (Japanese), Michael Dobson (English)
Kana's cousin who lives in the Flower Ranch with his hamster Pepper.

=== O'Hara Family ===
Mindy O'Hara (大原 マキ, Ōhara Maki; Maki Ōhara)
Voiced by: Fumiko Orikasa (Japanese)
Lapis and Lazuli's owner who lives with her grandpa at an animal ranch. She is an American transfer student. She also has a pet bear cub named Kumajiro (Kuma means bear).

Kazuya O'Hara (大原 カズヤ, Ōhara Kazuya; Kazuya Ōhara)
Voiced by: Yukimasa Obi (Japanese)
Mindy's older brother and Kana's crush.

Mindy's Grandfather (マキちゃんのおじいちゃん, Maki-chan no Ojii-chan)
Voiced by: Junpei Takiguchi (Japanese)

Kumajirō (クマ次郎, Kumajirō)
Voiced by: Yoshimitsu Shimoyama (Japanese)
Mindy's pet bear cub.

=== Other characters ===
June (ジュン, Jun)
Voiced by: Kaori Matoi (Japanese), Jocelyn Loewen (English)
Pashmina's owner. Best friends with Kylie. She hates Glitter a lot because of her attitude.
Kylie (キョウコ, Kyōko)
Voiced by: Tomoko Ishimura (Japanese), Lanie McAuley and Saffron Henderson (English)
Penelope's owner. Best friends with June.
Travis Tyler (木村 太一, Kimura Taichi; Taichi Kimura)
Voiced by: Yū Asakawa (Japanese), Matt Smith (English)
Laura's friend and the school's best soccer player. Laura has a huge crush on him and it is shown later that he seemingly returns her feelings, although it's never made clear. He moves away at the end of the series, leaving Laura somewhat heartbroken.
Maria (マリア, Maria)
Voiced by: Megumi Toyoguchi (Japanese), Brittney Wilson (English)
The owner of Bijou. Maria is a talented pianist. She and Laura only became friends in season 2 (they never meet in season 1).
Katrinne (カトリーヌ, Katorīnu)
Voiced by: Kaori Matoi (Japanese)
Oshare-chan's owner and Maria's friend.
Glitter Curi (栗原 くるみ, Kurihara Kurumi; Kurumi Kurihara)
Voiced by: Chinami Nishimura and Tomoe Hanba (Japanese), Kelly Sheridan (English)
The owner of Sparkle. A spoiled and arrogant pop star who is used to always getting her way. She falls head-over-heels in love with Travis who is friends with Laura, and desperate tries to win his heart, but always fails considering he doesn't like her at all. Because of this, Glitter has a bitter rivalry with Laura. However, like her hamster, Sparkle, Glitter's spoiled attitude gradually changes, and she becomes more humble, even forming a friendship with Laura later in the series.
Roberto Arvelo (ロベルト高城, Roberuto Takagi; Roberto Takagi)
Voiced by: Sachi Matsumoto (Japanese), Matt Hill (English)
He becomes Laura's classmate in season 2. Roberto is a very arrogant but talented soccer player on the school soccer team. He often argues with Travis and Laura, but deep down, Roberto is really a kind boy who is often misunderstood. He is also an animal lover, and is fond of Laura's dog Brandy. He has an Akita puppy named Samba who debuted in episode 98, "Who Stole My Shoe?" It is implied that he has a crush on Laura, although she never notices this and never seems to be interested in him. Roberto is half-Japanese and half-Brazilian in the original version.
Mia
Voiced by: Chantal Strand (English)
Laura and Kana's classmate, who owns the kitten of which Boss and the rest of the Ham-Hams took care.
Melanie Foster
Voiced by: Chiara Zanni (English)
Laura's old friend and former neighbor when she and her family previously lived in an apartment.
Hillary (ヒカリ, Hikari)
Voiced by: Yūko Katō (Japanese), Kelly Sheridan (English)
Sandy's owner. A very athletic girl who has won several gold medals in gymnastics. Her athleticism has inspired Sandy's own athletic efforts.
Noel (ノリオ, Norio)
Voiced by: Nobuyuki Hiyama (Japanese), Kirby Morrow (English)
Stan's owner. Has a crush on Hillary, but unfortunately is very shy, the opposite of Stan.
Goldie Houston (浪花 都, Namihana Miyako; Miyako Namihana)
Voiced by: Kaoru Morota (Japanese), Saffron Henderson (English)
Howdy's owner and the refined shopkeep of the "Namihana Shop". She is a fan of the Hanshin Tigers and commemorates each of their victories by holding a sale at her shop. She was a lover of Curtis during her student days. She is skilled at baseball.
Zack Houston (浪花 サダ吉, Namihana Sadakichi; Sadakichi Namihana)
Voiced by: Chiyako Shibahara (Japanese), Jillian Michaels (English)
Goldie's son and a classmate of Yume-chan. Like his mother, he is a fan of the Hanshin Tigers. He longs to see Curtis again.
Curtis Milan (丈二, Jōji)
Voiced by: Kazuhiro Yamaji (Japanese), Ted Cole (English)
Dexter's owner. He manages a glasses/Italian shop named "Rare Glasses". He is a rash man who tends to put on airs. He was a lover of Goldie during his school days. He drives a Fiat Panda.
Sue (サエ, Sae) and Kip (ユウ, Yū)
Voiced by: Hyōsei and Tokuyoshi Kawashima (Japanese), Nicole Oliver and Richard Ian Cox (English)
Cappy's owners who run a craft store. They love Cappy like their own child, and constantly spoil him.
Dr. Lion (ライオン先生, Raion-sensei)
Voiced by: Masashi Ebara (Japanese)
Flora's owner and a famous veterinarian.
Yume (ユメ, Yume)
Voiced by: Taeko Kawata (Japanese)
Maxwell's owner and a classmate of Goldie. She is the daughter of a bookstore owner.
Philip Yoshi (山田一郎, Yamada Ichirō; Ichirō Yamada)
Voiced by: Chihiro Suzuki (Japanese), Scott McNeil (English)
Laura's teacher. A young and enthusiastic teacher, who is very good at his job. Outside of his job, he is more wimpy and has a morbid fear of chickens. However, he has conquered his fear several times to win the heart of Charlotte Rooster. He is now married to her, and they even have a child (in the Japanese version), whom the Ham-Hams often try to protect.
Charlotte Rooster (稲鳥 サクラ, Inatori Sakura; Sakura Inatori)
Voiced by: Fumiko Orikasa (Japanese), Venus Terzo (English)
Philip Yoshi's girlfriend who later becomes his wife. She is the daughter of Chairman Rooster, who is very strict. They have one child.
Yamato Rooster (稲鳥 大和, Inatori Yamato; Yamato Inatori)
Voiced by: Kaori Tsuji (Japanese)
The infant son of Philip and Charlotte Rooster.
Chairman Rooster (稲鳥会長, Inatori-kaichō; Chairman Inatori)
Voiced by: Kiyoshi Kawakubo (Japanese), Scott McNeil (English)
The father of Charlotte Rooster and father-in-law of Philip. He is very strict and traditional, believing that Mr. Yoshi is not good enough for Charlotte. When Mr. Yoshi proves his devotion to Charlotte by going to find her on their wedding day, Chairman Rooster finally relents and accepts Mr. Yoshi.
Butler (執事, Shitsuji)
Voiced by: Toshitaka Hirano (Japanese), Ted Cole (English)
The butler of the Rooster family.
Yamaguchi (山口)
Voiced by: Kaori Matoi (Japanese)
A classmate of Laura who plans on joining the soccer club. He is named after Tokio member Tatsuya Yamaguchi.
Matsuoka (松岡)
Voiced by: Miharu Iijima (Japanese)
A soccer club member and classmate of Laura. He is named after Tokio member Masahiro Matsuoka.
Nagase (長瀬)
Voiced by: Keiko Nemoto (Japanese)
A soccer club member and classmate of Laura. He is named after Tokio member Tomoya Nagase.
Samba (サンバ, Sanba)
Voiced by: Rei Sakuma (Japanese)
Roberto's Akita puppy who was given to him by his uncle.
Emi (絵美, Emi)
Voiced by: Miwa Kōzuki (Japanese)
Solara's owner. Her house is surrounded by sunflowers.
Yukio (幸夫, Yukio)
Voiced by: Hiroshi Tsuchida (Japanese)
Emi-chan's father. He is the organizer of the Sunflower Festival.
Sachiko (佐知子, Sachiko)
Voiced by: Izumi Kikuchi (Japanese)
Emi-chan's mother and a friend of Laura's mother.
Atsuko Mushakōji (武者小路 篤子, Mushakōji Atsuko)
Voiced by: Rio Natsuki (Japanese)
Malta's owner and the daughter of a high-class family.
Jirō (ジロー, Jirō)
Voiced by: Masaki Mimoto (Japanese)
Gelato's owner and an ice cream vendor.
Princess (リリィ, Ririi; Lilly)
Voiced by: Fuyuka Oura (Japanese)
Maria's pet Beagle.
Kaede (楓, Kaede)
Voiced by: Tomoko Miyadera (Japanese)
Yūji (裕二)
Voiced by: Tokuyoshi Kawashima (Japanese)
Mister Kaori (薫先生, Kaori-sensei)
Voiced by: Hiro Yūki (Japanese)
A knitting lecturer and Barrette's owner.
Gabriel Black (緑川先生, Midori-sensei; Mister Midori)
Voiced by: Tetsuo Gotō (Japanese)
A famous author with a liking for pranks and an intimate relationship with Laura's father.
Ethan (ユウジ, Yūji; Yūji)
Voiced by: Wakako Taniguchi (Japanese), Cathy Weseluck (English)
Mimi's boyfriend and Kylie's cousin.
Kenta (ケンタ, Kenta)
Voiced by: Keiko Nemoto (Japanese)
A boy who lives in the neighborhood of Laura's grandpa.
Jasumin (ジャスミン, Jasmin)
Voiced by:
A girl who appears in the episode "The Search for Spring!" She is the owner of a little Pomeranian puppy named Spring whom she cares about deeply.
Sweetgo (すい～ちゅゴン, Sui~chugon)
Voiced by:
A giant caterpillar who appears in the episode "Sweetgo's Surprise!", where The Ham-Hams initially spot the creature munching peacefully on the candy landscape before it turns aggressive and starts eating the candy forest and chasing them. During the attack, Sweetgo swallows several characters—including Hamtaro, Lapis, Oxnard, and Snoozer—who end up trapped inside its stomach. In the next episode, "Here I Am, Clubhouse!", it eventually turns into a butterfly.
Chibi-Chan (チビちゃん/ユニコーン・チビちゃん)
Voiced by:
A yellow candy unicorn who appears in the episode "A Mischievous Unicorn!". When Oxnard chases a candy rabbit into a flower field and meets Chibi-Chan. The baby unicorn happily jumps around and accidentally wreaks havoc on the blooming flowers.
Herbert (トン吉, Tonkichi; Tonkichi)
Voiced by: Kujira (Japanese), Samuel Vincent (English)
Jingle's pet pig. Jingle uses Herbert as his mode of transportation. Since Jingle rarely cares about where he's going or where he'll stop, he usually lets Herbert decide. However, if he sees some corn, Herbert will charge at immense speeds. He also seems to like Penelope a lot.
The Chicky-Chicky Gang (Poyi-Poyi)
Voiced by:
An evil group of five villainous ill-tempered baby chicks owned by Charlotte, they will relentlessly attack the Ham-Hams if given the chance. The leader is a baby chick with a scar on his forehead and an eye patch.
Françoise (どんちゃ, Doncha)
Voiced by: Don Brown (English)
A pigeon which is both Sabu's friend and "girlfriend". She often is transportation for Hamtaro.
Bakasu (チョビ, Chobi)
Voiced by:
A Great Dane, sometimes referred to as Bakasu, is a guard dog who belongs to Malta's owner, Atsuko Mushakōji.
Turtly (カメゾウ, Kamezou)
Voiced by:
A large green turtle that Omar rides on his many world travels. He is also friends with Snoozer.
Miss Rabbit
Voiced by:
A white rabbit who appears in "Brandy's Big Race," where she becomes trapped and stranded in an icy river, until the Ham-Hams find her, and is rescued by Brandy.
Lucy
Voiced by:
Lucy is a gray Persian cat who is the pet of Laura Haruna's cousin Emiko.
Kitty
Voiced by:
An orange tabby kitten who appears in "Boss is a Mom!," where Boss finds him bruised and hungry when he gets lost from his owner, Mia, and the other Ham-Hams watch over and care for him nervously until he is tracked down and returned to her.
Mother Cat
Voiced by:
A Maltese cat who appears in "Bijou's in Danger!," where she watches her 4 kittens in shopping district alley when Bijou gets lost and faints near her 4 kittens, Mother Cat mistakes her for one of her own and acts fiercely protective. As Hamtaro, Boss, and the other Ham-Hams try to rescue Bijou, Mother Cat gets distracted when Laura and Kana arrive and fawn over the kittens, letting the hamsters slip away
The three crow ladies
Voiced by:
Ran is the leader of the three crow ladies.

== Film characters ==
=== General ===
DJ Ham (DJハム, DJ Hamu)
Voiced by: Banana Ice
A DJ hamster with dreadlocks who appears in all four of the Hamtaro movies. Never seen outside of Asia except in the Italian and Finnish dubs.
Mini Hams (ミニハムず, Minihamuzu)
A group of hamster pop stars who appear in the first three Hamtaro movies. Their designs are based off the J-POP group Mini-Moni, even being voiced by each of the group's members.

=== Movie 1 – Hamtaro: Adventures in Ham-Ham Land (2001) ===
Fairy Ham (Tinkle) (妖精ハム（ティンクル）, Yōsei Hamu (Tinkuru))
Voiced by: Kotono Mitsuishi (Japanese)
A fairy who watches over Ham-Ham Land.
Devil King Ham (Ryū Hamuyama) (魔王ハム（ハム山リュウ）, Maō Ham (Hamuyama Ryū))
Voiced by: Kenyū Horiuchi (Japanese)
The main antagonist of the first film. A self-proclaimed devil king and nightkeeper of Ham-Ham Land. He has the ability to transform into a giant dragon.
Ninja Hams (にんじゃハムず, Ninja Hamuzu)
The little and loyal henchman of Devil King Ham.

=== Movie 2 – Hamtaro: The Captive Princess (2002) ===
Princess Cye-Ra (シェーラ姫, Shēra Hime)
Voiced by: Sakiko Tamagawa (Japanese)
The princess who rules the Hamja Kingdom alongside her father King Hamja. Hamtaro falls in love with her.
Prince Hamha (ハムーハ王子, Hamūha ōji)
Voiced by: Takahiro Sakurai (Japanese)
Cye-Ra's romantic partner and the prince of the Hamja Kingdom. He was transformed into a giant ram known as MeeMee, had his memories wiped away, and was locked away in Sabaku-Nya's tower.
Sabaku-Nya (サバクーニャ, Sabakūnya)
Voiced by: Yoshito Yasuhara (Japanese)
The main antagonist of the second film. An evil magician cat who was released from the vase he was sealed in many years ago by Prince Hamja. He tries to marry Princess Cye-Ra in order to take over the Hamja Kingdom.
King Hamja (ハムージャ王, Hamūjya-ō)
Voiced by: Masaru Ikeda (Japanese)
The king of the Hamja Kingdom who rules alongside his daughter Princess Cye-Ra.

=== Movie 3 – Hamtaro: Miracle in Aurora Valley (2003) ===
Crystal (プリンちゃん, Purin-chan)
Voiced by: Natsumi Abe (Japanese), Loretta Di Pisa (Italian)
A snow fairy hamster who takes Bijou to Aurora Village because she believes her to be the destined Snow Princess. She can also transform into a fairy-like human form.
Captain Hamstern (ハムクック, Hamukukku)
Voiced by: Akio Ōtsuka (Japanese), Andrea Bolognini (Italian)
The main antagonist of the third film. He kidnaps Bijou in order to prevent her from returning the snow to the Snow Hams and challenges Hamtaro to a race against him in the Grand Prix.

=== Movie 4 – Hamtaro: Fairy Tale (2004) ===
Ayayamu (あややム, Ayayamu)
Voiced by Aya Matsuura (Japanese)
The main antagonist of the fourth film. An author of many books who lives inside a giant library alongside her assistants Shige Ham and Rika Ham.
