= Kazusa Murai =

Japanese voice actress (born 1975)

- 村井 かずさ
- Born: Kazusa Murai (村井 毎早); December 28, 1975 (age 50); Nagoya, Aichi, Japan
- Occupations: Voice actress; narrator
- Years active: 1996–present
- Agent: Haikyō
- Website: Official profile

Kazusa Murai (村井 かずさ, Murai Kazusa; born December 28, 1975 in Nagoya, Aichi Prefecture, Japan) is a Japanese voice actress and narrator affiliated with Haikyō.

She is most well known for her voice roles in anime such as Ribon-chan in Trotting Hamtaro, Kazumi Takiura in Devil Lady, Nemu in Haibane Renmei, Saburō and Yamane in Mirmo!, Midori Hinamori in Shugo Chara! and Maria Shibata in Angelic Layer.

== Filmography ==
=== Anime ===
- Angelic Layer (Maria Shibata)
- Black Rock Shooter (Mato's Mother)
- Boys Be... (Chiharu Nitta)
- Devil Lady (Kazumi Takiura)
- Digimon Adventure 02 (Jun Motomiya)
- Full Metal Panic! (Dana)
- Ginban Kaleidoscope (Kyōko Shitō)
- Haibane Renmei (Nemu)
- Healin' Good Pretty Cure (Yasuko Hanadera)
- Kamichama Karin (Miyon Yi)
- Magical Play (MyuMyu)
- Magic User's Club (Saki Sawanoguchi)
- Mirmo! (Saburo, Yamane, Chai)
- Phi Brain: Puzzle of God (Shizuka Daimon)
- Pokémon (Marina)
- Puni Puni Poemy (Shii Aasu)
- Shugo Chara! (Midori Hinamori)
- Shugo Chara!! Doki- (Midori Hinamori, Kiran)
- Speed Racer X (Mai Kazami)
- Trotting Hamtaro (Ribon-chan)
- Zegapain (Isola)

=== Video games ===
- Tokimeki Memorial 2 (Kaori Yae)

=== Dubbing ===
==== Live-action ====
- Confessions of a Dangerous Mind (Debbie (Maggie Gyllenhaal))
- From Vegas to Macau (Rainbow (Kimmy Tong))
- The Legend of Zu (Dawn / Enigman (Cecilia Cheung))
- Tom-Yum-Goong (Pla (Bongkoj Khongmalai))
- Valentine (Shelley Fisher (Katherine Heigl))

==== Animation ====
- Totally Spies! (Clover)
- Transformers: Prime (Airachind)
