= Haruna Ikezawa =

Japanese actress (born 1975)

- 池澤 春菜
- Born: December 15, 1975 (age 50); Athens, Greece
- Occupations: Actress; voice actress; singer
- Years active: 1994–present
- Agent: Across Entertainment
- Father: Natsuki Ikezawa

Haruna Ikezawa (池澤 春菜, Ikezawa Haruna; born December 15, 1975) is a Greek-born Japanese actress, voice actress, singer and author.

Her major voice acting roles in anime include Gō Seiba in Bakusō Kyōdai Let's & Go!!, Haruna Hiroko in Trotting Hamtaro, Yoshino Shimazu in Maria-sama ga Miteru, Momoka Nishizawa in Sgt. Frog. In video games, she has voiced Athena Asamiya in The King of Fighters since 1998, and voiced Coco Bandicoot in the Crash Bandicoot series.

== Biography ==
Ikezawa was born in Athens, Greece to a Japanese father, the Akutagawa Prize-winning author Natsuki Ikezawa. Her paternal grandfather is the poet Takehiko Fukunaga. Her mother is half-Japanese and half-Greek. Her parents returned to Japan when she was around 3 years old and grew up in Yokohama, Kanagawa Prefecture. She graduated from Seijo Gakuen.

Ikezawa announced her marriage on July 1, 2020, however, the marriage was delayed due to several difficulties, including the COVID-19 pandemic. The marriage was solemnized in September 2024.

== Novels ==
In December 2020, Ikezawa released her first novel, Orbital Christmas (『オービタル・クリスマス』). In 2021, the work won the 52nd Seiun Award for Japanese Short Story.

== Filmography ==
=== Anime ===
List of voice performances in anime
| Year | Series | Role | Notes | Source |
|---|---|---|---|---|
| 1995 | Wedding Peach | Bride, female student, others | | |
| 1995 | Battle Skipper | BSX-03 Mega Diver | | |
| 1996–98 | Bakusō Kyōdai Let's & Go!! | Gō Seiba, Marina Ohgami | | |
| 1996 | Beast Wars: Transformers | Transmutate | | |
| 1997 | Haunted Junction | Hanako-chan | Ep. 3 | |
| 1997 | Virus Buster Serge | Mirei | | |
| 1997 | Kindaichi Case Files | Fumi Kindaichi | | |
| 1997 | Kyuumei Senshi Nanosaver | Jin | | |
| 1997 | Demon Fighter Kocho | Enoki Kocho | | |
| 1997 | Clamp School Detectives | Nagisa Azuya | | |
| 1997–98 | Ninpen Manmaru | Manmaru | | |
| 1997 | Hyper Speed GranDoll | Haruna | | |
| 1998 | Alice SOS | Yukari Ashikawa | | |
| 1999 | Dangaizer 3 | Mitsurugi Youna | | |
| 1999–2000 | The Big O | Lola | | |
| 1999 | Zoku Zoku Mora no Obaketachi | Guu | | |
| 1999 | Meltylancer the Animation | Nana | OVA | |
| 2000 | UFO Baby | Christine Hanakomachi | | |
| 2000–06 | Hamtaro | Hiroko Haruna, Torahamu-chan | | |
| 2000 | Hiwou War Chronicles | Hana | NHK-BS | |
| 2001 | Super GALS! | Miyu Yamazaki | | |
| 2002 | Atashin'chi | Yukarin | | |
| 2002–03 | Gravion | Runa Gusuku | | |
| 2003–04 | Case Closed | Guest characters (Kasumi Namihara, Ema Anzai) | | |
| 2003 | Zentorix 時突冒険記 ゼントリックス | | NHK-BS | |
| 2003 | Zatch Bell! | Li-en | | |
| 2004 | Maria-sama ga Miteru | Yoshino Shimazu | | |
| 2004–05 | Futari wa Pretty Cure | Porun | Also Max Heart | |
| 2004 | Sgt. Frog | Momoka Nishizawa | | |
| 2005 | Doraemon | Tsubasa Ito, Susie | | |
| 2006 | Gaiking: Legend of Daiku-Maryu | Puroisuto | | |
| 2006 | Happy Lucky Bikkuriman | Juujika Tenshi | | |
| 2007 | Jūsō Kikō Dancouga Nova | Aoi Hidaka | | |
| 2007 | KimiKiss pure rouge | Mao Mizusawa | | |
| 2008 | GeGeGe no Kitarō | Amabie | | |
| 2009 | One Piece | Keimi | | |
| 2011 | Beelzebub | Shizuka Nanami | | |
| 2012 | Daily Lives of High School Boys | Self-conscious woman | | |
| 2013 | Fantasista Doll | Rin | | |
| 2013 | Phi Brain: Puzzle of God | Regina | third season | |
| 2014 | Kenichi: Shaamu no Akiba Tanbo | Shaamu | 7th OVA | |
| 2016 | The Kubikiri Cycle | Yayoi Sashirono | OVA | |
| 2017–18 | The King of Fighters: Destiny | Athena Asamiya | ONA | |
| 2018 | Umamusume: Pretty Derby | Broye | first season | |
| 2025 | Fermat Kitchen | Nene Fukuda | | |
| | Crayon Shin-chan | Sho Matsumoto | | |

=== Anime films ===
List of voice performances in anime feature films
| Year | Series | Role | Notes | Source |
|---|---|---|---|---|
| 1997 | Bakusō Kyōdai Let's & Go!! WGP Bōsō Mini Yonku Dai Tsuiseki! | | | |
| 2001 | Hamtaro: Hamuhamu's Land Adventure とっとこハム太郎 ハムハムランド大冒険 | Hiroko Haruna, Torahamu-chan | | |
| 2002 | Gekijō-ban Tottoko Hamutarō: Hamu Hamu Hamūja! Maboroshi no Purinsesu 劇場版とっとこハム太郎 ハムハムハムージャ! 幻のプリンセス | Hiroko Haruna, Torahamu-chan | | |
| 2003 | Crayon Shin-chan: The Storm Called: Yakiniku Road of Honor | | | |
| 2003 | Atashin'chi | | | |
| 2003 | Gekijō-ban Tottoko Hamutarō Hamu-Hamu Guran Purin: Ōrora Tani no Kiseki - Ribon-chan Kiki Ippatsu! 劇場版とっとこハム太郎ハムハムグランプリン オーロラ谷の奇跡 リボンちゃん危機一髪! | Hiroko Haruna, Torahamu-chan | | |
| 2004 | Gekijō-ban Tottoko Hamutarō Hamu Hamu Paradaichu!: Hamutarō to Fushigi no Oni no Ehon-tō 劇場版とっとこハム太郎はむはむぱらだいちゅ! ハム太郎とふしぎのオニの絵本塔 | Hiroko Haruna, Torahamu-chan | | |
| 2005 | Futari wa Pretty Cure Max Heart the Movie | Porun | | |
| 2006 | Keroro Gunsō the Super Movie | Momoka Nishizawa | | |
| 2007 | Chō Gekijōban Keroro Gunsō 2: Shinkai no Princess de Arimasu! | Momoka Nishizawa | | |
| 2008 | Keroro Gunso the Super Movie 3: Keroro vs. Keroro Great Sky Duel | Momoka Nishizawa | | |
| 2009 | Keroro Gunso the Super Movie 4: Gekishin Dragon Warriors | Momoka Nishizawa | | |
| 2026 | Shin Gekijōban Keroro Gunsō: Fukkatsu Shite Sokkō Chikyū Metsubō no Kiki de Arimasu! | Momoka Nishizawa | | |

=== Live-action ===
List of voice performances in live-action shows
| Series | Role | Notes | Source |
|---|---|---|---|
| Arithmetic Sui Sui | | NHK, live-action TV voice-over | |
| Friday Anime Museum | | | |
| Hitori de Derikumon | | | |
| Kirari きらり | | | |
| News Plus 1 | Narrator | News show | |
| Tensai TV kun | | NHK, TV variety show voice-over | |

=== Video games ===
List of voice performances in video games
| Year | Series | Role | Notes | Source |
|---|---|---|---|---|
| 1995 | Fighting Vipers | | | |
| 1995 | Power Dolls 2 | Melissa Rutherford | PlayStation | |
| 1996 | True Love Story | Amano Midori | PlayStation | |
| 1996 | Melty Lancer -Ginga Shoujo Keisatu 2086- | Nana | Sega Saturn | |
| 1996 | Lunar: Silver Star Story | Jessica | | |
| 1997 | Ayakashi Ninden Kunoichiban | Ouka Shirase | PlayStation | |
| 1997 | Boys Be | Hikaru Mizuhara | PlayStation | |
| 1997 | Sparkling Feather | Coral, Opal Feather | PC FX | |
| 1997 | Voice Idol Maniacs Pool Bar Story | Haruna Ikezawa | Sega Saturn | |
| 1997 | Atelier Marie | Marlone | | |
| 1997 | B Senjou no Alice | Alice | PlayStation | |
| 1997–2000, 2017–2020 | Crash Bandicoot series | Coco Bandicoot | Japanese dub Cortex Strikes Back; Warped; Team Racing; Bash; N. Sane Trilogy; It's About Time | |
| 1997 | Magical Drop III | Lovers, Death | NeoGeo | |
| 1997 | Wizard's Harmony 2 | Rumina | PlayStation, Sega Saturn | |
| 1999 | Meltylancer the 3rd planet | Nana, others | PlayStation | |
| 1998–present | The King of Fighters series | Athena Asamiya, Foxy | since King of Fighters '98 (Athena), The King of Fighters 2001 & The King of Fighters 2002 Unlimited Match (Foxy) | |
| 1999 | L no Kisetsu | Rumine Suzushina | PlayStation | |
| 1998 | Debut 21 | Ryoko Hagiwara | PlayStation | |
| 1998 | The Star Bowling DX | | PlayStation | |
| 1998 | The Star Bowling Vol. 2 | | Sega Saturn | |
| 1998 | Doki Doki On Air | Nana | Windows, Mac, PlayStation | |
| 1998 | Bakusou Kyoudai Let's & Go!! Eternal Wings | Gou | PlayStation | |
| 1998 | Mujintou Monogatari R | Kirara Tachihara | Win | |
| 1999 | Yuukyuu Gensoukyoku 3 Perpetual Blue | Vircia Ducelle | Dreamcast | |
| 1999 | Lord of Fist | | | |
| 2000 | Memories Off 2nd | Tsubame Minami | | |
| 2000 | Yuukyuu Kumikyoku Perpetual Suite -All Star Project- | Vircia Ducelle | PlayStation | |
| 2001 | Capcom vs. SNK 2 | Athena Asamiya | GameCube, PS2, Xbox | |
| 2002 | Moeyo Ken | Kaoru Okita | | |
| 2004–05 | Zatch Bell! | Li-en | | |
| 2006–present | Dance Dance Revolution series | Emi Toshiba | starting with Dance Dance Revolution SuperNOVA | |
| 2008 | Super Robot Wars Z | Runa Gusuku | | |
| 2009 | Yu-Gi-Oh! 5D's Tag Force 4 | Tasha | | |
| 2009 | Kindaichi Case Files: Devil's Killing Navigation | Fumi Kindaichi | | |
| 2010 | Neo Geo Heroes: Ultimate Shooting | Athena Asamiya | | |
| 2011 | Tales of Xillia | Teepo | | |
| 2011 | 2nd Super Robot Wars Z: Hakai Hen | Aoi Hidaka, Runa Gusuku | | |
| 2011 | One Piece: Gigant Battle! 2 New World | Keimi | | |
| 2012 | SD Gundam Generation Over World | | | |
| 2014 | Magica Wars Zanbatsu | Amane Sakaki | | |
| 2014 | 3rd Super Robot Wars Z: Time Prison chapter | Aoi Hidaka | | |
| 2018 | SNK Heroines: Tag Team Frenzy | Athena Asamiya | | |
| 2019 | Arknights | Breeze | | |
| 2021 | Tales of Arise | Kisara | | |

=== Drama CD ===
List of voice performances in drama CDs
| Series | Role | Notes | Source |
|---|---|---|---|
| Battle Skipper | BSX-3 | | |
| Bounty Sword | Clayo | | |
| Chou Kousoku Gran Doll | Haruna | radio | |
| Dangaizer 3 | Mitsurugi Youna | | |
| Heian Mato Karakuri Kidan | Seishou Nagon, Tentarou | radio | |
| Luna Silver Story Lunatic Festa | Jessica | | |
| Marie no Atelier | Malrone | radio | |
| Minna de tsukuru Yuukyuu CD! | | | |
| Neko na Kankei | Kisugi Megumi | | |
| Suehiro Shoutengai Pre-Drama CD -Prelude- | Tsukishima Yasuko | | |
| Yuukyuu Gensoukyoku "Yuukyuu Ongakusai" | | | |
| Yuukyuu Gensoukyoku 3 Perpetual Blue | | | |
| Yuukyuu Kumikyoku All Star Project | Vircia Ducelle | | |

=== Other dubbing ===
List of dub performances in overseas shows and films
| Series | Role | Notes | Source |
|---|---|---|---|
| The Borrowers | | | |
| Earthquake Bird | Lucy Fly | Dubbing for Alicia Vikander | |
| The Good Doctor | Dr. Morgan Reznick | Dubbing for Fiona Gubelmann | |
| Home Alone | Megan McCallister | | |
| Home Alone 2 | Megan McCallister | | |
| Malice | Cici | | |
| Ocean Girl オーシャン・ガール | Rena | | |
| The Scout | | | |
| Scream 2 | Cici | Dubbing for Sarah Michelle Gellar | |

=== Other media ===
- Macne Nana, Macne Petit and Whisper☆Angel Sasayaki (Macne series)
- Pun-Colle ~voice actresses' legendary punk songs collection (2009) – songs "Basket Case" and "God Save the Queen"
