= Hamtaro (video game series) =

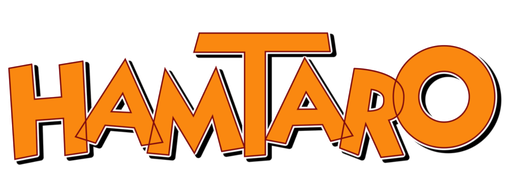
- Genres: Adventure game Educational game
- Developers: Nintendo; Pax Softnica; AlphaDream; Sega Toys; ImaginEngine
- Publishers: Nintendo; Marvelous Interactive; 505 Games; Natsume Inc. Sega Toys; The Learning Company
- Platforms: Game Boy Color, Sega Pico, Game Boy Advance, Microsoft Windows, Mac OS, Nintendo DS, iOS
- First release: Tottoko Hamtaro: Tomodachi Daisakusen Dechu: JP: September 8, 2000
- Latest release: Hamtaro: Little Hamsters, Big Adventures: NA: April 12, 2011
- Parent series: Hamtaro

Hamtaro is a series of video games based on the Hamtaro anime series.

== Games ==
=== Tomodachi Daisakusen Dechu ===
Tottoko Hamtaro: Tomodachi Daisakusen Dechu
- Developer: Pax Softnica
- Publisher: Nintendo
- Platform: Game Boy Color
- Release: JP: September 8, 2000
- Genre: Fortune-telling
- Modes: Single-player; Multi-player

Tottoko Hamtaro: Tomodachi Daisakusen Dechu (Note: Japanese: とっとこハム太郎 ともだち大作戦でちゅ, Hepburn: Tottoko Hamutarō: Tomodachi Daisakusen Dechu; lit. "Tottoko Hamtaro: Operation Friend") is a fortune-telling game released in Japan for the Game Boy Color in 2000. Though it has the appearance of a virtual pet game, the game contains no pet-raising elements nor direct ways to interact with Hamtaro. Rather, the game asks the player to fill out a notebook with information (full name, nickname, gender, birth date, and blood type) about themselves, their family, and their friends. This information is then used to pseudo-randomly generate predictions about the person – which Ham-Ham they're most like, their personality traits, their romantic or platonic compatibility with other people that have been entered, etc. – creating the appearance of fortune-telling. The game also has a real-time element, through which Hamtaro will occasionally speak to you of his own accord. Notebook entries can also be traded with other people via the Game Boy Color's infrared feature.

It was the ninth best selling game on the Game Boy Color platform in Japan, with 343,950 copies sold. It would later be the foundation for Tomodachi Collection (and, by extension, the Tomodachi series) – in a Japanese Iwata Asks interview, Ryutaro Takahashi revealed that the development of that game began with Yoshio Sakamoto stating: "I want to make a version [of Tomodachi Daisakusen Dechu] that adult women could play." This led to the game's inception under the working title Otona no Onna no Uranai Techō (大人のオンナの占い手帳, lit."The Adult Woman's Fortune-Telling Notebook").

=== Ham-Hams Unite! ===
Hamtaro: Ham-Hams Unite! (Note: Japanese: とっとこハム太郎2 ハムちゃんず大集合でちゅ, Hepburn: Tottoko Hamutarō 2 Hamu-chanzu Daishūgō Dechu; lit. "Trotting Hamtaro 2: Great Ham-Ham Gathering") is a Hamtaro adventure video game developed by Pax Softnica and published by Nintendo for the Game Boy Color handheld video game console. It was first released in Japan on April 21, 2001, and was later released in North America on October 28, 2002, and in Europe on January 10, 2003. It was the last game officially released for the Game Boy Color in Europe. It was the seventh best selling Game Boy Color game in Japan, with 497,061 copies sold.

The player (Hamtaro) is controlled by the D-pad, and holding down the B button allows the player to run. Pressing A will open a dialogue box with different Ham-chat words depending on context. For instance, standing next to a sunflower seed and selecting "hif-hif" will pick up the seed, while standing next to an NPC and selecting "Hamha" will open a dialogue with the character. Different options will yield different outcomes, rolling (Tack-Q) into NPCs will usually elicit a negative response. Objects in the world can be interacted with, like climbing trees and pulling drawers open.

The player enters the Clubhouse and is directed by the Boss to round up the other hamsters.

=== Ham-Ham Heartbreak ===
Hamtaro: Ham-Ham Heartbreak is a video game for Game Boy Advance developed by Pax Softnica and published by Nintendo, as the sequel to Tottoko Hamutaro: Tomodachi Daisakusen Dechu and Hamtaro: Ham-Hams Unite!. Therefore, it was the second Hamtaro game released in America and Europe, but the third one in Japan. It was released in Japan on May 3, 2002, in North America on April 8, 2003, and in Europe on June 27, 2003. After Hamtaro: Ham-Ham Heartbreak, only one more Hamtaro adventure game was released, which was Hamtaro: Rainbow Rescue.

Like its predecessors, Hamtaro: Ham-Ham Heartbreak is an adventure game. Set in the world of the Hamtaro books and anime, the player controls the hamster ("Ham-Ham", as the hamsters tend to call themselves) Hamtaro. The game expands on the gameplay of the earlier titles by adding Bijou, a friend of Hamtaro who has a crush on him, as partner. Together, they have to save the other ham-hams from Spat, an evil hamster with a hatred for any kind of relation.

=== Wake Up Snoozer! ===
- Developer: ImaginEngine
- Publisher: The Learning Company
- Platforms: Microsoft Windows, Mac OS
- Release: 2003
- Genre: Educational game
- Mode: Single-player

Hamtaro: Wake Up Snoozer! is a 2003 educational game for Microsoft Windows and Mac OS. It is the only Hamtaro game to be released for PC/Macintosh.

Hamtaro and his friends play minigames to wake up Snoozer. The minigames are child-oriented. The game includes special features to work with the Ham-Hams such as: Hamtaro, Bijou, Panda, Howdy, Dexter, Pashmina, Boss, and Oxnard. And options to return to clubhouse, and more.

=== Rainbow Rescue ===
Hamtaro: Rainbow Rescue (Note: Japanese: とっとこハム太郎4 にじいろ大行進でちゅ, Hepburn: Tottoko Hamtaro 4 Nijiiro Daikoushin Dechu; lit. "Trotting Hamtaro 4: Big Rainbow-Color Parade") is a video game developed by AlphaDream and published by Nintendo for the Game Boy Advance. It's the sequel to Tottoko Hamutarō: Tomodachi Daisakusen Dechu, Hamtaro: Ham-Hams Unite! and Hamtaro: Ham-Ham Heartbreak. It was released in Japan and PAL regions, and was set to be released in North America, but it was cancelled. The series is based on the manga Hamtaro, written by Ritsuko Kawai.

The game features an extensive plot. One day while playing outside, Bijou witnesses a great rainbow. The rainbow disappears and Prince Bo falls to the ground. The Prince states that he can make rainbows by using his umbrella. He tries to prove it to disbelieving Stan and the rest of the Ham-Hams, but realizes too late that the colors on his umbrella are gone. And thus, Hamtaro and his Ham-Ham friends must set off on a journey in order to collect things that are the proper color for Prince Bo to use for his umbrella so he can create a rainbow to return home.

Certain minigames are needed to reach the colors, and the player must have certain Ham-Hams in their party in order to play them. For example, Sandy is needed to ride pigeons, Bijou is needed to collect falling petals, and Penelope is needed for rolling on top of cans to get across small streams. In addition to the original Ham-Hams, the game contains some additional characters, most of which were never seen in the English anime. These include Prince Bo, who is the prince of Rainbowland (a castle that is made of clouds); Flora, or Nurse-Ham; Tux; and other various characters.

In Japan, Famitsu gave it a score of two eights and two sevens for a total of 30 out of 40.

=== Hamtaro: Ham-Ham Games ===
Hamtaro: Ham-Ham Games
- Developer: AlphaDream
- Publisher: Nintendo
- Directors: Chihiro Fujioka; Takahiro Murakami
- Producers: Shigeru Miyamoto; Kenji Miki; Tetsuo Mizuno
- Designers: Hiroshi Nonaka; Takashi Arai; Yuichi Nakagawa; Masaki Tanaka; Jun Iwasaki
- Platform: Game Boy Advance
- Release: JP: July 15, 2004; PAL: July 16, 2004; NA: July 27, 2004
- Genre: Sports game
- Modes: Single-player; Multi-player

Hamtaro: Ham-Ham Games (Note: Japanese: とっとこハム太郎 ハムハムスポーツ, Hepburn: Tottoko Hamutarō: Hamuhamu Supōtsu; lit. "Trotting Hamtaro: Ham-Ham Sports") is a sports video game developed by AlphaDream and published by Nintendo for the Game Boy Advance handheld video game console. It was released in Japan on July 15, 2004, in Europe on July 16, 2004, and in North America on July 27, 2004.

Reception

Aggregate score
Aggregator	Score
Metacritic	77/100

Review scores
Publication	Score
Famitsu	30/40
GamePro	4.5/5
GameSpy	4/5
GamesTM	6/10
GameZone	8/10
IGN	8/10
NGC Magazine	60%
Nintendo Power	3.7/5
Nintendo World Report	7.5/10
The Times	4/5

The game received "generally favorable reviews" according to the review aggregation website Metacritic. In Japan, Famitsu gave it a score of one seven, two eights, and one seven for a total of 30 out of 40.

=== Tottoko Hamtaro Nazo Nazo Q Kumonoue no ? Jou ===
Tottoko Hamtaro Nazo Nazo Q Kumonoue no ? Jou
- Developer: AlphaDream
- Publisher: Nintendo
- Director: Yoshihiko Maekawa
- Producers: Kensuke Tanabe; Tetsuo Mizuno
- Platform: Nintendo DS
- Release: JP: December 1, 2005
- Genre: Quiz
- Modes: Single-player; Multi-player

Tottoko Hamtaro Nazo Nazo Q Kumonoue no ? Jou (Note: Japanese: とっとこハム太郎 ナゾナゾQ 雲の上の？城, Hepburn: Tottoko Hamutarō Nazonazo Q Kumo no Ue no Hatena-Jō; lit. Trotting Hamtaro Riddle Q: ? Castle in the Clouds) is a quiz video game released for the Nintendo DS in Japan in 2005. Eschewing an explorable world, this game consists of a large collection of quiz questions, most of which are wordplay-based riddles. A fraction of questions is dedicated to subjects such as mathematics and science, and to trivia about the Ham-Hams. Progress in the game is made by answering multiple levels of randomly selected questions in a multiple-choice format – though all but one kana of each answer is blacked out. To successfully answer these, the player is tasked with first playing a training mode which offers hints and the ability to reveal blacked-out kana, and thus learn the answer to each question in advance. During play, sunflower seeds are earned, which can be used as currency for furnishing a virtual home.

=== Hi Hamtaro! Ham-Ham Training ===
Hi Hamtaro! Ham-Ham Training
- Developer: AlphaDream
- Publishers: JP: Marvelous Interactive; PAL: 505 Games; NA: Natsume Inc.
- Directors: Chihiro Fujioka; Kenichi Murakami
- Producer: Yoshihiko Maekawa
- Platform: Nintendo DS
- Release: JP: March 15, 2007; PAL: May 23, 2008; NA: September 23, 2008
- Genre: Puzzle
- Mode: Single-player

Hi Hamtaro! Ham-Ham Training, (Note: Japanese: とっとこハム太郎 は～い! ハムちゃんずのハムハムチャレンジ! あつまれは～い!, Hepburn: Tottoko Hamutarō Hāi! Hamuchanzu no Hamuhamu Charenji! Atsumare Hāi!; lit. "Trotting Hamtaro, Okay! The Ham-Hams' Ham-Ham Challenge! Let's Get Together, Okay!) known as Hi! Hamtaro Ham-Ham Challenge in North America, is a puzzle game for the Nintendo DS made by AlphaDream and published by Marvelous in Japan, 505 Games in PAL regions, and Natsume Inc. in North America. It is a sequel to Hamtaro: Ham-Hams Unite!, Hamtaro: Ham-Ham Heartbreak, Hamtaro: Rainbow Rescue (which was never released in America), Hamtaro: Ham-Ham Games, and the Japan-only Tottoko Hamtaro Nazonazo Q: Kumo no Ue no ?-Jō, and is based on the anime series Hamtaro. The game was released in Japan on March 15, 2007, in Europe on May 23, 2008, and in North America on September 23, 2008.

=== Hamtaro: Little Hamsters, Big Adventures ===
Hamtaro: Little Hamsters, Big Adventures was a videogame released for iOS in 2011. It was delisted from the App Store in 2014 and is thus no longer playable.
