= List of Maria-sama ga Miteru characters =

This is the list of characters of the light novel, manga and anime series Maria-sama ga Miteru. Most of the characters either attend Lillian School for Girls, or in the case of male characters, are related to or dating a student of Lillian.

== Chart ==
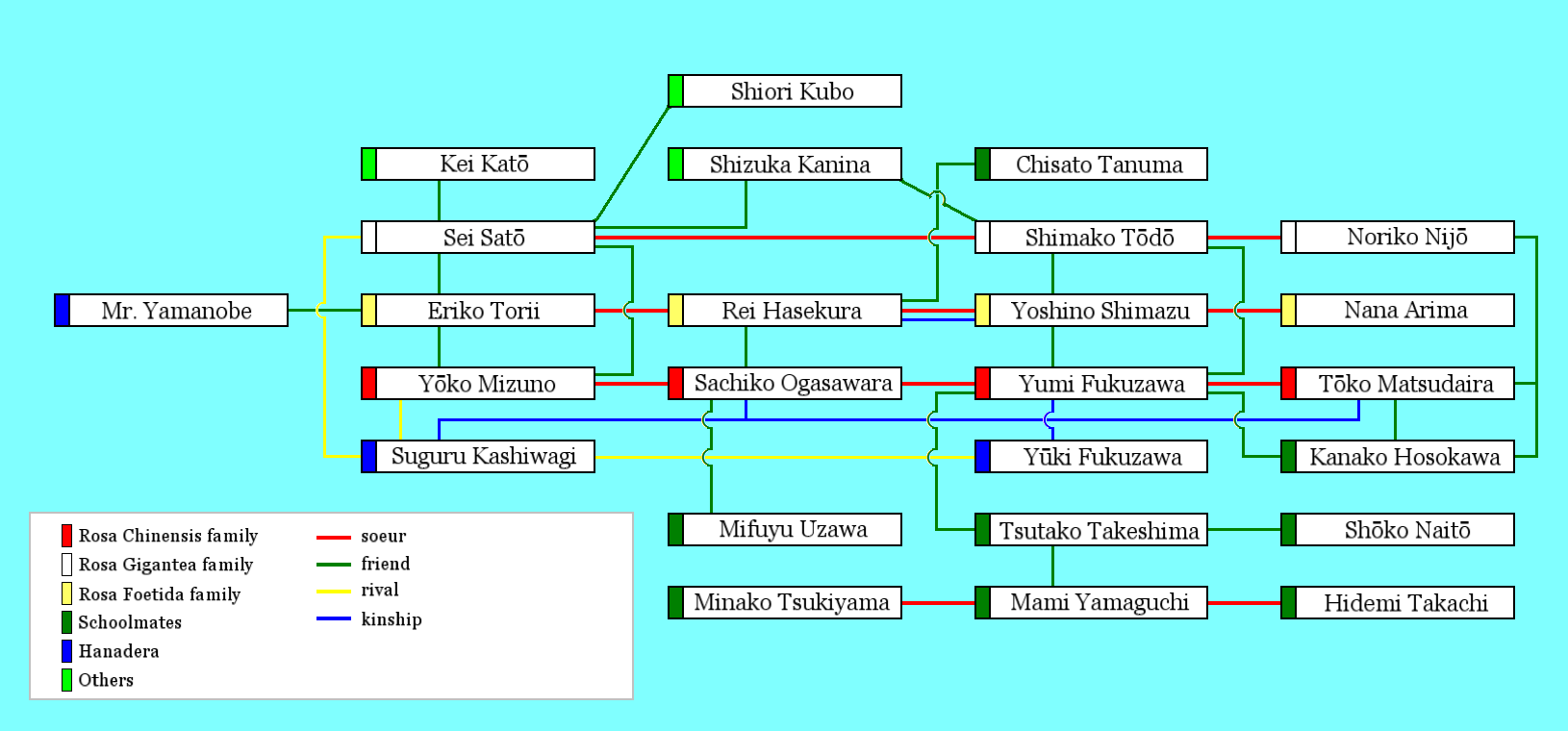

== Rose families ==
Yumi (left) with Sachiko (right)

=== Chinensis family ===
Yumi Fukuzawa (福沢 祐巳, Fukuzawa Yumi)
Voiced by: Kana Ueda
Played by: Honoka Miki
She is the main character of the series. In the beginning of the series, Yumi is bashful beyond words, very timid and unsure of herself. She first met Sachiko, the star of Lillian School and had her tie fixed by Sachiko, which mortified Yumi. Yumi's friend, Tsutako Takeshima, took a cute picture of this and wanted to display it in the school festival. Tsutako got Yumi to ask permission from Sachiko. Other characters often comment on how her emotions 'show on her face'.
After Yumi first meets Sachiko, Sachiko is arguing with the Roses in the Rose Mansion. The Roses say that Sachiko cannot object to their plan, as she did not have a petite sœur. Sachiko runs out of the meeting and knocks Yumi over. She asks if Yumi has a grande sœur, and promptly offered Yumi her rosary. Sachiko thought that if she had a petite sœur, the Yamayurikai could not force her to play Cinderella alongside a male. Yumi refused Sachiko's rosary, as she would be accepting it for the wrong reasons. Sei Satō offers a bet to Sachiko—if she could convince Yumi to be her petite sœur, the role of Cinderella will go to Yumi. If she could not, she must play Cinderella. Sachiko tells Yumi that she, Sachiko, will definitely become Yumi's sœur. But deep inside Yumi, she feels terribly hurt by how nonchalantly Sachiko chose her randomly as her petite sœur; but despite this, in a monologue (page 129 of the first novel), feels that precisely because she still likes Sachiko very much, she has "summoned the last vestiges of her pride to refuse Sachiko's rosary, and wishes Sachiko to at least understand how hurt she feels to be 'just a random pick'".
At a dress rehearsal for the play, it is revealed that the male who plays the prince, Suguru, is Sachiko's cousin and fiancé. Sachiko accuses him of going too far and runs away; Yumi follows her to the greenhouse. Yumi at first thinks that she cannot do anything for Sachiko, but Sachiko cries on her shoulder. Yumi offers to take the rosary, but Sachiko refuses. Sachiko tells Yumi about the arranged marriage, and that Suguru does not love her, but she loves him. After the play, there is a bonfire. Yumi thinks sadly that she would not have an excuse to have anything more to do with Sachiko, but suddenly Sachiko appears and offers Yumi her rosary; this time, Yumi accepts.
When the third years are about to graduate, Yumi asks Sei if she had anything to ask her, like taking care of the stray cat Goronta, or looking after Shimako. Sei says Yumi is the type of girl who will help even if not asked, so she is not worried about Shimako. Sei instead asked for a kiss on the mouth as a parting gift; Yumi tried to run away, but Sei hugged her. Sei thanked Yumi for helping her pass her examinations, since Yumi gave Sei a reason to live again. She also said that Yumi tried to run away so that it would not be Sei who was leaving her, but the other way around. Yumi realized that this is true. Yumi often gets hugged by Sei throughout the series, who thinks her to be very cute, which sometimes makes Sachiko angry due to jealousy. Yumi finds out from Shimako, however, that Sei would actually be going to the Lillian's Girls' University, which is in the same area as Yumi's school. She gets angry at Sei for not telling her, but is happy because Sei will not be leaving her after all.
After the third years graduate, spring comes, along with the arrival of Tōko, Sachiko's cousin. Yumi feels jealous of Tōko's closeness with Sachiko, but does not say anything about it. Yumi later finds out the truth about Sachiko's grandmother dying. At the day of the funeral, Sachiko apologizes and Yumi says that she loved her onee-sama very much.
At the beginning of the OVAs, Sachiko invited Yumi to her summer home for a vacation. Sachiko's acquaintances make trouble for them, especially Yumi. They later invite Yumi and Sachiko to a party which turns out to be the eighty-eighth birthday party of one of the acquaintances' great grandmother. The acquaintances ask Yumi to play a musical instrument. Yumi says that she is no good at playing anything, but sings the song "Maria-sama no Kokoro", with Sachiko accompanying her on the piano mid-song. The great grandmother applauds and congratulates Yumi for her song, because it brings back memories. She calls Yumi a cute angel, and asks her to visit next year. That ultimately foiled the acquaintances' plans to embarrass her.
In the second OVA, Yumi sets up a casual meeting with the Yamayuri Council and the Hanadera Council to discuss the upcoming festivities for both schools. Yumi did not inform Sachiko of the meeting, because of her hatred for men, and planned to trick her into attending. However, Yumi felt she was betraying Sachiko and confessed her intentions. Yumi felt that Sachiko should attend on her own free will, because she will find herself in similar situations in the future. Sachiko noted that Yumi has learned to handle her well and that she happily complies with her wishes. We also learn about Yumi's "type" through a conversation with her brother. She describes ones who are pretty, smart, who at first seem like they have warped personalities but on the inside are warm-hearted. Yūki remarks that she's describing Sachiko, much to her surprise.
Yumi is tasked by Sachiko in the fourth season to look for a petite sœur. By then, she has already an increasing involvement in the Yamayuri Council. Also, a slow but steady change can be seen in her (especially after Tōko comes into her life) – Yumi begins to try to mature out of her own shell and to become more independent, calm and collected.

Sachiko Ogasawara (小笠原 祥子, Ogasawara Sachiko)
Voiced by: Miki Itō
Played by: Haru
When Yumi first runs into her in the student council room, Sachiko is portrayed as someone who is a far cry from the perfect lady that Yumi pictures her to be (this might not be apparent in the anime and manga, as the novel has a more detailed account of the incident). In the novel, Sachiko somewhat knew Yumi is her fan and was overconfident that Yumi would never refuse her.
Though prim, elegant, and somewhat aloof, Sachiko has both a rough (the novel and manga affectionately terms this as her "hysterical side") and a very sweet side. She is also afraid of heights and dislikes men, to the point where she will do anything she can to avoid interacting or being near one. She is very protective of Yumi and cares deeply about her. This is proven during Hanadera's school festival. After agonizing over Yumi's disappearance during an event, when Yumi appeared in a panda costume, Sachiko climbed down a tall ladder and ran through the crowd of men to reach her. This also proved a statement that Sachiko had made earlier; that even if Yumi and a thousand other people were wrapped up like mummies she could still find Yumi on her first try. However, Sachiko often has the same problem that Yumi does—she does not share most of her problems with her sœur, causing many misunderstandings. Sachiko is slated to marry her cousin and fiancé Suguru after she graduates. This has caused her some distress since, because although she initially cared deeply for him, he did not reciprocate. They now have a complicated relationship.
Sachiko also cares a lot for her peer, Rei, especially with regards to the latter's conflicts with Yoshino – she once went all the way to beg with Rosa Chinensis and Gigantea (even going into her hysterical mode) to help out; she gives Rei a hug when the latter is unsure of how she could balance between her "own future and own life" and "life with/without Yoshino" during the latter parts of the series.
Sometimes, Yumi must teach Sachiko how to live informally, for example, helping her select her first pair of jeans and eating in a fastfood restaurant. Despite her sometimes stern appearance, Sachiko has her own share of insecurities regarding her relationship with Yumi, not to mention emotional insecurities rising from her home life; both her father and grandfather openly have mistresses, unabashedly dividing their time between home and the mistresses, which apparently led to her general disdain for men, as illustrated in the OVA series during a meeting with the student council members of Hanadera, an all-boys' high school.
After Sachiko enters her third year, she is now the new Rosa Chinensis. After the arrival of Tōko, Sachiko spends more time with her than with Yumi, which makes Yumi jealous. Sachiko goes absent from school which makes Yumi worried. Later, Yōko is sent to "bring" Yumi to Sachiko's grandmother house. Yumi finds out that Sachiko's grandmother recently died, which causes Sachiko to go into depression. Sachiko says that she apologizes for the past few weeks, and asks for Yumi's forgiveness; Yumi says that she loves her very much.
At the beginning of the summer holidays, Sachiko takes Yumi to her summer home. Whilst there, Sachiko's acquaintances make trouble for them due to their jealousy regarding the closeness of Sachiko and Yumi's relationship. Sachiko wants to leave to protect Yumi, but Yumi refuses. The acquaintances have a party, and invite them but make plans to embarrass Yumi instead. At the party, they ask Yumi to play a musical instrument for one of the acquaintances great grandmother. Yumi says that she cannot play anything and prefers to sing the song "Maria-sama no Kokoro", and Sachiko accompanies her with a piano performance. The great grandmother is happy because the song brings back fond memories, and she asks Yumi to visit next year, foiling the acquaintances' plans for her humiliation in the process.
In the fourth season, Sachiko is already asking Yumi to look for a petite sœur, although she is still deeply concerned about Yumi, especially when one potential candidate for the future Rosa Chinensis en bouton rejected Yumi, at first. Later on, she makes plans to attend a nearby college after graduation so she can be near Yumi.

Tōko Matsudaira (松平 瞳子, Matsudaira Tōko)
Voiced by: Rie Kugimiya
A distant relative and fan of Sachiko. She arrives at Lillian during Yumi's second year. Tōko is a member of the Drama club, and nicknamed Mechanical Drill by Sei Satō for her corkscrew pigtails. In the beginning of her first year, Tōko causes some strain in the relationship between Yumi and Sachiko. However, later on in the year that she becomes Yumi's petite sœur.
Tōko is also an accomplished actress. She was able to use this talent during several occasions (when the Yamayuri Council decides to expose Shimako's family background) and when Tōko becomes one of the cast in the Yamayuri Council stage play. In the eighteenth novel, the narration also remarks how Tōko was able to bring her natural acting skills to bear when she tries to hide her complicated relationships with her seniors in the drama club – she does this so well that even Sachiko did not notice anything wrong.
Though Tōko might seem to always act rude towards Yumi (she often scolds Yumi for being air-headed, for being too lenient and soft towards Kanako, for being too naive) but upon the nineteenth novel, a short excerpt of her thoughts during her fallout with her drama club members show that she has also felt touched by Yumi's caring personality (though she does not show it on her face).
By the fourth season, Tōko's personality starts to unravel--she may be proud and headstrong, but she is still a fickle, fragile girl with a mysterious secret. This leads to events in volume twenty-one of the novels, and in the fourth season of the anime, where Tōko initially rejects Yumi's rosary when the latter requests Tōko to become her petite sœur. The thirteenth and final episode of the fourth season reveals Tōko's secret, as she told Yumi on their date. As an infant, Tōko was orphaned when she and her parents were involved in a vehicular accident, and she was the only survivor. No one in her family could feasibly take her in, so she was sent to an orphanage, and was eventually adopted by the Matsudairas. She found out the truth later after listening in to some of her relatives' conversations, and confirming it in a registry. The picture Tōko showed to Yumi showed Tōko's natural mother and foster mother, who, by coincidence, were classmates in Lilian High School (and it was Tōko's foster mother who, as seen in the picture, happened to bear the corkscrew pigtails Tōko herself sports). By yet another coincidence, Tōko's natural mother was a member of the school's drama club, which led to Tōko's own problems with her membership in the drama club. Tōko is very grateful towards her foster parents, but cannot break out of the lingering guilt that there is nothing that she can do to repay all the kindness that she feels she doesn't deserve (she once mentions to her father that a life should be one of "give and take"). On top of that, she was very mistaken that Yumi offered her rosario out of sympathy (and Tōko hated pity for herself out of everything else), so Tōko cannot help but distance herself from everything and everyone that will give her happiness (from her favorite drama club to her beloved Yumi-sama). But after a series of events leading to a date with Yumi and revealing all this to her, Tōko is eventually at peace with herself, and receives Yumi's rosary and becomes the future Rosa Chinensis en bouton, in front of the incumbent but soon to step down Rosa Chinensis, Sachiko.

Yōko Mizuno (水野 蓉子, Mizuno Yōko)
Voiced by: Emi Shinohara
Played by: Kaoru Hirata
Calm and reserved, but usually with a smirk on her face, Yōko is Sachiko's grande sœur. As the nearly indisputable leader of the Yamayurikai during her time as Rosa Chinensis, she played a major role in maintaining stability in its sometimes unstable environment. Though usually cool and refined, she was also known to have a fun side. Additionally, it has been implied that she has an unrequited love for Sei Satō. She made Sachiko her petite sœur in a situation happened like Sachiko did to Yumi. In Sachiko's second year, Yōko argues with Sachiko about the Cinderella play since she does not want to play with a male. Yumi suddenly comes in, and Yōko and the other two Roses offer them a bet. This eventually leads Yumi to become Sachiko's petite sœur. She does not appear much in the first season because of her exams. Before Valentine's Day, Minako Tsukiyama comes and asks the Yamayurikai if they can host the Card Hunting Game. Yōko says she wants the Roses Mansion to be one of the hunting locations so she can see the Roses Mansion filled with ordinary students before her graduation.
At the beginning of the second season, Yōko comes to Sachiko's house on New Year's Day with the other Yamayurikai members, to join in a party there. Two days before her graduation ceremony, she comes up to Yumi from behind, giving her a surprise hug. Yumi asks if she is trying to make fun of her, but Yōko says that she wanted to hug her once before she leaves. She takes Yumi for a drink, telling the younger girl to take care of Sachiko.
After the third year Roses graduate, only Sei ends up going to Lilian university; this makes Sachiko cry when she was chosen to give her onee-sama a goodbye speech at the ceremony. Yōko, at first, does not want to help her because that would imply that Sachiko is weak if she keeps relying on her onee-sama. When she cannot take anymore, she tries to help her, but Rei goes to help Sachiko to say farewell to the third years. Seeing that her sœur has changed, Yōko is happy, saying that she can leave Lilian without any worries now. A few months later, when Sachiko's grandmother dies, Yōko is requested by her mother to meet Yumi. On their way to Sachiko's great grandmother's house, she explains everything to Yumi.

=== Gigantea family ===
Sei Satō (佐藤 聖, Satō Sei)
Voiced by: Megumi Toyoguchi
Played by: Karen Takizawa
The exact opposite of most of the characters in the series: loud, rough-around-the-edges, she loves doing what she can to push other peoples' buttons. She especially finds joy in teasing Yumi (and also enjoys irritating Sachiko in the process) as she likes to see their reactions; Yumi affectionately calls that her "old man" behavior. However, Sei is one of the wisest and most caring characters in the series. Though seeming to have a playful and laid-back attitude, Sei has experienced many tragedies in her life, especially in her second year. Sei's personality was very different in her first two years. She was uninterested in everything, and never joked around like she did in her third year. Sei believes that Shimako should learn to solve her problems on her own, then only will she become strong. After leaving Lilian high school, Sei still appears as a secondary character.
While the relationship between Sei and Shimako seems cold, the truth is Shimako is extremely devoted to Sei. Their relationship, as Yumi noted, is something that cannot be easily understood. After graduating from the high school division of Lillian, Sei studies English and American Literature at Lillian University. Sei shortens her hair when she goes to study at the university, as indicated in her appearances in the fourth season. She is initially the only one among the Yamayurikai who can drive. She once took Yumi for a ride in her car.

Shimako Tōdō (藤堂 志摩子, Tōdō Shimako)
Voiced by: Mamiko Noto
Played by: Riho Takada
Prim, proper and very beautiful (there were a few instances in the novel where the narration describes her skin as very fair, or even pale, and her complexion "like an antique western doll"), Shimako is the most admired of the first-years. She is the petite sœur of Sei at the beginning of the story and later is her successor. Underneath Shimako's quiet, mannerly exterior lies a surprisingly strong resolve, calm personality and thoughtfulness. During Sachiko's initial attempt to perform the sœur ritual on Yumi in front of the entire student council body, Shimako was the only one who considered Yumi's feelings of being forced to be one, and Shimako was brave enough to voice it out. Despite this, she has her uncertainties about herself. She is even unable to decide whether she should run for the next Rosa Gigantea at first, since she is not the type to lead people, and also because she just wants to work, not so much for the council, but for Sei herself. During the Valentine's Day arc (with reference from the novel), we see that though Shimako is outwardly strong, she realises that she is actually very afraid of losing the relationships she has gained so far, hence explaining how she divulged to Yumi that she feels relationships and sense of belonging are only "shackles". Reminiscent of Sei in her third year, Shimako is unsure of how to find a petite sœur in her second year after Sei leaves. She meets Noriko under the cherry blossoms, like how she first met Sei and later asks her to become her petite sœur.
Shimako was somber in the first two seasons. But she realises, after a phone conversation with Noriko before her trip to Italy, that her school is no longer a cage, but a nest, i.e. a place she can rest. With this newfound emotional gratification and assurance that Noriko will always be with her, Shimako begins to open her heart to others more, and smile more often. It is also stated several times in the novel that Shimako and Noriko looks like a pair of Western and Japanese dolls, and that Shimako has a feverish passion for collecting ginkgo seeds. In contrast to her placid and serious attitude, Shimako's father (who works as a lead monk in their temple) is a lot more light-hearted and hearty, and he was also the one who encouraged Shimako to be open her heart more.

Noriko Nijō (二条 乃梨子, Nijō Noriko)
Voiced by: Kaori Shimizu
A young girl with a fascination with Buddhist statues and art. She enters Lillian Academy (a strictly Catholic institution) due to an unexpected turn of events. Due to this fact, she faces an astounding cultural shock (from the old-fashioned style school uniform to the students' mannerisms that she finds too antique and too "refined" to get accustomed to). Even in the novel's narrative, Shimako is referred as "Shimako-san" from Noriko's perspective, and not the usual "Shimako-sama" as default to all upper-classmen, and the fact that she hardly uses polite Japanese when talking to Shimako in private, also defines Noriko's detachment from Lillian's culture. She has a straightforward temper that contradicts her calm exterior and becomes Shimako's petite sœur after Shimako enters her second year. Her very plain and jet-black hairstyle makes her look like a traditional Japanese doll, another stark contrast to Shimako's "western doll" appearance.

Sei's Onee-sama (聖のお姉さま, Sei no Onēsama), Former Rosa Gigantea (元・白薔薇さま, Moto Rosagigantia)
Voiced by: Minami Takayama
Sei's Onee-sama is not given a name, but appears in flashbacks. She apparently chose Sei because she liked the latter's beautiful face (she said she chose Sei for her face so as to not give the latter any pressure or expectations). She does not pressure Sei to find a petite sœur, nor coerce her into making Shiori into one; rather, she tells Sei to choose her own path without any regrets. In the third novel, Sei describes her as someone who is noble enough to be worthy of the Gigantea title; she really does, care for Sei, as shown after Shiori leaves. Sei began to depend on her a lot after this too. She graduated from Lillian wishing Sei to find a good petite sœur.

=== Foetida family ===
Yoshino Shimazu (島津 由乃, Shimazu Yoshino)
Voiced by: Haruna Ikezawa
Played by: Hitomi Miyake
In the beginning of the series, Yoshino is a girl who is very ill and cared for constantly by her grande sœur, Rei. In the second novel, when Yumi was watching Yoshino, Yoshino is described as a girl who is "on the skinny side, but not emaciated—simply that she has a small frame"; her eyelashes are described to be "thick than long"; and that she has an aura (maybe because she is sickly at first) that makes one want to protect her and make her a petite sœur. Yoshino is voted as the best petite sœur near the beginning of the series, as everyone considered her to be soft and sweet; this is only her reputation however. Yoshino is very independent and in some ways tomboyish, despite her sickly status and feminine appearance. After her heart surgery, she becomes more energetic throughout the series, and Yumi begins to see more of her fits of temper (usually directed towards Rei). While Yoshino maintains her "sweet and gentle" image in public, she has apparently grown close and comfortable enough to show her temperamental side to Yumi as well (during their trip to Italy, Yoshino reveals that Yumi is the only one she can comfortably show her weakness to). Yumi also learns that Yoshino is very quick-witted and sharp—Yoshino is able to understand concepts and read between the lines of things so well that Yumi sometimes coins her as a psychic. In addition to being Rei's petite sœur, Yoshino is also her cousin and next-door neighbor. Yoshino admires and very attached to Rei (and has a knack for throwing tantrums at Rei when she gets jealous or over small issues), however she becomes upset with Rei every time she acts overprotective and fragile.

Rei Hasekura (支倉 令, Hasekura Rei)
Voiced by: Shizuka Itō
Played by: Rikako Sakata
Rei, Yoshino's grande sœur, appears very tomboyish and 'bishōnen' on the outside, but is in fact quite gentle despite her appearances. In the second novel, she admits that without Yoshino, her real self is just a weak, timid and lonely crybaby. She enjoys reading shōjo novels, her favorite word is 'sincerity', and her hobby is sightseeing. She is involved in kendo, but obsessively cares about Yoshino (and often has to put up with Yoshino's mood swings) and prefers the domestic arts, like cooking, baking and sewing (the scarf and mittens Yoshino wears are all made by her). In the fourth season, she says that, due to "unexpected events", she has a ten-year-old boyfriend.

Eriko Torii (鳥居 江利子, Torii Eriko)
Voiced by: Hitomi Nabatame
Played by: Nana Akiyama
Rei's grande sœur; one of the most well-respected of the Yamayurikai. She is very gifted and good at almost everything, although she is also enigmatic and eccentric. She has a large forehead, which Sei made fun of when they were young, and began their rivalry. She said once that she chose Rei as her sœur to see if anything interesting would happen. She often has friction with Yoshino, as the younger girl is jealous of her bond with Rei (though Eriko herself finds it interesting to tease Yoshino with regards to this). Eriko has three over-protective older brothers. After leaving Lillian, she studies the Arts. She hates the dentist above all else. She is in love with an older man who is interested in dinosaurs.

== Schoolmates ==
=== In Sachiko's year ===
Minako Tsukiyama (築山 三奈子, Tsukiyama Minako)
Voiced by: Yuko Kaida
She is both Editor-in-Chief and president for the Lillian Kawaraban, the school's newspaper. She is hyperactive, dedicated to her duty as president, always thinking of new ways to get the newest scoop, and can at times give Yumi an uneasy feeling.
Shiori Kubo (久保 栞, Kubo Shiori)
Voiced by: Akiko Nakagawa
Sei Satō's ex-lover and best friend who was Sachiko Ogasawara's classmate. Her parents died when she was young. She left Lillian in her first year to pursue her dream of becoming a nun, which broke Sei's heart (who even became angry that she chose God and Maria-sama over her).
Shizuka Kanina (蟹名 静, Kanina Shizuka)
Voiced by: Rino
Also known as Rosa Canina, she is the star singer of the school choir. She admired Sei, but later on it is shown that she has also found an interest in Sei's petite sœur, Shimako. She left Lillian at the end of her second year to pursue a singing career in Italy, and keeps in touch with Shimako as a penfriend.
In the side story of the nineteenth novel, Shizuka's past is probed – she had a rather gray and lackluster mentality during her first and earlier parts of her second year. As a popular first-year, she received sœur requests from many upperclassmen, but rejected them all (including her choir club president), because she knows she will leave Lillian for Italy soon, and that her heart only longs for Sei. She likened herself as The Little Match Girl, albeit being unable to quench her desire and longing for Sei. The short story revolved around her coming to terms with herself and her resolve in overcoming her inability to approach Sei face-to-face (and thus building up the explanation for her somewhat bold move in taking part in the Yamayuri Council Elections, just to be able to stand in front of and be acknowledged by Sei).
Mifuyu Uzawa (鵜沢 美冬, Uzawa Mifuyu)
Voiced by: Yuki Masuda
Sachiko's classmate. She is shown as having a stalker-like attraction to Sachiko. The reason for this was because when they were in Lilian Nursery school, Mifuyu fell off the swing and sustained a large gash on her knee. While her friends ran off to get the teacher, Sachiko was the only one who helped her by giving her a handkerchief to stem the bleeding. Since then, Mifuyu has been obsessed with Sachiko. However, upon realizing that Yumi has something that she does not (the thing which attracted Sachiko to Yumi), Mifuyu takes her pigtails off, symbolizing that she finally let her obsession with her go. The author Konno reveals that she made up Mifuyu's name by reconstructing Yumi's name (without the letter "K" in Fukuzawa).

=== In Yumi's year ===
Mami Yamaguchi (山口 真美, Yamaguchi Mami)
Voiced by: Chiwa Saitō
Another staff member of the newspaper team, and Minako's sometimes irreverent petite sœur. However, like Minako, Mami herself is also always looking for the latest scoop. Mami also sometimes finds herself being the one to rein in Minako's hyperactive tendencies to run amok. But on the other hand, Minako often wishes that Mami wouldn't be so serious all the time, resulting in a rather unorthodox mix of sœurs.
Tsutako Takeshima (武嶋 蔦子, Takeshima Tsutako)
Voiced by: Rina Satou
Played by: Alice Hirose
Yumi's friend and avid photographer, she is the "ace" of the Photography Club and helps out sometimes for the school's newspaper. Never without her camera, she is always looking to capture the latest gossip about the Yamayurikai, and swears she can never be tied down to having a sœur of her own. She is sharp and constantly on the standby for the best shot; and with a quick brain and tongue to match, she often provides the emotional support and advice for Yumi. She sometimes unexpectedly defuses a few tensions within the Yamayurikai with her camera.
Katsura (桂)
Voiced by: Noriko Shitaya
A classmate of Yumi Fukuzawa, and a member of the tennis club.
Chisato Tanuma (田沼 ちさと, Tanuma Chisato)
Voiced by: Mikako Takahashi
She is part of the Kendo Club and is an admirer of Rei Hasekura. She went on a date with Rei in the first season after finding Rei's card in the treasure hunt on Valentine's Day. In the fourth season she is the finder of Yoshino's card.

=== One year below Yumi ===
Kanako Hosokawa (細川 可南子, Hosokawa Kanako)
Voiced by: Ami Koshimizu
A tall girl with a quiet (bordering on unapproachable – in the 14th novel, Noriko has described her as a "lone wolf") personality, and on top of that, a big fan of Yumi Fukuzawa, Kanako is introduced in the fourteenth novel, Suzukaze Satsusatsu (A Breath of Fresh Air). During the third season Kanako is actually more like a stalker than a fan and is treated as such when called the "Evil Spirit" who is following Yumi and the male acquaintances she makes from Hanadera. At first, Yumi was not aware of Kanako's lack of acquaintances and social life, as Kanako actively interacts with her (Yumi has also admittedly felt pressure not to stumble and make mistakes in front of an under-classmen who admires her). She revealed a similar, or even stronger hatred towards men to that of Sachiko, apparently stemming from problems she has with her father (she calls men "the lowest possible form of life"). Her father had an affair and a baby with Kanako's former senpai, Yūko. Initially, she imagines Yumi as the living entity of a "perfect and pure" girl (i.e. one who would not involve herself with men), and Yumi admits to Rei that she feels a lot of pressure having to stay on her toes. When that fabricated image was shattered later on (Kanako claims that Yumi's pure self was overtaken by another personality and is no longer her object of admiration, but someone she "couldn't care less about"), Yumi quickly acts to repair their strained relationship, and finds out that in the end, Kanako still greatly likes her (Kanako had always, and still wants to take a photo alone with Yumi). Kanako later regains her own emotional balance upon her reconciliation with Yūko. She is referred to by Marimite fans as Denpa. She is presented as one of the girls who may become Yumi's petite sœur. She appears briefly in the second season, despite the events of her novel debut not occurring until the third episode of the third season. As of the fourth anime season, she is already close to the Yamayurikai, and, at 179 cm tall, has plans to join the Lillian Academy basketball team.
Hidemi Takachi (高知 日出実, Takachi Hidemi)
Another staff member of the newspaper team, and Mami's petite sœur.
Shōko Naitō (内藤 笙子, Naitō Shōko)
Voiced by: Marina Inoue
She is part of the Photography Club. She loves photography, and wanted to be part of the Yamayurikai because of the photos she saw of them. She becomes an admirer of Tsutako. She has an older sister, Katsumi Naitō, who is voiced by Kaori Nazuka.

=== Two years below Yumi ===
Nana Arima (有馬 菜々, Arima Nana)
Voiced by: Hitomi Nabatame
A girl in her third year at Lillian Junior High School, and very likely to become Yoshino's petite sœur. Eriko mistook her for Yoshino's petite sœur at a kendo tournament. She is introduced in Soeur Audition.

== Others ==
Kei Katō (加東 景, Katō Kei)
Voiced by: Saiga Mitsuki
Sei Satō's friend and course-mate at Lillian University. She is first seen as the girl who rescued Yumi from the rain along with Sei. Sei mentions that she stood up during the welcoming ceremony when Kei was called because she thought she had heard her own name.
Yumiko Ikegami (池上 弓子, Ikegami Yumiko)
Voiced by: Gara Takashima
She is the landlady in the lodging house where Kei Katō stays. She is a graduate of Lillian.
Saiko (彩子)
Voiced by: Yoshiko Takemura
Sachiko's grandmother and a graduate of Lillian. She died at the end of the second season but not before reconciling with her old friend, Yumiko Ikegami.
Seiko Kasuga (春日 せい子, Kasuga Seiko)
Voiced by: Tomoko Miyadera
A graduate of Lillian, she wrote the novel The Forest of Thorns under the pen name "Sei Suga". She was confused with Sei Satō by most of the students of Lillian, which caused an uproar.
Suguru Kashiwagi (柏木 優, Kashiwagi Suguru)
Voiced by: Nobuyuki Hiyama
Played by: Masahiro Usui
He is Sachiko's cousin and arranged fiancé, because in order that a trusted man inherit the company owned by the Ogasawaras, their engagement was arranged, although Sachiko detests it and denies that he is her fiancé. He is very arrogant, and especially disliked by Sei, but he has prestige in Hanadera Boys' Academy since he is president of the Student Council there when the story begins. He is gay, and seems to have a crush on Yumi's brother, Yūki. Despite his arrogance (and a fast car), he does somewhat cares about Sachiko and is glad she has Yumi as a good friend. He also serves as a representative for the Matsudairas, keeping a close eye on Tōko. He also shows that he deeply cares for Tōko, as shown in the fourth season when, enraged by her bullies at their summer home, he put his car in Race Mode (he put the pedal to the metal) as the traffic lights went green. He has a reputation for his horrible driving skills—many people have given this feedback after taking a ride in his car (such as Sachiko, the Fukuzawa siblings, and Yoko).
Yūki Fukuzawa (福沢 祐麒, Fukuzawa Yūki)
Voiced by: Mitsuhiro Ichiki
The younger brother of Yumi, though both were born within the same year. One common mistake that non-Japanese fans make is that the Fukuzawa siblings are twins. This is not the case. Yumi refers to Yūki as her "toshigo no otōto" (年子の弟), which means "younger brother that was born within a year" and explains why Yumi and Yūki are in the same grade. The Japanese word for twins is "futago (双子). He loves Yumi very much and tries to help her in everything he can. He has good relations with the students of Lillian and is somewhat popular and is the only man that Sachiko isn't afraid of possibly because he is Yumi brother. At the beginning of the series, he did not empathize with Suguru, but Suguru invites Yūki to stay over for New Year's in his house; subsequently Suguru begins to perturb Yūki by giving him the nickname "Yūkichi". Yūki becomes the president of the Student Council of Hanadera due to his neutrality, as he does not belong to the cultural or sports clubs.
Professor Yamanobe (山辺 先生, Yamanobe-sensei)
Voiced by: Eiji Itō
Professor Yamanobe is a teacher at Hanadera. His passion is dinosaurs, and he loves going to the zoo to watch elephants (as he imagines dinosaurs would walk like elephants do). He is a widower with one daughter. His wife died about a year before the events of Itoshiki Toshitsuki. Eriko Torii proposes to him, which he declines. However she refuses to give up and promises him that she will make him fall in love with her.
