= Hamtaro: Ham-Hams Unite! =

2001 video game

- Cover art for Hamtaro: Ham-Hams Unite!
- Developer: Pax Softnica
- Publisher: Nintendo
- Director: Mariko Yumoto
- Producers: Shigeru Miyamoto; Kenji Miki; Masahiro Tatemoto
- Designer: Suzumu Tomizawa
- Composer: Satoko Yokota
- Series: Hamtaro
- Platform: Game Boy Color
- Release: JP: April 21, 2001; NA: October 28, 2002; EU: January 10, 2003
- Genre: Action
- Mode: Single-player

Hamtaro: Ham-Hams Unite! (Note: Known in Japan as Tottoko Hamutaro 2: Hamu-chanzu Daishuugou Dechu (とっとこハム太郎2 ハムちゃんず大集合でちゅ)) is an action video game developed by Pax Softnica and Nintendo and published by for the Game Boy Color handheld video game console. It is based on the Hamtaro anime and features much of the same characters. It launched in Japan in 2001, and later came to North America and Europe in 2002 and 2003 respectively. It was the final video game published on the Game Boy Color by Nintendo. Players control the hamster Hamtaro, who is tasked with gathering his friends and returning them to the clubhouse as well as collecting words missing from the Hamchat dictionary.

The game received generally positive reception, with reviewers such as IGN and Eurogamer noting its success as both a game for children and a game that could appeal to older audiences. It was the seventh best-selling game for the Game Boy Color in Japan. The successor of the 2000 Game Boy Color game Tottoko Hamtaro: Tomodachi Daisakusen Dechu, it was followed by Hamtaro: Ham-Ham Heartbreak in 2003 for the Game Boy Advance which featured similar gameplay mechanics.

== Gameplay and premise ==
Players can use dialogue options to have Hamtaro interact with characters and environments. The visuals were praised by critics.

Hamtaro: Ham Hams Unite is an action game based on the anime series Hamtaro. Players control protagonist Hamtaro as they seek out the various members of his clubhouse and attempts to fill in the Hamchat dictionary. He is tasked to do this by Boss, who also teaches him basic Hamchat words. Several of the characters from the anime, such as Bijou and Oxnard, are featured in the game as characters Hamtaro must seek out. Players do this using the appropriate dialogue options to solve puzzles and appease other hamsters. Players have four Hamchat words as options by default: "Hamha" for talking, "Digdig" for digging, "Tack-Q" for tackling, and "Hif-Hif" for sniffing, all of which allow players to interact with characters and environments and may help progress the story.

Hamchat words are accompanied by gestures. There are other words that players learn throughout the game that can be used in contextual situations. Characters may require words that are not yet available, indicated by question marks included in the dialogue choices, in order to fully interact with them. These words are unlocked by interacting with other characters. Sunflower seeds are a currency that can be exchanged for clothing items which Hamtaro can wear, which players can trade with each other using the Game Boy Color's infra-red port. The game features mini-games, including Ham-Jam where players can dance to the game's music using different Hamchat words, and Tack-Q Bowling.

== Development ==
Hamtaro: Ham-Hams Unite! was developed by Pax Softnica and Nintendo and published by Nintendo for the Game Boy Color. It was released in Japan on April 21, 2001, North America on October 29, 2002, and in Europe on January 10, 2003. It was the final video game released for the Game Boy Color by Nintendo. French localizers made attempts to make the language options in the game as explicit as possible to help players learn. It is a sequel to the 2000 Game Boy Color release Tottoko Hamtaro: Tomodachi Daisakusen Dechu. It was followed by Hamtaro: Ham-Ham Heartbreak for the Game Boy Advance in 2003, likewise developed by Pax Softnica and published by Nintendo, featuring similar gameplay.

== Reception ==
Reception

Aggregate score
Aggregator	Score
GameRankings	76%

Review scores
Publication	Score
Eurogamer	7/10
Famitsu	7/10, 7/10, 8/10, 6/10
GamePro	4/5
IGN	8/10
Nintendo Power	4/5, 4/5, 4/5, 4/5, 4.5/5
Nintendo World Report	3/10
X-Play	3/5

Hamtaro: Ham-Hams Unite! is the seventh best-selling Game Boy Color game in Japan, with 497,061 copies sold. The four reviewers in Famitsu complimented the games, particularly the animations and actions as exceeding their expectations. Two reviewers said the game may have too much dialogue for some younger players to be able read and comprehend while another reviewer said that younger players will still enjoy the dress-up and dance parts of the game.

Outside of Japan, Hamtaro: Ham-Hams Unite! has received generally positive reception since its release. Nintendo Power praised it for its "clever and amusing" design. GamePro and X-Play expected it to be a success among children, with GamePro calling its gameplay "oddly compelling. IGN found it to be original and engrossing for all ages, praising its visuals and animations relative to other Game Boy Color games. Eurogamer similarly praised efforts to make the game appealing to all ages while also commending Nintendo for making a game about a language barrier. Jeux Video praised the visuals and the dialogue mechanics, calling it amusing. It found the music lacking, suggesting that it and other Game Boy Color music would only appeal to a limited audience. Nintendo World Report was critical of the game, praising its aesthetic but feeling that its puzzles were illogical and gameplay nonexistent. Writer Jacob Whritenour praised it for capturing the feel of the anime it is based on.
