= Natsuki Ikezawa =

Japanese writer

Natsuki Ikezawa (池澤 夏樹, Ikezawa Natsuki; born July 7, 1945 in Obihiro, Hokkaido) is a Japanese novelist, poet, essayist, and translator. His literary work frequently explores themes concerning the relationship between civilization and nature. As a translator, Ikezawa has translated a diverse range of literature into Japanese, spanning contemporary Greek poetry, modern world fiction, and American literature. He is the father of voice actress Haruna Ikezawa.

== Bibliography ==
English translations

- Still Lives (tr. Dennis Keene, Tokyo: Kodansha International, 1997)
- A burden of flowers (tr. Alfred Birnbaum, Tokyo: Kodansha International, 2001)
- On a Small Bridge in Iraq (tr. Alfred Birnbaum, Okinawa: Impala, 2003)
- The Navidad Incident: The Downfall of Matías Guili (Haikasoru/VIZ Media, 2012), translation of Masiasu Giri no shikkyaku (マシアス・ギリの失脚) (1993)
- Mariko/Mariquita (tr. Alfred Birnbaum, Norwich: Strangers Press, 2017)
