= Hamtaro: Ham-Ham Heartbreak =

2002 video game

- Developer: Pax Softnica
- Publisher: Nintendo
- Director: Mariko Yumoto
- Producers: Shigeru Miyamoto; Kenji Miki; Masahiro Tatemoto
- Writer: Ritsuko Kawai
- Composer: Satoko Yokota
- Platform: Game Boy Advance
- Release: JP: May 31, 2002; NA: April 7, 2003; AU: May 30, 2003; EU: June 27, 2003
- Genre: Adventure
- Mode: Single player

Hamtaro: Ham-Ham Heartbreak (Note: Known in Japan as Tottoko Hamutaro 3: Love Love Daibōken Dechu (Japanese: とっとこハム太郎3 ラブラブ大冒険でちゅ)) is a 2002 video game in the Hamtaro game series for Game Boy Advance developed by Pax Softnica and published by Nintendo, as the sequel to Tottoko Hamutaro: Tomodachi Daisakusen Dechu and Hamtaro: Ham-Hams Unite!. It was the second Hamtaro game released in America and Europe, but the third released in Japan. It was released in Japan on May 31, 2002, in North America on April 7, 2003, in Australia on May 30, 2003, and in Europe on June 27, 2003. Hamtaro: Ham-Ham Heartbreak was followed by Hamtaro: Rainbow Rescue.

Like its predecessors, Hamtaro: Ham-Ham Heartbreak is an adventure game. Set in the world of the Hamtaro books and anime, the player controls the hamster ("Ham-Ham", as the hamsters tend to call themselves) Hamtaro. The game expands on the gameplay of the earlier titles by adding Bijou, a friend of Hamtaro who has a crush on him, as a partner. Together, they have to save the other hamsters' relationships from Spat, an evil hamster with a hatred for any kind of relation.

== Synopsis ==
=== Storyline ===
At the start of the game, Hamtaro is having a nightmare. Spat, a hamster dressed in a black devil costume holding a trident, is destroying the relations of various hamsters. Then, Spat notices Hamtaro and attempts to attack him. Hamtaro is awakened by Boss, to whom he tells his dream. Hamtaro later finds Bijou, and the two of them must stop Spat and fix the problems he has made.

=== Characters ===
Being of the Hamtaro franchise, Hamtaro: Ham-Ham Heartbreak features many characters (hamster anthropomorphs) also seen in the books and anime. Many of them need help, like Pashmina and Penelope, but some, like Boss and Snoozer, also offer help. Apart from the main cast, the game also features several new Ham-Hams only seen in it, including the antagonist, Spat, and his opponent, Harmony. However, hamsters aren't the only characters in the game as it features other animals as well.

=== Setting ===
The game takes place in the "normal world". However, because hamsters are quite small, the world appears to be bigger. Sunflowers, grass, acorns and human toys all are larger than they would've been from a human perspective.

== Gameplay ==
The goals in Hamtaro: Ham-Ham Heartbreak are to defeat Spat once and for all and to repair all the destroyed relations. A third quest, that supports those two, is to obtain all the "Ham-Chats". Ham-Chats are words, but also much more than that. At the start of the game, Hamtaro accidentally causes almost all the Ham-Chats in his Ham-Ham Dictionary to vanish, starting the hunt to fill the dictionary. Each Ham-Chat represents both a word (for communicating) and an action and/or motion. For instance, Lookie means to look. It is one of the most common Ham-Chats in the game, and solely has an action function. In that sense, action Ham-Chats often come with the necessary item (which is part of the Ham-Chat motion and doesn't show up in the inventory) and therefore, go another way than other adventure games in which the player already has all the actions available, but still has to get the required items. The other kind of Ham-Chat can only be used in conversations. A Ham-Chat like Perksie (Listen) for instance, only has value for conversations. New Ham-Chats are necessary to gain access to new parts of a conversation and get another Ham-Ham to do or give something.

Apart from Ham-Chats, the player also is required to obtain items (like a more conventional adventure game), though most of them are merely needed to complete minigames/side-quest. They are divided in inventory items, songs, currency and gems. Inventory items function like they do in any other adventure game and need to be combined with the Ham-Chats in order to proceed.

As in its predecessor, Ham-Hams Unite, this game allows you to put together the actions for Ham-Chat words to create dances, with a room just for this purpose in the Clubhouse. In Ham-Ham Heartbreak, however, there is an additional feature relating to "Ham-Jams."

You can pick up a variety of items such as sunflower seeds on the ground by selecting hif-hif or digging for them with digdig. Rocks can also be found in this game, but they serve a different purpose in Heartbreak. You can take the rocks and polish them in the RubRub Room in order to uncover gems.

== Reception ==
Reception

Aggregate score
Aggregator	Score
Metacritic	72/100

Review scores
Publication	Score
Eurogamer	8/10
Famitsu	8/10, 7/10, 7/10, 7/10
IGN	8/10
Nintendo Power	3.8/5
Nintendo World Report	5/10

Hamtaro: Ham-Ham Heartbreak received "average" reviews according to the review aggregation website Metacritic. It was praised for reflecting the personality and wit of the show, but was criticized for being a bit repetitive.
