= Volleyball (video game) =

1986 video game

- North American NES box art
- Developers: Nintendo R&D4; Pax Softnica
- Publisher: Nintendo
- Director: Hiroaki Hontani
- Producer: Shigeru Miyamoto
- Composer: Koji Kondo
- Platforms: Famicom Disk System, NES, arcade
- Release: Famicom Disk System: JP: July 21, 1986; NES: NA: March 1987; EU: November 15, 1987
- Genre: Sports (volleyball)
- Modes: Single-player, multiplayer
- Arcade system: PlayChoice-10

Volleyball (Note: Japanese: バレーボール, Hepburn: Barēbōru) is a 1986 volleyball video game developed by Nintendo and Pax Softnica and published by Nintendo for the Family Computer Disk System. It was ported to the Nintendo Entertainment System and released in North America and Europe in 1987. It is a remake of Pax Softnica's previous MSX game Attack Four.

It was later re-released for the Wii's Virtual Console in Europe and North America in August 2007 as well as on Nintendo Classics in June 2018.

== Gameplay ==
Volleyball is a sports video game that follows the rules of volleyball. The player controls a team of six players, three at the net and three in back. The player serves the ball into play by pressing the same button twice.

The game is a six player-a-side volleyball simulation. Players can select teams to compete in either a men's or women's competition from the following countries: United States, Japan, China, Korea, Brazil, Soviet Union, Cuba, and Tunisia.

== Development ==
Volleyball is a remake of Attack Four, a volleyball game developed and published by Pax Softnica for MSX in 1984 only in Japan. It was developed primarily by Hiroaki Hontani, a programmer contracted by Pax Softnica who nevertheless worked closely with the company. A co-worker brought the game to Nintendo's attention; Nintendo approved a proposal to remake the game to the Famicom Disk System in a rare co-development deal. Hontani was assigned to be director of the remake, working closely with Nintendo R&D4 and producer Shigeru Miyamoto, where development outside of programming was completed. Hontani was left uncredited in favor of Tomoshige Hashihita, president of Pax Softnica who was also involved in the project. Hontani would work on Ice Hockey as a programmer before departing Pax Softnica.

Hashihata would later claim sole credit for the game's development as well as ownership over Attack Four after Pax Softnica's dissolution; Nintendo also retained rights to the remake, having never been notified of the original title's copyright status. The original game was re-released physically by Japanese distributor Habit Soft in 2024 after resolution of copyright disputes.

== Reception ==
Christopher Michael Baker of AllGame rated the game two out of five and said that it showed the developer's inexperience at creating volleyball games. He could not figure out which character he controlled at any given point nor the ball's location as poorly anticipated by its shadow. He criticized the "annoying" sound effects. He said that Nintendo had made games for all other sports and likely was obliged to make a volleyball game. He ultimately recommended Kings of the Beach and Super Spike V'Ball instead.

Lucas M. Thomas of IGN called the game Nintendo's worst sports game, worse than even NES Soccer; he harshly criticized the annoying controls.
