= Hamtaro: Rainbow Rescue =

2003 video game

- European version cover art
- Developers: AlphaDream; Graphic Research
- Publisher: Nintendo
- Directors: Chihiro Fujioka; Takahiro Murakami
- Producers: Shigeru Miyamoto; Kenji Miki; Tetsuo Mizuno
- Writers: Jun Iwasaki; Hiroshi Kikuchi; Masumi Miyano; Takeshi Hiraga
- Composers: Kiyomi Tanaka; Rie Kaneko
- Platform: Game Boy Advance
- Release: JP: May 23, 2003; EU: October 29, 2004
- Genre: Adventure
- Mode: Single player

Hamtaro: Rainbow Rescue (Note: known in Japan as Tottoko Hamtaro 4: Nijiiro Daikoushin Dechu (とっとこハム太郎4 にじいろ大行進でちゅ)) is an adventure video game developed by AlphaDream for Game Boy Advance. It was released by Nintendo in Japan and PAL regions, and was set to be released in North America, but was cancelled. It is based on the Hamtaro series by Ritsuko Kawai.

== Gameplay and premise ==
Hamtaro: Rainbow Rescue stars Hamtaro, Bijou, and other hamsters. Bijou witnesses a rainbow, which disappears as a Prince named Bo falls to the ground. The Prince states that he can make rainbows by using his umbrella, but discovers that his umbrella has lost its power due to losing its colors. Hamtaro goes to collect things of the proper color for Bo to use to power his umbrella and make the rainbow reappear. Certain minigames are needed to reach the colors, and players must have certain Ham-Hams in their party in order to play them. There are more than 100 minigames in Rainbow Rescue.

== Development ==
Hamtaro: Rainbow Rescue was revealed at E3 2003. It was later shown at the 2003 Leipzig Games Convention. It was released on May 23, 2003 in Japan and October 29, 2004 in Europe. The European release was delayed to allow Hamtaro: Ham-Ham Games to coincide with the 2004 Summer Olympics. The European release received limited distribution due to a lack of interest. It had a release date for North American audiences of July 4, 2004. It was delayed to a release date of early 2005. Its American release was eventually cancelled.

== Reception ==
Hamtaro: Rainbow Rescue has received generally positive reception, holding a 77.95% aggregate score on GameRankings. It received an average rating of 30 out of 40 from Famitsu, and was in its Silver Hall of Fame. Nintendo World Report felt that the addition of minigames was a welcome one for the Hamtaro series. They suggested that it and Ham-Ham Games served as good opportunities to test minigame ideas for the Mario & Luigi series. Writer Adam Riley found it "surprisingly fun," praising AlphaDream for undertaking a strange concept for a game and for its "bright, bold and pretty" visuals. Jeux Video felt that its design would appeal to people who enjoy cute things. They felt the game would appeal to children well, but also felt that the minigames were too basic.
