= Ritsuko Kawai =

Japanese manga artist (born 1964)

- Born: March 3, 1964 (age 62); Toyonaka, Osaka, Japan
- Occupations: Manga artist, writer
- Known for: Hamtaro

Ritsuko Kawai (河井 リツ子, Kawai Ritsuko; born March 3, 1964) is a Japanese manga artist known as the creator of the Hamtaro franchise.

== Career ==
=== Hamtaro ===
Kawai originally created Hamtaro as storybooks for children first published in 1997 and adapted into an anime television series in Japan in July 2000.

Hamtaro is about a little hamster and his friends. Hamtaro gained great popularity and was made into an anime series and a line of merchandising.

Kawai has said the message that Hamtaro promoted is non-violence, teamwork, cooperation and sharing.

Hamtaro have also been made into video games for Nintendo.

=== Other works ===
Other than Hamtaro, Ritsuko Kawai has created other shōjo manga, serialized in Ciao magazine.
