= Hamtaro =

Japanese manga series and its franchise

- Cover of the first book featuring the titular protagonist, Hamtaro

とっとこハム太郎 (Tottoko Hamutarō)
- Genre: Adventure
- Manga
- Written by: Ritsuko Kawai
- Published by: Shogakukan
- Magazine: Shogakukan Learning Magazine
- Original run: 1997 – 2000
- Volumes: 3
Further information
Original video animation
Directed by	Tomomi Mochizuki
Produced by	Kazuhiko Kurokawa; Tadahito Matsumoto
Written by	Tomomi Mochizuki
Music by	Motoyoshi Iwasaki
Studio	TMS-Kyokuichi
Released	15 September 1999
Anime television series
Directed by	Osamu Nabeshima
Written by	Shinzo Fujita; Yoshiyuki Suga; Miho Maruo; Atsuhiro Tomioka; Fumihiko Shimo; Koji Miura; Toshiyasu Nagata; Michiru Shimada
Music by	Motoyoshi Iwasaki (JP); Tom Keenlyside; John Mitchell; David Iris (U.S.)
Studio	TMS Entertainment
Licensed by	CA: Alliance Atlantis; NA: Viz Media
Original network	TXN (TV Tokyo)
English network	AU: Network Ten, Cartoon Network; CA: YTV; HK: TVB; NZ: TV3; PH: GMA Network, TV5; UK: Fox Kids; US: Cartoon Network (Toonami)
Original run	7 July 2000 – 31 March 2006
Episodes	296 (Japanese); 105 (English)
Original video animation
Directed by	Osamu Nabeshima (1, 4); Kazuhiro Ochi (2, 3)
Written by	Michiru Shimada (1); Tomoko Konparu (2); Kouji Miura (3, 4)
Music by	Motoyoshi Iwasaki
Studio	TMS Entertainment
Released	6 August 2001 – 6 August 2004
Episodes	4
Anime film series
Directed by	Osamu Dezaki
Produced by	Masato Matsumoto; Yuoh Sekita
Written by	Osamu Dezaki (1); Michiru Shimada (1, 2); Tomoko Konparu (3, 4)
Music by	Motoyoshi Iwasaki
Studio	TMS Entertainment
Released	15 December 2001 – 23 December 2004
Runtime	50 minutes each
Films	4
Anime television series
Trotting Hamtaro Hai!
Directed by	Osamu Nabeshima
Written by	Yoshiyuki Suga
Music by	Motoyoshi Iwasaki
Studio	TMS Entertainment
Original network	TXN (TV Tokyo)
Original run	5 April 2006 – 26 March 2008
Episodes	77
Anime television series
Trotting Hamtaro Dechu!
Directed by	Osamu Nabeshima
Studio	TMS Entertainment
Original network	TXN (TV Tokyo)
Original run	2 April 2011 – 30 March 2013
Episodes	103
- icon

Hamtaro, known in Japan as Trotting Hamtaro (とっとこハム太郎, Tottoko Hamutarō), is a Japanese multimedia franchise created and illustrated by Ritsuko Kawai. It was first published as a manga in Shogakukan's Shōgaku Ninensei (lit. 'Second Grade') magazine in April 1997. Hamtaro was later serialized in other magazines, including Ciao. It focuses on a hamster named Hamtaro, who has a variety of adventures with other hamsters known as the "Ham-Hams" ("Hamuchans" in the Japanese version). Viz Media published the Hamtaro books in English.

Multiple anime adaptations aired on TV Tokyo and were produced by TMS Entertainment. The first anime was dubbed in English by The Ocean Group.

== Plot ==
The series revolves around a hamster named Hamtaro who is owned by a young girl named Laura Haruna (known as Hiroko Haruna in the original Japanese version). Curious, he ventures out each day to make friends and go on adventures with a clan of fellow hamster friends known as The Ham-Hams. They meet in an underground gathering hangout called the Ham-Ham Clubhouse built by Boss with the help of the other hamsters.

== Media ==
=== Manga ===
There are three manga about Hamtaro, A Home for Hamtaro, Hamtaro Gets Lost, and Jealous Hamtaro. In the first two, Hamtaro's owner is named Yukari while in the latter, her name is Amy.

=== Anime ===
In Japan, Hamtaro aired three anime television series as well as released four films, several specials, video game/DVD releases, and merchandise. By 2002, the franchise had generated $2.5 billion in merchandise sales. The success was not paralleled in the United States, however, with only the first series, some special episodes, three video games (though two others were released in Europe), and limited merchandise. On 23 February 2011, it was announced that Hamtaro received a series titled Hamtaro Dechu!.

=== Games ===
The Hamtaro franchise has multiple video game titles with independent storylines. They include adventure and educational games released for PC, Game Boy Color, Game Boy Advance (GBA), and the Nintendo DS consoles.

Title	Platform	Release date
Tottoko Hamtaro: Tomodachi Daisakusen Dechu	Game Boy Color	JP: 8 September 2000
Hamtaro: Ham-Hams Unite!	Game Boy Color	JP: 21 April 2001; NA: 28 October 2002
Hamtaro: Ham-Ham Heartbreak	Game Boy Advance	JP: 3 May 2002; NA: 7 April 2003
Hamtaro: Wake Up Snoozer!	PC/Mac	1 October 2003
Hamtaro: Rainbow Rescue	Game Boy Advance	22 May 2003
Hamtaro: Ham-Ham Games	Game Boy Advance	26 July 2004
Tottoko Hamtaro: Nazo Nazo Q Kumonoue no ? Jou	Nintendo DS	1 December 2005
Hi Hamtaro! Ham-Ham Training	Nintendo DS	JP: 15 March 2007 NA: 23 September 2008
Hi Hamtaro! Little Hamsters Big Adventures	iOS	12 April 2011

== In popular culture ==
On 26 July 2020, a group of more than 2,000 protesters in Bangkok called the Free Youth Movement led a protest against the government of Thailand which involved singing the theme song for Hamtaro with modified lyrics to say "The most delicious food is taxpayers' money. [...]Dissolve the parliament! Dissolve the parliament! Dissolve the parliament!" Other student protests during the same week continued to use Hamtaro as a symbol for the government's "feasting on taxpayer's money", and have involved groups running in circles, as if in hamster wheels, while singing the modified version of the jingle.

== Reception ==
According to Sean Atkins of Cartoon Network, the anime is targeted towards audiences aged 5 to 11. In TV Asahi's poll of the Top 100 Anime, Hamtaro came in 68th.
