= Kobori =

Kobori (written: 小堀, lit. "small moat") is a Japanese surname. Notable people with the surname include:

- Kobori Masakazu (小堀 政一, 1579–1647), Japanese artist and aristocrat
- Momoko Kobori (小堀 桃子, born 1998), Japanese tennis player
- Takayuki Kobori (小堀 恭之, born 1969), Japanese ice hockey player
- Waka Kobori (小堀 倭加, born 2000), Japanese swimmer
- Yuki Kobori (小堀 勇氣, born 1993), Japanese swimmer
- Yurie Kobori (小堀 友里絵), Japanese voice actress
- Yusuke Kobori (小堀 佑介, born 1981), Japanese boxer

== See also ==
- 7238 Kobori, a main-belt asteroid
