= List of World Trigger characters =

Characters in the action sci-fi manga and anime,

The article is a list of characters that appear in the action sci-fi manga and anime World Trigger by Daisuke Ashihara.

== Main characters ==
Yūma Kuga (空閑 遊真, Kuga Yūma)
Voiced by: Junko Minagawa (vomic), Tomo Muranaka (anime) (Japanese); Cathy Weseluck (English)
A humanoid Neighbor from the Neighborhood, who is laid-back and unknowledgeable of Japanese customs. When he was 11 years old, he and his father Yūgo Kuga (空閑 有吾, Kuga Yūgo) were involved in a war in the Neighborhood and lent their power to Raymond, an old friend of Yūgo's. Yūma disobeyed Yūgo, who had told him not to follow him, by sneaking into battle, causing him to be severely injured. Yūgo sacrificed himself to create a Black Trigger (黒(ブラック) トリガー, Burakku Torigā) to prolong Yūma's life, sealing his dying body in a ring that also holds the Black Trigger. His guardian, Replica, told him to go to the human world to see if Border could find a cure for his condition; however, he wants to bring Yūgo back by removing the Black Trigger from his body, even though it is keeping him alive. He eventually officially joins Border as a C-Rank attacker in Tamakoma-2. In the anime, he is known as the "C-Rank White Devil" (C級の白い悪魔, C-kyū no Shiroi Akuma), and the Kōda Squad calls him the "White Nightmare" because of his white hair and ferocity in battle. In Season 2, Ōji gives him the nickname of "Cougar". He is a Speed Based Attacker that uses Scorpion to fight in Rank Wars. After receiving the Black Trigger, he inherited a Side Effect which enables him to determine when a person is lying.
Osamu Mikumo (三雲 修, Mikumo Osamu)
Voiced by: Ryōta Ōsaka (vomic), Yūki Kaji (anime) (Japanese); Brian Doe (English)
A 15-year-old boy and a Border agent with low Trion level, who befriends Yūma after he transfers to his school and rescues him from a Neighbor attack. He is later promoted into B-Rank Border and becomes a Shooter and the leader of Tamakoma-2 (玉狛第二, Tamakoma Dai-ni), also known as Mikumo Squad (三雲隊, Mikumo-tai); he is usually referred as "Four Eyes" by those outside Tamakoma-2. He becomes Chika's protector after her older brother and his tutor mysteriously disappeared and joins Border to be better able to protect her, but the examiner instead suggests that he become an Engineer or Operator due to his low Trion. Unable to accept this, he tries to infiltrate Border's headquarters and negotiate with them, but after Jin saves him from a Bamster, he convinces Border to accept Osamu as a C-Rank trainee.
Chika Amatori (雨取 千佳, Amatori Chika)
Voiced by: Nao Tamura (anime) (Japanese); Caitlyn Bairstow (English)
A 14-year-old girl with abnormally high Trion levels, which "attracts" Trion Soldiers towards her, and who joined Border as a C-Rank Sniper in Tamakoma-2 seeking to save her brother Rinji and her friend after Neighbors captured them. She purposely distances herself from others out of fear that those close to her will be hurt. She has two side effects, one that allows her to sense the presence of approaching enemies, and one that hides her presence. Izumi refers to her as "Tamakoma's Trion Monster" (玉狛のトリオン怪獣(モンスター), Tamakoma no Torion Monsutā), due to her huge amount of Trion, andin Season 2, she becomes known as "Tamakoma's Cannon".
Yūichi Jin (迅 悠一, Jin Yūichi)
Voiced by: Toshiki Masuda (vomic), Yūichi Nakamura (anime) (Japanese); Andrew Francis (English)
A 19-year-old man and an A-Rank Solo Attacker, who was originally S-Rank, at Border who possesses the ability to see the future as a result of his Side Effect. He is a self-proclaimed "Talented Elite", and is skilled at formulating strategies in battle. Although his mother was killed by the Neighbors, he does not hate them because he has been to the Neighbor World and knows that they are not all evil. He invited Yūma to join Border, and like Yūgo, his mentor Sōichi Mogami (最上 宗一, Mogami Sōichi) sacrificed himself to create a Black Trigger, which Yūichi competed for, and later gave it away so Yūma could officially join Border and Headquarters could recognize him as a Border agent.
Replica (レプリカ, Repurika)
Voiced by: Yūichi Iguchi (vomic), Hideyuki Tanaka (anime) (Japanese); Marco Soriano (English)
Yūma's guardian, whom Yūgo created to protect and teach him and has information about the countries he and Yūma visited. They told Yūma to go to the human world to see if Border could find a cure for his condition. After telling Osamu Yūma's story, they ask him to give him a new goal. Near the end of Aftokrator's invasion, Replica is severely damaged and Osamu throws them into Aftokrator's away ship and activates the emergency launch command. While this saves Osamu and Chika, Replica is unable to escape the ship. It is currently unknown if they survived.

== Border ==
=== Tamakoma Branch ===
Tamakoma Branch (玉狛支部, Tamakoma-shibu) is a faction of Border which believes Neighbors and humans can be friends and takes a more diplomatic approach to them. Director Rindō brought back various triggers from the neighborhood, which were analyzed by engineers and were created triggers made specifically for Tamakoma-1

Takumi Rindō (林藤 匠, Rindō Takumi)
Voiced by: Keiji Fujiwara (season 1), Kenjiro Tsuda (season 2–present) (Japanese); Marco Soriano (English)
The branch chief of Tamakoma Branch who has learned from past experience that not all Neighbors are enemies of humans and wants to befriend those who are good. He was a student of Yūgo, who guided and trained him when he was a newcomer to Border. Because of this, he feels indebted to Yūgo and wants to give Yūma the same treatment Yūgo gave him. He wants Yūma to join the Tamakoma branch, but Yūma initially refuses, later accepting to join as part of Tamakoma-2.

=== Tamakoma-1 ===
Tamakoma-1 (玉狛第一, Tamakoma Dai-ichi) is a Team described as being Border's strongest team. They are prohibited to participate in Border's Rank Wars, as some of their triggers are not approved by Headquarters. Two of its three combatants are all-rounders, while the third is an attacker.

Reiji Kizaki (木崎 レイジ, Kizaki Reiji)
Voiced by: Tomoaki Maeno (Japanese); Daegan Manns (English)
A 21-year-old man and the leader of the team, who is usually calm and serious. He is experienced as an Attacker, Gunner and Sniper, and is Chika's mentor.
Kyōsuke Karasuma (烏丸 京介, Karasuma Kyōsuke)
Voiced by: Jun Fukuyama (Japanese); Matt Ellis (English)
A 16-year-old boy who is fun-loving and cocky, but becomes serious in combat. He has mentored Osamu and Kitora.
Kirie Konami (小南 桐絵, Konami Kirie)
Voiced by: Rie Kugimiya (Japanese); Chiara Zanni (English)
A 17-year-old girl who is gullible, as she will believe almost anything people tell her, which people, particularly Jin, Karasuma, and later Yūma make fun of her for.
Shiori Usami (宇佐美 栞, Usami Shiori)
Voiced by: Eri Nakao (Japanese); Ali DeRegt (English)
A 17-year-old girl who created the "Yashamaru Series" (やしゃまるシリーズ, Yashamaru Shirīzu), a group of Marmods developed to help train agents, which Usami describes as each having a different "personality". She works as an operator for Jin, Tamakoma-1 and Tamakoma-2, and was the operator of Kazama Squad.

=== Tamakoma-2 ===
Tamakoma-2 (玉狛第二, Tamakoma Dai-ni) is a new team formed by Osamu Mikumo, its leader, Yūma Kuga, Chika Amatori and later on, Hyuse. The Squad was formed because Chika wanted to join the Away Team and search for Chika's lost brother and friend, and because Replica asked Osamu to give Yūma a new goal. Osamu originally wanted Yūma to be the team captain, but Yūma only accepted joining Tamakoma Branch on the condition that Osamu was captain. Hyuse later joins the team after being marooned on the condition that Osamu brings him back to Aftokrator. They are currently No. 2 in the B-Rank ranking.

=== Others ===
Yōtarō Rindō (林藤 陽太郎, Rindō Yōtarō)
Voiced by: Megumi Urawa (Japanese); Saffron Henderson (English)
The proclaimed son of Mr. Rindō, who is later revealed to be the prince of the fallen planet Aristera. Yotaro also has a pet capybara named Raijinmaru (雷神丸) who is revealed to be the planet's crown trigger. According to Volume 3's extras, he has the Side Effect ability to talk to animals.

== Headquarters ==
Headquarters (本部, Honbu) is Border's main branch, which is led by Masamune Kido and is the base for most of Border's teams.

Masamune Kido (城戸 正宗, Kido Masamune)
Voiced by: Takuya Kirimoto (Japanese); Gyles Merton (English)
The Leader of Border. A 42-year-old man who hates all Neighbors, and wanted to eliminate Yūma and take his Black Trigger from him. According to Shinoda, he was the one closest to Yūgo and most moved by his death, despite not showing it.
Masafumi Shinoda (忍田 真史, Shinoda Masafumi)
Voiced by: Takeshi Kusao (Japanese); Scott Roberts (English)
The General Manager and Commander of the Self-Defense Corps of Border, who is also known as Headquarters' Strongest Normal Trigger User. He is 33 years old and, like Rindō, was a student of Yūgo.
Eizō Netsuki (根付 栄蔵, Netsuki Eizō)
Voiced by: Bin Shimada (Japanese); Hans Wackershauser (English)
The Public Relations Chief. A man who easily panics and is prone to nervous outbursts and easily panics.
Motokichi Kinuta (鬼怒田 本吉, Kinuta Motokichi)
Voiced by: Kōzō Shioya (Japanese); Michael Dobson (English)
The Headquarters Research and Development Chief. A 48-year-old man who has a short temper, but cares deeply for children, and is said to have a daughter.
Katsumi Karasawa (唐沢 克己, Karasawa Katsumi)
Voiced by: Eiji Takemoto (Japanese); Stewart Cummings (English)
The External Affairs and Business Manager. A 33-year-old man who is calm and prefers to listen to others and believes that it is possible to negotiate with anyone as long as you know what they want.
Kyōko Sawamura (沢村 響子, Sawamura Kyōko)
Voiced by: Hōko Kuwashima (Japanese); Carol-Anne Day (English)
Shinoda's subordinate and Border's Assistant Director and former Attacker. She is temperamental and annoyed by Jin's sexual harassment, and loves Shinoda.

== Border Teams ==
=== A-Rank ===
==== Tachikawa Squad ====
Tachikawa Squad (太刀川隊, Tachikawa-tai) is one of Border's strongest teams, and No. 1 in the A-Rank ranking. Their emblem is a design with a crescent moon and three sword blades, diagonally arranged parallel to each other.

Kei Tachikawa (太刀川 慶, Tachikawa Kei)
Voiced by: Daisuke Namikawa (Japanese); Michael Adamthwaite (English)
The leader of Tachikawa Squad and Masafumi Shinoda's apprentice, who is charismatic and cocky and a good strategist. He is Border's No. 1 agent, and is said to be better at true swordsmanship than Jin. He and Jin have been rivals for a long time, and he is excited when Jin returns to participating in the Rank Wars, as it means he gets to compete against him again.
Kōhei Izumi (出水 公平, Izumi Kōhei)
Voiced by: Kaito Ishikawa (Japanese); Chris Austman (English)
A member of Tachikawa Squad and a reckless Shooter who thinks blowing things up is the best option, which has earned him the nickname "bullet idiot" from Yōsuke Yoneya. He tends to combine his bullets into stronger ones.
Takeru Yuiga (唯我 尊, Yuiga Takeru)
Voiced by: Tetsuya Kakihara (Japanese); Cole Howard (English)
A member of Tachikawa Squad and a Gunner. He is the son of Border's biggest sponsor and is narcissistic. Despite having requested to be placed in an A-Rank Squad, which led to Masamune Kido placing him in the Tachikawa Squad, he lacks the skills needed to be an A-Rank agent.
Yuu Kunichika (国近 柚宇, Kunichika Yuu)
Voiced by: Umeka Shoji (Japanese); Saffron Henderson (English)
Tachikawa Squad's operator, who likes to play video games with her teammates Izumi and Tachikawa.

==== Fuyushima Squad ====
Fuyushima Squad (冬島隊, Fuyushima-tai) is team No. 2 in the A-Rank ranking. Their emblem is a knight chess piece with unicorn horn.

Shinji Fuyushima (冬島 慎次, Fuyushima Shinji)
Voiced by: Ryōtarō Okiayu (Japanese); James Kirk (English)
The captain of Fuyushima Squad and a Trapper. He did not participate in the raid to take Yūma's black trigger, which Tōma states is because he had sea-sickness.
Isami Tōma (当真 勇, Tōma Isami)
Voiced by: Mitsuo Iwata (Japanese); Bill Newton (English)
A Sniper and the No. 1 Sniper of Border, who was Azuma's student. He is arrogant and likes teasing Narasaka, the No.# 02 Sniper, but is friendly and able to recognize strong opponents.

==== Kazama Squad ====
Kazama Squad (風間隊, Kazama-tai) is team No. 3 in the A-Rank ranking, who rose in the A-Rank ranking thanks to Kikuchihara's side effect. Their emblem is a crossed-out eye.

Sōya Kazama (風間 蒼也, Kazama Sōya)
Voiced by: Hikaru Midorikawa (Japanese); Vincent Tong (English)
The leader of Kazama Squad. A 21-year-old Attacker who is serious and stoic.
Ryō Utagawa (歌川 遼, Utagawa Ryō)
Voiced by: Hiroaki Miura (Japanese); Josh Friesen (English)
An All-Rounder from Kazama Squad. Unlike the stoic Kazama and the foul-mouthed Kikuchihara, he is gentle and friendly.
Shirō Kikuchihara (菊地原 士郎, Kikuchihara Shirō)
Voiced by: Hisayoshi Suganuma (Japanese); Zach LeBlanc (English)
An Attacker from Kazama Squad. He is a foul-mouthed young boy with little respect for those he considers weak and even his teammates, and seems to consider himself more important than he really is. However, he values his "friends and buddies".
Kaho Mikami (三上 歌歩, Mikami Kaho)
Voiced by: Machiko Toyoshima (Japanese); Calista Schmidt (English)
The second operator of Kazama Squad after Usam.

==== Kusakabe Squad ====
Kusakabe Squad (草壁隊, Kusakabe-tai) is team No. 4 in the A-Rank ranking. Their emblem is a dragon-headed rooster, with a design resembling a laurel wreath behind it.

Saki Kusakabe (草壁 早紀, Kusakabe Saki)
The Operator and Leader of Kusakabe Squad.
Shun Midorikawa (緑川 駿, Midorikawa Shun)
Voiced by: Yukiko Morishita (Japanese); Nick Wolfhard (English)
A 14-year-old boy and an Attacker of Kusakabe Squad. He is a prodigy, having reached A-Rank at a young age and managing to defeat a Neighbor simulation in four seconds on his first attempt. He is shown to be arrogant and enjoying showing off until Yūma humbles him after attempting to humiliate Osamu, who he was jealous of for being recruited into Tamakoma.
Ryūji Saeki (佐伯 竜司, Saeki Ryūji)
An All-rounder and member of Kusakabe Squad.
Kazuma Satomi (里見 一馬, Satomi Kazuma)
The No. 1 Gunner and Member of Kusakabe Squad.
Hayato Uno (宇野 隼人, Uno Hayato)
A Sniper and member of Kusakabe Squad.

==== Arashiyama Squad ====
Arashiyama Squad (嵐山隊, Arashiyama-tai) is team No. 5 in the A-Rank ranking. They are known as "the face of Border" due to their frequent appearances in Border propaganda and promotional materials. Because they spend much of their time promoting Border, many people mistakenly believe that they are inferior to the other A-rank teams. Their emblem is a design of five black pentagons with a white star symbol inside each, arranged to form another star symbol.

Jun Arashiyama (嵐山 准, Arashiyama Jun)
Voiced by: Nobuhiko Okamoto (Japanese); Brad Swaile (English)
The leader of Arashiyama Squad and an All-Rounder. He is fun-loving and charismatic and a loving older brother to his brother Fuku (副) and his sister Saho (佐補). He befriends Osamu and Yūma after they save the students of their school, including his siblings, and later congratulates Osamu on his promotion and Yūma for joining Border.
Ai Kitora (木虎 藍, Kitora Ai)
Voiced by: Kana Hanazawa (Japanese); Maryke Hendrikse (English)
An All-Rounder of Arashiyama Squad who considers Osamu to be her rival and seeks to be better than him. She is a child prodigy, having joined Border as an A-Rank member as a middle schooler, and is gentle and humble and willing to help those in need.
Mitsuru Tokieda (時枝 充, Tokieda Mitsuru)
Voiced by: Yūta Kasuya (Japanese); David A. Kaye (English)
An All-Rounder from Arashiyama Squad. He is calm and quiet and does not talk much unless he has something important to say.
Ken Satori (佐鳥 賢, Satori Ken)
Voiced by: Kota Nemoto (Japanese); Antony Kim (English)
The Sniper of Arashiyama Squad, who is cocky but friendly. He is the only sniper able to fire two rifles simultaneously without losing any precision.
Haruka Ayatsuji (綾辻 遥, Ayatsuji Haruka)
Voiced by: Shiori Mikami (Japanese); Michelle Molineux (English)
The Operator of Arashiyama Squad.

==== Kako Squad ====
Kako Squad (加古隊, Kako-tai) is team No. 6 in the A-Rank ranking and an all-girls team. Their emblem is composed of a butterfly with spread wings, with the uppercase letter K in place of the lower right wing's pattern.

Nozomi Kako (加古 望, Kako Nozomi)
Voiced by: Misa Watanabe (Japanese); Diana Kaarina (English)
The leader of Kako Squad and a Shooter, who enjoys battles. Jin mentions her as being a candidate for the Fūjin.
Futaba Kuroe (黒江 双葉, Kuroe Futaba)
Voiced by: Yukana
Kuroe is a Attacker of Kako Squad, who Tsutsumi mentions as a prodigy along with Kitora and Midorikawa, having defeated a Neighbor simulation in 11 seconds on her first attempt.
Mai Kitagawa (喜多川 真衣, Kitagawa Mai)
A Trapper and member of Kako Squad
An Kobayakawa (小早川 杏, Kobayakawa An)
The operator of Kako Squad

==== Miwa Squad ====
Miwa Squad (三輪隊, Miwa-tai) is team No. 7 in the A-Rank ranking. Their emblem is composed of two black snakes spiraling around a bullet.

Shūji Miwa (三輪 秀次, Miwa Shūji)
Voiced by: Masakazu Morita (Japanese); Adrian Petriw (English)
An All-Rounder and the captain of Miwa Squad, who was a member of the original Azuma Squad. He joined Border to avenge his sister after she was killed by a Neighbor, which caused him to harbor hatred towards Neighbors. His main trigger is the Asteroid, which has no special ability but is equipped with the ability Lead Bullet (鉛弾(レッドバレット), Reddo Baretto), which can bypass shields and immobilize enemies.
Yōsuke Yoneya (米屋 陽介, Yoneya Yōsuke)
Voiced by: Daisuke Kishio (Japanese); David A. Kaye (English)
An Attacker of Miwa Squad, who is fun-loving and loves a good battle. He uses the trigger Gen'yō Kogetsu. Unlike his teammates, he does not hate Neighbors, and wants to battle with Yūma just for fun.
Tōru Narasaka (奈良坂 透, Narasaka Tōru)
Voiced by: Yūsei Oda (Japanese); Will Simpson (English)
A Sniper of Miwa Squad and the No. 2 Sniper of Border, who was Azuma's student. He harbors hatred against Neighbors as a result of his house being destroyed in an invasion.
Shōhei Kodera (古寺 章平, Kodera Shōhei)
Voiced by: Yasuhiro Takato (Japanese); Bill Rawts (English)
A Sniper of Miwa Squad, who, like Narasaka, harbors hatred against Neighbors as a result of his house being destroyed in an invasion.
Ren Tsukimi (月見 蓮, Tsukimi Ren)
Voiced by: Chihiro Ikki (Japanese); Maryke Hendrikse (English)
The Operator of Miwa Squad and the operator of the original Azuma Squad, who was a childhood friend of Kei and mentored him in tactics. She was Azuma's student.

==== Katagiri Squad ====
Katagiri Squad (片桐隊, Katagiri-tai) is team No. 8 in the A-Rank ranking. Their emblem is a snowflake with a black background.

Takaaki Katagiri (片桐 隆明, Katagiri Takaaki)
The No. 3 Gunner and captain of Katagiri Squad
Yukimaru Ichijō (一条 雪丸, Ichijō Yukimaru)
An Attacker of Katagiri Squad.
Tōichirō Momozono (桃園 藤一郎, Momozono Tōichirō)
A Sniper of Katagiri Squad.
Asumi Amakura (尼倉 亜澄, Amakura Asumi)
A member of Katagiri Squad and the only Spotter in Border.
Karin Yuitsuka (結束 夏凛, Yuitsuka Karin)
The Operator of Katagiri Squad, who was the Operator for the second generation of Azuma Squad.

=== B-Rank ===
==== Ninomiya Squad ====
Ninomiya Squad (二宮隊, Ninomiya-tai) is team No. 1 in the B-Rank ranking. They were No. 4 in the A-Rank ranking, but were demoted to B-Rank due to Hatohara's defection.

Masataka Ninomiya (二宮 匡貴, Ninomiya Masataka)
Voiced by: Junichi Suwabe (Japanese); Murray Farnell (English)
The captain of Ninomiya Squad and Border's No. 1 Shooter, who was a member of the original Azuma squad. He believes only people stronger than him are worthy of respect, but can respect those he considers weaker, such as Izumi, who he requested to mentor him despite being Border's No. 1 Shooter in the past.
Sumiharu Inukai (犬飼 澄晴, Inukai Sumiharu)
A Gunner of Ninomiya Squad, who is smart and crafty and skilled at extracting information from people.
Shinnosuke Tsuji (辻 新之助, Tsuji Shinnosuke)
An Attacker of Ninomiya Squad, who is stoic and shy and struggles to talk to women, with the exception of his team's operator, Hiyami, who he got used to being around, and Hatohara, who was kind to him.
Mirai Hatohara (鳩原 未来, Hatohara Mirai)
Voiced by: Ai Maeda
Ninomiya Squad's former sniper, who wanted to be part of the Away Team to find her little brother. Her squad lost the right to join due to her being unable to shoot people despite being able to disarm them. She later teams up with civilians and gives them triggers in order to go to the Neighborhood, but vanishes afterards.

==== Kageura Squad ====
Kageura Squad (影浦隊, Kageura-tai) is team No. 3 in the B-Rank ranking, and formerly No. 6 in the A-Rank ranking, but were demoted to B-Rank due to Kageura's violent behavior.

Masato Kageura (影浦 雅人, Kageura Masato)
Voiced by: Tomokazu Sugita (Japanese); Alistair Abell (English)
The leader of the Kageura Squad, who caused it to be demoted to B-Rank due to his violent behavior. His side effect allows him to feel other's emotions and intentions as pinpricks; intense emotions to cause harm intensify the pinpricks. He forms a rivalry with Yūma following their match, and states that his side effect is useless against Yuma since he cannot detect anything from him.
Yuzuru Ema (絵馬 ユズル, Ema Yuzuru)
Voiced by: Yūko Sanpei (Japanese); Valin Shinyei (English)
The Sniper of Kageura Squad, who befriends Chika and starts training her since he does not want her to have the same fate as his master, Mirai Hatohara, who he was fond of. He also dislikes Ninomiya Squad, which he states is a feeling shared by his team. He specifically hates Ninomiya, due to the way he treats Hatohara as a traitor. He later gains a crush on Chika and seeks to join the away team to protect her.
Hiro Kitazoe (北添 尋, Kitazoe Hiro)
Voiced by: Taketora (Japanese); Michael Adamthwaite (English)
The Gunner of Kageura Squad, who is laid-back and level-headed, even in the face of defeat.
Hikari Nire (仁礼 光, Nire Hikari)
Voiced by: Yurie Kobori (Japanese); Brittney Irvin (English)
The Operator of Kageura Squad, who is carefree and spends much of her time relaxing at Border.

==== Ikoma Squad ====
Ikoma Squad (生駒隊, Ikoma-tai) is team No. 4 in the B-Rank ranking.

Tatsuhito Ikoma (生駒 達人, Ikoma Tatsuhito)
Voiced by: Katsuyuki Konishi
The No. 6 Attacker and captain of Ikoma Squad
Kōji Oki (隠岐 孝二, Oki Kōji)
Voiced by: Masamu Ono
A Sniper and member of Ikoma Squad.
Satoshi Mizukami (水上 敏志, Mizukami Satoshi)
Voiced by: Kaito Takeda
A Shooter and member of Ikoma Squad.
Kai Minamizawa (南沢 海, Minamisawa Kai)
Voiced by: Shun Horie
An Attacker and member of Ikoma Squad.
Maori Hosoi (細井 真織, Hosoi Maori)
Voiced by: Naomi Ōzora
The Operator of Ikoma Squad

==== Ōji Squad ====
Ōji Squad (王子隊, Ōji-tai) is team No. 5 in the B-Rank ranking.

Kazuaki Ōji (王子 一彰, Ōji Kazuaki)
Voiced by: Akira Ishida
An Attacker and captain of Ōji Squad, who is confident and good at formulating strategies. He gives people nicknames which are usually anglicized forms of their names, such as calling Chika Amatori Amatoriciana.
Kazuki Kurauchi (蔵内 和紀, Kurauchi Kazuki)
Voiced by: Yūsuke Handa
A Shooter and member of Ōji Squad.
Yukata Kashio (樫尾 由多嘉, Kashio Yutaka)
Voiced by: Tatsumaru Tachibana
An Attacker and member of Ōji Squad.
Haya Kittaka (橘高 羽矢, Kittaka Haya)
Voiced by: Sakura Kawaguchi
The operator of Ōji Squad.

==== Azuma Squad ====
Azuma Squad (東隊, Azuma-tai) is team No. 6 in the B-Rank ranking. The squad has changed all its members except for Azuma himself at least twice prior to its present composition.

Haruaki Azuma (東 春秋, Azuma Haruaki)
Voiced by: Kenji Hamada (Japanese); Mark Linde (English)
The captain of Azuma Squad and the first Sniper in Border, who is skilled at tactics and deciding which gun to use depending on the situation. He trained Narasaka, Tōma and Reiji, among other snipers of Border, and tutored Ren Tsukimi in tactics.
Tsuneyuki Okudera (奥寺 常幸, Okudera Tsuneyuki)
An Attacker and member of the current generation of Azuma Squad.
Noboru Koarai (小荒井 登, Koarai Noboru)
An Attacker and a member of the current generation of Azuma Squad.
Mako Hitomi (人見 摩子, Hitomi Mako)
The operator for the current generation of Azuma Squad.

==== Yuba Squad ====
Yuba Squad (弓場隊, Yuba-tai) is team No. 8 in the B-Rank ranking.

Takuma Yuba (弓場 拓磨, Yuba Takuma)
The No. 2 Gunner and captain of Yuba Squad
Yukari Obishima (帯島 ユカリ, Obishima Yukari)
An All-Rounder and member of Yuba Squad.
Kazuto Tonooka (外岡 一斗, Tonooka Kazuto)
A Sniper and member of Yuba Squad.
Nono Fujimaru (藤丸 のの, Fujimaru Nono)
The Operator for Yuba Squad.

=== Other agents ===
Izuho Natsume (夏目 出穂, Natsume Izuho)
Voiced by: Hiromi Konno (Japanese); Karen Kelly (English)
A 14 years old C-Rank Sniper who befriends Chika.
Tsukihiko Amō (天羽 月彦, Amō Tsukihiko)
Voiced by: Tsubasa Yonaga (Japanese); Adrian Petriw (English)
A 16 years old S-Rank agent and Black Trigger user, who is said to be highly destructive in battle and dislikes fighting opponents he considers to be boring.

==== Kōda Squad ====
Kōda Squad (甲田隊, Kōda-tai) are a trio of C-Rank agents who think very highly of themselves and believe that Arashiyama Squad has no real strength. As they are still C-Rank, they are not considered to be an official squad, as only A-Rank and B-Rank agents can form squads.

Teruteru Kōda (甲田 照輝, Kōda Teruteru)
Voiced by: Ryōsuke Kanemoto
The group's leader. A Shooter who uses Hound.
Fumifumi Saotome (早乙女 文史, Saotome Fumifumi)
Voiced by: Ryōhei Arai (Japanese); Zach LeBlanc (English)
A Shooter who uses Hound.
Hidehide Hinoe (丙 秀英, Hinoe Hidehide)
Voiced by: Yūsuke Handa (Japanese); Andrew Petriw (English)
An Attacker who uses Kogetsu.

== Civilians ==
Kasumi Mikumo (三雲 香澄, Mikumo Kasumi)
Voiced by: Ai Maeda (Japanese); Saffron Henderson (English)
Osamu's mother, who has been mistaken for his sister due to her young appearance despite being 39 years old. She frequently worries about her son, but allows him to continue working for Border despite the dangers the job poses.
Ichinose (一之瀬)
Voiced by: Eri Nakao (Japanese); Michelle Molineux (English)
One of Osamu and Yūma's classmates, who is friendly and smart and seems to be good friends with Futatsugi.
Futatsugi (二ツ木)
Voiced by: Yurie Kobori (Japanese); Rebecca Husain (English)
One of Osamu and Yūma's classmates, who is happy and excitable and quickly befriends Yūma and seems to be good friends with Ichinose.
Miyoshi (三好)
Voiced by: Yūsuke Handa (Japanese); Nick Wolfhard (English)
One of Osamu and Yūma's classmates who knows about Border, is a big fan of them, and wants to join them himself.
Yotsuya (四ツ谷)
Voiced by: Ryōhei Arai (Japanese); Matt Edworthy (English)
One of Osamu and Yūma's classmates, who is calm and level-headed and annoyed by Miyoshi's obsession with Border.
3 Idiots (3バカ, San Baka)
Voiced by: Mitsuo Iwata (No. 1), Kōta Nemoto (Japanese), Daegan Manns (English) (No. 2) and Hiroaki Miura (Japanese), Bill Newton (English) (No. 3)
A trio of bullies from Osamu and Yūma's classroom who initially bully them, but start fearing them after learning that Osamu is a Border agent.
Rinji Amatori (雨取 麟児, Amatori Rinji)
Voiced by: Hirofumi Nojima
Chika's older brother, who seemed to be suspicious of Border and wanted to protect her on his own. He made Osamu promise to protect Chika if something happened to him. He got a trigger from an unknown party and wanted to explore the world on the other side with them, but disappeared on the day they were supposed to travel.
Aoba Harukawa (春川 青葉, Harukawa Aoba)
Voiced by: Shiori Mikami (Japanese); Maryke Hendrikse (English)
Chika's friend, who was the only one who believed her when Neighbors started chasing her, as Border did not have a base at that time and nobody knew anything about Neighbors. She promised to protect Chika, but mysteriously disappeared soon after. Since then, Chika has become afraid to ask for help and has distanced herself from other people.

== Neighbor Worlds ==
The Neighborhood is divided into many different countries, which are "planets" that follow different orbits. Yūgo refers to these countries as "Planet States".

=== Liberi ===
Liberi (リーベリー, Rīberī) is a maritime nation surrounded by a vast sea. Its name is derived from Liberi, the Latin word for "children".

=== Leoforio ===
Leoforio (レオフォリオ, Reoforio) is a cavalry nation. Its name is derived from Leoforio (λεωφορείο leo̱forío), the Greek word for 'bus'.

=== Chion ===
Chion (キオン, Kion) is a snowy country with a harsh terrain and climate that stops enemies from attacking. Its name is derived from Chion (χιων chión) the Greek word for "snow" and the name of the Greek goddess of snow.

=== Aftokrator ===
The god's country and the largest military state. Its name is derived from Aftokrator (αυτοκράτωρ af̱tokráto̱r), the Greek word for "emperor".

Hyrein (ハイレイン, Hairein)
Voiced by: Nozomu Sasaki (Japanese); Brian Dobson (English)
Ranbanein's older brother. He is one of Aftokrator's trigger users and the commander of their invading army attacking Earth, and serves as leader during Aftokrator's invasion.. His Trigger is Alektor (卵の冠(アレクトール), Arekutōru; lit. Egg Crown), a black trigger which can create animals out of Trion and can transform any Trion body, including triggers, into Trion cubes upon contact, but does not have the same effect on physical bodies. His name is derived from Hyrein, the Greek verb for "to take", while his trigger's name Alektor (αλέκτωρ alékto̱r) is derived from the Greek word for "rooster".
Ranbanein (ランバネイン, Ranbanein)
Voiced by: Junichi Yanagita (Japanese); Brent Miller (English)
One of Aftokrator's trigger users and Hyrein's younger brother, as well as a member of their army attacking Earth. His trigger is Chelidon (雷の羽(ケリードーン), lit. Wings of Thunder), a trigger which can shapeshift into several different firearms and a jet pack. His name is derived from Ranbanein (λαμβάνειν lamvánein), the present active infinitive of the Greek verb Lamvano (λαμβάνω lambánō), "to take/receive", while his trigger's name Chelidon (χελιδόνι chelidóni) is derived from the Greek word for "swallow".
Hyuse (ヒュース, Hyūsu)
Voiced by: Nobunaga Shimazaki (Japanese); Jonathan Ostonal (English)
One of Aftokrator's trigger users and a member of their army attacking Earth, who is much younger than the other trigger users of Aftokrator. His trigger is Lampyris (蝶の盾(ランビリス), Ranbirisu; lit. Butterfly Shield), which controls small metallic shards that can be molded into shields, guns, and wings, as well as used as markers to trace marked targets. After the Aftokrator invaders are forced to end their invasion early due to the efforts of Osamu and Replica, and fail to capture Chika to make her Aftokrator's new god, he is stranded on Earth as part of Hyrein's original plan to sacrifice his master should they fail to find a suitable god, and is captured by the Tamakoma Branch. After failing to return to Aftokrator with the soldiers of Galopoula, Hyuse decides to join Tamakoma-2 in hopes of joining the expedition and returning to Aftokrator. His trigger's name Lampyris (λαμπυρίς lampyrís) is derived from the Greek word for "firefly".
Enedora (エネドラ, Enedora)
Voiced by: Toshio Furukawa (Japanese); Andrew Cownden (English)
One of Aftokrator's trigger users and a member of their invading army attacking Earth. His right eye's iris is black, which Mira states, along with his defiant personality, was caused by his trigger Vorvoros (泥の王(ボルボロス), lit. King of Mud), which gives him the ability to liquefy and gasify to attack. Moira kills him to recover Vorvoros, but his horns, which retain his memories and personality due to being rooted to his brain, are implanted in a Rad, which becomes black, reviving him. His name is derived from Enedora (ενέδρα enédra), the Greek word for "ambush", while his trigger's name Vorvoros (βορβορος vórvoros) is derived from Greek word for "mud".
Viza (ヴィザ)
Voiced by: Hiroshi Naka (Japanese); Alec Willows (English)
One of Aftokrator's trigger users and a commander of their invading army attacking Earth. His trigger is Organon (星の杖(オルガノン), Oruganon; lit. Staff of Stars), a black trigger which creates sword-like wheels. Yūma ultimately defeats him, a feat which impresses both Hyrein and Mira. His trigger's name Organon (Ὄργανον Órganon) is derived from the Greek word for "instrument" or "tool" .
Mira (ミラ)
Voiced by: Yurie Kobori (Japanese); Marlie Collins (English)
One of Aftokrator's trigger users and a member of their invading army attacking Earth, who serves as the group's support. Her trigger is Speiraskia (窓の影(スピラスキア), Supirasukia; lit. Shadow of the Window), a black trigger which can create portals which use more or less Trion depending on the size, and can also be transformed into spikes. Because of a political alliance between her and Hyrein's family, she is slated to either marry him or Ranbanein. Her name is derived from Mira (μοίρα, moíra), the Greek word for "fate", while her trigger's name Speiraskia is a combination of the Greek words speira (σπείρα speíra, spiral) and skia (σκια skia, shadow) which means "spiralling shadow".

=== Calvaria ===
Calvaria (カルワリア, karuwaria) is the fortress nation which Yūgo and Yūma supported because Raymond was an old friend of Yūgo's. Its name is derived from Calvaria, the Latin name for Calvary, where Jesus was crucified. The citizens' names come from characters of Doraemon, a series which Ashihara is a fan of and was one of the inspirations for World Trigger.

Raymond (ライモンド, Raimondo)
Voiced by: Yasunori Masutani
The self-defense leader of Calvaria and a close friend of Yūgo. He is named after Doraemon.
Izukacha (イズカチャ)
Voiced by: Kozue Kamada
Raymond's daughter and Vittarno's older sister. She is named after Shizuka Minamoto.
Vittarno (ヴィッターノ, Vittāno)
Voiced by: Yōko Teppōzuka
Raymond's son and Izukacha's younger brother. He is named after Nobita Nobi.

=== Spinthir ===
Spinthir (スピンテール, Spintēru) is a border nation that attacked the country of Calvaria and hired assassins to support their trigger users during an attack in Calvaria. Its name is derived from Spinthir (σπινθήρ, spinthí̱r), the Greek word for "spark".

Mysterious Assassin
A shadowy figure who targeted trigger users of Calvaria during Spinthir's invasion and was responsible for killing Yūma until Yūgo sacrificed himself to create the black trigger to rebive him.

=== Trion Soldiers ===
Trion Soldiers (トリオン兵, Torion Hei) are automated robotic soldiers developed for different purposes, ranging from surveillance to human/trion harvesting and combat.

Bamster (バムスター, Bamusutā)
Giant quadrupedal worm-like beasts who have body armor.
Marmod (モールモッド, Mōrumoddo)
Insectoid trion soldiers that have the hardest blades out of the Neighbor monsters. Built for melee combat, they are agile and come in swarms.
Ilgar (イルガー, Irugā)
Flying soldiers who are used for bombardment and become more dangerous if critically damaged.
Rad
The spy units of Trion Soldiers who can create gateways by gathering trion of passersby. They resemble a cross between a spider and a crab and are silver and white in color, with a red-orange eye-like aperture on its front and on its back.
Bander (バンダー, Bandā)
Giant worm-like creatures tasked with capturing humans for the other world nations. Despite being built for combat, they are capable of defense and can fire ranged attacks from its mouth.
Bado (バド)
A Trion Soldier resembling a tadpole shrimp.
Rabbit/Rabit (Viz) (ラビット, Rabitto)
Humanoid trion soldiers designed to capture trigger users, who are first seen during the invasion of the city. They are white with rabbit-like ears that serve as radar sensors. In their stomachs are claws for catching which curl back into the chest cavity to form a makeshift cage. On their heads are eyes that can also shoot ranged attacks. They also have heavy armor.
Dog (ドグ, Dogu)
One of the two types of trion soldiers Rhodokhroun gives to Galopoula, who resemble dogs and commonly fight in packs. They are also used as surveillance.
Idra (アイドラ, Aidora)
One of the two types of trion soldiers Rhodokhroun gives to Galopoula. It is humanoid and specializes in group combat.
