= List of Tweeny Witches characters =

The Tweeny Witches anime series features an extensive cast of fictional characters created by Studio 4°C. The story is set in a fictional universe in which witches, warlocks, and fairies live.

The story follows the adventures of three apprentice witches named Arusu, Sheila, and Eva. When Arusu releases all of the fairies, the grand master punishes Sheila and Eva for their failure to keep Arusu under control.^{ep.2}^{ep.2}

== Magical Girl Squad ==
=== Arusu ===
Voiced by: Sachiko Kojima (Japanese); Julie Maddalena (English)

Arusu (アルス, Arusu) is the main protagonist of the series. She is a cheerful and supportive person. A bit of a tomboy, she means to do well and is not disheartened when others put her down, instead she encourages them. Arusu loves magic (as well as sweet chestnuts)^{ep.2}^{ep.2} and believes it should only be used to make people happy. Her father, Jidan, gave her the True Book of Spells for her 5th birthday and was the one who taught her that magic should only be used for happiness and never destruction. At the beginning of the season, Lennon and the book brought her to the Magical Realm when she accidentally fell off the top of the school.^{ep.1} Despite being a human, she was able to learn magic fairly quickly and is better than some of the native witches in the Magical Realm. She is the one who set all of the fairies free and caused Eva and Sheila to be cursed. ^{ep.2}^{ep.2} In the end, she decided to go back to the Human Realm with the help of one of the interdimensional sirens where she found her mother talking to her father in the kitchen. She has many noticeable habits: she has long fingernails, both to have more of a witch-like appearance, as well as to make it easier to open up sweet chestnuts,^{ep.1}^{ep.1} is able to find easier ways to word the magic spells she is taught, which in turn actually helps most of the witches she trains with. She cannot ride a broom the normal witch way, so she rides it like one would a skateboard since she was quite skilled with one back in the Human Realm.^{ep.3}^{ep.3}

=== Sheila ===
Voiced by: Houko Kuwashima (Japanese); Cindy Robinson (English)

Sheila (シーラ, Shīra) is the discipline officer in charge of the apprentice witches in district A. The most knowledgeable and adept witch of the trio, she initially disliked Arusu's attitude. The Curse of Eternal Youth was cast on her and Eva for their failure to keep Arusu from setting all of the fairies free.^{ep.2}^{ep.2} For the first half of the series, she was concentrated on recapturing all the fairies in order to remove the spell (she was mostly concerned with removing the spell from Eva). Sheila is the daughter of a witch and warlock, so according to customs, she must live in the Witch Realm away from her father. Her mother abandoned her early in life to stay with her husband in the Warlock Realm. This hardened her heart and she became a perfectionist, bent on becoming a powerful witch and depending on no one but herself.^{ep.11}^{ep.11} Arusu's pacifist beliefs annoyed her at first, but had a change of heart later in the season, becoming one of Arusu's strongest allies and supporters. She was later entrusted by the grand master to find the traitor among the witches, the person the warlocks need to cast dark magic. She suspected Barunn, Nerabu, and Biris, unaware that the future traitor is closer to her than she thinks. Though she may seem gruff, Sheila has a good heart.

=== Eva ===
Voiced by: Ryo Hirohashi (Japanese); Mela Lee (English)

A friend of both Arusu and Sheila, Eva (エバ, Eba) is a friendly witch with a small amount of power. The Curse of Eternal Youth was cast on her and Sheila for their failure to keep Arusu from setting all of the fairies free.^{ep.2}^{ep.2} Though neither Sheila nor Arusu consider her a burden because she has weak magic, she would constantly go out of her way to make herself more useful, often getting into trouble. Her magic becomes stronger later in the series.^{ep.24}^{ep.24} When the witches started losing their magic and collapsing due to the destruction of the Magical Realm, Eva eventually became afflicted by the same ailment. Grande took advantage of her weak heart and her desperation to keep her magic, manipulating her into casting dark magic. She was later saved by Arusu and dark magic was dispelled. She has a noticeable habit of finding some of the most bizarre things and creatures to be "cute".

== Witches ==
=== Atelia ===
Voiced by: Atsuko Tanaka (Japanese); Jessica Gee (English)

Atelia (アテリア, Ateria) is one of the Three Sages. When she was younger, during a raid of the Warlock Realm to retrieve the True Book of Spells, she met Jidan who was wrongfully imprisoned in the Warlock Realm. Against the rules of the Witch Realm, she married Jidan who had a son named Lennon. She decided to leave them and deliver the True Book of Spells back to the grand master, wanting to keep the warlocks from destroying the Human Realm through dark magic. But the book was stolen by Jidan while she cried in her sleep. She tried looking for her husband and son after she realized that she truly wanted to stay with them. Unfortunately, she never found them until Arusu arrived years later to the Magical Realm. She realized through Arusu that there are more important things than preserving tradition and the pride of witches. She has a noticeable habit of biting her nails when under duress.

=== Gana, Grand Master of Witches ===
Voiced by: Ryōko Kinomiya (Japanese); Catherine Battistone (English)

The grand master (グランドマスター, gurando mastā), real name Gana (ガーナ, Gāna), is the leader of the witches, who was responsible for the defeat of the Ice Dragon and Witch with the help of her adoptive sister, Hanamomo.^{ep.4}^{ep.3} She cast the Curse of Eternal Youth on Sheila and Eva as punishment for their failure to keep the fairies from escaping from their holding facility.^{ep.2}^{ep.2} She later entrusted Sheila with the task of finding a traitor among the witches.

=== Special Task Force ===
Voiced by: Takako Honda (Barunn), Yuu Sugimoto (Nerabu), Kimiko Saito (Biris) (Japanese); Lauren Landa (Barunn), Alison James (Nerabu), Julie Rei Goldstein (Biris) (English)

The special capture squad are a team of three witches sent by Atelia to recapture the fairies after Arusu frees them. The team is made up of the dark-skinned Barunn (バルヌ, Barunu), the masked Nerabu (ネラブ, Nerabu), and the blindfolded Biris (ビリス, Birisu). When they find out that the Magical Realm was about to be destroyed, they rebel against Atelia and the rest of the Three Sages to take over the Witch Realm before it collapses. Later on, they team up with Grande to get the True Book of Spells and the 100 species of fairies they need to cast dark magic. They were initially regarded as the traitors before finding out that it was Eva who used dark magic.

=== Qoo ===
Voiced by: Kikumi Umeda (Japanese); Marin Miller (English)

Qoo (クー, Kū) is a young witch who is very untalented with magic. Witches who cannot perform magic by the time they are sixteen are sent to the Human Realm, a fate all witches fear.^{ep.9}^{ep.9} Arusu helped her gain confidence in herself. When Arusu turned herself to stone to save the Witch Realm from a rampaging hydra, Qoo used her own hair to perform the spell that turned Arusu back to normal.^{ep.10}^{ep.10} Later in the series, she appeared again when her grandmother became one of the witches who lost their magic and collapsed.

== Warlocks ==
=== Wizard Kingdom ===
Wizard Kingdom (ウィザードキングダム, Wizādo Kingudamu) is the capital city of the Warlock Realm and the headquarters for the primary antagonistic force in Tweeny Witches. The warlock military start capturing fairies for use as the source of dark magic after finding out that all fairies have escaped.

==== Sigma ====
Voiced by: Hiroyuki Yoshino (Japanese); Phil Meyers (English)

Sigma (シグマ, Shiguma) is a young warlock and the son of a prophet. He guided Arusu and her friends to the Warlock Realm in order to help Grande get the True Book of Spells from them. In the end, he was thrown in prison for his failure to bring the warlocks the book and a witch they need to cast dark magic. Sigma's father was killed by Grande when he tried to advise him not to use the forbidden dark magic because he foretold that a savior, Arusu, would come and save the world. Later in the series, it was revealed that Sigma was actually working covertly against Grande in order to help his father's prophecy come true.

==== Grande ====
Voiced by: Jouji Nakata (Japanese); Taylor Henry (English)

Grande (グランデ, Gurande) is the military dictator of Wizard Kingdom. Seeing the eventual destruction of his world, he wanted to use the forbidden dark magic to save it, which he believed would create a new world for them to live in. He needed the True Book of Spells, all the 100 species of the fairies, and a witch who has darkness in her heart. He found Eva. He helped her gain more power and when she lost that power, he knew she would do anything to regain it.

=== Wizards ===
==== Wil ====
Voiced by: Fubito Yamano (Japanese); Joe DiMucci (English)

Wil (ウィル, Wiru) is one of the last wizards. His people were driven out of Wizard Kingdom where science is becoming more important than magic.^{ep.18}^{ep.18} 14 years ago,^{ep.5}^{ep.5} he helped Jidan and young Lennon hide from Atelia and sent them on board a ship for the Human Realm.^{ep.18}^{ep.18}^{ep.30}^{ep.30} Later, he helped Jidan's daughter, Arusu, save her friends and the fairies.

== Humans ==
=== Jidan ===
Voiced by: Atsuki Tani (Japanese); Tony Oliver (English)

Jidan (ジダン, Jidan) is the father of Lennon and Arusu. He was an archaeologist investigating the mystery of the Crow statue when he fell into the Magical Realm. He was arrested in Wizard Kingdom due to Grande's paranoia that a human might destroy the Magical Realm.^{ep.40}^{ep.40} He was later rescued by Atelia during the raid on Wizard Kingdom to retrieve the True Book of Spells. The two married and had a son against the law of the witches and lived happily for a while until Atelia decided to deliver the True Book of Spells back to the grand master. 14 years ago, taking the True Book of Spells ^{ep.5}^{ep.5} (intending to keep it from being used for harm) and his son, he sneaked aboard the vessel that travels across the Interdimensional Sea to the Human Realm with the help of Wil. Unfortunately, he was separated from Lennon during the travel and made it to the Human Realm alone.^{ep.30}^{ep.30} There he married Yoko and had a daughter, Arusu. He gave his daughter the True Book of Spells for safe keeping, knowing that the people of the Magical Realm could not reach it or find it in the Human Realm. In search of his lost son, he traveled back to the Magical Realm and was imprisoned again for six years before escaping with his roommate, Sigma. When Luca's men were looking for him and Atelia, Jidan offered himself to save her. However, in the last episode of the season, Arusu found him talking to her mother in their apartment in the Human Realm.^{ep.40}^{ep.40} How he escaped death and made it back to Yoko is currently unknown.

=== Lennon ===
Voiced by: Yūki Tai (Japanese); Ian Hawk (English)

Lennon (レノン, Renon) is the son of Atelia and Jidan and by extension the older half-brother of Arusu. He roamed the Interdimensional Sea as a pirate since he was accidentally separated from Jidan 14 years ago. He would ambush the vessel taking failed witches to the Human Realm and take all of their food and supplies. He found Arusu in one of those vessels and called himself her mirror. They found their way back to the Witch Realm where he was mistaken for a girl until Atelia corrected the mistake. As a child, he developed a hatred for his mother for abandoning him and his father. Upon finding her, he wanted to kill her, but later had a change of heart when she offered herself in his place after he was taken hostage by warlocks, as well as when Wil revealed how desperately she searched for Jidan and himself when they first left and that it was Jidan who took him away as a way to protect Atelia from being punished for having fallen in love with a human.
