= List of Bamboo Blade characters =

This is a list of characters from the manga/anime Bamboo Blade. The show aired from October 2, 2007, to April 2, 2008, with 26 episodes being released. It has had many spin-offs and comic/manga stories created.

A large amount of the surnames are taken from various winners of the All Japan Kendo Championships.

== Muroe Private High School ==
=== Toraji Ishida ===
Toraji Ishida (石田 虎侍, Ishida Toraji) / Kojiro (コジロー, Kojirō)
Voiced by: Katsuyuki Konishi (Japanese); Ian Sinclair (English)
Also known as "Kojirō", he is the kendo instructor, and also a teacher of politics and economics, at Muroe High School. He is the main protagonist of the series as well as the male lead. He is perpetually impoverished and lives from paycheck to paycheck, often taking handouts of food from his students. He is offered the chance of a lifetime from an old senpai ― a year's supply of sushi if his female kendo team can beat his senpai's in a practice tournament. This inspires Kojirō to put an effort into training his team, much to the delight of his most dedicated student, Kirino Chiba. The only person who knows the real reason for Kojirō's inspiration is Yūji Nakata, who calls him "pathetic". Kojirō's parents own a convenience store, but it is revealed that they used to own a store that sold sake. Kojirō's parents look young for their age, and his mother acts young (she makes a hobby of collecting cute things). Despite Kojirō's poverty, he somehow owns and maintains a high-performance car. In high school, he was a member of the kendo club. At that time he defeated his senpai, Kenzaburō, at a tournament to win a trophy. Though he has little affinity for the trophy itself, he cherishes the memory of his victory over Kenzaburō. Although he told Kenzaburō his victory was due to luck, he personally believes the reason he won was he was stronger than his senpai.

=== Tamaki Kawazoe ===
Tamaki Kawazoe (川添 珠姫, Kawazoe Tamaki)
Voiced by: Ryō Hirohashi (Japanese); Cherami Leigh (English)
Tamaki Kawazoe is a first year high school student and the female lead of the story. She is nicknamed "Tama-chan" for short. Despite being a kendo prodigy, she does not see it as a hobby, but rather just as a chore honed at her home, which happens to be a kendo dojo led by her father. She refuses to join the school's Kendo Club because she thinks it is unnecessary, but she temporarily becomes a member in order to fight off a bully. She despises injustice due to her overdeveloped sense of righteousness and fair play inspired from watching tokusatsu as a child; her favorite is Blade Braver. She remains a big anime and tokusatsu fan despite her age. At first, she is very shy and unsociable, but she begins to overcome her shyness and open up to her teammates more often after holding a part-time job at Miyako's acquaintance's store. Kirino, Sayako (and for that matter, most girls in the story) find her very cute, often putting Tamaki's hair up in ponytails or making her fight in kendo matches just because they want to see her fight. She knows Yūji before the beginning of the series, and she has been called "Tama-chan" by him since their childhood although she does not like the nickname very much since it makes her seem childish). She is described as being the strength of the group by Kojirō. Tamaki lost for the very first time in the Kanto High School Kendo Tournament to Rin, Tamaki's arch-rival stemming from the Blade Braver series. Her loss was partly because Rin used a stance which reminded her of her late mother causing her to lose focus and concentration temporarily. In elementary school, she reached the top three in the national kendo match.
She plays the position of General (Taishou) in the competition.

=== Kirino Chiba ===
Kirino Chiba (千葉 紀梨乃, Chiba Kirino)
Voiced by: Megumi Toyoguchi (Japanese); Luci Christian (English)
Kirino Chiba is a second year high school student and the captain of the kendo club. Energetic and enthusiastic, she dreams of leading the team to the nationals. Her family owns a deli named "Chiba Deli". Kirino is very happy that Kojirō has finally begun to put more effort into training his kendo team, but she is oblivious to the real reason that her teacher has suddenly begun to train the team enthusiastically. She is proud that she is the captain of the kendo club and is more responsible than she appears. For example, she picks up the shinai when the other members leave them lying around on the floor and chides the other members for not picking up after themselves. Kirino seems to find Tamaki quite adorable; she and Sayako will often treat Tamaki as a "little sister" type. Examples of this are playing with Tamaki's hair, not listening to her kendo lectures, and making Tamaki fight merely because she wants to see her fight. Despite that, she has great confidence in Tamaki. She is described as being the heart of the group by Kojirō. She also shows a strong emotional attachment to Kojirō as displayed in the last anime episode when he comes back as the club's instructor.
She plays the position of Second-in-Command (Fukushou) in the competition.

=== Miyako Miyazaki ===
Miyako Miyazaki (宮崎 都, Miyazaki Miyako)
Voiced by: Houko Kuwashima (Japanese); Leah Clark (English)
Miyako Miyazaki is a first year high school student nicknamed "Miya-Miya". She is introduced as a very pretty and friendly girl, and to the surprise of many, the girlfriend of Danjūrō. However, in reality, she possesses a very dark and sadistic personality, but she hides it in order to be together with Danjūrō. In the manga, she also smokes in school and hangs out with two girls that are possibly delinquents, but she is not seen doing so in the anime. When Miyako shows her more sadistic side, she is surrounded by a black aura and acts in a rather eerie and cruel manner, but she instantly switches back to her friendly façade when others are approaching or calling her name. Having only joined the Kendo Club because Danjūrō was in it, she initially finds it boring, but she later enjoys it after realizing she likes to hit people. She has rather quick and powerful strikes, but she at first does not use any other moves other than attempting to strike her opponents in the head in the anime. In one episode of the anime, however, Miyako was shown to strike at the other areas on her opponent although none of the strikes counted due to incorrect posture. She is very afraid of her middle school classmate, Reimi Odajima. This is due to a love relationship incident that resulted in Reimi stalking her ever since. As the series goes on, her kendo skills begins to improve tremendously, and she finally managed to score a kote point against Azuma in the 22nd episode.
She plays the position of Second-Vanguard (Jihô) in the competition.

=== Sayako Kuwahara ===
Sayako Kuwahara (桑原 鞘子, Kuwahara Sayako)
Voiced by: Sachiko Kojima (Japanese); Brina Palencia (English)
Sayako Kuwahara is a second year high school student described as being random and spontaneous, often changing her interests and goals. During her first year, she joins the Kendo Club, but she would sometimes disappear for short periods of time, claiming to quit. She and Kirino have known each other since elementary school, and Kirino often calls her "Saya". She is one of the tallest members on the team; others poke fun at this by "mistakenly" calling her a boy. In the storyline, she was seen to improve her footwork tremendously after a brief teaching session from Tamaki. Sayako, like Kirino, thinks that Tamaki is cute; she and Kirino will sometimes do silly things to Tamaki, such as playing with Tamaki's hair, not listening to her kendo lectures, and making Tamaki fight merely because she wants to see her fight. She is rather pessimistic and always claims to pursue death the moment she fails at something. In the anime, her writer's hobby is seen when telling stories, such as explaining why Asuma quit kendo in a dramatic fashion; her friends gave her three points since they found her "story" uninteresting. In the manga, she is seriously against high schooler smokers, confiscating Miya-Miya's cigarettes (before they were introduced each other in the kendo club the next day), leading to a bad start between them, that was resolved when Miya apologized to Saya, promising not to smoke again inside the school and leaving the pack of cigarettes she was carrying at the time to Saya, telling her to "hold them for her". Saya later forgot to throw them away and his little brother will caught her with the pack on her hands, making her family think she was a smoker and ending in a funny scene (her mother reacted by punching her in the face and his father skipped work for the first time to scold her).
In another occasion, she argued with some girls from the Kamazaki highschool kendo club, who were smoking, before the practice match. The girls reacted very angry, but before something happened Miya-Miya intervened and told Saya to leave them alone, mocking the girls by telling them that smoking was kids' stuff and that she dropped it after Middle school, making them even angrier. They later, fought against these girls on the practice match.
She plays the position of Center (Chûken) in the competition.

=== Satori Azuma ===
Satori Azuma (東 聡莉, Azuma Satori)
Voiced by: Rina Satō (Japanese); Carrie Savage (English)
Satori Azuma, a class 1-3 high school student in the anime, is the fifth and the last person to join the Kendo Club. She is very talented in kendo. In fact, Satori is the second strongest in the club, with Tamaki being the strongest. Despite her diligence, she is very bad with her studies. It is revealed her glasses are fake; she thought she would get smarter by wearing them. She decided to quit kendo after middle school in order to concentrate on her studies. Because she is rather naïve, she is tricked by Miyako Miyazaki into joining the club, thinking that Kendo will help her improve her studies. Satori is comically clumsy, as demonstrated in the ending sequences and previews in the anime.
She plays the position of Vanguard (Senpou) in the competition.

=== Yuji Nakata ===
Yūji Nakata (中田 勇次, Nakata Yūji)
Voiced by: Daisuke Sakaguchi (Japanese); Chris Burnett (English)
Yūji Nakata is a kind, cheerful, and helpful first year student who joins the Kendo Club. He was a member of his junior high school's kendo club and had also attended the Kawazoe Dojo. He had reached the top five in the prefectural games during junior high. In the Q&A of the manga, Tamaki asserts that he is stronger than Toyama. He is almost on par with Tamaki in skill, and he has defeated Satori Azuma once. Yūji has used kendo to scare away some gangsters although he panicked after the gangsters had run off. He is also the only person who knows of Kojirō's true reason for training his kendo team with more gusto than before. He also possesses considerable academic skill; he scored fourth out of all the freshmen on the regional exams.

=== Danjuro Eiga ===
Danjūrō Eiga (栄花 段十朗, Eiga Danjūrō)
Voiced by: Akira Ishida (Japanese); Sean Michael Teague (English)
Also known as Dan-kun, Danjūrō Eiga is a round and plain-faced (and somewhat goofy-looking) first year who joins the Kendo Club with Yūji. He originally wanted to join the Ping Pong Club, but there was no such club in the school. He shocks Yūji and Kojirō when he brings his pretty girlfriend Miyako, whom they assumed had the same cartoony look, to join the club. While he finds the basic training to be "boring" (possibly because he wants to impress Miyako), he is rather proficient in scorekeeping, as shown in one episode of the anime. While he generally comes off as rather dim-witted, it appears he is perceptive to the character Miyako does not want him to see. In Episode 11, he was hinted to also have his own "dark side" during a staring contest he had with Kojirō. However, his "black mode" was subtler than Miyako's "black mode," and his aura only showed in his eyes. He has no past experience with Kendo, but he is improving very quickly, even to the point where Yūji thinks Danjuro might surpass him before they graduate. Yūji has even remarked in an episode of the anime that Danjūrō "are meant for kendo". Eiga is arguably the smartest member of the Kendo club because he scored 2nd place is the Muroe High School Regional exams for freshman. By the end of the anime series, it is revealed that he is the new captain of the Kendo Club.

=== Akira Toyama ===
Akira Toyama (外山 晶（とやま あきら）, Toyama Akira)
Voiced by: Atsushi Imaruoka (Japanese); Newton Pittman (English)
Toyama is a second year high school bully and formerly a member of the Kendo Club. He often ditches kendo practice and had caused all the previous club members to quit with the exception of Kirino and Sayako. He did so by "teaching" them techniques; he was just constantly hitting them with his shinai. Once, Miyako attempts to teach him and Iwasa a lesson, but she fails to do so when Sayako crashes into her. After losing the match to Tamaki, he had not been in kendo club, and was only known to Yuji later that he had quit kendo. In episodes 22 and 23, it is also shown that he and Iwasa are delinquents; they fought two other students when provoked in a video game arcade and destroyed two machines ― an act that almost led to the kendo club's suspension. Although he and Iwasa terrorized the kendo club during their brief time in the club, Toyama actually feels that he is not as strong as he appears as shown in episode 24 of the anime. After losing a kendo match to Eiga during the kendo club suspension deadline day, he handed the resignation letters dated in spring to Yuji. After easily losing to her, it is implied that he is afraid of Tamaki due to her strength. In the closing credits of the anime's final episodes, it is shown that he has joined the soccer team with Iwasa, and he is verbally fighting with an opposing player.

=== Masaru Iwasa ===
Masaru Iwasa (岩佐 勝（いわさ まさる）, Iwasa Masaru)
Voiced by: Yūichi Ishigami (Japanese); Cris George (English)
Iwasa is Toyama's friend and fellow Kendo Club member, who also ditches practice. Nothing much is known about this character, and he has not been seen with a shinai before in the anime. In the anime, he and Toyama have quit kendo following after losing a match to Tamaki, but the resignation letter would only be delivered after losing to Eiga in kendo match during the kendo club suspension deadline day. Both he and Toyama are delinquents and have resigned kendo despite their fondness of it. In the closing credits of the final episode of the anime, he is shown to be on the soccer team with Toyama.

=== Shinobu Toyama ===
Shinobu Toyama (外山 忍, Toyama Shinobu)
Voiced by: Chiwa Saitō (Japanese); Kayla Carlyle (English)
Akira's younger sister, who wants to join ping-pong club, lacrosse club, and sepak takraw club, but none of the clubs she likes exist. So, in the end, she joins her friend, Makoto, in joining the kendo club. She is impatient and ill-mannered, but her attitude is better than her brother's. Her brother's gear was given to her by her mother.

=== Makoto Iwasa ===
Makoto Iwasa (岩佐 誠, Iwasa Makoto)
Voiced by: Yoshinori Fujita (Japanese); Shelton Windham (English)
Makoto is one of the new freshman members of the kendo club and turns out to be Masaru's little brother. He is patient, polite, and cool-headed, unlike his brother. Makoto is a complete beginner when it comes to kendo. He was impressed when he observed Tamaki doing kendo, which makes him more motivated to join the kendo club. Makoto's kendo gear was given to him by his brother.

=== Yoshikawa ===
Yoshikawa (吉河（よしかわ）)
Voiced by: Hinako Sasaki (Japanese); Stephanie Young (English)
A class 1-3 substitute teacher, Yoshikawa becomes involved in Muroe's kendo club out of concern for Satori's well-being. When Satori shows that she is capable of balancing kendo with schoolwork, Yoshikawa continues to support the kendo club. She and Kojirō become friends and frequently chat when they are both in the staff room. She is skilled at playing video games. When Kojirō leaves the kendo club, Yoshikawa is requested by the club to become their advisor; she agrees to do so until she goes on maternity leave. The father of her baby is Kenzaburō, Kojirō's upperclassman.

=== Other characters ===
Principal (校長先生, Kouchou)
Voiced by: Katsumi Chō
The principal of Muroe High School. He is a gentle person, but he can't go against the chairman's orders. Under the pressure of Reimi's mother through the chairman and his wife, Kojiro was notified that he would be dismissed for this year only.
Vice Principal (教頭先生, Kyoutou)
Voiced by: Kunihiro Kawamoto (Japanese); Andrew Sensenig (English)
The vice principal of Muroe High School. He is seen in episode one when he falls out the school's third floor window. Tamaki saved his life by quickly grabbing a broom nearby and hitting him back up through the window he fell out of. He lends Tamaki his glasses, which she uses under the guise of Bureiba.
Shima (島（しま）先生, Shima Sensei)
A class 1-3 primary teacher.
Muscular Girl (屈強女子, Kukkyou joshi)
Voiced by: Kazuko Kojima (Japanese); Majken Bullard (English)
Yuriko Yamase (山瀬百合子, Yamase Yuriko)
Yano (矢野（やの）, Yano)
Voiced by: Makoto Yasumura

== Machido High School ==
Kenzaburō Ishibashi (石橋 賢三郎, Ishibashi Kenzaburō)
Voiced by: Tetsu Inada (Japanese); Christopher Sabat (English)
Kenzaburō Ishibashi is Kojirō's old senpai and the kendo coach from Machido High School. He was beaten by Kojirō during a kendo meet long ago in their high school years and seems to hold a grudge against him for that, even if it does not seem apparent. Kenzaburō is also jealous of Kojirō's team, particularly because he has Tamaki Kawazoe, a freshman of Muroe High who beat two of his kendo team members in a practice duel one time. Kenzaburō is a more dedicated teacher than Kojirō, but like his kohai he trains his kendo team only for his own personal gain. He is assumed to be married to Yoshikawa-sensei, one of the teachers at Muroe High School and Kojirō's co-worker who was also a temporary adviser to Muroe High's kendo club.
Konatsu Harada (原田 小夏, Harada Konatsu)
Voiced by: Kei Shindō (Japanese); Jad Saxton (English)
Konatsu Harada, the first third-year student on the team, is the shortest of the five members of the team Kenzaburo chose, and also the shyest. She is rather skilled in kendo as Kenzaburo once remarks that she has a 2-dan rank, is "self-motivated", and comes to practice every day. She is very quiet and can be flustered by some of the things her team, particularly her teacher, does (as shown in one episode of the anime). Konatsu is one of the strongest members on the team, second only to Karen Nishiyama. During a practice match with Muroe High Konatsu, she was beaten by Tamaki Kawazoe.
Maya Yokoo (横尾 摩耶, Yokoo Maya)
Voiced by: Kiyomi Yazawa (Japanese); Colleen Clinkenbeard (English)
Maya Yokoo, the second third-year student on the team, is a competitive and tall girl with more team spirit than anyone else in her team. Maya is a bit of a tomboy and tends to speak in a rather aggressive and foul-mouthed manner, calling her teammates "twits" and "dumbasses" when they do not take kendo seriously. However, she will stick up for her teammates when Yūri says cruel things about them (or rather, Akemi), as shown in two episodes of the anime. Apparently, she also seems to have a rather large appetite that causes her to eat so much that she ends up with a severe stomachache later on. Tamaki beat Maya during the last round of the practice match with Muroe High, much to the latter's displeasure and shock.
Yūri Andō (安藤 優梨, Andō Yūri)
Voiced by: Mayuko Omimura (Japanese); Alexis Tipton (English)
Yūri Andō, the first second-year student on the team, is a girl who seems to zone out most of the time and seems not to care much about winning, but her looks can deceive others greatly. She is rather skilled at kendo and is quite sadistic, like Miyako Miyazaki of Muroe High. Another trait of hers that resembles Miyako's is Yūri's tendency to turn "black" and let some of her true nature show through, which always manages to induce fear in everyone, including her own teammates. (Unlike Miyako, however, Yūri also tends to openly badmouth her teammates, particularly Akemi Asakawa, when they do something that displeases her.) When Yūri is showing her crueler side, she is surrounded by a rather eerie black aura that looks rather similar to, if not exactly like, Miyako's "black" aura. Yūri also tends to resort to using nasty methods to win (such as tripping people with her foot, stepping on her opponents' feet, and "harassing" her opponent by showing her "black" aura) and then deny that she has cheated in a falsely sweet manner, much to the chagrin of the other members of her kendo team, who are already rather frustrated with her apparent lack of team spirit. Apparently Yūri has a bit of a sweet tooth, as she once cost her team precious time at a practice match with Muroe High by making them stop at a café so she could "charge" her brain with sugar. She apparently does not function well in the morning. Another one of Yūri's disturbing traits, seen in episode 15, is her ability to sleep with her eyes open. This freaks Tamaki out when she wakes up next to her while at Training Camp. Occasionally she is seen reading a book during important moments (such as kendo matches or team member assignments), a habit that only emphasizes her complete lack of desire to win. She was the replacement of Tamaki in the part-time job at the shop, increasing the sales but turning the place into some sort of black magic shop (as seen on Special chapter 58.5 in the manga).
Karen Nishiyama (西山 佳恋, Nishiyama Karen)
Voiced by: Natsuki Mori (Japanese); Trina Nishimura (English)
Karen Nishiyama, the third third-year student on the team, is incredibly skilled at kendo, but tends to shake when nervous. When she is cornered in a kendo match, she instinctively switches to the offensive, thus effectively beating her opponent. Because of her instinct of going on offense when in trouble Karen is the strongest on her kendo team. Even though she is extremely skilled at kendo, she does not like the idea of fighting an opponent that she does not know in real life, and she will attempt to run away when she is nervous.
Akemi Asakawa (浅川 明美, Asakawa Akemi)
Voiced by: Saki Kondō (Japanese); Kate Oxley (English)
Akemi Asakawa, the second second-year student on the team, is probably the most undedicated out of all the members of her team, as she seems only to care about her boyfriend to the point where she will ditch kendo club for her boyfriend. When she encounters a problem with her boyfriend, she will not do her best and will only go on the defense; however, when her boyfriend makes up with her, she will immediately start pouring out all of her effort, making her a rather formidable opponent. Apparently, none of her teammates save for Kenzaburō have any real concern for her, as they simply let her constant ditchings slide (even if she is ditching from a kendo match). Kenzaburō, however, is appalled with her habit of constantly ditching kendo just to meet up with her boyfriend and her lack of effort when she is upset. It is revealed in one episode of the anime that Akemi possesses "excellent footwork".

== Seimei High School ==
Tadaaki Hayashi (林 忠明, Hayashi Tadaaki)
Voiced by: Shinji Ogawa (Japanese); Greg Dulcie (English)
Tadaaki Hayashi is the coach for the Seimei High School kendo team. He is extremely strict with his students, and verbally and physically punishes them when they lose a match--even if it is against a stronger opponent. His tough training regiments often cause students to quit the kendo team, although he does not regret this, and considers quitters to be weak. After the practice with Muroe High, however, he seems to have changed his outlook on kendo, and is easier on his students, emphasizing the fun and excitement of kendo rather than its harshness and tough work.
Mei Ogawa (小川 芽衣, Ogawa Mei)
Voiced by: Kaori Nazuka (Japanese); Brittney Karbowski (English)
Mei is a freshman on the Seimei High School kendo team. She joined the team to be with her friends, although all of them eventually quit until she was the very last freshman girl left on the team. This discourages her, and she desired to quit the kendo team after the practice with Muroe High, but is convinced otherwise when getting fired up after practicing with Tamaki.
Reimi Odajima (小田島 礼美, Odajima Reimi)
Voiced by: Mai Nakahara (Japanese); Monica Rial (English)
A girl who attended the same middle school as Miyako, and became obsessed with her when she beat up a boy who Reimi had a crush on, but who liked Miyako. Since finding out that Miyako joined the kendo club, she follows her to every tournament, taking countless pictures and recording videos of her. Miyako is very disturbed by her stalking, and has lost a few matches due to being distracted by her.
Nozomi (ノゾミ, Nozomi)
Voiced by: Kazuko Kojima (Japanese); Anastasia Muñoz (English)
A first-year female student who joined kendo club with Mei Ogawa, but skipped the practice match with Muroe High School and called Mei about quitting the club.
Suzushiro (鈴城, Suzushiro)
Voiced by: Kayo Sakata (Japanese); Kristi Kang (English)
A female kendo club member who started kendo in high school.
Kawaguchi (川口, Kawaguchi)
Voiced by: Aika Fujiha (Japanese); Tia Ballard (English)
A female kendo club member who started kendo in high school.
Nomura (野村, Nomura)
Voiced by: Tomoko Nakamura (Japanese); Jessica Foster (English)
A female kendo club member who started kendo in high school.
Takahashi (高橋, Takahashi)
Voiced by: Azumi Asakura (Japanese); Didi Duron (English)
A female kendo club member who started kendo in high school.

== Tozyo High School ==
Konishi (小西, Konishi)
Voiced by: Yū Asakawa (Japanese); Larissa Wolcott (English)
Konishi is the general of the Tozyo High School team. She is the leader of the kendo team that has a reputation for winning matches through cheating. During the preliminary tournament, her schoolmates locked Tamaki in a shed after tricking her into coming to the parking lot to meet up with her father. There, Konishi got her out and led her to a trap where she injured her ankle after tripping over a bunch of tennis balls that were carefully placed. She was beaten by an enraged Tamaki in her match after receiving a throat strike, but the match was forfeited when Toraji pulled Tamaki out due to her injury. In the closing credits of the anime's final episode, it appears that she has gotten a haircut, and was scolding her classmates, presumably for attempting to cheat again. This suggests that she no longer resorts to cheating to win.
In the manga, after losing to Tamaki, it is revealed that when she was a child, she had violent tendencies (like breaking stuff) because her parents were divorced. Her family encouraged her to start kendo around that age, and thanks to this she calmed herself a bit, but after she started to improve, others started to expect from her and she started to feel pressured. Due to this pressure, she resorted to everything (even cheating), to accomplish victory. She then concluded that it would be better to lose (like she did against Tamaki) and stop others' high expectations, but in the end, she regained herself and claimed that she would get better, like Tamaki is.
Aoki (青木, Aoki)
Voiced by: Fumie Mizusawa (Japanese); Hilary Couch (English)
Terachi (寺地, Terachi)
Satou (佐藤, Satou)
Voiced by: Tae Okajima (Japanese); Megan Miller (English)
Iguchi (井口, Iguchi)
Voiced by: Mayuki Makiguchi (Japanese); Allison Tolman (English)

== Eishin High ==
The school's kendo team uniform consists of blue shirt, dark blue trousers, blue armour with red torso plate.

Carrie Nishikawa (西川 キャリー, Nishikawa Kaari)
Voiced by: Sanae Kobayashi (Japanese); Jamie Marchi (English)
An anime-only character, Carrie is an American girl raised in Japan with a loud and pushy attitude. She becomes Miyako's rival for Dan's affections since Carrie finds that he resembles her pet armadillo, Anderson. After seeing a samurai movie featuring a dual-wielding fighter as a child, she has always wanted to fight with two swords, and planned to compete in two-sword style as adult. As such, she is a strong opponent capable of using the two-sword style of kendo, despite high school competitions prohibiting the use of the two sword technique. Because Carrie has considerably more experience than the novice Miyako, Miyako trains especially hard to defeat Carrie. In the 25th episode, she finally defeats Carrie in a match, and later goes on to defeat her again with Carrie using the two-sword style (she defeats her after successfully knocking both swords from her hand with one swing).

== Shugyoku High ==
The school's kendo team uniform consists of white shirt, white trousers, white armour with yellow torso plate.

Rin Suzuki (鈴木 凛, Suzuki Rin)
Voiced by: Maaya Sakamoto (Japanese); Caitlin Glass (English)
A girl one year older than Tamaki, Rin is fond of the "Super Sentai Blade Braver" like Tamaki, but she prefers Shinaider (which sort of an enemy) more than the Blade Bravers. Rin and Tamaki first meet during a live action performance, where Red Braver had a guest appearance, and participate in a fan-quiz for the prize of limited edition Blade Braver dolls, which Rin wins (she only keeps the Shinaider doll and gives Tamaki the rest). Later, they work together in the new Blade Braver movie and the girls become friends and rivals because of their mutual interest the Braver series and their strength in kendo. She is the strongest opponent that Tamaki has ever seen and the first, and only person in the anime, to defeat Tamaki, using the high stance to do so. However, she is defeated by Tamaki at the same tournament where Kojirō defeated Kenzaburō nine years ago. During the final episode, it is shown that the two are still friends and see the Blade Braver movie together, both gaining respect for the other's favorite by the movie's end.

== Kamazaki High School ==
Takeshi Iwahori (岩堀 猛, Iwahori Takeshi)
Narumi Chikamoto (近本 成海, Chikamoto Narumi)
Takano (高野, Takano)
Hazamada (間田, Hazamada)
Nagashima (長島, Nagashima)
Sugiyama (杉山, Sugiyama)
Etou (衛藤, Etou)

== Touryuu High School ==
Sakaki Ura (榊 心, Ura Sakaki)

Sakaki is Tamaki's rival in the manga. Although they have barely met (and that Sakaki quit kendo), it is thought to have been "fate" and therefore everyone is hoping for a match between them and consider her Tamaki's only match. She is more or less a replacement for Rin Suzuki in the manga (although Rin has been mentioned), as she takes the role of the one to defeat Tamaki so that Tamaki becomes stronger. In the end, the one to defeat Tamaki first, was Sawamiya Erina, a 16-year-old TV idol (whose real name is Yamada Umeko, a former national-level kendoka, rival of Sakaki, that dropped kendo due to frustration over not being able to defeat Ura even once) in a special television event of kendo beauties (Muroe was invited because Odajima Reimi sent footage of Miya-Miya to the TV station). After that, Ura appeared and challenged Erina, leading to a long all-out fight, that left an impression on Tamaki (making her gain conviction and the will to become even stronger). Months later, a special tournament is held on TV. The first match of Muroe is against a team composed of Ura and other skilled kendo girls (including Erina), and after two wins and two losses, the decisive fight between Tamaki and Ura leads to the end of the history. In the anime, she is only seen at the ending credits of episode 26, first talking to Suzuki Rin and then when she and Tamaki cross each other at the tournament's entrance.

== Main characters' family ==
Toraji's father (虎侍の父, Toraji no Chichi)
Voiced by: Jūrōta Kosugi (Japanese); Charlie Campbell (English)
Toraji's father is seen briefly in the anime when he forces his son to work at the family convenience store during his visit. He is a tough man and a hard worker.
Toraji's mother (虎侍の母, Toraji no Haha)
Voiced by: Keiko Han (Japanese); Wendy Powell (English)
A convenience store cashier, she frequently sends packages of faddish health foods to her son. However, the food is usually insufficient nourishment for the poor Toraji, or of minimal use. She is shown briefly in the anime and forces her son to work at the store when he comes over to visit. Whenever she invites Kojiro for meal, she only serves nearly-expired food sold in the convenience store and charges for the food.
Tamaki's father (珠姫の父, Tamaki no Chichi)/Sanjuro Tamaki (川添 三十郎（かわぞえ さんじゅうろう）)
Voiced by: Katsumi Chō (Japanese); Mark Stoddard (English)
Tamaki's unnamed father is the head of the Kawazoe dojo. He encouraged Tamaki to take up kendo at a very young age, and is therefore responsible for her amazing skill in kendo. Tamaki's father was 48 during chapter 97 based on the flashback scene. That said, he is in practice a kind, loving, considerate and doting father who merely lacks articulate skills and confidence to express his affections for Tamaki. He constantly worries every time Tamaki brings up Yūji, mistakenly believing that he and Tamaki are seeing each other, to the point he spies on them at training camp to make sure nothing is happening and constantly frowning or making an angry face whenever Yūji's name is brought up. In the television series, his name is only called 'Tamaki's father' according to episode review.
Tsubaki Kawazoe (川添 椿（かわぞえ つばき）, Kawazoe Tsubaki)
Tamaki's mother, who died when Tamaki was very young. Tamaki has only a few memories of her mother, but greatly respects her and remembers that her mother was amazingly talented at kendo. She seemed to have been fond of the high stance, and Tamaki becomes distracted whenever an opponent uses it against her. In the television series, her face has appeared mostly in silhouette until episode 25.
Kirino's mother (紀梨乃の母, Kirino no Haha)
Voiced by: Kanako Hirano (Japanese); Cynthia Cranz (English)
Kirino's mother helps run the family's deli. She collapses from exhaustion in the middle of the series, which causes Kirino to become distressed and more withdrawn, although her seriousness improved her skills in kendo. In the middle of a match, however, her brother yelled out to her that their mother was all right, in which she immediately lost focus--and the match.
Kirino's younger brother (紀梨乃の弟, Kirino no Otouto)
Kirino's younger sister (紀梨乃の妹, Kirino no Imouto)
Kirino's father (紀梨乃の父, Kirino no Chichi)
Miyako's older sister (都の姉, Miyako no Ane)
Voiced by: Natsuki Mori
Sayako's mother (鞘子の母, Sayako no Haha)
Voiced by: Hiroko Katsura (Japanese); Melinda Wood Allen (English)
Saya's father (サヤの父)
Saya's younger brother (サヤの弟)/Kazuhiko Kuwabara (桑原 和彦（かずひこ）, Kuwabara Kazuhiko)
Voiced by: Kiyomi Yazawa (Japanese); Lindsay Seidel (English)
Sayako's younger brother.

== Kawazoe dojo pupil ==
Sakaguchi (坂口)
Voiced by: Takashi Nagasako (Japanese); R Bruce Elliott (English)
Sakaguchi is the owner of the kendo equipment shop that Kojirō takes his kendo team to for purchasing equipment. While Sakaguchi's kendo skills are only seen in a series of flashbacks in the anime, it is apparent that he is incredibly skilled at kendo, strong enough to make all of the members of Kojirō's team complain about him. He has a fondness for mochi, although Kojirō's kendo team tends to eat all of Sakaguchi's mochi during their visits to his shop. He is also, as Kojirō puts it, "very competitive".
Uchimura (内村, Uchimura)

== Ozawa Kenyuukai ==
A team consists of actors that has consulted Kawazoe dojo's instructor for kendo moves to be used in movies.

Ozawa (小沢, Ozawa)
Leader of Ozawa Kenyuukai. Also served as director for rehearsing action scenes in Blade Braver movie.

== Battle Hero Series ==
=== Blade Braver ===
It is a Battle Hero Series programme that was broadcast 10 years prior to the Cosmo 13 stage show featuring the resurrected Death Armor. The Bravers have face masks resembling kendo masks.

Red Braver/Juji
The red-suited protagonist in the television series, carrying a single-edged weapon.
Blue Braver
The blue-suited protagonist in the television series, carrying two single-edged weapons.
Yellow Braver
The yellow-suited protagonist in the television series, carrying a long handle version of Red Braver's weapon.
Death Armor
The primary villain in Blade Braver television series. Originally died during the Blade Braver television series, it was revived in the Cosmo 13 stage show attended by Tamaki, Rin Suzuki, and Yuji Nakata.
Shinaider
An enemy to the Bravers carrying bamboo sword, but ended up supporting them, and never able to defeat Braver on its own during the television series. The suit resembles a black version of Braver suit, but right half of the mask is in human skull shape.
Braver Robo
A giant robot resembling Red Braver, with cockpit capacity of 3 (later 4 in the movie) Bravers.
Death Friend
A Braver villain with cat eye mask and black tails that appeared during the Cosmo 13 stage show.
Cobrazaurus Death Friend
A Braver villain with rubber tires paddings appeared during the Cosmo 13 stage show. It was defeated by Red Braver and Cosmo 1.
Shinaigirl
Shinaider's female companion, introduced in the Brave Braver movie Rin and Tamaki had performed in.
high school girl (女子高生)
An extra character with spoken part, introduced in the Brave Braver movie. Originally to be performed by Rin, the role was assigned to Tamaki when Rin took the role of Shinaigirl to replace the original Shinaigirl actor injured earlier in the same filming day.
Silver Braver
A transformed version of Shinaider in white-suited and orange scarf, emerged after the fall of Shinaigirl. The right half of the Shinaider's mask broke off during the transformation, showing it to be the mirrored version of Shinaider's left half-mask.

=== Cosmo 13 ===
It is a Battle Hero Series programme, successor to Blade Braver. The protagonists have face masks based on traffic signs.

Cosmo 1
A red-suited Cosmo 13 member with red cross blue background circular traffic sign.

== Material Puzzle/Mat-Puz ==
It is a 46-episode television series within Bamboo Blade.

Donchil/Donchill
In the Bamboo Blade television series, it appears as a talking figure included in the limited edition Material Puzzle DVD box set.

== From Bamboo Blade derivative media ==
Hidaka (矢野（やの）)
A Muroe High soccer team member that is in the same class as Azuma.
Sakurai (桜井（さくらい）)
A Muroe High soccer team member.

=== From Bamboo Blade novel ===
Yuriko Yamase (山瀬 百合子（やませ ゆりこ）, Yamase Yuriko)
A former Muroe High kendo club member 40 years ago, she is an operator of a restaurant near Muroe High.

=== From Bamboo Blade drama CD ===
Yano (矢野（やの）)
Tamaki's classmate in Muroe High, started practicing kendo in middle school, and wants to enter boys' kendo club.

== Others ==
Reimi's mother (礼美の母, Reimi no Haha)
Voiced by: Kujira (Japanese); Pam Dougherty (English)
A woman who had connection with the wife of Muroe High School chairman. After her fight with Toraji in supermarket, she used her connection to get Toraji fired at the end of school semester. When Toraji returned to Morae High as kendo team advisor, she was moved and no longer has the influence to the high school administration as before.
MuMu House Manager (ムームーハウス店長)
Voiced by: Sayaka Ohara (Japanese); Clarine Harp (English)
Koutarou Miyazato (宮里 孝太郎, Miyazato Koutarou)
Nobu-chan (ノブちゃん)
Voiced by: Riki Kitazawa (Japanese); Chris Cason (English)
He introduced Toraji to work on ship after Toraji had abandoned the Muroe High kendo team advisor job during the 34th Shoryuki high school kendo tournament.
Matsuki (松木, Matsuki)
A soccer team captain from Miyazaki and Reimi Odajima's middle school.
Cat (ねこ, Neko)
Voiced by: Hōko Kuwashima (Japanese); Majken Ballard (English)
Considered to be the mascot character of Bamboo Blade, the Cat appears in every episode in the background or even seen interacting with the other characters. In Episode 25, two characters mention that the Gray cat that appears in the episode is a rare cat that only appears every 25 episodes.
Ano Kiyomura (清村 緒乃, Kiyomura Ano)
Voiced by: Kenji Nojima (Japanese); Josh Grelle (English)
Takachiho Suginokouji (杉小路 隆千穂, Suginokouji Takachiho)
Voiced by: Hirofumi Nojima (Japanese); Micah Solusod (English)
Hiroshi Narita (なりた洋, Narita Hiroshi)
Voiced by: Hiroshi Narita
Goro Taniguchi (谷口 悟朗（たにぐち ごろう）, Taniguchi Gōrō)
An animation director and author of Animation and Dreams. In the book, he announced plans to retire from production role, while still having one project left during the Bamboo Blade television series. In real life, he was credited for guest voicing a freshman in Bamboo Blade episode 11 (based on the contents, it is a girl Kirino and Saya met at Muroe High class 1-3 classroom doorway in the episode).
