= Houko Kuwashima =

Japanese voice actress and singer (born 1975)

- 桑島 法子
- Born: 12 December 1975 (age 50); Kanegasaki, Iwate, Japan
- Occupations: Voice actress; singer
- Years active: 1995–present
- Agent: Aoni Production
- Height: 158 cm (5 ft 2 in)
- Musical career
- Genres: J-Pop; Anison
- Instrument: Vocals
- Years active: 1996–present
- Labels: King Records; Konami Digital Entertainment; Victor Entertainment

Houko Kuwashima (桑島 法子, Kuwashima Hōko; born 12 December 1975) is a Japanese voice actress and singer. She is capable of playing a variety of roles, ranging from young boys to feminine women. She is affiliated with Aoni Production. Her first major role was as Yurika Misumaru in Martian Successor Nadesico and she has had lead or major roles in a number of others.

She has voiced characters in several video games. On film, she has had voice roles as the title character in Princess Arete and in Space Battleship Yamato 2199, Fullmetal Alchemist: Conqueror of Shamballa and Doraemon: Nobita in the Robot Kingdom.

She has performed songs for anime, such as "Tokihanate!" (解き放て), which was used as the opening theme to Blue Gender.

== Biography ==
Although a shy child, she was interested in acting as an escape from her real self, especially when she saw the musical and television dramas at the Shiki Theatre Company.

While in elementary school, Kuwashima watched Nausicaä of the Valley of the Wind while dreaming of becoming a voice actress. She wrote in a graduation collection, "I want to make the child's voices in the anime project of Hayao Miyazaki." She learned that there was no drama club or stage plays at the cultural festival at junior high school. At Iwate Prefectural Kurosawajiri North High School, she attended a correspondence course at Katsuta Voice Academy.The voice was recorded to cassette tape and corrected by the voice actor Hisashi Katsuta who was a director. However, attendance at the time of advancement was insufficient, and from the third year it was transferred to Iwate Prefectural Forest Mausoleum High School.

After graduating, she moved to Tokyo. She entered Aoiso in 1994. In auditions after graduation, about 20 out of 71 people passed the examination and joined Aoni Production. She made her debut in the 1995 anime series Sailor Moon S and voiced Necrokaizer in the OVA series adaptation Technōs/SNK's Neo Geo fighting game Voltage Fighter Gowcaizer. In 1996, in the anime series Martian Successor Nadesico, she had the role of the heroine Yurika Misumaru and gained popularity. She played Shiro Bonn in Bomberman B-Daman Bakugaiden and Maron Kusakabe in Phantom Thief Jeanne. In 1999, she sang the songs "Tokihanate!" and "Ai ga Oshiete Kureta", which were used as the opening and ending themes respectively to the anime series Blue Gender. She was appointed a cultural ambassador of Iwate Prefecture.

== Filmography ==
=== Animation ===
List of voice performances in animation
| Year | Title | Role | Notes | Source |
|---|---|---|---|---|
| 1995 | Sailor Moon SuperS | Schoolgirl | | |
| 1996 | Martian Successor Nadesico | Yurika Misumaru | | |
| 1997 | Slayers Try | Filia Ul Copt | | |
| 1997 | Dr. Slump | Tsururin Tsun, chick | | |
| 1998–1999 | Bomberman B-Daman Bakugaiden | Shirobon | Also in Bakugaiden V | |
| 1998 | Master Keaton | Yuriko Hiraga 平賀百合子 | | |
| 1998 | Dokkiri Doctor | Miyuki Koizumi | | |
| 1999 | One Piece | Going Merry (credited as Klaubautermann; episode 247), Victoria Cindry, Charlotte Pudding (episodes 856–863) | (Note: Kuwashima briefly took over the role of Charlotte Pudding during Miyuki Sawashiro's maternity leave.) | |
| 1999 | Phantom Thief Jeanne | Maron Kusakabe | | |
| 1999 | Betterman | Asami Miyako, Ouchin (Kazuhiko Hiraichi), Chandy | | |
| 1999 | Gokudo | Coco princess ココ姫 | | |
| 1999 | Aesop World | Claire クレア | | |
| 1999 | Steel Angel Kurumi | Nakahito Kagura | Also sequel in 2001 | |
| 1999 | Infinite Ryvius | Aoi Housen | | |
| 1999 | Blue Gender | Marlene Angel | | |
| 1999 | Shukan Storyland ja:週刊ストーリーランド | Emma / Kaori Eto · / Aika Kikuchi / Nagisa エマ/江藤香織/菊池彩香/渚 | | |
| 2000 | Gate Keepers | Maki Takikawa 瀧川真美 | | |
| 2000 | Platinumhugen Ordian | Kaori Kananase, Hilda Dumeyer | | |
| 2000 | Argento Soma | Harriet Bartholemew, Maki Agata | | |
| 2000 | Hiwou War Chronicles | Hiwō | | |
| 2001–2004 | Inuyasha | Sango | | |
| 2001–2003 | Beyblade series | Kenny Kyouju | | |
| 2001 | Zone of the Enders: 2167 Idolo | Dolores Hayes | OVA | |
| 2001 | Angelic Layer | Sai Jōnōchi | | |
| 2001 | Geneshaft | Tiki Musicanova | | |
| 2001 | Noir | Kirika Yuumura | | |
| 2001 | Z.O.E. Dolores, I | Dolores | | |
| 2001 | Project ARMS | Keith Violet | | |
| 2001 | Captain Kuppa | Fraje フレジェ | | |
| 2001 | Final Fantasy: Unlimited | Miles, Fango | | |
| 2001 | X | Satsuki Yatōji | | |
| 2002 | RahXephon | Quon Kisaragi | | |
| 2002 | Harukanaru Toki no Naka de Ajisai Yumegatari | Ran Morimura | OVA 1 | |
| 2002 | Chobits | Minoru Kokubunji | | |
| 2002 | Azumanga Daioh | Kagura | | |
| 2002 | The Twelve Kingdoms | Shoukei | | |
| 2002 | UFO Ultramaiden Valkyrie | Chorus | also specials 2003–2006 | |
| 2002 | Hanada Shōnen Shi | Sota Murakami 村上壮太 | | |
| 2002 | Mobile Suit Gundam SEED | Flay Allster, Natarle Badgiruel | | |
| 2002 | Gravion | Leele | | |
| 2002 | Bakuto Sengen Daigunder Rebooted | Akira Akebono | | |
| 2002 | Weiβ Kreuz Gluhen | Honjo Sun 本庄太陽 | | |
| 2003 | E's Otherwise | Sara | | |
| 2003 | Zatch Bell! | Koruru | | |
| 2003 | Ninja Scroll: The Series | Shigure | | |
| 2003 | Detective School Q | Megumi Minami | | |
| 2003 | Mermaid's Forest | Rin | | |
| 2003 | Planetes | Yuri's wife | | |
| 2003 | Maburaho | Boy | | |
| 2003 | Magical Domiko | Domiko's Mother | OVA | |
| 2004 | Gravion Zwei | Leele | | |
| 2004 | Mars Daybreak | Vestemona Lauren | | |
| 2004 | Sgt. Frog | Fuyuki Hinata | Ep. 232 and onwards | |
| 2004 | Madlax | Margaret Burton | | |
| 2004 | Monster | Vietnamese female doctor, Johan and Anna's mother | | |
| 2004 | Melody of Oblivion | Bocca Serenade | | |
| 2004 | Tweeny Witches | Sheila | | |
| 2004 | Uta Kata | Naho 菜穂 | | |
| 2004 | Desert Punk | Koike Noriko 鯉毛海苔子 | | |
| 2004 | Haruka: Beyond the Stream of Time: A Tale of the Eight Guardians | Morimura Ran | | |
| 2004 | Mobile Suit Gundam Seed Destiny | Stella Loussier | | |
| 2005 | Transformers: Galaxy Force | Hop | | |
| 2005 | Battle B-Daman: Fire Spirits! | Bears | | |
| 2005 | Onegai My Melody | Keiko Okabe 占部恵子 | | |
| 2005 | Trinity Blood | Sister Agnes | | |
| 2005 | Gun Sword | Wendy Garret | | |
| 2005 | Canvas 2: Niji Iro no Sketch | Tachibane Tone 橘天音 | | |
| 2005 | Happy Seven | Kuriya Kuroda | | |
| 2005 | Angel Heart | Shimazu Sujon 島津スジョン | | |
| 2006 | Fate/stay night | Mordred | | |
| 2006 | Ayakashi: Samurai Horror Tales | Tomihime | | |
| 2006 | Ergo Proxy | Kristeva | | |
| 2006–2007 | Kyō no Go no Ni | Ryōta Satō | OVAs | |
| 2006 | Yoshinaga-san Chi no Gargoyle | Hiyoho Takahara 高原イヨ | | |
| 2006 | Simoun | Guragief | | |
| 2006 | Ray the Animation | Yuka Takekawa 武川環奈 | | |
| 2006–2007 | The Story of Saiunkoku | Shūrei Hong | | |
| 2006 | Yume Tsukai | Yasumura Spring 安村春 | | |
| 2006 | Black Jack 21 | Shoren 小蓮 | | |
| 2006 | Otogi-Jūshi Akazukin | Mirror girl / Maren 鏡の少女/マレーン | | |
| 2006 | Baldr Force EXE Resolution | Bachelor | OVA | |
| 2006 | Cluster Edge Secret Episode | Elisabeth · Mina · Sulfur エリザベート・マイナ・サルファー | OVA | |
| 2006 | La Corda d'Oro: Primo Passo | Mizue Sakimoto | | |
| 2006 | Black Lagoon: The Second Barrage | Yukio Washimine | | |
| 2006 | D.Gray-man | Lala | | |
| 2006 | Hell Girl: Two Mirrors | Yayoi Kurayoshi | | |
| 2006 | Kenichi: The Mightiest Disciple | Kaede Tanimoto | | |
| 2006 | Kekkaishi | Yomi Kasuga | | |
| 2007 | Bleach | Cirucci Sanderwicci, Suì-Fēng | | |
| 2007 | Jūsō Kikō Dancouga Nova | Kurara Tachibana | | |
| 2007 | Please my melody clear ♪ ja:おねがいマイメロディ すっきり♪ | Keiko Okabe 占部恵子 | | |
| 2007 | GeGeGe no Kitaro | Hitomi, a hundred heroes, bones ひとみ/百々目鬼/骨太 | 5th TV series | |
| 2007 | El Cazador de la Bruja | Iris | | |
| 2007 | Kishin Taisen Gigantic Formula | Christy Aurelian | | |
| 2007 | Claymore | Clare | | |
| 2007 | Shining Tears X Wind | Zechti Ein, The Eternal Forest's Chanting | | |
| 2007 | Dennō Coil | Yūko Amasawa | | |
| 2007 | Zombie-Loan | Michiru Kita | | |
| 2007 | Mononoke | Ochō | | |
| 2007 | Shigurui: Death Frenzy | Mie Iwamoto | | |
| 2007 | Lupin III: Elusiveness of the Fog | Iseka イセカ | | |
| 2007 | Bamboo Blade | Miyako Miyazaki | | |
| 2007 | Night Wizard! the Animation | Joe Ga ジョー=ガ | | |
| 2007 | Mokke | Katsuragi Sajo 葛城佐保 | | |
| 2007–2008 | Clannad | Tomoyo Sakagami | Also in After Story. | |
| 2007 | MapleStory | Al | | |
| 2007 | Harukanaru Toki no Naka de 3 ~Kurenai no Tsuki~ | Kajiwara Saku | | |
| 2008 | Aria the Origination | Atora Monteverdi | | |
| 2008 | My-Otome 0~S.ifr~ | Una Shamrock | OVA series | |
| 2008 | Macross Frontier | Nanase Matsuura, Canaria Berstein | | |
| 2008 | Allison and Lilia | Allison Whittington (adult) | | |
| 2008 | Soul Eater | Medusa | | |
| 2008 | Top Secret ~The Revelation~ | Tsuyuguchi Kinuko 露口絹子 | | |
| 2008 | Kaiba | Kaiba | | |
| 2008 | Golgo 13 | Volga 2 ボルガ2 | | |
| 2008 | Yakushiji Ryōko no Kaiki Jikenbo | Yukiko Muromachi | | |
| 2008 | Natsume's Book of Friends | fire Fly ホタル | | |
| 2008, 2010 | Quiz Magic Academy: Original Animation | Rukia | OVA series | |
| 2008 | Hyakko | Tōma Kazamatsuri | | |
| 2008 | Kurozuka (novel) | Rai | | |
| 2008 | Mōryō no Hako | Atsuko Chuzenji 中禅寺敦子 | | |
| 2008 | Asagaro of Negiblob ja:ねぎぼうずのあさたろう | Radish noodles 大根のおきぬ | | |
| 2009 | Bleach | Soifon | | |
| 2009 | Valkyria Chronicles | Isara Gunther | | |
| 2009 | Sōten Kōro | crystal 水晶 | | |
| 2009 | Umi Monogatari | Sedna | | |
| 2009 | Element Hunters | Homi Nandie | | |
| 2009 | The story of a girl with a blue eyes ja:青い瞳の女の子のお話 | Eiko 英子 | | |
| 2009 | Aika Zero | Nina Hagen | OVA | |
| 2009–2010 | Inuyasha: The Final Act | Sango | | |
| 2009 | Kobato. | Chitose Mihara | | |
| 2009 | Darker than Black: Gemini of the Meteor | Shion Pavlichenko | | |
| 2009 | Aoi Bungaku | Lady | | |
| 2010 | Harukanaru Toki no Naka de 3 ~Owari Naki Unmei~ | Kajiwara Saku | | |
| 2010 | HeartCatch PreCure! | Itsuki Myoudouin / Cure Sunshine | | |
| 2010 | Rainbow: Nisha Rokubō no Shichinin | Junko Yoshida | | |
| 2010 | The Betrayal Knows My Name | Ibuki Shikibe | | |
| 2010–11 | Digimon Xros Wars series | Nene Amano, Cutemon, Laylamon, Ren Tobari, Taiki's mother, others | | |
| 2010 | Battle Spirits Brave ja:バトルスピリッツ ブレイヴ | Karen カレン | | |
| 2010 | Hakuōki Hekketsuroku | Chizuru Yukimura | | |
| 2010 | Star Driver | Midori Okamoto | | |
| 2011 | Gosick | Harminia | | |
| 2011 | Wish Upon the Pleiades | Minato | ONA series on YouTube | |
| 2011 | Beyblade: Metal Fury | Jigsaw ジグソー | | |
| 2011 | Pretty Rhythm: Aurora Dream | Sonata Kanzaki, Kaito | | |
| 2011 | Armored Trooper Votoms Ikkoro again | Stevia Bartler ステビア・バートラー | OVA | |
| 2011 | Nura: Rise of the Yokai Clan: Demon Capital | Yohime | | |
| 2011 | The Mystic Archives of Dantalian | Lianna リアンナ | | |
| 2011–2013 | Chihayafuru | Mari Wataya | 2 seasons | |
| 2011 | Shakugan no Shana III Final | Rebecca | | |
| 2011 | Un-Go | Atusko Kaneto | | |
| 2012 | Ginga e Kickoff!! | Misaki Shimizu | | |
| 2012 | Lupin the Third: The Woman Called Fujiko Mine | Angelica | | |
| 2012 | Sankarea: Undying Love | Maid chief May メイド長・五月 | | |
| 2012 | Shining Hearts: Shiawase no Pan | Kaguya | | |
| 2012 | Hakuōki Reimeiroku | Chizuru Yukimura | | |
| 2012 | Blast of Tempest | Yoshino Takigawa | | |
| 2013 | Student Council's Discretion | Runa Minase | Lv. 2 season and OAV | |
| 2013 | Oreimo | Kaori Makishima | | |
| 2013 | Duel Masters Victory V3 | Prasmai Zero プラマイ零 | | |
| 2013 | Space Battleship Yamato 2199 | Yuki Mori, Yurisha Iscandar | | |
| 2013 | Gatchaman Crowds | Rika Suzuki | Also Insight in 2015 | |
| 2013 | Phi Brain: Puzzle of God | Lavushka ラヴーシュカ | season 3 | |
| 2013 | Galilei Donna | Sylvia Ferrari | | |
| 2014 | Space Dandy | Scarlet | | |
| 2014 | Minna Atsumare! Falcom Gakuen | lease リース | | |
| 2014 | Z/X Ignition | Dragon's Priestess | | |
| 2014 | Inari, Konkon, Koi Iroha | Uka-no-Mitama-no-Kami | | |
| 2014 | Sgt. Frog | Fuyuki Hinata | | |
| 2014 | Hero Bank | Ai Gōshō | | |
| 2014 | Sword Art Online II | Urðr | | |
| 2014 | Cross Ange | Vivian | | |
| 2014 | Lord Marksman and Vanadis | Black Bow | | |
| 2014 | World Trigger | Kyoko Sawamura, Rei Nasu | | |
| 2014 | Girl Friend Beta | Shinobu Kokonoe | | |
| 2014–2016 | Cardfight!! Vanguard G series | Taiyou Asukawa | | |
| 2015 | Saekano: How to Raise a Boring Girlfriend | Sonoko Machida | | |
| 2015 | Sailor Moon Crystal | Green Esmeraude | | |
| 2015 | Wish Upon the Pleiades | Minato | | |
| 2015–2017 | Gintama | Shinsuke Takasugi (young) | | |
| 2015–2016 | Durarara!!x2 | Kasane Kujiragi | Ten and Tetsu cours | |
| 2015 | Subete ga F ni Naru | Momoko Kunieda | | |
| 2015 | Osomatsu-san | Jyushimatsu's Girlfriend (Episode 9) | | |
| 2016 | Ushio and Tora | Rama's older sister | season 2 | |
| 2016 | Hakuōki Otogisōshi | Chizuru Yukimura | | |
| 2016–2017 | Super Lovers | Kaido Ruri 海棠留理 | 2 seasons | |
| 2016 | Monster Hunter Stories: Ride On | cool クール | | |
| 2016 | Sound! Euphonium | Satomi Niiyama | season 2 | |
| 2016 | The Kubikiri Cycle | Rei | OVA | |
| 2017 | Restaurant to Another World | Narrator | (ep. 4) | |
| 2017 | Land of the Lustrous | Peridot | | |
| 2019 | 7 Seeds | Mitsuru Kagurazaka | | |
| 2019 | Mob Psycho 100 II | Ms. Suzuki | | |
| 2019 | Demon Slayer: Kimetsu no Yaiba | Kie Kamado | | |
| 2019 | Detective Conan | Ayako Ninagawa, Kazumi Tsukamoto (Ep. 361–362), Midorikawa Kurara (Ep. 512), Kei Kashitsuka/Serina Urakawa (Ep. 671–674), Tomoko Komori (Ep. 960) | | |
| 2019 | Crayon Shin-chan | Akai Yu, Noda Kaori | | |
| 2019 | Blade of the Immortal -Immortal- | Makie Otono-Tachibana | | |
| 2020–2021 | Boruto: Naruto Next Generations | Delta | | |
| 2020 | Our Last Crusade or the Rise of a New World | Founder Nebulis | | |
| 2020–2022 | Yashahime: Princess Half-Demon | Sango 珊瑚 | | |
| 2021 | Kaginado | Tomoyo Sakagami | | |
| 2022 | Miss Kuroitsu from the Monster Development Department | Scylla | | |
| 2022 | Orient | Obsidian Goddess | | |
| 2022 | Sazae-san | Landlady | | |
| 2022 | Akachan Honbucho | Baby (ep. 2), Kishitani (ep. 5) | Season 3 | |
| 2022-2026 | Bleach: Thousand-Year Blood War | Suì-Fēng, Cirucci Sanderwicci | | |
| 2023 | Pokémon Horizons: The Series | Lucca | | |
| 2023 | My Happy Marriage | Yurie | | |
| 2023 | Liar, Liar | Natsume Ichinose | | |
| 2024 | The Apothecary Diaries | Fengxian | | |
| 2024 | Beastars Final Season | Leano | | |
| 2026 | Jaadugar: A Witch in Mongolia | Fatima | | |
| 2026 | The Ghost in the Shell | Kusanagi's Friend (Long Hair) | | |

=== Film ===
List of voice performances in film
| Year | Title | Role | Notes | Source |
|---|---|---|---|---|
| 1998 | Martian Successor Nadesico: The Motion Picture – Prince of Darkness | Yurika Misumaru | | |
| 1999 | Go! Anpanman: When the Flower of Courage Opens | Uncle-chan うめこちゃん | | |
| 2001 | Princess Arete | Princess Arete | | |
| 2001 | Cowboy Bebop: The Movie | Cash register girl | | |
| 2001 | Inuyasha the Movie: Affections Touching Across Time | Sango | | |
| 2002 | Doraemon: Nobita in the Robot Kingdom | Poko | | |
| 2002 | Aterui アテルイ | Lalaca ララカ | | |
| 2002 | Beyblade: Fierce Battle | Kenny | | |
| 2002 | Inuyasha the Movie: The Castle Beyond the Looking Glass | Sango | | |
| 2003 | Inuyasha the Movie: Swords of an Honorable Ruler | Sango | | |
| 2004 | Inuyasha the Movie: Fire on the Mystic Island | Sango | | |
| 2005 | Fullmetal Alchemist the Movie: Conqueror of Shamballa | Rosé Thomas | | |
| 2005 | Naruto the Movie: Legend of the Stone of Gelel | Ranke | | |
| 2007 | Chō Gekijōban Keroro Gunsō 2: Shinkai no Princess de Arimasu! | Meru | | |
| 2008 | Detective Conan: Full Score of Fear | Reiko Akiba | | |
| 2009 | Macross Frontier: Itsuwari no Utahime | Canaria Berstein | | |
| 2009 | Yona Yona Penguin | Bad kid 悪ガキ | | |
| 2010 | Keroro Gunso the Super Movie: Creation! Ultimate Keroro, Wonder Space-Time Island | Fuyuki Hinata | | |
| 2010 | HeartCatch PreCure! the Movie: Fashion Show in the Flower Capital... Really?! | Itsuki Myoudouin / Cure Sunshine | | |
| 2011 | Macross Frontier: Sayonara no Tsubasa | Canaria Berstein | | |
| 2011 | Pretty Cure All Stars DX3: Deliver the Future! The Rainbow-Colored Flower That Connects the World | Itsuki Myoudouin / Cure Sunshine | | |
| 2011 | Dragon Ball: Episode of Bardock | Berry | | |
| 2012 | The Tibetan Dog | Norb ノルブ | | |
| 2012 | Pretty Cure All Stars New Stage: Friends of the Future | Itsuki Myoudouin / Cure Sunshine | | |
| 2012 | Guskō Budori no Denki | School teacher | | |
| 2013 | Star Driver The Movie | Midori Okamoto | | |
| 2003 | RahXephon: Pluralitas Concentio | Quon Kisaragi | | |
| 2013 | Hakuōki Dai-isshō Kyoto Ranbu | Chizuru Yukimura | | |
| 2014 | Hakuōki Dai-nishō Shikon Sōkyū | Chizuru Yukimura | | |
| 2014 | Star Blazers: Space Battleship Yamato 2199 | Yuki Mori | Film series | |
| 2015 | Pretty Cure All Stars: Carnival of Spring | Itsuki Myoudouin / Cure Sunshine | | |
| 2017 | Space Battleship Yamato 2202: Warriors of Love | Yuki Mori | | |
| 2020 | Kono Sekai no Tanoshimikata: Secret Story Film | Tae Someya | | |
| 2021 | Tropical-Rouge! Pretty Cure: Yuki no Princess to Kiseki no Yubiwa! | Itsuki Myoudouin / Cure Sunshine | | |
| 2022 | One Piece Film: Red | Sunny-Kun | | |
| 2024 | Mobile Suit Gundam SEED Freedom | Agnes Giebenrath | | |
| 2026 | Shin Gekijōban Keroro Gunsō: Fukkatsu Shite Sokkō Chikyū Metsubō no Kiki de Arimasu! | Fuyuki Hinata | | |

=== Video games ===
List of voice performances in video games
| Year | Title | Role | Notes | Source |
|---|---|---|---|---|
| 1994 | Power Dolls 2 ja:POWER DoLLS 2 | Millisent · Evans ミリセント・エヴァンス | PS1 / PS2 | |
| 1997 | Money Idol Exchanger | Seshil Pound / Eldylabor | Neo Geo MVS | |
| 1997 | Gegege no Kitaro | Boy, Sister Taeko | PS1 / PS2 | |
| 1997–1999 | Martian Successor Nadesico games | Yurika Misumaru | | |
| 1997 | Langrisser IV | Angelina | SS | |
| 1998 | Mitsumete Knight | Rory Colewell ロリィ・コールウェル | PS1 / PS2 | |
| 1998 | Destrega | Celia | PS2 | |
| 1998 | Metal Gear Solid | Mei Ling | PS1 | |
| 1999 | Soulcalibur | Seong Mi-na | DC | |
| 2000 | Haruka: Beyond the Stream of Time | Ran Morimura | PS1 / PS2 | |
| 2000 | Sentimental Graffiti 2 | Yoichi Yamamoto 山本紅一 | DC | |
| 2001 | Kessen II | Western whirlwind 西旋風 | PS1 / PS2 | |
| 2001 | Summon Night 2 | Amer | PS2 | |
| 2001 | Metal Gear Solid 2: Sons of Liberty | Mei Ling | PS2 | |
| 2001 | Dead or Alive 3 | Kasumi | | |
| 2001 | Legaia 2: Duel Saga | Maya | PS1 / PS2 | |
| 2002 | Harukanaru Toki no Naka de 2 | Taira no Chitose | PS1 / PS2 | |
| 2002 | Azumanga Daioh games | Kagura | PS1 / PS2 | |
| 2002 | X | Satsuki Yatōji | PS1 / PS2 | |
| 2001–2004 | Inuyasha games | Sango | PS1 / PS2 | |
| 2003 | Dead or Alive Xtreme Beach Volleyball | Kasumi | | |
| 2003 | Soulcalibur II | Seong Mi-na | PS2 | |
| 2003 | Chobits games | Minoru Kokubunji | PS1 / PS2 | |
| 2003–2016 | Quiz Magic Academy games | Rukia | arcade | |
| 2003 | Summon Night 3 | Amer | PS2 | |
| 2003 | RahXephon games | Quon Kisaragi | PS2 | |
| 2003 | Tales of Symphonia | Presea Combatir | | |
| 2004 | Flame of Recca: Final Burning | Kagurazaka | PS2 | |
| 2004 | The Twelve Kingdoms | Sho | PS2 | |
| 2004 | Shin Megami Tensei: Digital Devil Saga games | Sera | PS2 | |
| 2004 | Fullmetal Alchemist 2: Curse of the Crimson Elixir | Rose | PS2 | |
| 2004, 2006 | Meine Liebe games | Wilhelmina ヴェルヘルミーネ | PS2 | |
| 2004 | Tales of Symphonia | Presea Combatir | PS1 / PS2 | |
| 2004 | Dead or Alive Ultimate | Kasumi | | |
| 2004 | Magna Carta | Serina, fake Amira セリナ/偽のアミラ | PS2, also Portable in 2006 | |
| 2004 | Lupin the Third games | Nadia | PS2 | |
| 2004 | Zatch Bell! games | Kolulu | PS2 | |
| 2004 | Metal Gear Solid 3: Snake Eater | Para-Medic | PS2 | |
| 2004 | Harukanaru Toki no Naka de 3 | Kajiwara Saku | PS2, also Ultimate in 2017 | |
| 2005 | Haruka: Beyond the Stream of Time ~Hachiyosho~ | Ran | PS1 / PS2 | |
| 2005 | Soulcalibur III | Seong Mi-na | PS2 | |
| 2005 | Dead or Alive 4 | Kasumi | Xbox 360 | |
| 2006 | Clannad | Tomoyo Sakagami | PS2, also 2014 revival | |
| 2006 | Another Century's Episode 2 | Yurika Misumaru | from Martian Successor Nadesico; PS2 | |
| 2006 | Wrestle Angels Survivor | Megumi Muto, Makoto Kondo 武藤めぐみ/近藤真琴 | PS1 / PS2 | |
| 2006 | Haruka: Beyond the Stream of Time: Maihitoyo | Ran | PS2 | |
| 2006 | .hack//G.U. Vol. 2//Reminisce | Sophora 槐 | PS1 / PS2 | |
| 2006 | Blue Dragon | Zola ゾラ | Xbox 360 | |
| 2006 | Metal Gear Solid: Portable Ops | Para-Medic | PSP | |
| 2007 | Shining Force EXA | Cyril | PS2 | |
| 2007 | D. Gray-man: God's Apostles | Lala | DS | |
| 2007 | Shining Wind | Xecty Ein | PS2 | |
| 2007–2008 | Eternal Sonata games | Viola | Xbox 360 | |
| 2007 | Kekkaishi games | Yomi Kasuga | Wii | |
| 2007 | Star Ocean: First Departure | Mavelle Froesson | PSP | |
| 2008 | Super Smash Bros. Brawl | Mei Ling | Wii | |
| 2008 | Valkyria Chronicles | Isara Gunther | PS3 | |
| 2008 | Metal Gear Solid 4: Guns of the Patriots | Mei Ling | PS3 | |
| 2008 | Haruka: Beyond the Stream of Time 4 | Nanohime 一ノ姫 | PS2, Wii | |
| 2008 | Tales of Symphonia: Dawn of the New World | Presea Combatir | Wii | |
| 2008 | The Legend of Heroes: Trails in the Sky the 3rd | Ries Argent | PSP | |
| 2008 | Castlevania: Order of Ecclesia | Shanoa | DS | |
| 2009 | Castlevania Judgment | Shanoa | Wii | |
| 2009 | Fragile Dreams: Farewell Ruins of the Moon | Seto | Wii | |
| 2009 | Tales of the World: Radiant Mythology 2 | Presea Combatir | PSP | |
| 2009 | Bamboo Blade | Miyako Miyazaki | PSP | |
| 2009 | Tales of Versus | Presea Combatir | PSP | |
| 2010 | Valkyria Chronicles 2' | Isara Gunther | PSP | |
| 2010 | Sgt. Frog games | Fuyuki Hyuga | DS | |
| 2010 | God of War 3 | Pandora | PS3 | |
| 2010 | Fist of the North Star: Ken's Rage | Yuria | PS3, Xbox 360 | |
| 2010 | Dead or Alive Paradise | Kasumi | PSP | |
| 2010 | Castlevania: Harmony of Despair | Shanoa | Xbox 360, PS3 | |
| 2010 | Another Century's Episode: R | Canaria Berstein | PS3 | |
| 2010–2015 | Hakuoki games | Chizuru Yukimura | PS2 | |
| 2010 | Gran Turismo 5 | Narrator | PS3 | |
| 2010 | Shining Hearts | Kaguya | PSP | |
| 2010 | Castlevania: Lords of Shadow | Carmilla | Xbox 360 | |
| 2011 | Valkyria Chronicles 3 | Isara Gunther | PSP | |
| 2011 | Macross Triangle Frontier | Canaria Berstein, Nanase Matsuura | PSP | |
| 2011 | Tales of the World: Radiant Mythology 3 | Presea Combatir | PSP | |
| 2011 | Star Driver games | Midori Okamoto (Prof. Green) | PSP | |
| 2011 | Dead or Alive: Dimensions | Kasumi | 3DS | |
| 2012 | Genso Suikoden: Tsumugareshi Hyakunen no Toki | Luseri, Ouya | PSP | |
| 2012 | One Piece: Pirate Warriors | Merry | PS3 | |
| 2012 | Shining Blade | Roselinde, Ein Xecty | PSP | |
| 2012 | Oreimo | Kaori Makishima | PSP | |
| 2012 | The Legend of Nayuta: Boundless Trails | Eartha Herschel | PSP | |
| 2012 | Dead or Alive 5 | Kasumi | PS3, Xbox 360 | |
| 2012 | Girl Friend BETA | Shinobu Kokonoe | Smartphone app | |
| 2012 | Project X Zone | Cyrille | 3DS from Shining Force EXA | |
| 2012–2013 | Fist of the North Star: Ken's Rage | Yuria, Shiva | PS3, Xbox 360, other | |
| 2013 | Shining Ark | Panis Angelicus | PSP | |
| 2013 | Warriors Orochi 3 Ultimate | Kasumi | PS3, PS Vita | |
| 2013 | God Eater 2 | Yuno Ashihara | PSP, other | |
| 2014 | Hero Bank | Ai Gōshō | 3DS | |
| 2014 | The Legend of Heroes: Trails to Azure Evolution | Ries Argent | Other | |
| 2014 | Phantasy Star Online 2 | Katori | PC, PS4, PSV | |
| 2014 | Tales of the World: Reve Unitia | Presea Combatir | 3DS | |
| 2014 | Shining Resonance ja:シャイニング・レゾナンス | Beatrice · Irma ベアトリス・イルマ | PS3 | |
| 2015 | Dragon Ball Xenoverse | Female Time Patroller Voice 5 | PS3, other | |
| 2015 | Dead or Alive 5: Last Round | Kasumi, Phase-4 | PS3, other | |
| 2015 | Xenoblade Chronicles X | Elma | Wii U | |
| 2015 | Cross Ange | Vivivan | | |
| 2015 | Blade Arcus from Shining EX | Roselinde | PS3, other | |
| 2016 | Summon Night 6 | Amer | | |
| 2016 | Dead or Alive Xtreme 3 games | Kasumi | Fortune and Venus Vacation | |
| 2016 | Dragon Ball Xenoverse 2 | Female Time Patroller Voice 5 | PS4, Xbox One, Other | |
| 2016 | World of Final Fantasy | Celes Chere セリス | Other | |
| 2017 | Musou Stars | Kasumi | PS4, PS Vita | |
| 2017 | Dissidia Final Fantasy Opera Omnia | Celes Chere | Android, iOS | |
| 2017 | Xenoblade Chronicles 2 | Elma | Nintendo Switch | |
| 2018 | Dragon Ball FighterZ | Android 21 | PS4, Xbox One, Microsoft Windows | |
| 2018 | Octopath Traveler | Primrose Azelhart | Nintendo Switch | |
| 2018 | Super Smash Bros. Ultimate | Mei Ling | Nintendo Switch | |
| 2019 | Dead or Alive 6 | Kasumi, Phase 4 | PC, PS4, Xbox One | |
| 2019 | Another Eden | Elga | Android, iOS, Nintendo Switch | |
| 2020 | Arknights | Eunectes | Android, iOS | |
| 2021 | The King of Fighters All Star | Kasumi | Android, iOS | |
| 2023 | Honkai: Star Rail | Jingliu | Android, PC, iOS, PS5 | |
| 2025 | Genshin Impact | Lauma | Android, PC, iOS, PS5 | |
| 2026 | Arknights: Endfield | Zhuang Fangyi | Android, PC, iOS, PS5 | |
| 2026 | Dissidia Duellum Final Fantasy | Celes Chere | Android, iOS | |

=== Tokusatsu ===
List of voice performances Tokusatsu
| Year | Title | Role | Notes | Source |
|---|---|---|---|---|
| 1999 | Barasa de Booska | Narrator | | |
| 2020-21 | Mashin Sentai Kiramager | Queen Mabayuine | Episodes 22, 23 & 45; Also in Be Bop Dream. | |

=== Drama CD ===
List of voice performances in drama CD and radio
| Year | Title | Role | Notes | Source |
|---|---|---|---|---|
| 2000 | Doll Suspension Ayatsuri Sora Elementary Original Drama Album II "Gaiden Rengoku Kinbaku Kinboku Hell" 人形草紙あやつり左近 オリジナルドラマアルバムII「外伝 怨恋振袖業火地獄」 | Amemiya Winter Season 雨宮冬季 | | |
| 2000 | Icarus' birthday イカロスの誕生日 | Flexible 自在はるか | Radio | |
| 2003 | In autumn cherry blossoms ja:秋桜の空に | Sakurabashi Suka 桜橋涼香 | | |
| 2007 | City Busters シティーバスターズ | Misaki Okaki 岬ゆい | Radio | |
| 2008 | Night on the Galactic Railroad | Kahoru / sensei / Maruso かほる/先生/マルソ | | |
| 2009 | Miyazawa Kenji Monogatari – Rain Nimomakezuzu ~ 宮沢賢治物語～雨ニモマケズ～ | Toshi Miyazawa / Sato Tae 宮沢トシ/佐藤タエ | | |
| 2010 | MM! | Michiru Oni 鬼瓦みちる | | |
| 2011 | Keiji | Tosha 利沙 | Radio | |
| 2012 | Two-minute adventure 二分間の冒険 | Kaori かおり | Radio | |
| 2013 | New World ニューワールド | Lily リリィ | Radio | |
| 2001–2002 | Scrapped Princess | Pacifica Casull | 6 part drama CD series | |
| 2004 | The Gentlemen's Alliance Cross | Otaniya Haine 乙宮灰音 | | |

=== Other dubbing ===
List of voice performances in overseas dubbing
| Title | Role | Dub for | Notes | Source |
|---|---|---|---|---|
| Battle of the Sexes | Marilyn Barnett | Andrea Riseborough | | |
| CSI: Crime Scene Investigation | Morgan Brody | Elisabeth Harnois | | |
| Doubt | Sister James | Amy Adams | | |
| Ender's Game | Alai | Suraj Parthasarathy | | |
| Flyboys | Lucienne | Jennifer Decker | | |
| Genius | Mileva Marić, Dora Maar | Samantha Colley | | |
| Me Too, Flower! | Cha Bong-sun | Lee Ji-ah | | |
| Out of Reach | Irena Morawska | Ida Nowakowska | | |
| Pirates of the Caribbean: On Stranger Tides | Syrena | Astrid Berges-Frisbey | | |
| Power Rangers Samurai | Lauren Shiba/Red Samurai Ranger | Kimberley Crossman | | |
| Sungkyunkwan Scandal | Kim Yoon-hee | Park Min-young | | |
| The Virgin Suicides | Cecilia Lisbon | Hanna R. Hall | | |
| W.I.T.C.H | Wilhelmina "Will" Vandom | Kelly Stables | | |
| X-Men: First Class | Moira MacTaggert | Rose Byrne | | |
| X-Men: Apocalypse | Moira MacTaggert | Rose Byrne | | |
