= Wonderful World (2010 film) =

- Directed by: Daisuke Namikawa
- Starring: Mamoru Miyano; Ayumi Uehara; Daisuke Namikawa; Yuka Hirata
- Production company: Evergreen Project
- Release date: June 19, 2010
- Country: Japan
- Language: Japanese

Wonderful World is a 2010 Japanese fantasy drama film directed by Daisuke Namikawa. It features Japanese voice actors known for their work in anime appearing in live-action roles.

== Cast ==
- Seishi Katayama – Mamoru Miyano
- Narumi Fukushima – Ayumi Uehara
- Koichi Katayama – Daisuke Namikawa
- Akiko Tanaka – Yuka Hirata
- Ryoji Nakamura – Showtaro Morikubo
- Chin'nen – Tomokazu Sugita
- Shaki Mikami – Yuko Kaida
- Jiro Kumada – Tsuyoshi Koyama
- Daejeon Shunsuke – Yumehito Moroboshi (Ayabie)
- Residents of heme MR0 – Tomokazu Seki
- Minami Satoko – Miki Nagasawa
- Maya Tenmura –Mitsuki Saiga
- Kozo Tajima – Anri Katsu
- Nagaoka Clinic Nurse – Fuyuka Oura
- Contact Lunch Vendor – Yurie Kobori
- Tatsuoki – Mafia Kajita
- Atsushi Ito – Rikiya Koyama
- Yoshidaka Nishikawa – Keiji Fujiwara
- Kizaki Junichiro – Kouichi Yamadera
- Ryūtoki Genninji and Yumezo Kijima – Kenji Utsumi (2 roles)
