= Yurie Kobori =

Japanese actress

- 小堀 友里絵
- Born: July 19, 1983 (age 43); Fukushima Prefecture, Japan
- Occupations: Actress; voice actress
- Years active: 2000-present
- Agent: Air Agency
- Height: 161 cm (5 ft 3 in)

Yurie Kobori (小堀 友里絵, Kobori Yurie; born July 19, 1983) is a Japanese actress and voice actress from Fukushima Prefecture, Japan. She is affiliated with Air Agency.

== Filmography ==
=== Anime ===
2010

- A Certain Scientific Railgun as Sightseer (ep 20)
- Kakko Kawaii Sengen as Narrator

2011

- Beelzebub as Sachura
- Ben-To as Nurse B (ep 8); Pharmacist (ep 11)
- Kakko Kawaii Sengen Season 2 as Narration
- Wandering Son as Saori's Mother; female teacher; girl B (11)

2012

- AKB0048 as Mother (ep 6)
- Beelzebub as Female Student B (ep 54)
- Black Rock Shooter as Female Student (ep 3); Junior (ep 4)
- Lagrange: The Flower of Rin-ne as Rui Senzai (ep 9)
- Shirokuma Cafe as High schooler
- Waiting in the Summer as Teacher B (ep 1)

2013

- A Town Where You Live
- Odoriko Clinoppe as Rival-chan
- Red Data Girl as Mikoto Kanzaki
- Valvrave the Liberator Season 2 as Student (ep 16)

2014

- 47 Todōfuken R as Fukushima Dog
- Pocket Monsters: XY as Shauna/Sana
- The Seven Deadly Sins as Cenette
- Tokyo Ghoul as Kimi Nishino; Woman on the street (ep 7); Newscaster (ep 9); Haru (ep 11); Kaneki (child; ep 12)
- World Trigger as Futatsugi; Citizen (ep 5)
- Yo-Kai Watch as Shiori Nakamura; Fortune-teller; woman

2015

- Gate: Jieitai Kano Chi nite, Kaku Tatakaeri as Female University Student (ep 10)
- Tokyo Ghoul √A as Kimi Nishino (ep 8); Ruisawa (ep 7)
- World Trigger as Mira; Newbie team member (ep 17); Announcer (eps 19-20); Reporter (ep 37)

2016

- Kabaneri of the Iron Fortress as Shigeo (ep 5)
- Pocket Monsters: XY&Z as Shauna/Sana
- World Trigger as Hikari Nire
- Yo-Kai Watch as Koichi

2017

- Chaos;Child as Female Teacher
- Crayon Shin-chan as Female clerk, lady in line

2018

- Tokyo Ghoul:re Second Season as Kimi Nishino
- Yo-Kai Watch Shadowside as Azusa, Izumi, Schoolgirl A, Girl, Hinako

2019

- GeGeGe no Kitarō (6th Season) as Kiyomi Kanai (ep 45)
- Hulaing Babies as Kohara-sensei

2020

- Uchitama?! Have you seen my Tama? as onee-san

2022

- Slow Loop as Homeroom Teacher

2023

- Shimajirō no Wow! as Museum staff

=== OVA ===
2014

- Kuroko's Basketball 41.5
- Yondemasuyo, Azazel-san

=== Anime Film ===
2012

- Kappa no Suribachi as Matahachi

2014

- Yo-Kai Watch: Tanjō no Himitsu da Nyan!

=== Drama CD ===
2011

- Hanasaku Iroha Drama CD ~after days~ as Misaki, child
- My Little Monster as Saeko-Senpai

2012

- Taiyō no Ie as Mrs. Motomiya

2014

- Sherlock Holmes as Mary Sutherland

2015

- From Five to Nine as Momoe Yamabuchi

=== Live Action Film ===
2010

- Wonderful World as Bentō vendor
- Nichijou End as Miyuki

2013

- Death & Tanya as Miyuki Taniya

2017

- Tokidoki Meguri Everyday

=== Video games ===
2008

- Akai Ito DS ~Destiny~

2010

- Uragiri wa Boku no Namae wo Shitteiru -Tasogare ni ochita inori- as College student, lecturer
- Class of Heroes 2G as Fran

2011

- A Certain Scientific Railgun as Sanctions guide
- Mōjūdzukai to ōji-sama ~Snow Bride~

2013

- Hissatsu Shigotonin ~Oshioki Collection~ as Makoto Fuefuki

2014

- Heroes Placement as Himawari Minamisōma

2015

- Uchi no Hime-sama ga Ichiban Kawaii as Perisha Blue

2023

- Monster Strike as Zantman
- Saint Seiya Shining Soldiers as Urites
- Yo-kai Watch Busters as Sam

=== Commercial ===
2008

- Mitsubishi Electric Building Techno-Service
- American Home Assurance Company

Unknown date

- Shueisha "Super Dash & Go!" (Narration)
- Kakkokawaii Sengen! (Narration)

=== Overseas Dubbing ===
2015

- Ribbit as Sandy

Unknown date

- Chained
- Stray (2019)
- Team Umizoomi
- The Gaelic King

=== Voice Over ===
2011

- Future Century Zipangu

=== Webcomic ===
+Voice

2007

- Musashino-sen no Shimai as Shizuru Munakata

2008

- Hitomi no Photograph as Yui Ichinomiya

=== Other ===
- Little Wonders: Sneeze as Arthur
