= Miruru =

Miruru may refer to:

- Miruru (Onegai), an artificial intelligence from the anime Onegai Teacher
- Miruru (Sgt. Frog), a character from the third Sgt. Frog anime movie
