= Keroro Land =

Manga magazine

- Genre: Drama, Comedy, Science fiction
- Manga
- Written by: Mine Yoshizaki
- Published by: Kadokawa Shoten
- Original run: 2005 – 2013
- Volumes: 42

Keroro Land is a spin-off shōnen manga magazine of the popular manga and anime series Sgt. Frog. The first characters originating from Keroro Land, the Shurara Corps, have appeared in the anime.

== Story ==
Keroro Land is a children's magazine that is focused on the anime and manga series Sgt. Frog. The magazines contain games, previews of future episodes, advertisements for merchandise, and even a section of yonkoma comics drawn by several well-known dōjinshi artists. The magazine also contains a section where children can send in drawings of their own Keronian creations and the winning entries are drawn by Mine Yoshizaki. Although it is unknown what the winning entries were going to be used for, a card game entitled Anokoro Keroro Gunso was created where some of the winning Keronian designs were used as characters. Some of these characters also made it into the Anime series.

The card game is a prequel that revolves around the original Keroro Platoon's first real mission. Keroro, Giroro, Zeroro, Firuru and Zoruru form their own teams and split up to fight for the Keron Star, eventually facing the Black Stars, a team bent on conquering Keron. There were three collections of cards released, each one divided in "seasons".

== Anokoro Keroro Gunso Characters ==
=== 1st season ===
- Keroro: The main character of the series. His helmet is gray and his yellow star has red traces. Starting in the "second season", the second batch of cards, his primary vehicle is the AKR-SP, a hover bike.
  - Team Keroro / Keroro and Happy Friends
    - Toriri: An owl-like Keronian.
    - Saruru: A monkey-like Keronian.
    - Nuii: A Nuii doll brought to life by Kururu. Different from the Nuii who appeared in the anime.
    - Inunu: A dog-like Keronian.
- Giroro: Second in command of the Keroro Platoon. He wears a red jungle camo helmet and lacks his scar and weapon belt. His skull symbol is also on his stomach. Starting in the "second season", the second batch of cards, his vehicle is the Type G66, a small red tank.
  - Team Giroro / T.A.S.T.
    - Aruru: A nurse Keronian.
    - Mukaka: A short-tempered Keronian.
    - Hanana: A flower Keronian.
    - Eruru: A designer of the Keronian army.
- Zeroro: Dororo during his assassin status. Starting in the "second season", the second batch of cards, his form of transportation is the Falcon, a glider in the form of a shuriken.
  - Team Zeroro / Team Assassin
    - Tsunene: A fox-like Keronian.
    - Tanunu: A Tanuki like Keronian.
    - Rirara: A Keronian kunoichi.
    - Fuwawa:
- Zoruru: Zeroro's unknown rival.
  - Team Zoruru
    - Goruru: A golem Keronian.
    - Zarara: A sand granite Keronian.
    - Dokuku: Future member of the Shurara Corps.
    - Mokuku: A Keronian made of gas
- Firuru: A soccer-loving Keronian with a bandanna and a band-aid on his nose.
  - Team Firuru / Sporty
    - Piroro: A red and black Keronian clown.
    - Metoto: A dark blue Football-loving Keronian
    - Besusu: A gray Baseball-loving Keronian
    - Pokaka: A light brown Keronian boxer
- 556: A human-looking alien wearing a futuristic helmet, a torn school uniform and a metallic sword, resembling a gang member.
  - Team 556 / Metal Souls
    - Lavie: 556's sister. No different from her future self.
    - Mahaha: A black Keronian with a hover bike.
    - Putata: A yellow Keronian painter. Future Shurara Corps member.
    - Gitata: A yellow Keronian guitarist.
- Madodo: A mad scientist. Creator of the Robobo robots.
  - Team Madodo / Mad Mechanics
    - Robobo M: A Robobo with magnets for hands and feet.
    - Robobo E: A Robobo with electric outlets for hands and feet. It has to be recharged and uses a lot of energy.
    - Robobo D: A Robobo with drills for hands and feet.
    - Robobo P: A Robobo with propellers for hands and feet.
- Metata: A Keronian cyborg. Starting in the second season, he uses a hover board called Ω. He's the leader of the villainous group Blac Stars. When out of battle, initially they all wear white clothes covering their entire body, with a black star emblem on their chest.
- Black Stars
  - Chanana: A Keronian resembling a chinese vampire.
  - Kabubu: A kabuki Keronian.
  - Myouu A Keronian monk.

=== 2nd season ===
- Keroro: Starting in the "second season", the second batch of cards, his primary vehicle is the AKR-SP, a hover bike.
- Giroro: Starting in the "second season", the second batch of cards, his vehicle is the Type G66, a small red tank.
- Zeroro: Starting in the "second season", the second batch of cards, his form of transportation is the Falcon, a glider in the form of a shuriken.
- Metata: Starting in the second season, he uses a hover board called Ω.
- Black Stars
  - Mahaha: A red hover biker. Initially 556's ally, but eventually reveals his true identity and appearance (his name changes to a Kanji spelling and his color to red) and joins the Black Stars.

=== 3rd season ===
- Corporal Garuru: Keronian army member.
- Major Kururu: A young Keronian, but already a high-ranking officer. Built a living Nuii doll.
- Tamama: A young Keronian who still hadn't joined the army. He had a light blue cap.
- Metata: Starting in the second season, he uses a hover board called Ω.
- Black Stars
  - Mahaha: A red hover biker. Initially 556's ally, but eventually reveals his true identity and appearance (his name changes to a Kanji spelling and his color to red) and joins the Black Stars.
- Kagege: Another Keronian assassin, leading a team of monsters.
- Kagege Platoon
  - Mekeke: A Keronian puppeteer able to control other Keronians.
  - Yukiki: A snowman Keronian.
  - Ushishi: A tribal Keronian with horns.
  - Takoko: An octopus Keronian.

== List of Keroro Land Keronians ==
The following is a list of every Keronian featured in Keroro Land. Some went on to appear in the Keroro anime. But the rest of the Keronians never appeared in any official story or manga. Each Keroro Land volume has 3 new featured Keronians, but sometimes 4 in each.

- Winter Edition
  - Saruru: A monkey Keronian. Appears in Anokoro Keroro Gunso.
  - Aruru: A blue Keronian nurse. Appears in Anokoro Keroro Gunso.
  - Gururu: A Keronian sheriff.
- Summer Edition
  - Geruru: A liquid Keronian. Renamed to Giruru, appears in the Keroro anime episodes 159, 169 and 177.
  - Hanana: A flower loving Keronian. She has pink skin and her tail resembles a leaf.
  - Robobo: A robotic Keronian. Appeared in the anime, episode 185, and several variations were in Anokoro Keroro Gunso.
- Volume 1
  - Gororo: An electric oni Keronian.
  - Eruru: A designer of the Keronian army.
  - Goruru: A golem Keronian.
- Volume 2
  - Merara: A Keronian with fire powers. Red with a black eyepatch.
  - Dokuku: A gas Keronian. Appeared in episodes 159 and 177 of the anime as Giruru's brother.
  - Rirara: A Keronian kunoichi.
- Volume 3
  - Metata: A Keronian cyborg. Main antagonist in Anokoro Keroro Gunso.
  - Samama: A Keronian Natsumi. Her mark is a stylized yellow "N".
  - Oyoyo: A Keronian swimmer.
- Volume 4
  - Nyonyo: A Keronian Nyororo. An experiment of the Keronian army.
  - Piroro: A Keronian clown.
  - Nuii: A doll Keronian. Appeared in episodes 159 and 188 of the anime.
- Volume 5
  - Firuru: A Keronian soccer player.
  - Putata: A Keronian crazy artist. Appeared in episodes 159 and 161 of the anime.
  - Toriri: An owl Keronian.
- Volume 6
  - Gitata: A Keronian guitarist.
  - Mahaha: A Keronian hover biker.
  - Mukaka: A young and short tempered Keronian.
- Volume 7
  - Foruru: A Keronian cyborg with a human appearance. His story is based on Kamen Rider.
  - Shisusu: A female Keronian witch. Foruru's helper.
  - Shurara: A Keronian knight. Appeared in episodes 159, 202 and 203 of the Keroro anime.
- Volume 8
  - Gyororo: A Keronian with multiple eyes around his body. Appeared in episodes 159, 161 and 188.
  - Purara: A Venus Flytrap Keronian.
  - Kuwawa: A Keronian insect collector.
- Volume 9
  - Farara: A Keronian mummy.
  - Chanana: A Keronian jiangshi.
  - Kagege: A Keronian assassin with shadow techniques. Appeared in episodes 159 and 202 of the Keroro anime.
- Volume 10
  - Ushishi: A tribal Keronian.
  - Ripopo: A Keronian reporter who invades people's privacy.
  - Joriri: A Keronian vagabond. Debuted in episode 162 of the anime, becoming a recurring character.
- Volume 11
  - Mekeke: A puppeteer Keronian. Appeared in episode 159 and 161 of the anime.
  - Yukiki: A snowman Keronian. Appeared in episode 202 of the anime.
  - Pamumu: A panda Keronian. Has inverted skin colors compared to a standard Keronian.
- Volume 12
  - Kanene: A yellow Keronian who gives coins.
  - Myouu: A Keronian monk.
  - Kabubu: A Kabuki practitioner Keronian.
- Volume 13
  - Utata: A Keronian guitarist with tropical clothes.
  - Takoko: An Octopus Keronian.
  - Patete: A Keronian cooker.
- Volume 14
  - Rifufu: Original name was Hapapa. A green Keronian with a large leaf on his head.
  - Forere: Original name was Moriri. An all green Keronian surrounded with shrubbery.
  - Pegigi: A sky blue Keronian with yellow beak and a blue hat.
- Volume 15
  - Furara: A Keronian based on Frankenstein's monster.
  - Yobobo: An old man Keronian with a large mustache and eyebrows.
  - Kyurara: A vampire bat Keronian.
- Volume 16
  - Nababa: A banana collector Keronian.
  - Kariri: A curry loving Keronian.
  - Rajiji: A Keronian genie.
- Volume 17
  - Nyugaga: A white and blue mutant Keronian.
  - Monono: Original name was Kuroro. A monochromatic Keronian.
  - Yotsutsu: A green and yellow Keronian with what resemble four-leaf clover leaves on its head.
- Volume 18
  - Desusu: A dark blue Keronian with a white hat and the Japanese hiragana A (あ) as its symbol.
  - Hikaka: A flame Keronian.
  - Bororo: A light-tan tattered Keronian. The name comes from boroboro (ぼろぼろ), meaning worn-out.
- Volume 19
  - Kunono: A green kunoichi Keronian.
  - Beriri: A red, berry-themed Keronian. She has strawberries on her head.
  - Supapa: A dark blue superhero Keronian with a red cape and red boots.
- Volume 20
  - Torara: A tiger Keronian.
  - Jizozo: A jizou statue Keronian.
  - Kyububu: A cubic Keronian.
- Volume 21
  - Maii: A blue, snail Keronian.
  - Patsutsu: A green Keronian that wears underwear.
  - Ididi: An Indian Keronian.
- Volume 22
  - Warara: A red geisha Keronian .
  - Myujiji: A maestro Keronian.
  - Tonana: A brave Keronian with a sword and shield.
- Volume 23
  - Urara: A Keronian foreseer.
  - Poriri: A Keronian policeman.
  - Hiroro: Originally named Kameme. A Keronian masked super hero.
- Volume 24
  - Pekeke: A lazy Keronian student.
  - Herara: A Keronian gladiator.
  - Sejuju: A Keronian mystic.
- Volume 25
  - Barara: A rose Keronian.
  - Shihaha: A Keronian that resembles Jason.
  - Shimama: Spelled as シママ, a yellow-black sharp cat Keronian.
- Volume 26
  - Kagigi: A key Keronian.
  - Buroro: A block Keronian.
  - Rakiki: A Keronian cheerleader.
- Volume 27
  - Uroro & Rokoko: A pair of twin Keronian fishes.
  - Churiri: A Keronian that resembles Chun-Li.
  - Gachacha: A capsule toy Keronian.
- Volume 28
  - Gurere: A magma Keronian.
  - Zakoko: A Keronian wearing a spacesuit.
  - Bototo: A mineral water bottle Keronian.
- Volume 29
  - Mekuku: A make-up Keronian.
  - Kabobo: A pumpkin-headed Keronian.
  - Chibibi: A team of tiny Keronians.
- Volume 30
  - Ameme: A pink candy Keronian.
  - Edodo: An evil Keronian that resembles Keroro.
  - Juee: A jewelry Keronian.
- Volume 31
  - Chakuku: A zipper Keronian.
  - Harere: A yellow wispy Keronian.
  - Rububu: A Keronian with a head that resembles a Rubik's Cube.
- Volume 32
  - Enunu and Esusu: A pair of twin magnet Keronians.
  - Kopopo: A boombox Keronian.
  - Hevivi: A blue-armored Keronian.
- Volume 33
  - Shisasa: A red-browed Shishi-like Keronian.
  - Shishishi: A blue-browed Shishi-like Keronian.
  - Shogigi: A shogi Keronian.
  - Tsurara: A Keronian Yuki-Onna.
- Volume 34
  - Komama: A top Keronian.
  - Shimama: Spelled as しまま, an island Keronian.
  - Sumimi: A black ink Keronian.
- Volume 35
  - Amimi: A yarn Keronian.
  - Wiruru: A virus Keronian.
  - Munn: A Moon Keronian.
- Volume 37
  - Keii: A female cybernetic Keronian.
  - Anono: A Keronian maid.
  - Pekeke: A pencil case Keronian.
- Volume 38
  - Kotata: A kotatsu Keronian.
  - Raruru: A coral Keronian.
  - Ariri: A team of ant Keronians.
- Volume 39
  - Erere: A neon Keronian.
  - Shikiki: A team of tiny seasonal Keronians.
  - Mishishi: A green Keronian golem.
- Volume 40
  - Ginunu: A Keronian martial arts master.
  - Chokiki: A Keronian crab.
  - Fuwawa: A Keronian made of bubbles.
- Volume 41
  - Chiyurara: A Keronian dancer.
  - Yadodo: A Keronian hermit crab.
  - Reroro: A Keronian chameleon.
- Volume 42
  - Monana: A cat Keronian.
  - Digugu: A drill Keronian.
  - Kyupipi: A Keronian based on Ms. Claus.
