= List of Sgt. Frog characters =

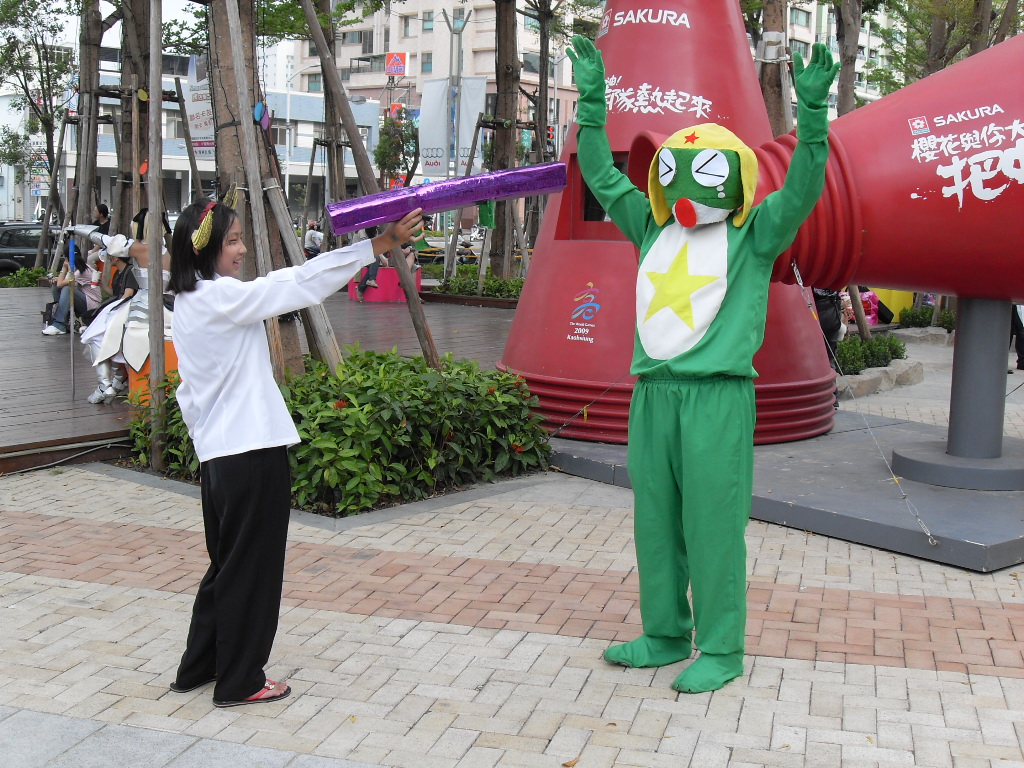
Cosplayers of Fuyuki Hinata and Keroro at Kaohsiung Comic and Animation Exhibition

The following is a list of various characters in the universe of the anime and manga series Sgt. Frog and related works.

== Keroro Platoon ==
The Keroro Platoon (ケロロ小隊, Keroro Shōtai) is led by Sergeant Keroro. While most platoons contain thirty or forty soldiers, the Keroro Platoon only has a meager five. Its full name is the Gamma Planetary System, the 58th Planet, Space Invasion Army Special Tactics Platoon (ガマ星雲 第58番惑星 宇宙侵攻軍特殊先行工作部隊, Gama Seiun Dai Gojūhachiban Wakusei Uchū Shinkōgun Tokushu Senkō Kōsaku Butai). In the anime's English dub, the unit is referred to as the Advance Recon Mission Preparatory Invasion Terror Platoon (A.R.M.P.I.T.). Keroro refers to the acronym as being "unfortunate."

The initial operation of the Keroro Platoon was to stealthily survey Earth and relay information to the awaiting Keron Invasion Army. The five members were dispatched throughout Greater Tokyo and the surrounding areas to assess Earth's weakness and prepare for a total military takeover. Having infiltrated the Hinata house, Sergeant Keroro concealed himself in one of the bedrooms, but was accidentally discovered by the Hinata children, a pair of middle-school siblings. Shocked by their ability to see him, he was overpowered, captured, and temporarily stripped of his weapon, the Kero Ball. With Keroro coming into direct contact with the Earthlings, the invading army lost their surprise element, deemed the campaign compromised, and immediately started withdrawal procedures from Earth's orbit.

Abandoned by the army and without his platoon's support, Keroro must unite his scattered soldiers, survive his prisoner of war manual labor, and outwit his captors. He is eventually connected with his platoon and subsequently given revised orders to continue the invasion campaign but by themselves. They must now fulfill their new mission, protect their human friends, their home base, and the Earth from other alien invaders.

The platoon's hierarchy in military rank is similar to the Army ranks of the Japanese Empire during World War II and have based certain weapons, equipment, and terms after the Imperial Japanese Military, but remains faithful to the perception of the alien invader with higher technological achievements.

=== Keroro ===
Voiced by: Kumiko Watanabe (2004–2026), Makoto Koichi (2026–present) (Japanese); Todd Haberkorn (English, Funimation dub), Chris Cason (English, Funimation dub; pilot voice), Andrea Kwan and Sarah Hauser (English, Animax Asia dub), Vic Mignogna (English, ADV dub pilot, Lucky Star appearance)

Sergeant Keroro (ケロロ軍曹, Keroro Gunsō) is the leader of the Keroro Platoon, evidenced by the leadership star he wears on his belly. He has a green body and wears yellow, Imperial Japanese Army-style headgear with a red star in the middle, symbolizing that he is a leader. When the Keroro Platoon members happen to be caught in an explosion of some kind, they are seen with an afro. Keroro's black afro is most commonly seen.

Keroro used to be a good officer, but since his arrival to Earth and the subsequent loss of his Keroball, he has lost most of his interest in the invasion, preferring to spend his time making Gundam models, watching anime (especially the Space Captain Geroro series, a parody of Space Battleship Yamato), or reading manga. Keroro has lived with the Hinata family in their house since arriving to Earth and often does their house chores.

Although Keroro is seen as weak and lazy by nature since he started living with the Hinatas, he is actually the most powerful and dangerous member of the platoon, becoming severely weakened due to Earth's atmosphere having significantly less moisture than back on Keron. This lack of humidity apparently weakens all Keronians, though Keroro appears to be the only member of the platoon to be significantly affected by this.

Occasionally, specifically, when there is a lot of moisture in the air, Keroro reverts to his previous self, a cold and ruthless soldier with enhanced strength, speed, and the ability to shoot powerful energy blasts from his hands. Though moisture returns him to full power, being exposed to it for too long turns Keroro into a crazed lunatic, causing him to attack everyone and anything in sight. Keroro becomes virtually unstoppable in this state and can easily overpower anyone who tries to stop him, including the members of his platoon and even Natsumi. This usually ends with a Nyororo, a creature that ventures throughout space that seeks out high moisture levels to feed itself, sucking off all of Keroro's moisture.

Keroro is carefree, ignorant, greedy, selfish, vengeful, unlucky, egotistical, smug, and cowardly (especially against Natsumi), with a short attention span for anything not related to Gundam models. However, he occasionally displays bouts of unselfishness and bravery.

He misspends the invasion budget on models, and he always leaves the paperwork for their bosses back in Keron for the last possible moment, often punished for it. The son of an infamous war hero, the Demon Sergeant, Keroro, spent his childhood being raised by his father and was often punished for acting girly or lazy. Keroro's rise through the ranks was partially due to his father's influence within the military, allowing Keroro to do whatever job he wanted. He is childhood friends with platoon members Giroro and Dororo and is responsible for most of the latter's traumas. In some of the movies and other episodes, it is shown that he is good at convincing people.

Keroro's invasion plans often hide personal goals like getting back at Natsumi, raise or to improve his Gundam collection, or even preventing the Earth from being destroyed or conquered by other alien species. Even when they do not, they are often harebrained ideas without a chance of success. His plans also consist of how to distract humans while Keroro invades the Earth. His raising money plans usually follow the same pattern and often involve Momoka hiring them for some crazy goal of her own. The few strategies that have a chance of success usually fail due to setbacks, Fuyuki's friendship appeals, or because another character points out that if Earth is destroyed, it would mean no more Gundam models.

=== Giroro ===
Voiced by: Jōji Nakata (2004–2026), Toshiki Masuda (2026–present) (Japanese), Akiko Hiramatsu (Japanese, child); Christopher Sabat (English, Funimation dub), Scott Evans (English, Animax Asia)

Corporal Giroro (ギロロ伍長, Giroro Gochō) is the Platoon's highly aggressive weapons expert. His body is dark red, while his headgear is dark maroon with a skull in the middle. He is the only member of the platoon who doesn't wear a symbol on his belly. Instead, he wears a belt with a rectangular buckle diagonally across his body. However, when he was a tadpole, he had a skull symbol on his belly. His Afro, which is rarely seen, is blond.

Giroro is the only member of the platoon who takes the invasion of Earth seriously and is often frustrated by the lack of progress made towards accomplishing this mission. Due to Keroro's negligence in his duties as commanding officer, Giriro often acts as the disciplinarian in the platoon, keeping Keroro from ignoring his duties when the later forgets to submit his invasion reports to HQ or is caught spending their invasion budget on schemes that often put them in the red. Despite this, he will follow Keroro's orders, whether or not they make sense as he still holds respect for the chain of command. Giroro once had respect for Keroro as an officer before their mission to Earth and, at one point, attempted to restore Keroro to his former self. However, he soon came to regret it as Keroro had become too powerful for anyone to control.

Though Kururu outranks him, Giroro acts as the de facto second in command after Keroro due to Kururu's volatile personality and laziness. Giroro had displayed outstanding leadership skills at times of crisis and has taken charge of the platoon on more than one occasion when the situation called for it, mostly on combat missions.

Giroro is in love with Natsumi Hinata, something everyone but Natsumi seems to know since she defeated all his traps he set when he arrived at the Hinata house. He attacks anyone who seeks to harm her, even his platoon members. Giroro views Mutsumi Saburo as a robust romantic rival and will do whatever it takes to keep him from getting close to Natsumi even though she is in love with Saburo. Despite being the most dedicated to the invasion of Earth, Giroro's romantic obsession with Natsumi has caused him to abandon his duties on more than one occasion which often end up with Giroro unintentionally botching Keroro's plans of the invasion when they put Natsumi in danger.

Ever since his first encounter with the Hinatas, Giroro has been living in a tent in their backyard, where he roasts sweet potatoes he sometimes shares with Natsumi and obsessively cleans his weapons. The buckle of his belt hides his treasure, a photo of Natsumi. He shares his tent with a whitish-pink female cat he rescued from the rain and named "Miss Furbottom." Unknown to him, Miss Furbottom is in love with Giroro.

Giroro has a short temper. He is often irritated by the laid-back and unfocused attitude towards the invasion of the other members of the Platoon, specially Keroro. He appears to be gruff, but he is an honorable frog with a good heart. He lacks any other hobby apart from his weapons. He is terrified of ghosts and sea cucumbers. He cannot drink more than a drop of alcohol without passing out.

Despite being dedicated to the call of duty, Giroro is often used as comic relief. He is often crushed by something dropped from Natsumi's window or a falling object from space, usually containing an alien of some sort (or Karara). Other times he reluctantly volunteers himself to test Kururu's inventions at Keroro's request in the pursuit of money, which most times leave him injured. His romantic dilemma with Natsumi leaves him clumsy and blundering. His feelings toward her are often used by other characters to get him to agree to something, saying that she will like it.

=== Tamama ===
Voiced by: Etsuko Kozakura (2004–2026), Rika Nagae (2026–present) (Japanese); Brina Palencia (English, Funimation dub)

Private Second Class Tamama (タママ二等兵, Tamama Nitōhei) is ranked Private Second Class in the Keron Army's Keroro Platoon. He is the newest member in the planetary invasion troop and the youngest, still having his tadpole tail and white face. Tamama has a dark blue body with yellow headgear and big round eyes. He wears a green and yellow mark on his head and belly, which matches the Shoshinsha mark that new drivers in Japan must display their cars for one year after obtaining their licenses. His Afro is a reddish-brown.

While usually seen as cute, gentle and cheerful due to his youthful appearance, Tamama becomes an insane, raving maniac when feeling overly excited, angry, or jealous. Tamama is prone to fits of jealousy, usually towards anyone who gets near Keroro, especially Angol Mois, whom he frequently refers to as "that woman" or "this woman." These negative feelings power his energy beam.

Tamama idolizes and has strong feelings towards Keroro, though the latter seems unaware of them. He is usually the first to support Keroro and his plans, no matter how ridiculous they can be. Though he is loyal to Keroro, Tamama's loyalty to him has become shaken when Keroro becomes emotionally abusive or overly lazy, having abandoned his commander on more than one occasion.

Tamama is very close friends with Momoka due to their similar personalities and lives with her in the Nishizawa Estate, much to his Platoon's jealousy. While living with Momoka, Tamama openly enjoys luxury and is very knowledgeable of Momoka's family wealth because of it. Though they got off on the wrong foot, both Tamama and Momoka are very loyal to one another to the point where Tamama will openly go against Keroro if the latter's plans interfere with Momoka's plans to win Fuyuki's heart.

He hates Mois because of Keroro's feelings and trains hard until he defeats her and gains Keroro's affection. However, sometimes he is ashamed of his evilness when faced with Mois's pure heart. He relies on pure energy in battle, shooting his powerful attack, Tamama Impact (earlier referred to as Tamama crazy breath), a yellow energy beam from his mouth. He is often seen training, usually beating up a piece of wood with a sloppy drawing of Mois.

Tamama has a weakness for snacks and sweets, courtesy of his ultra-rich roommate Momoka, who indulges him freely.

=== Kururu ===
Voiced by: Takehito Koyasu (2004–2026), Kōsuke Echigoya (2026–present) (Japanese); Chuck Huber (English, Funimation dub), Todd Haberkorn (English, Funimation, pilot dub)

Sergeant Major Kururu (クルル曹長, Kururu Sōchō), localized as Kululu in Funimation's English anime dub, is the resident genius in the Keroro Platoon serving as their Tactical Communications Chief. His body is yellow, with orange headgear that includes two headphone-like white pieces over his ears. His forehead and belly mark is a filled spiral. He wears glasses with spirals on them. Kururu was blue when he was little, but at the end of the short movie Secret of the Kero Ball, he became yellow due to being stuck in a colossal curry plate that Keroro made for him from the Kero Ball.

Although he is the highest-ranking officer in the platoon, he is not the leader due to his unpleasant and threatening demeanor, which has given him the nickname of "Yellow Devil". Kururu is enigmatic, deceitful, lazy, sadistic, and has a habit of snickering (with a characteristic "Ku Ku Ku" sound) at the beginning and ending of sentences. Like Keroro, Kururu appears to have little to no interest in conquering the planet, though his disinterest in accomplishing this mission is more out of sheer laziness. Unlike the rest of the platoon who specialize in combat, Kururu's expertise lies in his high-level technological prowess, including hacking and inventing; he has designed and created most of the gadgets and weapons used by the platoon. Many of his inventions that he builds at Keroro's request often end up backfiring. It is heavily implied that Kururu intentionally does this due to his low respect for Keroro's plans and the pleasure it gives him to watch Keroro fail.

He is generally disliked, most of the characters seeing him as a disagreeable prankster. Kururu cares very little of what people think of him and often ignores others attempts to set him straight, being able to ignore just about anyone who tries to talk any sense into him except for Mois, who once inadvertently got him to stop a sadistic string of pranks by simply looking at him with a sad face. Despite his unfriendly personality, Kururu surprisingly becomes cooperative whenever Keroro develops an invasion plan whether or not it involves a personal agenda, often building whatever Keroro requests with little to no reservations despite intentionally sabotaging most of these plans himself.

In the series, action figures tend to sell very poorly on Keron, but Kururu seems to take pride in his bad attitude. Whenever something bad happens to another character or is blamed for doing something, he laughs in a medium- to a high-pitched voice saying "Kekekekekekekeke." Despite his attitude, he gets along quite well with Mutsumi, his human friend, and Aki Hinata, with whom he has a stalkerish crush. Kururu and Giroro greatly loathe each other due to their vast differences (brain vs. brawn). As a result, Kururu usually uses Giroro as a guinea pig for any invention that he creates.

His name comes from the Japanese word for the phrase "round and round" ("kuru kuru"), referring to the spirals seen on his glasses.

=== Dororo ===
Voiced by: Takeshi Kusao (2004–2026), Satoshi Inomata (2026–present) (Japanese); J. Michael Tatum (English, Funimation dub), David Lee McKinney (English, Animax Asia dub)

Lance Corporal Dororo (ドロロ兵長, Dororo Heichō) is the last of the platoon to appear. His body is medium blue (although painted completely black in the manga) with light gray ninja-like headgear and mouthpiece. His forehead and belly mark are four-pointed shuriken, and he always carries a sheathed knife on the back. His pink Afro is the one seen more rarely.

Then known as Lance Corporal Zeroro (ゼロロ兵長, Zeroro Heichō), he graduated from the Keron Military Academy under the rank of Lance Corporal. After serving alongside Zoruru in an elite assassin squad, under the command of Captain Jirara, he was assigned as the assassin of the Keroro Platoon alongside Keroro, Giroro, Tamama, and Kururu. They were given the mission to conquer Pekopon. After a crash landing on Pekopon, Zeroro was rescued by ninja-in-training Koyuki Azumaya (in the anime, he was rescued by Koyuki and her dog Zeroyasha). Wishing to follow the way of the ninja, Zeroro changed his name to Dororo.

His reunion with the rest of the platoon does not start well since he resigns because he no longer shares their invasion objectives and wishes to embrace his new life as a ninja on earth. He tells Koyuki that life with her and the peacefulness of earth brought him a new life perspective. However, after he and Koyuki are captured by Viper and the platoon comes to rescue them, they mend their friendship after Keroro tells him that he broke his music box and that he wishes their friendship can be mended. He eventually rejoins the platoon after making them steam a bit. In the manga, he and Koyuki move to a house beside the Hinatas, but they live in a small traditional house in the anime mountain, bordering the Nishizawa state.

As Dororo, he is a kind and meek soul, but his skills in stealth and speed-based attacks are unrivaled. He spends most of his time training, reading, or spying on the actions of Keroro Platoon and others. The rest of the Keroro Platoon often forgets Dororo. Also, Dororo will not participate in potentially harmful plans to people's feelings or well-being, the environment, etc. He was a childhood friend of Keroro and Giroro and Pururu as a child and still looks up to his leader and the corporal, but they both seem to forget his name.

Dororo has a very close friendship with Koyuki and stays with her in a traditional Japanese home. Koyuki is often the only person who encourages and supports Dororo while Dororo encourages her to fit in with modern Japanese society. Dororo's decision to rejoin the platoon primarily came from Koyuki's insistence that he reconnects with his fellow platoon members even though they had forgotten him.

=== Shin Keroro ===
Voiced by: Aoi Yuki (Japanese)

Shin Keroro is the new, sixth member of the platoon, and the youngest, who features in the manga. He is a Kiruru DNA clone of Keroro. He has a similar personality as Keroro, such as playing video games and building Gunpla models with him. Unlike other platoons, being a mobile weapon, which his Keron Star holds his weapon when he turns and presses it. He has three forms called T-style, G-style, and D-style. He's skilled at using them as he almost defeated the whole platoon. In his T-style, his skin is now dark blue like Tamama's, and his arms are larger with a Wakaba symbol on his fists, which he battles by using his tough punches. His skin is red, and his cap is dark red; it features a black scar below his left eye, a similar feature to Giroro's. When in his G-style, he battles using his futuristic firearms, but it is not used in the manga. In his D-style, his skin is blue, and his cap is white like Dororo's. His face and belly are black, and he battles using his two claws, sometimes a knife, which he also used when he defeated Koyuki. His bracelet is a new model of the Kero Ball. His best friend is Tomosu.

=== Keroro Platoon Robot Double ===
The Keroro double platoon was created by the Keroro platoon to stand in for them while they took the day off. The double platoon is easily identifiable from the real one due to their differently shaped eyes and their somewhat curled feet (and, in Kururu's double case, a conic head). Still, Fuyuki and Natsumi were unable to notice the difference. However, they were left in invasion mode and tried to invade Earth for real before the real platoon stopped them.

The platoon took the robots off again to do their homework, apparently limited by Kururu. But the platoon changed the mode to "do whatever you want" and took their obsessions to the extreme. They escaped to space and committed several felonies. Garuru's platoon was charged with stopped them but mistook them for the real Keroro platoon. The Garuru platoon defeated them, but they did not realize they were robots.

=== Garuru Platoon ===
==== Garuru ====
Voiced by: Akio Otsuka (Japanese)

First Lieutenant Garuru (ガルル中尉, Garuru Chui) is a Keronian S-rank sniper, a first lieutenant of the Keron Army, and the leader of the Garuru Platoon. The Keron Army sent the Garuru Platoon to replace the Keroro Platoon to conquer Pekopon, in episodes 101–103. Garuru defeated his younger brother Giroro in a one-on-one gun match but was later defeated in a rematch. Thanks to the Keroro Platoon's friendship and united power, the Garuru Platoon was defeated.

Garuru is known for being powerful, no-nonsense in battle, and intimidating.

==== Taruru ====
Voiced by: Akeno Watanabe (Japanese); Chris Cason (English, Funimation dub)

Formerly Tamama's apprentice and still calls him "master," or "senpai", Private First Class Taruru (タルル上等兵, Taruru Jōtōhei) was more clumsy than Tamama in the past. Taruru first appeared to see if all the Keroro Platoon rumors were true, revealing what Tamama told him about the platoon. In the anime, he also appeared a couple of times with his childhood friend Karara, forming a duo of mischievous tadpoles. Despite Taruru's clumsiness in the past, he became skilled since training with the Garuru Platoon and has exceeded Tamama in both growth and rank, defeating him in a face-off, but was defeated by a persevering Tamama. Taruru is light blue with gray headgear and wears the Koreisha mark on belly and forehead.

==== Tororo ====
Voiced by: Kappei Yamaguchi (Japanese)

Recruit Tororo (トロロ新兵, Tororo Shinpei) is the newest member of the Garuru Platoon who, like Kururu, is the team's intelligence officer and hacker. He captured the allies of the Keroro Platoon until Dororo's deathblow damaged the computers.

According to Kururu, Tororo was his rival back in Planet Keron because of his desire to prove to others of his higher intelligence and to put Kururu down. Because of Tororo losing to Kururu several times, the young, twisted, and mad genius attempted attacks upon him, though he could never gain his desired victory.

He later destroyed the entire Keroro Platoon Double. He then visited the real platoon in un-wanted honor. He usually laughs like Kururu.

==== Zoruru ====
Voiced by: Kazuki Yao (Japanese)

Lance Corporal Zoruru (ゾルル兵長, Zoruru Heichō) was once a former partner of Dororo's. He captured the allies of the Keroro Platoon until embarrassed to be forgotten by Dororo. He was defeated by Dororo Double and visited the Keroro Platoon in honor. He has worked with Keroro, Giroro, and Dororo/Zeroro before the Earth invasion. He was the only one who was not defeated while on Earth.

==== Pururu ====
Voiced by: Satsuki Yukino (Japanese)

Chief Medic Pururu (プルル看護長, Pururu Kangochō) appears in the series as the most recent and only female member of the Garuru Platoon, a chief medic and expert nurse, and a childhood friend to Keroro, Giroro, and Dororo. She has an energetic, down-to-earth, somewhat strict, and stubborn personality but is also nonviolent and mature, unlike most of the series's major characters. She graduated from the Keron Military Academy simultaneously with her childhood friends Keroro, Giroro, and Dororo. Pururu is sometimes referred to as Obaa-chan (old lady), making her go into small questioning fits of self-worth — despite her still having a tail.

In the anime series, she later comes to stay on Earth to take care of Keroro's Platoon's health.

=== Shurara Corps ===
The Shurara Corps (シュララ軍団, Shurara Gundan) is a platoon of Keronians. Their mission is to study the Keroro Platoon to judge when it is right to destroy them and steal the Keron star from Keroro. The Shurara Corps consists of the leader, Shurara, and nine subordinate members: Putata, Mekeke, Giruru, Dokuku, Kagege, Nuii, Gyororo, Robobo, and Yukiki.

==== Shurara/Shirara ====
Shurara voiced by: Norio Wakomoto (Japanese)

Shirara voiced by: Houko Kuwashima (Japanese)

The leader of the Shurara Corps. His real name is Shirara (シララ), and he was one of Keroro's classmates. Unlike most Keronians, he has two body colors, purple and green. His symbol is a blue circle with squares on the sides and three small black rectangles pointing upwards.

When he was young, he was a friend of Pururu, who was kind to him when he was hurt and put a star-shaped plaster on him. Due to this, he has a crush on Pururu. However, Keroro ripped the plaster off him. Pururu punished him, but Shirara was upset and vowed revenge. When he found a special gold and silver helmet called the Keromet, he put it on and was powered up. He changed his name to Shurara, formed the Shurara Corps, and decided to get Keroro's Keron Star. The helmet, though, was a planet eater, eventually expanding to huge sizes and absorbing Sharara, which caused Shurara to destroy it. After this, he became Shirara again and returned to Keron with Pururu.

==== Putata ====
Voiced by: Kentaro Tone (Japanese)

Putata (プタタ) is a skilled artist working for the Shurara Corps, using the title of Master Painter Putata (プタタ画伯, Putata Gahaku). Putata is a naturally yellow Keronian, though he has painted spots on his body, like around his left eye, where he is orange. Putata's symbol on his stomach and forehead is in the shape of a light blue shuriken. His paintbrush and cap-like helmet with blue-tipped bolts on top are made out of mostly silver-colored metal. Putata's paintbrush is also a weapon that enables him to bring his paintings to life, though it has a limited amount of usable ink. It can transform into a Nyororo paintbrush that Putata uses to suck Keronians up and use the liquid as ingredients for ink. Keroro destroyed the paintbrush by holding some hot curry as he was sucked.

In his introduction, Putata was seen vandalizing the residence and property of the Hinata family. The Keroro Platoon, by that time, did not know that he was a part of the Shurara Corps.

Putata is the most energetic, lively, and vivid of the Shurara Corps. He is rarely moved to tears. Putata is very agile, which allows him to paint quickly.

==== Mekeke ====
Voiced by: Chō (Japanese)

Mekeke (メケケ) is Putata's partner. He is introduced as the Enigmatic Puppet – using Keronian – and is also referred to as Super Marionette Mekeke. He can take control of whomever he attaches his strings to. He is a teal Keronian with gold eyes. When exposed to paint, Mekeke appears to wear a crossed eyepatch, a large, sleeveless shirt, and floppy ears. His symbol is a blue circle with a medical cross. His puppet has large, blond sideburns, a crossed eyepatch, eye cross, four arms equipped with blades, and a puppeteer cross. Mekeke has amazing stealth and ability, though his puppet strings are easily broken. His puppet uses its puppeteer cross to levitate. This is a parody of Kankuro and Sasori's Crow from Naruto. When fully exposed to non-solid substances, his invisibility is cancelled out.

==== Giruru ====
Voiced by: Kunihiko Yasui (Japanese)

Giruru (ギルル) is a mutant Keronian of pure blue slime. Being made of liquid, he can manipulate the shape of his body. He has the ability to turn others into puddles. He has large yellow eyes that lack pupils. His symbol is a small yellow drop. His weakness is a powder, especially oil hardener since he solidifies on contact. In the anime, Giruru's name was changed from Geruru in the Keroro Land magazine.

==== Dokuku ====
Voiced by: Takeshi Kusao (Japanese)

Dokuku (ドクク) is Giruru's younger brother, who was turned into white gas form in an experiment. He lacks legs and has a scarlet tipped ghost-like tail. His left eye is scarred, and his right is blue and lacks pupils. He has fire red sideburns. His symbol is a large white drop with a demonic outlook. His left hand is a scythe blade, and has two levitating red flames that follow him. Being gas, Dokuku can levitate and phase through cracks and holes. He can use his scythe hand as a weapon as well as the fireball. He can possess people by going up against their bottoms. His primary objective was seemingly to free Giruru from the Keroro Platoon. He tells Giruru that he is quitting the Shurara Corps because he is not being paid enough.

==== Kagege ====
Voiced by: Toshio Furukawa (Japanese)

The assassin of the Shurara Corps. Kagege (カゲゲ) is a white Keronian with blue and purple flames, an old tadpole who wears a dark blue scarf. His left and only eye has a blue cross and glows, leading to his eventual defeat in the Keroro Platoon's darkness. His shadow is shaped like large blue flames with his missing right blue eye with a white cross. His symbol is a blue downward point with two curved spikes on the left side.

==== Nuii ====
Voiced by: Kurumi Mamiya (Japanese)

Originally an abandoned stitched up orange Keronian doll resembling a tadpole, Nuii (ヌイイ) was brought to life by Shurara and was made a member of the Shurara Corps with the title of Little Tailor Nuii (お針子のヌイイ, Ohariko no Nuii). Her pupils are large buttons, and she has rosy cheeks. Her symbol is a yellow button with a cross at the center that lies on her forehead, stomach, shoulders, and hat flaps. She can turn an enemy into a doll with needles shot out of her arm.

She comes to Earth and assumes the identity of Ku-chan, Natsumi's old abandoned teddy bear. After she is discovered, she is taken into the Hinata Household, where she loves and treats Nuii like a regular doll. Under the instruction of her superior, Gyororo, Nuii starts turning the Keroro Platoon and Fuyuki into dolls. When Gyororo urges Nuii to turn Natsumi into a doll, the memories of the time she and Natsumi had spent together make her hesitate and turn on Gyororo. Nuii can hold Gyororo still long enough for Keroro to capture him in a bubble. Afterward, Nuii turns everyone back to normal and flies back to Planet Keron, searching for her former owner.

==== Gyororo ====
Screenshot of Gyororo from episode 188

Voiced by: Hiromi Hirata (Japanese)

Gyororo (ギョロロ) spies on the Keroro Platoon and reports their findings to Shurara. Gyororo ordered Nuii, once their comrade, to turn the Keroro Platoon and Fuyuki into dolls. However, when ordered to attack Natsumi, Nuii disobeyed and restrained Gyororo long enough for Keroro to trap them inside a bubble. They became a prisoner of the Keroro Platoon.

They are a purple-blue and green tadpole Keronian with multiple eyes covering their body, hat, and the tip of their prehensile tail. They have a crazed smile full of sharp teeth, and their irises are red. They can merge and blend in with their surroundings, though one of their eyes is always visible. They can shoot lasers from their eyes. Gyororo has never canonically been referred to by any male or female pronouns. Thus they have no gender until their creator confirms it.

==== Robobo ====
Voiced by: Keiichi Sonobe (Japanese)

Robobo (ロボボ) is programmed to steal the Keron star from Keroro. In episode 185, Robobo turned everyone into an electrical appliance to make them helpless. Dororo defeated him, but Robobo returned, so the platoon had to use the Grand Keron to defeat him.

Robobo has square-shaped glass eyes. His symbol is a white circle with a smaller black circle inside it. He wears a skull cap with headphones. His hands and feet are magnets. His larger form has two drills instead of magnets for hands. He has the power to fuse an entire city population with a nearby mechanical object. He can fly using built-in jets.

==== Yukiki ====
Voiced by: Eiji Maruyama (Japanese)

Yukiki (ユキキ) is an adult snowman Keronian, introduced as Yukiki of the Mount Daisetsu Wind. He has a carrot for a nose and wears red mittens and a red bucket for a hat with a blue scarf under it to make ear flaps. The symbol on his light blue stomach is a silhouette of a two-tiered snowman with eyes. He can disguise himself as a snowman by pulling in his arms and legs. He can form a swirling Arctic wind, creating a block of ice from which he materializes himself. He can freeze items, making them useless.

=== Keroro Land characters ===
==== Keroro Land Allies ====
In the spin-off series in Keroro Land, Keroro created an alliance to fight against the Black Stars. This alliance included: Toriri (bird-like), Saruru (monkey-like), Inunu (dog-like), Aruru (a nurse), Mukaka, Tsunene (fox-like), Tanunu (tanuki-like), Honolulu (a golem), and Garnier (a sand granite Keronian).

==== Black Stars ====
A fictional team Keroro Land consists of four deadly daredevil Keronians bent on conquering Keron: Mahaha, who specializes in cycling, Merara who specializes in hoverboarding, Megaga, and Melaka.

==== Firuru ====
Firuru (フィルル) appears in the Sgt. Frog spin-off magazine Keroro Land. Figure (sometimes written as Filulu or Fielulu) is a sports doctor and the leader of Team Sporty in the Keroro Land magazine. This team, consisting of Piroro, Metoto, Jesus, Pokaka, and Oyoyo, was assembled to fight against the Black Stars, a group of four evil Keronians. Other teams were led by Keroro, Giroro, Zeroro (Dororo, while back on Keron), and Zorro.

=== Keroro Platoon's Family ===
==== Keroro's father ("the Demon Sergeant") ====
Voiced by: Kenichi Ogata (Japanese); Greg Dulcie (English, Funimation dub)

The father of Keroro and a legendary war hero in the Keronian military. He has an infamous reputation for violently invading and destroying planets. Once a high ranking Admiral, Keroro's father was demoted to the rank of Demon Sergeant after taking the fall for various war crimes on behalf of the Keronian Army even he was in fact guilty of all charges.

His fearsome reputation, serious demeanor, and stern attitude often incite great fear into those around him. When Keroro's father informs him that he is coming for a visit, Keroro and the platoon work hard to cover up their lack of progress in invading Earth out of fear that the Demon Sergeant will indeed destroy the Earth should he find out. Even Natsumi, who shows little to no fear of other Keronians, is deeply afraid of Keroro's father and, at times, reluctantly agrees to Keroro's plans to prevent his father from destroying Earth at one point, even agreeing to pretend to be Keroro's fiancé.

He is both admired and feared by his beloved son and was hard on him growing up. Part of why Keroro joined the military was to make his father proud of him. Despite his accomplishments, Keroro's father is still hard on him and constantly pushes him to become a man.

During the Demon Sergeant's first visit to Earth, he arrived with news that he has arranged a marriage between Keroro and another Keronian in what seemed to be an attempt to get Keroro to settle down and become a man. However, Keroro was against this arrangement as married Keronian's were forbidden from playing with toys, meaning he would have to give up his Gundam models. This, however, turned out to be a ruse by the Demon Sergeant to get to spend time with his son, showing that he does care for him as a son.

He frequently appears on vacation. He saved the Keroro Platoon by giving Viper a Parents Day message from his parents, revealing he was as weak and idiotic as his son. He revealed that Giroro's father, the Demon Sergeant's friend, was visiting and left with a photo of himself and Giroro's father. He has a Hitler Mustache and a Pickelhaube.

==== Dororo's Mother ====
Voiced by: Kumiko Watanabe (Japanese); Stephanie Young (English, Funimation dub)

A blue Keronian like her son. She may look weak as she is wearing a mask, but she is actually a skilled fighter that can knock down machines with pans.

=== Others ===
==== Karara ====
Voiced by: Junko Noda (Japanese); Alison Viktorin (English, Funimation dub)

Karara (カララ) is the daughter of the rich Dobaba family. She is often put in danger until rescued by members of the Keroro Platoon. She appeared with her childhood friend, Taurus, until Taruru joined the Garuru Platoon and was replaced by Karara's best friend, Chiroro. She is of light green color with purple headgear, she has blue-green eyes and still has her tadpole tail.

Karara was scheduled by her father to be married against her will, so she left Keron and came to Earth. She was temporarily enrolled as the Private Third Class of the Keroro Platoon but causes trouble and is rescued by Tamama from her father who attempted to kill her as punishment for disobeying him. She had gained feelings of love towards Kururu, Dororo and Giroro, and even attempted to marry Tamama. She was kidnapped but was rescued by Dororo, and she was gifted with a sword that, when freed from its chain, gives her ninja's clothing along with a white scarf and a silver mask over her eyes. She assists the Keroro Platoon in rescuing Chiroro from Viper until Karara gets taken hostage by Keroro in a Viper Pekopon Suit. While a reformed Viper grabbed Keroro, Dororo destroyed the Pekopon Suit with his attack "Blade of the Phoenix." Karara landed in the arms of Giroro and fell in love with him while Keroro was arrested. While entertaining the angry 753, Keroro gave Karara and Chiroro, and then they had successfully turned 753 back to normal, and thus, she fell in love with Keroro. Her Animal form is Lion.

==== Chiroro ====
Voiced by: Natsuko Kuwatani (Japanese)

Chiroro (チロロ) is the best friend, twin sister to Karara, and daughter to Dibaba. She first appears as a fellow ninja with Karara to impress Dororo. Her body is light yellow with white headgear. She still has her tadpole tail and has a no entry sign on her belly and forehead.

Chiroro and her sister, Karara, visited Dororo at his dojo in episode 121. She followed and irritated Viper, who she thought was a transformed Dororo, but she brought back his memories of his past. When Cool Big Brother Viper takes Karara hostage, Chiroro tells Viper how much she cares for Karara and does not want her to get hurt. Her words reform Viper, and Viper and Dororo work together to destroy Keroro disguised as Viper (for money) and rescue Karara while Viper leaves, promising to see them again. Her Animal form is Penguin.

==== Dobaba ====
Voiced by: Hidekatsu Shibata (Japanese)

Dobaba (ドババ) is the owner of the influential Dobaba Industries (similar to Nishizawa Corporation in Pekopon) and father of Karara and Chiroro. He demanded marriage for Karara, who then left for Earth. He hunted her down and prepared to capture her until she escaped with Tamama, while Dobaba never appeared again.

==== Joriri ====
Voiced by: Jun'ichi Sugawara (Japanese)

Joriri (ジョリリ) is a childhood friend of Keroro, even though Joriri is clearly much, much older. Joriri is a faded green-grey Keronian with stubble and thinning hair and prone to propping his foot up on something as he dispenses advice and life lessons from his years of experience. His symbol is a fat stylized capital, J. After lending a subtle guiding hand to Chibi Kero and the company, he reappears on Earth in the present time (looking the same). He does pretty much the same thing with the bonus of freeloading some of the Hinata house's facilities.

==== Mushishi ====
Voiced by: Shozo Iizuka (Japanese)

Mushishi (ムシシ) is a blue-green elder Keronian who was once a legendary assassin known as "Insect User Mushishi." When he first appears, he pretends to help Keroro with a plan involving insects. Still, when Dororo arrives at the end of the episode, he reveals that Mushishi is retired and devoted to his hobby to collect insects from around the galaxy, making the platoon realize that the old assassin has had them. He carries a bug-catching net and a pouch as well as a green bucket on top of his head that he keeps bugs in.

==== Kiruru. ====
Kiruru. (キルル。; pronounced Kiruru Dot) was born from Mirara being sealed away with the real Kiruru, making him the Kiruru sealed away in the Invasion Timer. He is a tadpole version of his counterpart/father, Kiruru but with a dot over the X mark. He is an incomplete version of Kirara. Instead of absorbing the power of negative thoughts, this Kiruru absorbed the power of hesitation. He was released from the Invasion Timer and befriended the Keroro Platoon. But later, a Keron vessel released swarms of black Kirurus (AKA Kiruru X-52). After Black Kirurus took over, the black Kirurus gave X marks to Natsumi, Tamama, and Dororo that turned them evil, while Kirara. Gave triangles to the others. He then takes control of the ship base that controlled the black Kirurus by using the power of hesitation massively produced by Keroro and caused them to disappear. Then he turned everyone else back to normal. Kirara left with the memory of his friends.

==== Urere ====
Voiced by: Toshihiko Seki (Japanese)

Urere (ウレレ) is a highly ranked Keronian soldier who once assisted the Keroro Platoon in conquering Earth. It is purple. His helmet has headphones with a microphone attached. His symbol is an exclamation point, but the one on his chest is rendered upside-down, resembling a tie. He rarely blinks.

==== Robobo Fukusocho ====
Robobo Fukusocho is a robot substitute for Kururu. He was made from silver metal. He has rectangle-shaped magnet feet and has crescent magnets for hands. His symbol is a black dot with golden tracings.

==== Rirara ====
Rirara (リララ) is a Keronian kunoichi. She is yellow. She wields a shuriken with a string through it and a summoning scroll. Her helmet has two ribbons. Her symbol is a crescent moon.

==== Gitata ====
Gitata (ギタタ) is a Keronian guitarist. It is yellow. He plays an electric guitar. He has a mustache in the shape of lightning bolts. His symbol is a red guitar pick.

==== Gururu ====
Gururu (グルル) is a green cowboy Keronian. He has a rope tied from his shoulder to his waist. He wears boots and a hat. His symbol is a Texan star.

==== Gororo ====
Gororo (ゴロロ) is a yellow criminalized Keronian. He has yellow and black sideburns. He has a lightning bolt across his chest and eyes. He commonly holds sticks of dynamite and panels of electricity. His symbol is a lightning bolt.

==== Eruru ====
Eruru (エルル) is an orange intelligent female Keronian. She wears glasses and a barrette and commonly carries a pen and notebook. Her symbol is an upward rectangle with a triangle on top.

==== Captain Jirara ====
Captain Jirara (ジララ) was the leader of the assassin squad that Dororo (then Zeroro) and Zoruru used to be in. His mastery of Keronian Assassin Magic is unparalleled. He went rogue and fled to Earth, seeking out Dororo for one final duel. He is outfitted in a top-to-toe black suit, with armored blade-arms like Zoruru, an assassin mouthpiece (minus the breathing valve in Dororo's old mouthpiece), and a mask with three glowing red eyes and a shuriken over his left eye. His symbol is a shuriken with diamond blades. Jirara's name is from Jiraiya.

==== Sababa ====
Sababa (サババ) settled on Earth during the golden age of Egypt, opening the possibility that the Great Pyramids were created through Keronian technology. Having evolved into a sand-based form after hundreds of years, Sababa has lost the ability to communicate in any coherent language, uttering 'sabarabara' at random, which leads Keroro to dub him Sababa. He wears an old and worn headgear, kohl around his eyes, and a pharaoh hook in place of his right hand. His symbol resembles two triangles end-to-end, the lower one twice as large as the upper, which is decorated with two eyes (a possible reference to the familiar eye-on-a-pyramid symbol on the US dollar bill.) The name Sababa comes from sabaku, meaning desert.

==== Meruru ====
Meruru (メルル) is a member of Keron's official postal service, who comes to Earth to deliver a message for Keroro, which he tries to avoid receiving, thinking that it is a message from headquarters (but turns out to be a letter from Shipepe, Keroro, Giroro and Dororo's long time friend). Meruru is dedicated to her job to the point that she maneuvers her way around all of the platoon's attempts to detain her, including cloaking devices, guns loaded with capsules of sticky gunk, evasive driving, and Tamama's farting (which Meruru isn't slightly bothered by and possibly likes). Meruru's symbol is an envelope.

==== Kikaka ====
Kikaka (キカカ) is an artificially made Keronian which befriended Zeroro/Dororo and soon after Keroro, Giroro & Pururu during their childhood and having a few adventures with them, such as scaring away some bullies. The bullies then mistake Kikaka for the escaped biotech weapon that the army's been searching for and plan to turn him in until the real weapon (a more modern Kiruru) shows itself and Kikaka wards it off. Unfortunately, Kikaka then transforms into its true form, a simple doll (it is hinted that Kikaka was one of the first few tests of a much younger Kururu's Nanola)

==== Officer Bariri ====
Voiced by: Ken Narita (Japanese)

Bariri (バリリ) has a crush on Pururu. He tends to describe his emotions through fruit.

==== Black Star ====
Black Star is the main villain of the manga volume 23. His history is unknown, though it is suspected that he is the first attempt to make that Shin Keroro failed. Black Star resembles Shin Keroro except he's mostly black, two ear-like appendages on his head instead of wearing a cap, wearing blue rings all over his body (his appendages, wrists, and neck as his collar). His eyes are colored blood red with black-lined rings around his pupil, his symbol is a black star (hence his name), and it is upside down, as opposed to Shin Keroro's Keron Star.

==== Nobibi ====
Voiced by: Hidekatsu Shibata (Japanese)

Nobibi (ノビビ) is Kiko Katoyama's Keronian friend. He is spoiled and quick-tempered towards the Keroro Platoon, but playful and kind towards Kiko. Nobili has a younger sister, Hanna.

==== Hanana ====
Hanana (ハナナ) is Nobibi's younger sister. She is a kind-hearted flower, Keronian. She is a pink Keronian. She has a point above her mouth. She wears a large blue and orange flower on her helmet. Her tadpole tail is a leaf. Her symbol is a flower bud. She has a one-sided love for Guru. Her name comes from the Japanese word Hana, which means Flower.

== Earthlings/Pekoponians ==
Along with the broad cast of alien characters, the series also devotes much attention to the humans that the aliens encounter. The five main members of the Keroro Platoon each have a human partner whom they share an especially strong personal bond with, which can vary from friendship to familial or romantic feelings. These partners are all teenagers (who in the anime attend Kissho Gakuen, a middle school in Tokyo) and have their own web of correlations.

=== Hinata Family ===
==== Fuyuki Hinata ====
Voiced by: Tomoko Kawakami (2004–2008), Houko Kuwashima (2008–2026), Yuki Sakakihara (2026–present) (Japanese); Leah Clark (English, Funimation dub), Candice Moore (English, Animax Asia dub)

Fuyuki Hinata (日向 冬樹, Hinata Fuyuki) 12-year-old Fuyuki is intelligent on the surface, but is an oddity even within that scope, as his main interest is in the 'occult' – a term that comprises everything from the best-known international mysteries (Stonehenge, the Bermuda Triangle, ghosts, UFOs, etc.) to the obscure, like the Seven School Mysteries (a grab-all term for haunted schoolhouses). A dedicated explorer and adventurer, Fuyuki sadly lacks the athletic skills required for most of the hardships he endures in his daily life. Swimming, in particular is a huge handicap for him, especially in contrast with his athletic older sister Natsumi. In the rare opportunities Fuyuki gets mad, it is enough to scare Keroro and even Natsumi into submission. Despite his fascination with the paranormal, he does not have any spiritual sensibility, in contrast with his sister. He is scared of bugs. However, he is a master teller of horror stories. His best friend is Sgt. Keroro and was the one who discovered his existence while his sister was waking him up. Though his sister Natsumi was the one who pointed to his hiding spot he is the one who saw the paper peeling first and while staring he captured Natsumi's attention and she also saw Keroro.

Fuyuki's Keronian partner is Keroro, even though Keroro is supposed to be his enemy. The two do share a natural curiosity (Fuyuki is drawn towards the mysteries of the world, while Keroro is mystified by things most humans consider commonplace), as well as the strongest friendship of the five Keronian/human child pairs. Unlike Natsumi (who treats Keroro as a house slave), Fuyuki is generally kind and supportive of Keroro and treats him as an equal. He affectionately calls him 'gunso' or 'gunso-san', meaning 'sergeant'. His appeals to their shared friendship are enough to stop Keroro's plans more than once. Fuyuki is delighted by all the wonders he gets to see with the Keronians and jumps feet first in many of their plans. Though they maintain a strong bond with each other, there have been multiple instances where Keroro has taken advantage of Fuyuki for his own gain.

He created an Occult Club in his high school, of which only he, Momoka, and Chiruyo are the only members. He seems unaware of either Momoka or Chiruyo's crushes on him. The manga details that, at least in its middle school incarnation, Fuyuki's Occult Club was slightly more popular, having at least three unnamed members.

==== Natsumi Hinata ====
Voiced by: Chiwa Saitō (2004–2026), Minori Fujidera (2026–present) (Japanese); Cherami Leigh (English, Funimation dub)

Natsumi Hinata (日向 夏美, Hinata Natsumi) 13-year-old Natsumi is the powerful older sister of Fuyuki and the one in charge of the Hinata house when their mother is not home. A minor celebrity in her own school, she often gets pleas of help from classmates like Yayoi and Satsuki (below), due to her unparalleled physical skills. Feisty and genial, Natsumi is equally capable as a friend, a fighter, and a loving family member.

She is very strict on Keroro and always doubts of his intentions, physically abusing him on several occasions (as well as treating him as a house slave), and never calls him by name, only snapping "Boke gaeru" ("stupid frog") at him whenever she has to. Inversely, Natsumi's infatuation with Saburo proves to be one of her few weakness on several occasions and mostly end up with her humiliating herself in front of him. Despite her general dislike of Keroro, Natsumi comes to care for him over time and comes to see him as a member of the Hinata family.

Natsumi has a general dislike for Keronians (especially Keroro) due to their tendency to cause trouble and destruction wherever they go. Since Keroro tried to enslave them with the Keroball during their first meeting, Natsumi is almost always on high alert when it comes to Keroro and his men and is usually the first one to confront them whenever they try to take over the world. Given her high athletic ability and martial arts training, Natsumi shows little to no fear when facing the Keronians and is often the victor in their battles. The only Keronian Natsumi has shown genuine fear of is Keroro's father, the Demon Sergeant, due to his reputation of destroying planets when he is angry. Her fear of the Demon Sergeant has caused her to reluctantly go along with Keroro's plans to prevent his father from destroying the Earth.

Natsumi is often the unwilling victim in many of Keroro's schemes due to her constant abuse of him, though she typically gets back at him by beating him up. Ironically, she sometimes blackmails him into including her, Fuyuki, occasionally their mother and other friends in his plans, mostly when they involve travelling to exotic locations like the beach or outer space. Unlike her brother, Natsumi is highly sensitive spiritually, feeling an "oppression" when ghosts are near.

Natsumi's toughness and tomboy personality have caused most of the girls in her school to fall in love with her, in some cases stalking her and forcing her brother to deliver presents to her on Valentine's Day.

Natsumi's Keronian partner is Giroro, but theirs is the most unofficial as far as relationships go. While they relate to each other almost subliminally (from hot tempers and combative tendencies to a love for roasting sweet potatoes) and are close personally, Natsumi has no idea that Giroro has been infatuated with her since the day she first bested him in strategy and combat: an incident that involved her busting past his boobytraps armed with a leek and taking him out with a bookbag to the head. In fact it is Keroro that Natsumi is more strongly connected to – their petty rivalries sit high above a deep, underlying current of mutual respect and concern that runs both ways.

It is shown that she separates Giroro from the other frogs, as she calls the ARMPIT Platoon 'Giroro and the stupid frogs/the others'. In episode 269, she hugs and cries Giroro when he came back alive from Natsumi's large intestine, while she did not when in one of the earlier episodes, Keroro came back alive from banishing forever, instead she only shed some tears.

==== Aki Hinata ====
Voiced by: Akiko Hiramatsu (2004–2026), Chiwa Saitō (2026–present) (Japanese); Jamie Marchi (English, Funimation dub), Candice Moore (English, Animax Asia dub)

Aki Hinata (日向 秋, Hinata Aki) is the mother of Fuyuki and Natsumi Hinata and is the head of the family that Keroro lives with. Her exact age is unknown; however, she is believed to be around 35 years old. Beautiful, kind, and immensely strong, Aki first meets Keroro after he subdued her children in an attempt to take over their house. Although she swiftly stopped Keroro from taking over their home, Aki became fascinated by Keroro being an alien and allowed him to stay with them until he could reunite with his platoon.

Whether it is supporting a family of three on her own, making late night runs to the printing press on her motorcycle, or kicking aliens around every few weeks, it is common belief (at least to the Keronians) that Hinata Aki is the strongest woman on Earth. Despite her fear of animals, she feels as though the Keroro Platoon is her own family (due entirely to them being shiny and possibly slimy, as opposed to the furry nature of most animals). As a chief manga editor/designer, she finds the aliens' lifestyle very interesting and often has spells of obsession over them.

While Aki has no official Keronian partner (as none of the adults do), it is Kururu who has taken a special interest in her, to the extent of setting up a spy camera in her shower. Whether this is for the purposes of studying 'the most powerful human on Earth' or for the same reasons anyone would spy on her in the shower remains to be seen.

==== Akina Hinata ====
Voiced by: Hisako Kyoda, Akiko Hiramatsu (young) (Japanese); Linda Leonard (English, Funimation dub)

Akina Hinata (日向 秋奈, Hinata Akina) is the grandmother of Fuyuki and Natsumi. She, like Fuyuki, believes in paranormal activity in the form of forest spirits. She is aware of the existence of Keroro and the aliens.

==== Haru Hinata ====
Haru Hinata (日向 春, Hinata Haru) is Aki's husband and Fuyuki and Natsumi's father. He is never fully shown and is rarely mentioned in the anime. He is known to be constantly traveling the world, and it is unknown if he actually knows about the Keronians living in his house or about aliens at all. His own interest in mysteries around the world, like the Easter Island's Moais, seemed to inspire Fuyuki's occult obsession.

=== Nishizawa Family ===
==== Momoka Nishizawa ====
Voiced by: Haruna Ikezawa (2004–2026), Sumire Morohoshi (2026–present) (Japanese) (Japanese); Monica Rial (English, Funimation dub), Andrea Kwan (English, Animax Asia dub)

Momoka Nishizawa (西澤 桃華, Nishizawa Momoka) is a multi-billionaire 12-year-old and classmate of Fuyuki. She has a split personality, indicated in the anime by her Fawcett curls turning into spikes. While being a well-connected heiress who lives in an expansive mansion, Momoka views her extravagant lifestyle as completely commonplace and acts in a refined and timid manner for most of the time. Her other personality is much more aggressive and violent, emphasized by the aforementioned hairstyle and a rougher voice.

Despite being outgoing in everything else, Momoka is really shy when it comes to Fuyuki for whom she has strong romantic feelings towards him. Her more timid personality is unable to confess her feelings to him, leading her other personality to take over and concoct the most crazy (and expensive) plans to gain Fuyuki's affection, to be near him or to make him happy. As head of the Nishizawa Peach Group or NPG, there is very little that is beyond her capability, even if the final bill is truly astronomical. Though she has a private army of guards devoted to her safety and happiness and the highly advanced technology of NPG at her disposal, often her plans need the more advanced keronian technology or the collaboration of the platoon themselves, and she hires them for an enormous amount of money.

Momoka's Keronian partner is Tamama whom she allows to live in her mansion and enjoy the life of luxury. Though they started off on the wrong foot, they eventually became close friends with one another. When it comes to Fuyuki, Tamama will often assist Momoka in whatever plan she concocts in order to win his heart, no matter how crazy her plans can be and will even go against Keroro should his plan interfere with hers. It is mentioned in the anime that she found Tamama "on the street" and took him in, pampering him and leaving his platoonmates very jealous.

==== Paul Moriyama ====
Voiced by: Keiji Fujiwara (2004–2014), Yoshimitsu Shimoyama (2026–present) (Japanese); Kent Williams (English, Funimation dub)

Paul Moriyama (ポール森山, Pōru Moriyama) is the butler of Momoka. As Momoka's butler and full-time guardian, Paul does everything in his power to make her happy and protect her. According to flashbacks, a duel with Momoka's father Bayo Nishizawa resulted in Paul's current place as Momoka's caretaker. Tamama relates to him as a fellow martial artist, despite Paul being in a completely different league – not even the Tamama Impact (Tamama crazy breath) can take down Paul, a notorious street fighter in his prime. Flashbacks to his youth reveal the young Paul to be based on Ken Masters of Street Fighter fame. Paul is most famously known as "The Mustache".

==== Baio Nishizawa ====
Voiced by: Shuichi Ikeda (Japanese); Robert McCollum (English, Funimation dub)

Baio Nishizawa (西澤 梅夫, Nishizawa Baiō) is the father of Momoka and head of the world superpower-like Nishizawa corporation, of which Momoka's already-powerful Nishizawa Peach Group is a mere subsidiary. Baio trusts his daughter's happiness due to him living out of state, usually in a castle by a lake in Scotland. He tries to meet with his daughter, but he rarely accomplishes it. He is aware of the existence of the Keroro platoon.

Flashbacks to his youth reveal him to be based on Ryu of Street Fighter fame. His older self looked liked Tony Stark from Marvel Comics Iron Man.

==== Oka Nishizawa ====
Voiced by: Yoshiko Sakakibara (Japanese)

Oka Nishizawa (西澤 桜華, Nishizawa Ōka) is Momoka's mother and Baio's wife. She has amazing fighting skills. She encountered Baio as her finalist opponent during a martial arts tournament. After the battle, the two fell in love, married, and had Momoka. When Momoka matured, Ōka had left the mansion to Momoka. She returns during Mother's Day and her abilities were tested. In a later episode, Oka was capable of defeating Giroro and Dororo plus Kururu's battery of missiles unarmed, and only her husband proved to be a strong enough rival for her.

Much like her daughter, Ōka has both a violent and gentle personality. Her gentle personality occurs when she is treated with love and she loses her violent outlook.

Oka's design is modelled after Chun Li of Street fighter fame, but she always shows up first in a thick brown cloak over her entire body, tossing aside anything that gets in her way, reminiscent of Kenshiro's return to civilisation in Fist of the North Star.

=== Mutsumi Houjou ===
Voiced by: Akira Ishida (2004–2026), Hiiro Ishibashi (2026–present) (Japanese); Joel McDonald (English, Funimation dub), David Lee McKinney (English, Animax Asia dub)

Mutsumi Houjou (北城 睦実, Hōjō Mutsumi) or Saburo is 16 and is the eldest of the five main children. As a student, he skips class continuously and has a reputation for being somewhat of a trouble child. In truth, he is a mature, if mysterious, young man who has a hard time adjusting with his classmates because of his excellence in almost every subject (including academics and athletics). He hosts a popular late-night radio program which Natsumi compulsively listens to. Mutsumi is the least active main character of the series, but plays a significant role as Kururu's partner/friend, Natsumi's unrequited crush, Giroro's romantic rival, and probably the most intelligent human character.

Through a chance encounter with Kururu at school, Mutsumi not only met and rescued him from a battle gone awry but also acquired his trademark weapon: a virtual reality pen created by Kururu that can create anything on any solid surface, exclusively for himself. In the anime he uses the name Saburo (サブロー, Saburō) in public life, and uses "623" only in his radio show; his true identity is kept secret to the public. Unlike the other four Keronian/human child pairs, his relationship with Kururu is particularly distant, though they understand each other perfectly. Kururu may consider Mutsumi his only intellectual equal and vice versa, but he lives in his lab beneath the Hinata house instead of Mutsumi's home, thus shrouding Mutsumi's personal life in even more secrecy. However, Kururu seems aware of the fact that Mutsumi and Saburo are the same person. Mutsumi's name comes from a Japanese wordplay (Saburo means 326, and Mutsumi means 623).

Mutsumi had previously appeared as a radio talk show for teens host in the anime Seven of Seven.

=== Koyuki Azumaya ===
Voiced by: Ryo Hirohashi (2004–2026), Koko (2026–present) (Japanese); Luci Christian (English, Funimation dub), Andrea Kwan (English, Animax Asia dub)

Koyuki Azumaya (東谷 小雪, Azumaya Koyuki) is a kunoichi who entered Natsumi's school as a transfer student. Natsumi was her first deskmate at school. Drawn to Natsumi by what she only refers to as a "familiar scent", the girls soon become best friends. While she wears civilian clothing when in public, she always keeps on her ninja uniform in case of an emergency. Her skills as a civilian and a ninja are exceptionally outstanding: Her athletic ability rivals that of Natsumi, making her one of the most physically powerful character. Despite having amazing powers and a strict past, Koyuki is mostly carefree, optimistic, but in various occasions, eccentric. She believes in what is right and protects her friends with all her might. Unfortunately, her tendency to use her ninjitsu maneuvers to accomplish the most mundane of tasks often draws much unwanted attention. Having a huge crush on Natsumi, Koyuki enjoys her time with Natsumi, and has a very strong will to either build up good image in front of her or protect her as well.

Koyuki's Keronian partner is Dororo. She found and rescued a stranded Zeroro (now Dororo) from a bear trap, brought him back to her homelike ninja village, and taught him the ways of the ninja. Under the order of the government, her ninja clan was dissolved for not having further value of existence to the country, giving her a chance (was also her only choice) at a real life in the city. Sharing many interests and the same positive attitude, Dororo and Koyuki have the most stable and cohesive relationship of the five Keronian/human child pairs. He trusts Natsumi to teach Koyuki to live a modern life. Koyuki is often the only person who encourages and supports Dororo while Dororo encourages her to fit in with modern Japanese society. Dororo's decision to rejoin the platoon primarily came from Koyuki's insistence that he reconnects with his fellow platoon members even though they had forgotten him.

=== Chiruyo Tsukigami ===
Voiced by: Chinami Nishimura (Japanese); Alexis Tipton (English, Funimation dub), Lisa Gonzalez (English, Funimation dub pilot)

Chiruyo Tsukigami (月神 散世, Tsukigami Chiruyo) is an intelligent and meticulous classmate of Fuyuki. She is part of the Kishou Gakuen Shinbunbu or KGS, the school news club, and started out observing Keroro and Fuyuki's activities from a comfortable distance. Like Momoka, she has a crush on Fuyuki and is equally shy about her feelings toward him. She's obsessed with writing down in her notebooks all her observations about Fuyuki. She is 12 years old.

Chiruyo later befriends Pururu, who helped her get closer to Fuyuki. Though they do not live together, they share a good friendship.

=== Ms. Furbottom ===
Voiced by: Ema Kogure (Japanese, first voice), Asuka Tanii (Japanese, second voice); Colleen Clinkenbeard (English, Funimation dub, cat form), Brittney Karbowski (English, Funimation dub, human form)

Ms. Furbottom (子猫 Koneko) is Giroro's pet whitish pink cat that he first found during a rain storm. She accompanies Giroro in his tent from then on. She harbors romantic feelings for Giroro, though his obsessive crush on Natsumi get in the way of showing her feelings to him. Though she is friendly with most of the Hinata Family and the Platoon, she is openly hostile towards Natsumi as she sees her as her romantic rival. She sometimes unknowingly turns into human using one of Kururu's inventions. She quickly becomes Giroro's friend and became his pet after the Garuru Platoon's departure. Her human form bears a distinct resemblance to Cammy White of Street Fighter fame.

=== Melody Honey ===
Voiced by: Megumi Toyoguchi (Japanese); Tia Ballard (English, Funimation dub)

Melody Honey (メロディー・ハニー, Merodī Hanī) is a famous pop star from America who appears in the most unlikely places. She is first seen in chapter 54 of the manga and episode 13 of the anime, where she is seen taking a shower, while singing, unknowingly being watched by a Moku Alien. She is then "saved" by a mysterious figure, despite not caring or even noticing the Moku Alien's appearance. She likes all kinds of jokes, even the boring ones. She previously appeared in Seven of Seven and Arcade Gamer Fubuki, by Mine Yoshizaki.

=== Ghost ===
Voiced by: Chie Matsura (Japanese); Trina Nishimura (English, Funimation dub)

The Ghost (お観世, Omiyo) of the Hinata household, also known as Spirit-chan (幽霊ちゃん, Yūrei-chan), is a ghost living in Keroro's room. Aki bought the house for a low price because of that. She was imprisoned because she hid a Keronian (thought to have been a Kappa) with similar characteristic as Keroro. She was later rescued by that Keronian and died when she was 90 years old. Much like Dororo, Omiyo does not like to be forgotten by those around her (she even goes into Dororo's 'trauma switch' pose in episode 6), and her attempts at grabbing attention finally lead up to an aggressive manifestation in episode 46, where her true story is revealed. In volume 14 (and anime episode 178) she introduced herself as "Omiyo" to Momoka after she turned herself into a ghost to get closer to Fuyuki.

=== Satsuki Shiwasu and Yayoi Shimotsuki ===
Satsuki Shiwasu voiced by: Chie Matsura (Japanese); Kate Oxley (English, Funimation dub)
Yayoi Shimotsuki voiced by: Ema Kogure (Japanese, first voice), Asuka Tanii (Japanese, second voice); Kristi Kang (English, Funimation dub)

Satsuki Shiwasu (師走 五月) and Yayoi Shimotsuki (霜月 弥生) are two of Natsumi's classmates, her best friends long before Koyuki's debut; this relationship has led them to come very close indeed to discovering the Keroro platoon's existence on several occasions. Satsuki leads the school drama club with the passion of a thespian; and Yayoi, the more physically adept of the two, is in the swim team. They seek Natsumi's assistance in assorted school assignments, from stage presentations to sporting events, on a regular basis. In one episode Satsuki and Yayoi get to meet Keroro. Yayoi gets a little crush on Giroro for one episode. And there are some signs in episodes 2, 8, and 25 that Satsuki and Yayoi have a crush on Natsumi, and on episode 8 when Sgt. Major Kururu turned Aki into a teenager. Satsuki and Yayoi thought Aki was hot thinking she was Fuyuki even though she had boobs.

=== Masayoshi Yoshiokadaira ===
Voiced by: Hiro Shimono (Japanese); Mike McFarland (English, Funimation dub)

Masayoshi Yoshiokadaira is one of the hundreds of faceless black ops agents in the Nishizawa Peach Group. Only two things distinguish Masayoshi Yoshiokadaira from them: his awkwardly long name, and his tendency to be thrust into prominent roles during Momoka's get-close-to-Fuyuki plans, such as 'eloping' with her in episode 98. It's not until episode 248 that Yoshiokadaira gets a storyline in his name.

=== Nontolma ===
In Keroro's childhood memories, the Nontolmas (ノントルマ, Nontoruma) are what Keroro's grandfather used to refer to earthlings. They were actually a race of beings that live at the bottom of the ocean, building an undersea empire long before humans evolved. The Keroro Platoon met them when they were in the ocean. They consist of multiple Anomalocaris, an ancient white shark (possibly megalodon) with red eyes within its mouth and a mermaid who Fuyuki befriended.

=== Narrator ===
Voiced by: Keiji Fujiwara (2004–2014), Shinobu Hasegawa (2026 film), Satomi Arai (2026–present) (Japanese); R. Bruce Elliott (English, Funimation dub)

Despite his voice being heard in every episode, it is not until episode 40 that the Narrator appears as an on-screen character (although the recurring breaking of the fourth wall means that the regular characters already recognise him as such.) He is dressed as a Kuroko or kabuki stagehand, wearing a ninja-esque outfit with a black veil instead of a mask (made famous most notably by the referee in the video game Samurai Shodown) but with an additional capital N emblazoned on the veil. His appearances on the show may be few and far between, but he gains a lot more exposure upon appearing in the 8th title sequence.

=== Zeroyasha ===
Voiced by: Naoki Makishima (Japanese), Kumiko Watanabe (Japanese, young); Zach Bolton (English, Funimation dub)

Zeroyasha was shown in episode 98 and 68 in Koyuki Azumaya's memories. He is a ninja hound and a rival/friend of Dororo. In the anime, he was the one who found Dororo (Zeroro) trapped in the woods. It is seen that he is incredibly smart and athletic, being able to outwit the Keroro Platoon (Minus Dororo and Kururu) and play catch with Dororo for a week straight. It is not stated, though, that he is either Mukuro's, Koyuki's, or lives by himself since he is considered on the same level as them. But it mostly leans to being Koyuki's.

=== Angol Asami ===
Voiced by: Mamiko Noto (Japanese); Laura Bailey (English, Funimation dub)

Angol Asami (麻美) is a doppelgänger of Mois/cousin of the dreams, martial arts champion. She was turned into a "bad" girl when she got in a fight to protect her friends. Asami was committing crimes and Tamama was quick to say that it was Mois. So Mois could confront Asami, Kururu made a projection device that made every one look like Asami. Angol Mois based her human form on Asami. Mois was told by her father to find the most powerful Pekoponian and make herself look like that Pekoponian. Mois did, and so now she can transform and look like Asami.

=== Kiko Katoyama ===
Voiced by: Chisa Yokoyama (Japanese)

Kiko Katoyama (カト矢マキ子 Katoyama Kiko) was a Pekoponian working as a character designer and mechanic for the Keron Army. She was the Lowest Sergeant in the Keroro Platoon. Now is working at a company (The same that makes Gundam, and Captain Geroro figures) in Pekopon. She is friends with a Keronian, Nobibi. Kiko and Nobibi appear in the Kero Zero arch. First seen in Episode 268, when the Keroro Platoon were on the ship to Pekopon. She was later seen in Episode 305, when Nobibi noted her disappearance.

== The Angol ==
The Angols are a group of humanoid alien race whose main purpose is to destroy a planet as their tradition to their race.

=== Angol Mois ===
Voiced by: Mamiko Noto (2004–2026), Kana Ichinose (2026–present) (Japanese); Carrie Savage (English, Funimation dub)

"July 1999. The Queen of Terror descends from the sky and Angolmois awakens."

Angol Mois is the "Queen of Terror", who is ditzy and insecure as a result of her impact from space. She was sent to planet Earth to arrive in July 1999 for Earth's destruction, as predicted by Nostradamus, under orders from her father. She states that during her first appearance she told Nostradamus to deliver a message to the humans warning them of her arrival. In the anime broadcast she arrives 500 years too early and takes a nap in orbit, waking up several years too late (as the anime was originally broadcast after 1999). In the manga, she lands near Fuyuki, while in the anime, she lands on Giroro's tent (and on top of Giroro, who was inside). In both, she is taken into the Hinatas' home, where she is nursed back to health by Natsumi. When she wakes up, she reveals her true form and starts to destroy the Earth, until Keroro, who arrives later, is persuaded by Fuyuki (who reminds him that if Mois destroys Earth, there would be no more Gundam models) to stop Mois.

Although the Lord of Terror, she is anything but terrifying. She's sweet, clumsy, and peppy, with no malice whatsoever but can be scary when she gets her Lucifer Spear out. The Lucifer Spear, which she only can use while in her true form, is a terrible weapon that could, at its fullest power, completely destroy Earth. She usually uses only an infinitesimal part of its power to destroy things; her most commonly used technique, "Destruction: One Millionth", is likened to a localized meteor impact. The Lucifer Spear doubles as a cell phone, which Mois keeps in her pocket. The weakness of the Angol is a mineral called Angolnite, that neutralizes her powers. She keeps a crystal of Angolnite hidden in her room just in case.

She is close friends with Keroro, since the sergeant used to play with her when she was a child. She calls Keroro oji-sama (roughly, "uncle"). She is in love with him and dreams of being his girlfriend, though Keroro seems oblivious. Tamama considers her his rival and often competes with her for Keroro's attention (and affection), though most of the time Mois don't ever realizes she's competing. Often, her pure heart puts Tamama to shame without even realizing it – an unconscious weapon that works against the cynical Kururu. Her main goal is to make Keroro happy, something Keroro takes sometimes advantage of to make her do his cleaning work in his place. She also works as part of the platoon as communication's officer and overall helper. She lives in a room at the platoon's underground base.

In her true Angol form, she is a pale gray-haired, brown-eyed girl who wears a purple, yellow and white costume. However, to blend in with the Earth people, Mois transforms into a tanned, bleached-blonde teenager (kogal) who is always seen in a school uniform and loose socks. She got her Earth look from when she first arrived, not long before she met the Hinatas. In the manga, her father had encouraged her to see only herself as important as this frame of mind was needed to become an effective planet destroyer. Thus, she chose the form of a Japanese school girl she saw ending a friendship with another girl for her own benefit. In the anime, she chose the form of a girl who was fighting for her friends, thus becoming her "inspiration."

Her transformation sequences, stylized costume, and related accessories may make her a parody of the "magical girl" genre. As an added note, Mois's Pekopon-form wears a hairclip explicitly in the shape of the Science Patrol's meteor-mark in the anime (while Asami, the girl whose form/soul she "borrowed", has an Ultra Garrison-mark hairclip). Her name is frequently used in puns on the Japanese phrase moe-moe, which usually refers to a cute girl who appeals to older members of the audience.

In the English manga, her name is "Angol Moa". In the English anime, her lucifer spear is called "Hellmageddon", an amalgamation of the words "hell" and "armageddon" meaning doomsday.

=== King of Terror ===
Voiced by: Nobuaki Kakuda (Japanese, first voice), Fumihiko Tachiki (Japanese, second voice); Cole Brown (English, Funimation dub)

The father of Mois. Like his daughter, he is very kind hearted until he is called to destroy Earth.

=== Angol Tia ===
Although she is not an heir of King of Terror, she got the power to punish planets. At the end of Manga Volume 13, it was revealed that Mois's mother was the main reason why dinosaurs became extinct on Earth. In Volume 14 her name was revealed as Tia.

=== Angol Fear ===
Voiced by: Takako Honda (Japanese)

In the game Soulcalibur IV a character named Angol Fear appears, designed by the same creator of Sgt. Frog and is revealed to be Angol Mois's cousin. Fear plays a similar role to Mois as a judge over the earth and executor of its people. Fear uses a black version of Mois' Lucifer Spear and appears in Chapter 148 of the manga to confront Mois over her constant failure to destroy Earth.

== Other Aliens ==
=== Space Deputy Kogoro ===
Voiced by: Nobuyuki Hiyama (Japanese); John Swasey (English, Funimation dub)

Kogoro is the childhood friend of Keroro and a self proclaimed space deputy. He loves colored boxes (and collects them). His height is 177 cm and his weight is 77 kg. Kogoro seems to be always energetic, the same vitriol-laden smile affixed on his face while he laughs and stares into space (even when he has been knocked unconscious – he does stop laughing though), although only his younger sister Lavie can read his true feelings.

He arrives on Earth with his sister after learning that Keroro is also on the planet and seeks him out for a "battle", going after Natsumi due to her affiliation with the Keronians. Although the Hinata's and the rest of the Platoon initially believe they are actually fighting, it is soon revealed that they are just play fighting and that they used to do it all the time as kids.

After this incident, Kogoro and Lavie decide to remain on Earth and make a living, though Kogoro has trouble landing a paying job due to his lack of experience and strange personality. He ends up spending most of his days at home or helping out the platoon in their schemes.

He is likely a parody of the character Gavan from the Metal Hero Series Space Sheriff Gavan. It only takes him a split-second (0.003 nanoseconds in the anime) to transform with his suit. (This also is a parody of the length of time it takes Gavan to transform, although Kogoro's transformation merely requires him putting on a helmet.)

=== Lavie ===
Voiced by: Tomoko Kaneda (Japanese); Leah Clark (English, Funimation dub)

Kogoro's sweet natured younger sister who wears rabbit ears. She arrives on Earth with Kogoro and assists him in tracking down Keroro by chasing Natsumi. After their pretend battle, both decide to remain on Earth. Because Kogoro never gets any work, she supports them financially by working part-time jobs, and eventually becoming a television star along with her brother.

There is a character from the anime Mado King Granzort with the same name and is a long ears race person (presuming that she's kind of a reference to him) who is a primary character in the Granzort Series.

She frequently apologizes for her brother's bizarre behavior (sometimes unnecessarily) has become a recurring habit of hers. She is also the only one who can accurately read her brothers emotions and can always tells when he is actually upset or angry despite always looking and acting positively. Much like her brother Kogoro, Lavie is a parody of the character Annie, a partner of the eponymous character in Space Sheriff Shaider.

In the English manga, her name is "Rabbie."

=== Sumomo ===
Voiced by: Juri Ihata (Japanese); Caitlin Glass (English, Funimation dub)

Sumomo is a member of the Axolotl, a race based on newts in the same way the Keronians are based on frogs. In the manga, a girl finds Sumomo. Sumomo immediately falls in love with Fuyuki Hinata and tries to "kiss" him by wrapping her tongue around him, because she does not know Earth's customs. The girl's father finds Sumomo, and like Keroro, was converted into a comic book character.

In the anime, Sumomo is an immensely popular pop singer known throughout most of the galaxy. She first appears after she crash lands on Earth and is found sleeping on top of Fuyuki in his bed. Though initially claiming that she is there to sing for Keroro and his men, she eventually admits that she came to Earth to briefly get away from her fame, though she eventually leaves after realizing she loves being a known celebrity.

Sumomo returns to Earth occasionally to seeks the frogs help in her celebrity activities. As Keroro is one of her biggest fans, he frequently puts his men to work doing whatever she needs or asks, such as setting up a concert or building a replica body of Natsumi for a reality prank show.

Sumomo has the ability to change her form into a hot chick of four hundred alien species including human. Like the comic book, she does not know Earth's customs, but Natsumi and Fuyuki help her. Sumomo's song at the end of the episode is "Shoot Stars in the Face."

=== Alisa Southerncross ===
Voiced by: Akiko Yajima (Japanese)

Alisa is an undead being/toy doll who feasts on cryptid and alien to gain life energy. Her adoptive father Nebula was the alien which tried to give the life energy by absorbing it for what they call "dark race"; the "prey" that they captured would usually being locked in a box. The first time when this character was seen in episode 133, which she captured the Keroro Platoon and "kidnapped" Fuyuki, but befriends Keroro and the others later. Her second appearance was in episode 141, and she appeared in episode 149. She was being shown on the Keroro Movie 5, Keroro Unlimited Transformation, Miracle of the Island of Time.

=== Nyororo ===
Voiced by: Keiji Fujiwara (Japanese); Christopher Bevins (English, Funimation dub)

A yellow space plant that loves humidity. It loves to absorb the humidity of any super wet objects (or aliens). Nyororos are the only species capable of neutralizing Keroro when he is overly exposed to moisture and becomes to powerful to control or stop. When Keroro is exposed to too much moisture, the Nyororos become drawn to Keroro and are usually able to find and suck the moisture out of him. They are even able to track him from very far distances extending into space.

However, some aliens use Nyororo as a reducing-weight tool (Putata of the Shurara Corps and Kururu are known to rear their own Nyororo for their own purposes).

=== Nyororo Ω ===
A brown monster with many tentacles. The Garuru Platoon used them as weapons in the invasion of Earth. This kind of Nyororo doesn't seem to have the ability to absorb humidity.

=== Space Pizza FX ===
It reproduces by releasing crumbs that grow into mini-creatures about 1 foot wide (juvenile form) overnight.

=== Lifeopus ===
A yellow octopus that has a big eye and big lips. It is used in the show to save Momoka from drowning. Momoka believes that the lifeopus deposited an egg or eggs inside of her, and the Narrator confirms this.

It appears in the next episode as being caught off the coastline by fishermen.

=== Space Cerberus ===
A giant monster with 3 heads and the ability to recover itself. Its liver is said to be able to heal anyone from any diseases. Giroro once fought one to get its liver so he can save Natsumi.

=== Viper ===
Voiced by: Nobuo Tobita (Japanese); Charles Campbell, Jerry Jewell, Chris Patton, Austin Tindle, Eric Vale (English, Funimation dub)

Viper is the name claimed by all members of the immediate and extended Viper family and friends. Each Viper character, upon entering the scene, will explain his or her relationship to the previous Viper. The first Viper fought the Keroro Platoon per the age old "snake versus frog" battle and thought it was his right to abuse the weaker Keronian. After all, snakes often ate frogs as part of their diet. However, with his defeat, each subsequent Viper has been on a vendetta against the Keroro Platoon. The exception is Viper Mother, who on Mother's Day, was only traveling to earth to visit her son, Viper.

Each member of the Viper Family is outfitted with a red jumpsuit, black belt, and right hand blaster. Variations of Viper and the Viper family can be seen in the Viper Wedding, Episode 74 "Surprising – Keroro Special Version, gero gero 30 minutes, 15 stories".

Their appearances (red jumpsuit, hand blaster, and cigarette) is a parody of Cobra.

==== Viper (original) ====
The first Viper who fights the Keroro Platoon because of a war between the Keronians and the Vipers, and was defeated by a technique used by Dororo. He reappears in Episode 121, where he appears as a cyborg who takes revenge on Dororo, but ends up capturing Chiroro and hides in Alien Street from the Space Police and the Keroro Platoon. To keep himself from being spotted, he disguises himself as a chef in a ramen stand. When Keroro disguises himself as Viper and captures Karara in an effort to earn money, Viper takes off his disguise and attempts to defeat the fake Viper, proving that he does have some good in him. Viper's cyborg appearance is very reminiscent of Freeza, of Dragon Ball Z fame, when he became Mecha Freeza. His left half has been completely demolished and replaced with mechanical parts, his left eye is green and has a yellow scope as its pupil, a black tube appears on his head and leads to the back of his head, and the buster arm he had before has now been replaced with a mechanical claw. He has a son that was taken away by his ex-wife who he taught a technique on how to make the Tokyo Tower out of cherry stems.

==== Cool Big Brother Viper ====
The older brother of Viper. He kidnapped the Keroro Platoon and was defeated by Dororo. He soon enlarged himself but he was scared off by a larger Keroro due to the Flash Spoon.

==== Viper (relative) ====
One of the relatives of the defeated Viper. He formed a group of Vipers and stole a ring which is the clue of treasure. He was later captured by Jessica.

==== Viper (Former Pirate) ====
A kind Viper that Keroro, Giroro and Zeroro met when they were young. He gave clues of the hidden treasure in a deserted planet to Keroro.

=== 3M and R Gray ===
3M voiced by: Bin Shimada (Japanese); Christopher Ayres (English, Funimation dub)

R Gray voiced by: Hikaru Midorikawa (Japanese); Greg Ayres (English, Funimation dub)

Known as the Sentimental Consultants, they are the MCs of a popular show. 3M is the tall one with a head shaped like a chestnut; R Gray is the short one, looking just like the stereotypical Roswell alien (hence the 'Gray'). They once visited the Earth, but they were soon attacked by Giroro, who mistook them as the impostors.

=== Wettle King ===
Voiced by: Daiki Nakamura (Japanese)

Created by Keroro upon learning that Natsumi was afraid of slugs, Wettle King (ウェットルキング, Wettoru Kingu) is a common slug evolved by Kururu into a humanoid being who resembles a green Ultraman with tiny eyes and feelers on his head. Though he has 1000 times the strength of a normal slug, he was still quite weak, but his attacks worked against Natsumi because she was so much revolted by his viscosity. Fuyuki, however, was able to defeat him with a finger. Unless he's in an ambiance with very high humidity, he can only fight for 4 minutes and 44 seconds before he has to recharge himself with water. Despite Keroro's intentions, Wettle King's spirit of righteousness forbade him from harming Natsumi, and he flew off into deep space in the end to find someplace where he could be useful, until his powers were needed once again.

In episode 215, Wettle King returns with the additional ability to disguise himself as Tohru Uetsu, a motorcycle-riding, smooth-talking (and incredibly clumsy) photojournalist, along with playing a trumpet during his entrance scene, he is reminiscent of Hayato Icimonji, the second Kamen Rider and his costume was a parody to Ichiro of Kikaider 01.

The design of Wettle King is a parody of the classic tokusatsu series Iron King. While in the manga, his appearance is a parody of Ultraman, which he is referred as "Wettlemaman".

=== Wettle King Clones ===
In episode 215, Keroro creates a new batch of seven Wettol Kings, easily differentiated from the original by their recolored gloves and boots, along with matching scarves, a deliberate parody of the Shocker Riders from Kamen Rider. Sent to attack Natsumi, the clones wind up facing off with the original Wettle King, who awakens their righteous spirits and turns them into his allies. Together, the eight Wettle Kings are a deliberate send-up of the recent Ultraman movie, '8 Ultra Brothers'.

=== Jessica Harpie ===
Voiced by: Emi Shinohara (Japanese); Lydia Mackay (English, Funimation dub)

A Space Policewoman. As an officer of the galactic version of Interpol, she is highly skilled and outfitted with advanced weapons and equipment. With the help of Keroro Platoon, she was able to capture the wanted Viper.

=== Poyon ===
Voiced by: Asuka Tanii (Japanese); Maxey Whitehead (English, Funimation dub)

One of the Space Policewomen, she always shows up just before the Keroro Platoon can successfully conquered Earth every time. Poyon frequently busts Keroro and his men for crimes they both intentionally and unintentionally commit and often fines them, sometimes resulting in the platoon going broke. She can travel anywhere instantaneously through the use of space portals. When she's coming out of the portal, she gets out very slow usually singing "Heave ho, Poyon Go". She ends most of her sentences with "poyo." It's revealed that Poyan is her subordinate.

=== Poyan ===
Voiced by: Asuka Tanii (Japanese)

One of the Space Policewomen. She is currently stationed at the Aliens Street to prevent any human realizing the existence of aliens.

=== Sylbie ===
A scout from the moonlight special squad, an ally of Keron. She tested Koyuki and asked her if she would join the moonlight squad. She decided otherwise when she found out that Koyuki had a best friend on Earth.

=== Bananawani ===
A giant crocodilian like animal that can feed itself by eating bananas from the banana trees on its back. It is one of the biggest fears of Keroro, as he can't resist stepping on the peel after a bananawani has eaten a banana. Wani translates to crocodile.

=== Dance Man ===
Voiced by: Hideki "Dance Man" Fujisawa (Japanese); Christopher Sabat (English, Funimation, dub)

=== Dance Master ===
Voiced by: Chō (Japanese); Eric Vale (English, Funimation dub)

Dance Master (ダソヌ☆マソ, Dasonu Maso) is an impostor of Dance Man who claims that the dance man is an imposter of him, he is a popular singer who wears an afro, too. While his fame is derived entirely from the fact that the katakana for his name is easily confused with Dance Man's, and his act consists entirely of telling the truths about himself and his lifestyle (and not much actual singing), he is still considered a bona fide intergalactic idol by Keroro and company. The afro of Dance Master can absorb and reflect any attacks. Whenever the concert ticket of Dance Master is torn, Dansou Maso is summoned. He can fire laser beam from his glasses to give an afro hairstyle to whomever it hits. The only way to damage him is to use scissors to cut his afro or sing better than he can.

=== Dasonu Mari ===
Dasonu Mari (ダソヌ☆マリ) is the younger sister of Dasonu Maso. She learnt that Keroro Platoon is a team full of comedians from Dasonu Maso so she went to observe Keroro Platoon. Keroro, who was trying to prove her wrong, started invasion immediately, but they all failed in comedic ways.

At the end of episode 114, Dasonu Maso turns her long blond hair into a black heart-shaped afro, which she keeps for all her future appearances.

=== Cheuton ===
From episode 132. Cheuton is one of five identical trainee assassins, from an alien race based on bees just as Keronians are based on frogs. They take orders from a wall-mounted falcon symbol with a blinking red light – this, combined with their appearance, references the evil organisation Shocker and the Shocker Riders from Kamen Rider.

=== Prisoner #303 ===
An evil alien that likes to possess the others body and eat as much as he can. According to the Space Law, the possessed one is responsible for paying the economical loss caused by 303.

=== Events Alien ===
With a head shaped like a lava lamp and a two-colored skin tone split down the middle, these members of the Events Alien race are commonly seen in charge of galactic television stations.

=== Space Kumiko Watanabe ===
Voiced by: Kumiko Watanabe (Japanese), Colleen Clinkenbeard (English)

The catgirl-looking voice actress of Space Captain Geroro (galactic dub), named after the real life voice actress for Keroro Gunso. She was often seen in scenes with a lot of aliens.

=== Super Dali ===
A kind of tiny humanoid invader. Super Dali love to invade unhealthy teeth and build a headquarters on them. Keroro's molar was once invaded by Super Dali. In episode 10 the Super Dali are led by a Dali Queen, 100 times taller than her minions, and resembling the Succubus from Warcraft 3.

In Episode 218, Dasonu*Maso mutates a colony of Super Dali into the afro-coifed Super Daso, making them powerful enough to not only beat the Keroro Platoon, but take them prisoner.

=== ZZZ (Lt. Zezeze Tototoso) ===
A gigantic invader which is 2000 m tall. Any planets targeted by him have no chances to survive from his mad collecting habit. As he was moving to Earth, all aliens except Keroro Platoon left the Earth. Keroro Platoon attempted to fight him but got beaten and were forced to return to the Earth. At the same time, Angol Moa found an ancient weapon in Aliens Street. Keroro Platoon, with their human partners and some aliens led by the Space Police used it to fight ZZZ but failed to damage him even with the attack from Garuru's Platoon. Angol Moa dropped a space banana peel and Keroro went to step on it and the peel flew to ZZZ's feet. ZZZ slipped and was defeated when he flew to the Sun caused by the slip.

== Movies ==
=== Keroro Gunso the Super Movie ===
==== Mirara ====
Voiced by: Yuri Aragaki (Japanese)

Mirara is a Keronian who sealed Kiruru. She was released, along with Kiruru, when Keroro and Fuyuki breaks the orange crystal where they were sealed in. She is a pink Keronian tadpole with a brace and bell holding two locks of her hair and wears a pink robe with a red O symbol. She uses a giant mecha similar to the three in Episode 28 to travel and she can control O marks just as Kiruru can control X marks. After replacing Keroro and Fuyuki's X marks with O marks, she turns into a key. She and Kiruru were sealed away when Keroro and Fuyuki pressed her into a slot in a giant orange crystal in the heart of Kiruru's pillar. The capturer of Kiruru. She can absorb positive energy and turns into a key that can seal Kiruru away.

==== Kiruru ====
Voiced by: Ogi Yahagi (Japanese)

The main villain of the first movie who was sealed away with Mirara in tower form. Kiruru is a Keronian war machine that went on an uncontrollable rampage millions of years ago but was sealed away in an orange crystal by Mirara. He feeds on negative energy. His design is a white Keronian that wears golden bracelets and has a Keronian soldier helmet-like head with a black bottom jaw and belly. He has a red X on his forehead, much like the placement of Keronian emblems on their hats. He attacks by flying through the air and giving people an X mark on their body. This allows them to telepathically communicate and give more Xs, but Kiruru powers himself using their negative emotions and the victims eventually only think about negative thoughts. Then, once he obtains enough power, he transforms into a more powerful form, which looks like a large beast. In this form he has no legs, instead he has a long, thick tail and moves around with his two hands. This form and the next are impervious to damage and generate a strong paperlike substance from its limbs to cover up large expanses of land. After collecting even more negative energy, Kiruru transforms into a tower and begins cloning his first form. The clones fly in an X formation until they attack, when they swarm around their unfortunate victim. He was defeated when the Hinata's and the Keroro Platoon's friendship removed their Xs and Fuyuki and Keroro placed Mirara into the orange crystal, sealing away Kiruru once again.

=== Keroro Gunso the Super Movie 2: The Deep Sea Princess ===
Left behind in their undersea home by an ancient Maron alien army after an unsuccessful invasion, Meru and Maru appear to be sea lizard-based in the same way the Keronians are based on frogs. They appear again in vol. 20 of the manga, which features another known Maronian, Miroro.

==== Meru ====
Voiced by: Houko Kuwashima (Japanese)

Meru is prince of the Deep Sea, and the main antagonist of the movie. He is destined to marry Natsumi Hinata, whom he claims to be his princess. Growing up with no memories of his childhood, family, home, nor race, he and Maru (マール, Maaru) as his servant develops a second childhood, filled with loneliness. One night, Meru and Natsumi the kingdom's sacred weapon to uphold their titles with the Mer Ball, a weapon that resembles the Kero Ball. Kururu then reveals that Meru and Maru came from Maron, a planet of water, and Meru would eventually flood Pekopon to become his world. They were saved by the Keroro Platoon together with Fuyuki and Momoka. With the corrupted Mer Ball forever out of the wrong hands, Meru and Maru ultimately fall in love and wish their friends farewell as they start a new life on Maron as prince and princess.

==== Maru ====
Voiced by: Nozomi Tsuji (Japanese)

Maru is a "childhood friend" and assistant of Meru. They have been together for as long as they can remember. Despite she's playful and sometimes clumsy, she is kind, proud, and strict just like Meru but only sometimes. She is a very skilled fighter, who defeated Giroro quickly by using a Mer ball (scythe form).

==== Nightmares ====
Groups of giant creatures that were created from the Mer Ball by Meru. They were used to capture Natsumi and to guard the palace. When the platoon went to get Natsumi back, they were held back by the Nightmares, but they managed to defeat them.

=== Chibi Kero: Secret of the Kero Ball ===
==== Shupepe ====
A young male Keronian who is with Kururu when he finds the Kero Ball outside of Chibi Kero's hideout. He is a grayish purple in color, wears a periwinkle hat, and has a bandage over his nose. Shupepe wears blue-rimmed headphones similar to those that Kururu wears as an adult. His symbol is a bandage that is blue on his belly and white on his hat. He is voiced by an uncredited child fan.

==== Rinono ====
A young female Keronian who is with Kururu when he finds the Kero Ball. She is pale orange in color, wears a pink hat with a red bow on the right side. Her symbol is a bow that is orange on her belly and light pink on her hat. She and Shupepe leave Kururu behind when he becomes more interested in the Kero Ball. She is voiced by an uncredited child fan.

=== Keroro Gunso the Super Movie 3 ===
==== Miruru ====
Voiced by: Yui Horie (Japanese)

Appears in the third movie. She was released (accidentally, by Keroro) from imprisonment in a crystal chamber deep in the ruins of Macchupicchu in Peru. Dark Keroro recruits her into his fledgling platoon, where she turns system operator of his massive battlecruiser. Sharing Pururu and Sumomo's ability to disguise herself as a human, she assumes the name Nazca and lures Fuyuki into a trap. At the end of the movie, Miruru is revealed to have the same role as Mirara in the first movie, intended this time for sealing Dark Keroro.

==== Dark Keroro ====
Voiced by: Kumiko Watanabe (Japanese)

The main villain of the third movie. Looking almost exactly like Keroro, he is in fact a newly uncovered Kiruru in the mountaintop city of MacchuPicchu in Peru, grown from a sample of Keroro's DNA taken off the Kero Ball (during the same occasion where Miruru awakened). He leads the other Keronian manifestations, Shivava and Doruru.

At the end of the film, Miruru sacrifices herself to seal the Kiruru half of Dark Keroro, putting an end to his malevolent intentions. Rid of his violent ambitions, Dark Keroro makes up with his counterpart and heads off into space to try to conquer a different planet. However, his plans are thwarted by alien look-alikes of Fuyuki and Natsumi in an intentional parody of the start of the series.

==== Shivava ====
Voiced by: Minami Takayama (Japanese)

Shivava is a stuck up Keronian who thinks of himself as the "main character." He left Keron because it was "too small" for him and joined forces with Dark Keroro and Doruru. He is rivaled with Tamama, who cannot stand him, but ultimately loses to him and Momoka when they gang up on him.

==== Doruru ====
Voiced by: Ru Ohsiba (Japanese)

Doruru is a member of Dark Keroro's Keronian manifestation empire, alongside Dark Keroro and Shivava. Giroro remembers him as one of his old brigade's fiercest soldiers. In the end, Doruru is defeated with Giroro and Natsumi's combined efforts.

=== Keroro Gunso the Super Movie 4 ===
==== Shion ====
Voiced by: Nana Mizuki (Japanese)

Félicia Shion du Dracoon, called Shion by Momoka and her friends, initially felt alone for much of her life. Through an heirloom she inherited when her parents died, Shion learned of the Earth Dragon prophecy. She sets the events of the movie in motion by turning Tamama, Giroro, Kururu, and Dororo into dragons as part of a warrior program. Eventually learning a secret in the spellbook she used, and learning that she is not alone, she helped to stop the Earth Dragon.

==== Terara ====
Voiced by: Ikue Otani (Japanese)

The Earth Dragon who awakens once every 5000 years to recreate the world, it was eventually held back by the Keroro Platoon, who were then turned to dragons by Shion and made to its servants. Sion eventually reasoned with it, giving it the name Terara. Terara transferred all of it energy back to Earth. A piece of the Earth Dragon is eventually born at the end of the movie, it is Terara in a Keronian tadpole form.

=== Keroro Gunso the Super Movie 5 ===
==== Io ====
Io is one of the main characters in Keroro Gunso the Super Movie 5. He is Rana's brother and a Mana in human form.

==== Rana ====
Rana is of the main characters in Keroro Gunso the Super Movie 5. She is Io's sister and a Mana in human form.

==== Mana ====
Mana are magical spirits that lived for many years and also debuted in the fifth movie. Their appearances are small, glowing, roundish like orb creatures that come in many colors with blue pupils. Even though they have no mouth, they are usually heard saying mana. Io and Rana are mana only in human form. Manas had the power to seal Akuaku.

==== Akuaku ====
Akuaku is the main villain of the fifth movie and an evil spirit that loves to play pranks. When a diver managed to take away a moai statue that was keeping him inside, he escaped. He managed to defeat Alisa and her father easily. After a tough battle with Keroro and his platoon, he manages to steal Kururu's knowledge, Tamama's power, Dororo's skills and Giroro's determination by swallowing them, absorbing their energy and then spitting them out. He doesn't attack when it is raining because he is afraid of water. When Keroro is transformed into a Makemake creature, he is surprisingly beaten up by Keroro but comes back to take him down. As he is about to defeat Keroro, he is grabbed by him and purified by the spirits of the moai statues. However, he returns in a smaller blob form but he is soon eaten by Alisa's father.
